= Porsche type numbers =

Numeric codes used by Porsche

Ferdinand Porsche founded his company Dr. Ing. h.c. F. Porsche GmbH, Konstruktionen und Beratungen für Motoren und Fahrzeugbau (Porsche) in April 1931 in Stuttgart. The company established a numeric record of projects known as the Type List. Initially, the list was maintained by Karl Rabe. The first number was Type 7, chosen so that Wanderer-Werke AG did not realize they were the company's first customer.

The first entries in the list are designs by Ferdinand Porsche before the company was founded and therefore these do not have a Type number. The designs up to number 287 are from the period leading into World War II when the company was based in Stuttgart. Type number 288 is the first of the Gmünd period where the company was relocated as part of the program to disperse companies outside big cities to prevent damage from the Allied strategic bombing campaign. In 1950 the company moved back to Stuttgart and makes a new start with Type 500, skipping a large part of the 400 range. Most numbers in this range are used up to the point where the initial designation for the 911 was chosen: number 901, skipping a large part of the 800 range. At this stage the practice of allocating a separate number to each component design (e.g. chassis, gearbox or engine) was abandoned and the 3-digit numbers are used for entire projects. At the start of the 900 range, the external customer projects receive a 4-digit number. More recently many new models have received alpha-numeric codes to fit with the VW-Group nomenclature.

Porsche Type Numbers
Type Number	Year	Description
P1	1898	Egger–Lohner C.2 Phaeton Electric car
	1901–1906	Lohner–Porsche Mixte Hybrid
	1910	Austro-Daimler Modell 27/80 "Prince Henry"
	1910	Austro-Daimler Electrique Fire Tender for the London Fire Brigade
	1911	Austro-Daimler Alpenwagen
	1922	Austro-Daimler Sascha
	1927–1932	Mercedes Benz S, SS & SSK
	1928	Daimler Benz Grosstraktor I
7	1930–1931	Chassis with 1.7 and 1.87 liter 6 cylinder engine for the Wanderer W22 (first Porsche office design)
8	1930–1931	Chassis with 3.25-liter 8-cylinder engine for a Wanderer coupé
9	1930–1931	Prototype for Wanderer, supercharged Type 8 with a Streamline body by Reutter. Used by Ferdinand Porsche as a personal car for 4 or 5 years.
10	1931	Independent rear suspension for the Horch 830B
12	1931–1932	Zündapp 3 and 5 cylinder radial engine for rear-engined saloon (not produced)
14	1931	Wanderer overdrive transmission for Type 7
15	1932	Truck design work for Phänomen werke
16	1932	Chassis and 3.3L 8 Cylinder engine for the Röhr Type F, based on Type 8
17	1932	Torsion bar suspension for Type 7
18	1932	2.5-ton, two-axle truck with 3.5L radial air cooled engine for Phänomen werke
19	1932	Air cooled 3.5-liter, three-axle, 3.5-ton truck for Phänomen werke
20	1932	Steering (arrangements) Type Stuttgart, models A (2,000 kg), B (up to 3,500 kg), C, D
21	1932–1933	Front swing axle Alfred Teves, Wanderer-Werke AG, Chemnitz
22	1932–1937	Auto Union Grand Prix car, 750 kg formula, 16 cylinder, 4.36-liter supercharged mid-engine
23	1933	Citroën Steering arrangement
24	1932–1933	Zündapp three wheeled vehicle
25	1933	Exhibition – axle for small car. Alfred Teves, Frankfurt
26	1933	Zündapp torsion bar suspension for 400cc small car
27	1933	Mathis-Ford Saloon car design
28	1933	Modifications of Type 18, chassis and Diesel engine
29	1933	Modifications of Type 19, chassis and Diesel engine
30	1933	Independent (swing-arm) front suspension for Hanomag
31	1933	Independent (swing-arm) front suspension for the Wanderer W22, W240 and W40
32	1933–1934	NSU Saloon, chassis with four-cylinder, flat-four, 1.45-liter air-cooled rear engine producing 28 hp and torsion bar suspension.
33	1933	Front swing axle design for Morris sedan
34	1933	Steering design for Fiat
36	1934	Chassis with 3.3L 8 cylinder supercharged engine for the Röhr Olympier Typ FK
38	1934	Modified petrol engine for two-axle lorry (type 28)
39	1934	Modified petrol engine for three-axle lorry (type 29)
40	1933–1934	Single cylinder diesel test engine for Typ 38/39
42	1934	Trilock transmission for Klein-Schanzlin & Becker
45	1933–1934	Front axle design (Swing axle for Citroen 15CV)
46	1934	Front axle design (Swing axle for the Standard Motor Company)
47	1933–1934	Front axle design (Swing axle for the Volvo PV series)
48		Exhibition model for rubber spring suspension, commissioned by Getefo Berlin
49	1934	One cylinder diesel test engine for Süddeutsche Bremsen-AG
50	1934	Front axle design (Swing axle) for Triumph sedan
51	1934	Single cylinder test engine for Type 55
52	1934	Auto Union sports car design based on Type 22
54	1935	Exhibition models for the 1935 Berliner Autoausstellung
55	1935	1000 PS airplane engine for Süddeutsche Bremsen-AG
56	1935	Front suspension for E.R.A. C-type race car
57	1935	Zündapp motorcycle engine
59	1934	Independent swing-arm front suspension for Rochet Schneider truck
60	1934–1941	KdF-Wagen, later called Volkswagen
61	1935	Narrow version of the Type 60. Also known as Type 60K5.
62	1936	Kübelwagen prototype
63	1938	Rear axle design (Swing axle) for Alfa Romeo 6C2300
64	1938	VW-Rekord (Sport), Volkswagen 1.5-liter sports car design. Parts of the design where later used for the Type 60K10 Berlin-Rome race car.
65	1939	driving-school fittings for KdF
66	1938–1939	KdF right-hand drive
67	1939	KdF "invalid vehicle"
68	1939	KdF Reichspost delivery van
69	1934	Rear axle design (Swing axle) for Alfa Romeo 8C2900
70	1935–1936	32-cylinder, 17.7-litre radial water-cooled aircraft engine for the Deutsche Versuchsanstalt für Luftfahrt (DVL)
71	1935	32 cylinder aircraft test engine (DVL)
72	1935	V16, 19.7-litre water-cooled aircraft engine (DVL)
73	1935	16 cylinder aircraft test engine (DVL)
74	1935	Connecting rod test unit for Type 70
75	1936	Front axle and steering design for Austro-Fiat (ÖAF) trucks
76	1936	Laboratory equipment (stress testing, internal use)
78	1937	Aircraft engine with slide valve gear and variable-pitch propeller
79	1937	Front and rear truck axle design for Delaunay-Belleville
80	1938–1939	Mercedes-Benz land speed record car
81	1939	Volkswagen Van chassis with panel van body (K286)
82	1939–1940	Kübelwagen based on KdF components
83	1939	Volkswagen "Kreis" transmission system
84	1939	Volkswagen "Dr.Hering" double clutch transmission system
85	1939	Volkswagen study for a four-wheel drive transmission
86	1939	Volkswagen study for a four-wheel drive Kübelwagen
87	1939–1941	Kubelwagen prototypes with four-wheel drive based on Type 82
88	1939	Volkswagen delivery van on Kübelwagen chassis
89	1939–1941	Volkswagen "Beier" automatic gearbox study
90	1938	V12 rear-engined racing car study for Daimler-Benz
92	1940	Volkswagen cross-country car (typ82 with KdF body), Volkswagen Type 82E
93	1939	Limited-slip differential design for Daimler-Benz
94	1939	Daimler-Benz 24 cyl. 4.5L. 360 PS racing engine
95	1939	Omnibus chassis and suspension for Daimler-Benz
96	1938–1939	Hydraulic power transmission for Daimler-Benz
97	1938	Daimler-Benz heavy truck (Bulldog)
98	1940	Volkswagen amphibious car with Type 62CL body, Schwimmwagen prototype
99	1938	Trailer design for Goertz
100	1939–1941	VK 30.01 (P) medium tank prototype
101	1942	VK 45.01 (P) prototype for Tiger I. Heavy tank with the 8.8 cm Kwk 36 L/56 gun and petrol-electric transmission. The produced chassis were rebuilt as Elefant tank destroyers.
102	1942	Type 101 Tiger tank with Voith electric transmission
103	1942	Type 101 Tiger tank with Voith hydraulic transmission
104	1939	One cylinder test engine for Type 94
105		Evaluation of Continental aircraft engine
106		PIM experimental power transmission for type 60 KdF
107	1938	Turbo-charged engine for type 60 KdF
108	1938	Daimler-Benz engine with two stage supercharger for Mercedes-Benz Grand Prix car
109	1938	Two stroke motorcycle engine for Daimler-Benz
110	1938–1939	Small tractor, Volkspflug
111	1939–1940	Small tractor, new design
112	1940–1941	Larger-engined small tractor
113	1941	Small tractor, version III
114	1938–1939	F-Wagen: 1.5-liter V-10 Porsche sports-car design
115	1939	Supercharged 1.1-liter KdF engine, overhead camshafts
116	1938–1939	KdF-backed 1.5-liter racing car with Type 114 components
117		Experimental one cylinder engine for Type 101
118		Clutch design for "Rohrbeck" transmission
119		Experimental one cylinder engine for Typ 10
120	1939–1940	Generator based on Volkswagen engine for the Reichsluftfahrtministerium
121	1939–1940	Stationary Volkswagen engine for the Heereswaffenamt
122	1939–1940	Stationary engine with coil ignition for the Reichspost
123		Trailer design for Hahn
124		Kübelwagen modified for use on railway track
125		Wind powered generator, 4500W
126		Fully synchronized transmission for Volkswagen
127	1940–1941	Study of sliding valves engine for Volkswagen
128	1940–1941	KdF-based amphibian Schwimmwagen, original design
129	1940–1941	Typ 128 with shortened chassis
130	1942	Redesign of VK 45.01 (P) as tank destroyer "Ferdinand" (later called "Elefant")
131		Water cooled engine for Type 102
132		Fuel tank for Volkswagen
133	1940	Naturally aspirated carburetor
135	1940–1941	Wind power generator, 130 watt
136	1940–1941	Wind power generator, 736 watt
137	1940–1941	Wind power generator, 4,550 watt
138	1940–1941	Amphibian Schwimmwagen, alternate design
139		Modified chassis (no centre frame) for Typ 138
140		Gasoline-electric car heater
141		Two-cylinder auxiliary (starter) motor for Typ 101
142	1942	Panzertransporter train for Typ 100 VK 30.01 (P) (project abandoned)
145	1942	Steyr air-cooled 3,5L V8 petrol engine
146		Steyr Lkw mit Hinterradantrieb
147		Steyr 1.5 Tonne truck
148	1941	Wood-gas generator for motor carriage
149	1941	Rear suspension design for Puch motorcycle
150		"Karette" engine design for Steyr ADMK, featuring both track and wheels
151	1941	Volkswagen "Plus" transmission system
152	1941	Volkswagen "Stieber" transmission system
153	1941	Skoda Ostradschlepper traction engine with air cooled 6 cylinder engine
155	1941	“Kettenlaufwerk” Half-track version of the Type 82 Kübelwagen
156	1941	Railway track adaptation for the Type 166 Schwimmwagen
157	1941	Railway track adaptation for the Type 82 and Type 87
158	1941	Wood-gas generator
159	1941	One cylinder diesel test engine with "Simmering" pre-combustion chamber injection
160	1941	Design for KdF with self-supporting body
162	1941	Kübelwagen with self supporting body
163	1941	Kübelwagen tank trainer
164	1941	Volkswagen cross-country lorry with 2 engines (6x4)
166	1942–1945	Schwimmwagen, final design
168		Drive train for a tank (VK 9.04)
170	1942	Marine Sturmboot engine, based on VW engine with 40PS, version I
171	1942	Marine Sturmboot engine, version II
172		Fuel tank for Volkswagenwerk, GmbH Fallersleben
173		Evaluation of Ford Pigmy Jeep
174	1942	Marine Sturmboot engine using normal KdF engine
175	1942	Steel-wheeled military tractor, Radschlepper Ost
176	1942	Auxiliary starter motor with gearing for Typ 175
177	1942	five-speed gearbox for Type 82 and Type 87, Design A
178	1942	Simplified version of five-speed transmission, Design B
179	1942	Fuel injection system for Volkswagen petrol engine
180	1942	VK 45.02 (P) tank design with petrol engine and electric transmission. Lost out to Henschel Tiger II
181	1942	Hydraulic transmission for Type 180
182	1942	Volkswagen Kübelwagen production version
187	1942	Type 182 Kübelwagen with four wheel drive
188	1942	Amphibious car
190	1942	Conversion of Type 101 to diesel engine, cancelled
191	1942	Experimental one cylinder test engine for Type 190
192	1942	Experimental one cylinder test engine for Type 203
193	1942	Experimental one cylinder test engine with (gasoline) fuel injection for Type 101
195	1942	Torsion bar suspension
197	1942	Tank starting engine mounted on Type 82 Kübelwagen
198	1942	Tank starting engine mounted on Type 82 Kübelwagen, production version
200	1942	Air-cooled 10L Diesel engine for typ 100
203	1942	18L Diesel engine
205	1942	VK 100.01 Maus, 188-ton tank prototype
209	1942	44.5-liter diesel engine for Type 205, air cooled V12 with 1080PS. Manufacturer was Daimler-Benz.
210	1942	Airconditioning system
212	1942	Air-cooled 48-liter 16-cylinder diesel tank engine for use in Type 205
213	1942	Experimental one cylinder test engine for Typ 212
215	1942	Experimental one cylinder test engine for Typ 212, cancelled
220	1942	36.8 L Supercharged V16 Diesel engine
222	1942	Experimental tractor design "ML" for KdF
224	1942	Evaluation of Rolls-Royce Merlin aircraft engine
225	1942	Brown Boverie & Cie electric transmission for KdF
226		Evaluation of Wright Cyclone aircraft engine
227	July 1943	Spare parts list for all-wheel KdF – References highly confidential letter of 7/7/43 to Porsche KG
229		Automatic shift for electrical transmission
230	1942–1943	KdF with "Imbert" wood-fired gas generator
231	1942	Acetylene powered KdF
232		Wood fired gas generator (average gas flow 50m3/hr )
233		Wood fired gas generator (average gas flow 85m3/hr )
234		Wood fired gas generator (average gas flow 130m3/hr )
235	1942–1943	Electric transmission for KdF
236	1942–1943	Grating for Type 230, the Imbert generator
237		Engine for the Göttingen air-base
238	1942–1943	Volkswagen engine for driving a cable hoist
239	1942–1943	Kübelwagen with wood-fired gas generator
240	1942–1943	Propane gas adaptation of the VW engine for the Volkswagen and the Kübelwagen
241		Starter or auxiliary motor for Typ 205
243		10HP Gas Generator for the Zentralhandelsgesellschaft Ost für landwirtschaftlichen Absatz und Bedarf (ZHO)
244		Fabrication and assembly of grating for use in Imbert generator using low BTU coal. Commissioned by the RMRKP (Reichsministerium für Rüstung und Kriegsproduktion)
245	1942	Special vehicle V (five), small 18 ton multipurpose tank
247	1943	VW-based aero engine
250	1942–1943	E-25 Jagdpanzer design, Turretless tank with hydraulic transmission and 75mm Pak 42 L/70
252	1943	Volkswagen "P.I.V." transmission system
255	1943	Type 250 mechanical drive
258	1943	Experimental torsion bar suspension for Jagdtiger
260		Cooling system for Type 250
261	1943	Interior heater for Panther ausf G tank
262		Exhaust cooling system for Maybach HL120 tank engine
263		Cooling system for the PzKpfw 38(t)
267		Maybach HL-230 engine improvements
270		Development and fabrication of two single-horse-drawn carts
272		15 KVA emergency generator
274		Recoil starter
276	1943	Light artillery tractor based on Type 82 with "Protzhaken"
277		Transmission for Italian OM truck
278		Synchronized transmission for VW
280		Project “M” for VW
281		Belt drive propeller for Meindl, Klagefurt
282		Type 82 modified with wood gas generator
283	1943	Modified wood gas generator for Type 82 Kübelwagen
285	1944–1945	Water turbine, 3.5 hp, experimental version
286	1944	Small water turbine
287	1944	KdF Kommandeurwagen with Type 82 four wheel drive chassis and kdF body, later used for the French Army
288	1944–1945	13 PS water turbine
289	1944–1945	15 PS Water turbine
290		Project "S"
291	1945	Water turbine, 600 mm. cross section
292	1946	Water turbine, 300 mm. cross section
293	1944	Tracked Personnel carrier
294	1944	Santner Ski bindings
295		Metal work for barrack.
296		Volkswagen transfer gearbox
298	1944	Rocket Propulsion for Paul Schmidt (Argus-Schmidt-Rohr)
300	1944	TL Jet engine to power the FZG-76B long-range missile
301		500mm diameter axial-flow turbine.
302		Receipt of spare parts.
303		Receipt of spare parts.
305		1000 PS hydraulic transmission for tanks
307	1945	Volkswagen "Riedlinger" dense medium (gas, oil) carburettor
309	1945	Two-stroke diesel engine for VW or tractor
310		Small wind turbine
312	1945	Gasoline engine tractor
313	1945	17 PS air-cooled Diesel engine for Type 312
315	1945	Ski-lift with VW engine for Santner Jr., Spittal/Drau
317		Small turbine for Dr. Höfer, Millstatt
320		Receipt of machine "Berta".
321		Machine "Berta", improved version.
323	1946	Agricultural tractor with 11 PS diesel engine for Cisitalia
324		Stationary engine with 8 PS
325		Stationary engine with 15 PS
326		Stationary engine with 30 PS
328	1946	Agricultural tractor with 28 PS diesel engine and all-wheel drive
330		VW with charcoal-gas generator.
331		VW with indigenous fuels generator.
332		VW with anthracite-coal generator.
335	1946	"Bergbauern Seilwinde" winch for agricultural use
336	1946	"Spillseilwinde" Capstan winch for agricultural use
337	1946	Handcart for winch Type 335.
338		Drive for Type 335 winch
339	1946	Conveyor belt system for Gschiel
340		Type 82 with charcoal mixture installation
341		Type 82 with domestic fuel installation
342		Type 82 with anthracite charcoal installation
343		Two-wheel hand cart
344		Two-wheel hand cart
345		Sicklebar mower
348		Machine for fabrication of peat moss briquettes.
350		Business plan for Porsche KG.
352	1946	Car study. Project probably initiate in July as a result of a letter from von Senger dated June 25, 1946. The study requirements were for a four-seat touring car with fuel injection, 1.5- to 2-liter displacement, 4-cylinders producing 60 to 70 hp. The target price was 7,500 Swiss francs ($1,750).
354		Car trailer for 356-001, used by von Senger
355	1947	Volkswagen delivery van based on Type 81 and 83
356/1	1947	356-001 Two-seater mid-engined open roadster, first car produced under the Porsche brand name
356/2	1947–1948	Rear-engined aluminum bodied Porsche sports car, built in Gmünd, Carinthia
356	1950–1955	Steel-bodied Porsche 356 produced in Stuttgart, now referred to as Pre-A
356A	1955–1959	Improved production Porsche, 15-inch wheels, 1,600 cc engines
356B	1959–1963	Improved production Porsche, T-5 body
356C	1963–1966	Improved production Porsche, T-6 body, disc brakes
356 SL	1951	Racing version of Type 356/2 coupe
358		BMW Motorcycle engine redesign for Abarth
359		Studies of two-valve steering for Cisitalia
360	1947–1948	Cisitalia Formula One Grand Prix car. 1.5L air cooled, supercharged flat twelve, 4x4
361	1947	Single-cylinder test engine for Type 360
362	1948	2.0-liter unsupercharged Formula Two version of Type 360
366		VW Super Sport engine design A. With twin carburetors,
367	1949	VW Super Sport engine design B. With V heads and horizontal cooling fan. Reference drawing 367.10.403 dated June 22, 1949. Based on Typ 115 engine of 1939, which used Kompressor and OHC.
368		2.5 ton Agricultural trailer
369	1949–1950	VW Super Sport engine design C. With V type valve arrangement, (1.1-liter engine for Type 356/2). Reference drawings 369.10.001, .002 and .003 dated August 1949.
370	1947–1948	Cisitalia 1.5-liter sports-touring car. (4 seats, air-cooled, rear-mounted six cylinder engine). The Porsche June 15, 1948 internal progress report identifies this design as being expanded to include a 2-liter design.
372	1947	BMW Motorcycle engine redesign for Abarth Cisitalia sports sedan, 2L air cooled V8 with 100PS and 5-speed transmission
375	1947	Cisitalia monoposta solid axle studies.
378	1948	Porsche-Schmid synchromesh, preliminary studies
380	1948	Porsche-Schmid transmission for Fiat 508c. Design included in Cisitalia contract of Feb. 3, 1947.
382		Porsche 2L sportscar
383	1948	Porsche-Schmid synchromesh system for VW gearbox, Design A
384	1948	Porsche-Schmid synchromesh system for VW gearbox, Design B
385	1947	Cisitalia water turbine
390		Engine design for Fichtel & Sachs oHG
392		Cross mounted rear engine and hydraulics
394		Front bench seat for VW
398		Tools and fixtures for internal use (Gmünd workshop)
399		Tools and fixtures for customer orders
401		Front axle design for VW Bus (VW Type 29)
402	1949	Short wheel base design for VW Type 1951, self supporting body
403		Police car modification for VW
405		Sedan with rear mounted 1.1L engine
406		Sedan with rear mounted 2.2L engine
408		Drivetrain and suspension for type 405 and 406
410		Omnibus for Graf & Stift, Vienna
425	1948	20 PS diesel tractor
427		30 PS Diesel tractor
500		Porsche 1.3-liter engine with axial blower
501		2-stroke diesel engine for Allgaier
502	1950-1951	1.5-liter engine with Hirth crankshaft (55 hp) for Type 356
503		Winkhous irrigation system
504		Suspension study for Vidal & Sohn Tempo delivery van
505		Single cylinder diesel engine for Allgaier
506	1950–1951	1.3-liter engine (44 hp) for Type 356
506/2	1954–1955	Type 506 with three-piece crankcase
507	1951	Gearbox with Porsche-Schmid synchronization for Saurer
508	1950	Four-stroke diesel engine for Volkswagen
509	1950	1.3-liter engine for Porsche 356
510		Single cylinder hydrogen engine for Allgaier
511		1.2-liter engine for Volkswagen (HA 9032)
512		Engine study for ILO
513		Volkswagen vehicle with various adaptations
514	1951	Le Mans cars for 1951 (Porsche 356SL)
515		4-speed synchronized transmission for Volkswagen
516		Experimental cylinderhead for Volkswagen
517		Allgaier AP 17-V
518		Allgaier Porsche tractor Typ 25 S (carburetor tractor)
519	1951–1952	Synchronized transmission for Type 356, “das Servo-Synchrone-Getriebe" designed by Leopold Schmid
520		Porsche Getrag transmission for Hanomag Typ St3P25
521		Porsche Getrag transmission for DKW – Auto Union Typ StD4L28
522	1951	Volkswagen design proposal with strut-type front suspension
523	1951	Studies of outboard marine engine
524	1951	Bosch Fuel injection for Type 369 1.3-liter engine
525		Dabo-Reibkugel transmission for Volkswagen and the 356
525		Stepless Dabo-Reibkugel transmission for Industrial engines
527	1951–1952	1.5-liter production engine with 60 HP for Type 356
528	1952–1953	1.5-liter sports engine with 70 HP for Type 356, 1500S or Super
528/2	1954–1955	Type 528 with four-piece crankcase
529		Truck project for Zürcher, Automobilfabrik Orion AG
530	1951–1952	Four-passenger Porsche, 2,400 mm (94.5-inch) wheelbase
531	1952	1.3-liter engine with new camshaft
532	1952	Single barrel carburetor for type 369
533	1952	Sports-racing version of 1.1-liter engine for 356SL
534		Small Volkswagen sports car
535	1952	Allgaier tractor A111 with 1-cylinder diesel engine of 12 HP
536		Allgaier tractor A122 with 2-cylinder diesel engine of 22 HP
537		Allgaier tractor A133 with 3-cylinder diesel engine of 33 HP
538		Allgaier tractor A144 with 4-cylinder diesel engine of 44 HP
539	1952	1.5-liter 4-cylinder air-cooled engine
540	1952	Porsche America Roadster
541		Special sports version of the Type 356 for the USA
542	1953	Sedan prototype with water-cooled V6 engine for Studebaker
543		1.5-liter 4-cylinder air-cooled industrial engine
544	1952	1.5-liter 4-cylinder air-cooled industrial engine
545		Study of an off-road vehicle for Oerlikon
546	1952–1953	Plain-bearing 1.5-liter 4-cylinder air-cooled engine with 55 HP, based on Type 527
546/1		46 HP version used as an industrial engine
546/2	1954–1955	Type 546 with three-piece crankcase
547	1952–1953	1.5-liter four-camshaft racing Fuhrmann engine, experimental version for the Type 550 Spyder
547/1	1955	Type 547 series production, 100 to 110 HP
547/2		Version for Type 718 and 718/2, 135 HP
547/3	1958	Improved 1.5-liter racing engine for Type 718 and 718/2, 148 to 150 HP
547/4	1957	1.6-liter racing engine for Type 718, 160 HP
547/5	1957	1.7-liter racing engine for Type 718, 170 HP
547/5A		1.7-liter racing engine for Elva with axial flow fan, 170 HP
547/6		1.8-liter racing engine with axial flow fan, 185 to 190 HP
549		Porsche-Schmid synchronized transmission for Fuller USA
550	1953–1954	Porsche 550 Spyder, mid-engined two-seat sports-racing car
550A	1956	Redesigned Type 550 with tubular space frame
551		Porsche-Schmid synchronized 3-speed Getrag gearbox for DKW Auto Union
552		Porsche-Schmid synchronized 4-speed Getrag gearbox for DKW Auto Union
553		Porsche-Schmid synchronized 5-speed Getrag gearbox for Hanomag
554	1952	Various plastic designwork
555		Volkswagen prototypes
556		Vidal & Sohn Tempo delivery truck design with Porsch 1.5-liter engine and gearbox
557		Porsche 1.5L engine for USA
558		Porsche-Schmid synchronized Getrag gearbox for Spicer (USA)
559		Porsche-Schmid synchronized transmission study
560		Porsche-Schmid synchronized gearbox for Maseratie Grand Prix car
561		Porsche-Schmid synchronized gearbox for Lancia Carro V10 truck
562		Porsche-Schmid synchronized gearbox for Alfa Romeo T140A
563		Porsche-Schmid synchronized gearbox for Alfa Romeo T750
564		Porsche-Schmid synchronized gearbox for Lancia Aurelia Vettura B10
565		Porsche-Schmid synchronized gearbox for Magirus Truck
566		Porsche-Schmid synchronized gearbox for DKW delivery van
567		Porsche-Schmid synchronized gearbox for Bianchi
568	1953	Fletcher exhaust induced jet-ejector cooling for air-cooled engines
569		Transmission design for Massey-Harris combine harvester
570		Porsche-Schmid synchronized Getrag gearbox for a passenger car with Kuchen motor
571		Porsche-Schmid synchronized gearbox for Daimler-Benz race car
572		Porsche-Schmid synchronized gearbox for Clark (USA)
573		Porsche-Schmid synchronized gearbox for Goliath
574		Electrical clutch for the Porsche 356
575	1953	Experimental self-leveling suspension for Porsche 356
576		Porsche-Schmid synchronized gearbox for Volvo car
577	1953	Experimental Dunlop disc brakes for the Porsche 356
578		Porsche Fouga hydraulic clutch
579		Porsche-Schmid synchronized gearbox for Lancia Appia
580		Porsche-Schmid synchronized 4-speed Getrag gearbox for DKW Auto Union
581		Porsche-Schmid synchronized 4-speed Getrag gearbox for Opel Truck
582		Schmid synchronized Lancia gearbox for Lancia Grand Prix car
583		Porsche-Schmid synchronized 8-speed gearbox for Pegaso truck
584		Porsche-Schmid synchronized gearbox for Daimler-Benz Truck
585		Porsche-Schmid synchronized gearbox for Alfa Romeo race car
586		Porsche-Schmid synchronized gearbox for Simca Aronde
587	1961	2.0-liter racing engine based on type 547, used for Type 718
587/1	1961–1962	Touring version of Type 587 for Carrera 2
587/2	1963	Racing version of Type 587/1
587/3	1963–1964	Improved 2.0-liter racing engine for Type 904
588	1953	Transmission for Type 587 2.0-liter engine
589	1953–1954	1.3-liter sports engine for Type 356, 1300S
589/2	1954–1955	Type 589 with three-piece crankcase
590		Berg Achsen partly servo assisted front brake
591		Porsche-Schmid synchronized gearbox for Daimler-Benz 180
592		Porsche 2-liter engine
593	1953	Porsche 4-speed gearbox
594		ILO industrial engine
595		Porsche engine study, Prof. Nestorovic
596		Porsche two cylinder industrial engine
597	1954–1955	Porsche Jagdwagen, four-wheel-drive military/utility vehicle
598		Porsche-Schmid synchronized 10-speed gearbox for Berliet truck
599		Porsche-Schmid synchronized 5-speed gearbox for Renodin & Losson Truck
600		Porsche-Schmid synchronized Getrag gearbox for Magirus truck
601		Porsche-Schmid synchronized gearbox for Getrag (various studies)
602		Porsche-Schmid synchronized gearbox for Hotchkiss passenger car
603		Porsche-Schmid synchronized gearbox for a Maserati 2-liter sports car
604		Porsche-Schmid synchronized gearbox for Getrag EW677
605		Gearbox for Allgaier AP144 tractor
606		1.5-liter underfloor engine for Volkswagen
607	1954	Porsche-Schmid synchronized gearbox for the Bugatti T.251 Grand Prix race car
608		Porsche-Schmid synchronized gearbox design of the Unic B176
609		Porsche-Schmid synchronized gearbox design of the Unic B178
610		Porsche-Schmid synchronized gearbox design of the Getrag EW681-0
611	1954	Porsche-Schmid synchronized gearbox for a Ferrari Grand Prix race car
612		Porsche-Schmid synchronized gearbox design for Getrag, used in the Auto Union DKW F91 passenger car
613		Porsche-Schmid synchronized gearbox design for a Heinemann Machine tool
614		Porsche-Schmid 5-speed synchronized gearbox for a Berliet truck
615		Hydraulic motor mount
616/1	1955–1956	1.6-liter engine for Type 356A, 1600
616/2	1955–1956	1.6-liter sports engine for Type 356A, 1600S
616/3	1956	Industrial version of Type 616/1
616/7	1960	90-horsepower engine for Type 356B, 1600S-90 or Super 90
616/12	1961–1962	Type 616/2 with cast-iron cylinders for Type 356B
616/15	1963–1964	1.6-liter engine for Type 356C, 1600C
616/16	1963–1964	1.6-liter sports engine for Type 356C, 1600SC
616/36	1965	1.6-liter engine for Type 912
616/39	1967–1968	Type 616/36 with US. emission control
617		Evaluation of D'Ieteren Piatti Scooter
618		Porsche-Schmid synchronized gearbox design for Vidal (Getrag)
619		Study of a Volkswagen diesel engine
620		Study for Volkswagen
621		Single cylinder tractor engine design for Allgaier
622		Two cylinder tractor engine design for Allgaier
623		Three cylinder tractor engine design for Allgaier
624		Four cylinder tractor engine design for Allgaier
627		Swing axle with strut system on the frame for Volkswagen
628		Ventilation heat exchanger for Volkswagen
629		Porsche diesel engine study
630		Single cylinder diesel engine for the Allgaier AP 16
631		Porsche diesel engine study
632	1954	Experimental car based on the 356
633	1954	Limousine design for Studebaker
634		IMA Selbstaufleger
635		Mannesmann Calculations
638		Study of a V6 engine with 1.2 and 1.6-liter for Volkswagen
639		Swing axle with lower pivot point for Volkswagen
640		Porsche-Schmid 3-speed synchronized gearbox for a BMW passenger car
641		Porsche-Schmid 4-speed synchronized gearbox for a BMW passenger car
642		Porsche-Schmid synchronized gearbox design for BMW (ZF)
643		4-speed gearbox for Type 356
644	1957	Four-speed tunnel-case transmission housing with the inner components from Type 519. Used in the Porsche 356B
645	1956	Experimental sports-racing car, "Mickey Mouse"
646		Study of a Porsche marine engine
647		Porsche-Schmid synchronized gearbox for the Ferrari 250
648		Porsche-Schmid synchronized gearbox for David Brown Engineering Limited
649		Porsche-Schmid synchronized gearbox for Lloyd (Getrag)
650		Automatic clutch for F&S
651		General construction drawings
652		Roller drive pump design for Mannesmann
653		Porsche-Schmid synchronized gearbox for a ME forklift
654		Recovery installation for type 97
655		50cc moped engine
656	1954	Porsche sports-car study for 1956
661		1-cylinder stationary engine for Allgaier
662		2-cylinder stationary engine for Allgaier
663		3-cylinder stationary engine for Allgaier
664		4-cylinder stationary engine for Allgaier
665		Porsche-Schmid 4-speed synchronized gearbox for a BMW passenger car
666		Porsche-Schmid synchronized gearbox for Simca
667		Porsche-Schmid 5-speed synchronized gearbox for a BMW passenger car
668	1955	Porsche-Schmid synchronized gearbox for the Mercedes SLR
669	1955	Porsche-Schmid synchronized 5-speed gearbox for Porsche Rennsport, based on Type 519
670		Competitor Investigation
671		Porsche-Schmid synchronized gearbox for Volkswagen
672		Small car design with underfloor engine for Volkswagen
673		6-cylinder underfloor engine with 1.2, 1.5 or 1.6 liter capacity
674		Porsche-Schmid synchronized gearbox for Renondin Losson 60 mkg
675		Small car study for Volkswagen
676		1.2-liter underfloor engine
677		Porsche-Schmid synchronized gearbox for Volkswagen with a support ring synchromesh
678	1959	1.6-liter aircraft engine line
678/1	1959	65 hp aircraft engine, reduction gear
678/3	1959	52 hp aircraft engine, direct drive
678/4	1959	75 hp aircraft engine, reduction gear
679		Porsche-Schmid 5-speed synchronized gearbox for Ford (Getrag)
680		Porsche 1.2-liter stationary engine, 12HP with carburetor
681		Body design for NSU Prinz 30
682		Porsche-Schmid synchronized gearbox for a Hermes passenger car
683		Porsche-Schmid synchronized gearbox for the Meadows 250 C 5
684		Porsche-Schmid synchronized gearbox for the Meadows 350 C 5
685		Cooling for a PM Stationary engine
686		Porsche-Schmid synchronized gearbox for the Alfa Romeo standard gearbox
687	1956	Porsche-Schmid synchronized Gearbox for Vanwall Grand Prix car
688		Porsche-Schmid synchronized gearbox for a Volvo sports car
689		Porsche-Schmid synchronized gearbox for a Fröhlich sports car
690	1958	Five-speed tunnel-case transmission for Type 718
691	1956	Porsche 550 RS Spyder
692	1958	Improved four-camshaft engine for Carrera
692/0	1958	1.5-liter Type 692 with roller-bearing crankshaft
692/1	1958	1.5-liter Type 692 with plain-bearing crankshaft
692/2	1958–1959	1.6-liter plain-bearing Type 692 for touring Carrera
692/3	1959	GT racing version of Type 692/3
692/3A	1961	Improved Type 692/3 with Schleifsteine
693	1956	1.3-liter version of four-cam Type 547
694		Cross-country study of type 597
695	1956–1959	T7 Design study for successor to the 356
696		Volvo truck gearbox
697		Porsche Aebi 5-speed gearbox
698		Getrag Miak Hubgetriebe
699		Hurt gearbox
700		Study for a large Volkswagen car
701		Vega gearbox for Bond & Mouson
702	1956	Special Gyrodyne helicopter version of Type 678
703	1956	Improvements to 1.6-liter production engine
704		Diesel engine
705		B263 4-speed gearbox for Austin
706		B268 4-speed gearbox for Austin
707		Adjustable steering column for Simca
708		Adjustable steering column for Simca
709		Study for gearbox
710		Gearbox for type 356 with improved synchronization
711		4-cylinder diesel engine
712		Gearbox for bulldozer
713		Primary gearbox
714	1963	Leopard 1 tank with MTU 37.4-liter 830 PS Diesel engine built by Krauss-Maffei
715		Gearbox test stand
716	1959	Four-speed transmission for Type 356A with improved synchromesh
717		Gearbox for Ford
718	1957	Porsche 718 RSK mid-engined sports-racing car
718/2	1959	1.5-liter single-seater racing car
718	2017	Commercial designation for type 982
719	1957	1.5-liter air cooled racing engine with fuel injection, successor of the 718 RSK carburetor engine
720		Gearbox design for Getrag, used in a Magirus Truck
721		Humber gearbox
722		Flat engine suitable for underfloor mounting for Volkswagen Type 3
723		Initial study for a special vehicle for the Bundesamt für Verfassungsschutz
724		1.4-liter engine with improved cooling system
725		Gearbox for a Simca truck
726		2 different body designs on a modified Volkswagen chassis
727		Porsche synchronized gearbox for Volkswagen
728		Further development of the Type 675 small car
729	1958	Inboard marine engine, based on Type 616
730		5-speed gearbox design for Getrag, used in a For truck
731		General gearbox study for external customers
732		Gearbox design for Getrag, used in an Auto Union small car
733		Gearbox design for Austin, Series A
734		Double differential for the Hotchkiss Chenillette
735		Gearbox design for Getrag, used in a Steinbeck forklift
736		Gearbox design for Villiers
737		Outboard marine engine
738		Further development of the Volkswagen controller type 2007
739		V-belt transmission for Volkswagen
740		Gearbox for Fuller 5-C-72
741	1958–1960	Four-speed transmission for Type 356B
741/A	1961–1962	Four-speed transmission for Type 356B and 356C
742	1959	Design of chassis for four-wheel drive
743		Calculations of small scale
744		3-speed gearbox for Unic
745	1962	Experimental 2.0- and 2.2-liter six-cylinder engines (number later changed into 821)
746		Gearbox design for Austin, Series A
747		Gearbox design for external customer
748		Gearbox design for Fuller 5-A-33
749		5-speed gearbox design for a Dennis truck
750		NSU tracked vehicle
751		Volkswagen gearbox with automatic clutch
752		Volkswagen 1-liter flat engine
753	1959–1962	1.5-liter flat-eight-cylinder engine for Type 804 Formula 1 car
754	1961	Prototype for rear-engined successor (T7) to 356 (T6), based on Type 695
755		Design of the synchronization for a Mercedes truck transmission
756		Body and Chassis for the special series 356B Carrera GTL Abarth (21 built)
757		Foden Transfer gearbox
758		Design of the synchronization for a Fiat truck transmission
759		Porsche 4-speed inverted drive gearbox
760		Hurth 2-speed inverted drive gearbox
761		Design of the synchronization for a Hotchkiss truck transmission
762		Design of the synchronization for a Fiat 5-speed truck transmission type 2814.100
763		Design for a series production seat
764		Volkswagen six-seater saloon
765		Design of the synchronization for a Simca 3 and 4-speed transmission
766		Design of the synchronization for a Fiat 4-speed truck transmission type 2814.100
767		Design of the synchronization for the DKW Junior transmission
768		Porsche 1.6-liter engine with fuel injection
769		Voith differential for Porsche sports car
770		Design of the synchronization for a Ford (USA) transmission
771	1960–1962	2.0- and 2.2-liter sports-racing versions of Type 753 F1 engine
772		Research into air cooled rotating compressors and vacuum pumps (K. Witting)
773		Leopard 1 derivative
774		Lancia 8-speed truck transmission
775		6-speed gearbox for a Porsche Diesel tractor
776		Design of the synchronization for an Eaton (USA) 3-speed transmission
777		Design of the synchronization for Meadows 4-speed passenger car transmission
778		1.0-liter engine with rotating cylinders (80 PS)
779		Design of the synchronization for a Falcon transmission
780		Design of the synchronization for a Fiat 5-speed truck transmission (55 mkg)
781		Design of the synchronization for an Auto-Union transmission
782		Alvis truck transmission
783		Ford (US) 4-speed transmission
784		Single valve diesel engine (after Prof. Dobrosavljevic)
785		Transmission for an Alfa Romeo small car
786		Transmission for a train
787	1960–1961	Formula 1 chassis
788		Hurth fork lift transmission
789		Fiat rear transmission
790		Ford police car transmission
792		Inboard marine engine
793		Design of the synchronization for an external customer
794		Design of the synchronization for a Renaudin & Losson truck transmission
795		BMC (Austin) truck transmission
796		Ford (US) transmission for a Taxi
797		Design of the synchronization for a BMW transmission used in a 1.3-liter passenger car
798		Chassis and transmission for the "Le Mans GT" Porsche 356B Carrera 2000 GS/GT
799		Design of the synchronization for the Volvo K 50 transmission
800	1951	Number reserved at that time for Dr. Keckstein
801		1.6 and 1.8-liter 4-cylinder boxer engine
802	1961	Four-cylinder engine with fuel injection (Michael May design)
803		Design of the synchronization for a Hurth fork lift transmission
804	1962	Formula 1 chassis with Type 753 engine
805		Transmission for a Ford (Köln) truck
806		Enlarged design of the synchronization of the Villiers transmission type 736
807	1961	"Bergepanzer 2" Armoured recovery vehicle based on the Leopard 1 chassis
808		Design of the synchronization for a 1.5 to truck gearbox
809		Design of the synchronization for a 2.0 to truck gearbox
810		Design of the synchronization for a Hardy-Spicer inverted drive gearbox
811		Research on compressor engines (K. Wittig)
812		Fiat truck transmission 116.100
813		Bernhard truck transmission
814		Leopard 1 tank derivative
815		Design of the synchronization for a BMW transmission used with 2.6 and 3.2-liter engines
816		Special transmission for ZF
817		Hurth fork lift transmission type 847
818		Fiat truck transmission (35 mkg)
819		Mercedes passenger car transmission F-101-S
820		Design of the synchronization for a Volkswagen transmission
821	1961	2.0-liter six-cylinder engine for the Porsche 911 (number changed from type 745)
822		5 and 6-speed gearbox design for the Type 771 engine
901	1963	Six-cylinder production sports car (T8), renamed 911
901/0	1964–1965	Five-speed transmission for Type 911
901/01	1964–1965	130 hp engine for Type 911
901/02	1966–1967	160 hp engine for Type 911S; five-speed transmission
901/03	1967–1968	110 hp engine for Type 911T; five-speed transmission
901/05	1966	Type 901/01 with Weber carburetors
901/06	1966–1967	Type 901/05 with revised valve timing
901/07	1967–1968	Type 901/06 equipped for Sportomatic
901/08	1967–1968	Type 901/02 equipped for Sportomatic
901/09	1968–1969	Fuel-injected engine for 911E
901/10	1968–1969	Fuel-injected engine for Type 911S; four-speed transmission
901/13	1967–1968	Type 901/03 equipped for Sportomatic
901/14	1967–1968	Type 901/06 (130 hp) with US. emission control
901/17	1967–1968	Type 901/14 equipped for Sportomatic
901/20	1966	210 hp engine for Type 906, Carrera 6
901/21	1966–1967	Fuel-injected Type 901/20 for Type 906E and 910/6
901/22	1967	210 hp engine for Type 911R
901/30	1968	150 hp Rally Kit for Type 911L
902	1964	Four-cylinder production sports car with type 616/36 engine, renamed 912
902/0	1965–1966	Four-speed transmission for Type 912 and 911
902/01	1967–1968	Four-speed transmission for Type 912
902/02	1967–1968	Five-speed transmission for Type 912
902/1	1965–1966	Five-speed transmission for Type 912 and 911
903	1965	Experimental three-speed torque converter automatic transmission
904	1963–1964	Mid-engined Carrera GTS GT class competition coupe with flat-4 engine
904/6	1964	(unofficial) Type 904 with six-cylinder engine
904/8	1964	(unofficial) Type 904 with eight-cylinder 771 engine
905/00	1967–1968	Four-speed Sportomatic transmission
905/01	1967–1968	Four-speed Sportomatic, alternate gear ratios
905/13	1968–1969	Four-speed Sportomatic transmission
905/20	1969–1970	Four-speed Sportomatic transmission
905/21	1970–1971	Four-speed Sportomatic transmission
906	1966	Space-framed competition coupe for Sports Category
906/8	1966	(unofficial) Type 906 with eight-cylinder engine
906E	1966–1967	Type 906 with fuel injection, modified body
907	1968	Right-hand-drive sports-racing coupe, short tail
907L	1967–1968	Type 907 with long tail for fast circuits
908	1967–1968	Experimental three-speed torque-converter automatic transmission
908	1968	3.0-liter eight-cylinder sports-racing engine and car
908/1	1969	Type 908 with long-tail coupe body, elevons
908/2	1969	Type 908 with open Spyder body
908/3	1970	Type 908 Spyder with forward-placed engine and driver as in the 909
908K	1968	Type 908 with short-tail coupe body
908L	1968	Type 908 with long-tail coupe body
908/80	1980	908 chassis updated to 936 specification
909	1968	2.0-liter Spyder for hill-climb competition
910	1966–1967	Sports-racing evolution of the 906 with 13-inch wheels
910/6	1967	Type 910 with 2.0-liter six-cylinder engine, Type 901/21
910/8	1967	Type 910 with 2.2-liter eight-cylinder engine, Type 771
910/8B	1967–1968	Lightened 2.0-liter Type 910/8 for hillclimb competition
911	1964–1965	Commercial designation of Type 901
911/00	1969–1970	Four-speed transmission for Type 911T
911/01	1969–1970	2.2-liter engine for Type 911E; five-speed transmission
911/02	1969–1970	2.2-liter 180 hp engine for Type 911S
911/03	1969–1970	2.2-liter engine for manual European Type 911T
911/04	1969–1970	Type 911/01 engine equipped for Sportomatic
911/06	1969–1970	Type 911/03 equipped for Sportomatic
911/07	1969–1970	2.2-liter engine for manual American Type 911T
911/08	1969–1970	Type 911/07 equipped for Sportomatic
911/20	1970	2,247 cc racing engine for competition 911S
911/21	1971	2,381 cc racing engine for competition 911S
911/22	1970	Type 911/20 with carburetors instead of fuel injection
911/41	1974–1975	2.7-liter engine for Type 911
911/42	1974–1975	2.7-liter engine for Type 911S
911/43	1974–1975	2.7-liter engine for federal 49-state Type 911
911/44	1974–1975	2.7-liter engine for California Type 911
911/46	1974–1975	Type 911/41 equipped for Sportomatic
911/47	1974–1975	Type 911/42 equipped for Sportomatic
911/48	1974–1975	Type 911/43 equipped for Sportomatic
911/49	1974–1975	Type 911/44 equipped for Sportomatic
911/51	1971–1972	2.4-liter engine for American Type 911T
911/52	1971–1972	2.4-liter engine for Type 911E
911/53	1971–1972	2.4-liter engine for Type 911S
911/57	1971–1972	2.4-liter engine for European Type 911T
911/61	1971–1972	Type 911/51 equipped for Sportomatic
911/62	1971–1972	Type 911/52 equipped for Sportomatic
911/63	1971–1972	Type 911/53 equipped for Sportomatic
911/67	1971–1972	Type 911/57 equipped for Sportomatic
911/70	1971	2,494 cc racing engine for competition 911S
911/72	1972–1973	2.8-liter racing engine for competition 911S, Carrera RSR
911/73	1972	2,466 cc racing engine for competition 911S
911/74	1973	3.0-liter racing engine for Carrera RSR
911/75	1973	Type 911/74 with slide instead of butterfly throttles
911/76	1974	2.1-liter supercharged engine for Carrera RSR Turbo 2.1
911/77	1973–1974	3.0-liter engine for Carrera RS
911/81	1975–1976	2.7-liter engine for Type 911
911/82	1975–1976	2.7-liter engine for Federal 49-state Type 911S
911/83	1972–1973	2.7-liter engine for Carrera RS
911/84	1975–1976	2.7-liter engine for California Type 911S
911/86	1975–1976	Type 911/81 equipped for Sportomatic
911/89	1975–1976	2.7-liter engine for America equipped for Sportomatic
911/91	1973	2.4-liter CIS-injection engine for American Type 911T
911/92	1973–1974	2.7-liter engine for Type 911
911/93	1973–1974	2.7-liter engine for Type 911S and American Carrera
911/96	1973	Type 911/91 equipped for Sportomatic
911/97	1973–1974	Type 911/92 equipped for Sportomatic
911/98	1973–1974	Type 911/93 equipped for Sportomatic
911E	1968–1969	Fuel-injected model between Type 911T and 911S
911L	1967–1968	Top-line model in America; intermediate model in Europe
911R	1967	Lightweight racing model of Type 911S
911S	1966–1967	Higher-performance touring model of Type 911
911T	1967–1968	Type 911 model tuned for all-round road performance
912	1965	Commercial designation of type 902
912	1968	4.5-liter twelve-cylinder racing engine with transaxle for the type 920 chassis
912E	1975–1976	Fuel-injected four-cylinder version of Type 911
913	1968	Study for three-cylinder air-cooled DOHC engine
914	1968	Study for four-cylinder air-cooled DOHC engine
914	1969–1970	Mid-engined production car, four-cylinder engine
914/6	1969–1970	Six-cylinder version of Type 914
914/8	1969	Type 914/6 with Type 908 three-liter engine
914/11	1969–1970	Five-speed transmission for Type 914 and 914/6
914/12	1972–1973	Five-speed transmission for Type 914
915	1968–1969	Four-passenger 911 studies with 2,560 mm (100.8 in) wheelbase
915	1971–1972	Stronger four- or five-speed transmission for Type 911
915/06	1973–1974	Five-speed transmission for Types 911, 911S, Carrera
915/08	1972–1973	Five-speed transmission for Carrera RS
915/12	1971–1972	Four-speed transmission for Types 911T, 911E, 911S
915/16	1973–1974	Four-speed transmission for Types 911, 911S, Carrera
915/40	1974–1975	Five-speed transmission for Type 911S and U.S. Carrera
915/43	1974–1975	Five-speed transmission for Type 911
915/44	1975–1976	Five-speed transmission for Type 911 and US 911S
915/45	1974–1975	Four-speed transmission for Type 911S
915/48	1974–1975	Four-speed transmission for Type 911
915/49	1975–1976	Four-speed transmission for Type 911
915/50	1977	Transaxle for racing 911 Carrera
916	1967–1968	Twin-overhead-camshaft racing version of Type 901
916	1968	Five-speed transmission for Type 908/01 and 908/02 6-cylinder
916	1971	Projected top-line 2.4-liter edition of Type 914/6
917	1969	4.5-liter sports-racing coupe for Sports Category
917/10	1971–1972	Spyder edition of Type 917 for Can-Am competition
917/20	1971	Type 917K with SERA-designed low-drag coupe body
917/30	1973	Spyder developed from Type 917/10 for Can-Am competition
917K	1969–1970	Short-tail developed version of Type 917
917L	1970	Long-tail version of Type 917 for Le Mans competition
917PA	1969	Spyder body on Type 917 chassis for Can-Am competition
918	1968–1969	Studies of 1973-model-year mid-engined production sports car
918	1968–1969	Study of 3.2-liter (85.0 x 70.4 mm) eight-cylinder engine for Type 918
918	2013	Mid-engined plug-in hybrid sports car
919	1969	PDK prototype transmission for production Porsches
919	2014–2017	Commercial designation of the type 9RD, a 2.0L hybrid sports-racing car for LMP1 category
920	1969	Chassis of Type 917 sports-racing car
920	2019	Porsche 920 Vision, design study of an extreme hypercar with aerodynamically optimized body and central cockpit making it a roadgoing track car.
921	1969	4x4 gas-turbine-powered sports-racing coupe study
922	1969	Four-valve version of Type 912 engine for Type 917 (see 927)
922	1978	Three-speed automatic transmission for Type 928
923	1975–1976	2.0-liter engine for Type 912E
924	1970	Four-cylinder engine for H-Program
924	1976–1977	Front-engined four-cylinder production car with transaxle
925/00	1971–1972	Four-speed Sportomatic for Type 911T and 911E
925/01	1971–1972	Four-speed Sportomatic for Type 911S
925/02	1973–1974	Four-speed Sportomatic for Type 911, 911S and U.S. Carrera
925/09	1975–1976	Three-speed Sportomatic for Type 911
925/10	1974–1975	Three-speed Sportomatic for US. Type 911S and Carrera
925/12	1975–1976	Three-speed Sportomatic for Type 911 and US. 911S
926	1973	Design for Porsche off-road production car
927	1970	Reserved for four-valve version of Type 917's engine (see 922)
928	1970	Eight-cylinder engine for H-Program
928	1971	Experimental liquid-cooled 32-valve 908 eight-cylinder engine
928	1977–1978	Front-engined V8 production sports car with transaxle
928/2746	1978–1985	928-based aluminum body studies with Alusingen and Alusuisse
928-4	1984	Special 928 with wheelbase 250 mm longer
928/70	1986	Turbocharged marine racing version of Type 928 V-8
929	1973	"Turbo Sport Carrera"
930	1974–1975	Turbo and Turbo Carrera, production car based on Type 911
930/01	1977	3.0-liter six-cylinder engine for Airship Industries Skyship 500
930/07	1980	3.0-liter 911 SC engine for United States and Canada
930/08	1980	3.0-liter 911 SC engine for Japan
930/09	1980	3.0-liter 911 SC engine for rest of world
930/10	1974–1975	Turbo-supercharged engine of Type 930
930/20	1984	3.2-liter 911 Carrera engine for rest of world
930/21	1984	3.2-liter 911 Carrera engine for USA and Japan
930/30	1974–1975	Four-speed transaxle for Type 930 Turbo
930/34	1983	Special Type 930 transaxle for Swiss market's noise limits
930/60	1978	3.3-liter 911 Turbo for rest of world
930/61	1978	3.3-liter 911 Turbo for United States (49 states)
930/62	1978	3.3-liter 911 Turbo for Japan
930/63	1978	3.3-liter 911 Turbo for California
930/67	1977	3.3-liter six-cylinder engine for Airship Industries Skyship 600
931	1976	Turbocharged 924 engine for potential record-breaker
931	1978	924 Turbo left-hand drive
"932"	1989	Panamera II Study By Italdesign, alternative to the type 989. Project cancelled and never shown to the public
932	1978	924 Turbo right-hand drive
933	1979	Studies of special 924 for SCCA racing
933	1981–1990	3.2-liter light airplane engine, marketed as PFM 3200
934	1975–1976	Group 4 racing version of Type 930 Turbo coupe
935	1976	Group 5 racing version of Type 930 Turbo coupe
935/77	1977	Group 5 car and engine for 1977 season
935/79	1985	Improved customer engine for 956 and 962C
935/82	1986	3.0-liter liquid-cooled engine for 962C
935/2.0	1977	"Baby," ultra-light 1,425 cc Group 5 racing 911
936	1976	2.1-liter turbocharged Spyder for Group 6 competition
936/81	1981	936 rebuilt for Le Mans 1981 with 935/76 four-cam engine
937	1980	924 Carrera GT left-hand drive
937/50	1980	Five-speed transaxle for 924 Carrera GTP
938	1980	924 Carrera GT right-hand drive
939	1980	924 Carrera GTP for Le Mans
939	1981	924 Carrera GTS Rallye
939	1981	924 Carrera GTR
940	1980	Indycar Project for Interscope Racing
941		Design study for a Porsche 924 Targa left-hand drive
942		Design study for a Porsche 924 Targa right-hand drive
942	1984	Extended 928, one-off design for the 75th birthday of Ferry Porsche
943	1990	Four-speed Tiptronic automatic for 911 Carrera 2
944	1982	2.5-liter four-cylinder production car, left-hand drive
945	1982	2.5-liter four-cylinder production car, right-hand drive
946	1985	924S left-hand drive
947	1980	Initial project for four-speed 928S automatic, later Type 960
947	1985	924S right-hand drive
948	1981	Aluminum-body experiment based on 928 (see also 2746/2756)
948		V8 engine for the Cayenne
949	1981	16-valve turbo engine and transaxle for Le Mans 924 GTP racer
950	1986–1998	Transaxle for production 911, 85 mm shaft separation
951	1989	Type/Model designation considered for 964 Turbo
951	1984	944 Turbo left-hand drive
952	1984	944 Turbo right-hand drive
953	1984	4x4 version of 911 Carrera for Paris-Dakar Rally
954	1983	911SC/RS Group B evolution of 911SC
955	2003	1st generation of the Cayenne
956	1982	Group C sports-racing car
957	2008	Update of the first generation Cayenne including the GTS model and the Transsyberia racing version
957		Design study for a Porsche 944 Turbo GT Left-hand drive
958		Design study for a Porsche 944 Turbo GT Right-hand drive
958	2010	2nd generation of the Cayenne including the first S-Hybrid
959	1987	Four-wheel-drive limited-production sports car
959/50	1987	2,849 cc twin-turbo six powering Type 959
960	1980	Porsche Experimental Structure (PES) study vehicle
960	1983	Planned evolution version of Type 959 for Group B competition
960	1983	Four-speed automatic transmission for 928S
960	2016	Porsche Tourismo Vision, experimental study of a super sports car with four doors and a rear engine, served as a blueprint for the development of the Taycan
961	1983	Planned 911 Turbo based on Type 959
961	1986	Competition version of Type 959
961/70	1986	Turbocharged engine of Type 961
962	1984	Type 956 modified to meet IMSA regulations
962C	1985	Type 962 adapted to requirements of Group C racing
963		5-speed gear box for the 911 J programme
963	2022	Commercial designation of the type 9RD LMDh, a twin-turbo V8 hybrid sports-racing car
964	1988–1993	3rd generation of the 911
965	1988	Planned range-topping four-cam twin-turbo 911 Carrera variant
966	1986	911 Speedster initial development project
968	1992	Marketing designation of Type 944S3
969	1988	Planned marketing designation for Type 965
970	2010	1st generation of the Panamera 4-door sports car
971	2016	2nd generation of the Panamera 4-door sports car
974	2017	Panamera Sport Turismo
976	2024	3rd generation of the Panamera 4-door sports car
980	2004	Carrera GT V-10 mid-engined supercar
981	2012–2016	3rd generation of the Boxster and Cayman
982	2016–	Revision of the 981 Boxster and Cayman and now branded "718"
984	1984–1987	"Porsche Junior" study of small rear-engined sports car
985		Porsche PVR
986	1996	1st generation Boxster mid-engined production sports car
987	2005–2012	2nd generation Boxster and Cayman mid-engined production sports car
988		Planned successor to the 987
989	1989	Planned four-door four-seat production Porsche with 3.6-liter V-8
991	2011–2019	7th generation of the 911
992	2019–	8th generation of the 911
993	1993–1998	4th-generation "911" Carrera and Carrera 4 production sports cars
995	1978–1979	3.0-liter V8 low-drag aluminum-body study for German government, based on the 928
996	1998–2004	5th generation of the 911
997	2004–2011	6th generation of the 911
1764		Volkswagen Car, engine and drive train
1778		Volkswagen 1.3-liter engine
1817		Volkswagen van with diesel engine (Study)
1821		Volkswagen sportomatic gearbox VW Typ 1
1834	1966	Studies of future 1.3-liter air-cooled Volkswagen configurations
1837		Volkswagen 2.5-liter engine and gearbox for Typ 1764
1866	1967–1969	Prototypes of new model for Volkswagen with 4-cylinder underfloor engine
1866/60	1968	Vee-inclined overhead-valve twin-cam engine for project 1866
1866/70	1969	Hatchback rear-engined design for VW developed into 1966
1872		Variation on type 1866 for Volkswagen
1906	1970	Leopard 2 tank with MTU 12 cylinder, 39.8 L 1500 PS Diesel engine, built by Krauss-Maffei
1928	1970	Helicopter cockpit and cabin design
1966	1970–1971	Projected 4-cylinder underfloor-engine production Volkswagen (EA266)
1983	1972	Racing transaxle for Automobiles Matra
1989	1973–1975	Long-life car studies
1997	1973	Urban car studies, two-cylinder air-cooled rear mounted engine for F&S
2006		Tracked Allgaier
2054		Allgaier test vehicle with T25 gearbox and type 2066 engine
2066		Allgaier 2-cylinder diesel engine with 20 PS
2086		Single cylinder diesel tractor engine for Allgaier. 88 x 96mm, 584cc, 20:1 compression ration, 12 PS at 3000rpm, swirl chamber injection with pintle nozzle and rod glow plug. Dry weight 150 kg
2087		Two cylinder diesel tractor engine for Allgaier. Based on Type 2086 but with 1168 cc capacity and 24 PS at 3000rpm, Dry weight 180 kg
2088		Three cylinder diesel tractor engine for Allgaier. Based on Type 2086 but with 1752 cc capacity and 36 PS at 3000rpm, Dry weight 210 kg
2089		Four cylinder diesel tractor engine for Allgaier. Based on Type 2086 but with 2336 cc capacity and 48 PS at 3000rpm, Dry weight 242 kg
2093		Allgaier test vehicle based on the Standard Star 219
2108	1980–1984	1.3-liter front-drive Lada family car refined for AvtoVaz, Russia
2304	1974–1983	"Weasel" motorized artillery piece
2305	1974–1983	"Weasel" motorized artillery piece
2502	1974	Study of rear-drive 1.8-liter range for Far Eastern producer
2508	1974–1976	Design of four- and six-cylinder rear-drive automobile range
2539	1975	SAVE mobile medical-assistance project for the Technology Ministry (see 2614)
2554	1977	Project number for airship engines 930/01 and 930/67
2564	1978–1985	Air-cooled vee engines from 500 to 1,500 cc for Harley-Davidson
2567		Orbit Fire engine research project for the Bundesministerium der Finanzen
2584	1978–1985	Production-ready 800 cc V-4 for Harley Davidson
2590	1980–1981	Four-passenger electric car study with sodium-sulphur batteries
2603	1980–1984	Airliner cockpit layout for Airbus Industrie
2612	1986	Five-speed PDK transaxle for racing 962C
2612/01	1986	Lightened version of five-speed racing PDK
2614	1984	SAVE mobile medical assistance project for the Technology Ministry (see 2539)
2616	1981–1985	1.2- and 1.5-liter four-cylinder engines for Seat, Spain
2620	1981–1984	Forklift truck designs for Linde
2623	1983–1987	1.5-liter turbocharged V-6 for TAG, known as TAG-P01
2640	1983	Quiet-running motorcycle designs
2642	1983	Quiet-running motorcycle designs
2656	1981–1983	Porsche-powered VW Transporter/Vanagon "B32"
2696	1986	Porsche Experimental Prototype (PEP) test vehicle
2708	1985–1990	CART/Indy series car used by the March team
2708/80	1985–1990	9M0 engine, 2.65-liter turbocharged V 8 engine for Type 2708
2746		Study for a Porsche 928 with aluminum body
2747	1988	Proposed PFF (Porsche Vehicle Family)
2756		Study for a Porsche 928 with aluminum body
2758	1990–1995	Mercedes 500E/E500 assembly
2800	1990–1991	Studies of 3512-powered car for World Sportscar Championship
2804	1988	Four-cylinder engine derived from 2708
2806	1988	Six-cylinder engine derived from 2708
2808	1988	Eight-cylinder engine derived from 2708
2812		Twelve-cylinder engine derived from 2708
2815	1991	Porsche open top Le Mans race car for 1991
2862	1994–1995	Audi RS 2 Avant assembly
2889	1994	Porsche C88
2909	2001	Harley Davidson Revolution motorcycle engine
3200	1981	Marketing designation of the Type 933 light aircraft engine
3512	1990–1991	9M1 engine. 3.5-liter V12 engine for Footwork Arrows Grand Prix cars
92A	2010	2nd generation of the Cayenne SUV
95B	2014	Macan SUV
9J1	2019	Porsche Taycan
Y1A	2019	Porsche Taycan
Y1B	2021	Porsche Taycan Cross Turismo
Y1C	2022	Porsche Taycan Sport Turismo
9PA	2002	1st generation of the Cayenne SUV
9R1	1996	Porsche 911 GT1
9R2	1999	LMP version of 911 GT1 (test vehicle)
9R3	1998–2000	Porsche LMP2000, Le Mans Prototype racing car design, never used for racing
9R6	2004	Porsche RS Spyder, LMP2 class racing car
9R9	2014	Porsche 919 Hybrid, 2.0L hybrid sports-racing car for LMP1 category
9RD	2022	Porsche 963 LMDh, a twin-turbo V8 hybrid sports-racing car for the LMDh category starting 2023
9YA	2018	3rd generation of the Cayenne SUV
9YB	2019	Cayenne Coupe
