= Porsche 645 =

1950s German sports car

- Constructor: Porsche
- Designer: Heinrich Klie
- Production: 1956
- Predecessor: Porsche 550
- Successor: Porsche 718

Technical specifications
- Length: 3,775 mm (148.6 in)
- Width: 1,420 mm (55.9 in)
- Height: 900 mm (35.4 in)
- Axle track: 1,190 / 1,150 mm (46.9 / 45.3 in)
- Wheelbase: 2,000 mm (78.7 in)
- Engine: Type 547 1,498 cc (91.4 cu in)
- Weight: 550 kg (1,212.5 lb)

Competition history
- Unless otherwise stated, all data refer to Formula One World Championship Grands Prix only.

The Porsche 645 Spyder is a sports-racing car built by Porsche. Planned as a successor to the Porsche 550, the car was discontinued in favor of the revised 550A and the Porsche 718. The only example completed, nicknamed "Mickey Mouse", was destroyed in a crash.

== History ==
In late 1954 development started on a new car with the designation Type 645. The car shared many features with the earlier 550, which it was intended to succeed. The goal was to produce a car with less weight, better aerodynamics, and better grip than its predecessor. The project was initiated by Egon Forstner, the head of Porsche's calculations department. Forstner was joined by Ernst Fuhrmann, designer of the Type 547 engine that would power the car, and body designer Heinrich Klie. Klie produced a one-fifth scale model to experiment with several innovative aerodynamic features, including a headrest/air-intake and a rearward-facing slot in the rear deck, both of which Klie and Fuhrmann were granted patents for. The car would be narrower, lower, and shorter than the 550. It would also use a new chassis, and an advanced rear suspension.

Development was well along when, on 15 February 1955, Karl Rabe, Porsche's chief engineer, wrote a memo to company senior management asking for a review of the project. Work on the 645 was halted until 1956, when Porsche expected new competition in the sports-racer classes. Development restarted under work order number 9159, issued 16 February 1956, that authorized construction of two cars. On 28 February that year Forstner asked that work on the car be accelerated.

By mid-June one of the two cars was complete and had been tested at the Malmsheim Airfield skid pad. Driver Herbert Linge drove the car at Malmsheim and reported that the front suspension could not cope with the traction from the rear. He said that the car started with considerable understeer, but that when the rear broke loose it came around so quickly that it could not be caught.

== Features ==
=== Body and chassis ===
To reduce the car's frontal area from that of the 550 the front track was narrower by 100 mm (3.9 in) at 1,190 mm (46.9 in) and the rear by 140 mm (5.5 in) at 1,150 mm (45.3 in). At 2,000 mm (78.7 in), the car's wheelbase was also shorter than that of the 550. Klie's design wrapped the bodywork closely around the chassis.

To reduce drag, the air inlet for the oil cooler was eliminated. Instead, the entire surface of the front hatch panel was converted into a cooler, with a pattern of hollow passages soldered to its underside and through which oil was circulated, radiating heat out the unpainted surface of the panel. The body was made of magnesium, which is lighter but more fragile than aluminum. The right side of the car did not have a door, as a fuel tank was installed on that side of the cabin. The chassis was a space frame constructed of steel tube, a technology that would also appear in the second generation 550, the 550A/1500 RS. A bulge in the centre of the rear bodywork provided clearance for the mid-mounted engine's vertical fan. There were also two rear facing openings to feed air to the carburetors on each side, and a horizontal slot in the rear deck for cooling air. The concentration of masses in the centre of the car resulted in a low polar moment of inertia.

=== Suspension ===
The 645's front suspension used Porsche's traditional upper and lower transverse torsion bars and upper and lower trailing arms.

The rear suspension was significantly different than that of earlier Spyders. It consisted of familiar Porsche-style trailing arms and lateral torsion bars but added upper and lower lateral links. Both upper and lower links angled slightly backwards to attach to the hubs, and while the lower ones were parallel to the ground, the upper ones sloped downwards at a 13° angle towards the car's centre-line. The car's half-shafts had Hooke-style outer joints and pot-style inner joints that could accommodate changes in length.

=== Engine and transmission ===
The vehicle was powered by one of Fuhrmann's earlier projects, the Type 547 engine. This 1.5 litre air-cooled four-cylinder boxer engine had four camshafts; two per cylinder head. The exhaust camshafts were driven by layshafts that took power from a countershaft in the central crankcase below the crankshaft, while the intake camshafts were driven by vertical shafts from the exhaust camshafts, all of which was tied together by an assortment of sprockets and bevel gears. The engine also had two sparkplugs per cylinder, powered by a dual ignition with two ignition coils. Feeding fuel and air were two double-barrel Weber 40 DCM carburetors. In the 645 the engine produced 99 kW (132.8 hp) at 7200 rpm, and 145 N⋅m (106.9 ft⋅lb) at 5900 rpm.

The version of the 547 engine used in the 645 was an early model that drove its distributors from the ends of the camshafts. Newer 547s drove their distributors from the nose of the crankshaft, but that new arrangement took more space under the deck than the old; space that was not available in the 645's tight engine compartment. The car would be limited to using the older engines, giving up about 20 hp (15 kW) in the process.

== Technical data ==
Porsche 645 Spyder:	Data
Engine:	Flat, four-cylinder four-stroke boxer engine (Typ 547)
Bore × Stroke:	85.0 mm × 66.0 mm (3.3 in × 2.6 in)
Displacement:	1.5 L (1,498 cc; 91.4 cu in)
Maximum power:	99 kW (134.6 PS; 132.8 hp) at 7200 rpm
Maximum torque:	145 N⋅m (106.9 ft⋅lb) at 5900 rpm
Compression ratio:	
Valvetrain:	Lower countershaft, layshafts to exhaust camshafts, vertical shafts to intake camshafts. DOHC. 2 valves per cylinder.
Cooling:	Air-cooled (vertical fan)
Gearbox:	
Brakes:	
Front suspension:	Upper and lower transverse torsion bars, upper and lower trailing arms, tubular shock absorbers
Rear suspension:	Blade-style trailing arms and transverse torsion bars, angled upper and lower lateral links, tubular shock absorbers
Body/chassis:	Tubular steel spaceframe, magnesium bodywork
Track front/rear:	1,190 / 1,150 mm (46.9 / 45.3 in)
Wheelbase:	2,000 mm (78.7 in)
Wheels and tires f/r:	5.00–16 RS front / 5.25–16 RS; 5.50–16 rear
Length × Width × Height:	3,775 mm × 1,420 mm × 900 mm (148.6 in × 55.9 in × 35.4 in)
Weight:	550 kg (1,212.5 lb)
Top speed:	260 km/h (161.6 mph)

== Racing history ==
After the skidpad tests at Malmsheim, the completed car went to the Nürburgring for trials on 15 and 16 May 1956, and was at practice for the 1000 Kilometre race at the same track on 27 May. Drivers Hans Herrmann, Wolfgang von Trips and Richard von Frankenberg all rejected the 645 in favour of other cars. von Frankenberg nicknamed the car "Mickey Mouse" to describe the car's handling and braking rather than its diminutive size. Herrmann called the car "undriveable".

The 645's debut race was on 22 July 1956 at Solitude. The driver was von Frankenberg, who coped with losing first gear, brake problems, power loss, and excessive oil temperatures to finish in fourth place.

In August the 645 appeared at practice for the German Grand Prix, again at Nürburgring, but did not appear in the main race.

On 16 September 1956, at the Grand Prix of Berlin, von Frankenberg and the 645 were involved in what became known as the Miracle of the AVUS ring. von Frankenberg and the 645 were leading von Trips and his 550A on lap 3 of 30 when the 645 suddenly veered right, going up and over the lip at the top of the 43° banking on the North Curve. The car went airborne, dropping about 15 m (49 ft) down into the paddock, where the car and its magnesium bodywork caught fire. An unconscious von Frankenberg was found five minutes later, having been thrown free of the car. He spent five weeks in hospital due to injuries sustained when he was ejected from the car. He recovered and resumed racing. The auto club in charge of the race asked engineer Hermann Ramelow to examine the wreckage of the car. Ramelow found no evidence of mechanical failures in the car's steering or suspension components. Irrespective of his findings, the Type 645 was subsequently shelved. The car did show that better aerodynamics could produce performance gains. The nose of the 718 shows the influence of the earlier car.
