= Michael May (racing driver) =

Swiss racing driver (born 1934)

- Born: 18 August 1934 (age 92); Stuttgart, Württemberg, Germany

Formula One World Championship career
- Nationality: (Switzerland) Swiss
- Active years: 1961
- Team: non-works Lotus
- Entries: 3 (2 starts)
- Championships: 0
- Wins: 0
- Podiums: 0
- Career points: 0
- Pole positions: 0
- Fastest laps: 0
- First entry: 1961 Monaco Grand Prix
- Last entry: 1961 German Grand Prix

Michael^{[1]} May (born 18 August 1934) is a former racing driver and engineer from Switzerland. He participated in three Formula One World Championship Grands Prix, debuting on 14 May 1961. He scored no championship points. He was the winner of the 1959 Monaco Grand Prix Formula Junior.

== Racing career ==
May studied engineering. In 1956, he and his brother Pierre entered the 1956 1000km of Nürburgring in a modified Porsche 550 Spyder. The car was equipped with an adjustable elevated wing above the cockpit that generated downforce (or down thrust) for enhanced braking and cornering speeds to reduce lap times. During qualifying, the car lapped the circuit four seconds faster than the Porsche factory team 550s. Porsche racing director Huschke von Hanstein protested and May was not allowed to start the race with the wing.

In 1961, May made his debut in Formula One with Wolfgang Seidel's team Scuderia Colonia. Driving a Lotus 18, May qualified 13th for the Monaco Grand Prix but was forced to retire due to an oil leak. He finished his second race, the French Grand Prix, in eleventh place after starting from 22nd on the grid. He was also scheduled to take part in the German Grand Prix on the Nordschleife. May also took part in three non-valid races for the World Championship.

After a crash during practice for the 1961 German Grand Prix, May concentrated on engineering at Porsche, but entered the 1962 Pau Grand Prix without showing up.

== Engineering ==
In the early 1960s, May helped developing a fuel injection system for Porsche. He also worked on the aging flat-4-cylinder Porsche 547 engine, claiming it outperformed the new flat-8 Porsche 753 engine designed by Hans Mezger and thus the car was not sent to the 1962 Pau Grand Prix in which he wanted to show the improvement. May left Porsche.

Impressed with May's work, in 1963 Enzo Ferrari hired May to work on the fuel injection for the Ferrari 158. May also persuaded Ferrari to switch to magnesium rims for his racing cars.

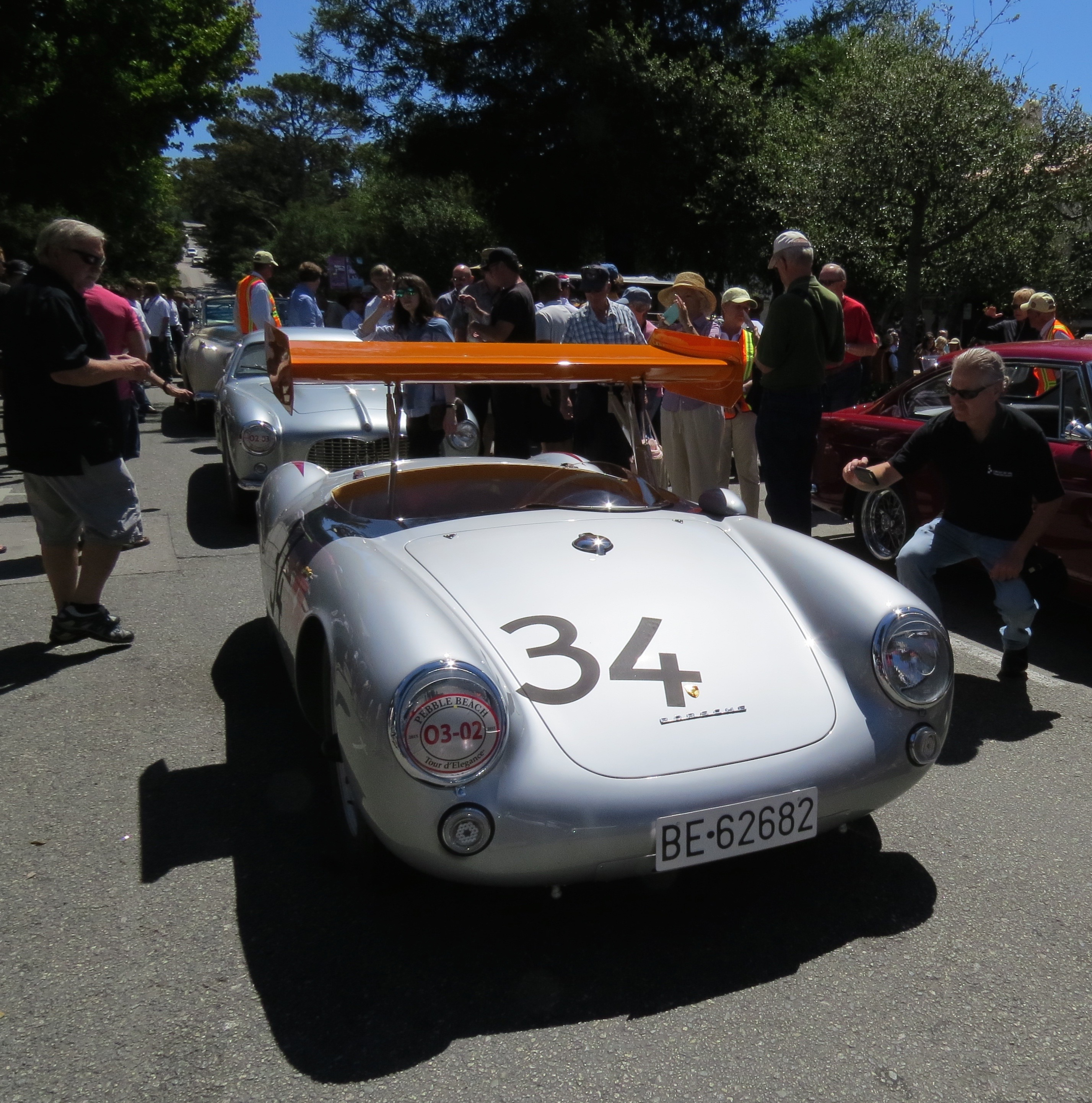
Porsche 550 with wing as modified by May for the 1956 Nürburgring 1000km

At the end of the 1960s, May developed a conversion kit with a turbocharger for Ford V6 engines. It increased the power from 108 hp (79 kW) to 188 hp (138 kW). At that time, there were only turbochargers for diesel engines, which could not withstand the high exhaust temperatures of gasoline engines. May led the exhaust gases from one cylinder bank through a long pipe around the engine, where they cooled down and mixed with the too hot exhaust gases from the other cylinder bank, reaching a temperature that the turbine could tolerate.

May also worked in designing high-compression engines, improving fuel economy among other things. The most notable example was his reworked 'Fireball' head for the 'high-efficiency' high-compression Jaguar V-12 HE engine.

== Complete Formula One World Championship results ==
(key)

Year	Entrant	Chassis	Engine	1	2	3	4	5	6	7	8	WDC	Points
1961	Scuderia Colonia	Lotus 18	Climax 1.5l straight-4	MON; Ret	NED	BEL	FRA; 11	GBR	GER; DNS	ITA; DNA	USA	NC	0

=== Non-Championship ===
(key)

Year	Entrant	Chassis	Engine	1	2	3	4	5	6	7	8	9	10	11	12	13	14	15	16	17	18	19	20	21
1961	Scuderia Colonia	Lotus 18	Climax Straight-4	LOM	GLV	PAU	BRX	VIE	AIN; Ret	SYR	NAP	LON	SIL; Ret	SOL; Ret	KAN	DAN	MOD	FLG	OUL; DNA	LEW	VAL	RAN	NAT	RSA
1962	Michael May	-	-	CAP	BRX	LOM	LAV	GLV	PAU; DNA	AIN	INT	NAP	MAL	CLP	RMS	SOL	KAN	MED	DAN	OUL	MEX	RAN	NAT	

== Notes ==
1. Sources disagree as to the spelling of May's first name. Forix and The Guinness Complete Grand Prix Who's Who say "Michael", whereas www.grandprix.com says "Michel" and this 8W article lists both.
