= Hans Mezger =

German automotive engineer (1929–2020)

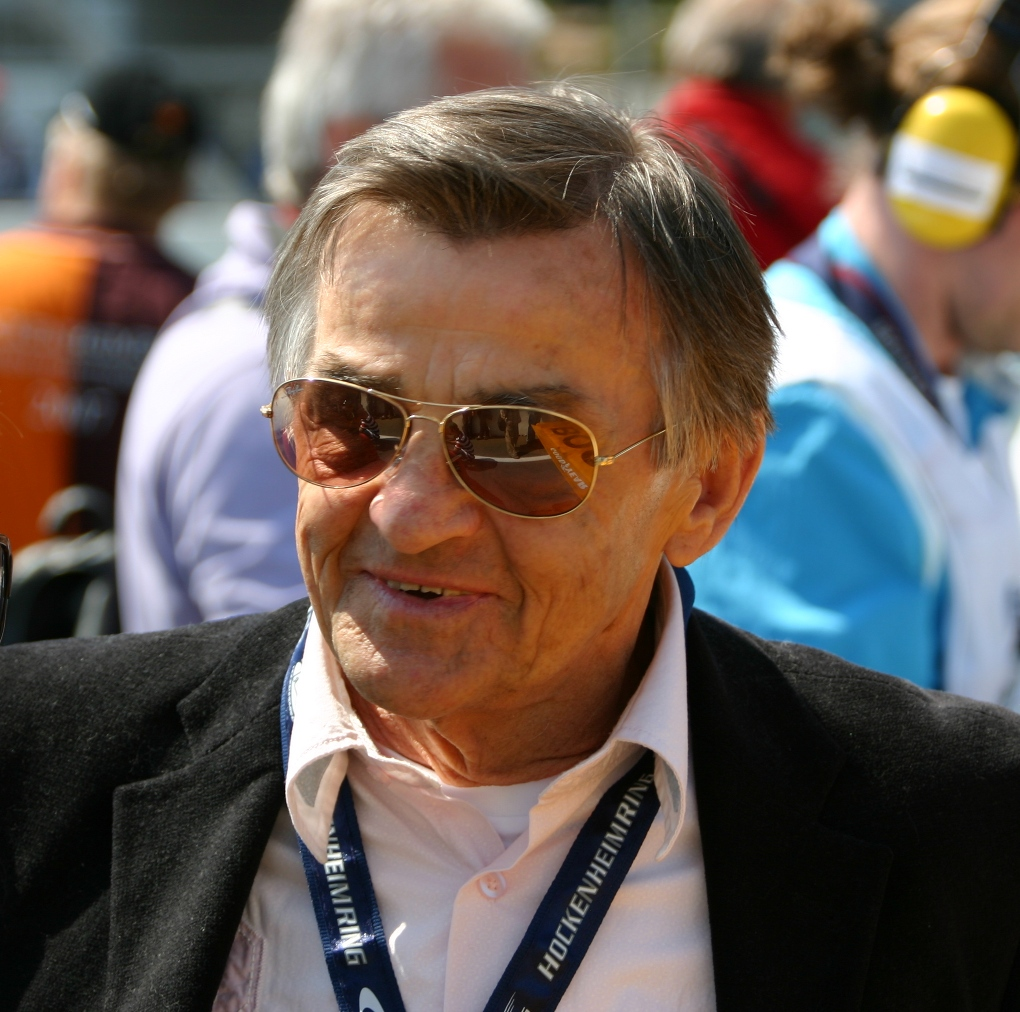
Hans Mezger at the Hockenheimring in 2009

Hans Mezger (18 November 1929 – 10 June 2020) was a German automotive engineer well known for his work at Porsche.

== Career ==
Mezger was born in Besigheim, in Württemberg, Germany. He graduated from the Stuttgart Technical University in 1956 with a Diploma of Engineering degree, and went straight to work at Porsche's Works 1 development department. His first project was to work on the valve train of the Fuhrmann-designed Porsche 547 engine Carrera engine. In 1959 he moved to the design department to work on the type 753 flat-eight engine for the Porsche 804 Formula 1 car.

Over the next 35 years he took part in the 1960s and 1980s F1 programmes, undertook design leadership for the first Porsche 911 production Type 901 engine and led the famed 1960s Race Design office that turned out the Porsche 904, 906, 910, 907, 908 and 917s. Mezger led Porsche's development of turbocharging with the 1,600 hp (1,180 kW) 917/30 and its application to the 911 Turbo, as well as the Porsche 935 and Porsche 936 that won Le Mans several times from 1976 to 1981.

In 1980, Porsche wanted to enter the Indy 500, but the partially water-cooled 2.65-litre flat-6 "Mezger engine" that had been developed from the 935 engines was limited to the same turbo boost as the high-revving Ford-Cosworth Indy V8 engine, thus Porsche used it "only" to win the 1981 24h Le Mans and then in the Porsche 956 and 962 Group C and IMSA race cars, for more Le Mans wins.

Mezger was also responsible for the Porsche-made TAG TAG TTE PO1 V6 F1 Turbo engine from the mid-1980s, which won multiple championships in Formula One in the McLaren MP4/2 chassis. The Porsche 3512 V12 for the Footwork FA12 was no success, though.

Mezger retired in 1994. By the mid 1990s, Porsche still sold air-cooled flat-6 in the Porsche 993, but the "Mezger engine" was used to turbo-power the Porsche 911 GT1 for the 1998 24h Le Mans win, and from 1999 onwards, in naturally aspirated form in GT3 resp. turbo charged in GT2 versions of the Porsche 996 and later generations of the 911 with water cooled engines. The basic low cost wet-sump flat-6 engines in the regular 996s were not suited well for racing, that's why Porsche brought back the race-proven Dry sump design of Mezger.

Hans Mezger died on June 10, 2020, at the age of 90.
