= 335 (disambiguation) =

335 may refer to:

- 335 (year)
- 335 (number)
- 335 BC
- BMW 335
- 335 Roberta
- Porsche 335
- Cessna 335
