= Porsche 335 =

Porsche type 335 is a belt driven winch intended for agricultural use in post-war Austria.

== History ==
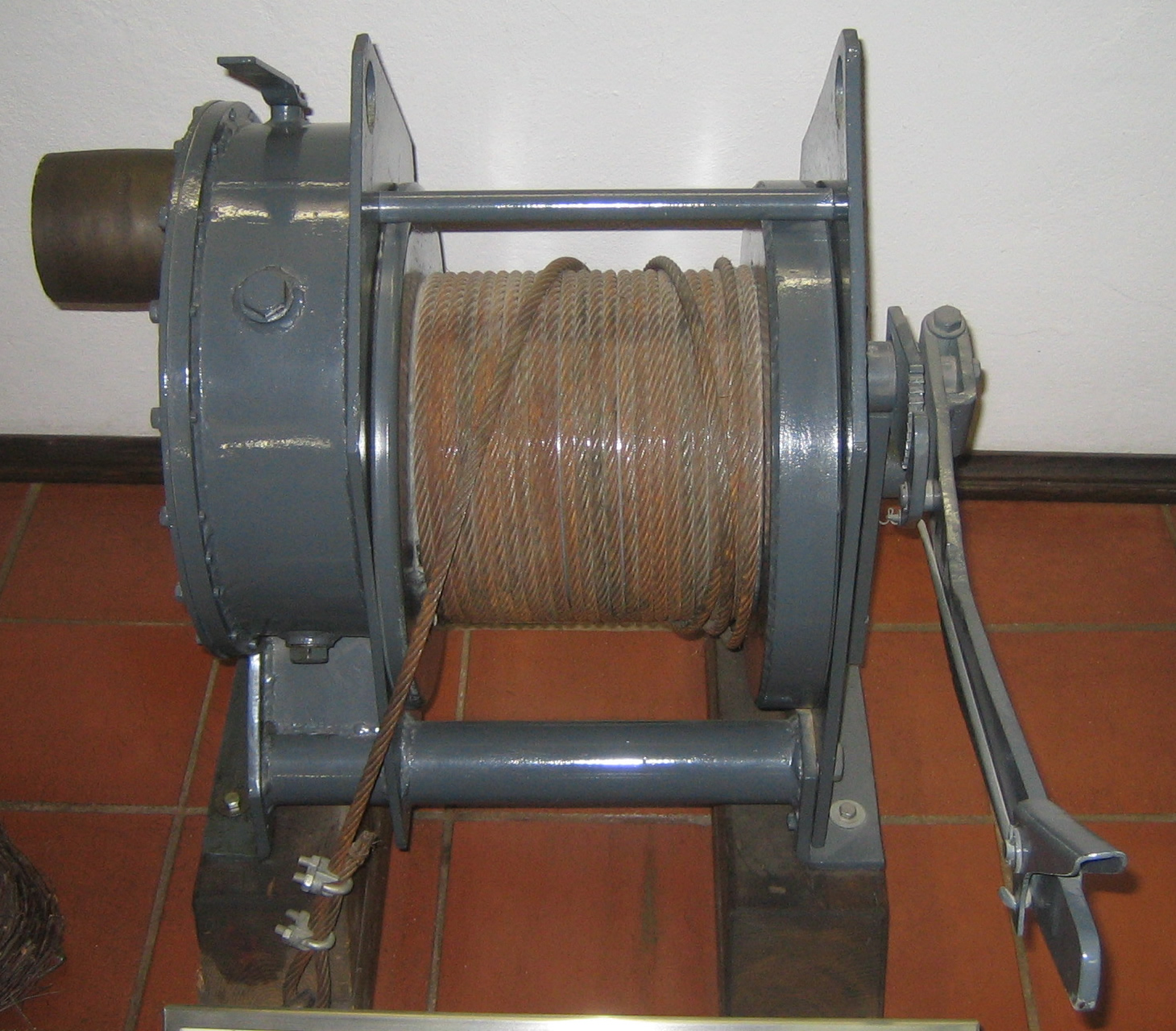
Porsche type 335 Winch

At the end of World War II the Porsche company Porsche Konstruktionen Ges. m.b.H was located in Gmünd, Carinthia in Austria. The company survived by repairing passenger cars, trucks and agricultural machinery. Next to this they took on commissions for various machinery used in the local area such as wind turbines, engines for ski lifts and winches. The type 335 winch design was particularly useful as surface winch for farmers in mountainous areas. A handcart was designed for the winch under Porsche type number 337.

== Specifications ==
According to the type plate of several type 335 winches in museum collections The winch requires a 4PS belt drive with around 700rpm and incorporates 2 gears resulting in a cable speed of 0.75 m/s and 1.5 m/s at a specified traction of 335 kg in first gear and 175 kg in second.. The winch can take a maximum cable length of 700m (4.8mm cross section) and weighs 140 kg without and 210 kg with cable.
