= Porsche 550 =

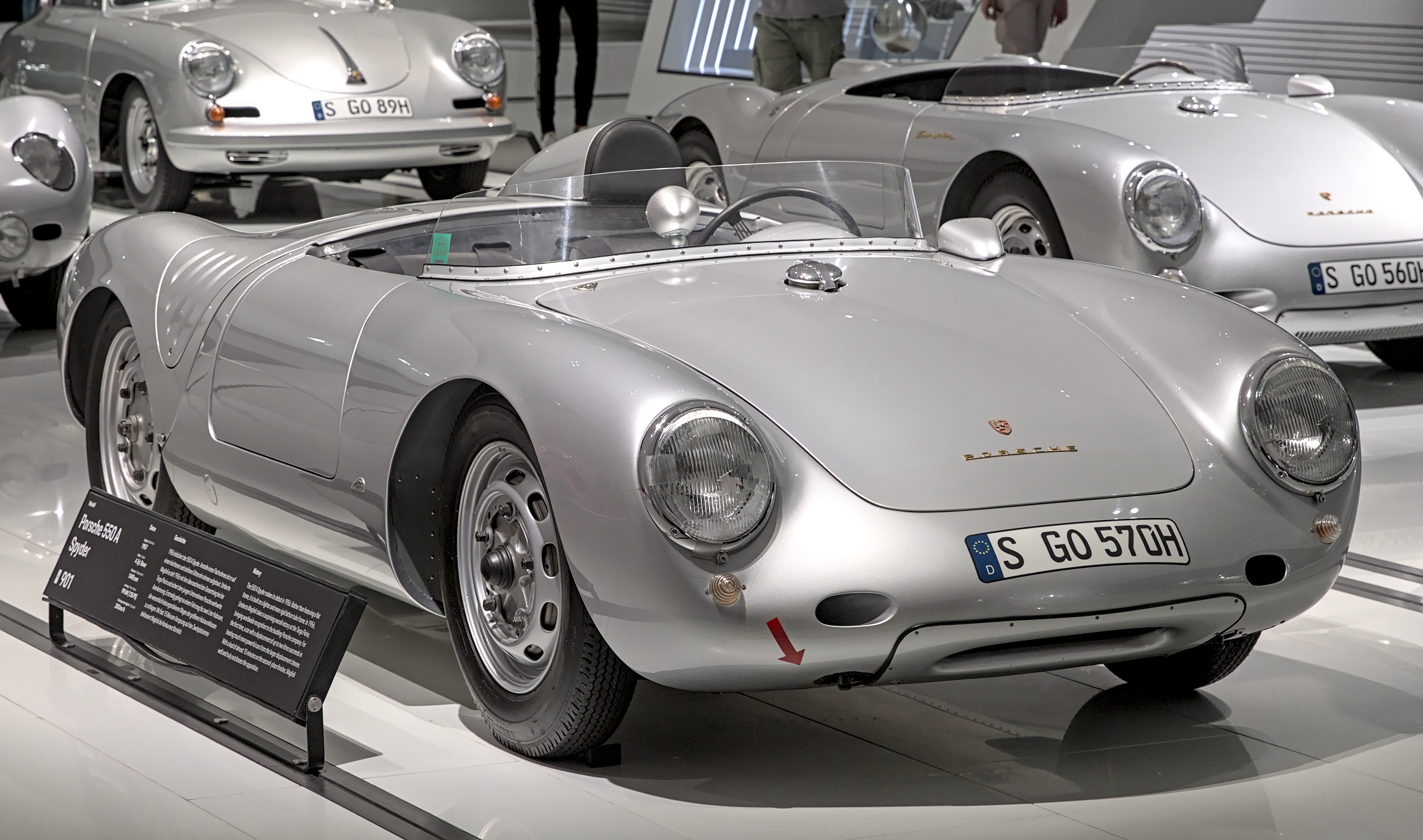

Overview
- Manufacturer: Porsche
- Production: 1953–1956; 90 produced
- Assembly: Germany: Stuttgart
- Designer: Erwin Komenda

Body and chassis
- Class: Sports car
- Body style: 2-door coupé 2-door spyder
- Layout: RMR layout

Powertrain
- Engine: 1.5L (1,498 cc) DOHC flat four engine
- Transmission: 4-speed manual 5-speed manual

Dimensions
- Wheelbase: 2,100 mm (82.7 in)
- Length: 3,600 mm (141.7 in)
- Width: 1,610 mm (63.4 in)
- Height: 980 mm (38.6 in)
- Curb weight: approximately 550 kg (1,213 lb)

Chronology
- Successor: Porsche 718

The Porsche 550 is a racing sports car produced by Porsche from 1953 until 1956. In that time only 90 Porsche 550s were produced, and they quickly established dominance in the 1.1- and 1.5- liter classes. The Porsche 550 is a mid-engine car with an air-cooled four-cylinder engine, following the precedent of the 1948 Porsche 356/1 prototype designed by Ferry Porsche. The mid-engine racing design was further developed with Porsche's 718 model; Its advantages led to it becoming the dominant design for top-level racing cars by the mid-1960s.

The Porsche 550 has a solid racing history; it won the Nürburgring Eifel Race in May 1953, the first race it entered. The 550 Spyder usually finished in the top three in its class. Each Spyder was designed and customized to be raced.

A 1958 Porsche 550A Spyder sold at auction in 2018 by Bonhams for $5,170,000 (£4,115,763); it was the highest price for a 550 at auction.

== Engine and transmission ==
The Type 550/550 A is powered by the Porsche 547 engine, or "Fuhrmann Engine" after Dr. Ernst Fuhrmann, an all aluminium naturally aspirated air-cooled 4 cylinder boxer engine. In the 550s, most 547s had bore × stroke measurements of 85 mm × 66 mm (3.35 in × 2.60 in), and a total displacement of 1.5 L (1,498 cc; 91.4 cu in).

The 547's valvetrain uses double overhead camshafts on each cylinder bank, driven by vertical shafts, actuating 2 valves per cylinder. The engine is equipped with twin 2-barrel Solex 40 PII carburetors and dual ignition. In its first version it produced 110 PS (108 hp; 81 kW) at 6200 rpm and a maximum torque of 121 N⋅m (89 lb⋅ft) at 5000 rpm.

The engine of the 550 is mounted in front of the rear axle in a rear mid-engine, rear-wheel-drive layout. This gives it a balanced weight distribution, and allows for largely neutral handling. On the other hand, the low moment of inertia about the vehicle's vertical axis can lead to a sudden, difficult to control rotation of the car. Ferdinand Porsche had pioneered this design layout with the Auto Union Grand Prix car of the 1930s.

The first 550 had a fully synchronized 4-speed gearbox. Starting in 1956, a 5-speed gearbox was used, but first gear was only for starts and, like reverse gear, was not synchronized. Excessive slip to the drive wheels in corners was prevented by a limited-slip differential.

== History ==
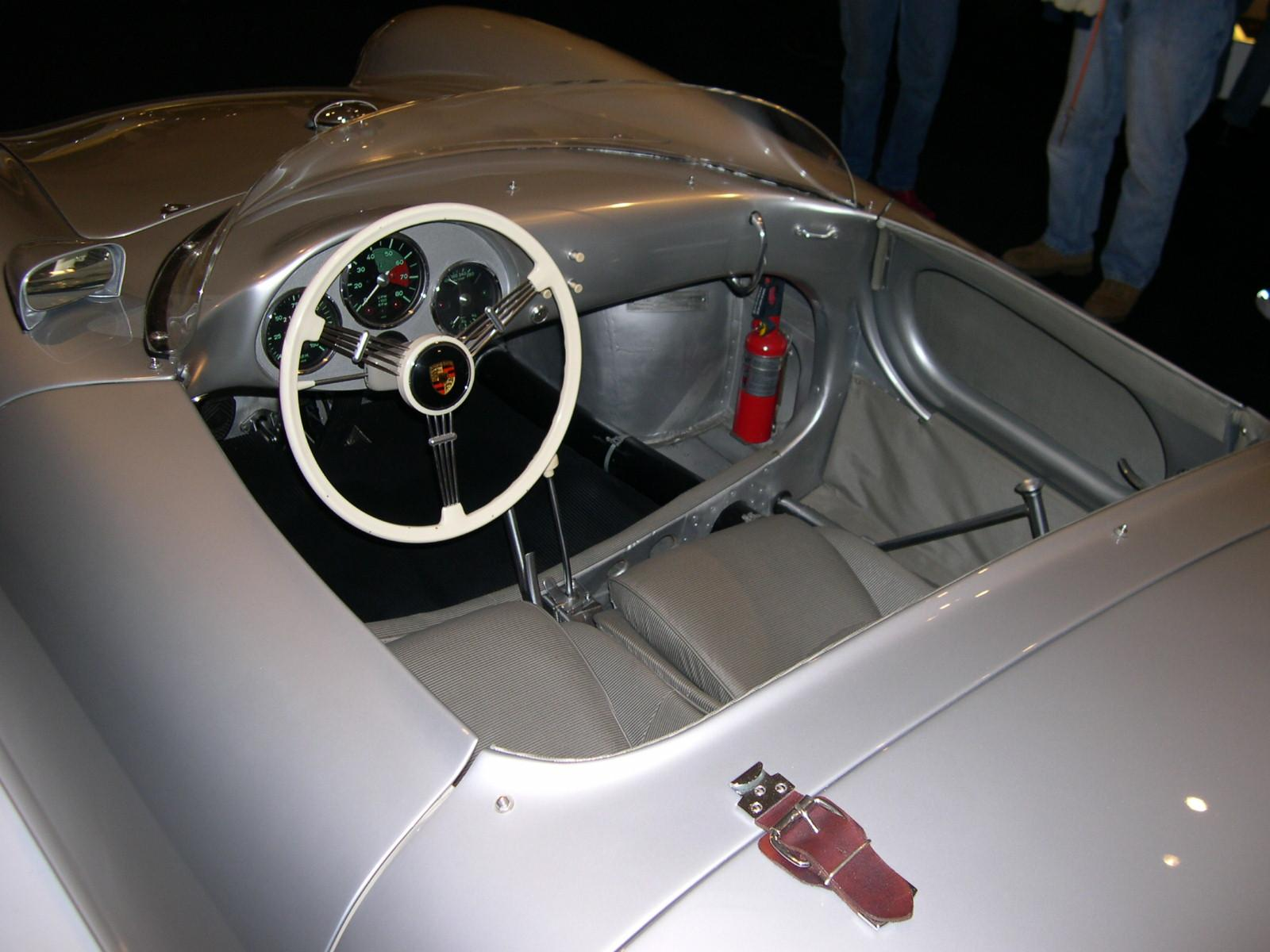
Spartan interior of a 1955 550 RS from the Ralph Lauren car collection

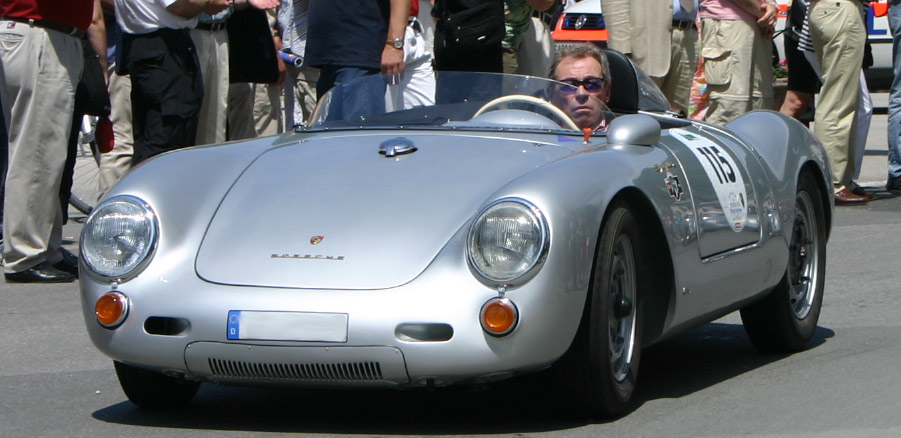
Porsche 550 RS with amber European spec blinkers

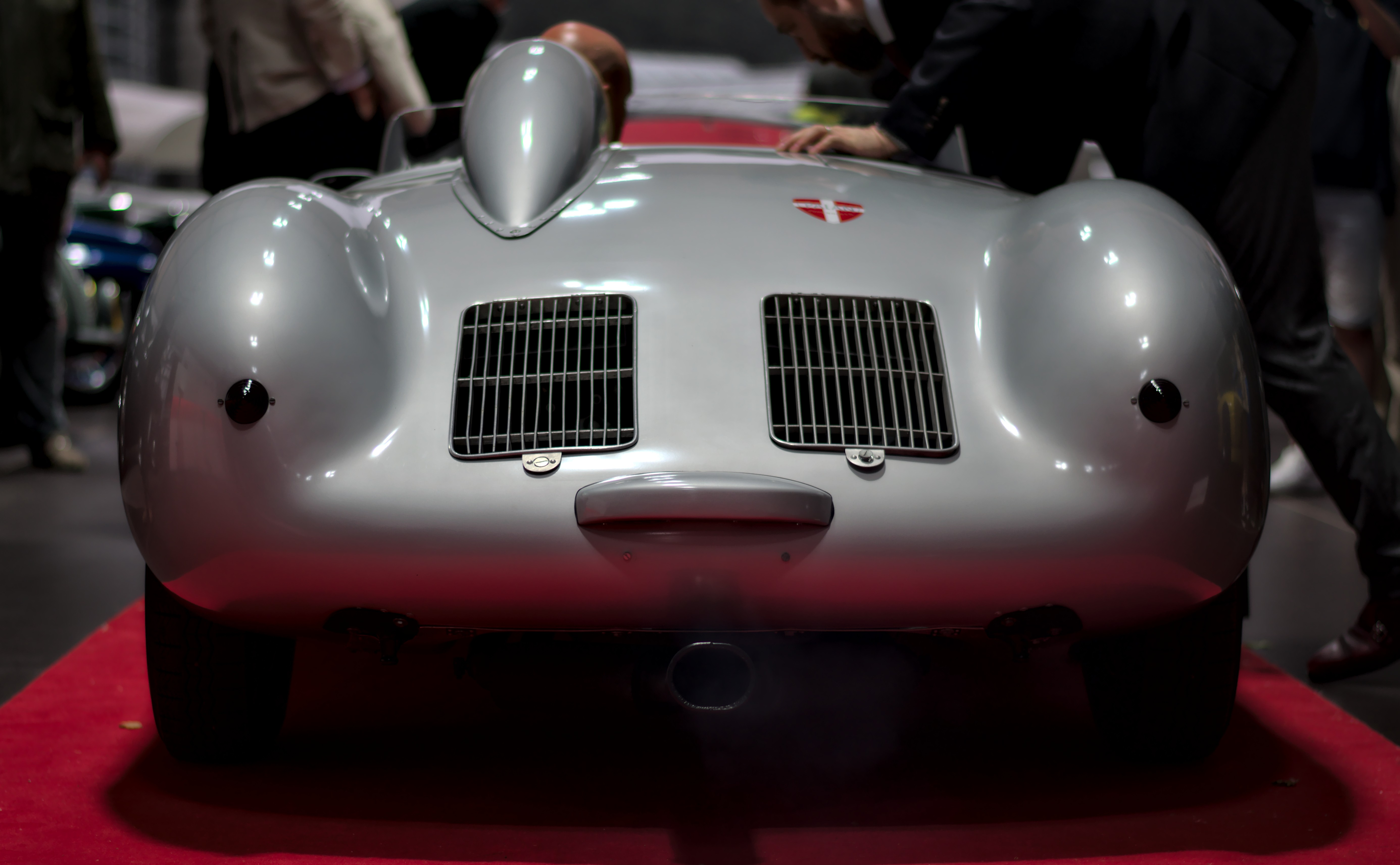
Backside of a running 1957 Porsche 550A

Inspired by the original "No.1" mid-engined Porsche 356/1 which was created by Ferry Porsche, as well as Spyder prototypes built and raced by Walter Glöckler starting in 1951, the factory decided to build a mid-engined car designed for use in auto racing. The Porsche 550 Spyder was introduced at the 1953 Paris Auto Show. The 550 was very low to the ground, in order to be efficient for racing. In fact, during the 1954 Mille Miglia, German Formula One racer Hans Herrmann drove it under closed railroad crossing gates.

=== Racing history ===
The first three hand-built prototypes came in a coupé with a removable hardtop. The first (550-03) raced as a roadster at the Nurburgring Eifel Race in May 1953 winning its first race. Later that year the 550 took class wins in the 24 Hours of Le Mans and the Carrera Panamericana; the Carrera Panamericana win was commemorated with the Carrera branding for later Porsches with performance options. From 1953 to 1957, the Porsche works team evolved and raced the 550 with outstanding success and was recognized wherever it appeared. The silver Werks cars were painted with spears of different colors on the rear fenders to aid recognition from the pits. Hans Herrmann’s particularly famous ‘red-tail’ car No 41 went from victory to victory. For such a limited number of 90 prototype and customer builds, the 550 Spyder was always in a winning position, usually finishing in the top three results in its class. During its tenure with the works team it was challenged only twice among the smaller cars at the 1954 24 Hours of Le Mans, with a 1.5-liter OSCA MT4 finishing ahead but disqualified in the 1954 race and a 1.1 liter Lotus Eleven trailing the 1.5 liter winning 550 by one lap in the 1957 race. The 1956 version, the 550A with a lighter and more rigid spaceframe chassis, gave Porsche its first overall win in a major sports car racing event, the 1956 Targa Florio, not a part of the World Championship that year, though. During this era Porsche was the first European car manufacturer to get race sponsorship for North American events, which was through Fletcher Aviation, who Porsche was working with to design a light aircraft engine, and later Telefunken and Castrol.

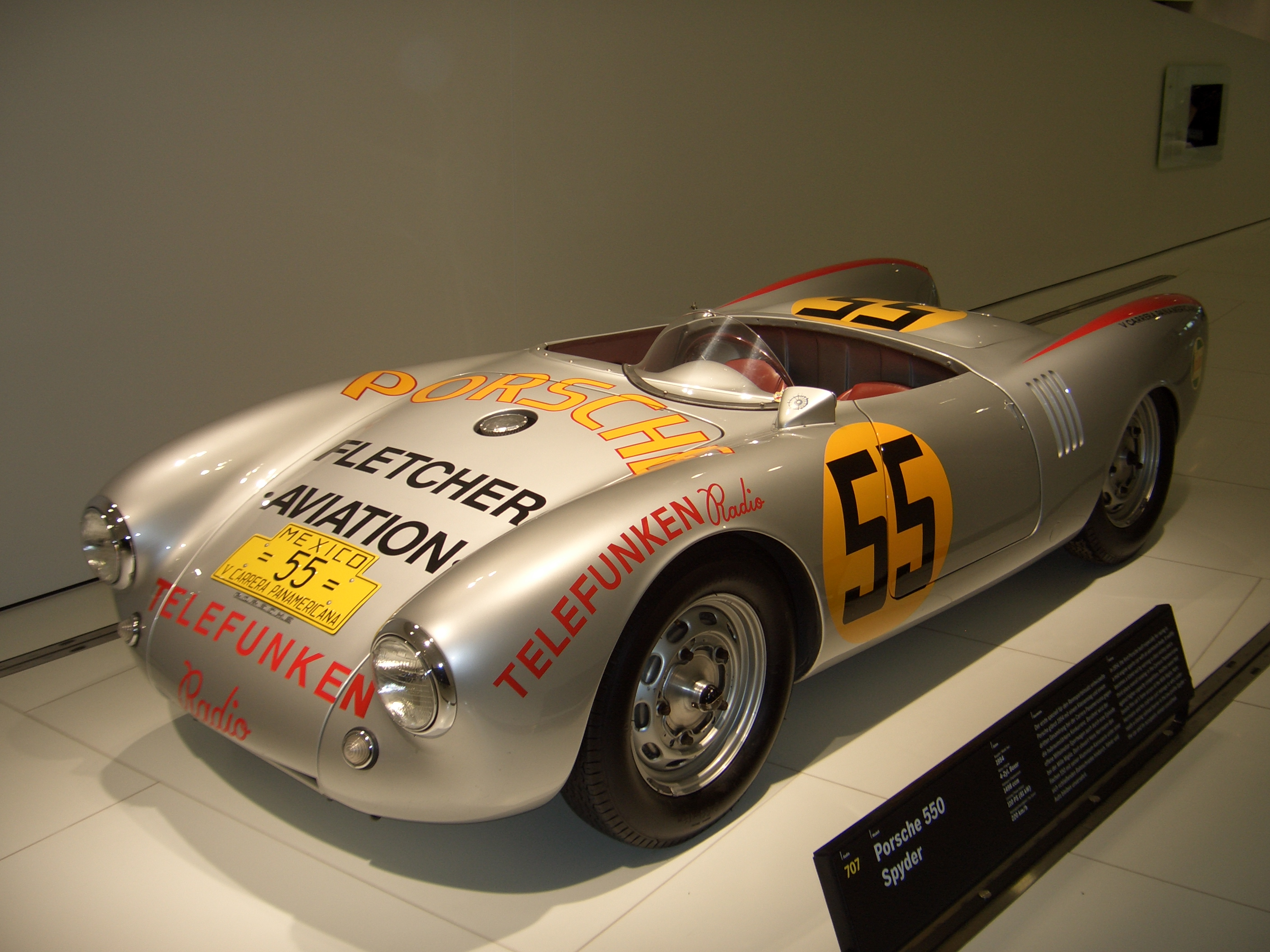
The Porsche 550 of the German Hans Herrmann first place in the Sport category of less than 1500 c.c. in 1954 Carrera Panamericana.

The 550 was also raced by privateers, who kept the type in competition after the works team had moved on to the 718 in 1957. The 550 was both a road and track car and it was common for privateers to drive it to the race track, race it, then drive it home. One 550 was purchased by Yugoslav leader Josip Broz Tito for Milivoje Božić, with which he finished third in the 1000-km Supercortemaggiore Grand Prix at Monza Circuit with only one set of tyres in 1958 before winning his class in the 1960 European Hill Climb Championship; the car was sold to Prada in 1961.

Each Spyder was assigned a number for the race and had gumballs positioned on doors, front and rear, to be seen from any angle. On some 550s owned by privateers, a crude hand written number scrawled in house paint usually served the purpose. Cars with high numbers assigned such as 351, raced in the 1000 mile Mille Miglia, where the number represented the start time of 3.51am. On most occasions, numbers on each Spyder would change for each race entered, which today helps identify each 550 by chassis number and driver in period black and white photos.

Its successor from 1957 onwards, the Porsche 718, commonly known as the RSK was even more successful. The Spyder variations continued through the early 1960s, the RS 60 and RS 61.

The Porsche Boxster S 550 Spyder is a modern mid-engined sports car that pays tribute to the 550; the Spyder name was effectively resurrected with the RS Spyder Le Mans Prototype.

=== James Dean's 550 ===
One of the first 90 Porsche 550s built was James Dean's, numbered 130 (VIN 550-0055), which was involved in a collision at the CA Rte. 46/41 Cholame Junction on September 30, 1955, resulting in Dean's death.

As Dean was finishing up Giant's filming in September 1955, he suddenly traded in his 356 Porsche Super Speedster at Competition Motors, for a new 1955 Porsche 550 Spyder on September 21, and immediately entered the upcoming Salinas Road Race event scheduled for October 1 and 2.

A contemporary of Dean, the rising actor Tom Pittman also died prematurely when he crashed his Spyder over a cliff in 1958.

==== Replicas ====
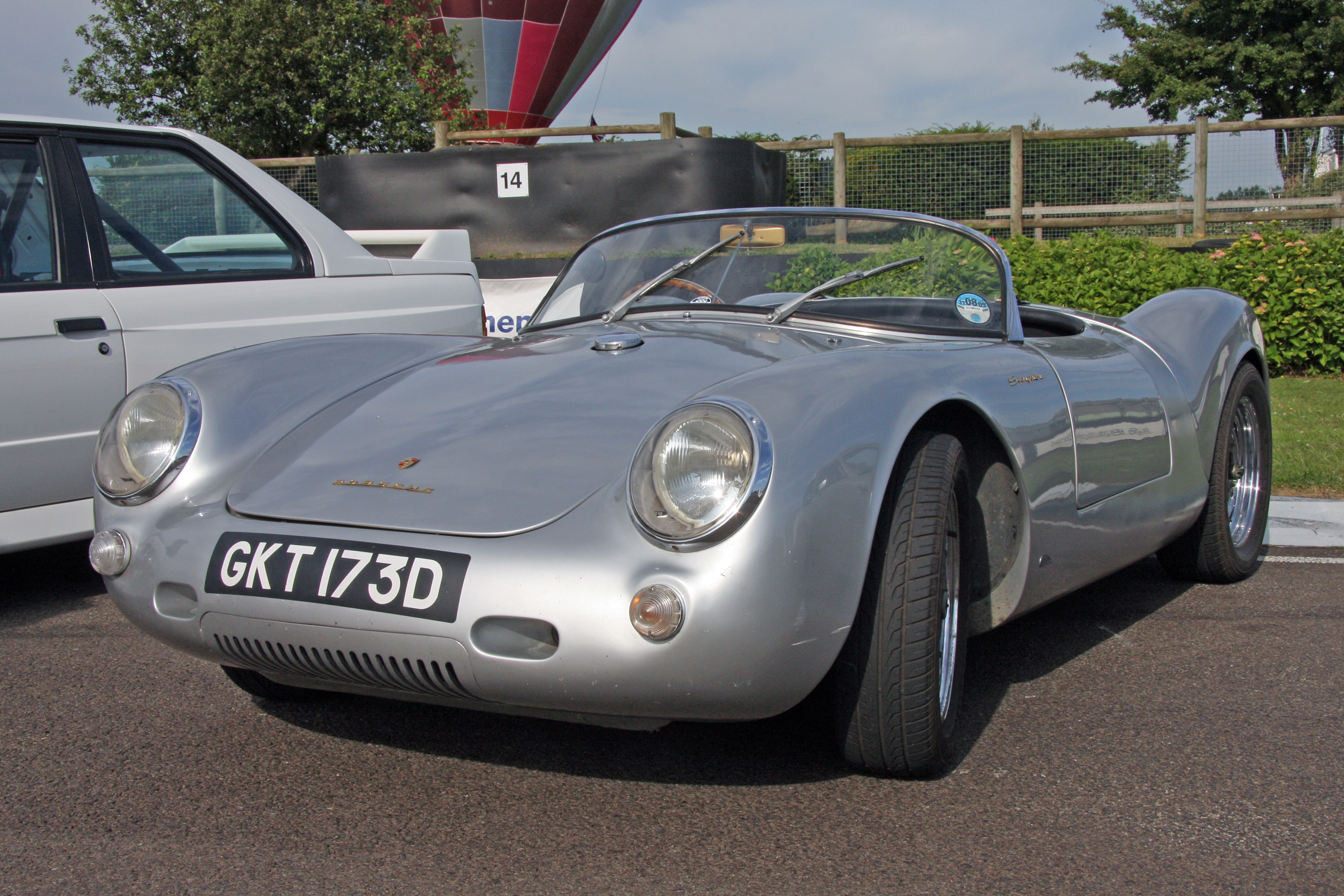
Replica 550 Spyder, fibreglass panels on custom chassis, powered by VW, Porsche or Alfa Romeo flat-4 engine

The 550 is among the most frequently reproduced classic automobiles.

== Complete Formula One World Championship results ==
Year	Entrant	Chassis	Engine	Tyres	Drivers	1	2	3	4	5	6	7	8	9	10	11	Points	WCC
1957	Dr Ing F. Porsche KG	RS550	Porsche F4	?		ARG	MON	500	FRA	GBR	GER	PES	ITA				N/A	N/A
1957	Dr Ing F. Porsche KG	RS550	Porsche F4	?	(Germany) Edgar Barth						12*						N/A	N/A
1957	Dr Ing F. Porsche KG	RS550	Porsche F4	?	(Italy) Umberto Maglioli						Ret*						N/A	N/A
1957	Ecurie Maarsbergen	RS550	Porsche F4	D	(Netherlands) Carel Godin de Beaufort						Ret*						N/A	N/A
1958	Ecurie Maarsbergen	RS550	Porsche F4	D		ARG	MON	NED	500	BEL	FRA	GBR	GER	POR	ITA	MOR	N/A	N/A
1958	Ecurie Maarsbergen	RS550	Porsche F4	D	(Netherlands) Carel Godin de Beaufort								Ret*				N/A	N/A

* Indicates a Formula Two entry
