= Porsche 547 engine =

Racing engine

The Porsche 547 engine, often called Fuhrmann engine after Ernst Fuhrmann, was introduced in 1954 by Porsche to upgrade the mid-rear-engine Porsche 550 sportscar. Still based on the Volkswagen design, thus an air-cooled naturally-aspirated flat-four boxer engine, it was intended for racing and fitted with no less than four camshafts (DOHC).

Fitted with the new engine that initially developed 110 hp from 1500cc, the Porsche 550 soon received a new frame and was called 550A. The 4-cam engine was also used in the successor Porsche 718 that was even turned into Formula 2 and 1 cars. After the 1962 Formula One season, Porsche left F1 to re-focus on road-going sportscars, offering the Porsche 904 Carrera GTS with the final edition of the Fuhrmann engine, some 180 hp from 2000cc.

By the time, there were also the flat-8 Type 771 Porsche flat-eight engines and the new Porsche flat-six engine Type 901 as introduced in the Porsche 911 (classic). The F6 design was chosen for the 1966 series of Porsche 906 Carrera 6, making the F4 obsolete.

== Formula Racing History ==
The Porsche 547/3 was used by Porsche for Formula One racing; between 1960 and 1961

In October 1958, the Fédération Internationale de l'Automobile (FIA) announced that for the 1961 Formula One season, engine capacity would be limited to the same 1.5 litres as in Formula Two (F2). This meant that Porsche could use their Porsche 718-based central steering and open wheel F2 cars almost unchanged in future F1. The Porsche 787 would not get the eight-cylinder though, continuing with the air-cooled, DOHC four-cylinder Type 547 boxer engine that had been developed by Ernst Fuhrmann and that had powered the 550 Spyders and Porsche 718 series until then. It was powered by a 547/3 four-cylinder engine with Kugelfischer fuel injection. At Monaco the car retired when the fuel injection cut out. A second car, also fitted with the 547/3 engine, was completed in time to appear in the 1961 Dutch Grand Prix on 22 May alongside the other 787.

== Technical data ==
Porsche 787:	Detail
Engine:	Flat four-cylinder four-stroke boxer Type 547/3
Displacement:	1,498 cc (91.4 cu in)
Bore × Stroke:	85.0 mm × 66.0 mm (3.3 in × 2.6 in)
Maximum power:	139 kW (189.0 PS; 186.4 hp) at 8000 rpm
Maximum torque:	147 N⋅m (108.4 ft⋅lb) at 6500 rpm
Compression ratio:	9.5:1-10.3:1
Valvetrain:	One bevel-gear driveshaft and two overhead camshafts per cylinder bank (four in total). Two valves per cylinder.
Cooling:	Air-cooled (fan)

== Gallery ==
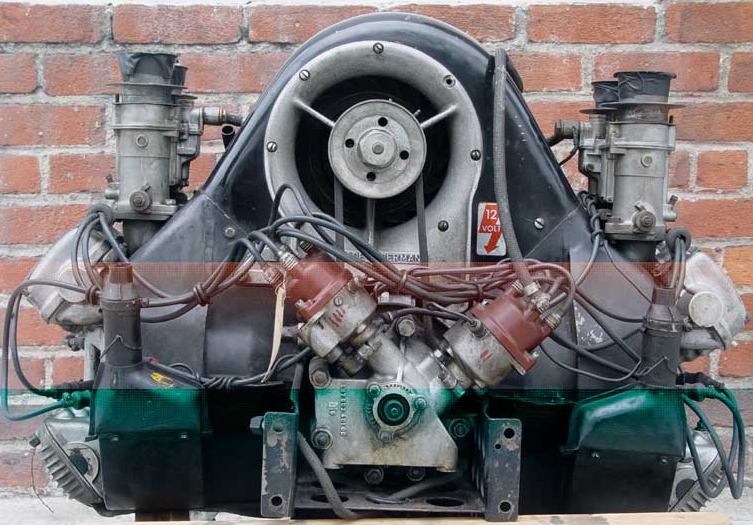
Type 547 Fuhrmann engine

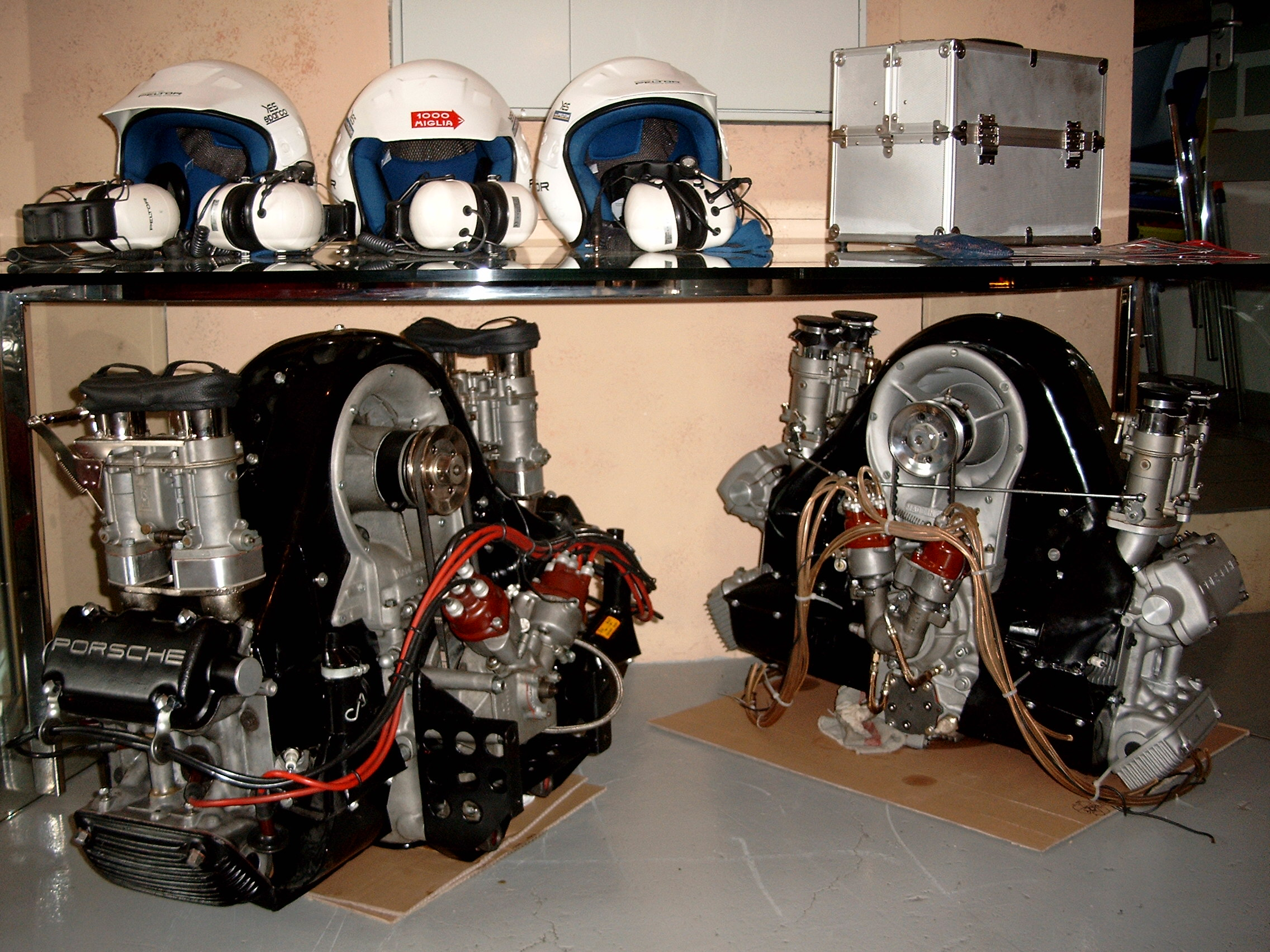
Porsche Type 547 Fuhrmann engines]

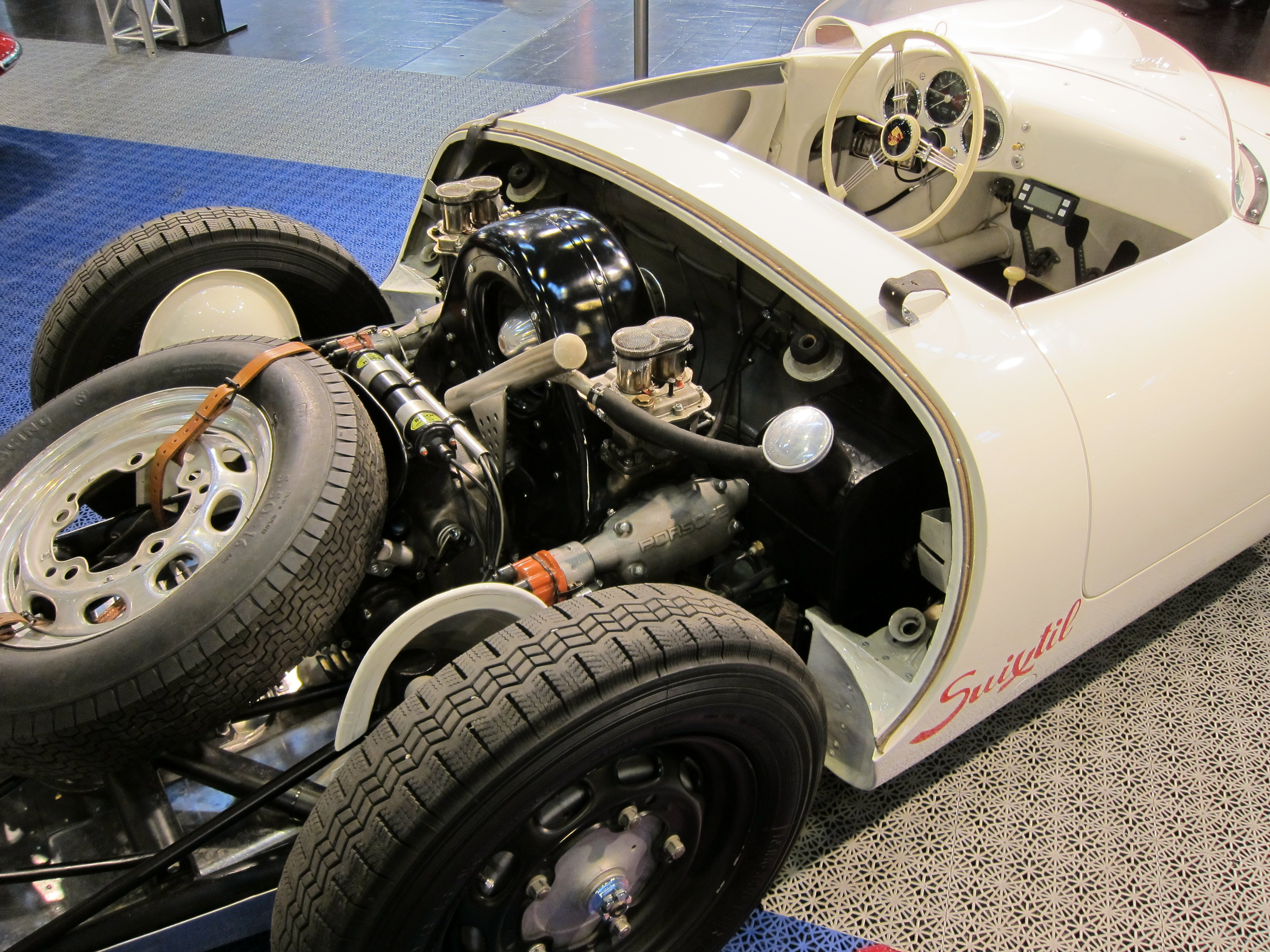
Fuhrmann engine in a Porsche 550

== Applications ==
- Porsche 718
- Porsche 787
