= Ernst Fuhrmann =

German businessman

- Born: 21 October 1918; Vienna, Austria-Hungary
- Died: 6 February 1995 (aged 76); Teufenbach, Austria
- Occupation: Mechanical Engineer

Dr. Ernst Fuhrmann (21 October 1918 – 6 February 1995) was chairman of Porsche AG between 1972 and 1980. During his first time in Zuffenhausen, in the mid 1950s, he was in charge of developing the Porsche Type 547 racing engine, which became known as the "Fuhrmann engine".

Fuhrmann born in the last days of Austria-Hungary, but died as a German citizen. Fuhrmann attended primary school and secondary school in Vienna. Between 1936 and 1941 he attended Vienna technical university TU Wien. During the war he undertook his military service, and from 1943 worked at AEG in Berlin, researching ultrasound and infrared devices. By 1947 he was working for Porsche, initially at the facility in Gmünd, Austria, later moving to Stuttgart. In 1950 he married his wife Elfriede. That same year he received his Doctorate of Mechanical Engineering from Prof. Richter at TU Wien for his study of valvetrains in high-speed internal combustion engines.

In 1952/53 he provided significant input to the development of the Porsche Type 547 engine, which became known as the "Fuhrmann engine". It was first used in the Porsche 550. This air-cooled four-cylinder boxer engine has two overhead camshafts on each of the Volkswagen Beetle-style two cylinder banks, driven by bevel gears on horizontal shafts in the same concept as the pre-war Wolseley OHC valvetrain (which had a racing success in MG K3), and had a built-up Hirth-type crankshaft on roller bearings instead of a typical one-piece crankshaft on split bearing metal.

In 1956 Fuhrmann left Porsche and took over responsibility for development with the car parts company Goetze. In 1962 he was appointed to the board of directors.

Fuhrmann returned to Porsche in 1971 as technical director. From 1972 to 1980 he served as chairman of the board at Porsche, which by then had become a joint-stock (German "Aktiengesellschaft" - (AG)) company. In 1977 he was granted an honorary professorship by the Vienna University of Technology. In the 1970s, the Porsche 911, then a nearly decade old design, was supposed to be replaced by front engined water cooled Porsche 924 and Porsche 928. Fuhrmann supported the development of 911 variants like the Carrera RS, the 930 Turbo and the Porsche 935, but planned to discontinue the 911 range in the 1980s.

In 1980 Porsche suffered its first money-losing year in history, much of the problem due to falling sales in the U.S. and lackluster takeup of their new designs, 924 and 928. Porsche removed long-time CEO Ernst Fuhrmann and started looking for a replacement. He was succeeded at Porsche in 1981 by German-American Peter W. Schutz who saved the 911.

== Gallery ==
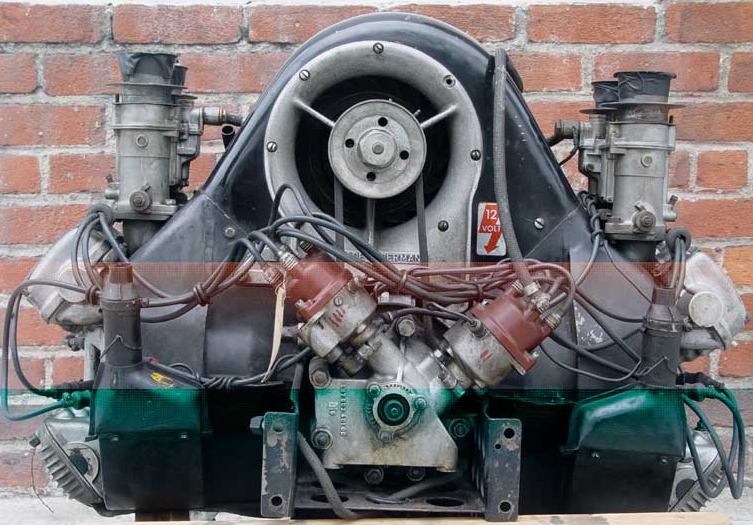
Type 547 Fuhrmann engine

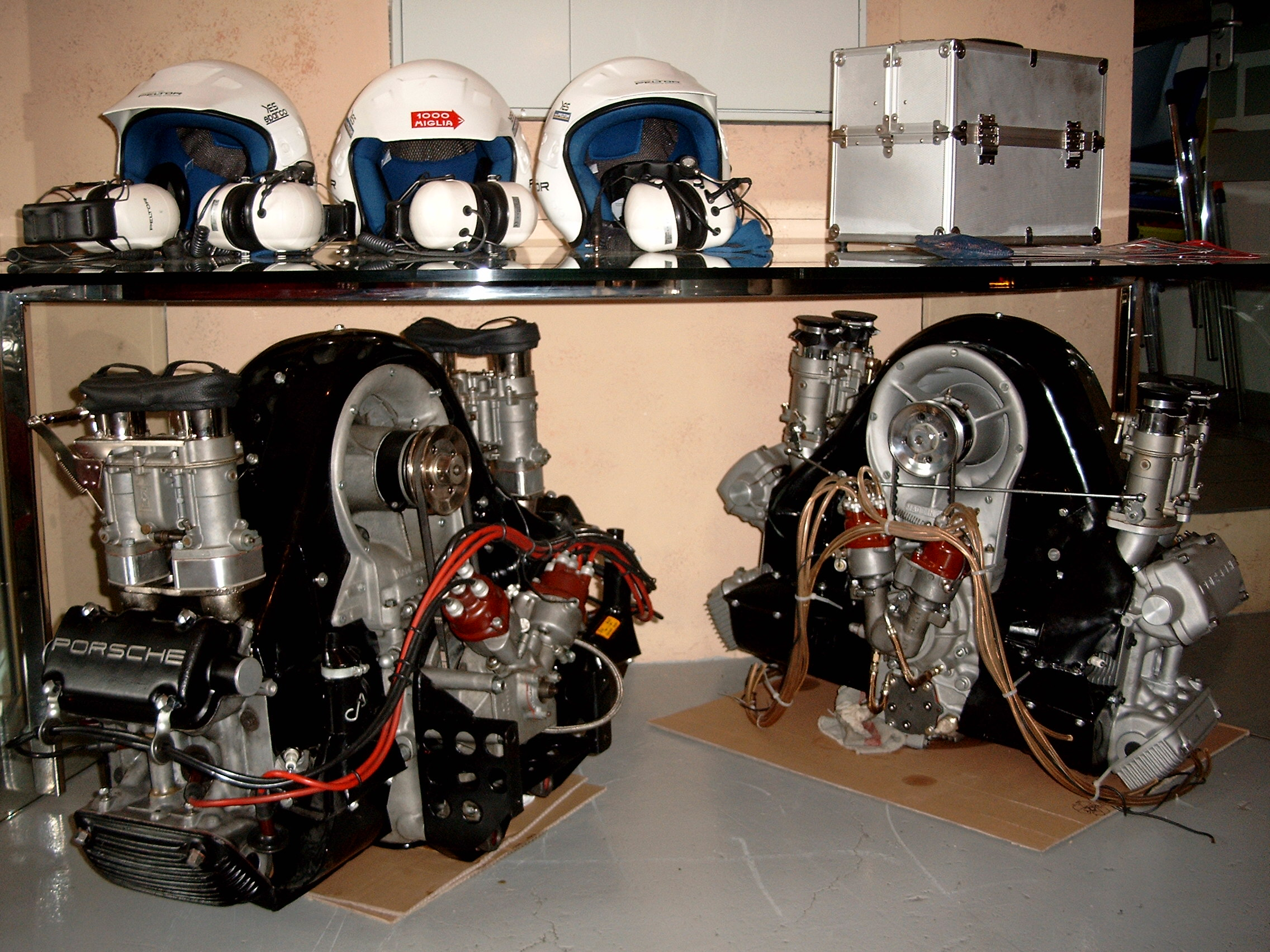
Porsche Type 547 Fuhrmann engines

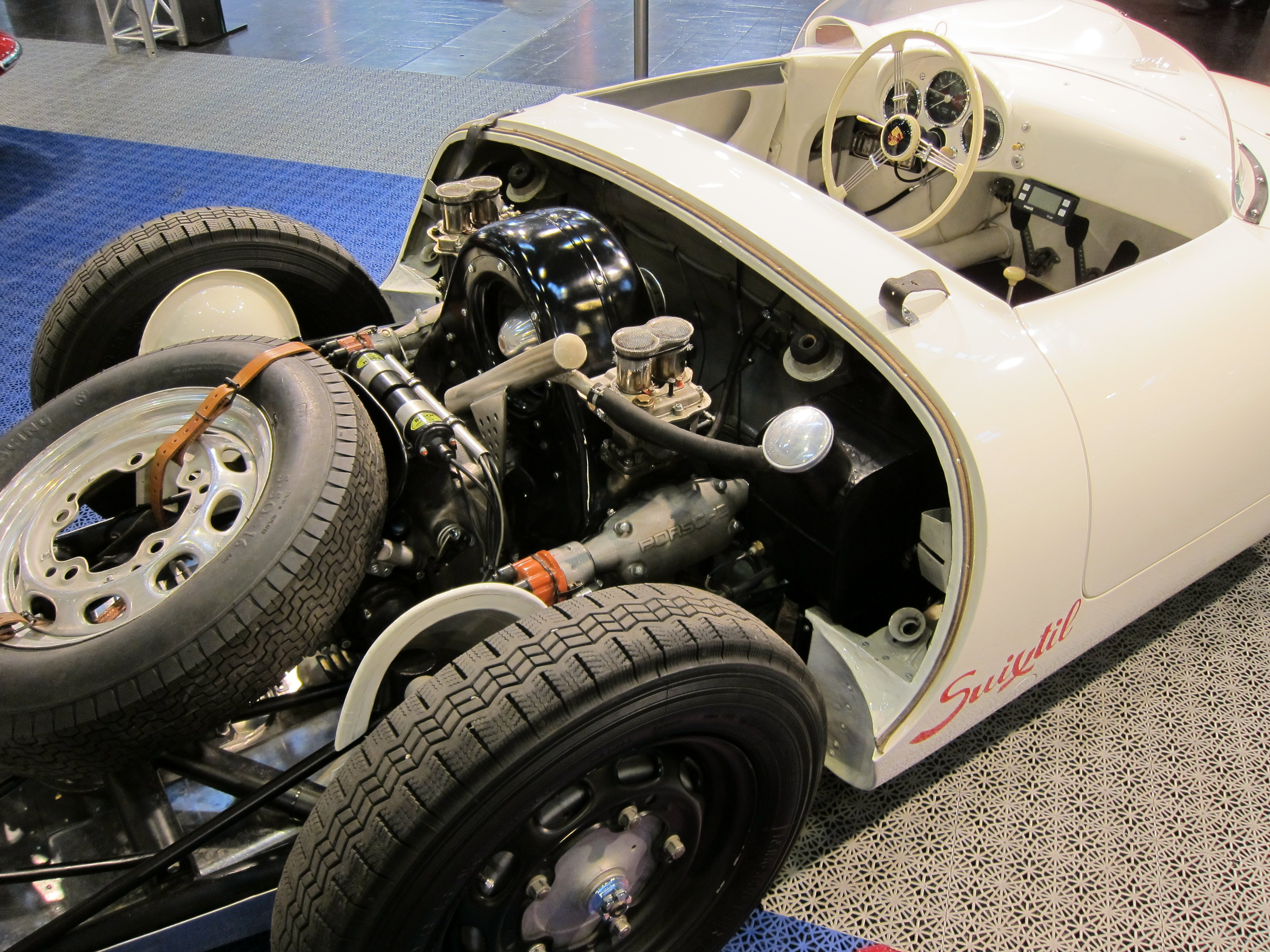
Fuhrmann engine in a Porsche 550

== Sources and further reading ==
In German:

- Boschen/Barth: Das große Buch der Porsche-Typen. 2. Auflage, Motorbuch Verlag, Stuttgart 1994, ISBN 3-613-01284-7
- Österreich-Lexikon beim Projekt AEIOU
