= Porsche 356/2 =

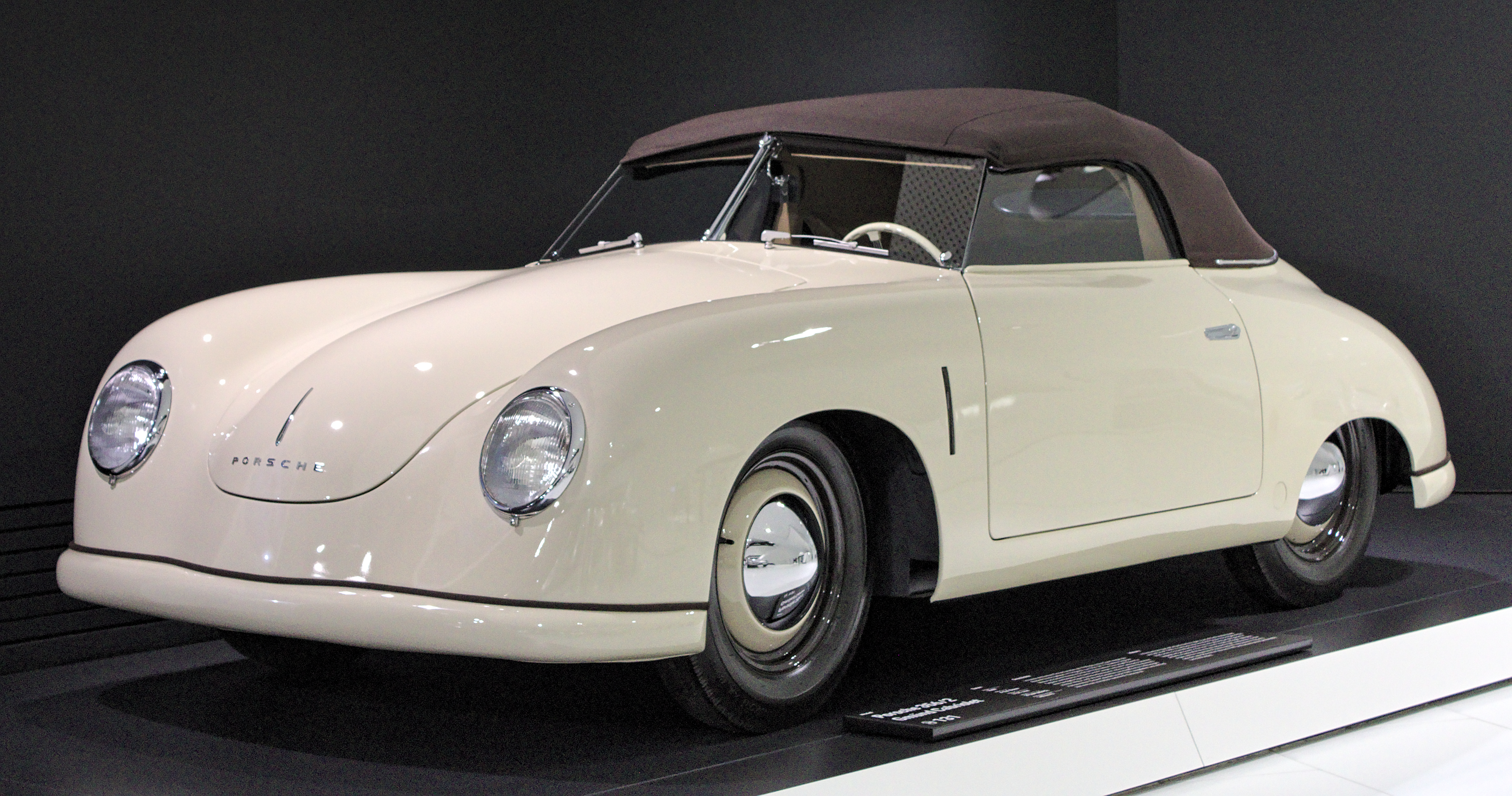
- Porsche 356/2

Overview
- Manufacturer: Porsche
- Also called: Porsche Gmünd
- Production: 1948–1951 61 produced; Coupe: 42; Cabriolet: 8; Renn-Coupe: 11
- Assembly: Austria: Gmünd (Coupe, cabrio); Germany: Stuttgart; Zuffenhausen (356SL)
- Designer: Ferry Porsche, Erwin Komenda

Body and chassis
- Class: Sports car
- Body style: 2-door Coupe and Cabriolet
- Layout: Rear-engine, rear-wheel drive layout
- Doors: 2
- Related: Porsche 356/1, 356 Pre-A,

Powertrain
- Engine: 1131 cc Type 366; 1086 cc Type 369; 1488 cc Type 502

Dimensions
- Wheelbase: 2,100 mm (82.7 in)
- Length: 3,880 mm (152.8 in)
- Width: 1,666 mm (65.6 in)
- Height: 1,300 mm (51.2 in)

Chronology
- Predecessor: Porsche 356/1
- Successor: Porsche 356

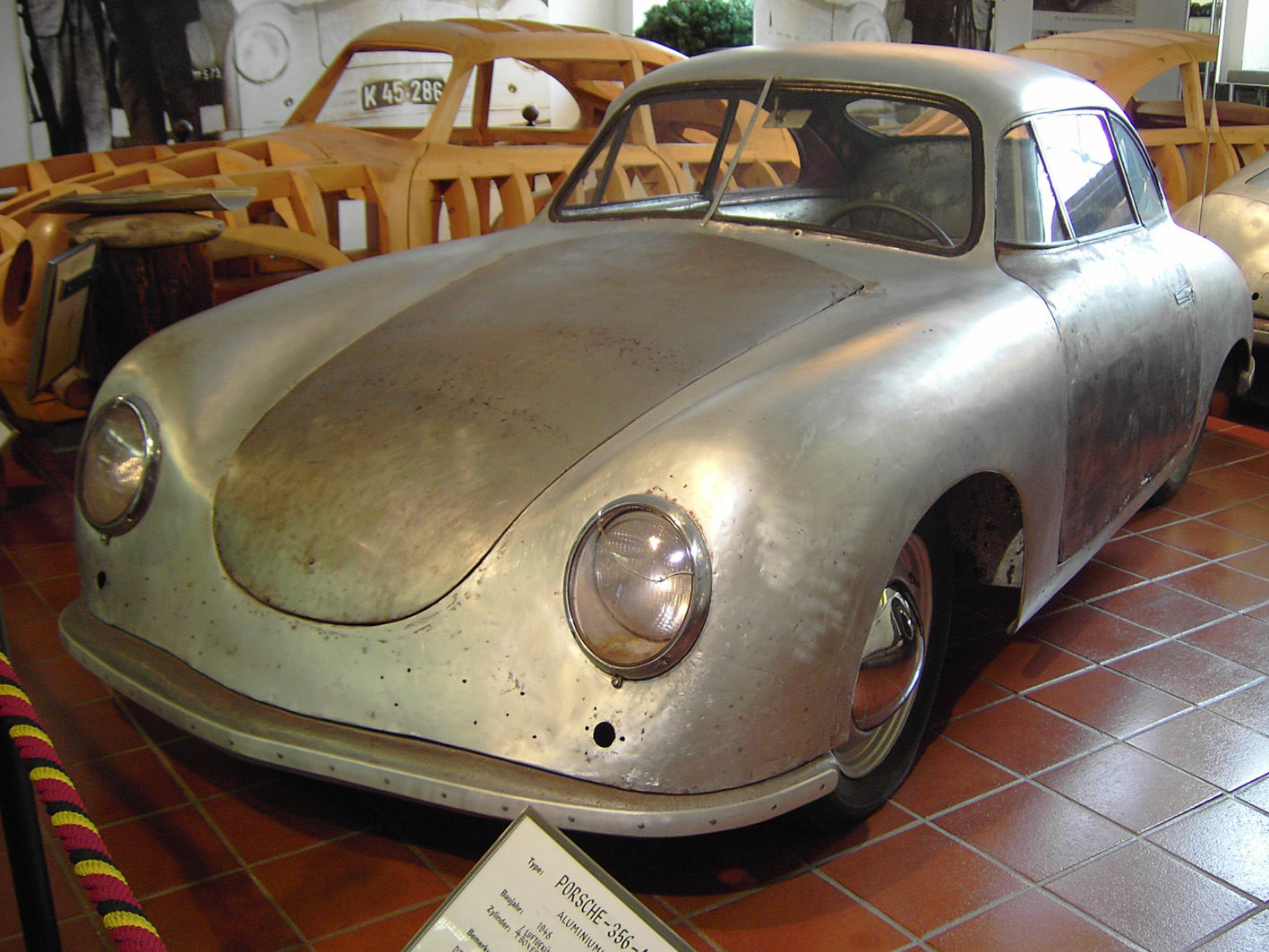
356/2-020 Porsche Automuseum Helmut Pfeifhofer Gmund

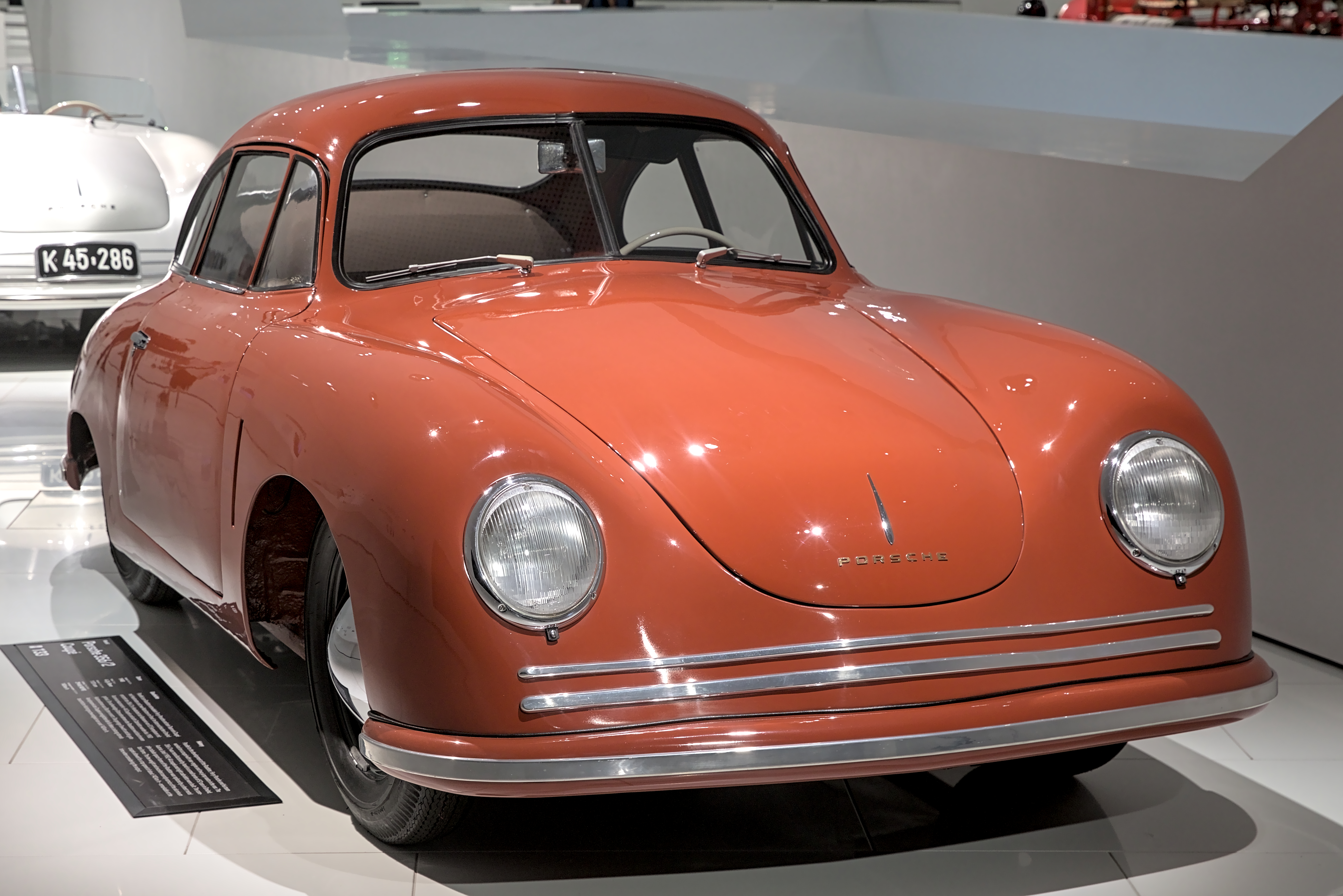
356/2-009 Porsche Museum Stuttgart 2009

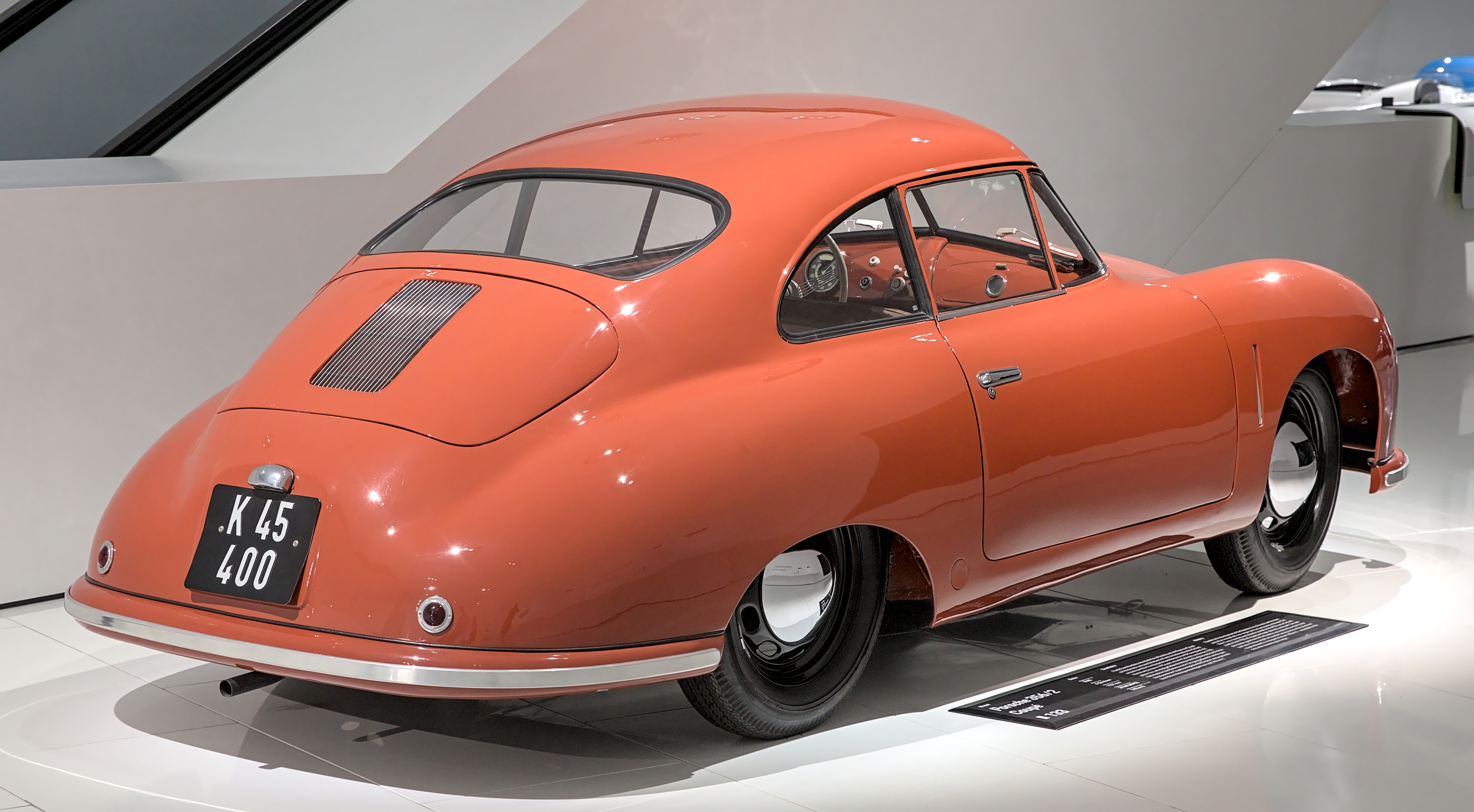
356/2-009 Porsche Museum Stuttgart 2009

The Porsche 356/2 is the first iteration of the Porsche 356 sports car. Produced between 1948 and 1951, the Porsche 356/2 was the first series production aluminum bodied sports car of Porsche after the creation of the 356-001 one-off prototype in Gmünd, Austria. It was built in limited numbers, making it a highly sought-after collector's item today.

The Porsche 356/2 was designed by Ferry Porsche and Erwin Komenda, and was based on components from the Volkswagen Beetle. The car was built using lightweight aluminum body panels and a welded steel box chassis with integrated floorplan, which helped to keep its weight low and provide nimble handling. The flat-four engine, which was also based on the Volkswagen Beetle, provided lively performance and was mounted in the rear of the car.

The exterior design of the Porsche 356/2 featured a sloping hood, rounded fenders, and a streamlined profile. The car was available in both a coupé and cabriolet body style, and the interior was designed to be functional, with a simple dashboard and instrument panel. The car was also equipped with large windows, providing excellent visibility.

One of the defining features of the Porsche 356/2 produced in Gmünd was its hand-built construction. Each car was built by a small team of craftsmen, and each car was given its own unique character and attention to detail.

The Porsche 356/2 was a popular choice for racing and rally events, and many early Porsche racing drivers cut their teeth in this car. The car's nimble handling and quick acceleration made it well suited to the demands of competition driving, and the car's success on the track helped to establish Porsche's reputation as a manufacturer of high-performance sports cars.

About 32 aluminum bodied Porsche 356 cars are still in existence, including the 356-001 roadster prototype in the Porsche museum.

== First 50 Cars ==
Only limited information exists about this post war period of the company based in Gmund. Herbert Kaes, nephew of Ferdinand Porsche, produced an overview of the first 50 cars in 1951 which is still available in the Porsche company archives and has been published in several publications. Out of the first 52 chassis, 50 cars are known to have been produced in Austria. Some chassis numbers are missing in this list, most likely they were used for testing and possible never received a body or they might have been used for repairing another damaged chassis. Initially the coupe bodies where produced by Porsche employees, but as they could not keep up with chassis production Porsche also started to outsource body production to Tatra, Kastenhofer and Keibl in Vienna. Convertible versions were produced by Beutler, Kastenhofer and Keibl. In 1950 the Porsche company was moved to Stuttgart and production of the steel-bodied 356 pre-A started. Production in Gmund was halted and some of the remaining chassis and bodies where assembled by Porsche Salzburg.

The list shows all chassis numbers with the engine and body number. The chassis where produced and placed in storage on the side of the production hall, final assembly started with a completed body and a chassis chosen on top of a stack of finished chassis, so the body number gives a better representation of the chronological order of production. The engine numbers give a good indication of the origin of the engine. Initially Volkswagen sourced engines where used with "356" added in front of the number. At a certain point Porsche used its own engines which is visible through the low engine numbers starting with number 10 in chassis 356/2-008. Body numbers of the coupe's are listed as 557/xx for the Gmund built versions, except for the versions with a Wx suffix, and 806/xx which are generally believed to be Tatra built bodies.

== The race cars ==
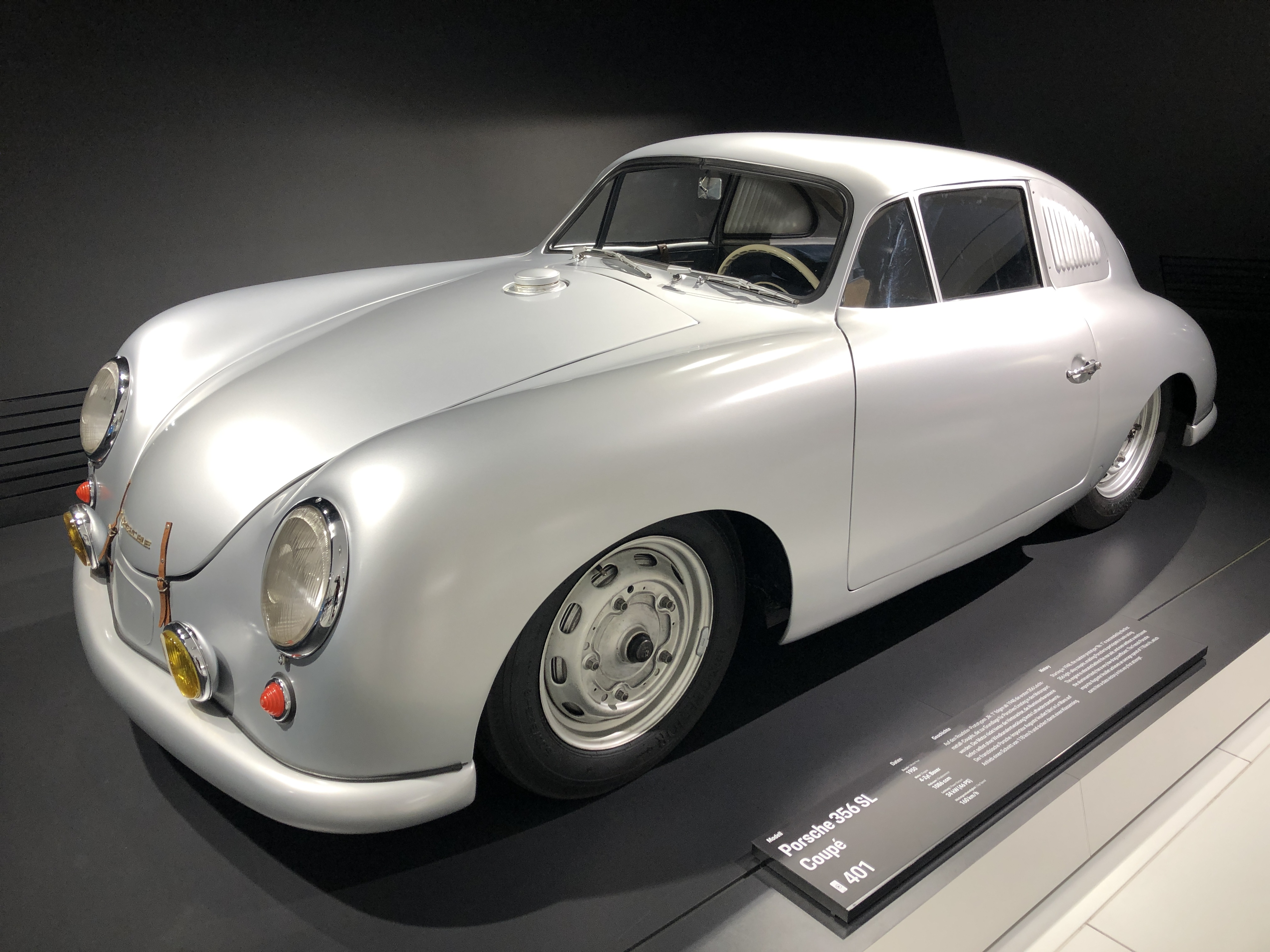
Porsche 356SL 356/2-058, Restored state at the Porsche Museum Stuttgart in 2022

About 63 chassis have been produced in total out of which about 50 cars have been fully assembled and finished in Austria. 10 remaining unfinished chassis with Tatra bodies were shipped to Stuttgart and used for the factory and customer racing cars based on the type 514 design, also known as the 356SL. Final assembly was performed at either Reutter, Dannenhauer or the Porsche Stuttgart Werk. The 356SL cars show some inconsistencies because bodies and chassis have been combined whole or in part after crashes and exported car chassis have been renumbered to the 300x/A range. This allowed for the re-use of chassis numbers which prevented the need for new registration and customs paperwork. For instance chassis number 356/2-055 has been re-used at least twice. These cars also have been equipped with various engines because the engines were replaced after a race or before they were sold, so the original first engine numbers are not always known. The list below has been assembled based on documents from the Porsche archive which contain detailed chassis and body numbers when Porsche ordered final assembly and modifications at Reutter as well as from various publications on the many cars still in existence.

The Stuttgart cars have been produced and modified over a period of 2 years. One car was used for testing purposes but the typ 514 modifications where not performed on this body. 4 cars were initially built for the 1951 24 Hours of Le Mans, and 1 was prepared for private entry into various races making this the first dedicated customer racing car from Porsche. After several crashes one car was rebuilt with parts from the crashed cars. Another 4 were built for the 1952 racing season. Three cars raced in the 1952 24 Hours of Le Mans, one of them in the S1.5 class.

Chassis Number	Body style	Engine Number	Body Number	Body Builder	Final Assembly	Date	First Customer	Remarks
356/2-001	Coupe	356-6-020199		Gmünd	Gmünd	08/06/1948	v. Senger, Zurich	
356/2-002	Cabriolet	356-6-021343	100	Beutler	Beutler	08/06/1948	v. Senger, Zurich	Scrapped
356/2-003	Cabriolet	356-6-014106	101	Beutler	Beutler	28/10/1949	v. Senger, Zurich, Graf Ladislaus Almasy	Restored
356/2-004	Coupe	356-6-014109	356/K2	Kastenhofer	Gmünd	28/12/1948	v. Senger, Zurich	Restored
356/2-005	Coupe	356-6-020896	557/3 (W1)	Tatra	Gmünd	21/02/1949	Helmuth Walter, Marchtrenk, Austria	
356/2-006	Coupe	356-6-063663	557/6 (W8)	Tatra	Gmünd	07/03/1949	Günther Pekarek	
356/2-007	Coupe	356-7-037315	557/4 (W2)	Tatra	Gmünd	16/02/1949	Dipl. Ing. Günther Vorführungswagen	
356/2-008	Coupe	356-1-000010	356/K2	Kastenhofer	Gmünd	27/12/1948	v. Senger, Zurich	Restored
356/2-009	Coupe	356-2-040673	557/7	Gmünd	Gmünd	07/03/1949	Aschauer, Goisern Günther	Restored
356/2-010	Coupe	356-1-026857	557/5	Gmünd	Gmünd	12/01/1949	Porsche Vorführungswagen Dr. Piech	Rebuilt
356/2-011	Coupe	356-2-000029	557/21	Gmünd	Gmünd	17/11/1949	Martin Pichler, Aschach a.d. D. O.Ö., Austria	
356/2-012	Coupe	356-1-102845	557/8	Gmünd	Gmünd	09/03/1949	Franz Walek, Vienna, Austria	
356/2-013	Coupe	356-1-000019	557/10	Gmünd	Gmünd	03/1949	Meyer's heirs, Schruns, Austria	
356/2-014	Coupe	1-000016	557/9	Gmünd	Gmünd	09/03/1949	Robert Mayer, Wien, Austria	Restored
356/2-015	Coupe	356-1-000021	557/11	Gmünd	Gmünd	29/03/1949	Autohaus Liewers, Vienna Austria	
356/2-016	Coupe	356-1-000018	557/12 (W3)	Tatra	Gmünd	22/04/1949	Fritz Reisch, Kufstein, Austria	Restored
356/2-017	Coupe	356-1-000030	557/19	Gmünd	Gmünd	28/06/1949	Dr. Ernst Henschel, Vienna Austria	Restored
356/2-018	Coupe	356-1-000024	557/17	Gmünd	Gmünd	14/06/1949	Dr. Fritz Degerdon, Feldkirch Austria	
356/2-019	Coupe	356-2-000028	557/20	Gmünd	Gmünd	14/06/1949	Ing. Hruschka, Turin, Italy	
356/2-020	Coupe	356-1-000022	557/13 (W5)	Tatra	Gmünd	06/1949	Dr. F. Schindler-Paulus, Kennelbach, Austria	Porsche Automuseum Helmut Pfeifhofer Gmund
356/2-021	Cabriolet	356-1-000023	104	Beutler	Beutler	29/04/1949	Switzerland	Scrapped Engine re-used in 022
356/2-022	Coupe	356-1-000023	557/18	Gmünd	Gmünd	14/06/1949	Dr. F. Müller, Feldkirch Austria	Prototype Museum Hamburg
356/2-023	Coupe	356-1-000025	557/14 (W4)	Tatra	Gmünd	06/05/1949	Dipl. Ing. Günter, Linz, Austria	
356/2-024	Cabriolet	356-1-000015	103	Beutler	Beutler	29/10/1949	Dr. ?, Bern, Switzerland	Scrapped
356/2-025	Cabriolet	356-1-102835	C/1	Keibl		11/02/1949	Dr. René Jaeger, Vienna, Austria	Porsche Museum
356/2-026	Cabriolet	356-1-000011	C/2	Kastenhofer			Mautner Markhoff, Vienna, Austria	
356/2-027	Coupe	356-1-000026	557/16	Gmünd	Gmünd	15/06/1949	Ing. Franz Friedwagner Murau Austria	
356/2-028	Cabriolet	356-1-000014	102	Beutler	Beutler	17/06/1949		Scrapped
356/2-029	Coupe	356-1-000020	557/15 (W6)	Tatra	Gmünd	1949	Josef Müller, Gmünd, Austria	
356/2-030	Cabriolet	356-1-000012	105	Beutler	Beutler	30/08/1949		Scrapped
356/2-031	Coupe	356-2-000027	557/22		Salzburg	12/06/1950	Scania Vabis	Exists
356/2-032	Coupe	356-2-000036	806/28	Tatra	Salzburg	12/06/1950	Scania Vabis	Exists
356/2-033	Coupe	356-2-000032	557/23 (W?)	Tatra	Salzburg	06/1950	S.Exz. Mohammed Taher Pascha, Cairo, Egypt	
356/2-034	Coupe	356-2-000037	806/29	Tatra	Salzburg	12/06/1950	Scania Vabis	Exists
356/2-035	Coupe	356-2-000031	557/24 (W?)	Tatra	Salzburg	16/06/1950	S.K.H. Prinz Abdel Moneim, Heliopolis, Egypt	
356/2-036	Coupe	356-2-000034	557/25		Salzburg	16/06/1950	Autohous Ebner, Vienna, Austria	
356/2-037	Coupe	356-2-000035	557/27		Salzburg	16/06/1950	Scania Vabis	Exists
356/2-038	Coupe	356-2-000038	806/30	Tatra	Salzburg	16/06/1950	Scania Vabis	Exists
356/2-039	Coupe	356-2-000033	557/26		Salzburg	16/06/1950	Scania Vabis	
356/2-040	Coupe	356-V-000003	-	Gmünd	Gmünd	1950	Otto Mathé	Original condition, private collection USA
356/2-041	Coupe	356-2-000040	806/31	Tatra	Salzburg	12/06/1950	Scania Vabis	Exists
356/2-042	Coupe	356-2-000039	806/32	Tatra	Salzburg	12/06/1950	Scania Vabis	
356/2-043	Coupe	356-2-000041	806/33	Tatra	Salzburg	18/07/1950	Scania Vabis	
356/2-044	Coupe	356-2-000042	806/34	Tatra	Salzburg	11/05/1950	Scania Vabis	Exists
356/2-045	Coupe	356-2-000043	806/35	Tatra	Salzburg	18/07/1950	Scania Vabis	Restored
356/2-046	Coupe							Used to test 1500 engine in June 1951
356/2-047	Coupe	356-2-000045	806/36	Tatra	Salzburg	18/07/1950	Scania Vabis	Exists
356/2-048	Coupe	356-2-000044	806/37	Tatra	Salzburg	16/11/1950	Scania Vabis	
356/2-049	Coupe	356-2-000047	806/39	Tatra	Salzburg	15/02/1951	Scania Vabis	Exists
356/2-050	Coupe	356-2-000046	806/38	Tatra	Salzburg	20/03/1951	Scania Vabis	Exists
356/2-051	SL	P-40015	806/40	Tatra	Reutter	1952		Private collection USA
356/2-052	Coupe	356-2-000048	806/41	Tatra	Salzburg	09/02/1951	Otto Mathé	Exists
356/2-053	Coupe			Tatra	Stuttgart	1951		Destroyed during a test at Le Mans in April 1951
356/2-054	SL		806/42	Tatra	Dannenhauer	1951	Max Hoffman (3001/A)	Waiting for restoration in Mexico
356/2-055	SL	P-30010	806/43	Tatra	Dannenhauer	1951	Max Hoffman (3003/A)	Revs Institute Florida
356/2-056	SL	P-30006	806/44	Tatra	Reutter	1951	Max Hoffman (3002/A)	Private collection USA
356/2-057	Coupe		806/45	Tatra		1951	Private customer	Contains some SL features. Part of private collection in the US
356/2-058	SL	P-40021	806/46	Tatra	Reutter	1952		Porsche Museum
356/2-059								no info available
356/2-060	SL		806/50	Tatra	Reutter	1952		crashed and destroyed in an accident at the Bol d'Or, in Montlhéry on June 8, 1952
356/2-061	SL	P-40010	806/47	Tatra		09/01/1952	D'Ieteren, Brussels, Belgium (3004/A)	Undergoing restoration in Belgium
356/2-062	SL	P-40020	806/48	Tatra	Reutter	1952		Disappeared after the 1953 Carrera Panamericana
356/2-063	SL		806/49	Tatra	Reutter	1951		Crashed on the Autobahn while returning to Stuttgart from a test session at Zandvoort in June 1951
