= Porsche 356SL =

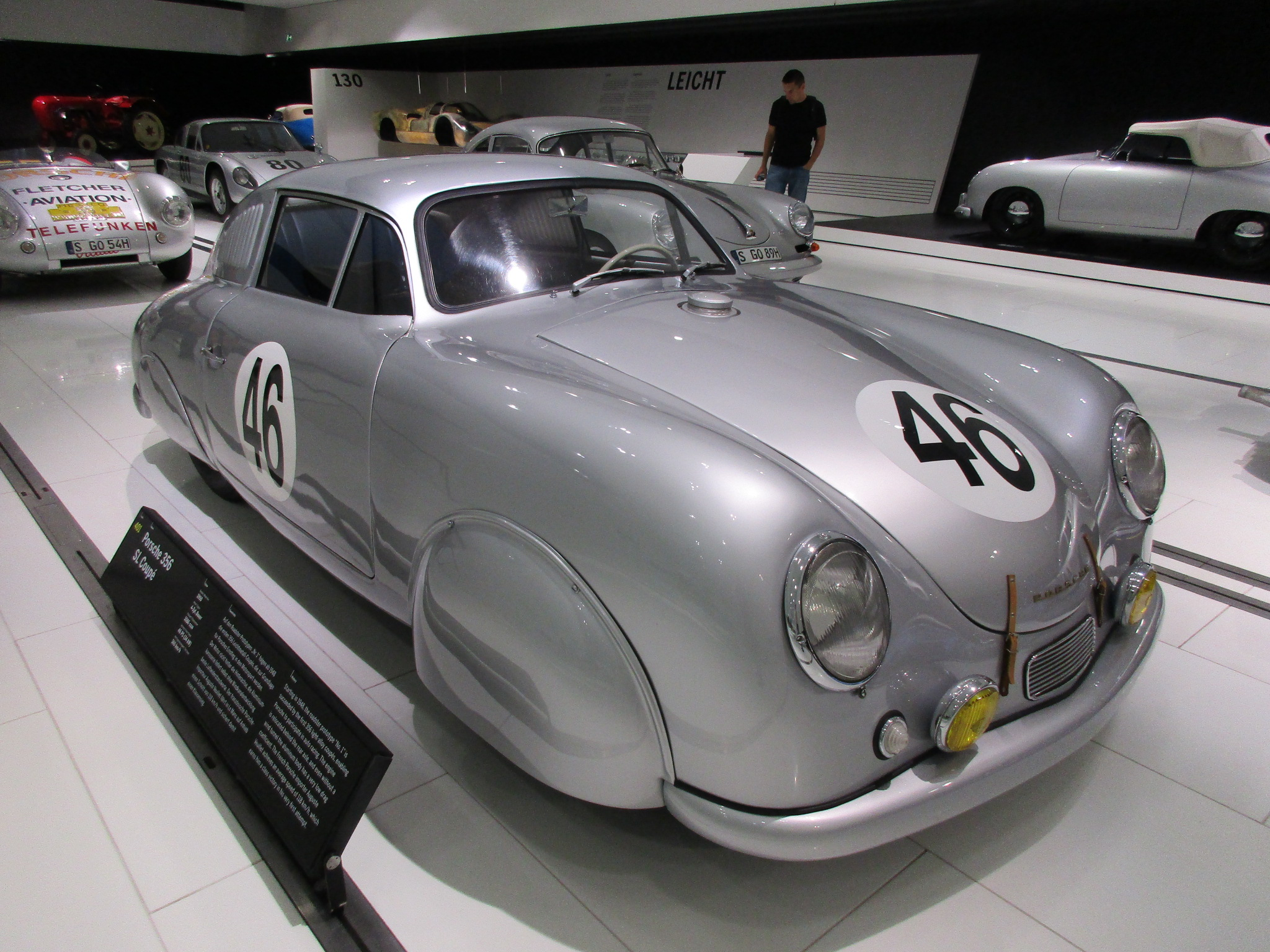
- Porsche 356SL

Overview
- Manufacturer: Porsche
- Also called: Porsche Typ 514
- Production: 1951–1953: ~11 produced
- Assembly: Stuttgart, Germany
- Designer: Ferry Porsche, Erwin Komenda

Body and chassis
- Class: Sports car
- Body style: 2-door Coupe
- Layout: Rear-engine, rear-wheel drive layout
- Related: Porsche 356/2

Powertrain
- Engine: 1086 cc Type 369; 1488 cc Type 514; 1488 cc Type 527; 1488 cc Type 528; 1091 cc Type 533

Dimensions
- Wheelbase: 2,100 mm (82.7 in)
- Length: 3,880 mm (152.8 in)
- Width: 1,666 mm (65.6 in)
- Height: 1,300 mm (51.2 in)

Chronology
- Successor: Porsche 550

The Porsche type 514, also known as the 356SL ("Super Leicht", super light) is a purpose-built race car based on the 356/2. It was initially designed for participating in the 1951 Le Mans 24-hour race. The French Porsche distributor Auguste Veuillet suggested participating in the race during a meeting at the Paris Salon motor show in October 1950. Porsche determined that they had a chance of winning the 1100cc class G with a modified version of the aluminum 356/2 car with the type 369 1086cc engine. The Porsche 356 cars produced at that time at the Reutter factory in Stuttgart featured a steel body and Volkswagen style floor pan which was heavier and less rigid than the box-section chassis with aluminum body of the 356/2 cars. 63 chassis have been produced in total in Gmünd, Austria out of which about 50 cars have been fully assembled and finished in Austria, one or two were used for testing purposes or repairing damaged cars and the remaining 11 chassis with unfinished bodies were shipped to Stuttgart and used for the factory and customer racing cars based on the type 514 design.

== Construction and assembly ==
The chassis consists of welded steel box sections with a 2100mm wheelbase and independent suspension made up from transverse torsion bars and trailing arms with swing axles at the rear. The 356/2 body was made of aluminum with steel doors. Type 514 modifications to the 356/2 body consisted of items like aluminum panels underneath for improved aerodynamics, enlarged 78-litre fuel tank with quick release filler cap and leather bonnet straps. Furthermore, the cars had some specific features for the Le Mans race like extra headlights, aluminum shrouds around the wheels and a 3rd wiper that were not used in every event. The type 369 air cooled flat four-cylinder engine was modified with a camshaft designed by Ernst Fuhrmann and a lighter flywheel, increasing the horsepower from 40 to 46 bhp. The displacement of 1086cc with a 7:1 compression ratio, the Solex 32 PBI carburettors and Fichtel & Sachs clutch was the same as the type 369 engine used in the 356/2 and the first models of the 356 produced in Stuttgart. The gear ratios of the four-speed Volkswagen gearbox were modified as well.

Final assembly was performed at either Stuttgarter Karosseriewerk Reutter & Co or Dannenhauer & Stauss. The 356SL cars show some inconsistencies in numbering because bodies and chassis have been combined whole or in part after crashes and exported car chassis have been renumbered to the 300x/A range. This allowed for the re-use of original chassis numbers which prevented the need for new registration and customs paperwork. For instance, chassis number 356/2-055 has been re-used at least twice. The cars have been modified significantly during the first few years to be able to meet sporting regulations and keep them competitive, for instance in 1952 two cars received a higher roof for Italian regulations and in 1953 a more streamlined lower body was introduced. Various engine types were used in the cars depending on the class they were competing in and following the engine developments at Porsche.

== History ==
The 356SL cars have been produced and modified over a period of 3 years. In 1951 one prototype for testing purposes was built and Porsche commissioned Reutter and Dannenhauer & Stauss to each built two racing cars for the 24 Hours of Le Mans and other racing events. Le Mans regulations required the cars to be available for sale to customers so two cars where prepared in the same year for private entry into various races making them the first dedicated customer racing cars from Porsche. Several cars where crashed and the parts were used to repair other cars. At the end of the 1951 season the remaining 3 racing cars have been exported to Max Hoffman in the US and all three cars still exists in private collections. In 1952 another four cars were built by Reutter for the 1952 racing season and in 1953 one car was rebuilt for the Le Mans race. By that time all remaining chassis and bodies from the Gmund period were used and the focus of the Porsche factory team and its customers had shifted to the new Porsche 550 spyder.

=== Detailed history of each chassis ===
356/2-053 In early 1951 a 356/2 chassis was used for testing 356SL components. This is not considered a 356SL car because the type 514 modifications have not been performed on the body and chassis. It was damaged at the Le Mans race track when driven by racing team manager Paul von Guillaume, he was trying to avoid a bicycle and crashed. This happened during a gearbox and final drive ratio test before the 1951 race. It is generally believed to be chassis number 356/2-053 but no evidence available.

356/2-054 Porsche documentation indicates that this is one of the four cars prepared for the 1951 Le Mans race with the 1086cc engine. It was the entry with starting number 47 and crashed two nights before the race during practice in the pouring rain while driven by Rudolph Sauerwein. The car has been repaired with parts from chassis 063 and exported to the US in November 1951. It was sold by Max Hoffman to Fritz Koster. The car was entered in the 1953 Carrera Panamericana race with starting number 199 driven by Joaquin Castillo de la Fuente and also raced in the 1954 edition of the Carrera Panamericana driven by Jacqueline Evans de López but did not finish in both attempts. The car is still in Mexico and waiting to be restored.

356/2-055 Based on Porsche documentation available in the company archive this is one of the four SL cars prepared for the 1951 racing season. Final assembly had been outsourced to Dannenhauer with the new 1488cc engine installed in the car. It was used in the 1951 Rome-Liege-Rome race with starting number 33 and license plate W24-3475 and after that for setting the Montlhéry speed records on 02/10/1951. It set eleven world speed and endurance records on the Montlhéry circuit near Paris, averaging 94.66 mph for 72 hours. The record setting car was shown at the 1951 Paris Auto show and exported to Max Hoffman in the U.S. in November 1951 with the new chassis number 3003/A. It was sold by Hoffman to Trego Imported Motors, Hoopeston, IL. The car raced extensively and was generally driven by Karl Brocken. It has since been restored and is part of the Miles Collier collection at the Revs institute in Naples, Florida.

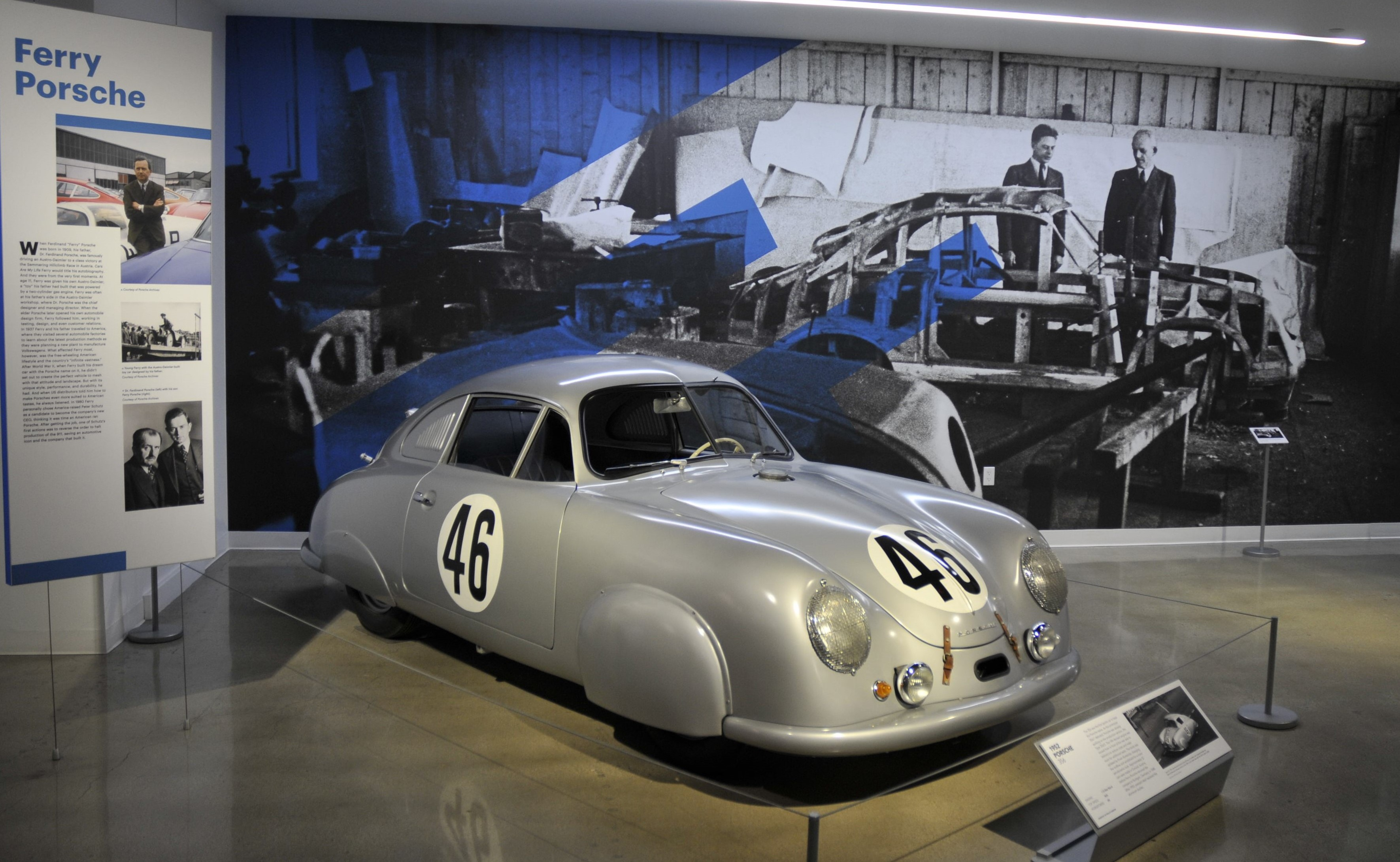
356/2-056(063) 356SL in the Peterson Museum Los Angeles May 2024

356/2-056 is one of the four type 514 cars prepared for the 1951 Le Mans race. Final assembly was performed at Reutter. The history of this particular car is extensively documented and well deserved because it is the 1951 Le Mans class G winner (20th overall) with entry number #46. Based on recent photograph taken during the latest restoration, the chassis number was re-stamped to 356/2-063. This likely occurred just prior to the race when the original 063 car was crashed by a mechanic in a head-on collision on the Autobahn. This car was exported to U.S. November 1951 with chassis number 3002/A. Sold by Hoffman to John von Neumann (owner of Competition Motors in California). The car was modified into Roadster configuration mid 1952. Since then the car has been restored by Emory Motorsport into the 1951 Le Mans condition.

356/2-063 According to Porsche documentation, this is one of the four cars prepared for the 1951 Le Mans race. Final assembly was performed at Reutter. In June 1951 the car was raced by G.F. Roeloffzen at Zandvoort. On the way back to Stuttgart the car was crashed on the Bruchsal-Karlsruhe Autobahn. Parts of the wreck have been used for repairing the 1951 Le Mans entry with starting number 47, (356/2-054) and the chassis is assumed to be destroyed.

356/2-061 This coupe was configured as a SL in Zuffenhausen in 1951 with chassis number 3004/A and was ordered by D'Ieteren Belgium on September 19, 1951. After appearing in the 1952 Brussels Auto Show it was sold to Max Thirion and raced extensively by his daughter Gilberte Thirion. It was the winner of the 1952 Liège-Rome-Liège Rally with starting number 81 and had a long and well documented racing career after that. It was the only 356/2 known to have had been modified to a mid-engine configuration. The car is in Belgium and being restored to its 1952 condition by its current owner.

356/2-058 Chassis 058 was part of the 4 cars prepared for the 1952 racing season. During the 1952 Mille Miglia it was used as a support car. After the crash of 356/2-060 at the Bol d'Or in Montlhéry on June 8, 1952, a new car was needed with a high roof to be able to participate in Italian races. Chassis number 058 was modified and participated in the 1952 Coppa Inter-Europa at the Autodromo Nazionale di Monza with license plate W83-4079. Later it was seen at Porsche with two other cars when they were preparing for Le Mans 1953. During 1953 the car was modified with a lower and more aerodynamic roof which can still be seen in the Porsche museum Stuttgart where it is wearing chassis data plate 356/2-055 which enabled the use of the W24-3475 license plate. The location of the plate covers the stamped chassis number. This is the only 356/2 known to have had the 4-cam engine installed by the factory.

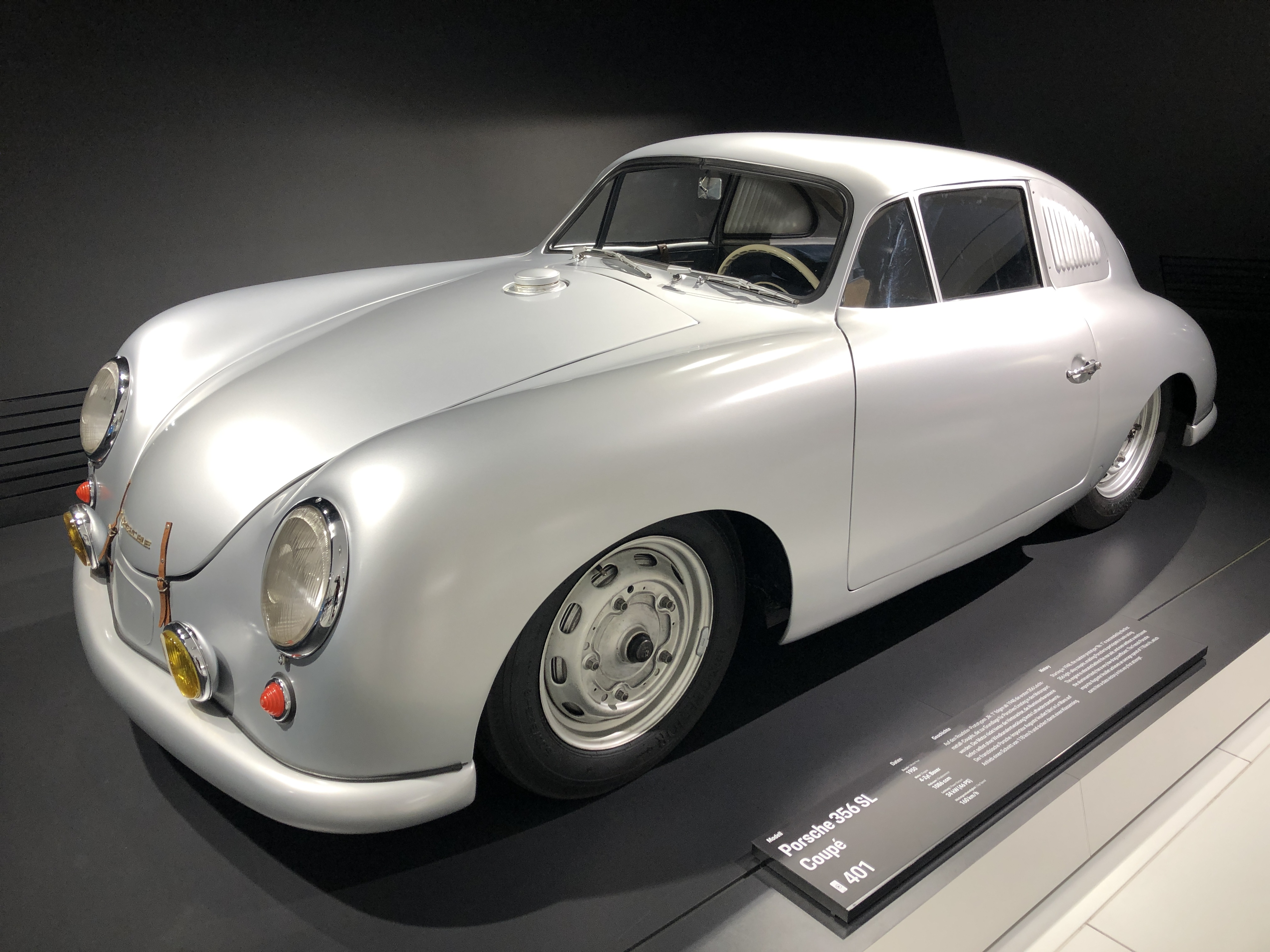
Porsche 356SL 356/2-058, Restored state at the Porsche Museum Stuttgart in 2022

356/2-060 was built for the 1952 racing season and was fitted with a higher roof to meet the Italian regulations. It first appeared in the 1952 Mille Miglia, in which it was driven by Giovanni Lurani and Konstantin Berkheim. They finished the race in 46th place overall and first in the GT class under 1500cc with a total time of 14h53m03". Unfortunately, this car finished its racing career just a month later when it was crashed by André Le Jamtel on the second lap of the Bol d'Or at the Montlhéry race track on June 8, 1952. The car was damaged beyond repair.

356/2-062 This car is part of the 4 cars configured as an SL in Zuffenhausen for the 1952 racing season. It finished 11th overall and first in class up to 1100cc in Le Mans 1952 with starting number 50 and licence plate W83-4080. In the 1953 Le Mans race it started with number 46 and did not finish. Later in 1953 it competed at Silverstone (starting number 6) with the drivers Auguste Veuillet and Edmond Mouche before it was transported to Mexico for the 1953 Carrera Panamericana driven by Guillermo Suhr Contreras and Oscar Alfonso (Number 153). Before the race the car had an accident during practice but was repaired and was able to start the race. 356/2-062 never finished the 1953 Carrera Panamericana. Since then this car was entered in several races up to 1957 in El Salvador but not seen since.

356/2-051 Is the fourth car used in the 1952 season with body number 806/40. It participated in Le Mans 1952 and Liege-Rome-Liege with chassis number 055 so the license plate W24-3475 could be used. In 1953 a rebuilt car with chassis number 058 was prepared for Le Mans. It was assembled with body number 806/40 and most likely the original chassis number 356/2-051. The roof was changed to a more streamlined low roof with aluminum trim around the windscreen. This car still exists in a private collection in the US with the last digit of the original chassis number ground off and replaced with a 5. The car has two chassis numbers as it features the modified stamped number 055 and the smaller style chassis plate which was introduced in March 1953 with number 356/2-058, so this is not an original Gmünd period chassis number plate. This chassis number allowed it to race with the W83-4079 license plate. The car participated in the 1953 Le Mans race with starting number 47, the Liège-Rome-Liège with starting number 4 and was later seen with its distinctive aluminum trim around the windshield and the low roof at the 12Hrs of Sebring in 1955 with starting number 69.

=== Racing history ===
The table below gives an overview of the racing history of the Porsche 356SL cars. The original chassis number is listed for each event with the chassis number carried during the event between brackets.

Year	Event	Date	Chassis	Engine	Starting number	Driver	Result
1951	Zandvoort	09/06/1951	356/2-063	1086cc	10	G.F. Roeloffzen	Crashed on way back to Stuttgart
1951	24 Hours of Le Mans	23/06/1951	356/2-056(063)	1086cc	46	Auguste Veuillet / Edmond Mouche	20th overall, winner under 1100cc class
1951	24 Hours of Le Mans	21/06/1951	356/2-055	1086cc	47	Rudolf Sauerwein / Robert Brunet	Crashed during practice
1951	Liège–Rome–Liège	15/08/1951	356/2-056(063)	1086cc	16	Huschke von Hanstein / Petermax Müller	Tenth overall and second in the 1100cc class
1951	Liège–Rome–Liège	15/08/1951	356/2-055	1488cc	33	Paul von Guilleaume / Heinrich von der Mühle	Third overall and first in the 1500cc class
1951	Monthlery	07/10/1951	356/2-055		96	August Veuillet	1st
1952	Rallye Paris – Saint-Raphaël Féminin	27/02/1952	356/2-061(3004)		72	Gilberte Thirion / Max Thirion	
1952	Vero Beach 12 Hours	08/03/1952	356/2-054(3001)		41	Fritz Koster	16th overall and 6th in class
1952	Vero Beach 12 Hours	08/03/1952	356/2-055(3003)		57	Karl Brocken	7th overall and first in class
1952	12h Sebring	15/03/1952	356/2-054(3001)		31	Fritz Koster	DNS
1952	Wolverthem	16/03/1952	356/2-061(3004)			Gilberte Thirion	3th overall
1952	Palm Springs	23/03/1952	356/2-056(3002)			John von Neumann	
1952	Rallye International Lyon-Charbonnieres	28/03/1952	356/2-061(3004)			Gilberte Thirion / Max Thirion	Retired
1952	Rallye Soleil-Cannes	06/04/1952	356/2-061(3004)		207	Gilberte Thirion / Max Thirion	5th overall
1952	Pebble Beach	20/04/1952	356/2-056(3002)	1500cc	40	John von Neumann	21st overall
1952	Pebble Beach	20/04/1952	356/2-055(3003)		11	Karl Brocken	DNF
1952	Mille Miglia	04/05/1952	356/2-060	1500cc	327	Giovanni Lurani and Count Philipp Constantin von Berckheim	46th overall and first under 1.5-litre GT car
1952	Grand Prix de Bordeaux	04/05/1952	356/2-062	1500cc	92	Auguste Veuillet	Winner in class
1952	12h Cassablanca	16/05/1952	356/2-061(3004)			Gilberte Thirion / Germaine Rouault	DNF (gearbox)
1952	Bridgerhampton Road Races	24/05/1952	356/2-054(3001)		43	Fritz Koster	3th overall 1500cc behind Max Hoffman in a Glockler
1952	Bridgerhampton Road Races	24/05/1952	356/2-055(3003)		56	Karl Brocken	DNF
1952	Golden Gate	31/05/1952	356/2-056(3002)		11	John von Neumann	16th
1952	Bol D'or	08/06/1952	156/2-060(063)		2	André Le Jamtel	Crashed
1952	24 Hours of Le Mans	14/06/1952	356/2-051(055)	1488cc	47	Auguste Lachaize / Eugene Martin	disqualified during the 19th hour because the engine was left running during a pit stop
1952	24 Hours of Le Mans	14/06/1952	356/2-062	1086cc	50	Auguste Veuillet / Edmond Mouche	11th overall, winner under 1100cc class
1952	24 Hours of Le Mans	14/06/1952	356/2-058	1086cc	51	Huschke von Hanstein / Petermax Muller	DNF (gearbox)
1952	Tour de France	19/06/1952	356/2-061(3004)		62	Paul von Guillaume	
1952	Rallye International des Alpes	11/07/1952	356/2-061(3004)		136	Gilberte Thirion / Max Thirion	retired
1952	Torrey Pines	20/07/1952	356/2-056(3002)		11	John von Neumann	Winner under 1500cc class
1952	Liège–Rome–Liège	13/08/1952	356/2-051(055)		4	Pierre Stasee / Hermand	
1952	Liège–Rome–Liège	13/08/1952	356/2-062		22	Gianni Lurani & Wilhelm Hild	
1952	Liège–Rome–Liège	13/08/1952	356/2-058		30	Huschke von Hanstein / Petermax Muller	10th overall and 7th under 1500cc class
1952	Liège–Rome–Liège	13/08/1952	356/2-061(3004)		81	Helmut Polensky / Walter Schluter	Winner overall
1952	Thompson Raceway	17/08/1952	356/2-054(3001)			Fritz Koster	Winner in under 1500cc class
1952	Stella Alpina Rally	28/08/1952	356/2-052		194	Otto Mathé	
1952	Allentown, Pennsylvania	03/09/1952	356/2-054(3001)		53	Fritz Koster	4th overall
1952	Coppa Inter Europa	07/09/1952	356/2-058		34	Giovanni Lurani	1st in under 1500cc class
1952	Elkhard Lake	07/09/1952	356/2-056(3002)		11	John von Neumann	3th overall
1952	Elkhard Lake	07/09/1952	356/2-055(3003)		117	Karl Brocken	2nd overall
1952	Tour de France Automobile	16/09/1952	356/2-061(3004)		62	Gilberte Thirion / Ingeborg Polensky	Excluded
1952	Watkins Glen	20/09/1952	356/2-054(3001)		76	Fritz Koster	6th overall
1952	Tour de Belgique	25/10/1952	356/2-061(3004)		165	Gilberte Thirion / Max Thirion	5th in class III
1952	4h Turner	26/10/1952	356/2-055(3003)		74	Ed Trego	DNF
1952	Madera Airport	09/11/1952	356/2-056(3002)			John von Neumann	Overall winner
1952	Torrey Pines	14/12/1952	356/2-056(3002)			John von Neumann	Overall winner
1953	Rallye Paris - Saint-Raphaël Féminin	18/02/1953	356/2-061(3004)		66	Gilberte Thirion	Accident
1953	Rallye Sestriere	26/02/1952	352/2-062		72	Bracco Giovanni / Fritz 'Huschke' von Hanstein	
1953	Palm Springs Road Races	22/03/1953	356/2-056(3002)		11	John von Neumann	Overall Winner
1953	Palm Springs Road Races	22/03/1953	356/2-056(3002)			Josie von Neumann	3th overall
1953	Internationale Tulpenrallye	26/04/1953	356/2-061(3004)			Gilberte Thirion / Ingeborg Polensky	Retired
1953	International Trophy Silverstone	09/05/1953	356/2-062		6		
1953	24 Hours of Le Mans	12/06/1953	356/2-062	1091cc	46	Gonzague Olivier / Eugene Martin	DNF (Engine failure)
1953	24 Hours of Le Mans	12/06/1953	356/2-051(058)	1091cc	49	Auguste Veuillet / Petermax Muller	DNF (Engine failure)
1953	Bridgerhampton	23/05/1953	356/2-054(3001)		89	Al Koster	
1953	Stockton	28/06/1953	356/2-056(3002)			John von Neumann	
1953	Rallye des Alpes	10/07/1953	356/2-061(3004)		309	Gilberte Thirion / Renaud Lise	44th overall, 3th ladies, 6th in under 1600cc
1953	Chino	19/07/1953	356/2-056(3002)			John von Neumann	2nd overall
1953	Liège–Rome–Liège	19/08/1953	356/2-051(058)		50	Müller / Schellhaas	13th overall
1953	Liège–Rome–Liège	19/08/1953	356/2-058(055)		84		
1953	Liège–Rome–Liège	19/08/1953	356/2-062				
1953	Santa Barbara	06/09/1953	356/2-055(3003)		49	Stan Mullen	
1953	Belgrado	10/09/1953	356/2-058(055)			Fritz 'Huschke' von Hanstein	
1953	Tour de France Automobile	13/09/1953	356/2-061(3004)		27	Gilberte Thirion / Ingeborg Polensky	Retired
1953	Madera Airport	20/09/1953	356/2-056(3002)		11	John von Neumann	2nd overall
1953	Rallye Internacional de Lisboa, Estoril	13/10/1953	356/2-058(055)		15	Helmut Polensky / Walter Schluter	3th overall
1953	2.5h Reno	18/10/1953	356/2-056(3002)		11	John von Neumann	7th overall
1953	Tour de Belgique	24/10/1953	356/2-061(3004)			Gilberte Thirion / Gonzague Olivier	Overall Winner
1953	Internationale Rallye du Maroc	02/11/1953	356/2-061(3004)		308	Gilberte Thirion / Renaud Lise	8th overall
1953	March AFB	08/11/1953	356/2-056(3002)			John von Neumann	3th overall
1953	Carrera Panamericana	19/11/1953	356/2-062		153	Guillermo Suhr Contreras / Oscar Alfonso	
1953	Carrera Panamericana	19/11/1953	356/2-054(3001)		199	Joaquin Castillo de la Fuente	
1954	Randonnée des Routes Blanches	13/02/1954	356/2-061(3004)		38	Gilberte Thirion / Washer Nadège	6th overall
1954	Rallye Paris - Saint-Raphaël Féminin	03/03/1954	356/2-061(3004)		96	Gilberte Thirion	3th overall
1954	Bakersfield	21/03/1954	356/2-055(3003)		53	Jack Brumby	
1954	12 Heures de Huy	04/04/1954	356/2-061(3004)			Gilberte Thirion	Overall Winner
1954	Rallye Soleil-Cannes	10/04/1954	356/2-061(3004)			Gilberte Thirion / Washer Nadège	4th overall
1954	Pebble Beach	11/04/1975	356/2-055(3003)		53	Jack Brumby	
1954	Andrews AFB	02/05/1954	356/2-054(3001)		118	Al Koster	
1954	GP Spa	23/05/1954		1500cc		Helmut Glöckler	
1954	Lockbourne AFB	08/08/1954	356/2-055(3003)		112	Lloyd Barton	
1954	Liège–Rome–Liège	18/08/1954	356/2-058(055)	1500cc	86	Helmut Polensky / Herbet Linge	Winner
1954	Tour de France Automobile	12/09/1954	356/2-058		229	Gilberte Thirion / Ingeborg Polensky	5th overall and 2nd in class S
1954	Tour de Belgique	23/10/1954	356/2-058(055)		39	Richard von Frankenberg	9th overall, 3th in class III
1954	Carrera Panamericana	13/11/1954	356/2-054(3001)		100	Jacqueline Evans de López	DNF (Gearbox)
1954	Rallye du Maroc	13/12/1954	356/2-061(3004)		214	Gilberte Thirion / Renaud Lise	23th overall
1955	12Hrs Sebring	13/03/1955	356/2-051(058)	1488cc	69	Guy Atkins / Traver McKenna	34th overall
1955	Lawrenceville Airport	19/06/1955	356/2-055(3003)		111	Warren Steele	3th overall
1955	Liège–Rome–Liège	15/08/1955	356/2-058(055)		128	Helmut Polensky / Herbert Linge	retired
1955	Coppa Inter Europa	11/09/1955	356/2-058(055)		6	Richard von Frankenberg	
1956	Santa Ana, El Salvador	25/11/1956	356/2-062			Guillermo Suhr	
1957	San Benito, El Salvador	31/03/1957	356/2-062			Wenseslao Garcia	
1957	Road America	07/09/1957	356/2-057		23	Carl Schmidt	
