= Porsche 356/1 =

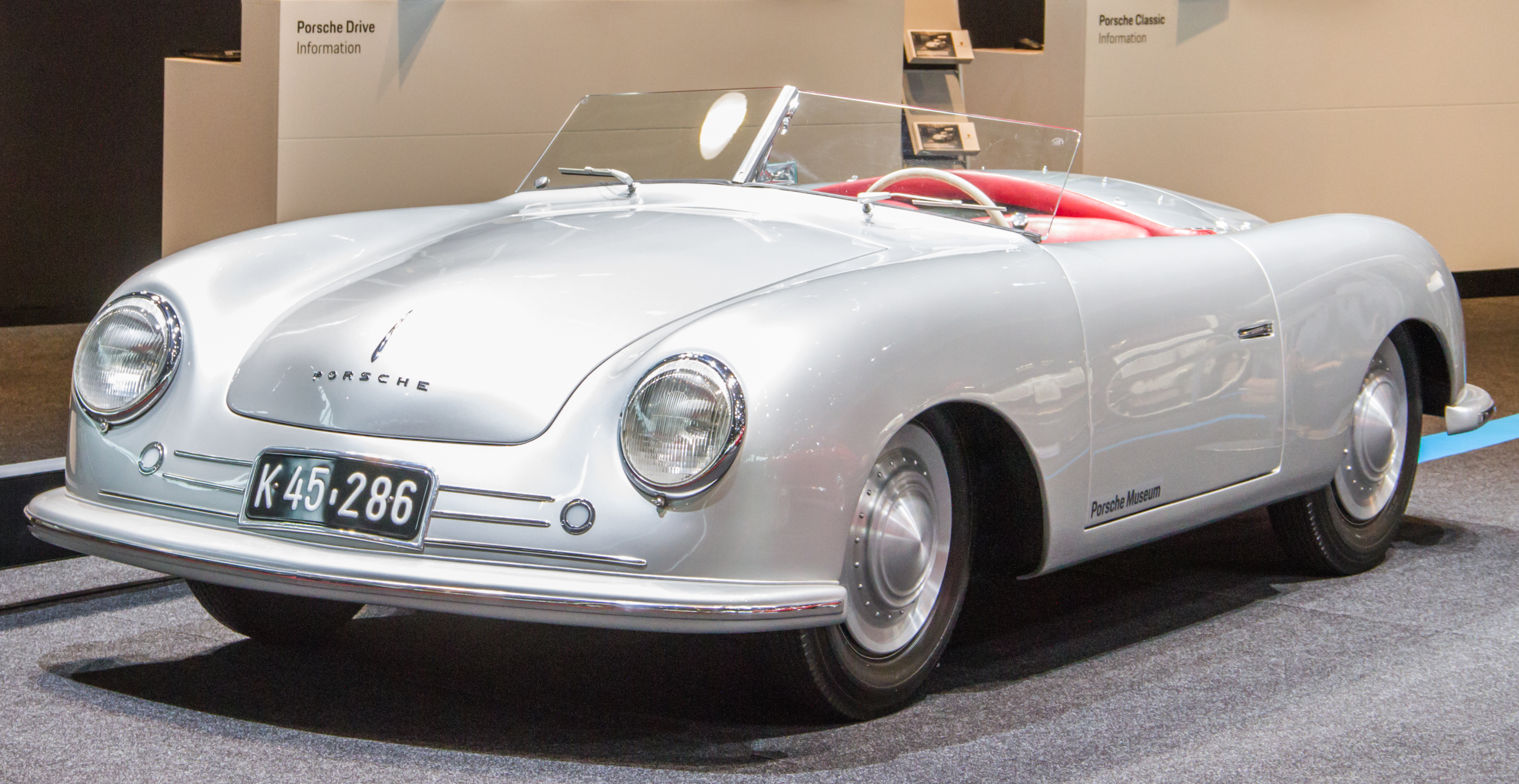

Overview
- Manufacturer: Porsche
- Production: 1948; 1 produced
- Assembly: Austria: Gmünd
- Designer: Erwin Komenda

Body and chassis
- Class: 2-door sports car
- Body style: Roadster
- Layout: RMR layout

Powertrain
- Engine: 1.1 L Type VW369 B4

Dimensions
- Wheelbase: 82.7 in (2,101 mm)
- Width: 65.4 in (1,661 mm)
- Curb weight: 585 kg (1,290 lb)

Chronology
- Successor: Porsche 356/2

The Porsche 356/1 was the first real car created by Ferdinand "Ferry" Porsche. This prototype car was a two-seater open roadster with a mid-mounted, air-cooled flat-4 engine of 1,131 cc displacement that produced 40 horsepower (30 kW). While the body was an original design, most of the mechanicals (including engine and suspension) were derived from the Volkswagen Beetle which Ferry's father, Ferdinand Porsche, had designed.

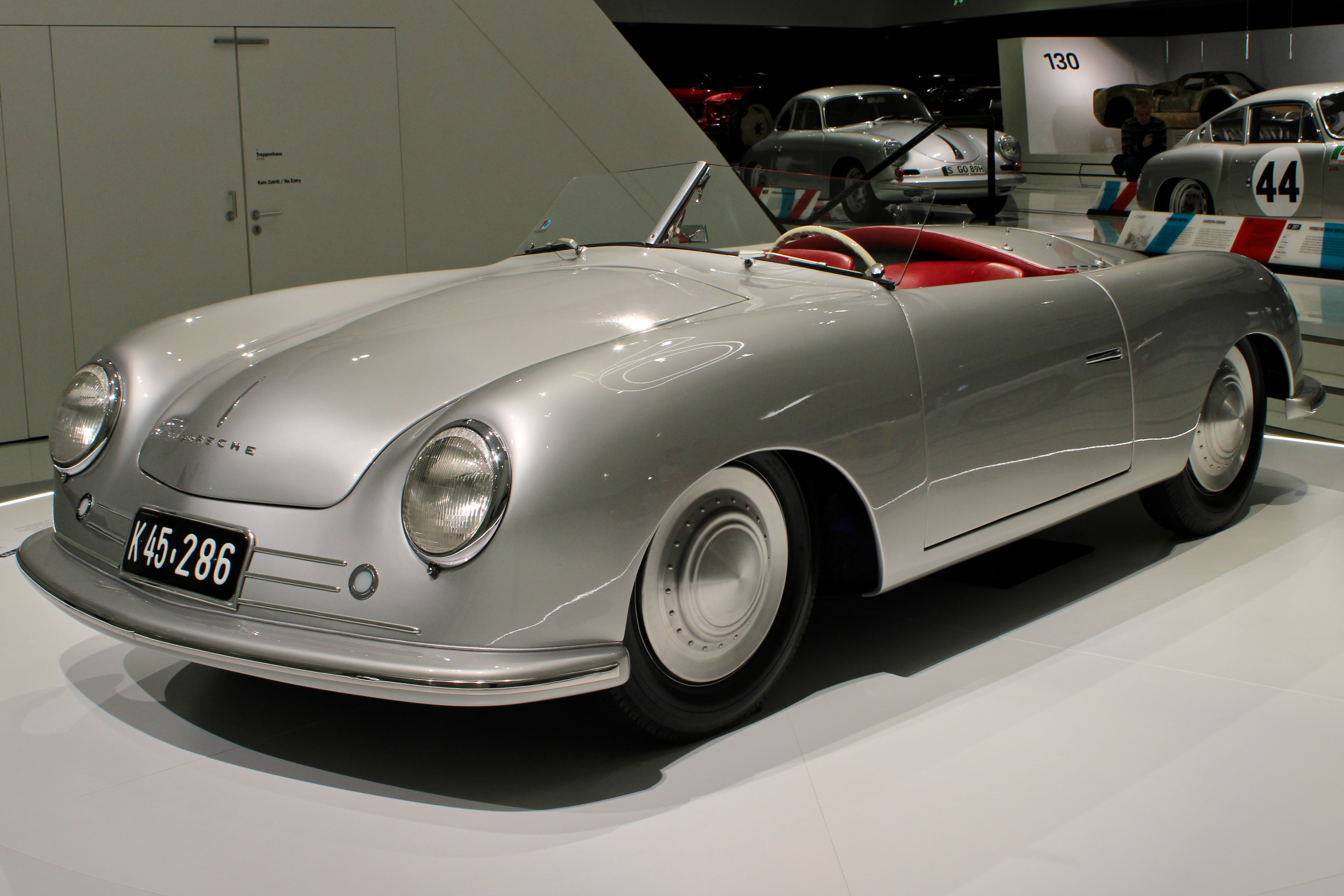
The Porsche 356/1 in the Porsche Museum

The aluminum roadster body of the 356/1 was designed by Porsche employee Erwin Komenda in April 1948 at Gmünd and completed only a month later. Smooth and low, the 356/1 set the pattern for later 356s with one fundamental difference; the engine of the production cars was moved behind the rear axle (to reduce costs and make room for two additional seats). The car was registered by the state of Carinthia (Kärnten) with the license plate K45-286 and made its maiden voyage on June 8, 1948.

Only one 356/1 was made and it is on display at the Porsche Museum, Stuttgart.

== See also ==
- Porsche Salzburg (the company that made Porsche 356/1)
