= Porsche Museum =

Coordinates: 48°50′04″N 9°09′07″E

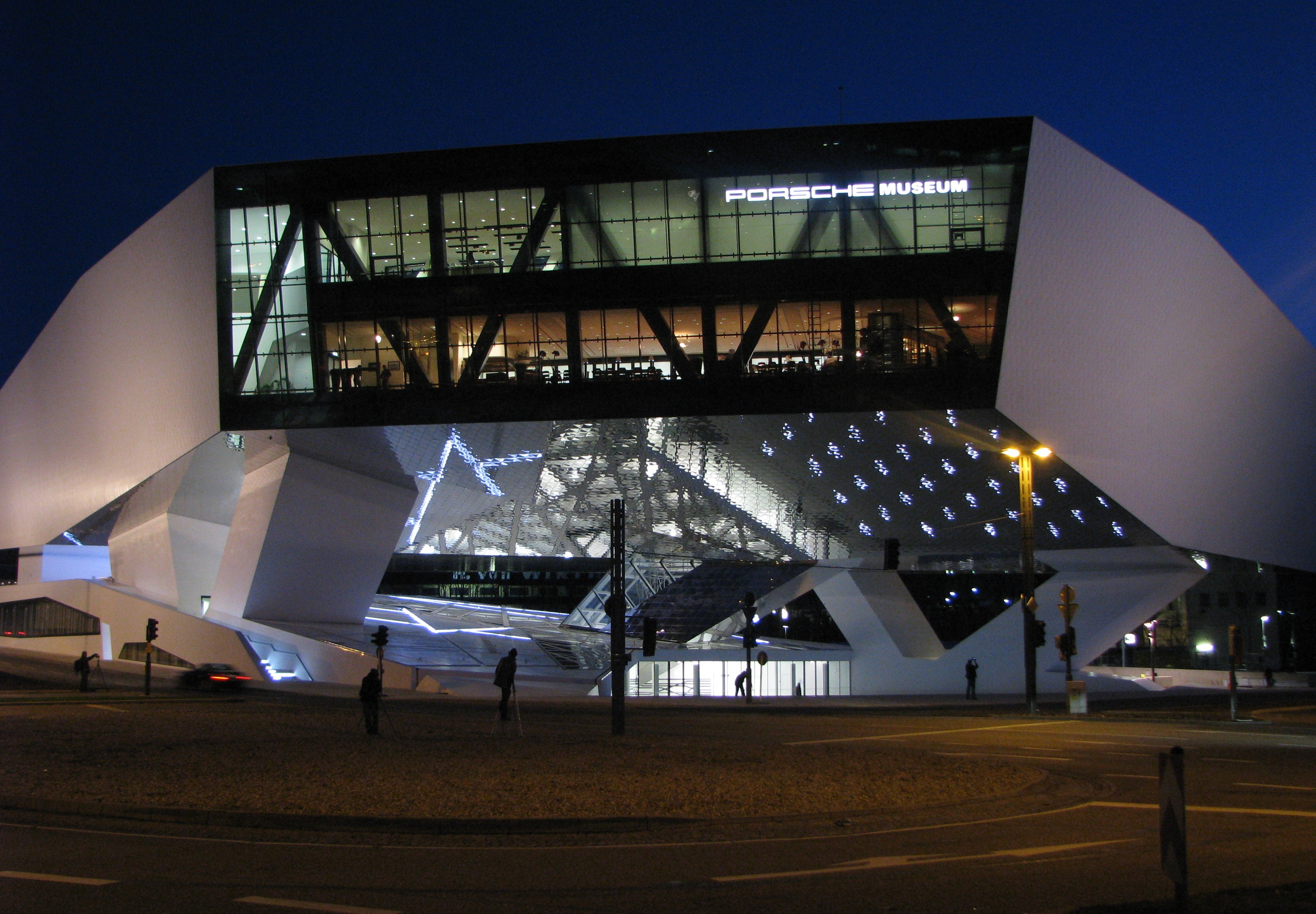
- Main entrance of the museum from Porsche-Platz
- Established: 1976; 50 years ago
- Location: Porscheplatz; 70435 Stuttgart-Zuffenhausen; Germany
- Type: Automobile museum
- Website: Porsche Museum (in English)

The Porsche Museum is an automobile museum in the Zuffenhausen district of Stuttgart, Germany on the site of carmaker Porsche. It ranks second among the most visited museums in Stuttgart, behind the Mercedes-Benz Museum. In 2015, it attracted approximately 450,000 visitors.

== History ==
The original Porsche museum opened in 1976 in a side-road near the Porsche factory. It was a relatively small works museum with little parking space and it was only big enough to hold around 20 exhibits (in rotation).

Porsche built the museum as a kind of "rolling museum" with rotating exhibits from a stock of 300 restored cars, many in pristine condition and still in full driving order. Originally, there was discussion that the new museum would be built alongside a new Mercedes-Benz Museum on former trade fair grounds in the Killesberg area of Stuttgart. After the new Mercedes-Benz Museum opened in the east of Stuttgart in 2006, Porsche went ahead with plans to upgrade and extend its museum in the northern district of Zuffenhausen next to the company headquarters. Originally, costs were set at 60 million euros but days before the official opening ceremony on 29 January 2009, it was confirmed that the actual costs hit 100 million euros.

Work on the concept for the new Porsche Museum began in 2003. A storyboard comprising relevant topics, exhibits and their presentation was drawn up and a permanent exhibition was designed.

== The new museum ==
=== Overview ===
The new Porsche museum stands on a conspicuous junction just outside Porsche Headquarters in Zuffenhausen. The display area covers 5,600 square metres featuring over 80 exhibits, many rare cars and a variety of historical models.

The museum was designed by the architects Delugan Meissl Associated Architects. The exhibition spaces were designed by HG Merz, who was also involved in the building of the award-winning Mercedes-Benz Museum.

On 17 October 2005, the construction of the museum officially began. On 8 December 2008, the museum was handed over to the client, and it officially opened one month later, on 28 January 2009. Since 31 January 2009, it has been open to visitors. The result is an exhibition that focuses firmly on the vehicles showcased. All ancillary architectural, media and typographic elements are designed to be unobtrusive and complement the cars.

=== Construction ===
The building, with a total usable area of 21,000 square meters, that spans up to four levels, including two underground floors. This structure was constructed using reinforced concrete, incorporating 3,400 tons of reinforcing steel, as a watertight "white tank" with flat slabs. It is founded on 115 drilled piles with a diameter of 1.2 meters and lengths of up to 25 meters.

Above the basement, only three core groups remain: a vertical shaft housing the elevator systems and two cores supported by Y-shaped columns. Resting on these three cores is the exhibition building, known as the "Flieger," which weighs 35,000 tons and is suspended at a maximum height of 16 meters as a bridge structure. This structure, up to 150 meters long, features a steel construction weighing 5,500 tons. It spans up to 60 meters between the cores and includes cantilevered sections extending up to 45 meters.

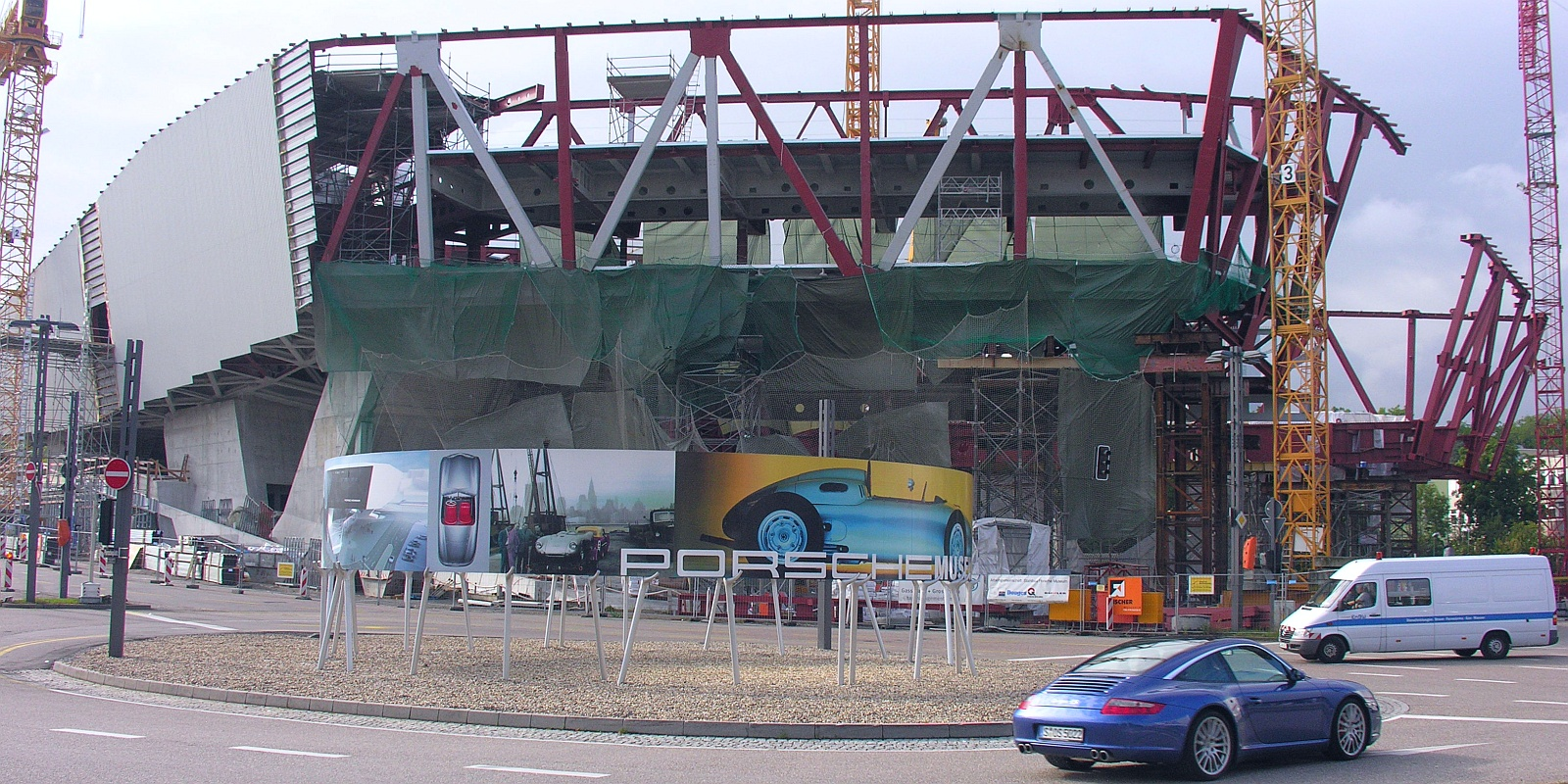
New Porsche-Museum under construction, September 2007

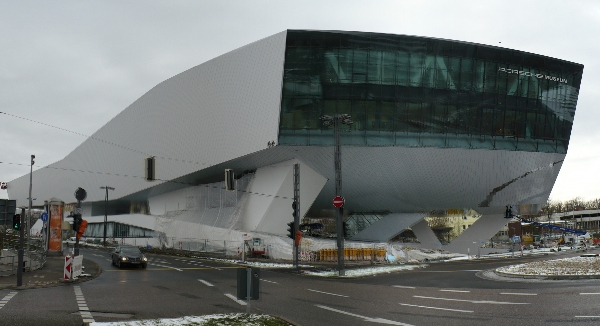
The new museum, still under construction in November 2008

== Gastronomy ==
The Porsche Museum houses three dining options: the visitor restaurant Boxenstopp, a coffee bar, and the Christophorus restaurant located in the upper part of the building. The Christophorus is designed in the style of an old American diner and features a wine cellar as well as an adjoining cigar lounge. The gastronomy services are managed internally by the company.

== Selected exhibits ==
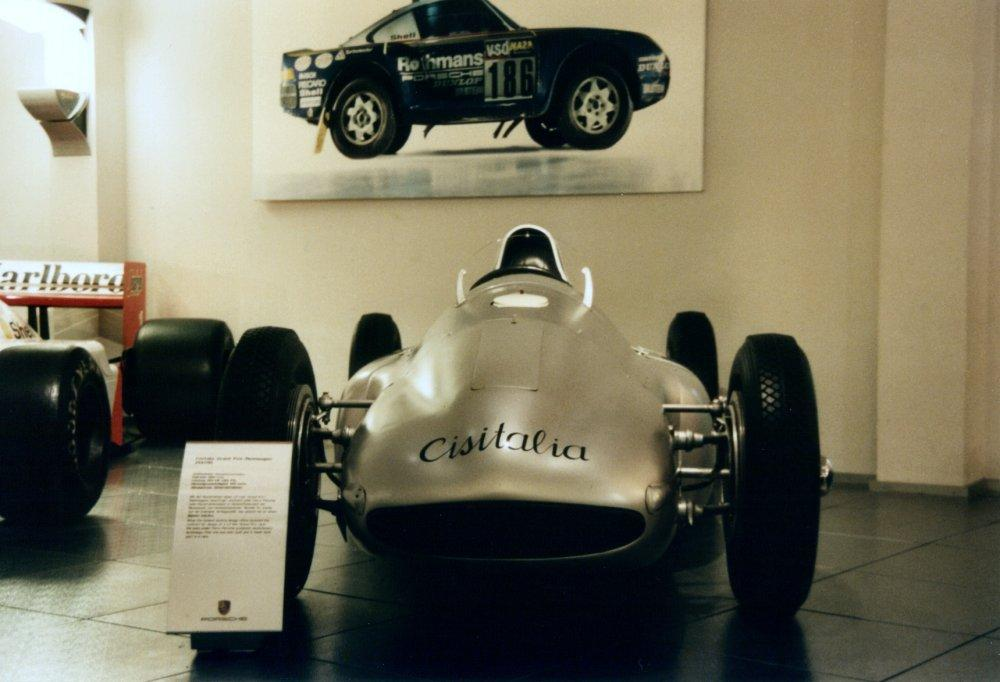
Porsche 360 Cisitalia (1947)

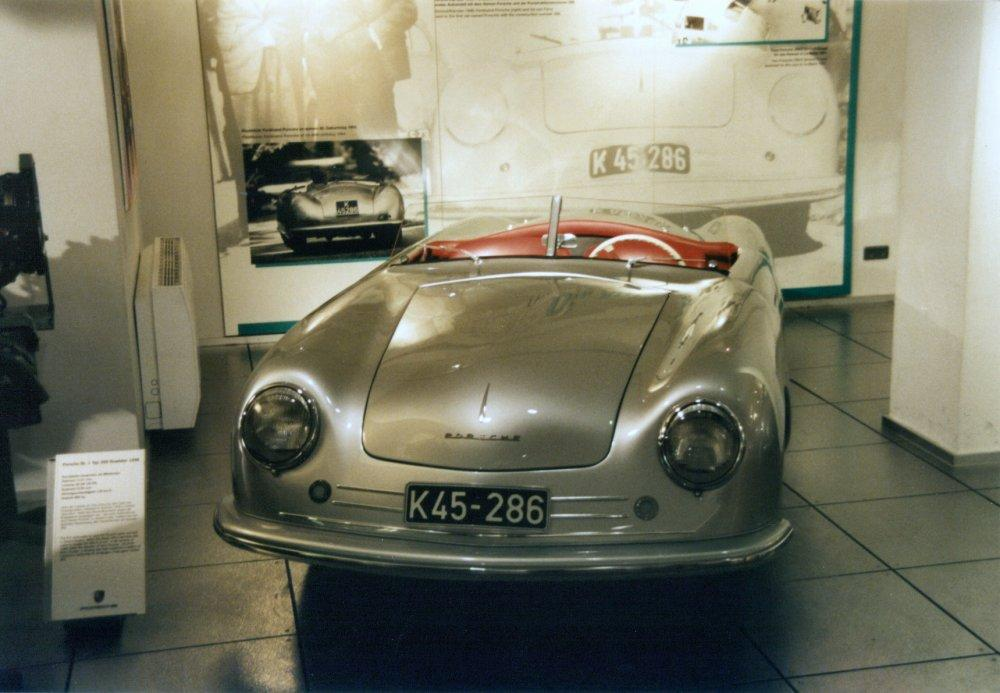
Porsche 356 Nr. 1 Roadster (1948)

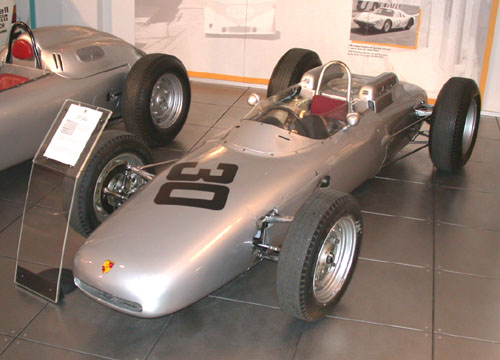
Porsche Type 804 Formula 1 racing car (1962)

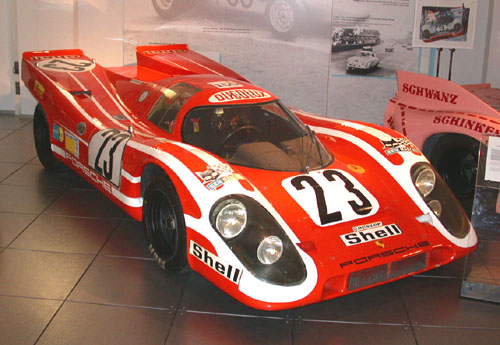
Porsche 917K (1970 Le Mans winner)

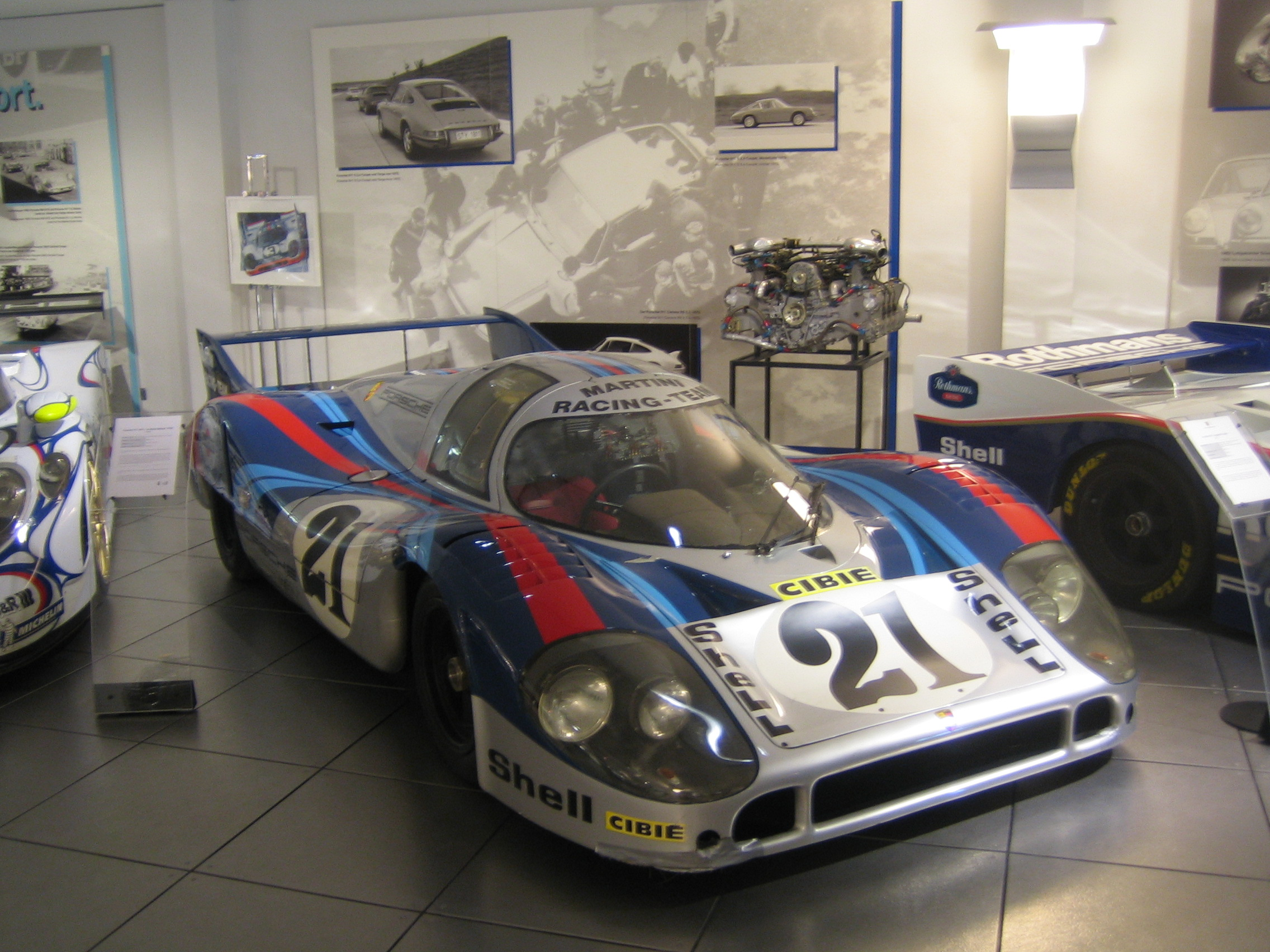
Porsche 917LH (1971)

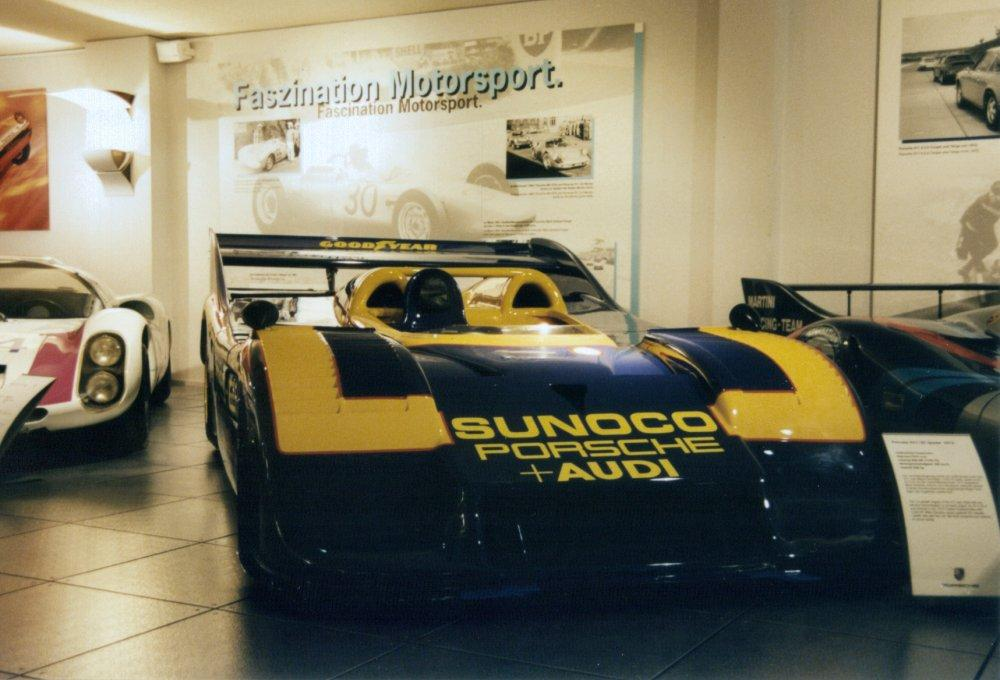
Porsche 917/30 (1973)

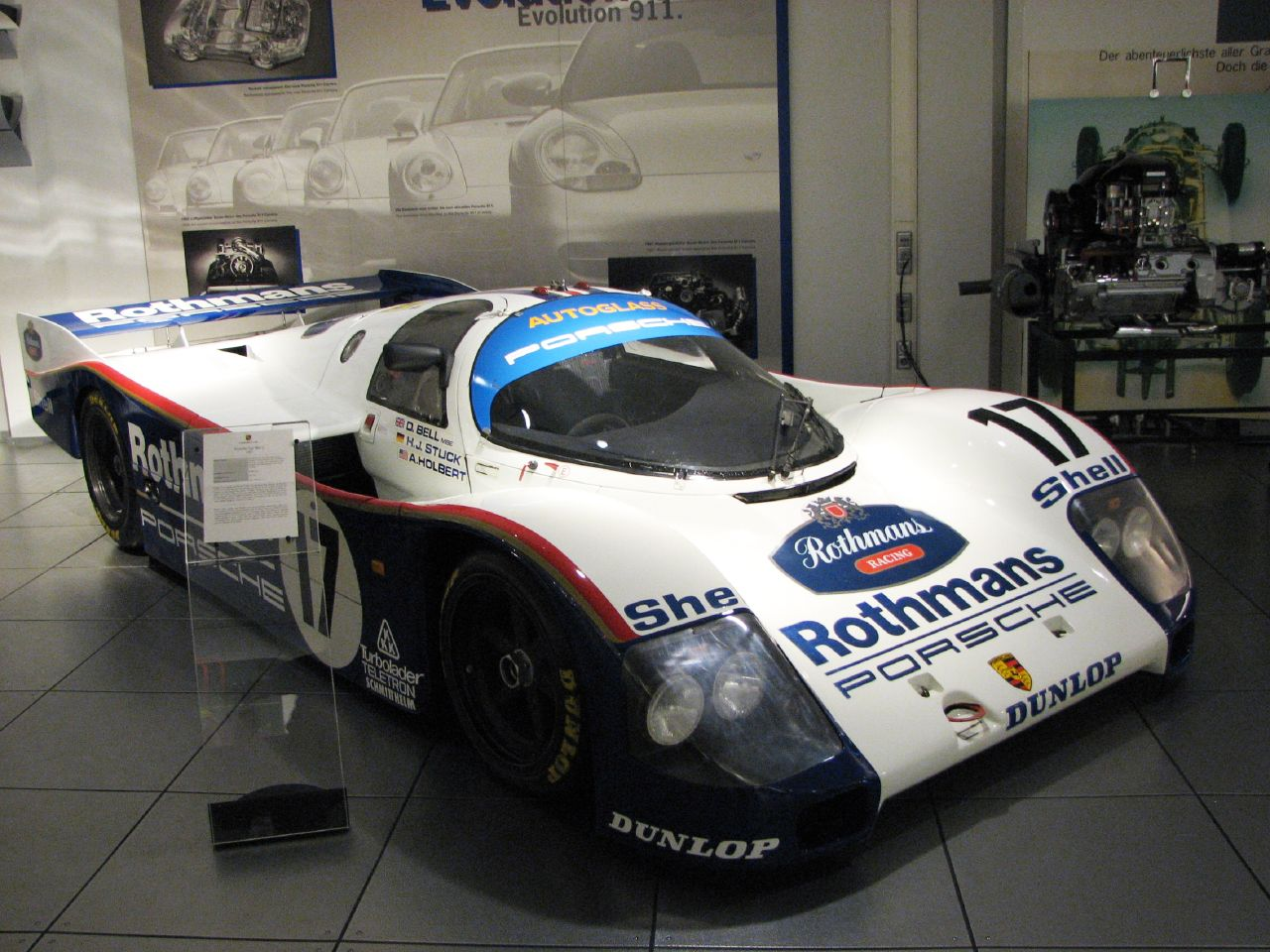
Porsche 962C (1987)

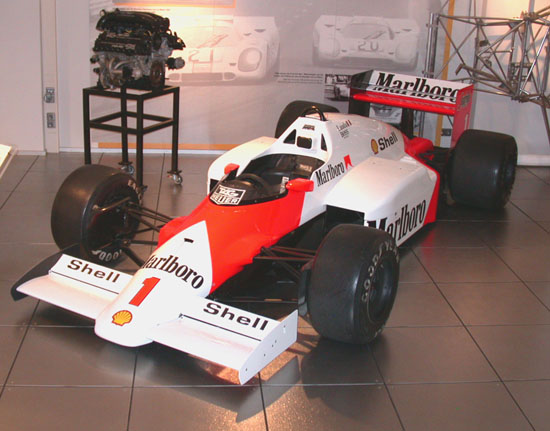
McLaren TAG Porsche F1 (1985)

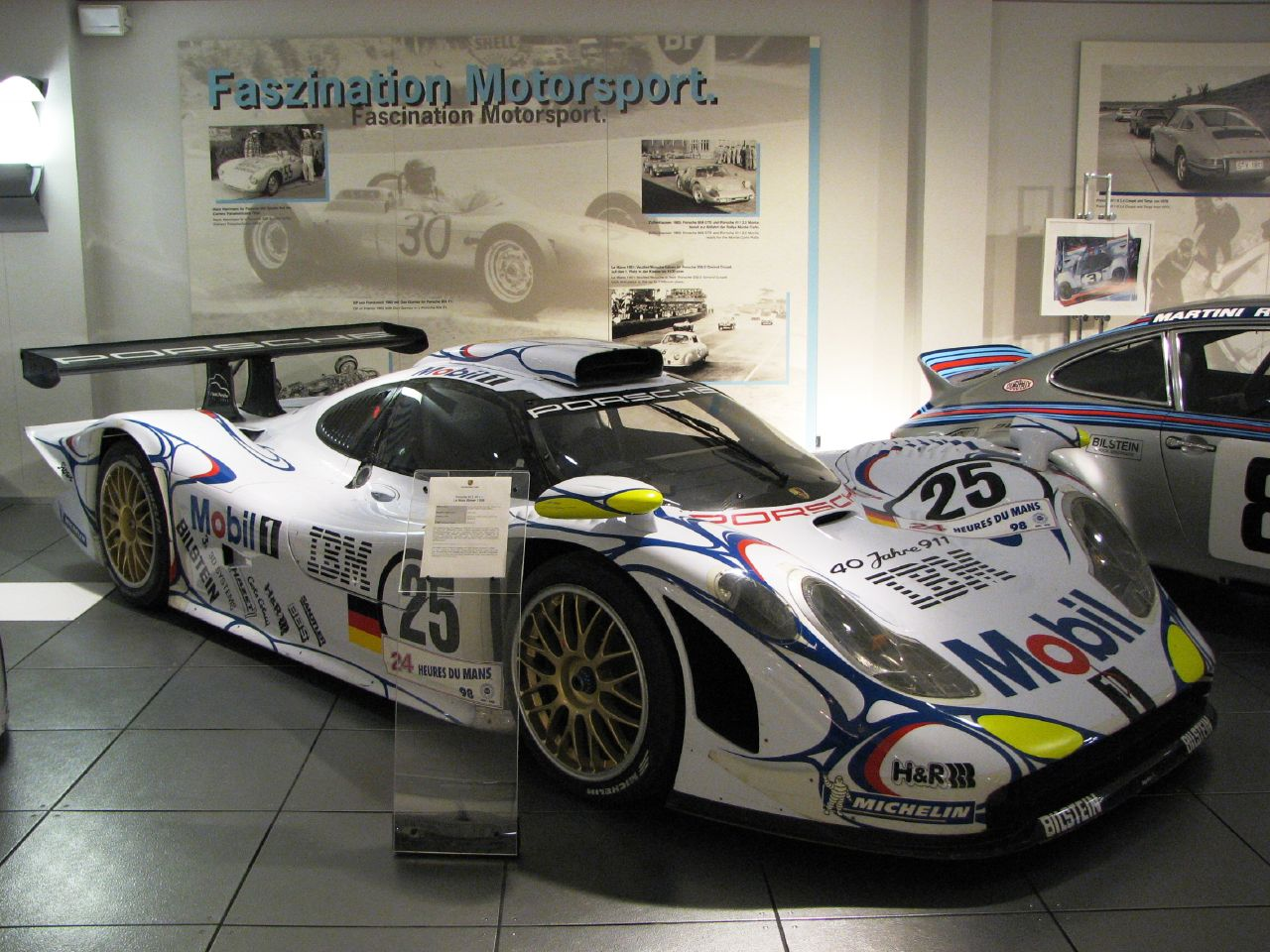
Porsche 911 GT1 '98, with Le Mans starting number 25 (1998)

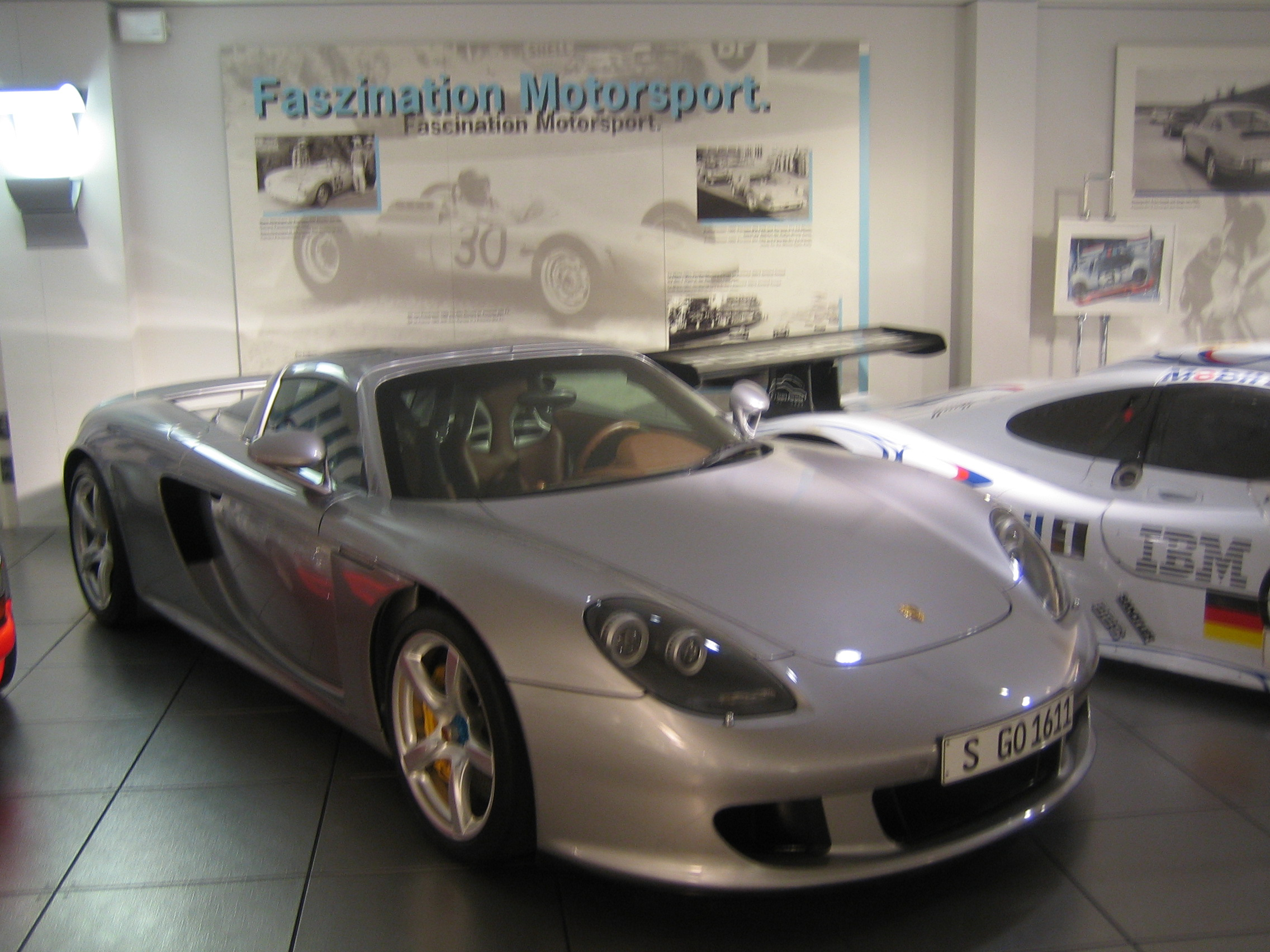
Carrera GT (2003)

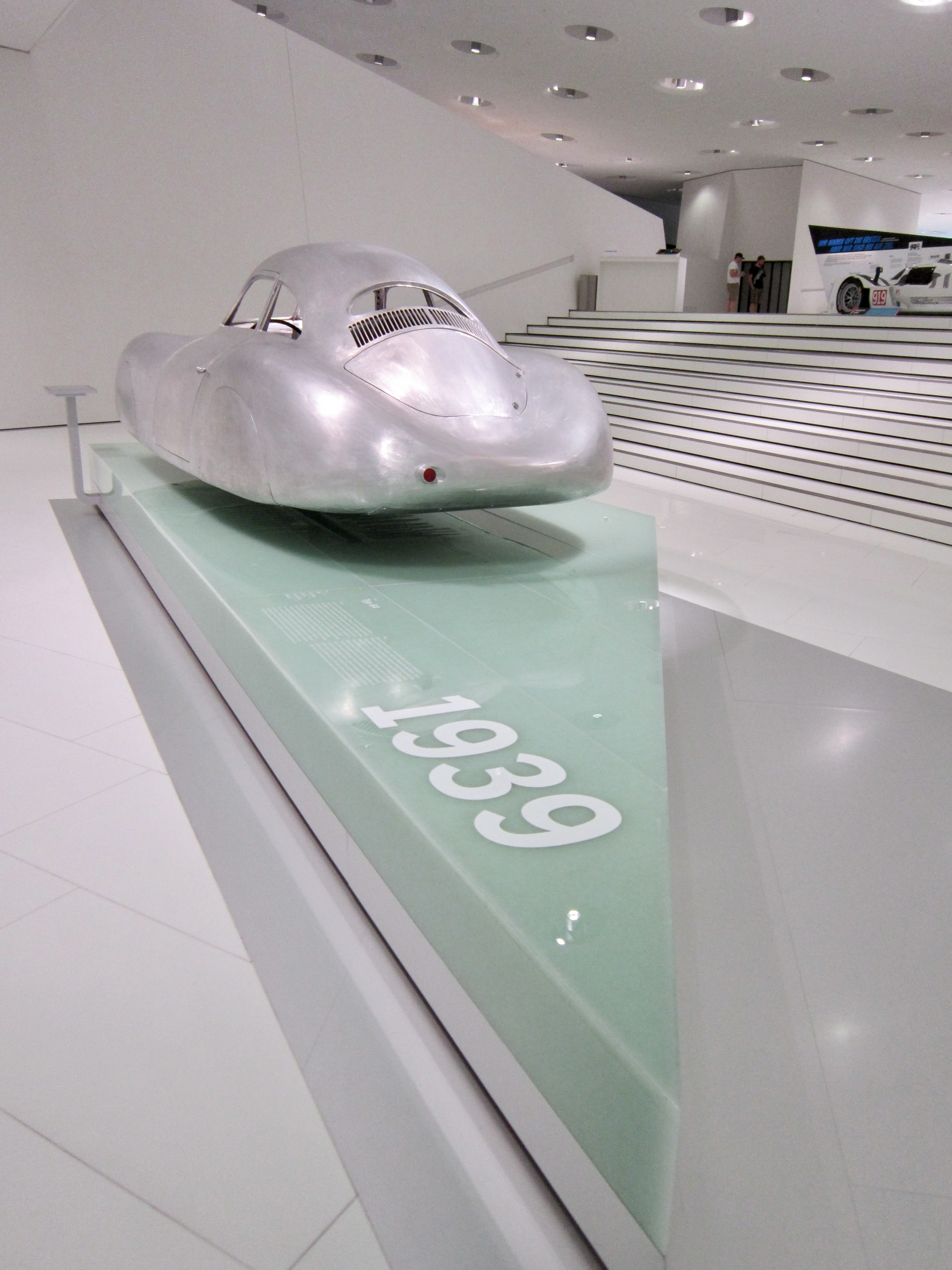
Porsche Museum Stuttgart

== See also ==
- List of automobile museums
- Mercedes-Benz Museum
