= Erwin Komenda =

Austrian automobile designer

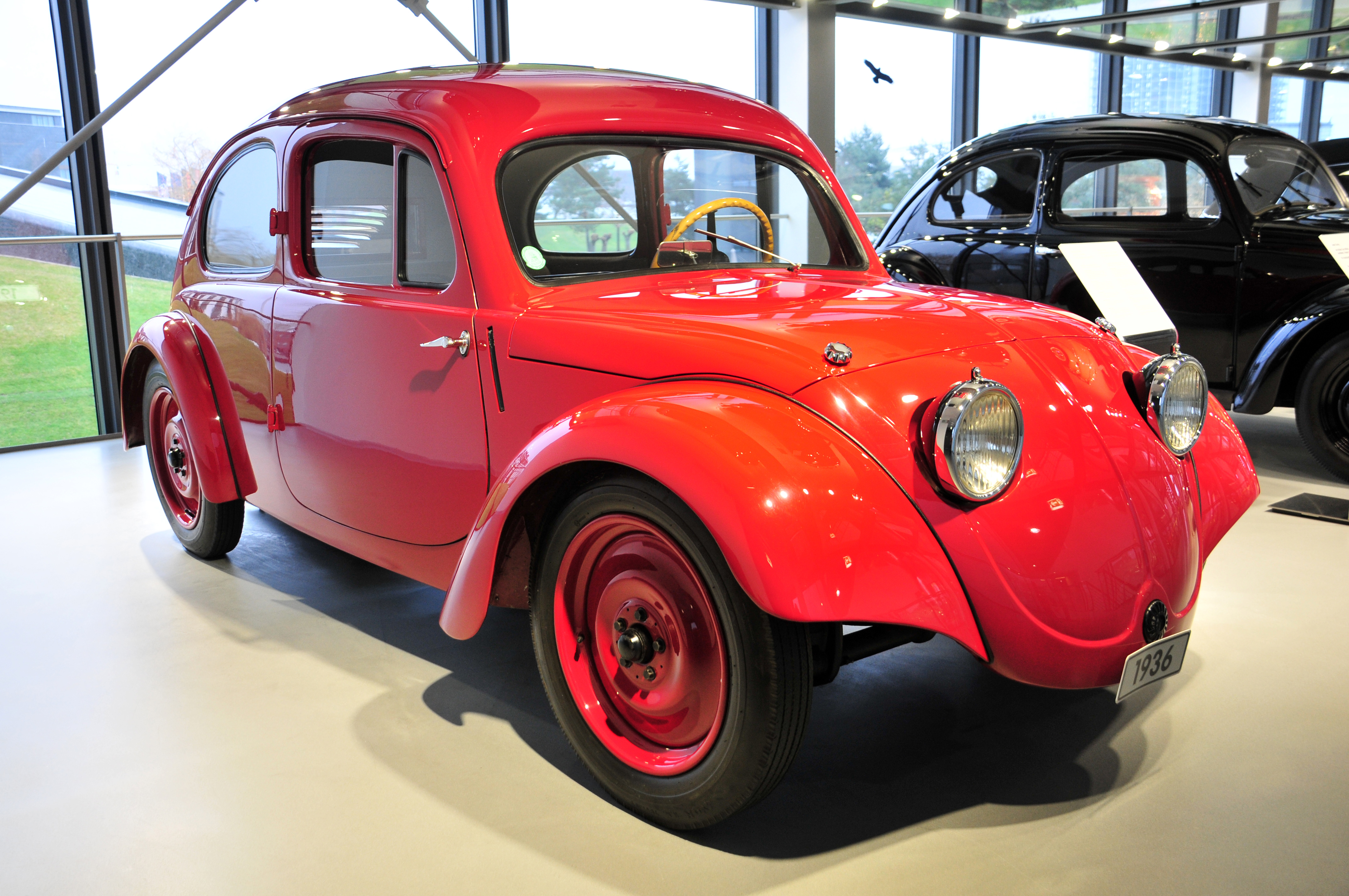
Erwin Komenda was a lead designer for the Porsche Type 60 V3 prototype for the German "Volkswagen" (or KDF-Wagen, as called later)

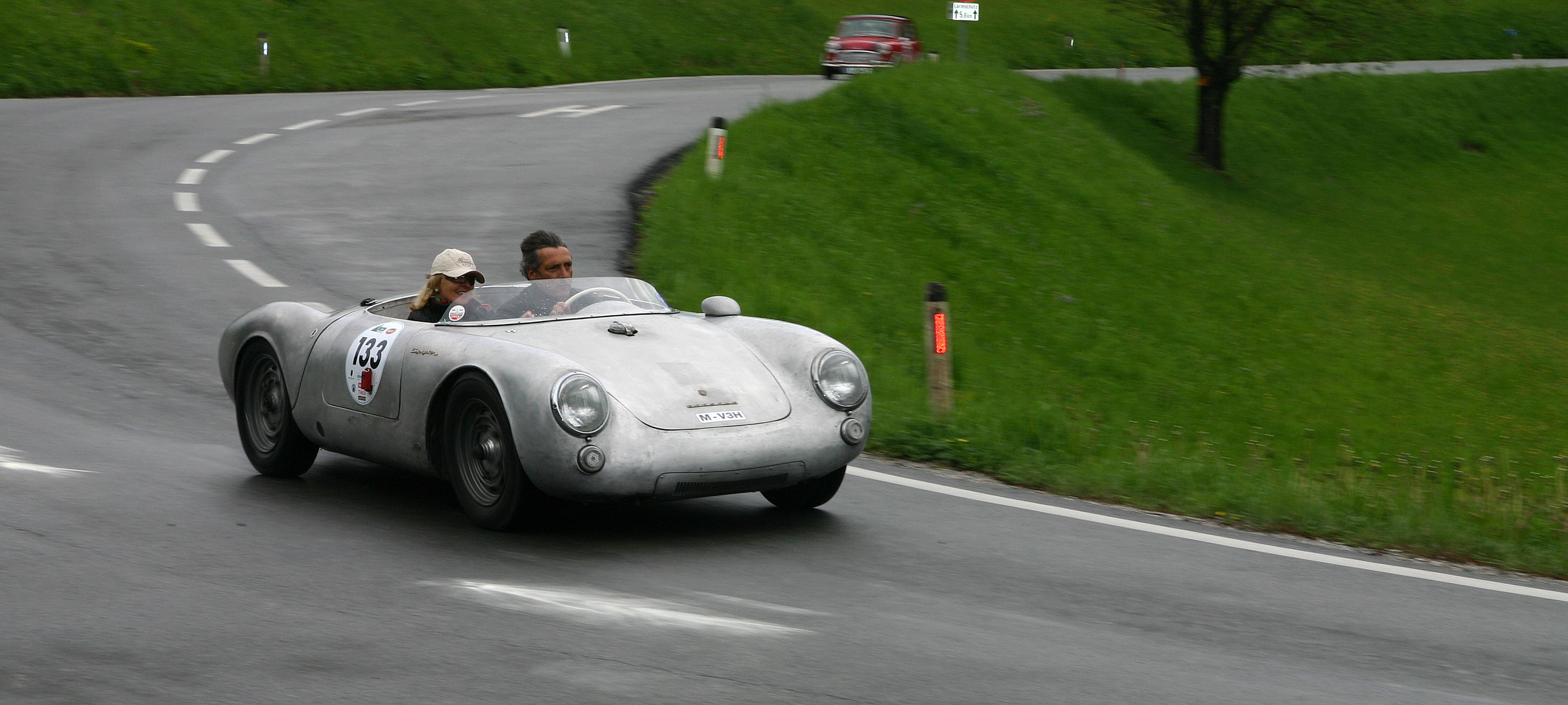
Porsche 550 Spyder

Erwin Komenda (6 April 1904 - 22 August 1966) was an Austrian automobile designer and Porsche employee, and a lead contributor to the design of the bodies for the VW Beetle and various Porsche sports cars.

Erwin Komenda was born on 6 April 1904 in Jauern am Semmering. His father, Franz Komenda, was the technical director of the first power station on the Semmering and in Weyer / Enns, where the family relocated in 1913. From 1916 to 1920 he attended a higher technical institute for iron processing in Steyr. From 1920 to 1926 he worked as an automotive designer in the "Wiener Karosseriefabrik" and completed the bodywork design course at Josef Feldwabel in the Vienna Technological Museum of Commerce. From 1926 to 1929 he was a designer in the Steyr works. Here he met Ferdinand Porsche for the first time, who came to Steyr as Technical Director after leaving Daimler-Benz AG. From 1929 to 1931 he was chief designer of the experimental and body development department of Daimler-Benz AG in Sindelfingen. During this time, cars such as the Mercedes-Benz Mannheim 370 K were built with a remarkably weight-saving new design, equipped with Steyr technology from the Steyr XXX: "swinging-axle suspension, independent suspension, braking systems". Also a streamlined small car with rear engine was developed.

In November 1931, Komenda joined the engineering office newly founded by Ferdinand Porsche as head of the bodywork design department, which he headed until 1966. Among other projects, he developed the body of the VW beetle. With more than 21.5 million units, the VW Beetle became the best-selling automobile of the 20th century. With graduate engineer Josef Mickl, a Porsche employee specializing in aircraft construction and aerodynamics, Komenda developed the bodywork of the P-Auto Union racing car and Cisitalia racing car. As early as 1946 Komenda began work on the body of the first Porsche sports car. He developed the body of the Porsche 356, various following types and the Porsche 550 Spyder. As a responsible Porsche engineer, he led the Stuttgart-based company into the next generation, accompanying and supervising the bodywork production of the Porsche 901, which was further developed into the 911. One of his latest projects was the development of the plastic body of the 904 race car. Komenda's last phase of life was marked by in-house difficulties with Porsche family members during the development of the Porsche 911. Erwin Komenda died on 22 August 1966. He was an active employee at Porsche until his early, sudden death. His life ended with the development of the Porsche 911.
