= Dannenhauer & Stauss =

German coachbuilder

Coordinates: 48.77263°N 9.16908°E

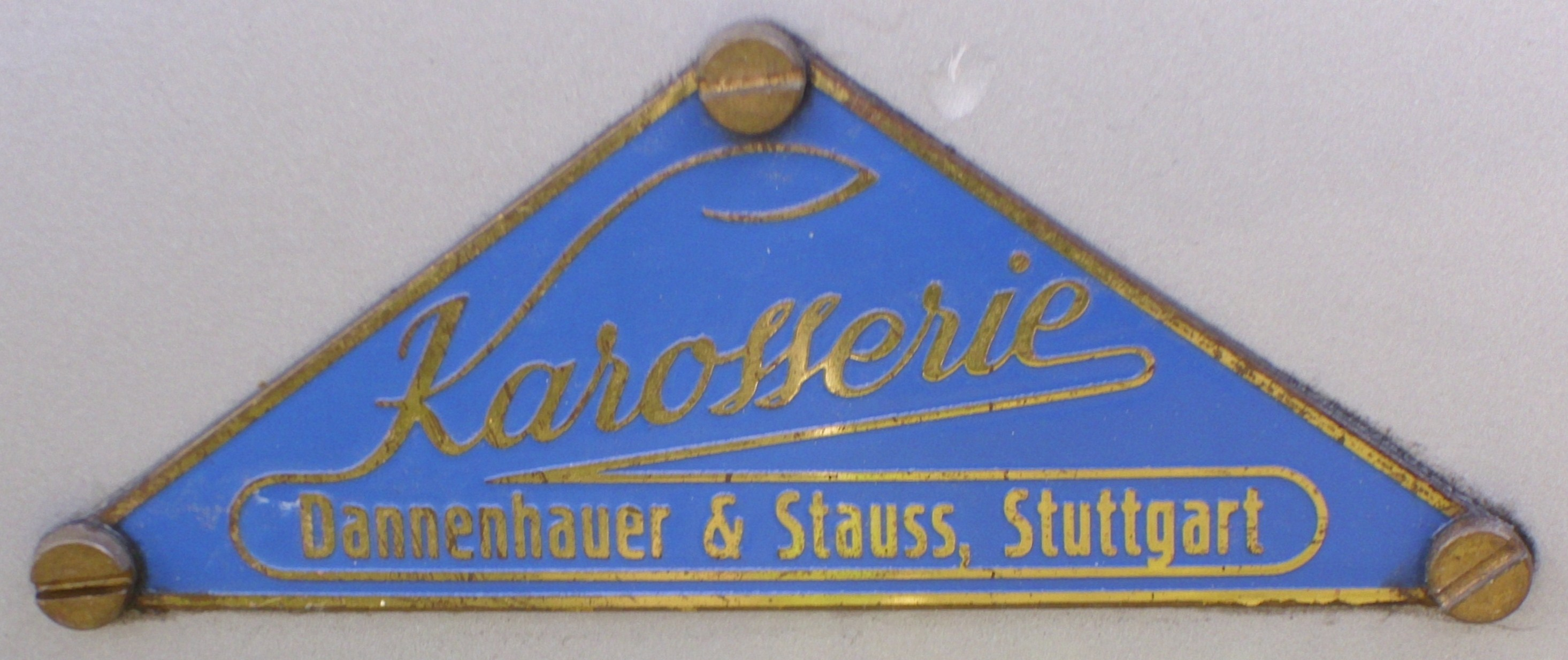
Logo

Dannenhauer & Stauss was founded by Gottfried Dannenhauer, a German coachbuilder. He had been employed by Karosseriewerk Reutter based in Stuttgart. Whilst there, he was communicating with Volkswagen before World War II. From 1950 to 1957, Dannenhauer & Stauss manufactured about 100 convertibles, mostly based on the Volkswagen Beetle. The sales price was 8,892 DM. The body was handmade by tapping metal sheets on a template. Other companies like DKW were supplied. When in 1955 the Karmann Ghia was mass-produced, the company could no longer compete, and its product was discontinued. The amount of production was limited, but precise numbers are uncertain. Changing their business model to rebuilding vehicle bodies allowed the company to survive at the address in Augustenstraße, Stuttgart where Reutter had been.

About 15 of the DKW Monza cars were made by Dannenhauer & Stauss. Ostensibly, a grand total of about 80 of the DKW Monza cars were made, albeit by different companies.

== Gallery ==
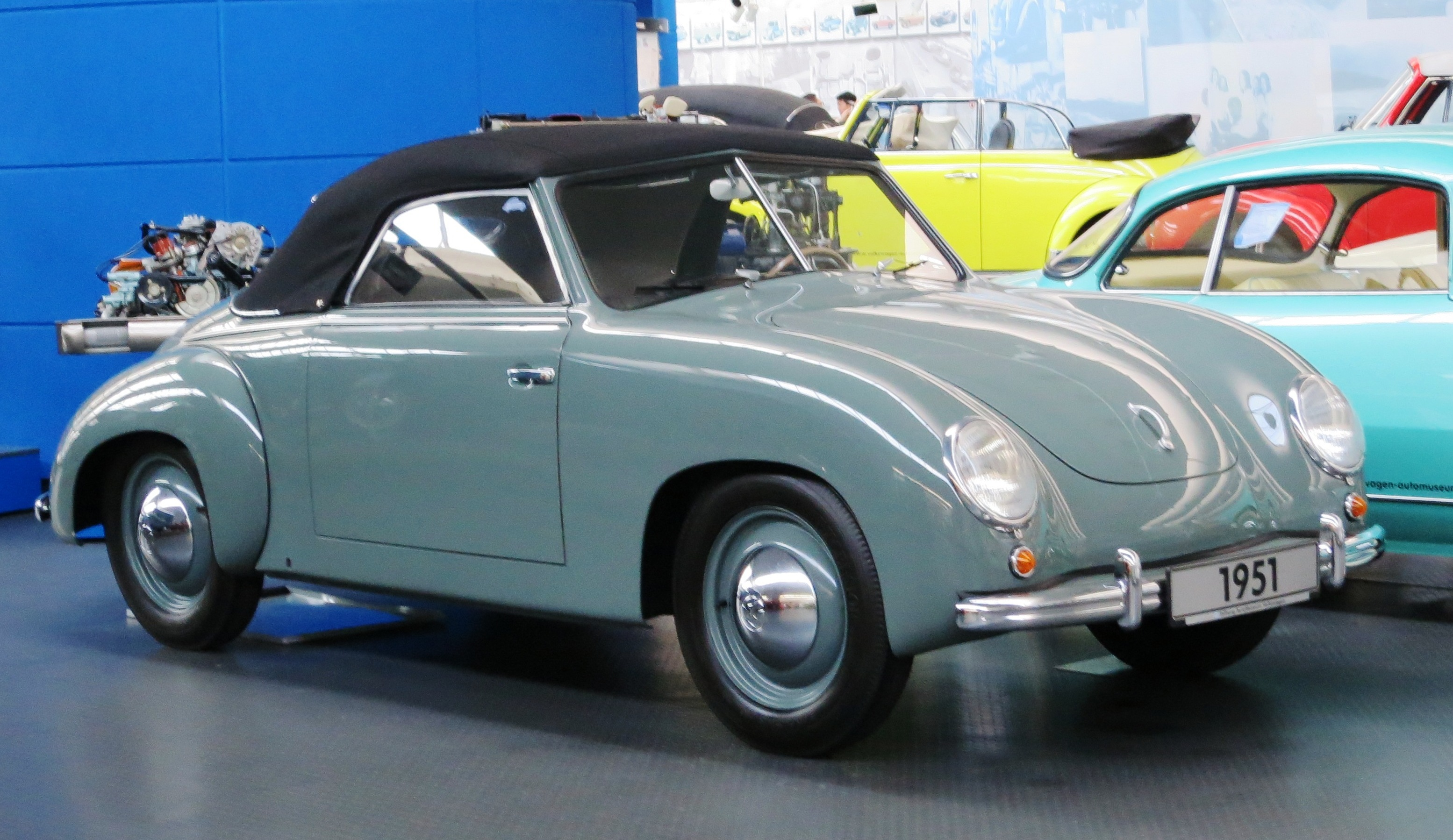
1951 Dannenhauer & Stauss Cabriolet in the AutoMuseum Volkswagen

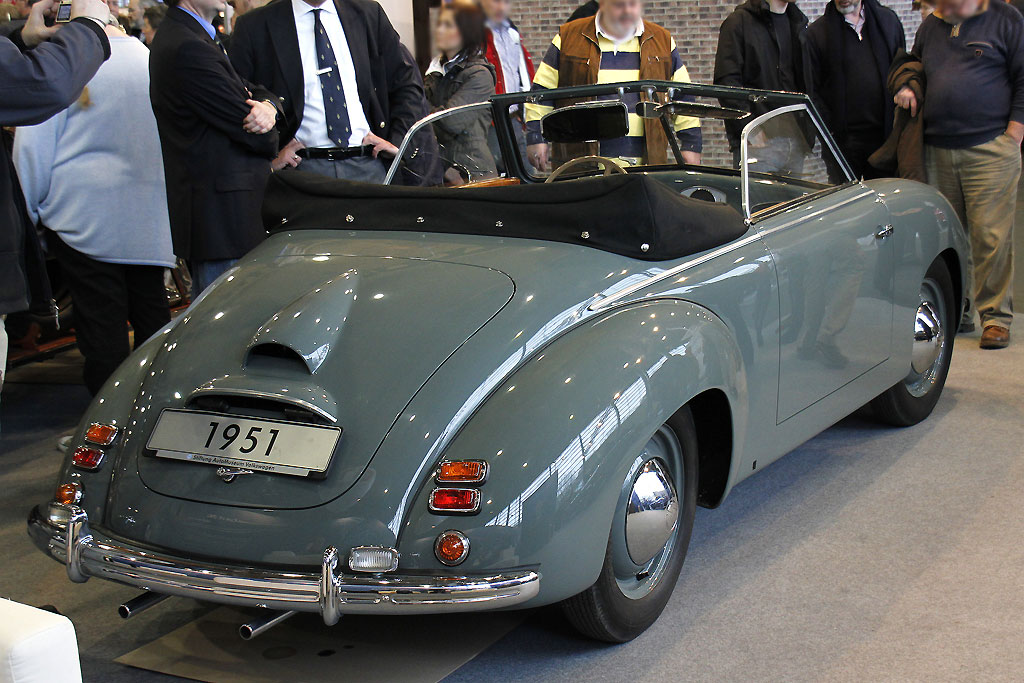
1951 Dannenhauer & Stauss Cabriolet rear

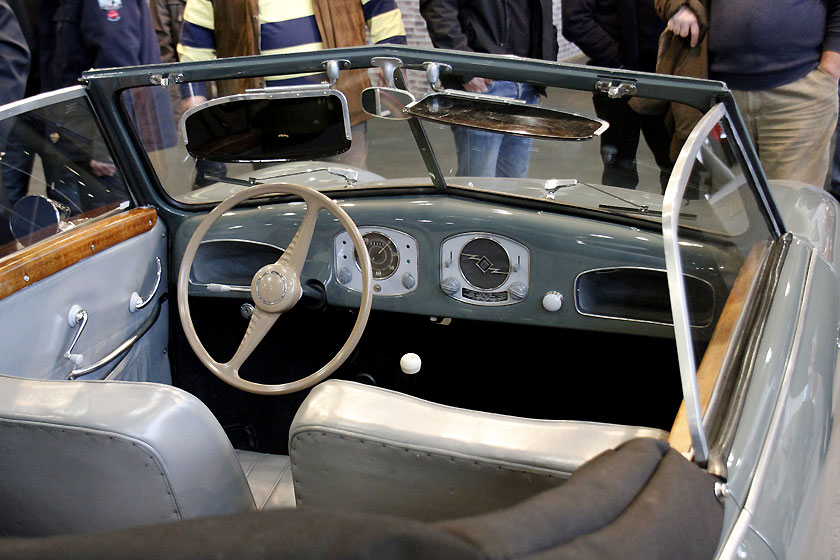
1951 Dannenhauer & Stauss Cabriolet interior

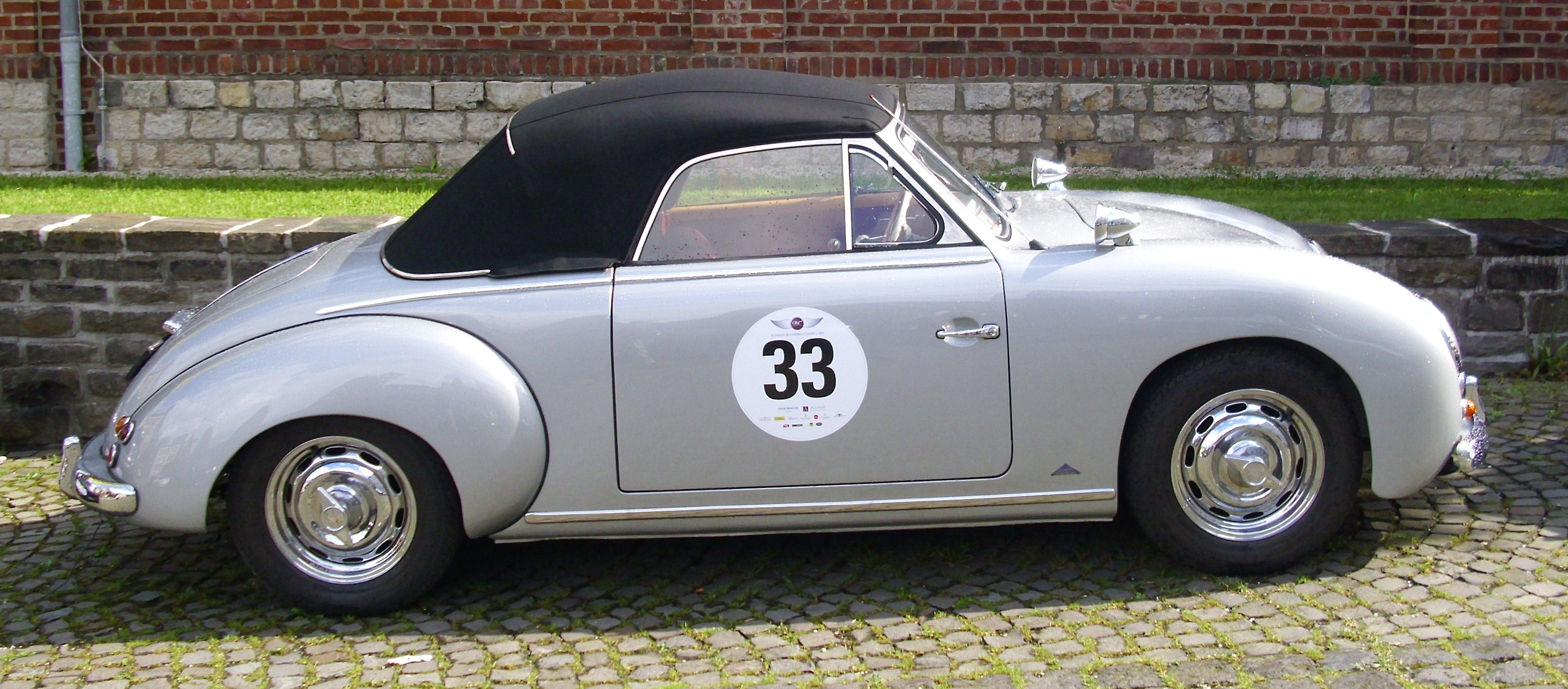
1954 Dannenhauer & Stauss Cabriolet
