= Porsche 911 (classic) =

Sports car, first and second generations of the Porsche 911

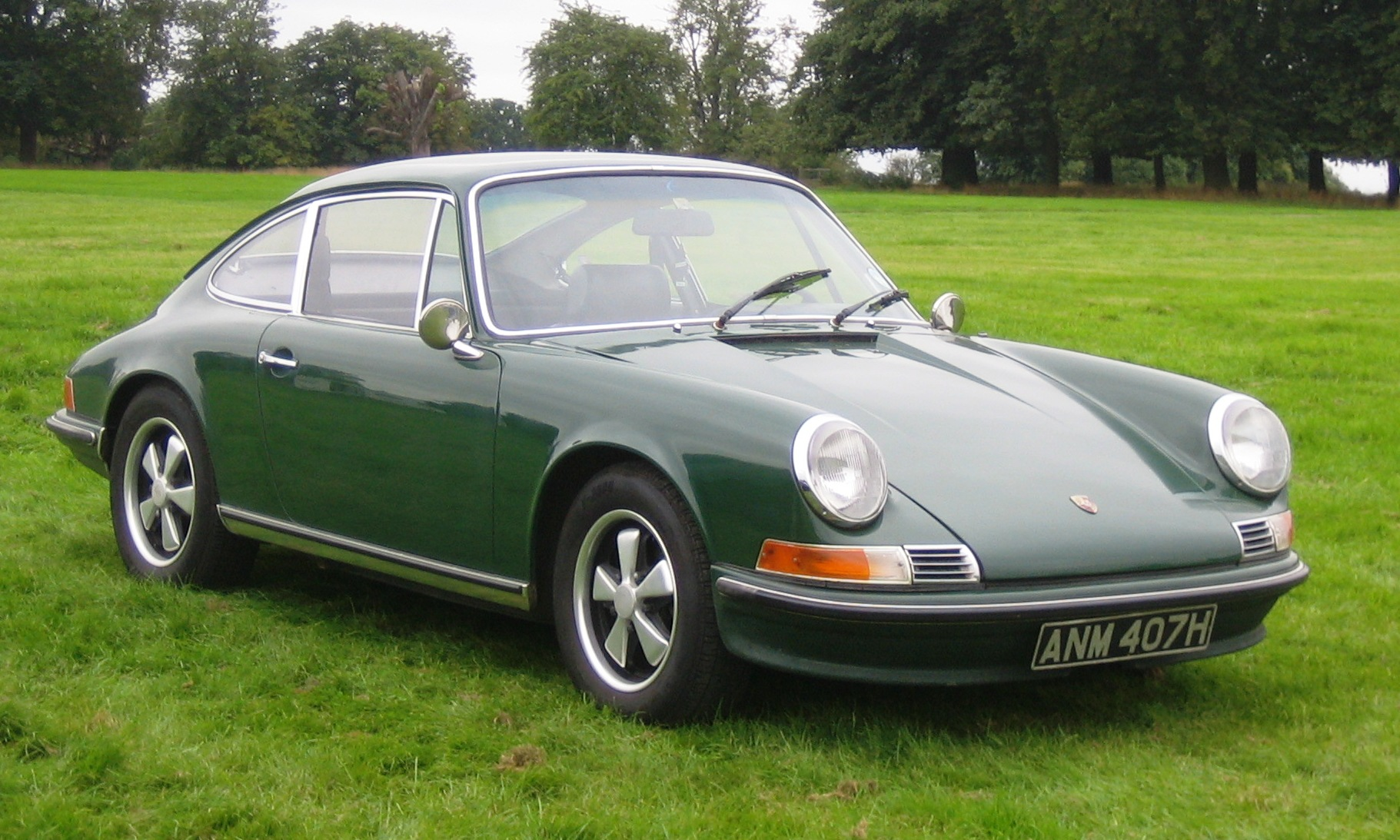
- 1970 Porsche 911E

Overview
- Manufacturer: Porsche AG
- Also called: Porsche 911 Carrera; Porsche Carrera
- Production: 1964–1989
- Assembly: West Germany: Stuttgart, Zuffenhausen
- Designer: Ferdinand Alexander Porsche, Erwin Komenda

Body and chassis
- Class: Sports car
- Body style: 2-door coupé 2-door Targa top (1966–1989); 2-door convertible (1982–1989)
- Layout: Rear-engine, rear-wheel drive
- Related: Porsche 912; Porsche 930; Porsche 959

Powertrain
- Engine: 2.0 L air-cooled H6; 2.2 L air-cooled H6; 2.3 L air-cooled H6; 2.7 L air-cooled H6; 3.0 L air-cooled H6; 3.2 L air-cooled H6; 3.0 L air-cooled turbo H6; 3.3 L air-cooled turbo H6
- Transmission: 5-speed manual; 4-speed semi-automatic; 4-speed manual

Dimensions
- Wheelbase: 2,211–2,268 mm (87.0–89.3 in)
- Length: 4,290 mm (168.9 in)
- Width: 1,700–1,780 mm (66.9–70.1 in)
- Height: 1,300–1,310 mm (51.2–51.6 in)

Chronology
- Predecessor: Porsche 356
- Successor: Porsche 964

The original Porsche 911 (pronounced nine eleven, German: Neunelfer) is a sports car made by Porsche AG of Stuttgart, Germany. A prototype of the design was shown to the public in autumn 1963. Production began in September 1964 and continued through 1989. It was succeeded by a modified version, internally referred to as Porsche 964 but still sold as Porsche 911, as are current models.

Mechanically, the 911 was notable for being rear engined and air-cooled. From its inception, the 911 was modified both by private teams and the factory itself for racing, rallying and other types of automotive competition. The original 911 series is often cited as the most successful competition car ever, especially when its variations are included, mainly the powerful 911-derived 935 which won 24 Hours of Le Mans and other major sports cars races outright against prototypes.

== Prototyping ==
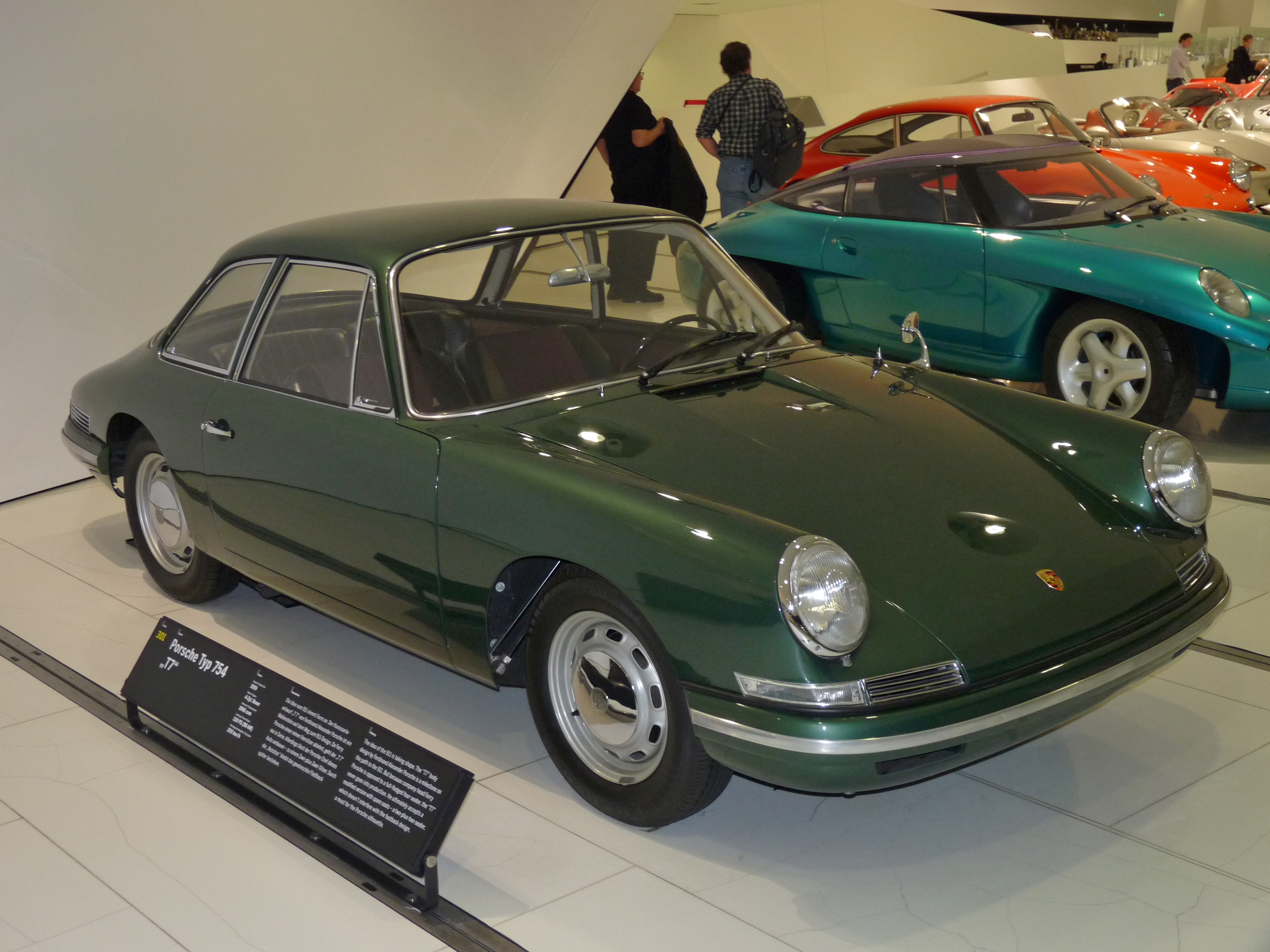
Porsche 695/754 (T7 body) at Porsche Museum

To update the style and utility of the 356B's T5 body, T7 body styling/design project was led by Butzi Porsche by applying modified style and 100mm longer wheelbase to 356B Karmann hardtop in 1959–1960. Another design/engineering project, T6 body, led by Erwin Komenda, including a bigger front trunk and rear engine compartment opening, bigger rear window, and twin grilles on the engine lid, was progressing alongside. The T6 debuted in 1962 as a facelift on 356B without the longer wheelbase or the 911-like front and rear style of the T7.

The increase in body length was used on the T7 prototype for the rear '+2' passenger room making the body a full(er) four-seater, not for additional space for a six cylinder engine as it, as well as the T6, was a 356 body style candidate. The T7 body was completed into a drivable prototype with a pushrod 1600 Super (1582cc 75hp Typ 616/12) engine as Typ 695.
In 1962–63, the 695's engine was swapped with 2L four cylinder DOHC engine of 356B Carrera GS (1968cc 130hp Typ 587/1) and became Typ 754, that served as a benchmark in comparisons against Typ 901 prototypes.

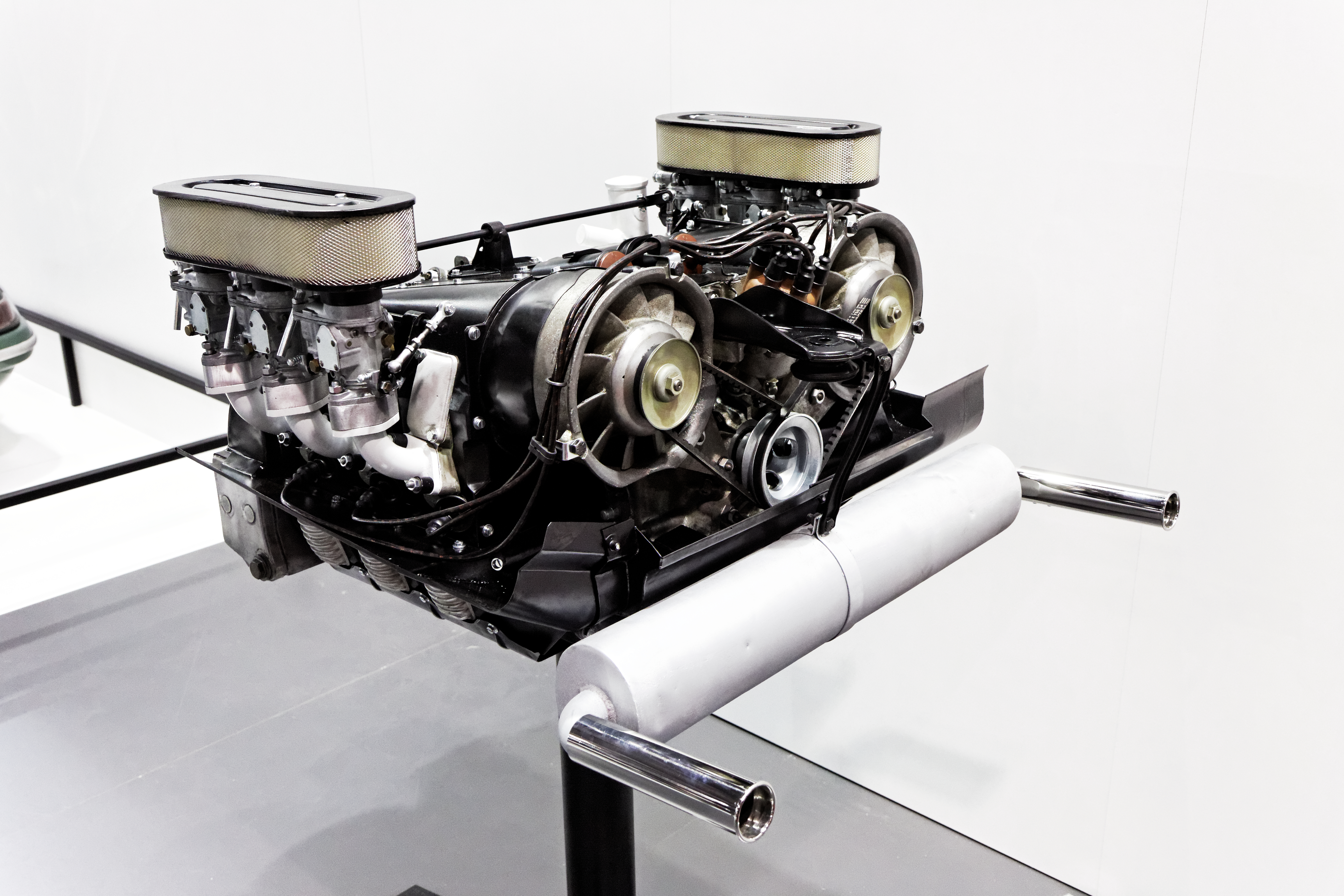
Rear view of Typ 745 engine, showing the characteristic twin-fan configuration.

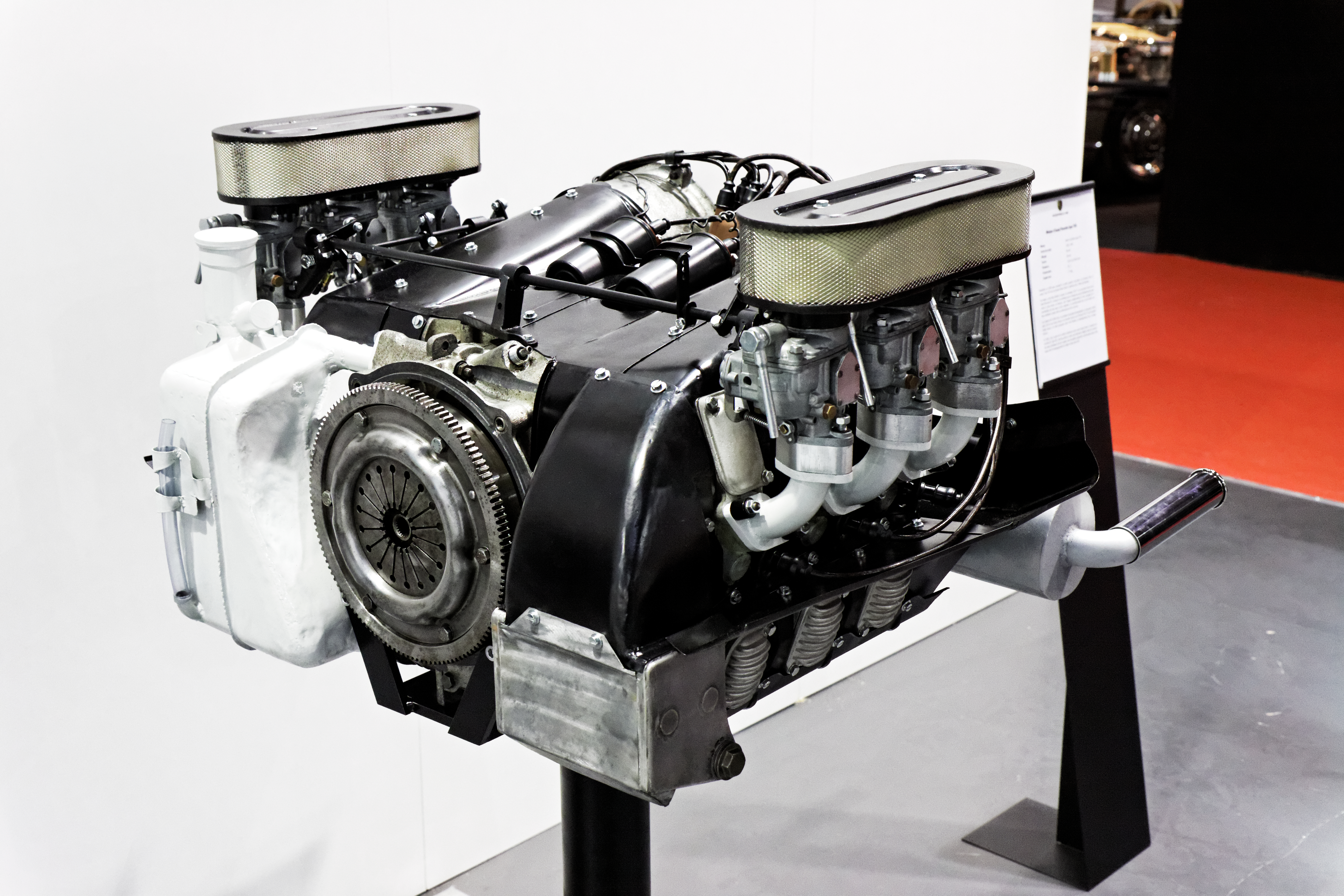
Front view of Typ 745 engine, with the dry-sump oil tank as a part of the engine assembly.

Klaus von Rücker and Leopold Jäntschke led the team, including a young Hans Mezger and Ferdinand Piëch, to develop the 2 litre six cylinder engine that was numbered the Typ 745 with intake camshaft above, and exhaust camshaft below the crankshaft (Note: Instead of the 356's single camshaft below the crankshaft, operating both intake and exhaust valves via pushrods.) to operate horizontal pushrods in an unusual dry-sump configuration. Ferry Porsche, having experiences on DOHC racing engines, did not like this arrangement in the air-cooled six cylinder pushrod engine as it did not have sufficient benefit to justify the increase in the number of camshafts. Also, the new twin vertical (horizontal axis) fans on this "2.0 litre 6 cylinder prototype engine (Porsche type 745)". were found to suffice with only one vertical fan in the development, as this cast-aluminium 11-wing-blade design utilising a 12V AC alternator as the drive shaft (developed on racing engines with then-new fibre-glass shroud) was much more efficient than the Volkswagen-style flat-plate fabricated fin scirocco fan (in front of a DC generator) of Typ 502/506/508/527/528/531/532/546/557/589/616 engines for the 356.

So the 745 engine was abandoned and the 2 litre air-cooled SOHC (two camshafts on a flat six engine) 'wet-sump' six cylinder boxer Typ 821 engine was drafted and prototyped with a single vertical fan. Although wet-sump was the norm for Porsche production engines, Ferdinand Piëch strongly argued for dry-sump of the 745 that could give a lower center of gravity through lower position of the engine/crankshaft in the car as well as a straight adaptability to racing. (Note: In racing conditions, oil pickup in a wet-sump pan often fails to scavenge oil due to a high G under braking and in corners, resulting in no oil pressure and a broken engine. The same scavenge issue also occurs in a dry-sump system, but the oil supply to the pressure pump is provided from a separate oil tank, ensuring uninterrupted oil pressure.) Ferry Porsche agreed with this Piëch opinion and the dry-sump Typ 901 engine was born with a single intermediary shaft below the crankshaft (which also drives the oil scavenge and pressure pumps mounted inside the crankcase) that drives two single-stage single-row chains, in turn, driving a camshaft in each of the two cam-carriers on six cylinder-heads.

After the size and configuration of 80 mm (3.15 in) bore x 66 mm (2.60 in) stroke, 1,991 cc Typ 901 engine with Solex 40PI carburettors (Note: This single choke down draft carbrettor (six of them were used with elaborate throttle linkage) is unique in not having a float in what is normally a float chamber. Instead, it has an overflow port in the fuel chamber to keep the fuel level constant, with an additional (to the regular Bendix electric fuel pump) fuel pump driven by the camshaft to scavenge the overflow and recirculate it to the fuel tank.) were more or less finalised, Butzi Porsche led a team to merge the front and rear style of the T7 body with the size requirements of the six cylinder dry-sump engine, as well as other new components including Typ 901 four/five-speed transaxle, rack and pinion steering, MacPherson strut front suspension, and semi-trailing arm rear suspension to come up with the T8 body. Erwin Komenda was responsible in the chassis design to incorporate the new components. The resultant Typ 901 chassis/body ended up being 70mm narrower and 120mm longer than the production T5/T6 body of the 356B/C, with a 111mm longer wheelbase.

This car was introduced to the world as "Porsche 901" at the 1963 Internationale Automobil-Ausstellung (Frankfurt Motor Show) on 12 September 1963. However, Peugeot protested because it had exclusive rights in France to car names formed by three numbers with a zero in the middle. Instead of selling the new model with a different name in France, Porsche changed the model name to "911" for all markets, but the engine designation and parts number prefix remained '901'. A total of 82 cars (The factory retained chassis #01, 02 and 03. Chassis number 13 was skipped and became #14.) were built as model "901" before the production switched over to the "911" marking on the engine lid, and it went on sale as "Porsche 911" in 1964.

== 2.0-litre / O, A and B series (1964–1969) ==
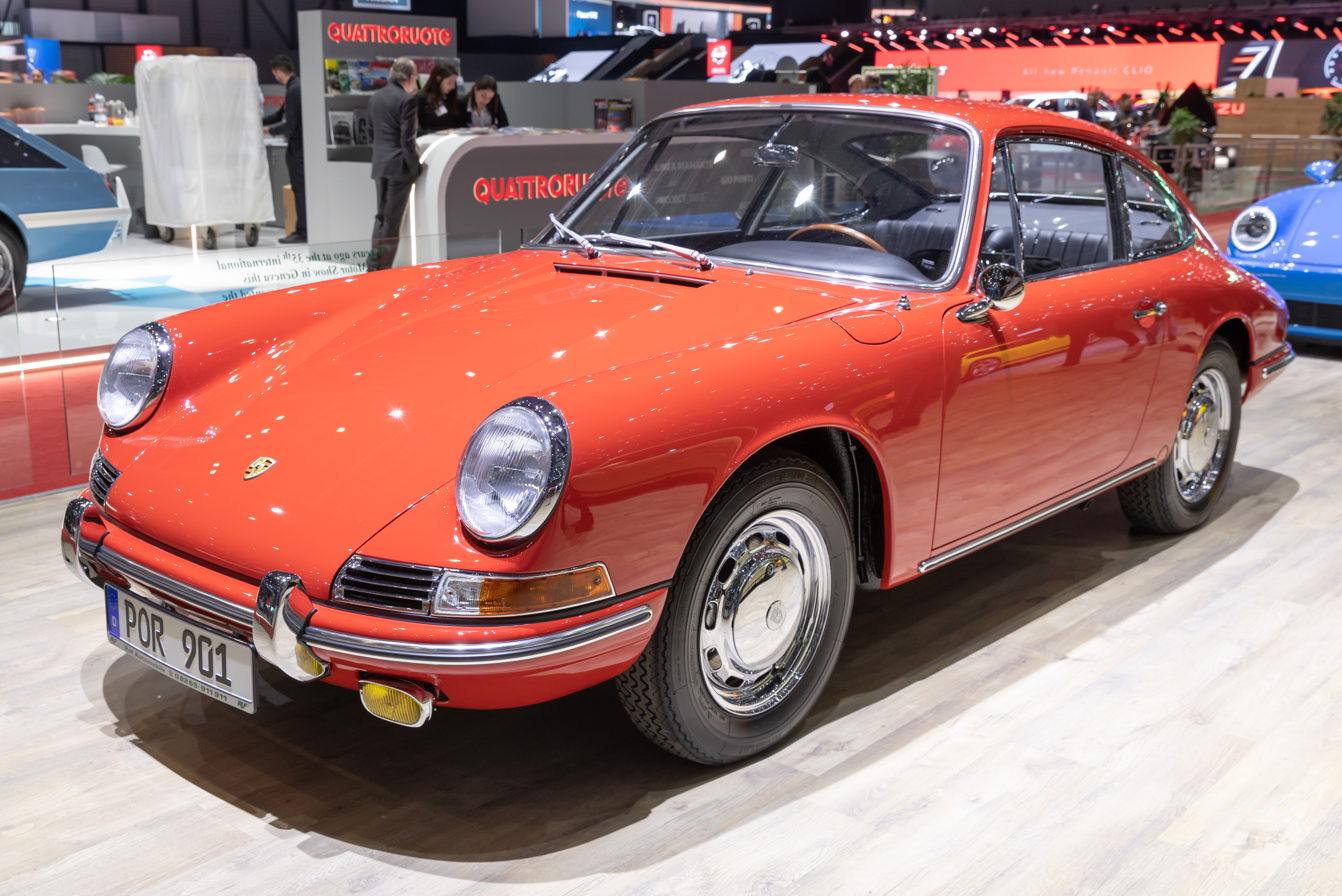
One of the first 82 production Type 901 (Note: Note the elongated fuel filler door. This door was round-shaped on the prototypes built. Also the Porsche crest on hubcaps, moulding under the door, and bumper overriders were last-minute additions.)

The initial series became known as the O series, produced until July 1967, and the MY1968 911s as the A series, followed by the MY1969 B series. These earliest editions of the 911 had Typ 901/01 an air-cooled, rear-mounted, all-aluminium-alloy, 2.0 L (1,991 cc) 130 PS (96 kW) SOHC flat-six boxer engine, which has almost no parts interchangeability to the 356's four-cylinder pushrod 1.6L, or the 2.0L DOHC unit. It was mated to a five-speed manual "Type 901" transmission. The car had 2+2 seating, though the rear was very small, like the 356. The styling was by Ferdinand "Butzi" Porsche, son of Ferdinand "Ferry" Porsche. Erwin Komenda, the leader of the Porsche car body construction department, was responsible for the engineering aspects of the new chassis/body, incorporating the new engine, transmission, steering, and suspension into the monocoque.

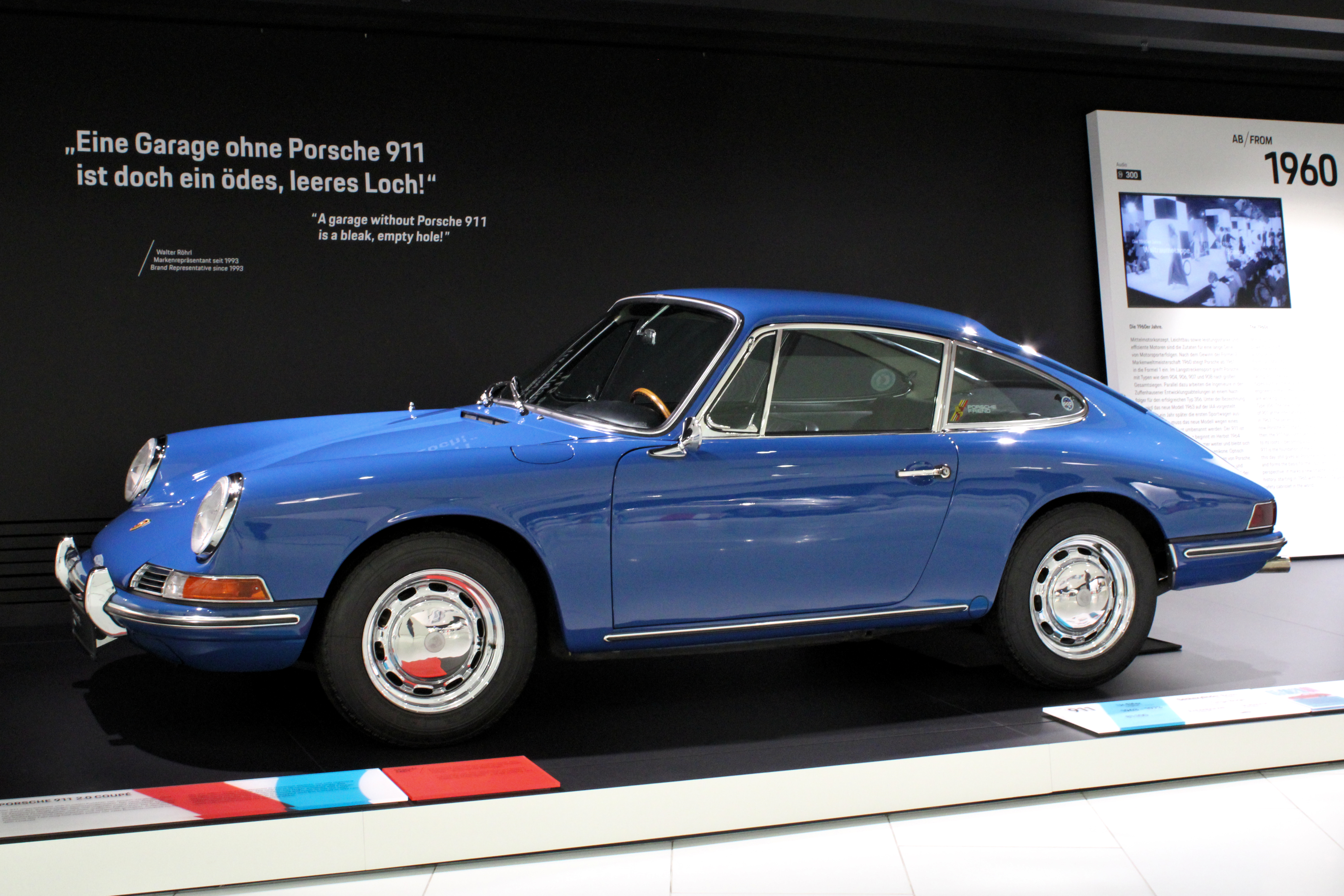
A 1965 Porsche 911 2.0 Coupe inside the Porsche Museum

In mid-1966, the 901/01 engine (9.0:1 compression ratio, Solex 40PI) was changed to Typ 901/05 with two Weber 40IDA3C carburettors (3 choke/barrel, with two fuel needle valves and two floats each). For the model year (MY)1967, Porsche introduced the more powerful 911S (901/02 160 PS (118 kW) at 6,600 rpm, 9.8:1 compression ratio, Weber 40IDA3C carburettor). Forged 911R-style alloy wheels from Fuchs, in a distinctive 5-leaf design, were offered for the first time, which coincided with the 911S debut. In 1967, 210 PS (154 kW) racing version Typ 901/20 (Weber 46IDA3C) twin-plug engine was developed and used in the Porsche 904/6, 911R, and 906 (Carrera 6) racing models.

A semi-automatic (clutchless manual) Sportomatic model, composed of a torque converter, electrically-switched and pneumatically operated clutch, and a conventional four-speed manual transmission, was added to 911L (901/04, Weber 40IDA3C) as an option for MY1967.

The 911L was also fitted with the ventilated brake discs from the S model and was the top version available in North America (901/14 for manual, 901/17 for Sportomatic in Canada/US), where the 911S could not meet emission requirements.

The Targa version, with a stainless steel-clad roll bar, appeared also for MY1967. Porsche feared the U.S. National Highway Traffic Safety Administration (NHTSA) would outlaw fully open convertibles, an important market for the 356. It was equipped with a removable roof panel and a removable plastic rear window (a fixed glass version was offered alongside from MY1968).
The name "Targa" – plate or plaque in Italian – came from the Targa Florio road race in Sicily, in which Porsche had scored seven victories since 1956, with four more to come through 1973. This last in the subsequently discontinued event is especially notable as it was won with a production 911 Carrera RS (F series) against prototypes entered by Italian factories of Ferrari and Alfa Romeo.

The 110 PS (81 kW) 911T, for "Touring", was launched in October 1967 with Typ 901/03 engine (Weber 40IDA3C), the only engine in the history of 911 without counter-weights on the crankshaft. The T effectively replaced the 912, while the staple 130 PS (96 kW) model was made slightly more upscale and renamed the 911L (for "Luxus", with Weber 40IDA3C, ventilated disc brakes, and heated rear window glass; 901/06 engine for manual, 901/04 for Sportomatic).

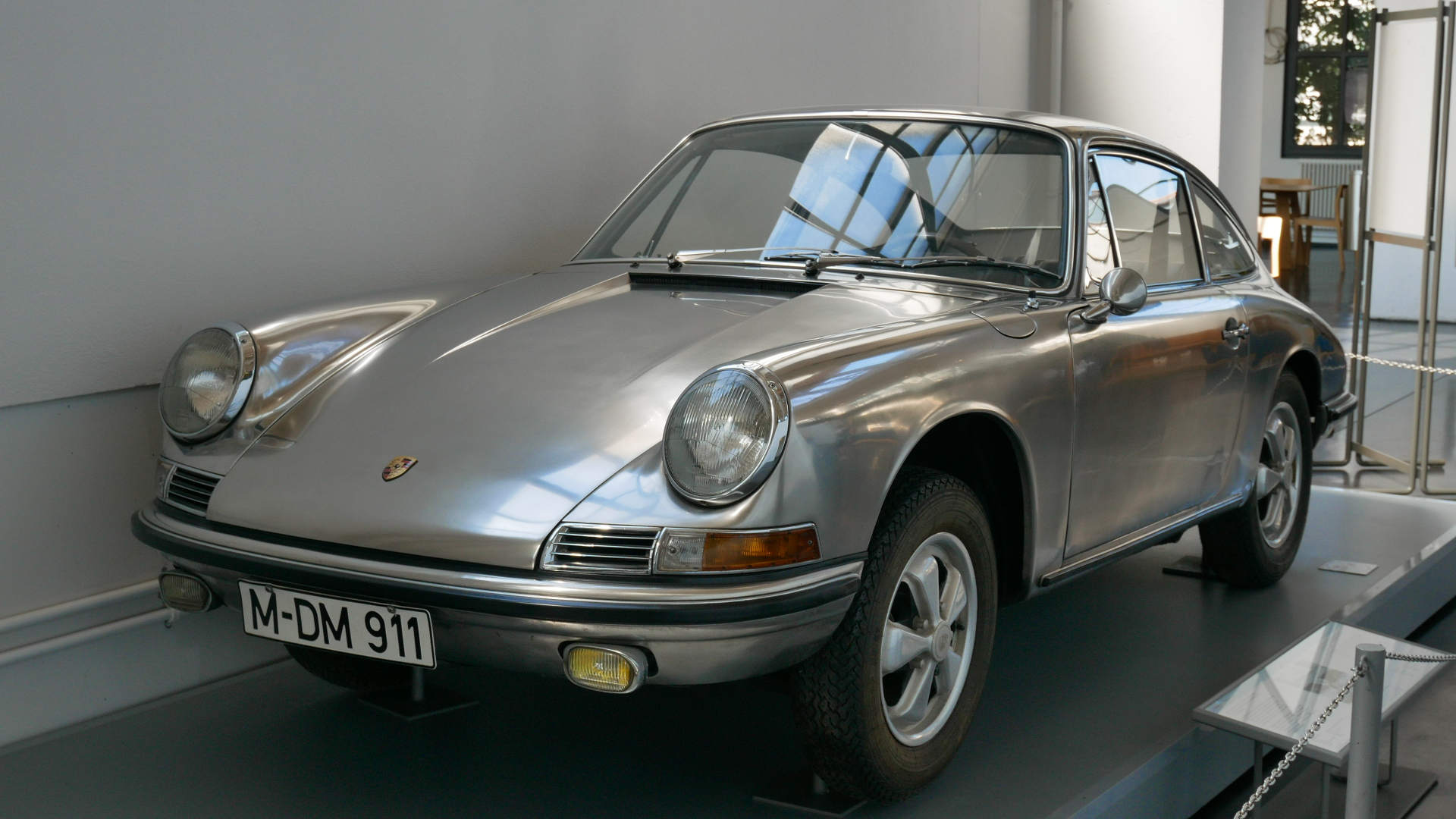
1967 Prototype Porsche 911 bodied in stainless steel at the Deutsches Museum.

In MY1968, 911T switched over to 901/13 (Weber 40IDT3C, with counter-weights, 110 PS (81 kW) for the manual), while 911S and 911T became available with Sportomatic (901/08 160hp at 6,600 rpm with Weber 40IDS3C for 911S, and 901/12, Weber 40IDT3C, with counter-weights and 110hp for 911T). 911L engine switched from 901/04 to Typ 901/07 for Sportomatic (with the same Weber 40IDA3C and 130 PS (96 kW)) at the same time.

For MY1969, the new B series was introduced, which moved the rear wheels on all 911 models 57 mm aft, increasing wheelbase from 2,211 to 2,268 mm (87.0 to 89.3 in) without lengthening the body, to remedy the car's oversteer tendencies at the limit. Also for MY1969, Kugelfischer/Bosch mechanical fuel injection (MFI) with a plunger-type fuel pump/distributor (Note: The initial model with a single row of six distributor exits was soon replaced by the models with two rows of 3 exits on top of the pump. Each MFI pump model is calibrated for the type of cylinderhead/camshaft used, i.e. T/E/S/RS/RSR, etc.) driven by the left camshaft via a toothed belt, 6 fuel injectors, and 6 throttle butterflies, arrived both for the 911S (901/10, 170 PS (125 kW)), and a new middle model, the 911E (901/09 for manual and 901/11 for Sportomatic, both with 140 PS (103 kW)), which replaced the short-lived 911L.

=== 912 (1965–1968) ===
When 356 production came to an end in 1965, there was still a market for a four-cylinder car, particularly in the USA where the largest bulk of Porsches were sold. Porsche 902, a slightly downscaled 901 fitted with three-dial gauge cluster (911-style 5 dial as an option), a detuned version (Typ 616/36 engine, 90 PS (66 kW)) of the four-cylinder 356SC pushrod engine (Typ 616/16 95 PS (70 kW)), mated with four-speed Typ 901 transmission (with a five-speed as an option), and with silver-colour (as opposed to 911's gold-colour) 'PORSCHE' and '912' letterings on the engine lid, was introduced as Porsche 912 soon after the 911 for MY1965. In 1965, production averaged about 30 912s and 20 911s a day. The 912 was replaced by the 911T in 1968.

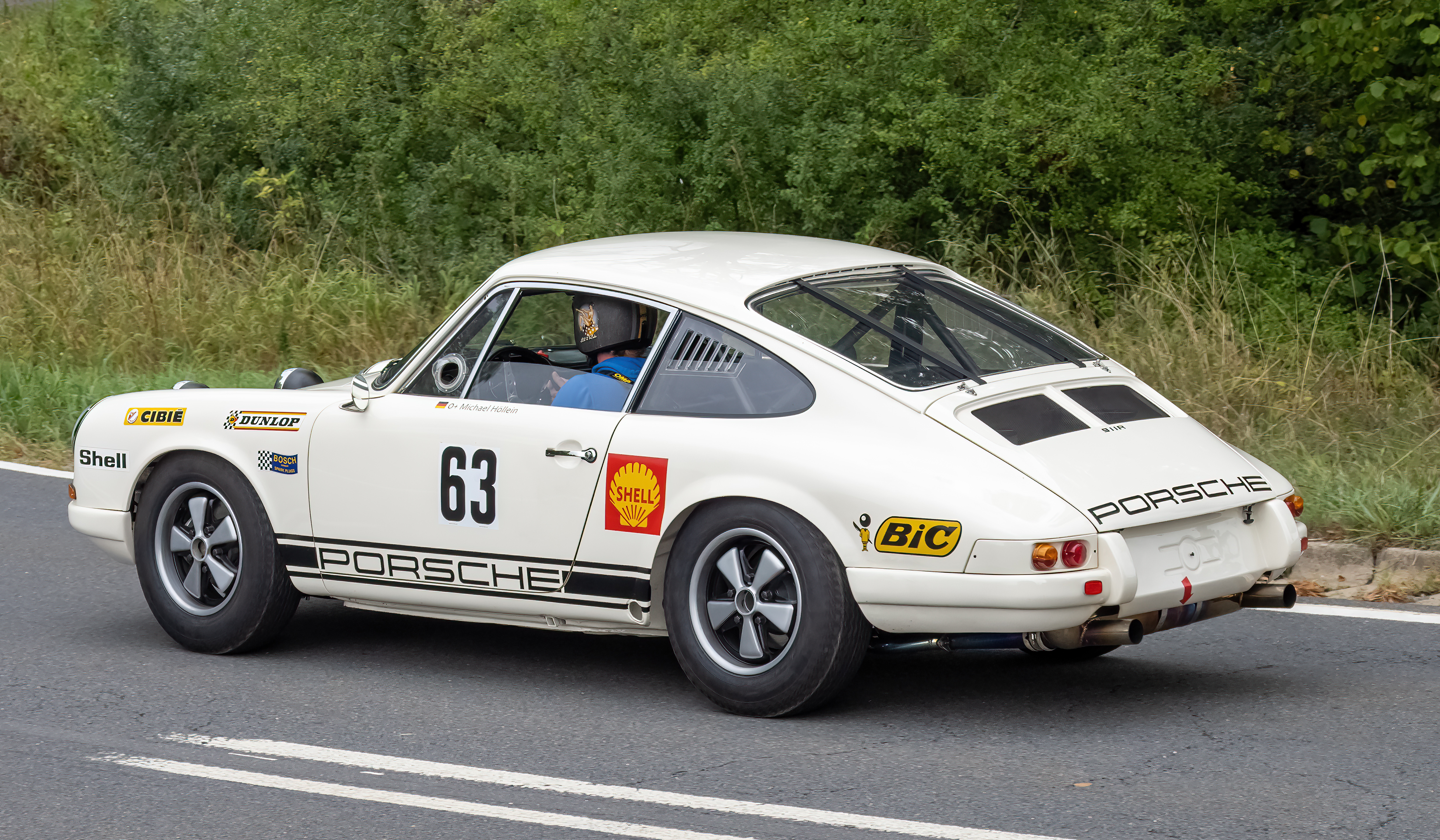
Porsche 911R in period racing livery

=== 911R (1967) ===
The 911R, a lightweight racing version with thin aluminium doors, plastic door handles, smaller front and rear indicator lights, spartan interior with a bucket seat and a smaller-diameter steering wheel, magnesium-alloy crankcase, twin-spark cylinder heads, and a power output of 210 PS (154 kW), with 810kg weight, had a very limited production of just 20 cars in 1967. The production volume did not meet the FIA GT class production car requirement, so it competed against purpose-built prototype class racing machines. The forged 6" x 15" wheels made by Fuchs as a racing part for 911R became optional equipment for production 911s. Weber 46IDA3C carburettor and twin ignition with a 12-terminal distributor on this SOHC 2-valve racing engine (Typ 901/20, without a heat exchanger or heater ducts, with centrifugal advance in place of a vacuum advance on the distributor), along with fibreglass fuel tank, were passed on to later racing models including Porsche 906. The unique magnesium-alloy crankcase (in MY1969) and hydraulic cam chain tensioners (in MY1984) became standard equipment on all 911s in slightly different formats years later.

=== 911S/R (1967–1968), 911T/R (1968) ===
In order to compete in the "Group 3 GT" production based class, Porsche offered the "Rally Kit" for the 911S, and later for the 911T, in order to take advantage of the 911T lower homologated weight. They were built in low quantities to a range of specifications depending on their intended competition purposes. These cars are frequently referred to as 911S/R and 911T/R, but because they use the standard 911S and 911T as the homologation models, they are usually listed in official racing documentation as "911S" and "911T".

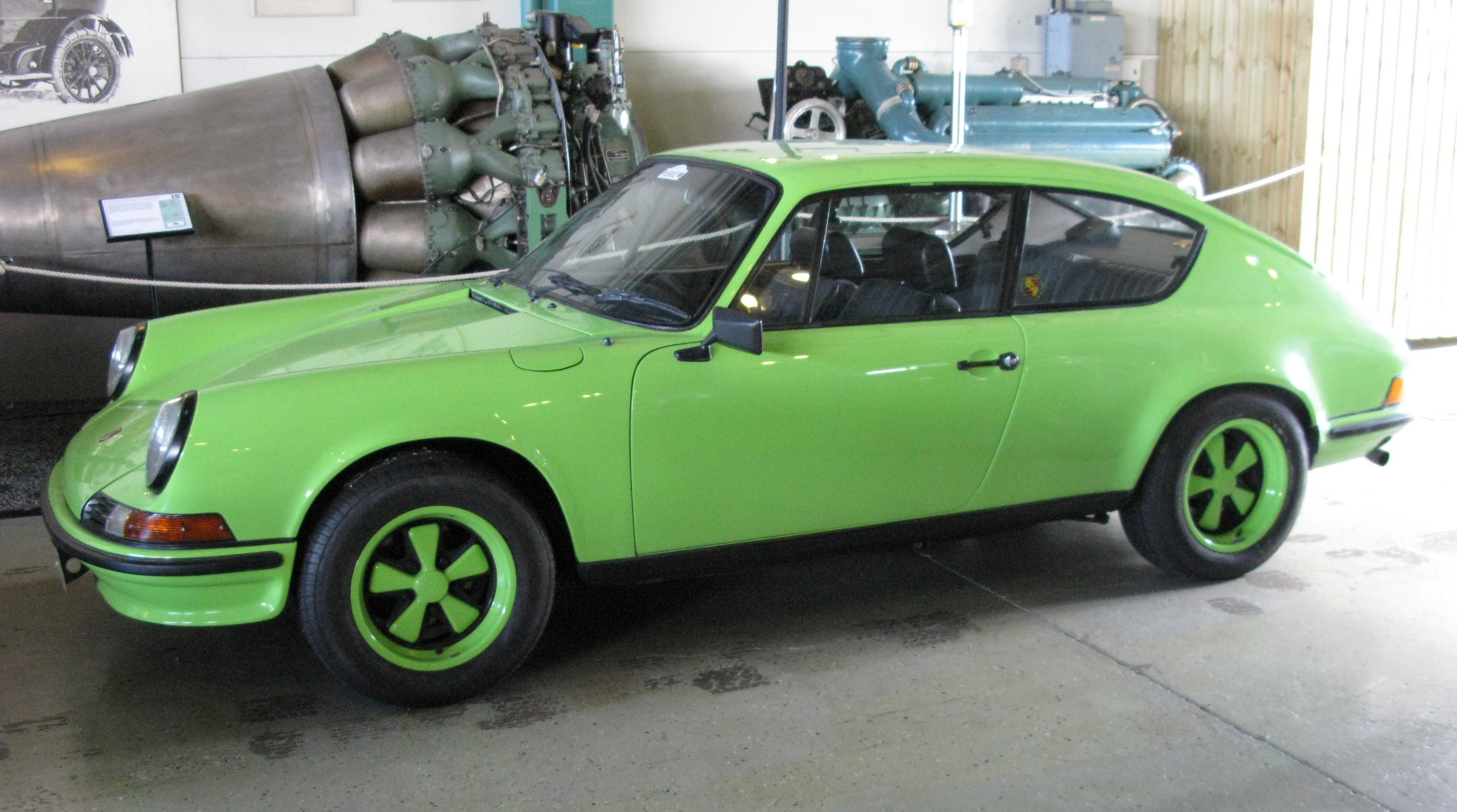
Porsche 911 B17 concept.

=== B17 (1969) ===
The 911 B17 is a concept designed by Pininfarina, which took a standard 911 and lengthened the wheelbase by 7.5 in (190 mm), resulting in a car that weighed almost 2,500 lb (1,100 kg).

== 2.2-litre / C and D series (1969–1971) ==
For model year 1970, the displacement of all 911 engines was increased to 2,195 cc (2.195 L; 133.9 cu in) with 84 mm bore x 66 mm stroke.

Power outputs were uprated to 125 PS (92 kW) in the 911T (911/03 engine, Zenith 40TIN), 155 PS (114 kW) in the 911E (911/01 MFI), and 180 PS (132 kW) in the 911S (911/02 MFI). The engines for Sportomatic were 911/06 (Zenith 40TIN) for the T, 911/04 (MFI) for the E, and 911/05 (MFI) for the S, all with the same power rating as the engines for manual transmission. For the Canada/US market, only 911T had market-specific 911/07 (125 PS (92 kW), Zenith 40TIN) for the manual, and 911/08 (125 PS (92 kW), Zenith 40TIN) for Sportomatic. These engines had a lighter magnesium-alloy crankcase, larger valves/ports, and stronger conrods.

The internal code for this C series, its 2.2L engines, and parts number prefix for the new parts were switched from "901" to "911", including the new Typ 911 transaxle with a larger 225mm diameter clutch. The body had aluminium engine lid, and hidden-from-sight pull levers on door handles, replacing the previous push buttons. CDI ignition and ventilated brake discs became standard for all models.

D series in MY1971 (from August 1970 production) added hot-dip zinc coating rust-proofing, side impact beam in the doors, central twist knob on the glove box lid, three-speed wipers with intermittent function (911T without intermittent), and the fuel pump behind the fuel tank was relocated to the left-rear of transmission. All the engines added oil squirters for the pistons on the crankcase and new sealed chain tensioners. Power windows became optional equipment for the first time.

The 912 was discontinued, with the 914 taking its place as Porsche's entry model.

Despite the lower maximum power output of the 911E compared to the 911S, the 911E was quicker during acceleration up to 160 km/h (99 mph), because the higher torque in the high rpm range of 911S was not enough to offset the higher torque in the low/mid rpm range of the 911E. Porsche factory team used 911E in rally events, where a wide power band is more advantageous, and the 911E was called the "Secret weapon from Zuffenhausen" by the amateur entrants who tended to buy the 911S, the only model on which "Rally Kit" option was initially available.

=== 911S/T ===
For racing purposes, the 911 S/T was produced in limited numbers, with uncertainty about the exact number (50 built in 1969–1972, or 33 built in 1970–1971). The defining feature of the 911S/T was the introduction of flared fenders - a future staple of the 911. Mismatched front-Fuchs and rear-Minilite wheels came as a result of Fuchs/Porsche not having a 9 x 15" wheel wide enough for the rear 4.75/10-15 tyres. The front wheels too were widened from the standard 6" to 7" with 4.30/11.3-15 tyres. The cars were available with a choice of 2,195 cc (907 engine, 270 PS (199 kW) at 8,500 rpm), 2,380 cc (911/21, 250 PS at 7,800 rpm), or 2,494 cc engines, with the largest unit (86.7mm bore x 70.4mm stroke, 911/70) producing 270 PS (199 kW) at 8,000 rpm. Weight was down to 960 kg (2,120 lb). Because the 911S/Ts were produced to order for racing purposes, no two 911S/T were the same; some used thinner gauge steel body panels and some used aluminum or fiberglass; some did not have the mismatched tyres, or used different sizes depending on the circuit and availability. The cars had success at the Daytona 6 Hours, the Sebring 12 Hours, the 1000 km Nürburgring and the Targa Florio.

=== C20 (1970) ===
The 911 C20 is a factory prototype in 1970, designed by Erwin Komenda, based on the standard 911 but lengthened by 13.6 in (345 mm) over the stock car (VIN # 9111120162).

== 2.4-litre / E and F series (1971–1973) ==
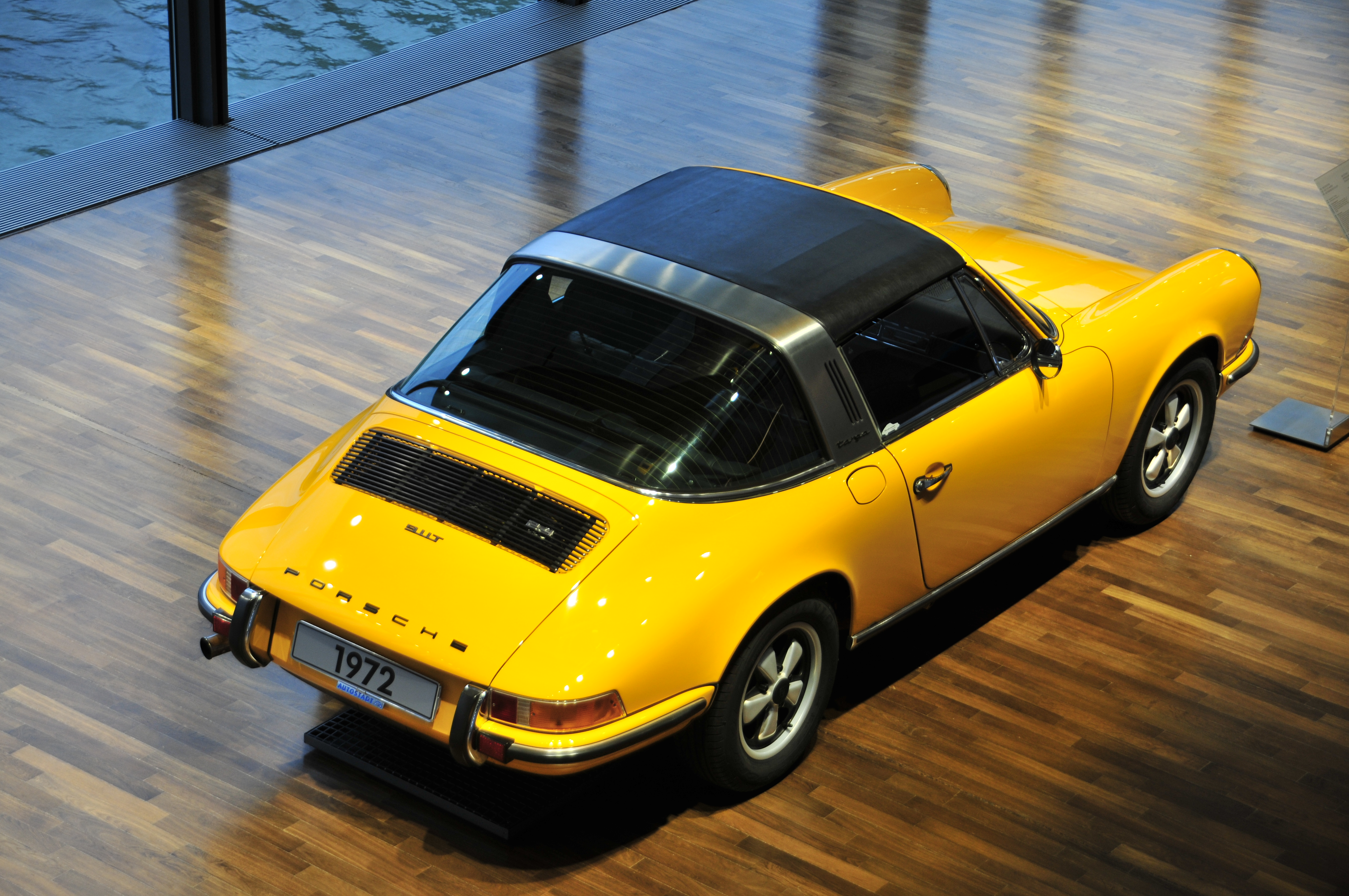
1972 Porsche 911 T Targa with removable roof. Notice the oil filler door on the rear right fender, which is only found on the 1972 model. The black engine-lid vent grille and letterings are 1973 model-year features.

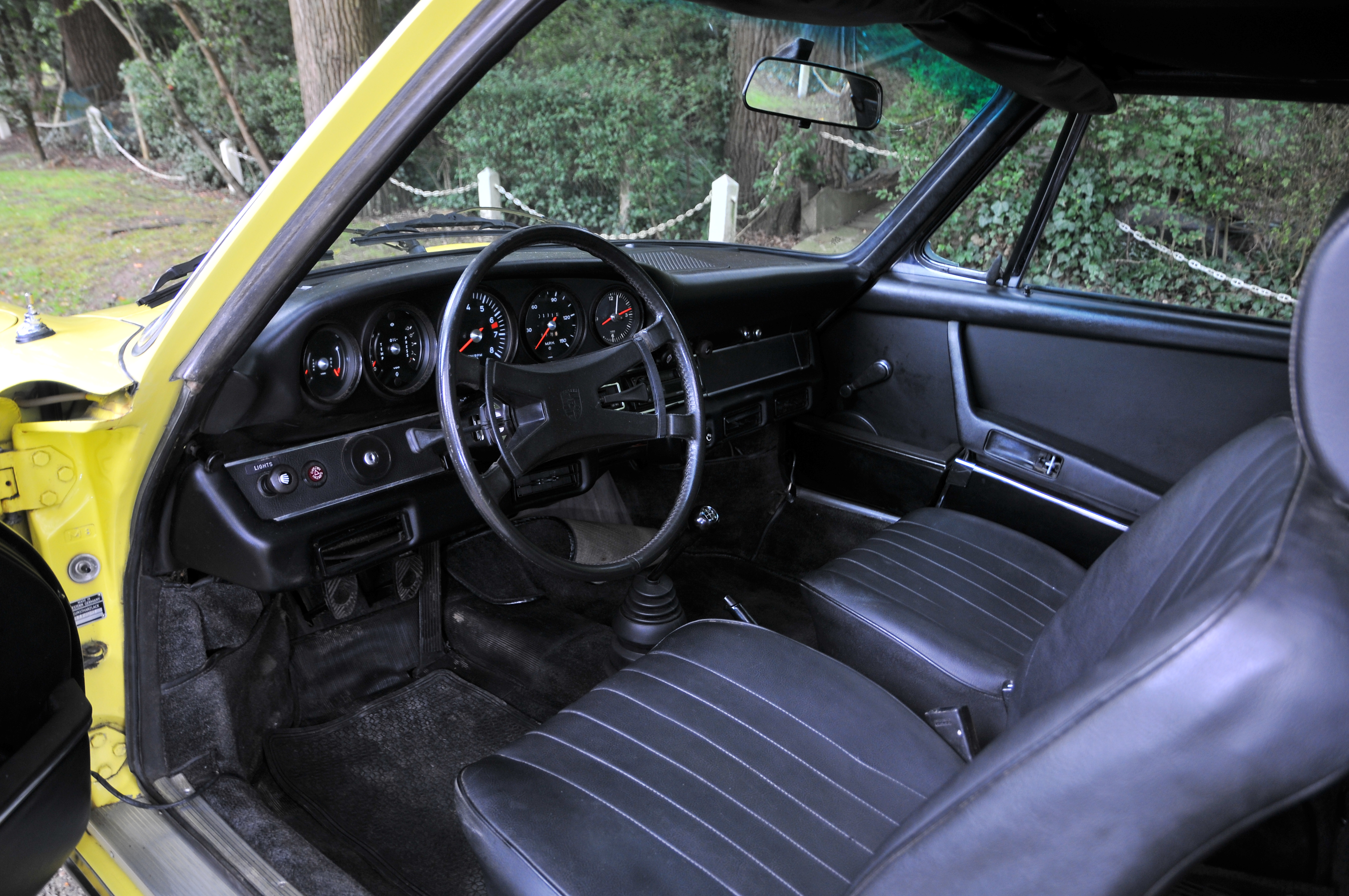
1972 Porsche 911 T interior

The 1972–1973 model years consisted of the same models of 911— the entry level T, the midrange E and the top-of-the-line S. However, all models received a new, larger 2,341 cc (2.341 L; 142.9 cu in) engine with the unchanged 84 mm bore and a lengthened 70.4 mm stroke (2.2L units had a 84 mm bore and 66 mm stroke). This is universally marketed as the "2.4L" engine, despite its displacement being closer to 2.3 litres— perhaps to emphasize the increase over the 2.2 L.

The 911E and 911S used mechanical fuel injection (MFI) in all markets. The 911T was carbureted, except in the United States and Japan where it also used MFI, which accounts for the 10 PS (7 kW) power difference. The new power ratings for the T models were: 130 PS (96 kW) with Zenith 40TIN for the manual (911/57 engine), and 125 PS (92 kW) with Weber 40IDTP3 for Sportomatic (911/67), or 140 PS (103 kW) with manual (911/51, MFI) or Sportomatic (911/61, MFI) in the U.S. and Japan. The ratings for the 911E were 165 PS (121 kW) for the manual (911/52, MFI) and the same 165 PS (121 kW) for the Sportomatic (911/62, MFI). S models were 190 PS (140 kW) for manual (911/53, MFI) and Sportomatic (911/63, MFI). 911S model also gained a discreet spoiler under the front bumper to improve high-speed stability. With a dry weight of 1,050 kg (2,310 lb), these models are often regarded as the best classic mainstream 911s.

With the power and torque increase, the 2.4 L cars also received a newer, stronger transmission, identified by its Porsche type number 915, derived from the transmission in the Porsche 908 race car. The 915 did away with the 901 transmission's "dog-leg" style first gear arrangement, opting for a traditional H pattern with first gear up to the left, second gear underneath first, etcetera. Some say this was because the dog-leg shift to second gear was inconvenient for city driving, others say it was due to Porsche's desire to put 5th gear outside the main transmission housing where it could easily be changed for different races.
Another significance of the 915 transmission is the differential gear axis line being closer to the engine to remedy the driveshafts having a rearward angle to accommodate the 57mm increase in wheelbase on the B, C, and D series. As a result, E series and later driveshafts (halfshafts) are at the right angles to the rear wheels when viewed from above (E-series and later cast semi-trailing arms have the lower damper attachment point moved rearward to clear the right-angle driveshaft). The moving rearward of differential gears gave more room for the gearbox part of the transaxle, accommodating thicker drive/driven gear pairs for a higher torque rating.

For the E-series in model year 1972, Porsche relocated the dry-sump oil tank from its position behind the right rear wheel to in front of it, at the expense of a hotter cabin in the Summer due to the tank's close proximity to the right-rear passenger seat. This had the effect of moving the weight of almost 8.5 L (9 US quarts) of oil from outside the wheelbase to inside, improving weight distribution and handling. An oil filler door (much like the fuel filler door on the left front fender) was installed on the right rear quarter panel to facilitate filling of the oil tank. This unique design was scrapped after only one year, some say because inattentive gas station attendants were putting gasoline in the oil tank. The oil tank was subsequently relocated to its original position for the model year 1973, and remained there until it was relocated within the wheelbase for the 964 model in 1989, which was largely delivered with air-conditioner.

In addition to the oil tank in its original position, F-series in 1973 model-year received black plastic horn grilles and blacked-out surrounds on the front and rear indicator light lenses (instead of the chrome-plated aluminium grilles and chrome-plated surrounds up to the E-series), black engine lid grille, as well as black "911T/E/S" and 'PORSCHE' letterings (which used to be gold-coloured) on the engine lid, as proposed by Pininfarina on the B17 concept in 1969.

In January 1973, U.S. 911Ts received the new K-Jetronic CIS (Continuous Fuel Injection) system from Bosch. These CIS-powered cars are usually referred to as "1973.5" models by enthusiasts in the US. The Japan-only 911T model (LHD, despite the traffic being on the left side, with metric instruments) retained the MFI. The power rating was unchanged 140 PS (103 kW) for both manual (911/91, CIS) and Sportomatic (911/96, CIS) with slower revving up/down due to the single throttle butterfly, as opposed to MFI's exceptionally quick revving up/down with six butterflies located close to the intake valves.

== Carrera RS 2.7 & RSR 2.8 (1972–1973) ==
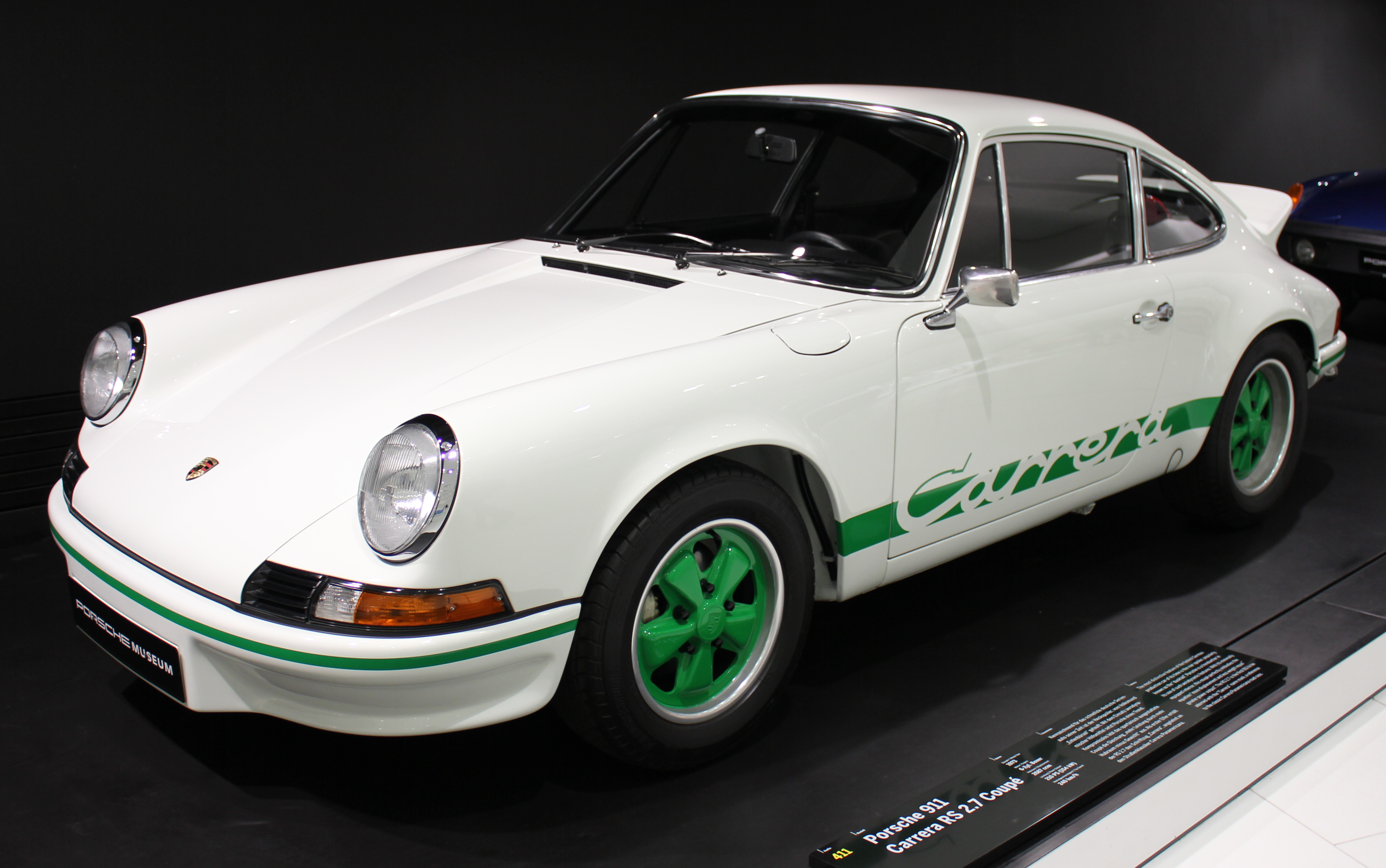
1973 Porsche 911 Carrera RS 2.7

The Carrera RS models, valued by collectors, are considered by many to be the greatest classic 911s of all time. RS stands for Rennsport in German, meaning "racing sport". The Carrera name was reintroduced from the 356 Carrera which had itself been named after Porsche's victories in the Carrera Panamericana races in Mexico in the 1950s. The RS was built so that Porsche could enter FIA Group 4 GT class in racing that required minimum 500 unit production volume. Compared with a standard 911S, the Carrera 2.7 RS had a larger 2.7 L; 164.0 cu in (2,687 cc) boxer-6 twin-ignition (911/83) engine with a bore x stroke of 90 mm × 70.4 mm (3.54 in × 2.77 in) developing 210 PS (154 kW) at 6,300 rpm and 255 N⋅m (188 lb⋅ft) of torque at 5,100 rpm with Bosch mechanical fuel injection.
Retaining the bore center distance of the 2L engines, this increase in bore size from 80 mm (of the 2L) to 90 mm was made possible in part by the Nickel-Silicone cylinder surface protection (NIKASIL) by Mahle GmbH, which enabled cylinder wall to be thinner, maintaining sufficient space for the cooling air in between cylinders.

911RS came with a revised and stiffened suspension, a "ducktail" rear spoiler, larger brakes, wider rear wheels/tyres and rear wings. In RS Touring form it weighed 1,075 kg (2,370 lb), in Sport Lightweight form it was about 100 kg (220 lb) lighter, the saving coming from the thin-gauge steel used for parts of the bodyshell and also the use of thinner glass. In total, 1,580 were made, comfortably exceeding the 500 that had to be made to qualify for the FIA Group 4 production GT class.

The Carrera RSR 2.8 is the whole reason for the Carrera RS 2.7 existence in the first place, as its production above 500 units qualified it for Group 4 Special GT racing class. These racing cars had wider front and rear arches/wheels/tyres and were built with 2,808 cc (911/72, 92 mm x 70.4 mm, 312 PS (229 kW)) engines. Just 55 out of a total run of 1,580 Carrera RS models produced were given the M491 conversion code that transformed them into the competition-focused models.

== 2.7-litre / G, H, I and J series (1974–1977) ==
=== The new impact bumper ===
MY 1974 was the introduction of impact bumpers to conform with low speed protection requirements of U.S. law, these bumpers being so successfully integrated into the design that they remained unchanged for 15 years. In 1974 the engine size was also increased to 2,687 cc, giving an increase in torque. The use of K-Jetronic CIS Bosch fuel injection in two of the three models in the line up— the 911 and 911S models, retaining the narrow rear wings of the old 2.4, now had a detuned version of the RS engine producing 150 and 175 PS (110 and 129 kW) respectively. The top of the line version received the Carrera name and was powered by the 210hp 2.7 of the old Carrera RS 2.7 for 1974–1975, and a 200hp 3.0 naturally aspirated derivation of the 930 Turbo engine for 1976–1977. In colloquial speak all 911s from MY1974 G-series until MY1989 are usually referred to as "G-series" because it was the introduction of major visual changes that remained in place until the introduction of the 964 generation.

=== Carrera 2.7 / G and H series (1974–1975) ===
The Carrera 2.7 was mechanically similar to the 1973 RS, inheriting its 210 PS (154 kW) MFI engine and still weighed the same at 1075 kg (2370 lb). It had the wide RS rear wings and also the ducktail for the 1974 model (except for the German market). It was available either as a coupé or a Targa. For 1976 a special run of 113 coupés with MFI were made. In addition, 30 MFI Targas with narrow rear wings were made for the Belgian Police.

The US Carrera 2.7 was restricted to the 2.7 K-Jetronic engine as the MFI RS engine was banned on emission grounds. Power output was 175 PS (129 kW), though it was later reduced to 165 PS (121 kW; 165 PS) for the U.S. market as a whole, and to 160 PS (118 kW; 160 PS) in California.

The well known problem of pulled cylinder head studs with the K-Jetronic 2.7 engine only occurred in hot climates. This emerged in 1975 in California where the thermal reactor, aimed at reducing emissions, was fitted below the left cylinder head thus causing heat build up around the magnesium crankcase and then made worse by the lean running K-Jetronic CIS. The fitting of a five-blade engine fan instead of the usual 11-blade further compounded the situation. Bearing in mind Porsche's largest market being the US, the 930 Turbo, Carrera 3.0 and all subsequent models used aluminium alloy crankcases which were around 15 lb (7 kg) heavier. To accommodate the thermal reactor, the length of exhaust pipe after the manifold / heat exchanger and before the muffler differed between the left bank of three cylinders and the right bank, causing a unique exhaust sound.

The Bosch K-Jetronic CIS varied fuel pressure to the injectors dependent on the mass airflow. While this system was exceedingly reliable, it did not allow the use of as "hot" cams as MFI or carburettors allowed. Therefore, the 911S's horsepower decreased from 190 to 175 PS (140 to 129 kW) despite the displacement increase from 2.4 to 2.7 L. However, the engine did have increased drivability.

=== Carrera 3.0 / I and J series (1976–1977) ===
The Carrera 3.0 was given the same diecast aluminium crankcase as the 930 or "911 Turbo". Its 3-litre engine had K-Jetronic CIS fuel injection. Power output was slightly down on the Carrera 2.7 at 200 PS (147 kW) although the 188 lb/ft of torque was now available at 4,200 rpm. Weight was up by 45 kg (99 lb) to 1,120 kg (2,469 lb).

During its two-year life span, 3,687 cars were built. Of these, 2,564 were coupés and 1,123 Targas.

=== 912E (1976) ===
Also produced for the 1976 model year, for the U.S. market, was the 912E, a four-cylinder version of the 911 like the 912 that had last been produced in 1969. It used the I-series chassis and the 2.0-litre Volkswagen engine from the Porsche 914. In all, 2099 units were produced. In 1976, the Porsche 924 took this car's place for the 1977 model year and beyond. The power was supplied by a four-cylinder high-performance fuel injection motor also used in the Volkswagen 411. Fewer than 3,000 were built.

== Carrera RS 3.0, RSR 3.0 & RSR Turbo 2.1 (1974) ==
In 1974, Porsche created the Carrera RS 3.0 (911/77, 95 mm bore x 70.4 mm stroke, 2,993 cc) producing 230 PS (169 kW) as a road model. It was almost twice as expensive as the 2.7 RS but offered a fair amount of racing capability for that price. The chassis was largely similar to that of the 1973 Carrera RSR racing model and the brake system was from the Porsche 917. The use of thin metal body panels and a spartan interior enabled the shipping weight to be reduced to around 900 kg (2,000 lb).

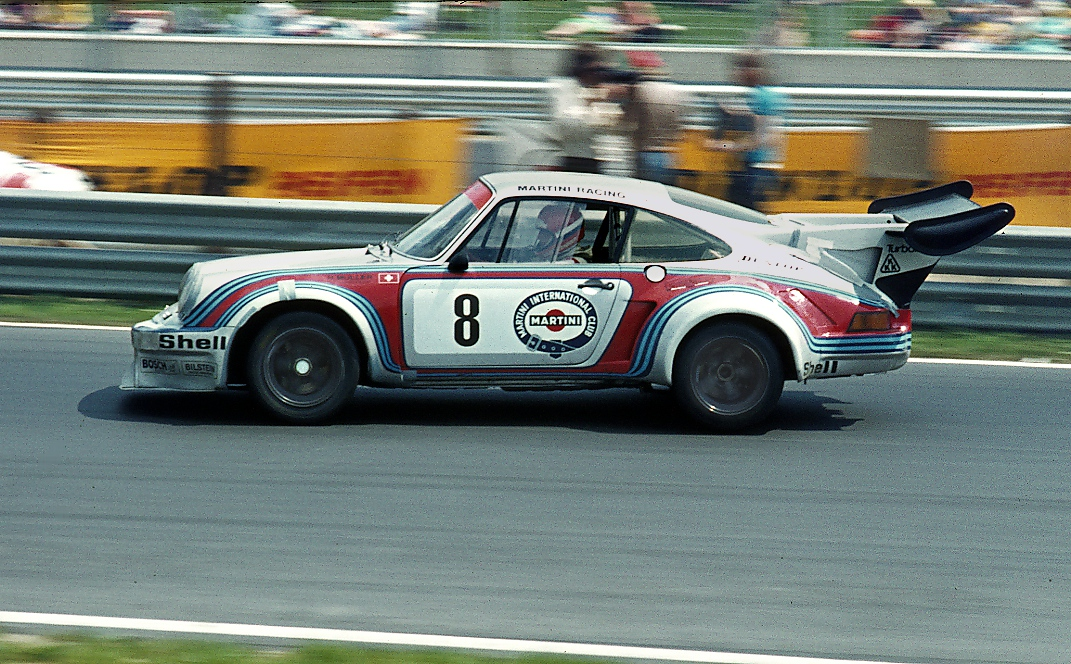
911 Carrera RSR Turbo with Gijs van Lennep at the 1974 Nürburgring 1000 km

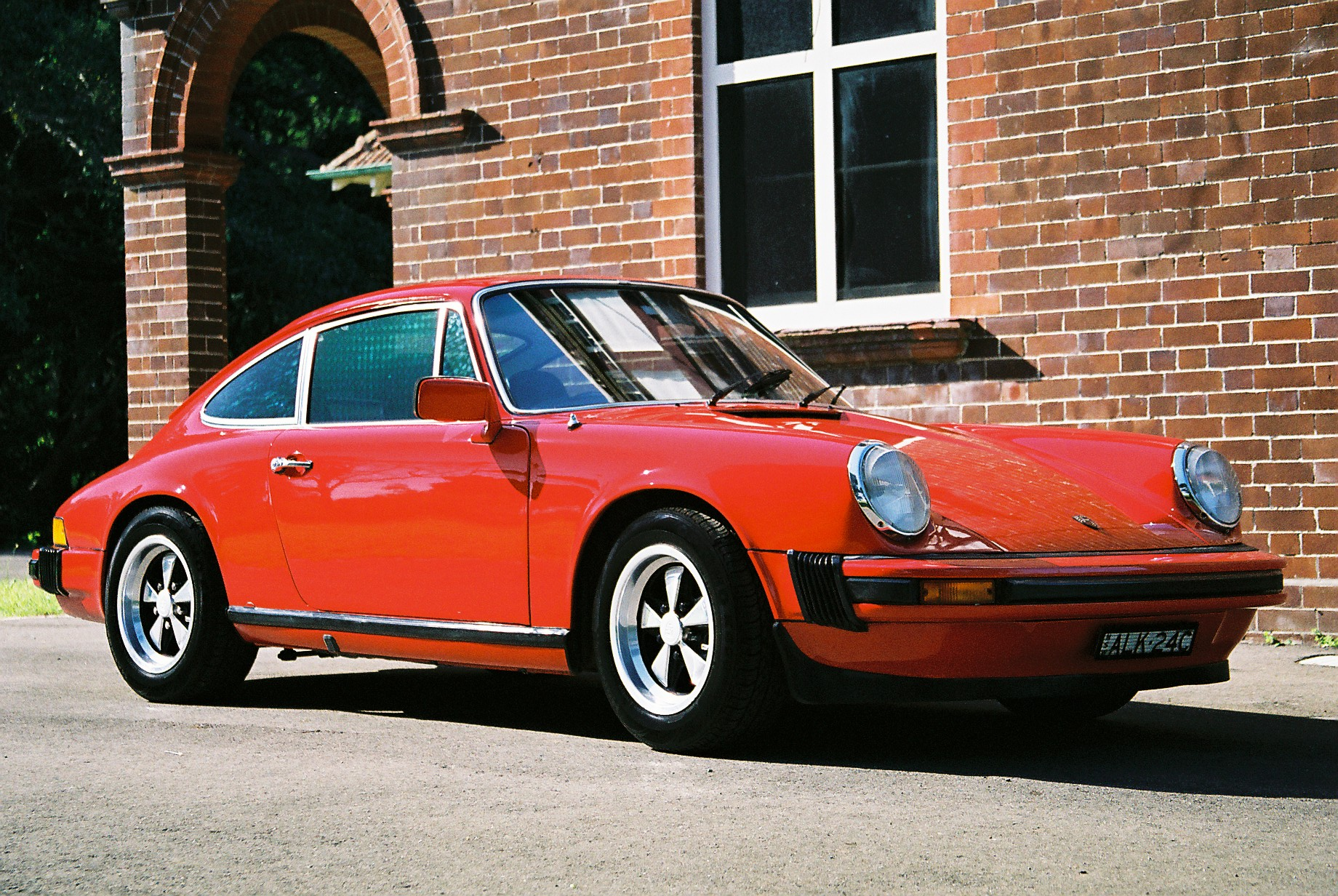
1976 Porsche 911 2.7

The Carrera RSR 3.0 (911/74, 2,993 cc, 95 mm bore x 70.4 mm stroke, 315 PS (232 kW)) and Carrera RSR Turbo (911/76, 500 PS (368 kW) 83 mm x 66 mm, 2,142 cc engine, due to a 1.4x turbo-equivalency formula) were made in low volume for racing in 1974. The RSR Turbo came in second overall at the 24 Hours of Le Mans in 1974, a significant event in that its engine would form the basis of many future Porsche attempts in sports car racing, and can be regarded as the start of its commitment to turbocharging the 911/930, after the 917/10 in Can-Am.

== Turbo (Type 930) (1974–1989) ==
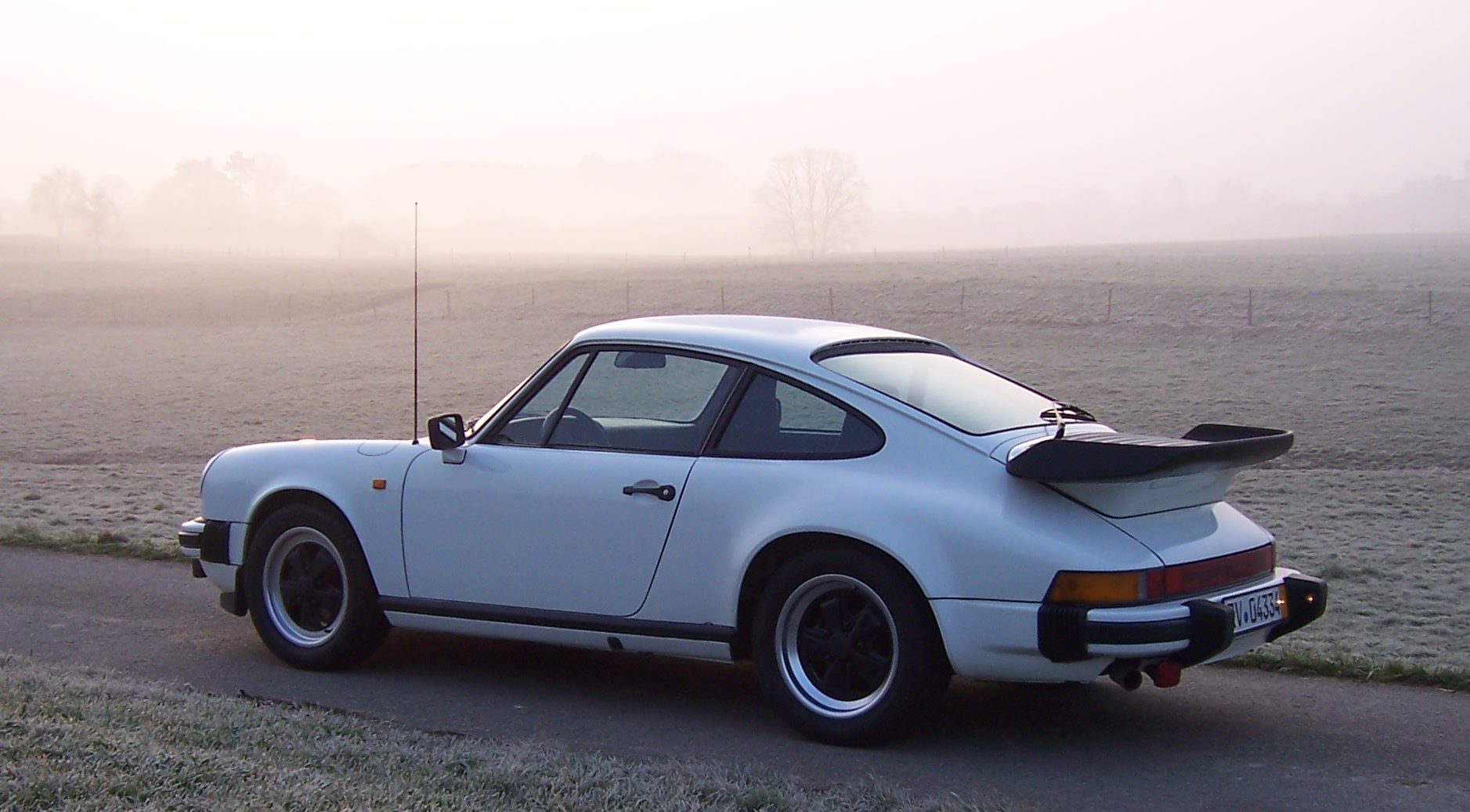
Porsche 911SC 1981 WTL (Werks-Turbo-Look)

In 1974, Porsche introduced the first production turbocharged 911. Although called simply Porsche 911 Turbo in Europe, it was marketed as the Porsche 930 (930 being its internal type number) in North America. The body shape is distinctive, thanks to wide wheel-arches to accommodate the wide tires, and a large rear spoiler often known as a "whale tail" on the early cars, and "tea-tray" on the later ones. Starting out with a 3.0 L engine producing 260 PS (191 kW), it rose to 3.3 L and 300 PS (221 kW) for 1978. The early cars are known for their exhilarating acceleration coupled with challenging handling characteristics and extreme turbo lag.

Production figures of the car soon qualified its racing version for FIA Group 4 competition as the Porsche 934 of 1976. Many participated at Le Mans and other races including some epic battles with the BMW 3.0 CSL "Batmobile". The wilder Porsche 935, a finer tuned car in FIA Group 5 that evolved from the 2.1 L RSR Turbo of 1974, was first campaigned in 1976 by the factory, and despite subsequent withdrawal of the official works team after 1978, it ultimately won Le Mans outright in 1979 in the hands of the private Kremer Racing team. Privateers continued to compete successfully with the car until well into the 1980s.

Due to stricter emissions regulations, the 930 was withheld from the US and Japanese markets from 1981 through 1985. It was re-introduced into the United States in 1986.

As demand for the Turbo soared in the late 1980s, Porsche introduced novelty variants including a slant-nose version (option M505/M506), while not significantly improving the range mechanically. Although these cars could be sold for extraordinary premiums over the standard models, the company's reluctance to invest in research and development of the entire 911 line at that time turned out to be an almost fatal decision not only for the 911, but for the company.

Only in 1989, its last year of production, was the 930 equipped with a five-speed gearbox. The 930 was replaced in 1990 with a 964 version featuring the same 3.3 L engine.

There have been turbocharged variants of each subsequent generation of 911.

== SC / L, M, A, B, C and D series (1978–1983) ==
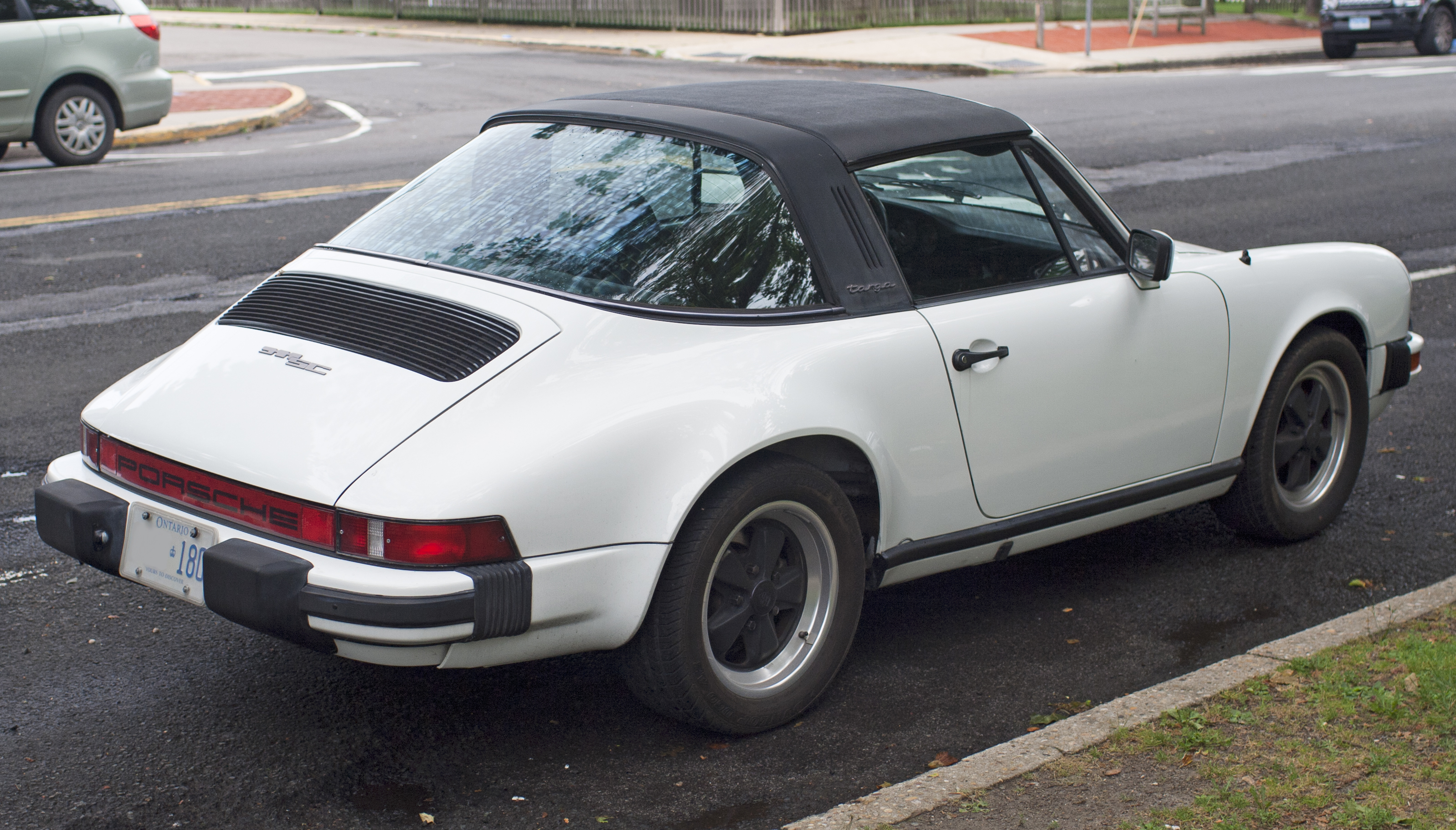
Porsche 911SC Targa

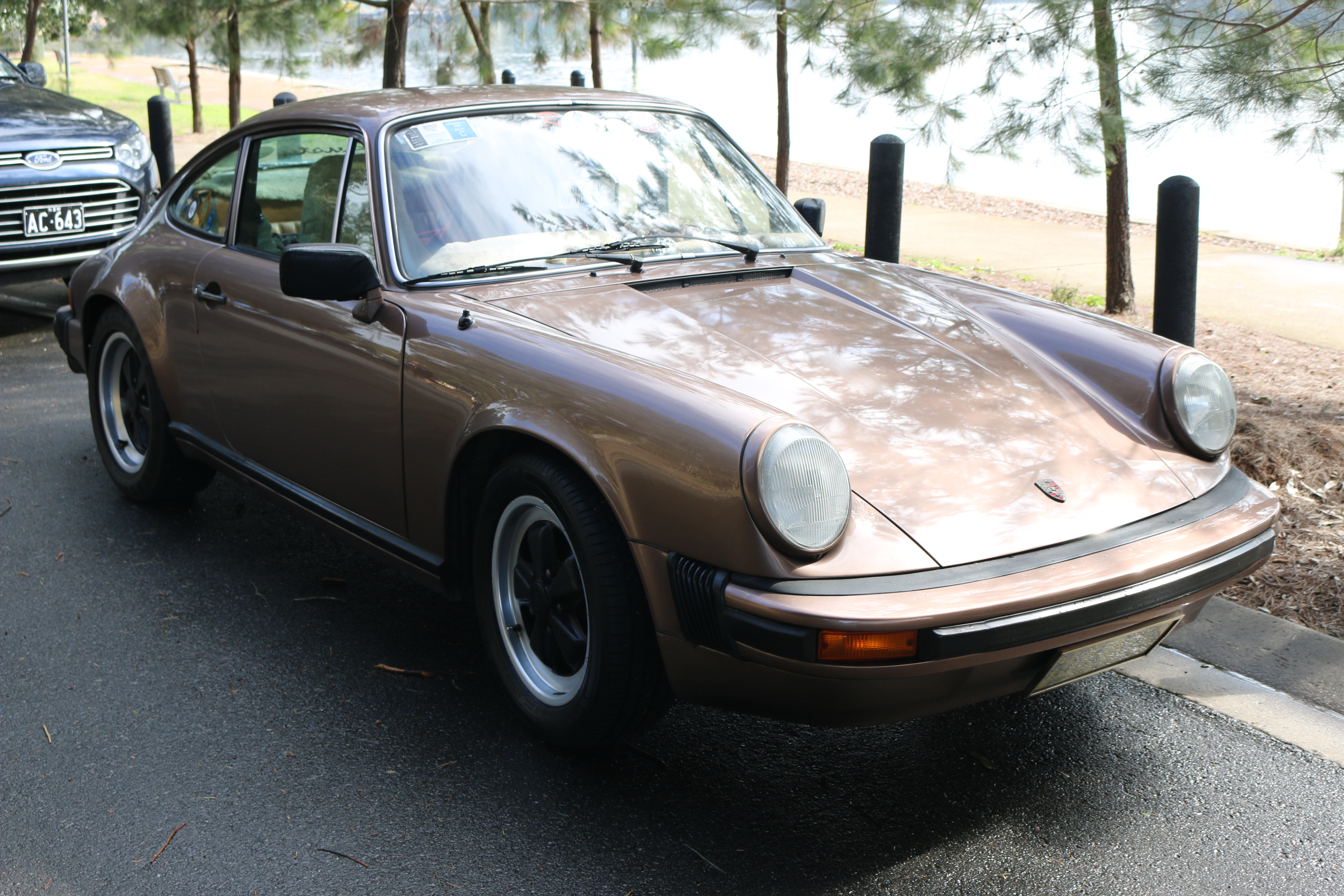
1977 Porsche 911SC

Starting in MY 1978, the new 3.0 L 911 SC (2,994 cc) was now the second generation basic 911 model. It was in effect a Carrera 3 (known as a 911S in the United States) detuned to provide 180 PS (132 kW). The "SC" designation was reintroduced by Porsche for the first time since the 356 SC (as distinguished from the race-engined 356 Carrera). No Carrera versions were produced and the 930 Turbo remaining at the top of the range. Porsche's engineers felt that the weight of the extra luxury, safety and emissions equipment on these cars was blunting performance compared to the earlier, lighter cars with the same power output, so in non-US cars, power was increased to 188 PS (138 kW) for 1980, then finally to 204 PS (150 kW). However, cars sold in the US market retained their lower-compression, 180 PS (132 kW; 180 PS) engines throughout. This enabled them to be run on lower-octane fuel.

In model year 1980, Porsche offered a Weissach special edition version of the 911 SC, named after the town in Germany where Porsche has their research center. Designated M439, it was offered in two colors with the turbo whale tail & front chin spoiler, body color-matched Fuchs alloy wheels and other convenience features as standard. 408 cars were built for North America. In 1982, a Ferry Porsche Edition was made and a total of 200 cars were sold with this cosmetic package.

SCs sold in the UK could be specified with the Sport Group Package (UK) which added stiffer suspension, the rear spoiler, front rubber lip and black Fuchs wheels.

In 1981, a Cabriolet concept car was shown at the Frankfurt Motor Show. Not only was the car a true convertible, but it also featured four-wheel drive, although this was dropped in the production version. The first 911 Cabriolet debuted in late 1982, as a 1983 model. This was Porsche's first cabriolet since the 356 of the mid-1960s. It proved very popular with 4,214 sold in its introductory year, despite its premium price relative to the open-top targa. Cabriolet versions of the 911 have been offered ever since.

It was during this time, that Porsche AG decided the long-term fate of the 911. In 1979, Porsche had made plans to replace the 911 with their new 928. Sales of the 911 remained so strong however, that Porsche revised its strategy and decided to inject new life into the 911 editions.

Peter W. Schutz (CEO Porsche AG 1981–1987) wrote:

The decision to keep the 911 in the product line occurred one afternoon in the office of Dr Helmuth Bott de:Helmuth Bott, the Porsche operating board member responsible for all engineering and development. I noticed a chart on the wall of Professor Bott's office. It depicted the ongoing development schedules for the three primary Porsche product lines: 944, 928 and 911. Two of them stretched far into the future, but the 911 program stopped at the end of 1981. I remember rising from my chair, walking over to the chart, taking a black marker pen, and extending the 911 program bar clean off the chart. I am sure I heard a silent cheer from Professor Bott, and I knew I had done the right thing. The Porsche 911, the company icon, had been saved, and I believe the company was saved with it.

911 SC sales totaled 58,914 cars.

== 3.2 Carrera / E, F, G, H, I, J and K series (1984–1989) ==
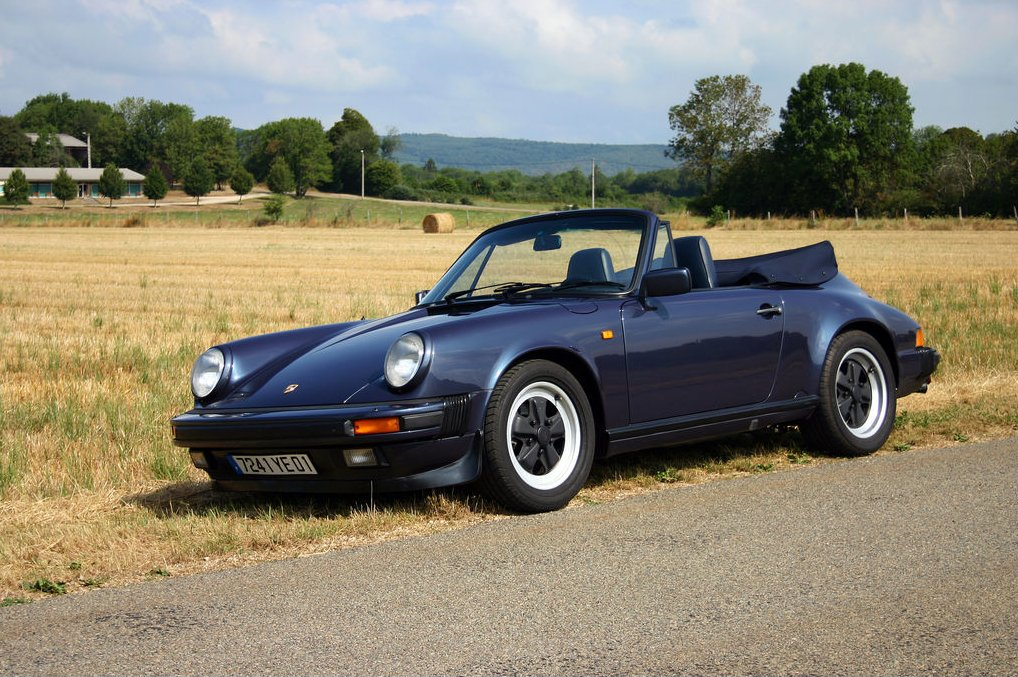
1986 Porsche 911 Carrera Cabriolet

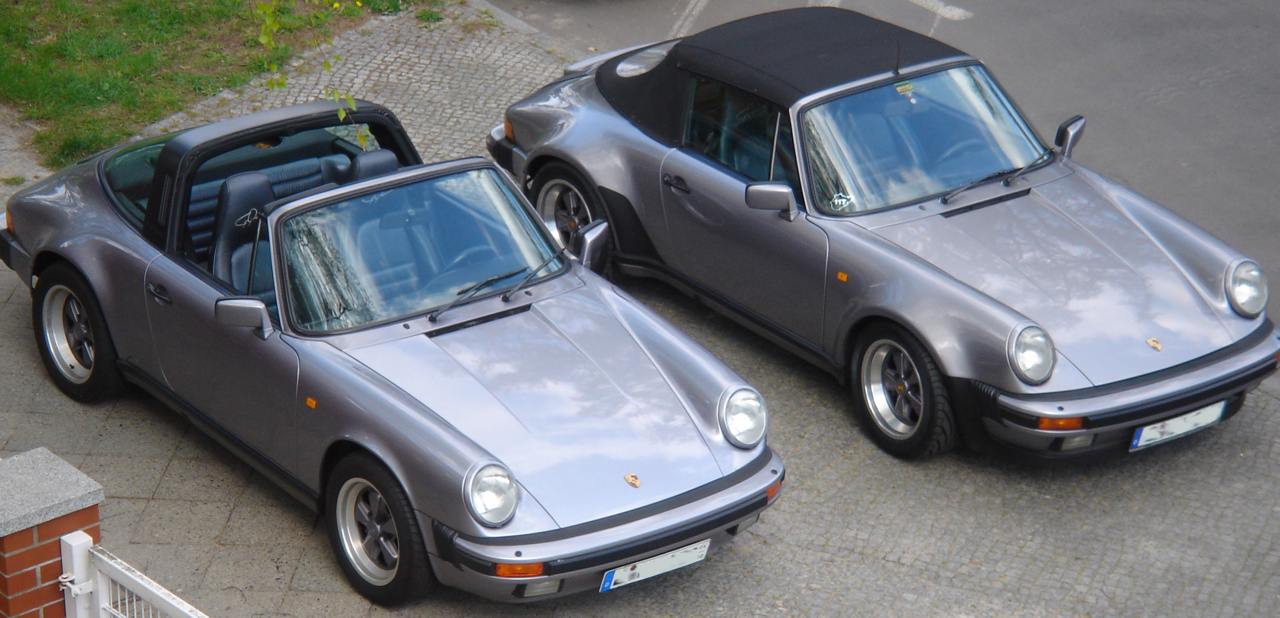
The Porsche 911 3.2 series were available in Coupe, Cabriolet and Targa styles.

With the 911's future ensured, 1983 saw the launch of a replacement for the successful SC series. It was the MY 1984 911 3.2 Carrera, reviving the Carrera name for the first time since 1977. The 911 3.2 Carrera was the second iteration of the 911 series, with all subsequent models featuring new body styling with new brake, electronic and suspension technologies.

A new, higher-displacement motor, a 3.2-litre version of Porsche's horizontally opposed flat-six, was utilized. At the time, Porsche claimed it was 80% new. The new swept volume of 3,164 cc was achieved using the 95 mm (3.7 in) bore (from the previous SC model) combined with the 1978 Turbo 3.3 crankshaft's 74.4 mm (2.9 in) stroke. In addition, higher domed pistons increased the compression ratio from 9.8 to 10.3:1 (although only 9.5:1 for the US market). New inlet manifold and exhaust systems were fitted. The 915 transmission was carried over from the SC series for the first three model years. In 1987, the Carrera got a new five-speed gearbox sourced from Getrag, model number G50 with proven Borg-Warner synchronizers. This slightly heavier version also featured a hydraulically operated clutch.

With the new engine, power was increased to 207 PS (152 kW; 207 PS) at 5,900 rpm for North American-delivered cars and to 231 PS (170 kW) at 5,900 rpm for most other markets. This version of the 911 accelerated from 0–60 mph (97 km/h) in 5.4 seconds (Car & Driver tested 5.3 seconds for the US version) and had a top speed of 150 mph (240 km/h) as measured by Autocar. Factory times were more modest: 0–60 mph time of 6.3 seconds for the US version and 6.1 seconds for cars outside the American market.

The disc brakes were increased in size to aid in more effective heat dissipation and improved oil-fed chain tensioners were fitted to the engine. To improve oil cooling, a finned cooler replaced the serpentine lines in the front passenger fender well. This was further improved in 1987, with the addition of a thermostatically controlled fan.

Driving refinement and motor reliability were improved with an upgrade of the fuel and ignition control components to a L-Jetronic with Bosch Motronics 2 DME (Digital Motor Electronics system). An improvement in fuel-efficiency was due to the DME providing a petrol cut-off on the overrun. Changes in the fuel map & chip programming from October 1986, further improved the power to 217 PS (160 kW; 217 PS) at 5,900 rpm for North American delivered cars as well as for other markets requesting low emissions, like Germany. Custom-mapped chips remain a popular upgrade. The fuel relay that is mounted externally on the DME is known to be a weak point of the system.

Three basic models were available throughout the Carrera years – coupé, targa and cabriolet. When launched in 1984 in the United States, the prices of the 911 Carrera lineup were $31,950 for the coupé, $33,450 for the targa and $36,450 for the cabriolet. Almost indistinguishable from the SC, external clues are the front fog lights, which were integrated into the front valance in the Carrera. Very modest cosmetic changes were made throughout the lifespan of the Carrera, with a redesigned dash featuring larger air conditioning vents appearing in 1986.

Two special editions of the Carrera were produced – the "Commemorative Edition" in 1988, to commemorate 250,000 911s produced and an "Anniversary" edition in 1989, which was the model's 25th year of production. Both were cosmetic packages with limited production.

In 1984, Porsche also introduced the M491 option. Officially called the Supersport, it was commonly known as the "Turbo-look". It was a style that resembled the Porsche 930 Turbo with wide wheel arches and the distinctive "tea tray" tail. It featured the stiffer turbo suspension and the superior turbo braking system as well as the wider turbo wheels. Sales of the Supersport were particularly strong for its first two years in the United States because the desirable 930 Turbo was not available.

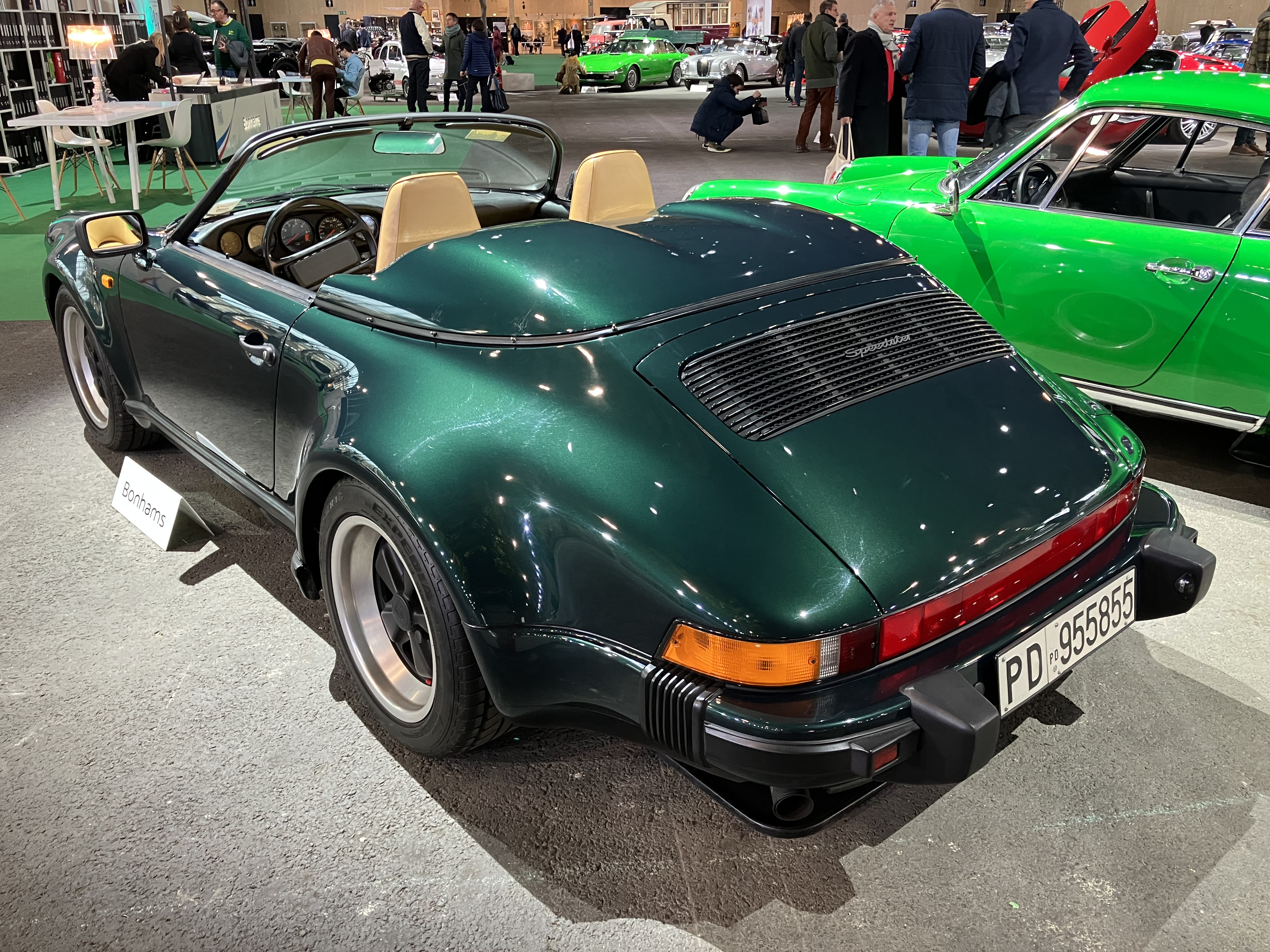
1989 Porsche 911 'Turbo Look' Speedster

The 911 Speedster (option M503), a low-roof version of the Cabriolet which was evocative of the Porsche 356 Speedster of the 1950s, was produced in limited numbers (2,104) between January 1989 and July 1989 as both a narrow body car and a Turbo-look, which also featured 930 brakes, wheels, suspension, and front valence. 171 narrow body examples were built, and 823 examples were built for the US market. It started as a design under Helmuth Bott in 1983 but was not manufactured until six years later, championed by Porsche's president, the German-American Peter Schutz. A prototype based in the 911SC was shown at the Frankfurt Motor Show in 1987, reworked by chief stylist Anatole Lapine. It was a two-seat convertible that featured a low swept windshield and a pair of controversial 'camel hump' cowlings behind the seats that concealed the stowed-away manual hood.

In 1985, Porsche built a Club Sport prototype with the identification number WP0ZZZ91ZFS100848. Later on in that year, a Carrera Club Sport (RoW) with the identification number WP0ZZZ91ZFS101166 was special ordered after a Porsche driver was particularly inspired by the Club Sport prototype on the track. In 1987, Porsche decided to produce 340 units for their customers that wanted a track inspired road car, the Club Sport lost around 50 kg (110 lb) in weight by ditching non-essential equipment such as the radio, sunroof, A/C and the rear seats. By 1989, the Club Sport was no longer produced which makes it today a collectible with its blueprinted engine and low production numbers. Total production of the 911 3.2 Carrera series was 76,473 cars (35,670 coupé, 19,987 cabrio, 18,468 targa).

In late 1989, the 911 underwent a major evolution, with the introduction of the Type Porsche 964 (1989–1993).

== Position vis-à-vis the Porsche 928 ==
When 911 sales began to decline by the early 1970s, Porsche executives approved work on the Porsche 928 in 1971. Larger and featuring a front-mounted water-cooled V8 engine considerably more powerful than the contemporary 911's air-cooled flat six, the 928 was intended to be a comfortable grand tourer rather than a dedicated sports car. Capable of out-accelerating and even matching or exceeding the 911's cornering prowess in some model years, the 928 sold reasonably well from its introduction in 1977 until its discontinuation in 1995. In spite of its overall capability, the expensive company flagship never outsold the 911. Unlike its smaller, sportier 4-cylinder sibling Porsche 924 variants, the 928 was never raced by the factory, and seldom by privateers. Comparable large engine Mercedes 450 SLC 5.0 and Jaguar XJS were raced with some success, though.

== Motorsport ==
The Porsche factory's first 911-based race car was a lightly modified 1964 Type 901. It finished fifth in the 1965 Monte Carlo Rally and is now housed in the Porsche Museum.

Porsche 911s dominated the Trans Am Series under two litre class in the sixties, winning the championship from 1967 to 1969. They would later go on to win the championship in 1973, 1974, and 1980. Despite Trans Am being a sedan championship in its early years, the Porsche 911 was a sports car. Its inclusion is likely due to its resemblance to a coupé.

A 1967 911 was driven by Jack Ryan raced in NASCAR for a total of 13 races of the 1968 season.
