= Porsche Typ 754 T7 =

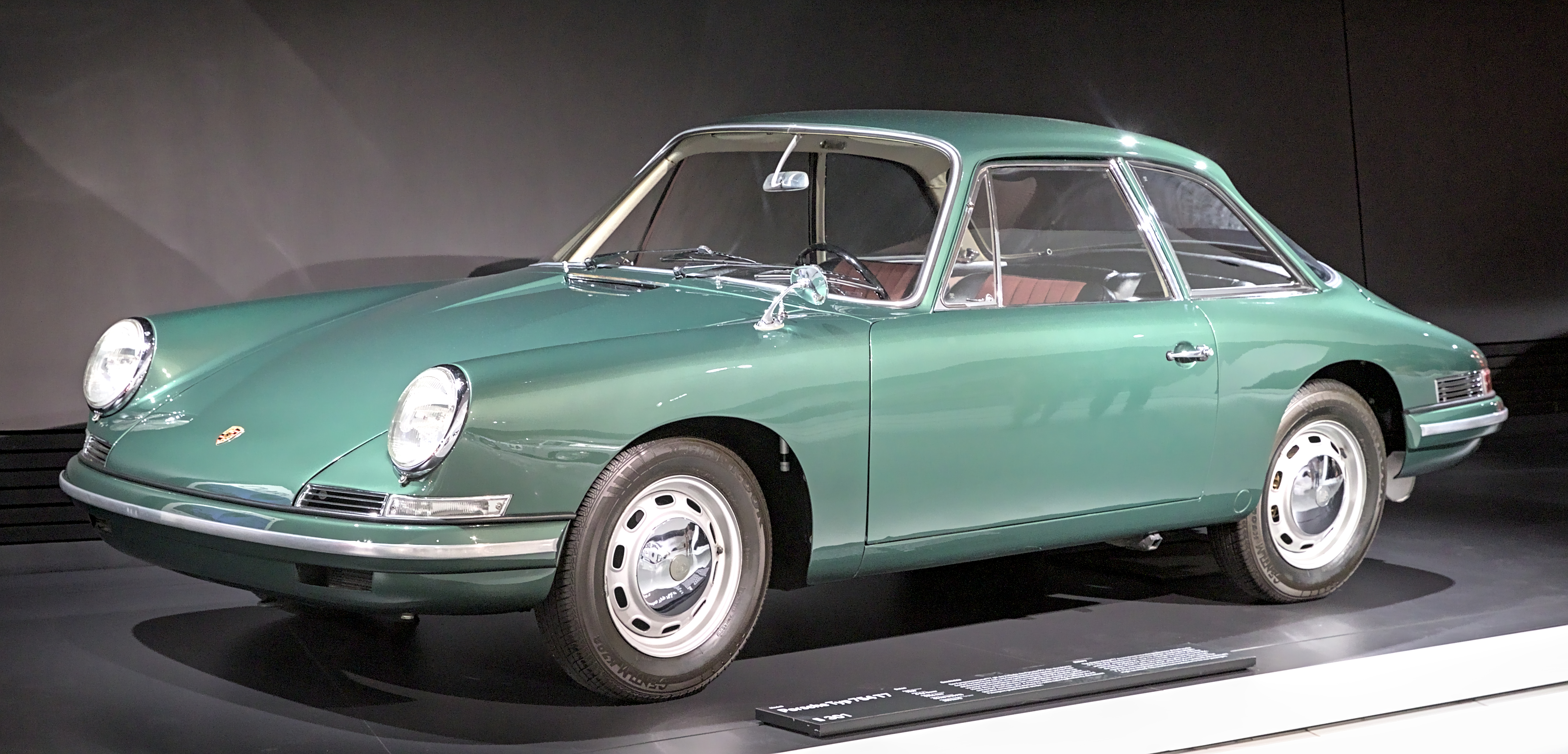
- Porsche 754 T7 prototype

Overview
- Manufacturer: Porsche
- Also called: Porsche 695; Porsche T7 prototype
- Production: 1961

Body and chassis
- Class: Concept car
- Body style: 2-door coupe
- Layout: Rear-engine, rear-wheel-drive
- Related: Porsche 911

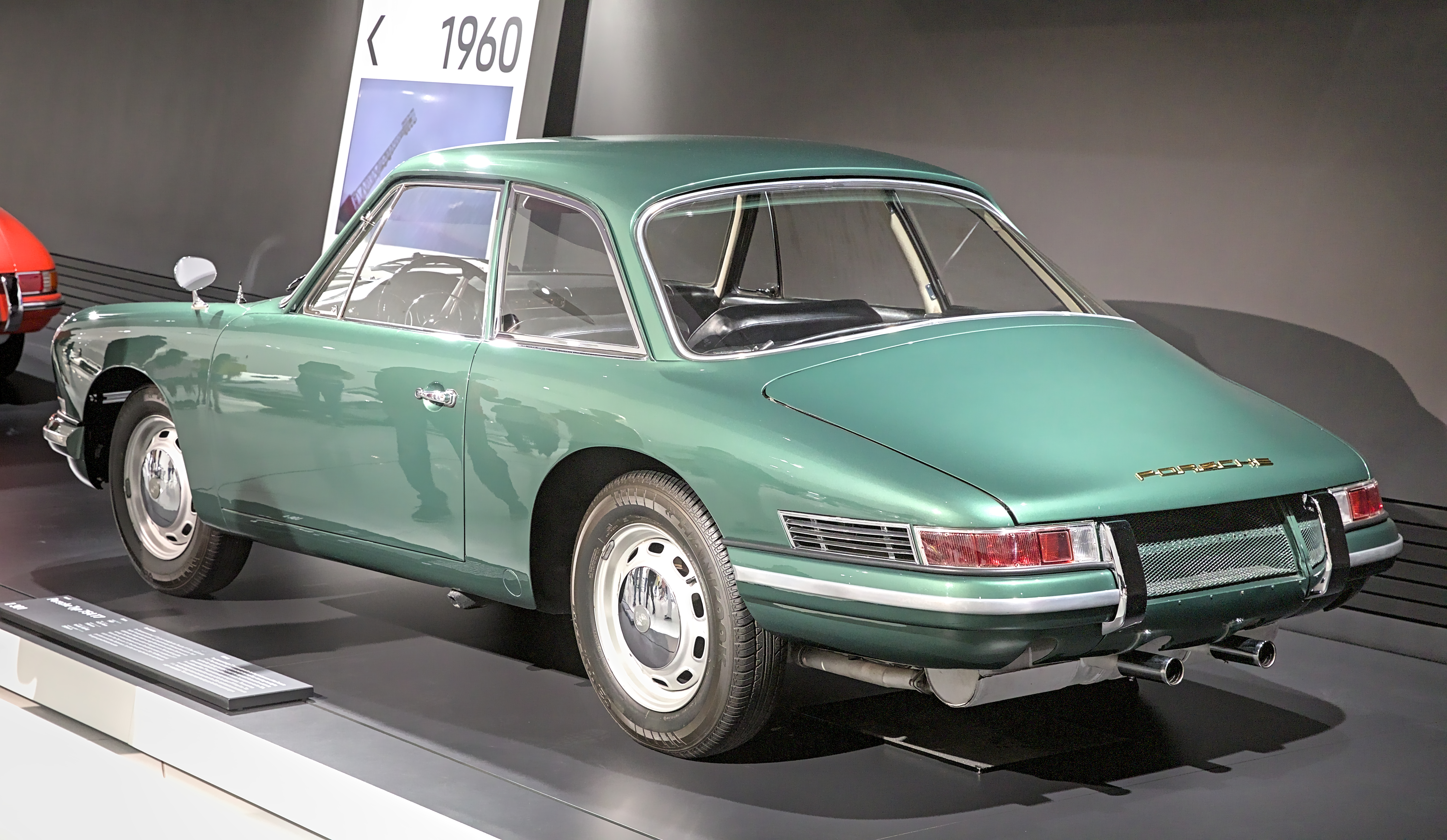
Porsche 754 T7 prototype in the Porsche Museum

The Porsche Typ 754 T7, also known as the T7 Prototype or 695, is a prototype automobile built by Porsche in 1961. It would later become the Porsche 911. The front end is very similar to the 911, but the rear is somewhat different. Also, unlike the 911, the T7 had four seats. The T7 was developed from the Porsche 356 by Ferdinand Alexander Porsche, and has a wheelbase that is 100 mm (3.9 in) longer (up to 300 mm (11.8 in) longer in early designs). It has a top speed of 200 km/h (124 mph).

The car is currently on display at the Porsche Museum, Stuttgart.
