= Porsche 909 Bergspyder =

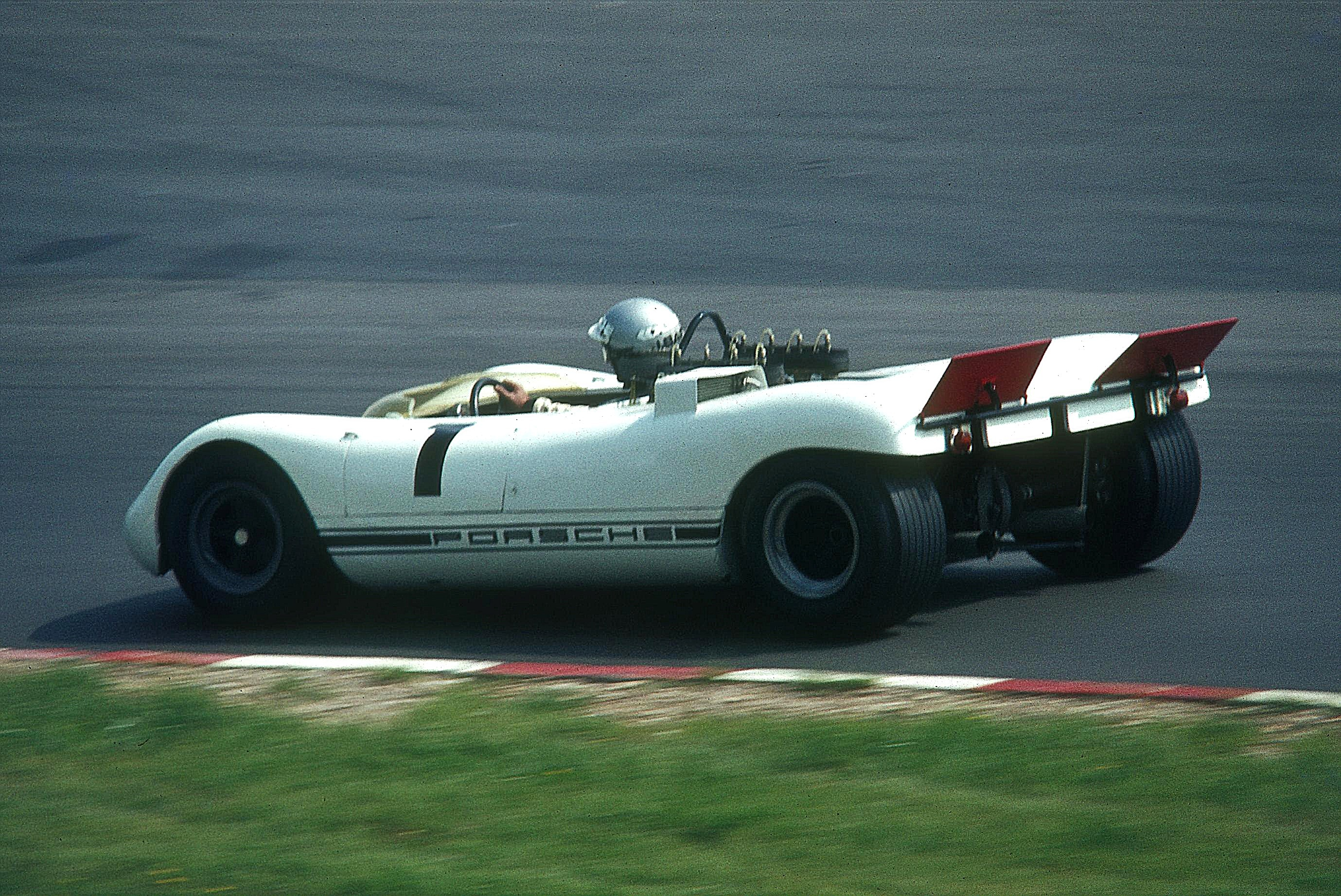
- Porsche 909 Bergspyder photographed in 1981

Overview
- Manufacturer: Porsche
- Production: 1968
- Designer: Ferdinand Piëch

Body and chassis
- Body style: Spyder

Powertrain
- Engine: 2.0L Type 771 flat-eight engine
- Power output: 275 hp (205 kW)

Dimensions
- Curb weight: 384 kg (847 lb)

The Porsche 909 "Bergspyder" was a spyder sports car designed and built by Porsche in 1968. Its purpose was to compete in hillclimbing competitions, specifically the EHCC Sports Car (Gr. P) class of the European Hillclimb Championship. It was a short-lived model, but its basic structure, technical innovations, and overall design became the basis for the successful 908/3.

== History ==
Porsche had reigned champion with earlier models, the 910, 907, and 908, winning nine European Hillclimb Championship titles out of eleven years of participation. After being defeated two years in a row, Ferrari set out to develop a dedicated hillclimb car to challenge Porsche in 1967. This car was the 212 E Montagna, and was announced to compete for the 1968 European Hillclimb Championship. Despite this initial claim, Ferrari postponed its development, with the car being unveiled in 1969. Still, given the shocking news at the time of the 212's announcement, Ferdinand Piëch and his team of engineers at Porsche urgently developed a car to battle Ferrari.

Luckily for Porsche, the car was finished in time for the 1968 EHCC season, with Porsche driver Rolf Stommelen driving the 909 Bergspyder in two races in the European Hillclimb Championship. Proving the car's rapid pace and technological advancement, he placed 2nd and 3rd despite recently recovering from an arm injury. Porsche driver Gerhard Mitter preferred the Porsche 910/8, an older model was still competitive, because the Porsche 909 Bergspyder was said to be a handful to drive and had reliability issues. Regardless of the 909's mediocre success and the 910/8's age, the pair of cars dominated the 1968 European Hillclimb Championship. Porsche came out on top, with Mitter and his Porsche 910/8 placing first in the EHCC Sports Car (Gr. P) class.

Although Porsche was achieving lots of success in hillclimb racing, the development of the 917—used in the pursuit of winning Le Mans, the World Sportscar Championship, and eventually Can-Am—took precedent over participating in the European Hillclimb Championship. This allowed the Ferrari 212 E, a heavier but more powerful car than the 909, to completely outmatch its peers in the 1969 European Hill Climb Championship. Impressively, the car didn't just win overall, but it won every race it entered and set multiple course records.

The 909 Bergspyder influenced Porsche’s subsequent racing-car development, particularly the 908/3.

== Construction and performance ==
The Porsche 909 Bergspyder was equipped with the 2.0 L, 275 hp (205 kW) Type 771 flat-eight engine, derived from Porsche's earlier efforts in Formula 1.

The power unit was coupled to an extremely lightweight spaceframe chassis made of aluminum. The car also featured non-magnetic, exotic, and dangerous metals like beryllium, titanium, silver, and magnesium in the pursuit of shaving weight. Steel was not used in the 909. To give an idea of what lengths the engineers went to with the 909, the fiberglass body weighed just 10 kg (22 lb), and instead of a fuel pump, the car utilized a pressurized titanium ball that delivered fuel to the engine in order to save weight.

This is only a summary of the long list of innovations that Piëch and his team of engineers made for the 909. The car weighed an astonishing 385 kg (849 lb) and was capable of an incredible 0-60 mph time of 2.4 seconds.

Porsche experimented with a body featuring front canards and two symmetric air ducts, in addition to the smooth front-end seen on the car in the Porsche museum today.
