= Porsche flat-eight engines =

Flat engines by Porsche

German carmaker Porsche built several series of flat-eight engines of differing displacements over the course of many years. They were mainly used in Porsche's racing cars.

== Type 753 ==
The first Porsche flat-eight was the Type 753. Work began on it in 1960, following the announcement of a 1.5-litre displacement limit for the 1961 Formula One (F1) season. The design of the new F1 engine was done by Hans Hönick and Hans Mezger. The 753 inherited the traditional Porsche features of a boxer layout and air-cooling, but with the number of cylinders increased to eight.

Bore and stroke were 66.0 mm × 54.6 mm (2.6 in × 2.1 in) respectively, resulting in a displacement of 1,494.38 cc (91.2 cu in). The oversquare dimensions kept piston speeds low, and also kept the engine narrow and as far out of the airflow on the sides of the car's tub as possible, although it was still wider than the 120° V6 and 90° V8s of the competition.

The centre of the engine was a magnesium crankcase cast in two halves split vertically along the centre-line of the crankshaft. The crankcase carried a one-piece crankshaft in nine main bearings. The eight aluminum cylinder barrels had their bores treated with a spray-on molybdenum/steel coating called Ferral. Each finned cylinder had its own separate aluminum cylinder head, with four studs per cylinder holding the heads and barrels to the crankcase. An aluminum valve-gear cover cast as a single piece stabilized the four cylinders on each side of the engine.

The valvetrain was similar in some respects to that designed by Ernst Fuhrmann for the Type 547 four-cylinder engine. There were two overhead camshafts per cylinder bank, operating two valves per cylinder. As with the 547, the cams were driven by shafts rather than gears or chains, and the cam lobes were separate pieces that were keyed onto the shaft. The 753 added a second countershaft above the crankshaft to the single one underneath the crankshaft in the 547. Both countershafts rotated at half crankshaft speed. Two layshafts from the upper countershaft drove the left and right intake camshafts, while two other layshafts from the lower countershaft drove the exhaust camshafts, eliminating the vertical shafts in the 547's cylinder heads that gave that engine one of its nicknames. A short vertical shaft from the bevel gear on the right-hand inlet camshaft drove the axial cooling fan at 0.92x crankshaft speed. The valvetrain was designed to operate reliably at up to 10,000 rpm.

The engine had a dry sump system with a separate oil tank. A Bosch dual ignition system with four ignition coils and two distributors fired two spark plugs per cylinder. The air-fuel mixture was delivered by four 38 mm (1.5 in) Weber double downdraft carburetors; two on each side.

Assembly of the engine was a time-consuming job, often requiring repeated assembly and disassembly with extensive hand-fitting of components. Building and setting up a 753 never took less than 100 hours and could take up to 220 hours. The engine, with exhaust and clutch, was 23.7 in (602 mm) long, 27.8 in (710 mm) wide, 20.6 in (523 mm) high and weighed 341 lb (154.7 kg).

A prototype engine was first started on a test-bench on 12 December 1960. Initial power output was disappointing; 105 hp (78.3 kW) (some sources say 120 hp (89.5 kW)), when the target had been 200 hp (149.1 kW).

Mezger and his team worked to improve both the engine's reliability and power output. The earliest engines had a 90° angle between the valves. When this was reduced, first to 84° and subsequently to 72°, power output rose. Other changes included reshaping the combustion chamber, lightening crank pins, and switching to titanium connecting rods. Power was eventually raised to 185 hp (138.0 kW).

Although the chassis of the Type 787 F1 car was lengthened to accommodate the 753, the flat-eight was never installed and the car used the 547 throughout its short life. The 753 engine debuted in Porsche's Formula One Type 804 on 20 May 1962 at the Dutch Grand Prix at Zandvoort. With a compression ratio of 10.0:1, the engine produced 132 kW (177 hp) at 9200 rpm on its first outing. This was still less power than the new Coventry-Climax and BRM V8 engines. With the improved six-speed transmission from the Type 718 and a ZF limited-slip differential, the car reached a top speed of 270 km/h (167.8 mph).

The 753 delivered Porsche's only F1 win as a constructor at the 1962 French Grand Prix at Rouen-Les-Essarts, in an 804 driven by Dan Gurney.

The 753 influenced the design of the engine for Porsche's 901 project, that would become the 911.

== Type 771 ==
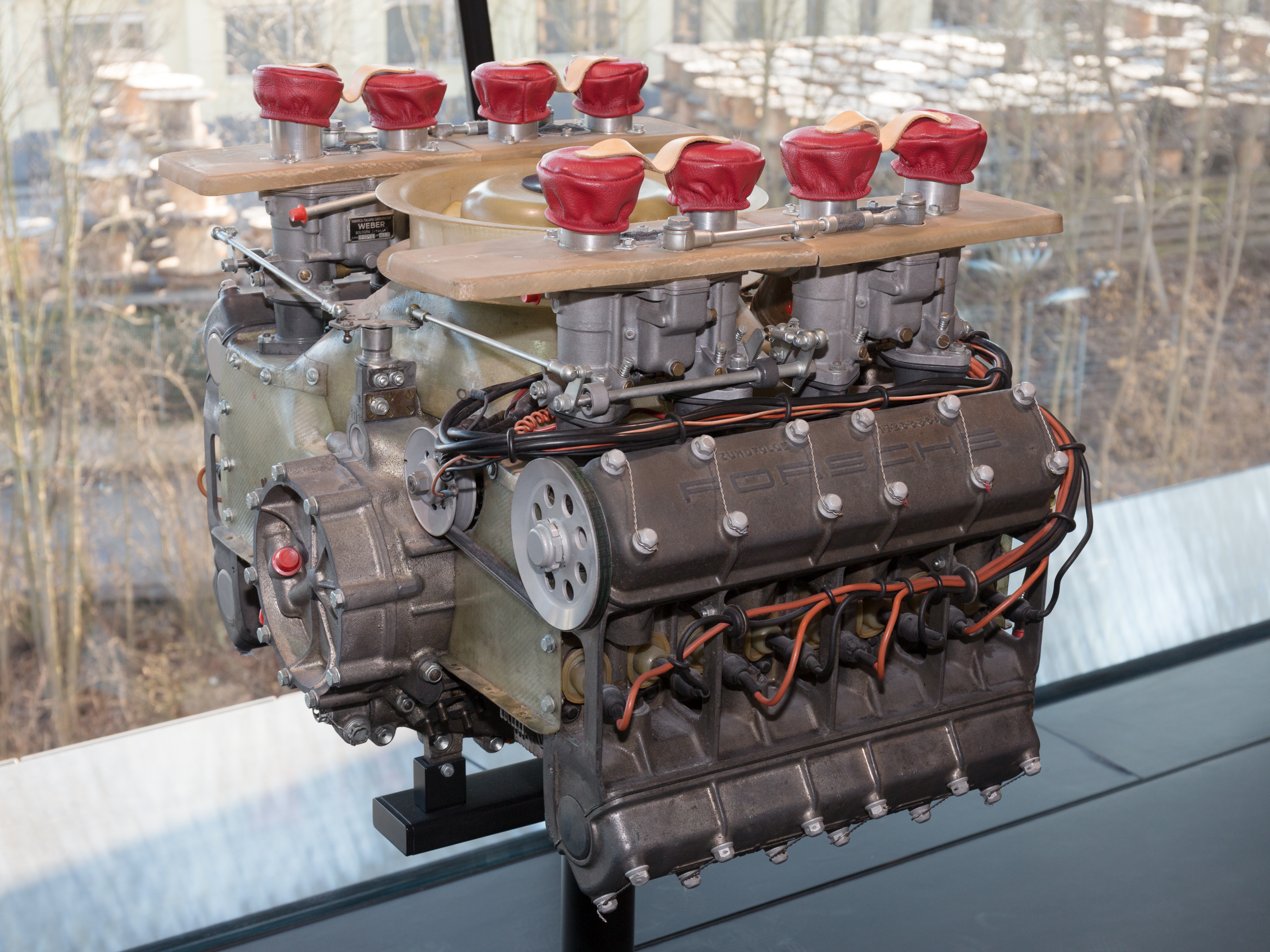
Porsche 771 engine at the Porsche Museum

A second version of the Porsche flat-eight meant for sports-racers and GTs in the 2 litre class was developed at the same time as the 753. This engine, designated Type 771, had a bore 10 mm (0.39 in) larger than the 753, resulting in an engine that displaced 1,982 cc (120.9 cu in). Carburetor bores were increased to 42 mm (1.7 in) Power output rose to 240 hp (179.0 kW). This engine was used in the 718, 904 (of the 16 904s kept by the factory, six were fitted with the eight-cylinder engine), 906, 910 and 907 sports-racer models as well as in the Porsche 909 Bergspyder, between 1962 and 1968.

=== Type 771/1 2.2 ===
Porsche decided to go also beyond the 2.0 liter class occaisonally, but the engine was nearly maxed out already. The version of the 771 enlarged to 2.2 L (134 cu in) was designated Type 771/1.

== Type 908 ==
The next flat-eight Porsche engine was not a further development of the Type 771, but rather a version of the Type 916 quad-cam six-cylinder racing engine with two additional cylinders. This engine first appeared in the Porsche 908 racers, and is called the Type 908 engine. The engine's internal dimensions were carried over from the Type 916, which had in turn inherited the measurements of the production 911 engine. Bore and stroke were 84 and 66 mm (3.3 and 2.6 in) respectively, for a total displacement of 2,926 cc (178.6 cu in). With a 10.4:1 compression ratio, power output for the early versions was 320 hp (238.6 kW).

The engine debuted at the 1968 Le Mans practice weekend on 6 April 1968. The 24h were postponed to September 1968 were the Porsche suffered from problems both with the alternator and the rules preventing its replacement, requiring repair. The 908, now as 908/02 open spyder, was successful in the 1969 World Sportscar Championship, came second in Le Mans. Replaced by the 917 on fast tracks, the 908/03 of 1970 was a more compact "Targa Special" for the Targa Florio and the Nürburgring. The engine had some 370 hp in its latest configurations. Privateers raced it after 1971.

Type 908 engines were also installed in two VW-Porsche 914/8 cars at the factory in 1969. The first was built by Ferdinand Piëch using a full-blown racing engine developing 298 hp (222 kW). The second received a detuned 261 hp (195 kW) version of the engine, and was given to Ferry Porsche as a gift on his 60th birthday. Called "914/8s", both are part of the collection at the Porsche Museum.

== Type 1966 ==
Another flat-eight engine design was related to Porsche internal project Type 1966, which corresponded to Volkswagen project EA266 of the late 1960s and early 1970s. The goal of EA266 was to develop a replacement for the Volkswagen Beetle. Volkswagen's prototypes used a rear mid-engine, rear-wheel-drive layout and were powered by a water cooled inline four cylinder engine with the cylinder bores laid over horizontally, mounted longitudinally under the rear passenger seat. Ferdinand Piëch envisioned the Type 1966 as the basis for a three-tiered replacement for the 911, with four-, eight-, and twelve-cylinder water cooled boxer engines mounted amidships. A design for a car with three-abreast seating was developed. A prototype flat-eight engine was also built for Piëch. The prototype engine was loosely based on the inline four developed for EA266, and included DOHC cylinder heads and two EA266 water cooled cylinder blocks on a common crankshaft. The new car was expected to be introduced in 1973. According to designer Anatole "Tony" Lapine, shortly after project EA266 was cancelled by Volkswagen all materials relating to the Type 1966 were destroyed, including the prototype engine.

== Type 988/960 ==
Rumours about another proposed Porsche flat-eight began to circulate in the mid-2010s. The mid-engined Porsche 988 (later renamed the 960) was to challenge the Ferrari 458 and Lamborghini Huracán models using a flat-eight engine that displaced 4 litres and was fitted with four turbochargers. Power output was projected to be in excess of 600 hp (450 kW). The 960 was expected to have been released in 2019, but some report that its release may have been pushed back as far as 2026.
