= Buffum =

Defunct American motor vehicle manufacturer

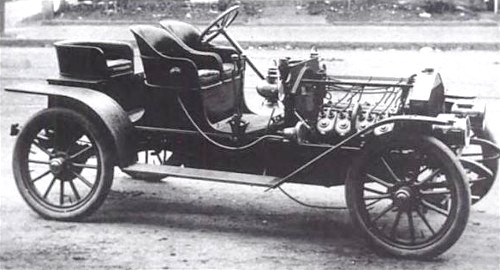
- 1905 Buffum Model F Runabout

Overview
- Manufacturer: H. H. Buffum & Co.
- Production: 1901–1906
- Assembly: United States: Abington, Massachusetts
- Designer: Herbert H. Buffum

The Buffum was an American automobile manufactured from 1901 until 1907 by the H.H. Buffum Co. of Abington, Massachusetts. The company also built a line of powered launches.

== History ==
Buffums built between 1901 and 1904 were powered by 4-cylinder engines, until the Model G Greyhound was introduced later in 1904. The Model G Greyhound was a racing model powered by two horizontal four-cylinder engines coupled together to make a flat-eight engine. The Greyhound was the first 8-cylinder car offered for sale in the United States. In 1906 another eight-cylinder powered car was offered for sale, although this time the engine was a V8.

== Models ==
Model	Years	Engine	ALAM horsepower	Wheelbase	Body	List price	Remarks
Stanhope	1894–1895	I4			Stanhope, 2 seats		
20 HP	1901–1903	F4	20 HP	94.5 in (2,400 mm)	Roi-des-Belges	US$2500	Some references report output was 16 hp.
Model H	1904	I4	28 HP	94.5 in (2,400 mm)	Tonneau	US$2500	
Model G	1904	F8		120.0 in (3,048 mm)	Racing car, 2 seats		Called Model G Greyhound or Central Greyhound. 80–100 bhp (59,7–79,6 kW) depending on source.
Model E	1905	F4	12 HP	86.0 in (2,184 mm)	Roadster, 2 seats	US$1200	
Model E	1905	F4	12 HP	86.0 in (2,184 mm)	Tonneau with detachable canopy	US$1350	Roadster with detachable Tonneau and fixed roof.
Model F	1905	I4	12 HP	86.0 in (2,184 mm)	Roadster, 3 seats	US$1200	
Model H	1905	I4	28 HP	105.0 in (2,667 mm)	Tonneau	US$4000	
Model K	1905	I4	28 HP	105.0 in (2,667 mm)	Touring	US$4000	
40 HP	1906–1907	V8	40 HP	100.0 in (2,540 mm)	Runabout, 2 seats	US$2500	
Hall 40 HP	1907	V8	40 HP	100.0 in (2,540 mm)	Runabout, 2 seats		
