= Porsche 908 =

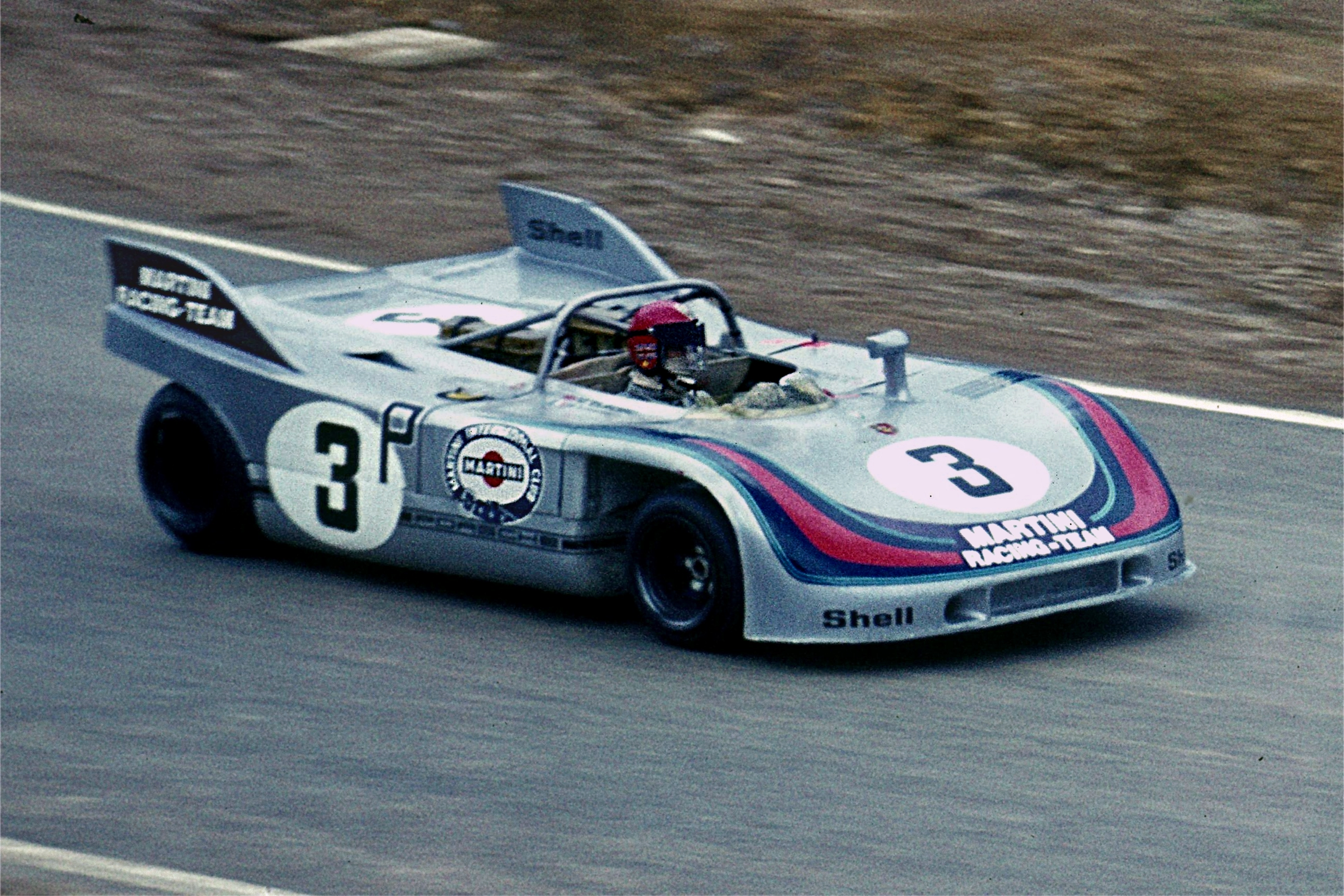
- Porsche 908/3 of 1971

Overview
- Manufacturer: Porsche
- Production: 1968–1971
- Designer: Helmuth Bott (chassis); Hans Mezger (engine)

Body and chassis
- Class: 1968–1971: Group 6 prototype-sports car 1972–1975: Group 5 sports car 1976–1981: Group 6 two-seater racing car
- Body style: Coupé spyder
- Layout: RMR

Powertrain
- Engine: 3.0 L flat 8 (908/01, 02, 03); 2.1 L turbocharged flat 6 (908/03)

Dimensions
- Length: 4,839 mm (190.5 in)
- Curb weight: 650 kg (1,430 lb)

Chronology
- Predecessor: Porsche 907
- Successor: Porsche 936

The Porsche 908 was a racing car from Porsche, introduced for the 1968 World Sportscar Championship as a 3 liter flat-8-cylinder prototype coupé. Raced successfully by the factory teams also in 1969, 1970 and 1971 as open top spyder versions /02 and /03, the 908 helped to win the World Championships of these years, along with the Porsche 917. With higher mandatory minimum weight for 1972, the nimble underpowered 908/03 were retired by the factory. Sold off to privateers, some old chassis had a comeback in 1975 when fitted with flat-6 turbo engines. The model number 908 was still raced with some success in the early 1980s with Porsche 936 bodywork, an unprecedented career in three decades.

The 1968 908 continued the 1964 904, 1966 906 and 1967 907 series of "plastic Porsche" models that had fiberglass bodywork rather than aluminium. Like in the 1950s, Porsche mainly competed for wins in the 2 liter classes, and for overall wins on twisty tracks like Targa Florio and Nürburgring.

After large engine cars achieved very high speeds in the 1967 Le Mans 24h race, the FIA announced rule changes for Group 6 prototype-sports cars limiting engine displacement to 3,000 cc, same as in Formula One since 1966. Thus, the 908 was designed by Helmuth Bott (chassis) and Hans Mezger (engine) under the leadership of racing chief Ferdinand Piëch as the first Porsche sports car prototype to have an engine with the maximum size allowed; but that was not the case as it turned out.

The previous Porsche 907 only had a 2,200 cc Type 771/1 flat-eight engine, derived from the 1962 1500cc F1 car, developing 270 PS (199 kW). The new 3-litre Type 908 flat-eight produced 350 PS (257 kW) at 8,400 rpm, later 370. Porsche still had ties with Volkswagen, thus it was traditionally air-cooled and with only two valves per cylinder. It had less power compared to more modern water cooled four valve F1 designs which delivered over 400 hp (300 kW), but these were not suited to endurance racing of 6 to 24 hours until the 1970s.

The first incarnation of the 908, sometimes referred to as 908 Langheck or 908LH, was a closed coupe to provide low drag at fast tracks. Even though half of the WC races in 1968 were won by Porsche 907 and later 908, some Gulf-Wyer-entered old Ford GT40 Mk.I from 1964 won Le Mans and the Championship. As well over 50 had been made to GT rules of the time, they were allowed to score WC points despite having engine sizes up to 5 liter. This "loop hole" was introduced due to a lack of 3 liter entries after the sudden rule changes; Ferrari remained absent in 1968 in protest, others struggled. When the FIA lowered the minimum number to 25 to include also the Lola T70 and some others in 1969, Porsche decided to build no less than 25 new cars, the Porsche 917 that had a 4.5 liter flat-12 version of the 908 flat-8. The Ferrari 512S followed.

After 1969 rules changes, the 908 was mainly raced as the 908/02, a lighter open spyder. It won many races and finally the WC, but the old Gulf-Wyer-Ford again won Le Mans, for a fourth Ford win. A more compact 908/03 was introduced in 1970 to complement the heavy Porsche 917K on twisty tracks that favored nimble cars, like the Targa Florio and Nürburgring. Of the four races in these two seasons, the 908/03, in fact the very same chassis 008, won three, missing out at the 1971 Targa.

Sold off to privateers for 1972, various 908s were entered until the early 1980s, often retro-fitted with Porsche 934-based 2.1-litre turbocharged flat-six engines.

== 908 (1968) ==
The 908 was not ready for the first three rounds of the 1968 World Sportscar Championship, but Porsche won the North American rounds anyway in convincing manner thanks to the 2.2 litre variant of the Porsche 907. Five were entered for the 1968 24 Hours of Daytona, with a 1-2-3 and a DNF for the factory and a DNF for a private Swiss car. One car less at 1968 12 Hours of Sebring, and a 1-2.

In 1968, for an unknown reason, the Le Mans test weekend coincided with the first European round, the 1968 6h BOAC International 500 World Championship Sports Car Race at Brands Hatch, and with the Formula 2 event at the Hockenheimring on Sunday April 7 in which Jim Clark was killed. Jacky Ickx set the test benchmark for JWA, with a 3:35.4 lap, then promptly left for Brands Hatch to win the endurance race. The test was also the first appearance of the new Porsche 908, in the hands of Rolf Stommelen. It was found to need major aerodynamic refinement, but Stommelen eventually got a time of 3:44.1. In the 6h race, with the best 907 suffering brake failure, the updated old 4.7-litre Wyer-Ford GT40s Group 4 sports car won 22 seconds ahead of the better of two 907 Group 6 prototypes with half the engine capacity.

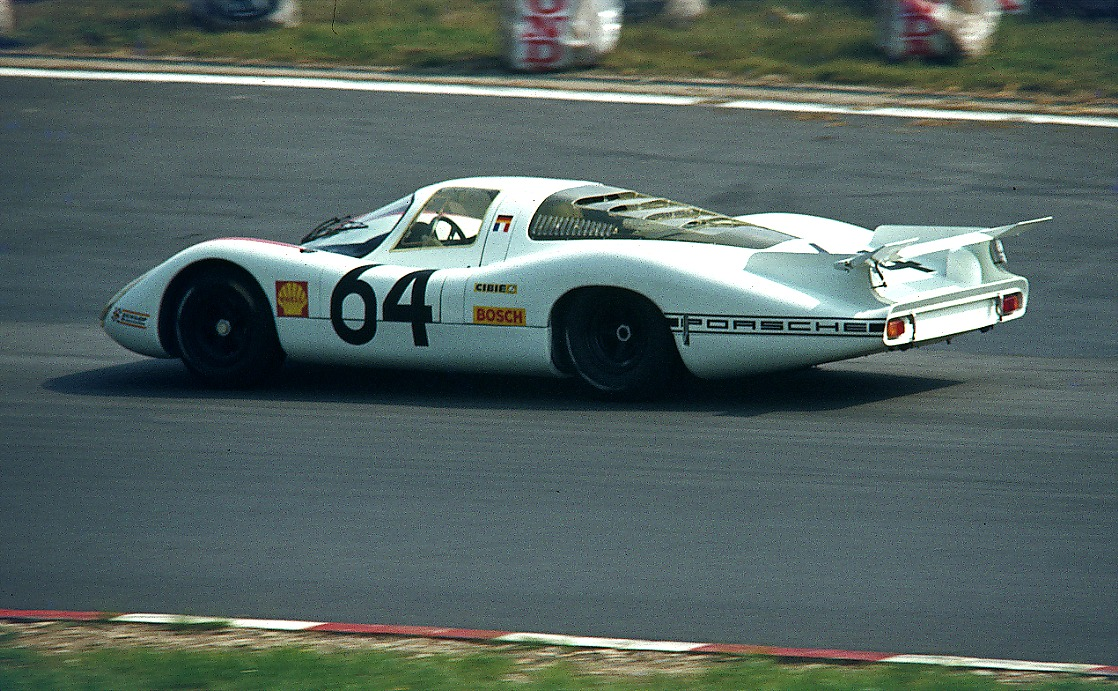
Herrmann's No. 64 Porsche 908 with long tail bodywork, runner up at Le Mans 1969, shown at the Nürburgring in 1981

The Porsche 908 was introduced at the first of three very fast race tracks on which the full engine capacity was needed, the 1968 1000km Monza. It was run on the 10 km long interleaved oval with high bankings, and in absence of Italian challengers, as Ferrari did not enter at all in 1968 and Alfa did not arrive. The two 908 had teething problems and finished 11th and 19th. Once again a Wyer-Ford was narrowly ahead of a 907 2.2 LH.

At the twisty track of the 1968 Targa Florio, Porsche did not enter the new 908 as they did not have to worry about heavy Fords, but about no less than five Alfa Romeo Tipo 33/2, one of them with the 2.5 litre engine. The effort of Vic Elford saved the win for Porsche in a 907.

The 908 finally scored its maiden win at the 1968 1000km Nürburgring, backed up by a 907, ahead of the Wyer-GT40. This order was reversed a week later at the 1968 1000km Spa, in which Ickx dominated in the rain.

Even though the 907 were proven, Porsche only brought 908s to the July 14, 1968 6h of Watkins Glen, and hired support from some American and even a Japanese driver. One 908 was over-revved early, two others had all kind of drama like a driver getting sick in the hot closed coupe and finally DNF after wheel bearing trouble. At the end, two Wyer-Fords were on the podium, plus a Howmet TX, and two private Porsche 906 sportscars were ahead of the lone surviving 908.

Only the five best results would count towards the World Championship, and both Porsche and Ford had earned four victories each. As the next event, the 500km at Zeltweg, only was worth half points, it was a rather meaningless win for two 908, while two others once again had troubles. It all came down to the last race, the 1968 24 Hours of Le Mans, which due to political unrest had been postponed from the traditional mid-June date to September.

In April 1968 it had been announced that for 1969, the minimum production requirement for the 5,000 cc Group 4 sports car category will be reduced from 50 units to 25. That had the side effect of homologating the numerous old Porsche 910 prototypes to Gr. 4 sportscars, making them available for class wins in the hand of privateers. In July 1968, Porsche decided to go one step further: enlarge the 3.0-litre Porsche Type 908 Flat-8 engine to a 4.5-litre Flat-12 fittingly named Porsche Type 912 engine, and build the required 25 examples of the new 12-cylinder car, the Porsche 917 (Porsche 912 was already in use for an entry-level flat-4 911). This risky investment was expected to take up to a year, though, and the 908 was supposed to deliver results in the meantime.

The stage for a showdown at Le Mans between the 908s and the Wyer-GT40s was set, for race win and Championship. The Porsche 908 LHs (long tails) were the fastest in qualifying and the early stages of the race, but it showed that Porsche had not taken advantage of the additional time to improve the reliability of the 908. Troubles with the alternator caused delays and even disqualifications as the new Porsche team leaders had misinterpreted the rules that required repair of the faulty part, not replacement. Once again, a V8-powered Ford won, and an older smaller private Swiss 907 LT came in second in front of the sole surviving standard 908 of the factory. In addition, Ford won the 1968 International Championship for Makes.

== 908/02 (1969) ==
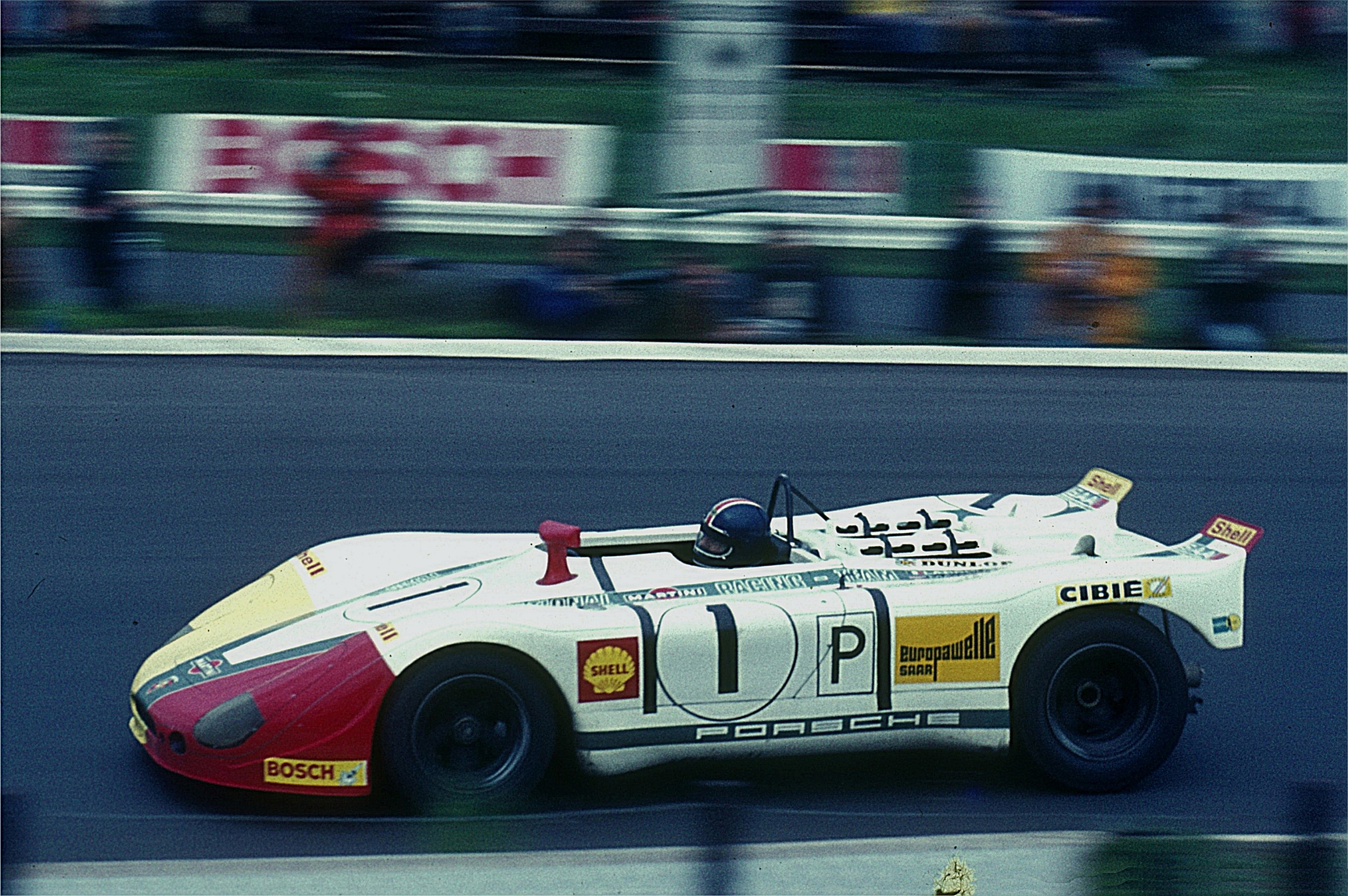
Porsche 908/02 of 1969

For 1969, the Group 6 prototype rules were changed, now favouring open top cars over coupés. Most teams altered their cars accordingly. Porsche lowered the weight of the 908, removed the roof and the long tails, to get the new version called Porsche 908/02 spyder by 100 kg (220 lb). Aluminium tube frames were used, with air pressure gauges to check them.

The 1969 24 Hours of Daytona was a disaster for Porsche, as all three 908/02 failed, while the Penske-entered Lola T70 sportscar won. At the 1969 12 Hours of Sebring, a Ford GT40 defeated a trio of factory-entered 908/02s.

At that time, the more powerful Porsche 917 was introduced in Geneva, but it took until May for homologation to be approved and in effect. Now that it seemed that the career of the 908 was over, the 908/02 started to succeed. The next race was the BOAC 500 at Brands Hatch, where the 908 was finally successful, finishing 1-2-3 ahead of a Ferrari 312P. With additional wins at the 1000km Monza, the Targa Florio, the 1000km Spa and an overwhelming 1-2-3-4-5 at the 1000km Nürburgring, the 1969 International Championship for Makes was secured early for Porsche by the 908/02, while the Porsche 917 suffered teething problems mainly due to aerodynamics. Due to failure of wings in Formula One, these had been banned by the FIA, affecting also the 917.

However, the prestigious 24 hours of Le Mans was in 1969 again won by the same Wyer-Ford GT40 chassis, as the 917s had gearbox troubles after leading for many hours. Still, a 908 challenged for the win, as Hans Herrmann came in as a very close second, behind Jacky Ickx. Herrmann's 908 low drag coupé was fast on the straights, but near the race's end the brake pads wore down, indicated by a light that was introduced with the 908s. The team gambled on not changing the pads, which allowed Ickx to pass under braking.

The 908/02 in which Steve McQueen finished second at the 1970 12 Hours of Sebring was also used as a camera car for the Le Mans film in the race itself. McQueen originally intended to drive a Porsche 917 in the race, though this was vetoed by the studio funding the film.

== 908/03 (1970) ==
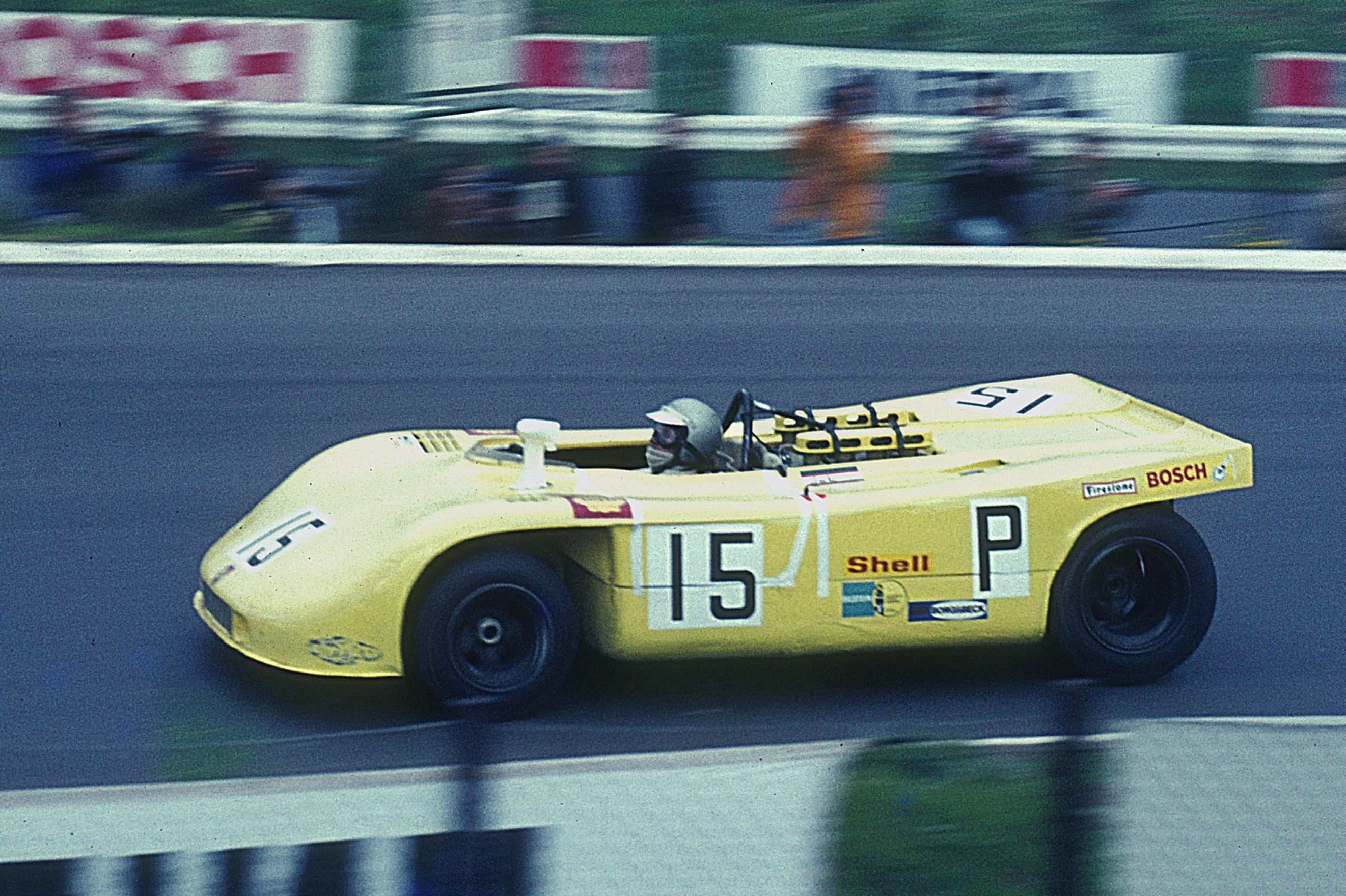
Porsche 908/03 in 1970 (Hans Herrmann)

Despite the more powerful 917 improving towards the end of 1969, the career of the 908 continued for the 1970 World Sportscar Championship. On rather twisty and slow tracks like Nürburgring and Targa Florio, the 917 was not suited well even after being modified to the 917K. So rather than trying to make "one size fit all", Porsche built dedicated cars for each type of racing track. Based upon the lightweight and short Porsche 909 which was used in hillclimbing, the new open cockpit version, the 908/03, was even shorter than the 908/02, and only weighed 500 kg (1,100 lb) - very light for a long-distance racing car. By comparison, the 917K weighed about 840 kg (1,850 lb). The 908/03 was so short that the driver's legs projected ahead of the front wheels.

In May 1970, this version, in fact the very same chassis #008, was successful in the 1970 Nürburgring 1000 km and the Targa Florio, where typical speeds were only about half of the top speed of 240 mph (390 km/h) which the 917LH long tails could achieve at Le Mans.

At the Targa, the car was given to JWA, painted in Gulf blue and as #12 with two red arrows, driven by Jo Siffert / Brian Redman to victory. Other 908/03 came in 2nd, 4th and 5th, with one DNF, and two only used for training due to lack of drivers. In addition, an old 908/02 was entered by Martini.

Four weeks later at the Ring, #008 was entered by Porsche Salzburg as plain white #22, with Vic Elford and Kurt Ahrens leading a 1-2 finish after two JWA had crashed out, with no less than four 908/02 coming 4-5-6-7.

== 908/03 (1971) ==
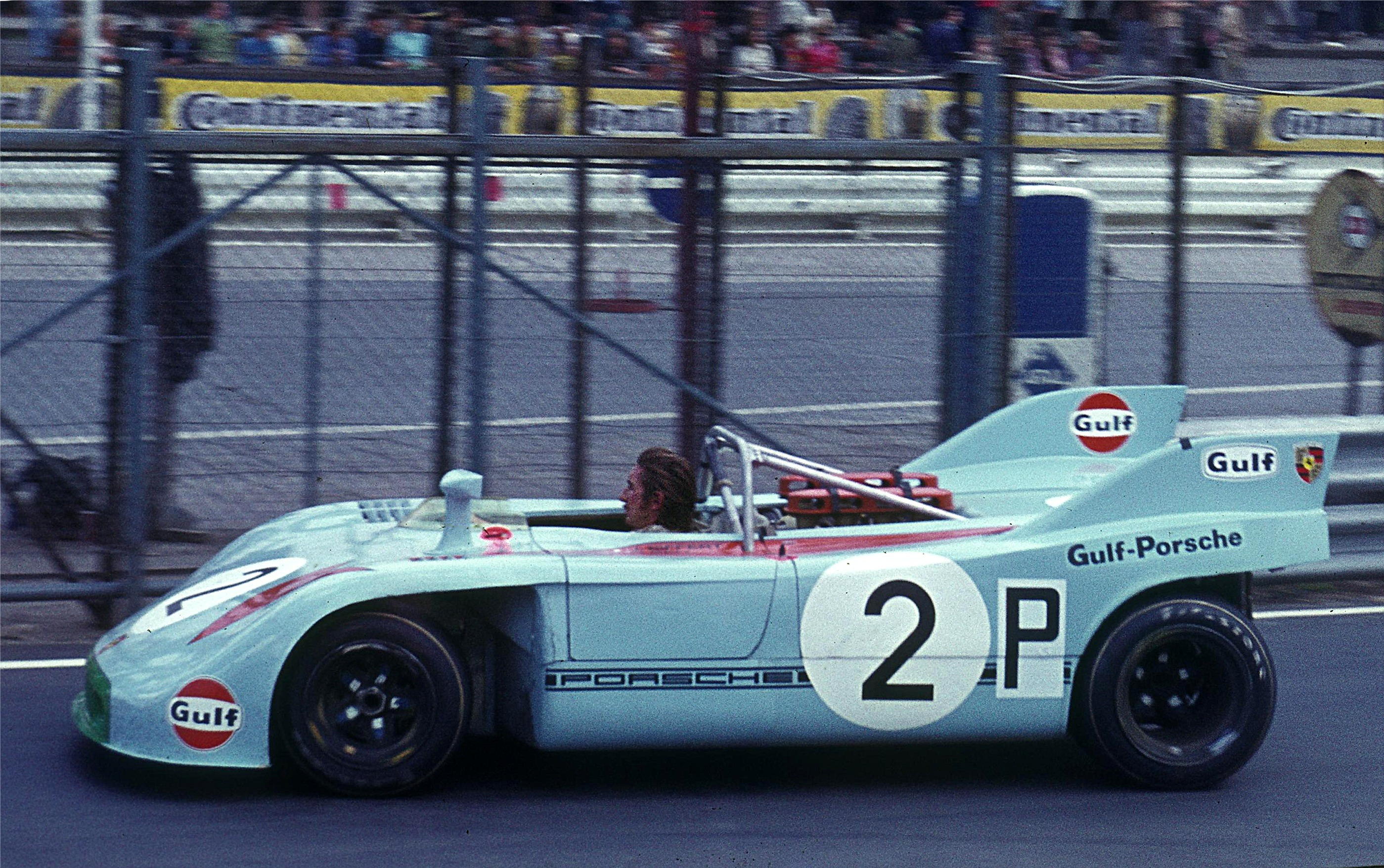
Porsche 908/03 of 1971, with fins (Jo Siffert)

For the 1971 World Sportscar Championship, vertical fins were added to the rear of the 908/03 (similar to the 1971 917K), which now also sported larger roll bars.

=== Targa Florio ===
One week after the Spa 1000km the more nimble 908/03s were needed again for the twisty tracks of the Targa Florio and the 1000km Nürburgring two weeks later. With already five wins by the 917K cars that season, less effort than usual was invested for the unusual kind of race on public mountain roads. Only three 908/03 cars were brought to Sicily, a number that proved too low - or too high. All entered 908/03s eventually crashed. The two JWA were out on the first lap; Brian Redman was badly injured after a fiery crash. Vic Elford in the Martini-entered #008 did manage to set the fastest lap and was classified 39th despite a late crash. Winner of the 1971 Targa Florio was local hero Nino Vaccarella leading a 1-2 by Alfa Romeo and their Tipo 33s, with Gijs van Lennep driving the 2nd place Alfa instead of a fourth 908 before driving for Porsche again two weeks later, and winning the 1971 Le Mans in the Martini 917K four weeks later.

=== 1000km Nürburgring ===
Within two weeks, two crashed 908/03 had to be repaired for the race at the Nürburgring. The totaled car of Redman as well as the hospitalized driver had to be replaced, as a fourth chassis was needed to give JWA and Martini two good cars each. All German cars arrived late at the Ring, which had been resurfaced and modernized, while the Italians were already going fast. The single new flat-12 Ferrari 312PB of Jacky Ickx and Clay Regazzoni was on pole by no less than 9 seconds and led the race for six laps when engine troubles started. The still bumpy Ring also broke engine mounts in the JWA-908 of Siffert/Bell, with Siffert continuing in the other JWA car of Rodriguez. The sole fast Alfa of Stommelen/Galli led until lap 14 in which the engine failed, followed by the same fate for the leading Ferrari in lap 21 of 44. "Quick" Vic Elford had been hunting them in the air-cooled two valve Martini-908 chassis #008 which had less power than the V12. The race saw a 1-2-3 finish for the works 908/03 in front of two less competitive Alfas and a private 917K. One of the several private Ferrari 512S finished 9th among three private 908/02.

== End of the factory program ==
With the combination of the powerful 917K and the lightweight 908 in various variants, entering two factory backed teams plus supporting privateers and GT cars, Porsche dominated the International Championship for Makes each year from 1969 to 1971. With new rules in effect in 1972, large engine "sportscars" like the 917K were no longer allowed. A higher minimum weight for prototypes negated the main advantage the underpowered 908/03 had.

With Alfas scoring additional wins at Brands Hatch and Watkins Glen in 1971, and Ferrari developing the 312PB, it was proven that these nimble three litre prototypes could beat the 917Ks and 908s also outside of the Targa or the Nürburgring.

Porsche decided to end its 20-year history of factory sports car racing and sold the 908/03 cars to customers. Besides developing the 917/10 turbo for the Can Am series, the Zuffenhausen-based company focused on the development of the already aging Porsche 911, testing the 911 flat-six with turbochargers.

== 1972–1981 ==
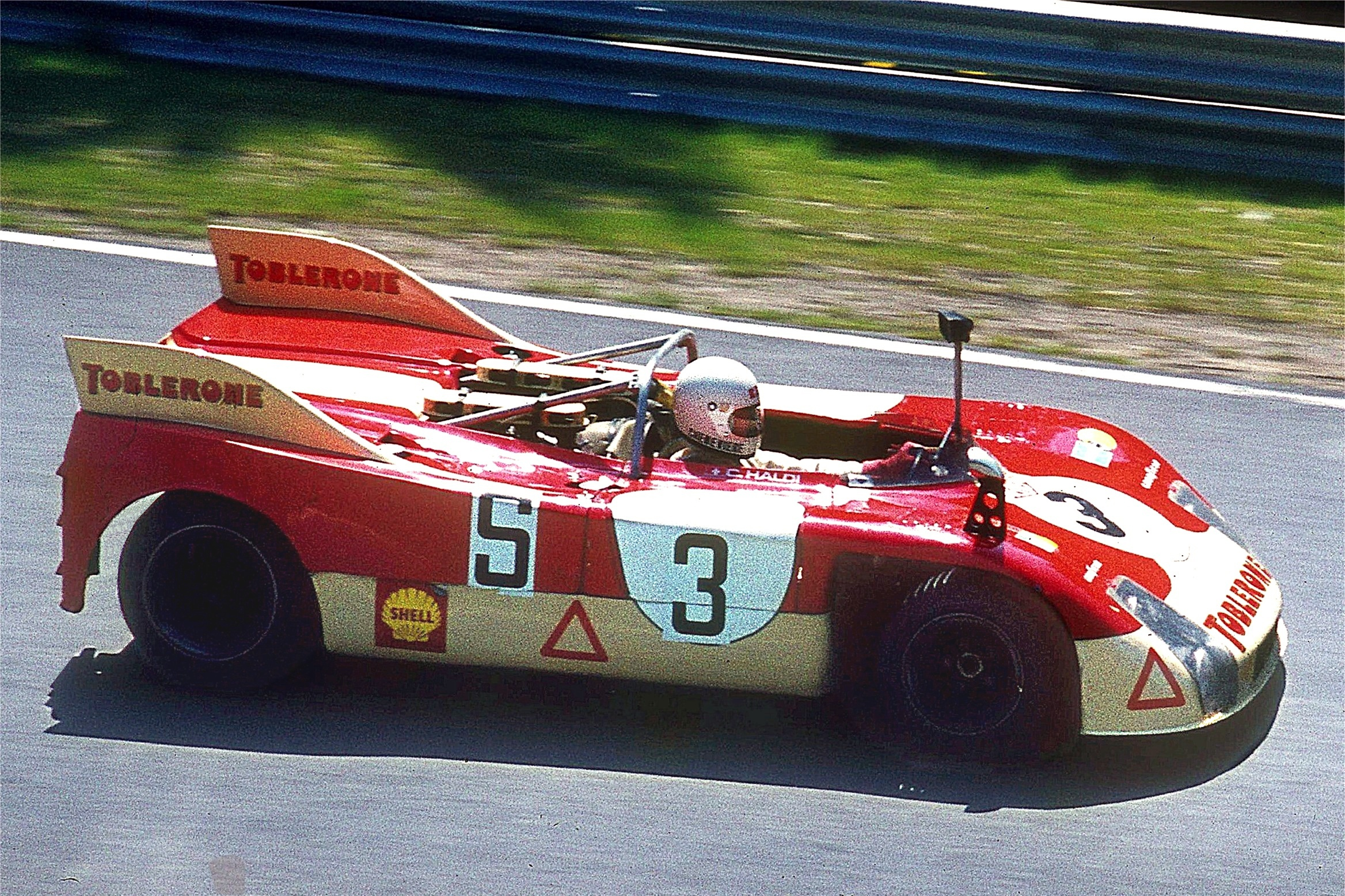
Porsche 908/03, privately entered in 1973

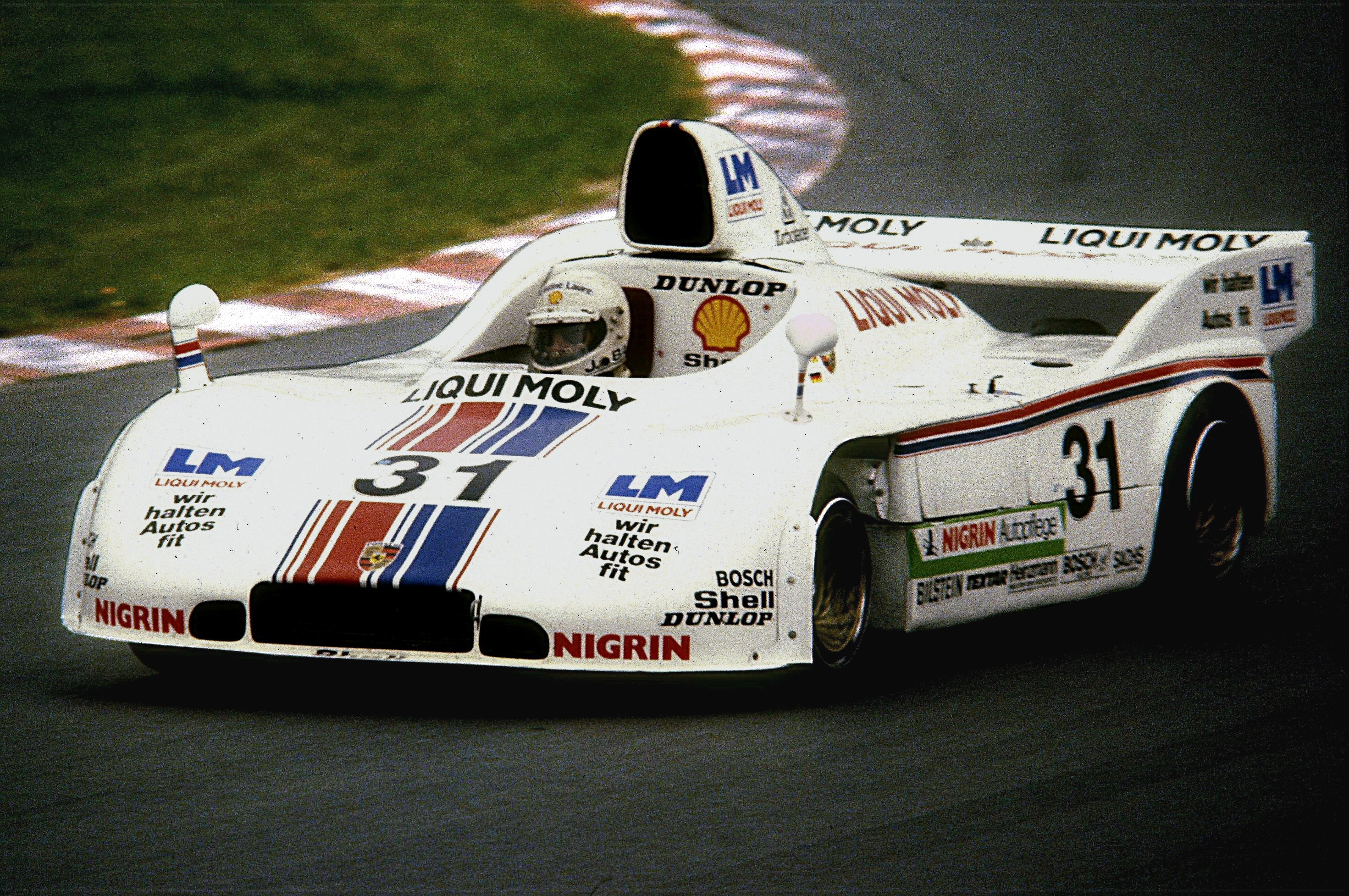
Porsche 908.3 turbo of 1980, with airbox for the intercooler

For 1972, the 5,000 cc Group 5 sports car category was discontinued, and the 917 and its main rival, the Ferrari 512, became obsolete, as did Lola T70, Ford GT40 and others. In the 3,000 cc category, renamed "Group 5 sports cars", Porsche's main advantage had been their low weight, as the engine was underpowered with 370 PS (272 kW). The new rules required a much higher weight (650 kg (1,430 lb)) than Porsche could achieve (well under 600 kg (1,300 lb)), giving the advantage to the Ferrari 312PB, Alfa Romeo T33TT and Matra with their more powerful F1-derived V12 engines that had 420 hp (310 kW) or more, even in endurance trim.

A three-year-old Porsche 908LH coupé was entered by Reinhold Joest in the 1972 24 Hours of Le Mans, finishing third. Customers continued to race several 908/03s, fitted with extra weight as required by the rules.

In 1975, some 908s were fitted with turbocharged engines, similar to those used in the Porsche 934 GT car, but downsized. Even with 2.1-litre and a turbo factor of 1.4, the turbos by now outpowered normally aspirated 3-litre engines. Taking advantage of that, in 1976 the factory developed the Porsche 936 to compete in the new Group 6 two-seater racing car category that replaced the Group 5 sports car class. Unlike the 934 and 935, Porsche did not offer the 936 for sale, entering it in a few races only, mostly at Le Mans. Several customer 908s were upgraded with 936-style bodywork, though. The Porsche 908/80 turbo of Joest and Ickx, which finished second in the 1980 24 Hours of Le Mans, turned out later to have a real Porsche 936 chassis.

== Legacy ==
The 908 won the 1000 km Nürburgring in three different decades, winning four years in a row from 1968 to 1971 and again in 1980, utilizing turbocharging for its final victory. Some 908s are still raced currently in competitions such as the Classic Endurance Racing (CER) series.

== Versions ==
=== 908 LH coupé 1968 ===
- 2,990 cc 8-cyl engine
- 350 PS (257 kW)
- Top speed: 320 km/h (200 mph)
- Closed cockpit
- Long tail bodywork for fast tracks

=== 908/02 spyder 1969 ===
- 2,990 cc 8-cyl engine
- 350 PS (257 kW)
- Top speed: 290 km/h (180 mph)
- Open cockpit
- Low weight (no minimum weight given by rules)
- Short tail bodywork for twisty and slow tracks

=== 908/03 spyder 1970–1971 ===
- 2,990 cc 8-cyl engine
- 370 PS (272 kW)
- Top speed: 290 km/h (180 mph)
- Open cockpit
- Shorter wheelbase
- Lower weight
- New bodywork, also with rear fins in 1971

=== 908/03 Spyder turbo 1975–1981 ===
- 1971 factory cars sold to customer teams
- Modified by teams and in factory
- 2,140 cc 6-cyl turbo engines
- Over 500 hp
