= Ferrari 212 E Montagna =

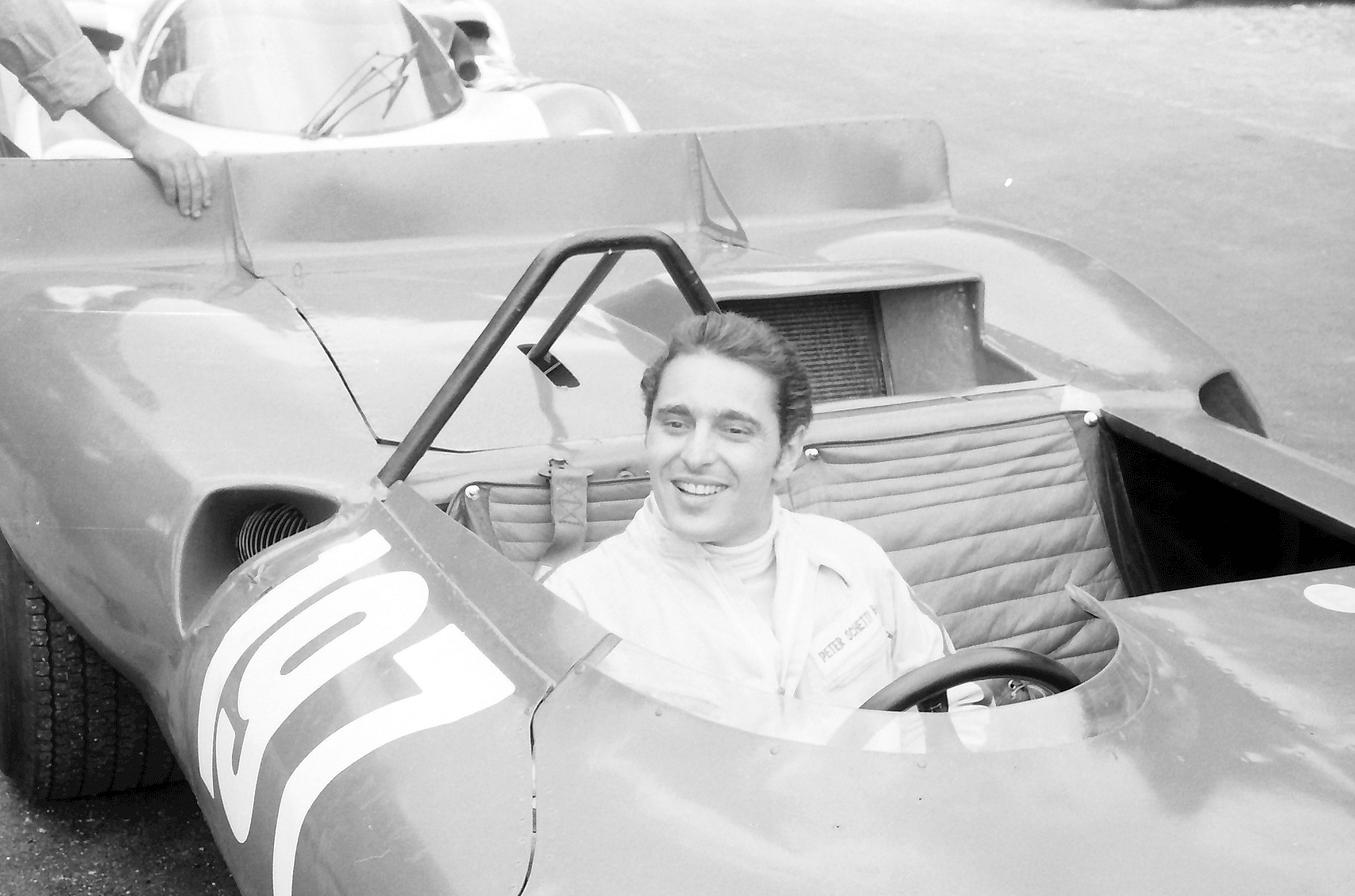
- Category: Sports prototype
- Constructor: Ferrari
- Predecessor: Ferrari 1512
- Successor: Ferrari 312PB

Technical specifications
- Chassis: Tubular steel
- Suspension (front): Independent, unequal-length wishbones, coil springs, telescopic shock absorbers, anti-roll bar
- Suspension (rear): Independent, unequal-length wishbones, coil springs, telescopic shock absorbers, anti-roll bar
- Length: 3,800 mm (149.6 in)
- Width: 1,980 mm (78.0 in)
- Axle track: 1,377 mm (54.2 in) front 1,412 mm (55.6 in) rear
- Wheelbase: 2,340 mm (92.1 in)
- Engine: Tipo 232 1,991 cc (121.5 cu in) flat-12, naturally-aspirated, mid-mounted
- Transmission: Ferrari 5-speed manual
- Weight: 500–530 kg (1,102.3–1,168.4 lb)
- Tyres: 5.00-10.00-13 front 6.00-14.00-13 rear

Competition history
- Notable entrants: Scuderia Ferrari
- Notable drivers: Peter Schetty; Edoardo Lualdi-Gabardi
- Debut: Ampus hill climb, March 30, 1969
Races	Wins	Poles	F/Laps
16	14	N/A	N/A

The Ferrari 212 E Montagna was a one-off spyder sports racing car produced by Ferrari in 1968. The car was built on a Dino 206 S chassis and used a unique 2-litre, 48-valve, flat-12 engine, a development of the 1512 1.5-litre Formula One engine. Driven by Peter Schetty, the car dominated the 1969 European Hill Climb Championship, placing first in every race it entered and setting many course records.

== Development history ==
In 1964, Ferrari developed the Tipo 207 1.5- litre flat-twelve engine for its 1512 F1 car. This basic design by Mauro Forghieri was modified by Stefano Jacoponi to create the Tipo 232 2-litre engine used in the 212 E. Overall capacity of this engine was 1990.08 cc, bore and stroke was 65 mm × 50 mm (2.56 in × 1.97 in) and the compression ratio was 11:1. Initially, the engine produced approximately 280-290 bhp at 11,500 rpm. Two units of the Tipo 232 motor were produced, with the first scrapped following initial development and dyno testing. The second Tipo 232 engine was installed in the 1967 Sport 2000, a testbed car based on a 206 S Dino chassis (number 020). This car was tested in late 1967 by Chris Amon at Modena and announced as a contender in the 1968 European Hill Climb Championship, but did not compete that season. Instead, this chassis was subsequently used (with a different Ferrari V12 drivetrain) in the Pininfarina 250 P5 show car, displayed at the Geneva, Los Angeles and Turin auto shows in 1968.

Dino chassis 020 and the Tipo 232 motor were reunited in late 1968, when Scuderia Ferrari decided to develop the Sport 2000 into the 212 E, under the supervision of Forghieri. The car was not considered reliable enough to compete in endurance events and was instead optimized to race the short, winding courses of the European Hill Climb Championship. Peter Schetty was chosen to test and race the 212 E. Schetty was an experienced hill climb racer and test driver who would later become Scuderia Ferrari team manager. Following testing at Modena and Vallelunga, the 212 E was modified from its Sport 2000 specification. Headlights were removed, fuel capacity was reduced and the car's plastic body was modified to optimize aerodynamics and weight for hillclimbs. Engine output and cooling systems were also improved. Power output at the start of the 1969 racing season varied from 300 to 320 hp (221 to 235 kW) depending on tune. The 212 E was also equipped with inboard rear disc brakes, in order to reduce unsprung mass. Overall weight was 500 kg (1,102 lb). As the 212 E, the car was given serial number 0862.

The numerical designation "212" refers to the 2-liter 12-cylinder engine, with the "E Montagna" designating its role as a racer in the "Europeo Montagna" Championship. The name is similar, but not a direct reference, to that of the 1950s Ferrari 212 Export.

== Racing history ==
Scuderia Ferrari entered the 212 E in the 1969 European Hillclimb Championship with Peter Schetty driving, supported by Ferrari engineer Gianni Marelli and two mechanics. Racing in the sport class, the car dominated the competition, winning every race in which it was entered. Minor modifications of gearing, aerodynamics and suspension setup were made during the season to adapt the car for each course. After seven victories, including six absolute course records, the team withdrew from the final race of the season as they had already clinched the championship. The 212 E's dominance in 1969 was ensured by the lack of any viable rival, with the nearest competition the Abarth 2000 driven by Arturo Merzario with 50 fewer horsepower. However, the car's overall speed was undeniable, evidenced by the course record Schetty set at Côte de Cesana-Sestrière, which remained unbroken for 13 years.

The car did not compete in 1970, although there was tremendous interest during this time from various drivers who wished to purchase the car from the factory. Ferrari eventually sold the car in late 1970 to Edoardo Lualdi-Gabardi, who commissioned the factory to fit a new body designed by Piero Lardi Ferrari. The original 212 E bodywork was subsequently fitted to a Dino 206 S, with which it still remains. Lualdi-Gabardi successfully raced the 212 E in hill climbs during the 1971 season.

== Significance ==
The 212 E Montagna is historically significant due to its competition success and unique engine, as well as the chassis' use in the Pininfarina 250 P5 show car. Forghieri considered the 212 E and its Tipo 232 engine as a test platform and important developmental step towards the 1970s 312B F1 cars and 312PB sports racers, which used a newly designed Tipo 001 3.0-litre flat-12 engine.

The 212 E Montagna sold to a private buyer at RM's 2006 Scottsdale auction for $1,650,000.
