= Flat-eight engine =

Piston engine

A flat-eight engine (also known as a horizontally-opposed eight) is an eight-cylinder piston engine with two banks of four inline cylinders, one on each side of a central crankshaft, 180° apart.

In a flat-eight engine, the connecting rods for corresponding pistons from the left and right banks may share a crankshaft journal. A boxer-eight engine is a special case of a flat-eight where each piston's connecting rod has its own journal, and each pair of opposed pistons moves inwards or outwards at the same time.

Flat-eight engines have been used in automotive, motorcycle, aircraft, and marine applications.

== Design ==
The advantages of a flat-eight engine are its minimal length and low centre of mass. A disadvantage is its greater width compared to a V8 or inline-eight engine. A flat-eight engine is able to have perfect primary balance and secondary balance.

A boxer-eight engine has a single piston per crankpin, which increases the linear offset between the cylinder banks. A boxer-eight with nine main bearings may be thought of as two boxer-four engines laid end-to-end with a 90° phase angle between their crankshafts.

Alternatively, a flat-eight engine where corresponding pistons from the two opposing banks share a crankshaft journal is often called a "180 degree V engine". One possible configuration for this design uses a two-plane crankshaft. Another configuration uses a 180° single-plane crankshaft with the leading and trailing crankpins in the same position, while the two central crankpins are in the opposite position.

== Use in automobiles ==
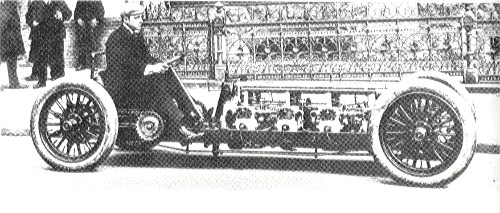
Buffum Model G Greyhound

One of the earliest flat-eight engines was used in the 1904 Buffum Model G Greyhound racing car, which used an engine based on two of Buffum's existing flat-four engines joined together. The Model G was built in the United States and was introduced one year after the Winton Motor Carriage Company Bullet No. 2, which used a straight-8 engine. Around the same time, the first V8 engines were beginning to appear in Europe.

Several racing cars have used bespoke flat-eight engines based on two inline-four engines and a custom crankshaft. These include the 1928 Anderson Specials Number 2 built in Scotland using two Humber 9/20 engines. The car is on display at the Kelvingrove Art Gallery and Museum in Glasgow. Another example is a 1977 Eagle 72 chassis raced by Bruce Crower in the United States. This engine used the cylinder heads from two Chevrolet Cosworth Vega engines. In 1969, a one-off engine was built for racing driver Emerson Fittipaldi to compete in the Thousand Miles of Guanabara endurance race. This flat-eight engine was made by joining two 1.3 L Volkswagen flat-four crankcases with an elastomeric gasket and connecting the two crankshafts together. Several similar Volkswagen-based engines were built for Fittipaldi's racing cars in the early 1970s.

=== Porsche ===
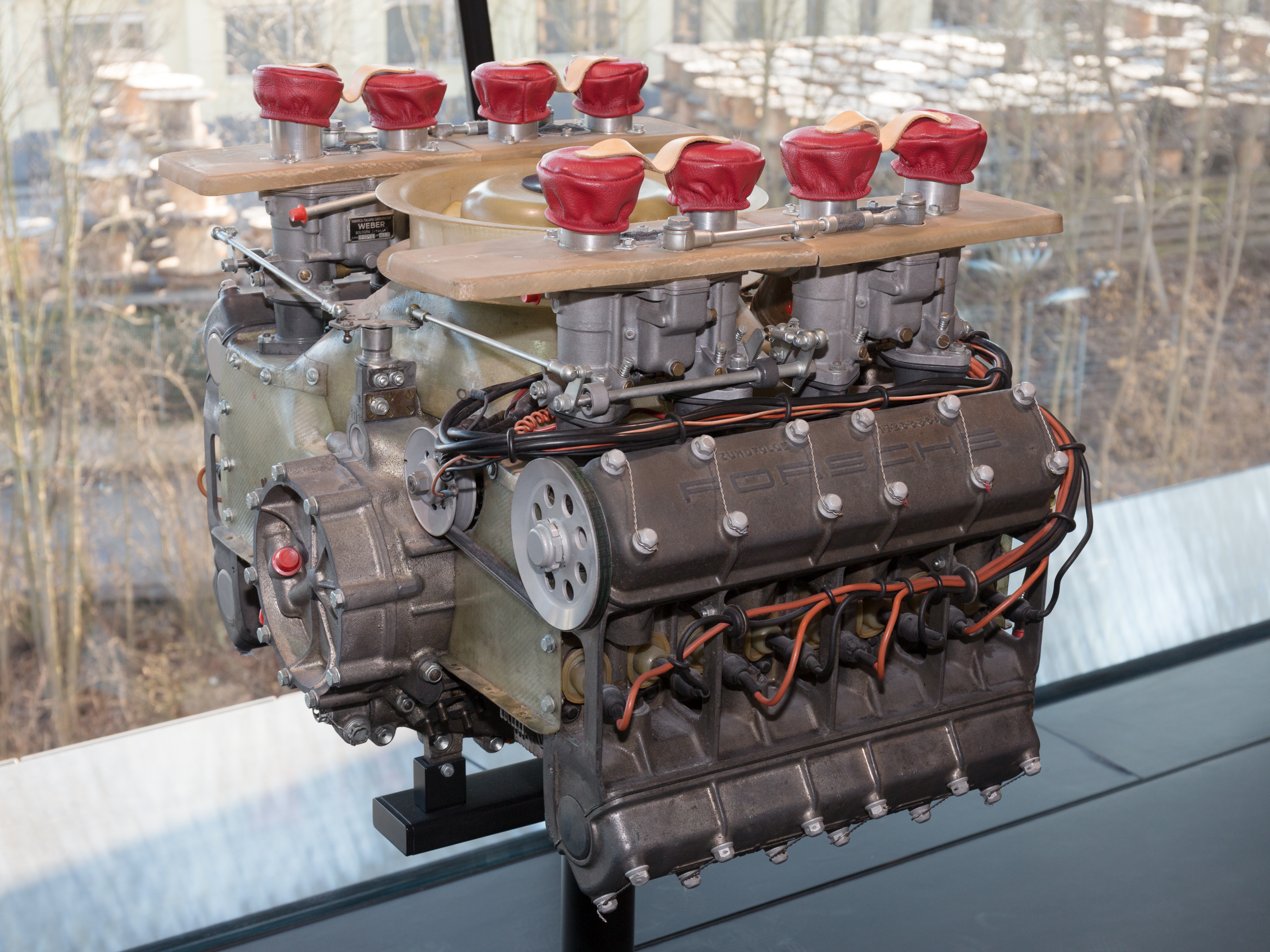
Porsche 771 engine

Porsche used flat-eight engines in various racing cars throughout the 1960s.

The first Porsche flat-eight was the Type 753. Work began on it in 1960, following the announcement of a 1.5 L (92 cu in) displacement limit for the 1961 Formula One season. Designed by Hans Mezger and Hans Honich, the engine includes features shaft-driven double-overhead camshafts, a two-piece magnesium crankcase casting, eight individual finned cylinder barrels, a solid crankshaft running in nine main bearings and Lucas electronic ignition. The version of the Type 753 used for its debut at the 1962 Dutch Formula One Grand Prix produced 138 kW (185 hp). At the 1962 French Grand Prix, the Type 753 engine delivered Porsche's only F1 race win as a constructor, in an 804 driven by Dan Gurney. The 753 also influenced the design of the flat-six engine used in the first-generation Porsche 911.

A 2.0 L (122 cu in) version of the Porsche flat-eight, designated the Type 771, was developed alongside the Type 753. This engine was intended for sports car and endurance racing, and was used in the Porsche 718 W-RS, Porsche 904/8), Porsche 906, Porsche 907, Porsche 909 and Porsche 910 racing cars between 1962 and 1968. A version of the Type 771 enlarged to 2.2 L (134 cu in) was designated Type 771/1.

In 1968, a new flat-eight engine called the Type 908 was introduced in the Porsche 908, which competed in the Group 6 Prototype-Sports Cars category. The Type 908 was not based on the Type 771, but instead the Type 916 flat-six racing six-cylinder engine with two additional cylinders. Porsche also installed Type 908 engines into two Porsche 914/8 mid-engined road cars. The first of these was a concept study built by the head of the racing department, and the second was built as a 60th birthday present for the company chairman.

Although Porsche never produced any road cars with a flat-eight engine, a prototype of such an engine was built in the late 1960s and early 1970s. During this time, Porsche had been commissioned by Volkswagen to develop "Project EA266", a replacement for the Volkswagen Beetle. Project EA266 was powered by a water-cooled inline-four engine which was mounted longitudinally under the rear passenger seat with the cylinders oriented horizontally. Porsche investigated using the Project EA266 chassis as the basis for a mid-engined replacement for the Porsche 911 called the "Typ 1966". As part of the Typ 1966 development process, a prototype water-cooled flat-eight engine was built. However, Project EA266 was cancelled by Volkswagen, all materials relating to the Typ 1966 were destroyed, including the prototype flat-eight engine.

=== Runge Cars ===
In 2025 Runge Cars announced air-cooled 5.3-liter flat-eight engine Runge Hetzer. The engine was designed for the new ultra-lightweight, mid-engined supercar Runge R3. However, it also corresponds to a direct bolt-in fit for air-cooled Porsche 911 platforms.

== Use in motorcycles ==
A 2.0-litre flat-eight engine is used in Great Wall Motor's Souo S2000 touring motorcycle.

== Use in aircraft ==
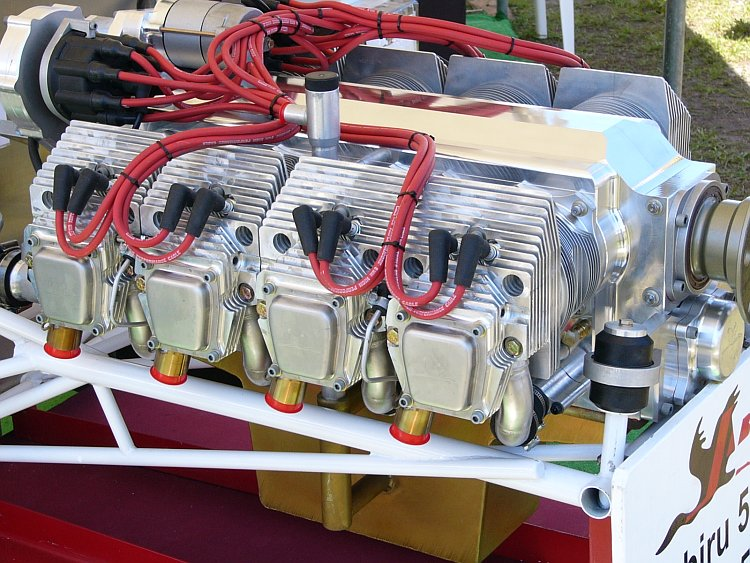
Jabiru 5100 aircraft engine

Several flat-eight aircraft engines have been produced over the years:

- 1948-1961 Lycoming GSO-580 Air-cooled, 9.47 L (578 cu in)
- 1961–present Lycoming IO-720. Air-cooled, 11.8 L (722 cu in)
- 1969-1975 Continental Tiara 8-380 (O-540) and T8-450 (O-540). Air-cooled, 8.9 L (541 cu in)
- 1997-200? Jabiru 5100. Air-cooled, 5.1 L (310 cu in)
- 2013-???? Engineered Propulsion Systems Vision 350. Turbo-diesel, water-cooled, 4.4 L (269 cu in)

== Use in marine vessels ==
Flat-eight engines are seldom used in marine applications, with the 1957 Fageol VIP 88 outboard engine being a rare example of a production engine. The VIP 88 consisted of two 0.7 L (44 cu in) Crosley engine blocks joined on a common crankshaft.

Another marine engine was the one-off Miller 148 marine engine which was built in 1928 and used in the racing boat Miss Rioco III. The Miller 148 had dual overhead camshafts and a displacement of 2.4 L (148 cu in).

== See also ==
- Straight-eight engine
- V8 engine
- W8 engine
