= Werner Pokorny =

German sculptor (1949–2022)

Werner Pokorny (1949–2022) was a German sculptor.

== Biography ==
Werner Pokorny was born in Mosbach, Germany in 1949. He studied at the State Academy of Fine Arts Karlsruhe from 1971 to 1976 and subsequently worked as an art teacher and freelance sculptor. In 1988, he served as a guest artist at the Villa Romana in Florence and received a scholarship from the Baden-Württemberg Art Foundation in 1989. From 1989 to 1990, he held a visiting professorship at the Karlsruhe Art Academy and later became a professor at the ABK Stuttgart, a position he held until his retirement in 2013.

Pokorny was a member of several art associations, including the German Artists' Association and the Artists' Association of Baden-Württemberg, of which he served as chairman, as well as the Wilhelmshöhe Art Association in Ettlingen. His contributions to the arts were acknowledged with the Hans Thoma Prize in 2013 and the Order of Merit of Baden-Württemberg in 2017.
