= Helmut Eberspächer =

German businessman

- Born: 18 November 1915; Tübingen
- Died: 19 June 2011 (aged 95); Esslingen am Neckar
- Occupation: Chairman of Eberspächer GmbH
- Military career
- Allegiance: Nazi Germany
- Branch: Heer; Luftwaffe
- Service years: 1934–39; 1939–45
- Rank: Hauptmann (Captain)
- Units: LG 2 SKG 10; KG 51; NSGr. 20
- Conflicts: World War II: Defense of the Reich
- Awards: Knight's Cross of the Iron Cross; Order of Merit of Baden-Württemberg

Helmut Eberspächer (18 November 1915 – 19 June 2011) was a German businessman and chairman of Eberspächer. During World War II, he served in the Wehrmacht as a fighter pilot. A flying ace, he was awarded the Knight's Cross of the Iron Cross, the highest award in the military and paramilitary forces of Nazi Germany during World War II. He was credited with 7 victories, each resulting in the destruction of an enemy aircraft.

In 1950, he and his cousin Walter took over the family business, Eberspächer GmbH. He ran the business as chairman until 1988, and remained as an honorary chairman until 2005. He also served on the board of the Confederation of German Employers' Associations (BDA) and the German Automotive Industry Association. Under his leadership, Eberspächer became one of the leading automobile industry suppliers in Germany, with approximately 5,600 employees worldwide and 1.9 billion Euros in sales in 2010.

== Military career ==
Eberspächer was born on 18 November 1915 in Tübingen, at that time part of the Kingdom of Württemberg, a federated state of the German Empire. In 1934 he volunteered for military service in the Reichswehr, and served in an armoured reconnaissance battalion. In parallel to his military service he studied mechanical engineering at the University of Stuttgart. Following his graduation in 1939, he transferred to the Luftwaffe. From July 1940 to January 1943 he served with the 7.(Fernaufklärungs-) Staffel of Lehrgeschwader 2 (7th Long Range Reconnaissance Squadron of the 2nd Demonstration Wing) on both Western and Eastern Fronts. (Note: For an explanation of Luftwaffe unit designations see Organisation of the Luftwaffe during World War II.) He then converted to a ground attack role, and from March 1943 served with Schnellkampfgeschwader 10 (SKG 10—10th Fast Bomber Wing), flying fighter-bomber missions over southern England and anti-shipping operations in the English Channel. He was promoted to the rank of Hauptmann (captain) on 1 May 1944 and appointed as Staffelkapitän (leader of the squadron) in Kurt Dahlmann's I./SKG 10 (1st Group).

Early on D-Day 6 June 1944, Eberspächer led four Focke-Wulf Fw 190s of 3./SKG 10 (3rd Squadron of SKG 10) over Normandy. At 05:01 they had intercepted a formation of Royal Air Force Avro Lancasters. Three were claimed as downed by Eberspächer, one of them being Lancaster ND739 of No. 97 Squadron RAF, flown by the squadron's commanding officer, W/C Jimmie Carter. His seven-man crew had earned four Distinguished Flying Crosses and three Distinguished Flying Medals. The wreckage of ND739 was located and excavated in 2012. An assortment of items were recovered including the wedding ring belonging to crew member Albert Chambers.

Eberspächer was awarded the German Cross in Gold (Deutsches Kreuz in Gold) on 23 July 1944 and the Knight's Cross of the Iron Cross (Ritterkreuz des Eisernen Kreuzes) on 24 January 1945, after 170 Jabo (German abbreviation for Jagdbomber—fighter-bomber) missions over the Western Front. He flew sorties during the Battle of the Bulge and against the Remagen bridge and the established US Army bridgehead. His unit, I./SKG 10 (1st Group of SKG 10), was assigned to Kampfgeschwader 51 as III. Gruppe (3rd Group) on 30 June 1944. His squadron was then redesignated as the 3. Staffel/Nachtschlachtgruppe 20 night harassment attack squadron in October 1944. He survived the war and was credited with a total of seven aerial victories, including three at night.

== Later life and business career ==
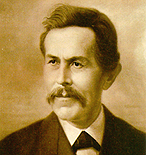
Jakob Eberspächer, grandfather of Helmut and founder of the "Glasdachfabrik-Eberspächer".

After the war, Eberspächer joined the family business, which had been founded by his grandfather, Jakob Eberspächer, in 1965 as a plumber's workshop which was known as "Glasdachfabrik-Eberspächer" (Eberspächer Roof-Glazing). He succeeded Hanns-Martin Schleyer in 1978 as president of the Landesvereinigung Baden-Württembergischer Arbeitgeberverbände (State Federation of Baden-Württemberg Employers' Associations) after Schleyer was kidnapped and murdered by the Red Army Faction on 18 October 1977. Eberspächer also supported the Internationale Bachakademie Stuttgart.

In July 1989, in the aftermath of the Flick affair, Eberspächer was fined 140,000 DM for tax evasion. He had transferred and donated more than 300,000 DM into the accounts of the political parties Christian Democratic Union and Free Democratic Party via the "Gesellschaft zur Förderung der Wirtschaft Baden-Württemberg" (the Society for the Advancement of Economics in Baden-Württemberg) between 1972 and 1981.

He died on 19 June 2011 in Esslingen am Neckar. The Eberspächer family are heirs of his business and are ranked 264th of the 500 richest Germans in 2013, with net assets of 450 Million Euros, an increase of 100 Million Euros over the year 2012.

== Summary of career ==
Mathews and Foreman, authors of Luftwaffe Aces — Biographies and Victory Claims, researched the German Federal Archives and state that Ebersbächer claimed seven aerial victories, including three at night.

Chronicle of aerial victories
This and the ! (exclamation mark) indicates aerial victories listed in Luftwaffe Night Fighter Claims 1939 – 1945 but not in Luftwaffe Aces — Biographies and Victory Claims.
Claim	Date	Time	Type	Location	Serial No./Squadron No.
– III. Gruppe of Kampfgeschwader 51 –
1	6 June 1944	05:01	Lancaster	Isigny	
2	6 June 1944	05:03	Lancaster	Carentan	
2	6 June 1944	05:03	Lancaster	Carentan	

=== Awards ===
- Iron Cross (1939)
  - 2nd Class (5 May 1941)
  - 1st Class (5 August 1941)
- Honour Goblet of the Luftwaffe on 17 April 1944 as Oberleutnant and pilot (Note: According to Obermaier on 20 March 1944.)
- German Cross in Gold on 1 January 1945 as Hauptmann in the I./Schnellkampfgeschwader 10
- Knight's Cross of the Iron Cross on 26 January 1945 as Hauptmann and Staffelkapitän of the 3./Nachtschlacht-Gruppe 20
- Order of Merit of Baden-Württemberg (1979) presented on 21 April 1979 at Ludwigsburg Palace
