= Dorothee Hess-Maier =

German publisher

- Born: Dorothee Margarete Helene Ursula Maier; Bad Waldsee, Tuscany, Württemberg-Hohenzollern, Germany
- Education: Southwest Missouri State University; Ludwig-Maximilians-Universität München
- Occupations: Publisher; Philanthropist
- Spouse: Willhelm Hess
- Children: 2
- Parents: Eugen Maier (1899-1945) (father); Albertine Maier-Dependorf (1900-1992) (mother)

Dorothee Hess-Maier is a semi-retired German publisher. She has served as part of the top management team at the "Otto-Maier-Verlag" (publishing company) and as an executive board member of its associate company, Ravensburger AG. In 1989, she became the first woman after 164 years to accept an appointment as "Vorsteherin" (head) of the Börsenverein des Deutschen Buchhandels (German book trade association).

== Life ==
Dorothee Margarete Helene Ursula Maier was born into a publishing dynasty, slightly less than three years after the Hitler government took power, at Bad Waldsee, a small lakeside town in the hills north of Lake Constance and the frontier with Switzerland. She grew up in the family home at nearby Ravensburg. Her father, Eugen Maier (1899-1945), had held an important position in the family publishing business, but was called away to fight in the war and died in May 1945 as it ended. Her mother, Albertine Maier-Dependorf (1900-1992), was a painter and graphic artist. The family into which she was born was a Protestant one, and as a child she sang both in the local church choir and, a little later, in the Bach Choir of the local Protestant community: half a century later she no longer considers herself particularly religious.

Dorothee Maier completed her secondary schooling at the prestigious Wilhelmsgymnasium (secondary school) in Munich (which had ended up in the American occupation zone after 1945) and moved on to undertake a course at Southwest Missouri State University (as it was known at that time) in Springfield, Missouri during 1956/57. She then returned to Munich where she worked, till 1959, for the advertising agency, "Bußkamp + Koch". During this period she also found time to undertake a training at the Munich Institute for Photo-journalism ("Institut für Bildjournalismus") and to study art history at the Ludwig-Maximilians-Universität München.

Between 1959 Maier undertook and completed a three-year apprenticeship in "Verlagsbuchhändlerin" (book publishing and trading) at the Otto Maier Verlag (publishing business). Reflecting and by some criteria outperforming the benign economic conditions prevailing in West Germany at that time, the business was embarking on a period of expansion under the leadership (since 1953) of her cousin Otto Julius Maier. The firm's founder, Otto Robert Maier (1852–1925), had been their shared grandfather. She then remained with the firm, working variously in the sales, advertising and editing departments.

In 1966, shortly after passing her thirtieth birthday, Hess-Maier was accepted as a partner (loosely, co-owner) of Otto Maier Verlag KG, a company registered, till 1981, as a limited liability privately owned business partnership("Kommanditgesellschaft" / KG). She became the partner responsible for the editing department of the book publishing operation and then, later, of the entire book publishing department and co-managing director (with her cousin) of Otto Maier Verlag KG. During the 1970s she felt duty-bound continued to work full-time while her children were young, despite an acute awareness of a widespread disapproval in West Germany at that time of mothers doing this if their husbands were earning well and their children were young. It helped that she was able to employ a nanny, and the boys also had access to a nearby grandmother. As the children began to become less dependent she teamed up with her cousin, Otto Julius Maier in 1978 to head up jointly the company's Books and Games publishing business. She retained her seat at the company's top table following changes in its legal structure and status: it became a "Gesellschaft mit beschränkter Haftung" (GmbH) in 1981 and an "Aktiengesellschaft" (AG) in 1988. For five years from 1995 Hess-Maier served as "Sprecherin" (loosely, the "public face") of the three person board of directors at the business which by this time had become Ravensburger AG. In 2000 she stood down from the executive board, joining instead the supervisory board ("Aufsichtsrat") of Ravensburger AG. Between 2006 and 2015 she served as deputy chair of the supervisory board. Her place was taken, in 2015, by Alfred Hess, her son

Since 1986 Dorothee Hess-Maier has been a member of the Börsenverein des Deutschen Buchhandels (German book trade association) executive committee. In 1989 she became the first woman be selected to lead the already venerable association, serving as its "Vorsteherin" for the next three years. Later, invited by an interviewer to reflect on her achievements in having apparently broken through some gender-driven glass ceilings during her career, Hess-Maier insisted that she had not been the first woman to reach the top in publishing, and that she was keen to evaluate her career in its entirety, including the many years before she reached the top, having done so, she hoped, not on the basis of family connections but "because I can do the jobs assigned properly, and have something in my head. For my generation, men were still being given more credit than women: I had to show that a woman can do all that stuff too". (Note: "... nicht weil ich zur Familie gehöre, sondern weil ich ordentlich arbeiten kann und etwas im Kopf habe. In meiner Generation wurde immer noch Männern mehr zugetraut als Frauen. Da musste ich zeigen: Eine Frau kann das auch.")

After stepping down from the Ravensburg executive board, in 2000 Hess-Maier accepted an additional role as chair of the not-for-profit "Stiftung Ravensburger Verlag" (loosely, "Ravensburg Foundation"), set up that year by the various companies in the Ravensburg group and their shareholders. The foundation focuses principally, like the publishing business itself, on children, family, education and training. She stepped down from the position in 2016, which was the year of her eightieth birthday.

== Education support ==
Since her semi-retirement in 1999/2000 Hess-Maier has taken on a number of honorary (unpaid) hands-on societal support roles, notably in respect of school-level education. Among these, during the thirteenth legislative period, between 2001 and 2006, she served on the "Bildungsrat Baden-Württemberg" (Education Advisory Council for the state of Baden-Württemberg). Between 2005 and 2009 she sat as a member of the oversight board for the (in 2005 newly established) Stuttgart-based State Institute for Schools Development.

== Personal ==
Dorothee Hess-Maier was married to Dr. Wilhelm Hess, a lawyer who died in 1994. The couple's son Thomas died in 1974 following an accident. Their son, Alfred Hess, became a lawyer, like his father, and has subsequently joined the family firm, like his mother.

== Recognition (selection) ==
- 1997 Friedrich Perthes medal from the Börsenverein des Deutschen Buchhandels
- 1999 Order of Merit of Baden-Württemberg
- 2006 Order of Merit of the Federal Republic of Germany First Class
- 2007 Honour Medal from the town of Ravensburg
- 2014 Honorary Senator at the Pädagogische Hochschule [teacher training college] Weingarten
