= Nina Eisenhardt =

Politician from Germany

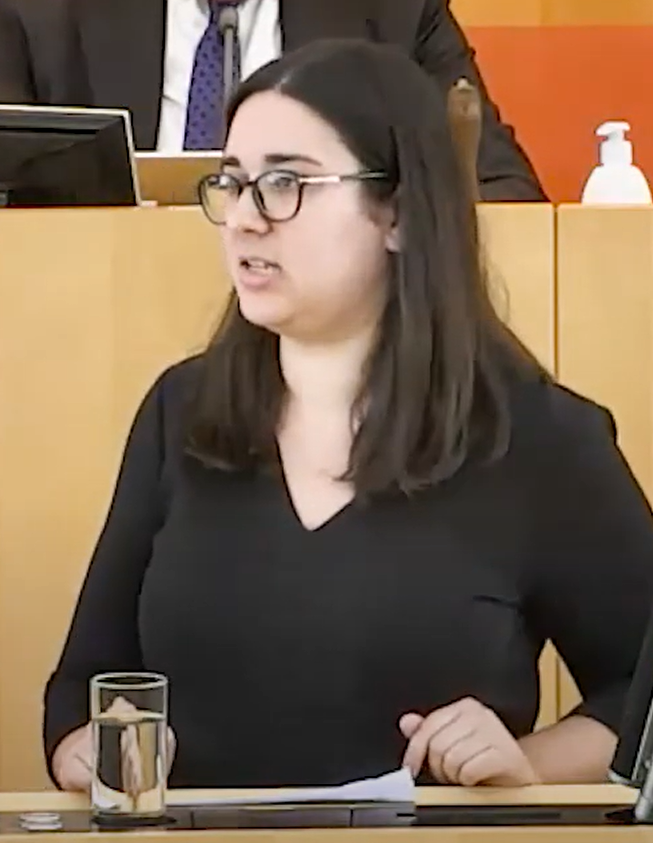
- Eisenhardt in 2020
- Incumbent
- Assumed office January 2019

Member of the Landtag of Hesse

Personal details
- Born: Nina Eisenhardt; 1990 (age 35–36) Sindelfingen, Germany
- Party: Alliance 90/The Greens

Nina Eisenhardt (born 28 May 1990 in Sindelfingen) is a German politician from Alliance 90/The Greens. She has been a member of the Hesse State Parliament since 2019.

== Life ==
Nina Eisenhardt received her Bachelor in Political Science from the Technical University of Darmstadt in 2014 and studied International Studies: Peace and Conflict Studies as a Master at the Goethe University Frankfurt from 2014 to 2017. she was the state director of the Green Youth of Hesse from 2015 to 2018.

Eisenhardt was a member of the city council in Renningen for her party from 2009 to 2010. In the 2017 German federal election, she ran as a candidate in the Groß-Gerau electoral district. In the 2018 Hessian state election she also ran as a candidate in the Groß-Gerau II electoral district, and was elected to the Hesse state parliament via the Green Party's state list. In the state parliament, she is a member of the Committee for Digital Affairs and Data Protection and the Committee for Science and the Arts.
