= Renningen =

- Town
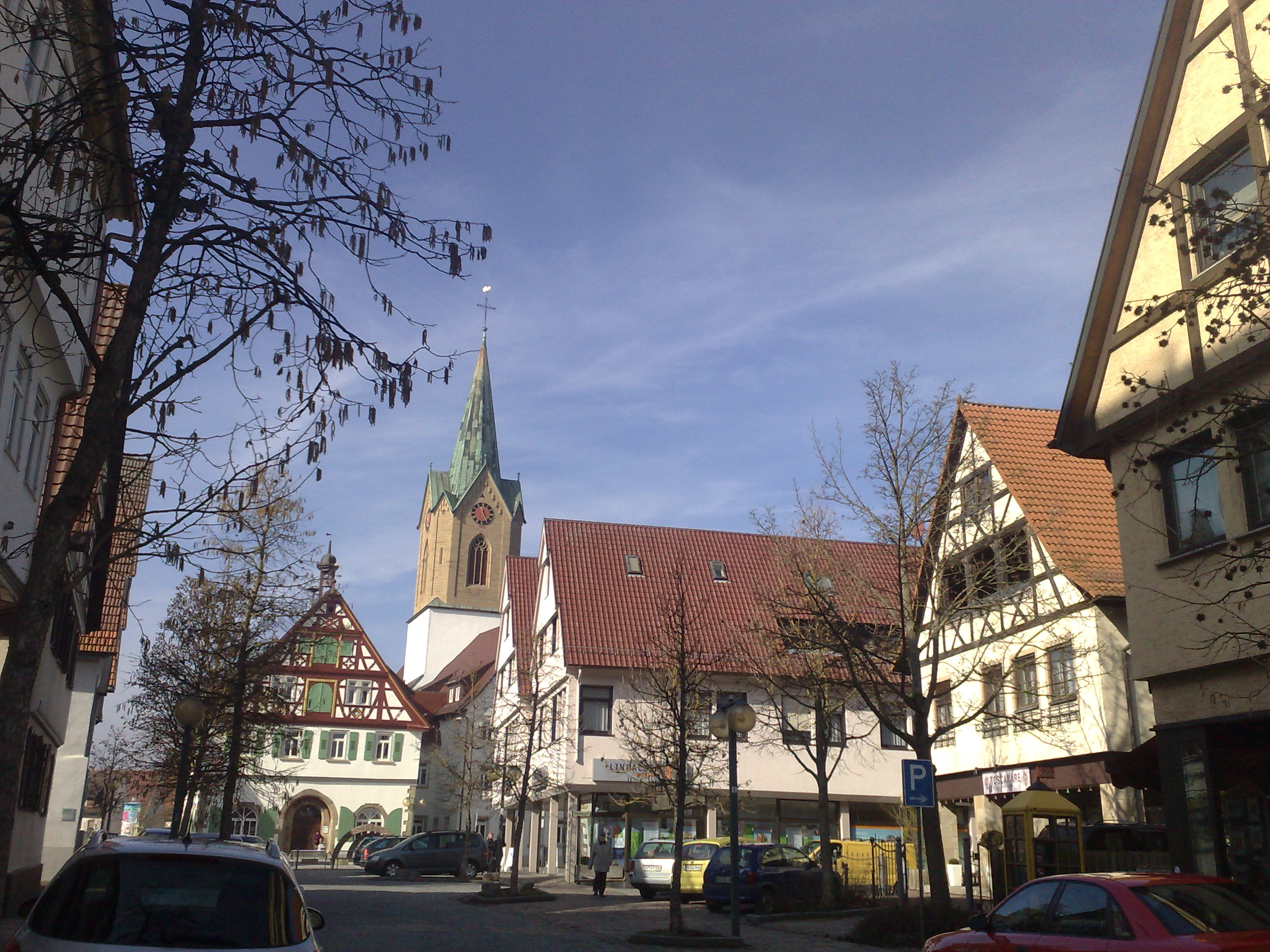
- Town centre

- Coat of arms

- Location of Renningen within Böblingen district
- Interactive map of Renningen
- Location within Germany Location within Baden-Württemberg
- Coordinates: 48°45′58″N 8°56′5″E
- Country: Germany
- State: Baden-Württemberg
- Admin. region: Stuttgart
- District: Böblingen
- Subdivisions: 2

Government
  - Mayor (2024–32): Melanie Hettmer

Area
  - Total: 31.15 km^{2} (12.03 sq mi)
- Elevation: 409 m (1,342 ft)

Population (2025-12-31)
  - Total: 18,728
  - Density: 601.2/km^{2} (1,557/sq mi)
- Time zone: UTC+01:00 (CET)
  - Summer (DST): UTC+02:00 (CEST)
- Postal codes: 71264–71272
- Dialling codes: 07159
- Vehicle registration: BB, LEO
- Website: www.renningen.de

Renningen (German pronunciation: [ˈʁɛnɪŋən]) is a town in the district of Böblingen, Baden-Württemberg, Germany. It is situated 18 km west of Stuttgart.

== Geography ==
Renningen is located in the west of Stuttgart, between Leonberg and Weil der Stadt on the fringes of the fertile plains of the Neckarland. The Rankbach valley extends here to the Renningen Basin.

=== Neighbouring municipalities ===
Magstadt, Weil der Stadt, Leonberg, Rutesheim, Heimsheim

== History ==
Renningen lies in an area which even in the Early Stone Age was thickly populated. Proof of this are the many remains found of settlements from the linear pottery culture. Remains of settlements found to originate with the Urnenfelderkultur (c. 1000 BC) as well the Hallstatt- and La Tène culture (Early to Late Iron Age), provide evidence of settlement during various prehistoric eras.

The evaluation of archeological digs and finds show expansion of two early Alemannic settlements within the Renningen Basin north and south of the Rankbach. Excavations by the then State Office for Historical Monuments in Baden-Württemberg in the Raite Industrial Park (1991) unearthed a number of farmsteads comprising three-naved longhouses, storehouses and pit houses (4th and 5th century).

A second settlement in the Neuwiesenäckern developed into a large settlement, which can now be identified as Altheim, first mentioned in the 12th century. During the Middle Ages, numerous other areas of settlement sprang up alongside this settlement. In the 12th and 13th century the population began to gravitate towards the two present-day centres of the town, since around 1200 the expansion of the outlying areas of the town seems to have stopped. Several earlier finds in the centre of Renningen show, that an older core settlement exists on the site of the later village. A few finds belong to the late Merovingian period or the Carolingian period, but most of the finds date to the 11th or 12th century and are contemporary with the settlements on the Neuwiesenäckern. It is however uncertain if the site had been occupied during the centuries between. Near the church there is a graveyard from the early Merovingian era excavated in 1989/90 by the State Office for Historical Monuments, which was abandoned c. 500 though it is questionable as to whether it served an actual settlement, since the only evidence for this is a single fragment of pottery found in the vicinity. Later burial sites have been found on only the south side of Malmsheim, on the site of a suspected early Merovingian graveyard.

Written tradition says that Renningen was subject to the Villikation system of the Weißenburg monastery during the Carolingian period. 22 1/2 farmsteads are mentioned, whereby the historical observations on the fate of this property raise the question as to whether these farmsteads were located within the later boundaries of the town. In the 11th and 12th centuries there was a nobility, which owned property in both towns, according to written records. In Malmsheim and the abandoned Altheim, Staufian style properties have been found. By the 14th century the community was organised to some extent, with the existence of a Schultheiß (Early form of Mayor) as well as a collective three-field system.

At the dawn of the modern era, Renningen was a large village, characterised by its craftsmen, its town boundaries marked by a wall, which exists to this day.

In 1982 Renningen was granted town rights. New development has expanded the former village well to the north.

=== Religion ===
Since the Reformation Renningen has been predominantly Evangelical. Only in recent time has a Roman Catholic community emerged once more. Alongside these, there is a New Apostolic community and the Liebenzeller Gemeinschaft.

=== Areas of town ===
==== Malmsheim ====
Malmsheim was first mentioned in documents from 1075 as the property of the Weissenberg monastery under the name of Mahalbodesheim. During the municipal re-organisation of 1972, the town lost its independence and was incorporated into Renningen. By absorbing the new development area of Schnallenäcker (from 1996), Malmsheim had 6054 inhabitants as of 31 December 2004.

== Population development ==
- 1871: 2.849
- 1925: 3.389
- 1950: 6.311
- 1985: 13.268
- 2000: 17.142
- 2015: 17.107

== International relations ==
Renningen is twinned with:

- Mennecy (France), since 1982
- Saalburg-Ebersdorf (Thuringia)
- Occhiobello (Rovigo )(Veneto) (Italia)

== Economy and Infrastructure ==
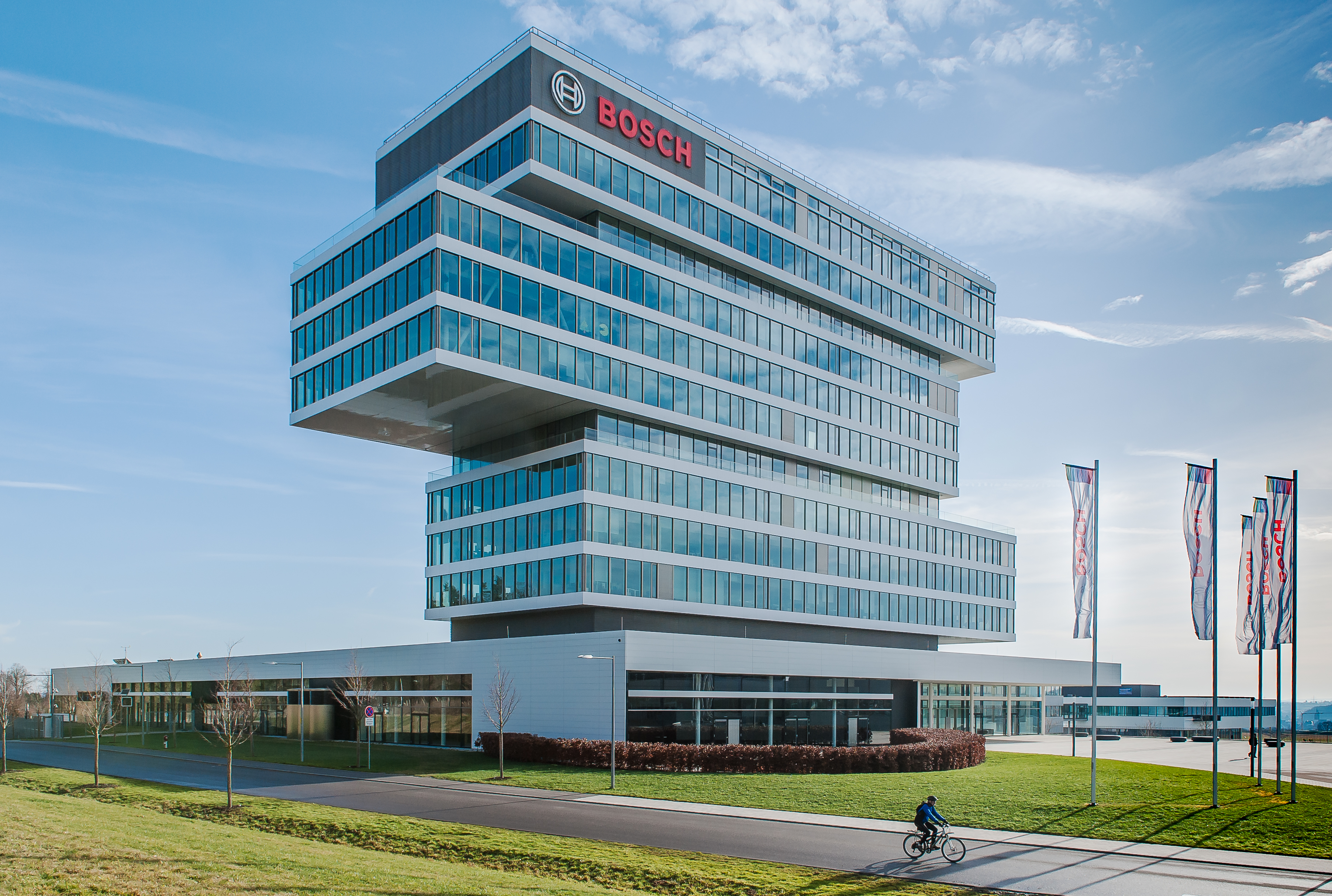
Robert Bosch research center

Renningen is economically dependent on the wider community, a large percentage of the workforce work outside the district, for example at DaimlerChrysler in Sindelfingen or in Stuttgart. Nevertheless, there are employment opportunities, for example through Pininfarina, who are involved in Formula 1 and in manufacture of sports cars. Kromberg & Schubert, the major cable harness supplier to the German car industry also have a presence in the town.

The DaimlerChrysler subsidiary MCC Smart previously had their main office in Renningen, as did Rinol AG, a manufacturer of floor coverings for industrial use, before their insolvency.

Eberspächer subsidiary, Eberspächer SÜTRAK GmbH & Co. KG, former subsidiary of the American air conditioning group Carrier, has its head office in Renningen

Huron Frassmachinen Gmbh, the German subsidiary of Huron Graffenstaden SAS, Feance, has opened Technology Zentrum and their German Headquarters here. Huron is world-renowned CNC machine tool builder manufacturing 3 axes and 5 axes CNC machining centers and also offers CNC turning and milling machines.

Since 2015 Robert Bosch GmbH has a research campus in Renningen which is used as the hub of Bosch’s global research and development network. In 2016 around 1700 researchers and engineers worked on the campus.

=== Transport ===
Malmsheim Airfield is a military airfield with an adjacent glider airfield. The nearest major airport is Stuttgart Airport.

The Black Forest Railway (Stuttgart - Weil der Stadt) is currently used as Line S6 of the S-Bahn Stuttgart and has stops in Renningen and Malmsheim. For 2010, it is planned that the Rankbachbahn (via Magstadt and Sindelfingen to Böblingen) will be re-commissioned as Line S60. The line is currently used for freight traffic.

Renningen is connected to the national road network via the Bundesstraße B 295 (Stuttgart - Calw). The B464 Sindelfingen–Renningen is currently under construction, this will link up with the B295 at Renningen.

=== Education ===
Renningen has a gymnasium and a realschule. With the Friedrich-Schiller-Schule in the main town and the Friedrich-Silcher-Schule in Malmsheim there are, in addition, two Grundschulen and Hauptschulen.

== Culture and places of interest ==
=== Theatre ===
- http://www.naturtheater-renningen.de Naturtheater Renningen

Against the natural backdrop of a former quarry, "Am Längenbühl", stands the vast open-air stage of the Naturtheater. It is a "true open-air theatre", which has neither a stage roof, nor spectator seating. For adults, yarns and comedies are performed in Swabian dialect. Since 1984 classical children's fairy tales like "Rapunzel", "Tischlein deck Dich", "Aladdin and the Magic Lamp" or "Puss in Boots" have been rehearsed here. The English language theater group, Outcast International Theater has also performed "Robin Hood" in 1999, 2000 and 2002.

=== Museums ===
- Archaeological Museum (in the School buildings)
- Local museum (Malmsheim)

=== Building ===
- Town walls

== Literature ==
- S. Arnold/U. Gross/I. Stork, ... mehr als 1 Jahrtausend... Leben im Renninger Becken vom 4. bis 12. Jahrhundert. Archäologische Informationen Baden-Württemberg Heft 19, Stuttgart 1991.
- R. Schreg, Ländliche Siedlungen in Schwaben. - Strukturwandel zum Jahr 1000?, in: B. Scholkmann/S. Lorenz (Hrsg.), Schwaben vor 1000 Jahren, Filderstadt 2002, Seiten 216-238.
- I. Stork, Vor- und Frühgeschichte im Renninger Becken, in: I. Stork/H.-M. Maurer/V. Trugenberger/R. Müller/F. Kühbauch/ H. Müller/B. Maier, Renningen und Malmsheim. Eine Stadt und ihre Geschichte, Stuttgart 1991, Seiten 10-31.

== Associated with Renningen ==
- Rainer Widmayer (born 1967), footballer and coach, played in his youth at the SpVgg Renningen.
- Nina Eisenhardt (born 1990), politician.
