= Malmsheim Airfield =

Malmsheim Airfield Flugplatz Malmsheim
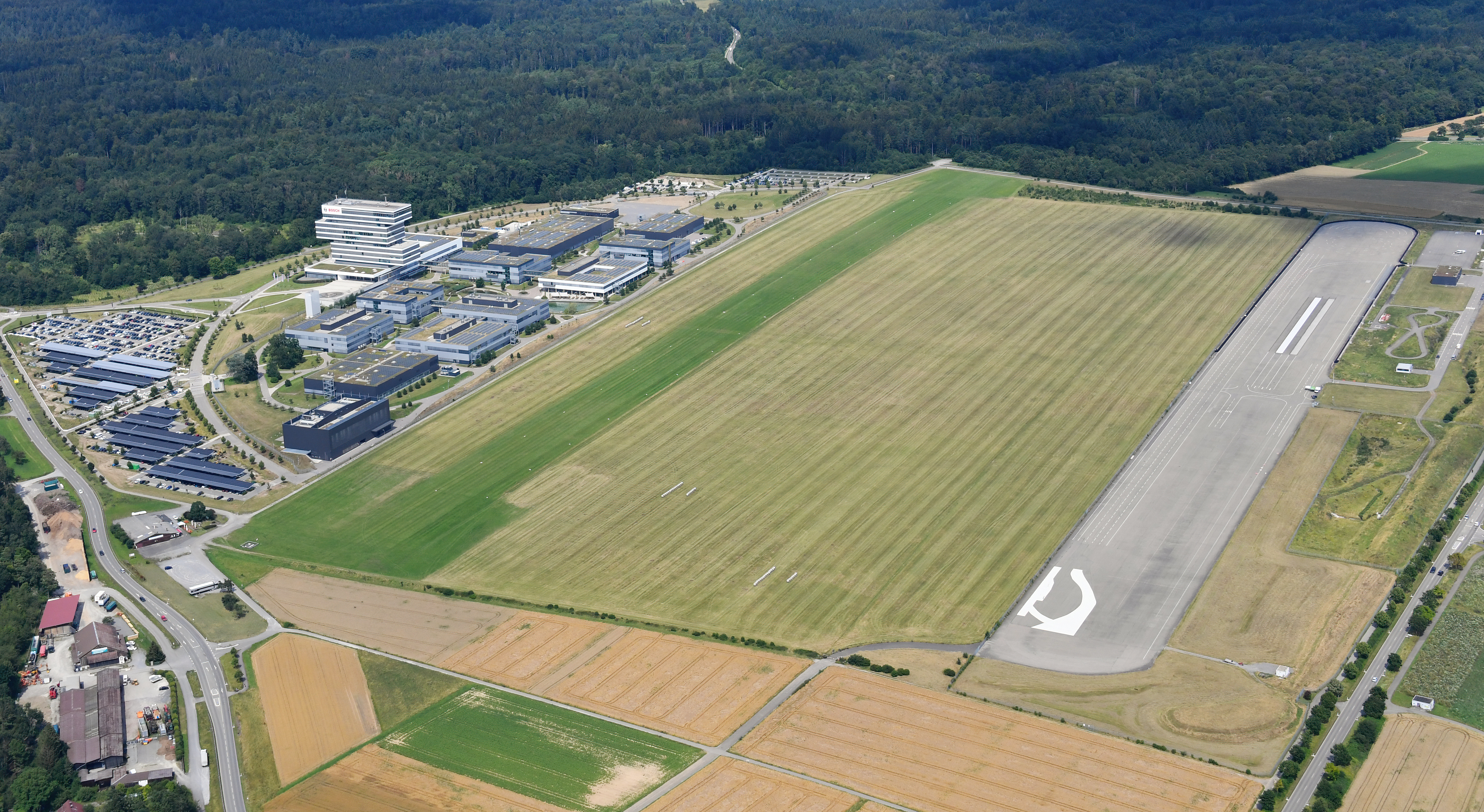
- IATA: none; ICAO: none

Summary
- Airport type: military/private
- Location: Renningen, Germany
- Built: 1937
- Elevation AMSL: 1,500 ft (460 m)
- Coordinates: 48°47′1″N 8°55′10″E
- Interactive map of Malmsheim Airfield

Runways
Direction	Length		Surface
Direction	ft	m	Surface
	2,600	800	Concrete
08/26		1,035	Grass

Malmsheim Airfield is located in the southern German state of Baden-Württemberg, north-east of the city of Renningen's borough of Malmsheim. It consists of an air force base with a reserve concrete runway and a glider airfield.

== History ==
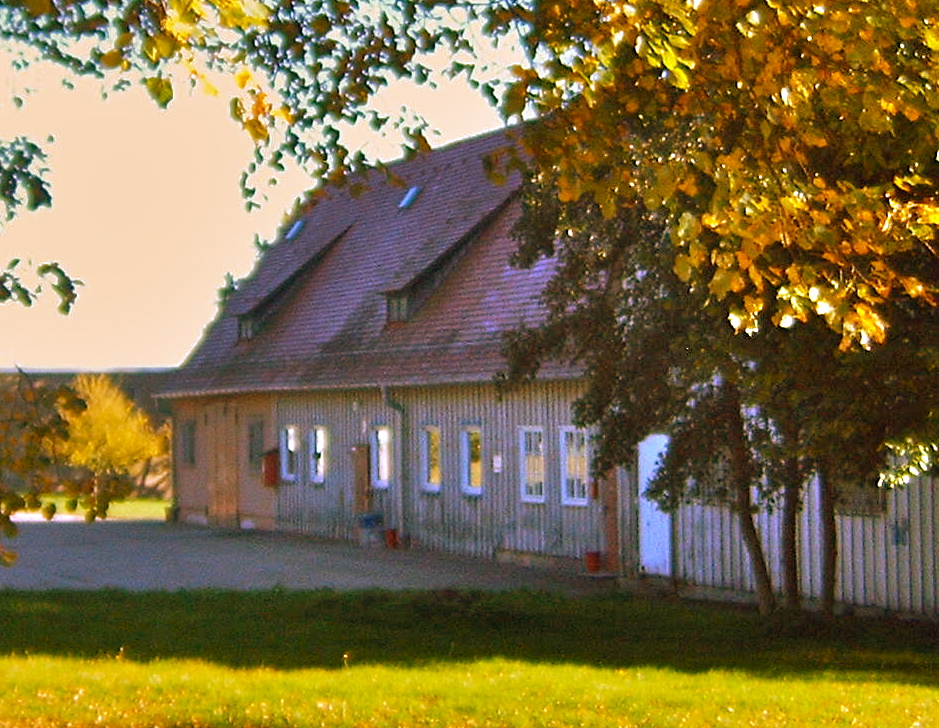
A mock-up "farm building"

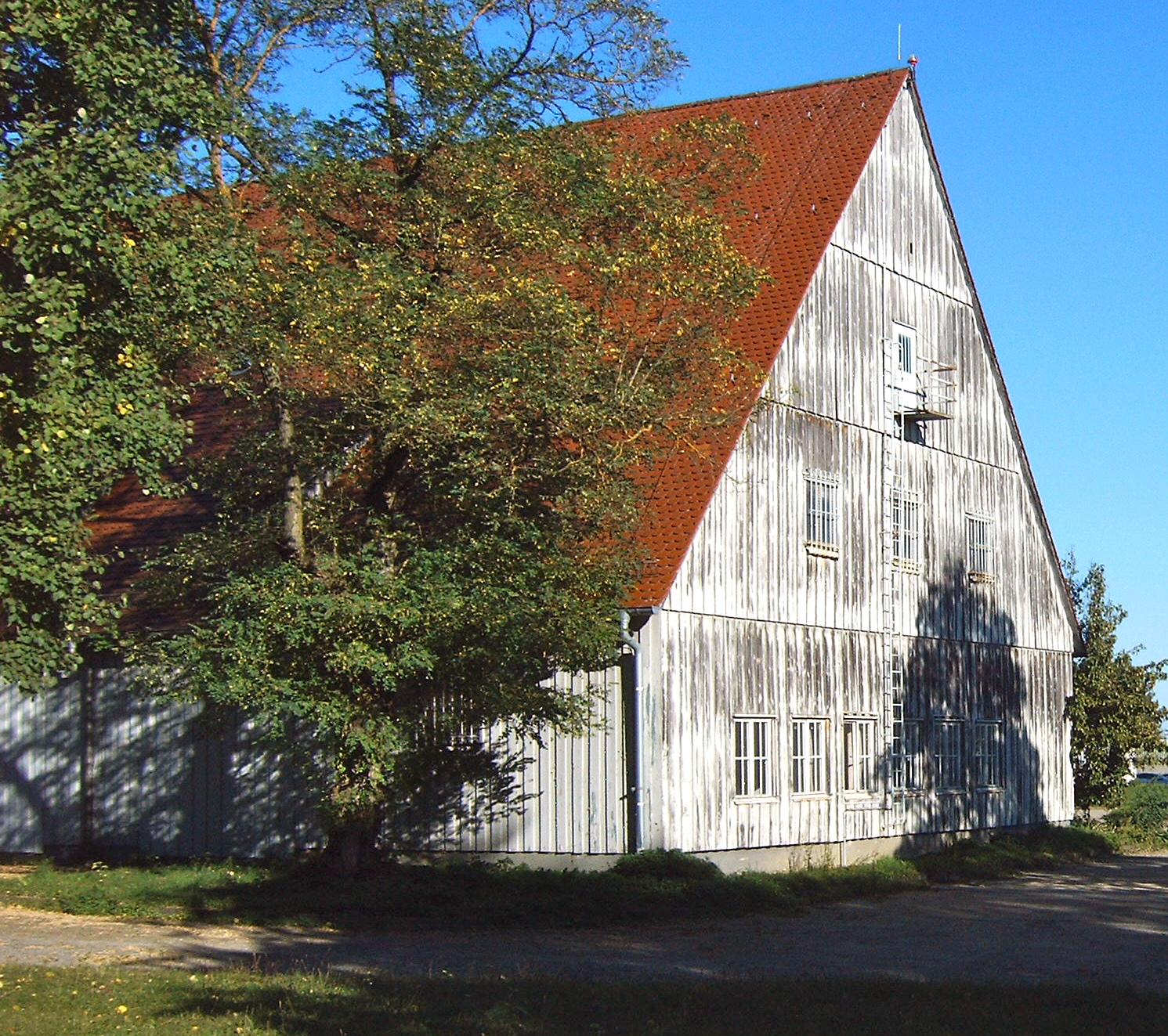
A mock-up "farm building"

On 13 November 1936, the Luftwaffe announced its intention to build what it purported an emergency landing site. The runways were built, mostly at night, by 1937. Buildings were camouflaged as a farm, the site was connected by a standard gauge railway to the Black Forest Railway's Renningen station.

=== World War II ===
During the Battle of France in 1940, Malmsheim was home base to Messerschmitt Bf 110 and Junkers Ju 88 aircraft. With the beginning of the Russian campaign in 1941, the Luftwaffe halted operations on the airfield and the site was converted into a Prisoner of war camp with POWs working on local farms. In 1944 and 1945, the site was used for military aviation once more, being home to the second group of the 53rd fighter squadron.

=== Post-war ===
After the war, it was used briefly by US forces, then from 31 January 1946, ethnic German refugees (Heimatvertriebene) were accommodated. Initially, 1,500 people were brought to the site, via the railway link. The refugee camp's designed capacity was 11,000 people. Most of the refugees housed came from the Sudetenland. In 1949, the camp was assigned a new function as a transit station for returning German POWs. It was also used briefly to house displaced persons.

US forces again used the site from 1951. The Bundeswehr, the post-war West German armed forces, took over the site on its foundation in 1955. A planned deployment of German Army Aviation was not realized, nor was the proposed construction of a civilian airport.

Since about the end of the 1950s, civilian gliders have been leasing a part of the site.

In 1994, the automotive component manufacturer Bosch unveiled the electronic stability control (ESC) system on Malmsheim Airfield.

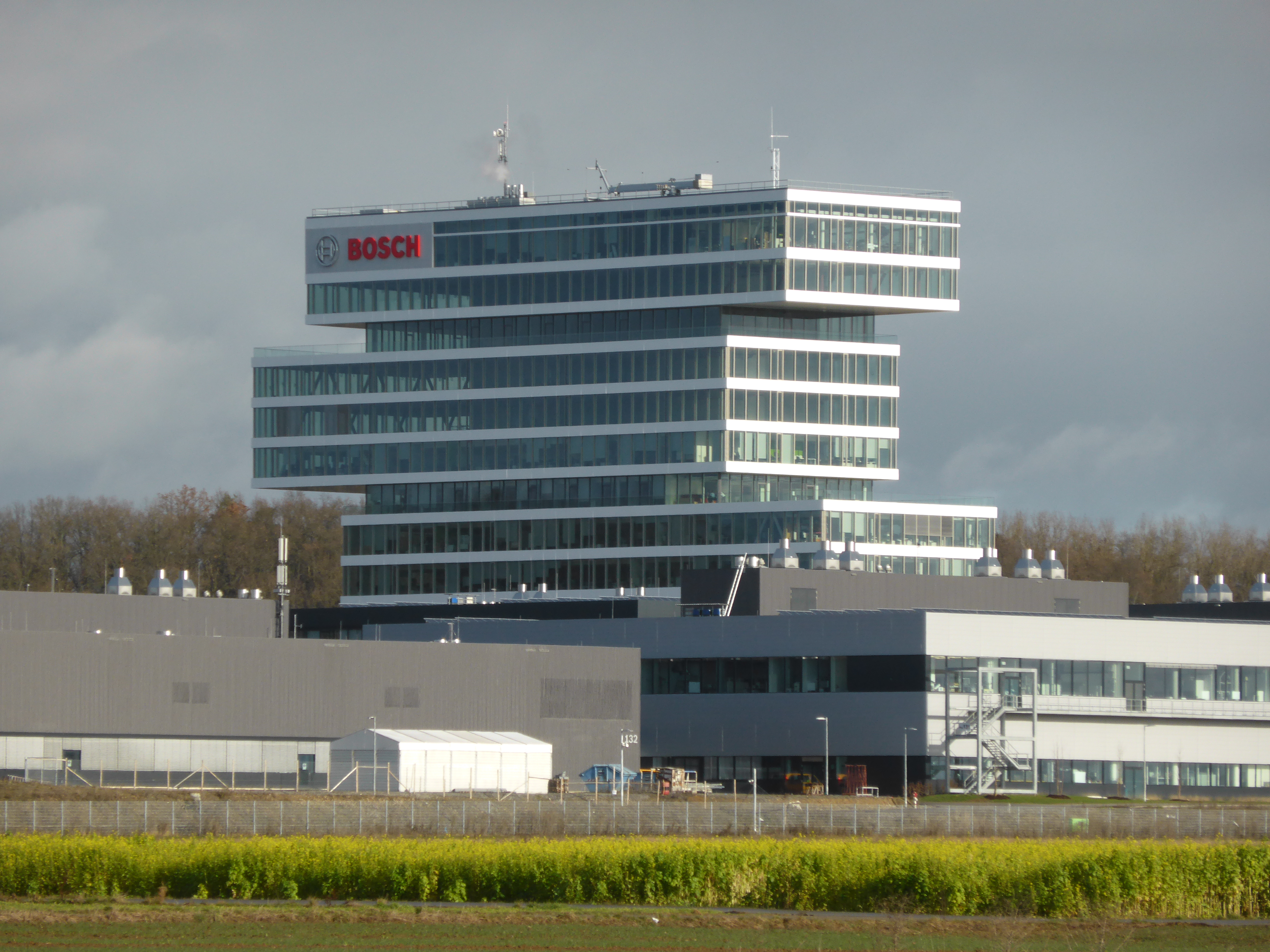
Bosch development center at the airfield

Bosch acquired a part of the site by 2010 in order to erect a "center for research and pre-development". An agreement containing these items had been signed on 3 September 2009. The complete area has a size of 94 hectares, of which Bosch was assigned to acquire 31 hectares on the north and 9 hectares on the south. Demolition work of the airfield buildings began in February 2011. Bosch plans to invest 160 million euros, the center is planned to become operative in 2013 with about 1200 employees. The state of Baden-Württemberg has acquired the central section, Bundeswehr and US forces are allowed to continue to use it until 2029. Usage by gliders for at least ten years has been agreed upon.

== Equipment and use ==
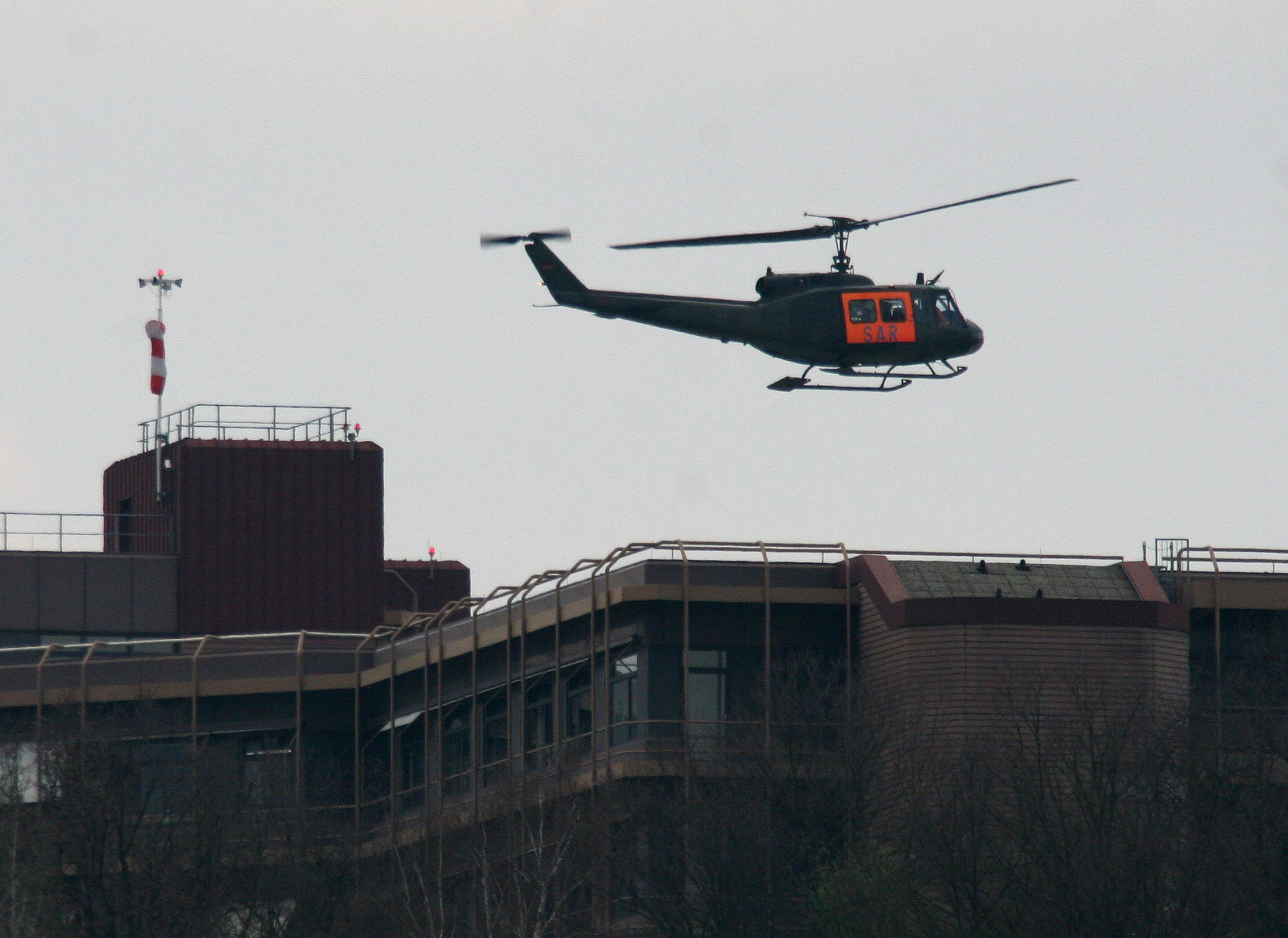
The Malmsheim SAR helicopter takes off from the University of Tübingen's teaching hospital on a mission

The northern section of the site is fenced. A Bell UH-1D (SAR command 46) of the Luftwaffe's search and rescue service has been deployed there ready for operations since 1998. In contrast to many civilian rescue helicopters, this aircraft is fitted with infrared equipment and has a rescue winch. Its service area covers Baden-Württemberg and parts of Bavaria, Hesse, Rhineland-Palatinate and Saarland, which are to be reached within 45 minutes.

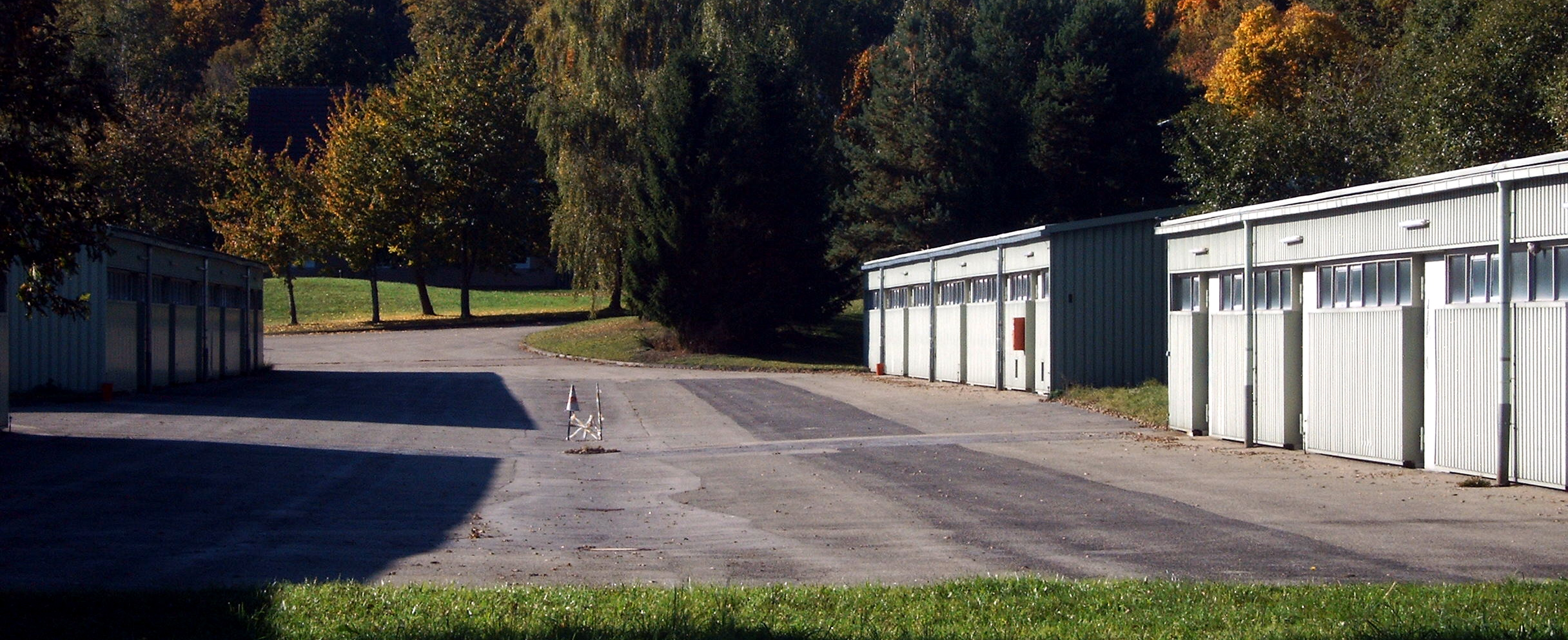
Sheds (2010)

Parachute training

Other buildings in the northern section were used by the army for storing equipment for the event of mobilization until about 2009. The Kommando Spezialkräfte special forces stationed in nearby Calw, and the US Special Operations Command Europe stationed at Patch Barracks in Stuttgart-Vaihingen, use the area for parachute training.

The runway, which is approximately 800 metres (2,600 ft) long, is a concrete reserve runway the Bundeswehr leaves to car manufacturers for vehicle testing.

The civilian gliding center is operated by Sportfliegerclub Leonberg (”Leonberg sports flying club“). There are two roughly 1,000 metres (3,300 ft) long grass runways lying side by side and used by different clubs. Winch-launching is the launch method in use. The runway direction is 08/26 (roughly east–west).

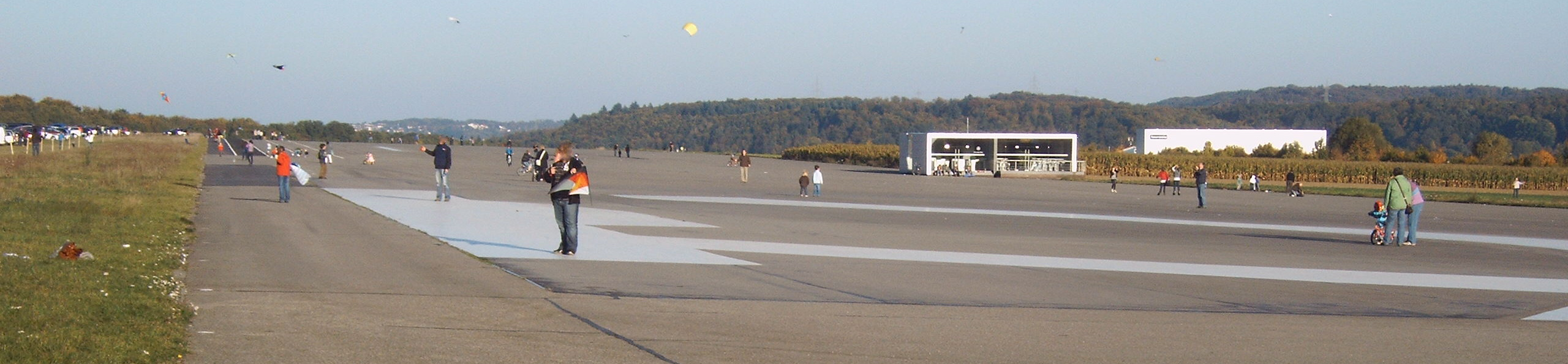
Kite festival on the concrete runway

A kite festival in early October with an international competition on the gliding center's grounds has taken place annually since 2002.

The rail link is inoperative and partly built over by a 1990-constructed bypass road. The connecting switch at Renningen station is dismantled.
