= Order of Merit of Baden-Württemberg =

Award of Baden-Württemberg, Germany

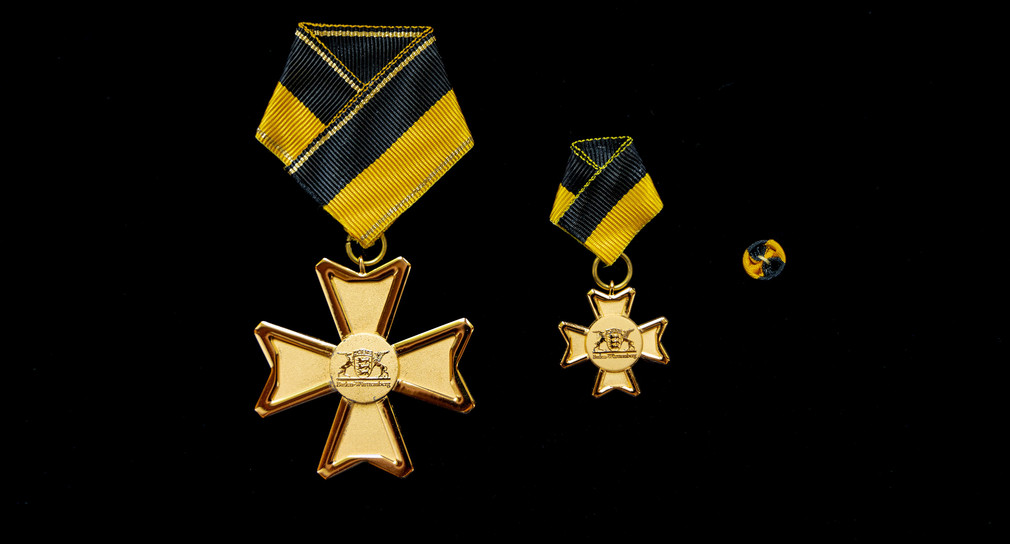
- Order of Merit in its current form since 2016
- Type: Civil order of merit
- Awarded for: Outstanding contributions to the state of Baden-Württemberg, in politics, society, culture and economics
- Country: Germany
- Presented by: Baden-Württemberg
- Formerly called: Medal of Merit of Baden-Württemberg
- Established: 26 November 1974
- First award: 26 April 1975

Highlights
- Total: 1,923 (as of April 2018)
- Website: https://stm.baden-wuerttemberg.de/de/themen/orden-und-ehrenzeichen/verdienstorden-des-landes/
- Ribbon bar of the order

Order of Merit of Baden-Württemberg (German: Verdienstorden des Landes Baden-Württemberg) is the highest award of the German State of Baden-Württemberg. Established 26 November 1974, it was originally called the Medal of Merit of Baden-Württemberg (Die Verdienstmedaille des Landes Baden-Württemberg). Effective 26 June 2009, the medal assumed its current name.

The order is awarded by the Minister-President of Baden-Württemberg for outstanding contributions to the state of Baden-Württemberg, in politics, society, culture and economics. The order is limited to 1,000 living holders, and has been awarded 1,923 times, as of 30 April 2018.

== History ==
The form of the Order of Merit was fundamentally changed by an amendment to the foundation announcement on 3 February 2016. Since then, the Order of Merit is no longer awarded as a medal, but in the form of a stylised cross with a medallion in the middle, on which the large state coat of arms with the lettering „Baden-Württemberg“ is depicted.

== Notable recipients ==
- Helmut Eberspächer (1979)
- Artur Fischer (1980)
- Ulf Merbold (1983)
- Walter Haeussermann (1985)
- Anne-Sophie Mutter (1999)
- Dorothee Hess-Maier (1999)
- Jürgen Klinsmann (2001)
- Gerhard Thiele (2001)
- Klaus Zehelein (2001)
- Wolfgang Ketterle (2002)
- Svetlana Geier (2003)
- Wolfgang Rihm (2004)
- Queen Silvia of Sweden (2007)
- Roland Emmerich (2007)
- Henry Kissinger (2007)
- Stelian Moculescu (2008)
- Edmund Stoiber (2009)
- Hanna von Hoerner (2009)
- Eric Carle (2010)
- Jean-Claude Juncker (2010)
- Sami Khedira (2016)
- Lucia A. Reisch (2017)
