= Eberspächer =

German automotive company

Eberspächer Group
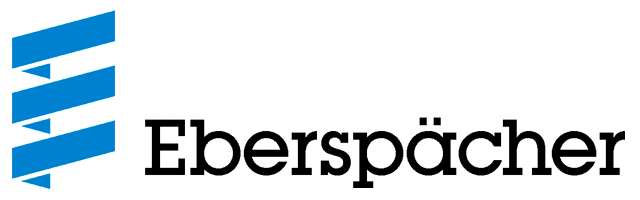
- Type: GmbH & Co.KG
- Industry: Automotive Industry
- Founded: 1865
- Headquarters: Esslingen am Neckar, Germany
- Key people: Martin Peters (Managing Partner); Jörg Steins (Chief Executive Officer, CEO); Uwe Johnen (Chief Transformation Officer CTO); Stephan Knuppertz (Chief Financial Officer CFO)
- Revenue: €2.5 billion (net revenue 2025) €5.0 billion (consolidated revenue)
- Number of employees: 10,374 (2025)
- Website: www.eberspaecher.com

The Eberspächer Group of Companies is a privately owned international automotive supplier, headquartered in Esslingen am Neckar, Germany. Customers include almost all major manufacturers of passenger cars and commercial vehicles. It is one of the leading system developers and suppliers of exhaust technology, vehicle heaters and air-conditioning systems worldwide and is also involved in automotive electronics for electronic networking in the vehicles.

== History ==
Master Tinsmith Jakob Eberspächer founded the company in 1865, which soon specialised in metal-framed roof glazing. In 1914, the factory started operating on the site of its present-day plant in Esslingen. 1931 saw the start of muffler production, and 1933 the development of vehicle heating systems. During the post-war emergency, Eberspächer produced products such as prostheses, metal cases and small cookers.

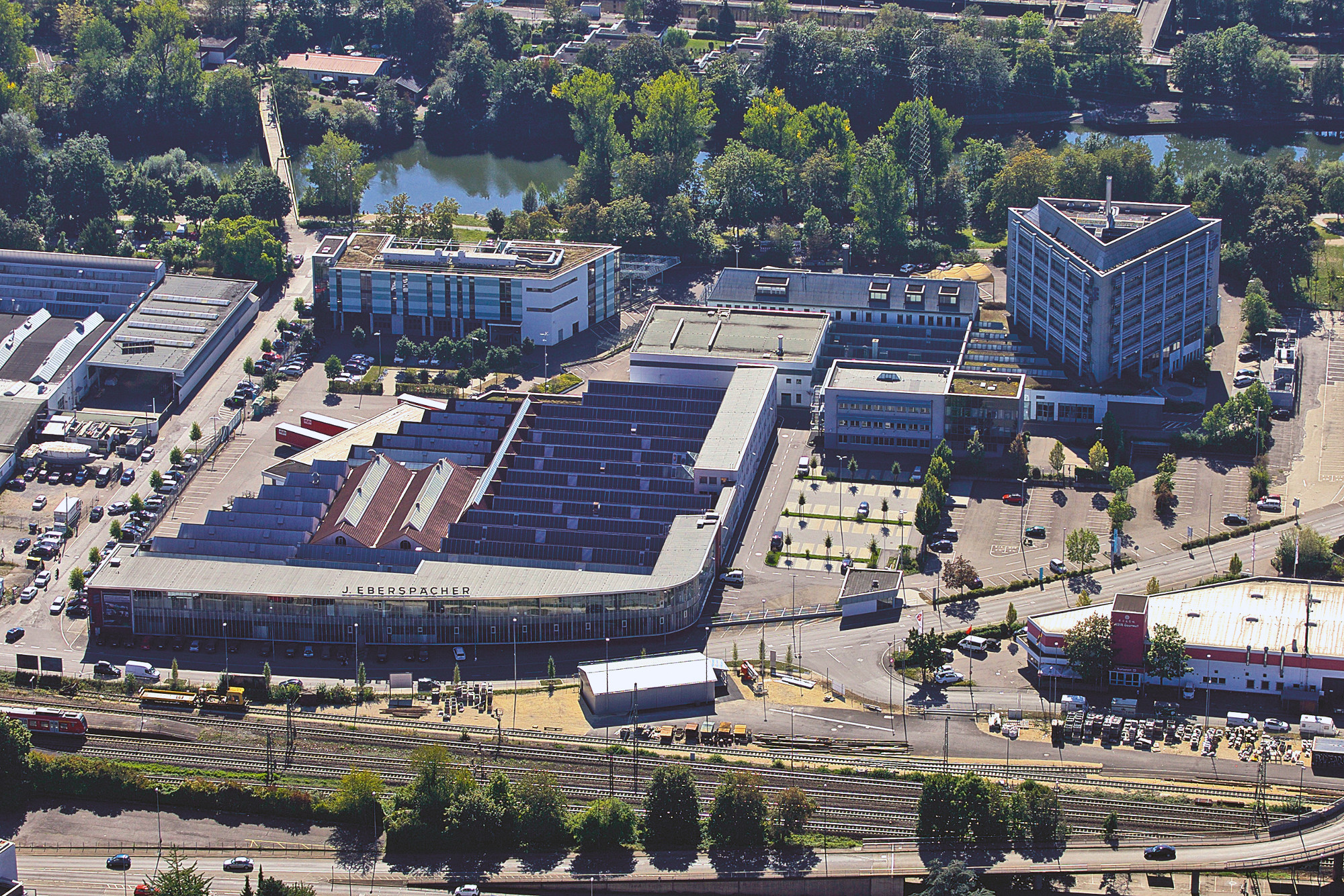
Aerial View Eberspächer Headquarters Esslingen

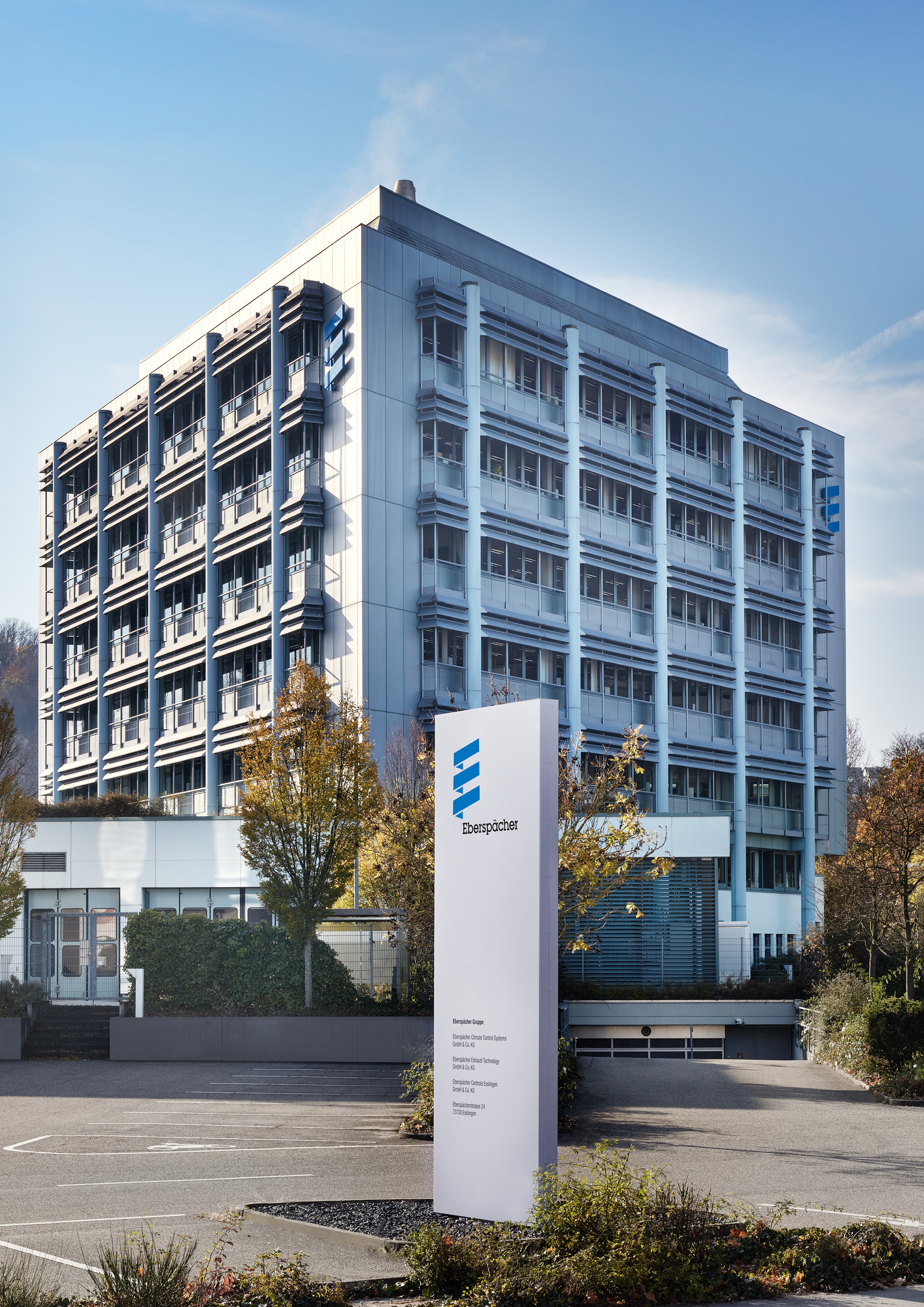
Eberspächer Research and Development Center at Headquarters Esslingen

Pre-heaters for the VW Beetle went into mass production in 1953. In 1960, Eberspächer took over the Neunkirchen metal works in the Saarland and set up a silencer production facility there.

Development of diesel particulate filters for passenger cars began in 1978. In the 1980s, the company invested intensively in internationalisation: production facilities were established in France, Sweden and Switzerland. During the 1990s, Eberspächer established further subsidiaries in South Africa, Czech Republic, the US, Brazil, England and Poland.

The electrical auxiliary heaters of the catem subsidiary went into series production in 1999.

In the 2000s, the Research and Development Center in Detroit as well as the North America catalytic converter plant came on stream. In 2008, the business debuted its electronic networking products for its use with vehicle bus systems. In August 2014, Eberspächer transferred its wholly owned subsidiary Eberspächer Electronics GmbH & Co. KG, based in Göppingen, to STAR COOPERATION Group, based in Böblingen.

In 2010, the company acquired Sütrak and entered the bus and coach air-conditioning market. In the same year, it took over the Prototechnik division of Ricardo Deutschland GmbH, a firm specialising in lightweight design of exhaust systems.

In June 2013, Eberspächer opened a new Asia headquarters and production site in Shanghai/China.

In 2015, the European Commission fined the Eberspächer Group 68 million euros for price fixing of vehicle heating systems.

In September 2016, the Eberspächer Group acquired a majority stake in the Canadian company Vecture Inc. Eberspaecher Vecture Inc. offers battery management products for industrial applications, medical technology and vehicles.

In 2018 Eberspaecher expanded its expertise as a vendor of thermal management systems. The automotive supplier acquired 100 percent of the shares in French company Kalori SAS. The climate control specialist based in Lyon, France, develops and produces air-conditioning and ventilation systems for commercial and special vehicles.

The Eberspaecher Group’s Exhaust Technology Division will operate as the “Purem by Eberspaecher” brand. The automotive supplier is thus strengthening the operational independence of the area and expanding opportunities for global cooperation with other companies. Eberspaecher remains the owner of the subsidiary. ´

When Eberspächer acquired Vairex air systems, the automotive supplier entered the hydrogen and fuel cell technology market. Both areas show environmental benefits in the course of decarbonization. Eberspächer develops and produces components and systems for mobility and stationary applications, including air compressors for fuel cell systems or exhaust systems for the hydrogen engine. ´

== Products ==
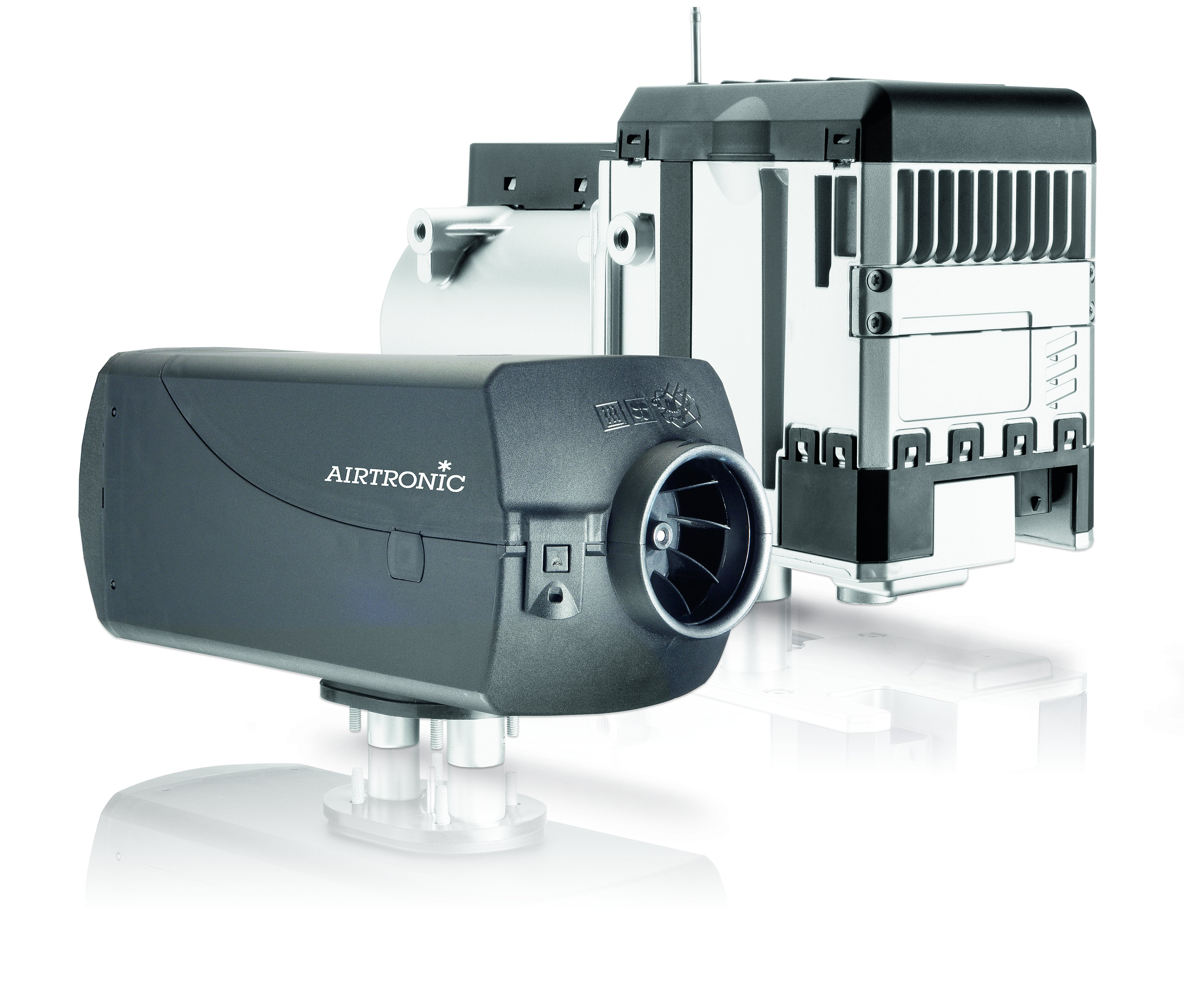
Eberspächer Airtronic D4 and Hydronic M

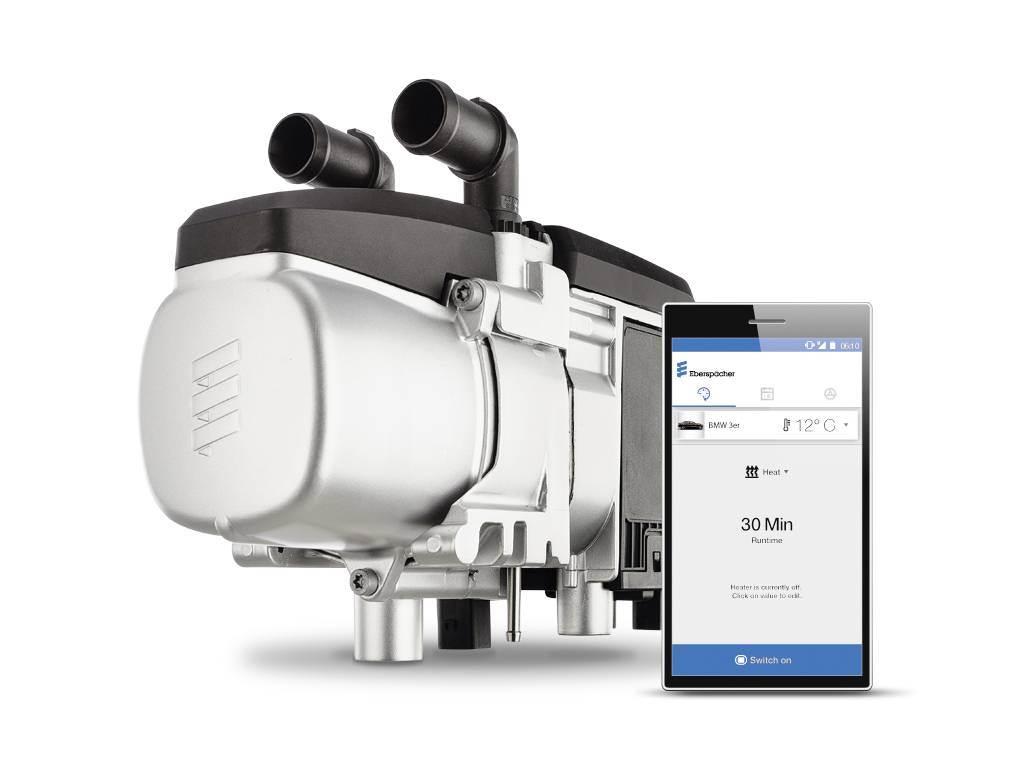
Eberspächer Hydronic S3 Economy water heater with operating element EasyStart Web

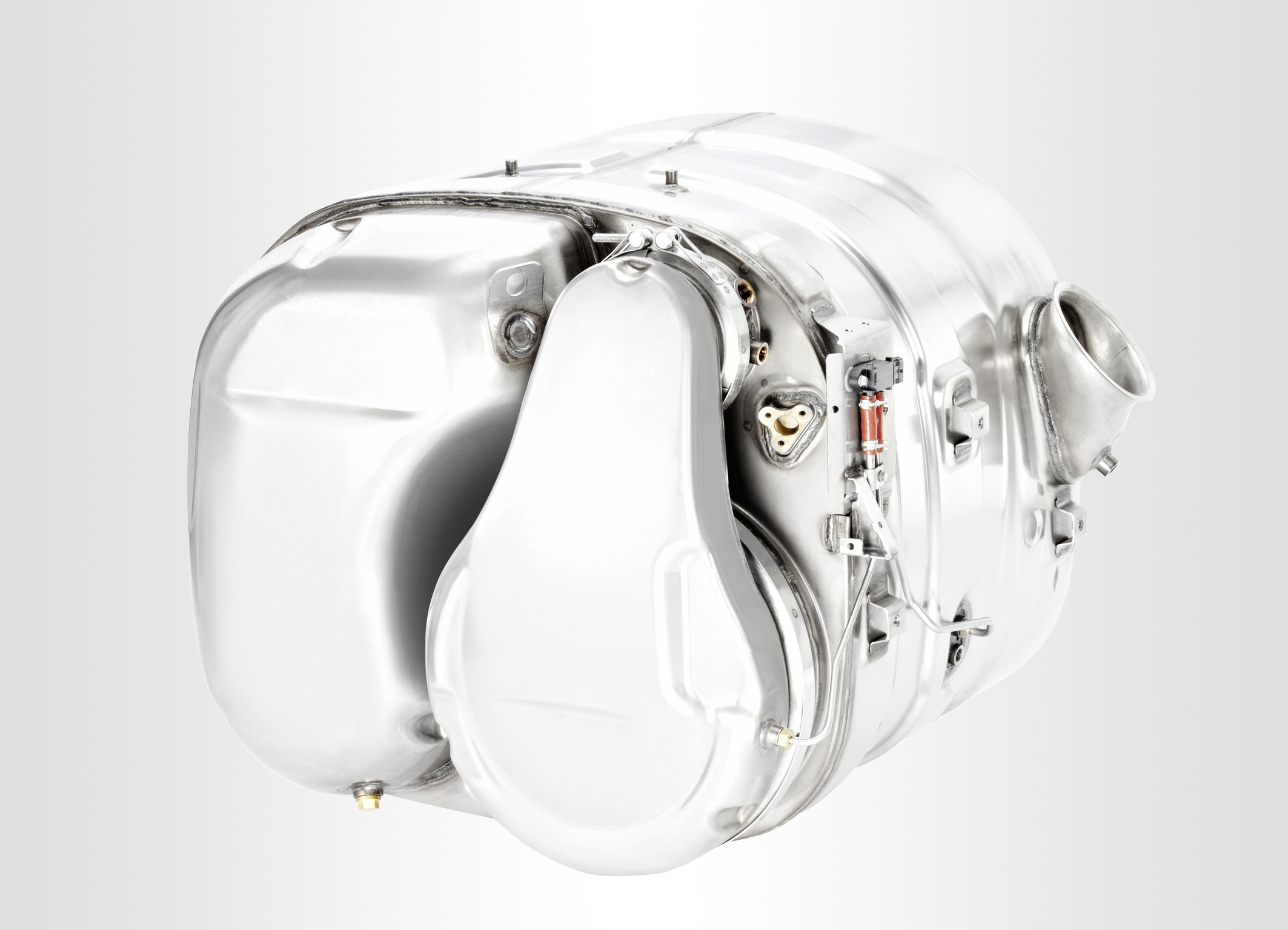
Eberspächer Euro-6 exhaust system for commercial vehicles

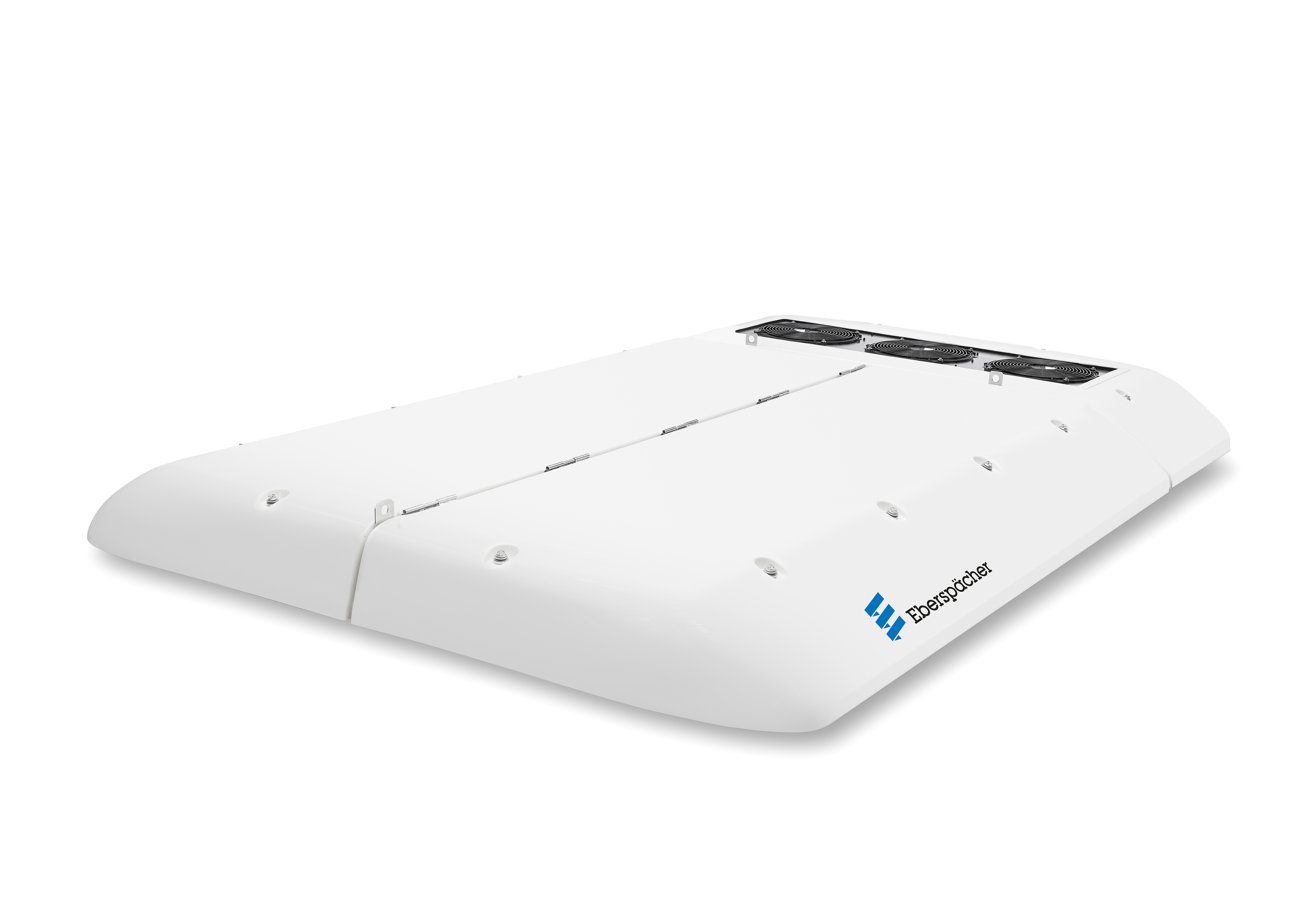
Bus AC Solutions - roof-mounted air conditioning AC 353 4th generation

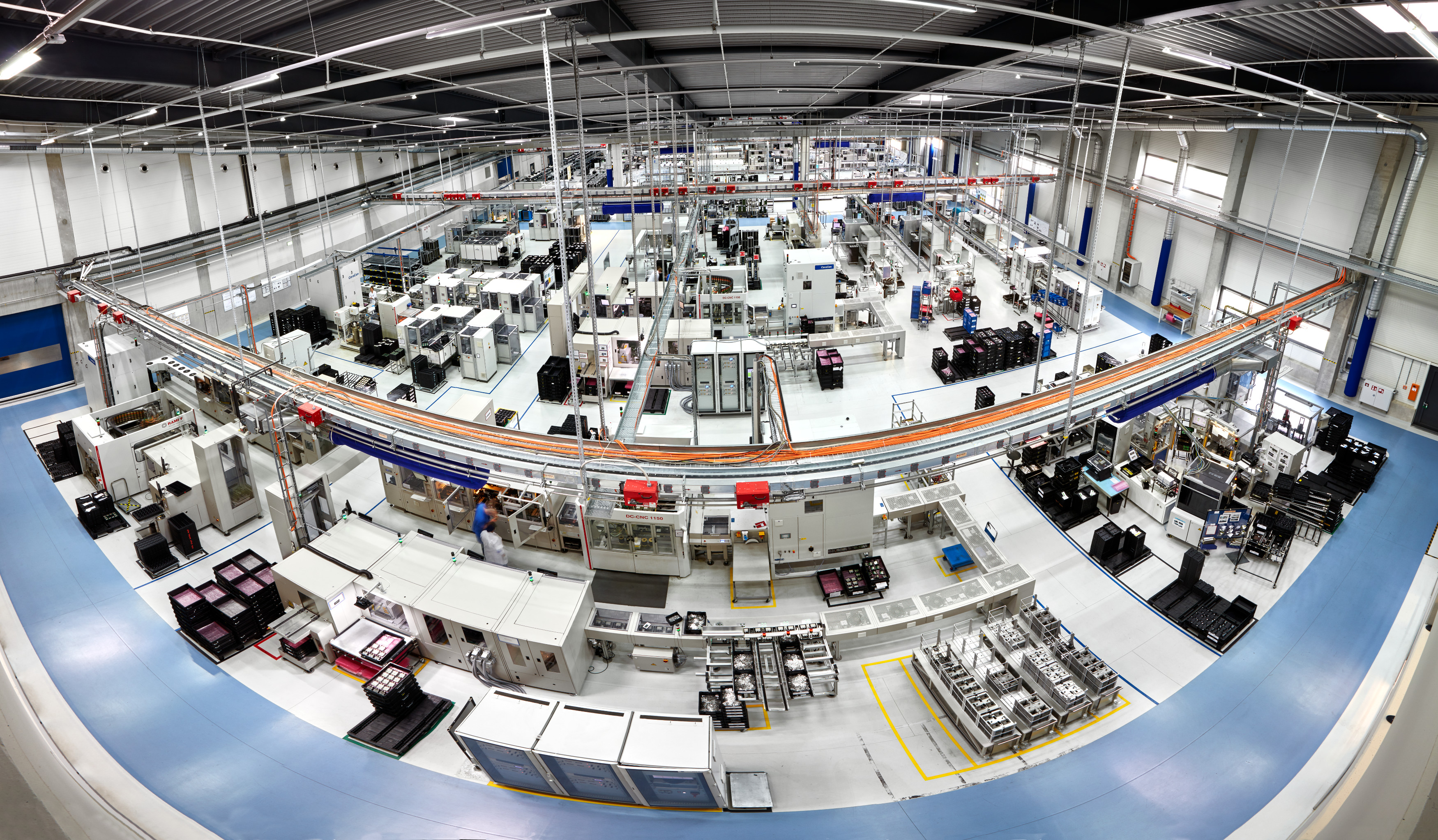
Eberspächer Automotive Controls production at Landau

=== Fuel Operated Heaters ===
- Parking Heater Systems (motor independent water- and air-heaters with power between 1 and 35 kW) for passenger cars, commercial vehicles, construction machines and boats. (link Gasoline heater)
- Auxiliary Heaters for consumption-optimized direct injection cars (diesel or petrol) as well as electric and hybrid vehicles.
- Technical Support by international subsidiaries and over 13,000 service partners and specialized dealers worldwide.

=== Electrical Heaters ===
Eberspächer catem specializes in electrical auxiliary heaters. The PTC heater can be adapted to the requirements of any vehicle model and used as a de-central system, too; e.g. as head-space heating system in a convertible located in the headrest. Serial production of high-voltage heating systems (up to 500 V, up to 7 kW) for hybrid, electrical and fuel-cell vehicles is located in Germany (Herxheim, Pfalz). In Tianjin, China, high-voltage water heaters and low-voltage air heaters, among other things, have been manufactured since 2018. With completion in 2023, a new plant in Ruse, Bulgaria will serve as an additional site for the production of electrical heaters.

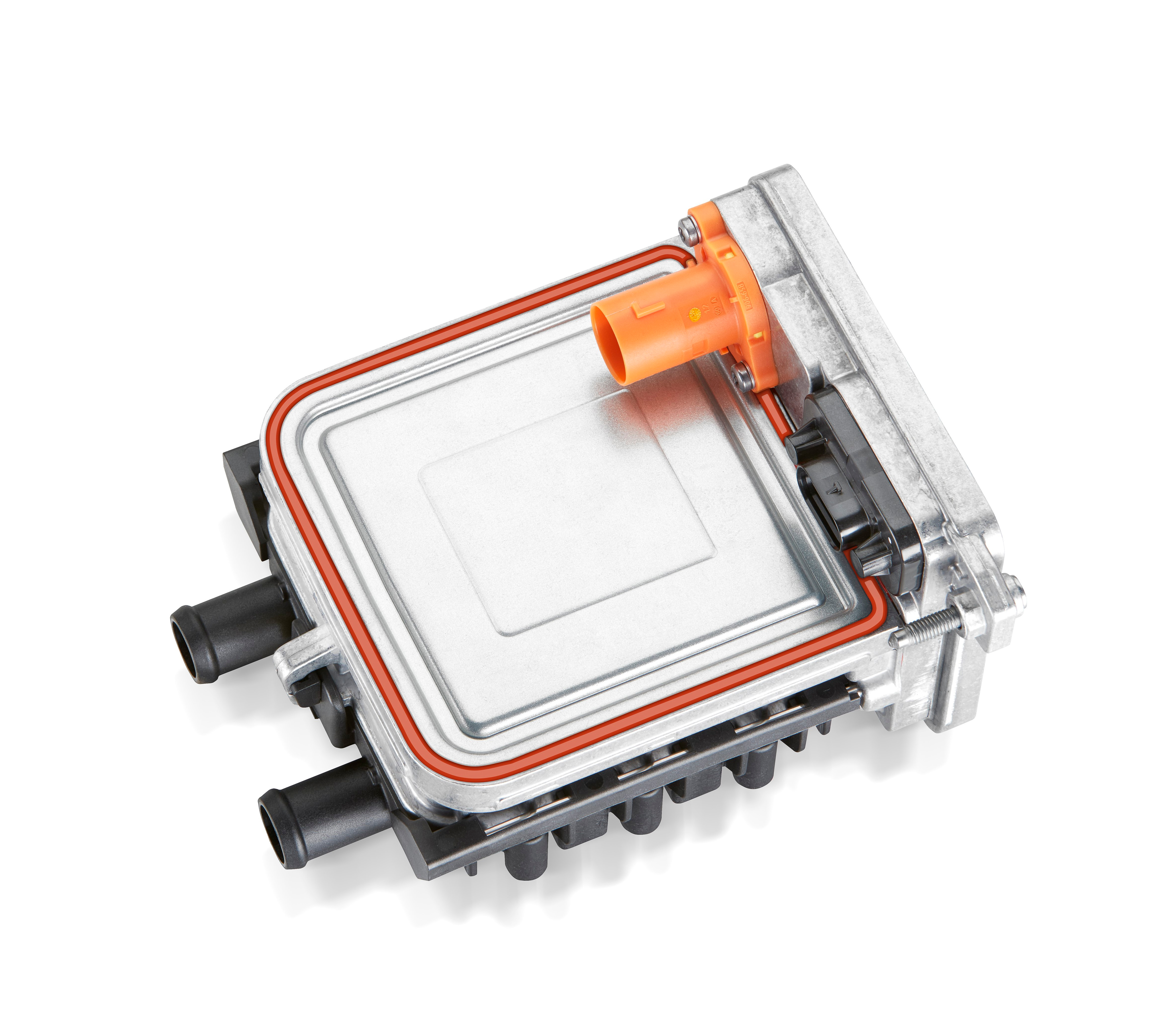
Eberspächer PTC coolant heater 3rd Generation

=== Exhaust Technology ===
- Exhaust-gas after-treatment, noise damping, sound design
- Complete exhaust gas systems, catalytic converters, diesel particulate filters, silencers, tubes, manifolds for passenger cars and commercial vehicles (on-road / non-road)
- As system developer / system supplier Eberspächer provides logistical full-service with just in sequence production through on-site assemblies at vehicle manufacturers plant gates.

In January 2014 Eberspächer started production at the new site in the Saxon city of Wilsdruff, Dresden. The new plant is customised especially to the production of commercial vehicle exhaust systems in accordance with the Euro 6 standard, which has been applicable for all commercial vehicles in Europe since 1 January 2014.

Since the end of 2011 the company has developed and produces exhaust systems for medium- and heavy-duty vehicles in Sweden.

The North and South America business for commercial vehicles exhaust systems is served from the production site in Brighton, Michigan, which was enlarged in 2016. The plant is specifically designed for the production of exhaust systems that meet the strict EPA 2010 emissions standard and serves as a "center of excellence". The site Ramos Arizpe near Saltillo, Mexico, opened in 2021, complements the local presence with the production of exhaust gas purification systems for passenger cars and commercial vehicles.

European manufacturing capacities of exhaust systems for passenger cars were expanded in 2016 through a new plant in Romania and the production site in Tondela, Portugal which is in operation since 2017.

In 2021 Eberspächer introduces the product range Active Heating Solutions. These solutions heat up the exhaust gas purification system in the cold-start phase and improve exhaust emission conversion at the start of the journey. This is an important step to meet new emission legislations such as EURO 7. The Exhaust Technology Division of Eberspächer will operate as Purem by Eberspächer brand.

In 2022 Eberspächer forms a new joint venture with AAPICO Hitech Public Company Limited. The joint venture company Purem Aapico Co., Ltd. will manufacture and supply exhaust emission control systems and components for commercial vehicles and passenger cars in Thailand and the ASEAN market to meet the highest emission standards. Start of production is planned for the third quarter of 2023.

=== Thermal Management ===
Eberspächer Sütrak develops, manufactures and sells a comprehensive range of climate solutions for buses with conventional as well as electric, fuel-cell or hybrid drive. The subsidiary has sites and plants in Germany (Renningen), Poland, Mexico India and Brazil. Air-conditioning systems of special vehicles are made too.

=== Automotive Controls ===
The Automotive Controls division, provides a variety of vehicle electronics applications, such as electronic control units for start-stop systems or control units for vehicle heaters. This division also develops and manufactures electronic systems such as systems for the electrical interim storage of reclaimed braking energy. The subsidiary Eberspächer Controls is a specialist for electronic controls and for switching and distributing high voltages in the vehicle. The subsidiary has its own production facility in Landau/Pfalz (Germany) and supplies automotive manufacturers. In Cluj-Napoca, Romania, development activities of control units for autonomous driving with hardware and software components have been advanced since 2021.

=== Components and solutions for fuel cell systems and the hydrogen engine ===
- Air compressors, controllers as well as silencers for mobile and stationary fuel cell applications
- Valve technology, that not only positively influences the durability of fuel cell systems but also enables the silent operation of such systems
- Exhaust systems for hydrogen engines, since even the combustion of “clean” hydrogen produces emissions that need aftertreatment

== Production Sites ==
The production sites for fuel operated heaters and electrical heaters are located in Germany, England, Poland and China, for thermal management systems in Germany, Poland, Brazil, India and Mexico. Exhaust Technology sites are based in Germany, France, Czech Republic, England, Sweden, South Africa, USA, Brazil, Mexico, Portugal, Romania, India, Russia and China. Production of automotive electronics is based in Germany and China.

== Performance Indicators Financial Year 2025 ==
- Gross revenue: 4,979.8M €; net revenue (without transitory items): 2,531.3M €
- Research and development expenses: 37.1M €
- Number of employees: 10,374
