= 1980 24 Hours of Le Mans =

24-hour automobile endurance race

Previous: 1979	Next: 1981
Index: Races | Winners

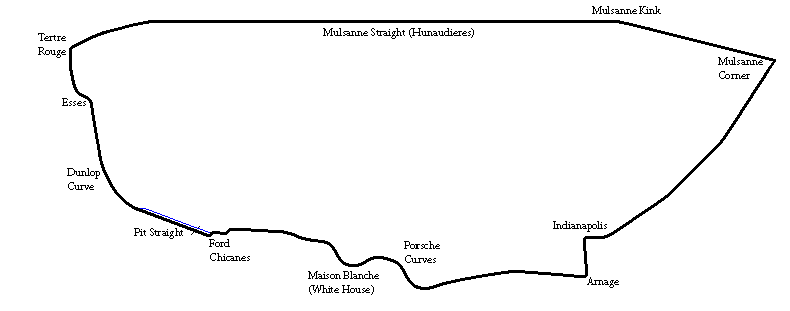
Le Mans in 1980

The 1980 24 Hours of Le Mans was the 48th Grand Prix of Endurance, and took place on 14 and 15 June 1980. It was the seventh round of both the World Championship for Makes and World Challenge for Endurance Drivers. With neither the Porsche nor Renault works teams contesting the big Group 6 sports-cars for outright victory, it left the prospects open for a privateer victory from Joest, Rondeau or De Cadenet, or from Group 5 again, if they were to fail. The wet weather throughout the race further added to the uncertainty, reducing the advantage of the more powerful cars.

The race started in a downpour and the rain continued off and on throughout the race. The first half of the race saw a number of the favoured teams hold the lead for extended periods, until one by one they suffered delays or mechanical issues. By dawn it was the Joest Porsche special (driven by Jacky Ickx with Reinhold Joest) that held a 2-lap lead over Jean Rondeau in his own car, and John Fitzpatrick in the Dick Barbour 935. But when Joest pitted at 10am having lost top gear, the half-hour stop cost four laps and put the Frenchmen into the lead. Hard driving by Ickx got him back onto the lead lap again. A sudden squall at 1pm sent both cars aquaplaning off at the fast Dunlop Curve, fortunately without doing any major damage to either. When another rain shower appeared in the last hour, Ickx dived for the pits to put on wet tyres, while Jaussaud bravely stayed out on his slicks. This time Ickx could not make up the lost time and the French took a significant victory: Jean Rondeau gained the unique achievement of winning Le Mans driving a car of his own manufacture, with his other team car coming in third.

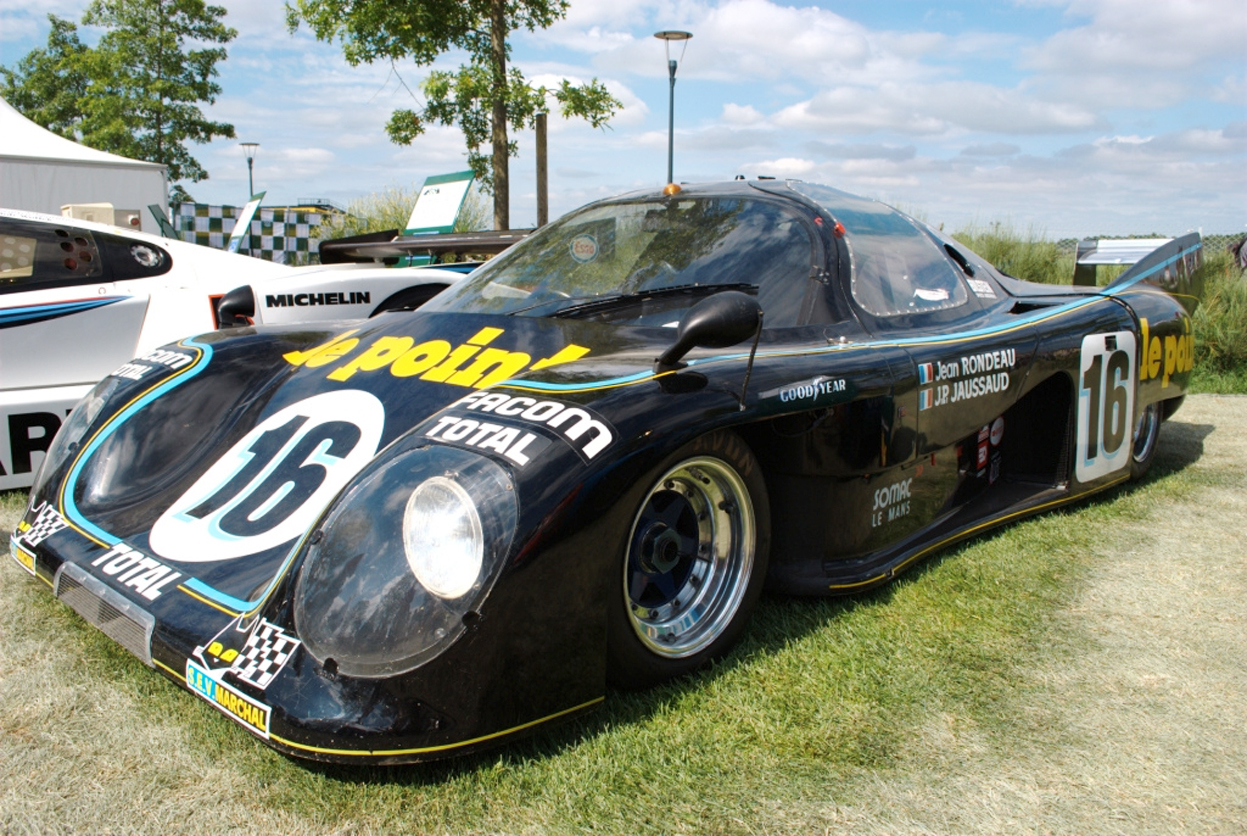
The race-winning Rondeau M379

== Regulations ==
The introduction of the new Group 5 and Group 6 categories in 1976 had not helped sports-car racing – it forced most manufacturers to choose between one or the other. The World Championship for Makes was stuttering and the small fields left the spectators disinterested which, in turn, dissuaded sponsors to invest. The strongest competition was found in the IMSA series in North America. After five years of going alone, the Automobile Club de l'Ouest (ACO) returned to the World Championship, becoming the series' premier race, and easily with its biggest field.

True to its founding objective to stage a test of endurance and technical innovation, this year the ACO introduced a number of new regulations designed to encourage greater reliability and efficiency over raw speed. However, there were a few unforeseen repercussions that caused controversy. All cars were now limited to a maximum fuel tank volume of 120 litres, and refuelling would run at a fixed rate of 50 litres per minute. This meant that pitstops that used to take around 30–40 seconds would now take over 2 minutes. Alternative fuel-types were also now permitted. A minimum distance of 25 laps had to be done between fuel and oil stops (effectively a fuel economy of 29 litres per 100 km, or 8mpg). A maximum of four pitcrew would be allowed to work on a car at a time.

This year, entries had to have either two or three drivers. Qualifying would be done by the average time of each car's drivers. The FIA qualifying rules were that each car had to be within 130% of the pole time and also within 110% of their class leader – although, the ACO allowed a team to drop their third driver for the race if they wanted a better grid position or, more importantly, were at risk of not qualifying. Formerly this was done on the Wednesday and Thursday however this year only a single, 5-hour session on Thursday would count toward qualification. The idea was to flush out amateur drivers who may be a liability to other drivers from being too slow. However, it did not take into account the vagaries of the weather and with constant rain on Thursday, it left only a very short window in the twilight for teams to get all their drivers qualified.

The other significant change was the ban on replacing the major components after the start of Qualifying until the end of the race. This applied to engines and gearboxes, while allowing a single turbo replacement. This was put in to stop the use of fragile, high-powered "qualifying engines" to get a high grid spot then swapped out before the race. But again, this compromised the race for cars that might have unforeseen issues with their race-engine during practice.

Drivers were only allowed to drive for four hours at a time, with a minimum one-hour break between stints, and a 14-hour maximum drive overall. To be classified as a finisher, a car had to complete their final lap before 4.15pm and to have covered at least 70% of the winner's distance. Also, the ACO's hors course rules were now discarded, where cars were disqualified if they had fallen over 30% behind the leader at the 12-hour mark.

The Index of Energy Efficiency returned. This was the ratio of total fuel used versus a calculated target. It was designed to encourage development of more efficient engine technology and was measured as at the final pit-stop. The winner would receive 5000FF. This would be the last Le Mans overseen by Charles Deutsch as race director, retiring from the position he had held since 1969 after a career as a car-builder. Deutsch died only six months later.

== Entries ==
Despite now being a part of the World Championship again, the ACO still needed to open its entry list to the IMSA series to guarantee something approaching a reasonable line-up. As it was, this was one of the weakest entry lists for a decade with no manufacturer works cars in the main Group 6 class. Only Porsche, Lancia and BMW entered works teams, and none went head-to-head in the same class. From 87 applications, this year the ACO now accepted 70 to qualify for 50 starting spots. However, they later changed that to just accept 65 cars for scrutineering but kept the regular 55 starting spots. The largest category this year, by a clear margin, was the IMSA class with 22 applications, bolstered with a number of North American cars.

Class	Large-engines >2.0L classes	Medium-engines < 2.0L classes	Turbo engines
Group 6 S Sports	8 / 6	11 / 8	1 / 1
Group 5 SP Special Production	8 / 7	3 / 3	11 / 10
Group 4 GTS Special GT	5 / 5	-	5 / 5
GTP Le Mans GT Prototype	7 / 7	-	4 / 4
GTX Le Mans GT Experimental	1 / 1	-	0
IMSA GTX / GTO	21 / 17	-	8 / 7
Total Entries	50 / 43	14 / 11	20

- Note: The first number is the number of arrivals, the second the number who started.

=== Group 6 and GTP ===
Porsche had announced the end of its Group 6 program, and Mirage was not entered. This left the Group 6 class wide open to the gentleman-constructors. Le Mans local Jean Rondeau bought three cars. Using the same chassis as the previous year, they were fitted with longer bodyshells and new wings in sleek black livery. Swiss engine-specialist Heini Mader detuned the Ford-Cosworth DFV engines down to 460 bhp. One had ballast to make it up to the minimum weight required for the GTP class. As always, Rondeau would drive one of his cars, this year paired with 1978 winner (with Renault Alpine) Jean-Pierre Jaussaud. The second car had another Le Mans hero, Henri Pescarolo with rally specialist Jean Ragnotti. The GTP car was driven by Belgian endurance racers, brothers Jean-Michel and Philippe Martin who had won the 1979 Spa 24 Hours in a Ford Capri. With no sports-car experience they approached Englishman Gordon Spice as a co-driver (who had done the same things the year earlier). He brought the experienced Keith Greene (latterly of De Cadenet and Dome) as team manager.

Alain de Cadenet had been bringing his own Lola-derived cars to Le Mans since 1973 and this year was a genuine contender after victories in the World Championship rounds at Monza and Silverstone. With a Cosworth DFV tuned by New Zealander John Nicholson it could reach 335 kp/h (210 mph). His co-drivers were François Migault and South African Desiré Wilson. Nick Faure entered the older De Cadenet he had recently bought off Peter Lovett. Ian Bracey returned after a one-year hiatus with his IBEC project. Originally based around a Hesketh Formula 1 chassis, it had been considerably reworked by ADA Engineering and using a Cosworth prepared by John Dunn at his Swindon workshop. The drivers would be Tony Trimmer and Tiff Needell.

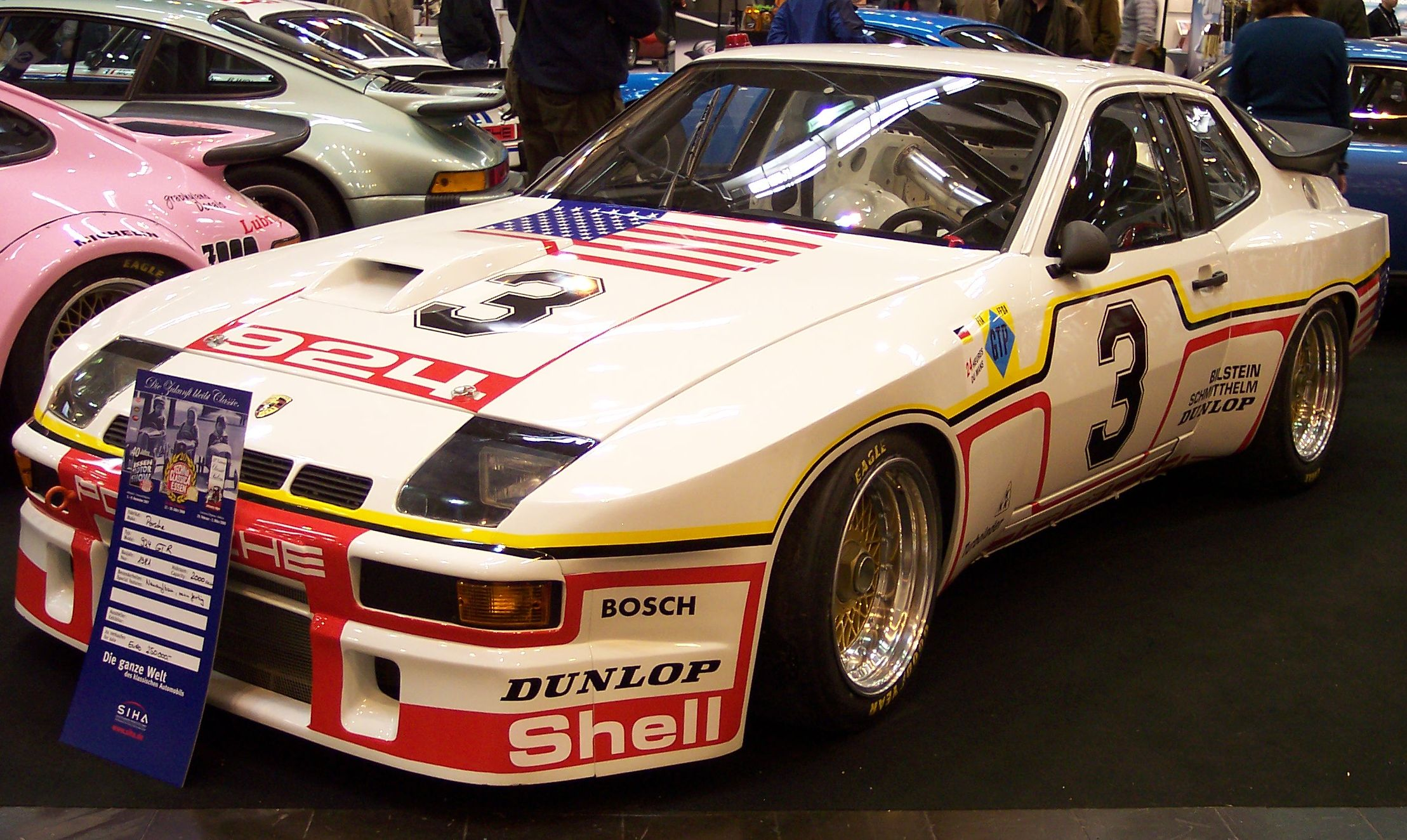
Porsche 924 Carrera

The Japanese company Dome returned after an underwhelming debut the previous year. The new RL80 still had the distinctive low, wedge-shaped design of Masao Ono but was now 18" shorter and 3" wider. Improved suspension and aerodynamics made it one of the fastest Group 6 cars, getting up to 345 kp/h (215 mph). Regular team drivers Chris Craft and Bob Evans did an 18-hour trouble-free test at the Suzuka racetrack. André Chevalley had adapted the Lola T286 he had brought last year. Fitted with an aerodynamic shell designed by Swiss engineering students, it had another Cosworth engine tuned by Heini Mader that had qualified it on the front row at Silverstone. At Le Mans, it would be driven by Chevalley with Patrick Gaillard and François Trisconi.

With Porsche officially pulling out of Group 6, it was Reinhold Joest who would take on the Cosworths. In 1972 he had asked the company to loan an old Porsche 908, and then had finished 3rd at Le Mans. At the end of 1979 he again approached the company to use a Porsche 936 for Le Mans. He was already running a turbo-charged 908/3 in the World Championship. Porsche declined but allowed him to make a replica. Fitted with panels of a 936/77 from Porsche, it had a 2.1-litre twin-turbo as used on the 1977 car, that could generate 550 bhp on race boost. Porsche also would not allow him to call it a '936' so it was entered as the "908/J80". With sponsorship from Martini & Rossi Joest was able to entice Jacky Ickx out of his retirement after winning the 1979 Can-Am championship. Their third driver was Michel Leclère.

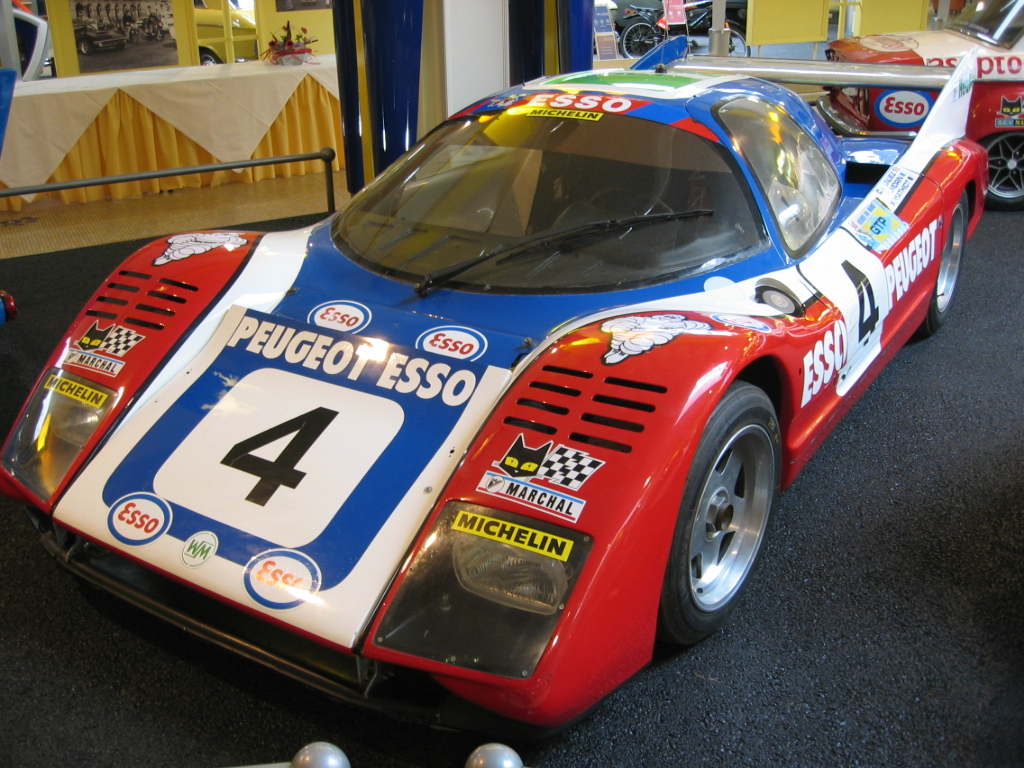
WM P79/80

Instead Porsche arrived with three cars in the GTP category. The 924 Carrera was not meant for contesting outright victory but as a preamble for Group 4 and customer sales. Until homologation came through, it had to compete in GTP – as a true GT prototype. This was a significant step for Porsche, as these were their first front-engined cars to compete at Le Mans. The 2-litre turbo engine produced 320 bhp but the heavier weight of the car only got it to 280 kp/h (175 mph). This could be compensated for, to an extent, by its excellent handling and good fuel economy (22 laps on a tank of fuel compared to just 12 laps for a 935). Unusual for the time, the cars were equipped with onboard pneumatic air-jacks. For the three markets, they were given German, British and American crews respectively: test driver Günther Steckkönig joined Jürgen Barth and Manfred Schurti in one; Andy Rouse/Tony Dron had the second while American endurance experts Peter Gregg/Al Holbert had the third.

The small Parisian concern of WM did further refinement on their P79 design. With no full-time staff, Gérard Welter (Peugeot's head of design), Michel Meunier (Peugeot engineer) and their volunteer crew produced three cars with improved suspension, and a new tail-end tested at the Paris wind-tunnel. The 2.7-litre Peugeot V6 engines with twin KKK (Kühnle, Kopp & Kausch) turbos now had 4-valves per cylinder and put out 500 bhp getting the cars up to 350 kp/h (218 mph), the fastest cars on the straight by a clear margin. They entered the three cars with their characteristic all-French crews. A new race novelty was the live broadcast from a camera mounted in the Dorchy/Fréquelin WM. Sent via a helicopter link to the big screen in the Village, it gave the spectators the driver's-eye view racing around the track.

=== Group 6 (2-litre) ===
Eleven cars were entered for this class, its usual mix of small teams running Lolas, Chevrons or their own specialist cars. The French engine-builder team, Société ROC, was again the team to beat, this time broadening its entry with two Lolas alongside the Chevron. Their ROC engine now put out 285 bhp and the faster Lolas could get up to 280 kp/h (175 mph). Jean-Marie Lemerle also ran a Lola-ROC with a long-tail, while an ex-ROC team car, now fitted with a BMW engine, was entered by Jean-Philippe Grand, who had Yves Courage as a co-driver.

Dorset Racing were back with their Lola-Ford, driven by Martin Birrane, Peter Clark and Pink Floyd drummer Nick Mason. There were also two French Lola-BMWs entered by Michel Elkoubi and Patrice Gaulupeau, the latter fitted with Kevlar panels making it 30 kg lighter.

This year, the Osella Squadra Corse had taken the big move up from Formula 2 to Formula 1, while still developing very fast, nimble sports cars. The new PA8 model again used the BMW 2-litre motor, tuned for endurance racing at the BMW factory. Producing 290 bhp, it could get up to 320 kp/h (200 mph) (although 280 kp/h was its top speed at the circuit.) Managed by the F1 team-manager, Luis Peano, top female driver Lella Lombardi was paired with newcomer Mark Thatcher, son of the British Prime Minister. After a disappointing run the previous year with the ToJ, Frenchman Hubert Striebig had set about rebuilding it from the floor up. Although keeping the BMW engine, it had new suspension and a longer, lower bodyshell. Canadian Walter Wolf had recently pulled out of Formula One after a short, spectacular tenure. This year he entered a Swiss Cheetah G-601 with a Cosworth prepared by Marc Frischknecht and driven by regular Cheetah drivers Sandro Plastina and Mario Luini, along with Frischknecht.

=== Group 5 (over 2-litre) ===
With the knowledge of a new sports car formula coming up in 1982 there was little incentive for new car development. The Porsche 935 was easily the dominant Group 5 car and there were 15 of them entered this year across the Group 5 and IMSA classes. The success of the Kremer brothers the previous year had put their modification workshop in high demand – selling 13 of their 935 K3 models. They entered three of their latest variants for their own teams: Rolf Stommelen, Axel Plankenhorn and Japanese Tetsu Ikuzawa; Americans Ted Field and Danny Ongais would race with Jean-Louis Lafosse while Anne-Charlotte Verney moved up from Group 4 to race with Xavier Lapeyre and acclaimed French actor-comedian Jean-Louis Trintignant. The new version had improved rear suspension, Kugelfischer fuel-injection and larger induction inlets, which all helped to lift the power output up to 660 bhp.

Perennial rival, Georg Loos, had used his money to secure a final, one-off, Porsche 935 from the factory. His 935/80 was modelled on the unique 935/78 "Moby Dick" from 1978, and was fitted with a 3160cc twin-turbo engine. The spaceframe chassis utilised the latest Porsche concepts in suspension and a shell using composite panels. This 'special edition' was given to Bob Wollek and Helmut Kelleners. Other teams in the World Championship arrived with their 935s: Dieter Schornstein's Vegla Racing from Germany, Claude Haldi's Swiss Meccarillos Racing, Britain's Charles Ivey Racing with its K3.

The only opposition to the Porsche 935s in Group 5 was from a modified Triumph TR8 entered by the British Janspeed team. The 3.56-litre Rover V8 was boosted by twin Rotomaster turbos and a dry-sump system while the suspension was completely revised and fitted with 12" disc brakes. Enthusiastically supported by the British TR-owners club, its drivers would be Ian Harrower, John Sheldon and John Brindley.

=== Group 5 (2-litre) ===
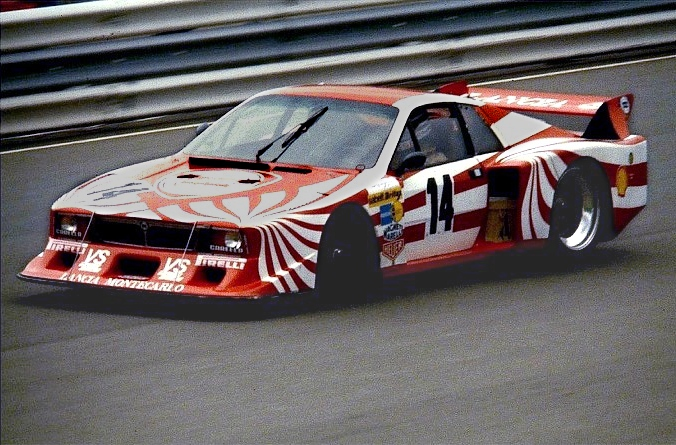
Lancia MonteCarlo Turbo

The World Championship was being run in two divisions – over and under 2-litres with the champion being whichever team scored the most points in either of the categories. Lancia therefore saw an opportunity to steal Porsche's thunder in the under-represented 2-litre class. The Montecarlo was the model chosen to contest in sportscar races and rallying. Cesare Fiorio's works team did extensive development over the close season. The mid-mounted 1425cc four-cylinder had a KKK-turbo and Bosch fuel-injection, putting out 410 bhp. Built at Dallara, with aerodynamics by Pininfarina, the 1980 version had been lightened and with tailor-made Pirelli tyres, could now get up to 280 kp/h (175 mph). Confidence was high with six from six wins in the championship, including commendable outright wins at Mugello and Brands Hatch. With championship points the prime objective, the turbo-boost would be wound down from 1.4 to 1.2bar to protect the engines. Two works cars arrived, driven by Hans Heyer/Teo Fabi and Piercarlo Ghinzani/Gianfranco Brancatelli. Rally drivers Bernard Darniche and Markku Alén were also added to the team. As in the WCM, they were also supported by the Italian Jolly Club customer team running a car for their current ETCC champions Martino Finotto and Carlo Facetti.

=== IMSA and GTX ===
With Porsche no longer building the 935 model (aside from the one-off Gelo car), there was a market space for racing specialists to upgrade the current fleet. IMSA-GTX rules were a variant of the Group 5 specifications, and after the car's dominance the previous year, had added 40 kg minimum weight to the twin-turbo version as a Balance of Performance. Dick Barbour was back at Le Mans, and using the maxim "if you can't beat them, join them", had bought three of the Kremer brothers' modified Porsche 935/K3s. One was a brand new K3/80 version with its uprated 3.2-litre engine, and Bosch injectors. Barbour would drive it with John Fitzpatrick and Brian Redman. The chassis that came second the year before was refitted and given to Bobby Rahal, Bob Garretson and Australian-based Canadian Allan Moffat.

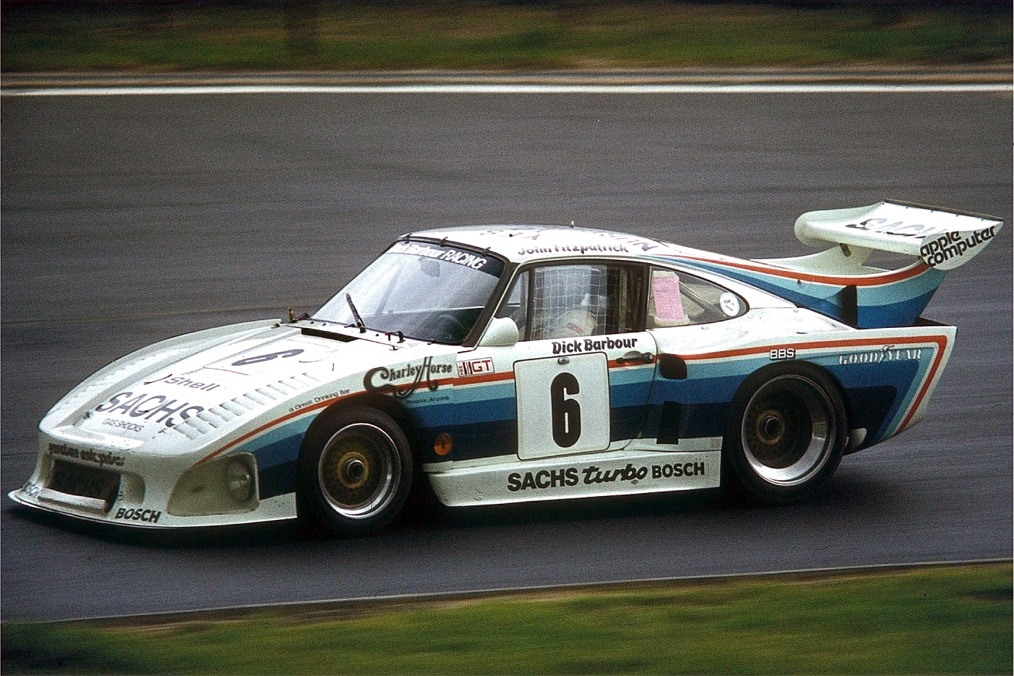
Porsche 935-K3

After winning at their first attempt last year, the Whittington brothers had also updated their 935 with a Kremer K3/80 kit. With Bill still injured from the Indianapolis 500, 20-year old brother Dale Whittington took his place, and they brought endurance expert Hurley Haywood on-board as the third driver. Similarly the Racing Associates team of Charles Mendez entered two cars fitted with K3/80 body kits, while still sporting twin-turbos. John Paul's JLP Racing was competing on both sides of the Atlantic for the Endurance Drivers' Challenge. Using the JLP-2, their own development of the 935 with a hefty NASCAR roll-cage, Paul had finished third at Silverstone with Redman. For Le Mans, he partnered up with his son and Englishman Guy Edwards.

But Porsche was not going to have a walkover in the class, with six different marques represented. Against the nine Porsches, there were six Ferrari 512 BBs. Parisian Charles Pozzi had three cars entered by JMS Racing. Now 100 kg lighter, the cars could get up to 310 kp/h (195 mph) on the Hunaudières Straight. They had three experienced crews, with Claude Ballot-Léna/Jean-Claude Andruet in one, Belgian ETCC team-mates Pierre Dieudonné/Jean Xhenceval in the second and Lucien Guitteny leading the third. Pozzi's cars were all equipped with onboard radios. The other Ferraris were an international collection – the American North American Racing Team, Steve O'Rourke's EMKA team and the Italian Scuderia Bellancauto.

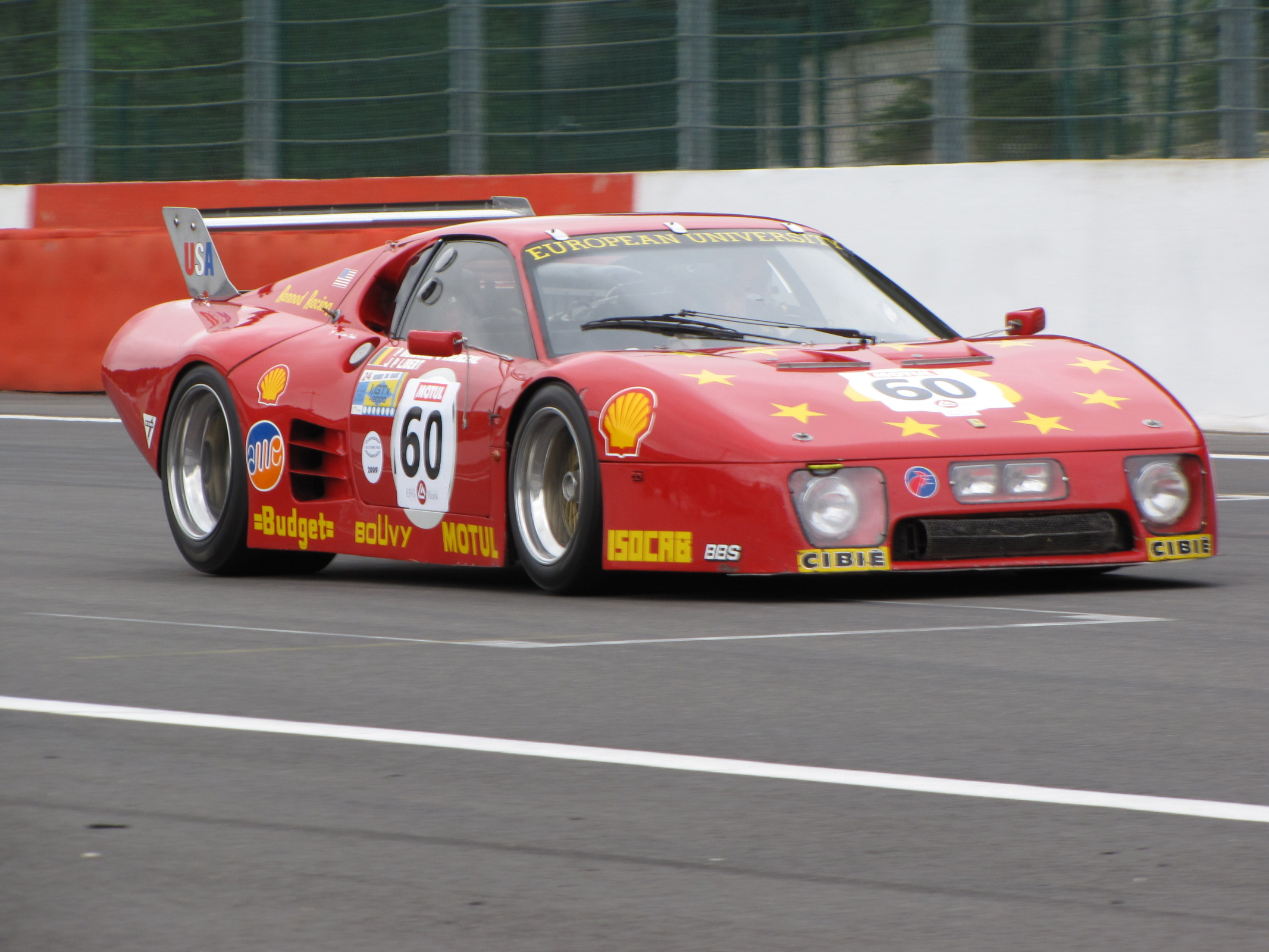
Ferrari 512 BB LM

BMW had secured its one-make Procar series as support races to Formula 1 Grands Prix. Six of the mid-engined BMW M1s were entered this year (although Hervé Poulain did not, in the end, arrive with another Art Car). The anachronistic March silhouette version had been heavily reworked since its failure to qualify the previous year. Now shorter, narrower and with aluminium panels, it was about 15% lighter than the production versions but with a top speed of 310 kp/h (195 mph) it was no quicker. Of the others, BMW works driver Manfred Winkelhock was loaned to accompany Patrick Nève and Michael Korten. Although entered by BMW-France and privateer Dominique Lacaud, their cars were prepared by the factory. Both had works co-drivers with Hans-Joachim Stuck/Hans-Georg Bürger co-driving with Lacaud, and Didier Pironi/Pierre Dieudonné/Marcel Mignot for BMW-France. In lieu of an art-car, the BMW-France car featured a map spotlighting its dealers across the country. Two other French M1 privateers were entered in the Le Mans-GTX category, however scrutineers ruled against the set-up of their rear wings. François Servanin therefore chose to enter the broader IMSA class, while the Garage du Bac crew moved their car's wing to comply, staying as the only entry in the GTX class.

Mazda was gaining confidence in endurance racing with their rotary engines, competing successfully in the IMSA GTU category with the RX-7. This year, an entry was placed by New Jersey Mazda dealer Pierre Honegger, with the car prepared by NASCAR specialists Holman-Moody. With the FIA's 2:1 equivalence factor for rotaries, the small 1146cc 12A engine was rated as 2.3-litres and produced 260 bhp. Another Japanese manufacturer being drawn into endurance racing was Toyota. Tachi Oiwa Motor Sports (TOM'S) was racing the Toyota Celica against Nissans in the Fuji Silhouette Series. Toyota Deutschland had worked with Schnitzer Motorsport to race another Celica by Rolf Stommelen in the German Group 5 series. This year, TOMS coordinated with Dome to develop an IMSA-GTX spec car with a modified body. The 2.1-litre turbo engine of the German series was replaced with a 2.8-litre, 600 bhp, turbo instead. Team principal Nobuhide Tachi would drive, alongside Fumiyaso Sato.

The last IMSA competitors were two Canadian Chevrolets: Mo Carter's Camaro had finished fourth at Daytona, while Doug Rowe had a brand new Corvette. Both were prepared at Brad Francis' Descon workshop and both had the 640 bhp, 7-litre Chevrolet engines. Unfortunately, they would be so thirsty as to require refuelling every 30 minutes or so.

=== Group 4 GT ===
Once again the meagre GT class was the sole preserve of Porsche. There were three French 934 turbos, from the ASA Cachia and Alméras teams and privateer Georges Bourdillat, as well as one from Puerto Rican Diego Febles. The fifth car was a 911 SC turbo entered by Thierry Perrier. Choosing to run on a fuel mixture of 50:50 ethanol/gasoline meant he could take advantage of an ACO guaranteed entry for alternative technology.

== Practice and Qualifying ==
The new ACO limitations of a single qualifying session and an embargo on replacing engines proved extremely problematic. John Fitzpatrick put in the fastest lap in his Dick Barbour Porsche of 3:40.0 and although his veteran teammate Redman was almost as quick, the team average was pulled down by owner-driver Barbour to 3:48.4. Therefore it was the Rondeau of Pescarolo/Ragnotti that took the pole position with a qualifying average of 3:47.9. Third fastest was the soft-pink Gozzy-Kremer Group 5 935 of Ikuzawa/Stommelen/Plankenhorn doing 3:49.8 while the Ickx/Joest Porsche set a 3:50.0 flat, in fourth just ahead of Rondeau/Jaussaud (3:50.2).

De Cadenet's crew had replaced the engine and gearbox on Wednesday night. Then on Thursday, Desiré Wilson had a major crash in practice when she hit the barrier by the Ford chicane and rolled the De Cadenet several times. The ACO also managed to "lose" the time for her single dry lap. Although the team worked overnight to repair the car, because Wilson had apparently not set a qualifying time, she had to be dropped from the driver-team. The Porsche works team also had a bad week. Their regular test driver Günther Steckkonig was rushed to hospital with kidney failure. Then Peter Gregg had a serious road accident on the way to the circuit for practice. Avoiding a local driver who turned right in front of him, the car rolled giving Gregg a whiplash and concussion. With blurred vision, he was not able to race. His replacement, to race with Al Holbert, would be their other very experienced works driver, Derek Bell. Not surprisingly, as essentially GT cars, they were well off the pace of the other GTP and Group 6 cars and all had issues with their fuelling systems. The Bell/Holbert car was the fastest, starting 34th (4:10.8), eleven seconds behind the Spice/Martin/Martin Rondeau in 19th. The 'British' car was 44th (4:16.5) and German one 46th (4:17.1).

Elsewhere, in Group 5 and IMSA, Stuck's BMW was the fastest of its type, with an average of 4:02.5 (23rd), well behind Fitzpatrick's Porsche. The fastest Ferrari fared better: the Pozzi-JMS car of Ballot-Léna/Andruet started 17th with a 3:58.4. The Lancias all qualified close together in the midfield, quickest being 26th (4:03.2). The Osella was the fastest in 2-litre Group 6, starting 32nd (4:08.6), with Thatcher only six seconds slower than his experienced co-driver. Next in class, two seconds back, was the Sourd/Verdier ROC Lola (35th). After Wednesday practice, the Dorset Racing team had swapped out their Swindon BDX engine for a tried-and-tested Ford BDA. They qualified fifth in class, starting 45th on the grid. The final place on the grid was the Porsche running the ethanol-blend fuel.

There was also considerable controversy with the timekeeping and several errors, deliberate and accidental, were made ascribing times to drivers, leaving several teams greatly aggrieved. The organisation officials had great difficulty in tracking the times and the drivers setting them. Faure's De Cadenet lost its fourth gear in the last hour so the average time was too low to qualify. However, the team had evidence that previous times had been posted but missed by the ACO officials. It was stranger for the IBEC – Trimmer's times were attributed to Bracey who did not drive (and when the team pointed that out to the ACO, they docked those times too) and Needell's rain times were too slow to improve the average. A devastated Bracey raged about the ACO cheating, while a furious Faure called in French lawyers on the ACO.

In the IMSA class, neither of the two Canadian Chevs qualified (Carter's car had been mistakenly shipped to Amsterdam), nor did the Celica Turbo. The Group 5 Triumph had serious vibration issues that were just getting resolved but practice ended before enough fast laps could be done. Jean-Louis Trintignant had been well off the pace, but the ACO found a way for the French film-star to qualify in the Kremer Porsche. A number of teams had a degree of nervousness about their prospects for the race: the Rondeau/Jaussaud car developed a bad engine-vibration half an hour before the end of practice, which fortunately turned out to only be the ignition out of synch. On the Wednesday Chris Craft had a tyre come off his Dome at full speed approaching Mulsanne, and it happened again in the Thursday rain. The crew glued the tyres to the rims and both drivers got qualifying times later in the evening. The number of Group 6 cars not qualifying opened up spaces on the grid for the third ROC team car, the #25 Chevron, and the Mazda RX-7 to come in as first Reserve of the IMSA class, in 54th place. Not being allowed to change engines, the NART Ferrari of Preston Henn did not take the start after experiencing issues in practice. This allowed the British EMKA Ferrari in off the IMSA reserve list as a late replacement.

== Race ==
=== Start ===
Although the middle of the day was sunny, a thunderstorm with lightning swept the circuit as the teams lined up on the grid. It had only eased a bit as the cars started their formation lap. The crowd was equally divided with sentimental hope for Jacky Ickx to achieve his milestone fifth victory and partisan support for Jean Rondeau. Honorary starter this year was Joachim Springer, head of the ADAC (German motor-racing organisation). Amidst a mass of spray, Fitzpatrick swept past the Rondeau into the Dunlop Curve. Left behind on the grid was Striebig's Toj with sodden electrics. Ballot-Léna pitted after one lap, also with wet ignition. His two teammates also suffered the same during the first hour. An inauspicious start for the reserve Chevron-ROC, when it lost 40 minutes after only 3 laps repairing broken rear suspension.

Visibility was terrible and at one point John Paul put the wheels of his 935 on the grass at 290 kp/h (180 mph) thinking he was astride the road's centre- line and not the edge. 'Fitz' pitted from the lead after fifty minutes (11 laps), starting the pit-cycle. At the end of the first hour, as the rain finally started easing off, it was Bob Wollek in the Gelo Porsche now leading. In a surprising second was another recognised wet-weather master, Hans-Joachim Stuck, in the IMSA BMW M1 that had started 23rd on the grid, benefiting from its superior fuel-economy. Wollek's excellent car control in the atrocious conditions allowed the team to keep the lead for over three hours.

An early casualty was Alain De Cadenet. The engine had been running rough and a number of pitstops left him in 37th after an hour. He ground to a halt at Mulsanne corner with electrical issues, but was able to ring his crew from the signalling pits there to get help to make repairs. De Cadenet's erstwhile team-mate, Chris Craft, had lost second and third gear early on, with the Dome losing several hours in gearbox repairs and leaving them running a distant last on track. The works Lancia team had a miserable race and both had been retired in less than two hours with engine problems, putting all the pressure on the Jolly Club car to be able to get them points in the World Championship. In such atrocious weather, the number of accidents was surprisingly low. The worst incident was on the seventh lap, when Mike Sherwin crashed the third Barbour 935 into Yves Courage's spinning Chevron at Tertre Rouge and was launched over it before thudding on its nose into the guardrail. Spartaco Dini slid the Scuderia Bellancauto Ferrari off at Maison Blanche after 90 minutes. Soon after, Charles Mendez spun off at Arnage hitting the barriers and damaging the rear suspension. Limping back, track marshals stopped him at the Ford Chicanes, but he could not restart the car to complete the last hundred metres to the pits.

By 7pm, after 3 hours, the track was drying and the sun was out. After Fitzpatrick pitted from the lead to hand over to Redman, Wollek's Gelo Porsche was leading from Stuck and Redman, all having done 39 laps. Jacky Ickx had been driving within himself, keeping out of trouble with the hybrid Porsche but still on the lead lap in fourth. The next four were a lap back: Ikuzawa (Kremer 935), Pescarolo (Rondeau), Fréquelin (WM) and Ongais (Kremer 935) while Quester (BMW) and Rondeau rounded out the top-10 completing 37 laps. Stuck's challenge came to an end at 7.15pm when he collided with an intransigent Harald Grohs, who refused to have his Vegla 935, several laps down, be lapped again. Blocking Stuck several times from passing, the two collided and it was the BMW that came off worse: with 20 minutes lost replacing the nose, radiator and windscreen, they came out in 23rd. The BMW-France M1, running ninth, also lost a lot of time when Le Mans Racing School lead-driver Marcel Mignot spun at Tertre Rouge, damaging the front end and needing the car's steering rack changed. Joest relieved Ickx, and now able to speed up, he picked off those in front to take the lead at 7.50pm.

At the four-hour mark, the leaders were an intriguing mix of classes – with Joest (G6) just ahead of the Barbour (IMSA) and Gelo (G5) 935s and Rondeau (G6) all having done 59 laps. After its terrible start, the Toj had been leading the 2-litre class at the 2-hour mark. Delayed by spark-plug problems, the ignition failed on the Toj soon after midnight. Meanwhile the lead had been picked up by the Primagaz Lola. The Osella had been stymied by wet electrics early on, but strong driving by Lombardi and Thatcher had them back up to third-in-class by the third hour.

Soon after 9pm Stommelen, running sixth, pitted the Kremer Porsche with fuel pressure issues. Fitting new fuel pumps dropped them well down to 28th. They never recovered, retiring before dawn with a blown engine. Ted Field's Kremer did not last much longer – having got up to fifth, they also retired (around 10pm) with engine failure. Then at 9.30pm, history repeated itself with Ickx coming to a stop between Indianapolis and Arnage with a snapped drivebelt. This time however, he had a spare on-board and was able to fit it, to get back to the pits in a quarter of an hour. Not long after that, a similar issue befell Wollek, now back in the Gelo Porsche in fourth place, losing the fuel-injection belt as he passed the pits. Parked at the Dunlop curve, he fitted the spare taking fourteen minutes for almost a full lap to get back to the mechanics for repairs, resuming down in 17th.

This had moved the pole-sitting Rondeau into the lead for the first time. As night was setting in after six hours, they had a small margin over Fitzpatrick's Barbour 935 in second (both 84 laps). The Rondeau/Jaussaud car was now in third and the Gelo Porsche in fourth (83 laps). Two laps further back was Danny Ongais in the Kremer 935. Ickx had come back into the race in sixth and driving hard back through the field, including setting the fastest lap of the race.

=== Night ===
By 11pm the WM of Dorchy/Fréquelin was running fourth, overtaking the 935s ahead of it. But then, after providing exhilarating coverage to the spectators, they lost time to have the cameras removed for the night-time running. All three WMs were running well, on or about the top-10 until they all stopped for brake changes over the next hour. In the 2-litre classes, the remaining Lancia of the Jolly Club team (that had been 10th after the first hour) had drifted back and then spent an hour having a gearbox rebuild. The Primagaz Lola now had a 5-lap cushion over the Dorset Racing Lola and the Osella. The good run of the Field/Ongais/Lafosse 935 came to an end with a burnt piston, a common failing of the Porsche turbo-powered engines.

Just before midnight, the leading Rondeau started having engine problems and lost the lead to the Barbour Porsche. Soon after, Pescarolo parked up on the Mulsanne Straight, retiring with a blown head gasket. After 9 hours Barbour, Rondeau and Ickx were all on the same lap (126). The stationery Pescarolo was still classified fourth. After their tribulations at the start of the race, the car of De Cadenet and Migault had run perfectly and charged through the field from 39th to now be fifth (123), a lap ahead of the Barbour Porsche of Rahal/Garretson/Moffat and the third Rondeau. Eighth (121) was the BMW of Stuck/Bürger/Lacaud having recovered from the earlier collision, two windscreen replacements and a crankshaft repair. The Whittington brothers, ninth, had been as high as sixth but were now in the pits with differential issues. Rounding out the top-10 was the first of the works Porsche 924s (the "German" one of Barth/Schurti). However, within the hour, Garretson had to park the Barbour 935 with piston failure and Schurti was in the pits for a new radiator after hitting an over-adventurous hare. With the Primagaz Lola having engine issues, the pursuing DRA car was able to make up the laps and took the class-lead around 2am. However, in the next hour, Nick Mason spun the car at the Ford Chicane when a hydraulic line split. Unable to restart the car he was finally able to creep back to the pits on the starter motor, taking 45 minutes to cover 200 metres.

When the Barbour 935 then suffered a puncture, this allowed Ickx to resume the lead before 3am with the Rondeau a lap behind. By half-time, very fast driving by Ickx (170) had built a solid lead over the Rondeau (169) with the Barbour Porsche now a further two laps behind (167). The field was starting to string out, with other Rondeau now fourth (165) ahead of the De Cadenet (164) and the Gelo Porsche (163). Seventh was the French BMW in a tight race with the other Kremer 935, Bell/Holbert in the Porsche 924 and the first of the WMs (all 160). As the night-driving drew to a close, more 935s were starting to fall victim to gasket and piston issues, including the second Barbour car and the pink Kremer car. The Charles Ivey team lost a row of cylinders, and soon after 6am the Gelo Porsche of Wollek/Kelleners fell out of sixth when it was put out of the race with a broken head gasket.

=== Morning ===
The order at the top remained the same as dawn arrived, although the Rondeau had made up time on the Joest Porsche. On the same lap now, the lead changed several times according to pit stops. An errant stone getting wedged in the engine undertray delayed the third-placed Barbour Porsche, bringing it into the clutches of the second Rondeau and the De Cadenet. The three works Porsche 924s were now in the top-10, mixing it with the Saulnier/Bousquet/Morin WM. An overcast dawn led to a drizzly morning. At 8.30am Migault brought in the De Cadenet with the rear end loose. The cross-member supporting the engine had broken. All the night's hard work was undone with repairs taking 55 minutes. The last Kremer car, of Lapeyre/Verney/Trintignant, was retired at 9am with a broken gearbox while running in ninth. Also delayed were two of the works Porsches, suffering fuel issues, needing to have their engines adjusted to only run on three cylinders and running around forty seconds off their regular lap times.

Jaussaud stopped to change their brakes at 9am as well, costing two laps. Then just before 10am, Joest brought the leading car into the pits without its fifth gear. The stop cost 25 minutes. Jaussaud now had a five-lap lead and eased off to conserve the car.

At 11.20am, Jean-Louis Bousquet, running fifth in the leading WM, crashed at the Ford chicane after suffering suspension failure. The sister car of Dorchy/Fréquelin inherited their place while the healthy works Porsche was sixth. After noon the fourth-placed Barbour Porsche was in the pits with a faulty head gasket and burnt out piston. The crew isolated the piston and sent it back out on five.

=== Finish and post-race ===
At 1.10pm a sudden squall swept across part of the track. The first to arrive at the saturated Dunlop Curve was the leading Rondeau, which aquaplaned off the track, kissing the fences and spinning. They were soon followed by the Joest Porsche, having made back one lap they were about to retrieve a second when Joest also skated off the track, thumping the barriers and just missing the Rondeau. Fortunately, both were able to get going again. Another victim was the Primagaz Lola leading the 2-litres. Yver pirouetted twice without hitting anything and was also able to continue. But he had damaged the engine and took twelve minutes to complete the lap. After a pit stop, he only got as far as Mulsanne before stopping again after leading the class for the last eleven hours. John Paul in the JLP Porsche clouted the barrier on his off-track excursion, that cost half an hour to repair, while the WMs, in the confusion, stopped three times each to change tyres.

Jaussaud got back in the Rondeau with ninety minutes to go, with a 2-lap lead over Ickx in the chasing Porsche. As the race approached its finale Ickx had got back onto the same lap as the leader with 40 minutes to go. Then five minutes later, another heavy shower arrived and Ickx immediately dived for the pits to change to wet tyres, hoping to catch a march on the leader. Jaussaud was also told to pit, but coming out of the chicanes changed his mind and pulled out of the pit entrance, deciding to risk staying on his slick tyres. He made the right decision – the rain was brief, he stayed out of trouble and was able to pull away as the wind dried the track in the last half-hour. Ickx on the other hand had to drive conservatively to save his tyres and ended up finishing two laps behind the Rondeau.

It was important victory for the French team - Jaussaud's second victory in a French car but Jean Rondeau became the first driver/constructor to win Le Mans. The sister-car of Spice and the Martin frères came in third, nine laps behind their team-mates and winning the GTP class from the Dorchy/Fréquelin WM eleven laps further back. In the closing laps they had managed to overtake the crippled Barbour Porsche that was running on five cylinders. Despite its ailing engine, Dick Barbour won back-to-back class victories in the IMSA class. Five laps back, the JLP Porsche had been fighting for second-in-class with the Pozzi Ferrari of Dieudonné/Xhenceval/Regout for virtually the entire second half of the race, and in the end beat it home by less than a kilometre.

The new Porsches had a satisfactory race and all three finished. Aside from repairs to the front after hitting an errant rabbit, the German-crewed car had a trouble-free run to finish sixth. After running in the top-10 in the early morning, the other two cars made it home with their engine issues, eventually finishing 12th and 13th. Despite their hour-long stop earlier in the morning, the persistence of the De Cadenet team paid off with a well-deserved seventh, holding off the challenge of the Vegla Porsche.

The 2-litre Group 6 class was a great result for the ROC-Yakko team with a 1-2 victory. Class winner was their Chevron that had come in as a reserve entry, and that after losing 40 minutes at the very start and resuming at the back of the field, had got to the front of the class with three hours to go as all others fell over. The unexpected winner in the Group 4 GT class was Thierry Perrier's ethanol-Porsche which, although not fast, had run like clockwork. They inherited the lead when the Alméras brothers' Porsche crashed at the Dunlop curve with less than three hours to go.

Last car home was the Dome, the long-suffering team having spent over four hours working on the car in the pits. This included three hours at the start of the race getting the gearbox rebuilt. Thereafter it ran at the back of the field, but kept going and finished 92 laps (over 650 km) behind the winners.

As always, reliability and time in the pits had decided the race, with the Porsche's hour-long delay for another broken belt and gearbox proving the difference. The GTP-winning Rondeau, with its trouble-free run, spent less than 45 minutes in the pits – the best of any of the cars and a reflection of the new fuelling regulations.

Despite his immense pride, Rondeau's triumph had been costly. Aside from having a scheduled kidney operation four days after the race, he stated that preparing the three cars had cost FF1.8 million for his workforce of eight. Likewise, Gérard Welter said the WM sponsorship from Esso was less than the cost of a new Porsche 935.

At the end of the race, Ickx announced that it would be his last Le Mans. A month later the Martin brothers took their Ford Capri to repeat their victory at Spa. John Paul had won the inaugural World Endurance Driver Challenge in 1978, and won the title again this year after 2nd places at Daytona, Mosport and a victory at Riverside. In a sad postscript to the season after his pre-race accident, Peter Gregg, a 4-time Daytona winner, fell into depression and committed suicide in December.

== Official results ==
=== Finishers ===
Results taken from Quentin Spurring's book, officially licensed by the ACO
Class winners are in Bold text.

Pos	Class	No.	Team	Drivers	Chassis	Engine	Tyre	Laps
1	**Gr.6**; **S 3.0**	**16**	**(France) Jean Rondeau**	**(France) Jean Rondeau** **(France) Jean-Pierre Jaussaud**	Rondeau M379B	Cosworth DFV 3.0 L V8	G	339
2	Gr.6; S 3.0	9	(West Germany) Equipe Liqui Moly - Martini Racing	(Belgium) Jacky Ickx (West Germany) Reinhold Joest	Porsche 908/J80	Porsche 911/78 2.1L F6 twin-turbo	D	337
3	**LM GTP**	17	**(France) Jean Rondeau**	**(United Kingdom) Gordon Spice** **(Belgium) Philippe Martin** **(Belgium) Jean-Michel Martin**	Rondeau M379B	Cosworth DFV 3.0 L V8	G	330
4	LM GTP	5	(France) WM Esso	(France) Guy Fréquelin (France) Roger Dorchy	WM P79/80	Peugeot PRV ZNS4 2.7L; V6 twin-turbo	M	319
5	**IMSA**	**70**	**(United States) Dick Barbour Racing**	**(United Kingdom) John Fitzpatrick** **(United Kingdom) Brian Redman** **(United States) Dick Barbour**	Porsche 935 K3/80	Porsche 930/72 3.2L F6 turbo	G	318
6	LM GTP	4	(West Germany) Porsche System	(West Germany) Jürgen Barth (Liechtenstein) Manfred Schurti	Porsche 924 Carrera GT Turbo	Porsche 2.0 L S4 turbo	D	317
7	Gr.6; S 3.0	8	(United Kingdom) A. de Cadenet (private entrant)	(United Kingdom) Alain de Cadenet (France) François Migault	De Cadenet-Lola LM78	Cosworth DFV 3.0L V8	D	314
8	**Gr.5**; **SP 2.0+**	**49**	**(West Germany) Vegla Racing Team**	**(West Germany) Harald Grohs** **(West Germany) Dieter Schornstein** **(West Germany) Götz von Tschirnhaus**	Porsche 935/77A	Porsche 930 3.0L F6 turbo	D	314
9	IMSA	73	(United States) JLP Racing	(United States) John Paul Sr. (United States) John Paul Jr. (United Kingdom) Guy Edwards	Porsche 935-JLP2	Porsche 930 3.0L F6 turbo	G	313
10	IMSA	76	(France) Charles Pozzi / JMS Racing	(Belgium) Pierre Dieudonné (Belgium) Jean Xhenceval (Belgium) Hervé Regout	Ferrari 512BB/LM	Ferrari 4.9L F12	M	313
11	LM GTP	6	(France) WM Esso	(France) Marcel "Max" Mamers (France) Jean-Daniel Raulet	WM P79/80	Peugeot PRV ZNS4 2.7L; V6 twin-turbo	M	312
12	LM GTP	2	(West Germany) Porsche System	(United Kingdom) Andy Rouse (United Kingdom) Tony Dron	Porsche 924 Carrera GT Turbo	Porsche 2.0 L S4 turbo	D	311
13	LM GTP	3	(West Germany) Porsche System	(United Kingdom) Derek Bell (United States) Al Holbert	Porsche 924 Carrera GT Turbo	Porsche 2.0 L S4 turbo	D	306
14	IMSA	83	BMW-France	(Austria) Dieter Quester (France) Didier Pironi (France) Marcel Mignot	BMW M1	BMW M88 3.5L S6	D	294
15	IMSA	84	(France) D. Lacaud (private entrant) (West Germany) BMW Motorsport GmbH	(France) Dominique Lacaud (West Germany) Hans-Joachim Stuck (West Germany) Hans-Georg Bürger	BMW M1	BMW M88 3.5L S6	D	284
16	**Gr.4**; **GT**	**93**	**(France) T. Perrier** (private entrant)	**(France) Thierry Perrier** **(France) Roger Carmillet**	Porsche 911 SC	Porsche 3.0L F6 turbo (Ethanol)	K	281
17	**Gr.6**; **S 2.0**	**25** (Reserve)	**(France) ROC-Société Yacco**	**(France) Bruno Sotty** **(France) Dominique Laurent** **(France) Philippe Hesnault**	Chevron B36	Simca-ROC 2.0L S4	G	277
18	Gr.6; S 2.0	23	(France) ROC-Société Yacco	(France) Michel Dubois (France) Christian Debias (Switzerland) Florian Vetsch	Lola T298	Simca-ROC 2.0L S4	G	273
19	**Gr.5**; **SP >2.0**	**53**	**(Italy) Jolly Club / Lancia Corse**	**(Italy) Carlo Facetti** **(Italy) Martino Finotto**	Lancia Monte Carlo Turbo	Lancia 1425cc S4 turbo	P	273
20	IMSA	89	(France) H. Poulain (private entrant)	(France) Hervé Poulain (France) Dany Snobeck (France) Pierre Destic	Porsche 934/5	Porsche 3.0L F6 turbo	D	272
21	IMSA	86 (Reserve)	(United States) Z & W Enterprises Inc.	(United States) Pierre Honegger (United States) Mark Hutchins (Venezuela) Ernesto Soto	Mazda RX-7	Mazda 12A 1146cc twin-rotary	G	267
22	Gr.6; S 2.0	29	(United Kingdom) Dorset Racing Associates	(Republic of Ireland) Martin Birrane (United Kingdom) Peter Clark (United Kingdom) Nick Mason	Lola T297/8	Cosworth BDG 2.0L S4	D	264
23	IMSA	78 (Reserve)	(United Kingdom) EMKA Productions (United Kingdom) Rosso Racing	(United Kingdom) Steve O'Rourke (United Kingdom) Richard Down (United Kingdom) Simon Phillips	Ferrari 512BB/LM	Ferrari 4.9L F12	D	263
24	Gr.4; GT	90	(France) G. Bourdillat (private entrant)	(France) Georges Bourdillat (France) Alain-Michel Bernhard (France) Roland Ennequin	Porsche 934	Porsche 3.0L F6 turbo	M	249
25	Gr.6; S 3.0	12	(Japan) Dome Co. Ltd	(United Kingdom) Chris Craft (United Kingdom) Bob Evans	Dome Zero RL80	Cosworth DFV 3.0L V8	D	247

=== Did not finish ===
Pos	Class	No	Team	Drivers	Chassis	Engine	Tyre	Laps	Reason
DNF	LM GTP	7	(France) WM Esso	(France) Serge Saulnier (France) Jean-Louis Bousquet (France) Denis Morin	WM P79/80	Peugeot PRV ZNS4 2.7L; V6 twin-turbo	M	264	Accident (21hr)
DNF	Gr.4; GT	94	(France) Equipe Alméras Frères (private entrant)	(France) Jacques Alméras (France) Jean-Marie Alméras (France) Marianne Hoepfner	Porsche 934	Porsche 3.0L F6 turbo	M	255	Accident (22hr)
DNF	Gr.6; S 2.0	27	(France) M. Elkoubi (private entrant) (France) Primagaz	(France) Pierre Yver (France) Patrick Perrier	Lola T298	BMW M12 2.0L S4	G	251	Engine (23hr)
DNF	IMSA	69	(United States) Racing Associates Inc.	(United States) Bob Akin (United States) Ralph Kent-Cooke (United States) Paul Miller	Porsche 935 K3/79	Porsche 930 3.0L F6 twin-turbo	G	237	Transmission (20hr)
DNF	IMSA	95	(France) BMW Zol-Auto	(France) François Sérvanin (France) Laurent Ferrier (France) Pierre-François Rousselot	BMW M1	BMW M88 3.5L S6	D	237	Engine (20hr)
DNF	Gr.5; SP 2.0+	43	(West Germany) Kremer Racing (West Germany) Team Malardeau	(France) Xavier Lapeyre (France) Jean-Louis Trintignant (France) Anne-Charlotte Verney	Porsche 935-K3/79-80	Porsche 930 3.0L F6 turbo	D	217	Transmission (18hr)
DNF	Gr.5; SP 2.0+	45	(West Germany) Gelo Racing Team	(France) Bob Wollek (West Germany) Helmut Kelleners	Porsche 935-K3/79-80	Porsche 930/80 3.2L F6 twin-turbo	P	191	Engine (15hr)
DNF	Gr.5; SP 2.0+	42	(West Germany) Kremer Racing	(Japan) Tetsu Ikuzawa (West Germany) Rolf Stommelen (West Germany) Axel Plankenhorn	Porsche 935-K3/79-80	Porsche 930/78-1 3.0L F6 twin-turbo	D	167	Engine (14hr)
DNF	Gr.4; GT	80	(Puerto Rico) Diego Febles Racing (private entrant)	(Puerto Rico) Diego Febles (Puerto Rico) Armando Gonzales (Venezuela) Francisco Romero	Porsche 934	Porsche 3.0L F6 turbo	G	164	Accident (15hr)
DNF	Gr.5; SP 2.0+	44	(United Kingdom) Charles Ivey Racing	(United Kingdom) John Cooper (United Kingdom) Peter Lovett (United Kingdom) Dudley Wood	Porsche 935-K3/79	Porsche 930/80 3.0L F6 turbo	D	158	Engine (16hr)
DNF	Gr.6; S 2.0	28	(Italy) Scuderia Torino Corse	(Italy) Lella Lombardi (United Kingdom) Mark Thatcher	Osella PA8	BMW M12 2.0L S4	P	157	Accident (16hr)
DNF	IMSA	85	(United States) Whittington Brothers Racing (United States) Sun System	(United States) Don Whittington (United States) Dale Whittington (United States) Hurley Haywood	Porsche 935-K3/80	Porsche 930 3.0L F6 turbo	G	151	Transmission (13hr)
DNF	Gr.4; GT	91	(France) ASA Cachia	(France) Christian Bussi (France) Bernard Salam (France) Cyril Grandet	Porsche 934	Porsche 3.0L F6 turbo	D	137	Engine (15hr)
DNF	IMSA	71	(United States) Dick Barbour Racing	(United States) Bobby Rahal (United States) Bob Garretson (Canada) Allan Moffat	Porsche 935-K3/79	Porsche 930 3.0L F6 twin-turbo	G	134	Engine (14hr)
DNF	IMSA	77	(France) Charles Pozzi / JMS Racing	(France) Claude Ballot-Léna (France) Jean-Claude Andruet	Ferrari 512BB/LM	Ferrari 4.9L F12	M	129	Electrics (12hr)
DNF	Gr.6; S 3.0	1	(Switzerland) André Chevalley Racing (private entrant)	(Switzerland) André Chevalley (France) Patrick Gaillard (France) François Trisconi	ACR 80	Cosworth DFV 3.0L V8	G	126	Suspension (15hr)
DNF	LM GTX	96	(France) Garage du Bac (private entrant)	(France) Frédéric Alliot (France) Jacques Guérin	BMW M1	BMW M88 3.5L S6	D	125	Accident (13hr)
DNF	Gr.6; S 3.0	15	(France) Jean Rondeau	(France) Henri Pescarolo (France) Jean Ragnotti	Rondeau M379B	Cosworth DFV 3.0L V8	G	124	Engine (10hr)
DNF	Gr.5; SP 2.0+	41	(West Germany) Kremer Racing (West Germany) Team Malardeau	(United States) Ted Field (United States) Danny Ongais (France) Jean-Louis Lafosse	Porsche 935-K3/80	Porsche 930 3.0L F6 twin-turbo	D	89	Engine (8hr)
DNF	Gr.6; S 2.0	22	(France) H. Striebig / BP Racing (private entrant)	(France) Hubert Striebig (France) Michel Pignard (West Germany) Mario Ketterer	ToJ SM-01	BMW M12 2.0L S4	D	79	Electrics (9hr)
DNF	IMSA	75	(France) Charles Pozzi / JMS Racing	(France) Lucien Guitteny (France) Gérard Bleynie (France) Jean-Paul Libert	Ferrari 512BB/LM	Ferrari 4.9L F12	M	47	Accident (7hr)
DNF	IMSA	82	(United Kingdom) March Engines Ltd	(West Germany) Manfred Winkelhock (Belgium) Patrick Nève (West Germany) Michael Korten	BMW-March M1	BMW M88 3.5L S6	D	38	Accident (7hr)
DNF	Gr.5; SP 2.0+	46	(Switzerland) Meccarillos Racing	(Switzerland) Claude Haldi (France) Bernard Béguin (West Germany) Volkert Merl	Porsche 935-K3/80	Porsche 930 2.9L F6 turbo	D	37	Engine (5hr)
DNF	Gr.6; S 2.0	24	(France) ROC-Société Yacco	(France) Marc Sourd (France) Bernard Verdier	Lola T298	Simca-ROC 2.0L S4	G	27	Engine (5hr)
DNF	Gr.5; SP 2.0	52	(Italy) Scuderia Lancia Corse	(Italy) Piercarlo Ghinzani (Italy) Gianfranco Brancatelli (Finland) Markku Alén	Lancia Monte Carlo Turbo	Lancia 1425cc S4 turbo	P	26	Oil pump (4hr)
DNF	IMSA	79	(Italy) Scuderia Supercar Bellancauto	(Italy) Spartaco Dini (Italy) Fabrizio Violati (Italy) Maurizio Micangeli	Ferrari 512BB/LM	Ferrari 4.9L F12	G	10	Accident (2hr)
DNF	IMSA	68	(United States) Racing Associates Inc.	(United States) Charles Mendez (United States) Skeeter McKitterick (Argentina) Leon Walger	Porsche 935-K3/79	Porsche 930/72 3.0L F6 twin-turbo	G	9	Accident (2hr)
DNF	IMSA	72	(United States) Dick Barbour Racing (United States) Wynn's International	(United States) Mike Sherwin (United States) Bob Kirby (United States) Bob Harmon	Porsche 935-K3/79-80	Porsche 930 3.0L F6 twin-turbo	G	7	Accident (2hr)
DNF	Gr.6; S 2.0	20	(France) J.-P. Grand	(France) Jean-Philippe Grand (France) Yves Courage	Chevron B36	BMW M12 2.0L S4	G	6	Accident (2hr)
DNF	Gr.5; SP 2.0	51	(Italy) Scuderia Lancia Corse	(West Germany) Hans Heyer (Italy) Teo Fabi (France) Bernard Darniche	Lancia Monte Carlo Turbo	Lancia 1425cc S4 turbo	P	6	Oil pump (2hr)

=== Did not start ===
Pos	Class	No	Team	Drivers	Chassis	Engine	Tyre	Reason
DNQ	Gr.6; S 3.0	10	(United Kingdom) I. Bracey (private entrant)	(United Kingdom) Tiff Needell (United Kingdom) Tony Trimmer	Ibec P6	Cosworth DFV 3.0L V8	M&H	Did not qualify
DNQ	Gr.6; S 3.0	11	(United Kingdom) N. Faure (private entrant)	(United Kingdom) Nick Faure (United Kingdom) Richard Jones (Belgium) Bernard de Dryver	De Cadenet-Lola LM76	Cosworth DFV 3.0L V8	M&H	Did not qualify
DNQ	Gr.6; S 2.0	21	(Switzerland) Racing Fans (Canada) Walter Wolf Racing	(Switzerland) Marc Frischknecht (Switzerland) Sandro Plastina (Switzerland) Mario Luini	Cheetah G-601	Cosworth BDG 2.0L S4	**G**	Did not qualify
DNQ	Gr.6; S 2.0	26	(France) P. Galupeau (private entrant)	(France) Michel Lateste (France) Patrice Lenormand (France) Jacques Terrien	Lola T298	BMW M12 2.0L S4	**G**	Did not qualify
DNQ	Gr.6; S 2.0	30	(France) J.-M. Lemerle (private entrant)	(France) Jean-Marie Lemerle (France) Jean-Pierre Malcher (Morocco) Max Cohen-Olivar	Lola T298	Simca-ROC 2.0L S4	**G**	Engine
DNQ	Gr.5; SP 2.0+	40	(United Kingdom) Janspeed (United Kingdom) ADA Engineering (United Kingdom) TR Register	(United Kingdom) John Sheldon (United Kingdom) Ian Harrower (United Kingdom) John Brindley	Triumph TR8 Turbo	Rover 3.6L V8 turbo	**D**	Did not qualify
DNS	IMSA	74	(United States) North American Racing Team	(United States) Preston Henn (France) Jean-Pierre Delaunay	Ferrari 512BB/LM	Ferrari 4.9L F12	**G**	Engine failure
DNQ	IMSA	81	(Japan) Alpha Cubic Racing	(Japan) Nobuhide Tachi (Japan) Fumiyaso Sato	Toyota Celica Turbo	Toyota 2.8L S4 turbo	**D**	Gearbox
DNQ	IMSA	87	(Canada) All Canadian Racing	(Canada) Maurice "Mo" Carter (Canada) Murray Edwards (Canada) Dick Valentine	Chevrolet Camaro	Chevrolet 7.0L V8	**G**	Did not qualify
DNQ	IMSA	88	(Canada) D. Rowe (private entrant)	(Canada) Douglas Rowe (Canada) Bill Adam (Canada) Jacques Bienvenue	Chevrolet Corvette	Chevrolet 7.0L V8	**G**	Did not qualify
DNA	LM GTP	14	(United Kingdom) Simon Phillips Racing (private entrant)	(United Kingdom) Simon Phillips (United Kingdom) David Preece (United Kingdom) Richard Jenvey	DP Aston Martin LM	Aston Martin 5.3L V8		Did not arrive
DNA	IMSA	86	(France) H. Poulain (private entrant)		BMW M1	BMW M88 3.5L S6		Did not arrive

=== Class winners ===
Class	Winning car	Winning drivers
Group 6 S Sports 3-litre	#16 Rondeau M379B	Rondeau / Jaussaud *
Group 6 S Sports 2-litre	#25 Chevron B36	Sotty / Laurent / Hesnault *
Group 5 SP Special Production over 2-litre	#49 Porsche 935-77A	Grohs / Schornstein / von Tschirnhaus *
Group 5 SP Special Production up to 2-litre	#53 Lancia Monte Carlo Turbo	Facetti / Finotto *
Group 4 GTS Special GT	#93 Porsche 911 SC	Perrier / Carmillet
GTP Le Mans GT Prototype	#17 Rondeau M379B	Spice / P. Martin / J.-M. Martin *
GTX Le Mans GT Experimental	no finishers	
IMSA	#70 Porsche 935-K3/80	Barbour / Fitzpatrick / Redman *

- Note: setting a new class distance record.

=== Index of Energy Efficiency ===
Pos	Class	No	Team	Drivers	Chassis	Score
1	Gr.6; S 3.0	16	(France) Jean Rondeau	(France) Jean Rondeau (France) Jean-Pierre Jaussaud	Rondeau M379B	0.701
2	LM GTP	2	(West Germany) Porsche System	(United Kingdom) Andy Rouse (United Kingdom) Tony Dron	Porsche 924 Carrera GT Turbo	0.666
3	LM GTP	17	(France) Jean Rondeau	(United Kingdom) Gordon Spice (Belgium) Philippe Martin (Belgium) Jean-Michel Martin	Rondeau M379B	0.642
4	LM GTP	6	(France) WM Esso	(France) Marcel Mamers (France) Jean-Daniel Raulet	WM P79/80	0.607
5	LM GTP	4	(West Germany) Porsche System	(West Germany) Jürgen Barth (Liechtenstein) Manfred Schurti	Porsche 924 Carrera GT Turbo	0.589
6	Gr.6; S 3.0	9	(West Germany) Equipe Liqui Moly - Martini Racing	(Belgium) Jacky Ickx (West Germany) Reinhold Joest	Porsche 908/J80	0.588
7	Gr.6; S 3.0	8	(United Kingdom) A. de Cadenet (private entrant)	(United Kingdom) Alain de Cadenet (France) François Migault	De Cadenet-Lola LM78	0.565
8	LM GTP	3	(West Germany) Porsche System	(United Kingdom) Derek Bell (United States) Al Holbert	Porsche 924 Carrera GT Turbo	0.556
9	Gr.6; S 2.0	29	(United Kingdom) Dorset Racing Associates	(Republic of Ireland) Martin Birrane (United Kingdom) Peter Clark (United Kingdom) Nick Mason	Lola T297/8	0.554
10	Gr.6; S 2.0	25 (Reserve)	(France) ROC-Société Yacco	(France) Bruno Sotty (France) Dominique Laurent (France) Philippe Hesnault	Chevron B36	0.519

- Note: Only the top ten positions are included in this set of standings.

=== Statistics ===
Taken from Quentin Spurring's book, officially licensed by the ACO

- Fastest lap in practice –J. Fitzpatrick, #70 Porsche 935-K3– 3:40.0secs; 222.18 km/h (138.06 mph)
- Pole Position –H. Pescarolo, #15 Rondeau M379B– averaged lap-time 3:47.9secs
- Fastest lap –J. Ickx, #9 Porsche 908/J80 – 3:40.6secs; 222.37 km/h (138.17 mph)
- Winning distance – 4,608.02 km (2,863.29 mi)
- Winner's average speed – 191.90 km/h (119.24 mph)
- Attendance – ?

Citations
