= 1978 24 Hours of Le Mans =

46th 24 Hours of Le Mans endurance race

Previous: 1977	Next: 1979
Index: Races | Winners

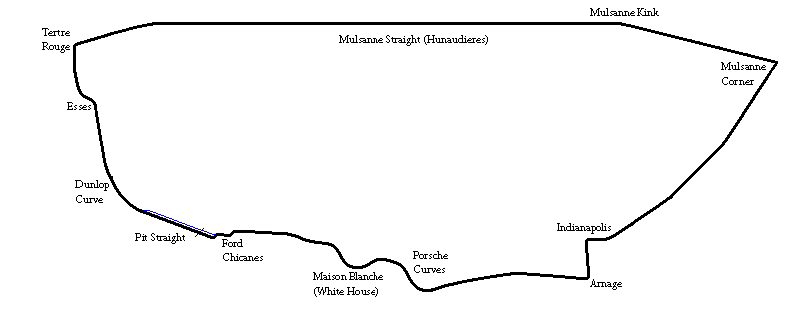
Le Mans in 1978

The 1978 24 Hours of Le Mans was the 46th Grand Prix of Endurance, and took place on 10 and 11 June 1978. In many ways it was a continuation of the race from the year before – the two main protagonists would be the very evenly-matched works teams of Alpine-Renault and Porsche, with four cars each. The race was not valid (did not count points) for any championship.

This time it was the Porsche team that had reliability issues – on only the second lap of the race two of their cars were in the pits. Renault soon established a solid hold of the top three positions. Like the year before, after the Ickx /Pescarolo car had early problems, Ickx was transferred to the second Porsche of Barth/Wollek. Once again he set about driving back through the field during the night, getting up to second by midnight behind the Jabouille/Depailler car. But a loss of fifth gear cost them half an hour to repair it. When the lead Renault Alpine A443 stopped on the circuit with a jammed gearbox, there was a sense of déjà vu for the French team. The sister Renault Alpine A442B of Jean-Pierre Jaussaud and Didier Pironi inherited the lead, with a 7-lap margin over the Porsches. Although the second-placed Porsche pulled back two of those laps, this time Renault would not be denied, and Pironi took the flag for a popular local victory with a record race-distance.

Porsche were second and third, the remaining running Renault fourth with the Porsche 935s of customer teams in the next four places. The race also saw several high-speed crashes on the Mulsanne straight, but only one driver was seriously injured.

== Regulations ==
With the predictable demise of the FIA Championship for Group 6 (World Championship for Sports Cars), Le Mans was left as the only significant race that combined Group 6 and Group 5 racecars. No changes were made to the race regulations.

This year, the IMSA GT Championship added the Le Mans GTX class to the incumbent GTO and GTU classes. This, in turn, meant the Automobile Club de l'Ouest (ACO) could merge the IMSA and GTX into a single class. The IMSA regulations allowed a lower minimum weight and wider rear wheels than Group 5. IMSA also inaugurated the World Challenge for Endurance Drivers. Not sanctioned by the FIA, it was a series that linked American races at Daytona, Sebring and Talladega with Le Mans and the Nürburgring. Finally, the Daytona-Le Mans Trophy was repeated.

== Entries ==
The ACO received only 70 applications, the smallest number in a decade with 60 chosen for qualification with a further 7 kept on reserve. Once again, the only manufacturer works teams were from Porsche and Renault, bolstered by entries from small-scale racing specialists Mirage, Osella and WM.

Class	Large-engines >2.0L classes	Medium-engines < 2.0L classes	Turbo engines
Group 6 S Sports	14 / 12	15 / 14	9 / 0
Group 5 SP Special Production	9 / 8	-	8
Group 4 GTS Special GT	10 / 7	-	6
GTP Le Mans GT Prototype	6 / 5	-	2
IMSA GTX IMSA/Le Mans GT Experimental	13 / 9	-	2
Total Entries	52 / 41	15 / 14	27

- Note: The first number is the number of arrivals, the second the number who started.

=== Group 6 and GTP ===
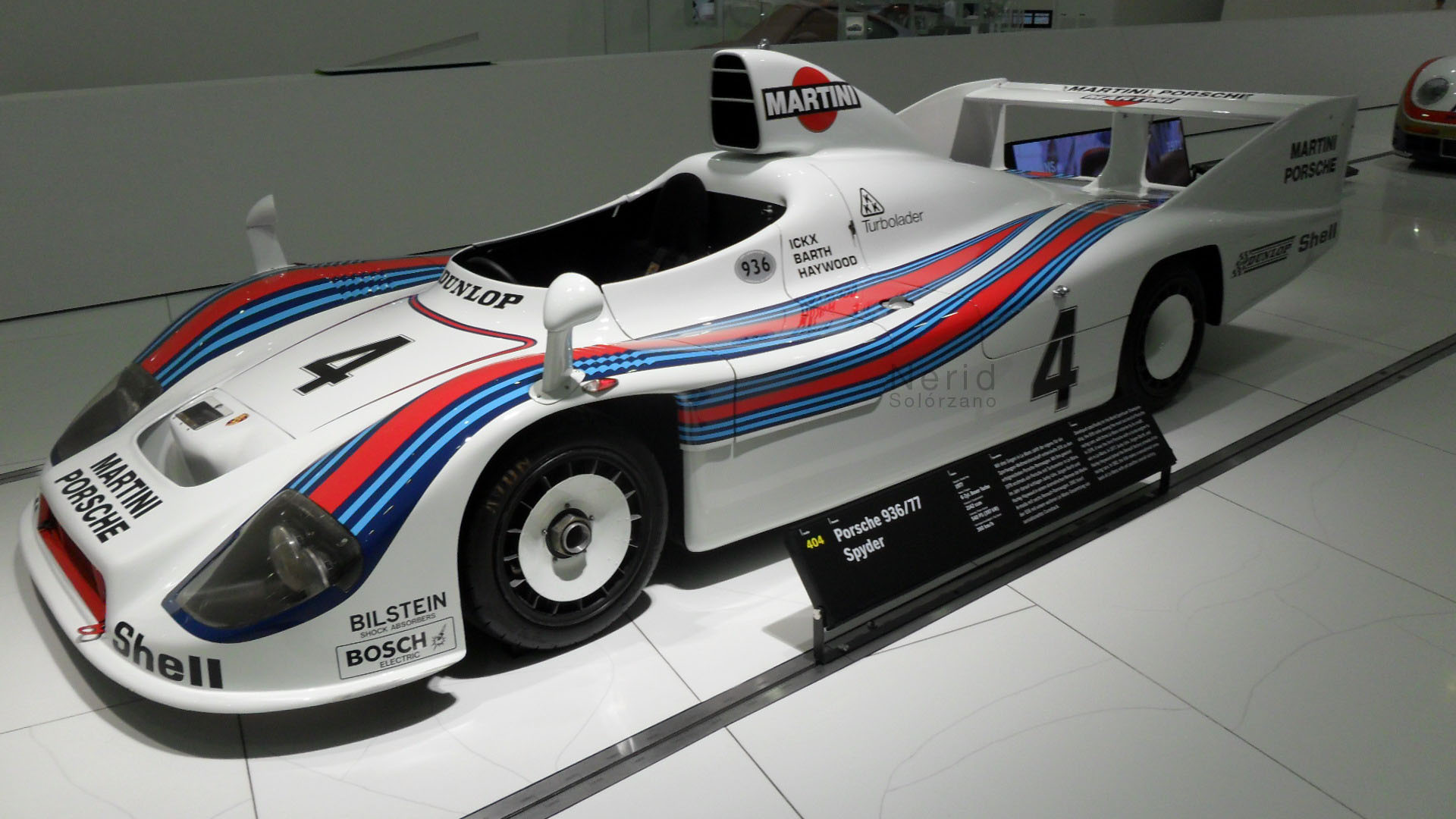
Porsche 936-77

Defending winners, the Martini-Porsche works team, brought back the 936 for its only race of the season. The 2140cc engine with twin KKK (Kühnle, Kopp & Kausch) turbos had been enhanced with quads-cams and at 1.4bar of turbo boost now put out 580 bhp. Wound up to 1.7bar, it was a bit slower at top speed 345 kp/h (215 mph) but overall, with new aerodynamics, much faster around a complete lap. The extra engine power meant higher running temperatures and for the first time, Porsche had water-cooling, combined with its regular air-cooling. The cars were also fitted with the same gearboxes the Can-Am Porsche 917s had used to handle the great engine power. Once again, the endurance experts Jacky Ickx and Henri Pescarolo were paired up, and given the new car. Jürgen Barth had a new co-driver in Bob Wollek, driving the car that failed to finish last year fitted with the new engine. For Wollek, it was his first drive with the works team, after fulfilling a prior commitment with Kremer the year before. Americans Hurley Haywood and Peter Gregg were given the winning car from 1976 and '77, still fitted with the twin-cam, single-turbo engine. Jochen Mass and Reinhold Joest were designated as reserve drivers.

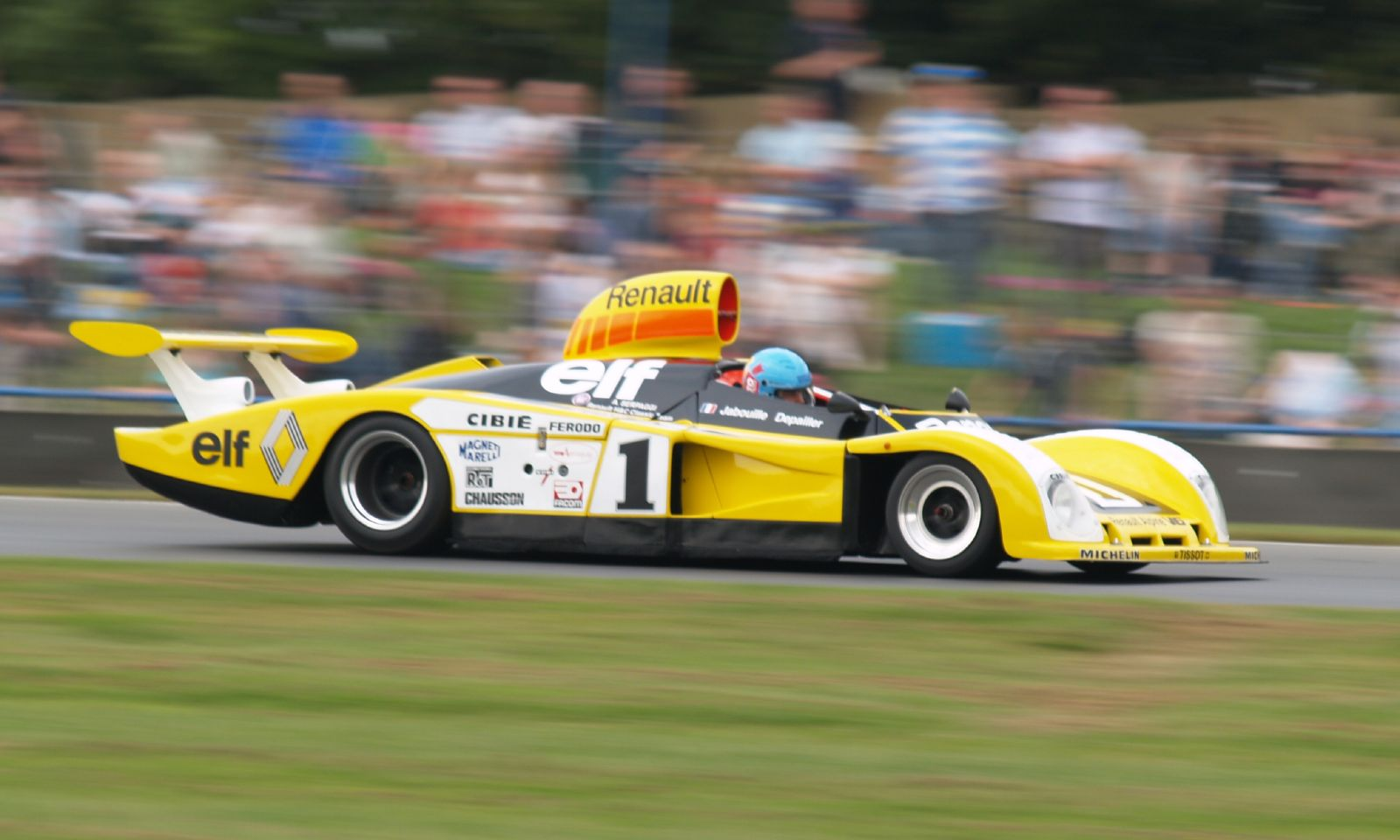
Renault Alpine A443

After a disastrous showing the previous year, Renault Alpine did extensive work on the 2.0-litre twin-turbo engines, making over thirty modifications. The chassis also got scrutiny, with side-skirts and a Perspex bubble-canopy trialled. They did unprecedented testing, covering over 10,000 miles (16,000 km) at Circuit Paul Ricard and Istres airfield. Two short-tail chassis from the last season were given the new engine (A442A), while another was given a longer chassis (A442B). Finally, a brand-new chassis (only unveiled a month before) was built (A443) that had a 15cm longer wheelbase and was broader to carry wider wheels.The bigger 2138cc engine with a single turbo put out slightly more power (520 vs 500 bhp) but could reach 360 kp/h (225 mph) on the Hunaudières straight, fully 25 kp/h faster than the Porsche. Once again, the cream of French Grand Prix talent was brought in: Jean-Pierre Jabouille/Patrick Depailler shared the new car, Jean-Pierre Jaussaud/Didier Pironi had the A442B. The older cars were driven by rally specialists Jean Ragnotti, Guy Fréquelin with José Dolhem and Jean-Pierre Jarier with Le Mans veteran Derek Bell. Patrick Tambay had been slated to race with Jabouille, but his burned foot had not healed sufficiently.

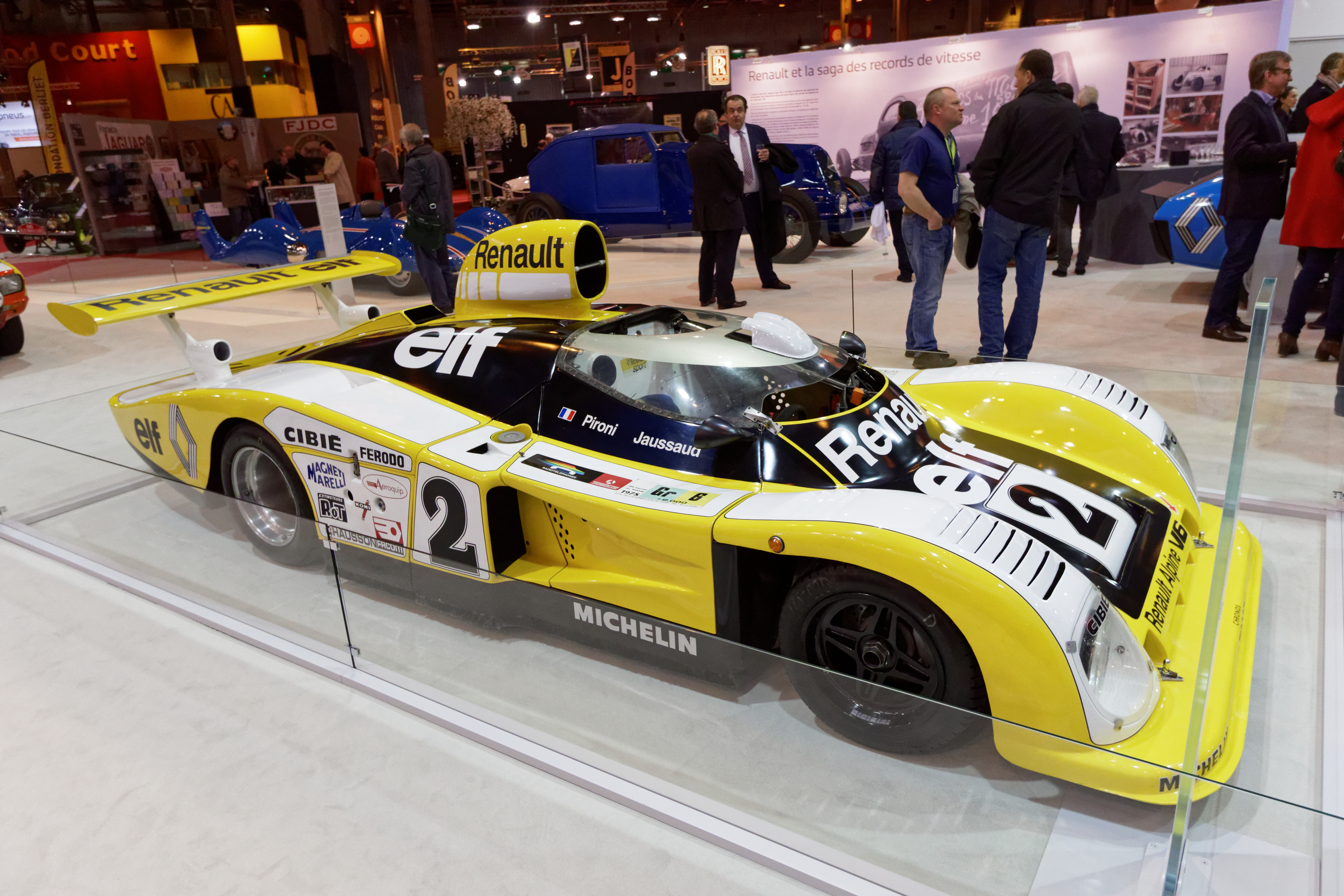
Renault Alpine A442B, with canopy

Mirage engineer John Horsman further developed the M8 to the M9. Keeping the 490 bhp Renault turbo engine, the new chassis was lower and narrower, with a long tail. The revised gearing was able to be tested on the new Interstate 10 section outside of Phoenix before it opened, where team driver Vern Schuppan was able get the car up to 335 kp/h. Two cars were entered: Schuppan had Formula 1 driver Jacques Laffite as co-driver, while Sam Posey and Michel Leclère once again shared the second car.

Alain de Cadenet brought his next iteration based on the Lola T380, designed by Len Bailey (who had previously worked with John Wyer). The LM78 was longer, and faster: with the 460 bhp Cosworth DFV engine, De Cadenet's regular co-driver Chris Craft was able to make 345 kp/h (215 mph) on the back straight. A true privateer effort, as de Cadenet got virtually had no sponsorship. He even sold most of his valuable stamp collection to raise money. Last year's model had been sold to privateer Pete Lovett, while the earlier model returned with Simon Phillips. A new entrant this year was the Ibec, for the Ian Bracey Engineering Company. The Ibec P6 was designed by Harvey Postlethwaite, currently involved with the Hesketh Formula 1 team and the chassis layout was based on the Hesketh 308. But the focus on that meant the Group 6 car fell behind schedule so Bracey took the car to the Lyncar plant to assemble. Drivers Ian Grob and Guy Edwards got their first drive of the car in testing less than a fortnight before the race.

After the withdrawal of the sponsorship money of Inaltéra, Le Mans local Jean Rondeau, despite keeping the design plans, had been forced to sell his cars and start building his designs again. He toyed with a 6-wheeler idea inspired by the Tyrrell P34. Assisted with funding from the city and local region his new car, the M378, was narrower, longer and lighter than the previous model. Testing on the Bugatti Circuit improved the aerodynamics. His co-drivers were rally driver Bernard Darniche and Jacky Haran. One of the Inaltéra bought by the Swiss concern was entered in GTP by André Chevalley. Welter Racing had a new design in the GTP class. The P78 had a longer, more aerodynamic shell. It kept the Peugeot 2.7-litre V6 engine with a KKK turbo and, after improvements, now put out 440 bhp. It would be driven by Debias/Sourd/Mathiot. The team also had last year's P77 model with its same turbo engine (Raulet/Mamers and the older P76. Driven by Bob Neyrat's squad of female racers Christine Dacremont/Marianne Hoepfner, it had a bigger 2.85-litre Peugeot non-turbo engine. The other GTP entry was the return of Bernard Decure's modified Alpine A310.

=== Group 6 (2-litre) ===
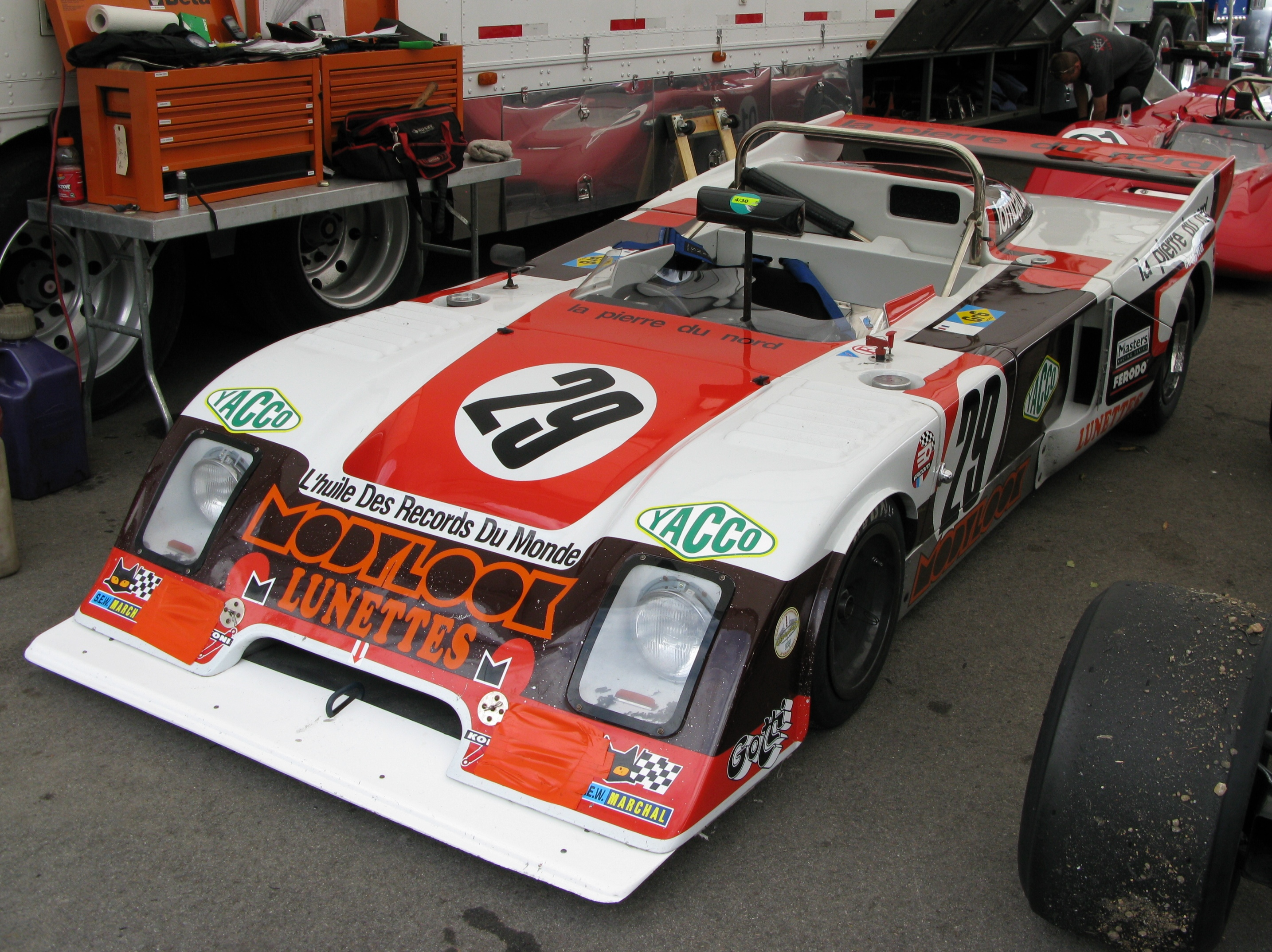
Chevron B36 of the Société ROC team

This year, the biggest class was the 2-litre category with fifteen entries. The class showed a good variety of chassis combined by different engines. The French engine-builder team, Société ROC, had three of the B36 Chevrons. This was the last model of Chevron produced when company founder Derek Bennett was killed in a hang-gliding accident. The Simca-ROC engine was also seen in two Lola. Two types of Cosworth engine powered the other five Lolas, as well as Charles Graemiger's Cheetah. With the demise of the World Group 6 Championship, the European Sportscar Championship was revived and Osella supplied a number of customer cars. Ted Toleman brought one of the Osella-BMWs to Le Mans, co-entered by BMW's British division, with a strong driver lineup of Tom Walkinshaw, Dieter Quester and his Formula 2 team driver Rad Dougall. Once again the small Sauber team was back with the C5, powered by a BMW engine. This year Swiss Formula 2 driver Marc Surer joined the regular drivers Eugen Strähl and Harry Blumer.

=== Group 5 and IMSA GTX ===
With the Porsche works team not contesting the World Championship, it devolved to a duel between the two German customer teams of Georg Loos (buying the services of the underemployed works pit-crews) and Kremer Racing with their 935s. BMW, with their new M1 model delayed, had to make do with the 2-litre 320i in the junior Division 1 class, that could not compete with the bigger cars. Porsche produced fifteen 935 cars for their customer teams. The 1978 version had twin-turbos and a two-level rear wing to improve downforce.

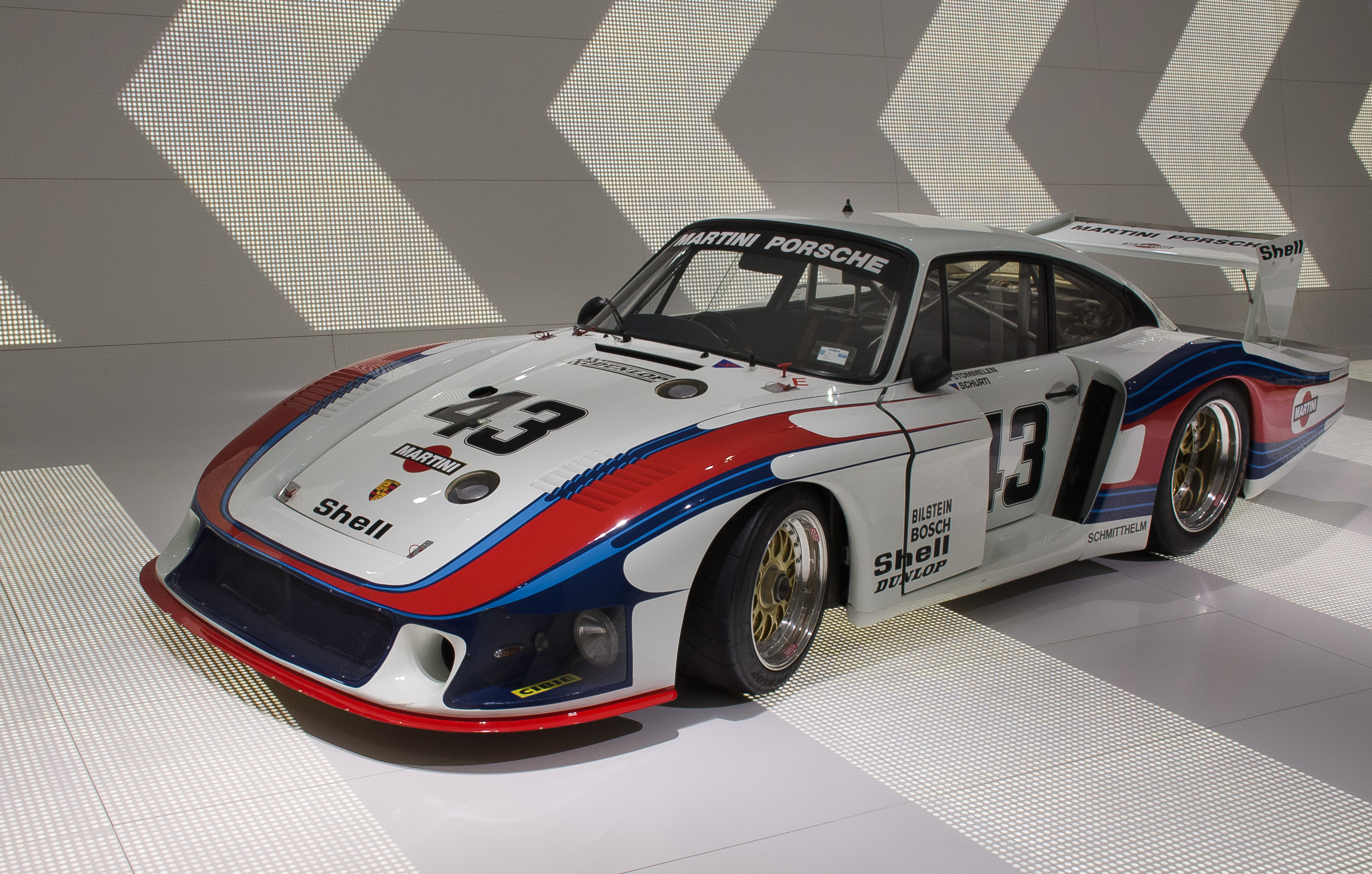
Works-team Porsche 935-78

Meanwhile, the Martini-Porsche works team had developed their Third Generation of the Porsche 935. Nicknamed "Moby Dick", the mighty 935-78 had the most powerful Porsche engine since the 917 Can-Am turbos of the early '70s. The 3.2-litre flat six twin-cam could put out a massive 750 bhp with its twin KKK turbos. Engineer Norbert Singer had ingeniously lowered the car, by lifting the chassis floor, fitting the gearbox and final-drive upside-down and putting the radiators in front of the massive 19" rear wheels. The engine-size bumped it up to the 5-litre class, it had to have a minimum weight of 1025kg (compared to ~800kg for Group 6) and the smaller 120-litre petrol tank for Group 5 cars would demand more fuel-stops in the race (45-minute stints vs 80-minutes for Group 6). Ickx and Mass had won on its only race to date, at Silverstone the month before. As in previous Le Mans, the Group 5 car was handed to Rolf Stommelen and Manfred Schurti.

There were seven other 935s entered by the customer teams. The Kremer brothers had three cars, despite losing their two main drivers (Wollek and Pescarolo) to the works team. Instead they had three relatively inexperienced sets: Gurdjian/Dieter Schornstein/Louis Krages, Raymond/Franey/Wielemans and Americans Busby/Cord/Knoop. Georg Loos only entered one of his two cars, but it had his best driving team of John Fitzpatrick/Toine Hezemans. The other three teams were regular Championship contenders –the French ASA-Cachia team, Mecarillos Racing Team (Switzerland) and Konrad Racing (Germany). A prospective "works" entry from the still independent AMG, which in 1978 was racing a Mercedes 450 SLC as touring car did not eventuate. It was entered in Group 5 with No. 40, did not qualify in that group of competitive 935s, was listed as reserve, and was not called up. Driver Hans Heyer in 1982 presented a much more radical Mercedes 500 SLC for Group C.

The broadening of the IMSA regulations had sent a further fleet of Porsche 935s across the Atlantic to dominate that series. The IMSA-GTX class was well supported with a number of those teams coming across for the first time: Dick Barbour's Hawaiian Tropic team had two cars – driven by Brian Redman/John Paul Snr and Barbour himself, with Bob Garretson/Steve Earle/Bob Akin in the second. The Whittington brothers, Bill and Don, hired Joest's car and got Championship driver Franz Konrad to partner them. There were also two teams running IMSA Porsche 911 Carreras.

After a single Ferrari returned to Le Mans the previous year, there were five entered this year. The 512 BB had recently replaced the 365 GT/4, as the next in the mid-engined series. The 4.9-litre engine was bigger but slightly down on power. Revised rear suspension could accommodate wider tyres. Three cars were specially built by the Ferrari factory to IMSA specifications; two for Charles Pozzi's French team, and one for Luigi Chinetti from NART. A fourth was modified from a road-car by the Ecurie Francorchamps for the regular driver Jean Blaton, who raced under the pseudonym "Beurlys". The fifth car was the older NART 365/4 returning, and run again by the Frenchmen, Lucien Guitteny and François Migault.

Beyond the Porsche vs Ferrari battle in this IMSA class, there was a solitary BMW driven by former European champion Pierre Dieudonné with Alain Cudini. American Brad Friselle, who raced with the Brumos Porsche team in the US, brought a Chevrolet Monza that he had purchased from Michael Keyser (who had raced a similar car in the 1976 race). Its 5.7-litre engine was the biggest one in the race.

=== Group 4 GT ===
The nine entries in the Group 4 class made this the sole preserve of Porsche, all run by small privateer teams. The five Porsche 934s, with the 3-litre turbo, had a distinct power advantage over the three normally-aspirated 3-litre Porsche 911 Carreras. Biggest car in the class was the new 3.3-litre turbo Porsche 911 Turbo (930) of Joël Laplacette.

== Practice and Qualifying ==
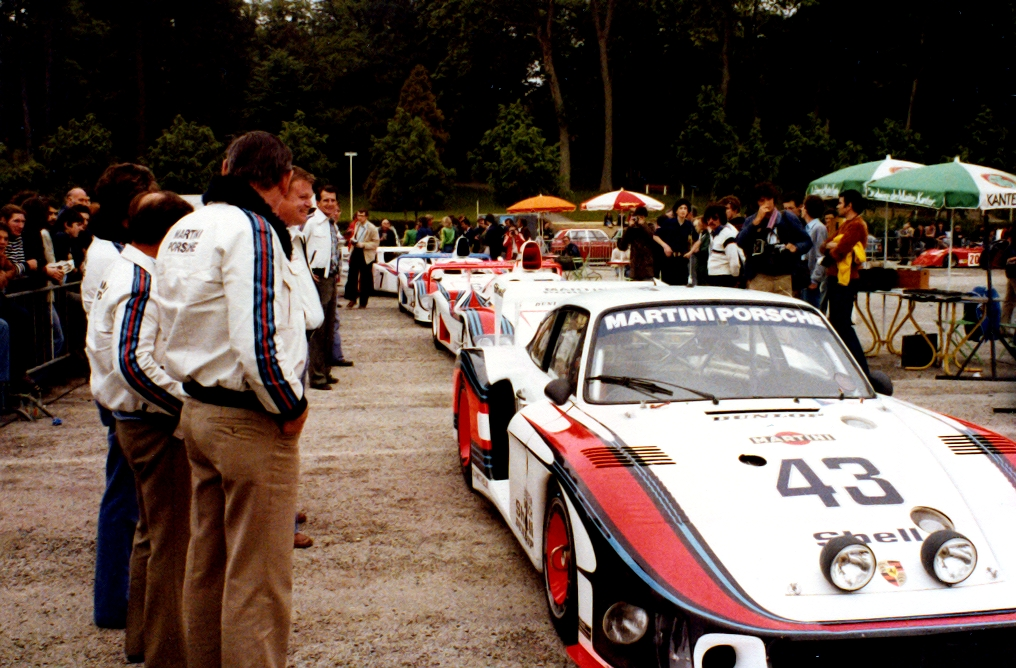
Porsche works team, led by the 935

Rolf Stommelen had never driven the Porsche 935-78 before, but in Wednesday practice he initially held the fastest time. The car was the second-fastest down the Hunaudières Straight, behind the Renaults, reaching 350 kp/h (220 mph). But the next day, in a misguided publicity action, Porsche chose to drive their 935 to the circuit through the streets of Le Mans. The gridlock and slow pace overheated the engine and holed a piston, forcing an unanticipated engine change. The cars of the works Porsche and Renault Alpine teams filled the top eight places on the grid. Jacky Ickx set a sensational new lap record of 3:27.6, beating Arturo Merzario's mark by over a second to put the new Porsche on pole position. Jabouille was almost a second back in the first of the Renaults. Rolf Stommelen got the 935 up to 3rd (3:30.9) well ahead of team-mate Wollek (3:35.2). Ninth was Schuppan's Mirage (3:45.8) ahead of Chris Craft in the De Cadenet. The Mirages had chronic handling issues, which burned up a lot of practice time to resolve. The Gelo 935 was the second Group 5 Porsche, at 11th, over 15 seconds behind Stommelen. The Dick Barbour 935 was fastest of the IMSA class in 16th (3:52.6) just ahead of the Whittington Brothers' 935. It was readily apparent the Ferraris were outpaced, with the leading one, of Charles Ballot-Léna, down in 33rd (4:07.1). The new WM was quickest GTP (3:52.9, 18th), the Osella led the 2-litre Group 6 (3:56.2, 22nd) comfortably ahead of the Sauber. Hervé Poulain's turbo Porsche was the first Group 4 in 32nd (4:07.0).

Twenty-four cars broke the 4-minute barrier this year, compared to only twelve in 1976. After qualifying Pironi and Jaussaud chose to keep the bubble canopy, which they estimated was worth an extra 15 kp/h (10 mph) on the back straight. Both Depailler and Jabouille, driving the new A443, had found the bubble claustrophobic and causing bad reflections at night, so they asked for it to be removed from their car. Pironi and Jaussaud, in the A442B, however, chose to keep theirs. The non-qualifiers were selected from the slowest in several classes to keep a balanced quota. In Group 6, the ToJ was well off the pace, but DeCadenet's second car was unlucky to be bumped, having done the 19th fastest time.

== Race ==
=== Start ===
On a sunny Saturday morning before the main event, there was a half-hour race for historic cars. In a slight anachronism, it was Stirling Moss, coming out of retirement, who won driving a Maserati 250F Grand-Prix car. Moss had previously had two second places at Le Mans in 11 attempts, in 1953 and 1956. Second and third were a pair of Jaguar D-Types.

The honorary starter this year was legendary French cyclist Raymond Poulidor who had recently retired. Things started going wrong for Porsche from the start when Jabouille roared past Ickx into the Dunlop curve. At the end of the first lap, it was Jabouille twelve seconds ahead of Ickx, Wollek, Schurti in the 935 and Pironi. But at the end of the next lap, there was a sensation when both Ickx and Haywood had to pit their Porsches. The former had high fuel pressure, while the latter had loose turbo pipes and a jammed throttle. Both rejoined several laps later, but Renault had Jabouille, Pironi and Jarier now running 1-2-3 line ahead of Wollek which is how it stayed to the first pitstops. Ragnotti's Calberson-Ranault was fifth with the two Mirages were next, Leclère ahead of Laffite. Then came Schurti, the De Cadenet and Sourd, in the WM turbo, leading GTP and rounding out the top 10. But in those pitstops, the leaders were delayed by a bad tyre-change and Depailler came out in fifth.

In the third hour, the Mirage of Michel Leclère stopped on the far side of the track with a complete electrical failure. Four laps later the sister-car was refuelling and could not restart. In replacing the dead battery, a pit-man left a live wire on the chassis and when the key was turned it fried the electrics. Repairing that cost almost thirty minutes, dropping them to 30th. Early casualties in the Group 5 class were the highly favoured Loos Porsche and one of the Kremer Porsches, both put out with broken pistons.

Meanwhile, Ickx was driving hard back through the field. By 8 pm he had the Porsche back up to 6th. But, just on 9 pm they lost fifth gear and all that work was undone as they lost 37 minutes while the gearbox was repaired, dropping them back to 19th. To that was added power loss and an ignition problem. So, in a repeat of the decision in the previous year's race, Ickx was pulled from his ailing car to help the surviving Wollek/Barth car. Jochen Mass, the reserve driver, was brought in to co-drive with Pescarolo. So as night fell, the Porsche was fourth (93 laps) chasing the French cars a lap ahead. Stommelen, duelling with the Calberson-Renault (92) with Haywood (89) and Craft (88) next. Three laps further back (85) were the American 935s: Busby's Kremer, and Barbour, leading the IMSA class, in tenth.

=== Night ===
The De Cadenet had been stopped early – a wheel weight had come off and fired through the chassis; it was running eighth, then the clutch started failing in the evening that eventually caused a 100-minute stop at 2 am to rebuild. It started a long drive back through the field.

By 11 pm, after 7 hours, Renault held their 1-2-3 sequence. Jabouille/Depailler were back in the lead at dusk after the Pironi/Jaussaud car spent 7 minutes changing brake pads. Ickx was putting in an epic night-drive, ably assisted by Wollek and together they were consistently fast. To catch the French cars, Porsche pushed the turbo pressure of their leading car up from 1.4 to 1.5 bar. This extra speed gradually allowed them to reel in the cars ahead of them. But again, the progress was lost by several stops to correct dodgy wheel fittings. However in the half-hour before midnight, they progressively passed two of the Renaults to move back up into second place. Then when the Jarier/Bell car, running third, stopped at the Tertre Rouge with a broken transmission at 2.30am, alarm bells started ringing for the French team. Haywood's #7 Porsche was up to fifth, Stommelen/Schurti were sixth in the 935 and Pescarolo/Mass had got back up to seventh. Earlier, just after midnight, the Toleman Osella had been leading the Group 6 2-litre class when it crashed at high speed following a puncture at the Mulsanne kink. Driver Dieter Quester got a nasty gash to his face but was otherwise all right.

So at the halfway point, with Renault running 1-3-4 and Porsche ready to pounce in 2-5-6-7, the race was keenly balanced. The Mirage had driven back through the field up to tenth. This time the mechanical issues struck every works Porsche: At 4am, Pescarolo pitted with electrical issues losing six laps. Their best-placed car had two stops to fix bad handling, and then Haywood lost 4 laps as the mechanics fixed a power-loss. Finally, the 935 was delayed getting a new fuel-pump fitted. The hard-working Mirage then had the throttle linkage break undoing their effort. The eighty minutes to repair dropped them back down to 17th.

=== Morning ===
In the cooler air, Jabouille put in the fastest lap of the race setting a new lap record of 3:34.2. As the light got better, the second Dick Barbour IMSA 935 crashed spectacularly. Bob Garretson lost control at the Mulsanne kink and rolled over and over for more than half a kilometre. Them at 7am, there was another big accident at almost the same location. Tony Charnell was leading the 2-litre class when his Mogil Motors Chevron lost a suspension link at over 260 kp/h (160 mph). Although the car flew into the trees and went to pieces, Charnell was uninjured. Not long after, at 8am, the Ragnotti/Fréquelin/Dolhem #4 car lost 32 minutes repairing its gearbox. Then at 8.30 am was the third major accident in two hours, far more serious, when Christian Débias crashed the turbo WM P78 at top speed on the Hunaudières Straight. The force was such to break the car in three and pull the barrier out of the ground. Pulled out unconscious, despite a fractured skull and many broken ribs, Débias would make a full recovery.

The Porsche challenge started fading when Wollek brought his car into the pits just before 9 am with the same ailment that had struck their team-mate earlier: no fifth gear and another 37 minutes lost. The Calberson-Renault also had trouble with its gearbox, losing third gear and taking 20 minutes to repair. The Renault team wound back the turbo boost on their race-leader, but then half an hour later Depailler coasted to a halt at Mulsanne corner in a cloud of smoke with a jammed gearbox. After leading for 11 hours, it was out with a holed piston, in an alarming echo of the previous year. The Pironi/Jaussaud car, a lap behind, inherited the lead with a comfortable 7-lap lead over the Haywood/Gregg Porsche. Jabouille was transferred to the Calberson Renault to help bring it home.

Before noon the Barth/Wollek/Ickx overtook its stablemate to move into second place. In the 20th hour, Mass crashed in the Porsche Curves having just got up to sixth. The works 935 had a very difficult race, with a myriad of problems: a stuck throttle, leaking radiator, loose windscreen, replacing the distributor and the fuel pump. Every 16 laps, the minimum allowed, it needed a complete oil refill. All up the car spent nearly 3 hours in the pits.

=== Finish and post-race ===
But Renault would not be denied this year. With a 30-minute lead, the Pironi/Jaussaud car, despite a fading clutch, ran faultlessly for the rest of the race to take the victory, finishing five laps ahead of the two works Porsches. Fourth was the Calberson Renault, 11 laps behind their team-mates, despite a dodgy fourth gear. Four Porsche 935s finished next, led home by the IMSA-class winning car of Dick Barbour Racing, beating the Group 5 winner from Kremer Racing by a lap. For experienced sports-car campaigner, Brian Redman, this was his first Le Mans finish. Jean Rondeau came through to win the GTP class for the third year in a row, having the small pleasure of beating his former car by 15 laps (200 km). The Mirage drivers, Schuppan and Laffite, had been bedevilled by mechanical issues through the day, including three gearbox malfunctions and a broken turbo costing a total of four hours in the pits. But the drivers persisted and were rewarded with a tenth-place finish.

From the biggest class-entry there was but a single classified finisher from the Group 6 2-litres: Michel Pignard getting back-to-back victories for himself and Société ROC. The winner of the Group 4 GT class, in twelfth, was the Porsche 911 of Anny-Charlotte Verney. After an early gearbox issue, the car had run well, outlasting the more powerful 934 turbos. Their troubles meant they took the class-lead in the 8th hour and were never headed. The only other classified finisher in the class was the privateer entry of "Ségolen", also afflicted by gearbox problems and 20 laps behind. In a race of attrition, where many cars had had mechanical issues and delays, there were eight cars that would not be classified as they had not completed the 70% threshold (259 laps). Marc Surer and his Sauber team missed out by just 2 laps. Having initially led the class, they had to undergo a full gearbox rebuild in the early evening, then were plagued by an overheating and misfiring engine. It had been in the pits for much of the afternoon until going out to take the flag. After gearbox problems took out the Ferraris, the only one to finish was the Migault/Guitteny 365, which by coincidence, had also finished 16th the year before with the same drivers but had covered 6 further laps.

Race-winner Didier Pironi had put in a double-shift at the end. Completely exhausted, he needed to be lifted out of the cockpit and given medical attention to get to the podium, leaving an emotional Jaussaud to take the trophy. He and Pironi had covered a record distance of 5044 km in the 24 hours. The race victory meant a lot to Renault, and France. As the team's Competition Director and former race-winner, Gérard Larrousse put it:

" The sales battle in Europe has never been so tough. The commercial fall-out of a race like this is far more obvious than the technical spin-offs, for a victory at Le Mans is one that cannot he doubted”.

With the greater weighting on American races (that most European teams did not attend), the World Challenge for Endurance Drivers was won by John Paul Snr. By also taking a second at the 24 Hours of Daytona, Dick Barbour won the Daytona-Le Mans Trophy.

This time it had been Porsche that had the unreliability issues and Renault Alpine finally achieved its aim of a Le Mans win. Straight after the race, the Renault Managing Director, Bernard Hanon, announced it was mission accomplished and that they would withdraw from sports-car racing to put their focus henceforth onto Formula 1. For the event, the ACO had spent over 1 million francs (£125,000). With the withdrawal of the major local manufacturer, drawcard and sole competition, the organisation was very worried about the next year, and the financial losses if the crowds stayed away, disinterested.

== Official results ==
=== Finishers ===
Results taken from Quentin Spurring's book, officially licensed by the ACO
Class winners are in Bold text.

Pos	Class	No.	Team	Drivers	Chassis	Engine	Tyre	Laps
1	**Gr.6**; **S 3.0**	**2**	**(France) Renault Sport**	**(France) Didier Pironi** **(France) Jean-Pierre Jaussaud**	Renault Alpine A442B	Renault 2.0L V6 twin-turbo	M	369
2	Gr.6; S 3.0	6	(West Germany) Martini Racing Porsche System	(West Germany) Jürgen Barth (France) Bob Wollek (Belgium) Jacky Ickx	Porsche 936-78	Porsche 935/73 2.1L F6 twin-turbo	D	364
3	Gr.6; S 3.0	7	(West Germany) Martini Racing Porsche System	(United States) Hurley Haywood (United States) Peter Gregg (West Germany) Reinhold Joest	Porsche 936-77	Porsche 911/78 2.1L F6 turbo	D	362
4	Gr.6; S 3.0	4	(France) Renault Sport / (France) Écurie Calberson	(France) Guy Fréquelin (France) Jean Ragnotti (France) José Dolhem (France) Jean-Pierre Jabouille	Renault Alpine A442A	Renault 2.0L V6 twin-turbo	M	358
5'	**IMSA**; **GT**	**90**	**(United States) Dick Barbour Racing**	**(United States) Dick Barbour** **(United Kingdom) Brian Redman** **(United States) John Paul Sr.**	Porsche 935-77	Porsche 930/78 3.0L F6 turbo	G	337
6	**Gr.5**; **SP**	**44**	**(West Germany) Porsche Kremer Racing**	**(United States) Jim Busby** **(United States) Chris Cord** **(United States) Rick Knoop**	Porsche 935-77	Porsche 930/72 3.0L F6 turbo	G	336
7	Gr.5; SP	41	(France) ASA Cachia / (Brazil) Team Pace	(Brazil) Alfredo Guaraná (Brazil) Paulo Gomes (Brazil) Mário Amaral	Porsche 935-77	Porsche 3.0L F6 turbo	D	329
8	Gr.5; SP	43	(West Germany) Martini Racing Porsche System	(West Germany) Rolf Stommelen (Liechtenstein) Manfred Schurti	Porsche 935-78	Porsche 935/79 3.2L F6 twin-turbo	D	326
9	**GTP**	**72**	**(France) J. Rondeau** (private entrant)	**(France) Jean Rondeau** **(France) Bernard Darniche** **(France) Jacky Haran**	Rondeau M378	Cosworth DFV 3.0L V8	G	294
10	Gr.6; S 3.0	10	(United States) Grand Touring Cars Inc	(Australia) Vern Schuppan (France) Jacques Laffite (United States) Sam Posey	Mirage M9	Renault 2.0L V6 turbo	G	293
11	**Gr.6**; **S 2.0**	**31**	**(France) Société Racing Organisation**; **Course La Pierre du Nord**	**(France) Michel Pignard** **(France) Lucien Roussiaud** **(Switzerland) Laurent Ferrier**	Chevron B36	Simca-ROC 2.0L S4	G	284
12	**Gr.4**; **GT**	**66**	**(France) A.-C. Verney** **(private entrant) /** **BP Racing**	**(France) Anne-Charlotte Verney** **(France) Xavier Lapeyre** **(France) François Servanin**	Porsche 911 Carrera RSR	Porsche 3.0L F6	M	279
13	GTP	71	(Switzerland) André Chevalley Racing (private entrant)	(Switzerland) André Chevalley (Switzerland) François Trisconi	Inaltéra LM77	Cosworth DFV 3.0L V8	G	279
14	IMSA; GTX	97	(United Kingdom) Charles Ivey Racing	(Australia) Larry Perkins (United Kingdom) Gordon Spice (United States) John Rulon-Miller	Porsche 911 Carrera RS	Porsche 3.0L F6	G	278
15	Gr.6; S 3.0	8	(United Kingdom) A. De Cadenet (private entrant)	(United Kingdom) Alain de Cadenet (United Kingdom) Chris Craft	De Cadenet LM78	Cosworth DFV 3.0L V8	G	273
16	IMSA; GTX	86	(France) Écurie Grand Competition Cars (United States) North American Racing Team	(France) François Migault (France) Lucien Guitteny	Ferrari 365 GT/4 BB	Ferrari 4.9L F12	G	262
17	Gr.4; GT	62	(France) "Ségolen" (private entrant)	(France) "Ségolen" (André Gahinet) (France) Christian Bussi (France) Jean-Claude Briavoine	Porsche 934	Porsche 3.0L F6 turbo	M	259
N/C*	Gr.6; S 2.0	23	(Switzerland) P. Sauber AG / (Switzerland) Francy Racing	(Switzerland) Marc Surer (Switzerland) Eugen Strähl (Switzerland) Harry Blumer	Sauber C5	BMW-Mader 2.0L S4	P	257
N/C*	Gr.6; S 2.0	20	(Switzerland) Cheetah Racing Cars	(Switzerland) Sandro Plastina (Switzerland) Mario Luini (France) Jean-Daniel Grandjean	Cheetah G-601	Cosworth BDG 2.0L S4	G	250
N/C*	Gr.4; GT	64	(France) G. Bourdillat (private entrant)	(France) Georges Bourdillat (France) Alain-Michel Bernhard (France) Jean-Luc Favresse	Porsche 911 Carrera RSR	Porsche 3.0L F6	M	241
N/C*	Gr.6; S 2.0	25	(France) Team Pronuptia	(France) Bruno Sotty (France) Gérard Cuynet (France) Jean-Claude Dufrey	Lola T294/296	Cosworth FVC 1.9L S4	G	238
N/C*	Gr.6; S 2.0	24	(France) Team Pronuptia	(France) Michel Elkoubi (France) Pierre Yver (France) Philippe Streiff	Lola T296	Cosworth FVC 1.9L S4	G	232
N/C*	Gr.6; S 2.0	28	(France) D. Lacaud (private entrant)	(France) Dominique Lacaud (France) Michel Lateste (France) Jean-François Auboiron	Lola T297	BMW 2.0L S4	G	217
N/C*	Gr.5; SP	45	(West Germany) Porsche Kremer Racing	(West Germany) “John Winter” (Louis Krages) (West Germany) Dieter Schornstein (France) Philippe Gurdjian	Porsche 935-77	Porsche 3.0L F6 turbo	G	182

- Note *: Not classified because did not cover sufficient distance (70% of their winner) at the 12, 18 or 24-hour intervals.

=== Did not finish ===
Pos	Class	No	Team	Drivers	Chassis	Engine	Tyre	Laps	Reason
DNF	Gr.6; S 3.0	1	(France) Renault Sport	(France) Jean-Pierre Jabouille (France) Patrick Depailler	Renault Alpine A443	Renault 2.1L V6 turbo	M	279	Gearbox (20hr)
DNF	Gr.6; S 3.0	5	(West Germany) Martini Racing Porsche System	(Belgium) Jacky Ickx (France) Henri Pescarolo (West Germany) Jochen Mass	Porsche 936-78	Porsche 935/73 2.1L; F6 twin-turbo	D	255	Gearbox (20hr)
DNF	IMSA; GTX	88	(France) Pozzi Thompson JMS Racing	(France) Jean-Claude Andruet (Italy) Spartaco Dini	Ferrari 512 BB	Ferrari 4.9L F12	M	251	Engine (22hr)
DNF	IMSA; GTX	87	(United States) Luigi Chinetti Sr.	(France) Jacques Guérin (France) Jean-Pierre Delaunay (United States) Gregg Young	Ferrari 512 BB	Ferrari 4.9L F12	G	232	Engine (19hr)
DNF	IMSA; GTX	89	(France) Pozzi Thompson JMS Racing	(France) Claude Ballot-Léna (France) Jean-Louis Lafosse	Ferrari 512 BB	Ferrari 4.9L F12	M	218	Accident (18hr)
DNF	Gr.6; S 3.0	19	(United Kingdom) IBEC Racing Developments	(United Kingdom) Guy Edwards (United Kingdom) Ian Grob (United Kingdom) Ian Bracey	Ibec-Hesketh 308LM	Cosworth DFV 3.0L V8	G	195	Engine (20hr)
DNF	Gr.6; S 2.0	30	(France) Société Racing Organisation; Course / La Pierre du Nord	(France) Jacques Henry (France) Albert Dufrène (Morocco) Max Cohen-Olivar	Chevron B36	Simca-ROC 2.0L S4	G	195	Gearbox (19hr)
DNF	GTP	78	(France) WM AEREM; Team Esso Aseptogyl	(France) Xavier Mathiot (France) Marc Sourd (France) Christian Debias	WM P78	Peugeot PRV 2.7L V6 turbo	M	186	Accident (18hr)
DNF	Gr.6; S 2.0	27	(United Kingdom) Mogil Motors Ltd / Kores Racing	(United Kingdom) Tony Charnell (United Kingdom) Robin Smith (France) Fréderic Alliot (United Kingdom) Richard Jones	Chevron B31	Cosworth BDG 2.0L S4	G	181	Accident (16hr)
DNF	GTP	76	(France) WM AEREM; Team Esso Aseptogyl	(France) Christine Dacremont (France) Marianne Hoepfner	WM P76	Peugeot PRV 2.9L V6	M	171	Accident (19hr)
DNF	Gr.4; GT	68	(France) H. Poulain (private entrant)	(France) Hervé Poulain (West Germany) Edgar Dören (West Germany) Gerhard Holup (Luxembourg) Roman Feitler	Porsche 934	Porsche 3.0L F6 turbo	G	167	Gearbox (17hr)
DNF	Gr.6; S 3.0	3	(France) Renault Sport	(United Kingdom) Derek Bell (France) Jean-Pierre Jarier	Renault Alpine A442A	Renault 2.0L V6 twin-turbo	M	162	Gearbox (12hr)
DNF	IMSA; GTX	91	(United States) Dick Barbour Racing	(United States) Bob Garretson (United States) Steve Earle (United States) Bob Akin	Porsche 935-77	Porsche 3.0L F6 turbo	G	159	Accident (15hr)
DNF	Gr.6; S 2.0	29	(France) Société Racing Organisation; Course / Modylook	(France) Michel Dubois (France) Daniel Gache (France) Julien Sanchez	Chevron B36	Simca-ROC 2.0L S4	G	142	Chassis (15hr)
DNF	Gr.5; SP	48	(Switzerland) Mecarillos-Cégécol Racing Team	(Switzerland) Herbert Müller (Switzerland) Claude Haldi (Switzerland) "Nico" (Nick McGranger)	Porsche 935	Porsche 3.0L F6 turbo	G	140	Accident (14hr)
DNF	Gr.6; S 2.0	26	(Switzerland) GVEA	(Switzerland) Georges Morand (France) Eric Vaugnat (Switzerland) Christian Blanc	Lola T296	Cosworth BDG 2.0L S4	G	130	Accident (13hr)
DNF	Gr.6; S 2.0	21	(France) J.-M. Lemerle (private entrant)	(France) Jean-Marie Lemerle (France) Alain Levié (France) Pierre-François Rousselot	Lola T294	Simca-ROC 2.0L S4	G	126	Engine (13hr)
DNF	Gr.4; GT	65	(France) J. Laplacette (private entrant)	(France) Joël Laplacette (France) Yves Courage (Switzerland) Antoine Salamin (Switzerland) Gérard Vial	Porsche 911 Turbo (930)	Porsche 3.3L F6 turbo	M	116	Engine (12hr)
DNF	Gr.6; S 2.0	34	(United Kingdom) BMW (GB) Racing (United Kingdom) Toleman Delivery	(Austria) Dieter Quester (United Kingdom) Tom Walkinshaw (South Africa) Rad Dougall	Osella PA6	BMW M12 2.0L S4	P	113	Accident (10hr)
DSQ	Gr.6; S 3.0	12	(United Kingdom) Simon Phillips Racing (private entrant)	(United Kingdom) Simon Phillips (United Kingdom) Nick Faure (United States) John Beasley (United Kingdom) Martin Raymond	De Cadenet-Lola T380	Cosworth DFV 3.0L V8	G	99	Insufficient distance (13hr)
DNF	Gr.6; S 2.0	32	(United Kingdom) Dorset Racing Associates	(United Kingdom) Ian Harrower (United Kingdom) Juliette Slaughter (United Kingdom) Brian Joscelyne	Lola T294	Cosworth FVC 2.0L S4	G	61	Accident (13hr)
DNF	Gr.4; GT	61	(France) Auto Daniel Urcun (private entrant)	(France) Guy Chasseuil (France) Jean-Claude Lefévre	Porsche 934	Porsche 3.0L F6 turbo	D	61	Gearbox (7hr)
DNF	GTP	77	(France) WM AEREM; Team Esso Aseptogyl	(France) Jean-Daniel Raulet (France) Max Mamers	WM P77	Peugeot PRV 2.7L V6 turbo	M	44	Fuel pump (7hr)
DNF	Gr.5; SP ^{1}	94	(United States) Whittington Bros. Racing	(United States) Don Whittington (United States) Bill Whittington (Austria) Franz Konrad	Porsche 935-77	Porsche 3.0L F6 turbo	G	41	Accident (9hr)
DNF	IMSA; GTX	85	(Belgium) "Beurlys" (private entrant)	(Belgium) "Beurlys" (Jean Blaton) (Belgium) Teddy Pilette (France) Raymond Touroul	Ferrari 512 BB	Ferrari 4.9L F12	M	39	Gearbox (5hr)
DNF	Gr.4; GT	69	(France) Frères Ravenel VSD (private entrant)	(Belgium) Willy Braillard (France) Jean-Louis Ravenel (France) Jean "Jacky" Ravenel	Porsche 934	Porsche 3.0L F6 turbo	D	35	Engine (8hr)
DNF	Gr.5; SP	46	(West Germany) Porsche Kremer Racing	(United Kingdom) Martin Raymond (Belgium) "Steve" (Jean-Pierre Wielemans) (United Kingdom) Mike Franey	Porsche 935-77	Porsche 3.0L F6 turbo	G	34	Engine (4hr)
DNF	Gr.6; S 3.0	11	(United States) Grand Touring Cars	(United States) Sam Posey (France) Michel Leclère	Mirage M9	Renault 2.0L V6 turbo	G	33	Engine (7hr)
DNF	IMSA; GTX	84	(United States) Brad Frisselle Racing; Wynn's Belgium	(United States) Brad Frisselle (United States) Bob Kirby (United States) John Hotchkis	Chevrolet Monza	Chevrolet 5.7L V8	G	30	Engine (5hr)
DSQ	Gr.6; S 2.0	33	(United Kingdom) Cloud Engineering (United Kingdom) Dorset Racing Associates	(United Kingdom) Bob Evans (United Kingdom) Richard Down	Lola T294	Cosworth FVC 2.0L S4	G	23	Insufficient distance (4hr)
DNF	Gr.5; SP	47	(West Germany) Weisberg Gelo Team	(United Kingdom) John Fitzpatrick (Netherlands) Toine Hezemans	Porsche 935-77	Porsche 3.0L F6 turbo	G	19	Engine (4hr)

Notes:

- **^1**—The No. 94 Whittington Brothers Porsche was entered and numbered in the IMSA-class but sources then show its results being in the Group 5 class

=== Did not start ===
Pos	Class	No	Team	Drivers	Chassis	Engine	Tyre	Reason
DNQ	Gr.6; S 3.0	9	(United Kingdom) A. de Cadenet (private entrant)	(United Kingdom) Bob Evans (United Kingdom) John Cooper (United Kingdom) Pete Lovett	De Cadenet-Lola LM77	Cosworth DFV 3.0L V8	G	Did not qualify
DNQ	Gr.6; S 3.0	14	(West Germany) BP Racing (private entrant)	(West Germany) Jörg Obermoser (France) Guy Chasseuil (France) Hubert Striebig	ToJ SC303	Cosworth DFV 3.0L V8	D	Did not qualify
DNQ	Gr.6; S 2.0	22	(France) L'Agence Locomotiv (private entrant)	(Italy) Anna Cambiaghi (France) Jean-Claude Guérie (France) Martine Rénier	Lola T296/297	Simca-ROC 2.0L S4	G	Did not qualify
DNQ	Gr.5; SP	40	(West Germany) AMG Motorenbau GmbH	(West Germany) Hans Heyer (West Germany) Clemens Schickentanz	Mercedes-Benz 450 SLC	Mercedes-Benz 4.5L V8	G	Did not qualify
DNQ	Gr.4; GT	60	(Switzerland) Mecarillos Racing Team	(France) Gérard Bleynie (France) Roland Ennequin (United Kingdom) Simon Delatour	Porsche 934	Porsche 3.0L F6 turbo	M	Did not qualify
DSQ	Gr.4; GT	63	(France) C. Gouttepifre (private entrant)	(France) Christian Gouttepifre (France) René Boubet (France) Raymond Touroul	Porsche 911 Carrera RS	Porsche 3.0L F6	M	Illegal engine
DNQ	Gr.4; GT	73	(France) B. Decure (private entrant)	(France) Marcel Mignot (France) Guy de Saintpierre	Alpine A310	Renault PRV 2.7L V6	M	Did not qualify
DNQ	IMSA; GT	96	(France) Garage du Bac (private entrant)	(France) Alain Cudini (Belgium) Pierre Dieudonné (France) "Dépnic" (Jean-Claude Depince)	BMW 3.5 CSL	BMW M30 3.5L S6	D	Did not qualify
DNQ	IMSA; GT	98	(France) T. Perrier (private entrant)	(France) Thierry Perrier (France) Joël Mouetron (France) Jean Belliard	Porsche 911 Carrera RS	Porsche 3.0L F6	D	Did not qualify
DNA	Gr.5; SP	42	(West Germany) Konrad Racing	(Austria) Franz Konrad (West Germany) Volkert Merl	Porsche 935-77	Porsche 3.0L F6 turbo		Did not arrive
DNA	Gr.5; SP	50	(United Kingdom) Morfe Racing with Polaroof	(United Kingdom) Richard Jenvey (United Kingdom) John Morrison	Lotus Esprit S1	Lotus 907 2.0L S4		Did not arrive
DNA	GTP	70	(United Kingdom) R. Hamilton (private entrant)	(United Kingdom) Robin Hamilton (United Kingdom) David Preece	Aston Martin DBS	Aston Martin 5.3L V8 turbo		Did not arrive
DNA	IMSA; GT	92	(France) Holly Cars LSA		Porsche 934	Porsche 3.0L F6 turbo		Did not arrive

=== Class winners ===
Class	Winning car	Winning drivers
Group 6 S Sports 3-litre	#2 Renault Alpine A442B	Pironi / Jean-Pierre Jaussaud *
Group 6 S Sports 2-litre	#31 Chevron B36	Pignard / Roussiaud / Ferrier
Group 5 SP Special Production	#44 Porsche 935-77	Busby / Cord / Knoop *
Group 4 GTS Special GT	#66 Porsche 911 Carrera RSR	Verney / Lapeyre / Servanin
GTP Le Mans GT Prototype	#72 Rondeau M378	Rondeau / Darniche / Haran
IMSA GTX GT Experimental	#90 Porsche 935-77	Barbour / Redman / Paul Snr. *

- Note: setting a new class distance record.

=== Index of Energy Efficiency ===
Pos	Class	No	Team	Drivers	Chassis	Score
1	Gr.6; S 3.0	6	(West Germany) Martini Racing Porsche System	(West Germany) Jürgen Barth (France) Bob Wollek (Belgium) Jacky Ickx	Porsche 936-78	0.98
2	Gr.6; S 3.0	7	(West Germany) Martini Racing Porsche System	(United States) Hurley Haywood (United States) Peter Gregg (West Germany) Reinhold Joest	Porsche 936-77	0.96
3	Gr.6; S 3.0	8	(United Kingdom) A. De Cadenet (private entrant)	(United Kingdom) Alain de Cadenet (United Kingdom) Chris Craft	De Cadenet LM78	0.91
4	Gr.6; S 3.0	2	(France) Renault Sport	(France) Didier Pironi (France) Jean-Pierre Jaussaud	Renault Alpine A442B	0.91
5	Gr.6; S 3.0	4	(France) Renault Sport / (France) Écurie Calberson	(France) Guy Fréquelin (France) Jean Ragnotti (France) José Dolhem (France) Jean-Pierre Jabouille	Renault Alpine A442A	0.85
6	Gr.6; S 2.0	31	(France) Société Racing Organisation; Course La Pierre du Nord	(France) Michel Pignard (France) Lucien Roussiaud (Switzerland) Laurent Ferrier	Chevron B36	0.81
7	GTP	72	(France) J. Rondeau (private entrant)	(France) Jean Rondeau (France) Bernard Darniche (France) Jacky Haran	Rondeau M378	0.77
8	GTP	71	(Switzerland) André Chevalley Racing (private entrant)	(Switzerland) André Chevalley (Switzerland) François Trisconi	Inaltéra LM77	0.65
9	Gr.4; GT	66	(France) A.-C. Verney (private entrant) / BP Racing	(France) Anne-Charlotte Verney (France) Xavier Lapeyre (France) François Servanin	Porsche 911 Carrera RSR	0.65
10	IMSA; GTX	97	(United Kingdom) Charles Ivey Racing	(Australia) Larry Perkins (United Kingdom) Gordon Spice (United States) John Rulon-Miller	Porsche 911 Carrera RS	0.61

- Note: Only the top ten positions are included in this set of standings.

=== Statistics ===
Taken from Quentin Spurring's book, officially licensed by the ACO

- Fastest lap in practice –J. Ickx, #6 Porsche 936-78– 3:27.6secs; 236.53 km/h (146.97 mph)
- Fastest lap –J.-P. Jabouille, #1 Renault Alpine A443 – 3:34.2secs; 229.24 km/h (142.44 mph)
- Winning distance – 5,044.53 km (3,134.53 mi)
- Winner's average speed – 210.21 km/h (130.62 mph)
- Attendance – 150,000

Citations
