= Anny-Charlotte Verney =

French racing and rally driver

- Nationality: France
- Born: 17 May 1943 (age 82); Le Mans, France

24 Hours of Le Mans career
- Years: 1974–1983
- Teams: Private entries, Kremer Racing, Cooke-Woods Racing, Garrettson Developments, Jean Rondeau
- Best finish: 6th (1981)
- Class wins: 1 (1978)

Anny-Charlotte Verney (born 17 May 1943) is a French racing and rally driver. She competed in the 24 Hours of Le Mans for ten straight years from 1974 to 1983, achieving a best overall finish of sixth in 1981, and a class win in 1978. She participated in the 1982 Dakar Rally with Mark Thatcher, son of British prime minister Margaret Thatcher, as her co-driver and navigator. Along with their mechanic Jacky Garnier, they became lost for five days in their Peugeot 504 but were rescued after a military search.

== Complete 24 Hours of Le Mans results ==
Year	Team	Co-Drivers	Car	Class	Laps	Pos.	Class Pos.
1974	(France) Pierre Mauroy	(France) Pierre Mauroy (France) Martine Rénier	Porsche 911 Carrera RSR	GT	276	13th	7th
1975	(France) Anny-Charlotte Verney	(Belgium) Yvette Fontaine (France) Corinne Tarnaud	Porsche 911 Carrera RS	GT; Ser.	294	11th	2nd
1976	(France) Louis Meznarie	(France) Hubert Striebig (Germany) Helmut Kirschoffer	Porsche 934	Gr.5	288	13th	6th
1977	(France) Anny-Charlotte Verney	(France) René Metge (France) Dany Snobeck (France) Hubert Striebig	Porsche 911 Carrera RSR	Gr.5	254	18th	2nd
1978	(France) Anny-Charlotte Verney	(France) Xavier Lapeyre (France) François Servanin	Porsche 911 Carrera RSR	GT; 3.0	279	12th	1st
1979	(France) Anny-Charlotte Verney	(France) Patrick Bardinon (France) René Metge	Porsche 934	GT +3.0	251	19th	3rd
1980	(Germany) Malardeau Kremer Racing	(France) Xavier Lapeyre (France) Jean-Louis Trintignant	Porsche 935 K3	Gr.5	217	DNF	DNF
1981	(United States) Cooke-Woods Racing	(United States) Bob Garretson (United States) Ralph Kent-Cooke	Porsche 935 K3	IMSA; GTX	327	6th	2nd
1982	(United States) Garretson Developments	(United States) Bob Garretson (United States) Ray Ratcliff	Porsche 935 K3	IMSA; GTX	299	11th	5th
1983	(France) Jean Rondeau	(United Kingdom) Vic Elford (France) Joël Gouhier	Rondeau M379	C	136	DNF	DNF
