= Juliette Slaughter =

Juliette Slaughter (née Scott-Gunn; 18 October 1945 – 14 August 2012) was a British racing driver and press officer. She was a competitor in Formula Ford 1600 cars, saloon car racing and sports car racing from 1970 to 1980, competing in events such as the 24 Hours of Le Mans.

== Biography ==
Slaughter was born in Northampton on 18 October 1945, the daughter of a professional artist and the vicar Noel Carey Potter. Her father was a racing driver at Brooklands in the 1930s and she was educated a convent. Slaughter became interested in racing when she took part in car rallies. She began competing in motor races in November 1970 and got some tuition on a course at the Jim Russell Racing Drivers' School at Snetterton Circuit. At the time, she was working as an assistant to a sales manager dealing in men's toliteries. In 1971, Slaughter won the British Women Racing Drivers Club (BWRDC) Novice Award (known as the Helen Spence Trophy championship series) for the best woman novice driver after obtaining sponsorship from an Italian count, competing in Formula Ford 1600 cars, saloon cars and sports cars. She later qualified for an international racing licence enabling her to race abroad. In 1972, Slaughter drove a Ford Escort Sport in a newly created production car category with financial sponsorship after securing a victory in her class at Brands Hatch. That August, she raced in the BWRDC's Fast Girls Ford Consul Challenge at Brands Hatch.

She took semi-retirement from racing between 1972 and 1975 and focused on her job in the fashion industry as an assistant personnel manager at the Bracknell head office of Dorothy Perkins. Slaughter did take part in some races of the Castrol Group One Saloon Car Championship and the Britmax Group One Saloon Car Championship alongside her husband in a Mazda RX-3 in 1973. She returned to full-time in 1975, competing in the BWRDC Shell Sport Ford Escort Championship. Slaughter finished sixth in that championship in 1976 and set the car class lap record of the Brands Hatch short circuit. The following year, she raced a Renault 5 TS, set lap records at the Thruxton Circuit and Snetterton circuits and won the BWRDC's Embassy Trophy for the best races against male drivers. Slaughter also shared a Lola T490 sports car with Divina Galica in sports car races. She was runner-up to Galica in the major BWRDC's Goodwin and ShellSport championships, and was a judge for the P. J. Evans Women Driver of the Year. In 1978, Slaughter became employed by Brands Hatch as a press officer on weekdays after selling flats in Chiswick, West London.

That year saw her reach an agreement to drive a P. J. Evans-entered Leyland TR7 sports car in two national production sports car series and 20 races. Slaughter furthermore took part in the SodaStream Sports 2000 Championship in the Kelly Girl-entered Lola T490, drove a Renault 5 in the Renault Gunk Challenge and a Triumph TR7 in the production sports car racing. She secured a season-high fourth-place finishes. Slaughter entered the 1978 24 Hours of Le Mans race alongside her male co-drivers Ian Harrower and Tony Birchenough in sharing the No. 32 Dorset Racing Lola T294S-Ford. The car retired early on the Sunday morning with an engine failure caused by a piston failure, having running as high as fourth at one point.

Although she had received offers to race in the United States, Slaughter announced her retirement from racing in August 1978. In the following year, after an eight-month spell in retirement, she drove a Triumph Dolomite Sprint production saloon in the ShellSport Derwent Television Saloon Car Championship 2000 series as well as finishing 22nd overall in the Gordon Ramsey-entered Porsche 924 with Win Percy in the 1979 6 Hours of Brands Hatch. Slaughter did not compete in the 1979 24 Hours of Le Mans. She competed in a Mayfair-backed Volkswagen Scirocco GLi in the Rolatruc production saloon championship in 1980. Slaughter achieved one second-place finish and five third-place results as well as coming ninth overall in the No. 33 Bell & Colvill-entered Lola T492-Ford at the 1980 6 Hours of Brands Hatch.

Slaughter was appointed director of promotions for Motor Sport Developments on 1 January 1981. She left the job in January 1983 to focus on her work in public relations.

== Personal life ==
She married South African-born racing driver Andy Slaughter in July 1972. Slaugher died of cancer on 14 August 2012.

== 24 Hours of Le Mans results ==
Year	Team	Co-Drivers	Car	Class	Laps	Pos.	Class Pos.
1978	(United Kingdom) Dorset Racing Associates	(United Kingdom) Ian Harrower (United Kingdom) Brian Joscelyne	Lola T294-Ford	Gr.6 S 2.0	61	DNF	DNF
