= Bob Garretson =

American racing driver (1933–2025)

Oliver Robert Garretson (April 8, 1933 – April 13, 2025) was an American racing driver.

== Biography ==
Garretson was the owner-driver of a Porsche 935 sports car team named Garretson Enterprises in the early 1980s that competed part-time in both the World Sportscar Championship and IMSA GT Championship. During 1978, he won the Sebring 12 hours. In 1981 along with veteran Brian Redman and Bobby Rahal, Garretson won the 24 Hours of Daytona. Despite not winning another race that season, he won the 1981 World Endurance Championship for Drivers title which was the first awarded. He sold the team and retired from racing shortly thereafter.

In 2019, Garretson was elected to the FIA Hall of Fame for his accomplishment as part of the FIA Hall of Fame's sportscar wing. WEC season-long champions are inducted into the FIA Hall.

Garretson died at his home in Warrenton, Virginia on April 13, 2025, at the age of 92.

== Racing results ==
=== 24 Hours of Le Mans results ===
Year	Team	Co-Driver(s)	Car	Class	Laps	Pos.	Class Pos.
1978	(United States) Dick Barbour Racing	(United States) Bob Akin (United States) Steve Earle	Porsche 935/77	IMSA GTX	159	DNF	DNF
1979	(United States) Dick Barbour Racing	(United States) Edwin Abate (United States) Skeeter McKitterick	Porsche 935/78	IMSA GTX	283	8th	3rd
1980	(United States) Dick Barbour Racing	(Canada) Allan Moffat (United States) Bobby Rahal	Porsche 935 K3	IMSA	134	DNF	DNF
1981	(United States) Cooke-Woods Racing	(United States) Ralph Kent-Cooke (France) Anny-Charlotte Verney	Porsche 935 K3	IMSA GTX	328	6th	2nd
1982	(United States) Garretson Developments	(United States) Ray Ratcliff (France) Anny-Charlotte Verney	Porsche 935 K3	IMSA GTX	299	11th	5th
