= Max Mamers =

French former racing driver (born 1943)

Marcel "Max" Mamers (born 26 May 1943 in Objat) is a French former racing driver.
