= 1977 24 Hours of Le Mans =

45th 24 Hours of Le Mans endurance race

Previous: 1976	Next: 1978
Index: Races | Winners

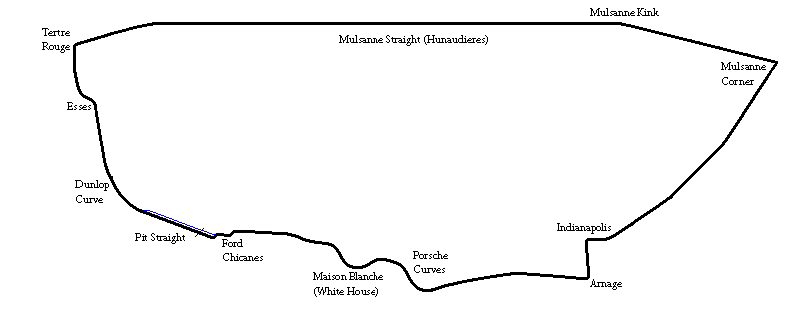
Le Mans in 1977

The 1977 24 Hours of Le Mans was the 45th Grand Prix of Endurance, and took place on 11 and 12 June 1977. The second year of the FIA Group 5 and Group 6 regulations, it produced an exciting race right up to the end. Porsche had withdrawn from the Group 6 Championship, citing a lack of broad competition. Renault, before their move into Formula 1, decided to put its main racing focus for the year onto Le Mans. The two works teams were the pre-race favourites.

From the start the Alpine-Renaults took charge. The works Porsches mounted a brief challenge but engine issues delayed them in the pits. When Pescarolo retired his 936 with engine problems, his co-driver Jacky Ickx was transferred to the sister car of Barth/Haywood, languishing in 41st place and 15 laps behind the leaders. Ickx was given free rein to drive as hard as he dared and in an epic drive through the night, his average pace was just two seconds below qualifying pace. During the night, the French challenge started to come apart – Tambay's car, running fourth, stopped at 3am with a dead engine. An hour later, the second car lost half an hour getting a gearbox rebuild. Then at 9am, after leading for 17 hours, the Jabouille and Bell car retired with a burnt-out piston.

Suddenly, Porsche found itself in the lead. Ickx finished his marathon effort after a total of eleven hours behind the wheel. Barth and Haywood kept up his pace and when the last Renault retired just another midday with another burnt piston, they could ease off with a huge 19-lap lead over the Mirage of Schuppan/Jarier. However, with only three-quarters of an hour to go, Barth pitted running on five cylinders. The mechanics treated the engine and waited, until with ten minutes to go he rolled back out onto the circuit to complete two final laps. Despite the delay, they still finished 11 laps ahead of the Mirage, the biggest winning margin of the decade. The French Porsche 935 of ASA-Cacchia was third, a further 16 laps behind, with the GTP Inaltéra of owner-driver Jean Rondeau, and Alain de Cadenet both barely ninety seconds behind.

== Regulations ==
This was the second year of the latest CSI regulations. The FIA still insisted on running dual Championships for Group 6 (World Championship for Sports Cars) and the World Championship for Makes for Groups 4 and 5. Group 6 allowed either a standard production engine up to 5-litre capacity or racing engines up to 3-litres (or 2.1 litres if turbo-charged). Group 5 encouraged manufacturers to adapt and modify their Touring (Group 2) and Grand Touring (Group 4) cars, including an aerodynamic silhouette body-shell. Once again, like the year before, the Automobile Club de l'Ouest (ACO) was put off by the small championship fields and decided to run both classes together in the race. And, once again, this put them at odds with the FIA who excluded them from their championships.

The Group 2 Touring Car class, never strongly supported, was dropped this year. However, some Class 2 cars were entered in the IMSA and Group 5 classes instead. Maintaining its ties with the IMSA organisation, they accepted entries under the American GTO regulations. The ACO also took entries from their own evolved rules of the CSI system: GTP, a closed-body development of Group 6, and GTX from Group 5.

After complaints by Renault the previous year of the fuel quality which had compromised their car's race, the Octane rating was raised to 100.6, the same as that used in Formula 1. Limitations of the distance between refuelling stops were finally removed, although cars had a fuel tank maximum of 160 litres.

After a year's abeyance, the fuel-economy trophy was restored: renamed as the Index of Energy Efficiency. A table of target fuel consumption was drawn up against average speed, and that reference figure was divided by the actual consumption. The final checks were made at the hour-22 fuel stops so that cars would not artificially benefit from slowing down at the end to conserve fuel.

== Entries ==
The ACO received 88 applications, across the 7 classes with 62 arriving for qualifying on race week. The only manufacturer works teams were from Porsche and Renault, although there were entries from several small-scale racing specialists like Inaltéra, Mirage, Osella and WM. The rise of turbo-powered cars continued with them making up 23 of the 62 cars.

Class	Large-engines >2.0L classes	Medium-engines < 2.0L classes	Turbo engines
Group 6 S Sports	13 / 12	11 / 9	8 / 0
Group 5 SP Special Production	8 / 8	-	5
Group 4 GTS Special GT	11 / 10	-	7
GTP Le Mans GT Prototype	6 / 5	-	3
GTX Le Mans GT Experimental	1 / 1	-	0
IMSA GT	12 / 10	-	0
Total Entries	51 / 46	11 / 9	23

- Note: The first number is the number of arrivals, the second the number who started.

=== Group 6 and GTP ===
The Martini-Porsche works team had chosen not to contest the FIA Championship citing the lack of competition. The 1977 evolution of the Porsche 936 had a more aerodynamic shell, as well as being narrower. The 2.1-litre flat-6 engine had twin KKK (Kühnle, Kopp & Kausch) turbos and with two exhausts now it could develop 540 bhp and get up to almost 350 kp/h (215 mph) when the turbo was wound up. Two cars were entered with the all-star pairing of triple-champions Jacky Ickx and Henri Pescarolo in one and Jürgen Barth paired with debutante Hurley Haywood (himself a triple Daytona 24-hours winner) in the other.

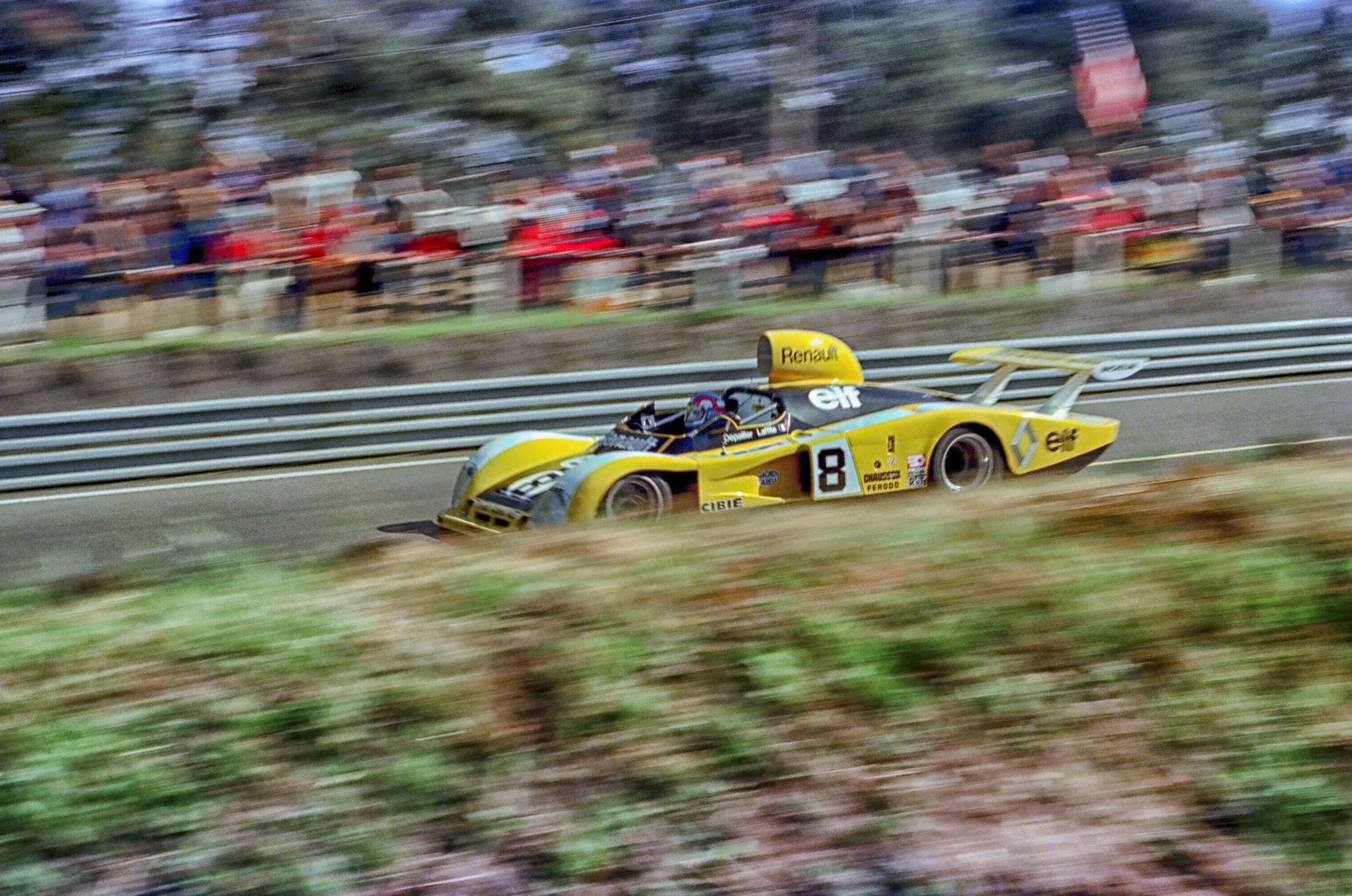
Patrick Depailler in a Renault-Alpine A442

Renault-Alpine had also chosen not to run in the Championship, to make a major effort for the Le Mans win before focusing on Formula 1. Extensive work was done on the A442: it was lengthened to improve handling and larger, 14" front wheels fitted to allow bigger brakes. Aerodynamic testing was done on unopened autoroutes and in four separate endurance runs at the modern Circuit Paul Ricard. The test-car covered over 11,000 km. Renault engineers found the failure of the single car last year had been the low-grade fuel used. The company spent FF3 million (£400,000) and sixty pit-crew were on hand to support an all-out effort. The driver lineup featured some of France's leading single-seater drivers with Jacques Laffite / Patrick Depailler and Patrick Tambay / Jean-Pierre Jaussaud, while the third car had veterans Jean-Pierre Jabouille and Derek Bell. In addition, Hugues de Chaunac, manager of the Martini-Renault Formula 2 team was given the test-car as a client entry for his young drivers René Arnoux and Didier Pironi.

Mirage managers Harley Cluxton and John Horsman had contemplated running the Renaults. However, in the end they instead chose to upgrade the M8 with the 490 bhp Renault turbo engine, to replace the Cosworth DFV. Renault Sport's director Gérard Larrousse agreed, as long as each car ran a French driver. The chassis was modified with a new airbox to cool the turbo. Team regular Vern Schuppan was paired with Jean-Pierre Jarier and American Sam Posey teamed up with Michel Leclère. Jarier was a late substitute for Jean-Louis Lafosse who had not arrived with promised sponsorship money, which gave the lawyers work to argue in court.

Alain de Cadenet, with his regular co-driver Chris Craft, returned with their latest modified version of the Lola T380, the LM77. The rear wing of the car patriotically celebrating the Queen's Silver Jubilee. Once again they did their habit of arriving, and preparing the car, at the last minute in the paddock. Their car from the previous year was bought by Simon Phillips of the Dorset Racing Associates team and was co-entered with de Cadenet. French privateer, Xavier Lapeyre, again entered his Lola T286.

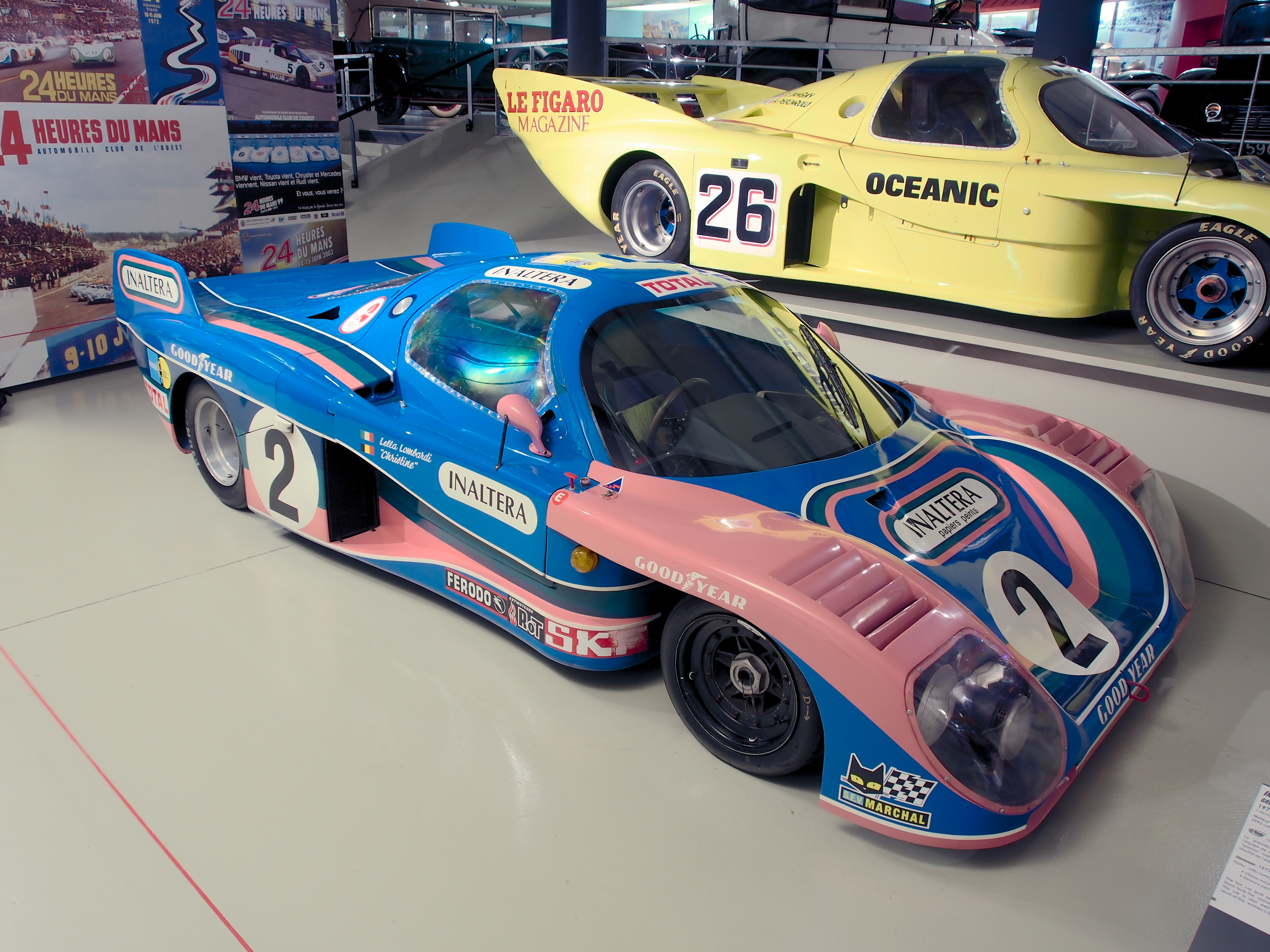
Jean Rondeau's Inaltéra LM77

Le Mans local Jean Rondeau's team had had an excellent debut the previous year winning the new GTP class. This year, three cars were entered – still bearing the name of their sponsor, French home-furnishings company Inaltéra. One stayed in the GTP class (driven by Rondeau himself, with Jean Ragnotti) while the other two were lightened by 95 kg and modified to run in the Group 6 class. French Formula 1 veteran Jean-Pierre Beltoise drove one with American Al Holbert and the other had the all-female pairing of Italian Lella Lombardi with Belgian Christine Beckers.

Former Peugeot staff Gérard Welter and Michel Meunier were back with their WM P76 in GTP class. The Peugeot 2.7-litre V6 engine put out 250 bhp. They also completed a second P77 chassis, this time fitted with a KKK turbo that increased the power output to a far more competitive 380 bhp. Another all-French entry was Bernard Decure's modified Alpine A310, fitted with the V6 PRV engine. Another GTP entry saw the return to Le Mans of Aston Martin. Entered by Englishman Robin Hamilton, his DBS V8 had progressively been modified to meet Group 4 and Group 5 regulations. The 5.3-litre V8, with its extensive modifications, put out 510 bhp and got the car up to 300 kp/h (188 mph). Being the heaviest car in the field, the French fans nick-named it le petit camion ("little lorry") and the ACO allowed him to switch across to the GTP class. Hamilton was joined by his regular co-driver David Preece along with Mike Salmon, who had been one of the drivers of the last Aston Martin entry, back in 1964. French rally driver Robert Neyret ran his Lancia Stratos again in the GTP class, the 2.4-litre Ferrari V6 modified with a KKK-turbo. This year female driver Christine Dacremont was partnered with Marianne Hoepfner.

=== Group 6 (2-litre) ===
The under-2000 class was spiced up with new manufacturers entering what had been a Lola versus Chevron battle, and there was a good 11-strong field. The class encouraged mixing the chassis with a choice of engine. The French engine-builder, Société ROC, had three of the latest B36 Chevrons (the lightest cars in the race) while the British Chandler-Ibec team ran a Chevron-Ford. Their compatriots Dorset Racing had a Lola-Ford as did the Swiss GVEA team while French privateer Jean-Marie Lemerle had a Lola-ROC combination.

Having moved on from Formula Two, Osella had been the leading 2-litre marque in the World Championship, often running second to the 3-litre Alfa Romeos. One of the FA5 works cars was entered, with its 2-litre BMW engine. Enzo Osella replaced his usual driving line-up for the race with Alain Cudini, Raymond Touroul and Anna Cambiaghi. Peter Sauber's little Swiss outfit had built a small number of monocoques for hill-climbing. He was now looking at circuit racing with the C5, also powered by the BMW engine. Herbert Müller had won the 1976 Interserie trophy with it and now they looked to Le Mans. It would be driven by fellow Swiss Eugen Strähl and Peter Barnhard. The other entries were two from another small Swiss manufacturer, Cheetah. Charles Graemiger had a new BMW-powered G601 for privateer Daniel Brillat, while the older G501-Cosworth was prepared for Inaltéra owner André Chevalley.

=== Group 5 and GTX ===
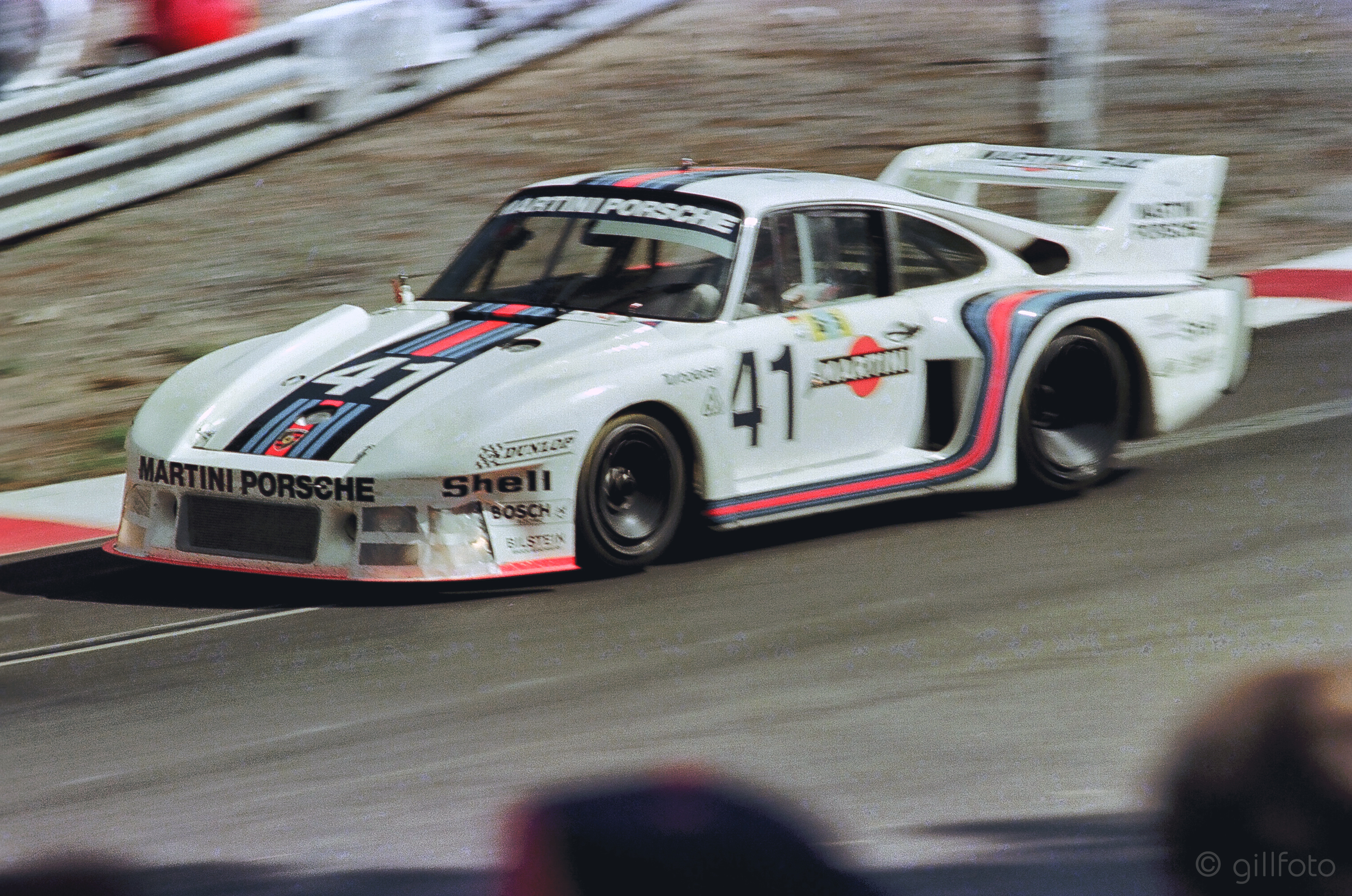
Stommelen/Schurti works Porsche 935-77

Porsche had been dominating the World Championship winning every round against sporadic competition from BMW, who were concentrating on the DRM championship in Germany. This year, Porsche built 13 of the 935 for general sale, at £35,000 each. So the Group 5 entry list was the sole preserve of Porsche.

For Le Mans, the Martini-Porsche works team entered their Championship car, the 935/77 iteration. Engineer Norbert Singer had tweaked the aerodynamics and trimmed more weight. The single turbo was replaced by two smaller KKK-turbos that reduced the throttle-lag and lifted the output a bit, to 630 bhp. This propelled the car down the Mulsanne straight at 323 kp/h (201 mph). With Ickx running the 936 and Jochen Mass no longer doing 24-hour events, driving duties were handed, once again, to the other team drivers Rolf Stommelen and Manfred Schurti. Three customer teams entered their 1976-spec cars. Georg Loos had two cars for Klaus Ludwig/Toine Hezemans and Tim Schenken/Hans Heyer (current DRM champion). The French JMS Racing team car was prepared by Henri Cachia for Claude Ballot-Léna with American champion Peter Gregg. The Kremer brothers modified their car further, with more weight-saving and aerodynamic additions. The K2 would be driven by Brits John Fitzpatrick, Nick Faure and Guy Edwards. The other entrants in Group 5 were privateers with modified Porsche 911s or 934 turbos. The sole taker of the Le Mans GTX regulations was a modified 3-litre Porsche Carrera RS entered by the Swiss Porsche Club Romand.

=== Group 4 and IMSA GT ===
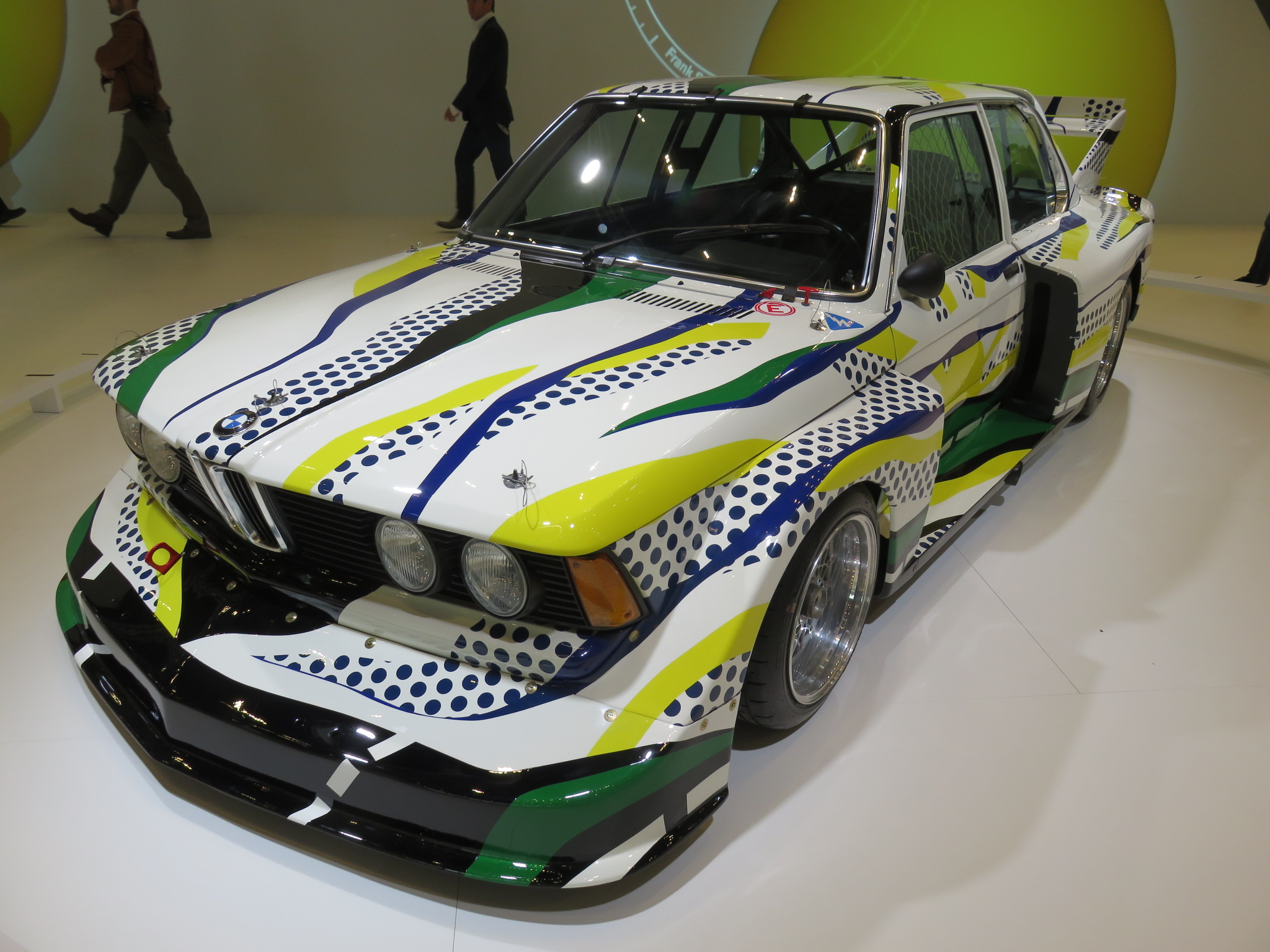
This year's BMW “Art-car”, painted by Roy Lichtenstein

Like the Group 5 entry list, the Group 4 class was a Porsche benefit and the ten entries were a mix of 934 turbos (480 bhp) and 911 Carreras (340 bhp). However, a multinational list added interest, with the German Kremer team and French JMS Racing team backing up their group 5 entries, taking on the Spanish Escuderia Montjuich and the two cars of the Swiss Schiller Racing team. BMW had reduced their participation in Group 5 racing, with the works team changing from the 3.0 CSL, to running the new 320i in Group 2 racing. With Group 2 no longer an option at Le Mans, the cars were instead allowed into the IMSA-GT category. The Belgian Luigi Racing team (current holders of the European Touring Car Championship) entered two BMW 3.0 CSLs, one for champions Pierre Dieudonné and Jean Xhenceval, with Spartaco Dini, and the other for Eddy Joosen and Claude de Wael with Tom Walkinshaw brought in. They travelled straight from Brno, where they had raced the weekend before in the ETCC.

Recent efforts by the ACO to draw Le Mans and American road-racing closer together did not bear any fruit this year, with no NASCAR or super-modified IMSA cars entered. Auctioneer and gentleman driver Hervé Poulain's latest BMW Art Car was painted this year by American Roy Lichtenstein. The 320i model was dominating the 2-litre class in the ETCC, but despite superior handling, its 300 bhp was left behind in the IMSA one-engine size class. Nevertheless, Poulain enjoyed strong BMW backing from Jochen Neerpasch and a factory pit-crew. After the argument on the startline between NART and ACO at the 1975 race there had been no Ferrari presence at the race last year. However, NART returned this year, running a Ferrari 365 BB last raced at the 1975 12 Hours of Sebring. It would be driven by Frenchmen, and former Ferrari privateers, Lucien Guitteny and François Migault.

== Practice and Qualifying ==
Once again there were two days of formal practice, on Wednesday and Thursday, running from 6pm to midnight. The first evening was virtually washed out by rain with few teams choosing to get out onto the circuit. Manfred Schurti, in the Group 5 Martini-Porsche was surprisingly fastest ahead of the Group 6 cars. On the Thursday, Jean-Pierre Jabouille took pole position with a new lap record of 3:31.7, over a second faster than his pole time in 1976, with his stablemate Laffite in second. Ickx got his Porsche into third, a full seven seconds faster than his qualifying-time from the year before. Next were the other two Renaults, while Ickx's teammate Stommelen, got the 935 into sixth as the fastest Group 5 car. The two Loos Porsches were behind the works teams in 8th and 9th, while the Lapeyre Lola rounded out the top-10 ahead of the two Mirages. Horsman had found his cars were lacking top-end speed (almost 30 kp/h (20 mph) slower than their fellow Renaults) and the drivers complaining of feeling their helmets sucked up toward the airscoop. Beltoise qualified the uprated Inaltéra in 13th, fully 9 seconds faster than he did the year before with the same chassis. Eighteen cars broke the 4-minute barrier this year, compared to only twelve the previous year. These included the leading GT car, the Kremer Porsche of Bob Wollek (17th), and the Osella (18th) as the fastest of the 2-litre Group 6 field – both ahead of Rondeau's Inaltéra GTP (20th with 4:00.7). The Ravenel brothers' BMW was the fastest IMSA entry in 36th (4:21.7), while the Aston Martin was the last qualifier (4:31.8). It only made the start-line as Jean-Louis Chateau's Porsche 935 got bumped as he had not been able to qualify his co-drivers. Among the non-qualifiers was the new Cheetah, where considerable problems stopped it setting a time. The Dorset Racing team, running the second De Cadenet, also did not run. On Wednesday night, their French translator had been showering at the track medical centre when toxic fumes caused him to collapse. He was rushed to hospital but never regained consciousness and died the following day.

== Race ==
=== Start ===
Race-day was cool and blustery. The honorary starter this year was Pierre Ugeux, President of the CSI. Jabouille took the lead from the rolling start. Pironi, fulfilling his potential role as the 'hare', vaulted straight up to second. However, after running the equivalent of almost two Le Mans in preparation, the Renault test-car could not even complete one lap in the race. At the end of the Hunaudières straight, an oil-line split in Pironi's engine starting a major fire. He got to the Mulsanne firepost and got out uninjured. At the end of the first lap it was Jabouille leading the 935 of Stommelen, then Ickx, Laffite and Tambay. It was a busy first hour in the pits. Rondeau needed the clutch adjusted on his GTP car and Klaus Ludwig's Gelo 935 blew its engine after just 4 laps. Chris Craft brought the De Cadenet in with a dodgy clutch, losing nine minutes. Then after 8 laps, Stommelen was in the pits with his car suffering from a loose rocker shaft and losing oil. Dropping three laps, he had to cruise for 16 laps before being allowed to top up with oil, but the damage had been done and they retired before nightfall. Things got worse for Porsche when the Barth/Haywood car was stopped for 20 minutes with a faulty fuel pump then another 30 minutes with a blown head gasket, dropping them to 41st.

Soon after the first fuel-stops, on lap 15, Fitzpatrick brought the Kremer 935 crawling into the pits, It had been running 8th and the last car on the lead lap. It was retired with burnt out cylinder-liners. The better fuel economy of the Porsches was soon apparent with the Renaults refuelling after 18-19 laps, while Ickx/Pescarolo managed 23 laps. After two hours, Jabouille, Ickx and Laffite had done 31 laps, Tambay fourth a lap behind. Another lap back were the Mirages, the remaining Gelo 935 and Beltoise in the Inaltéra. Over half the 2-litre field had had mechanical issues but the class-leading Osella was running well in 12th overall. In the fourth hour, the de Cadenet lost time in the pits suffering overheating from being run too lean, dropping down to 22nd. Then shortly before 8pm, Pescarolo was duelling for the lead with Jabouille who had just pitted. Pulling out of Indianapolis and racing toward Arnage, he over-revved the engine and broke a conrod, generating a long smoke trail and forcing the car's retirement. This left the Renaults running 1-2-3 again, several laps ahead of the Mirages. The Porsche team transferred Ickx, their premier driver, to the other 936 in the forlorn hope that it could get back up the field for a podium place. It was now 15 laps behind the leaders.

So at 8pm, after four hours, Jaussaud/Bell had done 62 laps, a lap ahead of their team-mates. Fourth, two laps back, was now the Ludwig/Hezemans Gelo Porsche ahead of the two Mirages and the Beltoise/ Holbert Inaltéra. The French 935 was 8th (56) and second in class, the GTP Inaltéra ninth. The Schiller Racing Porsche of Haldi/Vetsch was tenth (55) leading the GTs, the Sauber in 13th now led the 2-litre class (after the Osella was delayed) while the Béguin 911 had moved up from 39th to 19th to lead the IMSA class.

At dusk the Posey/Leclère Mirage, running sixth, stuttered to a halt. Unbeknownst to the team, the fuel pump had sprung a leak and the tank had run dry. An hour later, the sister car, then running third pitted with its alternator bouncing around its engine bay, which cost it two places.

=== Night ===
At the 9pm fuel stops, Beltoise's Inaltéra was getting refuelled when the hose detached, pouring fuel into the cockpit. He got out without incident and the liquid was mopped up. However, a stray spark ignited the fumes and started a flash fire. Fortunately the damage was light, but it took seventy minutes to get the car going again and by then it had fallen from fifth to fifteenth. The Porsche works team was in tatters, with just the one car left, languishing in the bottom half of the field. Ickx was told to win the race, or break the car trying. By 9pm they had got back up to ninth.

Given such free rein, Ickx put in an incredible stint, at times pulling in the leaders at over ten seconds a lap. Over the next thirteen hours, Barth and Haywood only drove one shift each as Ickx did his epic drive through the night, the equivalent of five F1 Grands Prix. Breaking the lap record over and over again, his average lap-time in the dark was only two seconds slower than qualifying pace. From being 41st after two hours, by 9pm he had got the car back up to ninth, and by midnight up to fifth, behind the three Alpine-Renaults (Jaussaud/Bell having done 123 laps) and the Loos Porsche (117). The remaining Mirage was sixth (114), ahead of the Cachia 935 (112), the Schiller Porsche (110), the De Cadenet back up to ninth and the women's Inaltéra in tenth (109).

Then things started unravelling for Renault. Coming up to 3am, Tambay's engine died with no oil pressure, when approaching Indianapolis. At the halfway mark, 4am, the leading Renault had completed 185 laps, averaging just over 15 laps an hour. The second Renault was two laps back and still four laps ahead of Ickx. The Loos 935 was comfortable in fourth (175), ahead of the Mirage (171), the De Cadenet (170) and the Cachia 935 (167 laps). An hour later, the Laffite/Depailler car was parked for over 30 minutes to rebuild its gearbox. This put the Ickx/Barth/Haywood Porsche up into second place having made back 9 of the 15 laps from the leading Renault. The large number of mechanical issues had spread out the field. The GTP Inaltéra was well back in 8th (172), while the ROC Chevron leading the 2-litre class broke into the top-10 (171) and about to overtake the marooned third Renault. After the first Schiller Porsche had retired, the other team car had taken over the lead of Group 4 and was running 11th overall, until they too fell out with engine issues less than two hours later. The IMSA class had been a close race through the night with four successive leaders: the Béguin and Cachia Porsches, the remaining Luigi BMW then the Charles Ivey Porsche leading into the new day.

=== Morning ===
As dawn broke a heavy rain shower swept the track, catching out many drivers. That included the leader Jabouille who had a huge spin at the Ford Chicane and was fortunate not to hit anything. Another was Chris Craft, who aquaplaned off. It took an hour to repair the brakes and front end of the De Cadenet, dropping them to ninth. The Sauber that had been running well, second in class and tenth overall, retired with a broken gearbox. Such was the spread of the field by now that, at 6am, the gap between first and tenth had grown to 41 laps.

Ickx's marathon effort finally finished at 9.10am, having driven the maximum allowable time for a driver. He handed the car back to the equally fast Barth, Minutes later, the French spectators were stunned when the engine of Jabouille's Alpine-Renault blew up in a cloud of smoke going down the Hunaudières straight. He limped round to the pit, but after leading for over 17 hours, the car was retired with a broken piston. That meant the Porsche was now leading, two laps ahead of the much-delayed Laffite/Depailler car, having also driven back through the field. The Frenchmen pressed hard to make up the gap, pulling a lap back on the Porsche, and only six minutes behind.

The Gelo Porsche had been comfortably holding down fourth through the night and into the morning. Just before 11am, now up to third, it came to the pits smoking. The pitcrew changed the turbo in just twelve minutes but more stops never fixed the problems and the engine stopped the car out on the track an hour later.

=== Finish and post-race ===
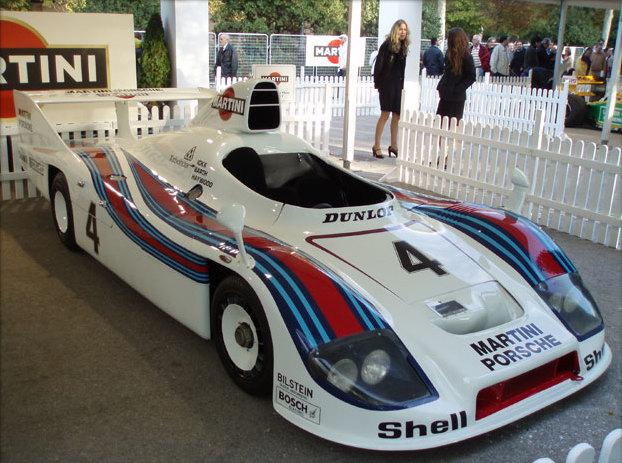
#4 Porsche 936/77-001, Le Mans winner 1977

A disastrous race for Renault ended just before midday when the remaining car also stopped out of Indianapolis with another broken piston. This left the Porsche (294 laps) with a huge 16-lap over the Schuppan/Jarier Mirage (278). Third, a long way back, was Rondeau's Inaltéra (262), then the ASA Cachia Porsche (260), and the rapidly closing De Cadenet (257), none of whom had overtaken the stopped Loos car. There were just 23 cars left running. In the blazing afternoon heat, Barth and Haywood dropped their lap times by over fifteen seconds. However, what could have been a steady cruise to the finish became a major drama when Haywood coasted into the pits with less than an hour to go, with smoke trailing from the Porsche. It was another holed piston. The mechanics disconnected the turbos, isolated the faulty cylinder and told Barth to wait. Meanwhile, after being delayed earlier in the afternoon the Inaltéra had dropped to fourth, but now both they and Craft were reeling in the French 935, all getting onto the same lap going into the final hour.

With ten minutes to go and having lost 5 laps, Barth slowly eased back onto the track with a clock strapped to the steering wheel to carefully monitor the remaining time. The regulations were that a car had to complete the final lap within a certain percentage of the previous lap. Barth completed two careful laps to limp to an improbable victory, their sizeable lead over the Mirage trimmed to eleven laps – still the biggest winning margin for the decade. In the end third (a distant sixteen laps further back) went to the Porsche 935 of Claude Ballot-Léna and Peter Gregg, as Group 5 winners. The final margin was just 40 seconds ahead of Jean Rondeau's GTP-winning Inaltéra and 90 seconds to Chris Craft (who had done most of the driving) in the De Cadenet.

In a battle of attrition, the only finisher in the Group 6 2-litre class was the Pignard/Dufrène/Henry Chevron-ROC. The Dorset Racing Lola had overheated early on, and then been bedevilled by gearbox and suspension issues throughout the race and although it did finally get to the finish, it could not be classified having only covered 213 laps. Bob Wollek vindicated his decision to drive the Kremer Porsche by finishing 7th as Group 4 class-winner, by 17 laps. It had not been an easy victory for them, replacing the universal joint, and steering and suspension issues. Eighth was the Luigi Racing BMW of Dieudonné/Xhenceval/Dini. Around midnight they had lost time fixing the gearbox but took the IMSA class victory ahead of the Porsches. Ninth, and second in class was Hervé Poulain's BMW Art Car after a very reliable run. Both the Ferrari and Aston Martin finished (16th and 17th respectively) after spending most of the race chasing each other.

By some fortuitous luck, the Mirage team had survived. They had not got the maximum-speed testing in the US needed for simulating the long straights of Le Mans. Thereby unable to tweak the aerodynamics, they soon had found their cars were not getting sufficient airflow onto the turbos. This meant the cars were running very fuel-rich and consuming about 20% more fuel than the works cars. Which, in turn, ran their engines cooler and protected the pistons enough from burning out. The same had happened the year before, but the Renault technicians had put it down to the fuel used.

Soon after the race, Charles James left Inaltéra as chairman. The new board wanted to be out of motorsport and sold the cars. Jean Rondeau could not afford to buy them, and instead they were sold to Swiss race-engine specialist Heini Mader.

It was appropriate that one of Jacky Ickx's greatest drives, a full eleven hours, would give him his fourth victory, equalling the record held by Olivier Gendebien who was on hand to witness his Belgian compatriot's feat.

== Official results ==
=== Finishers ===
Results taken from Quentin Spurring's book, officially licensed by the ACO Class Winners are in Bold text

Pos	Class	No.	Team	Drivers	Chassis	Engine	Tyre	Laps
1	**Gr.6**; **S 3.0**	**4**	**(West Germany) Martini Racing Porsche System**	**(West Germany) Jürgen Barth** **(United States) Hurley Haywood** **(Belgium) Jacky Ickx**	Porsche 936-77	Porsche 911/78 2.1L F6 twin-turbo	D	342
2	Gr.6; S 3.0	10	(United States) Grand Touring Cars Inc	(Australia) Vern Schuppan (France) Jean-Pierre Jarier	Mirage M8	Renault 1997cc V6 turbo	G	331
3	**Gr.5**; **SP**	**40**	**(France) JMS Racing** **(France) ASA Cachia**	**(France) Claude Ballot-Léna** **(United States) Peter Gregg**	Porsche 935	Porsche 2.9L F6 turbo	D	315
4	**GTP**	**88**	**(France) Inaltéra**	**(France) Jean Rondeau** **(France) Jean Ragnotti**	Inaltéra LM77	Cosworth DFV 3.0L V8	G	315
5	Gr.6; S 3.0	5	(United Kingdom) A. de Cadenet (private entrant)	(United Kingdom) Alain de Cadenet (United Kingdom) Chris Craft	De Cadenet-Lola LM77	Cosworth DFV 3.0L V8	G	315
6	**Gr.6**; **S 2.0**	**26**	**(France) Société Racing Organisation**; **Course**	**(France) Michel Pignard** **(France) Albert Dufrène** **(France) Jacques Henry**	Chevron B36	Simca-ROC 1996cc S4	G	303
7	**Gr.4**; **GT**	**58**	**(West Germany) Porsche Kremer Racing**	**(France) Bob Wollek** **(Belgium) "Steve” (Jean-Pierre Wielemans)** **(France) Philippe Gurdjian**	Porsche 934	Porsche 3.0L F6 turbo	G	298
8	**IMSA**; **GT**	**71**	**(Belgium) Luigi Racing**	**(Belgium) Pierre Dieudonné** **(Belgium) Jean Xhenceval** **(Italy) Spartaco Dini**	BMW 3.0 CSL	BMW M30 3.2L S6	D	291
9	IMSA; GT	50	(France) H. Poulain (private entrant)	(France) Hervé Poulain (France) Marcel Mignot	BMW 320i	BMW M12 1991cc S4	G	287
10	IMSA; GT	61	(France) C. Gouttepifre (private entrant)	(France) Christian Gouttepifre (France) Philippe Malbran (France) Alain Leroux	Porsche 911 Carrera RS	Porsche 3.0L F6	D	281
11	Gr.6; S 3.0	2	(France) Inaltéra	(Italy) Lella Lombardi (Belgium) Christine Beckers	Inaltéra LM77	Cosworth DFV 3.0L V8	G	279
12	IMSA; GT	70	(France) JMS Racing (France) ASA Cachia	(France) Jean-Pierre Delaunay (France) Jacques Guérin (United Kingdom) Simon Delautour	Porsche 911 Carrera RSR	Porsche 3.0L F6	D	275
13	Gr.6; S 3.0	1	(France) Inaltéra	(France) Jean-Pierre Beltoise (United States) Al Holbert	Inaltéra LM77	Cosworth DFV 3.0L V8	G	275
14	IMSA; GT	79	(France) Frères Ravenel (private entrant)	(France) Jean-Louis Ravenel (France) Jean ‘Jacky’ Ravenel (France) Jean-Marie Détrin	Porsche 911 Carrera RS	Porsche 3.0L F6	D	274
15	GTP	86	(France) WM AEREM	(France) Max Mamers (France) Jean-Daniel Raulet	WM P76	Peugeot PRV 2.7L V6	M	274
16	IMSA	75	(United States) North American Racing Team	(France) François Migault (France) Lucien Guitteny	Ferrari 365 GT/4 BB	Ferrari 4.4L V12	G	268
17	GTP	83	(United Kingdom) R. Hamilton (private entrant)	(United Kingdom) Robin Hamilton (United Kingdom) David Preece (United Kingdom) Mike Salmon	Aston Martin DBS	Aston Martin 5.3L V8	D	260
18	Gr.5; SP	47	(France) A.-C. Verney (private entrant) / BP	(France) Anne-Charlotte Verney (France) René Metge (France) Dany Snobeck (France) Hubert Striebig	Porsche 911 Carrera RSR	Porsche 3.0L F6	D	254
19	Gr.4; GT	56	(France) JMS Racing (France) ASA Cachia	(France) Jean-Louis Bousquet (France) Cyril Grandet (France) Philippe Dagoreau	Porsche 934	Porsche 3.0L F6 turbo	D	253
20	IMSA; GT	77	(Belgium) Wynn's International	(United States) Dennis Aase (United States) Bob Kirby (United States) John Hotchkis	Porsche 911 Carrera RSR	Porsche 3.0L F6	G	246
N/C*	Gr.6; S 2.0	31	(United Kingdom) Dorset Racing Associates	(United Kingdom) Ian Harrower (Republic of Ireland) Martin Birrane (Netherlands) Ernst Berg (United Kingdom) Richard Down	Lola T294	Cosworth BDA 1950cc S4	G	213

- Note *: Not Classified because did not cover sufficient distance (70% of the leader) at the 12, 18 or 24-hour intervals.

=== Did Not Finish ===
Pos	Class	No	Team	Drivers	Chassis	Engine	Tyre	Laps	Reason
DNF	Gr.6; S 3.0	8	(France) Équipe Renault Elf	(France) Patrick Depailler (France) Jacques Laffite	Renault Alpine A442	Renault 1997cc V6 twin-turbo	**M**	289	Engine (21hr)
DNF	Gr.5; SP	39	(West Germany) Gelo Racing Team	(West Germany) Klaus Ludwig (Australia) Tim Schenken (West Germany) Hans Heyer (Netherlands) Toine Hezemans	Porsche 935	Porsche 2.9L F6 turbo	**G**	269	Engine (21hr)
DNF	Gr.6; S 3.0	9	(France) Équipe Renault Elf	(France) Jean-Pierre Jabouille (United Kingdom) Derek Bell	Renault Alpine A442	Renault 1997cc V6 twin-turbo	**M**	257	Engine (18hr)
DNF	GTX	96	(Switzerland) GVEA (Switzerland) Porsche Club Romand	(Switzerland) André Savary (Switzerland) Jean-Robert Corthay (Switzerland) Antoine Salamin	Porsche 911 Carrera RS	Porsche 3.0L F6	**M**	211	Engine (19hr)
DNF	IMSA; GT	78	(United Kingdom) Charles Ivey Engineering	(United States) John Rulon-Miller (United Kingdom) John Cooper (United Kingdom) Peter Lovett	Porsche 911 Carrera RSR	Porsche 3.0L F6	**G**	198	Engine (18hr)
DNF	IMSA; GT	80	(France) B. Béguin (private entrant)	(France) Bernard Béguin (France) René Boubet (France) Jean-Claude Briavoine	Porsche 911 Carrera RS	Porsche 3.0L F6	**D**	191	Engine (17hr)
DNF	Gr.6; S 2.0	25	(France) Société Racing Organisation; Course	(Morocco) Max Cohen-Olivar (France) Alain Flotard (France) Michel Dubois	Chevron B36	Simca-ROC 1996cc S4	**G**	176	Oil Leak (17hr)
DNF	Gr.6; S 2.0	21	(Switzerland) P. Sauber AG / (Switzerland) Francy Racing	(Switzerland) Eugen Strähl (Switzerland) Peter Bernhard	Sauber C5	BMW M12 1998cc S4	**G**	161	Gearbox (14hr)
DNF	Gr.4; GT	59	(Switzerland) Schiller Racing	(France) François Sérvanin (France) Laurent Ferrier (France) Franz Hummel	Porsche 934	Porsche 3.0L F6 turbo	**G**	160	Engine (13hr)
DNF	Gr.6; S 3.0	7	(France) Équipe Renault Elf	(France) Patrick Tambay (France) Jean-Pierre Jaussaud	Renault Alpine A442	Renault 1997cc V6 twin-turbo	**M**	158	Engine (12hr)
DNF	GTP	87	(France) B. Decure (private entrant)	(France) Bernard Decure (France) Jean-Luc Thérier (France) “Cochise” (Jacky Cauchy)	Alpine A310	Renault PRV 2.7L V6	**M**	137	Engine (16hr)
DNF	Gr.4; GT	60	(Switzerland) Schiller Racing	(Switzerland) Claude Haldi (Switzerland) Florian Vetsch (Switzerland) Angelo Pallavicino	Porsche 934	Porsche 3.0L F6 turbo	**G**	123	Engine (10hr)
DNF	Gr.4; GT	57	(Luxembourg) N. Koob (private entrant)	(Luxembourg) Nicolas Koob (Belgium) Willy Braillard (Ecuador) Guillermo Ortega	Porsche 934	Porsche 3.0L F6 turbo	**D**	116	Engine (14hr)
DNF	Gr.4; GT	55	(Spain) Escuderia Montjuich	(Spain) Juan Fernández (Spain) Eugenio Baturone (Spain) Raphael Tarradas	Porsche 934	Porsche 3.0L F6 turbo	?	115	Lost wheel (10hr)
DNF	Gr.6; S 2.0	14	(France) D.Broudy (private entrant)	(France) Xavier Lapeyre (France) Patrick Perrier	Lola T286	Cosworth DFV 3.0L V8	**G**	104	Engine (11hr)
DNF	Gr.6; S 2.0	29	(Italy) Osella Squadra Corse	(France) Alain Cudini (France) Raymond Touroul (Italy) Anna Cambiaghi	Osella PA5	BMW M12 1993cc S4	**G**	100	Transmission (9hr)
DNF	Gr.4; GT	63	(France) J. Laplacette (private entrant)	(France) Joël Laplacette (France) Yves Courage (France) "Ségolen" (André Gahinet)	Porsche 911 Carrera	Porsche 3.0L F6	**M**	100	Engine (14hr)
DNF	Gr.6; S 2.0	32	(Switzerland) Cheetah Racing Cars (Switzerland) A. Chevalley	(Switzerland) André Chevalley (France) François Trisconi (United States) Wink Bancroft	Cheetah G-501	Cosworth BDG 1975c S4	**G**	93	Gearbox (8hr)
DNF	Gr.5; SP	48	(France) T. Perrier (private entrant)	(France) Thierry Perrier (France) Jean Belliard	Porsche 911 Carrera	Porsche 3.0L F6	**D**	90	Engine (10hr)
DSQ	GTP	85	(France) WM AEREM	(France) Marc Sourd (France) Xavier Mathiot	WM P77	Peugeot PRV 2.7L V6 twin-turbo	**M**	90	Insufficient distance (14hr)
DNF	Gr.5; SP	49	(France) H. Striebig (private entrant) / BP	(France) Hubert Striebig (France) Guy Chasseuil (West Germany) Helmut Kirchoffer	Porsche 934/5	Porsche 3.2L F6 turbo	**D**	65	Fuel pump (4hr)
DNF	Gr.6; S 3.0	11	(United States) Grand Touring Cars Inc	(United States) Sam Posey (France) Michel Leclère	Mirage M8	Renault 1997cc V6 turbo	**G**	58	Engine (4hr)
DNF	Gr.5; SP	41	(West Germany) Martini Racing Porsche System	(West Germany) Rolf Stommelen (Liechtenstein) Manfred Schurti	Porsche 935-77	Porsche Type-935 2.9L F6 twin-turbo	**D**	52	Engine (4hr)
DNF	Gr.4; GT	62	(France) G. Bourdillat (private entrant)	(France) Georges Bourdillat (France) Bruno Sotty (France) Alain-Michel Bernhard	Porsche 911 Carrera	Porsche 3.0L F6	?	52	Engine (5hr)
DNF	IMSA; GT	72	(Belgium) Luigi Racing	(United Kingdom) Tom Walkinshaw (Belgium) Eddy Joosen (Belgium) Claude de Wael	BMW 3.0 CSL	BMW M30 3.2L S6	**D**	46	Engine (4hr)
DNF	Gr.6; S 3.0	3	(West Germany) Martini Racing Porsche System	(Belgium) Jacky Ickx (France) Henri Pescarolo	Porsche 936-77	Porsche 911/78 2.1L F6 twin-turbo	**D**	45	Engine (3hr)
DNF	GTP	89	(France) Team Esso Aseptogyl	(France) Christine Dacremont (France) Marianne Hoepfner	Lancia Stratos Turbo	Ferrari 2.4L V6 turbo	**M**	37	Engine (4hr)
DNF	IMSA; GT	76	(France) Garage du Bac (France) Jean-Claude Giroix (private entrant)	(France) "Dépnic" (Jean-Claude Depince) (France) Jacques Coulon	BMW 3.0 CSL	BMW M30 3.2L S6	**D**	28	Electrics (4hr)
DNF	Gr.6; S 2.0	28	(France) J.-M. Lemerle (private entrant)	(France) Jean-Marie Lemerle (France) Alain Levié (France) Pierre-François Rousselot	Lola T294	Simca-ROC 1996cc S4	**G**	27	Fuel pump (4hr)
DNF	Gr.6; S 2.0	22	(United Kingdom) Chandler IBEC (United Kingdom) Team Lloyd's	(United Kingdom) Tony Charnell (United Kingdom) Ian Bracey (United Kingdom) John Hine (United Kingdom) Robin Smith	Chevron B31	Cosworth FVD 1985cc S4	**G**	21	Gearbox (4hr)
DNF	Gr.6; S 2.0	30	(Switzerland) GVEA (Switzerland) Écurie Rolloise	(Switzerland) Georges Morand (Switzerland) Christian Blanc (France) Fréderic Alliot	Lola T296	Cosworth BDG 1992cc S4	**G**	19	Engine (2hr)
DNF	Gr.5; SP	38	(West Germany) Gelo Racing Team	(West Germany) Klaus Ludwig (Netherlands) Toine Hezemans (West Germany) Hans Heyer	Porsche 935	Porsche Type-935 2.9L F6 turbo	**G**	15	Engine (1hr)
DNF	Gr.5; SP	42	(West Germany) Porsche Kremer Racing	(United Kingdom) John Fitzpatrick (United Kingdom) Guy Edwards (United Kingdom) Nick Faure	Porsche 935 K2	Porsche Type-935 2.9L F6 turbo	**G**	15	Turbo (1hr)
DNF	Gr.6; S 3.0	16	(France) J. Haran / H. de Chaunac (private entrant)	(France) Didier Pironi (France) René Arnoux (France) Guy Fréquelin	Renault Alpine A442	Renault 1997cc V6 twin-turbo	**M**	0	Fire (1hr)

=== Did Not Start ===
Pos	Class	No	Team	Drivers	Chassis	Engine	Tyre	Reason
DNQ	Gr.6; S 3.0	6	(United Kingdom) A. de Cadenet (private entrant)	(United Kingdom) Simon Phillips (United Kingdom) Richard Bond (United Kingdom) Tony Birchenhough	De Cadenet-Lola T380	Cosworth DFV 3.0L V8	**G**	Did not qualify
DNQ	Gr.6; S 2.0	20	(France) D. Brillat (private entrant) (France) Seymaz Racing	(France) Daniel Brillat (France) Eric Vuagnat (Switzerland) Sandro Plastina	Cheetah G-601	BMW M12 1998cc S4	**G**	Accident
DNQ	Gr.6; S 2.0	27	(France) Société Racing Organisation; Course	(France) Fred Stalder (France) Jacky Haran (France) Jean-Louis Bos	Chevron B36	Simca-ROC 1996cc S4	**G**	Did not qualify
DNQ	Gr.5; SP	43	(France) L. Meznarie (private entrant)	(France) Thierry Sabine (France) Jean Bélin	Porsche 911 Carrera RSR	Porsche 3.2L F6	**D**	Did not qualify
DNQ	Gr.4; GT	66	(France) "Ségolen"	(France) "Ségolen" (André Gahinet) (France) Christian Bussi	Porsche 934	Porsche 3.0L F6 turbo	**M**	Did not qualify
DNQ	IMSA; GT	73	(France) M. Ouviére (private entrant)	(France) Roger Dorchy (France) Philippe Streiff (France) Philippe Jaffrenou	Porsche 911 Carrera RS	Porsche 3.0L F6	**M**	Did not qualify
DNA	GTP	84	(France) J.-L. Chateau (private entrant)	(France) Jean-Louis Chateau (France) Jean-Marie Tranchant	Porsche 935	Porsche Type-935 3.0L F6 turbo	**D**	Not all drivers qualified
DNA	Gr.4; GT	67	(Italy) Scuderia Jolly Club	(Italy) Anna Cambiaghi (Italy) Emilio Paleari	Lancia Stratos HF	Ferrari 2.4L V6	?	Did not arrive

=== Class Winners ===
Class	Winning car	Winning drivers
Group 6 S Sports 3-litre	#4 Porsche 936	Barth / Haywood / Ickx
Group 6 S Sports 2-litre	#26 Chevron B36	Pignard / Dufrène / Henry *
Group 5 SP Special Production	#40 Porsche 935	Ballot-Léna / Gregg
Group 4 GTS Special GT	#58 Porsche 934	Wollek / “Steve” / Gurdjian *
GTP Le Mans GT Prototype	#88 Inaltéra LM77	Rondeau / Ragnotti *
GTX Le Mans GT Experimental	no finishers	
IMSA GT	#71 BMW 3.0 CSL	Dieudonné / Xhenceval / Dini *

- Note: setting a new class distance record.

=== Index of Energy Efficiency ===
Pos	Class	No	Team	Drivers	Chassis	Score
1	Gr.6; S 2.0	26	(France) Société Racing Organisation; Course	(France) Michel Pignard (France) Albert Dufrène (France) Jacques Henry	Chevron B36	0.96
2	Gr.6; S 3.0	4	(West Germany) Martini Racing Porsche System	(West Germany) Jürgen Barth (United States) Hurley Haywood (Belgium) Jacky Ickx	Porsche 936-77	0.90
3	IMSA; GT	61	(France) C. Gouttepifre (private entrant)	(France) Christian Gouttepifre (France) Philippe Malbran (France) Alain Leroux	Porsche 911 Carrera RS	0.78
4	IMSA; GT	50	(France) H. Poulain (private entrant)	(France) Hervé Poulain (France) Marcel Mignot	BMW 320i	0.75
5	GTP	88	(France) Inaltéra	(France) Jean Rondeau (France) Jean Ragnotti	Inaltéra LM77	0.74
6	GTP	86	(France) WM AEREM	(France) Max Mamers (France) Jean-Daniel Raulet	WM P76	0.74
7	Gr.6; S 3.0	5	(United Kingdom) A. de Cadenet (private entrant)	(United Kingdom) Alain de Cadenet (United Kingdom) Chris Craft	De Cadenet-Lola LM77	0.73
8	Gr.5; SP	40	(France) JMS Racing (France) ASA Cachia	(France) Claude Ballot-Léna (United States) Peter Gregg	Porsche 935	0.64
9	IMSA; GT	71	(Belgium) Luigi Racing	(Belgium) Pierre Dieudonné (Belgium) Jean Xhenceval (Italy) Spartaco Dini	BMW 3.0 CSL	0.61
10	Gr.6; S 3.0	10	(United States) Grand Touring Cars Inc	(Australia) Vern Schuppan (France) Jean-Pierre Jarier	Mirage M8	0.59

- Note: Only the top ten positions are included in this set of standings.

=== Statistics ===
Taken from Quentin Spurring's book, officially licensed by the ACO

- Fastest Lap in practice –J.-P. Jabouille, #9 Renault-Alpine A442 – 3:31.7secs; 230.43 km/h (143.18 mph)
- Fastest Lap – J. Ickx, #4 Porsche 936-77 – 3:36.5secs; 226.81 km/h (140.93 mph)
- Winning Distance – 4,671.83 km (2,902.94 mi)
- Winner's Average Speed – 194.67 km/h (120.96 mph)
- Attendance – 170000

Citations
