= 1979 24 Hours of Le Mans =

47th 24 Hours of Le Mans endurance race

Previous: 1978	Next: 1980
Index: Races | Winners

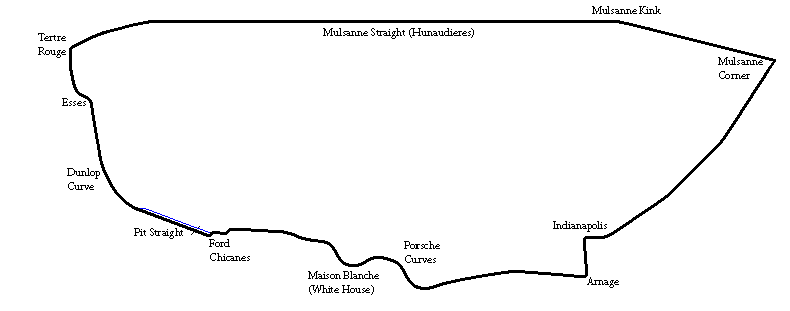
Le Mans in 1979

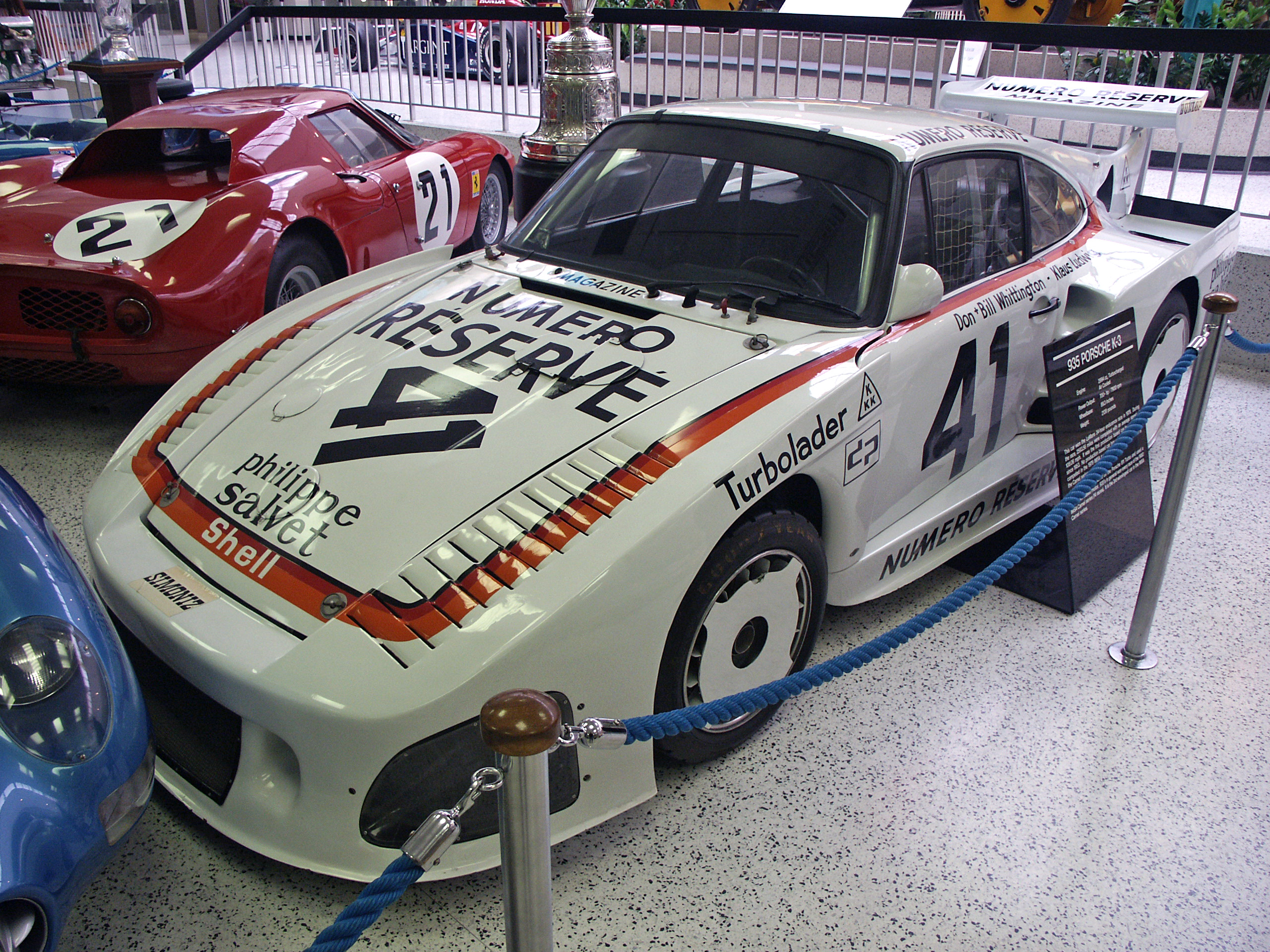
The winning Porsche 935 of Kremer Racing

The 1979 24 Hours of Le Mans was the 47th Grand Prix of Endurance, and took place on 9 and 10 June 1979. With no other major works cars this year, the Porsche team were the strong favourites to win. Their competition would be from Cosworth-powered Mirages and Rondeaus and a swarm of Group 5 and IMSA-class Porsche 935s. The other big talking point was the presence of Hollywood actor Paul Newman, driving for Dick Barbour Racing.

However, the Porsche 936s ran into problems early, as did the Mirages that inherited the lead. The race became a duel between the 935s of the rival teams from Cologne: Kremer Racing and Gelo Sportswear. Soon after midnight, heavy storms started sweeping the circuit. The rain stayed for virtually the rest of the race, dramatically slowing the pace, negating the speed of the 936s coming back through the field. Both Gelo cars retired with mechanical issues in the soggy dawn, and when the Wollek/Haywood Porsche developed a bad misfire soon after it looked like the Kremer 935 of Klaus Ludwig and the Whittington brothers had the race covered. They had a 13-lap lead over the Dick Barbour Porsche.

Then approaching 11am Don Whittington came to a stop on the Mulsanne Straight with a broken drivebelt. It took 80 minutes to get back to the pits, and by the time they got back into the race their lead was down to four laps. But the charging American team were foiled by a faulty wheel-nut taking 23 minutes to fix. Then in the last hour, the car slowed with a bad misfire. Stommelen pulled up just before the finish line and waited for the Kremer car to take the flag in victory. The Kremer brothers' finest hour was sealed with their other team-car coming home in third.

Porsche finished 1-2-3-4, and the Kremer 935-K3 was the first Le Mans win by a rear-engined car. The torrential rain in the second half of the race made it the slowest Le Mans since 1958.

== Regulations ==
In April 1978, the sports regulatory body, the CSI, was overhauled and replaced by the new international racing organisation FISA. The World Championship for Makes was revised to include both Group 5 and Group 6 racecars again, split into two categories: over and under 2-litres. FISA President, Jean-Marie Balestre was committed to bringing Le Mans back into the World Championship, but for now the Automobile Club de l'Ouest (ACO) chose to remain independent.

A change to the circuit was forced upon the ACO this year. Construction of the city's ring-road system meant the second Dunlop Bridge at the Tertre Rouge corner had to be demolished. The right-hand corner that led onto the Hunaudières straight was eased into a faster double-apex corner, shortening the overall circuit length by 14 metres (46 feet) to 13.63 km. The only other change was to move the start-time forward two hours, to 2pm in Saturday, to allow the spectators more time on Sunday afternoon to vote in the first European parliament elections.

A new efficiency calculation was used this year – the Index of Fuel Consumption. The total fuel used was measured as at the final pit-stop and then gauged against the cars' total distance covered, as litres per 100 kilometres. It was not exact, as no account was taken of the remaining fuel in the tanks after the race, expecting no team would fill in way too much fuel, or not enough.

== Entries ==
The ACO received 87 applications, from which 60 were accepted to qualify for the 55 starting spots. Porsche was the only manufacturer with a works team and made up 19 of the 55 starters. Entries again came from regular specialists Mirage, De Cadenet, Rondeau and WM. There were also exploratory entries from Formula 1 constructor March and the Japanese companies of Mazda and Dome.

Class	Large-engines >2.0L classes	Medium-engines < 2.0L classes	Turbo engines
Group 6 S Sports	13 / 12	16 / 14	2 / 0
Group 5 SP Special Production	9 / 9	-	8
Group 4 GTS Special GT	5 / 4	-	5
GTP Le Mans GT Prototype	5 / 5	-	4
IMSA GTX IMSA/Le Mans GT Experimental	11 / 11	1 / 0	6 / 0
Total Entries	43 / 41	17 / 14	25

- Note: The first number is the number of arrivals, the second the number who started.

=== Group 6 and GTP ===
The absence of the defending winners, Renault Alpine, made the Porsche works team strong favourites for the race win. They were now sponsored by the American oil tycoon David Thieme's Essex Petroleum. The 1978 iterations of the Porsche 936 were rebuilt on two chassis that had both been coincidentally crashed by Jochen Mass. The cars were essentially unchanged although the gearbox was strengthened after last year's woes. This year, their talismanic driver Jacky Ickx was paired with Brian Redman. The pair had driven together at the previous year's Spa 24 Hours. Ickx had just returned from Canada where he had won the Can-Am race. The second car had team regular Hurley Haywood with Bob Wollek, who had been released for the race from his regular seat with Georg Loos as a late replacement for Didier Pironi.

Porsche's competition in Group 6 would all be equipped with the Ford-Cosworth DFV engine. Mirage felt they had a genuine chance of victory this year. They were unable to renew the engine deal they had had for two years with Renault and instead reverted to its reliable workhorse, the Cosworth engine. It helped entice the sponsorship of a consortium of 250 Ford-dealerships in France. The new M10 cars sported a new streamlined, long-tail spyder bodywork, with a 20% smaller frontal area. Team driver Vern Schuppan was paired with Renault winner Jean-Pierre Jaussaud, while veteran British endurance drivers Derek Bell and David Hobbs shared the second car.

Dome Company had first appeared in Europe at the 1978 Geneva Motor Show with a road prototype. A racing version of the Dome Zero was entered. The distinctive low, angular wedge-shaped design came from Masao Ono who had worked on the Maki Formula One project. It was developed in England by a team led by former De Cadenet team manager Keith Greene. Two cars were built, with the original tested at the Fuji Speedway then debuted at the World Championship round at Silverstone It was driven by Chris Craft (also from De Cadenet) and Gordon Spice. They were joined at Le Mans by Bob Evans and former Maki driver Tony Trimmer. André Chevalley had bought and raced the Inaltéra GTP the previous year. This year he entered two Lola Type T286 cars. Alain de Cadenet continued his personal development of the Lola T380. The new LM78 now had a wider, longer chassis to improve road-holding. Having lost his regular co-driver Chris Craft to the Dome team, De Cadenet now got local Le Mans professional François Migault in his stead. This year the car was finished in time to compete at the Silverstone round, where they finished an excellent second. Two of his earlier cars were also entered by their British owners: Peter Lovett's JC Racing and Simon Phillips.

Once again, Jean Rondeau hedged his bets by entering his cars in both the Group 6 and GTP classes. The three new cars had improved aerodynamics and suspension with Cosworths tuned by Swiss engine-specialist Heini Mader. Rondeau attracted veteran French drivers Henri Pescarolo and Jean-Pierre Beltoise for one car, and rally specialists Jean Ragnotti and Bernard Darniche, while he himself raced the GTP entry with Jacky Haran. The other French team in GTP, Welter Racing also had a new design. The P79 refined the aerodynamic shell and kept developing the 2.7-litre Peugeot V6 engine, now with twin KKK (Kühnle, Kopp & Kausch) turbos. Three cars were ready for Le Mans, with all-French crews.

The most curious entry in Group 6 was a lavish project from March Engineering, who had been working with BMW in Formula Two. The silhouette design by John Gentry was based on the BMW M1, but as less than 400 cars had yet been built, it could not run in Group 5, nor would IMSA allow it into the GTX category. GTP rules required all four wheels be the same size, whereas this car had 16" fronts and 19" rears. In the end, it got special dispensation from the FIA to run in Group 6, in the 5-litre class normally used for American V8 engines. The car would be raced by BMW works driver Dieter Quester, alongside Ian Grob and Guy Edwards who had paired up last year with the disappointing Ibec project.

=== Group 6 (2-litre) ===
Once again, there was a big field for the 2-litre category with fifteen entries, dominated as usual by Lola and Chevron, and using a mix of ROC, Cosworth or BMW engines. The French engine-builder team, Société ROC, had three of the B36. Another Chevron (with a Brian Hart-prepared Cosworth engine) was entered by the Scottish Mogil Motors team of Tony Charnell, Robin Smith and Richard Jones. The six Lolas were equipped with ROC, Cosworth and BMW engines – with the French Lambretta team with both a BMW and a ROC-engined car entered. The Lola-Ford of the Dorset Racing team had a special Cosworth BDX engine, developed by their local Swindon Racing Engines. Team-owners Tony Birchenhough and Brian Joscelyne were joined by Richard Jenvey and Nick Mason. The latter was the other big-name celebrity in the race, as the drummer for British band Pink Floyd (and avid Ferrari collector), though his status was overshadowed by Paul Newman. For several seasons, Jörg Obermoser had shown success with his ToJ cars in Europe, yet this was the first year they were seen at Le Mans with Frenchman Hubert Striebig entering his BMW-powered SC206, partnered with Alain Cudini and Hughes Kirschoffer.

=== Group 5 and IMSA GTX ===
The Porsche works team had finished its development of the Porsche 935, leaving its representation in Group 5 and IMSA to their customer teams of which there were now many. The car was dominating the respective championships. The differences between the Group 5 and IMSA cars were slight, aside from drawing European teams to Group 5 and North American teams following IMSA. Although the cars were more powerful, their smaller tanks meant they would need more fuel stops, with only about 50–60 minutes endurance.

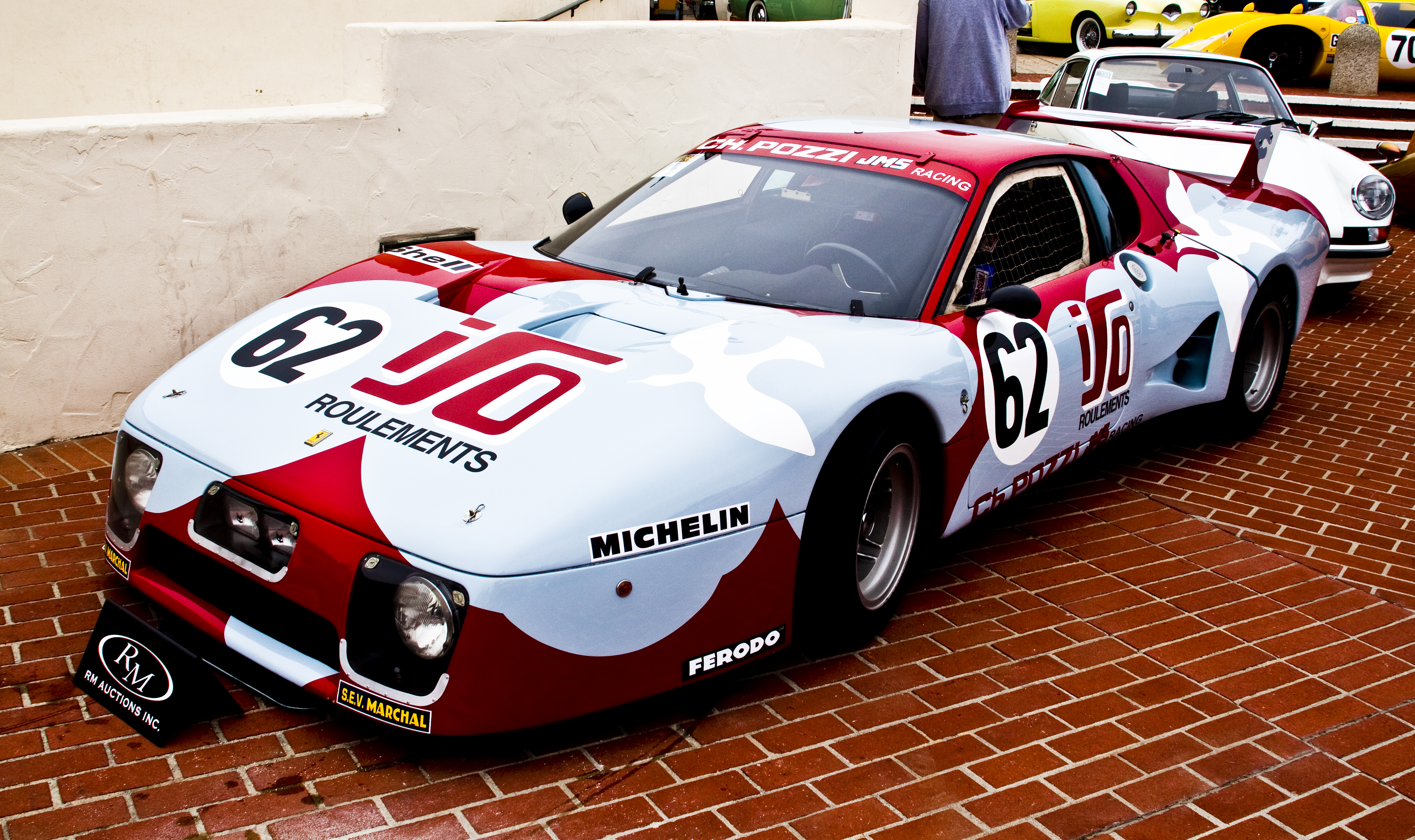
Ferrari 512 BB of Pozzi Racing

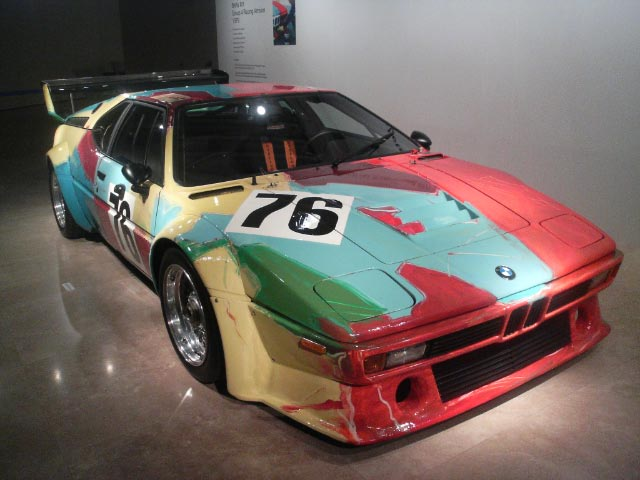
BMW M1 hand-painted by Andy Warhol

The Kremer brothers had made over 100 modifications to the standard 935-77 model in developing their next iteration, the 935-K3. Using panels made of composite materials they took off 30 kg (66 lb) weight, and tweaked the body-shell, mostly made of kevlar, with their own aerodynamic refinements. The 3-litre engine was fitted with twin-turbos that could put out 740 bhp, right up to a massive 800 bhp on maximum boost. They were also fitted with an air-air intercooler, unlike the air-water variety on the regular 935. Kremer Racing entered three cars: two of the new K3s for team leader Klaus Ludwig, joined by the wealthy Whittington brothers (Don and Bill), former motocross riders from Florida in one, and DRM regulars Axel Plankenhorn and "John Winter", with Philippe Gurdjian in the other. They also had a standard 935 for Laurent Ferrier/François Sérvanin/ François Trisconi. The Whittington brothers had also entered their own 935 in the IMSA class but then cancelled that entry.

The dominant team of the season had been the Gelo Sportswear team of Georg Loos. His cars had won three of the five rounds and second in another. Despite two of his winning drivers, Ickx and Wollek, being called into the works team, the two cars still had strong driver line-ups: Manfred Schurti/Hans Heyer in one and John Fitzpatrick/Harald Grohs/Jean-Louis Lafosse in the other. Alongside these premier teams were four other entries: Porsche 935s of the French ASA Cachia team, Swiss privateer Claude Haldi and German Sekurit team and the return of a De Tomaso Pantera, run by the Italian Carlo Pietromarchi.

Dick Barbour returned to Le Mans, this year with four Porsche 935s set up to the IMSA specifications, including one of the 1979 twin-turbo models. In a major publicity coup he scored two big signings as drivers: Rolf Stommelen was not needed by the Porsche works team this year. The other was the 54-year old actor Paul Newman, one of the biggest names in Hollywood of the time and nicknamed Cool Hand Luke after his character in the 1967 film. Newman was no mere gentleman driver; he gained an interest in motorsports while taking driving courses under former Le Mans pilot Bob Bondurant for his role in the 1969 film Winning, eventually winning multiple class championships in the amateur SCCA circuit. Barbour's second car had the Sebring-winning trio of Bob Akin, Rob McFarlin and Roy Woods Two other 935s were in the IMSA class: a privateer effort from Formula 1 driver Jean-Pierre Jarier and Ted Field's Interscope team who had, with Danny Ongais and Hurley Haywood, won the Daytona 24 hours earlier in the year.

Ferrari's Gestione Sportiva (racing division) had now developed a proper lightened, racing version of the 512 BB for its customer teams. However, at Daytona it had shown diabolical handling. It was fitted with a lengthened streamlined body designed by Pininfarina. The 5-litre flat-12 engine got fuel-injection and was tuned to now put out 480 bhp. But this was 200 bhp less than the rival Porsche 935, which was also around 150 kg lighter. Five such cars were entered for Le Mans – two each for Charles Pozzi's French team, and Luigi Chinetti's North American Racing Team, while the Belgian Ecurie Francorchamps prepared one for their regular driver Jean Blaton, who raced under the pseudonym "Beurlys".

Hervé Poulain, French art-auctioneer, had presented the world with a successive series of BMW Art Cars at Le Mans. This year he had the BMW M1, entered in the IMSA class and he had his car painted by American pop artist Andy Warhol. After production difficulties, it was in production and had finally been homologated. The 3.5-litre engine was fuel-injected and could put out 470 bhp. The model had debuted at the Nürburgring in April and started in the races of the new one-make Procar series. With a special exhaust and plastic rear window, the car had to run in the IMSA class. Poulain had the services of works driver Manfred Winkelhock, along with Marcel Mignot.

Mazda had been competing successfully in the IMSA GTU category, with their new RX-7 and Yojiro Terada getting a class victory at Daytona. An RX-3 had entered the 1975 race run by privateer Claude Buchet. This year, Mazda sent its RX-7 to Le Mans, but with only a single IMSA class it was set against the far more powerful Porsches and Ferraris. The drivers were Terada, Buchet and Tetsu Ikuzawa.

=== Group 4 GT ===
The Group 4 class had a smaller field of just six entries, all of which were privateer teams running the 3-litre turbocharged Porsche 934. They comprised three French, two Swiss and a German team. Last year's class-winner Anne-Charlotte Verney had taken the opportunity to upgrade from the 911 Carrera, and had rally driver René Metge as one of her co-drivers. The Swiss Lubrifilm team had hired the experienced veteran Herbert Müller.

== Practice and Qualifying ==
As was expected, the two Porsche 936s comfortably put in the fastest times to claim the first two places on the grid. Bob Wollek set the fastest time, 3:30.1, on Wednesday but the next lap had a tyre blow-out at top speed on the Hunaudières Straight. It was a very similar incident to what had happened to Jochen Mass at the Silverstone race, the previous month. Ickx recorded his time of 3:31.4 on Thursday before Brian Redman missed a gear-change and over-revved the engine, forcing the mechanics to do an engine-change before the race. Modified wheel rims, fashioned overnight at Porsche's factory at Weissach, were also fitted to both cars as insurance against further sudden punctures.

Third quickest was Klaus Ludwig in the Kremer K3. His time of 3:34.6 was actually faster than Stommelen got in the "Moby Dick" works 935 the previous year (3:39.3). He was two seconds faster than the rival Gelo Porsche of Manfred Schurti, that had also needed a full engine change. Fifth was Schuppan's Mirage from Ragnotti's Rondeau. Stommelen had the fastest IMSA lap, of 3:49.8, to qualify 16th, with Jarier second fastest in 21st (3:55.7). The fastest Ferrari was the Ballot-Léna/Gregg/Leclère Pozzi car well back in 28th (4:00.8). They were just ahead of the leading 2-litre Group 6 of the ROC Chevron (4:01.3). Last car on the grid was the underwhelming Aston Martin with a sluggish 4:24.5.

The slowest qualifiers of each class would be culled from the starting grid. Not surprisingly, the heavy March-BMW failed – Guy Edwards' best lap (3:59.4) was almost 30 seconds slower than the pole-time, and eight seconds outside the 110% rule. The Mazda RX-7, despite being 5 seconds faster than the Aston Martin, also fell afoul of that rule, as slowest in the IMSA class.

== Race ==
=== Start ===
Although the week had been cloudy, race-day was sunny and hot, attracting a big crowd for the 2pm start. Pescarolo did not even complete the formation lap, having to pit the Rondeau with low fuel-pressure and starting from the pit-line at the back of the field. From the start, the two Porsche 936s took the lead in formation. At the end of the first lap, Ickx led the pair, already with a ten-second jump on Ludwig and the rest of the field. By lap 3, the two Mirages had moved up to third and fourth ahead of the 935s. At the first pit-stops Ickx was delayed when the new wheel-rims had to be changed because they were locking against the brake callipers. This gave Wollek a good lead. The British cars had a terrible start from sloppy preparation: De Cadenet's car pitted after just six laps: mechanics had omitted to drill a hole in the pinion to let oil reach the bearing, which caused the gearbox to quickly seize solid. Craft had the Dome running seventh on the first lap, but pitted next time around with a fire caused by a distributor lead that had not been properly attached. After losing seven laps, they ran out of petrol at Mulsanne because of a faulty fuel-pump. By saving fuel, the other Dome had got into fifth, but were then thwarted at the first stops with a blown head-gasket.

After two hours, Wollek led Ickx by eighty seconds, with Bell a further fifty seconds back. Schuppan was a lap back in fourth and the 935s of Ludwig, Fitzpatrick, Schurti and Plankenhorn a further lap back with the Rondeau of Pescarolo. Just after Redman had taken over for his first stint, he got a puncture at the Dunlop curve. He spun the car to avoid the barriers, but had to crawl round most of a lap on the rim to get back to the pits where almost an hour was lost repairing the heavy damage to bodywork and one of the radiators. They resumed 17 laps down. At the same time, Jaussaud found his Mirage gearbox full of neutrals and was marooned out on the circuit. A mechanic was sent out to shout instructions and Jaussaud was able to fashion repairs to jam the second-gear cog into position to get back to the pits. Rebuilding the gearbox took four hours, and despite hard driving by Jaussaud and Hobbs, niggly issues meant they missed the minimum distance at half-time by three laps and were disqualified. In the fourth hour, the Wollek/Haywood car started to misfire badly. Losing a half-hour, it took 4 stops and 8 laps, in the pits replacing the fuel-injection pump and filter to solve the problem. This put the Bell/Hobbs Mirage into the lead (despite not having a first gear). Now joined by Schuppan they held the lead for a further three hours, until just before nightfall, until the perennial vibration issues of the Cosworth DFV caused exhaust problems, costing a half-hour in the pits.

With the demise and delay of the Group 6 cars, this left the lead to be contested between the 935s of the Gelo team and the Ludwig/Whittingtons Kremer K3. The other Kremer car, of Plankenhorn, "Winter" and Gurdjian was running fourth. But at the 8pm pit-stops, spilt fuel ignited and exploded with such force that it blew the engine cover off the car. Only the bravery of a fire marshal prevented greater damage. Once repaired they were able to rejoin the race.

=== Night ===
All through the night, the two Cologne teams battled for the lead, while the IMSA-leading 935 of Dick Barbour was further back in fourth. The worst accident of the race happened soon after 10pm, when Marc Sourd in the ROC Chevron crashed at the new Tertre Rouge corner. Although the driver was uninjured, a flag marshal was taken to hospital in a serious condition. Late on Saturday night, Schuppan had a narrow escape in the remaining Mirage. It was suffering an over-charging alternator that suddenly shorted out the headlights. This happened as he was coming through the quick Porsche Curves. Clipping the barriers on both sides of the road he was lucky the damage to the back end was light, but 50 minutes was lost repairing it. The electrical issue remained a potential problem again throughout the night, although the drivers pressed on hard.

The two 936s were the fastest cars on the track and quickly moving back up through the field. At midnight, after ten hours, the Gelo Porsches of Schurti and Fitzpatrick sandwiched the Kremer 935. Wollek was fourth ahead of a pack of 935s: the IMSA cars of Barbour and Interscope, then the other Kremer, Haldi and Sekurit cars. The leading Pozzi Ferrari (of Ballot-Léna/Gregg/Leclère) rounded out the top-10. Herbie Müller's 934 had run like clockwork and was sitting in 13th. The Mamers/Raulet WM led GTP, running 16th while the Mogil Chevron was fighting the Lambretta Lola for the lead of the 2-litre Group 6. Then soon after midnight the clear weather of Saturday gave way to drizzle, then torrential rain that lasted all night dramatically slowing the race pace.

By half-time Wollek and Haywood were back up to third while Ickx/Redman were seventh. Jacky Ickx came to a stop on the circuit when his car broke its drivebelt. In the darkness he installed the spare belt incorrectly. A mechanic sent out with another one was spotted by officials throwing it across the track and they were disqualified for receiving outside assistance.

The Gelo Porsches stopped soon after 4am, within minutes of each other when they were running second and fourth. Firstly Fitzpatrick suffered a spectacular turbo fire in the engine that lit up the pits. The damage was repairable until an over-exuberant fire marshal smothered the engine with foam. Then less than a quarter hour later, Schurti was in the pits with an engine failure.

=== Morning ===
At 6am, as the soggy dawn tried to break through, the Kremer Porsche had got through the night with a sizeable lead over the Barbour car. The Porsche 936 was third ahead of three other 935s – of the Kremer, Haldi and Sekurit teams. Seventh was the BMW from the French ASA-Cachia Porsche. Ninth, having a very reliable run was the Lubrifilm Porsche 934 with a big lead in Group 4. The two Pozzi Ferraris were split by the stationery Ickx/Redman 936, then came the Belgian Ferrari and the recovering Rondeau of Ragnotti/Darniche in 14th.

By 7am, the Wollek/Haywood car got back up to second but was then stopped by engine problems. Although it got going again, its race was done and it would retire two hours later after many more pitstops. This left the Kremer Porsche with a clear 13-lap lead over the Dick Barbour car. At 7.50am, the Leclère Ferrari (running 3rd in class behind its Pozzi teammate in 10th) collided with one of the ROC Chevrons braking for Mulsanne corner. The 2-litre was turfed over the barrier and the Ferrari was also too damaged to continue though neither driver was injured. Ninety minutes later, the other Pozzi car, running sixth overall, ruined its radiators and gearbox running over debris and going off-road to avoid a spinning car. After losing a cylinder in the third hour, the BMW had steadily made up places as others fell around them. After getting through the worst of the rain they were in seventh until halted for over an hour to repair the clutch, dropping them back to fourteenth.

What could have been an easy cruise to the finish for the Kremer team was abruptly curtailed at 10.40am when Don Whittington came to a stop on the Hunaudières straight. The toothed fuel-pump drivebelt had come off. He carried a spare on-board but could not fit it. Surprising the pit-crew, he managed to fashion a repair with the spare alternator belt instead and crawl back to the pits. But that had all taken 80 minutes, then another 15 for the repairs. With the lead down to just four laps and a damaged car, they got back on the track soon after noon.

=== Finish and post-race ===
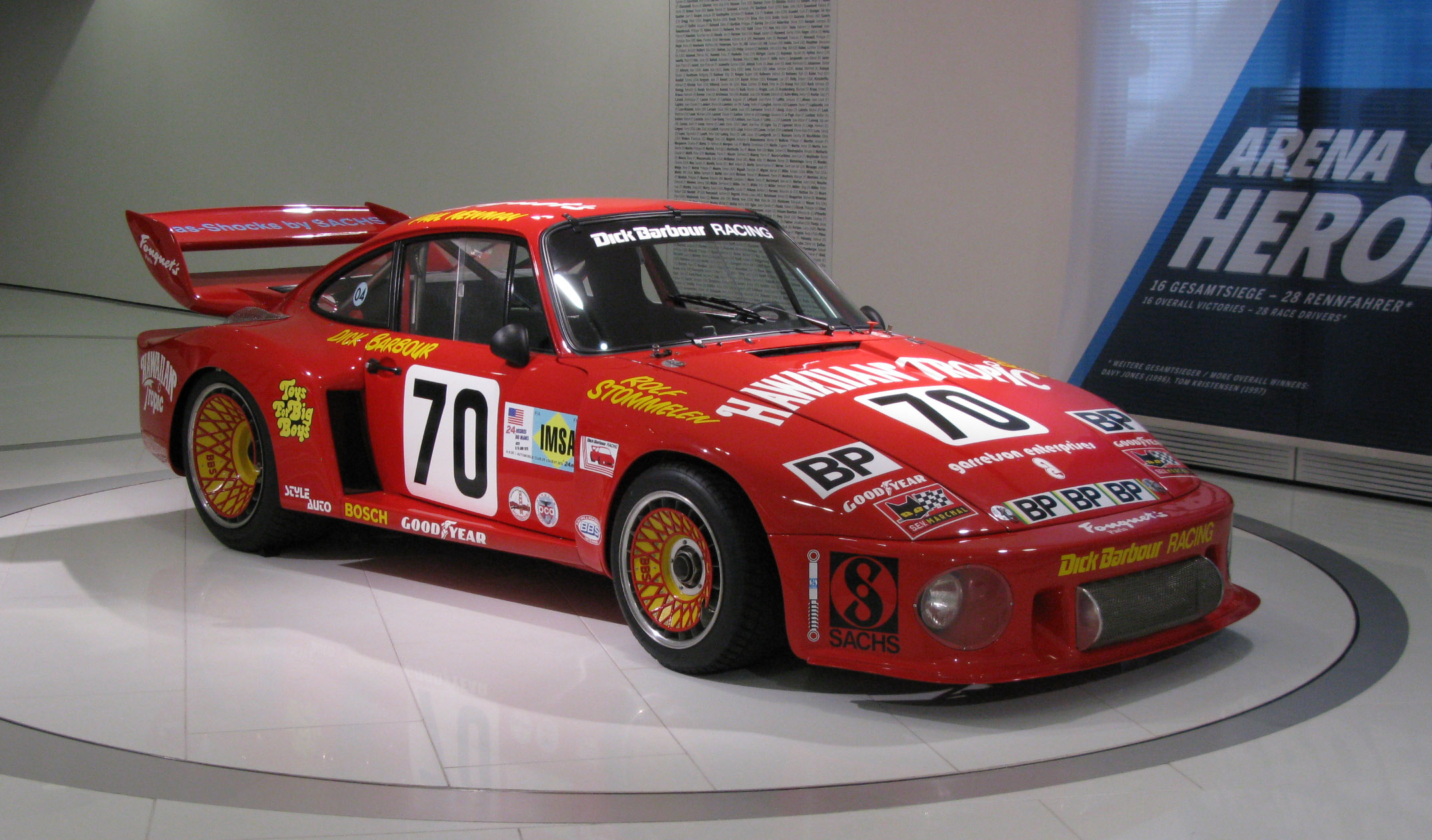
2nd-placed Dick Barbour Porsche 935

An improbable Hollywood ending for Newman was on the cards until the team was foiled by an intransigent wheel-nut locking tight, forcing it to be sawn off and a complete hub replacement, taking 23 minutes (6 laps). Stommelen pushed hard but then with just 20 minutes to go, he slowed dramatically with a bad misfire. Finally defeated by a holed piston, he crept round for two more painful laps until pulling up just before the finish line. Being sure to keep his engine running to avoid disqualification, he waited for the Kremer car to come past and take the flag before inching over the line to take second.

The second K3, having driven back up the field to eighth after its engine fire was unlucky to have a driveshaft fail in the last hours that dropped them down to finish 13th. However, the third team car, of Ferrier/Servanin/Trisconi kept up its reliable run to finish third, capping an excellent weekend for the Kremer team. Fourth, after its own metronomic run was the Group 4 Porsche of Herbie Müller and the Swiss Lubrifilm team. Finishing just a lap off the podium it won its class by an enormous 31 laps.

The remaining Mirage had been struggling with water getting into the electrics throughout the latter half of the race. With less than an hour to go, at its last pitstop, the car refused to restart. For forty minutes the crew tried to get it going, as regulations stated every car had to only be started by onboard means. Horsman had (illegally) rigged up a slave battery and tried to disguise restarting the car but when Bell had the car stall on him going up the pitlane, they were out.

The Ragnotti/Darniche Rondeau finished fifth, winning the Group 6 class 13 laps ahead of team-mates Pescarolo/Beltoise who finished tenth. Both cars had been hampered throughout the latter half of the race with water getting into the electrics. Despite its trials and tribulations, the new BMW carried on to finish sixth. Winning the GTP category was the WM of Raulet/Mamers/Saulnier in 14th, just the second time one of their cars had finished. Once again the 2-litre Sports class was decimated by unreliability. The class winner, finishing 17th, was the Mogil Chevron-Cosworth of Charnell/Smith/Jones. They had endured wet electrics and a number of flat batteries. Four laps behind them was the Dorset Racing Lola of Birchenhough/Jenvey/Joscelyne/Mason. After initially losing an hour with a broken rocker arm it had run reliably. Third in the class (12 laps further back) was the surviving Lambretta Lola, that had been the early class-leader.

It was a triumph for the Whittington brothers in only their second year of professional racing. But as "Motor" magazine put on their headline, it was "the day the winner came second": the spectators' favourite, Paul Newman, had almost pulled it off and got the biggest ovation when he took the podium with his team-mates. The decade has started with one movie star making a film about the race and ended with another almost winning it. With the 935-K3, this was the first Le Mans won by a rear-engined car. This record capped a great race for Porsche – finishing 1-2-3-4, as Jaguar had done in 1957, and winning all four of the classes they had been represented in. The torrential rain in the second half of the race made it the slowest Le Mans since 1958; the total distance was down fully 17% on the previous year.

A month later, the next event of the World Championship was at Watkins Glen. After the lead changed hands 12 times over the 6 hours, it ended with the same result for the same drivers, with the Ludwig and the Whittington brothers again beating home the Barbour/Stommelen/Newman car. Overall, Klaus Ludwig had a very successful season with the Kremer Porsche, winning 11 of the 12 races it was entered in.

== Official results ==
=== Finishers ===
Results taken from Quentin Spurring's book, officially licensed by the ACO
Class Winners are in Bold text.

Pos	Class	No.	Team	Drivers	Chassis	Engine	Tyre	Laps
1	**Gr.5**; **SP**	**41**	**(West Germany) Porsche Kremer Racing**	**(West Germany) Klaus Ludwig** **(United States) Don Whittington** **(United States) Bill Whittington**	Porsche 935-K3	Porsche 930/79 3.0L F6 twin-turbo	D	306
2	**IMSA**; **GTX**	**70**	**(United States) Dick Barbour Racing**	**(United States) Dick Barbour** **(West Germany) Rolf Stommelen** **(United States) Paul Newman**	Porsche 935/77A	Porsche 930/80 3.0L F6 twin-turbo	G	299
3	Gr.5; SP	40	(West Germany) Porsche Kremer Racing	(France) Laurent Ferrier (France) François Servanin (France) François Trisconi	Porsche 935/77A	Porsche 930/72 3.0L F6 turbo	D	297
4	**Gr.4**; **GT**	**82**	**(Switzerland) Lubrifilm Racing Team**	**(Switzerland) Herbert Müller** **(Switzerland) Angelo Pallavicini** **(Switzerland) Marco Vanoli**	Porsche 934	Porsche 3.0L F6 turbo	G	296
5	**Gr.6**; **S 3.0**	**5**	**(France) J. Rondeau** (private entrant)	**(France) Jean Ragnotti** **(France) Bernard Darniche**	Rondeau M379	Cosworth DFV 3.0 L V8	G	292
6	IMSA; GTX	76	(France) H. Poulain (private entrant)	(France) Hervé Poulain (West Germany) Manfred Winkelhock (France) Marcel Mignot	BMW M1	BMW M88 3.5L S6	D	288
7	Gr.5; SP	42	(West Germany) Sekurit Racing (West Germany) Autohaus Max Moritz GmbH	(West Germany) Edgar Dören (West Germany) Dieter Schornstein (West Germany) Götz von Tschirnhaus	Porsche 935/77A	Porsche 3.0L F6 turbo	G	283
8	IMSA; GTX	72	(United States) Dick Barbour Racing	(United States) Bob Garretson (United States) Skeeter McKitterick (United States) Edwin Abate	Porsche 935/78	Porsche 3.0L F6 turbo	G	283
9	IMSA; GTX	73	(United States) Dick Barbour Racing (United States) Wynn's International	(United States) Bob Kirby (United States) Bob Harmon (United States) John Hotchkis	Porsche 935/78	Porsche 930/73 3.0L F6 turbo	G	280
10	Gr.6; S 3.0	4	(France) J. Rondeau (private entrant)	(France) Henri Pescarolo (France) Jean-Pierre Beltoise	Rondeau M379	Cosworth DFV 3.0L V8	G	279
11	Gr.5; SP	43	(Switzerland) C. Haldi (private entrant)	(Switzerland) Claude Haldi (Switzerland) Herbert Loewe (Panama) Rodrigo Terran	Porsche 935	Porsche 3.0L F6 turbo	D	275
12	IMSA; GTX	61	(Belgium) "Beurlys" (private entrant)	(Belgium) "Beurlys" (Jean Blaton) (United Kingdom) Nick Faure (United Kingdom) Steve O'Rourke (Belgium) Bernard de Dryver	Ferrari 512 BB-LM	Ferrari 4.9 L F12	M	274
13	Gr.5; SP	45	(West Germany) Porsche Kremer Racing	(West Germany) Axel Plankenhorn (France) Philippe Gurdjian (West Germany) "John Winter" (Louis Krages)	Porsche 935-K3	Porsche 930/79 3.0L F6 twin-turbo	D	273
14	**GTP**	**52**	**(France) WM AEREM**	**(France) Jean-Daniel Raulet** **(France) Marcel Mamers**	WM P79	Peugeot PRV ZNS4 2.7L; V6 turbo	M	272
15	Gr.5; SP	39	(France) ASA Cachia	(France) Jacques Guérin (France) "Chanaud" (Jacques Goujon) (France) Fréderic Alliot	Porsche 935	Porsche 3.0L F6 turbo	D	268
16	Gr.4; GT	86	(France) Kores Racing	(France) Georges Bourdillat (France) Roland Ennequin (France) Alain-Michel Bernhard	Porsche 934	Porsche 3.0L F6 turbo	M	265
17	**Gr.6**; **S 2.0**	**29**	**(United Kingdom) Mogil Motors Ltd**	**(United Kingdom) Tony Charnell** **(United Kingdom) Richard Jones** **(United Kingdom) Robin Smith**	Chevron B36	Cosworth BDG 2.0L S4	G	265
18	Gr.6; S 2.0	24	(United Kingdom) Dorset Racing Associates	(United Kingdom) Brian Joscelyne (United Kingdom) Tony Birchenhough (United Kingdom) Richard Jenvey (United Kingdom) Nick Mason	Lola T297	Cosworth BDG 2.0L S4	D	260
19	Gr.4; GT	84	(France) A.-C. Verney (private entrant)	(France) Anne-Charlotte Verney (France) Patrick Bardinon (France) René Metge	Porsche 934	Porsche 3.0L F6 turbo	D	251
20	Gr.6; S 3.0	15	(France) Fisons Agricole / (United Kingdom) Simon Phillips (private entrant)	(United Kingdom) Simon Phillips (United Kingdom) Martin Raymond (United Kingdom) Ray Mallock	De Cadenet LM76	Cosworth DFV 3.0L V8	G	250
21	Gr.6; S 2.0	20	(France) Lambretta SAFD	(France) Pierre Yver (Morocco) Max Cohen-Olivar (France) Michel Elkoubi	Lola T298	BMW M12 2.0L S4	G	248
22	Gr.6; S 2.0	28	(France) Société Racing; Organisation Course	(France) Bernard Verdier (France) Albert Dufréne (France) Noël del Bello	Chevron B36	Simca-ROC 2.0L S4	G	239

=== Did Not Finish ===
Pos	Class	No	Team	Drivers	Chassis	Engine	Tyre	Laps	Reason
DNF	Gr.6; S 3.0	11	(United States) Grand Touring Cars Inc; Ford Concessionaires France	(United Kingdom) Derek Bell (United Kingdom) David Hobbs (Australia) Vern Schuppan	Mirage M10	Cosworth DFV 3.0L V8	G	262	Engine (24hr)
DNF	IMSA; GTX	62	(France) Charles Pozzi / JMS Racing	(France) Jean-Claude Andruet (Italy) Spartaco Dini	Ferrari 512BB-LM	Ferrari 4.9L F12	M	240	Engine (21hr)
DNF	Gr.6; S 3.0	14	(West Germany) Essex Motorsport Porsche	(France) Bob Wollek (United States) Hurley Haywood	Porsche 936-78	Porsche 935/73 2.1L F6 twin-turbo	D	236	Accident (20hr)
DNF	IMSA; GTX	63	(France) Charles Pozzi / JMS Racing	(France) Michel Leclère (France) Claude Ballot-Léna (United States) Peter Gregg	Ferrari 512BB-LM	Ferrari 4.9L F12	M	219	Accident (19hr)
DNF	GTP	55	(France) J. Rondeau (private entrant)	(France) Jean Rondeau (France) Jacky Haran	Rondeau M379	Cosworth DFV 3.0L V8	G	207	Engine (19hr)
DNF	Gr.5; SP	36	(West Germany) Gelo Sportswear; International	(Liechtenstein) Manfred Schurti (West Germany) Hans Heyer	Porsche 935/77A	Porsche 3.0L F6 turbo	G	201	Engine (16hr)
DSQ	Gr.6; S 3.0	12	(West Germany) Essex Motorsport Porsche	(Belgium) Jacky Ickx (United Kingdom) Brian Redman	Porsche 936-78	Porsche 935/73 2.1L F6 twin-turbo	D	200	Outside assistance (18hr)
DNF	Gr.5; SP	37	(West Germany) Gelo Sportswear; International	(United Kingdom) John Fitzpatrick (West Germany) Harald Grohs (France) Jean-Louis Lafosse	Porsche 935/77A	Porsche 3.0L F6 turbo	G	196	Oil pipe (16hr)
DNF	Gr.6; S 2.0	25	(France) J.-M. Lemerle (private entrant)	(France) Jean-Marie Lemerle (France) Alain Levié (France) Jean-Pierre Malcher	Lola T298	Simca-ROC 2.0L S4	G	189	Engine (21hr)
DNF	Gr.6; S 2.0	33	(France) Société Racing; Organisation Course (Switzerland) André Chevalley Racing	(France) Marcel Tarres (France) Alain Dechelette (France) Charles Dechelette	Chevron B36	Simca-ROC 2.0L S4	G	187	Accident (19hr)
DNF	Gr.6; S 2.0	31	Kores Racing; France Chauffage	(France) Michel Lateste (France) Dominique Lacaud	Lola T297	BMW M12 2.0L S4	G	182	Clutch (21hr)
DNF	Gr.4; GT	87	(France) C. Bussi (private entrant)	(France) Christian Bussi (France) Bernard Salam	Porsche 934	Porsche 3.0L F6 turbo	D	182	Accident damage (18hr)
DNF	GTP	51	(France) WM AEREM	(France) Roger Dorchy (France) Denis Morin	WM P79	Peugeot PRV ZNS4 2.7L; V6 turbo	M	157	Accident (16hr)
DNF	IMSA; GTX	68	(United States) Interscope Racing	(United States) Ted Field (United States) Milt Minter (United States) John Morton	Porsche 935/79	Porsche 930/80 2.1L F6 twin-turbo	G	154	Engine (13hr)
DNF	Gr.6; S 3.0	3	(United Kingdom) JC Racing Ltd. (private entrant)	(United Kingdom) John Cooper (United Kingdom) Peter Lovett (United Kingdom) John Morrison	De Cadenet-Lola LM77	Cosworth DFV 3.0L V8	G	146	Electrics (16hr)
DNF	Gr.6; S 2.0	23	(France) Team Pronuptia	(France) Bruno Sotty (France) Gérard Cuynet (Switzerland) Marc Frischknecht	Lola T296	Cosworth BDG 2.0L S4	G	134	Accident (16hr)
DSQ	Gr.6; S 2.0	26	(France) Société Racing; Organisation Course	(France) Michel Dubois (France) Pierre-François Rousselot (France) Marc Menant	Chevron B36	Simca-ROC 2.0L S4	G	133	Insufficient distance (14hr)
DNF	Gr.6; S 2.0	32	(France) H. Striebig / BP Racing (private entrant)	(France) Hubert Striebig (France) Alain Cudini (France) Hughes Kirschoffer	ToJ SC206	BMW M12 2.0L S4	D	121	Fuel pump (13hr)
DSQ	Gr.6; S 3.0	10	(United States) Grand Touring Cars Inc; Ford Concessionaires France	(Australia) Vern Schuppan (France) Jean-Pierre Jaussaud (United Kingdom) David Hobbs	Mirage M10	Cosworth DFV 3.0L V8	G	121	Insufficient distance (13hr)
DSQ	Gr.5; SP	35	(Italy) C. Pietromarchi (private entrant)	(Italy) Carlo Pietromarchi (Italy) Gianfranco Brancatelli (Italy) Maurizio Micangeli	De Tomaso Pantera	Ford 351 5.8L V8	G	108	Insufficient distance (14hr)
DNF	Gr.6; S 2.0	27	(France) Société Racing; Organisation Course	(France) Marc Sourd (Switzerland) Florian Vetsch (France) Robert Carmillet	Chevron B36	Simca-ROC 2.0L S4	G	92	Accident (8hr)
DNF	Gr.6; S 2.0	17	(Switzerland) Cheetah Racing Cars	(Switzerland) Sandro Plastina (Switzerland) Philippe Roux (Switzerland) Mario Luini	Cheetah G-601	Simca-ROC 2.0L S4	G	87	Engine (10hr)
DNF	GTP	53	(France) WM AEREM	(France) Michel Pignard (France) Jacques Coulon (France) Serge Saulnier	WM P79	Peugeot PRV ZNS4 2.7L; V6 turbo	M	87	Front suspension (10hr)
DNF	Gr.6; S 2.0	18	(France) D. Brillat (Switzerland) Écurie Cedac Suisse (private entrant)	(France) Daniel Brillat (Switzerland) Jean-Pierre Aeschlimann	Cheetah G-601	BMW M12 2.0L S4	M	80	Engine (9hr)
DNF	IMSA; GTX	71	(United States) Dick Barbour Racing	(United States) Bob Akin (United States) Roy Woods (United States) Rob McFarlin	Porsche 935/77A	Porsche 930/78 3.0L F6 turbo	G	78	Engine (7hr)
DNF	Gr.6; S 2.0	22	(Switzerland) G. Morand (private entrant)	(France) Eric Vaugnat (France) Jacques Boillat	Lola T296	Cosworth BDG 2.0L S4	G	76	Electrics (12hr)
DNF	IMSA; GTX	74	(France) J.-P. Jarier (private entrant)	(France) Jean-Pierre Jarier (United States) Randy Townsend (France) Raymond Touroul	Porsche 935	Porsche 3.0L F6 turbo	G	65	Engine (6hr)
DNF	Gr.6; S 3.0	1	(Switzerland) André Chevalley Racing (private entrant)	(Switzerland) André Chevalley (France) Xavier Lapeyre (France) Patrick Perrier	Lola T286	Cosworth DFV 3.0L V8	G	59	Electrics (11hr)
DNF	IMSA; GTX	64	(United States) North American Racing Team	(France) Jean-Pierre Delaunay (France) Cyril Grandet (United States) Preston Henn	Ferrari 512BB-LM	Ferrari 4.9L F12	M	54	Accident (7hr)
DNF	Gr.6; S 3.0	6	(Japan) Dome Co. Ltd	(United Kingdom) Chris Craft (United Kingdom) Gordon Spice	Dome Zero RL	Cosworth DFV 3.0L V8	D	40	Out of fuel (6hr)
DNF	Gr.6; S 3.0	7	(Japan) Dome Co. Ltd	(United Kingdom) Bob Evans (United Kingdom) Tony Trimmer	Dome Zero RL	Cosworth DFV 3.0L V8	D	25	Engine (4hr)
DNF	GTP	50	(United Kingdom) R. Hamilton (private entrant)	(United Kingdom) Robin Hamilton (United Kingdom) Mike Salmon	Aston Martin RHAM/1	Aston Martin 5.3L V8 turbo	D	21	Oil leak (4hr)
DNF	Gr.6; S 3.0	8	(United Kingdom) A. de Cadenet (private entrant)	(United Kingdom) Alain de Cadenet (France) François Migault	De Cadenet LM78	Cosworth DFV 3.0L V8	G	10	Gearbox (4hr)

=== Did Not Start ===
Pos	Class	No	Team	Drivers	Chassis	Engine	Tyre	Reason
DNA	Gr.6; S 5.0	16	(United Kingdom) March Racing	(Austria) Dieter Quester (United Kingdom) Guy Edwards (United Kingdom) Ian Grob	March-BMW M1	BMW M88 3.5L S6	**D**	Did not qualify
DNQ	Gr.6; S 2.0	21	(France) Lambretta SAFD	(France) François Calmels (France) Renaud Laverre (France) Patrice Lenormand	Lola T296	Simca-ROC 2.0L S4	**G**	Did not qualify
DNQ	Gr.6; S 2.0	30	(France) ASA Cachia / (Brazil) F. Migault (private entrant)	(France) Pascal Foix (France) Michel Bienvault (United Kingdom) Murray Smith	Lola T296	Simca-ROC 2.0L S4		Did not practice
DNQ	IMSA; GTX	77	(Japan) Mazda Auto Tokyo	(Japan) Yojiro Terada (Japan) Tetsu Ikuzawa (France) Claude Buchet	Mazda RX-7	Mazda 13B 1.3L twin-rotary	**D**	Did not qualify
DNQ	Gr.4; GT	80	(Switzerland) Écurie des 13 Etoiles (private entrant)	(Switzerland) Antoine Salamin (Switzerland) Gérard Vial (Switzerland) Philippe Collet	Porsche 934	Porsche 3.0L F6 turbo		Did not qualify
DNA	Gr.6; S 3.0	2	(Switzerland) André Chevalley Racing (private entrant)	(France) Patrick Perrier (Italy) Marco Capoferri (Italy) Renzo Zorzi	Lola T286	Cosworth DFV 3.0L V8		Did not arrive
DNA	GTP	54	(Switzerland) Walter Brun Racing; Organisation	(Switzerland) Walter Brun (France) Alain Cudini	BMW M1	BMW M88 3.5L S6		Did not arrive
DNA	GTP	60	(Switzerland) P. Sauber AG / (Canada) D. Rowe (private entrant)	(Canada) Douglas Rowe (Canada) Bill Adam; A.A. Lorent	Chevrolet Corvette	Chevrolet 7.0L V8		Did not arrive
DNA	IMSA; GTX	65	(United States) North American Racing Team		Ferrari 512 BB-LM	Ferrari 4.9L F12	**M**	Did not arrive
DNA	IMSA; GTX	66	(Switzerland) SA Mo.Car SpA	(Switzerland) Clay Regazzoni	Ferrari 512 BB	Ferrari 4.9L F12	**M**	Did not arrive
DNA	IMSA; GTX	67	(United States) D. Whittington (private entrant)	(United States) Don Whittington (United States) Bill Whittington	Porsche 935/79	Porsche 930/79 3.3L F6 twin-turbo		Did not arrive
DNA	Gr.4; GT	81	(West Germany) Autohaus Max Moritz GmbH	(West Germany) Edgar Dören (West Germany) Gerhard Holup (West Germany) Uwe Reich (West Germany) Eckhard Schimpf	Porsche 934	Porsche 3.0L F6 turbo		Did not arrive

=== Class Winners ===
Class	Winning car	Winning drivers
Group 6 S Sports 3-litre	#5 Rondeau M379	Ragnotti / Darniche
Group 6 S Sports 2-litre	#29 Chevron B36	Charnell / Jones / Smith
Group 5 SP Special Production	#41 Porsche 935-K3	Ludwig / D. Whittington / W. Whittington
Group 4 GTS Special GT	#82 Porsche 934	Pallavicini / Müller / Vanoli
GTP Le Mans GT Prototype	#52 WM P79	Raulet / Mamers
IMSA GTX GT Experimental	#70 Porsche 935-79	Barbour / Stommelen / Newman

- Note: although all classes, by definition, set speed records for the revised circuit, none exceeded the previous distance records.

=== Index of Fuel Consumption ===
Pos	Class	No	Team	Drivers	Chassis	Fuel consumed	Distance covered	Score
1	Gr.6; S 2.0	24	(United Kingdom) Dorset Racing Associates	(United Kingdom) Brian Joscelyne (United Kingdom) Tony Birchenhough (United Kingdom) Richard Jenvey (United Kingdom) Nick Mason	Lola T297	810 litres	3449.29 km	23.48
2	Gr.6; S 2.0	20	(France) Lambretta SAFD	(France) Pierre Yver (Morocco) Max Cohen-Olivar (France) Michel Elkoubi	Lola T298	852 litres	3262.16 km	26.12
3	Gr.6; S 2.0	28	(France) Société Racing; Organisation Course	(France) Bernard Verdier (France) Albert Dufréne (France) Noël del Bello	Chevron B36	915 litres	3134.74 km	29.19
4	Gr.6; S 2.0	29	(United Kingdom) Mogil Motors Ltd	(United Kingdom) Tony Charnell (United Kingdom) Richard Jones (United Kingdom) Robin Smith	Chevron B36	1073 litres	3526.42 km	30.44
5	Gr.6; S 3.0	15	(France) Fisons Agricole / (United Kingdom) Simon Phillips (private entrant)	(United Kingdom) Simon Phillips (United Kingdom) Martin Raymond (United Kingdom) Ray Mallock	De Cadenet LM76	1201 litres	3291.35 km	36.49
6	Gr.4; GT	84	(France) A.-C. Verney (private entrant)	(France) Anne-Charlotte Verney (France) Patrick Bardinon (France) René Metge	Porsche 934	1274 litres	3299.49 km	38.61
7	Gr.4; GT	82	(Switzerland) Lubrifilm Racing Team	(Switzerland) Herbert Müller (Switzerland) Angelo Pallavicini (Switzerland) Marco Vanoli	Porsche 934	1601 litres	3972.75 km	40.30
8	GTP	52	(France) WM AEREM	(France) Jean-Daniel Raulet (France) Marcel Mamers	WM P79	1509 litres	3643.56 km	41.41
9	Gr.6; S 3.0	5	(France) J. Rondeau (private entrant)	(France) Jean Ragnotti (France) Bernard Darniche	Rondeau M379	1689 litres	3916.90 km	43.12
10	IMSA; GTX	76	(France) H. Poulain (private entrant)	(France) Hervé Poulain (West Germany) Manfred Winkelhock (France) Marcel Mignot	BMW M1	1691 litres	3874.84 km	43.64

- Note: Only the top ten positions are included in this set of standings.

=== Statistics ===
Taken from Quentin Spurring's book, officially licensed by the ACO

- Fastest Lap in practice –B. Wollek, #14 Porsche 936-79– 3:30.1secs; 233.52 km/h (145.10 mph)
- Fastest Lap –J.-Ickx, #12 Porsche 936-79 – 3:36.1secs; 227.00 km/h (141.05 mph)
- Winning Distance – 4,173.93 km (2,593.56 mi)
- Winner's Average Speed – 173.92 km/h (108.07 mph)
- Attendance – 150,000

Citations
