= Alain Cudini =

French racing driver (born 1946)

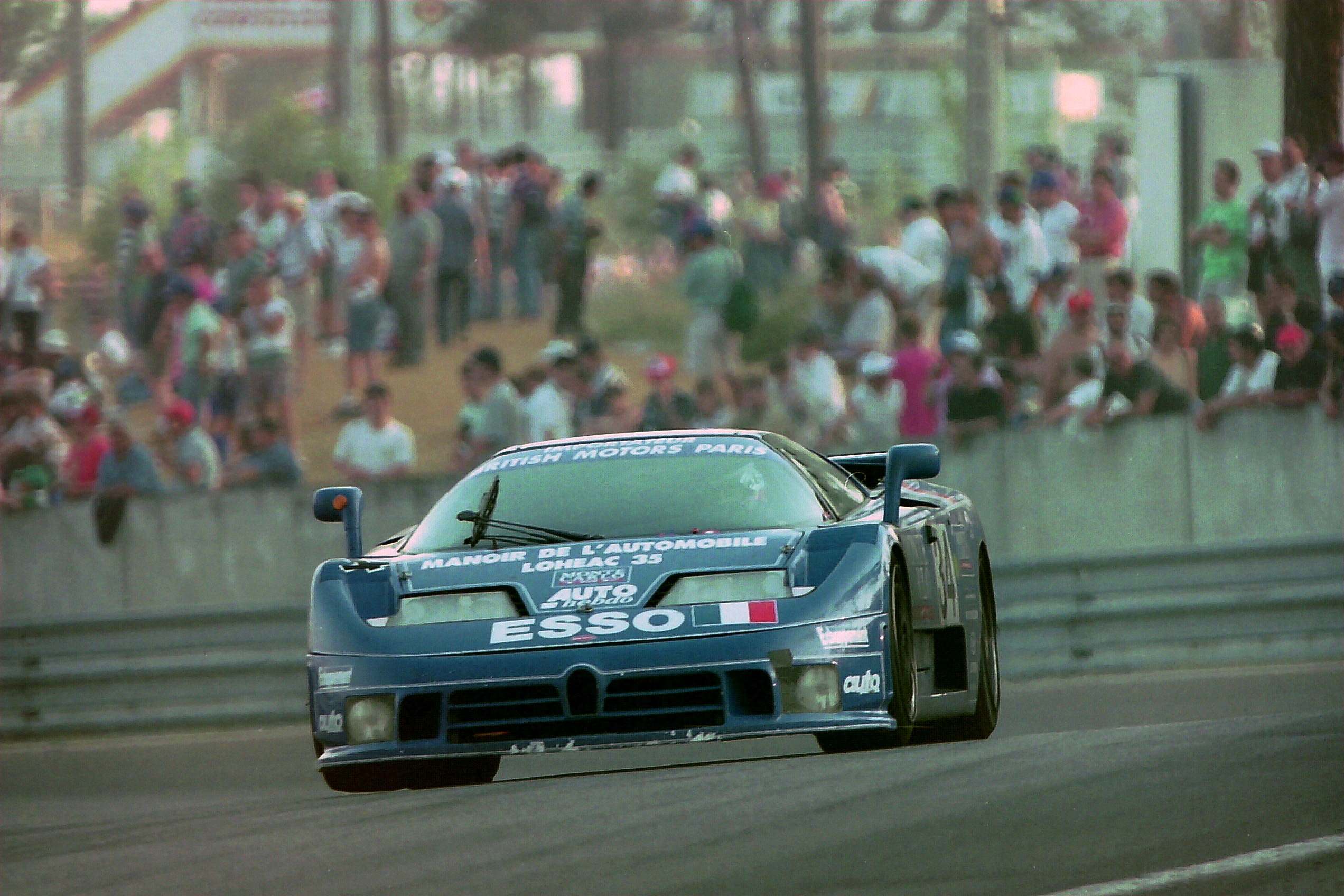
- Nationality: (France) French
- Born: 19 April 1946 (age 80) Colombes Hauts-de-Seine, France

Alain Cudini (born 19 April 1946) is a French former racing driver.

== 24 Hours of Le Mans results ==
Year	Team	Co-Drivers	Car	Class	Laps	Pos.	Class Pos.
1972	(United States) John Greenwood Racing	(France) Bernard Darniche (United States) John Greenwood	Chevrolet Corvette C3	GTS +5.0	82	DNF	DNF
1974	(United States) North American Racing Team	(United States) Dave Heinz	Ferrari 365 GTB/4	GTS 5.0	313	6th	2nd
1975	(France) H. Greder	(France) Henri Greder	Chevrolet Corvette C3	GTS	0	DNF	DNF
1976	(France) G. Méo	(France) Raymond Touroul	Porsche 911 Carrera RSR	Gp.5 SP	314	6th	2nd
1977	(Italy) Osella Squadra Corse	(France) Raymond Touroul (Italy) Anna Cambiaghi	Osella PA5	Gr.6 S 2.0	100	DNF	DNF
1979	(France) H. Striebig / BP Racing	(France) Hubert Striebig (France) Hughes Kirschoffer	ToJ SC206	Gr.6 S 2.0	121	DNF	DNF
1981	(United States) North American Racing Team	(France) Philippe Gurdjian (United States) John Morton	Ferrari 512BB/LM	IMSA GTX	247	DNF	DNF
1982	(United States) North American Racing Team	(United States) John Morton (United States) John Paul Jr.	Ferrari 512BB/LM	IMSA GTX	306	9th	4th
1983	(France) Automobiles Jean Rondeau	(France) Dany Snobeck (France) Xavier Lapeyre	Rondeau M382	Gr.C	31	DNF	DNF
1989	(Switzerland) Team Sauber Mercedes	(France) Jean-Louis Schlesser (France) Jean-Pierre Jabouille	Sauber C9	Gr.C	379	5th	5th
1990	(France) Courage Compétition	(Belgium) Hervé Regout (Greece) Costas Los	Nissan R89C	Gr.C1	300	22nd	20th
1994	(France) M. Hommel	(France) Éric Hélary (France) Jean-Christophe Boullion	Bugatti EB110 SS	LM-GT1	230	DNF	DNF
1996	(United States) Canaska Southwind Motorsport	(Canada) Victor Sifton (United States) John Morton	Dodge Viper GTS-R	LM-GT1	269	23rd	14th
