= Jacques Henry =

French rally driver

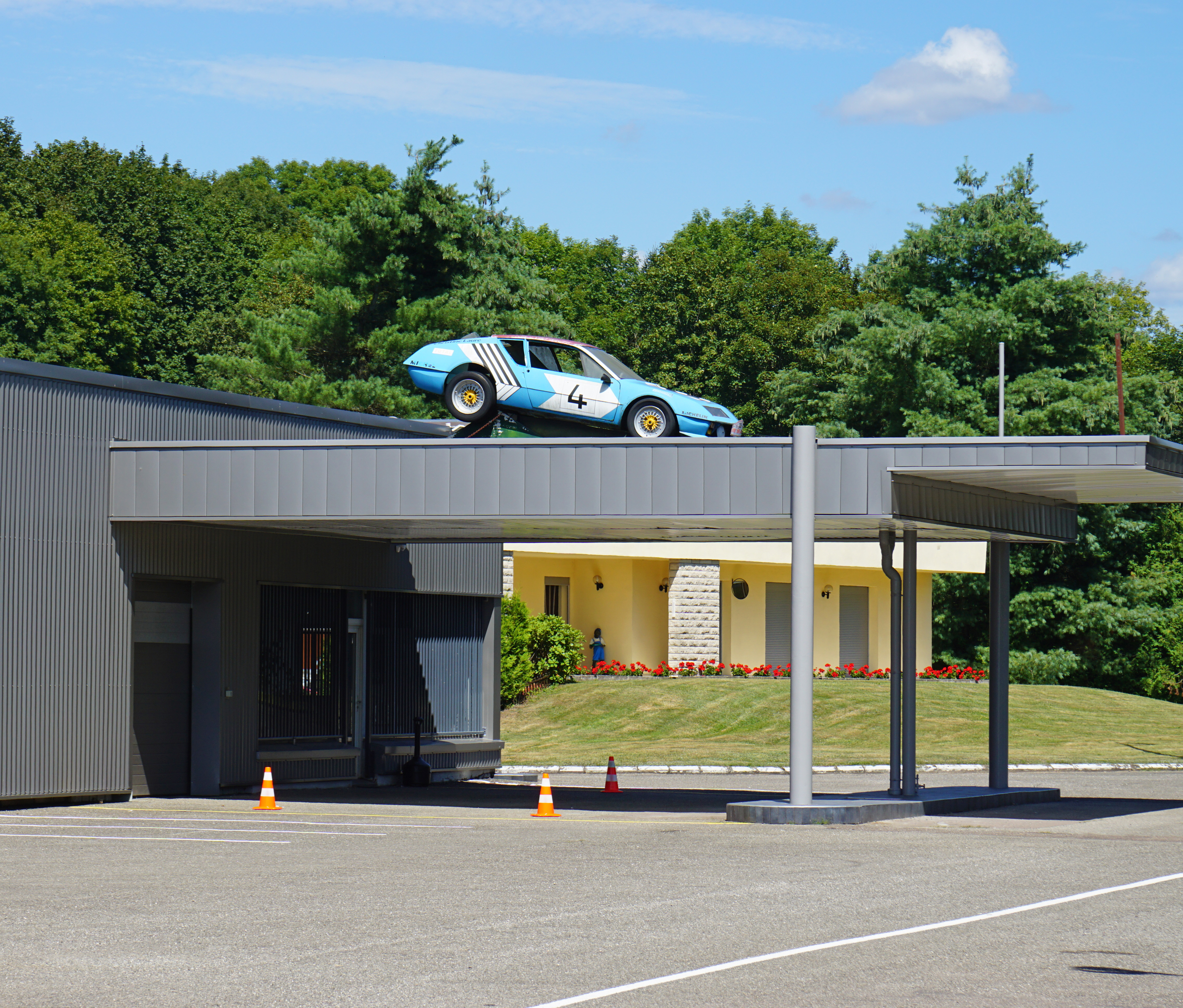
An Alpine A310 on the former Jacques Henry garage in Roye (2016)

Jacques Henry, known as "Old Jack", (15 May 1942 in Lure (Haute-Saône – 19 November 2016) was a French private rally driver from the 1970s. He was a double champion of France of the rallies on Alpine-Renault A110bis, in 1974 and 1975. He won the S2.0 class at the 1977 24 Hours of Le Mans.

== 24 Hours of Le Mans results ==
Year	Team	Co-Drivers	Car	Class	Laps	Pos.	Class Pos.
1973	France Jacques Henry	(France) Fred Stalder (France) Bernard Grobot	Lola T290	S 2.0	64	DNF	DNF
1975	France Société ROC	(France) François Sérvanin (France) Albert Dufréne	Lola T294	S 2.0	258	24th	3rd
1977	France Racing Organisation Course	(France) Michel Pignard (France) Albert Dufréne	Chevron B36	Gr.6 S 2.0	303	6th	1st
1978	France ROC La Pierre du Nord	(Morocco) Max Cohen-Olivar (France) Albert Dufréne	Chevron B36	Gr.6 S 2.0	195	DNF	DNF
