= John Morton (racing driver) =

American racing driver (born 1942)

John Morton (born February 17, 1942) is an American racing driver from Waukegan, Illinois.

== Early life ==
After his father took him to a race at Road America in 1957, Morton became an avid racing fan. He went on to race jalopies in South Carolina before he dropped out of Clemson University to attend Carroll Shelby's racing school at Riverside Raceway in California. Taking a menial job working in Carroll Shelby's race shop Shelby American in Venice California, Morton saved his money to purchase his first race car, a Lotus Super 7 which he raced in SCCA (Sports Car Club of America) amateur races in 1963.

== Career ==
In 1964, Morton drove with Ken Miles at Sebring in the prototype 427 Cobra CSX2196, aka "The Turd" for Shelby American Racing. Originally, Morton had no intention to race that weekend, but Miles asked him to be a reserve driver. Lacking a FIA Federation Internationale de l'Automobile license Miles wrote a letter of recommendation to the race sanctioning body on the spot. Teaming with Miles and Skip Scott, Morton won the GT class at the Road America 500, second overall, in a team Cobra. That year, he bought his second race car, a Lotus 23B.

Morton raced mostly SCCA Club races through 1968 until Peter Brock (the American designer, motorsports writer and photographer, not the Australian racer) hired him for his new BRE Datsun team. The period between 1969 and 1972 was fruitful for John, Peter and Datsun. The team disbanded after the 1972 season after dominating both SCCA C Production with the 240Z (National Championships in 1970-71) and the 2.5 Trans-Am with the 510 in 1971-72.

Racing in F5000, Can-Am and IMSA occupied the next few years. A short almost accidental foray into the movie industry in 1975 led to stunt work on films, including Gumball Rally and Greased Lightning; and several TV shows, including The Rockford Files and Fantasy Island. In 1981, Phil Conte joined Morton's small Can-Am team as a sponsor for two years after which Phil formed his own IMSA team with John as one of his two drivers in the GTP category.

In 1985, Jim Busby hired Morton as team driver in one of his BF Goodrich sponsored Porsche 962s with Pete Halsmer. The pair won the Times GP at Riverside in 1985. In 1987, Morton drove for the Group 44 Jaguar team of Bob Tullius and won the last Times GP at Riverside and the West Palm Beach GP, both sharing the car with Hurley Haywood. The Walkinshaw team replaced Tullius' Jaguar team for 1988 and the Electramotive Nissan Team signed Morton. Morton and Geoff Brabham won several races that year setting the stage for Nissan's domination of the IMSA series for several years.

Other notable Nissan races for Morton during 1989–95 include an overall victory at Sebring and several class wins, including Le Mans. Morton was third overall in a Joest Porsche in 1986 and class winner in a BFG Mazda Lola in 1984, competing nine times at Le Mans. Several races in various other classes and categories include Sprint cars and karts. He made his CART debut in the first race of the 1984 season at the Long Beach Grand Prix and finished 9th but was never able to get a ride in competitive car.

In his most recent professional races, 1997–2001, Morton raced Porsches in both the Grand Am Rolex Sports Car Series and American Le Mans Series. Currently most of John's competition is in vintage races driving a variety of cars, which include Cobra coupes, Corvettes, Porsches, and a Sunbeam Tiger.

Morton has competed at the Monterey Historic Automobile Races many times. In 2010, he suffered a crash when his Scarab flipped end-over-end near turn two of Mazda Raceway Laguna Seca, landing upside down with a broken roll bar. He was taken to the hospital, and was determined to be fine. The Scarab was seriously damaged, but it was rebuilt and restored to original specifications and recently won the Amelia Island Concours.

In 2013, the Sports Car Club of America held the 50th Running of the National Runoffs. Because of this, momentous event special rules were in place to allow former champions to enter the event without running any of that season's qualifying events. Bonk Brothers Racing and LNA Enterprises prepared a Nissan 240Z for Morton to run at the event. Due to poor weather he was only able to have 2 sessions in the car. He was able to qualify 13th and finish 10th.

In 2013, Motorbooks published Morton’s first person account: “Inside Shelby American - Wrenching and Racing with Carroll Shelby in the 1960s."

In 2026, Morton was inducted into the Motorsports Hall of Fame of America.

== Racing record ==
=== SCCA National Championship Runoffs ===
Year	Track	Car	Engine	Class	Finish	Start	Status
1968	Riverside	Lotus	Porsche	B Sports Racer	4		Running
1969	Daytona	Datsun SRL311	Datsun	D Production	15	2	Retired
1970	Road Atlanta	Nissan 240Z	Nissan	C Production	1	1	Running
1971	Road Atlanta	Nissan 240Z	Nissan	C Production	1	1	Running
2013	Road America	Nissan 240Z	Nissan	E Production	10	13	Running

=== 24 Hours of Le Mans results ===
Year	Team	Co-Drivers	Car	Class	Laps	Pos.	Class Pos.
1979	(United States) Interscope Racing	(United States) Ted Field (United States) Milt Minter	Porsche 935/79	IMSA; GTX	154	DNF	DNF
1981	(United States) North American Racing Team	(France) Alain Cudini (France) Philippe Gurdjian	Ferrari 512BB/LM	IMSA; GTX	247	DNF	DNF
1982	(United States) North American Racing Team	(France) Alain Cudini (United States) John Paul Sr.	Ferrari 512BB/LM	IMSA; GTX	306	9th	4th
1984	(United States) B. F. Goodrich Company	(Japan) Yoshimi Katayama (United States) John O'Steen	Lola T616-Mazda	C2	320	10th	1st
1986	(Germany) Joest Racing	(United States) George Follmer (United States) Kenper Miller	Porsche 956	C1	355	3rd	3rd
1994	(United States) Cunningham Racing	(New Zealand) Steve Millen (United States) Johnny O'Connell	Nissan 300ZX Turbo	IMSA; GTS	317	5th	1st
1996	(United States) Canaska Southwind Motorsport	(France) Alain Cudini (Canada) Victor Sifton	Chrysler Viper GTS-R	LMGT1	269	23rd	14th
1997	(France) Société Viper Team Oreca	(United Kingdom) Justin Bell (France) Pierre Yver	Chrysler Viper GTS-R	LMGT2	278	14th	6th
1998	(Canada) CJ Motorsport	(Canada) John Graham (Germany) Harald Grohs	Porsche 911 GT2	LMGT2	164	DNF	DNF

==== Indy Car World Series ====
Year	Team	1	2	3	4	5	6	7	8	9	10	11	12	13	14	15	16	17	Rank	Points	Ref
1984	BCV Racing	LBH; 9	PHX1	INDY	MIL	POR	MEA	CLE	MIS1	ROA									35th	5	
1984	Jet Engineering										POC; 20	MDO; 26	SAN	MIS2	PHX2; DNQ	LAG; 17	LVG; 12		35th	5	
1986	Gohr Racing	PHX1	LBH	INDY	MIL	POR	MEA	CLE	TOR; 12	MIS1	POC	MDO	SAN	MIS2	ROA	LAG	PHX2	MIA	35th	1	
1990	Gohr Racing	PHX	LBH	INDY	MIL	DET; DNQ	POR	CLE	MEA	TOR	MCH	DEN	VAN	MDO	ROA	NAZ	LAG		NR	0	
