= Hervé Poulain =

French racing driver, author, and auctioneer

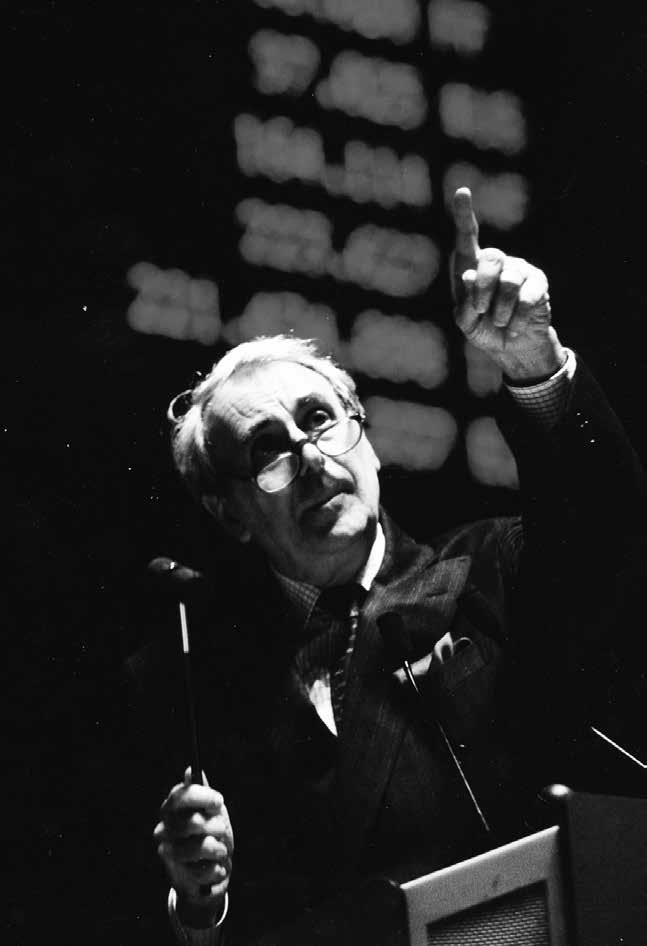
Photo of Hervé Poulain

Hervé Poulain (born 16 December 1940) is a retired French racing driver, author, and auctioneer. He is best known today as the instigator of the BMW Art Car project. Poulain's idea was to invite contemporary artists to use new automobiles, which he raced at the 24 Hours of Le Mans.

In 1975, BMW commissioned Poulain's friend Alexander Calder to paint the first BMW Art Car. This first example would be a BMW 3.0 CSL 'Batmobile' which Poulain himself would race in the 1975 24 Hours of Le Mans. Poulain drove Calder's BMW with Jean Guichet and Sam Posey, although the car suffered driveshaft issues and was retired early, and never raced again. Calder died a year later in 1976.

In 1976, Frank Stella painted a BMW 3.0 CSL for the 1976 24 Hours of Le Mans. It was driven by Brian Redman and Peter Gregg.

In 1977, Poulain drove the Roy Lichtenstein's Art Car, a Group 5 BMW 320i, which 9th overall and first in its class at the 1977 24 Hours of Le Mans.

In 1978, BMW asked Andy Warhol to paint a black BMW 320i for the 1978 24 Hours of Le Mans, but the model was changed and failed to qualify for the race. In 1979, Warhol painted a BMW M1 Group 4 racing version that was more successful at the 1979 24 Hours of Le Mans, with Poulain, Manfred Winkelhock and Marcel Mignot behind the wheel. They completed 288 laps at the Sarthe circuit, coming in 6th overall, and 2nd in their class. During the course of that race the car made contact with other cars several times. Warhol had painted spare bumpers and body panels, which were necessary.
