= François Sérvanin =

French former racing driver (born 1941)

François Servanin (born 20 September 1941) is a French former racing driver.

== 24 Hours of Le Mans results ==
Year	Team	Co-Drivers	Car	Class	Laps	Pos.	Class Pos.
1974	(France) Société Racing Organisation Course	(France) Fred Stalder (France) Robert Mieusset	Lola T292	S 2.0	145	DNF	DNF
1975	(France) Société Racing Organisation Course	(France) Jacques Henry (France) Albert Dufrène	Lola T294	S 2.0	258	24th	3rd
1976	(France) Société Racing Organisation Course	(France) Laurent Ferrier	Chevron B36	Gp.6 2.0	88	DNF	DNF
1977	(Switzerland) Schiller Racing	(France) Laurent Ferrier (France) Franz Hummel	Porsche 934	Gr.4 GT	160	DNF	DNF
1978	(France) A.-C. Verney / BP Racing	(France) Anne-Charlotte Verney (France) Xavier Lapeyre	Porsche 911 Carrera RSR	Gr.4 GT	279	12th	1st
1979	(West Germany) Porsche Kremer Racing	(France) Laurent Ferrier (France) François Trisconi	Porsche 935/77A	Gr.5 SP	297	3rd	2nd
1980	(France) BMW Zol-Auto	(France) Laurent Ferrier (France) Pierre-François Rousselot	BMW M1	IMSA	237	DNF	DNF
1981	(France) BMW Zol-Auto	(France) Laurent Ferrier (France) Pierre-François Rousselot	BMW M1	Gr.4 GT	212	DNF	DNF
1982	(United States) Cooke Racing-BP	(France) Dany Snobeck (France) René Metge	Porsche 935-K3	IMSA GTX	325	5th	2nd
1983	(United States) Cooke Racing	(United States) Ralph Kent-Cooke (United States) Jim Adams	Lola T610	Gr.C	165	DNF	DNF
1984	(United Kingdom) John Bartlett Racing	(France) François Migault (United Kingdom) Steve Kempton	Lola T610	Gr.C2	52	DNF	DNF
1985	(France) Rondeau-Primagaz (France) P. Yver	(France) Pierre Yver (France) Pierre-François Rousselot	Rondeau M382	Gr.C1	286	DNF	DNF
