= Michel Picard =

Michel Picard may refer to:

- Michel Picard (canoeist) (born 1934), French canoer
- Michel Picard (ice hockey) (born 1969), NHL player
- Michel Picard (politician) (born 1960), Canadian politician
- Michel Picard (rower) (born 1954), French lightweight rower
- Michel Picard (writer) (born 1931), French writer
