= Marcel Mignot =

French former racing driver (born 1944)

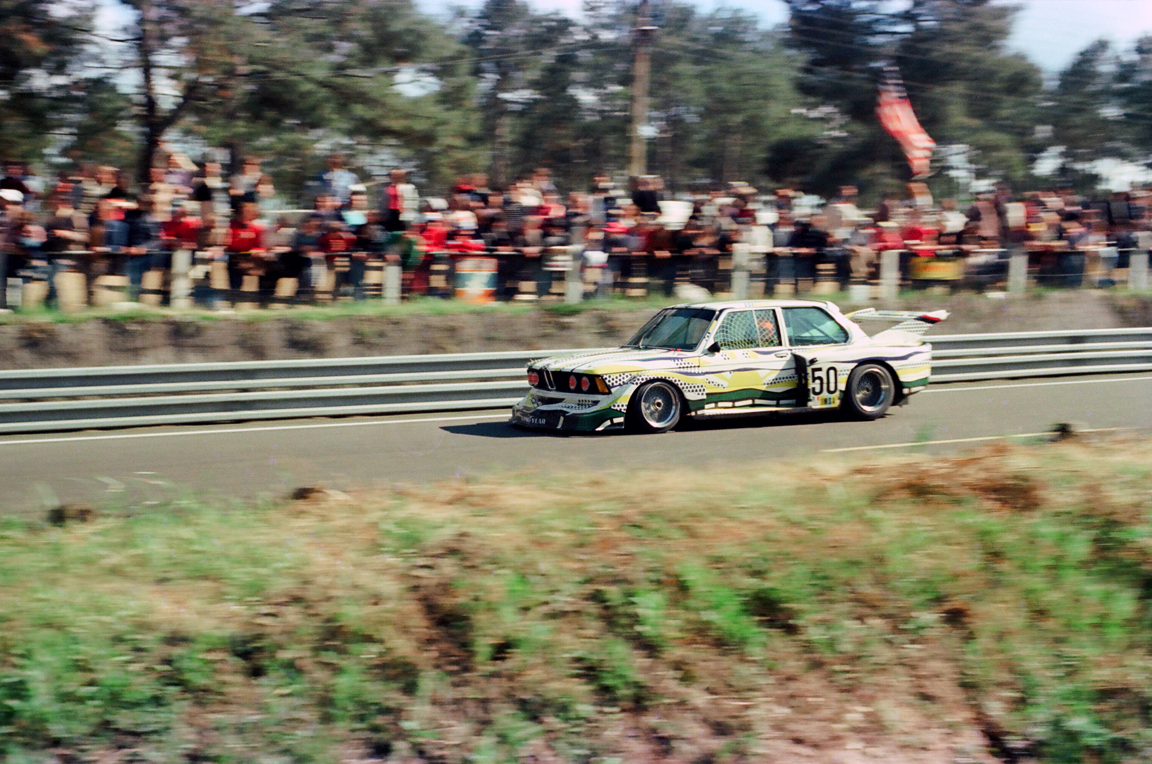
Marcel Mignot and Hervé Poulain also drove the BMW 320i Group 5, painted by Roy Lichtenstein, in the 1977 24 Hours of Le Mans and placed 9th

Marcel Mignot (born 11 June 1944) is a French former racing driver. Mignot along with Hervé Poulain and Manfred Winkelhock drove a BMW M1 Group 4 racing version that was painted by pop artist Andy Warhol for the 1979 24 Hours of Le Mans. They completed came in sixth overall and second in their class.
