= Laurent Ferrier =

Swiss watch manufacturer

- Company type: Private
- Industry: Haute Horology
- Founded: 2009; 17 years ago
- Founders: Laurent Ferrier; François Servanin
- Headquarters: Route de Saint-Julien 150, 1228 Plan-les-Ouates; Switzerland
- Key people: Florent Perrichon, CEO
- Products: Luxury Mechanical Watches
- Website: laurentferrier.ch

Laurent Ferrier is a Swiss watch manufacturer founded in 2009 and named after its founder, Laurent Ferrier. The company focuses on luxury watches with a production of around 300 watches in 2021. The company is headquartered in Plan-les-Ouates in the canton of Geneva, Switzerland.

== Founder ==
Laurent Ferrier, born December 19, 1946, is a son and grandson of watchmakers. His father worked on watches giving young Laurent an early exposure to Haute Horlogerie. He trained at a watchmaking school and joined Patek Philippe shortly after. There, he worked on the prototype of the Genta-designed Nautilus.

Laurent Ferrier was also a semi-professional car racer, driving various models such as the Lotus 18, Porsche 934, Porsche 935, and the BMW M1. In 1979 he finished 3rd at Le Mans, behind Paul Newman. It was during his racing years that he met and befriended François Servanin who would later become his associate. He worked at Patek Philippe for the next 30 years attaining the rank of technical director before launching his eponymous brand in 2010.

== Awards ==
- 2010 Grand Prix d'Horlogerie de Genève, Men's Watch Prize (Galet Classic Tourbillon Double Spiral)
- 2015 Grand Prix d'Horlogerie de Genève, Horological Revelation Prize (Galet Square)
- 2018 Grand Prix d'Horlogerie de Genève, Men's Complication Watch Prize (Galet Annual Calendar School Piece)
