= Philippe Gurdjian =

Philippe Gurdjian (18 January 1945 – 30 August 2014) was a French race driver and motorsport promoter. He won the GT class at the 1977 24 Hours of Le Mans in a Porsche 934, co-driven by Bob Wollek and Jean-Pierre Wielemans.

As a motorsport promoter, Gurdjian organised the French and Spanish Grands Prix. He was also involved in establishing the Malaysian and Abu Dhabi races.

Gurdjian was a recipient of the French Order of Merit (OM) in 2006.
