= Rothmans 50,000 =

1972 Rothmans 50,000
- Non-championship Formula Libre race

Race details
- Date: 28 August 1972
- Official name: Rothmans 50,000
- Location: Brands Hatch, Kent, Great Britain
- Course: Permanent racing facility
- Course length: 4.264 km (2.650 miles)
- Distance: 118 laps, 503.152 km (312.644 miles)

Pole position
Driver	(Brazil) Emerson Fittipaldi	Lotus-Cosworth
- Time: 1:22.5

Fastest lap
Driver	(Brazil) Emerson Fittipaldi	Lotus-Cosworth
- Time: 1:25.1

Podium
First	(Brazil) Emerson Fittipaldi	Lotus-Cosworth
Second	(United Kingdom) Brian Redman	McLaren-Cosworth
Third	(France) Henri Pescarolo	March-Cosworth

The Rothmans 50,000 was a non-championship motor race held at the Brands Hatch circuit on 28 August 1972 with a prize fund of £50,000.

The race was held to Formula Libre rules, but the top placing three cars were all Formula One cars - with Emerson Fittipaldi winning the race from pole in a Lotus 72, Brian Redman in a McLaren M19A taking second and Henri Pescarolo driving a March 711 finishing third.

The race was run over 118 laps of the full GP circuit and initial plans were for an entry of up to 100 cars with a race for the first thirty qualifiers and a secondary race for qualifiers in positions 30 to 60. The entry list was ultimately lower than expected but a secondary race was still run. This was won by Dave Morgan (Brabham BT38), with Ian Ashley (Lola T191) and Tony Dean (Brabham BT30/36) second and third respectively.

== Classification ==
=== Qualifying ===
Pos	Name	Chassis	Engine	Category	Time
1	(Brazil) Emerson Fittipaldi	Lotus 72	Cosworth DFV	Formula One	1:22.5
2	(United Kingdom) Brian Redman	McLaren M19A	Cosworth DFV	Formula One	1:23.4
3	(France) Jean-Pierre Beltoise	BRM P160	BRM	Formula One	1:24.5
4	(New Zealand) Howden Ganley	BRM P160	BRM	Formula One	1:25.2
5	(France) Henri Pescarolo	March 711	Cosworth DFV	Formula One	1:25.2
6	(United Kingdom) Gerry Birrell	March 722	Cosworth BDA	Formula Two	1:25.3
7	(New Zealand) Graham McRae	McRae GM1	Chevrolet	Formula 5000	1:25.9
8	(United Kingdom) John Watson	Chevron B20	Cosworth BDA	Formula Two	1:26.0
9	(United Kingdom) Peter Westbury	Brabham BT38	Cosworth BDA	Formula Two	1:26.0
10	(South Africa) Jody Scheckter	McLaren M21	Cosworth BDA	Formula Two	1:26.0
11	(United Kingdom) James Hunt	March 712M	Cosworth BDA	Formula Two	1:26.1
12	(Canada) John Cannon	March 725	Oldsmobile	Formula 5000	1:26.4
13	(United Kingdom) David Purley	March 721G	Cosworth DFV	Formula One	1:26.5
14	(Denmark) Tom Belsø	Brabham BT38	Cosworth BDA	Formula Two	1:26.6
15	(United Kingdom) Steve Thompson	Surtees TS8	Chevrolet	Formula 5000	1:26.6
16	(Argentina) Carlos Reutemann	Brabham BT38	Cosworth BDA	Formula Two	1:26.6
17	(United Kingdom) Alan Rollinson	Lola T300	Chevrolet	Formula 5000	1:26.8
18	(Australia) Tim Schenken	Brabham BT38	Cosworth BDA	Formula Two	1:26.8
19	(Netherlands) Gijs van Lennep	Surtees TS11	Chevrolet	Formula 5000	1:26.8
20	(Australia) Vern Schuppan	March 722	Cosworth BDA	Formula Two	1:26.8
21	(United Kingdom) Ray Allen	McLaren M18	Chevrolet	Formula 5000	1:27.2
22	(United Kingdom) John Wingfield	Brabham BT36	Cosworth BDA	Formula Two	1:27.2
23	(United Kingdom) David Prophet	McLaren M10B	Chevrolet	Formula 5000	1:27.3
24	(Australia) Alan Jones	GRD 272	Cosworth BDA	Formula Two	1:27.3
25	(United Kingdom) Richard Scott	Brabham BT38	Cosworth FVC	Formula Two	1:27.4
26	(Belgium) Claude Bourgoignie	GRD 272	Cosworth BDA	Formula Two	1:28.1
27	(Italy) Mario Casoni	Lola T280	Cosworth DFV	Sports car	1:28.1
28	(United Kingdom) Gordon Spice	Kitchmac	Chevrolet	Formula 5000	1:28.1
29	(United Kingdom) Keith Holland	Lola T190X	Chevrolet	Formula 5000	1:28.2
30	(United Kingdom) Ronnie Mackay	Brabham BT30/36	Cosworth FVA	Formula Atlantic	1:28.3
Did not qualify
31	(United Kingdom) Tony Dean	Brabham BT30	Cosworth FVC	Formula Two	1:28.4
32	(United Kingdom) Guy Edwards	Lola T290	Chevrolet	Sports car	1:28.4
33	(United Kingdom) Tony Lanfranchi	McLaren M18	Chevrolet	Formula 5000	1:28.6
34	(United Kingdom) Peter Hanson	Chevron B21	Cosworth FVC	Sports car	1:28.7
35	(France) Bob Wollek	Chevron B21	Cosworth FVC	Sports car	1:28.8
36	(United Kingdom) Ian Ashley	Lola T190	Chevrolet	Formula 5000	1:28.9
37	(United Kingdom) John Burton	Chevron B21	Cosworth FVC	Sports car	1:28.9
38	(United Kingdom) Clive Santo	McLaren M10B	Chevrolet	Formula 5000	1:29.4
39	(United Kingdom) Dave Morgan	Brabham BT38	Cosworth BDA	Formula Two	1:30.0
40	(France) François Migault	Connew PC1	Cosworth DFV	Formula One	1:30.3
41	(United Kingdom) Jock Russell	McRae GM1	Chevrolet	Formula 5000	1:30.5
42	(United Kingdom) Peter Gethin	Chevron B20	Cosworth BDA	Formula Two	1:30.5
43	(United Kingdom) Brian Robinson	Chevron B21	Cosworth FVC	Sports car	1:31.1
44	(United Kingdom) Andrew Fletcher	Chevron B21	Cosworth FVC	Sports car	1:31.1
45	(United Kingdom) Ian Mawby	Lotus 69	Cosworth BDA	Formula Atlantic	1:31.4
46	(United Kingdom) Clive Baker	McLaren M10B	Chevrolet	Formula 5000	1:31.5
47	(United Kingdom) Willie Green	Chevron B18	Cosworth FVC	Formula Two	1:33.7
48	(France) Hervé Bayard	Surtees TS8	Cosworth DFV	Formula One	1:34.5
49	(United Kingdom) Tony Dean	Porsche 908/02	Porsche F8	Sports car	1:34.7
50	(United Kingdom) David Purley	March 722	Cosworth BDA	Formula Two	1:34.9
51	(Switzerland) Pierre Soukry	McLaren M10B	Chevrolet	Formula 5000	1:36.5
52	(United Kingdom) Robert Lamplough	BRM P133	BRM	Formula One	1:38.5
53	(United Kingdom) Dave Berry	Brabham BT16/21B	Rover	Formula 5000	1:38.7
54	(United Kingdom) Brian Husbands	Mallock U2 Mk. 11	Ford	Clubmans	1:39.3
55	(United Kingdom) Albert Powell	Lola T70	Chevrolet	Sports car	1:41.0
56	(United Kingdom) Tony Birchenhough	Lola T212	Cosworth FVC	Sports car	1:41.3
57	(United Kingdom) David Saville-Peck	Costello SP7	Chevrolet	Can-Am	2:00.9
58	(United Kingdom) Tony Trimmer	Brabham BT38	Cosworth BDA	Formula Two	—

Key
Colour	Category
None	Formula One
Yellow	Formula Two
Red	Formula 5000
Blue	Formula Atlantic
Green	Sports car
Magenta	Can-Am
Cyan	Clubmans

=== Race ===
Pos	Driver	Constructor	Category	Laps	Time/Retired
1	(Brazil) Emerson Fittipaldi	Lotus-Cosworth	Formula One	118	2:50:49.1
2	(United Kingdom) Brian Redman	McLaren-Cosworth	Formula One	118	+47.6
3	(France) Henri Pescarolo	March-Cosworth	Formula One	116	+2 laps
4	(United Kingdom) Gerry Birrell	March-Cosworth	Formula Two	116	+2 laps
5	(United Kingdom) James Hunt	March-Cosworth	Formula Two	115	+3 laps
6	(United Kingdom) John Watson	Chevron-Cosworth	Formula Two	115	+3 laps
7	(United Kingdom) Alan Rollinson	Lola-Chevrolet	Formula 5000	112	+6 laps
8	(Denmark) Tom Belsø	Brabham-Cosworth	Formula Two	110	+8 laps
9	(United Kingdom) David Prophet	McLaren-Chevrolet	Formula 5000	109	+9 laps
10	(Belgium) Claude Bourgoignie	GRD-Cosworth	Formula Two	108	+10 laps
11 DNF	(United Kingdom) Steve Thompson	Surtees-Chevrolet	Formula 5000	107	Fuel
12	(Italy) Mario Casoni	Lola-Cosworth	Sports car	107	+11 laps
13	(United Kingdom) Keith Holland	Lola-Chevrolet	Formula 5000	106	+12 laps
14	(United Kingdom) Ronnie Mackay	Brabham-Cosworth	Formula Atlantic	101	+17 laps
15	(France) Jean-Pierre Beltoise	BRM	Formula One	101	+17 laps
16	(Australia) Tim Schenken	Brabham-Cosworth	Formula Two	97	+21 laps
17	(United Kingdom) Richard Scott	Brabham-Cosworth	Formula Two	96	+22 laps
18	(United Kingdom) Ray Allen	McLaren-Chevrolet	Formula 5000	95	+23 laps
19	(United Kingdom) John Wingfield	Brabham-Cosworth	Formula Two	95	+23 laps
20	(Australia) Alan Jones	GRD-Cosworth	Formula Two	93	+25 laps
21 DNF	(Argentina) Carlos Reutemann	Brabham-Cosworth	Formula Two	91	Engine
22 DNF	(United Kingdom) David Purley	March-Cosworth	Formula One	70	Engine
23 DNF	(New Zealand) Howden Ganley	BRM	Formula One	46	Radius arm
24 DQ	(Netherlands) Gijs van Lennep	Surtees-Chevrolet	Formula 5000	34	Push-start
25 DNF	(United Kingdom) Peter Westbury	Brabham-Cosworth	Formula Two	32	Overheating
26 DNF	(United Kingdom) Gordon Spice	Kitchmac-Chevrolet	Formula 5000	26	Overheating
27 DQ	(New Zealand) Graham McRae	McRae-Chevrolet	Formula 5000	14	Illegal maintenance
28 DNF	(South Africa) Jody Scheckter	McLaren-Cosworth	Formula Two	14	Overheating
29 DNF	(New Zealand) Vern Schuppan	March-Cosworth	Formula Two	9	Driveshaft
30 DNF	(Canada) John Cannon	March-Oldsmobile	Formula 5000	0	Engine
