= 1972 World Championship Victory Race =

- Non-championship race in the 1972 Formula One season

Race details
- Date: 22 October 1972
- Official name: John Player Challenge Trophy
- Location: Brands Hatch, Kent
- Course: Permanent racing facility
- Course length: 4.265 km (2.65 miles)
- Distance: 40 laps, 170.59 km (106 miles)

Pole position
Driver	(Brazil) Emerson Fittipaldi	Lotus-Ford
- Time: 1:20.8

Fastest lap
Driver	(Brazil) Emerson Fittipaldi	Lotus-Ford
- Time: 1:23.8

Podium
First	(France) Jean-Pierre Beltoise	BRM
Second	(Brazil) Carlos Pace	Surtees-Ford
Third	(Italy) Andrea de Adamich	Surtees-Ford

The 2nd World Championship Victory Race, formally the John Player Challenge Trophy, was a motor race, run to Formula One rules, held on 22 October 1972 at Brands Hatch, Kent. The race was run over 40 laps of the circuit. Jean-Pierre Beltoise won in his BRM P180. The entry included several Formula 5000 cars.

== Qualifying ==
Note: a blue background indicates a Formula 5000 entrant.

Pos.	No.	Driver	Constructor	Lap	Gap
1	1	(Brazil) Emerson Fittipaldi	Lotus-Ford	1:20.8	—
2	12	(Sweden) Ronnie Peterson	March-Ford	1:21.4	+0.6
3	8	(United Kingdom) Brian Redman	McLaren-Ford	1:21.8	+1.0
4	9	(United Kingdom) Mike Hailwood	Surtees-Ford	1:22.4	+1.6
5	10	(Brazil) Carlos Pace	Surtees-Ford	1:22.4	+1.6
6	7	(South Africa) Jody Scheckter	McLaren-Ford	1:22.4	+1.6
7	3	(France) Jean-Pierre Beltoise	BRM	1:23.0	+2.2
8	52	(New Zealand) Graham McRae	McRae-Chevrolet	1:23.2	+2.4
9	5	(United Kingdom) Peter Gethin	BRM	1:23.2	+2.4
10	23	(United Kingdom) John Watson	March-Ford	1:23.6	+2.8
11	20	(Argentina) Carlos Reutemann	Brabham-Ford	1:24.0	+3.2
12	11	(Italy) Andrea de Adamich	Surtees-Ford	1:24.0	+3.2
13	68	(Australia) Frank Gardner	Lola-Chevrolet	1:24.0	+3.2
14	17	(France) Henri Pescarolo	March-Ford	1:24.2	+3.4
15	19	(United Kingdom) Graham Hill	Brabham-Ford	1:24.2	+3.4
16	4	(Australia) Vern Schuppan	BRM	1:24.2	+3.4
17	14	(United Kingdom) Mike Beuttler	March-Ford	1:24.6	+3.8
18	60	(Canada) John Cannon	March-Oldsmobile	1:25.6	+4.8
19	39	(Netherlands) Gijs van Lennep	Surtees-Chevrolet	1:25.6	+4.8
20	42	(United Kingdom) Alan Rollinson	Lola-Chevrolet	1:25.8	+5.0
21	16	(New Zealand) Chris Amon	Politoys-Ford	1:26.4	+5.6
22	44	(United Kingdom) Steve Thompson	Surtees-Chevrolet	1:27.0	+6.2
23	38	(United Kingdom) Ray Allen	McLaren-Chevrolet	1:28.8	+8.0
24	36	(United Kingdom) Ian Ashley	Lola-Chevrolet	1:28.8	+8.0
25	48	(United Kingdom) Clive Santo	McLaren-Chevrolet	1:28.8	+8.0
26	34	(United Kingdom) Guy Edwards	McLaren-Chevrolet	1:29.2	+8.4
27	40	(United Kingdom) Tony Lanfranchi	McLaren-Chevrolet	1:29.8	+9.0
28	65	(United Kingdom) Clive Baker	McLaren-Chevrolet	1:30.2	+9.4
29	51	(United Kingdom) David Prophet	McLaren-Chevrolet	1:30.2	+9.4
30	63	(Belgium) Teddy Pilette	McLaren-Chevrolet	1:30.4	+9.6
31	22	(United Kingdom) David Purley	Connew-Ford	1:30.8	+10.0
32	35	(United States) Brett Lunger	McRae-Chevrolet	1:32.0	+11.2
33	31	(United Kingdom) Keith Holland	Chevron-Chevrolet	n/a †	-
34	67	(United Kingdom) Roger Williamson	Kitchmac-Chevrolet	1:33.8	+13.0
35	53	(Switzerland) Pierre Soukry	McLaren-Chevrolet	1:33.8	+13.0
36	16	(France) François Migault	March-Ford	6:56.2	+5:35.4
37	32	(United Kingdom) Tony Dean	McLaren-Chevrolet	No time	-
38	220	(United Kingdom) Chris Featherstone	Lola-Chevrolet	No time	-

† Holland's car was qualified by Brian Redman.

== Race ==
Pos.	No.	Driver	Entrant	Constructor	Time/Retired	Grid
1	3	(France) Jean-Pierre Beltoise	Marlboro BRM	BRM	59:47.8	7
2	10	(Brazil) Carlos Pace	Team Surtees	Surtees-Ford	+ 6.6 s	5
3	11	(Italy) Andrea de Adamich	Team Surtees	Surtees-Ford		12
4	4	(Australia) Vern Schuppan	Marlboro BRM	BRM	+ 1 lap	15
5	5	(United Kingdom) Peter Gethin	Marlboro BRM	BRM	+ 1 lap	9
6	23	(United Kingdom) John Watson	Hexagon of Highgate	March-Ford	+ 1 lap	10
7	8	(United Kingdom) Brian Redman	Yardley Team McLaren	McLaren-Ford	+ 1 lap	3
8	12	(Sweden) Ronnie Peterson	March Engineering	March-Ford	+ 1 lap	2
9	9	(United Kingdom) Mike Hailwood	Team Surtees	Surtees-Ford	+ 2 laps	4
10	20	(Argentina) Carlos Reutemann	Motor Racing Developments	Brabham-Ford	+ 2 laps	11
11	31	(United Kingdom) Keith Holland	Sid Taylor Racing	Chevron-Chevrolet	+ 2 laps	31
12	52	(New Zealand) Graham McRae	Crown Lynn Potteries	McRae-Chevrolet	+ 3 laps	8
13	36	(United Kingdom) Ian Ashley	WMG Marketing	Lola-Chevrolet	+ 3 laps	23
14	42	(United Kingdom) Alan Rollinson	Alan McKechnie Racing	Lola-Chevrolet	+ 3 laps	19
15	14	(United Kingdom) Mike Beuttler	Clarke-Mordaunt-Guthrie-Durlacher Racing	March-Ford	+ 3 laps	16
16	60	(Canada) John Cannon	Sid Taylor Racing	March-Oldsmobile	+ 3 laps	17
17	35	(United States) Brett Lunger	Jock Russell	McRae-Chevrolet	+ 4 laps	30
NC	7	(South Africa) Jody Scheckter	Yardley Team McLaren	McLaren-Ford	+ 6 laps	6
Ret	39	(Netherlands) Gijs van Lennep	Speed International Racing	Surtees-Chevrolet	Tyre wear	18
Ret	16	(New Zealand) Chris Amon	Frank Williams Racing Cars	Politoys-Ford	Engine	20
Ret	1	(Brazil) Emerson Fittipaldi	Team Lotus	Lotus-Ford	Oil pressure	1
Ret	67	(United Kingdom) Roger Williamson	Powrmatic H&V	Kitchmac-Chevrolet	Tyre wear	32
Ret	63	(Belgium) Teddy Pilette	Racing Team VDS	McLaren-Chevrolet	Valve gear	28
Ret	19	(United Kingdom) Graham Hill	Motor Racing Developments	Brabham-Ford	Gear linkage	14
Ret	38	(United Kingdom) Ray Allen	Speed International Racing	McLaren-Chevrolet	Stopped	22
Ret	65	(United Kingdom) Clive Baker	Clive Baker	McLaren-Chevrolet	Stopped	26
Ret	17	(France) Henri Pescarolo	Frank Williams Racing Cars	March-Cosworth	Steering damage	13
DNS	44	(United Kingdom) Steve Thompson	Alan Brodle	McLaren-Chevrolet	Engine	21
DNS	34	(United Kingdom) Guy Edwards	J. T. Butterworth	McLaren-Chevrolet	Engine	24
DNS	40	(United Kingdom) Tony Lanfranchi	Speed International Racing	McLaren-Chevrolet	Car not ready	25
DNS	51	(United Kingdom) David Prophet	David Prophet Racing	McLaren-Chevrolet	Car damaged	27
DNS	22	(United Kingdom) David Purley	LEC Refrigeration Racing	Connew-Ford	Electrical	29
DNS	68	(Australia) Frank Gardner	Lola Cars	Lola-Chevrolet	Withdrawn	
DNS	48	(United Kingdom) Clive Santo	Clive Santo	McLaren-Chevrolet	Engine	
DNS	16	(France) François Migault	Écurie Volant Shell	March-Ford	Practice accident	
DNQ	53	(Switzerland) Pierre Soukry	Pierre Soukry	McLaren-Chevrolet		
DNQ	32	(United Kingdom) Tony Dean	A.G. Dean	McLaren-Chevrolet		
DNQ	220	(United Kingdom) Chris Featherstone	Chris Featherstone	Lola-Chevrolet		

Previous race: 1972 Italian Republic Grand Prix	Formula One non-championship races 1972 season	Next race: 1973 Race of Champions
Previous race: 1971 World Championship Victory Race	World Championship Victory Race	Next race: None
