= Ferrari Berlinetta Boxer =

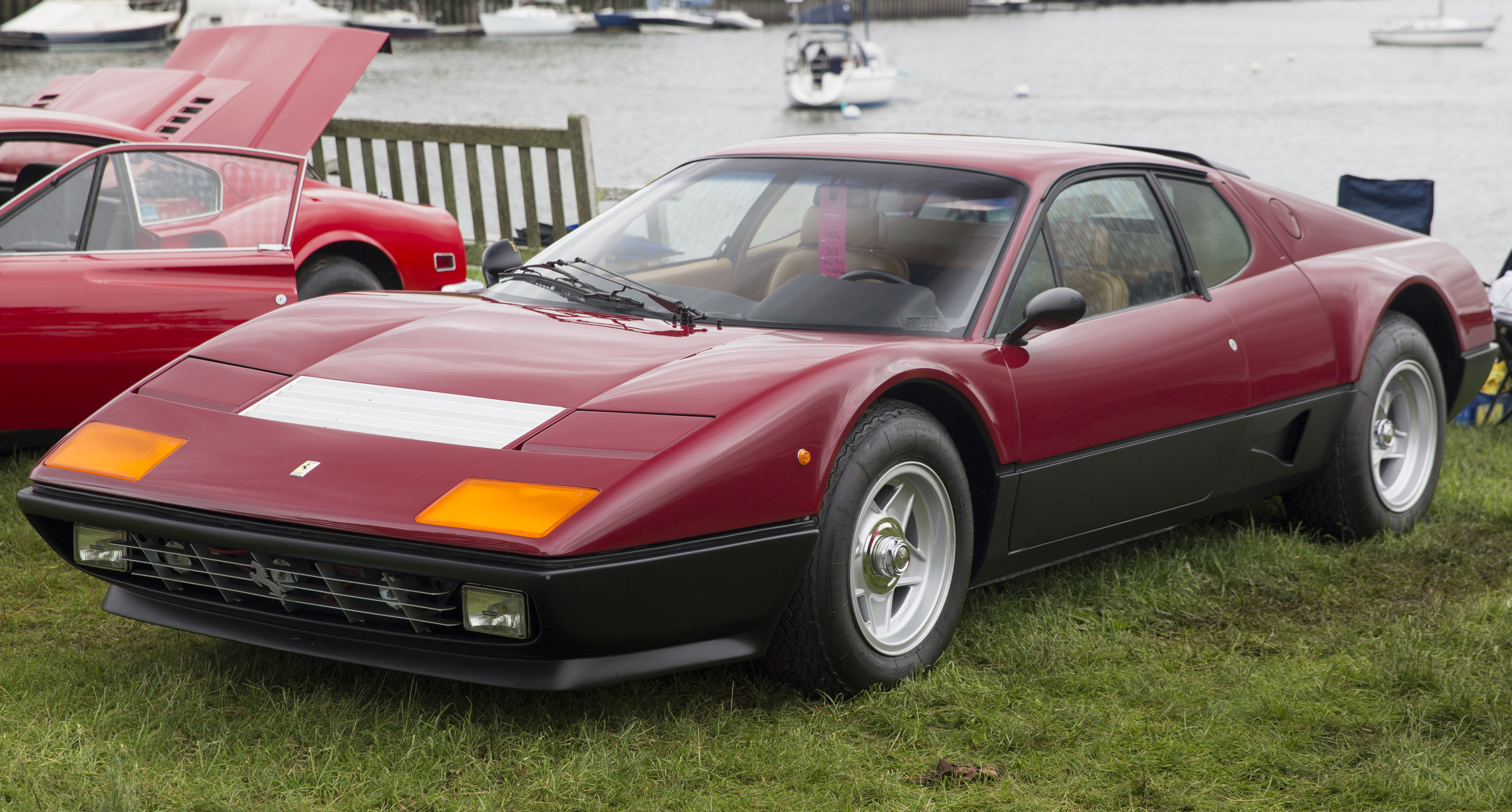
- Ferrari 512 BB

Overview
- Manufacturer: Ferrari
- Production: 1973–1984; 2,323 produced
- Assembly: Italy: Maranello
- Designer: Leonardo Fioravanti at Pininfarina

Body and chassis
- Class: Sports car (S)
- Body style: 2-door berlinetta
- Layout: Rear mid-engine, rear-wheel-drive

Powertrain
- Engine: 4.4 L Tipo F102 A flat-12; 4.9 L Tipo F102 B flat-12; 4.9 L Tipo F110 A flat-12
- Transmission: 5-speed manual

Dimensions
- Wheelbase: 2,500 mm (98.4 in)
- Length: 4,400 mm (173.2 in)
- Width: 1,830 mm (72.0 in)
- Height: 1,120 mm (44.1 in)

Chronology
- Predecessor: Ferrari 365 GTB/4
- Successor: Ferrari Testarossa

The Ferrari Berlinetta Boxer (BB) is a series of sports cars produced by Ferrari in Italy between 1973 and 1984. The BB was designed by Leonardo Fioravanti at Pininfarina. The first BB model, the 365 GT4 BB, replaced the front engined Daytona and was the first in a series of road-going Ferraris equipped with a mid-mounted flat-twelve engine. The 365 GT4 BB was succeeded in 1976 by the BB 512, equipped with a larger displacement engine, then by the fuel-injected BB 512i in 1981. The series was discontinued in 1984 when the BB 512i was replaced by the Testarossa, which used a revised version of the flat-twelve engine.

== Background ==
Production of the BB was a major step for Enzo Ferrari. He felt that a mid-engined road car would be too difficult for his buyers to handle, and it took many years for his engineers to convince him to adopt the layout. This attitude began to change as the marque lost its racing dominance in the late 1950s to mid-engined competitors. As a result, the rear-mid-engined 246 P Formula 1 car was introduced in 1960, followed by the Dino SP racing sports prototypes in 1961. In 1963, the company also moved its V12 engines to the rear with its P and LM racing cars.

Introduced in 1967, the Dino 206 GT and 246 GT/GTS road cars were the first road-going Ferraris to use the rear-mid-engined layout, albeit under the lower-cost Dino marque. Ferrari's flagship V12-powered road cars remained front-engined through the early 1970s, with the 365 GTB/4 Daytona and 365 GTC/4 introduced in 1968 and 1971, respectively. In 1973, Ferrari introduced the 365 GT4 Berlinetta Boxer as its first mid-engined 12-cylinder road car.

Ferrari first used the flat-12 engine layout in racing cars, starting with the 1964 512 F1. The 512 F1's 1.5 liter engine was designed by Mauro Forghieri, technical director of the racing department. This engine design was further developed in several Formula One and sports prototype racing cars, including the 1968 212 E, 1970-75 312B, and 1971 312PB. These racing engine designs became the basis for the road-going flat 12 engine introduced in the 365 GT4 BB.

== Design and development ==
Following the introduction of the production 365 GTB/4 Daytona in 1969, Ferrari engineers led by Dr. Ing. Angelo Bellei began work on a successor, the 365 GT4 BB. Though it shared its numerical designation with the 365 GTB/4 Daytona, the 365 GT4 BB was radically different in layout than the front-engined 365 GTB/4. The new car was to have rear mid-mounted flat-12 engine, arranged longitudinally. While this configuration was unprecedented among Ferrari road cars, the design team drew upon the existing chassis design of the mid-engine 250 LM and Dino 206/246, as well as the flat-12 engines developed for the Scuderia Ferrari beginning in 1964. The first prototype 365 GT4 BB was unveiled at the 1971 Turin Motor Show. Prototypes were further refined by an extensive road and track testing program led by Ferrari test driver Giorgio Enrico. As Ferrari engineers already had considerable experience with both the layout and engine design, development work proceeded rapidly and only small changes were seen between the early prototypes and the first production 365 GT4 BB. The production 365 GT4 BB was first offered for sale in 1973.

=== Engine and transmission ===
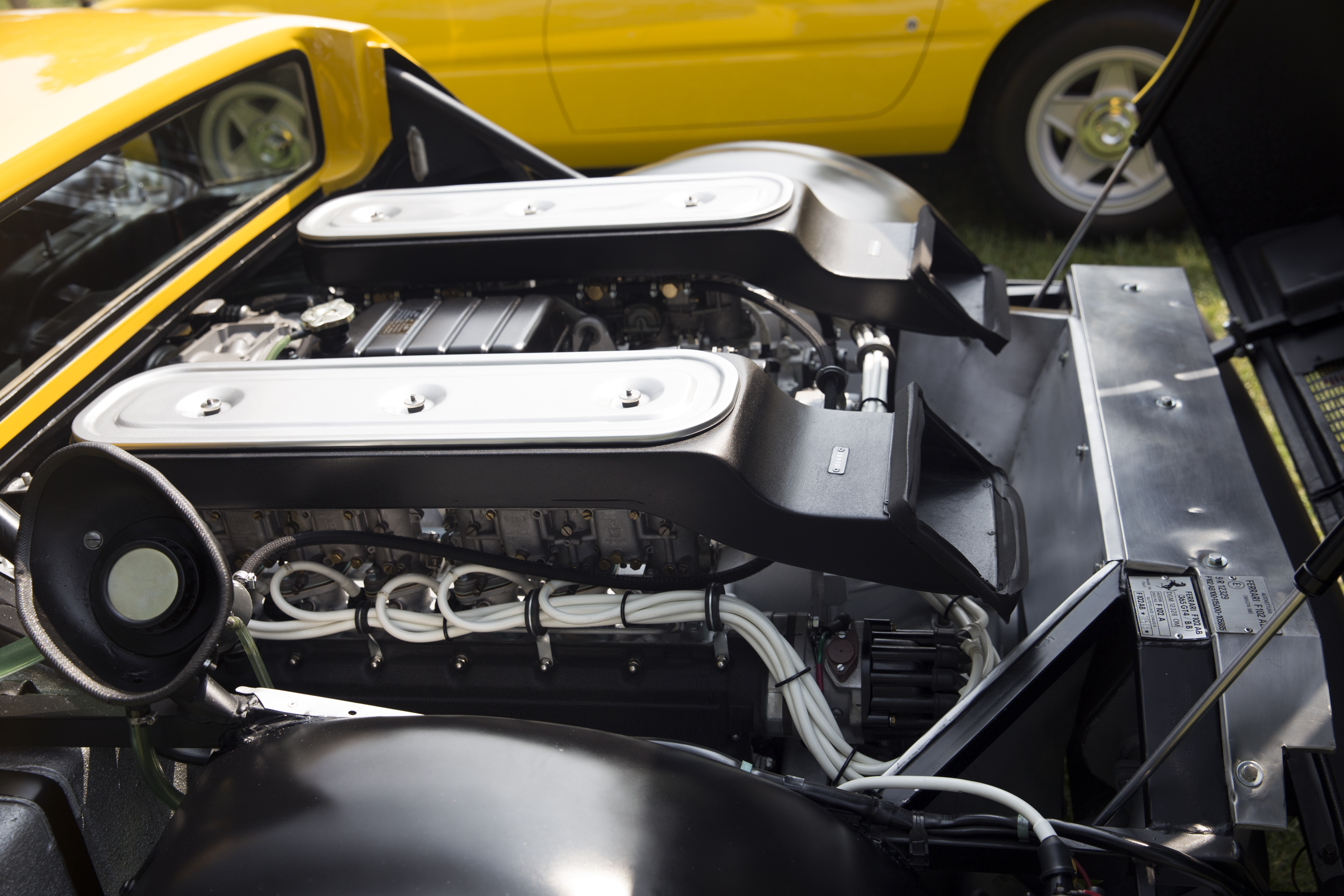
F102 A engine in a 1974 365 GT4 BB

Dr. Ing. Giuliano de Angelis oversaw the development of the Tipo F102A engine used in the 365 GT4 BB. This engine was derived from both the Mauro Forghieri-designed Tipo 001 3.0-litre flat-12 engine used in the 1969 Ferrari 312B Formula One car and the roadgoing 365 GTB/4 engine. The total displacement of the new engine was 4390.35 cc with a bore of 81 mm and a stroke of 71 mm, dimensions which matched the 365 GTB/4 engine.

While the "Berlinetta Boxer" name has been used by both Ferrari and the press to describe BB-series cars, this engine was not a true boxer engine. In the Tipo F102 A and its derivatives, each pair of opposing pistons share the same crank pin and move in the same direction during operation. In a boxer engine, pairs of opposing pistons move in opposite directions. On this point, Ferrari engine designer Mauro Forghieri stated "Please, don't call it boxer. Technically, it is correct to say that this engine is a flat-12, or has 12 cylinders with the heads at a vee angle of 180°."

The engine block was constructed of Silumin alloy, with cast iron cylinder liners. Pistons were light alloy and the crankshaft was forged steel. The cylinder head design was very similar to that of the 365 GTB/4, incorporating dual overhead camshafts and two valves per cylinder. The four camshafts were driven by two timing belts, which reduced noise and weight compared to the timing chains used on earlier 12 cylinder Ferrari engines. Air and fuel were supplied via four 3-bbl Weber 40 IF 3C carburetors. The ignition system consisted of a single Magneti Marelli distributor and two coils. The engine was lubricated by a wet sump, which was replaced by a dry sump in the BB512 to avoid oil starvation issues. According to de Angelis and Bellei, the first prototype F102 A engine produced 380 bhp at 7,100 rpm and propelled the prototype to 302 km/h (188 mph) during testing. Ferrari brochures reported the production version of the F102 A engine produced 360 bhp at 7,500 rpm and 311 ft/lb of torque at 4,500 rpm, although figures reported in other factory and press publications vary.

The 365 GT4 BB was equipped with a five-speed manual transaxle and limited-slip differential. The transmission and differential were placed directly underneath the engine, alongside the oil sump. The Fichtel & Sachs single-plate dry clutch was located at the rear of the engine. Power reached the transmission via a set of drop gears and a horizontal shaft. While this layout increased the vertical height of the engine and transmission assembly and raised the car's center of gravity, it shortened the overall length of the assembly. This was advantageous for packaging reasons, as a compact engine/transmission meant the chassis could have a short overall wheelbase as well as a comfortable, spacious cabin.

The engine design of the Tipo F102 A continued to be developed by Ferrari after the introduction of the 365 GT4 BB. It led to the creation of a family of road-going Ferrari flat-12 engines, including the F102 B (used in the BB 512), F110 A (used in the BBi 512) and the engines of the Testarossa, 512TR and F512M. These later engines had an overall displacement of 5 liters.

=== Styling ===
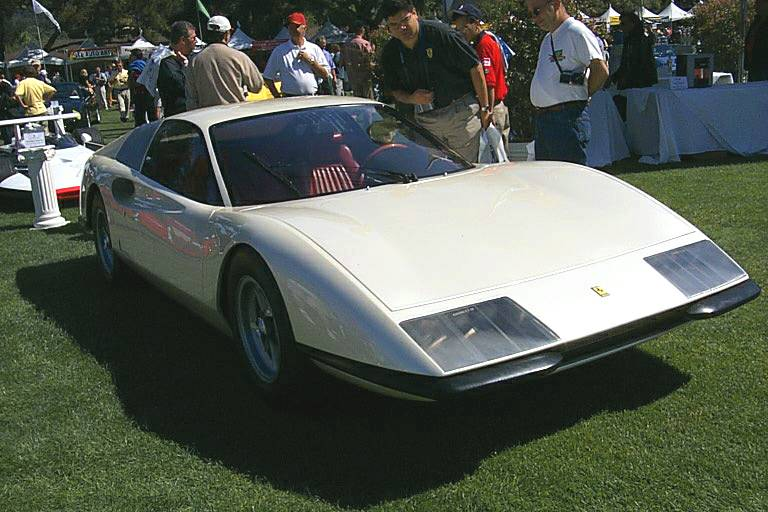
Pininfarina's Ferrari P6 concept car influenced the design of the 365 GT4 BB

The body of the 365 GT4 BB was styled at Pininfarina, supervised by Leonardo Fioravanti. The design was influenced by the Ferrari P6 Berlinetta Speciale, a one-off concept car created by Pininfarina in 1968. The first 365 GT4 BB prototype was presented to the public at the 1971 Turin Auto Show. It had a low, wedge shaped nose with hidden headlamps, a steeply raked windscreen and a wide rear section truncated by a vertical tail. The design was refined using wind tunnel testing at Pininfarina's facility. As a result of these aerodynamic studies, a spoiler was placed behind and above the passenger compartment, spanning the two buttresses or sail panels on either side of the engine cover. This spoiler was intended to reduce drag, improve stability and direct air into the intakes on the top of the engine cover.

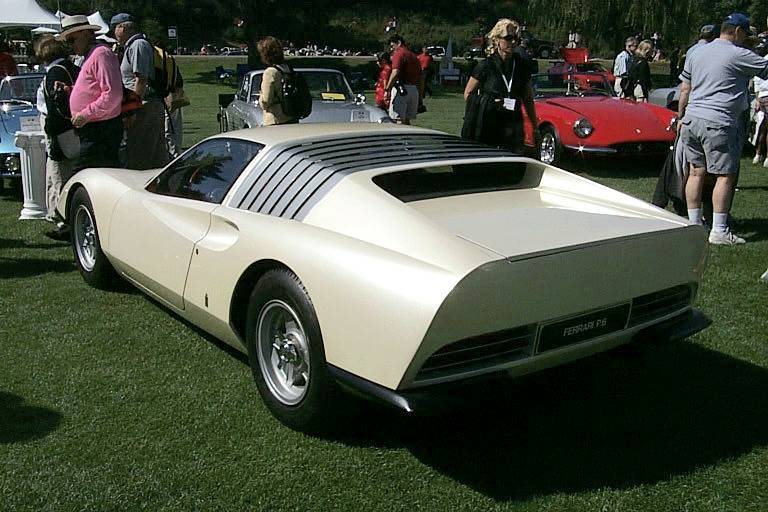
Ferrari P6 concept rear

The central section of the bodywork was constructed of steel, while the front and rear covers and door were constructed of aluminum alloy. The front and rear lower valences/bumpers were fiberglass. The front and rear covers are a clamshell design, with hinges allowing the front cover to pivot forward and the rear engine cover to pivot rearward. This allowed easier maintenance access to the engine and use of the small front luggage compartment.

The 1971 prototype's paint scheme was designed to lower and reduce the visual mass of the car when seen in profile. To this effect, the bodywork was split with a horizontal seam near the top of the wheel rims and everything below this point was painted satin black, including both front and rear bumpers. This two-tone paint scheme would carry over into production BB models. Ferrari later offered the two-tone paint scheme as an option on other models such as the 308, where it was commonly referred to as "Boxer" paint.

The bodywork of the 1971 Turin Auto Show prototype closely represented that of the production 365 GT4 BB, with some small differences. The prototype had four tail lamps, while the production 365 GT4 BB had six. The prototype's fuel filler was placed below the rear quarter window, but this was relocated to a buttress/sail panel in the production version. This design was carried over with only minor changes through the final model of the series, the BB 512i.

=== Chassis and suspension ===
The 365 GT4 BB chassis was constructed of steel tubing, as was standard Ferrari practice at the time. According to lead engineer Dr. Ing. Angelo Bellei, the chassis design was directly influenced by the chassis of the 250 LM and the Dino 206/246. While the central bodywork formed a semi-monocoque with the steel chassis, the front and rear bodywork was unstressed and only supported by light subframes. The front bodywork and subframe was designed to deform and absorb energy during a crash. Crash safety was also improved by the presence of two large diameter tubes which ran diagonally from the engine cradle to the roof, providing extra strength during a rollover crash.

All four wheels had double wishbone independent suspension, with a single coil spring and shock absorber for each front wheel and a pair for each rear wheel. Dual anti-roll bars, non-powered rack and pinion steering and four wheel disc brakes were also equipped. The 365 GT4 BB was fitted with Michelin XWX tires, with front and rear tires both sized 215 70 VR 15. Later models would use a staggered configuration with wider rear tires.

== Production history ==
=== 365 GT4 BB ===
365 GT4 BB
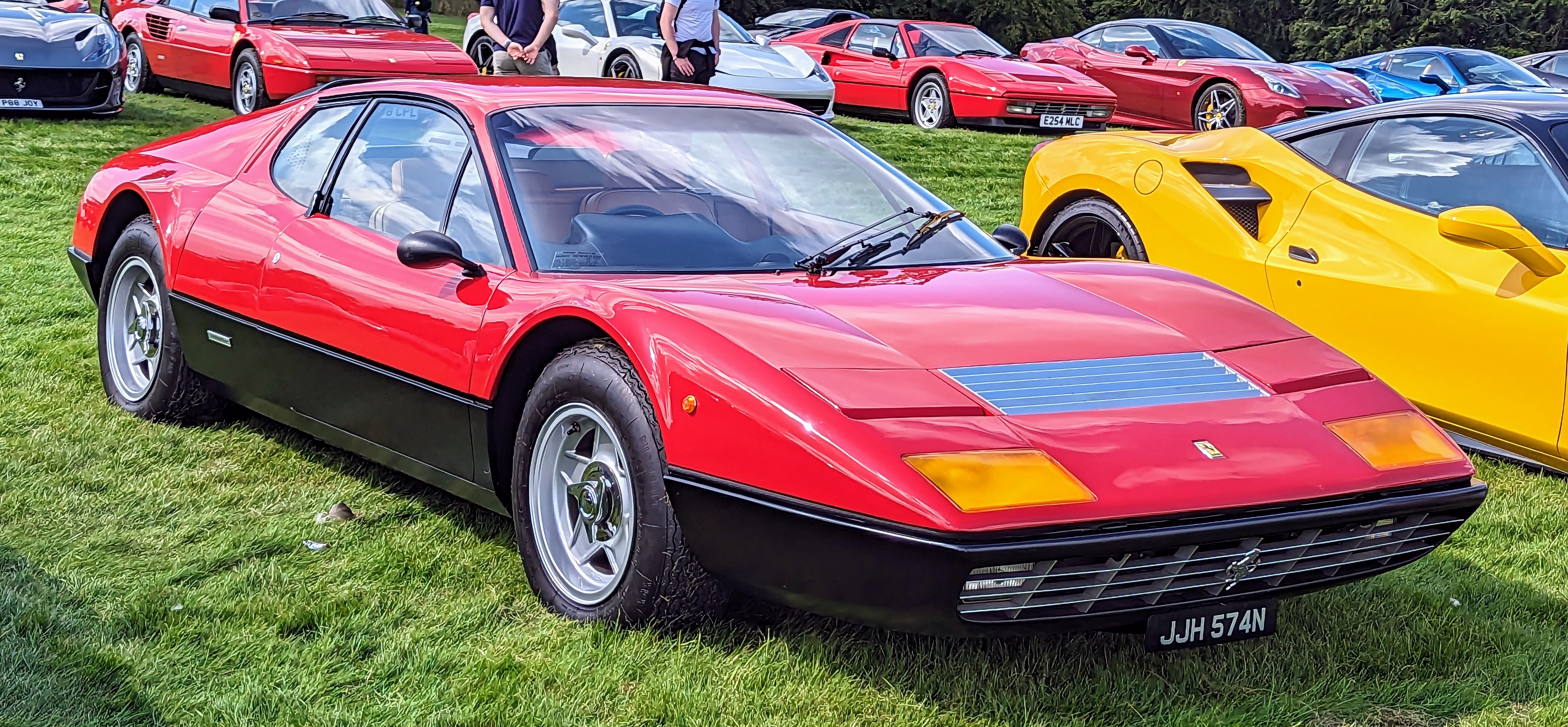

Overview
- Production: 1973–1976; 387 produced

Powertrain
- Engine: 4.4 L F102 A flat-12

The production version of the 365 GT4 BB was introduced at the 1973 Paris Motor Show. The start of production coincided with the 1973 oil crisis, and as a result initial demand was low. Ferrari initially planned a limited production run of only 25 cars. Production began slowly, with only two dozen cars constructed during the first year of production. Demand gradually increased and later cars were produced at the rate of one per day. In total, 387 examples were built between 1973 and 1976, making it the rarest of all Berlinetta Boxer models. 88 were right-hand drive, with 58 of these intended for the UK market. Production 365 GT4 BB bodywork was constructed by Scaglietti and final assembly took place at Ferrari's factory in Maranello.

Factory list price in 1973 was 18,290,000 Lire. By 1976, the price increased to 24,375,000 L., approximately US$30,000. List price in the UK was £17,487 in 1975. Air conditioning was optional, but most buyers selected it. Buyers could choose the two-tone "Boxer" paint with a black lower half, or conventional single color paint.

Contemporary press reception to the 365 GT4 BB was positive and journalists praised the car's handling and straight line performance. Road & Track tested a 365 GT4 BB in June 1975. The clutch in their test car slipped, but they still measured 0-60 mph in 7.2 seconds, 0-100 mph in 14.8 seconds and a standing quarter mile time of 15.5 seconds. R&T testers reached a top speed of 175 mph, making the 365 GT4 BB the fastest road car tested at the time. A later test of a fully functional car in the November 1976 issue of Car and Driver recorded 0-60 mph in 6.1 seconds and 0-100 mph in 14.1 seconds.

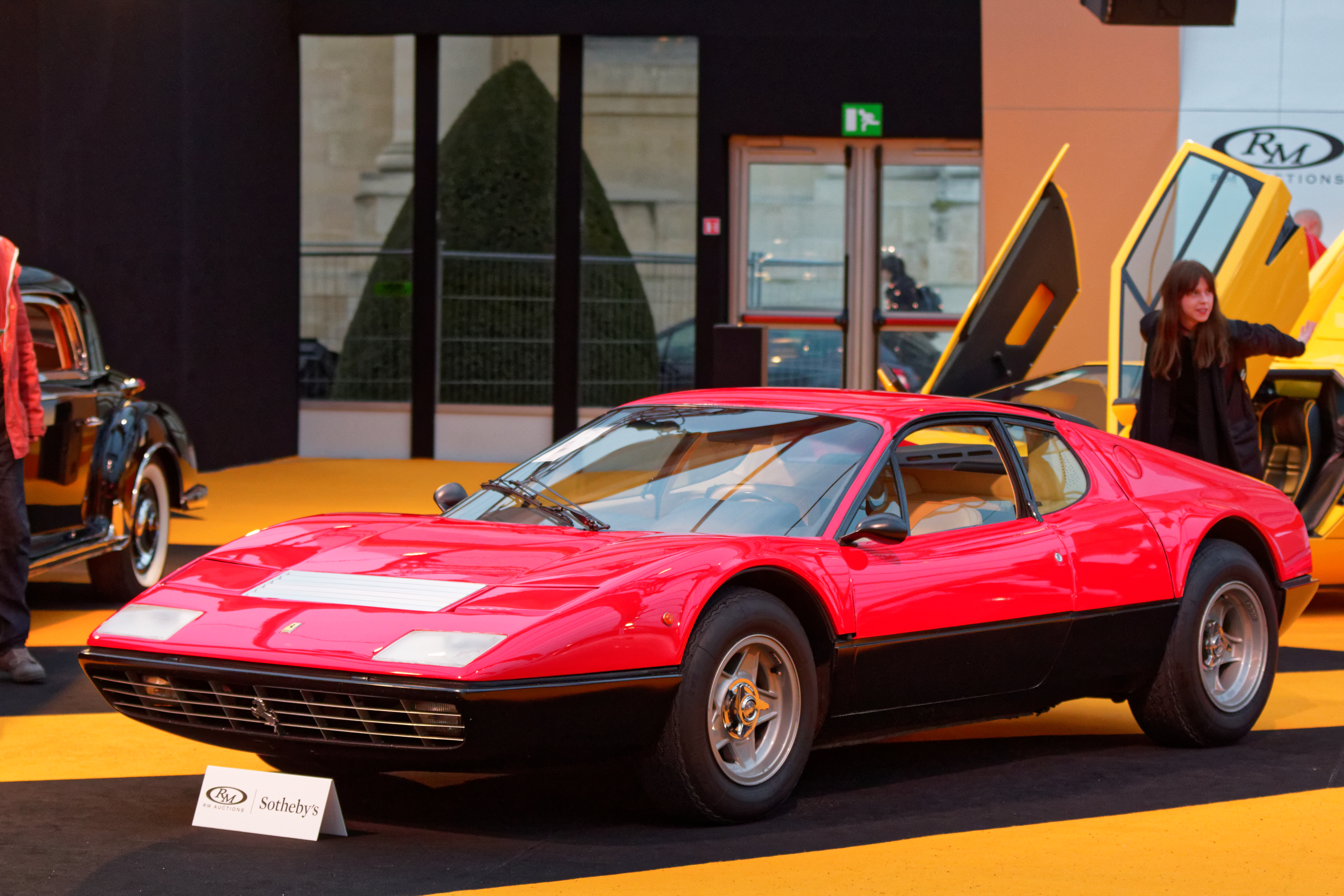
Front of 365 GT4 BB. Front turn signal lenses were amber or clear depending on delivery market.

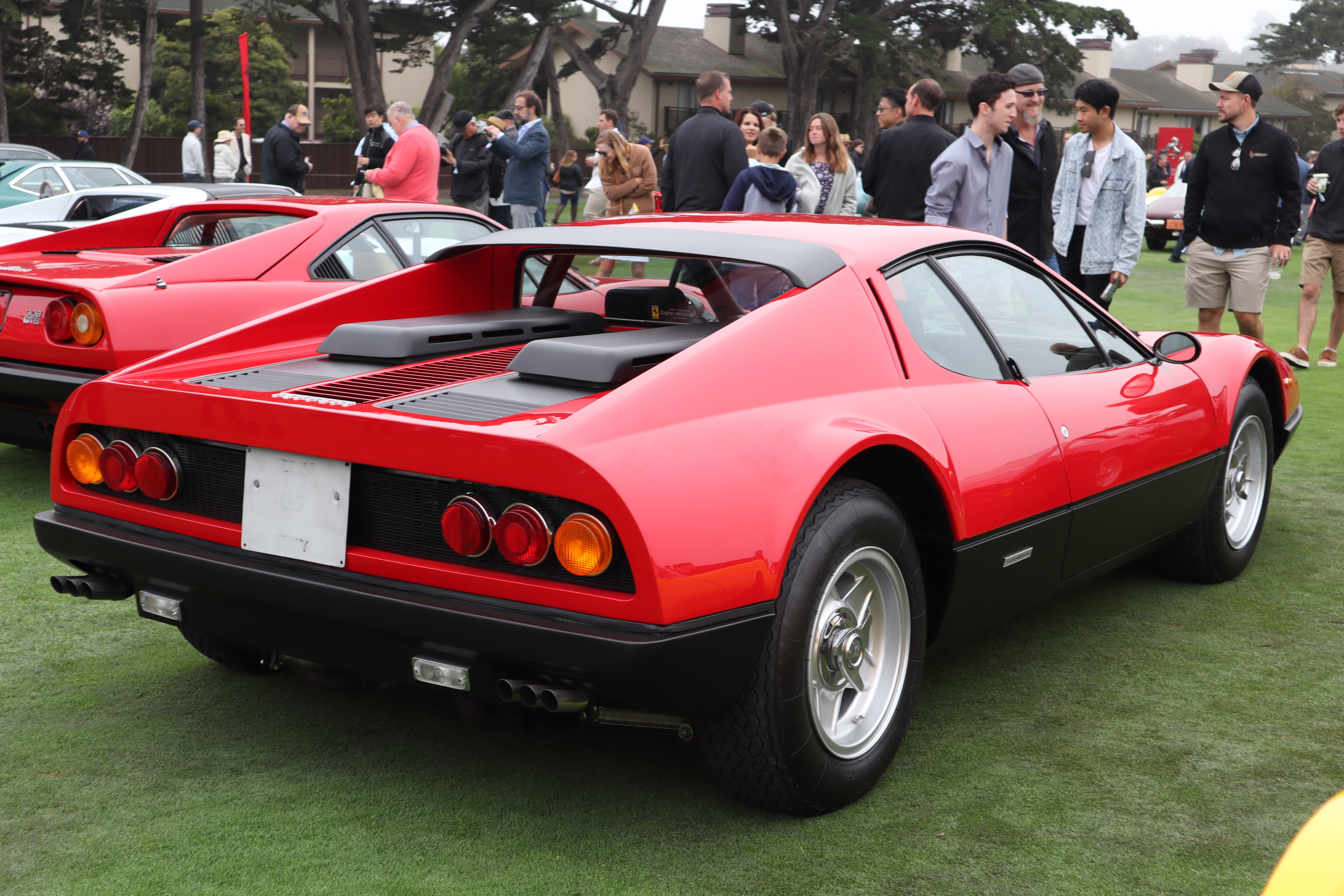
Rear of 365 GT4 BB. Six taillights and six exhaust outlets distinguish this model.

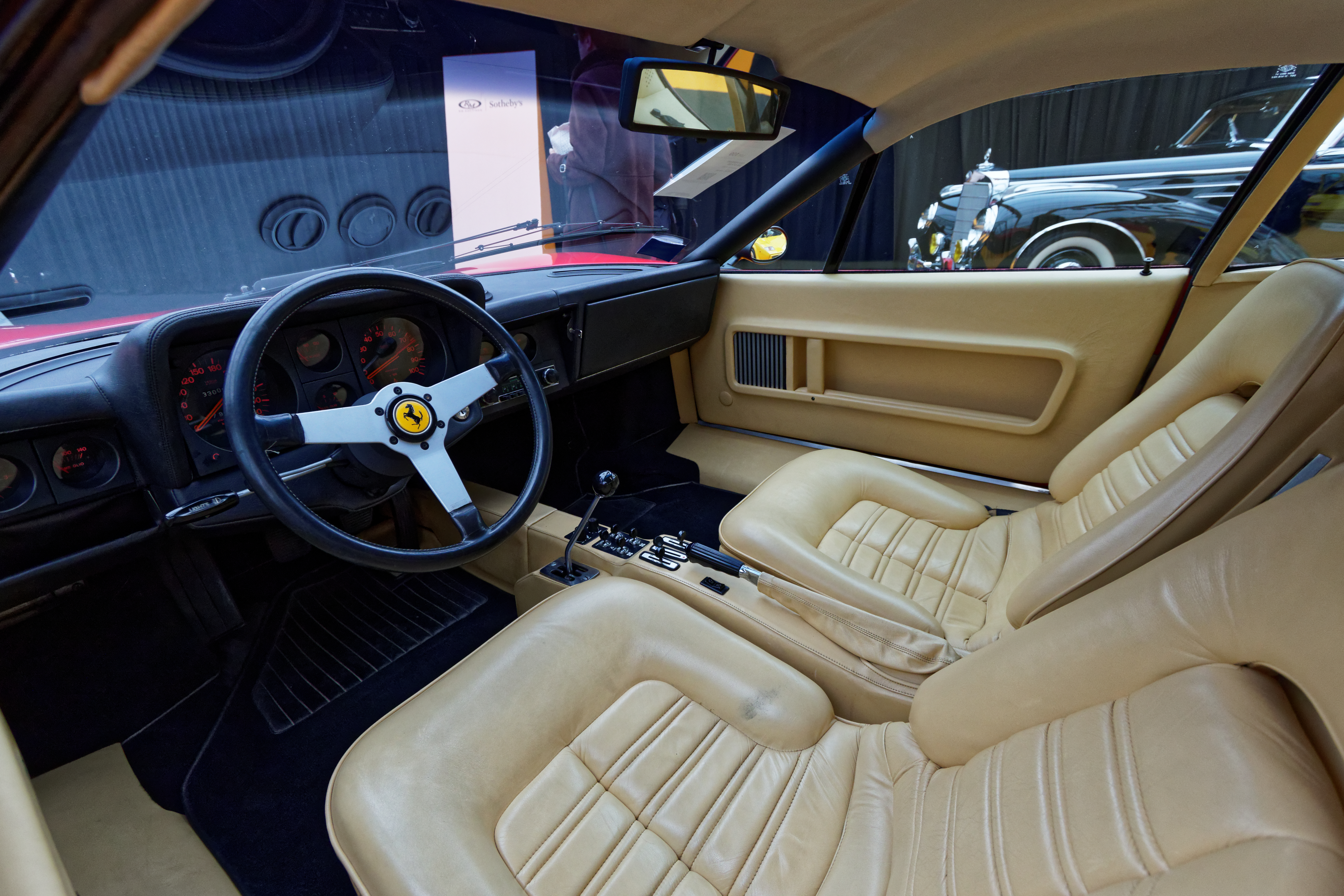
Interior of 365 GT4 BB

=== BB 512 ===
BB 512
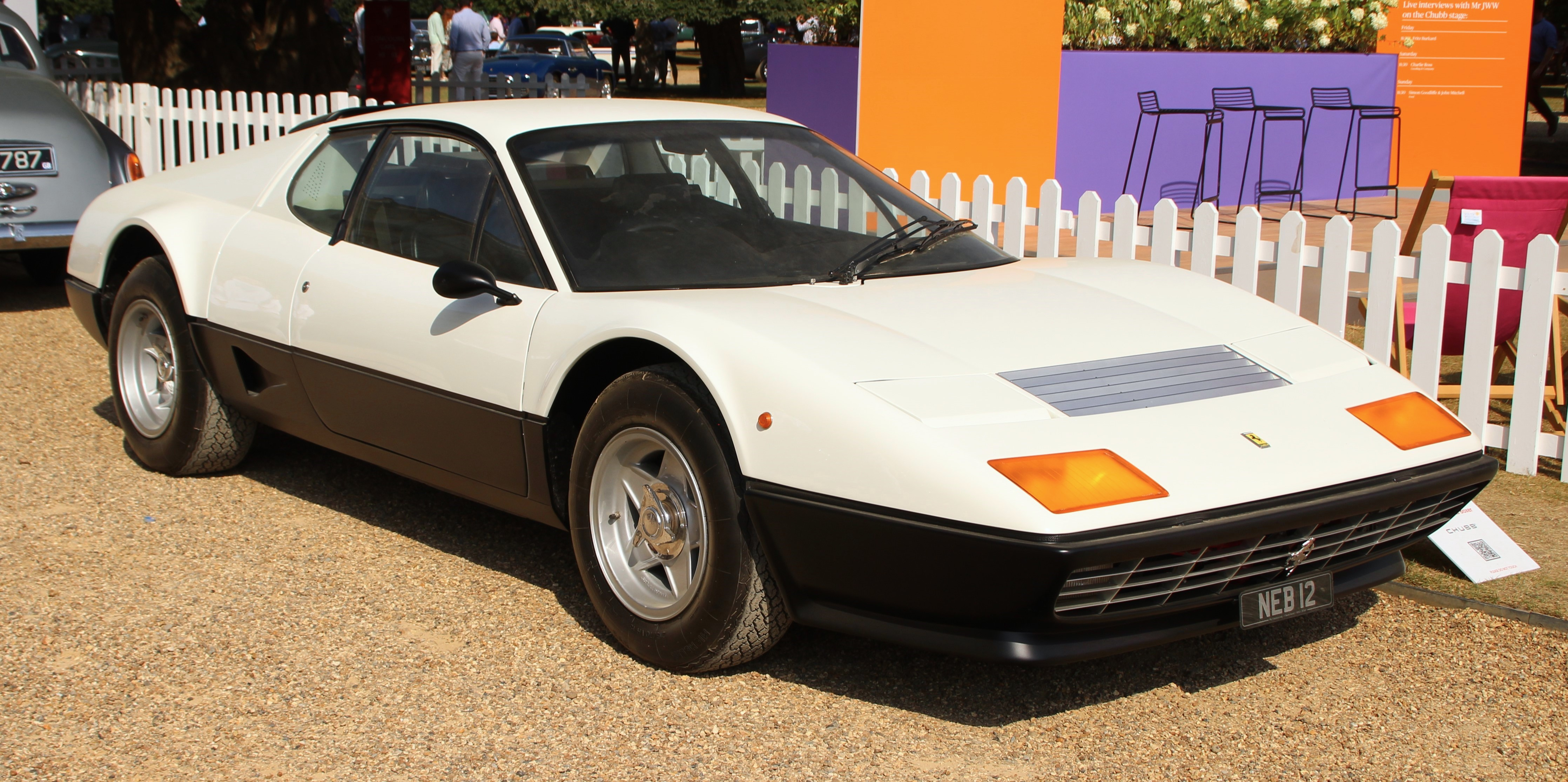

Overview
- Production: 1976–1981; 929 produced

Powertrain
- Engine: 4.9 L F102 B flat-12

The 365 GT4 BB was replaced by the BB 512 (also known as the 512 BB) in 1976. The name 512 referred to the car's 5 litre, 12 cylinder engine, resurrecting the name of the earlier Ferrari 512 racer. This was a deviation from Ferrari's established practice of naming 12-cylinder road cars (as the 365 BB) after their individual cylinder displacement. The new model was first shown to the public at the 1976 Paris Motor Show.

The Tipo F102 B engine was enlarged to 4943 cc. Bore and stroke were now 82 mm x 78 mm and the compression ratio was increased to 9.2:1. Ferrari sales brochures claimed a peak power output of 360 bhp (270 kW); later Ferrari publications revised this to 340 bhp (250 kW). This was lower than the claimed power of the 365 GT4 BB, but the BB 512 reached peak power at 6200 rpm, lower than the 7000 rpm peak of the previous model. Torque slightly increased to 331 ft⋅lb (449 N⋅m) at 4300 rpm. Despite the loss in peak power, the flatter torque curve of the 5 liter engine provided a smoother and more user friendly power delivery. The larger displacement engine also allowed Ferrari to meet more stringent pollution and noise regulations without losing performance.

Autocar tested a BB512 in May 1978, when they measured 0-60 mph in 6.2 seconds and reached a speed of 163 mph (262 km/h). Although these figures are not as high as those published in other road tests, it was listed in the Guinness Book of Records as the world's fastest independently road-tested production car.

A dual plate clutch handled the added torque and eased the pedal effort. Dry sump lubrication prevented oil starvation in hard cornering. In order to improve grip, the rear Michelin XWX tires were increased in width to 225 70 VR 15 and the rear wheels were widened from 7.5 inches to 9 inches wide. The front tires remained 215 70 VR 15 on 7.5 inch wide wheels, as on the 365 GT4 BB. The chassis remained unaltered, but these wider rear tires meant the rear track increased to 1563 mm and the rear bodywork was widened accordingly.

External differentiators included a new chin spoiler upfront, incorporated in the bumper. At top speed the nose of 365 GT4 BB lifted 1 inch; the BB 512's chin spoiler eliminated this tendency. NACA ducts were added behind the door on each side, provided cooling for the exhaust system and rear brakes. At the rear, there were now twin tail lights and exhaust pipes each side, instead of triple units as on the 365 GT4 BB. The panel between the taillights was now slats, instead of black mesh. The number of vents in the engine cover increased, in order to improve engine cooling.

List price in the UK was £23,868 in 1977.

929 examples of the BB 512 were produced between 1976 and 1981.

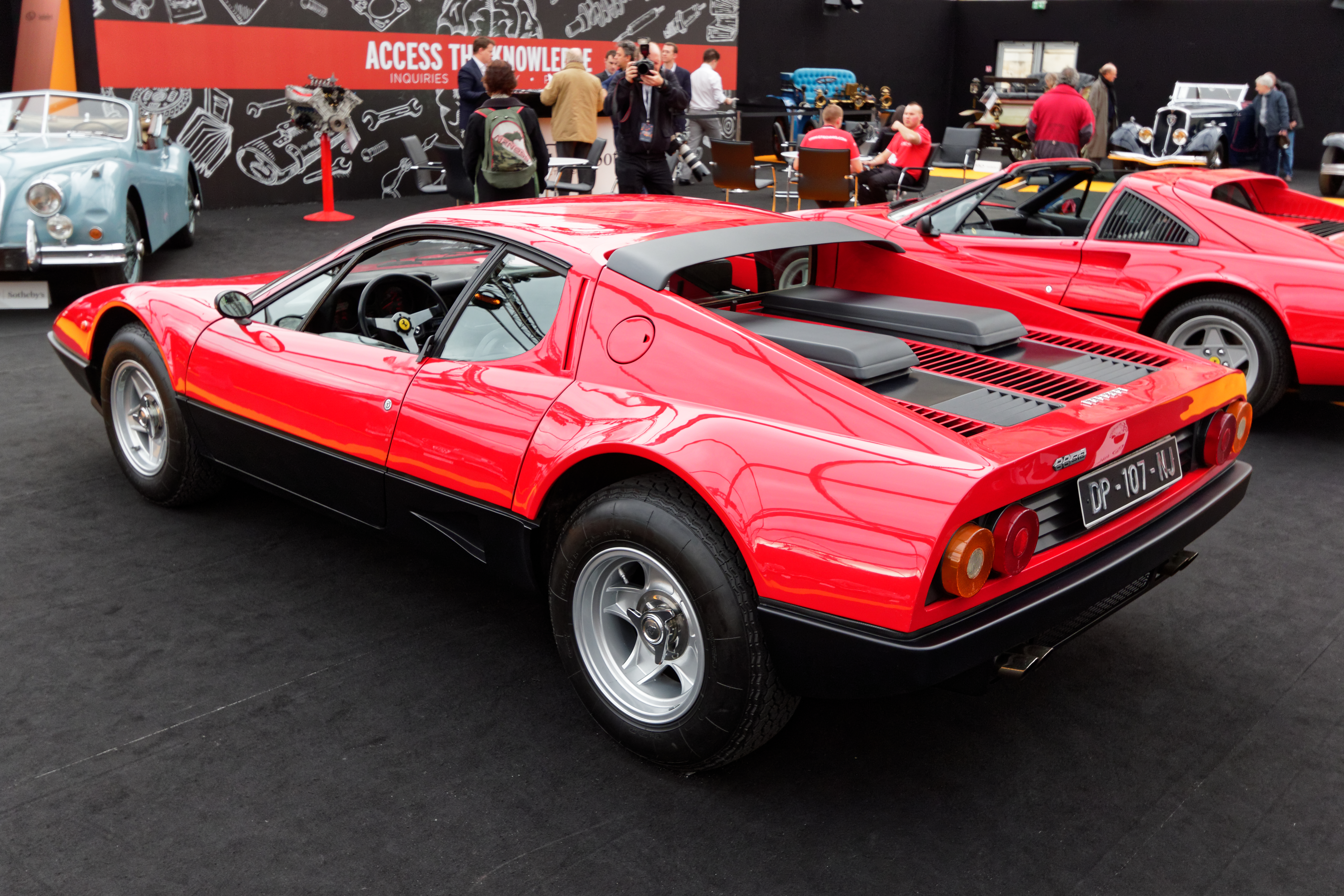
Rear view of BB 512, showing revised engine venting, taillights, exhaust and NACA duct.

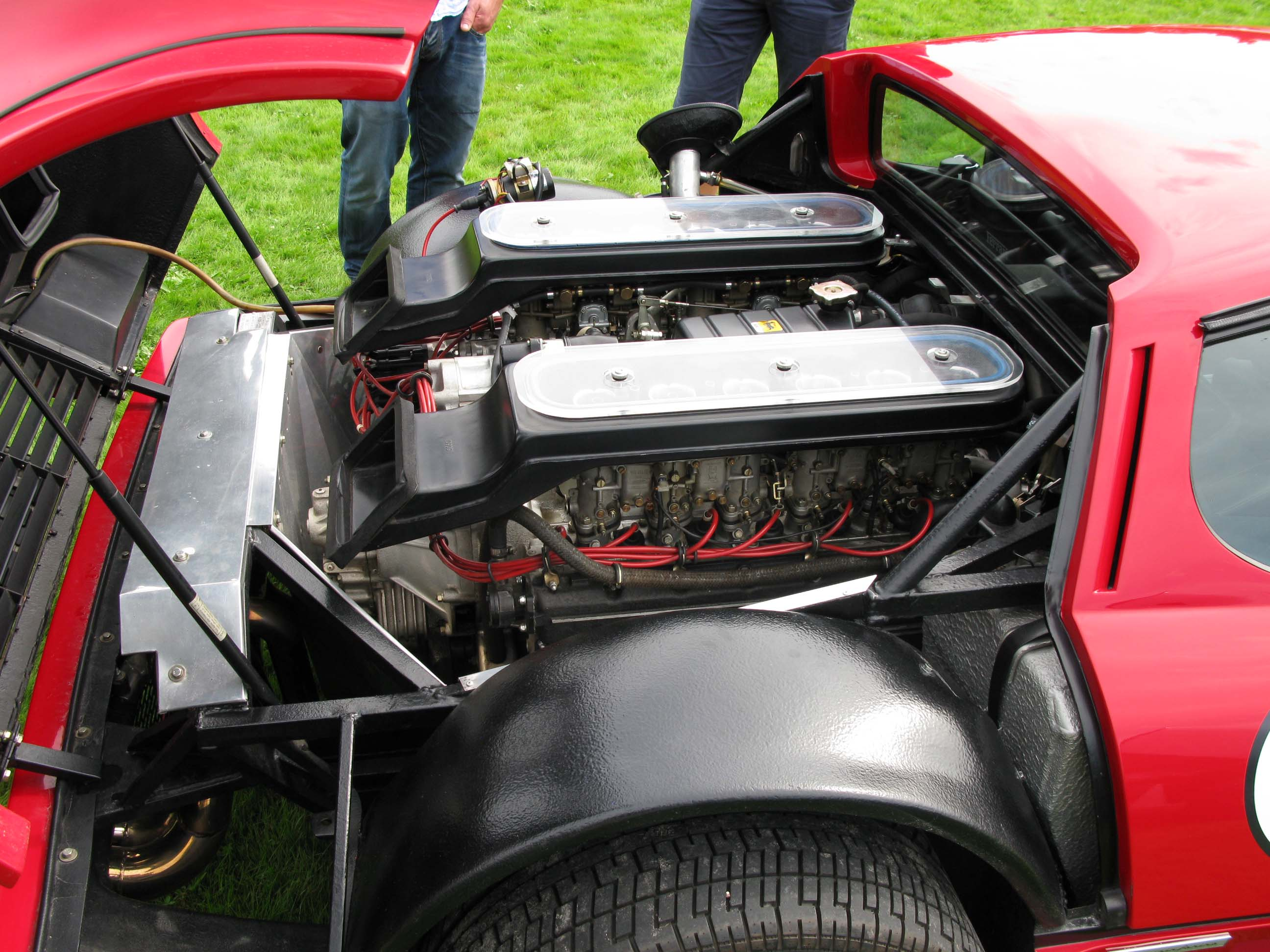
F102 B engine in BB 512.

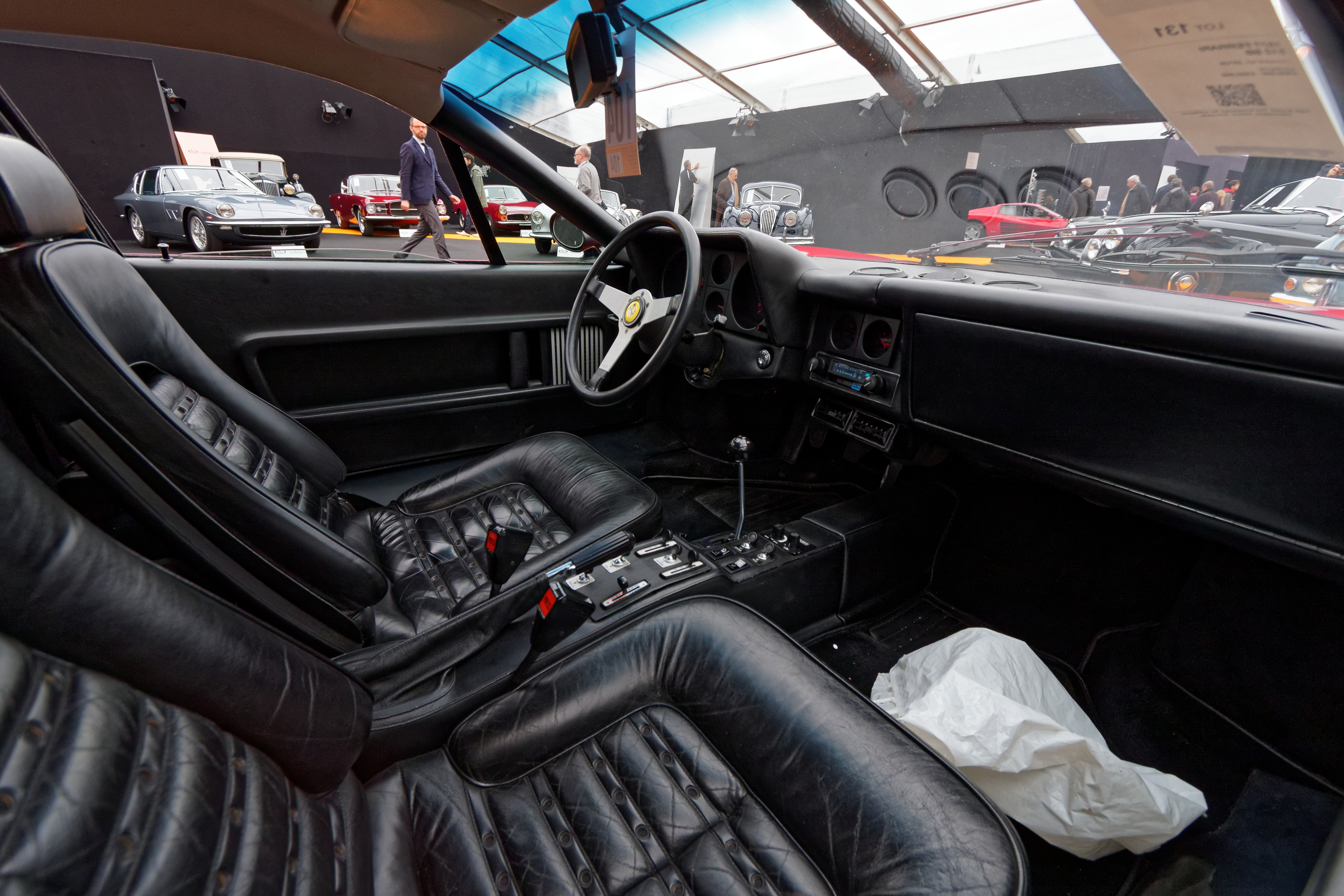
BB 512 interior

=== BB 512i ===
BB 512i
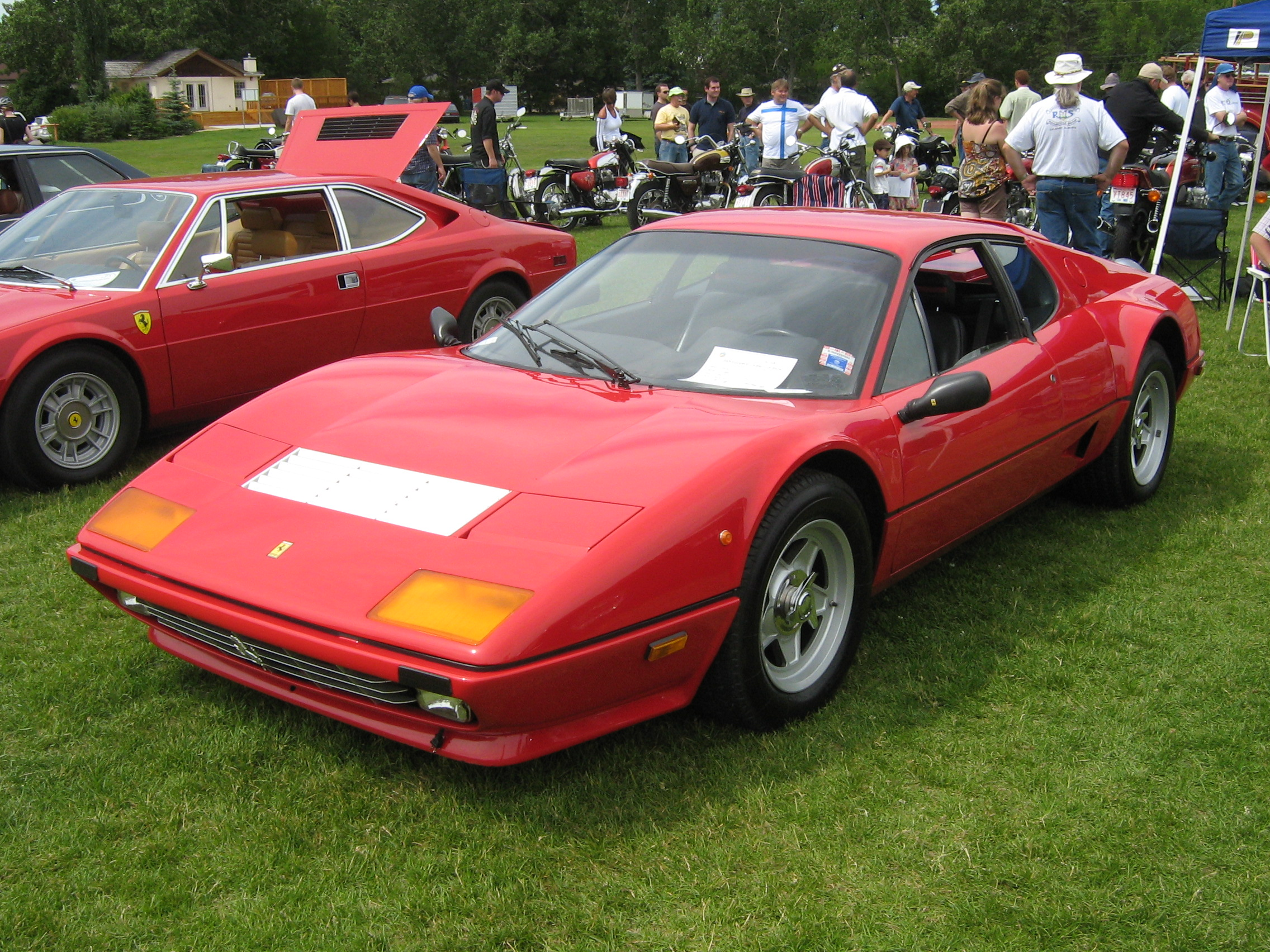

Overview
- Production: 1981–1984; 1,007 produced

Powertrain
- Engine: 4.9 L F110 A FI flat-12

The BB 512i (also known as the 512 BBi) was introduced in 1981 and was the last of the series. The Tipo F110 A engine now incorporated Bosch K-Jetronic CIS fuel injection. The fuel injected motor produced cleaner emissions and offered a better balance of performance and driveability. Camshaft timing was changed and the Magneti Marelli "Dinoplex" electronic ignition system now had a built-in rev limiter. Claimed peak power output was 340 bhp (250 kW) at 6,000 rpm, making the BB 512i the least powerful model in the series.

External differentiators from the BB 512 besides badging include small white running lights in the front fascia, a front grille that exposed the driving lamps, and a revised rear valence incorporating red fog lamps outboard of the exhaust pipes. Engine cover venting was also revised.

The BB 512i used Michelin TRX metric-sized tires and wheels, replacing the Michelin XWX tires used on earlier BB models. Tires were sized 240/55 VR 415 front and rear, with wheels sized 180 TR 415 front and 210 TR 415 rear.

List price of the BB 512i in the UK was £39,991 in 1981. Air conditioning, power windows, and a stereo were all standard equipment. Buyers could specify an optional interior trimmed with Ermenegildo Zegna wool cloth in the seats, door panels and headliner. This was a rare option, with possibly only 27 examples so equipped.

1,007 examples of the BB 512i were produced between 1981 and 1984.

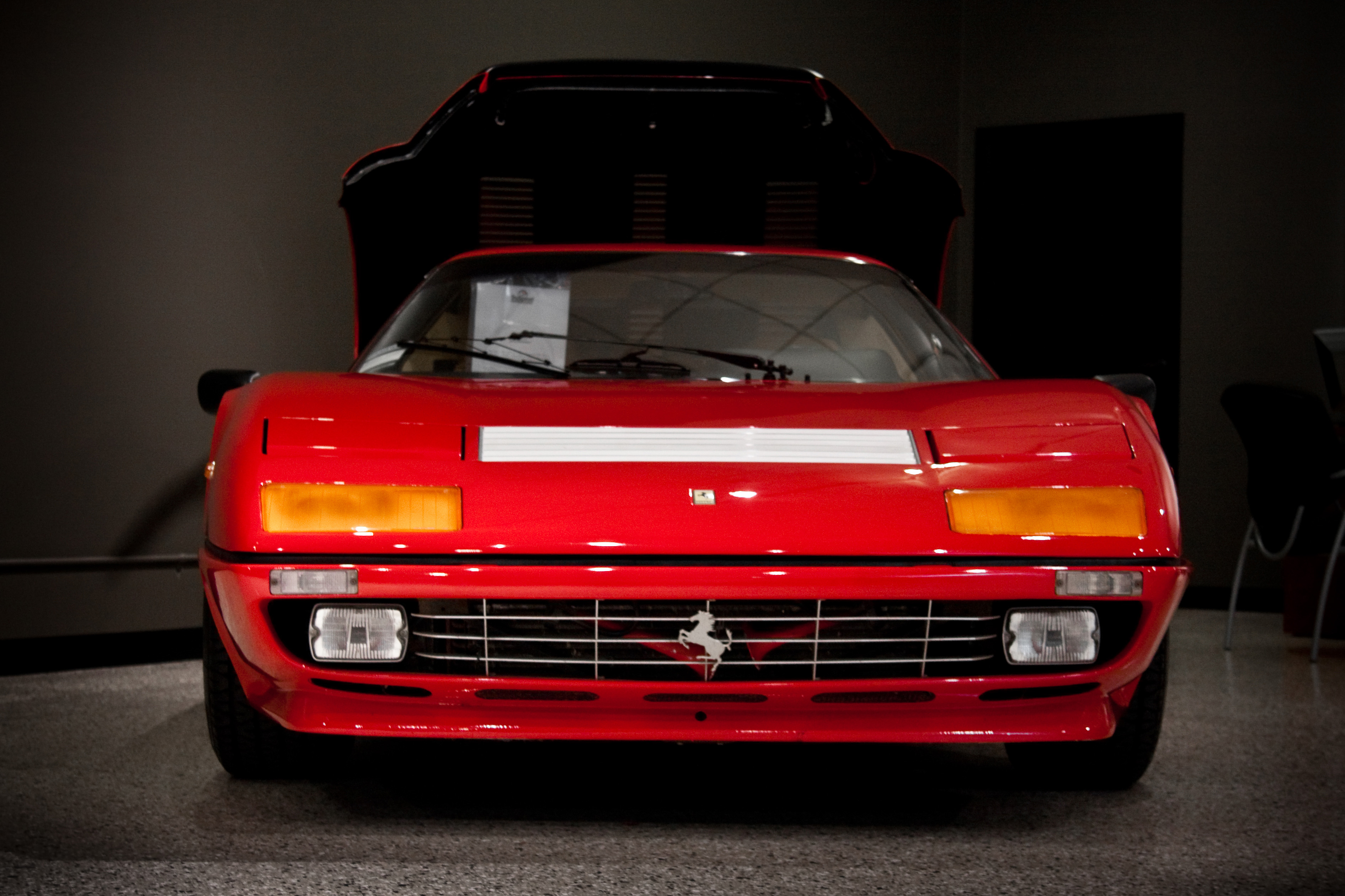
Front view of BB 512i showing revised grille and new marker lights in bumper.

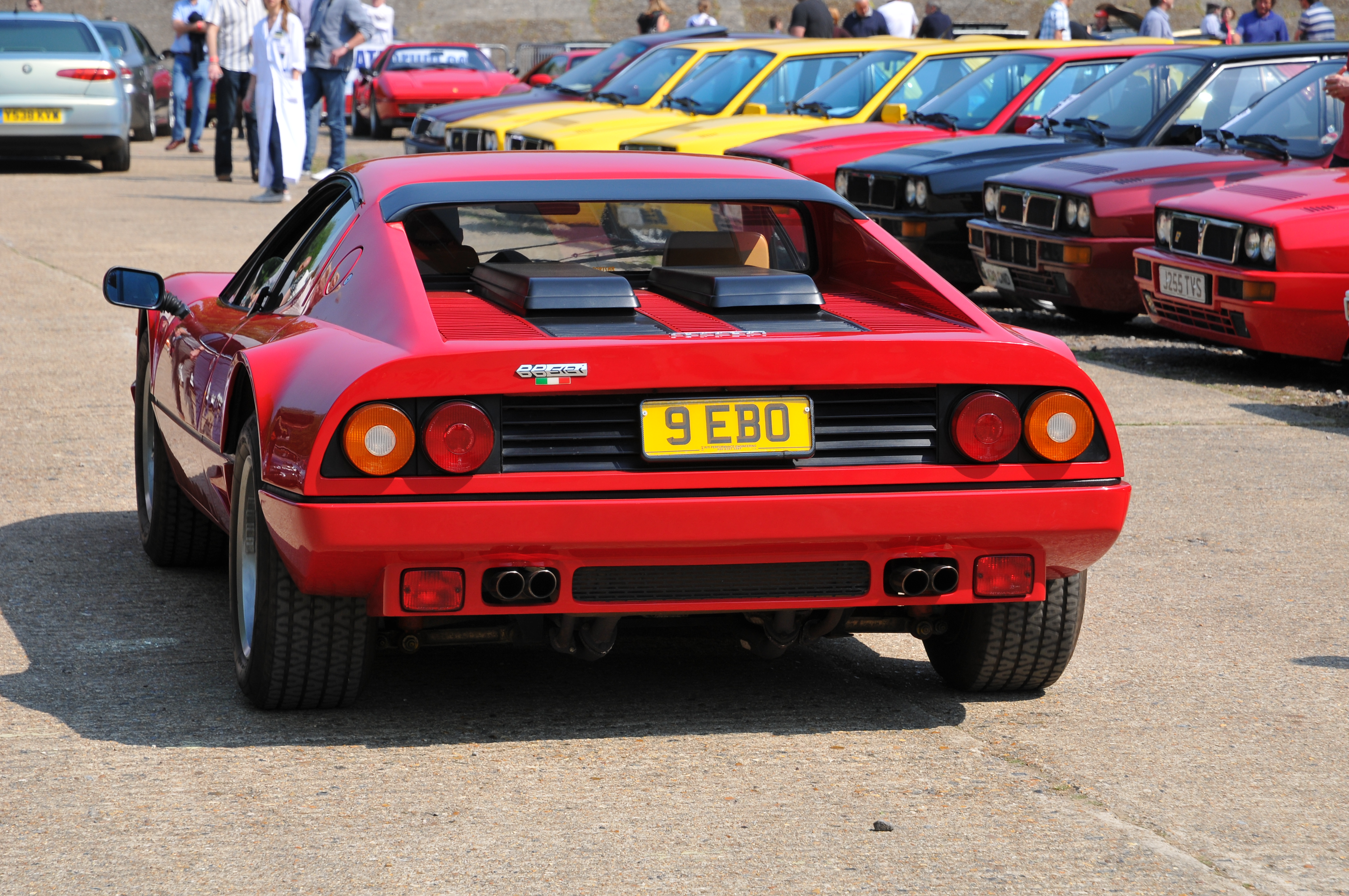
Rear view of BB 512i showing revised rear valence with fog lights.

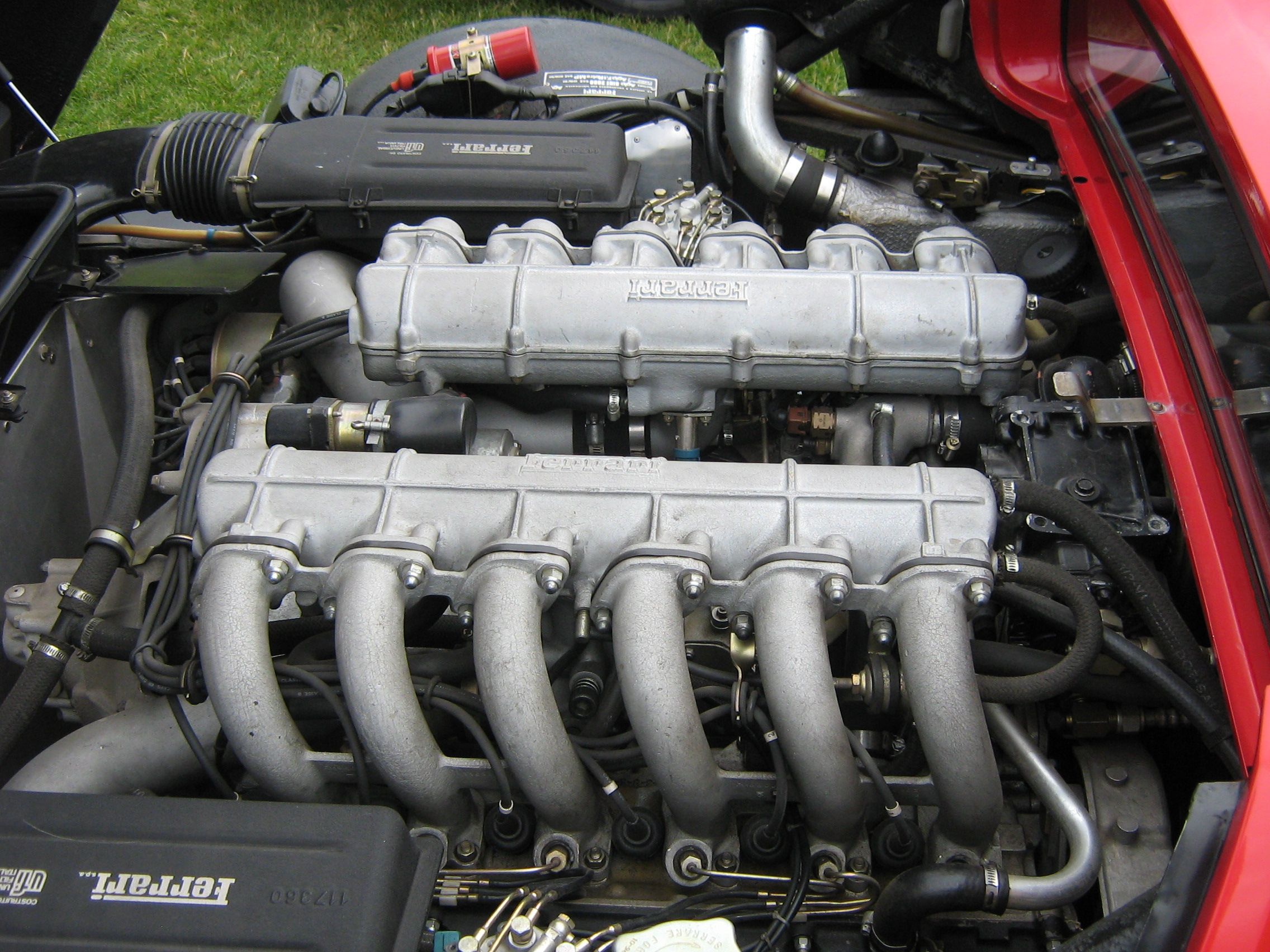
F110 A engine in BB 512i. Bosch K-Jetronic fuel distributors and injection lines are partially visible at top and bottom.

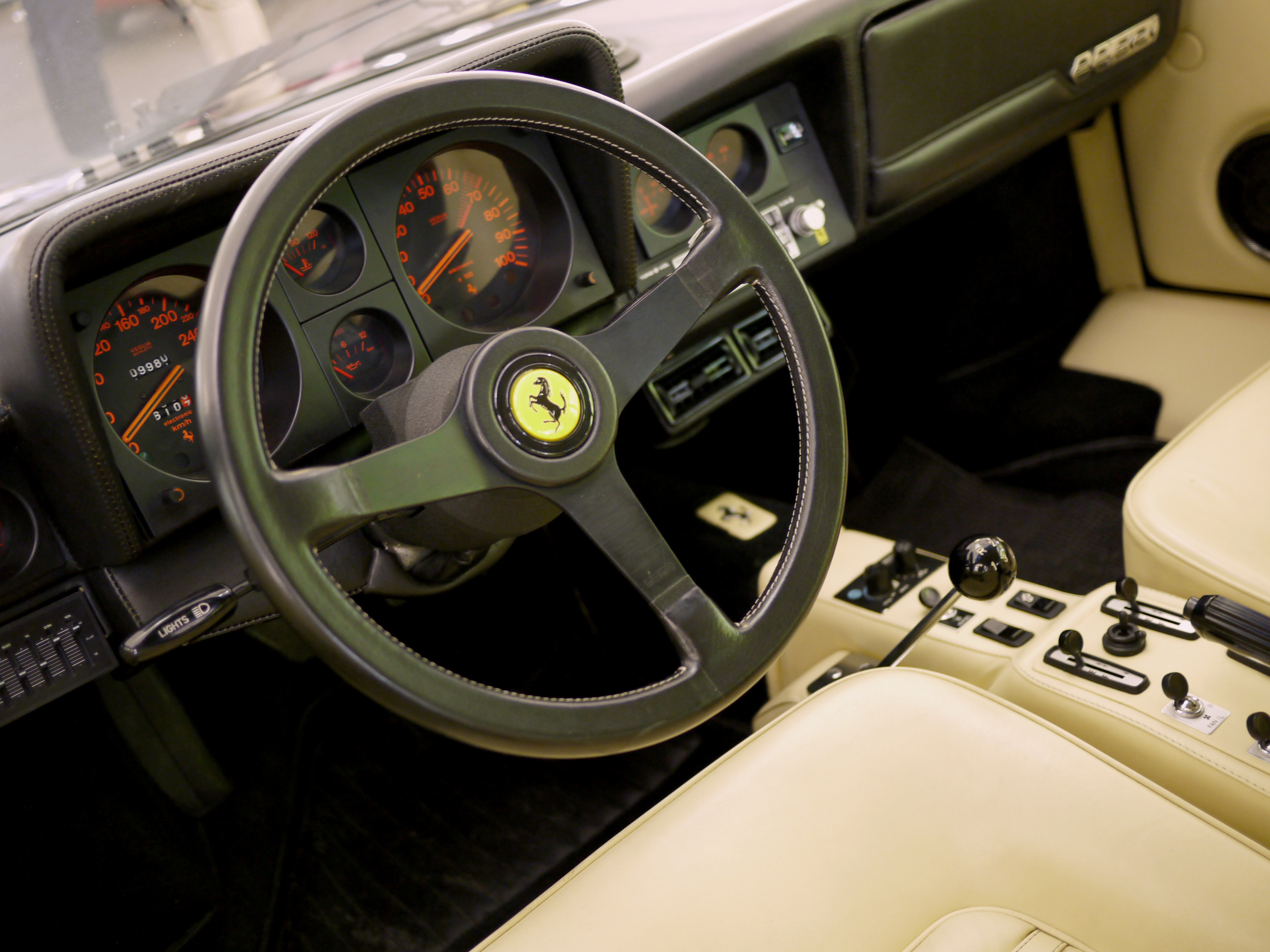
BB 512i interior

=== Berlinetta Boxer in North America ===
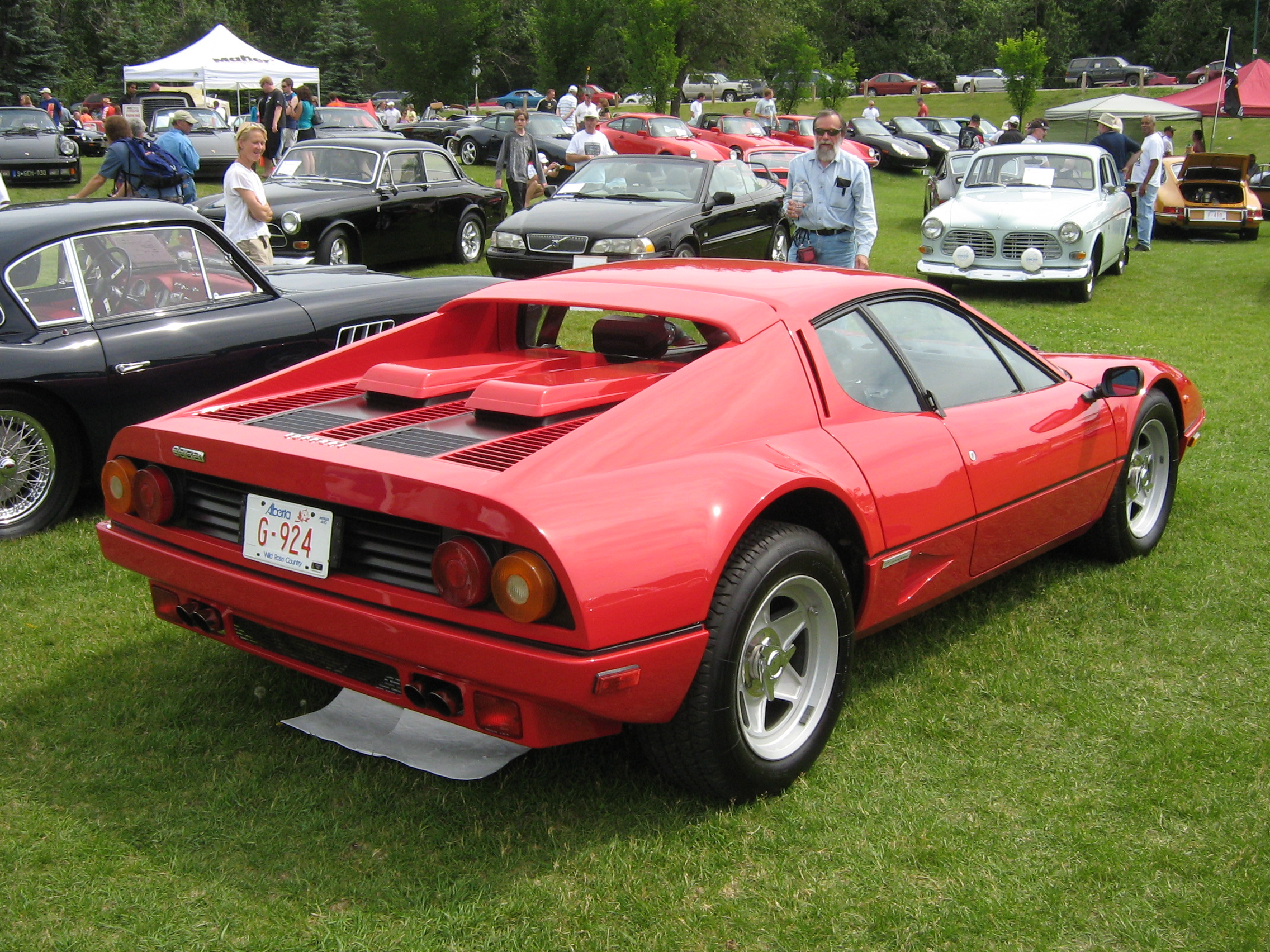
1983 "grey market" BB 512i. Note the additional regulatory side marker lights.

Neither the BB, nor its closest competitor, Lamborghini Countach, were built from the factory to meet United States or Canadian safety and emissions regulations. Enzo Ferrari believed that emerging environmental and safety regulations and the 55 MPH national speed limit suggested the company's eight-cylinder cars would suffice in the Malaise era U.S. market. The 365 GT4 BB was also initially planned for a very limited production run, which Ferrari believed could be easily sold in Europe alone.

Americans purchased the Berlinetta Boxer anyway, and both individual consumers and even authorized Ferrari dealers paid to modify each vehicle to meet United States Environmental Protection Agency and United States Department of Transportation regulations. This was known as the grey market era (1976-1988). While the BB, Lamborghini Countach, and Range Rover were among the first such vehicles, the infrastructure they created allowed the "grey market" to reach 66,900 vehicles in 1985.

The first 365/512 BBs to legally arrive in the US were modified by Richard "Dick" Fritz and his company, Amerispec. Fritz entered into an agreement with Ferrari dealer Chinetti Motors, his former employer, to modify and legalize a BB imported by the dealer. At that time there was no set process for determining whether an imported car met US government regulations. In order to resolve this issue, Fritz met with EPA and DOT officials to write a set of rules and tests to determine whether any specific imported car met legal requirements. Once these discussions yielded a set of enforceable requirements, Fritz began modifying BBs to meet them. This modification process, commonly known as "federalization", involved changes to the engine, instrumentation, lighting, seatbelts, and crash reinforcements. Amerispec's federalization process involved over 75 different changes. The front bumper and subframe had to be extensively modified in order to meet the "5 mph" zero damage standard in effect at the time. Carbureted models were modified with a secondary air injection system, catalytic converters, and various tuning adjustments in order to meet US emissions standards. The fuel injected BB 512i required fewer emissions-related modifications. The average cost to federalize a new BB was US$14,000.

After Amerispec proved the federalization process was legal and practical, other companies began offering federalization services. There was no standardized process for federalization and companies differed in their approach. As a result, many BBs entered the US in varying states of modification and compliance. Due to short staffing at the EPA and DOT, not all cars were rigorously inspected. In 1990, new laws came into effect that forbid importation of all cars which had no comparable USA-spec model, unless the car is more than 25 years old. This ended the practice of federalization and outlawed further importation of BB models until they reached the 25 year old cutoff. While all BB models can currently be imported into the US without modification, some cars still retain federalization modifications from the "grey market" era. Removing these modifications can involve significant practical and bureaucratic difficulties for owners and restorers.

== Specifications and performance ==
Measurements are notoriously variable, inaccurate, and definitionally vague even from Ferrari-issued sources of the same period. For example, the workshop manual documents maximum speed (typically speed at redline), whereas the owner's manual documents attainable speed, which appears to be speed at maximum HP per RPM not exceeding redline; for the 512 and 512i, this is likely not the maximum speed. Also, the workshop manual does not consistently distinguish measurements between the carbureted (512) and injected (512i) engines except with respect to the fuel delivery system, even though it is common knowledge that differences exist.

Owner's Manuals	365 GT4 BB	BB 512	BB 512i
Power	344 PS (253 kW; 339 hp) at 7200 rpm	340 PS (250 kW; 335 hp) at 6200 rpm	340 PS (250 kW; 335 hp) at 6000 rpm
Torque	41.7 kg⋅m (302 lb⋅ft; 409 N⋅m) at 3900 rpm	46 kg⋅m (333 lb⋅ft; 451 N⋅m) at 4600 rpm	46 kg⋅m (333 lb⋅ft; 451 N⋅m) at 4200 rpm
Redline	7000 rpm	6800 rpm	6600 rpm
Attainable speed	302 km/h (188 mph) @ 7000 rpm	272 km/h (169 mph) @ 6200 rpm	257 km/h (160 mph) @ 6000 rpm
0–100 km/h (0-62 mph)	5.4 secs	n/a	n/a
Dry weight	1,235 kg (2,723 lb)	1,596 kg (3,519 lb)	n/a
Kerb weight	n/a	n/a	1,580 kg (3,483 lb)

Workshop Manual	365 GT4 BB	BB 512 & BB 512i
Power	344 hp (253 kW) at 7200 rpm	360 hp (265 kW) at 6200 rpm
Torque	41.7 kg⋅m (409 N⋅m; 302 lb⋅ft) at 3900 rpm	46 kg⋅m (451 N⋅m; 333 lb⋅ft) at 4600 rpm
Redline	7000 rpm	6600 rpm
Maximum speed	302 km/h (188 mph)	288 km/h (179 mph)
0–100 km/h (0-62 mph)	5.4 secs	5.4 secs
Dry weight	1,235 kg (2,723 lb)	1,515 kg (3,340 lb)
Kerb weight	n/a	n/a

== Racing history ==
=== 365 GT4 BB ===
The 365 GT4 BB was never officially raced by Scuderia Ferrari, however Luigi Chinetti's North American Racing Team (NART) raced modified street cars with some factory support. In 1974, NART obtained two 365 GT4 BBs for use in sports car racing. These cars, chassis 18139 and 18095, began as standard road cars and were modified for competition use.

Chassis 18139 was totally disassembled by NART mechanics and received extensive modifications. These included removal of the factory interior, installation of a roll cage and larger fuel tank, improved suspension, wider bodywork with fixed headlights and wider wheels. Carburetor tuning was slightly adjusted and a new exhaust system was installed, but the engine was otherwise unmodified. 18139 was entered in the 1975 24 Hours of Daytona, but retired before the race after breaking a hub carrier during practice. 18139 finished 6th overall at the 12 Hours of Sebring two months later, then was entered at Road Atlanta where broke another hub carrier during practice and Lime Rock, where it retired from the race due to a broken connecting rod. The car was inactive during the 1976 season, then was entered in the 1977 24 Hours of Le Mans by NART. The car finished 16th overall and 5th in the IMSA class, driven by Francois Migault and Lucien Guitteny. For the 1978 season, 18139 was fitted with a 512 engine supplied by the factory. It placed 22nd overall at the 1978 24 hours of Daytona (again driven by Migault and Guitteny), 21st at Road Atlanta, 16th overall and 3rd in class at Le Mans and 11th at the 6 Hours of Watkins Glen. 18139's final competition appearance was in 1984 at the 6 Hours of Riverside. Although the car had been upgraded, it was no longer competitive and retired after 76 laps.

Chassis 18095 was also modified by NART, but not as radically as 18139. Wider wheels were used, measuring 8 in wide front and 11 in wide rear. The wheel arches were flared, a small rear spoiler and racing fuel filler were installed and the interior adapted with safety equipment including a roll bar, harness and fire extinguisher. The engine was standard except for a spacer to increase oil capacity and a new exhaust system. This car was entered in the 1975 24 Hours of Le Mans, but did not compete as NART withdrew from the race in protest over how the race organizers chose to classify their 308 GT4.

=== 512 BB LM ===
In 1978, Ferrari began producing a purpose-built competition version of the BB 512, termed the 512 BB LM (also styled 512 BB/LM or 512 BBLM). They were produced in two series, with the first series constructed in 1978 and the second series constructed between late 1978 and 1982.

Ferrari constructed three examples of the series one 512 BB LM in 1978. These had wider wheel arches, a roof-mounted aerofoil, and a rear wing adapted from the front wing of a Ferrari 312T2. Two of these cars were fitted with "long nose" bodywork, which extended the front of the car by several inches and replaced the standard full-width grille with a small oval air inlet. Power from the flat-12 was increased to approximately 400-440 bhp, while the cars' weight was decreased to approximately 1,200 kg (2,646 lb).

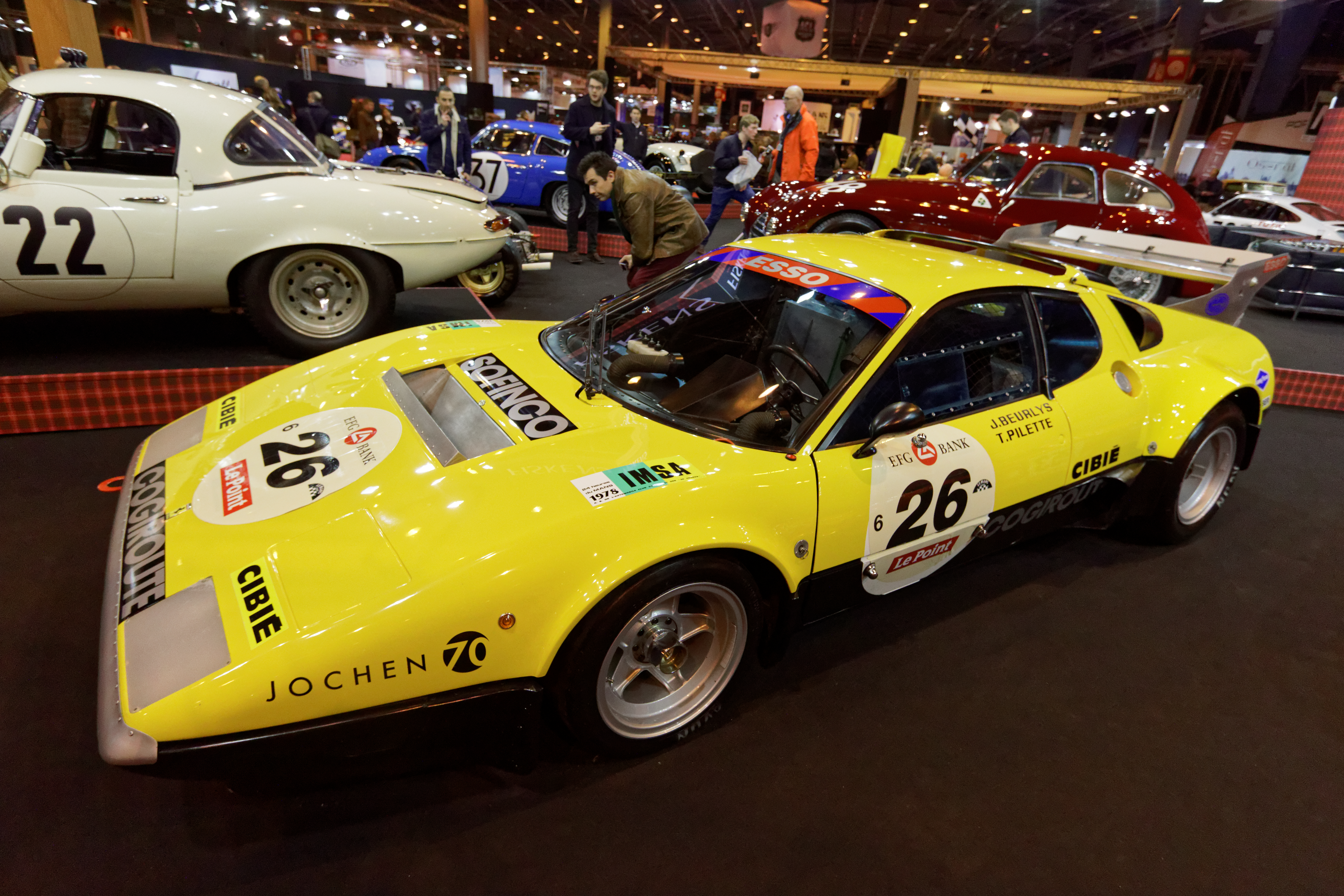
512 BB converted to competition spec in 1978 by Ecurie Francorchamps

The three factory S1 BB LMs competed in the 1978 24 Hours of Le Mans, with two cars entered by Ferrari importer Charles Pozzi and one car entered by NART. Jacques Swaters' Ecurie Francorchamps entered one additional 512 BB, which was converted to competition specification by the team. This car differed from the factory BB LM cars, weighing approximately 100 kg (220 lb) more. None of these cars finished the race due to mechanical issues.

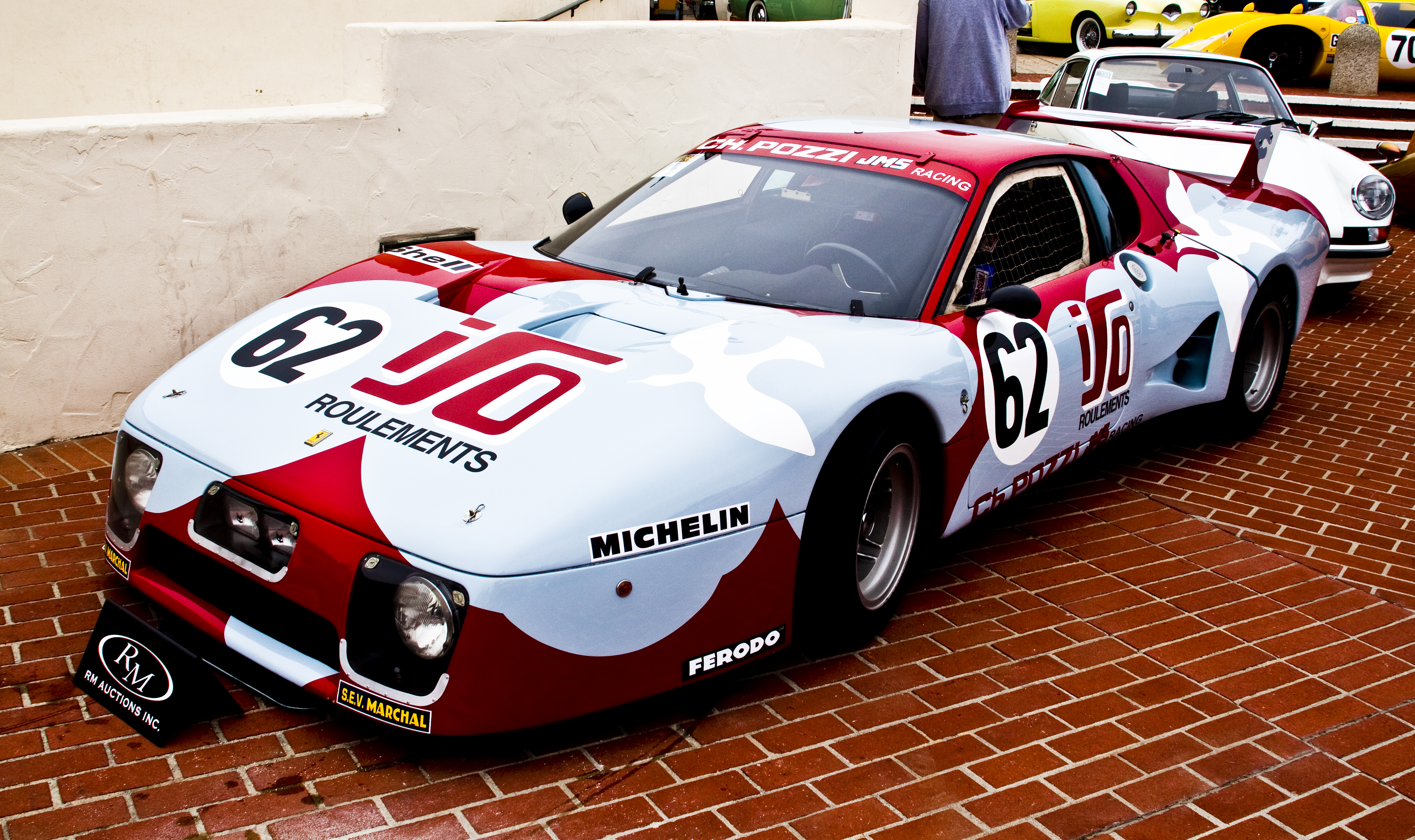
1979 512 BB LM, series 2 with racing bodywork by Pininfarina

After the failure of the first series, Ferrari worked on fixing the BB LM with a second development program in late 1978. The flat-12's carburetors were replaced with a Lucas mechanical fuel injection system to increase power to approximately 470-480 bhp. The transmission and cooling system were improved to handle the additional power. The production-based bodywork of the first BB LMs was replaced by a new design developed by Pininfarina which carried over very little of the original styling. The bodywork was now 16 in (41 cm) longer and 6 in (15 cm) wider, increasing overall weight compared to the S1 by 30 kg (66 lb). The pop-up headlights were now replaced by fixed units integrated into the fascia, while the tail was lengthened to the maximum allowed by regulations. Wider wheels were equipped, measuring 10in wide at the front and 13 in wide at the rear. Brakes and suspension were also improved. Nine of these S2 BB LMs were built by Ferrari in 1979.

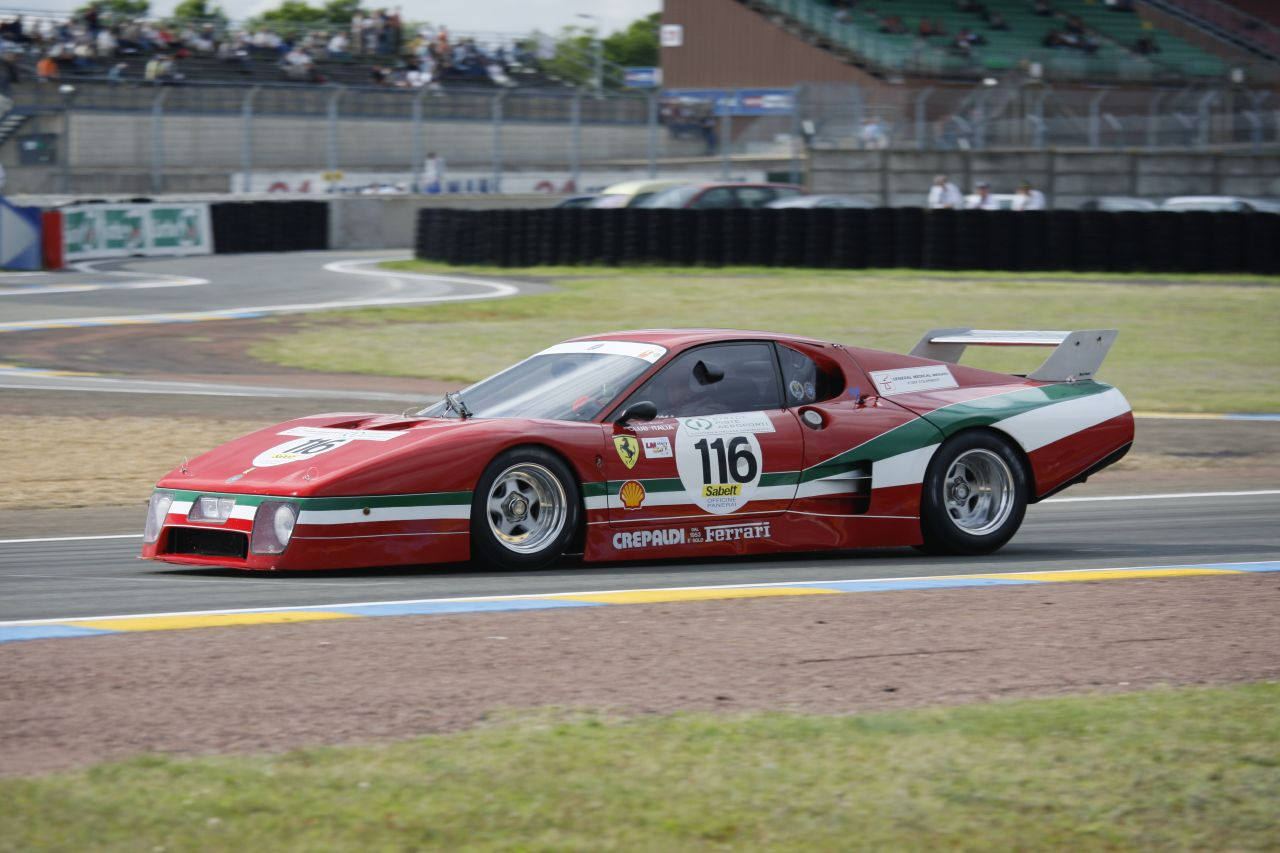
1981 512 BB LM, with updated S2 bodywork including "ground effect" side skirts

The S2 design was further improved in 1980, including vertical side skirts to take advantage of ground effect, a larger air inlet duct in front of the rear wheels and a lighter chassis with fiberglass body panels, reducing weight by 100 kg (220 lb). Some sources refer to these as series 3 cars. Sixteen updated S2 BB LMs were built from 1980 to 1982, bringing the total number of S2 512 BB LMs manufactured to 25.

The 512 BB LM was never raced by Scuderia Ferrari, but was instead campaigned by several independent teams with varying levels of factory support. Teams that used the BB LM in competition include NART, Pozzi, Ecurie Francorchamps, Bellancauto and others. The BB LM was campaigned in World Endurance Championship and IMSA races as well as smaller local events from its introduction in 1978 through 1985. Both S1 and S2 BB LMs had reliability issues that limited their competition success. This was exacerbated by the lack of a factory racing effort, as the BB LM was only raced by private teams with limited budgets and inconsistent factory support. Among the BB LM's best finishes was a fifth overall and first in the GTX class at the 1981 24 Hours of Le Mans, 6th overall at the 1982 24 hours of Le Mans and 10th overall at the 1980 24 hours of Le Mans. Since their retirement from top-level competition, BB LMs have competed at various vintage racing events worldwide.

== BB abbreviation ==
The letters "BB" are used as an initialisation for "Berlinetta Boxer" in official Ferrari sales materials, owners manuals and independent press coverage of the 365 GT4 BB, BB 512 and BB 512i. However, two accounts from Ferrari insiders might suggest that "Berlinetta Boxer" is a backronym and the letters "BB" originally had a different meaning.

According to engineer Mauro Forghieri, the letter "B" should signify "Bialbero", not "Boxer", since they knew the car was not equipped with a boxer engine due to the BB engine's crankshaft design. After the moniker "Berlinetta Boxer" was first presented at the 1971 Turin Motor Show, journalists kept using that name in spite of Forghieri's attempts to correct it.

An alternative origin story was put forward by Leonardo Fioravanti: He claimed that the "BB" designation was derived from a nickname given to the car by designer Fioravanti, Angelo Bellei and Sergio Scaglietti. During development of the 365 GT4 BB, they began to refer to the car as "Brigitte Bardot", as they perceived the prototype to be exceptionally beautiful like the French actress. This nickname was shortened to "BB" and quickly adopted by other Ferrari factory workers. "Berlinetta Boxer" was later invented by Ferrari officials prior to the model's introduction at the 1971 Turin Auto Show, as it was deemed unseemly to name a Ferrari after the actress.
