= Connew =

British racing car constructor

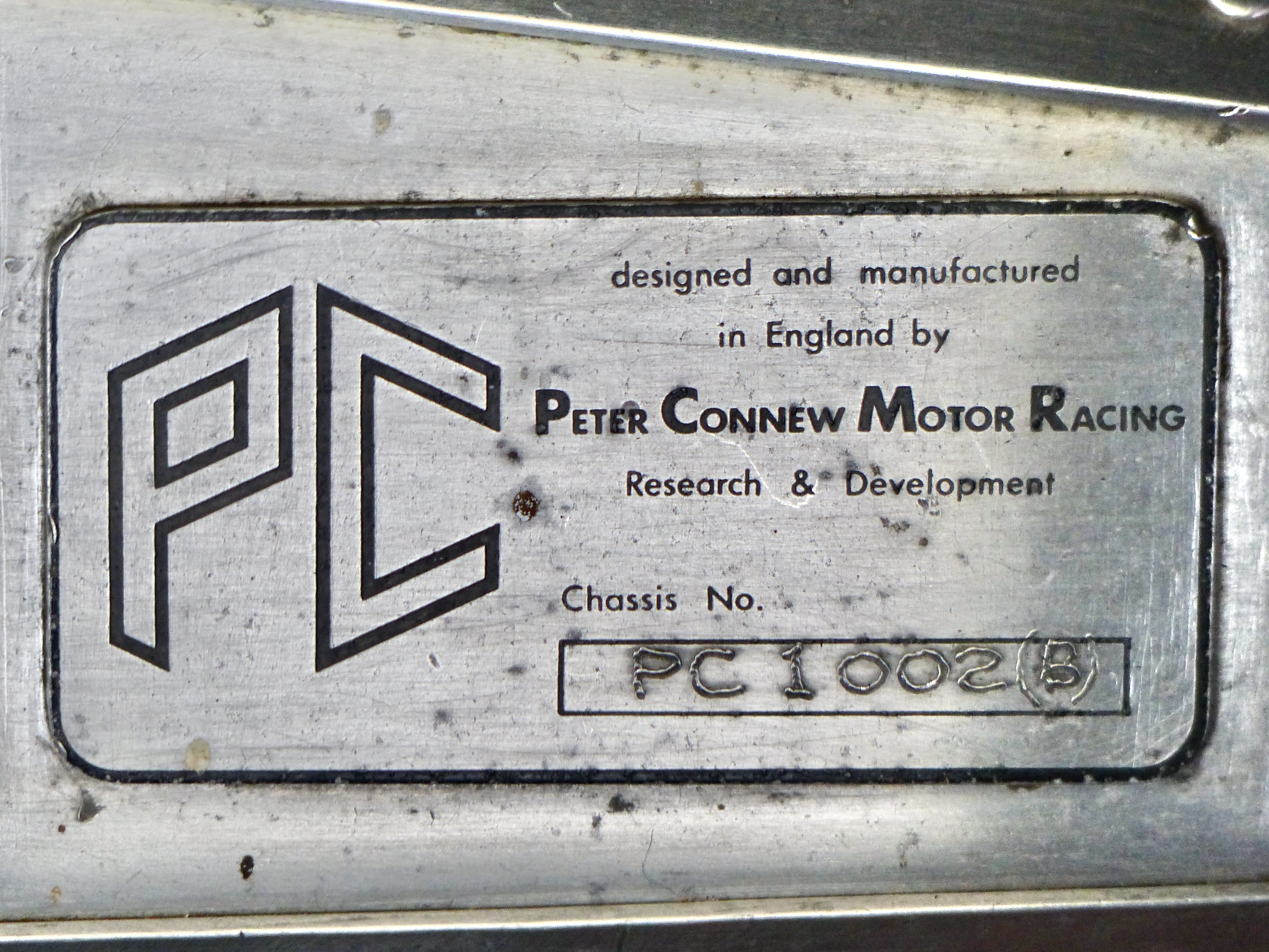
- Full name: Connew Racing Team
- Base: Chadwell Heath, UK
- Founder(s): Peter Connew
- Noted staff: Roger Doran; Barry Boor
- Noted drivers: (France) François Migault (United Kingdom) David Purley

Formula One World Championship career
- First entry: 1972 British Grand Prix
- Races entered: 2 (1 start)
- Engines: Cosworth DFV
- Race victories: 0
- Pole positions: 0
- Fastest laps: 0
- Final entry: 1972 Austrian Grand Prix

Connew Racing Team, commonly known as Connew (/ˈkɒn.juː/), was a short lived British Formula One constructor. Founded in 1971 by Peter Connew, the team constructed a single car, the PC1. The first monococque had to be aborted due to a change in regulations and the second tub was known as PC2. However, record books show the car driven by Migault and others as PC1. The intent was to compete in the Formula One World Championship in 1972, but a lack of financial and technical resources meant that the car only managed to start in one championship race, the 1972 Austrian Grand Prix, with French driver François Migault at the wheel. Following the Austrian race, the car competed in a handful of non-championship races before being converted to meet Formula 5000 specifications for the 1973 season. The chassis was damaged beyond repair during the season finale at Brands Hatch and the team closed.

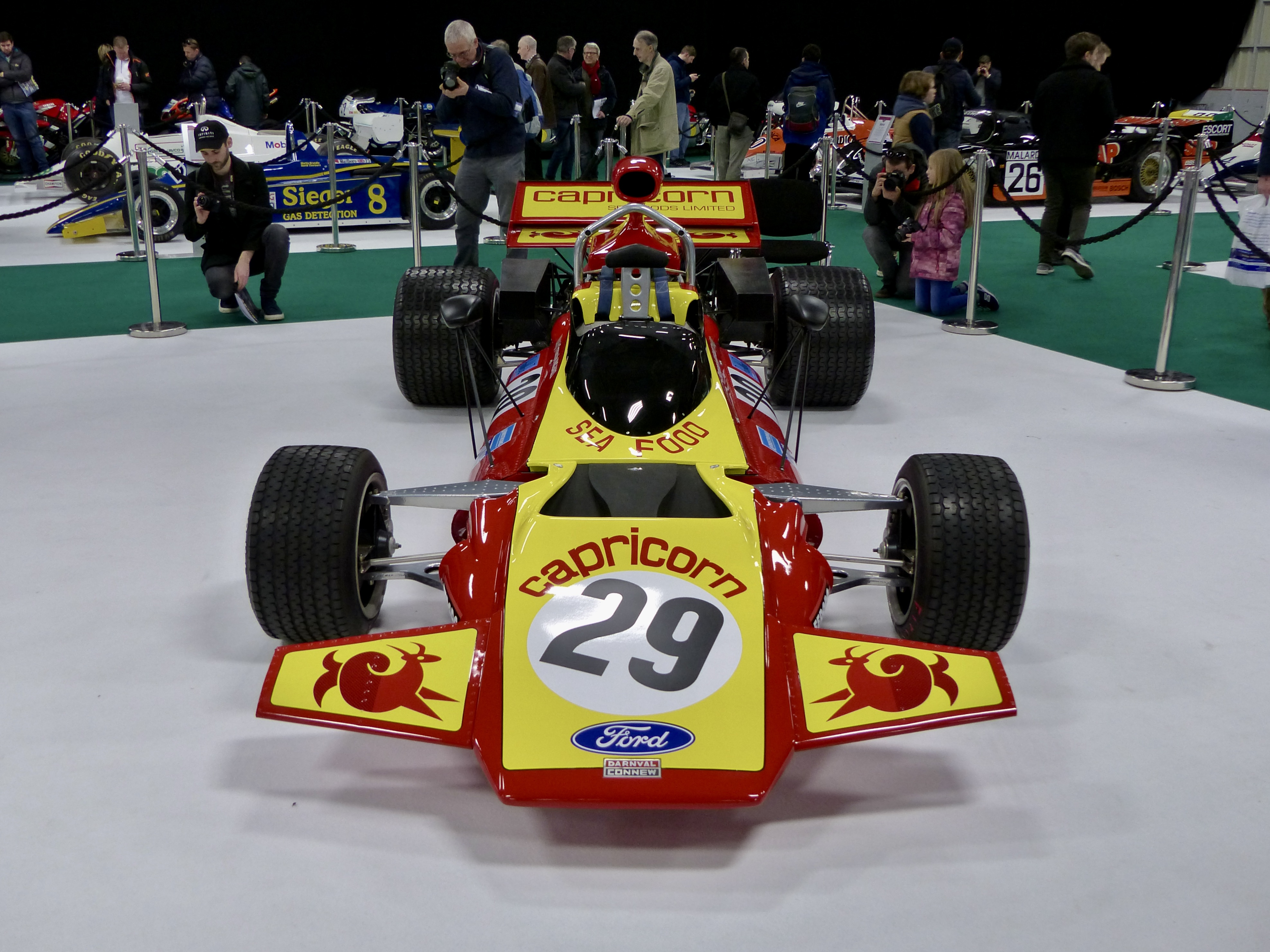
Connew PC1-Cosworth, at Race Retro, Stoneleigh, Warwickshire, 2018

== History ==
In 1969, at the age of 23, Peter Connew was asked by a friend if he wanted to attend the Italian Grand Prix at Monza. Connew's employer refused to give him time off to attend the race, so he resigned and travelled to the race anyway. Upon returning Connew needed employment and was hired by Surtees, a Formula One team run by former champion John Surtees, as a draughtsman.

=== 1972: Formula One ===
His car proves you can build a Formula One car by sweat alone, and makes you wonder about some of the astronomic development costs you hear the Establishment quoting!"

— Stuart Turner, Competition Manager for Ford.

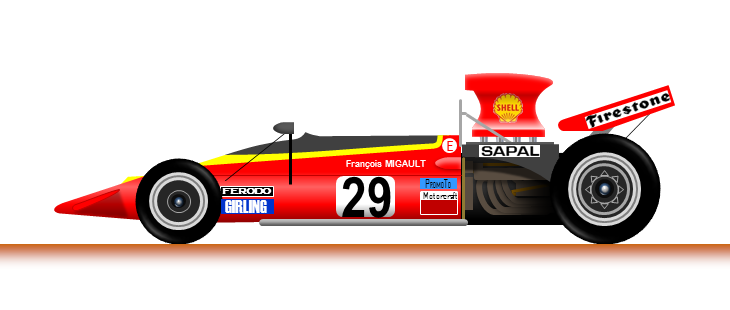
Connew PC1

After a falling out with team principal John Surtees, Connew left the team to pursue designing his own car. A garage was rented in Chadwell Heath and the initial construction of the chassis jig began in December 1970. Connew was assisted by Roger Doran, who worked as a shopfitter, and Connew's cousin Barry Boor.

Connew's design philosophy was that whilst the car should be efficient, it should also be easy to work on and maintain. The Connew design was tested and refined by utilising a wind tunnel of a local technical college. During the build, drivers Tony Trimmer, Howden Ganley and Gerry Birrell all came to view the car, with Trimmer stating it to be one of the most comfortable cars he had ever sat in.

The team planned to make their racing debut at the Monaco Grand Prix, but a sudden rule change required the construction of another chassis in a different type of aluminium. In the meantime, Connew made a deal with McLaren to purchase a second hand Cosworth DFV engine. Frenchman François Migault signed a deal to drive for the team and also provided a Ford truck, which carried the car to France. The truck broke down before it could get to the Clermont-Ferrand circuit, the location of the French Grand Prix and instead the team tested at the Bugatti Circuit in Le Mans.

The car finally took part in practice for the 1972 British Grand Prix but was withdrawn before the race. The car had an unusual rear suspension which proved not to be up to the job. It was taken back to the workshop and repaired overnight, but upon loading the next day, a rear upright was found to be cracked and it was withdrawn.

The small team also managed to show up at the 1972 German Grand Prix, but without having made a proper prior entry, participation was denied by the race officials.

The car was modified and entered in the 1972 Austrian Grand Prix. Migault qualified at the end of the field despite some engine troubles. After 22 laps, Migault had passed four competitors, but a rear wishbone mounting point failed and Migault had a nasty moment. The car swerved towards the barriers on the start/finish straight, but the driver brought the car safely to a halt without damage.

The Connew reappeared at the end of season World Championship Victory Race at Brands Hatch with David Purley driving but did not start because of electrical problems. Purley had asked for an electrical "kill" switch to be fitted to the steering wheel, but on the warm-up lap this malfunctioned, the engine stopped and the car was retired.

=== 1973: Formula 5000 ===
The car was modified to meet Formula 5000 regulations and appeared in the European Formula 5000 Championship in 1973, fitted with a Chevrolet V8 engine. The car made its first outing in the series at Mallory Park for round 10 of 18. Swiss driver Pierre Soukry qualified the car in twenty-first place, but was unable to start due to a split oil pipe. Three races later, the Connew failed to qualify at Brands Hatch, with Soukry at the wheel. The car's final appearance was at the season finale, again at Brands Hatch. Tony Trimmer drove but a collision with a barrier put the chassis beyond repair.

== Racing record ==
=== Formula One ===
==== Formula One World Championship ====
(key)

Year	Chassis	Engine(s)	Tyres	Drivers	1	2	3	4	5	6	7	8	9	10	11	12	Points	WCC
1972	Connew PC1	Ford V8	F		ARG	RSA	ESP	MON	BEL	FRA	GBR	GER	AUT	ITA	CAN	USA	0	NC
1972	Connew PC1	Ford V8	F	(France) François Migault							DNS		Ret				0	NC

==== Non-championship results ====
Year	Event	Venue	Driver	Result	Category	Report
1972	Rothmans 50,000	Brands Hatch	(France) François Migault	DNQ	Formula Libre	Report
1972	John Player Challenge Trophy	Brands Hatch	(United Kingdom) David Purley	DNS	Formula One	Report

=== Formula 5000 ===
==== European Formula 5000 Championship ====
(key)

Year	Chassis	Engine(s)	Drivers	1	2	3	4	5	6	7	8	9	10	11	12	13	14	15	16	17	18
1973	Connew PC1	Chevrolet V8		BRA	MAL	SIL	SNE	BRA	OUL	MAL	MIS	ZAN	MAL	MON	SIL	BRA	OUL	JYL	ZAN	SNE	BRA
1973	Connew PC1	Chevrolet V8	(Switzerland) Pierre Soukry										DNS			DNQ					
1973	Connew PC1	Chevrolet V8	(United Kingdom) Tony Trimmer																		Ret
