= François Migault =

French racing driver (1944–2012)

- Migault in 1975
- Born: François Marie Edouard Migault; 4 December 1944; Le Mans, France
- Died: 29 January 2012 (aged 67); Parigné-l'Évêque, France

Formula One World Championship career
- Nationality: (France) French
- Active years: 1972, 1974–1975
- Team(s): Connew, BRM, Hill, Williams
- Entries: 16 (13 starts)
- Championships: 0
- Wins: 0
- Podiums: 0
- Career points: 0
- Pole positions: 0
- Fastest laps: 0
- First entry: 1972 British Grand Prix
- Last entry: 1975 French Grand Prix

François Marie Edouard Migault (4 December 1944 – 29 January 2012) was a racing driver from Le Mans, France. He participated in 16 Formula One World Championship Grands Prix, debuting on 13 August 1972, but scored no championship points.

== Career ==
A native of Le Mans, Migault also entered the 24 Hours of Le Mans race 25 times, between 1972 and 2002.

Migault's first attempt in Formula One in 1972 was with the small, underfunded Connew team that managed to start in only one race. In 1974, he drove almost a complete season with British Racing Motors after both BRM drivers of 1973, Niki Lauda and Clay Regazzoni, had moved to Ferrari.

In 1975, a few races with the ill-fated Embassy Hill team and Williams followed. In Formula Two that year, Migault achieved some success with an Osella FA2, scoring one point.

Migault continued to compete at Le Mans until he was in his mid-fifties and achieved a best finish of second in 1976, together with two other podium finishes.

Migault died on 29 January 2012 after a long battle with cancer.

== Racing record ==
=== 24 Hours of Le Mans results ===
Year	Team	Co-Drivers	Car	Class	Laps	Pos.	Class Pos.
1969	(United States) North American Racing Team	(France) Robert Mieusset (United States) Ricardo Rodriguez	Ferrari Dino 206 S	S 2.0	-	DNS	DNS
1972	(France) Charles Pozzi	(France) Daniel Rouveyran	Ferrari 365 GTB/4	GT; 5.0	22	DNF	DNF
1973	(United States) North American Racing Team	(United States) Luigi Chinetti, Jr.	Ferrari 365 GTB/4	GT; 5.0	299	13th	**3rd**
1974	(France) Équipe Gitanes	(France) Jean-Pierre Jabouille	Matra-Simca MS670C	S 3.0	324	**3rd**	**3rd**
1975	(France) Automobiles Ligier-Gitanes	(France) Henri Pescarolo	Ligier JS2-Ford Cosworth	S 3.0	146	DNF	DNF
1976	(United States) Grand Touring Cars Inc.	(France) Jean-Louis Lafosse	Mirage GR8-Ford Cosworth	S 3.0	338	**2nd**	**2nd**
1977	(United States) North American Racing Team	(France) Lucien Guitteny	Ferrari 365 GT4/BB	IMSA	268	16th	6th
1978	(France) Écurie Grand Competition Cars (United States) North American Racing Team	(France) Lucien Guitteny	Ferrari 365 GT4/BB	IMSA +2.5	262	16th	**3rd**
1979	(United Kingdom) Alain de Cadenet	(United Kingdom) Alain de Cadenet	De Cadenet-Lola LM-Ford Cosworth	S +2.0	10	DNF	DNF
1980	(United Kingdom) Alain de Cadenet	(United Kingdom) Alain de Cadenet	De Cadenet-Lola LM-Ford Cosworth	S +2.0	313	7th	**3rd**
1981	(France) Jean Rondeau	(United Kingdom) Gordon Spice	Rondeau M379-Ford Cosworth	GTP; 3.0	335	**3rd**	**2nd**
1982	(France) Jean Rondeau - R. Malardeau	(United Kingdom) Gordon Spice (France) Xavier Lapeyre	Rondeau M382-Ford Cosworth	C	150	DNF	DNF
1983	(United Kingdom) Peer Racing	(Republic of Ireland) David Kennedy (Republic of Ireland) Martin Birrane	Ford C100	C	16	DNF	DNF
1984	(United Kingdom) John Bartlett Racing	(United Kingdom) Steve Kempton (France) François Sérvanin	Lola T610-Ford Cosworth	C2	52	DNF	DNF
1986	(France) WM Secateva	(France) Jean-Daniel Raulet (France) Michel Pignard	WM P86-Peugeot	C1	132	DNF	DNF
1987	(France) WM Secateva	(France) Jean-Daniel Raulet (France) Pascal Pessiot	WM P86-Peugeot	C1	14	DNF	DNF
1988	(France) Courage Compétition	(France) Paul Belmondo (Japan) Ukyo Katayama	Cougar C22-Porsche	C1	66	DNF	DNF
1990	(France) Automobiles Louis Descartes	(France) Gérard Tremblay (France) Jacques Heuclin	ALD C289-Ford Cosworth	C2	36	DNF	DNF
1991	(France) Courage Compétition	(France) Lionel Robert (France) Jean-Daniel Raulet	Cougar C26S-Porsche	C2	331	11th	11th
1992	(United Kingdom) T.D.R. Limited	(United Kingdom) Chris Hodgetts (France) Thierry Lecerf	Spice SE90C-Ford Cosworth	C1	-	DNS	DNS
1993	(Germany) Porsche Kremer Racing	(United States) Andy Evans (Spain) Tomás Saldaña	Porsche 962CK6	C2	316	13th	8th
1994	(France) Rent-a-Car Racing Team	(France) Denis Morin (France) Philippe Gache	Dodge Viper RT/10	GT1	225	NC	NC
1995	(United Kingdom) Team Marcos	(United Kingdom) David Leslie (United Kingdom) Chris Marsh	Marcos Mantara LM600-Chevrolet	GT2	184	NC	NC
1997	(United Kingdom) Team Marcos	(United Kingdom) Dominic Chappell (Switzerland) Henri-Louis Maunoir	Marcos Mantara LM600-Chevrolet	GT2	-	DNQ	DNQ
1998	(France) Pilot Racing	(France) Michel Ferté (France) Pascal Fabre	Ferrari 333 SP	LMP1	203	DNF	DNF
2001	(United Kingdom) S R Rowan Racing Ltd.	(Republic of Ireland) Warren Carway (United Kingdom) Martin O'Connell	Pilbeam MP84-Nissan	LMP675	3	DNF	DNF
2002	(Japan) Kondo Racing	(Japan) Masahiko Kondo (United Kingdom) Ian McKellar, Jr.	Dome S101-Judd	LMP900	182	DNF	DNF

=== Complete World Sportscar Championship results ===
(key) (Races in bold indicate pole position) (Races in italics indicate fastest lap)

Year	Entrant	Class	Chassis	Engine	1	2	3	4	5	6	7	8	9	10	11	12	13	14	15	Pos.	Pts
1969	North American Racing Team	S 2.0	Ferrari Dino 206 S	Ferrari 2.0 V6	DAY	SEB	BRH	MNZ	TAR	SPA	NÜR	LMS; DNS	GLN	ÖST						(Note: No drivers' Championship.)	
1972	Brian Robinson	S 2.0	Chevron B21	Ford Cosworth FVC 1.8 L4	BUE	DAY	SEB	BRH; DSQ	MNZ	SPA; Ret	TAR	NÜR; Ret									
1972	Automobiles Charles Pozzi	GT 5.0	Ferrari 365 GTB/4	Ferrari 4.4 V12									LMS; Ret	ÖST	GLN						
1973	North American Racing Team	GT 5.0	Ferrari 365 GTB/4	Ferrari 4.4 V12	DAY; 2	VAL						LMS; 13	ÖST	GLN; 14							
1973	Rouveyran Racing	S 3.0	Lola T280	Ford Cosworth DFV 3.0 V8			DIJ; Ret	MNZ	SPA	TAR	NÜR										
1974	Automobiles Ligier	S 3.0	Ligier JS2	Maserati 3.0 V6	MNZ	SPA; Ret	NÜR	IMO; 13		ÖST; Ret	GLN	LEC; 6	BRH	KYA							
1974	Équipe Gitanes	S 3.0	Matra-Simca MS670C	Matra 3.0 V12					LMS; 3												
1975	Equipe Ligier Gitanes	S 3.0	Ligier JS2	Ford Cosworth DFV 3.0 V8	DAY	MUG; DNS	DIJ; 6	MNZ	SPA; 12	PER	NÜR	ÖST	GLN								
1976	Team Warsteiner RTS.	S 3.0	Lola T284	Ford Cosworth DFV 3.0 V8	NÜR	MNZ	IMO	PER	MOS	DIJ	SAL; Ret									(Note: In 1976 and 1977 the World Championship was divided into two series that ran simultaneously but separately: The World Sportscar Championship and the World Championship for Makes.)	
1976	Bourgogne	Gr.5	BMW 3.5 CSL	BMW 3.5 L6	MUG	VAL	SIL	NÜR	ÖST	GLN	DIJ; 16										
1978	Howard O'Flynn	IMSA +2.5	Ferrari 365 GT4/BB	Ferrari 4.4 F12	DAY; 19	MUG	DIJ	SIL	NÜR	MIS	GLN; 11	VAL									
1979	Alain de Cadenet	S +2.0	De Cadenet-Lola LM	Ford Cosworth DFV 3.0 V8	DAY	MUG	DIJ	SIL; 2	NÜR	PER	GLN	BRH; 6	VAL								
1980	Alain de Cadenet	S +2.0	De Cadenet-Lola LM	Ford Cosworth DFV 3.0 V8	DAY	BRH	MUG	MNZ	SIL	NÜR	LMS; 7	GLN	MOS	VAL	DIJ						
1981	Jean Rondeau	GTP 3.0	Rondeau M379	Ford Cosworth DFV 3.0 V8	DAY	SEB	MUG	MNZ	RSD	SIL	NÜR	LMS; 3	PER	DAY	GLN	SPA	MOS	ROA	BRH	123rd	19
1982	Jean Rondeau	C	Rondeau M482	Cosworth DFL 4.0 V8	MNZ	SIL; Ret	NÜR													55th	8
1982	Jean Rondeau	C	Rondeau M382	Cosworth DFL 4.0 V8				LMS; Ret	SPA; 5	MUG	FUJ	BRH								55th	8
1983	Peer Racing	C	Ford C100	Cosworth DFL 3.3 V8	MNZ	SIL	NÜR	LMS; Ret	SPA	FUJ	KYA									NC	0
1984	John Bartlett Racing	C2	Lola T610	Cosworth DFL 3.3 V8	MNZ	SIL	LMS; Ret	NÜR	BRH	MOS	SPA	IMO	FUJ	KYA	SAN					NC	0
1986	WM Secateva	C1	WM P86	Peugeot PRV ZNS4 2.6 V6t	MNZ	SIL	LMS; Ret	NOR	BRH	JER	NÜR	SPA	FUJ							NC	0
1987	WM Secateva	C1	WM P86	Peugeot PRV ZNS4 2.8 V6t	JAR	JER	MNZ	SIL	LMS; Ret	NOR	BRH	NÜR	SPA	FUJ						NC	0
1988	Courage Compétition	C1	Cougar C22	Porsche Type-935 2.8 F6t	JER	JAR	MNZ	SIL	LMS; Ret	BRN	BRH	NÜR	SPA	FUJ	SAN					NC	0
1990	Automobiles Louis Descartes	C	ALD C289	Cosworth DFL 3.3 V8	SUZ; Ret	MNZ; Ret		SPA; 25	DIJ; 26	NÜR; 21	DON; 20	CGV; Ret								NC	0
1990	Automobiles Louis Descartes	C	ALD C289	Ford Cosworth DFZ 3.5 V8			SIL; 20													NC	0
1990	Alba Formula	C	Alba AR20	Buick 4.5 V6									MEX; 16							NC	0
1991	Courage Compétition	C2	Cougar C26S	Porsche Type-935 3.2 F6t	SUZ	MNZ; 9	SIL; Ret		NÜR; 6	MAG; Ret	MEX; 10	AUT								36th	9
1991	Courage Compétition	C2	Cougar C26S	Porsche Type-935 3.0 F6t				LMS; 11												36th	9
1992	T.D.R. Limited	C1	Spice SE90C	Ford Cosworth DFZ 3.5 V8	MNZ	SIL	LMS; DNS	DON	SUZ	MAG										NC	0

Footnotes

=== Complete European Formula Two Championship results ===
(key)

Year	Entrant	Chassis	Engine	1	2	3	4	5	6	7	8	9	10	11	12	13	14	15	16	17	Pos.	Pts
1971	LIRA Team Lotus	Lotus 69	Ford	HOC	THR	NÜR	JAR	PAL	ROU; 5	MAN	TUL										11th	7
1971	March Engineering	March 712M	Ford									ALB; 4	VAL	VAL							11th	7
1973	Shell-Arnold Team	Pygmée MDB18	Ford	MAL	HOC; Ret	THR; Ret	NÜR	PAU; Ret	KIN	NIV	HOC	ROU; 11	MNZ; DNS	MAN	KAR	PER	SAL	NOR	ALB	VAL	NC	0
1976	Osella Squadra Corse	Osella FA2	BMW	HOC; Ret	THR; 6	VAL; DNQ	SAL; DNQ	PAU; Ret	HOC; 11	ROU	MUG	PER	EST	NOG	HOC						17th	1

=== Complete Formula One World Championship results ===
(key)

Year	Entrant	Chassis	Engine	1	2	3	4	5	6	7	8	9	10	11	12	13	14	15	WDC	Pts
1972	Darnvall Connew	Connew PC1	Ford Cosworth DFV 3.0 V8	ARG	RSA	ESP	MON	BEL	FRA	GBR; DNS	GER	AUT; Ret	ITA	CAN	USA				NC	0
1974	Team BRM	BRM P160E	BRM P142 3.0 V12	ARG; Ret	BRA; 16	RSA; 15	ESP; Ret	BEL; 16	MON; Ret	SWE		FRA; 14	GBR; NC	GER; DNQ	AUT				NC	0
1974	Team BRM	BRM P201	BRM P200 3.0 V12								NED; Ret					ITA; Ret	CAN	USA	NC	0
1975	Embassy Racing With Graham Hill	Hill GH1	Ford Cosworth DFV 3.0 V8	ARG	BRA	RSA	ESP; NC	MON	BEL; Ret	SWE	NED								NC	0
1975	Frank Williams Racing Cars	Williams FW03	Ford Cosworth DFV 3.0 V8									FRA; DNS	GBR	GER	AUT	ITA	USA		NC	0

=== Non-championship Formula One results ===
(key)

Year	Entrant	Chassis	Engine	1	2	3	4	5	6
1972	Ecurie Volant Shell	March 721G	Ford Cosworth DFV 3.0 V8	ROC	BRA	INT	OUL	REP	VIC; DNS
1974	Team BRM	BRM P160E	BRM P142 3.0 V12	PRE	ROC	INT; 5			
