= Chevron B20 =

The Chevron B20 is an open-wheel formula racing car, designed, developed and built by British manufacturer Chevron Cars, for Formula Two, Formula Atlantic, and Formula Three racing, in 1972. It was an evolution of the previous B18. It was powered by the 1.8 L (110 cu in) Ford-Cosworth FVA four-cylinder engine, making 235 hp (175 kW).
