= BMW M1 =

Sports car manufactured by BMW from 1978 to 1981

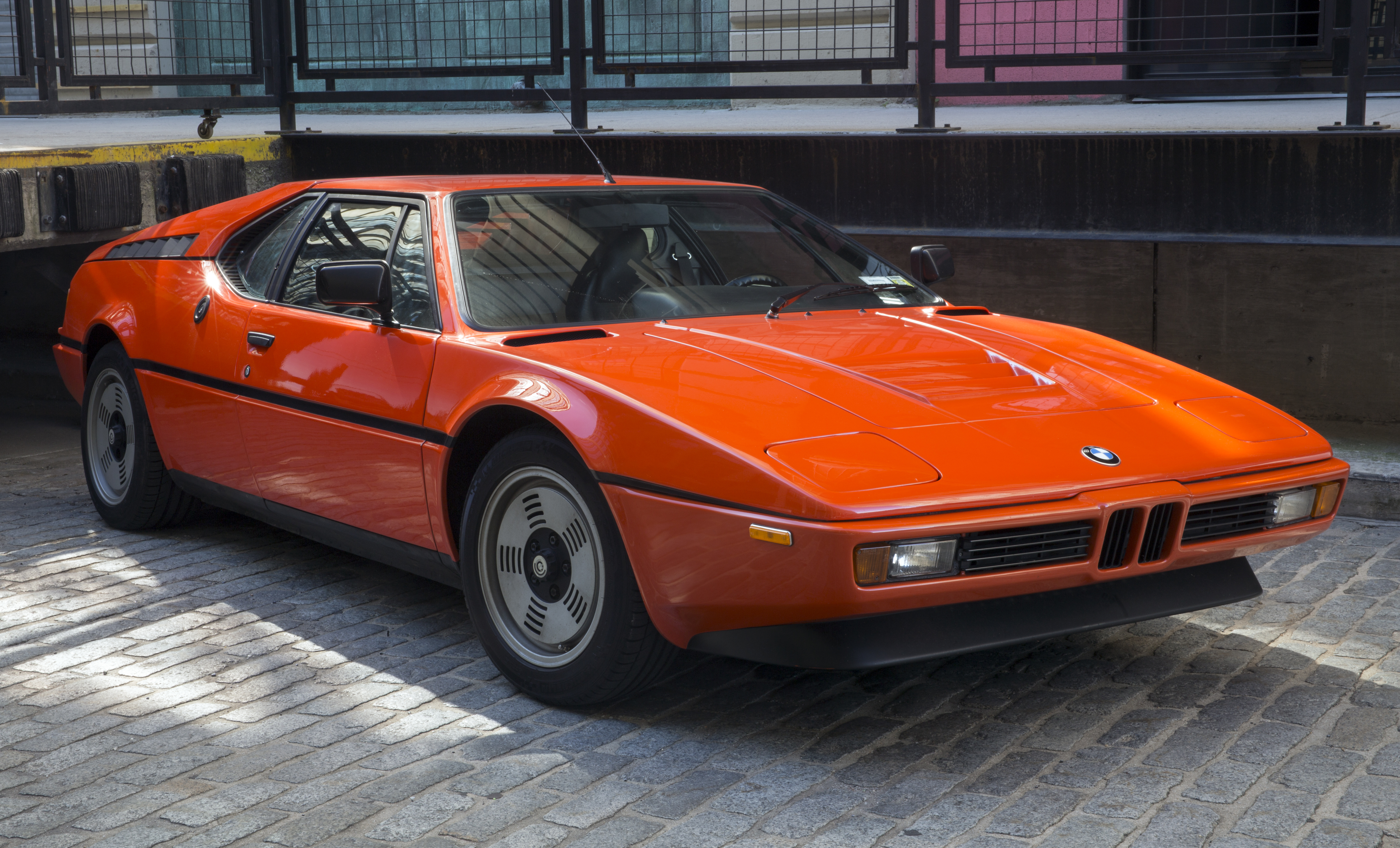

Overview
- Manufacturer: Karosserie Baur, BMW M GmbH
- Model code: E26
- Production: 1978–1981; 453 produced
- Assembly: Italy: Turin (initial assembly); Germany: Munich (final assembly and inspection)
- Designer: Giorgetto Giugiaro at Italdesign

Body and chassis
- Class: Sports car (S)
- Body style: 2-door coupé
- Layout: Mid-engine, rear-wheel-drive

Powertrain
- Engine: 3.5 L M88 I6
- Transmission: 5-speed manual

Dimensions
- Wheelbase: 2,600 mm (102.4 in)
- Length: 4,361 mm (171.7 in)
- Width: 1,824 mm (71.8 in)
- Height: 1,140 mm (44.9 in)
- Curb weight: 1,300 kg (2,866 lb)

Chronology
- Predecessor: BMW Turbo

The BMW M1 (model code E26) is a mid-engined sports car produced by German automotive manufacturer BMW from 1978 until 1981.

In the late 1970s, Italian automobile manufacturer Lamborghini entered into an agreement with BMW to build a production racing car in sufficient quantity for homologation, but conflicts arose that prompted BMW to produce the car themselves. The resulting car was sold to the public, from 1978 until 1981, as the BMW M1.

It was the first mid-engine BMW automobile to be mass-produced; the second was the i8 plug-in hybrid sports car.

== Overview ==
=== Development history ===
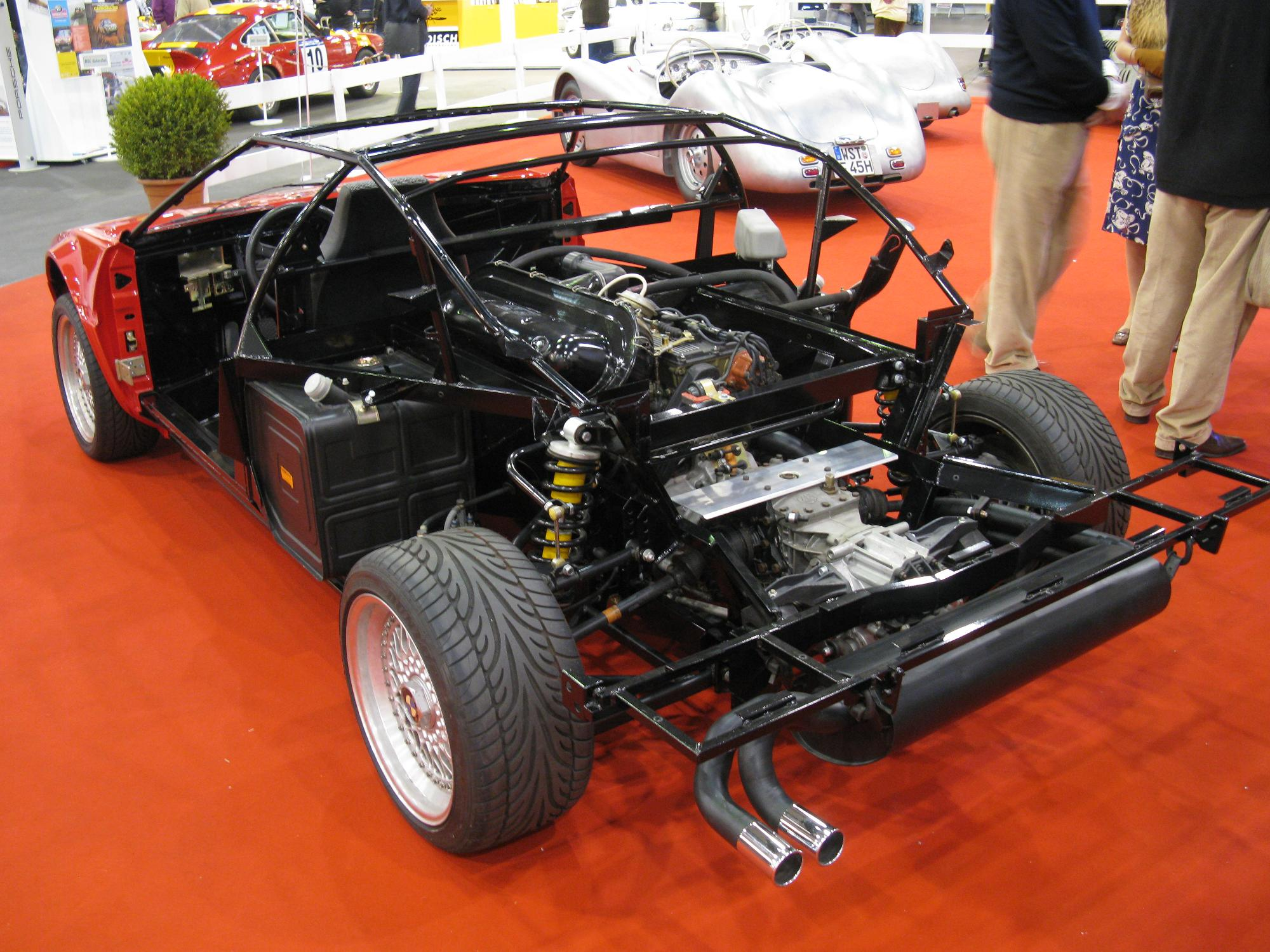
The M1 has a tubular steel space-frame chassis

The motorsport division of BMW, headed by Jochen Neerpasch, had been wanting to compete in motorsports using a car developed for competition racing, in order to compete with arch rival Porsche in Group-5 racing. Thus, the development of the M1 was initiated. Neerpasch, who was head of the development program, stressed that the car was to be strictly mid-engine in order to outclass its competitors. As BMW wasn't able to build 400 road-going examples of the car in the required time period as stipulated by the rules, the company partnered with Lamborghini to work out the details of the car's chassis, assemble prototypes and manufacture the vehicles. The tubular steel space frame chassis was the work of Gianpaolo Dallara, but soon Lamborghini's financial position deteriorated and the possibility of the car's production by the Italian manufacturer faded, so BMW reassumed control over the project in April 1978, after seven prototypes were built. The delay in production and the changes in Group 5 rules forced the company to compete in Group 4 racing with the car.

The M1 coupé was hand-built between 1978 and 1981 under the motorsport division of BMW, as a homologation special for sports car racing. The fibreglass body was designed by Giorgetto Giugiaro, taking inspiration from the 1972 BMW Turbo concept car. Since the engineering of the car was still incomplete, a group of former Lamborghini engineers had founded a company named Italengineering, which offered to complete the car's design. Less than 10 miles away from the Lamborghini shop, the engineering for the M1 was finished.

=== Engine and transmission ===
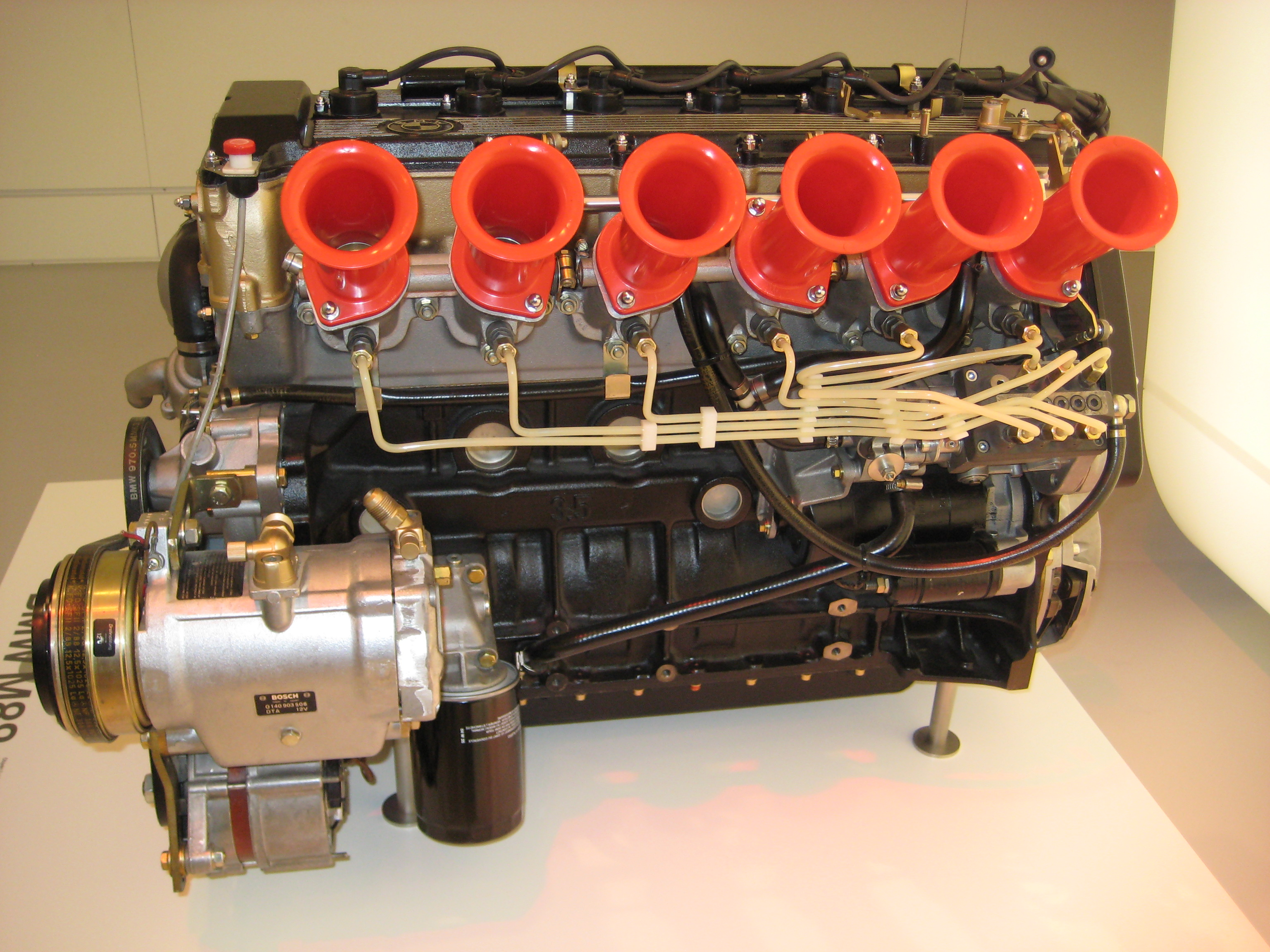
The 3.5-litre M88/1 inline-6 engine

The BMW M1 is the first car to be solely developed by BMW M and employs a 3,453 cc (3.5 L) M88/1 petrol straight-six engine with Kugelfischer-Bosch mechanical fuel injection and Magneti-Marelli ignition system. The engine was developed by Paul Rosche, who was also responsible for the S14 inline-four engine and the S70/2 V12 engine. A version of this engine was later used in the South African version of the 745i, of which 209 examples were built between 1984 and 1986, as well as the E24 M6/M635CSi and E28 M5. The engine has six separate throttle bodies, twin-cams, 4 valves per cylinder, and generates a power output of 277 PS (204 kW; 273 hp) at 6,500 rpm and 330 N⋅m (243 lbf⋅ft) of torque at 5,000 rpm in the road version, giving the car a top speed of 265 km/h (165 mph). The engine was mated to a 5-speed manual transmission made by ZF Friedrichshafen equipped with a 40% locking limited slip differential.

=== Steering, suspension and brakes ===
The M1 has unassisted rack-and-pinion steering, and a double-wishbone suspension system with adjustable coil springs and Bilstein gas filled dampers. The road car had softer suspension bushings for better ride quality and tractability.

The ventilated steel brakes of the car measured 300 mm (11.8 in) at the front and 297 mm (11.7 in) at the rear. The M1 used special Campagnolo alloy wheels measuring 7×16 inches at the front and 8×16 inches at the rear, fitted with Pirelli P7 tyres (205/55 VR15 at the front and 225/50 VR15 at the rear).

=== Interior ===
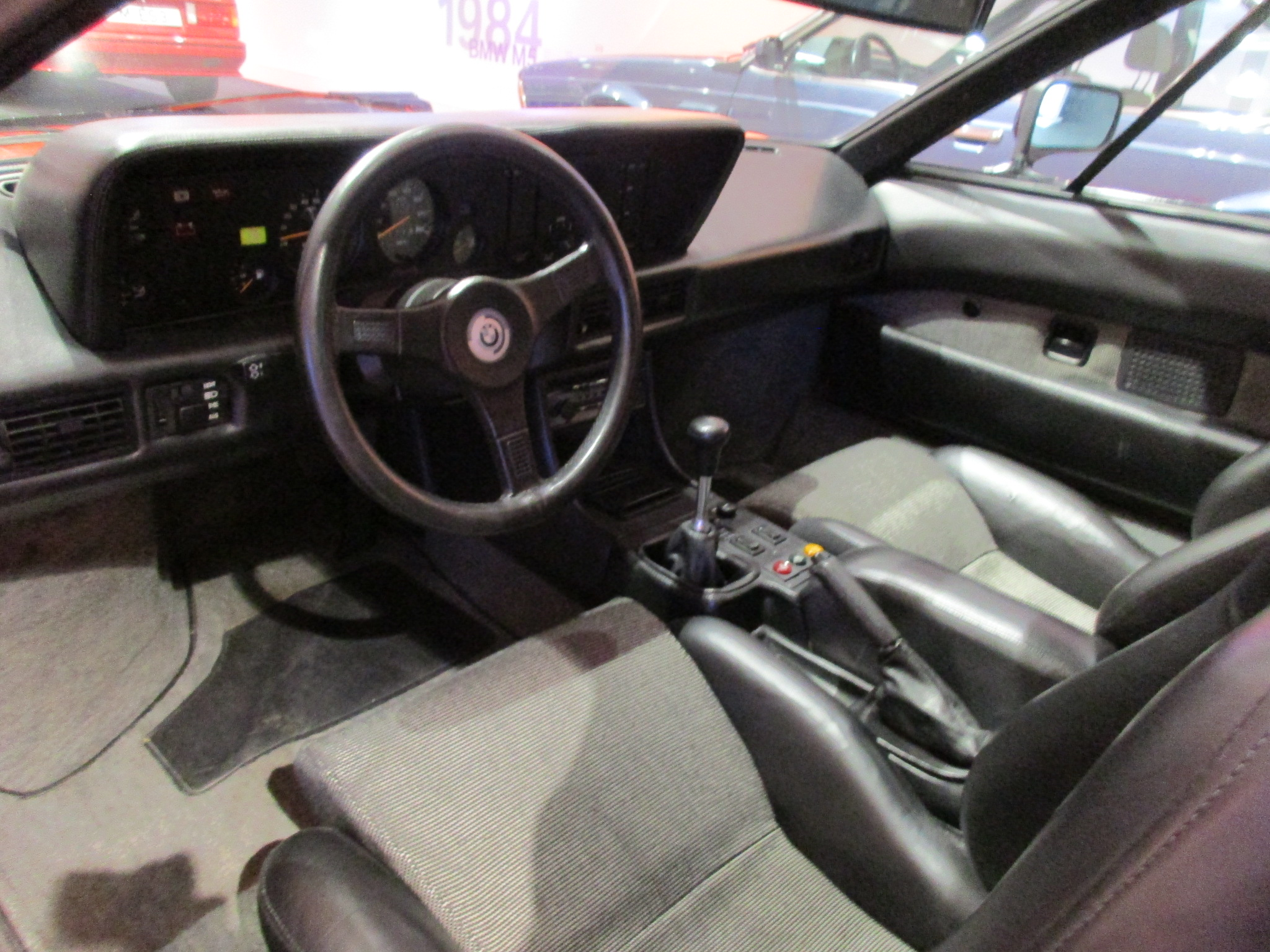
Interior

Reflecting its motorsport roots, the M1 had a fairly basic leather and cloth interior, and used many parts sourced from other BMW models. It offered amenities such as air conditioning, power windows, and a stereo, but provided no seat adjustment, and only left-hand drive was available.

=== Production ===
The fibreglass body of the M1 was manufactured by Italian firm TIR (Trattamento Italiano Resina) which was located in Reggio Emilia, Italy. The chassis was manufactured by a Modenese firm, Marchesi. The body of the car was completed by Italdesign at their manufacturing facility located in Turin along with the interior.

The partly finished cars were then delivered to German specialist manufacturer Baur where final assembly took place by hand. The hand-built M88/1 engines were supplied by BMW from Munich to be installed in the cars. The completed cars were shipped to BMW Motorsport in Munich for final inspection and delivery. Only 453 production cars were built, making it one of BMW's rarest models. Out of the 453, 399 were road going units while 53 were made for motorsport.

=== Accolades ===
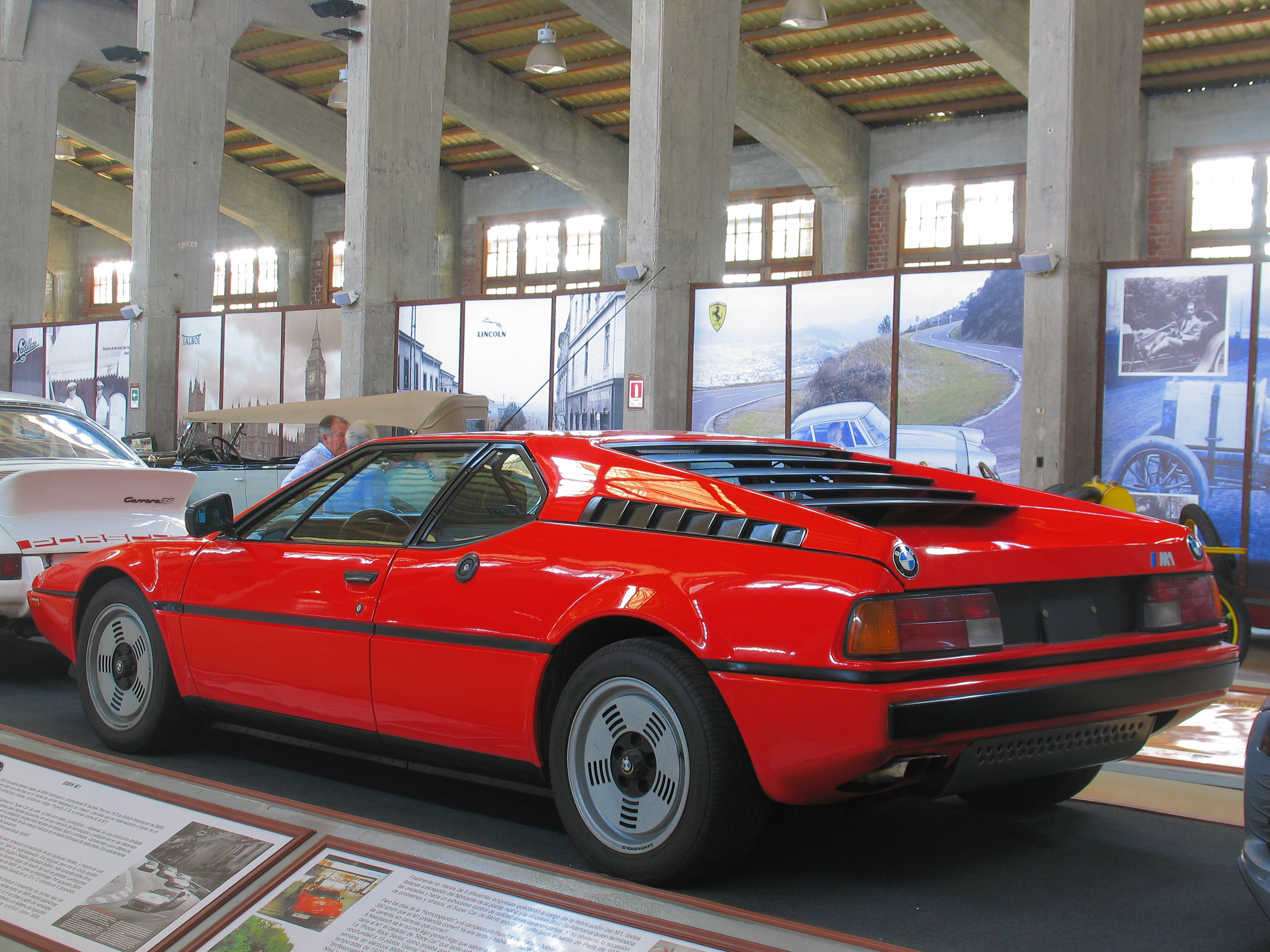
Rear 3/4 view

The M1 had various successes in motorsports. In 2004, Sports Car International placed the car at number ten on their list of top sports cars of the 1970s.

== Motorsport ==
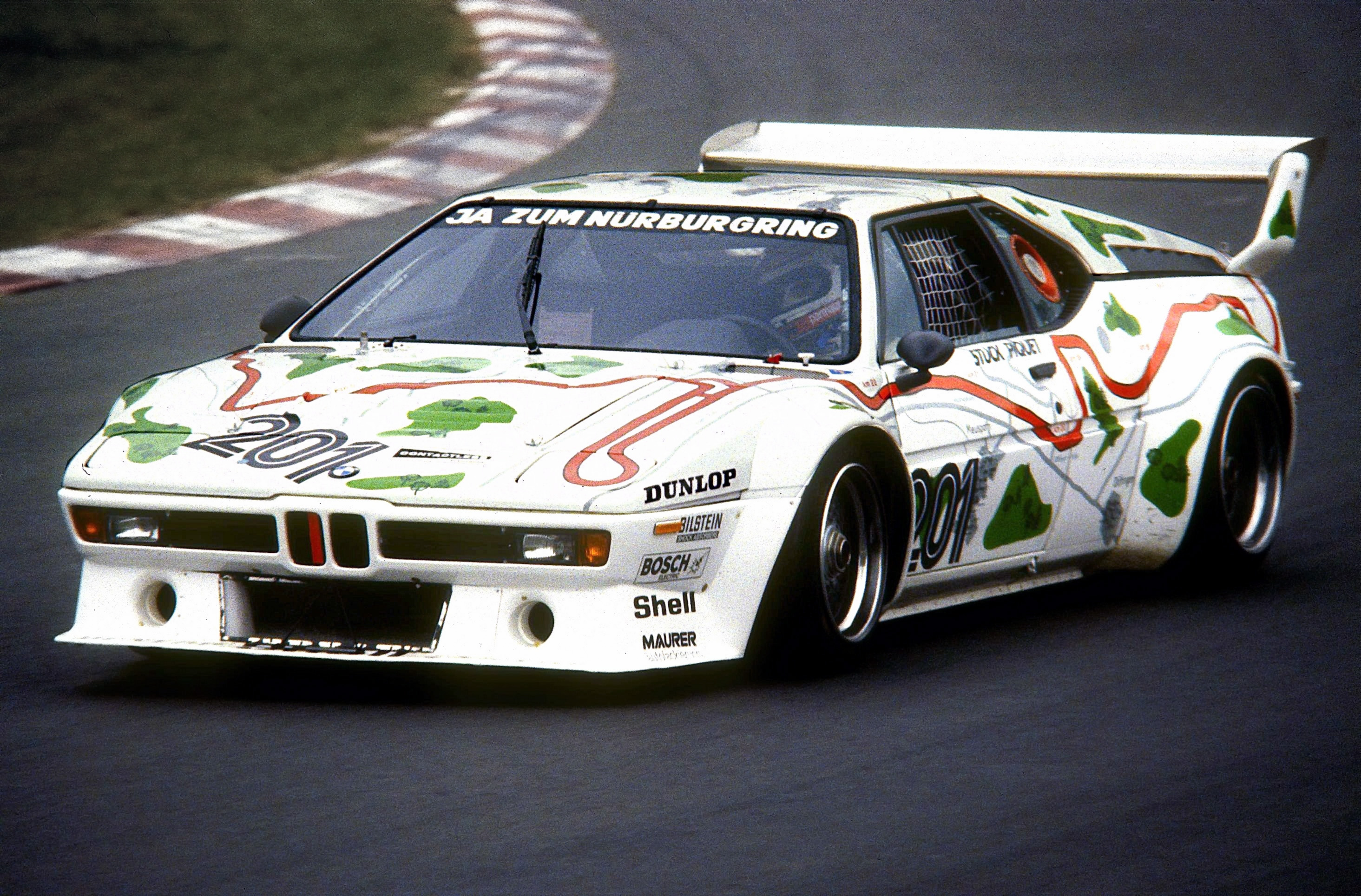
A BMW M1 Procar being driven by Nelson Piquet in 1980 at the Nürburgring

In 1979, the head of BMW Motorsport, Jochen Neerpasch, devised a one-make championship using racing modified M1s. The series was created to aid BMW in building enough cars to enter the group 4 classification in the World Championship for Makes. The new series, known as the "Procar BMW M1 Championship", served as a support series for Formula One, and included many Formula One drivers in identical cars.

In June 1979, Hervé Poulain with Manfred Winkelhock and Marcel Mignot raced an M1 Art Car, with body painted by Andy Warhol, in 1979 24 Hours of Le Mans in IMSA GTX class. They came 2nd in their class and 6th overall.

The series ran for two years, with Niki Lauda winning the 1979 season, and Nelson Piquet the 1980 season. After BMW met the standards for group 4, the Procars were used by various teams in the world championship as well as other national series.

The M1 was also campaigned at the 24 Hours of Le Mans from 1981 to 1986 where it proved competitive. The car was classified as a Group B car for Le Mans purposes, as Group B was also planned for GT class for road races, but were instead eclipsed by Group C prototypes.

An M1 Pro Car was also converted to Group B rally spec by BMW France for the 1982 season. The car was campaigned for the 1983 season as well before the car was entered solely by the Motul privateer racing team for the 1984 season. The 1984 season proved to be the most successful for the M1 as former ERC champion Bernard Béguin won back-to-back at Rallye de La Baule and Rallye de Lorraine that season, and even claimed an outright ERC podium with a second place at the Rallye d'Antibes four months later. The car was not campaigned further after 1984.

== Commemorative cars and spiritual successor ==
=== M1 Homage concept ===
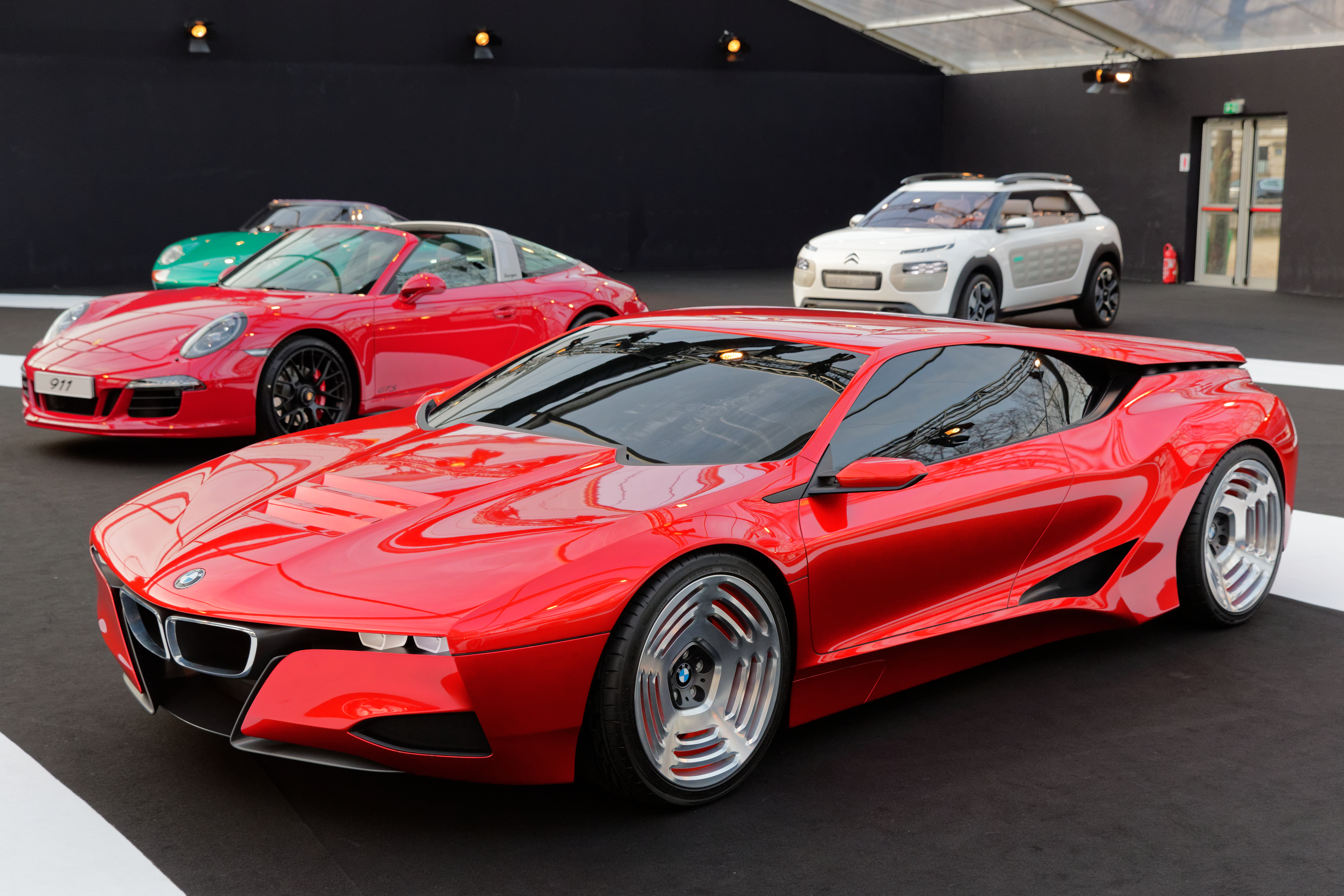

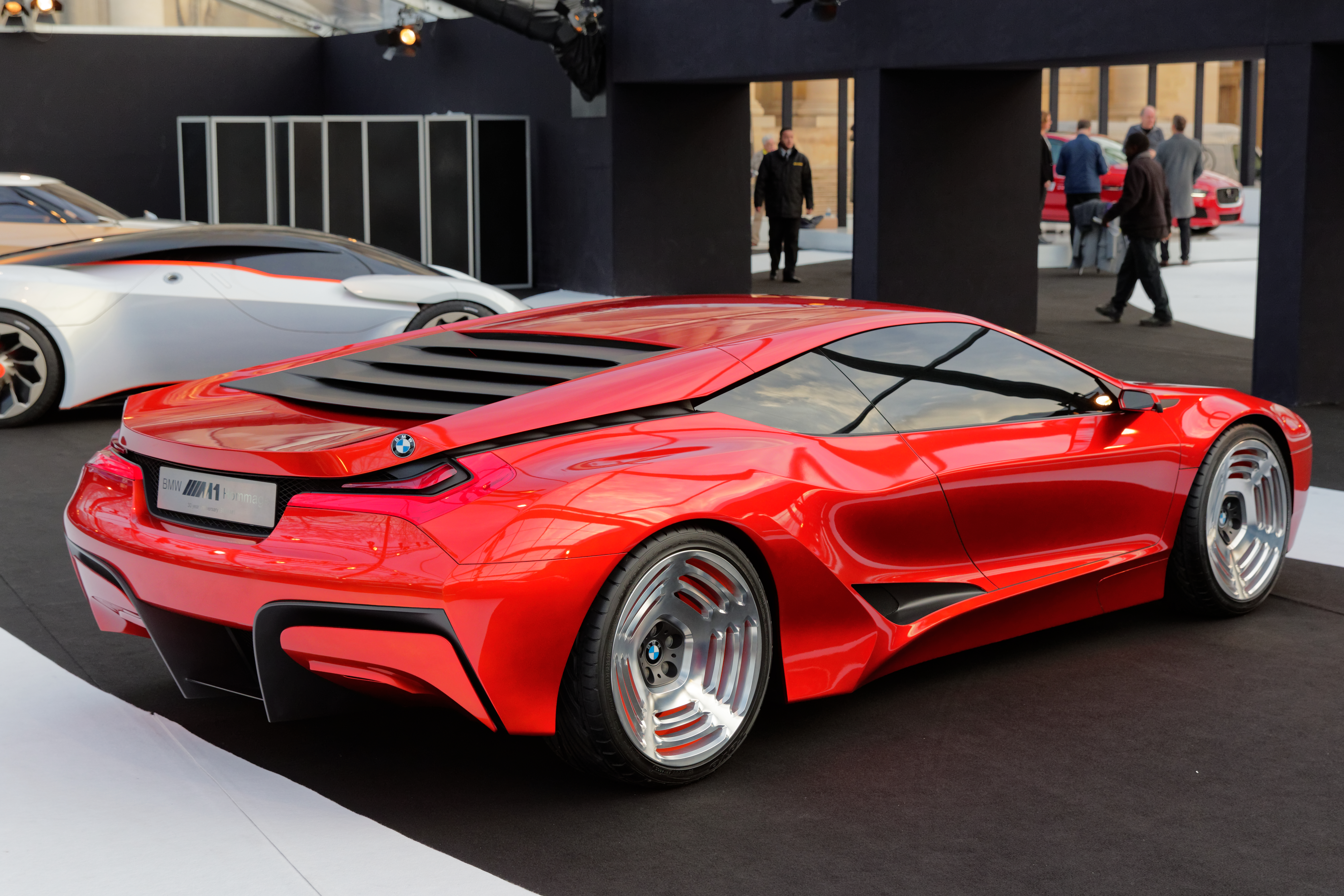
BMW M1 Homage concept

In April 2008, BMW unveiled the M1 Homage concept, to commemorate the 30th anniversary of the M1. The concept vehicle uses a mid-engine layout that borrows styling cues from both the original M1 and the BMW Turbo show car.

The M1 Homage concept was first shown to the public at the Concorso d'Eleganza Villa d'Este of 2008. The design was penned by BMW's in-house design team, inspired by both the original M1 and the BMW Turbo concept designed by Paul Bracq. The BMW Turbo had many technical and advanced innovations from BMW that were part of the inspiration of the M1 Homage concept. The front of the car differs the most from the other parts of the car. The front sports double head lights which are not the same as pop-up type that are on the original M1, but the usual trademark of the kidney grilles is present. The M1 Homage also incorporates the double badge on the back of the car like the original M1. There are no photos of the interior of the car or of the car in action, nor have the specifications of the car been released as the car was meant only to be a design exercise.

=== Vision EfficientDynamics concept and the BMW i8 ===
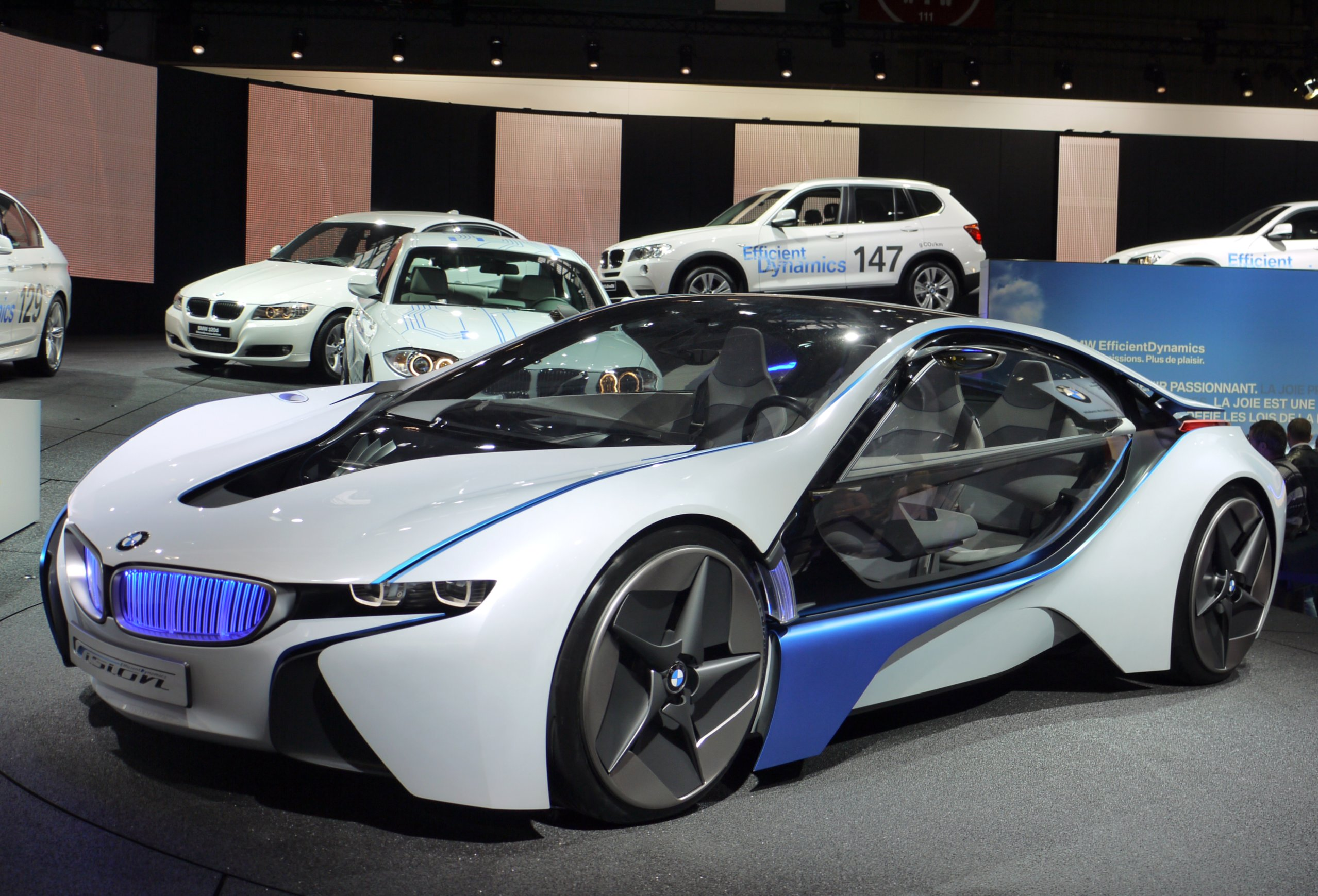
Vision EfficientDynamics concept at the 2010 Paris Motor Show

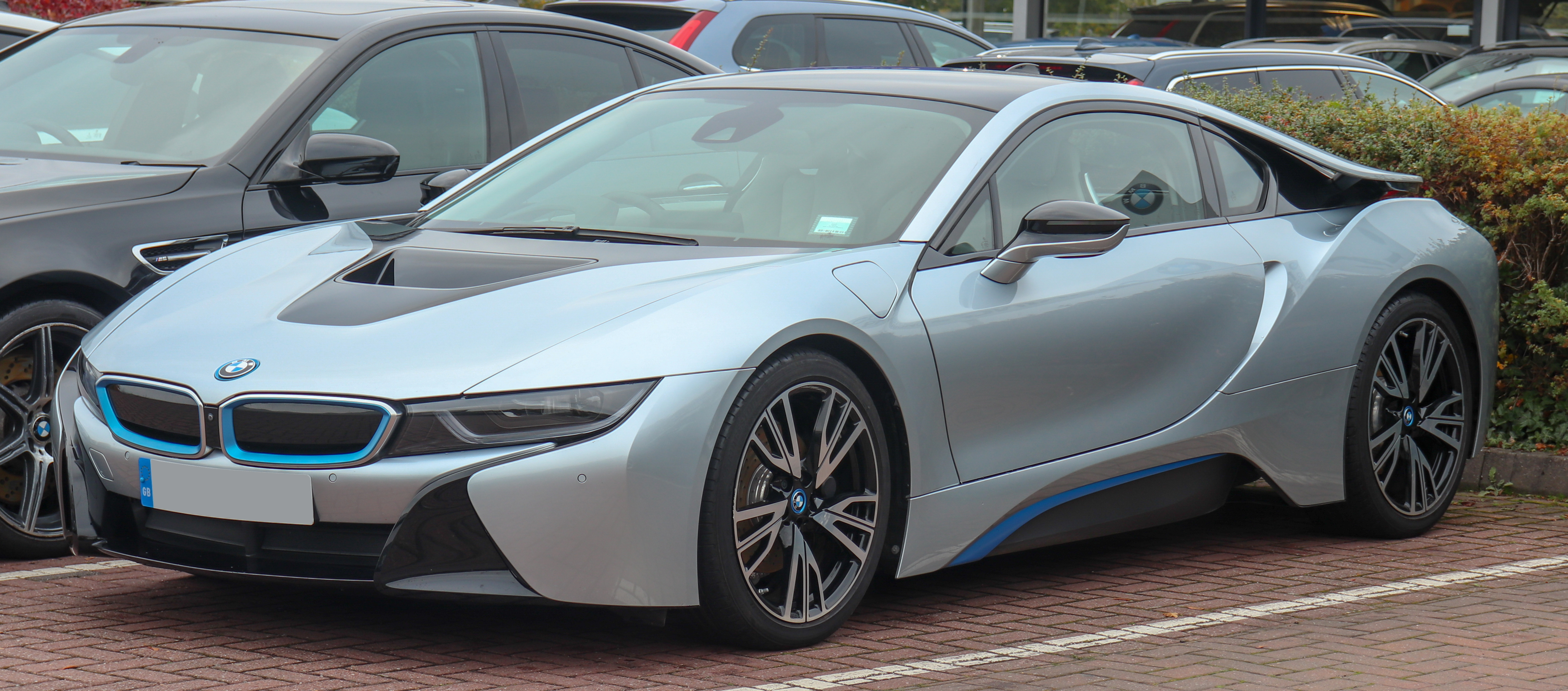
BMW i8 frontal view (production model)

After the M1, BMW designed some mid engined concept cars but none of them inspired a production car until 2013, when the Vision EfficientDynamics concept led to the production of the i8. The BMW i8 is based on the Vision EfficientDynamics concept, which is a range-extender electric car with a three-cylinder turbocharged petrol engine. The production car was designed by Benoit Jacob. Series production of customer vehicles began in April 2014. It is also the first mass-produced mid-engine BMW automobile since the M1.

=== Vision M Next concept ===
The Vision M Next is a plug-in hybrid concept sports car that was showcased in June 2019. The design is partially inspired from the M1, such as louvered rear windows and BMW roundels positioned inside the taillamps. It is powered by the Power PHEV drivetrain system that offers the choice between all-wheel-drive and rear-wheel-drive, with either all-electric propulsion or the power of a turbocharged four-cylinder petrol engine. The total system output is claimed at 441 kW (591 hp; 600 PS). It also has a claimed 0 to 100 km/h (62 mph) acceleration time of 3 seconds and top speed of 300 km/h (186 mph). The maximum range when driving in all-electric mode is claimed to be 100 km (62 miles).

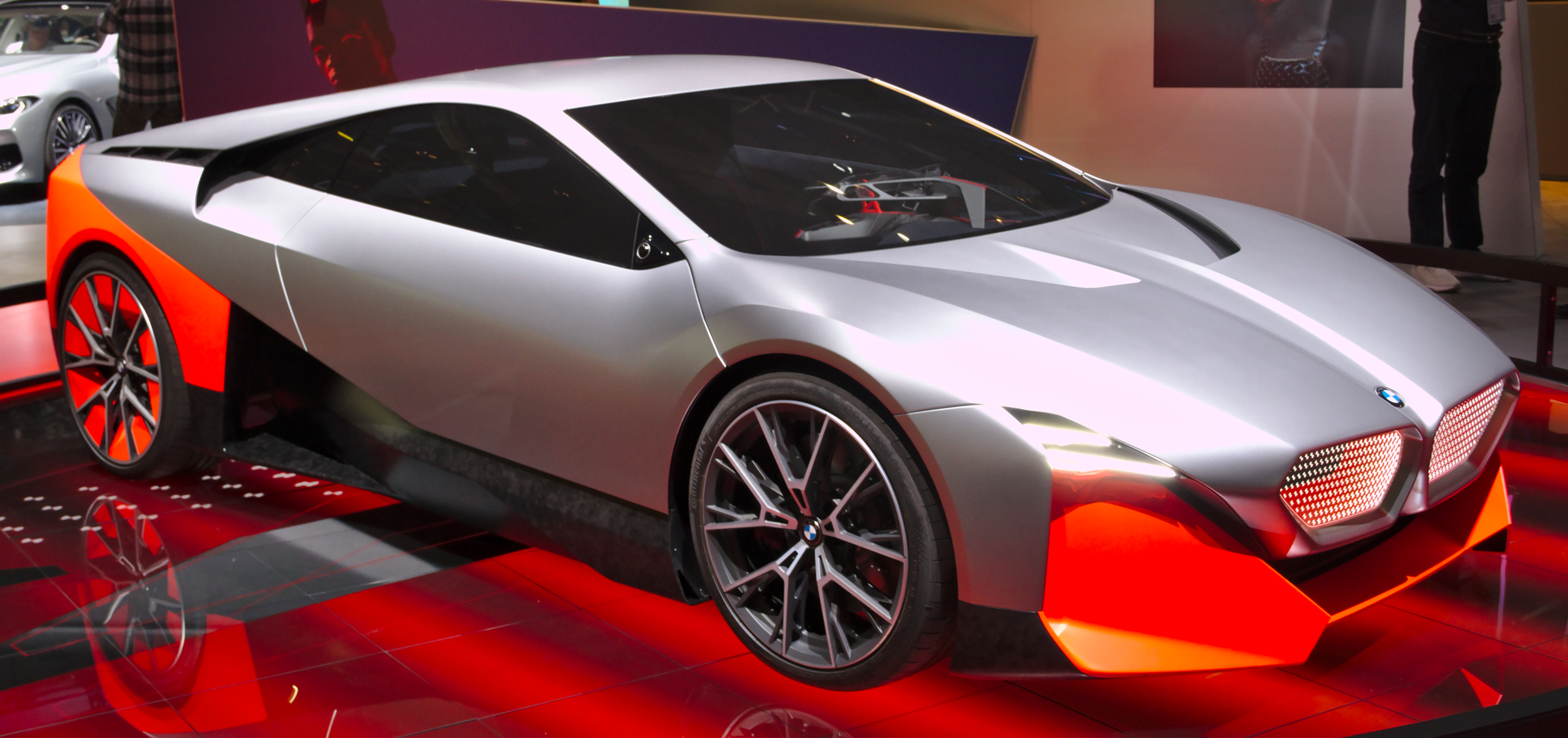

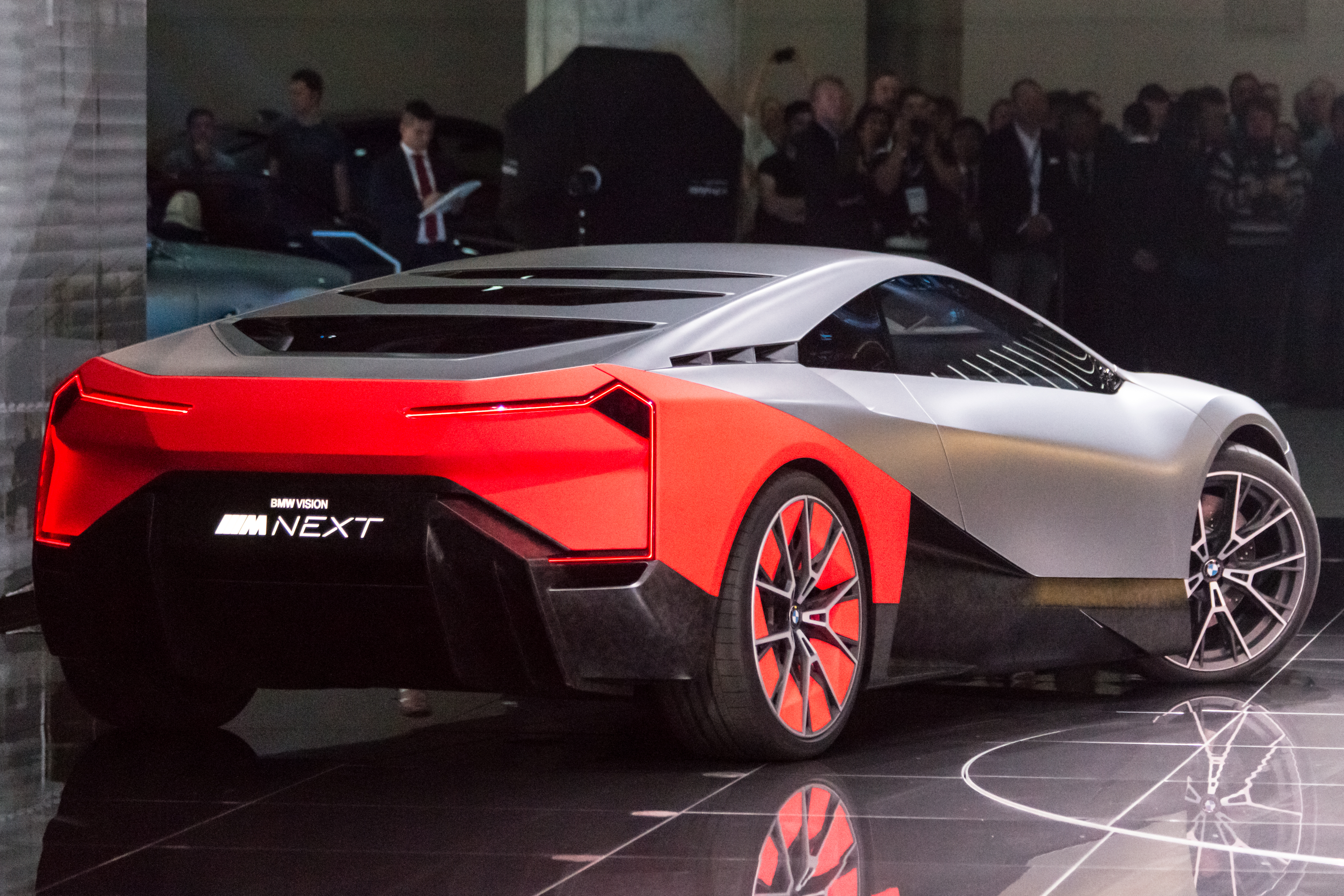

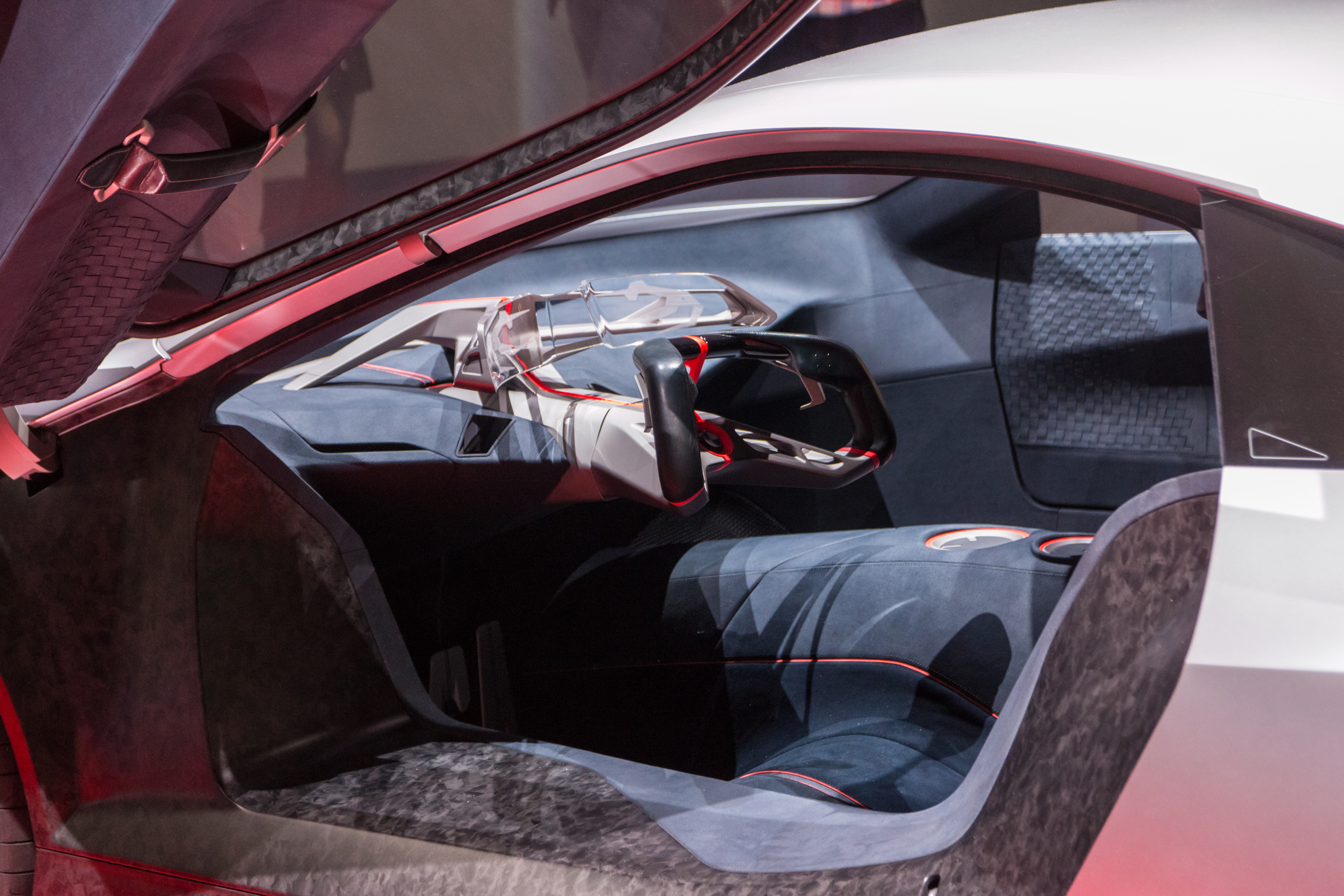

== March-BMW M1/C prototype ==
March-BMW M1/C (BMW-March M1/C) March 81P
- Category: IMSA GTX/GTP
- Constructor: March Engineering; BMW

Technical specifications
- Chassis: Aluminium monocoque, reinforced at key points with carbon fibre honeycomb, and a steel tube sub frame
- Engine: BMW M88 3.5 L (210 cu in) DOHC I6 naturally-aspirated mid-engined BMW M12/9 2.0 L (120 cu in) DOHC I4 turbocharged mid-engined mid engine, longitudinally mounted
- Transmission: Hewland DG300 5-Speed manual
- Power: 650 hp (480 kW) @ 9000 rpm
- Weight: 1,980 lb (900 kg)

Competition history
- Notable entrants: David Hobbs Racing
- Debut: 1981 Los Angeles Times Grand Prix

A highly modified version of the BMW M1, the March-BMW M1/C, also known as the BMW-March M1/C, or simply the March 81P, was an IMSA GTX/GTP sports prototype race car, designed, developed, and built by British constructor March Engineering, in collaboration with German manufacturer BMW, for sports car racing, in 1981.
