= BMW Turbo =

1972 concept sports car

BMW E25 Turbo
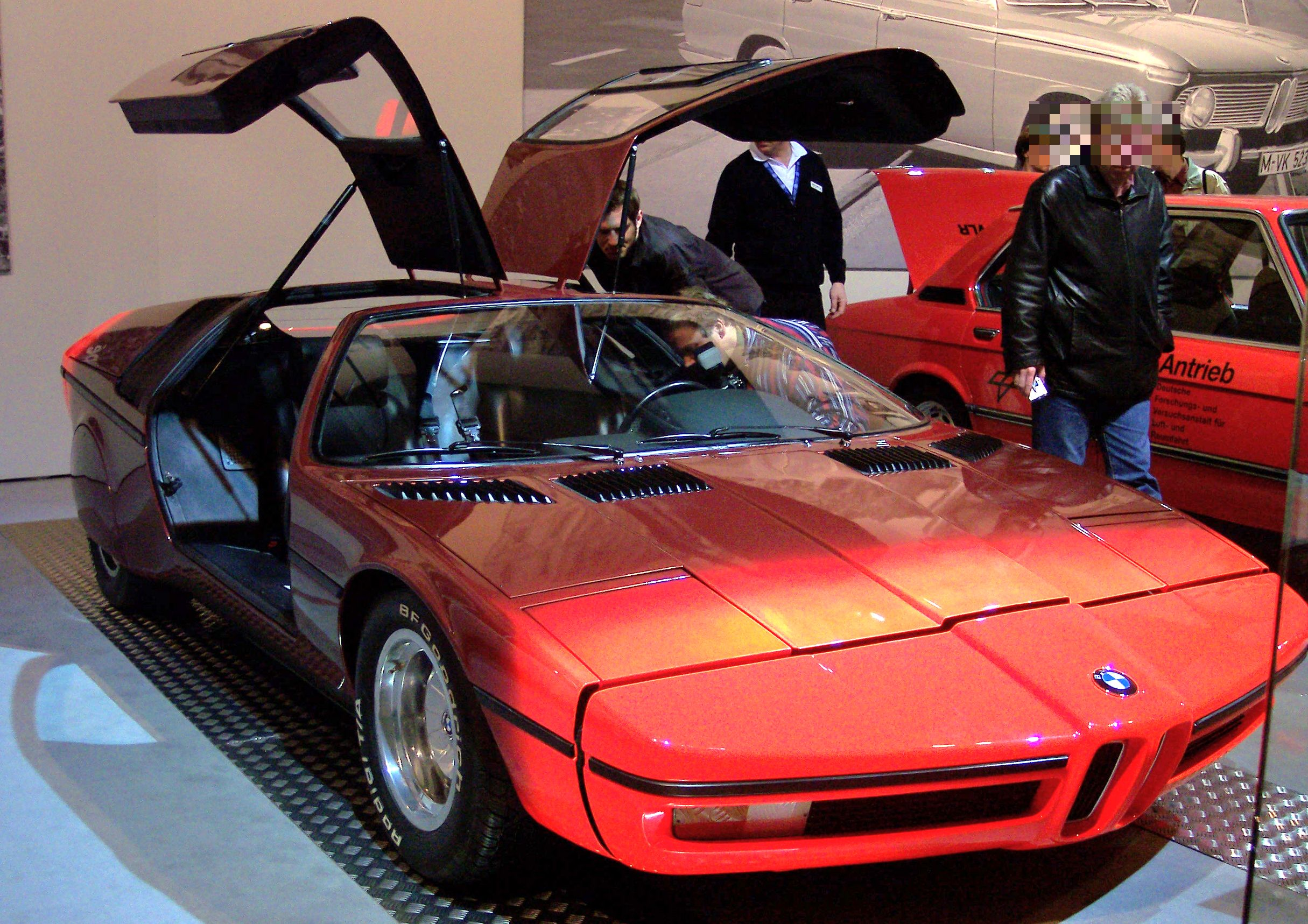

Overview
- Manufacturer: BMW
- Production: 1972; 2 produced
- Designer: Paul Bracq

Body and chassis
- Class: Concept car
- Body style: 2-door coupé
- Layout: Rear mid-engine, rear-wheel-drive

Powertrain
- Engine: 2.0 L turbocharged I4
- Transmission: 4-speed manual

Dimensions
- Wheelbase: 2,400 mm (94.5 in)
- Length: 4,155 mm (163.6 in)
- Width: 1,880 mm (74.0 in)
- Height: 1,100 mm (43.3 in)
- Curb weight: 1,272 kg (2,804.3 lb)

Chronology
- Successor: BMW M1

The BMW E25 Turbo is a concept sports car built by BMW to celebrate the 1972 Summer Olympics in Munich.

== Overview ==
The E25 Turbo was designed by Paul Bracq, with gullwing doors, and was based on a modified 2002 chassis with a mid-mounted engine. The Turbo featured a 276-hp turbocharged version of the engine from the BMW 2002, foam-filled front and rear sections to absorb impact, side impact beams, a braking distance monitor utilizing radar, and a futuristic interior. The car developed 206 kW (280 PS; 276 hp) at 7100 rpm and could reach 100 km/h (62 mph) from a standstill in 6.6 seconds. The top speed was limited to 250 km/h (155 mph).

Only two were ever built. BMW later used the Turbo's design themes on the M1, the 8 Series, the Z1 and, later, the 2008 M1 Homage Concept. The BMW E-25 is, however, most similar to the BMW M1.

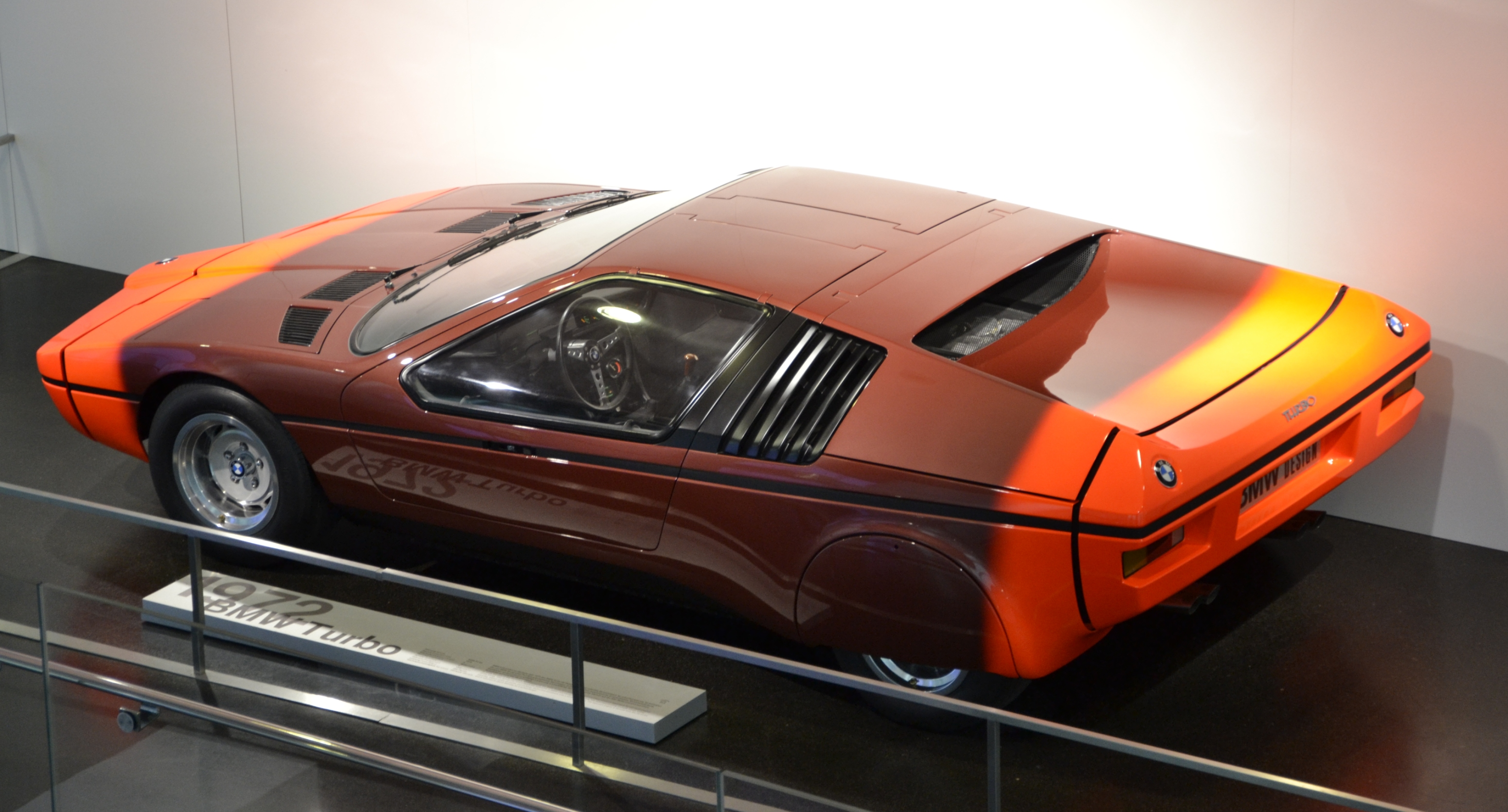
Rear 3/4 view of the Turbo

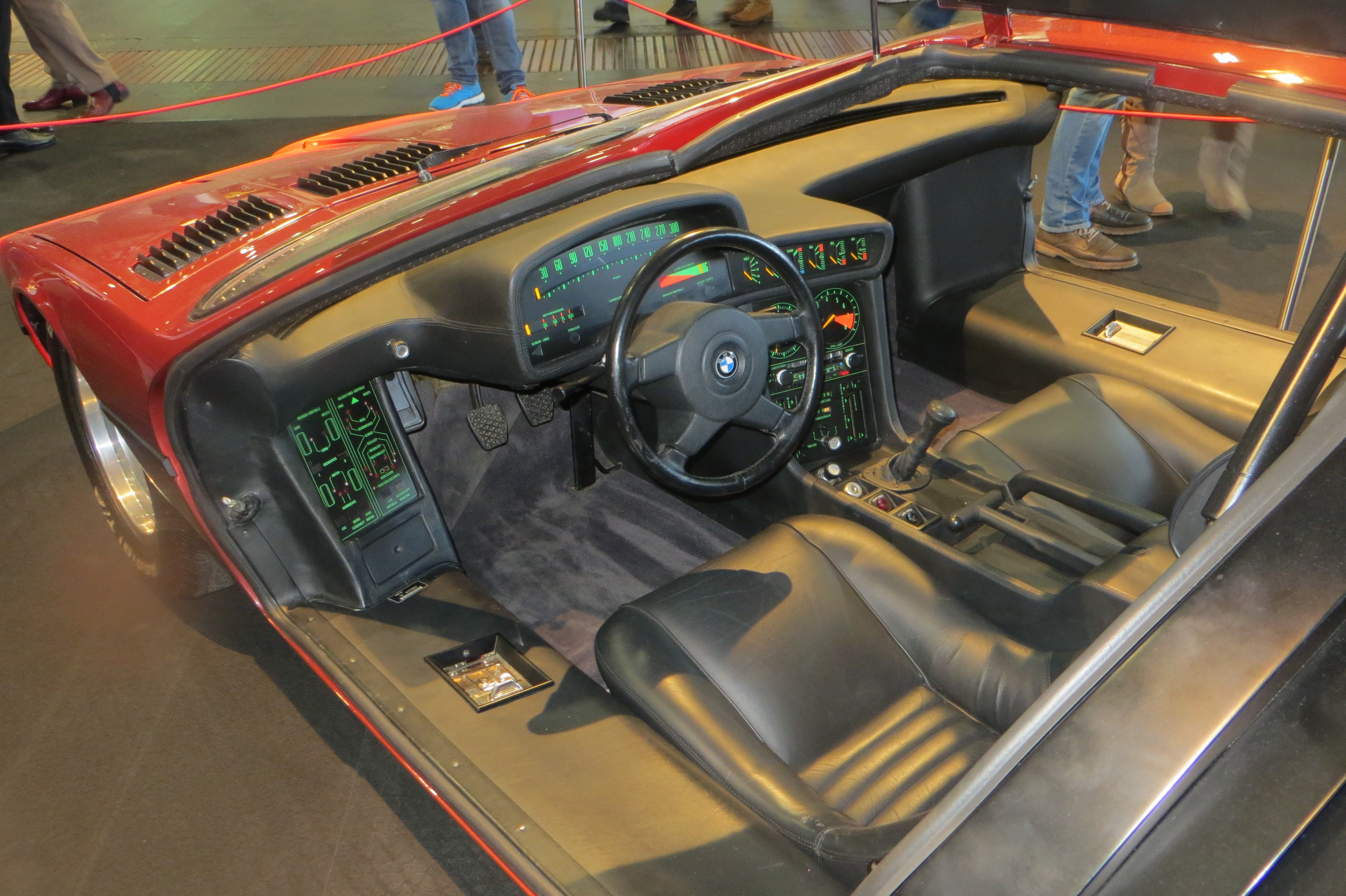
Interior
