= BMW 3 Series (E21) =

First generation of BMW 3 Series

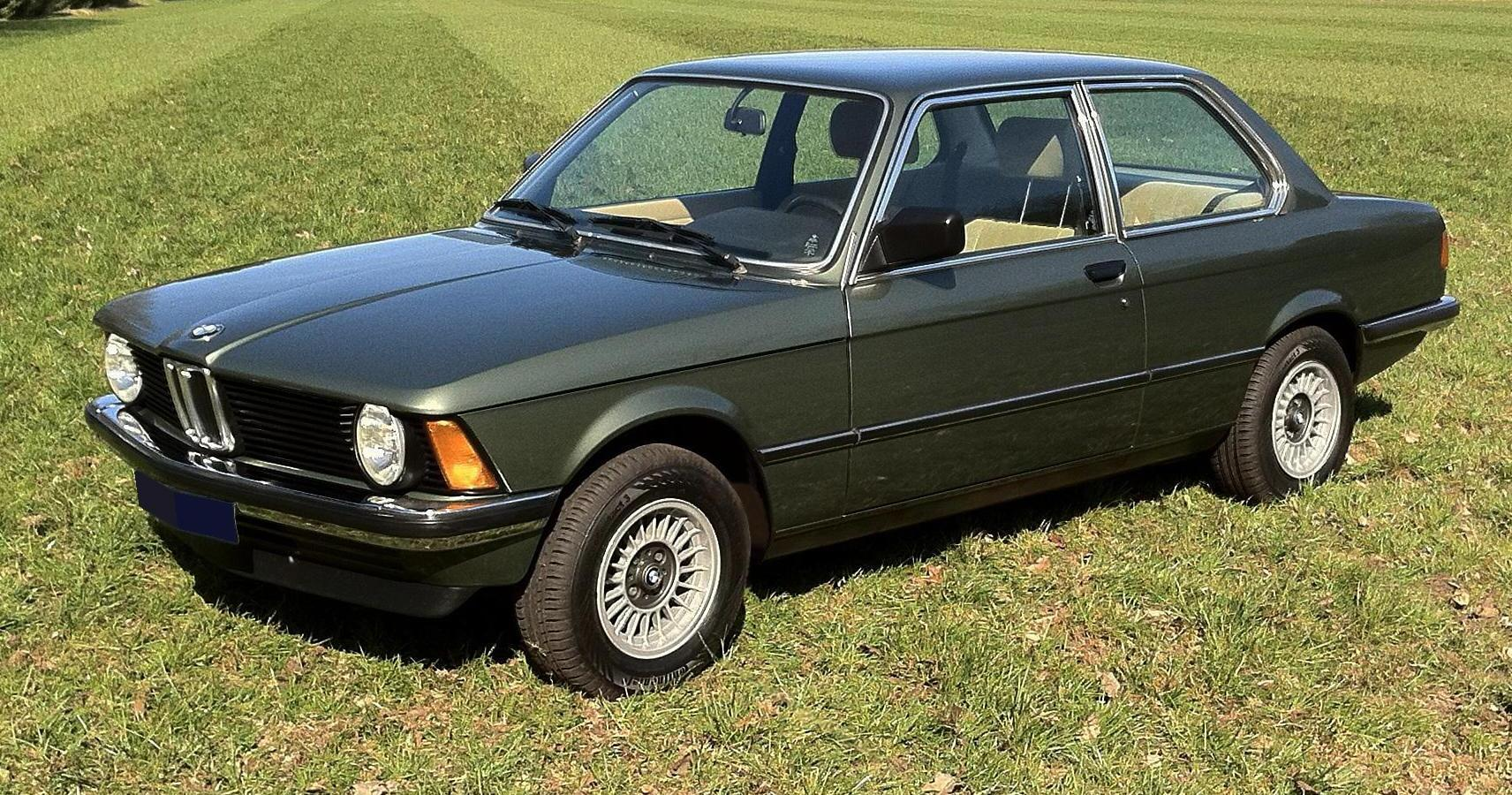

Overview
- Manufacturer: BMW
- Model code: E21
- Production: June 1975 – December 1983
- Model years: 1977–1983 (North America)
- Assembly: West Germany: Munich
- Designer: Paul Bracq

Body and chassis
- Class: Compact executive (D)
- Body style: 2-door saloon; 2-door convertible
- Layout: Rear-wheel drive

Powertrain
- Engine: 1.6–2.0 L M10 I4; 2.0–2.3 L M20 I6
- Transmission: 4-speed manual; 5-speed manual; 3-speed ZF 3HP automatic

Dimensions
- Wheelbase: 2,563 mm (100.9 in)
- Length: 4,355 mm (171.5 in); Except US: 4,508 mm (177.5 in)
- Width: 1,610 mm (63.4 in)
- Height: 1,380 mm (54.3 in)
- Curb weight: 1,020–1,180 kg (2,250–2,600 lb)

Chronology
- Predecessor: BMW 02 Series
- Successor: BMW 3 Series (E30)

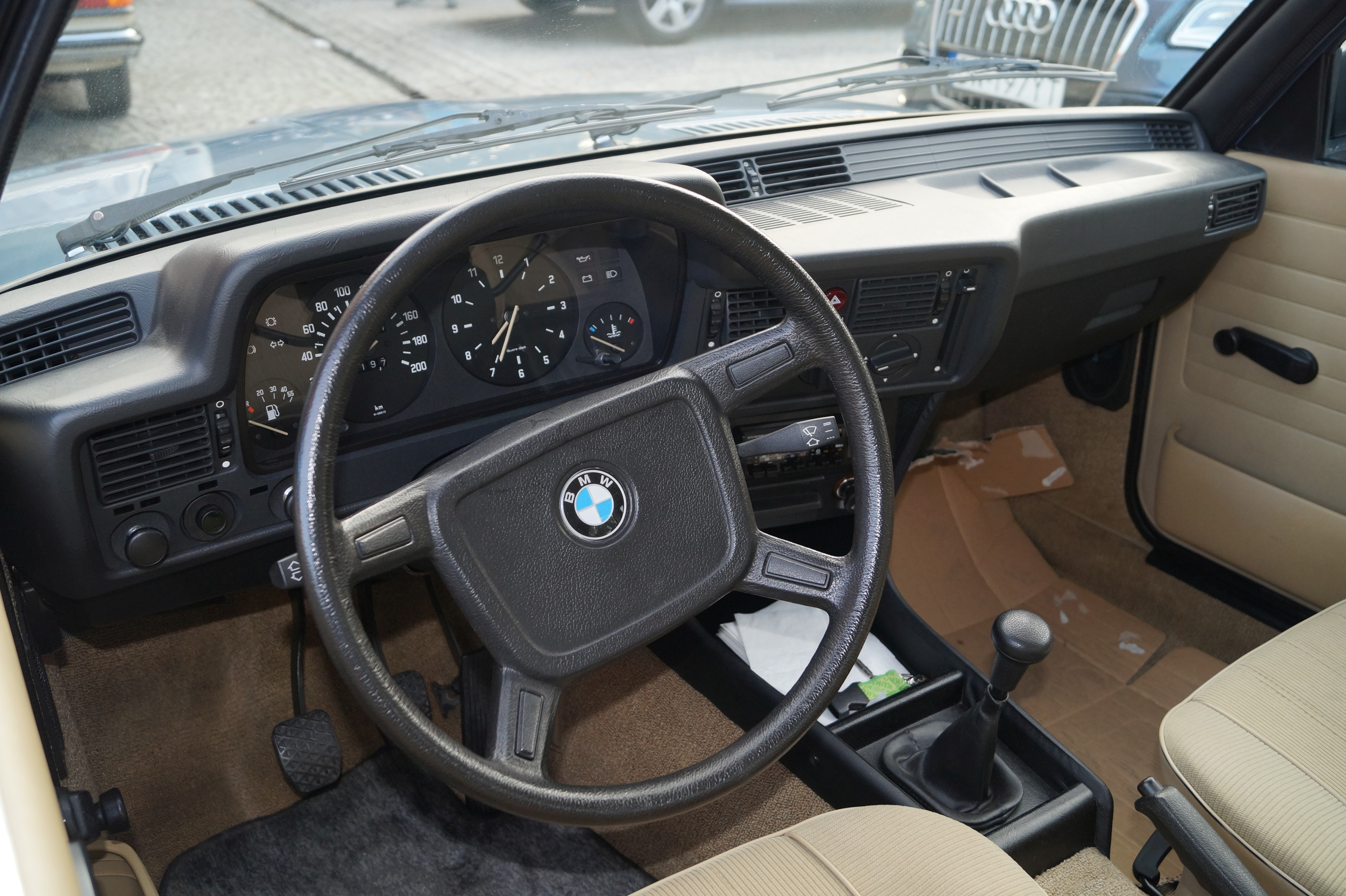
Interior of post-1979 facelift

The BMW E21 is the first generation of the BMW 3 Series, a range of compact executive cars. The E21 was produced from June 1975 to December 1983 and replaced the BMW 02 Series. The series was exclusively built in a sporty two-door sedan / coupé body-style (except for convertibles made by Baur). Contrary to its predecessor, a 'Touring' body with a sloped rear hatch was no longer offered. Six-cylinder models were made immediately recognizable by quad round headlights, instead of the basic two.

Initial models were produced with carburetted four-cylinder petrol engines of 1.6 L, 1.8 L, and 2.0 L. Fuel-injection was introduced in late 1975 on the 320i – but in 1977, a carburetted inline 6-cylinder engine replaced both the 320 and 320i models, while a detuned version of the four-cylinder injection went on sale in the United States. In 1978, the 3-series received its first fuel-injected six-cylinder in the 323i as a flagship performance model; and in 1981, a bottom end detuned 1.6 L was offered in the 315.

The cabriolet body style, manufactured by Baur, was produced from 1978 to 1981, with all available engines.

There was no BMW M3 model for the E21 generation, but several limited edition models were produced based on the model with the largest engine, the six-cylinder 323i.

The E21 was replaced by the E30 3 Series in 1982.

== Development ==
Under the direction of its majority (51%) shareholder, Herbert Quandt, BMW decided upon a replacement for the ageing BMW 02 Series.

In July 1975, BMW's Board of Management introduced the E21 to the public at the Munich Olympic Stadium.

== Styling ==
The frontal view of the new car was dominated by the BMW trademark kidney grille standing out clearly from the radiator cover. The styling of the new car bore a resemblance to the E12 5 Series which was in production as the E21 was introduced. Like many other BMW models, the C-pillar of the E21 has a Hofmeister kink.

Paul Bracq, Director of Design at BMW from 1970 to 1974, is credited with setting the design direction of the E21.

The BMW E21 is according to the Design Museum London one of "fifty cars that changed the world".

== Interior ==
The cockpit design of the E21 marked the introduction of a new design concept, with the center console and central dashboard area angled towards the driver. The instruments are arranged as Fuel, Speed, Engine Revs, and Water Temperature from left to right as viewed, copied from the 1936 328 sports car. These features have become part of BMW's interior design philosophy for many years. As a sign of passive safety, all edges and control elements within the interior were rounded off and padded.

The 1979 facelift revised the centre section of the dashboard, replacing the slider heat and ventilation controls with rotary knobs. The centre stack had much better provision for a revised air conditioning system. The analog centre clock was replaced with a digital one below the instrument cluster.

== Engines ==
Model	Years	Engine	Displacement	Power	Torque	Headlights
315	1981–1983	M10 (M98) carb I4	1573 cc	55 kW (75 PS) at 5,800 rpm	110 N⋅m (81 lb⋅ft) at 3,200 rpm	Single
316	1975–1980	M10 (M41) carb I4	1573 cc	66 kW (90 PS) at 6,000 rpm	123 N⋅m (91 lb⋅ft) at 3,000 rpm	Single
316	1980–1982	M10B18 carb I4	1766 cc	66 kW (90 PS) at 5,500 rpm	140 N⋅m (103 lb⋅ft) at 4,000 rpm	Single
318	1975–1980	M10B18 carb I4	1766 cc	72 kW (98 PS) at 5800 rpm	143 N⋅m (105 lb⋅ft) at 4,000 rpm	Single
318i	1980–1982	M10B18 injected I4	1766 cc	77 kW (105 PS) at 5,800 rpm	145 N⋅m (107 lb⋅ft) at 4,500 rpm	Single
320	1975–1977	M10 (M43) carb I4	1990 cc	80 kW (109 PS) at 5,800 rpm	157 N⋅m (116 lb⋅ft) at 3,700 rpm	Twin
320/6	1977–1982	M20B20 carb I6	1991 cc	90 kW (122 PS) at 6,000 rpm	160 N⋅m (118 lb⋅ft) at 4,000 rpm	Twin
320i	1975–1977	M10 (M64) injected I4	1990 cc	92 kW (125 PS) at 5,700 rpm	172 N⋅m (127 lb⋅ft) at 4,350 rpm	Twin
320i (US)	1977–1979	M10B20 injected I4	1990 cc	82 kW (112 PS; 110 bhp) at 5,700 rpm CA: 78 kW (106 PS; 105 bhp)	152 N⋅m (112 lb⋅ft) at 4,000 rpm	Twin
320i (US)	1980–1983 (Note: A version with sportier equipment was sold as the 320iS from 1981 until 1983.)	M10B18 injected I4	1766 cc	75 kW (102 PS; 101 bhp) at 5,800 rpm	136 N⋅m (100 lb⋅ft) at 4,500 rpm	Twin
323i	1978–1982	M20B23 injected I6	2315 cc	105 kW (143 PS) at 5,800 rpm	190 N⋅m (140 lb⋅ft) at 4,500 rpm	Twin

=== 315 ===
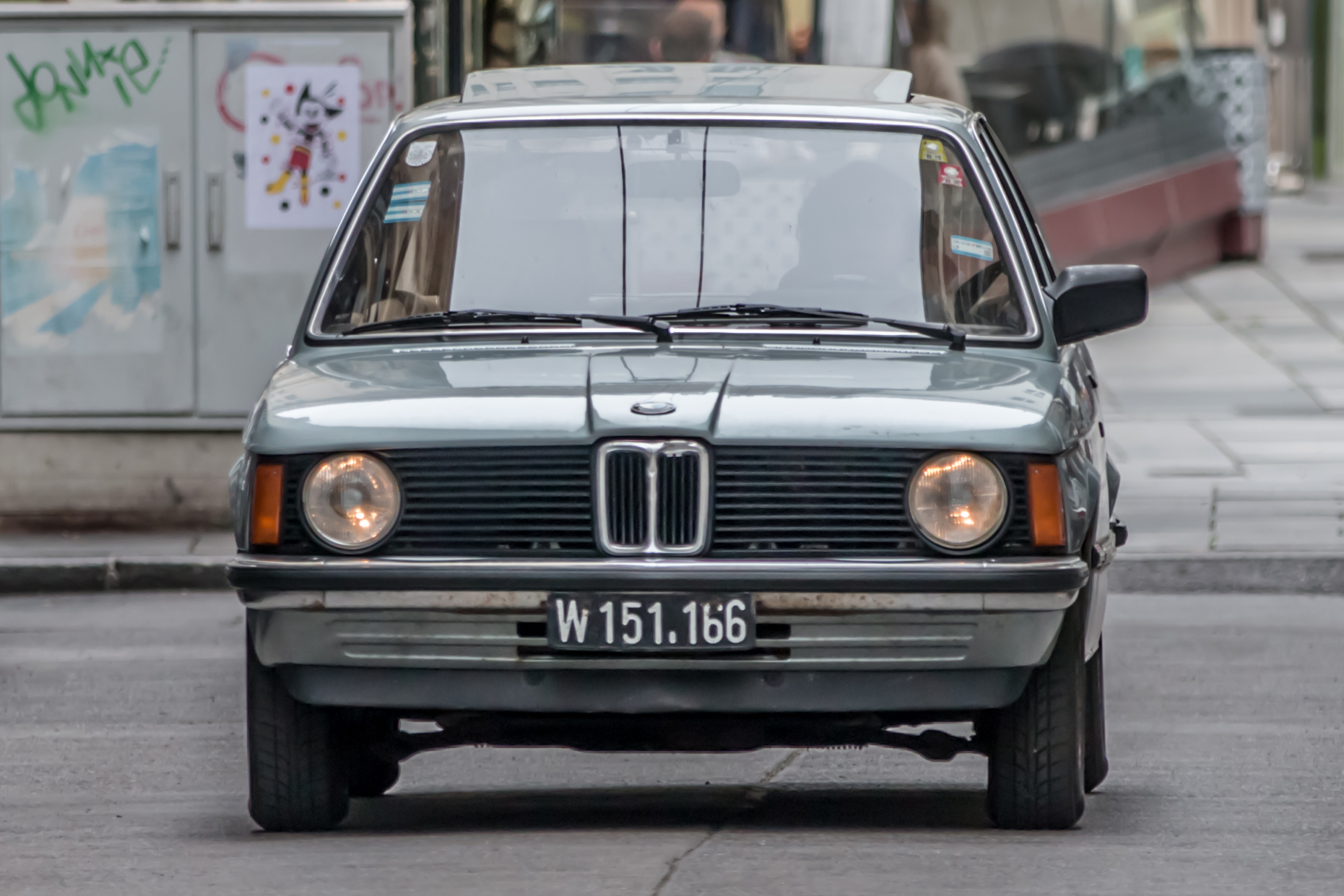
The BMW 315 is easily distinguishable from other E21 models by its headlamps: Instead of halogen bulbs, it has R2 twin-filament bulbs

The 315 was the base model from March 1981 to 1983 and remained on sale up into 1984 for some markets, alongside the new E30. It has a 75 PS (55 kW; 74 hp) version of the 316's 1.6-litre engine, tuned for fuel economy. It accelerates to 100 km/h in 14.8 seconds and has a top speed of 154 km/h (96 mph). In an effort to further lower the price, the 315 also had bumpers with exposed screws, a vinyl-covered parcel shelf (this was carpeted on all other E21 models), no map pockets on the doors, R2 double filament headlamps (rather than halogen units), and a single external mirror.

=== 316 ===
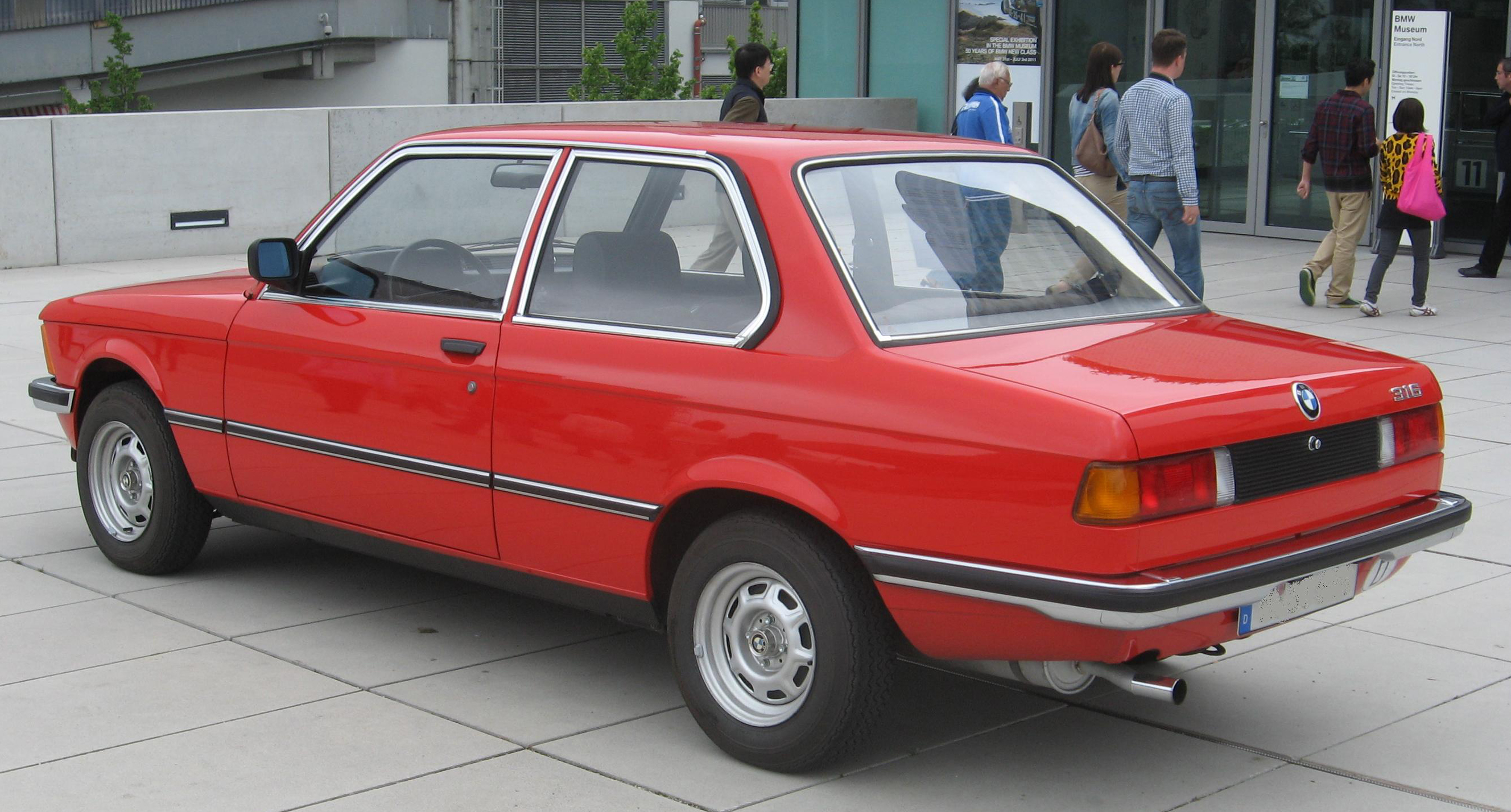
BMW 316

The 316 was the base model for years 1975 to 1981, fitted with a 1.6 L (98 cu in) M10 engine producing 90 PS (66 kW; 89 hp). It accelerates to 100 km/h (62 mph) in 14 seconds and has a top speed of 160 km/h (99 mph).

In 1980 the engine size increased to 1.8 litres (after the 318 carburetor version was discontinued), while the model badge remained "316". Power remained 90 PS (66 kW; 89 hp) but top speed increased to 163 km/h (101 mph).

=== 318 ===
The 318 was a mid-range model that was powered by a carburetted four-cylinder engine, producing 98 PS (72 kW; 97 hp). It accelerates to 100 km/h in 12 seconds and has a top speed of 165 km/h (103 mph).

=== 318i ===
In 1980, the carburetted 318 was dropped and replaced by the fuel injected 318i. It accelerates to 100 km/h in 11.5 seconds and has a top speed of 173 km/h (107 mph).

In Sweden, the 318i was badged 320i and had twin headlights. This was the result of the 2-liter engine not passing Sweden's particular emissions standards at the time, which also restricted the output of the engine to 102 PS (75 kW) in Sweden as well as Switzerland.

=== 320 ===
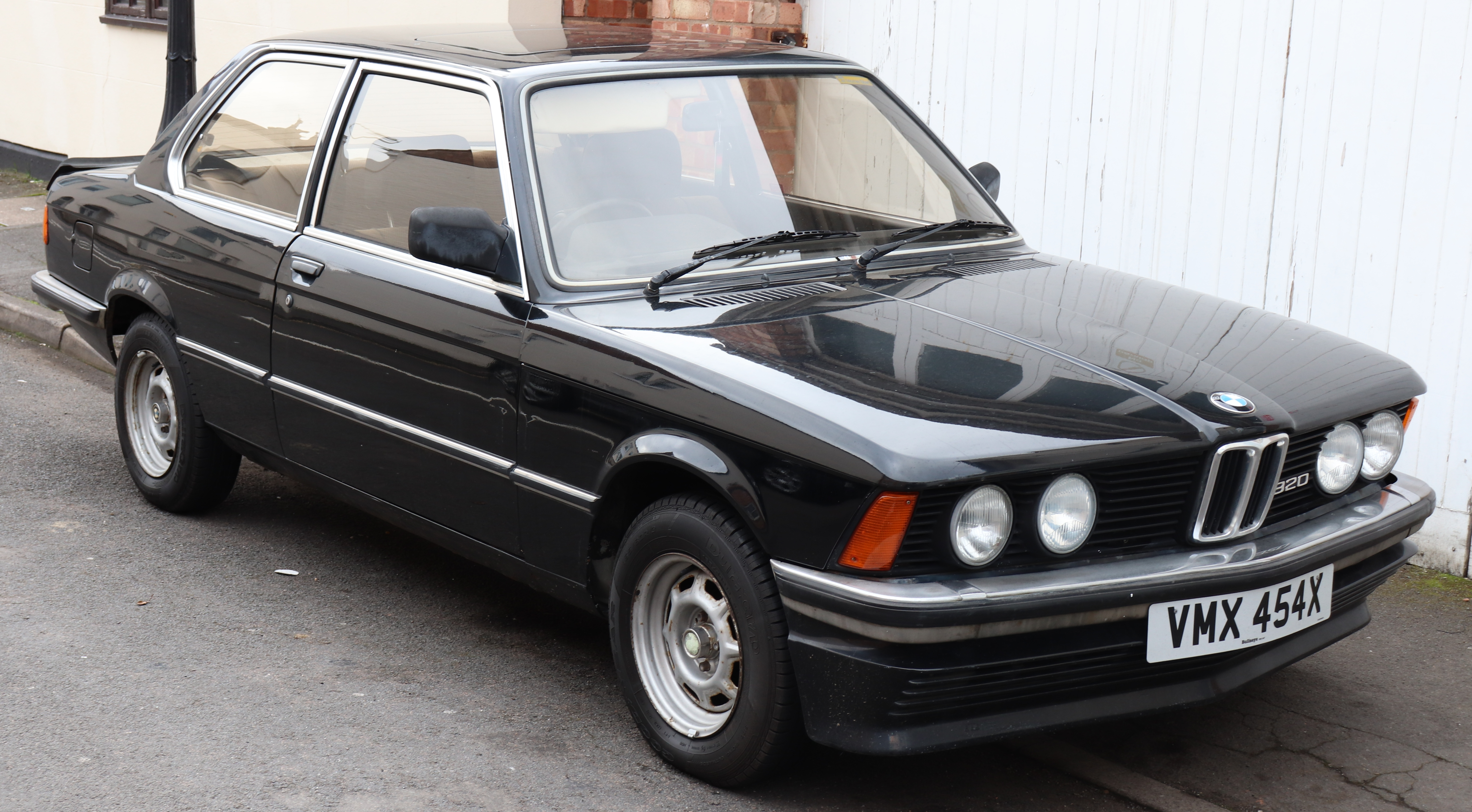
320 model with twin headlights

The initial 320 model was powered by a four-cylinder engine using a Solex 2-barrel downdraft carburettor. It accelerates to 100 km/h (62 mph) in 11.5 seconds and has a top speed of 170 km/h (106 mph).

=== 320i ===
The 320i was released in late 1975. It has a continuous port injection system (Bosch K-Jetronic) instead of a carburetor. It accelerates to 100 km/h (62 mph) in 10.5 seconds and has a top speed of 180 km/h (112 mph).

=== 320/6 ===
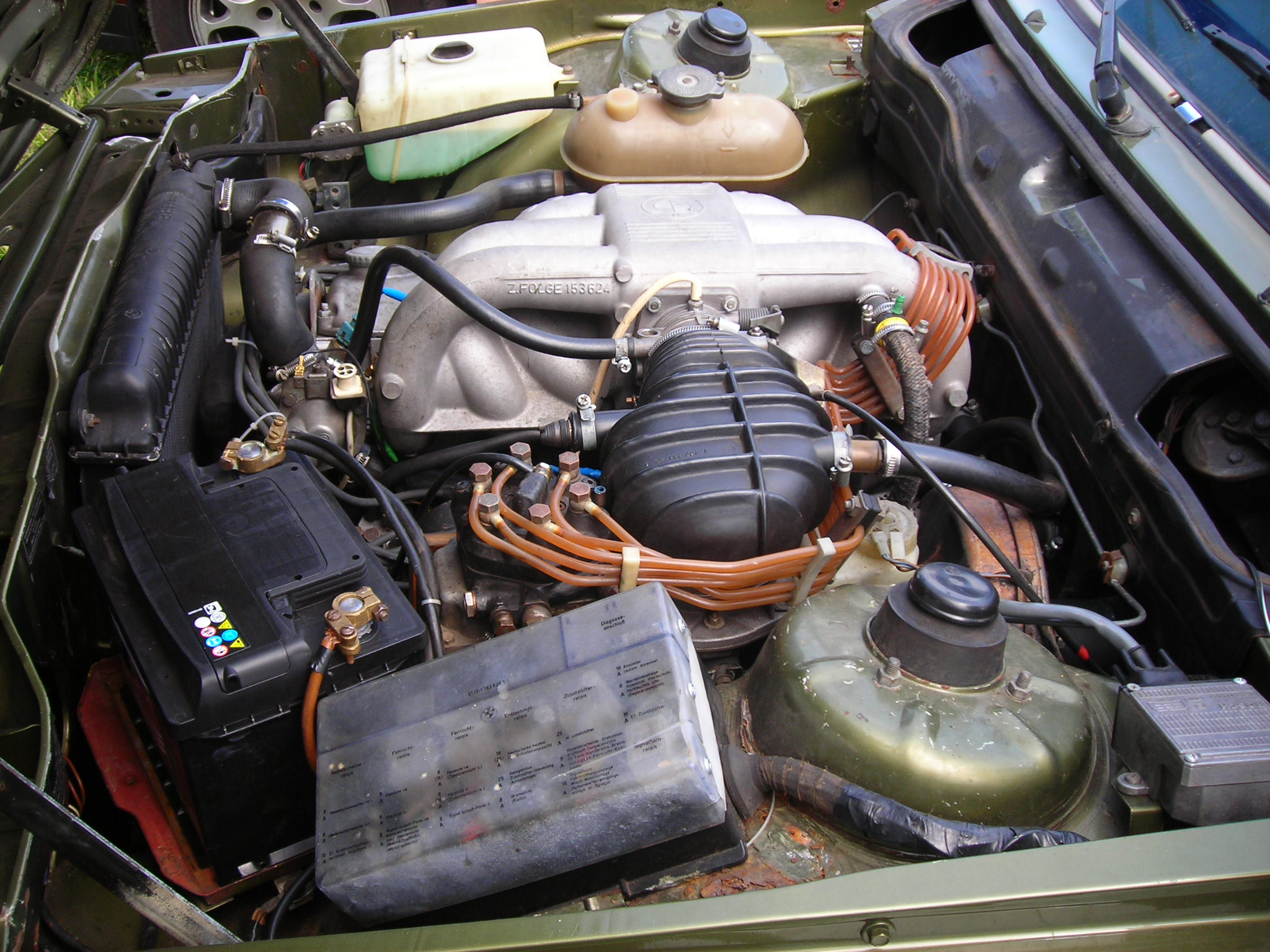
M20 six-cylinder engine

In 1977, the 320 model switched from the BMW M10 four-cylinder engine to the BMW M20 straight-six petrol engine. Although they remained badged as "320", the six-cylinder model is often referred to as "320/6". The engine uses a Solex 4-barrel downdraft carburetor. The 320/6 accelerates to 100 km/h (62 mph) in 10.0 seconds and has a top speed of 181 km/h (112 mph).

=== 323i ===
The 323i was the flagship E21 performance model following its introduction in 1977. It is powered by a 2.3-litre six-cylinder engine using Bosch K-Jetronic fuel-injection. It accelerates to 100 km/h (62 mph) in 8.7 seconds and has a top speed of 190 km/h (118 mph).

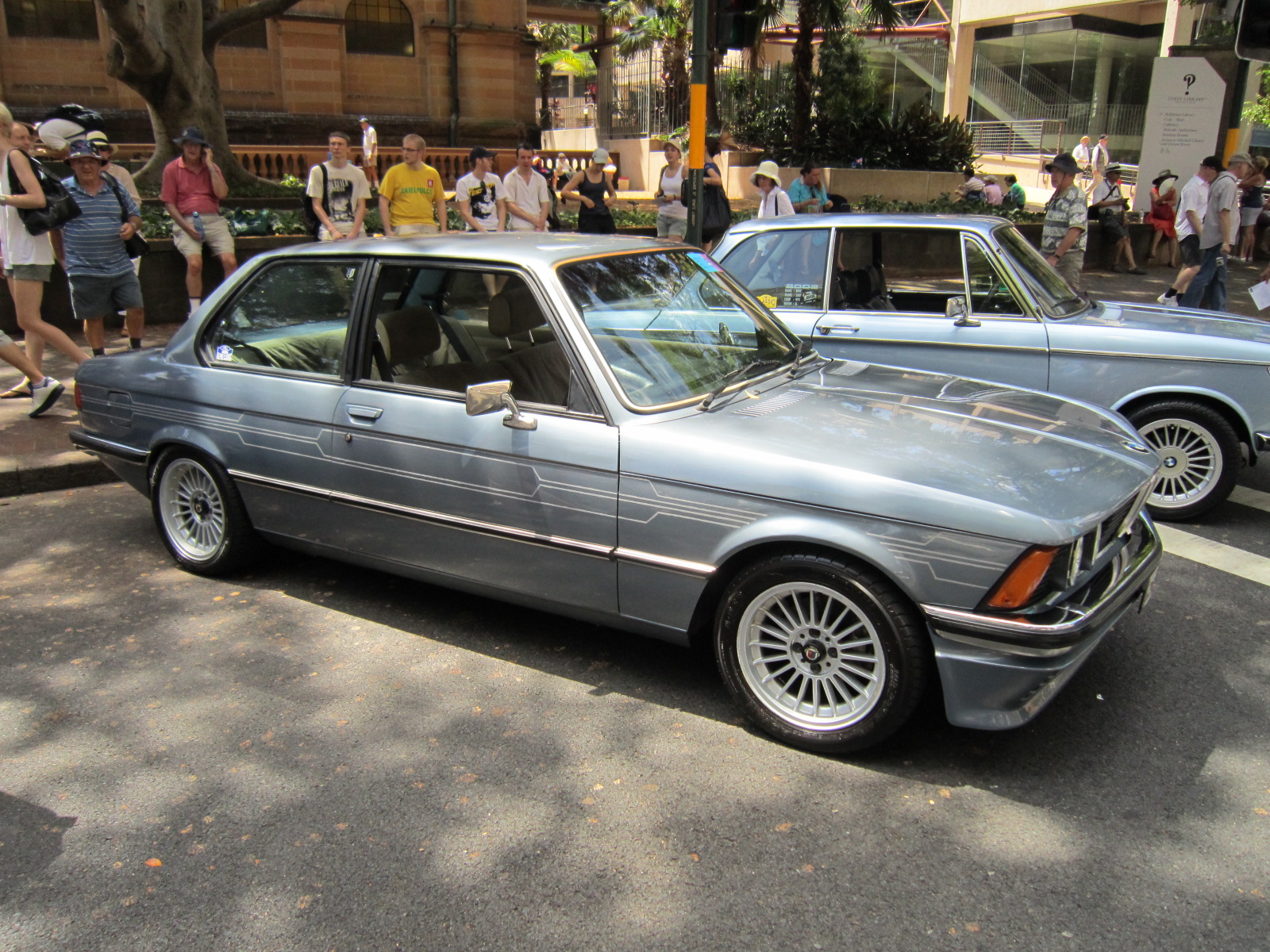
323i Alpina C1

== Transmissions ==
- 3-speed ZF 3HP22 automatic (318 and 320)
- 4-speed Getrag 242 manual
- 5-speed Getrag 245 manual, with either an overdrive fifth gear or close-ratio gearing (the latter available from 1976).

== Chassis and suspension ==
With a wheelbase measuring 2.6 m (102 in), the lengths of the overhanging front and rear bodywork was minimal. The track measured 1,364 mm (53.7 in) at the front, and 1,377 mm (54.2 in) at the rear.

The suspension incorporated rack and pinion steering and MacPherson strut suspension at the front, and semi-trailing arm type independent suspension at the rear. The rear suspension design causes camber changes, which can introduce oversteer at the handling limits. The power assisted brakes were discs on the front wheels, while the rear wheels had drum brakes (except the 323i model which had discs all round).

== Model year changes ==
At the E21's release, three models were available: with 316 (1.6-litre), 318 (1.8-litre) and 320 (2.0-litre) versions of the BMW M10 four-cylinder engine. To differentiate between models, the 320 model came with dual headlights, while the 316 and 318 had single headlights.

=== 1975 ===
The fuel-injected 320i was introduced at the end of 1975. It has the M10 four-cylinder engine with Bosch K-Jetronic fuel injection, and a limited slip differential was available as an option.

=== 1977 ===
At the 1977 International Auto Show in Frankfurt, BMW unveiled its new variants of the E21, featuring the new BMW M20 six-cylinder engines (which were initially called "M60").

The four-cylinder 320 model was replaced with the 320/6, featuring a 2.0 litre version of the M20 engine. The new range-topping 323i model was introduced, featuring 2.3 L with 105 kW (141 hp), which gave the 323i a top speed of 200 km/h (124 mph). The braking system was also upgraded, with the 323i featuring disc brakes on all wheels. Options include power steering, a 5-speed close-ratio 'dogleg' sport gearbox, and 25% limited slip differential.

=== 1980 ===
For the 1980 model year, the four-cylinder models were upgraded: the 1.8 L carburetted M10 unit was revised to produce 66 kW (89 hp) and entered the market in the updated 316, while a fuel-injected version of the 1.8 L M10 was introduced in the 318i model (which replaced the carburetted 318 as the mid-range model). This fuel-injected 1.8 L M10 was also sold in Sweden with 320i badging (with a higher level of standard equipment to distinguish it from the 318i), because the 320/6 was never certified for sale there.

=== 1981 ===
The economy model 315 was introduced as a reaction to the second "oil crisis" in late 1979. More spartan than the other E21 models, it was the last E21 to be built and produced alongside the early E30 models.

== Baur TopCabriolet ==
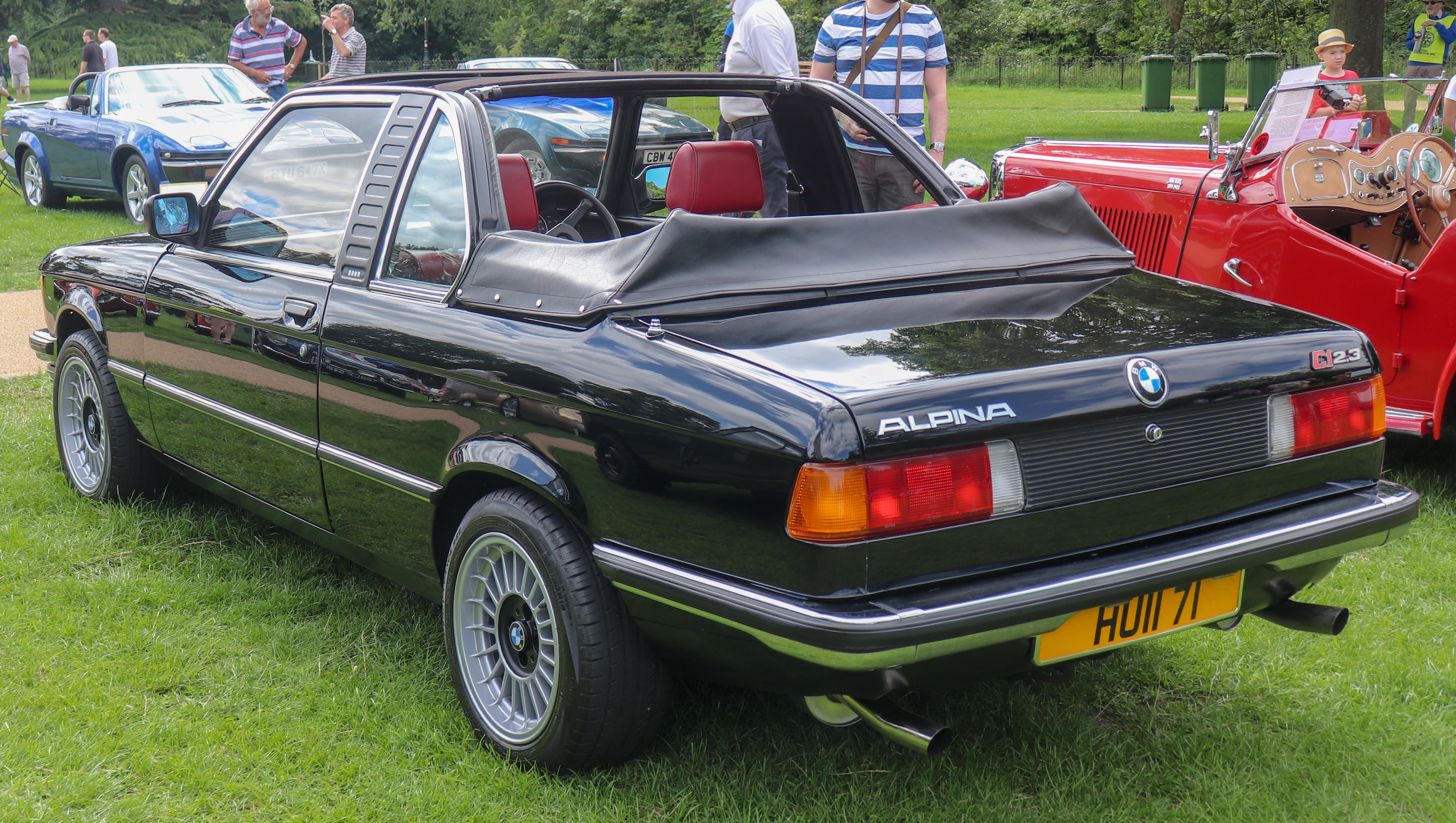
Alpina C1 Baur TopCabriolet

A cabriolet conversion was offered by Karosserie Baur, called the TopCabriolet. It consisted of a targa roof and an independent rear soft-top. The targa roof section was designed to fit in the trunk, while the boot cover doubled as a cover for the plastic rear window, protecting it from scratches and frost in winter. Production of the TopCabriolet began in 1978 and all engine options were available.

The cars were sold via the BMW dealership network and all Baur models included the BMW warranty. A total of 4,595 TopCabriolets were manufactured before production ended in 1981.

== North American models ==
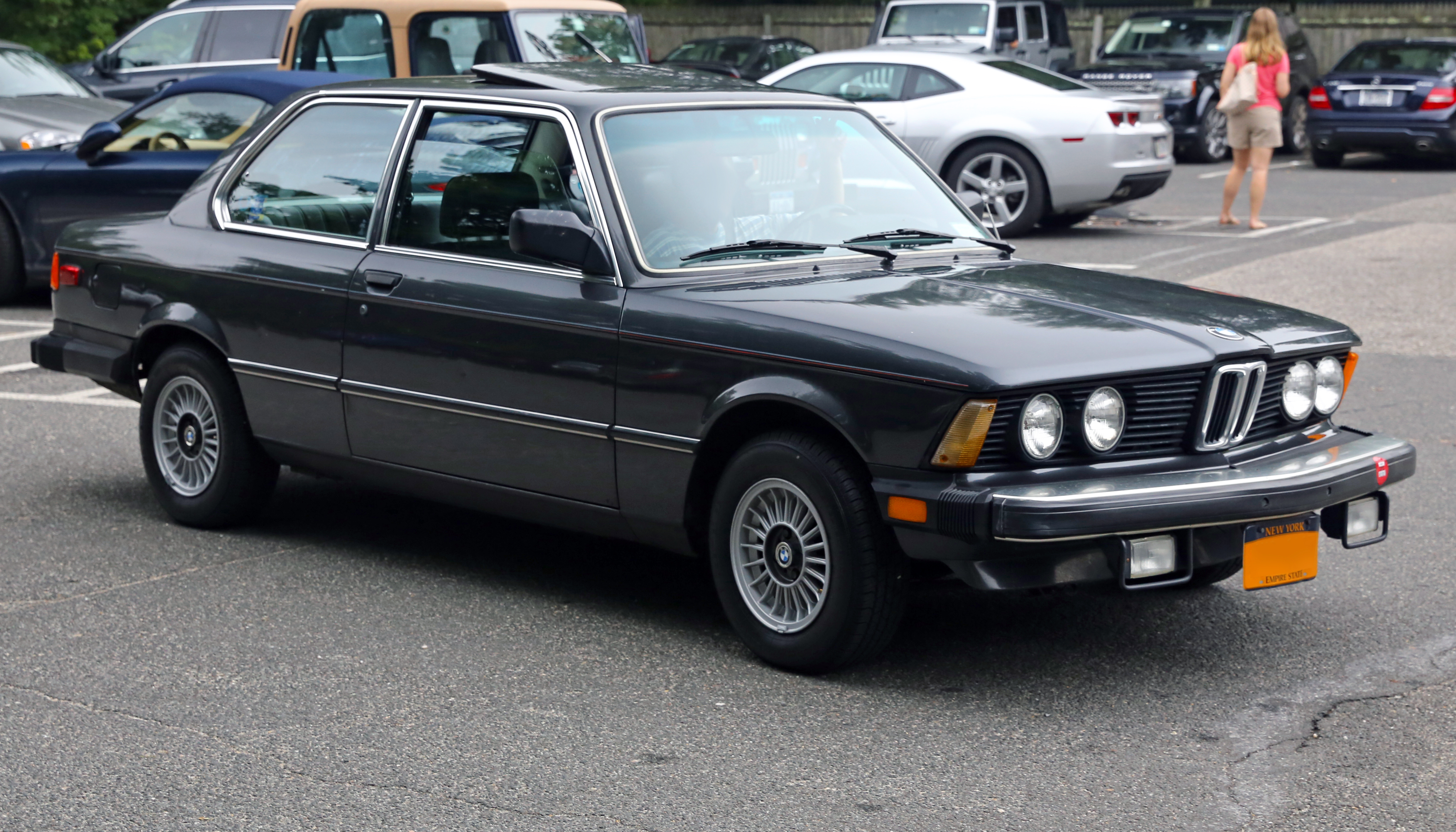
North American 320i (front)

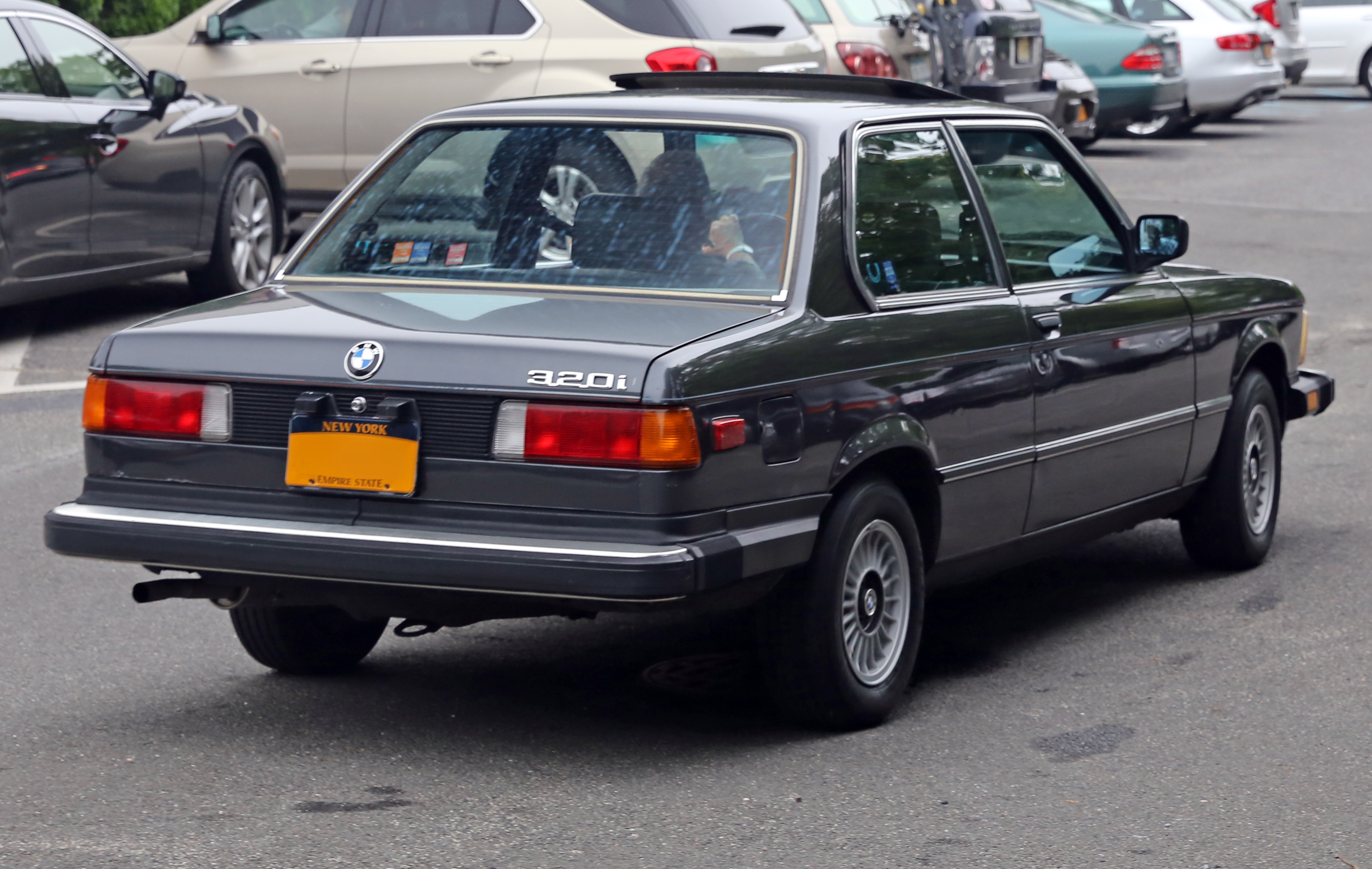
North American 320i (rear)

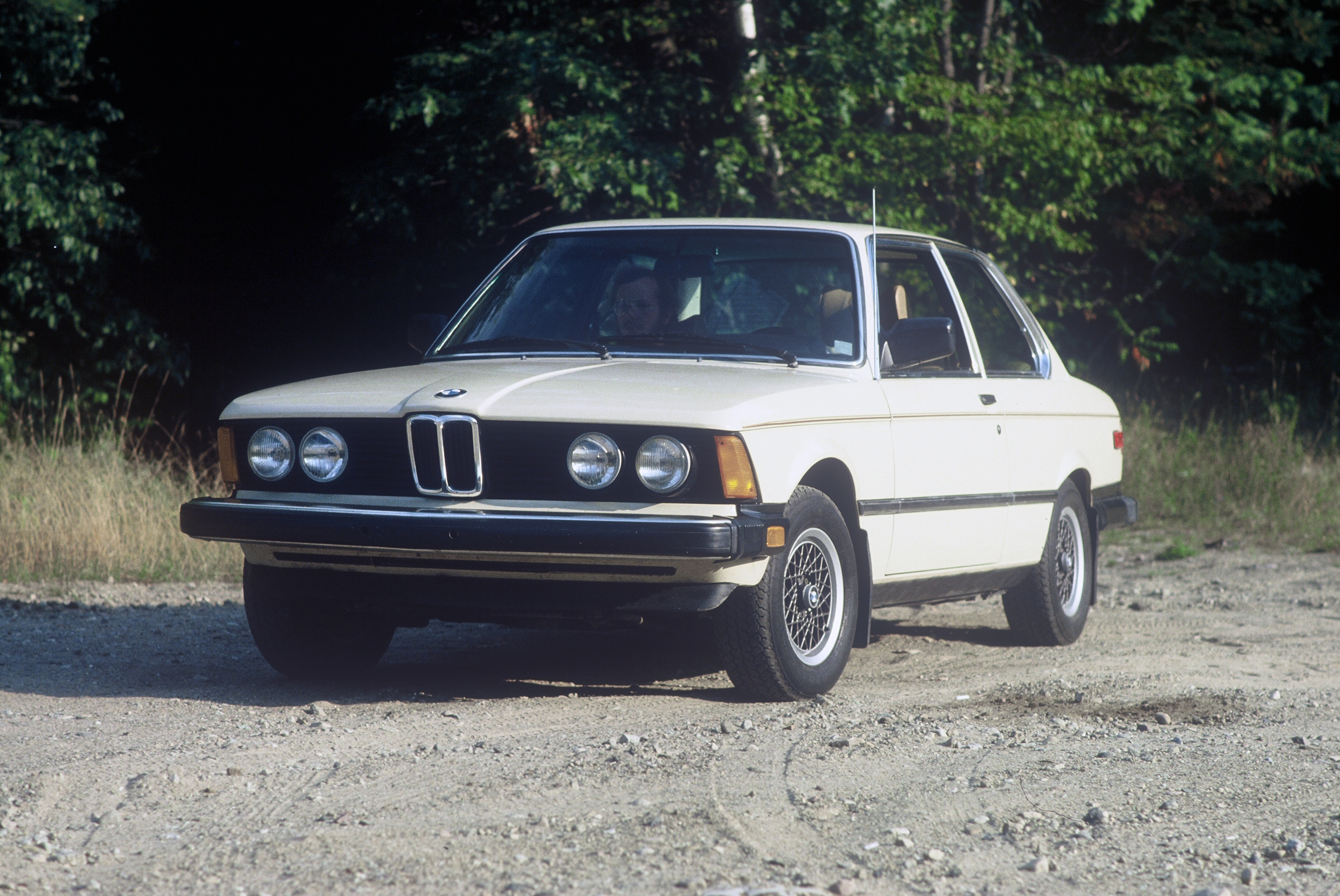
Canadian spec 320i (no AC)

The E21 was sold as the 320i in the United States from model years 1977 to 1983, first as a four-cylinder with a 2.0-liter engine, and from 1980 with a 1.8 liter version of the same. Six-cylinder models were not sold in America, because the E21 versions of the M20 engine did not meet U.S. emissions regulations at the time. The 320i models sold in the United States have a thermal reactor as a pollution control device. U.S. models came standard with air conditioning.

From 1977 to 1979, the U.S. models were powered by a 2.0 L (122 cu in) fuel-injected version of the M10 four-cylinder engine. In August 1979, from the 1980 model year, 320i was now powered by a downsized 1.8 L (110 cu in) version of the M10 four-cylinder engine. This resulted in a 100 km/h (62 mph) acceleration time of 11.1 seconds and a top speed of 169 km/h (105 mph).

Due to American regulations, the following changes were required:

- larger front and rear "diving board" bumper bars, which increased the car's overall length by 16 cm (6 in) to 4.5 m (177 in).
- sealed beam headlights, larger indicator lights and side reflectors
- speedometer in miles-per-hour
- fuel gauge markings changed from litres to "full, ½, reserve"
- a detuned version of the M10 engine, initially using a thermal reactor to control exhaust emissions
- in 1980, the engine was downsized from 2.0 L to 1.8 L and the thermal reactor was replaced with a catalytic converter.

The optional "S Package" (320iS) was introduced in 1981 and sacrificed the factory air conditioning, but offered Recaro sport seats, upgraded suspension in the form of a rear anti-roll bar and a stiffer front anti-roll bar, a 5-speed transmission and limited-slip differential, cross-spoke alloy wheels, a larger and more extensive tool kit, a dual operation manual sunroof, an AM/FM Blaupunkt radio with cassette player, fog lights, a 3-spoke leather-wrapped steering wheel and leather shift knob, a front air dam, a "delete" of the alphanumeric 320i markers on the rear trunk lid, a central-dash storage area where A/C controls were otherwise placed, and a limited color palette of white, silver or black. Just 2,500 320iS's were produced.

== Production ==
Production of the E21 began in June 1975 and finished in December 1983. Total production was 1,364,039 cars, of which 4,595 were in “Baur Top cabriolet” trim.

== Motorsports ==
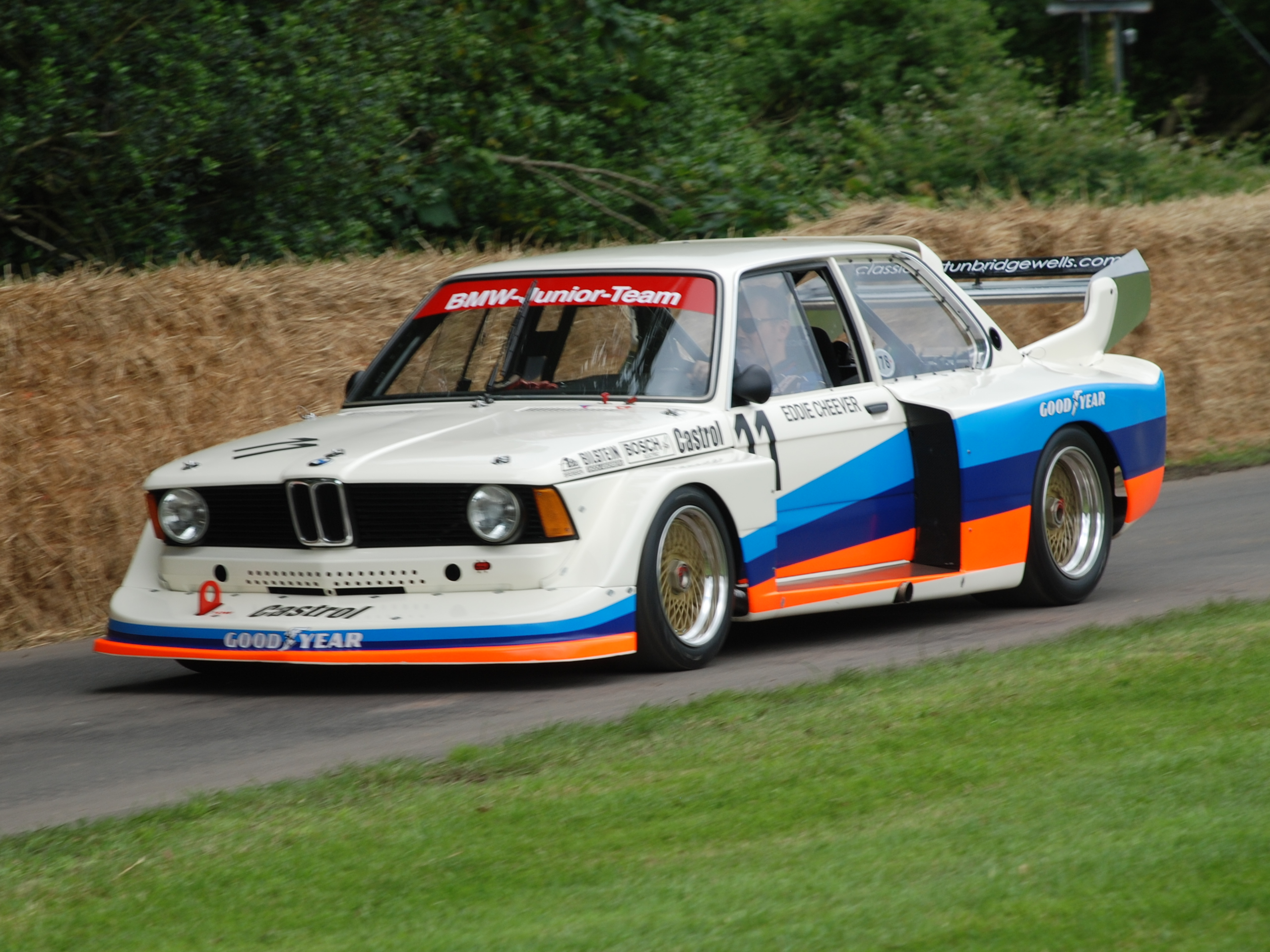
BMW 320 Group 5

The Group 5 version of the BMW 320 introduced in 1977 as a replacement to the BMW 3.0 CSL, nicknamed the Flying Brick in reference to the blocky bodyshape, was powered by a Formula Two engine that was tuned to 225 kW (302 bhp) by BMW Motorsport. The car was developed in only just over 12 weeks, without technical drawings. BMW Motorsport engineers simply carried out the modifications directly, with the car progressively taking its final shape.

The Group 5 320 was also used by the McLaren team in the American International Motor Sports Association series. It was also used by the BMW Junior Team, whose drivers included Manfred Winkelhock, Eddie Cheever, and Marc Surer. The 320 won its first race, at Zolder in 1977 with Marc Surer at the wheel. It also won the 1981 and 1982 Guia Race of Macau.
