= Paul Bracq =

Vehicle Designer

- Born: 13 December 1933 (age 92); Bordeaux, France
- Other name: Monsieur Mercédès
- Known for: Automobile design

Paul Bracq (born December 13, 1933, Bordeaux, France) is an automotive designer noted for his work at Mercedes-Benz, BMW, Citroën, and Peugeot.

== Career ==
Bracq's design career began in the studio of Philippe Charbonneaux, serving as his assistant in 1953 and 1954. During this period, the studio produced the designs for the French Presidential limousine built by Citroën, a one-off Pegaso coupe, and other automobiles.

Bracq served his mandatory military service from late 1954 through 1957. Subsequently, he worked for Daimler-Benz, heading its design studio in Sindelfingen, a post he held for ten years. Upon joining the Mercedes-Benz styling department he created the distinct coupé and cabriolet variants of already designed W111 and W112 “Fintail” sedans. He also styled the Mercedes 600, 230SL Pagoda roadster, the W108/W109, W114/W115 series and its stablemate: the W114 coupé – all of the '60s.

Upon his return to France in 1967, Bracq worked for Brissonneau and Lotz, where he worked on the design of the TGV high-speed passenger train led by Jacques Cooper. During this time, Bracq was also responsible for prototypes of a sports car based on the BMW 1600Ti and a coupé based on the Simca 1100.

In 1970, Bracq was appointed design director of BMW, where he succeeded Wilhelm Hofmeister. Bracq was responsible for the initial designs of the BMW E12 5 Series, BMW E21 3 series, E24 6 series and the E23 7 Series. His 1973 "Turbo" concept car won "Concept Car of the Year" by the Revue Automobile Suisse that year; The car repeated the feat in 1992 in the Bagatelle Concours d'Elegance.

Bracq began with Peugeot in 1974, going on to design personal transportation for the Pope and the interiors of the Peugeot 604 and the 505. He also worked on the 106, 205, 305 and 405 and runs a car restoration service (see external links)

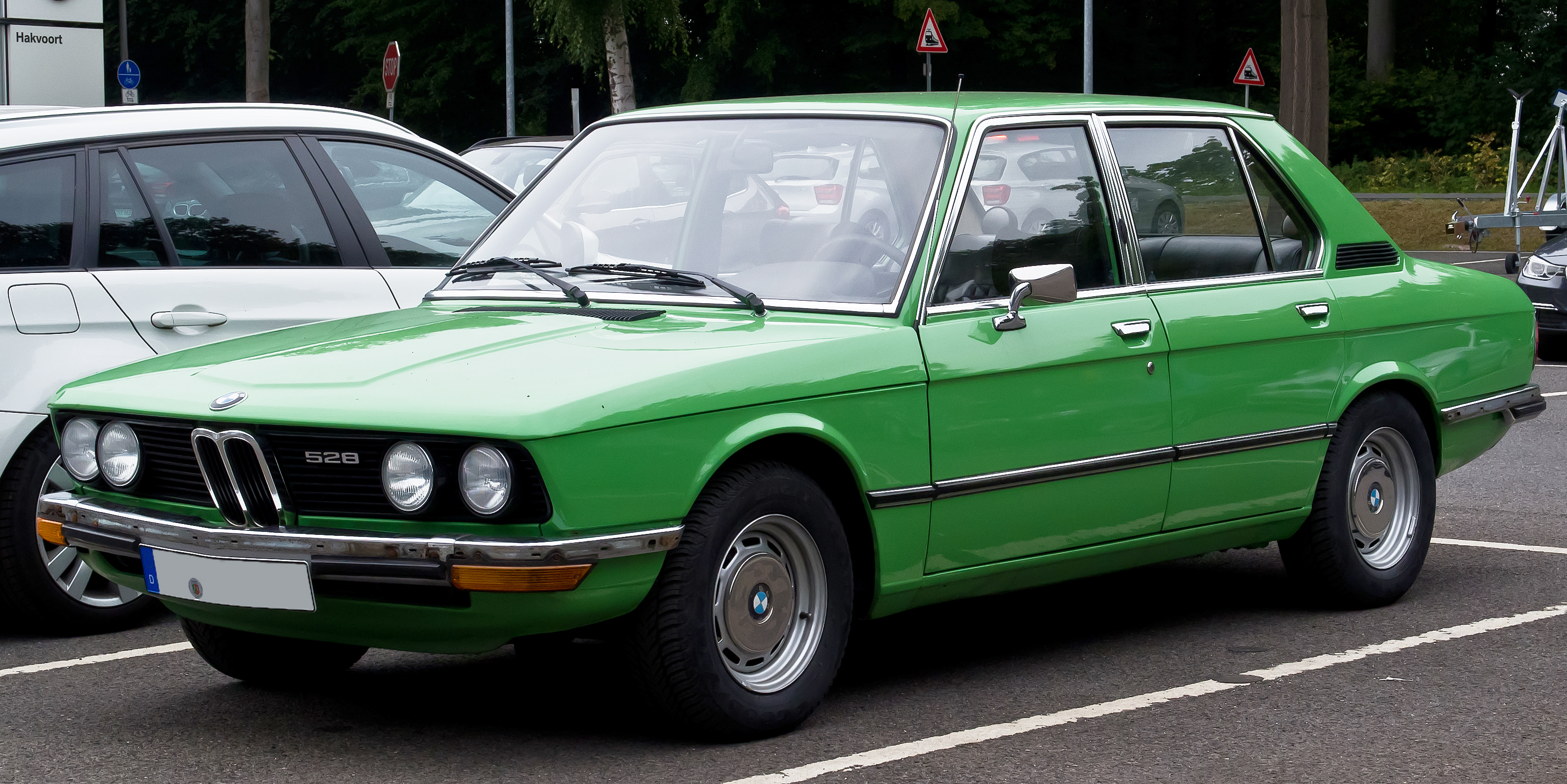
BMW 5 Series E12

Bracq is also active as a judge at many Concours d'Elegance, including the Pebble Beach Concours d'Elegance.

== Designs ==
Car designs that Bracq was involved in include:

- BMW E12
- BMW E21
- BMW E23
- BMW E24
- BMW E25
- Mercedes-Benz 600
- Mercedes-Benz W113
- Mercedes-Benz W112
- Mercedes-Benz W111
- Mercedes-Benz W108/W109
- Mercedes-Benz W114/W115
- Peugeot 604 (interior)
- Peugeot 505 (interior)
- Peugeot 205 (interior)
- Peugeot 305 (interior)
- Peugeot 405 (interior)
- Peugeot 106 (interior)
- Peugeot 206 (interior)
- Peugeot 406 (interior)

=== Gallery of car designs ===
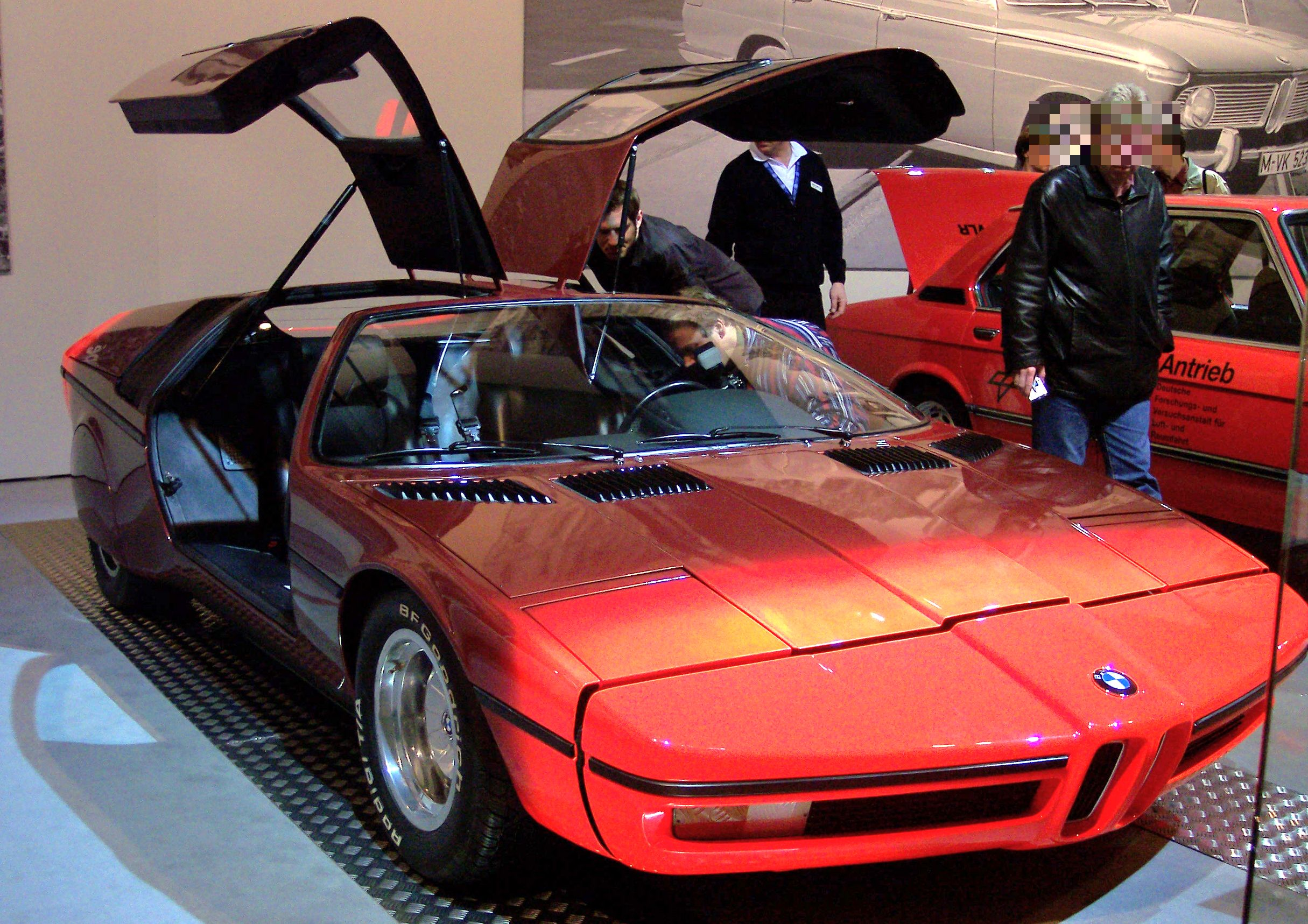
BMW Turbo

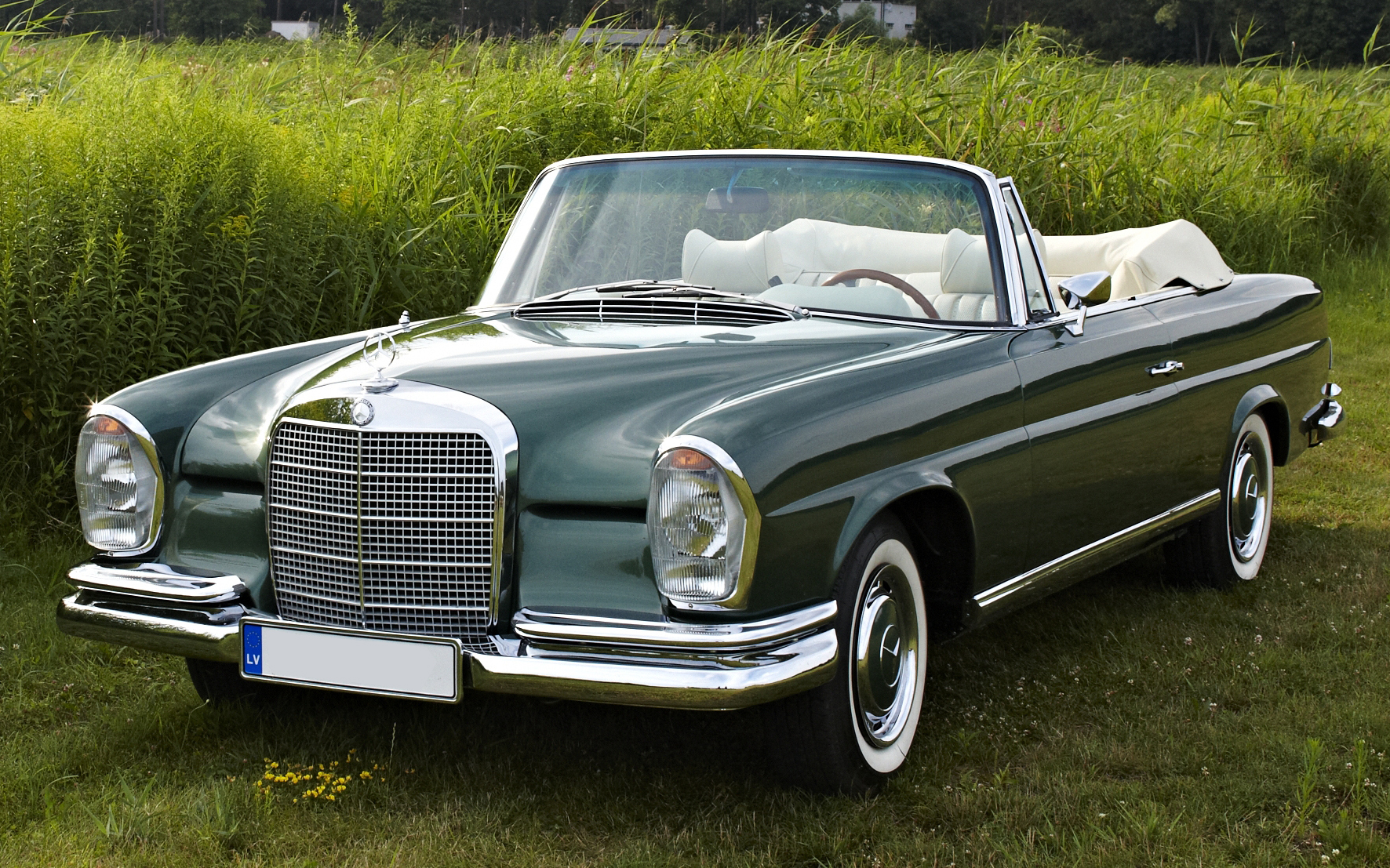
Mercedes-Benz W111 Cabriolet

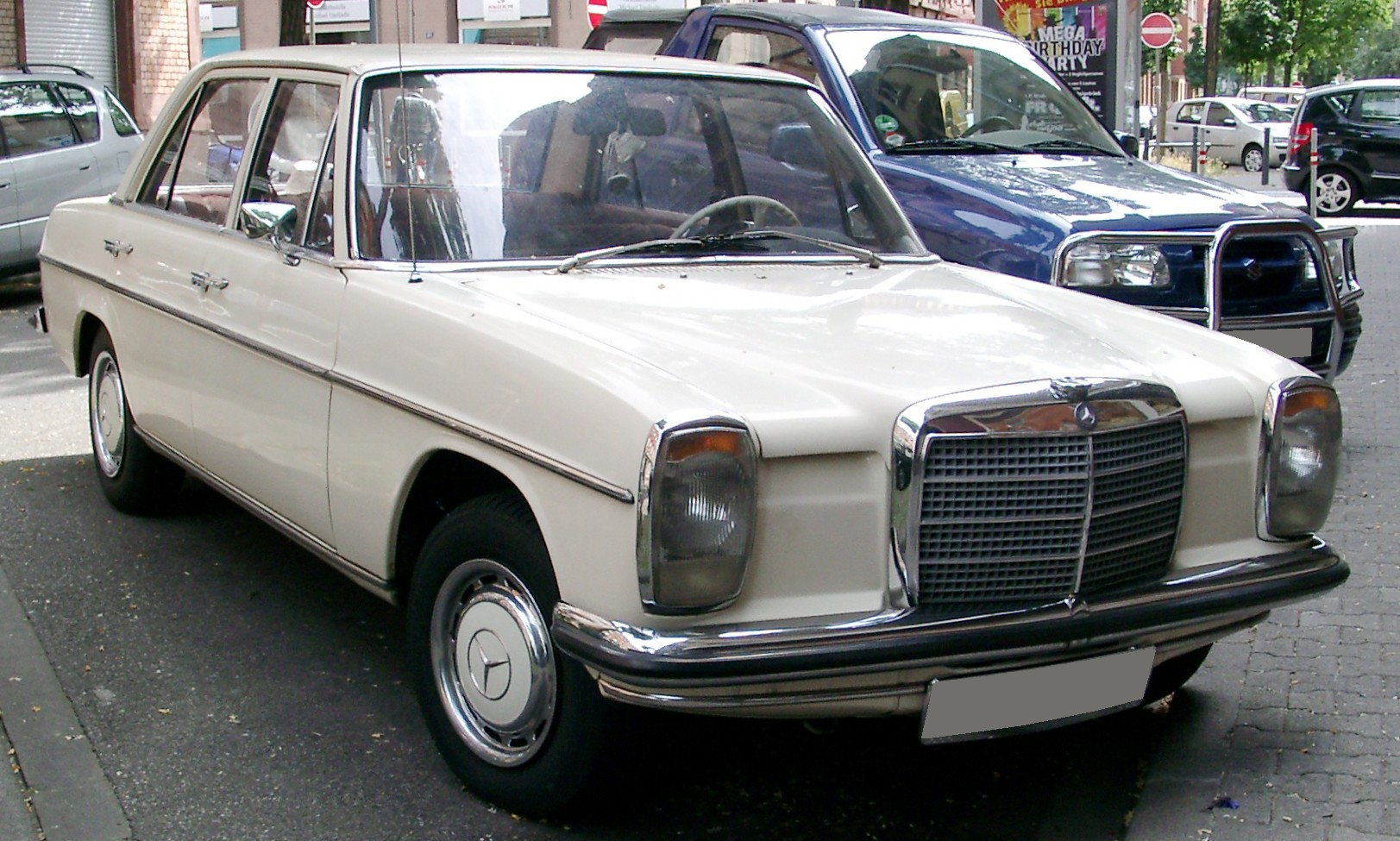
Mercedes-Benz W115
