= 1981 24 Hours of Daytona =

Endurance auto race

Previous: 1980	Next: 1982
Index: Races | Winners

The 19th Annual 24 Hour Pepsi Challenge Daytona was a 24-hour sports car and GT race held on January 31 – February 1, 1981 at the Daytona International Speedway road course. The race served as the opening round of the 1981 World Sportscar Championship and the 1981 IMSA GTX, GTO and GTU Championships. It was the last 24 Hours of Daytona to be part of the World Sportscar Championship. When the World Endurance Championship started in 2012 it would race in the United States at Sebring International Raceway and the Circuit of the Americas.

Victory overall and in the GTX class went to the No. 9 Garretson Racing Porsche 935 K3 driven by Bob Garretson, Bobby Rahal, and Brian Redman by the large margin of 13 laps over the similar No. 5 Porsche 935 K3 of the Bob Akin Motor Racing team driven by Bob Akin, Craig Siebert and Derek Bell Victory in the GTU Class and third outright was the No. 62 Kegel Enterprises Porsche 911 SC driven by Bill Koll, Jeff Kline and Rob McFarlin by 18 laps over the No. 23 Datsun 280ZX of Dick Davenport, Frank Carney and Rameau Johnson. Victory in the GTO class and sixth outright went to the No. 14 Bavarian Motors International BMW M1 driven by Walter Brun, Hans-Joachim Stuck and Alf Gebhardt by 23 laps over the No. 58 Porsche 911 Carrera RSR driven by Pete Smith, Chuck Kendall and Steven Earle.

== Race results ==
Class winners denoted in bold and with ‡.

Pos	Class	No.	Team / Entrant	Drivers	Car	Laps
Pos	Class	No.	Team / Entrant	Drivers	Engine	Laps
1	**GTX**	**9**	**(United States) Garretson Racing**	**(United States) Bob Garretson (United States) Bobby Rahal (United Kingdom) Brian Redman**	**Porsche 935 K3/80**	**708 ‡**
1	**GTX**	**9**	**(United States) Garretson Racing**	**(United States) Bob Garretson (United States) Bobby Rahal (United Kingdom) Brian Redman**	**Porsche 3.2 L Twin-turbo Flat-6**	**708 ‡**
2	GTX	5	(United States) Bob Akin Motor Racing	(United States) Bob Akin (United States) Craig Siebert (United Kingdom) Derek Bell	Porsche 935 K3	695
2	GTX	5	(United States) Bob Akin Motor Racing	(United States) Bob Akin (United States) Craig Siebert (United Kingdom) Derek Bell	Porsche 3.2 L Twin-turbo Flat-6	695
3	**GTU**	**62**	**(United States) Kegel Enterprises**	**(United States) Bill Koll (United States) Jeff Kline (United States) Rob McFarlin**	**Porsche 911 SC**	**644 ‡**
3	**GTU**	**62**	**(United States) Kegel Enterprises**	**(United States) Bill Koll (United States) Jeff Kline (United States) Rob McFarlin**	**Porsche 3.0 L Flat-6**	**644 ‡**
4	GTU	23	(United States) The New Raytown Datsun	(United States) Dick Davenport (United States) Frank Carney (United States) Rameau Johnson	Datsun 280ZX	626
4	GTU	23	(United States) The New Raytown Datsun	(United States) Dick Davenport (United States) Frank Carney (United States) Rameau Johnson	Nissan L28E 2.8 L I6	626
5	GTX	24	(Italy) Jolly Club Italia	(Italy) Emanuele Pirro (Italy) Martino Finotto (Italy) Carlo Facetti	Lancia Montecarlo Turbo	609
5	GTX	24	(Italy) Jolly Club Italia	(Italy) Emanuele Pirro (Italy) Martino Finotto (Italy) Carlo Facetti	Lancia Lampredi 1.4 L Turbo I4	609
6	**GTO**	**98**	**(West Germany) Bavarian Motors International**	**(Switzerland) Walter Brun (West Germany) Hans-Joachim Stuck (United States) Alf Gebhardt**	**BMW M1**	**608 ‡**
6	**GTO**	**98**	**(West Germany) Bavarian Motors International**	**(Switzerland) Walter Brun (West Germany) Hans-Joachim Stuck (United States) Alf Gebhardt**	**BMW M88 3.5 L I6**	**608 ‡**
7	GTU	98	(United States) Kent Racing	(United States) Lee Mueller (United States) Kathy Rude (Belgium) Philippe Martin	Mazda RX-7	606
7	GTU	98	(United States) Kent Racing	(United States) Lee Mueller (United States) Kathy Rude (Belgium) Philippe Martin	Mazda 1.3 L Rotary	606
8	GTX	84	(El Salvador) Scorpio Racing	(El Salvador) Enrique Molins (El Salvador) Eduardo Barrientos (El Salvador) Carlos Gonzalez	Porsche 935 M16	595
8	GTX	84	(El Salvador) Scorpio Racing	(El Salvador) Enrique Molins (El Salvador) Eduardo Barrientos (El Salvador) Carlos Gonzalez	Porsche 3.2 L Twin-turbo Flat-6	595
9	GTU	55	(United States) Mandeville Racing Enterprises	(United States) Roger Mandeville (United States) Amos Johnson (Puerto Rico) Diego Febles	Mazda RX-7	595
9	GTU	55	(United States) Mandeville Racing Enterprises	(United States) Roger Mandeville (United States) Amos Johnson (Puerto Rico) Diego Febles	Mazda 1.3 L Rotary	595
10	GTU	7	(United States) Kent Racing	(United States) Walt Bohren (United States) Jim Mullen (United States) J. Kurt Roehrig	Mazda RX-7	589
10	GTU	7	(United States) Kent Racing	(United States) Walt Bohren (United States) Jim Mullen (United States) J. Kurt Roehrig	Mazda 1.3 L Rotary	589
11	GTU	50	(United States) Downing/Maffucci Racing	(United States) Scott Hoerr (United States) Irv Hoerr (United States) Jim Downing	Mazda RX-7	585
11	GTU	50	(United States) Downing/Maffucci Racing	(United States) Scott Hoerr (United States) Irv Hoerr (United States) Jim Downing	Mazda 1.3 L Rotary	585
12	GTO	58	(United States) Chuck Kendall	(United States) Pete Smith (United States) Chuck Kendall (United States) Steve Earle	Porsche 911 Carrera RSR	585
12	GTO	58	(United States) Chuck Kendall	(United States) Pete Smith (United States) Chuck Kendall (United States) Steve Earle	Porsche 3.0 L Flat-6	585
13	GTU	45	(United States) Autosport Technology	(United States) M. L. Speer (United States) Dwight Mitchell (United States) Ray Ratcliff	Porsche 914-6 GT	581
13	GTU	45	(United States) Autosport Technology	(United States) M. L. Speer (United States) Dwight Mitchell (United States) Ray Ratcliff	Porsche 2.0 L Flat-6	581
14	GTX	07	(Canada) Heimrath Racing	(Canada) Ludwig Heimrath (Canada) Ludwig Heimrath Jr.	Porsche 935	575
14	GTX	07	(Canada) Heimrath Racing	(Canada) Ludwig Heimrath (Canada) Ludwig Heimrath Jr.	Porsche 3.2 L Twin-turbo Flat-6	575
15	GTO	34	(United States) Drolsom Racing	(United States) George Drolsom (United States) Rob Hoskins (United States) Bill Johnson	Porsche 911 Carrera	563
15	GTO	34	(United States) Drolsom Racing	(United States) George Drolsom (United States) Rob Hoskins (United States) Bill Johnson	Porsche 3.0 L Flat-6	563
16	GTX	2	(United States) BMW Motorsport	(Austria) Dieter Quester (United Kingdom) David Hobbs (Switzerland) Marc Surer	BMW M1	555
16	GTX	2	(United States) BMW Motorsport	(Austria) Dieter Quester (United Kingdom) David Hobbs (Switzerland) Marc Surer	BMW M88 3.5 L I6	555
17	GTO	27	(United States) Southard Motor Racing	(United States) Steve Southard (United States) Jay Kjoller (United States) Jean Kjoller	Porsche 911 Carrera	548
17	GTO	27	(United States) Southard Motor Racing	(United States) Steve Southard (United States) Jay Kjoller (United States) Jean Kjoller	Porsche 3.0 L Flat-6	548
18	GTX	3	(Italy) Martini Lancia Racing	(Italy) Riccardo Patrese (West Germany) Hans Heyer (France) Henri Pescarolo	Lancia Montecarlo Turbo	545
18	GTX	3	(Italy) Martini Lancia Racing	(Italy) Riccardo Patrese (West Germany) Hans Heyer (France) Henri Pescarolo	Lancia Lampedri 1.4 L Turbo I4	545
19	GTO	42	(United States) Mac's Bar Spec./Kend Co.	(United States) Nort Northam (United States) Ed Kuhel (United States) Dick Neland	Chevrolet Camaro	532
19	GTO	42	(United States) Mac's Bar Spec./Kend Co.	(United States) Nort Northam (United States) Ed Kuhel (United States) Dick Neland	Chevrolet V8	532
20 DNF	GTO	04	(United States) T&R Racing	(United States) Tico Almeida (United States) Rene Rodriguez (Cuba) Miguel Morejon	Porsche 911 Carrera RSR	526
20 DNF	GTO	04	(United States) T&R Racing	(United States) Tico Almeida (United States) Rene Rodriguez (Cuba) Miguel Morejon	Porsche 3.0 L Flat-6	526
21	GTX	02	(United States) Firestone Tire & Rubber	(United States) John Morton (United States) Tom Klausler	Ford Mustang	517
21	GTX	02	(United States) Firestone Tire & Rubber	(United States) John Morton (United States) Tom Klausler	Cosworth BDA 1.6 L I4	517
22	GTO	36	(United States) Herman & Miller	(United States) Paul Miller (United States) Pat Bedard (United States) Skeeter McKitterick	Porsche 924 Carrera GTR	515
22	GTO	36	(United States) Herman & Miller	(United States) Paul Miller (United States) Pat Bedard (United States) Skeeter McKitterick	Audi EA831 2.0 L Turbo I4	515
23 DNF	GTU	82	(United States) Trinity Racing	(United States) Bob Bergstrom (United States) John Casey (United States) Jim Cook	Mazda RX-7	513
23 DNF	GTU	82	(United States) Trinity Racing	(United States) Bob Bergstrom (United States) John Casey (United States) Jim Cook	Mazda 1.3 L Rotary	513
24 DNF	GTX	51	(United States) Andial Racing/Meister Homes	(West Germany) Rolf Stommelen (West Germany) Harald Grohs (United States) Howard Meister	Porsche 935 M16	500
24 DNF	GTX	51	(United States) Andial Racing/Meister Homes	(West Germany) Rolf Stommelen (West Germany) Harald Grohs (United States) Howard Meister	Porsche 3.2 L Twin-turbo Flat-6	
25	GTU	16	(United States) Corp Racing Ltd.	(United States) Jim Burt (United States) Doug Grunnet (Canada) Steve Paquette	Mazda RX-7	471
25	GTU	16	(United States) Corp Racing Ltd.	(United States) Jim Burt (United States) Doug Grunnet (Canada) Steve Paquette	Mazda 1.3 L Rotary	471
26	GTU	52	(United States) Beach Ball Racing	(United States) Tom Cripe (United States) Dick Gauthier (United States) Jack Swanson	Porsche 911	450
26	GTU	52	(United States) Beach Ball Racing	(United States) Tom Cripe (United States) Dick Gauthier (United States) Jack Swanson	Porsche Flat-6	450
27	GTO	43	(United States) Bob Gregg Racing	(United States) Bob Young (United States) Len Jones (United States) Bob Gregg	Porsche 911 Carrera	446
27	GTO	43	(United States) Bob Gregg Racing	(United States) Bob Young (United States) Len Jones (United States) Bob Gregg	Porsche 3.0 L Flat-6	446
28	GTU	81	(United States) Trinity Racing	(United States) Tom Winters (United States) Steve Dietrich (United States) Carter Alsop	Mazda RX-7	429
28	GTU	81	(United States) Trinity Racing	(United States) Tom Winters (United States) Steve Dietrich (United States) Carter Alsop	Mazda 1.3 L Rotary	429
29	GTU	70	(United States) Chris Doyle	(United States) Chris Doyle (United States) Hubert G. Phipps (United States) Robert Overby	Mazda RX-7	429
29	GTU	70	(United States) Chris Doyle	(United States) Chris Doyle (United States) Hubert G. Phipps (United States) Robert Overby	Mazda 1.3 L Rotary	429
30	GTO	46	(Colombia) Pedro de Narváez	(Colombia) Honorato Espinosa (Colombia) Pedro de Narváez (Colombia) Jorge Cortes	Porsche 911 Carrera RSR	385
30	GTO	46	(Colombia) Pedro de Narváez	(Colombia) Honorato Espinosa (Colombia) Pedro de Narváez (Colombia) Jorge Cortes	Porsche 3.0 L Flat-6	385
31 DNF	GTX	65	(United States) Prancing Horse Farms Racing	(United States) Tony Adamowicz (United States) Rick Knoop	Ferrari 512 BB LM	373
31 DNF	GTX	65	(United States) Prancing Horse Farms Racing	(United States) Tony Adamowicz (United States) Rick Knoop	Ferrari Tipo F102B 4.9 L Flat-12	373
32 DNF	GTO	01	(United States) Kirby-Hitchcock Racing	(West Germany) Siegfried Brunn (United States) Robert Kirby (United States) John Hotchkis	Porsche 911 Carrera RSR	361
32 DNF	GTO	01	(United States) Kirby-Hitchcock Racing	(West Germany) Siegfried Brunn (United States) Robert Kirby (United States) John Hotchkis	Porsche 3.0 L Flat-6	361
33 DNF	GTO	25	(United States) Red Lobster Racing	(United States) Kenper Miller (United States) Dave Cowart (Colombia) Ricardo Londoño	BMW M1	346
33 DNF	GTO	25	(United States) Red Lobster Racing	(United States) Kenper Miller (United States) Dave Cowart (Colombia) Ricardo Londoño	BMW M88 3.5 L I6	346
34 DNF	GTX	30	(Italy) Momo/Penthouse	(Italy) Gianpiero Moretti (United States) Charles Mendez (Colombia) Mauricio de Narváez	Porsche 935 J	339
34 DNF	GTX	30	(Italy) Momo/Penthouse	(Italy) Gianpiero Moretti (United States) Charles Mendez (Colombia) Mauricio de Narváez	Porsche 3.2 L Twin-turbo Flat-6	339
35 DNF	GTU	57	(United States) Personalized Autohaus	(United States) Jeff Scott (United States) David Goodell (United States) Volker Bruckmann	Porsche 914-6 GT	339
35 DNF	GTU	57	(United States) Personalized Autohaus	(United States) Jeff Scott (United States) David Goodell (United States) Volker Bruckmann	Porsche 2.0 L Flat-6	339
36 DNF	GTO	71	(United States) Philip Keirn	(United States) Philip Keirn (United States) Gail Engle (United States) Bard Boand	Chevrolet Corvette C3	328
36 DNF	GTO	71	(United States) Philip Keirn	(United States) Philip Keirn (United States) Gail Engle (United States) Bard Boand	Chevrolet V8	328
37 DNF	GTO	67	(United States) Levi's Team Highball	(United States) Dennis Shaw (United States) Steve Whitman (United States) Les Blackburn	AMC Spirit AMX	303
37 DNF	GTO	67	(United States) Levi's Team Highball	(United States) Dennis Shaw (United States) Steve Whitman (United States) Les Blackburn	AMC 5.0 L V8	303
38 DNF	GTO	03	(Switzerland) Angelo Pallavicini	(Switzerland) Angelo Pallavicini (United Kingdom) John Sheldon (Australia) Neil Crang	Porsche 934	290
38 DNF	GTO	03	(Switzerland) Angelo Pallavicini	(Switzerland) Angelo Pallavicini (United Kingdom) John Sheldon (Australia) Neil Crang	Porsche 3.0 L Turbo Flat-6	290
39 DNF	GTX	0	(United States) Interscope Racing	(United States) Ted Field (United States) Milt Minter (United States) Danny Ongais	Porsche 935 K3/80	287
39 DNF	GTX	0	(United States) Interscope Racing	(United States) Ted Field (United States) Milt Minter (United States) Danny Ongais	Porsche 3.2 L Turbo Flat-6	287
40 DNF	GTO	11	(United States) Holbert Racing	(United States) Al Holbert (United States) Rick Mears (United States) Doc Bundy	Porsche 924 Carrera GTR	263
40 DNF	GTO	11	(United States) Holbert Racing	(United States) Al Holbert (United States) Rick Mears (United States) Doc Bundy	Audi EA831 2.0 L Turbo I4	263
41 DNF	GTX	4	(Italy) Martini Lancia Racing	(Italy) Michele Alboreto (Italy) Piercarlo Ghinzani (Italy) Beppe Gabbiani	Lancia Montecarlo Turbo	235
41 DNF	GTX	4	(Italy) Martini Lancia Racing	(Italy) Michele Alboreto (Italy) Piercarlo Ghinzani (Italy) Beppe Gabbiani	Lancia Lampedri 1.4 L Turbo I4	235
42 DNF	GTX	23	(United States) Bayside Disposal Racing	(United States) Hurley Haywood (West Germany) Jürgen Barth (United States) Bruce Leven	Porsche 935/80	232
42 DNF	GTX	23	(United States) Bayside Disposal Racing	(United States) Hurley Haywood (West Germany) Jürgen Barth (United States) Bruce Leven	Porsche 3.2 L Turbo Flat-6	232
43 DNF	GTO	78	(United States) Howey Farms	(United States) Clark Howey (United States) Tracy Wolf (United States) Dale Koch	Chevrolet Camaro	208
43 DNF	GTO	78	(United States) Howey Farms	(United States) Clark Howey (United States) Tracy Wolf (United States) Dale Koch	Chevrolet V8	208
44 DNF	GTO	19	(United States) Van Every Racing	(United States) Lance van Every (United States) Ash Tisdelle (United States) Rusty Bond	Porsche 911 Carrera RSR	194
44 DNF	GTO	19	(United States) Van Every Racing	(United States) Lance van Every (United States) Ash Tisdelle (United States) Rusty Bond	Porsche 3.0 L Flat-6	194
45 DNF	GTX	20	(United States) Chris Cord Racing	(United States) Chris Cord (United States) Jim Adams	Chevrolet Monza	191
45 DNF	GTX	20	(United States) Chris Cord Racing	(United States) Chris Cord (United States) Jim Adams	Chevrolet 6.0 L V8	191
46 DNF	GTX	80	(Canada) Maurice Carter Racing	(Canada) Maurice Carter (Canada) Eppie Wietzes (United States) R. J. Valentine	Chevrolet Camaro	188
46 DNF	GTX	80	(Canada) Maurice Carter Racing	(Canada) Maurice Carter (Canada) Eppie Wietzes (United States) R. J. Valentine	Chevrolet V8	188
47 DNF	GTU	38	(United States) Case Racing	(United States) Ron Case (United States) Dave Panaccione (United States) Ren Tilton	Porsche 911	169
47 DNF	GTU	38	(United States) Case Racing	(United States) Ron Case (United States) Dave Panaccione (United States) Ren Tilton	Porsche Flat-6	169
48 DNF	GTX	1	(West Germany) Kremer Racing	(United Kingdom) John Fitzpatrick (United States) Jim Busby (France) Bob Wollek	Porsche 935 K3/80	167
48 DNF	GTX	1	(West Germany) Kremer Racing	(United Kingdom) John Fitzpatrick (United States) Jim Busby (France) Bob Wollek	Porsche 3.2 L Turbo Flat-6	167
49 DNF	GTU	22	(United States) Personalized Autohaus	(United States) Wayne Baker (United States) Dan Gilliland (United States) Frank Harmstad	Porsche 914/4	143
49 DNF	GTU	22	(United States) Personalized Autohaus	(United States) Wayne Baker (United States) Dan Gilliland (United States) Frank Harmstad	Volkswagen 411E 1.6 L Flat-4	143
50 DNF	GTU	33	(United States) Zotz Garage	(United States) Harro Zitza (United States) Doug Zitza (United States) Ara Dube	Porsche 914-6 GT	128
50 DNF	GTU	33	(United States) Zotz Garage	(United States) Harro Zitza (United States) Doug Zitza (United States) Ara Dube	Porsche 2.0 L Flat-6	128
51 DNF	GTO	17	(United States) Bavarian Motors International	(West Germany) Bruno Beilcke (West Germany) Kurt König (West Germany) Rudi Walch	BMW 3.5 CSL	126
51 DNF	GTO	17	(United States) Bavarian Motors International	(West Germany) Bruno Beilcke (West Germany) Kurt König (West Germany) Rudi Walch	BMW M30B35 3.5 L I6	126
52 DNF	GTX	37	(United States) Pepe Romero	(United States) Pepe Romero (Puerto Rico) Mandy Gonzalez (Dominican Republic) Luis Méndez	Porsche 935 M16	121
52 DNF	GTX	37	(United States) Pepe Romero	(United States) Pepe Romero (Puerto Rico) Mandy Gonzalez (Dominican Republic) Luis Méndez	Porsche 3.2 L Turbo Flat-6	121
53 DNF	GTO	40	(Canada) David Deacon Racing	(Canada) Rudy Bartling (Canada) Mike Freberg (Canada) David Deacon	BMW M1	118
53 DNF	GTO	40	(Canada) David Deacon Racing	(Canada) Rudy Bartling (Canada) Mike Freberg (Canada) David Deacon	BMW M88 3.5 L I6	118
54 DNF	GTO	54	(United States) Montura Racing	(United States) Tony Garcia (United States) Albert Naon (United States) Luis Sereix	Porsche 911 Carrera RSR	112
54 DNF	GTO	54	(United States) Montura Racing	(United States) Tony Garcia (United States) Albert Naon (United States) Luis Sereix	Porsche 3.0 L Flat-6	112
55 DNF	GTO	99	(United States) Gassaway/Oftedahl	(United States) Dave Heinz (United States) Chris Gleason (United States) Joe Cogbill (United States) Mike Gassaway	Chevrolet Camaro	108
55 DNF	GTO	99	(United States) Gassaway/Oftedahl	(United States) Dave Heinz (United States) Chris Gleason (United States) Joe Cogbill (United States) Mike Gassaway	Chevrolet V8	108
56 DNF	GTO	60	(United States) Bob's Speed Products	(United States) Vicki Smith (United States) Sam Miller (United States) Bob Lee	AMC Spirit AMX	87
56 DNF	GTO	60	(United States) Bob's Speed Products	(United States) Vicki Smith (United States) Sam Miller (United States) Bob Lee	AMC 5.0 L V8	87
57 DNF	GTX	94	(United States) Whittington Brothers Racing	(United States) Don Whittington (United States) Bill Whittington (United States) Dale Whittington	Porsche 935 K3	84
57 DNF	GTX	94	(United States) Whittington Brothers Racing	(United States) Don Whittington (United States) Bill Whittington (United States) Dale Whittington	Porsche 3.2 L Turbo Flat-6	84
58 DNF	GTO	75	(United States) Z&W Enterprises	(Belgium) Eddy Joosen (Belgium) Dirk Vermeersch (Belgium) Jean-Paul Libert	Mazda RX-7	83
58 DNF	GTO	75	(United States) Z&W Enterprises	(Belgium) Eddy Joosen (Belgium) Dirk Vermeersch (Belgium) Jean-Paul Libert	Mazda 1.3 L Rotary	83
59 DNF	GTX	6	(West Germany) Joest Racing	(West Germany) Volkert Merl (West Germany) Jochen Mass (West Germany) Reinhold Jöst	Porsche 935 J	59
59 DNF	GTX	6	(West Germany) Joest Racing	(West Germany) Volkert Merl (West Germany) Jochen Mass (West Germany) Reinhold Jöst	Porsche 3.2 L Turbo Flat-6	59
60 DNF	GTX	18	(United States) JLP Racing	(United States) John Paul (United States) John Paul Jr. (United States) Gordon Smiley	Porsche 935 JLP	53
60 DNF	GTX	18	(United States) JLP Racing	(United States) John Paul (United States) John Paul Jr. (United States) Gordon Smiley	Porsche 3.2 L Turbo Flat-6	53
61 DNF	GTX	44	(United States) Stratagraph	(United States) Terry Labonte (United States) David Pearson (United States) Billy Hagan	Chevrolet Camaro	50
61 DNF	GTX	44	(United States) Stratagraph	(United States) Terry Labonte (United States) David Pearson (United States) Billy Hagan	Chevrolet V8	50
62 DNF	GTO	87	(United States) Bob Beasley	(United States) George Stone (United States) Bob Beasley (United States) Werner Frank	Porsche 911 Carrera RSR	48
62 DNF	GTO	87	(United States) Bob Beasley	(United States) George Stone (United States) Bob Beasley (United States) Werner Frank	Porsche 3.0 L Flat-6	48
63 DNF	GTO	15	(United States) D. L. Performance Engineering	(United States) Doug Lutz (United States) Robin Boone (United States) Dave White	Porsche 911 Carrera RSR	47
63 DNF	GTO	15	(United States) D. L. Performance Engineering	(United States) Doug Lutz (United States) Robin Boone (United States) Dave White	Porsche 3.0 L Flat-6	47
64 DNF	GTX	09	(United States) Thunderbird Swap Shops	(United States) Preston Henn (United States) Bob Bondurant (United States) Dale Whittington	Porsche 935 K3	30
64 DNF	GTX	09	(United States) Thunderbird Swap Shops	(United States) Preston Henn (United States) Bob Bondurant (United States) Dale Whittington	Porsche 3.2 L Turbo Flat-6	30
65 DNF	GTO	28	(United States) NTS Racing	(United States) Sam Posey (United States) Fred Stiff	Datsun 280ZX Turbo	29
65 DNF	GTO	28	(United States) NTS Racing	(United States) Sam Posey (United States) Fred Stiff	Nissan L28ET 2.8 L Turbo I6	29
66 DNF	GTU	66	(United States) Richard J. Dunham	(United States) Jack Dunham (United States) John Maffucci (United States) Stanton Barrett	Mazda RX-7	20
66 DNF	GTU	66	(United States) Richard J. Dunham	(United States) Jack Dunham (United States) John Maffucci (United States) Stanton Barrett	Mazda 1.3 L Rotary	20
67 DNF	GTU	49	(United States) Alfred Cosentino	(United States) Bob Speakman (United States) Al Cosentino	Mazda RX-7	12
67 DNF	GTU	49	(United States) Alfred Cosentino	(United States) Bob Speakman (United States) Al Cosentino	Mazda 1.3 L Rotary	12
68 DNF	GTO	06	(United States) Crevier Imports	(United States) Pete Halsmer (United States) Joe Crevier (United States) Al Unser Jr.	Ferrari 365 GTB/4	9
68 DNF	GTO	06	(United States) Crevier Imports	(United States) Pete Halsmer (United States) Joe Crevier (United States) Al Unser Jr.	Ferrari Tipo 251 4.4 L V12	9
69 DNF	GTX	10	(Italy) Jolly Club	(Italy) Carlo Facetti (Italy) Martino Finotto	Ferrari 308 GTB Turbo	4
69 DNF	GTX	10	(Italy) Jolly Club	(Italy) Carlo Facetti (Italy) Martino Finotto	Ferrari F106AB 2.9 L Turbo V8	4
DNS	GTX	00	(United States) Interscope Racing	(United States) Ted Field (United States) Milt Minter (United States) Danny Ongais	Porsche 935 K3/80	
DNS	GTX	00	(United States) Interscope Racing	(United States) Ted Field (United States) Milt Minter (United States) Danny Ongais	Porsche 3.2 L Turbo Flat-6	
DNS	GTO	88	(United States) Herb Adams VSE	(United States) Herb Adams (United States) Jerry Thompson (United States) Don Sherman	Chevrolet Camaro	
DNS	GTO	88	(United States) Herb Adams VSE	(United States) Herb Adams (United States) Jerry Thompson (United States) Don Sherman	Chevrolet V8	
DNS	GTO	05	(United States) T&R Racing	(United States) Tico Almeida (United States) Rene Rodriguez (United States) Fred Flaquer	Porsche 911 Carrera RSR	
DNS	GTO	05	(United States) T&R Racing	(United States) Tico Almeida (United States) Rene Rodriguez (United States) Fred Flaquer	Porsche 3.0 L Flat-6	
DNS	GTO	69	(United States) Southwind Enterprises	(United States) Tico Almeida (United States) Rene Rodriguez (United States) Fred Flaquer	Plymouth Volaré	
DNS	GTO	69	(United States) Southwind Enterprises	(United States) Tico Almeida (United States) Rene Rodriguez (United States) Fred Flaquer	Chrysler V8	
DNS	GTU	89	(United States) Klaus Bitterauf	(United States) Klaus Bitterauf (United States) James Moxley (United States) Jim Leo	Porsche 911 S	
DNS	GTU	89	(United States) Klaus Bitterauf	(United States) Klaus Bitterauf (United States) James Moxley (United States) Jim Leo	Porsche Flat-6	
DNQ	GTX	13	(United States) Kemp Motoracing	(United States) Charlie Kemp (United States) Art Pasmas (United States) Carson Baird	Ford Mustang II Cobra II	
DNQ	GTX	13	(United States) Kemp Motoracing	(United States) Charlie Kemp (United States) Art Pasmas (United States) Carson Baird	Ford Cleveland 5.8 L V8	
DNQ	GTX	73	(United States) Z&W Enterprises	(Belgium) Jean-Paul Libert (Belgium) Hervé Regout (Belgium) Jean Xhenceval	Mazda RX-7	
DNQ	GTX	73	(United States) Z&W Enterprises	(Belgium) Jean-Paul Libert (Belgium) Hervé Regout (Belgium) Jean Xhenceval	Mazda Rotary	
DNQ	GTX	74	(United States) Z&W Enterprises	(United States) Pierre Honegger (Belgium) Pierre Dieudonné (Venezuela) Ernesto Soto	Mazda RX-7	
DNQ	GTX	74	(United States) Z&W Enterprises	(United States) Pierre Honegger (Belgium) Pierre Dieudonné (Venezuela) Ernesto Soto	Mazda Rotary	
DNQ	GTO	97	(United States) The Cummings Marque	(United States) Don Cummings (United States) Bill McDill (United States) Guido Levetto	Shelby GT350	
DNQ	GTO	97	(United States) The Cummings Marque	(United States) Don Cummings (United States) Bill McDill (United States) Guido Levetto	Ford V8	

World Sportscar Championship
Previous race: none	1981 season	Next race: 12 Hours of Sebring

IMSA GT Championship
Previous race: none	1981 season	Next race: 12 Hours of Sebring
