= 1982 24 Hours of Daytona =

| Previous: 1981 | Next: 1983 |
Index: Races | Winners

The 20th Annual 24 Hour Pepsi Challenge was a 24-hour endurance sports car race held on January 30-January 31, 1982 at the Daytona International Speedway road course. The race served as the opening round of the 1982 IMSA GT Championship.

Victory overall and in the GTP class went to the No. 18 JLP Racing Porsche 935 driven by John Paul, John Paul Jr., and Rolf Stommelen. Victory in the GTO Class went to the No. 77 Mazda of North America Mazda RX-7 driven by Yoshimi Katayama, Takashi Yorino, and Yojiro Terada. Victory in the GTU class went to the No. 98 Kent Racing Mazda RX-7 driven by Kathy Rude, Lee Mueller, and Allan Moffat.

== Race results ==
Class winners in bold.

| Pos | Class | No | Team | Drivers | Car | Laps |
|---|---|---|---|---|---|---|
| 1 | **GTP** | **18** | (United States) **JLP Racing** | (United States) **John Paul** (United States) **John Paul Jr.** (Germany) **Rolf Stommelen** | **Porsche 935** | **719** |
| 2 | GTP | 5 | (United States) Bob Akin Motor Racing | (United States) Bob Akin (United States) Craig Siebert (United Kingdom) Derek Bell | Porsche 935 | 708 |
| 3 | GTP | 46 | (United States) Garretson Enterprises | (Colombia) Mauricio de Narváez (United States) Bob Garretson (United States) Jeff Wood | Porsche 935 | 683 |
| 4 | **GTO** | **77** | (United States) **Mazda of North America** | (Japan) **Yoshimi Katayama** (Japan) **Takashi Yorino** (Japan) **Yojiro Terada** | **Mazda RX-7** | **644** |
| 5 | GTO | 05 | (United States) T&R Racing | (Venezuela) Ernesto Soto (United States) Rene Rodriguez (United States) Tico Almeida | Porsche 911 Carrera RSR | 642 |
| 6 | **GTU** | **98** | (United States) **Kent Racing** | (United States) **Kathy Rude** (United States) **Lee Mueller** (Australia) **Allan Moffat** | **Mazda RX-7** | **640** |
| 7 | GTU | 92 | (United States) Kent Racing | (United States) Jim Mullen (United States) Walt Bohren (United States) Ron Grable | Mazda RX-7 | 632 |
| 8 | GTP | 26 | (United States) Auriga Racing | (United States) Tom Nehl (United States) Tommy Riggins (United States) Nelson Silcox | Chevrolet Camaro | 626 |
| 9 | GTO | 24 | (United States) 901 Shop | (United States) Jack Refenning (United States) Ren Tilton (United States) Rusty Bond | Porsche 934 | 618 |
| 10 | GTU | 38 | (United States) Mandeville Racing Enterprises | (United States) Roger Mandeville (United States) Amos Johnson (United States) Jeff Kline | Mazda RX-7 | 615 |
| 11 | GTO | 36 | (United States) Herman & Miller P&A | (United States) Paul Miller (United States) Pat Bedard (Germany) Jürgen Barth | Porsche 924 Carrera GTR | 608 |
| 12 | GTO | 37 | (United States) Kend Co. Enterprises | (United States) Dick Neland (United States) Ed Kuhel (United States) Nort Northam | Chevrolet Camaro | 602 |
| 13 | GTP | 86 | (United States) Bayside Disposal Racing | (United States) Hurley Haywood (United States) Bruce Leven (United States) Al Holbert | Porsche 935 | 598 |
| 14 | GTU | 63 | (United States) Downing/Atlanta Racing | (United States) Tom Waugh (United States) Jim Downing (United States) John Maffucci | Mazda RX-7 | 590 |
| 15 | GTU | 57 | (United States) Red Roof Inn | (United States) Doug Carmean (United States) John O'Steen (United States) Ed Primm | Mazda RX-7 | 584 |
| 16 | GTO | 35 | (United States) W-S Enterprises | (United States) M. L. Speer (United States) Ray Ratcliff (United States) Terry Wolters | Porsche 911 Carrera RSR | 583 |
| 17 | GTO | 01 | (United States) Marketing Corp. of America | (United States) John Morton (United States) Tom Klausler | Ford Mustang | 569 |
| 18 DNF | GTU | 66 | (United States) Dunham Trucking | (United States) Jack Dunham (United States) Scott Smith (United States) Scott Smith Jr. | Mazda RX-7 | 562 |
| 19 | GTO | 58 | (United States) Brumos Racing | (United States) Doc Bundy (United States) Jim Busby (Liechtenstein) Manfred Schurti | Porsche 924 Carrera GTR | 558 |
| 20 | GTO | 88 | (United States) Bob Beasley | (United States) Bob Beasley (United States) George Stone (United States) Jack Lewis | Porsche 911 Carrera RSR | 558 |
| 21 | GTP | 444 | (United States) Group 44 | (United States) Bob Tullius (Canada) Bill Adam (United States) Gordon Smiley | Jaguar XJS | 533 |
| 22 | GTO | 72 | (United States) Carrera Motorsports | (United States) Jean Kjoller (United States) Bob Nikel (United States) Grady Clay | Porsche 911 Carrera RSR | 529 |
| 23 DNF | GTP | 6 | (United States) N.A.R.T. | (France) Bob Wollek (Germany) Edgar Dören (United States) Randy Lanier | Ferrari 512 BB | 523 |
| 24 DNF | GTP | 9 | (United States) Garretson Enterprises | (United States) Bobby Rahal (United States) Bruce Canepa (United States) Jim Trueman | March 82G | 514 |
| 25 | GTU | 78 | (Germany) Der Klaus Haus | (United States) Scott Flanders (United States) Klaus Bitterauf (United States) Vicki Smith | Porsche 911 | 511 |
| 26 DNF | GTO | 54 | (United States) Montura Racing | (United States) Tony Garcia (United States) Albert Naon (United States) Rob McFarlin | BMW M1 | 475 |
| 27 | GTO | 50 | (Puerto Rico) Diego Febles Racing | (Puerto Rico) Diego Febles (Puerto Rico) Tato Ferrer (Puerto Rico) Chiqui Soldevilla | Porsche 911 Carrera RSR | 464 |
| 28 | GTO | 80 | (United States) Herb Adams | (United States) Roger Mears (United States) Leonard Emanuelson (United States) Herb Adams | Pontiac Firebird | 435 |
| 29 DNF | GTO | 84 | (El Salvador) Scorpio Racing | (El Salvador) "Jamsal" (El Salvador) Eduardo Barrientos (El Salvador) Eduardo Galdamez | Porsche 934 | 420 |
| 30 | GTO | 4 | (United States) Oftedahl Racing | (United States) Bob Raub (United States) Bob Leitzinger (United States) Art Pasmas | Pontiac Firebird | 420 |
| 31 DNF | GTP | 3 | (United States) Belcher Racing | (United States) Danny Sullivan (United States) Gary Belcher (United States) Hubert G. Phipps | Rondeau M382 | 408 |
| 32 DNF | GTP | 65 | (United States) Prancing Horse Farm Racing | (United States) Rick Knoop (United States) Carson Baird (United States) Tom Pumpelly | Ferrari 512 BB | 377 |
| 33 | GTP | 51 | (United States) Meldeau Tire World | (United States) Tom Juckette (United States) Mike Meldeau (United States) Bill McDill | Chevrolet Camaro | 351 |
| 34 DNF | GTP | 62 | (United States) Golden Eagle Racing | (United States) Bill Koll (United States) Irv Hoerr (United States) Skeeter McKitterick | Rondeau M382 | 338 |
| 35 | GTU | 30 | (United States) Case Racing | (United States) Russ Long (United States) Craig Case (United States) Ron Case | Porsche 911 | 332 |
| 36 DNF | GTO | 02 | (United States) Marketing Corp. of America | (United States) John Bauer (United States) Gary Pratt (United States) Milt Minter | Ford Mustang | 321 |
| 37 | GTO | 20 | (United States) AutoWest | (United States) Ron Hunter (United States) Richard Turner (United States) Duane Eitel | Mercury Capri | 304 |
| 38 DNF | GTP | 44 | (United States) Stratagraph | (United States) Billy Hagan (United States) Terry Labonte (United States) Gene Felton | Chevrolet Camaro | 295 |
| 39 | GTO | 29 | (United States) Oberdorfer Research | (United States) Dave Heinz (United States) Peter Kirill (United States) Hoyt Overbagh | Chevrolet Monza | 276 |
| 40 DNF | GTO | 21 | (United States) Crevier & Associates | (United States) Joe Crevier (United States) Fred Stiff (United States) Dennis Wilson | BMW M1 | 267 |
| 41 | GTU | 42 | (United States) Gary Wonzer | (United States) Gary Wonzer (United States) Bill Bean (United States) Chuck Grantham | Porsche 911 | 261 |
| 42 DNF | GTU | 23 | (United States) Raytown Datsun/D. Preston | (United States) Dick Davenport (United States) Frank Carney (United States) John McComb | Datsun 280ZX | 247 |
| 43 | GTO | 34 | (United States) Drolsom Racing | (United States) George Drolsom (United States) Bill Johnson (United States) Werner Frank | Porsche 924 Carrera GTR | 238 |
| 44 DNF | GTP | 10 | (United States) Oftedahl Racing | (United States) Carl Shafer (United States) Joe Mooney (United States) Tony Brassfield | Chevrolet Camaro | 231 |
| 45 DNF | GTP | 09 | (United States) Thunderbird Swap Shop | (United States) Preston Henn (South Africa) Desiré Wilson (United States) Marty Hinze | Porsche 935 | 229 |
| 46 DNF | GTO | 49 | (United States) Copeman Racing | (United States) Jerry Jolly (United States) Bob Copeman (United States) Tom Alan Marx | Porsche 911 Carrera RSR | 220 |
| 47 DNF | GTU | 83 | (United States) Zotz Garage | (United States) Harro Zitza (United States) John Belperche (United States) Doug Zitza | Porsche 914 | 213 |
| 48 DNF | GTU | 13 | (United States) Hallet Motor Racing Circuit | (United States) Anatoly Arutunoff (United States) Jose Marina | Lancia Stratos HF | 209 |
| 49 DNF | GTU | 27 | (United States) Scuderia Rosso | (United States) Jim Fowells (United States) Ray Mummery (United States) John Carusso | Mazda RX-7 | 168 |
| 50 DNF | GTO | 43 | (United States) Bob Gregg Racing | (United States) Bob Young (United States) Bob Gregg (United States) Ray McIntyre | Porsche 911 Carrera RSR | 161 |
| 51 DNF | GTP | 7 | (United States) Cooke Racing | (United States) Ralph Kent-Cooke (Canada) Eppie Wietzes (United States) Jim Adams | Lola T600 | 138 |
| 52 DNF | GTO | 67 | (United States) Levi's Team Highball | (United States) Les Delano (United States) Andy Petery (United Kingdom) Jeremy Nightingale | AMC Spirit AMX | 137 |
| 53 | GTP | 70 | (United States) Genesis Racing | (United States) Larry Chmura (United States) Jim Schofield (United States) Brent Regan | Chevron GTP | 119 |
| 54 DNF | GTU | 08 | (United States) Portia Parlor | (United States) Alan Howes (United States) Paul Nacthwey (United States) Oliver Jones | Porsche 911 SC | 103 |
| 55 DNF | GTO | 75 | (United States) Performance Plus Products | (United States) Dale Kreider (United States) Keith Swope (United States) Peter Knab | Chevrolet Corvette C3 | 101 |
| 56 DNF | GTO | 07 | (Canada) Heimrath Racing | (Canada) Ludwig Heimrath (Canada) Ludwig Heimrath Jr. | Porsche 924 Carrera GTR | 91 |
| 57 DNF | GTO | 60 | (United States) Bob's Speed Products | (United States) Guy Church (United States) Tom Alan Marx (United States) Bob Lee | AMC AMX | 91 |
| 58 DNF | GTO | 15 | (United States) D&L Performance | (United States) Dave Panaccione (United States) Chip Mead (Canada) John Graham | Porsche 911 Carrera RSR | 71 |
| 59 DNF | GTO | 73 | (United States) Wolf Engine | (United States) Clark Howey (United States) Dale Koch (United States) Tracy Wolf | Chevrolet Camaro | 70 |
| 60 DNF | GTP | 25 | (United States) Red Lobster Racing | (United States) Dave Cowart (United States) Kenper Miller (United States) Charles Mendez | March 82G | 68 |
| 61 DNF | GTP | 2 | (United Kingdom) John Fitzpatrick Racing | (United Kingdom) John Fitzpatrick (United Kingdom) David Hobbs (United States) Wayne Baker | Porsche 935 | 59 |
| 62 DNF | GTP | 0 | (United States) Interscope Racing | (United States) Ted Field (United States) Danny Ongais (United States) Bill Whittington | Porsche 935 | 55 |
| 63 DNF | GTO | 89 | (United States) Herb Adams | (United States) Gary English (United States) Jerry Thompson (United States) David Price | Chevrolet Camaro | 42 |
| 64 DNF | GTU | 87 | (United States) Ralph Sanchez Racing | (United States) Armando Ramirez (United States) Steve Cook (United States) Bill Cooper | Mazda RX-7 | 26 |
| 65 DNF | GTO | 79 | (United States) Promo Ltd./Whitheall Cap. | (United States) Bob Bergstrom (United States) Tom Winters (United States) Robert Overby | Porsche 924 Carrera GTR | 12 |
| 66 DNF | GTO | 41 | (United States) Starved Rock Ledge | (United States) Rusty Schmidt (United States) Scott Schmidt (United States) Kerry Hitt | Chevrolet Corvette | 9 |
| 67 DNF | GTU | 52 | (United States) Ours & Hours Racing | (United States) Jack Swanson (United States) Fred Snow (United States) Tom Cripe | Porsche 911 | 2 |
| 68 DNF | GTO | 11 | (United States) Kendall Racing | (United States) Dennis Aase (United States) Chuck Kendall (United States) John Hotchkis | BMW M1 | 1 |
| 69 DNF | GTP | 47 | (United States) Tide Racing | (Belgium) Bernard de Dryver (United States) Tom Davis | Ferrari 512 BB | 1 |
