= 1981 12 Hours of Sebring =

Sports car endurance race

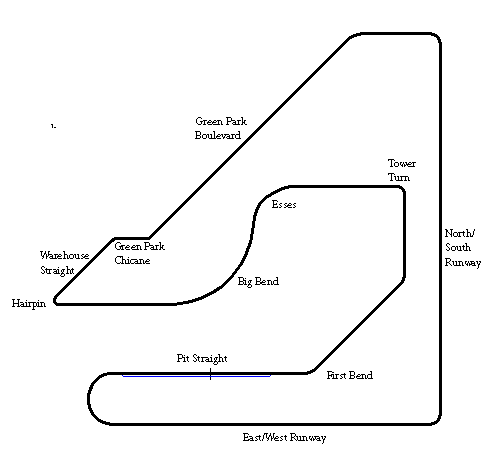
Sebring International Raceway in 1981

The Coca-Cola Twelve Hours of Sebring, International Grand Prix of Endurance, was the second round of the 1981 IMSA GT Championship and 1981 World Sportscar Championship. The race was held at the Sebring International Raceway, on March 21, 1981. Victory overall went to the Bayside Disposal Racing Porsche 935 driven by Hurley Haywood, Al Holbert, and Bruce Leven.

== Race results ==
Class winners in bold.

Pos	Class	No	Team	Drivers	Car	Laps
1	**GTX**	**86**	**(United States) Bayside Disposal Racing**	**(United States) Hurley Haywood (United States) Al Holbert (United States) Bruce Leven**	**Porsche 935**	**245**
2	GTX	90	(United States) Cooke Woods Racing / Garretson Enterprises	(United States) Roy Woods (United States) Ralph Kent-Cooke (United States) Skeeter McKitterick	Porsche 935 K3	242
3	GTX	2	(United States) Marty Hinze Racing	(United States) Marty Hinze (United States) Milt Minter (United States) Bill Whittington	Porsche 935 K3	240
4	GTX	3	(United States) Andial/Meister Racing	(United States) Howard Meister (Germany) Rolf Stommelen (Germany) Harald Grohs	Porsche 935	233
5	**GTO**	**58**	**(United States) Charles Kendall**	**(United States) Chuck Kendall (United States) Pete Smith (United States) Dennis Aase**	**Porsche 911 Carrera RSR**	**218**
6 DNF	GTX	30	(Italy) Momo/Penthouse	(Italy) Giampiero Moretti (United States) Charles Mendez (Colombia) Mauricio de Narváez	Porsche 935	213
7	GTO	23	(United States) Roe/Selby Racing	(United States) Tim Selby (United States) Earl Roe	Porsche 911 Carrera RSR	212
8	GTO	73	(United States) Z & W Enterprises	(United States) M. L. Speer (Belgium) Eddy Joosen (Belgium) Dick Vermeesch	Mazda RX-7	212
9	**GTU**	**98**	**(United States) Kent Racing**	**(United States) Lee Mueller (United States) Walt Bohren**	**Mazda RX-7**	**211**
10	GTO	44	(United States) Group 44	(United States) Bob Tullius (Canada) Bill Adam	Triumph TR8	208
11	GTU	67	Pennzoil of Puerto Rico	(Puerto Rico) Mike Ramirez (Puerto Rico) Luis Gordillo (Puerto Rico) Manuel Villa	Porsche 911	208
12	GTO	04	(United States) T & R Racing	(United States) Rene Rodriguez (United States) Tico Almeida (Colombia) Miguel Morejon	Porsche 911 Carrera RSR	203
13	GTO	54	(United States) Florida Crystals/Montura Racing	(United States) Albert Naon (United States) Tony Garcia (United States) Hiram Cruz	Porsche 911 Carrera RSR	203
14	GTO	35	(Puerto Rico) H.S.M. Racing	(Puerto Rico) Mandy Gonzalez (Puerto Rico) Bonky Fernandez (Venezuela) Juan Cochesa	Porsche 934	199
15	GTU	50	(United States) Downing/Maffucci Racing	(United States) Jim Downing (United States) Irv Hoerr (United States) Scott Hoerr	Mazda RX-7	196
16	GTU	49	(United States) Faza Squadra	(United States) Al Cosentino (United States) Bob Speakman	Mazda RX-7	190
17	GTX	9	(United States) Cooke Woods Racing/Garretson Enterprises	(United States) Bob Garretson (United States) Bobby Rahal (United Kingdom) Brian Redman	Porsche 935 K3	190
18 DNF	GTU	45	(United States) Autosport Technology	(United States) Dwight Mitchell (United States) Ray Ratcliff (United States) Bill Cooper	Porsche 914	189
19 DNF	GTO	28	(United States) NTS Racing	(United States) Sam Posey (United States) Fred Stiff	Datsun 280ZX Turbo	187
20	GTO	4	(United States) Group 44	(United States) John Kelly (United States) Pat Bedard	Triumph TR8	187
21 DNF	GTU	32	(United States) Alderman Datsun	(United States) George Alderman (United States) John McComb	Datsun 240Z	186
22	GTU	77	(United States) Bruce R. Jennings	(United States) Bruce Jennings (United States) Bill Bean (United States) Tom Ashby	Porsche 911	185
23	GTX	68	(United States) USA Racing	(United States) Richard Valentine (Canada) Maurice Carter	Chevrolet Corvette	182
24	GTO	05	(United States) Miguel Morejon	(United States) Fred Flaquer (United States) Joe Gonzalez (United States) Angelo Dominguez	Porsche 911 Carrera RSR	182
25	GTU	31	(United States) Hallet Motor Racing Circuit	(United States) Anatoly Arutnoff (United States) Jose Marina	Lancia Stratos HF	177
26	GTX	84	(El Salvador) Scorpio Racing	(El Salvador) "Jamsal" (El Salvador) Eduardo Barrientos (El Salvador) Guillermo Valiente	Porsche 935	177
27	GTO	25	(United States) Red Lobster Racing	(United States) Dave Cowart (United States) Kenper Miller	BMW M1	176
28	GTU	81	(United States) Trinity Racing	(United States) Steve Dietrich (United States) Tom Winters (United States) Hugh McDonough	Mazda RX-7	174
29	GTX	83	(United States) George R. Shafer	(United States) George Shafer (United States) Craig Shafer (United States) Al Crookston	Chevrolet Camaro	173
30	GTO	34	(United States) Drolsom Racing	(United States) George Drolsom (United States) Rob Hoskins (United States) Buzz Marcus	Porsche 924 Carrera GTR	165
31 DNF	GTU	92	(United States) Kent Racing	(United States) Kathy Rude (United Kingdom) Divina Galica	Mazda RX-7	160
32	GTO	15	(United States) D. L. Performance Engineering	(United States) Doug Lutz (United States) Dave Panaccione	Porsche 911 Carrera RSR	155
33	GTU	52	(United States) Ours & Hours Racing	(United States) Jack Swanson (United States) Tom Cripe (United States) Van McDonald	Porsche 911	154
34 DNF	GTO	43	(United States) Bob Gregg Racing	(United States) Bob Gregg (United States) Bob Young (United States) Joe Varde	Porsche 911 Carrera	153
35	GTU	88	(United States) Klaus Bitterauf	(United States) Klaus Bitterauf (United States) James Moxley (United States) Jim Leo	Porsche 911	150
36 DNF	GTX	41	(United States) Statagraph	(United States) Billy Hagan (United States) Terry Labonte	Chevrolet Camaro	144
37 DNF	GTO	24	(United States) Jack Refenning	(United States) Jack Refenning (United States) Ren Tilton (United States) Peter Welter	Porsche 934	139
38	GTU	39	(United States) The Foreign Exchange	(United States) John Higgins (United States) Chip Mead (United States) Bill Johnson	Porsche 911	136
39	GTU	66	(United States) Dunham Trucking	(United States) Jack Dunham (United States) Tom Sheehy (United States) Luis Sereix	Mazda RX-7	136
40	GTX	02	(United States) Firestone Tire & Rubber	(United States) John Morton (United States) Tom Klausler	Ford Mustang	133
41 DNF	GTX	1	(United Kingdom) John Fitzpatrick Racing	(United Kingdom) John Fitzpatrick (United States) Jim Busby	Porsche 935 K3	129
42	GTO	60	(United States) Bob's Speed Products	(United States) Bob Lee (United States) Vicki Smith (United States) Tom Alan Marx	AMC AMX	128
43 DNF	GTU	62	(United States) Kegel Enterprises	(United States) Bill Koll (United States) Jeff Kline	Porsche 911 SC	121
44 DNF	GTX	0	(United States) Interscope Racing	(United States) Ted Field (United States) Danny Ongais	Porsche 935 K3	117
45 DNF	GTO	53	(Canada) Fritz Hochreuter	(Canada) Fritz Hochreuter (Canada) Rainer Brezinka (Canada) Gary Hirsch	Porsche 911 Carrera RSR	114
46 DNF	GTX	27	(United States) Kenneth LaGrow / Jack Holley	(United States) Kenneth LaGrow (United States) Jack Turner	Chevrolet Camaro	114
47 DNF	GTU	7	(United States) Loud Car Racing	(United States) Jim Mullen (United States) Michael Zimicki	Mazda RX-7	112
48 DNF	GTX	09	(United States) T-Bird Swap Shop	(United States) Preston Henn (United States) John Gunn (United States) Gary Belcher	Porsche 935 K3	107
49 DNF	GTO	14	(United States) BMW Challenge Team	(United States) Alf Gebhardt (Switzerland) Marc Surer	BMW M1	106
50 DNF	GTU	57	(United States) Personalized Autohaus	(United States) Wayne Baker (United States) Robert Overby (United States) Dan Gilliland	Porsche 914	96
51 DNF	GTX	72	(United States) Vince Thompson	(United States) Del Russo Taylor (United States) Rex Ramsey	Chevron GTP	96
52 DNF	GTX	20	(United States) Chris Cord Racing	(United States) Chris Cord (United States) Jim Adams	Chevrolet Monza	94
53 DNF	GTX	97	(United States) The Cummings Marque	(United States) Don Cummings (United States) Tom Juckette	Chevrolet Monza	94
54 DNF	GTU	55	(United States) Mandeville Racing Ent.	(United States) Roger Mandeville (United States) Amos Johnson	Mazda RX-7	89
55 DNF	GTO	93	(United States) Sanyo/Russ Boy	(United States) John Carusso (United States) Russ Boy (United States) Rex Ramsey	Chevrolet Corvette	89
56 DNF	GTX	48	(United States) Meldeau Tire Stores	(United States) Bill McDill (United States) Robert Whitaker	Chevrolet Camaro	85
57 DNF	GTO	29	(United States) Bill Ferran	(United States) Nort Northam (Puerto Rico) Chiqui Soldevilla	Porsche 911 Carrera RSR	84
58 DNF	GTU	82	(United States) Trinity Racing	(United States) Jim Cook (United States) John Casey (United States) Bob Bergstrom	Mazda RX-7	74
59 DNF	GTO	12	(United States) Performance Marine Racing	(United States) Jimmy Tumbleston (United States) Bobby Dumont (United States) Ford Smith	Chevrolet Camaro	63
60 DNF	GTX	5	(United States) Bob Akin Motor Racing	(United States) Bob Akin (United Kingdom) Derek Bell (United States) Craig Siebert	Porsche 935 K3	62
61 DNF	GTU	75	(United States) Z & W Enterprises	(United States) Pierre Honegger (Belgium) Pierre Dieudonné (Belgium) Jean-Paul Libert	Mazda RX-7	60
62 DNF	GTX	07	(Canada) Heimrath Porsche	(Canada) Ludwig Heimrath Sr. (Canada) Ludwig Heimrath	Porsche 935	57
63 DNF	GTU	16	(United States) Corp Racing Ltd.	(United States) Doug Grunnet (United States) Jim Burt (Canada) Steve Paquette	Mazda RX-7	50
64 DNF	GTO	40	(Canada) David Deacon Racing	(Canada) David Deacon (Canada) Mike Freberg (Canada) Rudy Bartling	BMW M1	47
65 DNF	GTX	94	(United States) Whittington Bros	(United States) Don Whittington (United States) Bill Whittington (United States) Dale Whittington	Porsche 935 K3	43
66 DNF	GTX	8	(United States) JLP Racing	(United States) John Paul Sr. (United States) John Paul Jr.	Porsche 935	40
67 DNF	GTO	79	(United States) Van Every Racing	(United States) Lance Van Every (United Kingdom) Richard Bond (United States) Ash Tisdelle	Porsche 911 Carrera RSR	27
68 DNF	GTO	56	(United States) Rick Borlase	(United States) Rick Borlase (United States) Michael Hammond (United States) Don Kravig	Porsche 911 Carrera RSR	27
69 DNF	GTO	03	(Switzerland) Angelo Pallavicini	(Switzerland) Angelo Pallavicini (Australia) Neil Crang (United States) Dan Simpson	Porsche 934	23
70 DNF	GTO	89	(United States) Vette Brakes	(United States) Al Levenson (United States) Elizabeth Kleinschmidt (United States) Charles Kleinschmidt	Chevrolet Corvette	21
71 DNF	GTO	42	(United States) Cotrone Racing Enterprises	(United States) Joe Cotrone (United States) Kal Showket (United States) Phil Currin (United States) Emory Donaldson	Chevrolet Corvette	20
72 DNF	GTO	85	(United States) Sunrise Auto Parts	(United States) Jeff Loving (United States) Ralph Noseda (United States) Richard Small	Chevrolet Camaro	18
73 DNF	GTO	61	(United States) Sharkskin Racing	(United States) C. C. Canada (United States) Earle Moffitt (United States) Harry Cochran	Chevrolet Corvette	15
74 DNF	GTU	38	(United States) Case Racing	(United States) Ron Case (United States) Ray Mummery (United States) Jack Rynerson	Porsche 911	12
75 DNF	GTU	70	(United States) Doyle Racing	(United States) Chris Doyle (United States) Hubert Phipps	Mazda RX-7	10
76 DNF	GTU	21	(Canada) Alps Restoration	(Canada) Peter Aschenbrenner (Canada) Peter Moennick (Canada) Herman Lausberg	Porsche 914	6
77 DNF	GTO	13	(United States) Garcia Racing	(United States) John Lino (United States) George Garcia (United States) Fernando Garcia	Chevrolet Corvette	2
78 DNF	GTU	37	(United States) Vince Thompson	(United States) Janis Taylor (United States) Pat Godard (United States) Carol Cone	Alfa Romeo Alfetta	1
DNS	GTX	00	(United States) Interscope Racing	(United States) Danny Ongais (United States) Ted Field	Porsche 935 K3	0
DNS	GTX	18	(United States) JLP Racing	(United States) Werner Frank	Porsche 935	0
DNS	GTX	91	(United States) T-Bird Swap Shop	(United States) Preston Henn (United States) John Gunn (United States) Gary Belcher	Ferrari 512 BB	0
DNS	GTO	36	(United States) Herman + Miller P+A	(United States) Doc Bundy (United States) Paul Miller	Porsche 924 Carrera GTR	0
DNS	GTU	71	(United States) Morgan Performance Group	(United States) Charles Morgan (United States) Jim Miller (United States) Herb Forrest	Datsun 280ZX	0
DNS	GTO	10	(United States) T. C. Racing	(United States) Tim Chitwood (United States) Joe Varde	Chevrolet Camaro	0
DNS	GTU	01	(United States) T & R Racing	(United States) Fred Flaquer (United States) Joe Gonzalez (United States) Angelo Dominguez	Porsche 911 Carrera	0
DNS	GTO	46	(United States) BR Racing	(United States) Mark Leuzinger (United States) Mike van der Werff	De Tomaso Pantera	0
DNS	GTX	19	(United States) Chris Cord Racing	(United States) Chris Cord (United States) Jim Adams	Chevrolet Monza	0
DNS	GTX	22	(United States) Paul Canary Racing	(United States) John Gunn (United States) Paul Canary	McLaren M12 GT	0
DNS	GTO	65	(United States) Yenko Chevrolet	(United States) Gary English (United States) Don Yenko (United States) Bob McClure	Chevrolet Camaro	0
DNS	GTX	74	(United States) Z & W Enterprises	(United States) Pierre Honegger (Venezuela) Ernesto Soto	Mazda RX-7 GTP	0

=== Class Winners ===
Class	Winners	
GTX	Haywood / Holbert / Leven	Porsche 935
GTO	Kendall / Smith / Aase	Porsche Carrera RSR
GTU	Mueller / Bohren	Mazda RX-7
