= 1982 12 Hours of Sebring =

Sports car endurance race

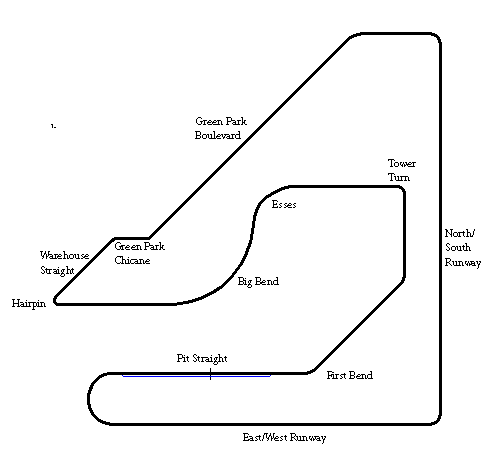
Sebring International Raceway in 1982

The 30th Anniversary Coca-Cola Twelve Hours of Sebring Camel GT, was the second round of the 1982 IMSA GT Championship and was held at the Sebring International Raceway, on March 20, 1982. Victory overall went to the No. 18 JLP Racing Porsche 935 driven by John Paul Sr. and John Paul Jr.

== Race results ==
Class winners in bold.

Pos	Class	No.	Team	Drivers	Car	Laps
1	**GTP**	**18**	**(United States) JLP Racing**	**(United States) John Paul Sr. (United States) John Paul Jr.**	**Porsche 935**	**244**
2	GTP	46	(United States) Garretson Development	(United States) Bobby Rahal (Colombia) Mauricio de Narváez (United States) Jim Trueman	March 82G	244
3	GTP	8	(United States) JLP Racing	(United States) M. L. Speer (United States) Terry Wolters (United States) Charles Mendez	Porsche 935	237
4	**GTO**	**50**	**(Puerto Rico) Diego Febles Racing**	**(Puerto Rico) Diego Febles (Puerto Rico) Tato Ferrer (Puerto Rico) Chiqui Soldevilla**	**Porsche 911 Carrera RSR**	**235**
5	GTP	86	(United States) Bayside Disposal Racing	(United States) Hurley Haywood (United States) Al Holbert (United States) Bruce Leven	Porsche 935	231
6	**GTU**	**38**	**(United States) Mandeville Racing Ent.**	**(United States) Roger Mandeville (United States) Jeff Kline (United States) Amos Johnson**	**Mazda RX-7**	**224**
7	GTP	9	(United States) Garretson Development	(United States) Ray Ratcliff (United States) Grady Clay (United States) Skeeter McKitterick	Porsche 935	224
8	GTO	39	(Canada) R&H Racing	(Canada) Rainer Brezinka (Canada) Rudy Bartling (Canada) Fritz Hochreuter	Porsche 911 Carrera RSR	221
9	GTO	01	(United States) Marketing Corporation	(United States) John Morton (United States) Tom Klausler	Ford Mustang	219
10	GTO	05	(United States) T&R Racing	(United States) Tico Almeida (Venezuela) Ernesto Soto (United States) Rene Rodriguez	Porsche 911 Carrera RSR	218
11	GTO	26	(United States) Roe-Selby Racing	(United States) Earl Roe (United States) Tim Selby	Porsche 911 Carrera RSR	212
12	GTP	5	(United States) Bob Akin Motor Racing	(United Kingdom) Derek Bell (United States) Craig Siebert (United States) Bob Akin	Porsche 935	212
13	GTU	63	(United States) Jim Downing	(United States) Jim Downing (United States) Tom Waugh (United States) John Maffucci	Mazda RX-7	209
14	GTO	75	(United States) D&L Performance	(United States) Doug Lutz (United States) Dave Panaccione	Porsche 911 Carrera RSR	205
15	GTO	02	(United States) Marketing Corporation	(United States) Milt Minter (United States) John Bauer	Ford Mustang	194
16	GTU	27	(United States) Scuderia Rosso	(United States) Jim Fowells (United States) Ray Mummery (United States) John Carusso	Mazda RX-7	194
17	GTU	61	(United States) Paul Goral	(United States) Paul Goral (United States) Nort Northam (United States) Jim Burt	Porsche 911	189
18 DNF	GTP	00	(United States) Interscope Racing	(United States) Ted Field (United States) Danny Ongais	Porsche 935	187
19	GTO	21	(United States) Creviér & Associates	(United States) Joe Crevier (United States) Paul Fassler (United States) Bob Zeigel	BMW M1	187
20 DNF	GTP	7	(United States) Cooke Racing	(United States) Ralph Kent-Cooke (United States) Jim Adams (United Kingdom) David Hobbs	Lola T600	184
21	GTU	77	(United States) Dudley Davis	(United States) Dudley Davis (United States) Henry Godfredson (United States) Charlie Lloyd	Porsche 911	184
22	GTU	78	(United States) Der Klaus Haus	(United States) Vicki Smith (United States) Klaus Bitterauf (United States) Scott Flanders	Porsche 911	183
23	GTO	58	(United States) Brumos Racing	(United States) Jim Busby (United States) Doc Bundy (United States) James Brolin	Porsche 924 Carrera GTR	175
24	GTU	68	(United States) John Rynerson	(United States) John Rynerson (United States) Van McDonald (United States) Harvey McDonald	Porsche 911	168
25 DNF	GTU	42	(United States) Gary Wonzer	(United States) Gary Wonzer (United States) Bill Bean (United States) Chuck Grantham	Porsche 911S	164
26 DNF	GTP	6	(United States) North American Racing Team	(South Africa) Desiré Wilson (United States) Janet Guthrie (United States) Bonnie Henn	Ferrari 512 BB	163
27 DNF	GTP	16	(United States) T-Bird Swap Shop	(United States) Marty Hinze (United States) Bill Whittington (United States) Dave Whittington	Porsche 935 K3	151
28 DNF	GTP	09	(United States) T-Bird Swap Shop	(United States) Preston Henn (United States) Dale Whittington (United States) Randy Lanier	Porsche 935 K3	146
29	GTO	88	(United States) Shafer Concrete	(United States) George Shafer (United States) Craig Shafer (United States) Al Crookston	Chevrolet Camaro	144
30	GTU	07	(Canada) Road Runner Racing	(United States) Tom Buckley (Canada) Peter Aschenbrenner (United States) Gene Rutherford	Porsche 914-6 GT	142
31	GTP	97	(United States) The Cummings Marque	(United States) Don Cummings (United States) Irwin Ayes	Chevrolet Monza	141
32	GTO	94	(United States) Bard Boand	(United States) Bard Boand (United States) Richard Anderson (United States) Brian Utt	Chevrolet Corvette	138
33 DNF	GTO	4	(United States) Oftedahl Racing	(United States) Darin Brassfield (United States) Jerry Brassfield (United States) Bill Cooper	Pontiac Firebird	135
34	GTU	93	(Canada) Uli Bieri	(Canada) Uli Bieri (Switzerland) Jean-Pierre Zingg (Canada) Herman Lausberg	Porsche 911	127
35 DNF	GTU	66	(United States) Dunham Trucking	(United States) Jack Dunham (United States) Luis Sereix	Mazda RX-7	124
36 DNF	GTO	34	(United States) Drolsom Racing	(United States) George Drolsom (United States) Bill Johnson (United States) Tom Davey	Porsche 924 Carrera GTR	119
37 DNF	GTP	03	(Switzerland) Angelo Pallavicini	(Switzerland) Angelo Pallavicini (Australia) Neil Crang (United Kingdom) John Sheldon	Porsche 935	119
38 DNF	GTU	96	(United States) Bon Temps Racing	(United States) Ron Reed (United States) Mike Langlinais	Datsun 240Z	119
39 DNF	GTO	54	(United States) Montura Racing	(United States) Tony Garcia (United States) Albert Naon (United States) Fred Stiff	BMW M1	116
40	GTP	81	(United States) Meldeau Tire World	(United States) Bill McDill (United States) Mike Meldeau (United States) Tom Juckette	Chevrolet Camaro	104
41 DNF	GTU	51	(United States) Red Roof Inns	(United States) Ed Pimm (United States) Walt Bohren (United States) Doug Carmean	Mazda RX-7	103
42 DNF	GTP	20	(United States) Fuchs-Whitaker	(United States) Bruce Jernigan (United States) William Boyer	Chevrolet Camaro	90
43 DNF	GTO	84	(El Salvador) Scorpio Racing	(El Salvador) "Jamsal" (El Salvador) Eduardo Barrientos	Porsche 934	77
44 DNF	GTP	25	(United States) Red Lobster Racing	(United States) Dave Cowart (United States) Kenper Miller	March 82G	72
45 DNF	GTP	69	(United States) Kenneth LaGrow	(United States) Kenneth LaGrow (United States) William Boyer (United States) Jack Turner	Chevrolet Monza	68
46 DNF	GTO	44	(United States) Statagraph Inc.	(United States) Billy Hagan (United States) Gene Felton	Chevrolet Camaro	63
47 DNF	GTU	30	(United States) Case Racing	(United States) Ron Case (United States) Michael Harry (Italy) Angelo Pizzagelli	Porsche 911	62
48 DNF	GTP	65	(United States) Prancing Horse Farm Racing	(United States) Carson Baird (United States) Tom Pumpelly (United States) Chip Mead	Ferrari 512 BB	59
49 DNF	GTP	74	(United States) Mark Wagoner	(United States) Del Russo Taylor (United States) Wayne Dassinger	Chevron GTP	57
50 DNF	GTO	40	(Puerto Rico) Manuel Villa	(Puerto Rico) Luis Gordillo (Puerto Rico) Manuel Villa (Puerto Rico) Mandy Gonzalez	Porsche 911 Carrera RSR	56
51 DNF	GTO	79	(United States) ProMotion/Whitehall	(United States) Tom Winters (United States) Robert Overby (United States) Bob Bergstrom	Porsche 924 Carrera GTR	55
52 DNF	GTO	10	(United States) Oftedahl Racing	(United States) Bob Raub (United States) Tony Brassfield (United States) Carl Shafer	Pontiac Firebird	52
53 DNF	GTU	87	(United States) R. Sanchez Racing	(Dominican Republic) Luis Mendez (United States) Ralph Sanchez (United States) Armando Ramirez	Mazda RX-7	50
54 DNF	GTP	23	(United States) Superior Racing	(United States) Raul Garcia (United States) Armando Fernandez	Chevrolet Camaro	38
55 DNF	GTU	82	(United States) Trinity Racing	(United States) Jim Cook (United States) Jim Mullen	Mazda RX-7	36
56 DNF	GTU	15	(United States) Tim Lee	(United States) Timothy Lee (United States) Al White (United States) Craig Pearce	Mercury Capri	36
57 DNF	GTO	53	Fomfor Racing El Salvador	(El Salvador) "Fomfor" (El Salvador) Guillermo Valiente (El Salvador) Benjamin Gonzalez	BMW 3.0 CSL	27
58 DNF	GTP	48	(United States) Sanyo	(United States) Phil Currin (United States) John Carusso	Chevrolet Corvette	26
59 DNF	GTU	3	(United States) Ned Skiff	(United States) Ned Skiff (United States) Jim Leo	Renault 12	26
60 DNF	GTO	19	(United States) Van Every Racing	(United States) Ash Tisdelle (United States) Lance van Every	Porsche 911 Carrera RSR	23
61 DNF	GTO	36	(United States) Herman-Miller P. A.	(United States) Paul Miller (United States) Pat Bedard (Germany) Jürgen Barth	Porsche 924 Carrera GTR	23
62 DNF	GTP	45	(United States) Statagraph Inc.	(United States) Hershel McGriff (United States) Richard Brooks	Chevrolet Camaro	21
63 DNF	GTO	60	(United States) Bob's Speed Products	(United States) Bob Lee (United States) Brian Erikson (United States) Guy Church	AMC AMX	18
64 DNF	GTO	71	(United States) Sunrise Auto Parts	(United States) Jeff Loving (United States) Edward Belin	Chevrolet Camaro	14
65 DNF	GTP	2	(United Kingdom) John Fitzpatrick Racing	(United Kingdom) John Fitzpatrick (United Kingdom) David Hobbs	Porsche 935 K3	7
66 DNF	GTO	29	(United States) Oberdorfer Research	(United States) Hoyt Overbagh (United States) Peter Kirill (United States) Scott Smith Jr.	Oldsmobile Starfire	7
67 DNF	GTO	11	(United States) Kendall Racing	(United States) Dennis Aase (United States) Chuck Kendall (United States) John Hotchkis	BMW M1	1
DNS	GTP	0	(United States) Interscope Racing	(United States) Ted Field (United States) Danny Ongais	Porsche 935 K3	0
DNS	GTO	17	(United States) Tim Chitwood	(United States) Tim Chitwood (United States) Joe Varde	Chevrolet Camaro	0
DNS	GTU	31	(United States) Hallet Motor Racing Circuit	(United States) Anatoly Arutnoff (United States) Jose Marina	Lancia Stratos HF	0
DNS	GTO	22	(United States) Toyota Village Inc.	(United States) Werner Frank (United States) Ken Madren	Porsche 934	0
DNS	GTO	28	(United States) McVey Racing Enterprises	(United States) Bill McVey (Canada) David Deacon (United States) Scott Smith Jr.	Chevrolet Camaro	0
DNS	GTP	47	(United States) Frank Rubino	(United States) Frank Rubino (United States) Tom Davis	Ferrari 512 BB	0

=== Statistics ===
- Pole Position: 2:27.067 - Bobby Rahal (#46 March 82G-Chevrolet)
- Fastest Lap: 2:34.490 - John Fitzpatrick (#2 Porsche 935 K3/80)

=== Class Winners ===
Class	Winners	
GTP	Paul Sr. / Paul Jr.	Porsche 935
GTO	Febles/Ferrer/Soldevilla	Porsche 911 Carrera RSR
GTU	Mandeville / Kline / Johnson	Mazda RX-7
