= Maurice Carter =

Maurice Carter may refer to:

- Maurice Carter (basketball) (born 1976), American former professional basketball player
- Maurice Carter (developer) (1917–2011), New Zealand property developer, philanthropist, and Christchurch city councillor, 1956–1989
- Maurice Bonham-Carter (1880–1960), English Liberal politician, civil servant and cricketer
- Maurice Carter (production designer) (1913–2000), British film production designer
- Maurice Carter (racing driver) (1924–2002), Canadian racer
