= John Paul Sr. (racing driver) =

American racing driver

John Lee Paul Sr.
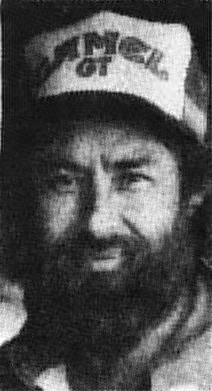
- Paul in 1983 or earlier
- Nationality: American
- Born: Johan Leendert Paul; March 12, 1939 Netherlands
- Championships: 1980 World Challenge for Endurance Drivers Champion; 1979 Trans-Am Cat.2 Champion
- Disappeared: May 2001 (aged 62); Fort Lauderdale, Florida

John Lee Paul (born Johan Leendert Paul, Dutch: [ˈjoːɦɑn ləˈʔɛndərt ˈpʌul], on March 12, 1939, disappeared in 2001) is or was an American fugitive, suspected double murderer, and former racing driver known as John Paul Sr. in the motorsport scene. In 1982 he and his son John Paul Jr. (1960–2020) won both U.S. classic endurance races, 24 Hours of Daytona and 12 Hours of Sebring. After his racing career he served a fifteen-year prison sentence for a variety of crimes including drug trafficking and shooting a federal witness. In 2001, he disappeared on his boat while being sought for questioning by officials regarding the disappearance of his ex-girlfriend. Paul's status is unknown.

== Early life ==
Paul emigrated to the United States from the Netherlands in 1956 with his family, settling in Muncie, Indiana, and legally changing his name to John Lee Paul. He attended Ball State University and then received a scholarship to Harvard University, where he received a master's degree in business. He became a successful mutual fund manager, and a millionaire. In 1960, his wife Joyce gave birth to a son, John Jr., who went on to become a successful driver on his father's team, but also served prison time for joining in some of his father's numerous criminal activities.

== Racing career ==
Paul started club-level sportscar road racing in the late 1960s, winning the Sports Car Club of America (SCCA) Northeast Regional Championship in 1968. When his wife and son left him in 1972, Paul left racing for a while, living on a sailboat he had purchased. He resumed racing in 1975 – now with his son, who had chosen to return to him, as a part-time member of his crew. He appeared at 1978 24 Hours of Le Mans for the Dick Barbour Racing team, taking a class win in IMSA GTX class – partnered by fellow American, Dick Barbour, and English driver, Brian Redman – in his first attempt at the French classic. This followed his class win in the 12 Hours of Sebring earlier that season.

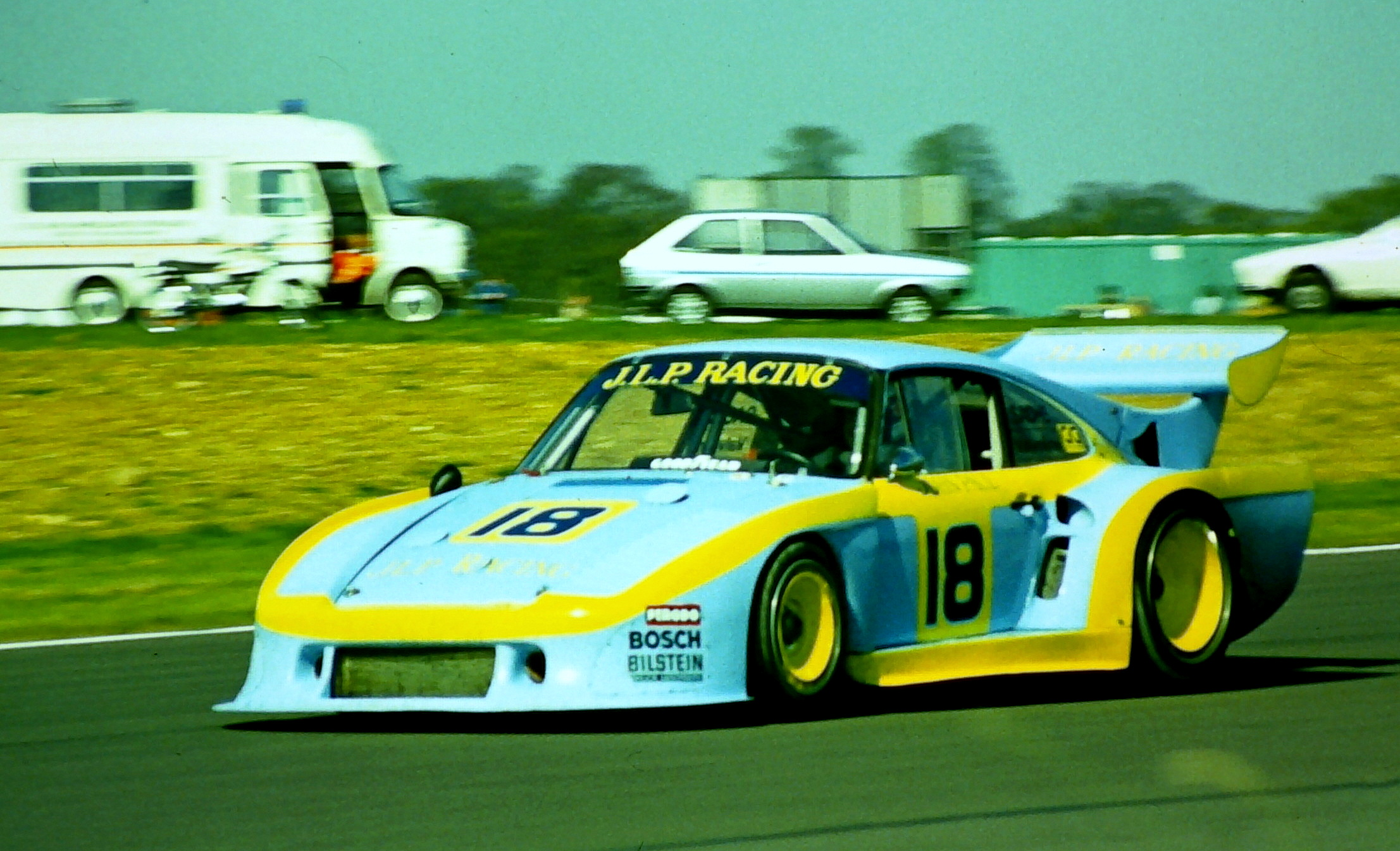
Porsche 935 from JLP Racing

In 1979, Paul won the Trans-Am Series race at Mosport by a margin of 33 seconds. He would win a total of six races, en route to winning the Trans-Am title. He had already won the World Challenge for Endurance Drivers title the season before. In 1980, Paul began teaming with his son, and on May 26 Paul remarried to Chalice Alford, holding the ceremony on the infield at Lime Rock Park. Later in the day he teamed with his son to win the day's race, the Coca-Cola 400, making them the first father-son duo to win an IMSA Camel GT race. It was the first IMSA GT race Paul Jr. had ever entered.

Father and son paired up again to win the Road America Pabst 500. Paul Sr. finished second in the IMSA GT series. In 1980 he won the World Challenge for Endurance Drivers by just four points over British driver John Fitzpatrick. He competed mainly in his specially modified Porsche 935s prepared by his own team, JLP Racing, operating out of Lawrenceville, Georgia.

In 1982, Paul Sr., teamed up with his son to win the 12 Hours of Sebring and, with third driver Rolf Stommelen, the 24 Hours of Daytona, running a race record (as of 2016) 2,760.960 mi (4,443.334 km). Together, the Pauls won three races. As a solo driver, Junior won another four, all in JLP Racing-prepared Porsche or Lola-Chevrolet T600. 1982 would be Paul Sr.'s last year as a driver. Lack of a major sponsor, even with the team's success, meant expenses overcame his earnings.

== Criminal activity ==
=== Drug possession ===
The Pauls had their first legal troubles when on January 10, 1979, Paul Jr. and Christopher Schill were caught by customs agents loading equipment onto a pickup truck on the bank of a canal in the Louisiana bayous after dark. Following questioning, when one of them smelled marijuana on their clothing, Paul Sr. was apprehended on his 42-foot boat named Lady Royale, where customs discovered marijuana residue and $10,000 on board. A rented truck was discovered nearby, which contained 1,565 pounds (710 kg) of marijuana. In court, all three pleaded guilty to marijuana possession charges, where each was placed on three years' probation and fined $32,500.

=== Disappearance and suspected murder of Chalice Paul ===
Chalice Alford Barnett, then 32, wed professional race car driver John Paul Sr. on May 26, 1980, at Lime Rock Park in Salisbury, Connecticut. She went to Palm Beach, Florida, at the end of 1980, leaving John behind in Roswell, Georgia, and the two split up within a year. She purportedly vanished in Key West, Florida, during the summer of 1981. Chalice Paul was cast to be in a Burt Reynolds film, Sharky's Machine, being filmed in Atlanta in the summer of 1981. John paid her a visit in Atlanta and persuaded her to accompany him on a quick second honeymoon to Key West, Florida, before her filming. She vanished sometime that summer of 1981 at 33 but John never bothered to contact her family about her disappearance.

John asserted that she left on her own accord. In 1982, when John could be reached in Atlanta by phone, he claimed that he had left Chalice in Key West. While John was still legally wed to Chalice, he married Jeanette Hope Ruben Haywood, the sister of racer Hurley Haywood. In Atlanta, she initially filed for divorce, then ten days later she withdrew it and re-filed for alimony. Chalice was last seen alive boarding a plane to go to Florida from Atlanta, Georgia, and she remains missing. Paul is considered a suspect in her disappearance.

=== Shooting of witness ===
On April 19, 1983, an individual named Stephen Carson was shot in the chest, abdomen and leg in Crescent Beach, Florida. Carson had been given immunity in a drug trafficking case. He testified that Paul Sr. had approached him, ordered him into the trunk of his car, and shot at him five times when he fled rather than comply. Paul then fled when a companion of Carson's began shouting. Paul was arrested, but while out on bail fled before his trial. Paul was apprehended by Swiss authorities in January 1985, served a six-month sentence in Switzerland for using a false passport, and was extradited back to the United States in March 1986. At the same time, Paul Jr. pleaded guilty to racketeering and received a five-year sentence. He had refused to testify against his father, who had been indicted as the ringleader of a drug trafficking ring that also included his father, Lee. On June 4, 1986, Paul Sr. pleaded guilty to attempted first-degree murder and received a sentence of twenty years, later expanded to twenty-five years after additional sentences were added.

=== Attempted escape ===
On March 10, 1987, Paul and another inmate unsuccessfully attempted to escape from prison by spraying a mixture of hot sauce and Pine Sol in a guard's face, then scaling a 12-foot fence. The guard recovered and fired two shots, scaring the inmates into surrendering. There was a stolen pickup truck in the parking lot that authorities suspect was for the two inmates. Paul served his sentence in USP Leavenworth. Paul was paroled on July 2, 1999.

=== Disappearance and suspected murder of Colleen Wood ===
Shortly following release from prison in 1999, Paul met an office manager named Colleen Wood. Wood moved to Fort Lauderdale, Florida from Ohio in the late 1990s. She was employed as an office manager at Lighthouse Point Marina. She would shortly leave her job, sell her condominium and move in with Paul on his 55-foot schooner to embark on a planned five-year around-the-world boating trip. He renamed the vessel The Diamond Girl (she was originally named The Island Girl) in early 2000.

Wood vanished sometime during the middle of December 2000. On December 3, she made a call to her son in Ohio, and informed him that she and Paul would be leaving soon for their trip. On December 13, Wood received an invitation to a holiday party from one of her friends. Wood, according to the acquaintance, said she was in Key West, Florida, when they spoke, and sounded in good spirits. Wood vanished shortly thereafter without a trace, and has not been heard from since. In April 2001, Wood's family informed Florida authorities that she was missing. Paul was interviewed by investigators in May 2001, but no charges were filed.

Paul claimed to have had a financial disagreement with Wood in the middle of December 2000. He said that after she got off the boat, she came back with two men to get rid of her possessions. Paul reportedly departed from the Fort Lauderdale area during the summer of 2001 on his boat and disappeared, likely in violation of his parole.

Authorities later found out that between December 2000 and February 2001, $38,000 had been taken out of Wood's bank account via ATMs in Fort Lauderdale. Surveillance photographs from the ATMs showed that at least two women, neither of them being Colleen, were using her credit cards. The two women who used Colleen's credit cards were found and identified by detectives; they said that the same man had led them to various ATMs and handed them Colleen's cards and PIN information.

The man was identified by the women as Paul; it is believed Paul used her computer to access the credit card data. In December 2000, Wood's credit card was used to make two ad purchases from a Florida publication. One of the advertisements was for a position as a first mate on a yacht, and the other was a personal ad from a man looking for a woman. Investigators discovered that the advertising was acquired in Wood's name. Authorities stated at that time that Paul was not a suspect in Wood's case, but that they would like to question him again regarding her disappearance.

== Personality ==
Paul Sr.'s "tantrums", his sociopathic and temperamental behaviour, made those in his vicinity fear for their safety. As one IMSA official put it, "Senior is the most terrifying man I have ever met. Temper tantrums and wild outbursts are pretty commonplace in racing, but Senior's extend way beyond that. He is more than frightening. He is scary." He once stormed into his racing offices and threw a full briefcase across the room like a Frisbee. "If it had hit a secretary, it would have taken her head off," reported a witness. "And I know he never looked before he threw. He could have killed someone."

Racing promoter Steve Earwood remembered an event between father and son at a Camel GT race in 1982. "The kid had just won the pole and we had him on a radio show and everyone was in a good mood... he couldn't have been happier," Earwood said. But, then "the old man showed up with his bride-to-be... (and) started screaming and yelling and chewed the kid up and down and sideways for something that had happened earlier. It was quite a scene and it rattled the hell out of the kid. He never did recover the rest of the night. He just looked beat." When asked if he was afraid of his father, Paul Jr. said, "My father can be very intimidating at times." John's son, John Paul Jr., died on December 29, 2020, at the age of sixty.

== Investigation ==
After receiving information that John was initially in Montego Bay, Jamaica, detectives tried to question him, but he disappeared. Shortly afterward, Paul Sr. was spotted by a passerby in the Fiji Islands who recognized him from an episode of Unsolved Mysteries. Detectives last received information regarding John's whereabouts in 2009, while he and his boat were in Thailand. He had plans to start a diving business off the Thai coast. Having sailed back to Europe, he allegedly sold his sailboat, Diamond Girl, in 2011, via a magazine classified advertisement in Italy. The FBI wish to question him about Wood's disappearance, although they have no new leads.

== Racing record ==
=== Career highlights ===
| Season | Series | Position | Team | Car |
|---|---|---|---|---|
| 1977 | IMSA Camel GT Challenge | 8th | John Paul | Porsche 911 Carrera RSR; Chevrolet Monza |
| 1978 | FIA World Challenge for Endurance Drivers | 1st | Jim Downing; JLP Racing | Mazda RX-2; Porsche 911 Carrera RSR |
| | IMSA Camel GT Challenge | 6th | JLP Racing | Porsche 911 Carrera RSR; Chevrolet Corvette |
| 1979 | Trans-Am Cat. 2 | 1st | JLP Racing | Porsche 935 JLP-1 |
| 1980 | FIA World Challenge for Endurance Drivers | 1st | Preston Henn; JLP Racing; Downing/Maffucci | Porsche 935 K3; Porsche 935 JLP2; Mazda RX-3 |
| 1981 | Camel GT Championship | 12th | JLP Racing | Porsche 935 JLP3; Lola-Cosworth T600 |
| | FIA World Endurance Championship of Drivers | 112th | JLP Racing | Porsche 935 JLP3 |
| 1982 | Camel GT Championship | 3rd | JLP Racing | Porsche 935 JLP3 |
| | Camel GTO Championship | 41st | | Pontiac Firebird |
| | FIA World Endurance Championship of Drivers | 103rd | N.A.R.T. | Ferrari 512BB LM |

=== Complete 24 Hours of Le Mans results ===
| Year | Class | No | Tyres | Car | Team | Co-Drivers | Laps | Pos. | Class Pos. |
|---|---|---|---|---|---|---|---|---|---|
| 1978 | IMSA+2.5 | 90 | G | Porsche 935/77A | (United States) Dick Barbour Racing | (United Kingdom) Brian Redman (United States) Dick Barbour | 337 | 5th | 1st |
| 1980 | IMSA | 73 | G | Porsche 935 JLP-2 | (United States) J.L.P. Racing | (United Kingdom) Guy Edwards (United States) John Paul Jr. | 312 | 9th | 2nd |
| 1982 | IMSA GTX | 72 | M | Ferrari 512BB LM | (United States) N.A.R.T. | (France) Alain Cudini (United States) John Morton | 306 | 9th | 4th |

=== Complete 24 Hours of Daytona results ===
| Year | Class | No | Tyres | Car | Team | Co-Drivers | Laps | Pos. | Class Pos. |
|---|---|---|---|---|---|---|---|---|---|
| 1977 | GTO | 38 | G | Porsche 911 Carrera RSR | (United States) John Paul | (United States) John O'Steen (United States) Bob Hagestad | 217 | DNF | |
| 1978 | GTO | 33 | | Porsche 911 Carrera RSR | (Puerto Rico) Boricua Motors | (Puerto Rico) Bonky Fernandez (United States) Phil Currin | 637 | 4th | 2nd |
| 1979 | GTX | 18 | | Porsche 935 JLP-1 | (United States) JLP Racing | (United States) Al Holbert (United States) Michael Keyser | 12 | DNF; Electrics | |
| 1980 | GTX | 09 | | Porsche 935/77A | (United States) Thunderbird Swap Shop | (United States) Al Holbert | 682 | 2nd | 2nd |
| 1981 | GTX | 18 | | Porsche 935 JLP-2 | (United States) JLP Racing | (United States) John Paul Jr. (United States) Gordon Smiley | 53 | DNF; Piston | |
| 1982 | GTP | 8 | | Porsche 935 JLP-2 | (United States) JLP Racing | (United States) John Paul Jr. (Germany) Rolf Stommelen | | DNS | |
| 1982 | GTP | 18 | G | Porsche 935 JLP-3 | (United States) JLP Racing | (United States) John Paul Jr. (Germany) Rolf Stommelen | 719 | 1st | |
| 1983 | GTP | 8 | | Porsche 935 JLP-4 | (United States) JLP Racing | (United States) Phil Currin | 15 | DNF withdrawn | |

=== Complete 12 Hours of Sebring results ===
| Year | Class | No | Tyres | Car | Team | Co-Drivers | Laps | Pos. | Class Pos. |
|---|---|---|---|---|---|---|---|---|---|
| 1977 | GTO | 38 | G | Porsche 911 Carrera RSR | (United States) John Paul Sr. | (United States) John O'Steen (United States) John Graves (United States) Bob Hagestad | 13 | DNF; Engines | |
| 1978 | GTO | 33 | | Porsche 911 Carrera RSR | (United States) JLP Racing | (Puerto Rico) Bonky Fernandez | 233 | 4th | 1st |
| 1979 | GTX | 18 | | Porsche 935 JLP-1 | (United States) JLP Racing | (United States) Al Holbert | 176 | DNF; Transmission | |
| 1980 | GTX | 09 | | Porsche 935/77A | (United States) Thunderbird Swap Shop | (United States) Preston Henn (United States) Al Holbert | 239 | 4th | 4th |
| 1981 | GTX | 8 | G | Porsche 935 JLP-3 | (United States) JLP Racing | (United States) John Paul Jr. | 40 | DNF; Suspension | |
| 1982 | GTP | 18 | G | Porsche 935 JLP-3 | (United States) JLP Racing | (United States) John Paul Jr. | 244 | 1st | |

== See also ==
- List of fugitives from justice who disappeared
