= Hubert Phipps =

Hubert Phipps may refer to:

- Hubert G. Phipps (born 1957), American sculptor and painter
- Hubert Beaumont Phipps (1905–1969), Virginia publisher and editor
