= 1981 IMSA GT Championship =

11th season of the racing series organized by IMSA

Seasons
- ← 1980 1982 →

The 1981 Camel GT Championship season was the 11th season of the IMSA GT Championship auto racing series. It was a series for GTX class Group 5 cars and GTO and GTU class Grand tourer cars. It began January 31, 1981, and ended November 29, 1981, after sixteen rounds.

== Schedule ==
The GTU class did not participate with the GTX and GTO classes in shorter events, instead holding their own separate event which included touring car competitors from the IMSA Champion Spark Plug Challenge, but did not race for points in the IMSA GT Championship. Races marked with All had all classes on track at the same time.

Rnd	Race	Length	Class	Circuit	Date
1	24 Hour Pepsi Challenge	24 Hours	All	Daytona International Speedway	January 31; February 1
2	Coca-Cola 12 Hours of Sebring	12 Hours	All	Sebring International Raceway	March 21
3	Road Atlanta Grand Prix	45 Minutes	GTU	Road Atlanta	April 12
3	Road Atlanta Grand Prix	100 Miles	GTX/GTO	Road Atlanta	April 12
4	Los Angeles Times/Toyota Grand Prix	6 Hours	All	Riverside International Raceway	April 26
5	Datsun Monterey Triple Crown	45 Minutes	GTU	Laguna Seca Raceway	May 3
5	Datsun Monterey Triple Crown	100 Miles	GTX/GTO	Laguna Seca Raceway	May 3
6	Coca-Cola 400	45 Minutes	GTU	Lime Rock Park	May 24
6	Coca-Cola 400	200 Miles	GTX/GTO	Lime Rock Park	May 24
7	Red Roof Inns GT 200	200 Miles	All	Mid-Ohio Sports Car Course	May 31
8	Pepsi Grand Prix	200 km	All	Brainerd International Raceway	June 14
9	Paul Revere 250	250 Miles	All	Daytona International Speedway	July 5
10	Datsun California Grand Prix	100 Miles	GTX/GTO	Sears Point Raceway	July 26
10	Datsun California Grand Prix	75 Miles	GTU	Sears Point Raceway	July 26
11	G.I. Joe's/Camel Grand Prix	45 Minutes	GTU	Portland International Raceway	August 2
11	G.I. Joe's/Camel Grand Prix	100 Miles	GTX/GTO	Portland International Raceway	August 2
12	Molson 1000	6 Hours	All	Mosport Park	August 16
13	Pabst 500	500 Miles	All	Road America	August 23
14	Grand Prix of Road Atlanta	45 Minutes	GTU	Road Atlanta	September 13
14	Grand Prix of Road Atlanta	150 Miles	GTX/GTO	Road Atlanta	September 13
15	Kenwood Stereo 500	500 Miles	All	Pocono Raceway	September 27
16	Camel GT 250	250 Miles	All	Daytona International Speedway	November 29

== Season results ==
Rnd	Circuit	GTX Winning Team	GTO Winning Team	GTU Winning Team	Results
Rnd	Circuit	GTX Winning Drivers	GTO Winning Drivers	GTU Winning Drivers	Results
1	Daytona	(United States) #9 Garretson/Style Auto	(United States) #14 Bavarian Motors Intl.	(United States) #62 Kegel Enterprises	Results
1	Daytona	(United States) Bob Garretson (United States) Bobby Rahal (United Kingdom) Brian Redman	(United States) Alf Gebhardt (Germany) Hans-Joachim Stuck (Switzerland) Walter Brun	(United States) Bill Koll (United States) Jeff Kline (United States) Rob McFarlin	Results
2	Sebring	(United States) #86 Bayside Disposal Racing	(United States) #58 Charles Kendall	(United States) #98 Kent Racing	Results
2	Sebring	(United States) Hurley Haywood (United States) Al Holbert (United States) Bruce Leven	(United States) Chuck Kendall (United States) Pete Smith (United States) Dennis Aase	(United States) Lee Mueller (United States) Walt Bohren	Results
3	Road Atlanta	(United Kingdom) #1 John Fitzpatrick Racing	(United States) #25 Red Lobster Racing	(United States) #7 Kent Racing	Results
3	Road Atlanta	(United Kingdom) John Fitzpatrick	(United States) Dave Cowart	(United States) Walt Bohren	Results
4	Riverside	(United Kingdom) #1 John Fitzpatrick Racing	(United States) #25 Red Lobster Racing	(United States) #23 Raytown Datsun	Results
4	Riverside	(United Kingdom) John Fitzpatrick (United States) Jim Busby	(United States) Dave Cowart (United States) Kenper Miller	(United States) Frank Carney (United States) Dick Davenport	Results
5	Laguna Seca	(United States) #7 Kent-Cooke/Wood Racing	(United States) #25 Red Lobster Racing	(United States) #92 Kent Racing	Results
5	Laguna Seca	(United Kingdom) Brian Redman	(United States) Dave Cowart	(United States) Lee Mueller	Results
6	Lime Rock	(United States) #7 Kent-Cooke/Wood Racing	(United States) #25 Red Lobster Racing	(United States) #98 Kent Racing	Results
6	Lime Rock	(United Kingdom) Brian Redman	(United States) Dave Cowart (United States) Kenper Miller	(United States) Walt Bohren	Results
7	Mid-Ohio	(United States) #7 Kent-Cooke/Wood Racing	(United States) #25 Red Lobster Racing	(United States) #85 Logan Blackburn	Results
7	Mid-Ohio	(United Kingdom) Brian Redman	(United States) Dave Cowart (United States) Kenper Miller	(United States) Logan Blackburn	Results
8	Brainerd	(United States) #6 Team Zakspeed Roush	(United States) #25 Red Lobster Racing	(United States) #92 Kent Racing	Results
8	Brainerd	(Germany) Klaus Ludwig	(United States) Dave Cowart	(United States) Lee Mueller	Results
9	Daytona	(Colombia) #46 DeNarvaez Enterprises	(United States) #25 Red Lobster Racing	(United States) #23 Raytown Datsun	Results
9	Daytona	(Colombia) Mauricio de Narváez (United States) Hurley Haywood	(United States) Dave Cowart (United States) Kenper Miller	(United States) Dick Davenport	Results
10	Sears Point	(United States) #6 Team Zakspeed Roush	(United States) #11 Kendall Racing	(United States) #22 Personalized Autohaus	Results
10	Sears Point	(Germany) Klaus Ludwig	(United States) Dennis Aase	(United States) Wayne Baker	Results
11	Portland	(United States) #7 Kent-Cooke/Wood Racing	(United States) #25 Red Lobster Racing	(United States) #92 Kent Racing	Results
11	Portland	(United Kingdom) Brian Redman	(United States) Dave Cowart	(United States) Lee Mueller	Results
12	Mosport	(Germany) #3 Andial Meister Racing	(United States) #25 Red Lobster Racing	(United States) #92 Kent Racing	Results
12	Mosport	(Germany) Rolf Stommelen (Germany) Harald Grohs	(United States) Dave Cowart (United States) Kenper Miller	(United States) Lee Mueller (United States) Walt Bohren	Results
13	Road America	(Germany) #3 Andial Meister Racing	(United States) #11 Kendall Racing	(United States) #92 Kent Racing	Results
13	Road America	(Germany) Rolf Stommelen (Germany) Harald Grohs	(United States) Chuck Kendall (United States) Pete Smith (United States) Dennis Aase	(United States) Lee Mueller (United States) Walt Bohren	Results
14	Road Atlanta	(United States) #7 Kent-Cooke/Woods Racing	(United States) #25 Red Lobster Racing	(United States) #98 Kent Racing	Results
14	Road Atlanta	(United Kingdom) Brian Redman	(United States) Kenper Miller	(United States) Walt Bohren	Results
15	Pocono	(United States) #18 JLP Racing	(United States) #25 Red Lobster Racing	(United States) #98 Kent Racing	Results
15	Pocono	(United States) John Paul, Sr. (United States) John Paul Jr.	(United States) Dave Cowart (United States) Kenper Miller	(United States) Walt Bohren (United States) Rick Knoop	Results
16	Daytona	(United States) #18 JLP Racing	(United States) #25 Red Lobster Racing	(United States) #98 Kent Racing	Results
16	Daytona	(United States) John Paul Jr.	(United States) Dave Cowart (United States) Kenper Miller	(United States) Walt Bohren	Results
