= 1982 IMSA GT Championship =

12th season of the racing series organized by IMSA

Seasons
- ← 1981 1983 →

The 1982 Camel GT Championship season was the 12th season of the IMSA GT Championship auto racing series. It was the first year of the GTP class, which combined the previous GTX class of Group 5 cars and prototypes. Other competitors ran in the GTO and GTU classes of Grand Tourer-style racing cars. It began January 30, 1982, and ended November 28, 1982, after nineteen rounds.

John Paul Junior won the GTP category driving a Porsche 935 and a Lola T600 Chevrolet. Don Devendorf won GTO and Jim Downing won GTU.

== Schedule ==
The GTU class did not participate with the GTP and GTO classes in shorter events, instead holding their own separate event which included touring car competitors from the IMSA Champion Spark Plug Challenge. These touring cars did not race for points in the IMSA GT Championship. Races marked with All had all classes on track at the same time.

Rnd	Race	Length	Class	Circuit	Date
1	24 Hour Pepsi Challenge	24 hours	All	Daytona International Speedway	January 30; January 31
2	Coca-Cola 12 Hours of Sebring	12 hours	All	Sebring International Raceway	March 20
3	Road Atlanta Grand Prix	150 miles (240 km)	GTP/GTO	Road Atlanta	April 4
3	Road Atlanta Grand Prix	45 minutes	GTU	Road Atlanta	April 4
4	Los Angeles Times/Toyota Grand Prix	6 hours	All	Riverside International Raceway	April 25
5	Datsun Monterey Triple Crown	45 minutes	GTU	Laguna Seca Raceway	May 2
5	Datsun Monterey Triple Crown	100 miles (160 km)	GTP/GTO	Laguna Seca Raceway	May 2
6	Charlotte Camel GT 500	500 km	All	Charlotte Motor Speedway	May 16
7	Red Roof Inns Sprints	1 hour	GTU	Mid-Ohio Sports Car Course	May 23
7	Red Roof Inns Sprints	100 miles (160 km)	GTP/GTO	Mid-Ohio Sports Car Course	May 23
8	Coca-Cola 400	1 hour	GTP/GTO	Lime Rock Park	May 31
8	Coca-Cola 400	45 minutes	GTU	Lime Rock Park	May 31
9	The NTW 300	100 miles (160 km)	GTU	Summit Point Motorsports Park	June 20
10	Paul Revere 250	250 miles (400 km)	All	Daytona International Speedway	July 3
11	Pepsi Grand Prix	200 km	All	Brainerd International Raceway	July 11
12	California Grand Prix	100 miles (160 km)	GTP/GTO	Sears Point Raceway	July 25
12	California Grand Prix	75 miles (121 km)	GTU	Sears Point Raceway	July 25
13	G.I. Joe's/Toyota Grand Prix	100 miles (160 km)	GTP/GTO	Portland International Raceway	August 1
13	G.I. Joe's/Toyota Grand Prix	30 minutes	GTU	Portland International Raceway	August 1
14	Labatt's 50 GT	6 hours	All	Mosport Park	August 15
15	Pabst 500	500 miles (800 km)	All	Road America	August 22
16	Lumbermen's Six Hours	6 hours	All	Mid-Ohio Sports Car Course	September 5
17	Sprite 500	500 km	All	Road Atlanta	September 12
18	Grand Prix of Pocono	500 miles (800 km)	All	Pocono Raceway	September 26
19	Daytona Three Hour	3 hours	All	Daytona International Speedway	November 28

== Season results ==
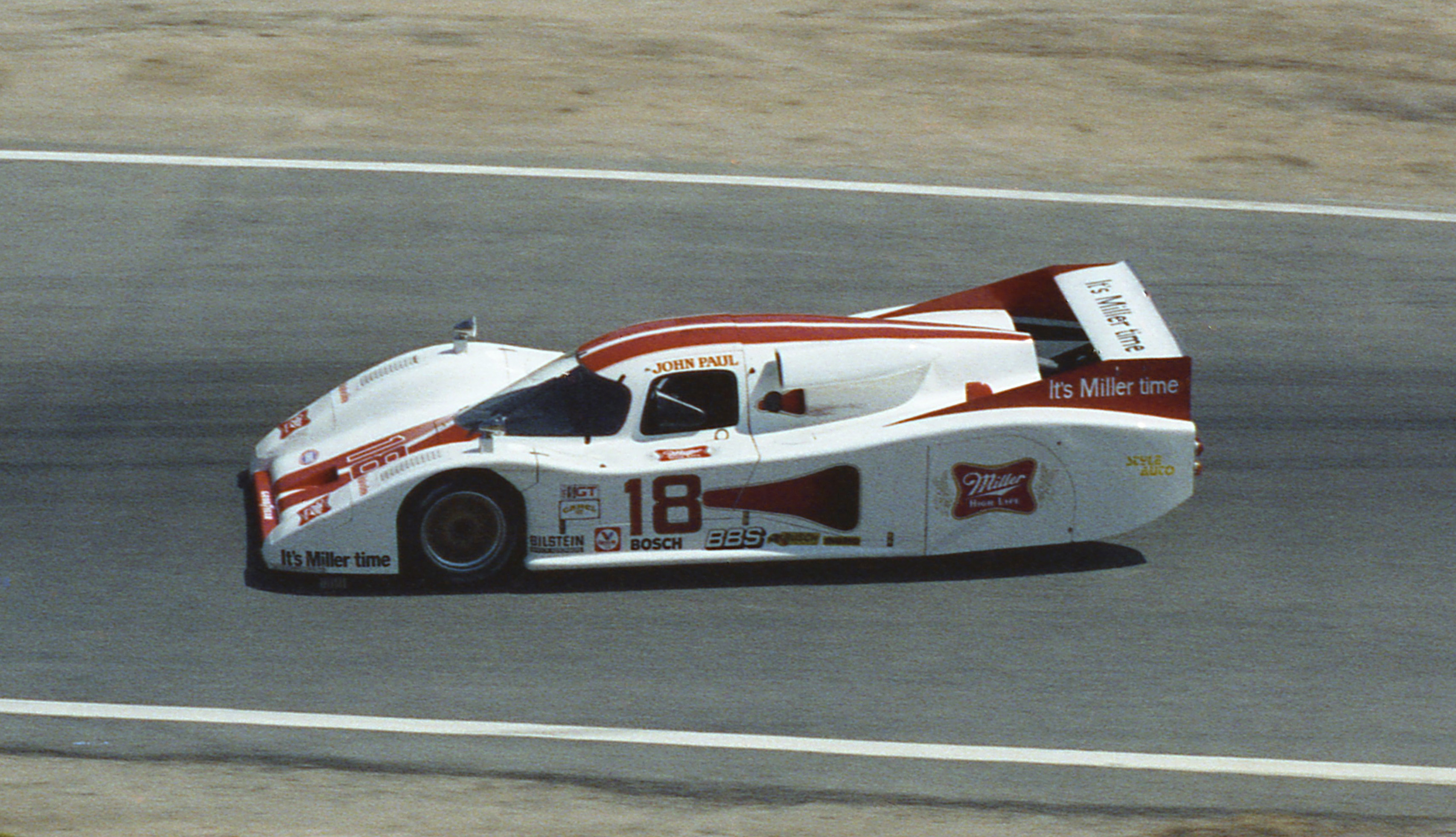
John Paul Jr. won the GTP title driving a Porsche 935 and a Lola T600 (pictured above at the Laguna Seca round)

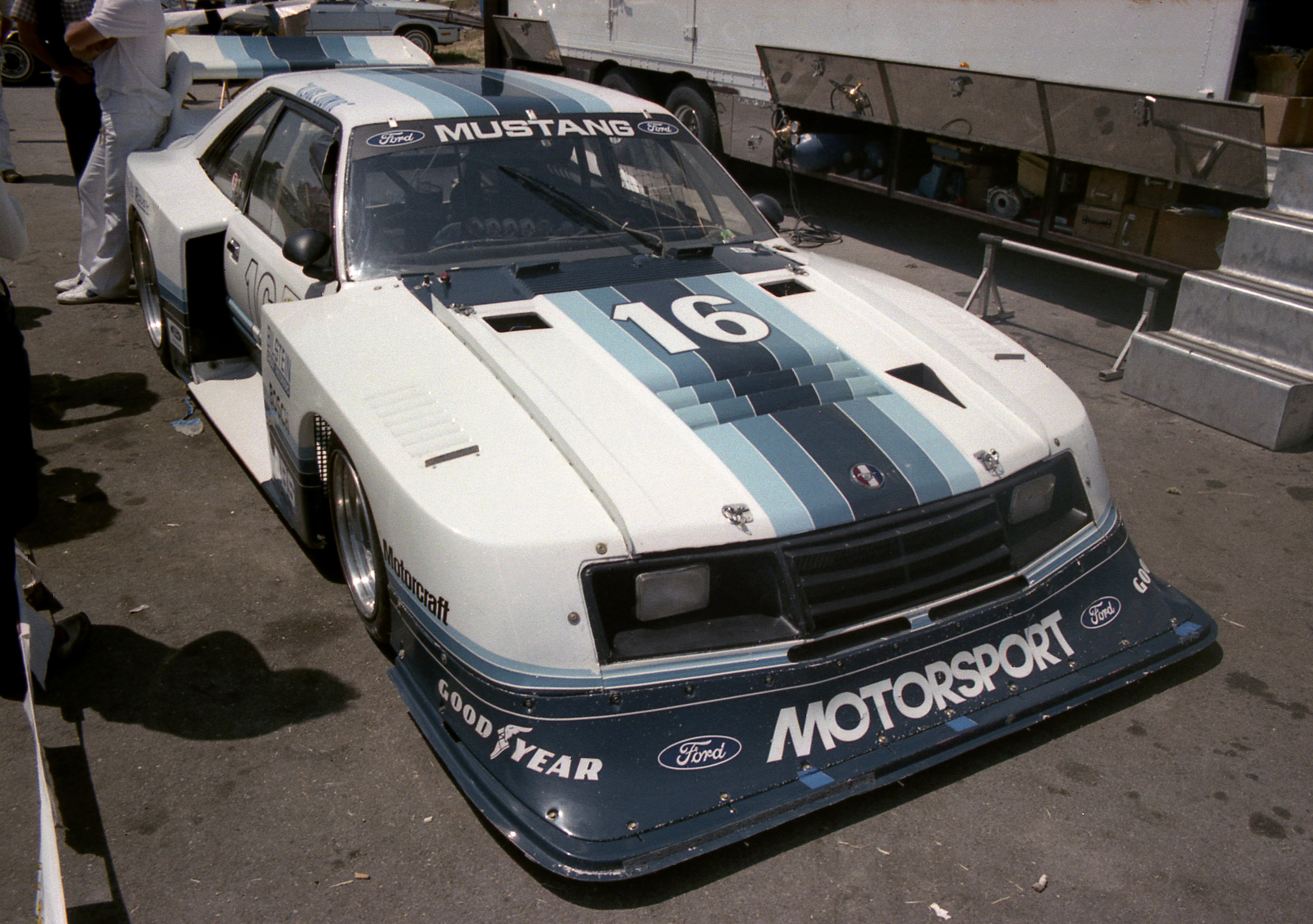
Klaus Ludwig won the Sears Point round driving a Ford Mustang Turbo. The car is pictured at Laguna Seca.

Rnd	Circuit	GTP Winning Team	GTO Winning Team	GTU Winning Team	Results
Rnd	Circuit	GTP Winning Drivers	GTO Winning Drivers	GTU Winning Drivers	Results
1	Daytona	(United States) #18 JLP Racing	(United States) #77 Mazda North America	(United States) #98 Kent Racing	Results
1	Daytona	(United States) John Paul, Sr. (United States) John Paul Jr. (Germany) Rolf Stommelen	(Japan) Yojiro Terada (Japan) Yoshimi Katayama (Japan) Takashi Yorino	(United States) Lee Mueller (United States) Kathy Rude (Canada) Allan Moffat	Results
2	Sebring	(United States) #18 JLP Racing	(Puerto Rico) #9 Diego Febles Racing	(United States) #38 Mandeville Auto Tech	Results
2	Sebring	(United States) John Paul, Sr. (United States) John Paul Jr.	(Puerto Rico) Diego Febles (Puerto Rico) Tato Ferrer (Puerto Rico) Chiqui Soldevilla	(United States) Roger Mandeville (United States) Jeff Kline (United States) Amos Johnson	Results
3	Road Atlanta	(United States) #18 JLP Racing	(United States) #11 Kendall Racing	(United States) #85 Alderman Datsun	Results
3	Road Atlanta	(United States) John Paul Jr.	(United States) Dennis Aase	(United States) Logan Blackburn	Results
4	Riverside	(United States) #0 Interscope Racing	(United States) #05 T&R Racing	(United States) #82 Trinity Racing	Results
4	Riverside	(United States) Ted Field (United States) Bill Whittington	(United States) Tico Almeida (Venezuela) Ernesto Soto	(United States) Jim Cook (United States) Jim Mullen	Results
5	Laguna Seca	(United States) #18 JLP Racing	(United States) #82 Electramotive	(United States) #82 Casey-Montex	Results
5	Laguna Seca	(United States) John Paul Jr.	(United States) Don Devendorf	(United States) Joe Varde	Results
6	Charlotte	(United States) #18 JLP Racing	(United States) #44 Stratagraph	(United States) #85 Alderman Datsun	Results
6	Charlotte	(United States) John Paul, Sr. (United States) John Paul Jr.	(United States) Billy Hagan (United States) Gene Felton	(United States) George Alderman (United States) Logan Blackburn	Results
7	Mid-Ohio	(United Kingdom) #2 John Fitzpatrick Racing	(United States) #82 Electramotive	(United States) #63 Jim Downing	Results
7	Mid-Ohio	(United Kingdom) John Fitzpatrick	(United States) Don Devendorf	(United States) Jim Downing	Results
8	Lime Rock	(United Kingdom) #2 John Fitzpatrick Racing	(United States) #83 Electramotive	(United States) #82 Casey-Montex	Results
8	Lime Rock	(United Kingdom) John Fitzpatrick	(United States) Don Devendorf	(United States) Joe Varde	Results
9	Summit Point	Did not participate	Did not participate	(United States) #82 Casey-Montex	Results
9	Summit Point			(United States) Joe Varde	Results
10	Daytona	(United States) #0 Interscope Racing	(Colombia) #55 Diego Montoya	(United States) #85 Alderman Datsun	Results
10	Daytona	(United States) Ted Field (United States) Danny Ongais	(Colombia) Diego Montoya	(United States) Logan Blackburn	Results
11	Brainerd	(United States) #18 JLP Racing	(United States) #05 Tico Almeida	(United States) #85 Alderman Datsun	Results
11	Brainerd	(United States) John Paul Jr.	(United States) Tico Almeida	(United States) Logan Blackburn	Results
12	Sears Point	(United States) #16 Zakspeed Roush	(United States) #83 Electramotive	(United States) #82 Casey-Montex	Results
12	Sears Point	(Germany) Klaus Ludwig	(United States) Don Devendorf	(United States) Joe Varde	Results
13	Portland	(United States) #18 JLP Racing	(United States) #83 Electramotive	(United States) #38 Mandeville Auto Tech	Results
13	Portland	(United States) John Paul Jr.	(United States) Don Devendorf	(United States) Roger Mandeville	Results
14	Mosport	(United States) #46 JLP Racing	(United States) #91 Electrodyne	(United States) #38 Mandeville Auto Tech	Results
14	Mosport	(United States) John Paul, Sr. (United States) John Paul Jr.	(United States) Wayne Baker (United States) Chester Vincentz	(United States) Roger Mandeville (United States) Amos Johnson	Results
15	Road America	(United Kingdom) #2 John Fitzpatrick Racing	(United States) #14 Oftedahl Racing	(United States) #82 Casey-Montex	Results
15	Road America	(United Kingdom) John Fitzpatrick (United Kingdom) David Hobbs	(United States) Bob Raub (United States) Chris Gleason	(United States) Joe Varde (United States) Jeff Kline	Results
16	Mid-Ohio	(United Kingdom) #2 John Fitzpatrick Racing	(United States) #82 Electramotive	(United States) #32 Alderman Datsun	Results
16	Mid-Ohio	(United Kingdom) John Fitzpatrick (United Kingdom) David Hobbs	(United States) Don Devendorf (United States) Tony Adamowicz	(United States) Logan Blackburn (United States) George Alderman	Results
17	Road Atlanta	(United States) #46 JLP Racing	(United States) #13 T&R Racing	(United States) #38 Mandeville Auto Tech	Results
17	Road Atlanta	(United States) John Paul, Sr. (United States) John Paul Jr.	(United States) John Greenwood (United States) Rene Rodriguez	(United States) Roger Mandeville (United States) Amos Johnson	Results
18	Pocono	(United States) #0 Interscope Racing	(United States) #91 Electrodyne	(United States) #63 Jim Downing	Results
18	Pocono	(United States) Ted Field (United States) Danny Ongais	(United States) Wayne Backer (United States) Chester Vincentz	(United States) Jim Downing (United States) John Maffucci	Results
19	Daytona	(United States) #00 Interscope Racing	(United States) #44 Stratagraph	(United States) #63 Jim Downing	Results
19	Daytona	(United States) Ted Field (United States) Danny Ongais	(United States) Billy Hagan (United States) Gene Felton	(United States) Jim Downing (United States) John Maffucci	Results

== Series standings ==
John Paul Junior won the GTP category driving a Porsche 935 and a Lola T600 Chevrolet. Don Devendorf won GTO and Jim Downing won GTU.
