= 1981 World Endurance Championship =

Racing tournament

1981 World Sportscar Championship

Seasons
- ← 1980 1982 →

The 1981 World Sportscar Championship season was the 29th season of FIA World Sportscar Championship motor racing. It featured the 1981 FIA World Endurance Championship which was contested over a fifteen race series which ran from 31 January to 27 September. The former World Challenge for Endurance Drivers was renamed to the World Endurance Championship of Drivers for 1981 and the World Championship of Makes was renamed to the World Endurance Championship of Makes. Bob Garretson won the World Endurance Championship of Drivers and Lancia was awarded the World Endurance Championship of Makes.

Some races, such as the 24 Hours of Daytona, 12 Hours of Sebring, and Riverside, also counted towards the IMSA championship. However, from the 1982 season onwards, there would no longer be races in the United States counting towards the World Sport Car Championship. In turn, some European races, such as the 24 Hours of Spa-Fancorchamps and the 1,000 Kilometers of Nurburgring, attracted only teams more focused on the touring car category, not strictly sports cars. Partly as a result of this, teams and drivers could not commit to competing in all 15 rounds of the championship.

For the Drivers Championship, this season displayed one of the most complex points scoring system ever devised by a FIA sanctioned championship.

862 drivers started at least one round of the 1981 World Endurance Championship.

== Schedule ==
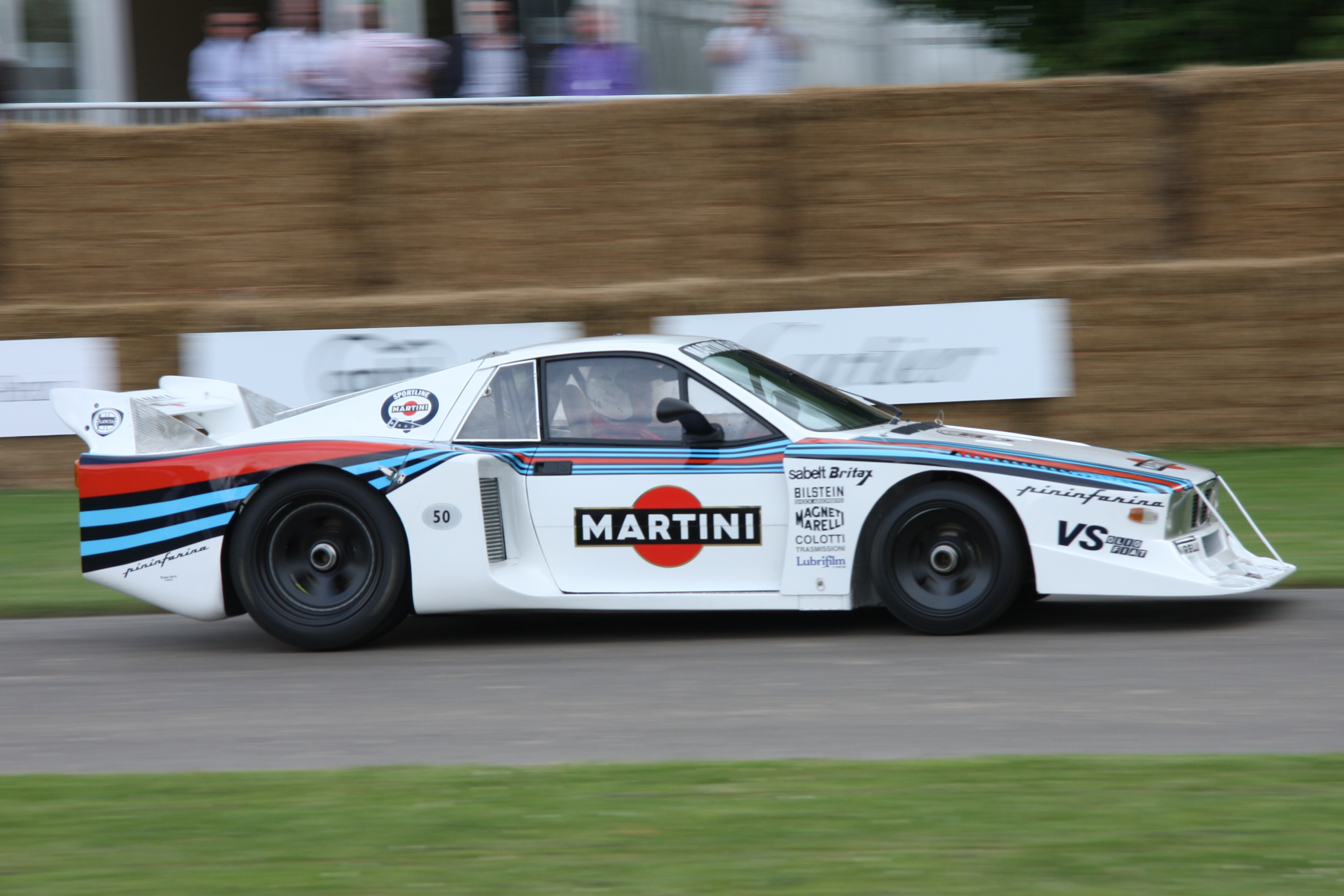
Lancia won the 1981 World Endurance Championship of Makes with its Beta Montecarlos

World Endurance Championship of Drivers was contested over all fifteen races however only six of the races counted towards the World Endurance Championship of Makes.

Drivers Rd.	Makes Rd.	Race	Circuit	Date
1	1	(United States) 24 Hours Pepsi Challenge	Daytona International Speedway	31 January; 1 February
2	-	(United States) Coca-Cola 12 Hours of Sebring	Sebring International Raceway	21 March
3	-	(Italy) Mugello 6 Hours	Mugello Circuit	12 April
4	2	(Italy) 1000km Monza	Autodromo Nazionale Monza	26 April
5	-	(United States) Los Angeles Times Toyota Grand Prix (6 Hours)	Riverside International Raceway	26 April
6	3	(United Kingdom) Silverstone 6 Hours	Silverstone Circuit	10 May
7	4	(Germany) 1000km Nürburgring	Nürburgring	24 May
8	5	(France) 24 Hours of Le Mans	Circuit de la Sarthe	13 June; 14 June
9	-	(Italy) Coppa Florio (6 Hours)	Autodromo di Pergusa	28 June
10	-	(United States) 6 Hours of Daytona Champion Spark Plug Challenge	Daytona International Speedway	2 July
11	6	(United States) 6 Hours of Watkins Glen	Watkins Glen International	12 July
12	-	(Belgium) 24 Hours of Spa-Francorchamps	Circuit de Spa-Francorchamps	26 July; 27 July
13	-	(Canada) Molson 1000 Kilometres (6 Hours)	Mosport Park	16 August
14	-	(United States) Pabst 500 Miles	Road America	23 August
15	-	(United Kingdom) Flying Tigers 1000 Kilometres	Brands Hatch	27 September

== Season results ==
Although various classes of cars contested the championship races, only the overall race winners are listed in the table below.

Rnd	Circuit	Overall Winning Team	Results
Rnd	Circuit	Overall Winning Drivers	Results
Rnd	Circuit	Overall Winning Car	Results
1	Daytona	(United States) #9 Garretson Racing	Results
1	Daytona	(United States) Bob Garretson (United States) Bobby Rahal (United Kingdom) Brian Redman	Results
1	Daytona	Porsche 935	Results
2	Sebring	(United States) #86 Bayside Disposal Racing	Results
2	Sebring	(United States) Al Holbert (United States) Hurley Haywood (United States) Bruce Leven	Results
2	Sebring	Porsche 935	Results
3	Mugello	(Italy) #14 Osella Squadra Corse	Results
3	Mugello	(Italy) Giorgio Francia (Italy) Lella Lombardi	Results
3	Mugello	Osella PA9 BMW	Results
4	Monza	(Germany) #3 Weralit Racing Team	Results
4	Monza	(Germany) Edgar Dören (Germany) Jürgen Lässig (Germany) Gerhard Holup	Results
4	Monza	Porsche 935	Results
5	Riverside	(United Kingdom) #1 John Fitzpatrick Racing	Results
5	Riverside	(United Kingdom) John Fitzpatrick (United States) Jim Busby	Results
5	Riverside	Porsche 935 K3	Results
6	Silverstone	(Germany) #22 Vegla Racing Team	Results
6	Silverstone	(Germany) Harald Grohs (Germany) Walter Röhrl (Germany) Dieter Schornstein	Results
6	Silverstone	Porsche 935	Results
7	Nürburgring	(Germany) #12 GS Tuning	Results
7	Nürburgring	(Germany) Hans-Joachim Stuck (Brazil) Nelson Piquet	Results
7	Nürburgring	BMW M1	Results
8	La Sarthe	(Germany) #11 Porsche System	Results
8	La Sarthe	(Belgium) Jacky Ickx (United Kingdom) Derek Bell	Results
8	La Sarthe	Porsche 936/81	Results
9	Pergusa	(United Kingdom) #3 Grid Team Lola	Results
9	Pergusa	(United Kingdom) Guy Edwards (Spain) Emilio de Villota	Results
9	Pergusa	Lola T600 Ford Cosworth DFV	Results
10	Daytona	(United States) #38 Mandeville Racing	Results
10	Daytona	(United States) Roger Mandeville (United States) Amos Johnson	Results
10	Daytona	Mazda RX-7	Results
11	Watkins Glen	(Italy) #1 Martini Racing	Results
11	Watkins Glen	(Italy) Riccardo Patrese (Italy) Michele Alboreto	Results
11	Watkins Glen	Lancia Beta Montecarlo	Results
12	Spa	(United Kingdom) #40 Tom Walkinshaw Racing	Results
12	Spa	(United Kingdom) Tom Walkinshaw (Belgium) Pierre Dieudonné	Results
12	Spa	Mazda RX-7	Results
13	Mosport	(Germany) #3 Andial Meister Racing	Results
13	Mosport	(Germany) Harald Grohs (Germany) Rolf Stommelen	Results
13	Mosport	Porsche 935	Results
14	Road America	(Germany) #3 Andial Meister Racing	Results
14	Road America	(Germany) Harald Grohs (Germany) Rolf Stommelen	Results
14	Road America	Porsche 935	Results
15	Brands Hatch	(United Kingdom) #3 Banco Occidental Ultramar Lola	Results
15	Brands Hatch	(United Kingdom) Guy Edwards (Spain) Emilio de Villota	Results
15	Brands Hatch	Lola T600 Ford Cosworth DFL	Results

- The 24 Hours of Daytona, the 12 Hours of Sebring, the Los Angeles Times Grand Prix and the Road America 500 were also rounds of the 1981 IMSA GT Championship.
- The 6 Hours of Daytona was restricted to Racing Stock class cars (i.e. IMSA RS).
- The 24 Hours of Spa was restricted to Belgian Touring Cars (i.e. Group 1).

== World Endurance Championship of Drivers ==
The World Endurance Championship of Drivers was open to FIA Group 1, Group 2, Group 3, Group 4, Group 5, Group 6, Group C and GTP cars and to IMSA GTX, IMSA GTP, IMSA AAGT, IMSA GTO, IMSA GTU and IMSA RS cars.

Drivers Championship points were awarded on a 20-19-18-17-16-15-14-13-12-11-10-9-8-7-6-5-4-3-2-1 basis to the first twenty overall finishers at each round. Bonus points were also awarded as follows:

- 0 points for Category 1 (Group 6 over 2 litres)
- 1 point for Category 2 (Group 5 over 2 litres, GTP over 2 litres, Group C over 2 litres, IMSA GTX over 2 litres, IMSA GTP over 2 litres, IMSA AAGT)
- 2 points for Category 3 (Group 6 under 2 litres, Group 5 under 2 litres, Group 4 under 2 litres, IMSA GTO, IMSA GTX under 2 litres)
- 3 points for Category 4 (GTP under 2 litres, Group 2 over 2 litres, IMSA GTU, Group C under 2 litres)
- 4 points for Category 5 (Group 4 under 2 litres, Group 1 over 2 litres)
- 5 points for Category 6 (Group 2 under 2 litres, Group 1 under 2 litres, IMSA RS)

Only half points were awarded at the shortened Nürburgring round. All points scored were retained towards the championship totals.

=== Results ===
Position	Driver	Car	Points
1	Bob Garretson	Porsche 935 K3 & 935	127
2	Harald Grohs	Porsche 935 & 935 K3	116.5
3	Bobby Rahal	Porsche 935 K3 & 935/78-81	109
4	Edgar Dören	Porsche 935 K3 & Porsche 935	107.5
5	Giorgio Francia	Osella PA9 BMW	101
=	Lella Lombardi	Osella PA9 BMW	101
7	Derek Bell	BMW M1 & Porsche 935	96
8	Bob Akin	Porsche 935 K3 & 935	84
9	Jim Busby	Porsche 935 K3 & 935	81
10	Brian Redman	Porsche 935 K3 & Lola T600	80
11	John C Cooper	Porsche 935 K3 & Chevrolet Camaro	73.5
12	John Fitzpatrick	Porsche 935 K3 & 935	71
13	Dudley Wood	Porsche 935 K3	67
14	Hurley Haywood	Porsche 935 & Mazda RX-3	65
15	Lee Mueller	Mazda RX-7	63
16	Rolf Stommelen	Porsche 935 K3	60
=	Walt Bohren	Mazda RX-7	60
18	Jürgen Lässig	Porsche 935 K3 & BMW M1	56.5
=	Dieter Schornstein	Porsche 935	56.5
20	Ralph Kent Cooke	Porsche 935 K3 & 935	54
21	Marion L Speer	Mazda RX-7 & Porsche 914/6	53
=	Emilio de Villota	Lola T600 Ford	53
=	Bill Whittington	Porsche 935 K3 & 935	53
=	Guy Edwards	Lola T600 Ford	53
25	Roger Mandeville	Mazda RX-7, Mazda RX-3	52
=	Amos Johnson	Mazda RX-7, Mazda RX-3	52
27	Jacques Guerin	Porsche 935 & BMW 530i	50
28	Luigi Moreschi	Osella PA9 BMW	49
=	Gimax	Osella PA9 BMW	49
30	Jim Downing	Mazda RX-7, Mazda RX-3	46
31	Richard Lloyd	Porsche 924 Carrera GTR	45
=	Frank Carney	Datsun ZX & Datsun 280ZX	45
=	Dick Davenport	Datsun ZX & Datsun 280ZX	45
34	Siegfried Brunn	Porsche 908/3 & Porsche Carrera	44
=	Eddie Jordan	Porsche 908/3 & BMW M1	44
36	Pete Smith	Porsche Carrera & BMW M1	43
=	Chuck Kendall	Porsche Carrera & BMW M1	43
38	David Hobbs	BMW M1 & March 81P	42
39	Jean-Claude Andruet	Ferrari 512 BB/LM & BMW 530i	41
=	Gianpiero Moretti	Porsche 935/78-81	41
=	Tom Walkinshaw	Mazda RX-7	41
42	Ray Ratcliff	Porsche 914/6 & Mazda RX-7	40.5
43	Tony Garcia	BMW M1 & Porsche Carrera	40
=	Hiram Cruz	BMW M1 & Porsche Carrera	40
=	Albert Naon	BMW M1 & Porsche Carrera	40
46	Dirk Vermeersch	Mazda RX-7 & BMW 530i	39
=	Eddy Joosen	Mazda RX-7 & BMW 530i	39
48	Pierre Dieudonné	Mazda RX-7 & Ferrari 512 BB/LM	38
=	Roy Woods	Porsche 935 K3 & 935	38
=	Bruce Leven	Porsche 935	38

A total of 371 drivers scored points in the 1981 World Endurance Championship of Drivers.

== World Endurance Championship of Makes ==
The World Endurance Championship of Makes was open FIA Group 1, Group 2, Group 3, Group 4 and Group 5 cars and to IMSA GTX cars.

Cars from all eligible groups were combined, and then divided into two Divisions based on engine capacity. Points were awarded on a 20-15-12-10-8-6-4-3-2-1 basis for the top ten places in each Division at each race. Only the best placed car of each make in each division at each race was eligible to score points. Cars from groups not included in the championship (e.g. FIA Group 6 cars) were disregarded when assessing divisional positions for championship purposes. Only half points were awarded for the shortened Nurburgring race. The best five round results could be retained by each make.

=== Results ===
The overall World Endurance Championship of Makes title was won by Lancia. Although both Lancia and Porsche scored 100 points from their best five class results, Lancia was awarded the title based on its six divisional victories against the five scored by Porsche .

==== Over 2000 cc ====
Pos	Manufacturer	Rd 1	Rd 2	Rd 3	Rd 4	Rd 5	Rd 6	Total
1	(Germany) Porsche	20	20	20	(7.5)	20	20	100
2	(Germany) BMW	8	15	15	10	4		52
3	(Italy) Ferrari		3			15		15
4	(Italy) Lancia				6			6
5	(United Kingdom) Morgan			2				2

==== Under 2000 cc ====
Pos	Manufacturer	Rd 1	Rd 2	Rd 3	Rd 4	Rd 5	Rd 6	Total
1	(Italy) Lancia	20	20	20	(10)	20	20	100
2	(Germany) BMW			15	7.5			22.5
3	(Germany) Opel				5			5
4	(United States) Ford				4			4
5	(Japan) Toyota				2			2
6	(Italy) Alfa Romeo				0.5			0.5
