= Hubert G. Phipps =

American sculptor and painter (b. 1957)

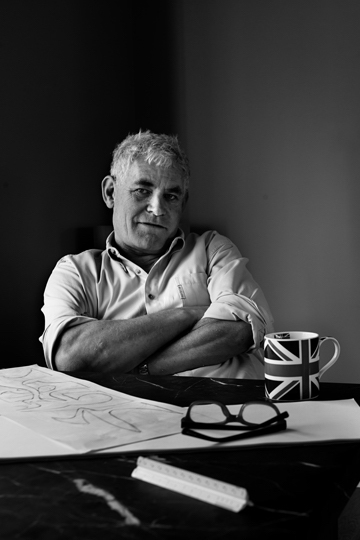
- Phipps in 2017
- Born: Hubert Grace Phipps; November 21, 1957 (age 68); Virginia, U.S.
- Education: Art Students League of New York San Francisco Art Institute, Miami Miami International University of Art & Design
- Known for: Artist Sculptor Racing
- Website: hubertphipps.com

Hubert G. Phipps (November 1, 1957 – June 18, 2023) was an American sculptor and painter who divided his time between Middleburg, Virginia and New York City. Known for his paint pigment drawings and abstract sculptures, Phipps experimented with various forms and materials, including steel, bronze, wood, composites, plaster, glass, and marble. He was also a race car driver and a member of the Phipps family.

Phipps’ work has been exhibited at the Colorado Springs Fine Arts Center at Colorado College, the Ann Norton Sculpture Garden in West Palm Beach, the New York Studio School, the Center for Creative Education in West Palm Beach, the Fritz Gallery, MM Fine Arts Gallery in Southampton, New York, Coral Springs Museum of Art, Coral Springs, Florida, and Gallery 1608 in West Palm. His work has also been accepted into the permanent collections of the Coral Springs Museum of Art, the Harn Museum of Art in Gainesville, Florida, and the Tufts University Art Gallery.

== Life ==
Born in Virginia to Lady Phoebe Pleydell-Bouverie and Hubert Beaumont Phipps, Phipps started drawing at an early age. He developed skills as an illustrator, initially transcribing political cartoons. His father owned and operated local newspaper publications and was well-known in the cattle-breeding and horse racing circles. After his father died, Phipps then went to live with guardians in Palm Beach, Florida. He attended Deerfield Academy. At Deerfield, Phipps discovered a passion for flying, something that he would continue throughout life. Since then, he has logged more than 3,500 hours as a pilot-in-command in both rotorcraft and fixed wing. He is the cousin of sculptor Susan Phipps Cochran.

In 1974, Phipps studied at The Art Student's League in Manhattan. Later, in 1978, Phipps attended the San Francisco Art Institute before pursuing a career as a professional race car driver.

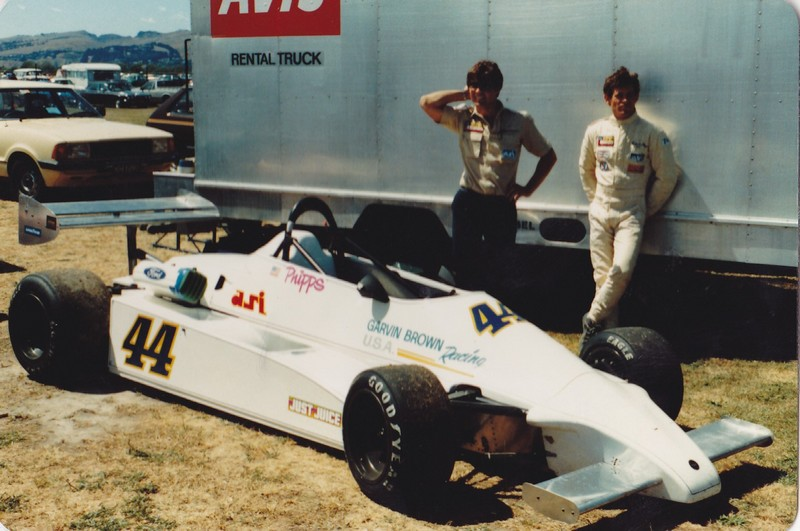
Phipps and his TIGA FA 82

From 1979 to 1985, Phipps turned in solid performances, including winning the SCCA Formula Atlantic National championship, driving a Ralt RT4 powered by Ford. Despite incurring serious injuries during testing at the Sears Point Raceway in Sonoma, California in 1983, Phipps recovered and went on to achieve wins in the Formula Atlantic Professional series at Willow Springs, California in 1984, and again in 1985. His professional teammates included Danny Sullivan at Garvin Brown Racing in 1982 and Michael Andretti at Ralt America in 1983.

After retiring as a professional driver, Phipps turned his focus to art again. In 2001, he enrolled in IFAC in Miami to study computer animation, with additional training at Escape Studios in London. Phipps’ interest in animation was specifically to learn how to model forms in the computer as reference for sculpting objects, using traditional media.

In 2002, Phipps participated in Graham Nickson's drawing marathon at the New York Studio School of Drawing, Painting, and Sculpture. It opened his ability to work in large-scale. Phipps was able to draw on his racing and aviation experiences, to develop a distinctive style.

Phipps has studios in Virginia and New York City.

== Work ==
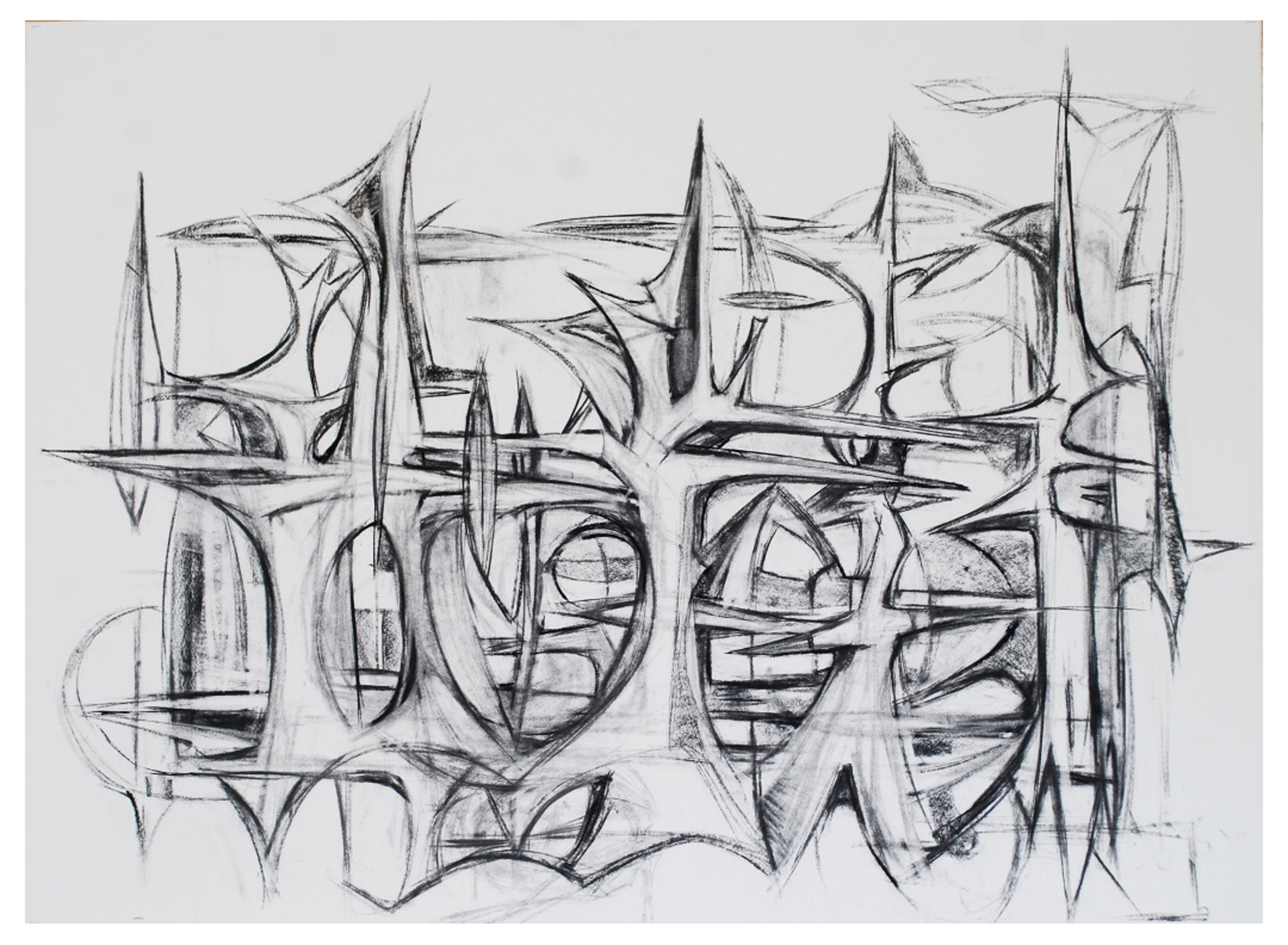
Quantum Universe 46" x 61" Charcoal on paper

=== Drawings and paintings ===
Phipps has many approaches to drawing, including reference photos that he makes on long, cross-country flights and automatic drawing. He lets his subconscious guide the pen or brush until the work takes on a life of its own.

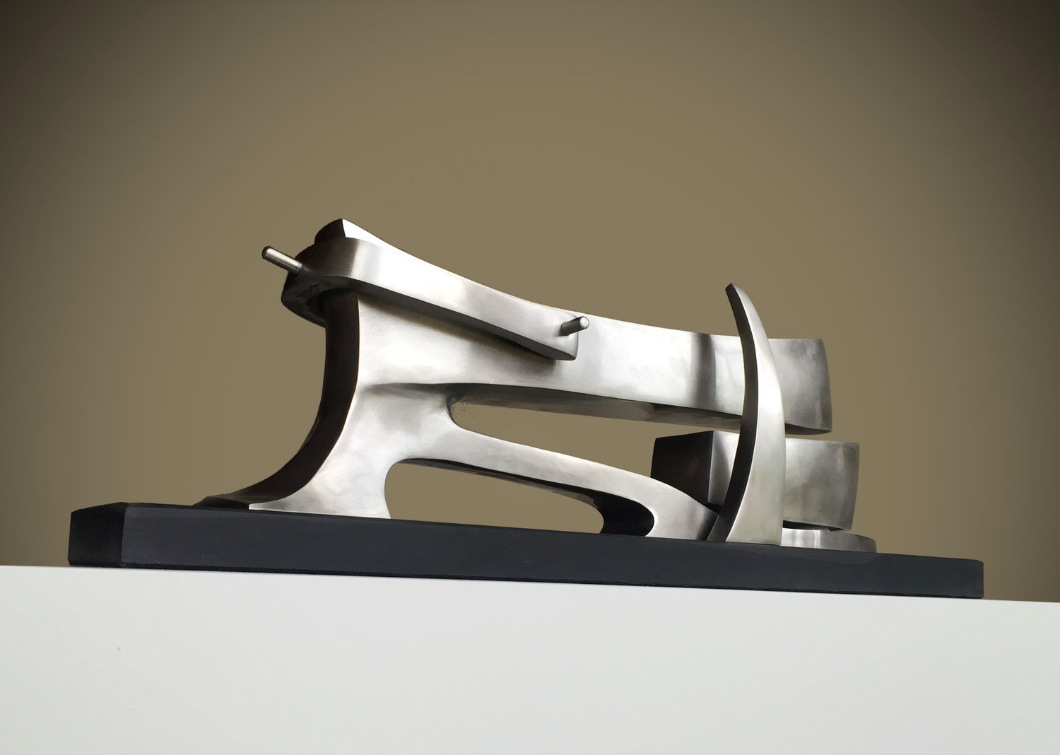
Voyager (2015), Stainless steel, 25" x 8.5" x 7.5"

=== Sculptures ===
Phipps follows many of the traditional approaches of making sculpture, but also uses modern technologies, including 3D computer modeling, 3D scanning, 3D printing, and virtual reality. The sculpture continually changes until the final product reaches the foundry, the fabrication shop, or the CNC milling shop.

A significant influence on Phipps’ work comes from the view he gets while flying. It is not unusual for him to fly cross-country trips, including coast to coast. He amasses photographic images on these trips that are used as reference for sculpture, paintings, and drawings.

== Exhibitions ==
- 2016 Ann Norton Sculpture, Garden Exhibit, West Palm Beach, FL.
- 2016 New York Studio School, Solo Exhibit, New York, NY.
- 2017 Coral Springs Museum of Art, Exhibit, Coral Springs, FL.
- 2018 Center for Creative Education, Exhibit, West Palm Beach, FL.
- 2018 Studio 1608, Exhibit, West Palm Beach, FL.
- 2019 Coral Springs Center for the Arts, Solo Exhibit, Coral Springs, FL.
- 2019 UNTITLED Art Fair, Exhibit, Miami Beach, FL.
- 2019 Studio Exhibit for benefit of the Virginia Museum of Fine Arts, Richmond, VA.
- 2020 Boca Raton Museum of Art, Exhibit, Boca Raton, FL.
- 2021 Flint Institute of Arts, Solo Exhibit, Flint, MI.
- 2021 Art in Public Places, Boca Raton Innovation Campus, Solo Exhibit, Boca Raton, FL.
- 2021 TW Fine Arts, Solo Exhibit, Palm Beach, FL.
- 2021 Ares Design, Solo Exhibit, Miami, FL. Solo Exhibit

== Permanent collections ==
- Coral Springs Center for the Arts, Coral Springs, FL.
- Tufts University Gallery, Medford, MA.
- Colorado Springs Fine Arts Center, Colorado Springs, CO.
- Samuel P. Harn Museum of Art, Gainesville, FL.
- Lawrence A. Moens Contemporary Art Collection, Palm Beach, FL.
- Georgia Museum of Art, Athens, GA.
- Boca Raton Museum of Art, Boca Raton, FL.
- Chip Ganassi Art Collection, Pittsburgh, PA.
- Flint Institute of Arts, Flint, MI.
- Danny Sullivan Art Collection
