= Maurice Carter (racing driver) =

Canadian racing driver (1924–2002)

Maurice "Mo" Carter (1924 – 28 March 2002, Pincher Creek, Alberta) was a Canadian racing driver from Winnipeg, Manitoba who was inducted into the Canadian Motorsport Hall of Fame in 1999.

Carter competed in the Trans-Am Series and IMSA in the 1970s and early 1980s. He placed fourth in the 1980 24 Hours of Daytona.
