= Kathy Rude =

American sports car driver (born 1957)

Kathy Rude (born 1957) is an American sports car driver who was one of the first female drivers to attract international attention. Growing up in Victoria, British Columbia, Canada, she began competing as a teenager in karting events. By her early 20s, after competing in Formula Ford and IMSA, she attracted the attention of several top-tier car owners. She was a member of the Mazda and the original North American Toyota factory-sponsored IMSA GT Championship teams. In February 1982, co-driving a factory-sponsored Mazda RX-7 with Allan Moffat and Lee Mueller, she earned a GTU class victory at the 24 Hours of Daytona. During an IMSA sports car event at Brainerd, Minnesota in July 1983, she suffered horrific injuries in a crash which ended her racing career. Noted sports car champion Brian Redman once referred to her as the only female driver he had encountered who posed a genuine threat to win major professional automobile races. She is now a corporate safe driving instructor and speaker.

From 1987 to 1994, Rude led safe driving and new car intros for Audi of America, Inc., driver clinics for Boeing employees through the Boeing Employees Automobile Club and did the initial instructor training for the then-new Audi Quattro Club.

Rude is also a breast cancer survivor including a stem cell transplant, trial drugs and radiation. Now doing well, she is married (since 1985) to Canadian sports-car racer and three-time Indianapolis 500 veteran Ludwig Heimrath Jr. living in western Washington State.

== See also ==
- IMSA GT Championship
