= Walt Bohren =

American race car driver

Walt Bohren (February 4, 1948 died February 8, 2011) was an American race car driver who won the IMSA GTU Championship in 1980.

Bohren was a long time racer in the International Motor Sports Association. His racing career began with motorcycles and he moved into cars driving Formula Fords. Bohren moved to IMSA racing and began a long association with Mazda. He drove a Mazda RX-2 to the RS championship in 1978. Bohren eventually graduated to the GTU division where he drove Mazda RX-7s. Driving for the Racing Beat team, Bohren won five races to claim the 1980 GTU championship. He also co-drove the GTU winning car at the 1981 12 Hours of Sebring. Bohren drove in the GTO division with limited success. He also competed at the 24 Hours of Le Mans in 1984, finishing 13th.

Bohren died in 2011 when he accidentally drowned near Tortola in the British Virgin Islands.
