= Mauricio de Narváez =

Colombian former racing driver (born 1941)

Mauricio de Narváez López (born 18 May 1941) is a Colombian former racing driver. He competed in the 24 Hours of Le Mans between 1981 and 1985 for Joest Racing, resulting fourth overall in 1983 driving a Porsche 956. He won the 1984 12 Hours of Sebring as an owner-driver in a Porsche 935, joined by Hans Heyer and Stefan Johansson.

De Narváez has been the president of the Colombian Touring & Automobile Club since 2013. He is also an executive in FIA and NACAM.
