= Snitzer =

Snitzer is a surname. Notable people with the surname include:

- Andy Snitzer (born 1962), American saxophonist, composer and arranger
- Herb Snitzer (1932–2022), American photographer
- James G. Snitzer (1925–1945), American actor
- Miriam Snitzer (1922–1933), American actress

== See also ==
- Schnitzer
