= Porsche 935 =

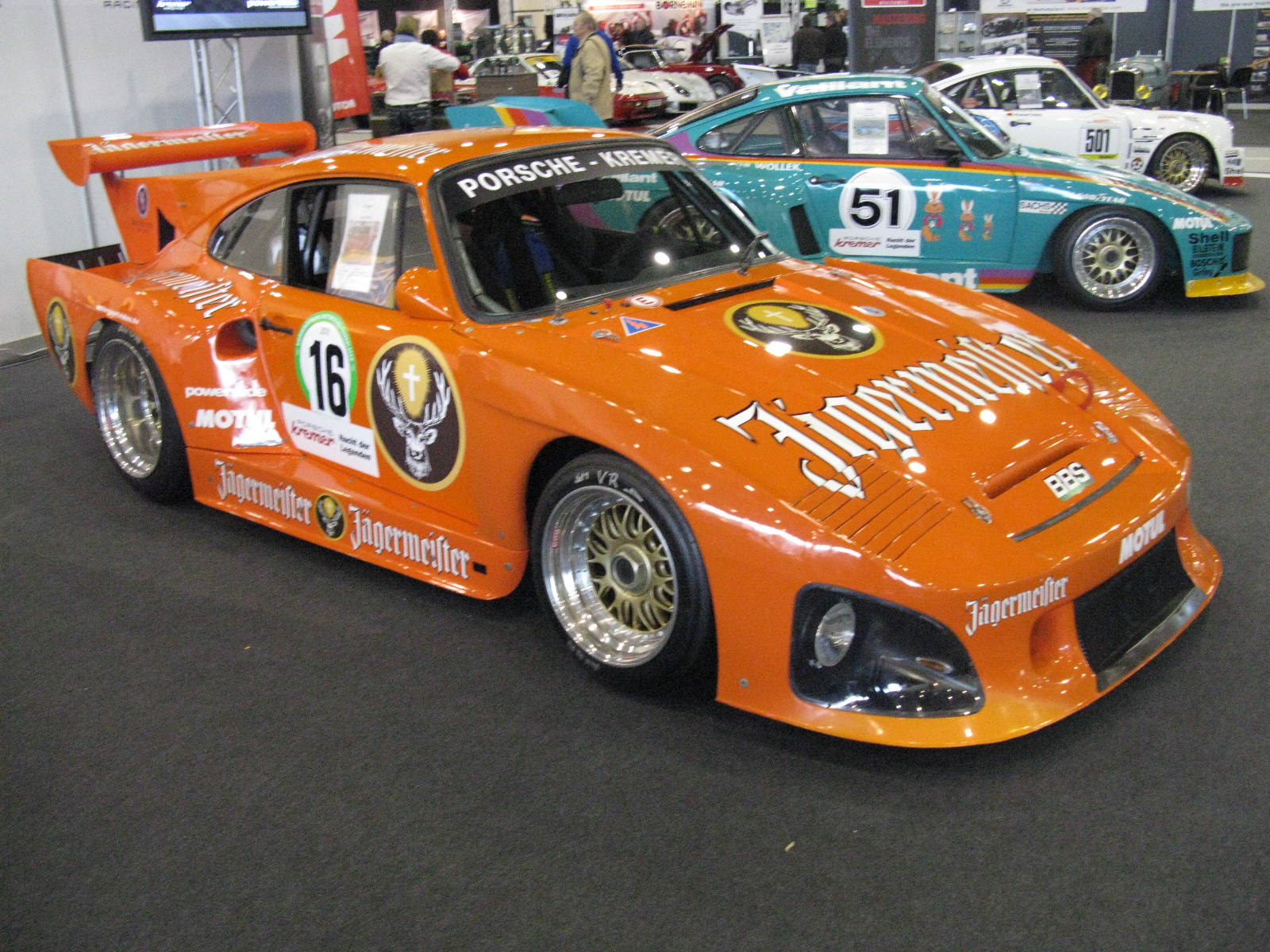
- Porsche 935 K3 in the "Jägermeister" livery for the DRM.

Overview
- Manufacturer: Porsche AG
- Production: 1976–1981
- Assembly: West Germany: Stuttgart-Zuffenhausen
- Designer: Norbert Singer

Body and chassis
- Class: Group 5 Special Production
- Body style: 2-door coupé
- Layout: Rear-engine, rear-wheel-drive
- Related: Porsche 934; Porsche 911 Turbo

Powertrain
- Engine: 2.8–3.3 L Type 935 twin-turbocharged Flat 6
- Transmission: 4-speed manual without differential

Dimensions
- Wheelbase: 2,271 mm (89.4 in); 2,279 mm (89.7 in) (935/78)
- Length: 4,820 mm (189.8 in); 4,890 mm (192.5 in) (935/78)
- Width: 1,985 mm (78.1 in); 1,990 mm (78.3 in) (935/78)
- Height: 1,150 mm (45.3 in); 1,200 mm (47.2 in) (935/78)
- Curb weight: 970 kg (2,138 lb) minimum required by rules

Chronology
- Predecessor: Porsche Carrera RSR (1974)
- Successor: Porsche 961

The Porsche 935 is a race car that was developed and manufactured by German automaker Porsche. Introduced in 1976 as the factory racing version of the 911 (930) Turbo and prepared for FIA-Group 5 rules, it was an evolution of the Carrera RSR 2.1 turbo prototype, the second place overall finisher in the 1974 24 Hours of Le Mans.

Beginning with the 1977 season, Porsche offered the 935 to customers entering the World Championship for Makes, in the IMSA GT Championship and in the German Deutsche Rennsport Meisterschaft (DRM). The 935 went on to win the 1979 24 Hours of Le Mans overall, and other major endurance races, including Sebring, Daytona, and the 1,000 km Nürburgring. Of the 370 races it was entered, it won 123.

Usually, no other make could challenge the 935, as other manufacturers did not supply customer cars as Porsche did. Each race, at the time, typically featured at least five 935s. The 935 used a 3.3L Type 935 twin-turbocharged flat-six engine which used a mechanical fuel injection system. All of the high performance components combined enabled the engine to have a power output up to 630 kW (845 hp; 857 PS), the engine often suffered turbo lag at low RPM due to the large turbochargers. The dominance of the 935 ended with changes in the FIA rules which came into effect in 1982, replacing the six numbered groups with only three groups, namely A, B and C.

The second generation of the 935 started a limited-production of just 77 units, with customer deliveries in June 2019.

== 935/76 ==
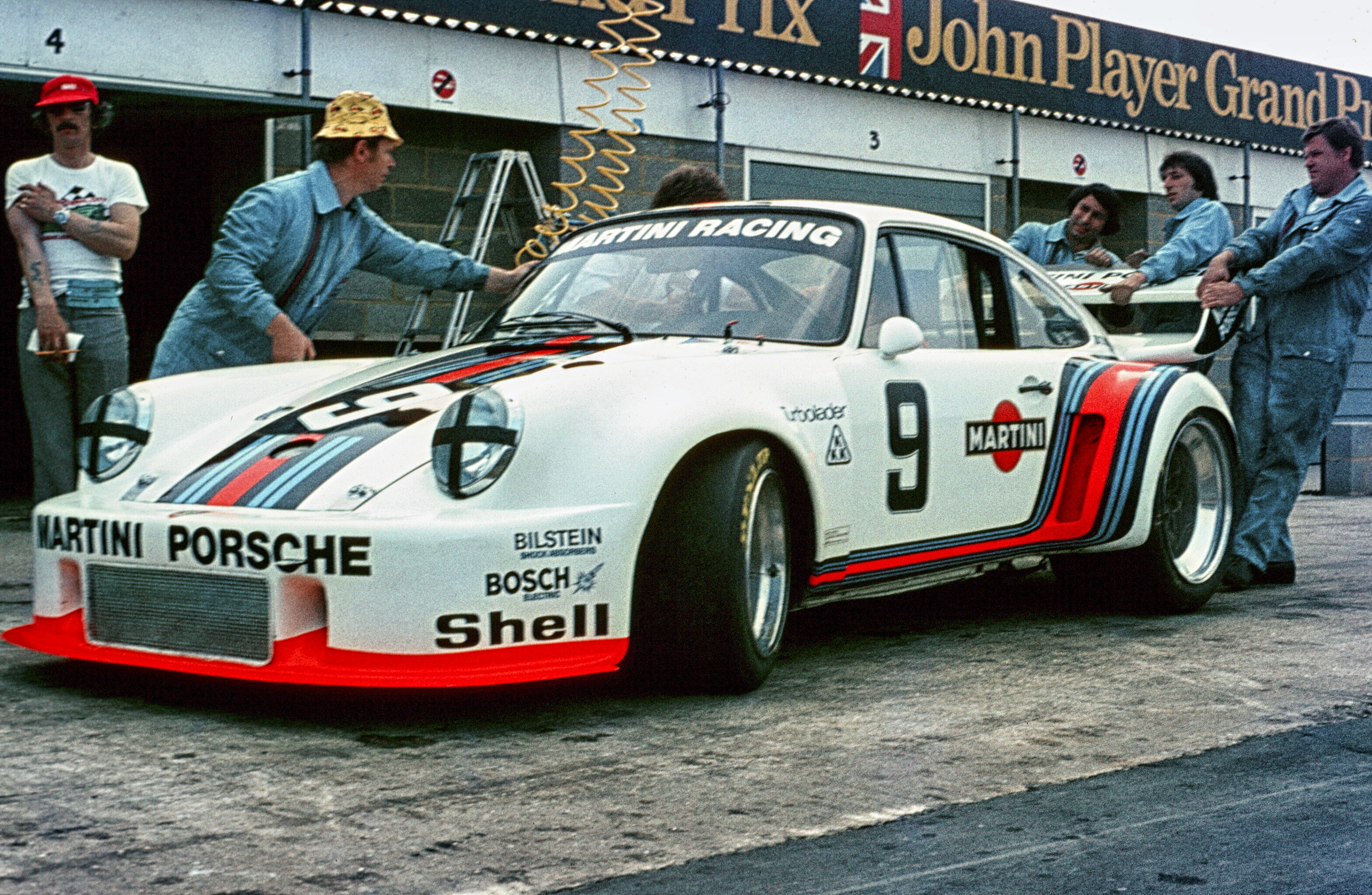
An early 935 at Silverstone 6 Hours in 1976 before receiving the slant nose treatment.

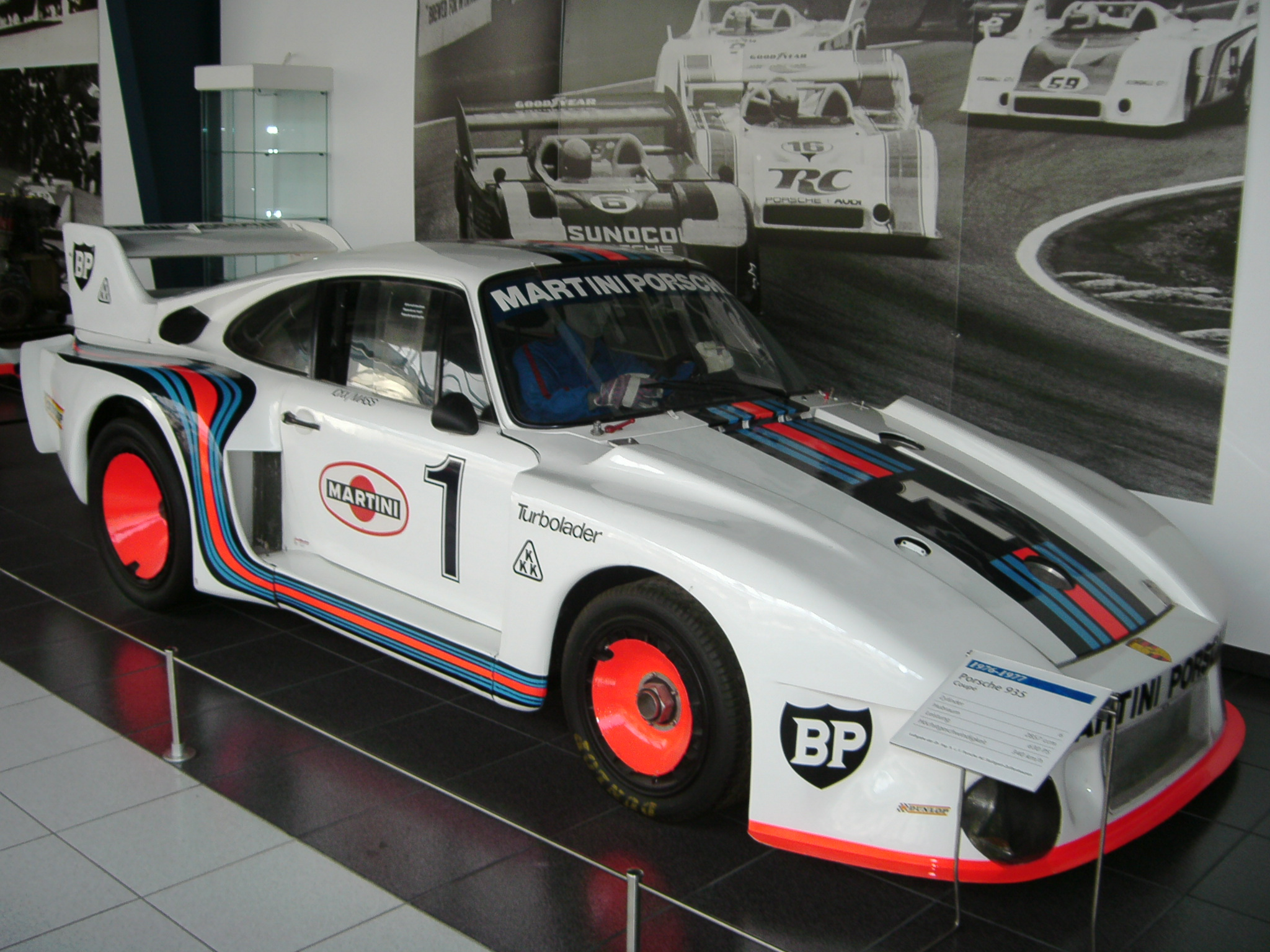
Porsche 935/77

For 1976, endurance racing had two world championships: the 1976 FIA World Championship for Makes for Group 5 special production cars, and the 1976 World Sportscar Championship season for Group 6 prototypes up to 3.0 L. Accordingly, the 935 and the new Porsche 936 were the two-pronged Porsche effort for 1976 which was sponsored by Martini Racing, which had already supported Porsche 917 or 908 entries in 1970 and 1971, like the 1971 Le Mans winner.

Each championship had seven races, with only Dijon hosting both on the same weekend, while on two other weekends, the races were even run in different countries, which forced Porsche to divide its resources. Jacky Ickx and Jochen Mass were the main drivers, when the F1 schedule permitted. Rolf Stommelen, who was recovering from his bad crash in the 1975 Spanish GP, was the backup, along with Manfred Schurti.

Under Group 5 rules, also known as "silhouette rules", several significant modifications were allowed (including bodywork modifications, larger wings, wider axles and water cooling), provided that the basic silhouette of the car remain unchanged when viewed from the front. The 935's engine was a 418 kW (568 PS; 561 hp) (at 7,900 rpm) version of the regular 3.0 L flat-six, with 60 mkp (438lb-ft, 588Nm) torque at 5,400 rpm. Boost was between 1.35 and 1.55 and fuel consumption was 52 litre per 100 km. Capacity was reduced to 2.85 L, and with the turbo charging penalty factor of 1.4, it fit into the 4.0 L class which had a prescribed minimum weight of only 970 kg (2,140 lb). Porsche, having a lot of experience with lightweight cars, had managed to get the Carrera RSR prototype to under 800 kg. The empty 935 tipped the scales at 900 kg, and weight distribution could be balanced with an additional 70 kg. Preseason testing at the fast Paul Ricard circuit showed a top speed of 183 mph (295 km/h).

In addition to the naturally aspirated 340 hp (250 kW) Carrera RSR introduced in 1974, Porsche offered a customer racing version of the 911 Turbo prepared for the more standard Group 4 rules, the 485 hp (362 kW) Porsche 934. Some customer teams modified their 934s to Group 5 rules with body kits supplied by Porsche, these were often designated 934/5. Cologne-based Kremer Racing entered a 935 K1 built on a factory shell which in the first race, the six-hour Mugello, finished second behind the Martini Racing sponsored factory entry of Mass and Ickx. Porsches occupied the first seven places ahead of a BMW in eighth, which according to the points scheme meant that Porsche had now twenty points, and BMW three. The factory 935 also scored the pole, fastest lap and win at the six-hour Vallelunga, where a BMW was second and the best 934 finished fifth.

After the second race, the CSI rule makers insisted that the "whale tail" hood of the road-going 930 must fit on the race car. The air-to-air intercooler setup under the rear hood had to be altered to a more compact air-to-water layout, which cost Porsche several weeks of testing and half a million Deutsche marks.

The hastily modified 935 again won the pole and fastest lap at the six-hour Silverstone, but due to a clutch problem at the start, the Martini car could finish only tenth, with the second-placed Kremer 935 collecting valuable points for Zuffenhausen. A private BMW 3.5 CSL had beaten it to the finish by a second. Even more worrisome to Porsche was that BMW Motorsport had also entered a turbo, a 3.2 CSL driven by Ronnie Peterson and Gunnar Nilsson. That new BMW had qualified only one second behind the factory 935, but two seconds ahead of the third placed Kremer 935. The powerful BMW did not last long in the race, however, due to gearbox problems.

Initially, Porsche ran the 935 with the 911's original fender-mounted headlights, in two different guises: a sprint version with a wider version of its wheel arches, and a high speed version with modified aerodynamics. The sprint setup was rarely used. However, after carefully studying the rulebooks, Porsche engineers, namely Norbert Singer, discovered a loophole regarding the modifications of fenders that gave them the liberty to remove the headlights to reduce drag and create more downforce, to which the venting slits contribute. This "flat nose" (also known as the "slant nose") with headlights in the front spoiler, became the distinguishing feature of the 935 and was later offered on the roadgoing 930 as the flachbau, or "flatnose", part of Porsche's sonderwunsch, or "special wish" program. Also, the 935 now had extended "long tail" rear fenders, similar to the low drag setup seen years earlier on the Carrera RS. These fenders also offered more space for engine periphery and efficient cooling.

The 1,000 km Nürburgring, usually consisting of 44 laps, was run in 1976 as a 47 lap 1,073 km race, putting even more strain on the new Group 5 machinery. With Mass and Ickx being at the 1976 Monaco Grand Prix, Rolf Stommelen and Manfred Schurti stepped in to drive the 935 which by now had the new look it became famous for. With the help of higher turbo boost, Stommelen qualified the 935 on the pole with a stunning 7:37.5 (see List of Nordschleife lap times (racing)), while the BMW turbo did not take part. The fastest of only nine race laps was just over eight minutes, though, as the engine was not sorted out, and vibrations caused ignition failure. Again, a reliable Schnitzer Motorsport-entered naturally aspirated BMW CSL took the win, with the customer 934 of Loos salvaging valuable second place points for Porsche.

The 1976 24 Hours of Le Mans counted towards neither world championship, but Le Mans was often considered the real championship. For that race, it was possible to use the 935's well-tested original engine setup. The main battle was between the sportscars, with a Renault Alpine setting the pole. The 935 driven by Stommelen and Schurti qualified third and, despite the weight and drag of a Group 5 silhouette, finished fourth overall, with one of the Porsche 936s taking the win.

At Zeltweg, Ickx was back, setting the pole, but the throttle link broke before mid-race. Derek Bell set the fastest lap in the Kremer 935, but nonetheless two BMW coupés won ahead of a private 934. Porsche still had a narrow lead in the points standings, but only the best five of the seven events would count. BMW had now three wins compared to Porsche's two, which meant that Porsche had to win the final two races. The new engine setup was tested at Weissach in a modified 934 while the race cars were shipped overseas. At Watkins Glen, the regular race chassis 002 of Mass and Ickx needed modification to the brakes derived from the brakes of the 917, and the test chassis 001 of Stommelen and Schurti won, with the best BMW being fourth. Porsche now had three wins and two seconds equaling ninety points, which meant that only another win could add five more points to their tally. BMW had also three wins, but only one second and a fourth, equaling 85 points. Without a competitive third brand, the winner of the final round would take the world championship.

In Dijon, the turbo of BMW Motorsport was back, now with the 3.5 L CSL, and this time the fast Swedes Peterson and Nilsson put it on the pole, half a second ahead of Ickx. Again the transmission was not as strong as the Bavarian Motor Works 750 hp engine, failing before the first of the six hours had passed. Three 935s plus two Group 5 spec 934/5s won ahead of the best normally aspirated BMW. The 935 and 936 had each won its championship, and Le Mans, too. The age of turbocharged engines had begun in endurance racing.

== 935/77 ==
=== 935/77A customer ===
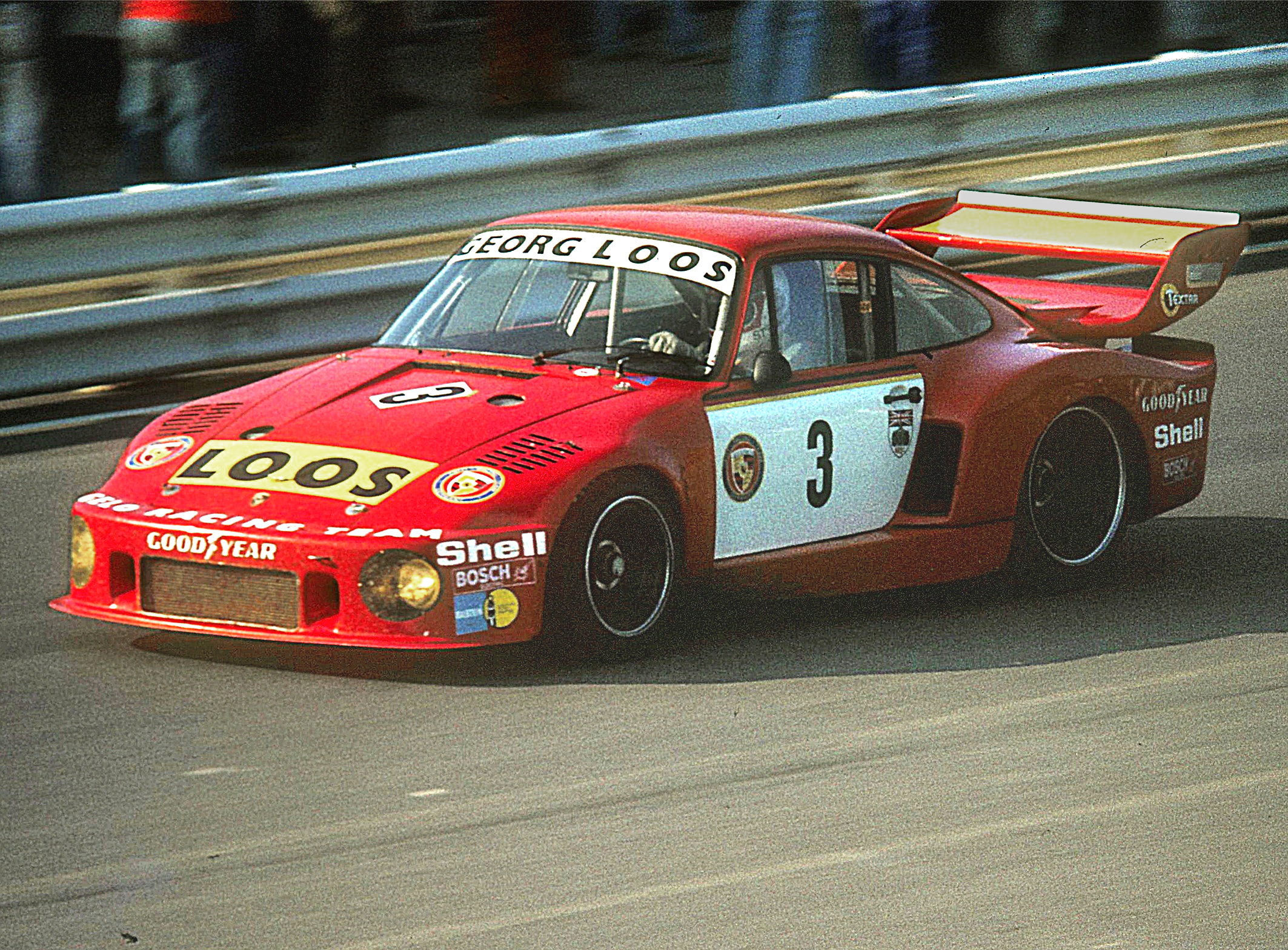
The 935/77A of Georg Loos driven by Rolf Stommelen in the 1977 1000km Nürburgring

Based on the 1976 version, thirteen Porsche 935/77A were sold to privateer teams in Australia, Italy, France, the US and Germany. Among others, Cologne-based rivals Georg Loos and Kremer Racing entered 935s in the 1977 Deutsche Rennsport Meisterschaft which introduced the Group 5 rules. As the naturally aspirated BMW Coupés and Ford Capri had pulled out of the Div. I (over 2.0 litre) of the DRM, these Porsches had no serious competition in the big division until other turbo-charged cars like the BMW-powered Schnitzer, Toyota Celica and the Zakspeed Ford Capri debuted.

The DRM was a drivers' championship, and with equal Porsche customer cars, no other competitor could dominate, which meant that despite the customer 934 of 1976 and the 935 since 1977 dominating their division, the championship was often decided in favour of a small division pilot. Kremer went on to develop yet another special 935, the K2, and also ran the optional 3.0L engine offered by Porsche, which was connected with sixty kg more minimum weight.

Porsche also sold slightly modified customer cars in 1978 and 1979.

=== 935/77 works ===
After having won both world championships in 1976, Porsche focused on Le Mans. Due to a lack of competition in 1976, Porsche decided not to defend its sportscar championship with the 936 in 1977, leaving it to the Alfa Romeo Tipo 33. The series would be demoted to a European series in 1978 before being discontinued.

In the 1977 World Championship for Makes season, the factory continued to develop and race one or two new 935s in case BMW or another brand would bring a competitive turbocharged car. Customers of the 935/77A were not happy that the factory would race them with a newer car, but as it was, the 935/77 proved somewhat unreliable: the works car won only four of the nine WCM events, not including Le Mans.

In the WCM season opening 24 hour Daytona, the old car was entered, but tyre failures caused a DNF, with an older RSR 3.0 taking the win in front of two customer 935's. The new car body was changed significantly to lower drag, resulting in a 10 km/h higher top speed at Paul Ricard, where it covered 3,500 km in tests at speed, lapping three to four seconds faster. The front fenders, which in 1976 had followed the hood, now protruded above the hood line, and also accommodated mirrors. The rear fenders were altered, but the biggest change was the addition of a second rear window above the standard one. This allowed cleaner air flow to the rear wing under which the single turbo was later replaced by two KKK units. This improved throttle response and also power, but several head gasket failures meant that Porsche had some homework to do for the1978 season of the World Champion chip of Makes(WCM).

The works 935/77 qualified sixth at the 1977 24 Hours of Le Mans, behind the Renault Alpines and the 936s, but engine troubles ended their race early. As in 1976, a 936 won after the turbo-powered sportscars chased each other into trouble. This time, a customer 935 finished third overall.

=== 935/77 2.0 ===
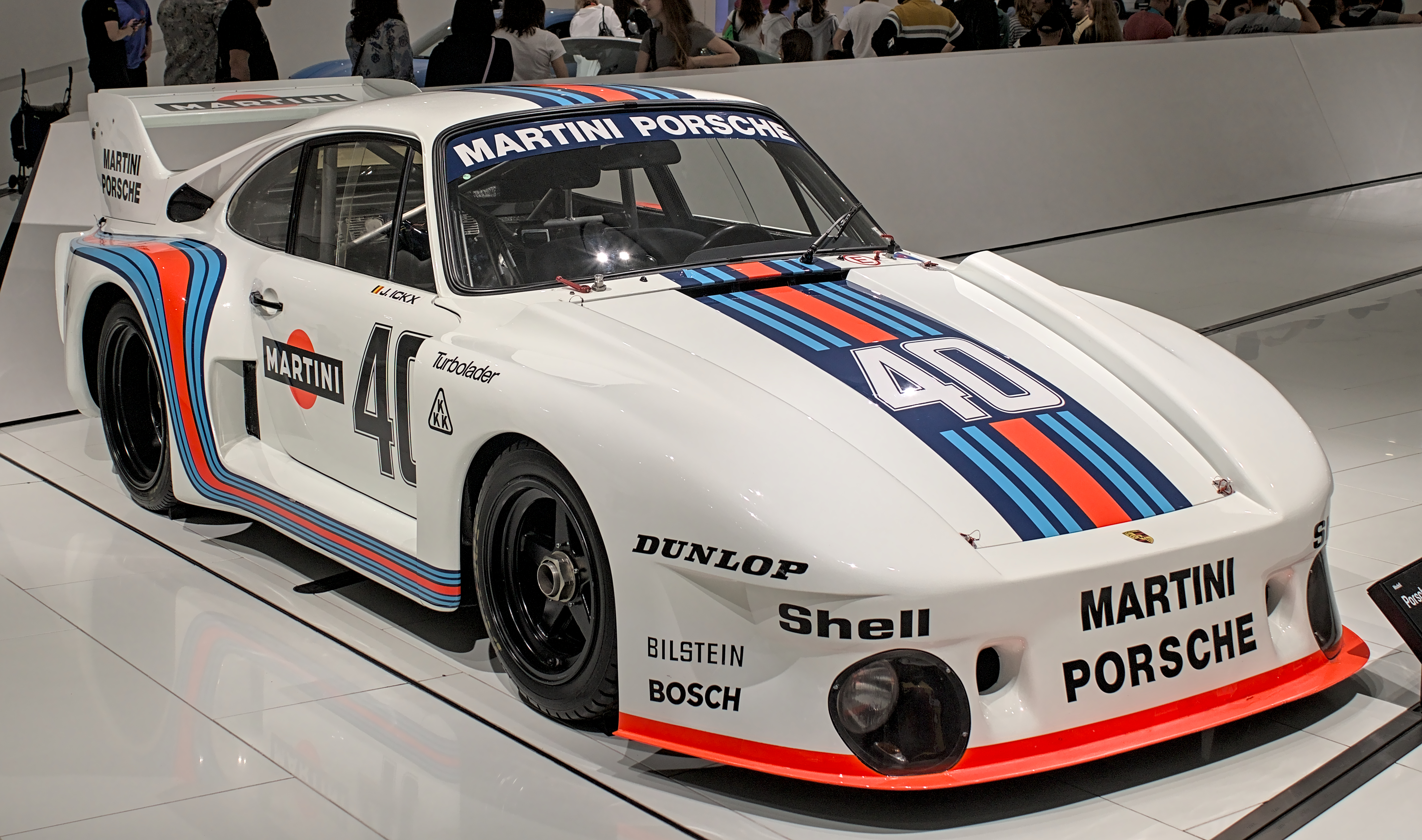
1977 factory 935 known as Baby due to the smaller 1.4-litre turbocharged engine (the car is in the famous "Martini" livery).

The 935/77 body style was used also for winning one race in the small 2.0 litre Div. II of the DRM (predecessor to the DTM), to prove that Porsche could also compete in that class. In Div. I, the customer 935s raced each other, and German TV announced that at the Norisring, it would thus cover only the Div. II race. Porsche engineers were sent to the drawing boards to reduce the capacity of the air-cooled flat-six to 1,425 cc. The power output of the engine was 261 kW (355 PS; 350 hp). The weight could be lowered to 750 kg (1,650 lb) according to rules in this class. To achieve this, large parts of the chassis were replaced by a tubular aluminium space frame.

At the time, Zakspeed-Ford and Schnitzer-BMW were in transition from the naturally aspirated 2.0 L 4-cylinder engine rated at about 224 kW (305 PS; 300 hp) to 1.4 litre turbocharged engines rated at an excess of 261 kW (355 PS; 350 hp). These engines would later move on to Formula One, with the BMW powerplant winning the 1983 F1 Championship, and becoming the strongest F1 engine ever, producing up to 1,500 hp (1,119 kW; 1,521 PS) in qualifying trim.

In the first outing at Norisring in early July 1977, both the new car with Jacky Ickx behind the wheel had problems due to overheating. Skipping the Diepholz airfield round, Porsche sorted the car out for the DRM support race of the 1977 German Grand Prix at the fast Hockenheimring (long version). In changing weather conditions, Jacky Ickx set pole by almost three seconds and won with 50 seconds, setting fastest lap in the process. With its mission accomplished, the Porsche 935/77 2.0 (chassis 935/2-001) was retired to the Porsche Museum.

=== 935 L1 ===
Following the factory effort of the 935/77, Porsche privateer Jan Lundgardh wanted to enter the 935/77 in the Deutsche Rennsport Meisterschaft and World Sportscar Championship, but Porsche was reluctant to provide him with a factory 935/77 chassis. Lundgardh with the help of Porsche engineer Eberhard Braun managed to procure an original 1.4 L (85.4 cu in) engine from the 935/77 project which produced 370 bhp (276 kW; 375 PS). Unlike the factory 935/77 which had a center monocoque with front and rear tubular frames, Lundgardh constructed an entire spaceframe chassis, which was more akin to the setup found on the 935/78 "Moby Dick". The windshield was borrowed from a 911 Turbo, and retained much of the body of a factory 935, however towards the end of its debut season in 1980, it was eventually fitted with bodywork from the K3 developed by Kremer. For the 1981 season, the L1 was driven in the World Sportscar Championship by Lundgardh alongside Mike Wilds. Since the L1 was competing in the under-2.0 liter class, at scrutineering for the 24 Hours of Le Mans it weighed 817 kg (1,801 lb), and marked the first time a "Baby" 935 had competed at Le Mans. Reliability problems plagued the car throughout its earlier seasons, Le Mans proving no exception as the L1 retired in the 5th hour with engine failure. Eventually the original engine was replaced by a 930/76 3 L (183.1 cu in) flat-six, and Lundgardh continued to campaign the car in the GTX class of the World Sportscar Championship, finishing an all-time high of 1st in class at its penultimate outing, the 1984 1000 km of Nürburgring.

== 935/78 "Moby Dick" ==
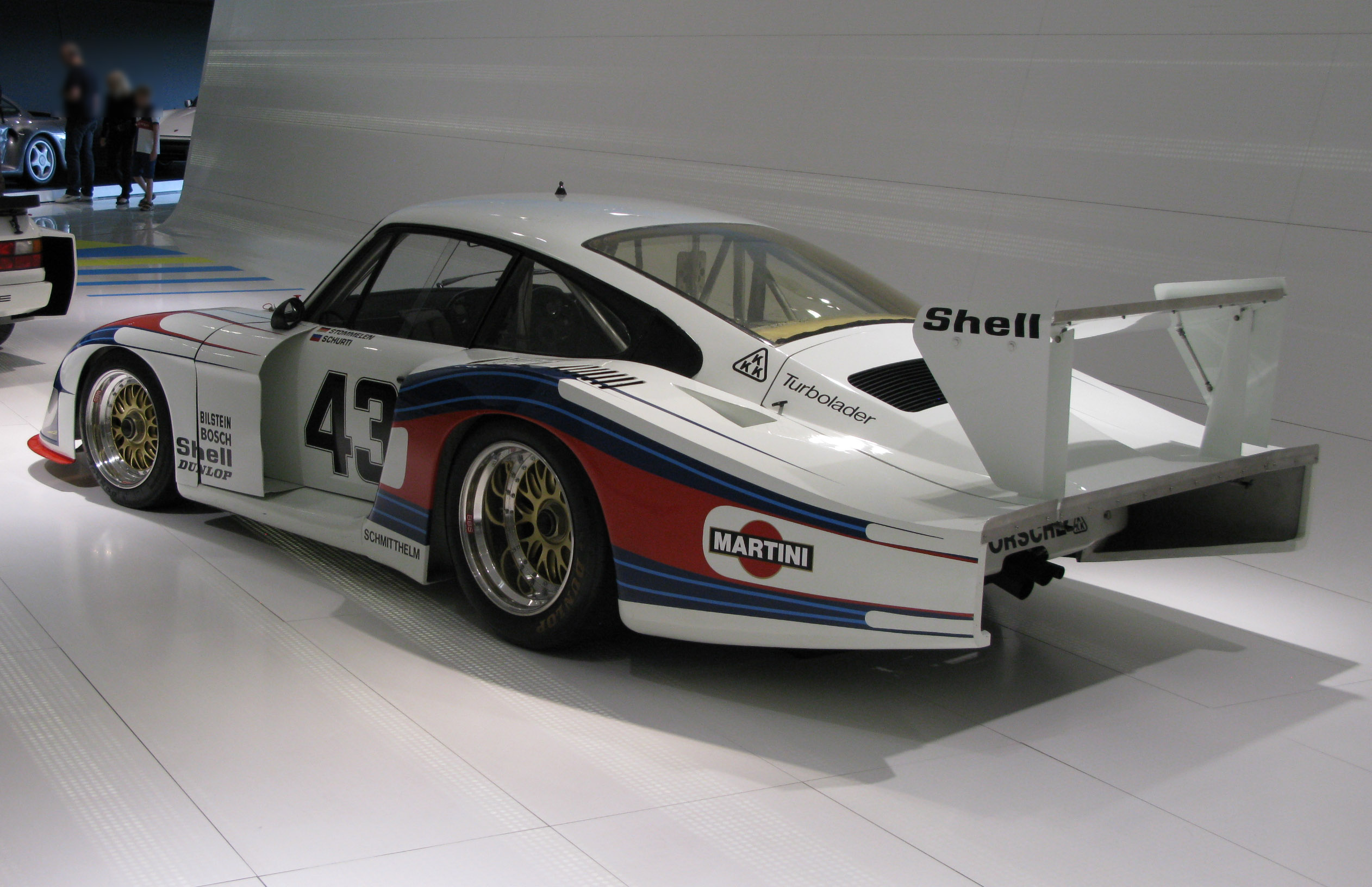
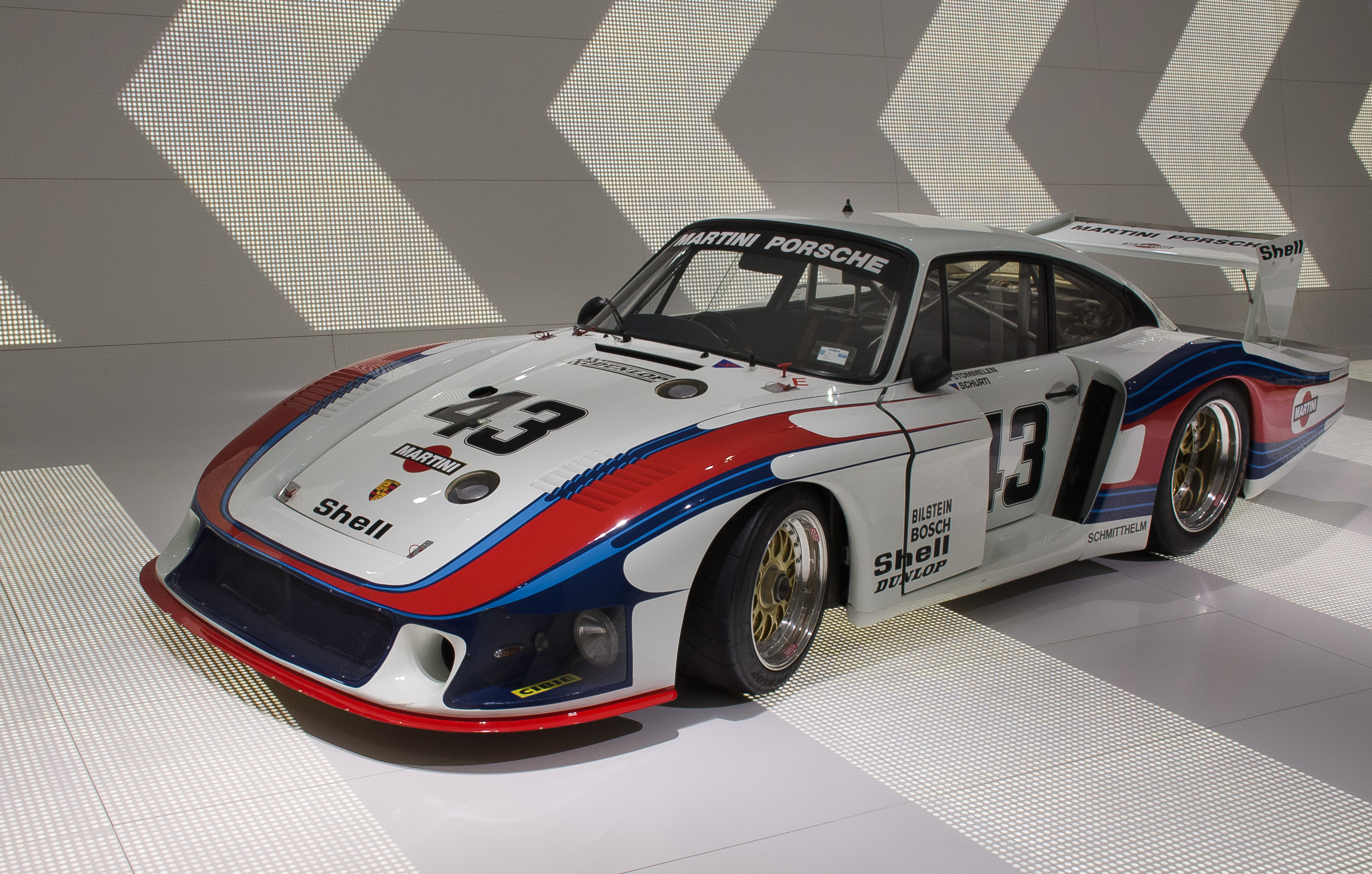
Porsche 935/78 "Moby Dick" on static display

For 1978, a third and final version of the 935 was developed, the 935/78, intended only for Le Mans. Due to the head gasket failures of the 1977 version, Porsche parted with their air cooling tradition and introduced water-cooled cylinder heads in the 1978 engine, and equipped them with four valves as well. The capacity was enlarged to 3.2 L, increasing its output to 559–634 kW (760–862 PS; 750–850 hp). The weight, which was less important on the Le Mans straights, had to be 1,030 kg now. As this track, like most, was run clockwise, the driver seat was moved over to the right side for better weight distribution and sight in right-hand corners, like Dunlop, Tertre Rouge and Mulsanne, another distinctive feature of the 1978 model.

The new car again took full advantage of a new loophole in the Group 5 rules, of which BMW took advantage of and cut the floor pan of their car to mount the exhaust system at the front of the engine. Keeping this fact in view, the whole floor pan of the 935 was cut away, and the body was lowered by 10 cm (3.9 in). The gearbox was mounted upside down to reduce the angle of the drive shafts. As the rules did not limit the forward extension of the rear aerodynamic devices, Porsche even added fairings to the doors, bridging the gap between the front and rear fenders. These were shortened later, covering only the front third of the doors. Because of its white color and long tail shape optimised for low drag, the 935/78 was often nicknamed Moby-Dick.

With this version, the pair of Mass/Ickx won the test race, the 6 hours of Silverstone Circuit, the pole (1:22,38) and fastest lap (1:23,98 or 202,519 km/h), being only 4 seconds slower than the corresponding times of James Hunt in the 1977 British Grand Prix, which covered only a quarter of the distance.

At the 1978 24 Hours of Le Mans, the 935 qualified third, barely beaten by a Renault Alpine and a 936. Compared to 1976, lap times were 15 seconds quicker now. With the new 3.2 L engine, it was the fastest car on the straight in Le Mans, recording a top speed of 367 km/h (228 mph), passing the prototypes of Renault Alpine, as well as the teammate 936, as these Group 6 cars had 2.1 L engines with just over 373 kW (507 PS; 500 hp), equal to normal 3.0 L engines. The engine had to be replaced before the race, though, and with ensuing problems early in the race, the Moby Dick was no contender, finishing 8th behind three customer 935. In its third attempt, Renault finally managed to beat Porsche, and then went on to focus on F1. Two of the three 936 and another Alpine occupied the other three places. Before being retired to the museum, the Moby Dick was also entered at Vallelunga and at the Norisring, the annual highlight of the DRM series, but the twisty track around the Nuremberg Reichsparteitag grand stand proved to be quite difficult for the Moby Dick, and it failed to finish.

Awaiting rule changes taking effect in 1982, Porsche did not officially enter in 1979 or 1980, granting only some limited support to customer efforts with the 935, 936 and even decade-old 908 and 917, mainly in form of spare parts, engines and know-how, which by then was rather dated. Factory racing was mainly done with the 924 turbo variants called the Carrera GT, with limited success.

Private non-factory-built replica cars of the 1977 body style and the "Moby Dick" were entered in DRM and IMSA in following years by Joest Racing, Moretti racing and John Fitzpatrick Racing.

== Kremer 935 K2, K3 and K4 ==
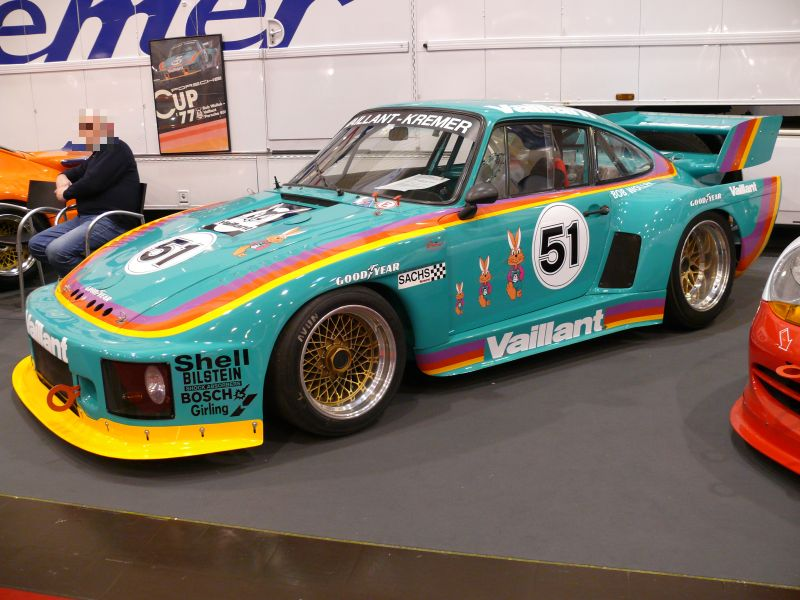
Kremer 935 K2 of Bob Wollek, an improved version of the 935/77A

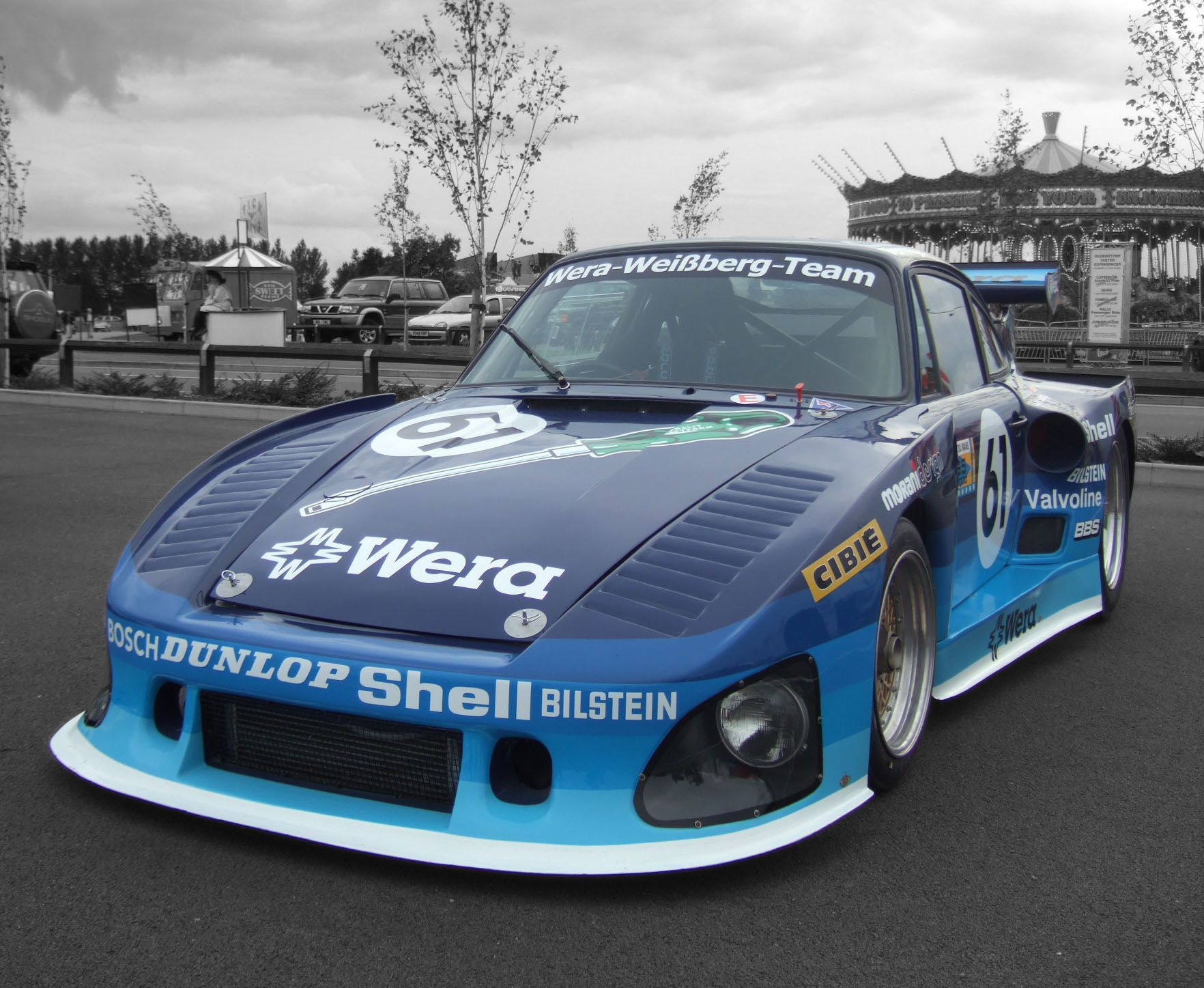
1981 Wera Weissberg Team Porsche Kremer 935 K3

As Porsche hesitated to sell their Evolution models, some teams developed their own ideas, especially Kremer Racing from Cologne, Germany. Parallel to the factory in 1976, they had built a 935 K1, and in 1977, modified their customer 935 to the K2. For 1979, they introduced the 935 K3 (for "Kremer Type 3"; the derivative of the successful K2). Driven mainly by Klaus Ludwig, it won the 24 Hours of Le Mans in 1979, beating all prototypes, in heavy rain, which is usually considered a disadvantage for race cars with windshields. Coming in second was a factory spec model, driven by Rolf Stommelen, and supported by team owner Dick Barbour and actor Paul Newman.

A total of 13 complete K3 cars were built by Kremer Racing. Kits were also made available to allow other 935s to be updated to K3 specification.

Facing strong competition in the 1980 DRM by the Zakspeed Ford Capri, the K4 was introduced in mid-1981 for customers at a cost of 400,000 Deutsche Mark. The K4 used a Porsche supplied 3.1 L twin-turbocharged Flat six engine with a varying power output of 559 to 596 kW (760 to 810 PS; 750 to 799 hp) at 1.5 bar boost costing 91,000 DM.

A 935 K2 was converted to street legal specification and features identical to the 935/78 "Moby Dick". The 1986 K2 is one of only twelve examples imported into the U.S. Originally purchased by the owner of Golds Gym in 1986 from Auto Saloon 2000 in Miami for nearly US$200,000, the unrestored car has been untouched since 1988 when he was indicted for the distribution of illegal drugs. The specific Kremer K2 was auctioned off at Mecum Monterey Auction 2015 for an unknown amount.

== Success and legacy ==
Through 1984 the 935 won over 150 races worldwide, including more than 20 class wins. It scored an overall win in the 1979 24 Hours of Le Mans making it one of only 2 cars since 1953 to win at Le Mans overall yet not be in the top prototype class. It also won the 24 Hours of Daytona and the 12 Hours of Sebring six times each. It was also undefeated in the German DRM between 1977 and 1979, posted victories in the IMSA GTX class, and won many races on the famous Nürburgring Nordschleife, including three 1000km Nürburgring. The 935 also took Porsche to victory in the FIA World Championship for Makes each year from 1976 to 1979. In 1980 and 1981, Lancia won the title with their Beta Montecarlo 1.4t, by regularly winning the sub 2.0 L category, and occasionally defeating Porsche in the big category.

In 1982 Alan Jones, the 1980 Formula One World Champion, drove a 935 to victory in the 1982 Australian GT Championship. Jones was unbeaten for the whole season. The 1983 Australian GT Championship was won by the same 935 which Jones drove to the 1982 title, this time in the hands of touring car driver Rusty French. As a reward for his win in the 1983 championship, French was given a drive with Kremer Racing at the 1984 24 Hours of Le Mans where he finished 9th outright with Tiff Needell and David Sutherland in a 956. At the end of the year in the Sports Car/GT Challenge support races for the 1983 Australian Grand Prix, Jones, driving a 935 K4 imported to Australia from America by John Fitzpatrick racing especially for the meeting, easily won both 15 lap races. Italian driver Gianpiero Moretti, founder of Momo Wheels, finished 4th in each race driving the Moby Dick version of the 935.

The Moby Dick engine was the basis for an all-watercooled 2.65 L engine intended for the Indy 500, but rule makers there, remembering the dominance of the Porsche 917/10 turbo and 935, limited its boost so it would not be competitive against domestic machinery. Instead, the engine was used in the 1981 Le Mans winning 936/81, and in the 956 and 962C which would dominate the mid-1980s. Starting in 1999, this engine block forms the basis of the successful motorsport GT, and Turbo models before being phased out completely in the 991 generation 911.

After Group 5 was discontinued by FIA after 1982, the 935 continued to race in IMSA's GTP category, usually entered by smaller privateer names, who were not permitted by IMSA regulations to race the new Group C 956 because of the footbox location relative to the front axle (footbox was ahead, in violation of the IMSA rule where it must be behind the front axle). Due to this, the 962 was introduced to the US market in 1984, fitted with the 935 air-cooled single-turbo engine. With the appearance of GTP cars in 1981, the 935 was still competitive through 1983. Later in 1984 the 962 appeared and wrote another history. By 1985 the days of the 935 were mostly over, as it could hardly be modified to a groundeffect design even with a tube frame chassis, with the rear-mounted flat 6 prohibiting a diffuser, an issue which also affects modern 911 race cars. Only a handful of 935's remained, and the car was no longer competitive with the already developed GTP cars. The last major victory for the 935 was in the 1984 12 Hours of Sebring in the IMSA GTP class against purpose built prototypes. The 935 was seen in two races in the 1986 season. The 935 can still be seen on the track throughout North America and Europe in historic racing and hill climbs.

The four-wheel-drive 959, and its racing counterpart 961, can be considered high-tech successors to the 935, but Group B never got a circuit racing series, and was only used in rallying before being banned there due to a fatal accident. The 1980s had few racing opportunities for turbocharged 911 cars, which often were fitted with 935-style bodywork. Being run by amateurs at the Nürburgring in VLN endurance and in the 24 hours race, they were often banned, or at least slowed down by rules.

The 1990s 911 GT2 based on the 993 is also considered a successor to the 935, but BPR series and FIA GT rules required a higher weight, and intake restrictors limited power to 410 kW (557 PS; 550 hp), less than the first 935/76. The 911 GT1 with its mid-engine and lowered roof has a different concept, though. Starting in 2003, the turbo-charged Porsche 996 of Alzen set new records at the Nürburgring VLN endurance series (see List of Nordschleife lap times (racing)), with speeds reminding of the 935 era, despite it being also slowed down by minimum weight (1,350 kg) and limited boost.

The Porsche 935 is still raced in championships alongside more modern cars, such as the GT Cup Championship, in which Richard Chamberlain pilots a replica 935 for CTR Developments in the GTO class, which utilises a Porsche 962 engine on a 911E chassis.

== 2019 Tribute 935 Model ==
In September 2018 at Rennsport Reunion VI in Laguna Seca. Porsche unveiled its 935 tribute as part of its 70th anniversary celebration. Based on 991 GT2 RS chassis. Only 77 examples will be built and sold for ~$750,000.

All are track-only, non-homologated, and come with a single Recaro racing seat with bare carbon-fiber bodywork resembling the 935/78, as a tribute to the 935/78. The LED taillights are shared with the 919 Hybrid LMP1 racer, side mirrors from the 911 RSR and titanium tailpipes hearkening back to the 1968 908/01. The car has a gearshift lever with laminated wood design, a carbon fibre steering wheel and the colour display from the 2019 911 GT3 R, a safety cage, a racing bucket seat with a six-point safety harness, optional $13k second seat for the passenger, air conditioning, 6-piston aluminium monobloc racing front calipers with 380 mm (15.0 in) disc brakes, 4-piston rear calipers with 355 mm (14.0 in) disc brakes, Porsche Stability Management (PSM) with traction control as well as an anti-lock braking system. It is powered by the same 515 kW (700 PS; 691 hp) engine as used in the GT2 RS mated to a seven-speed PDK transmission.

The 935 also raced in the Goodwood Festival of Speed 2019.

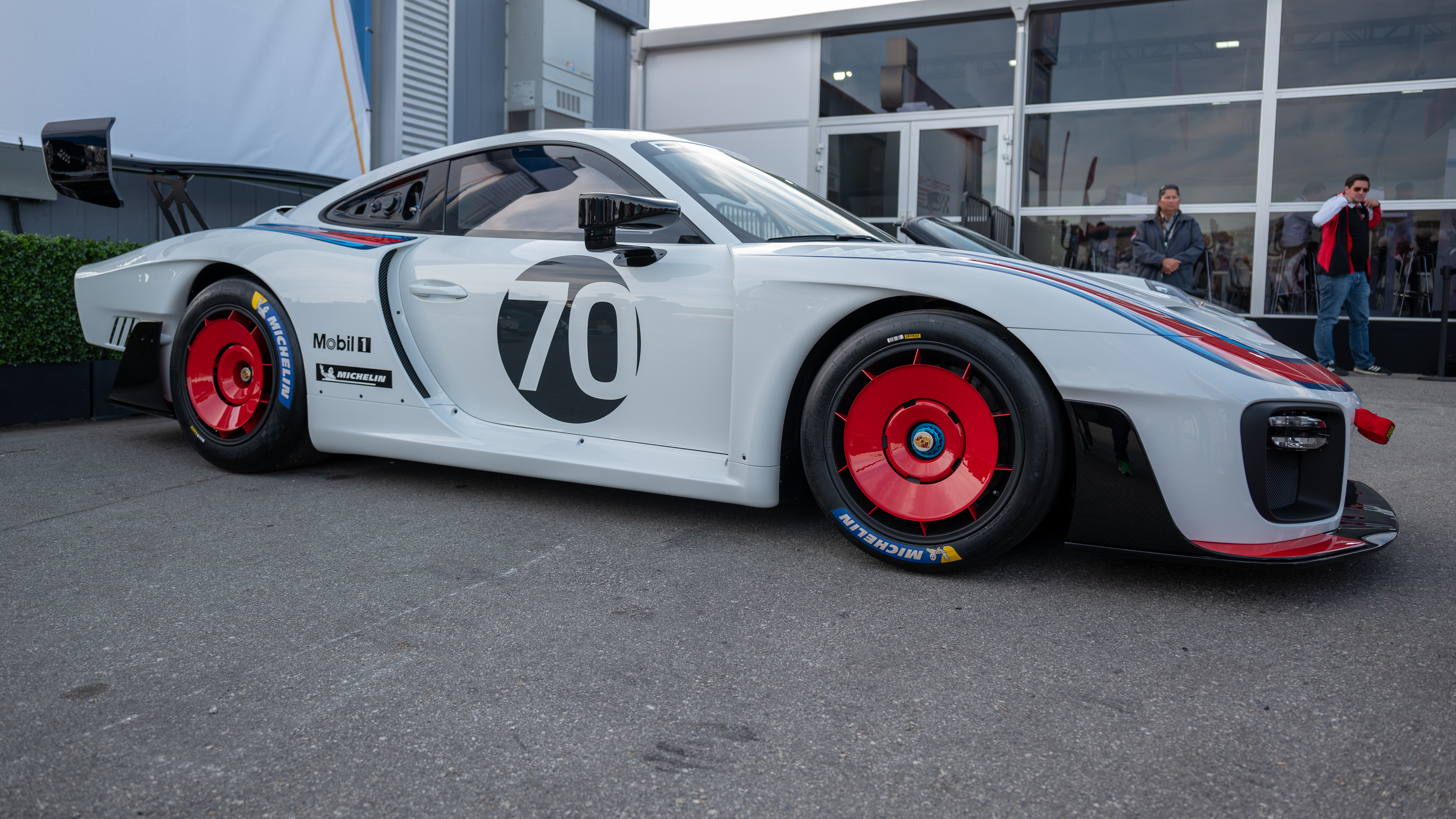
Porsche 935 at Rennsport Reunion VI at Laguna Seca in 2018

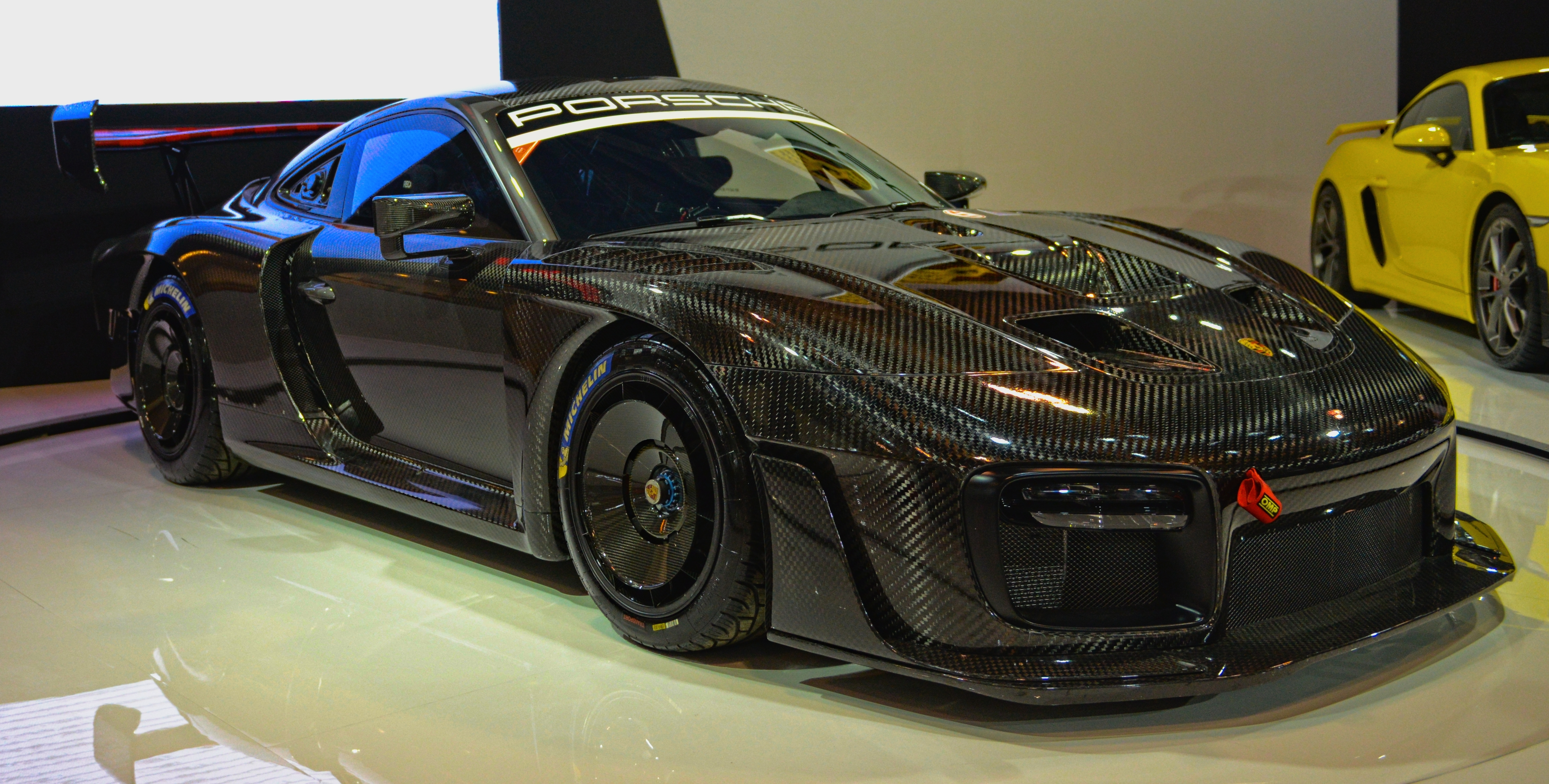
Porsche 935 at 2020 Canadian International AutoShow

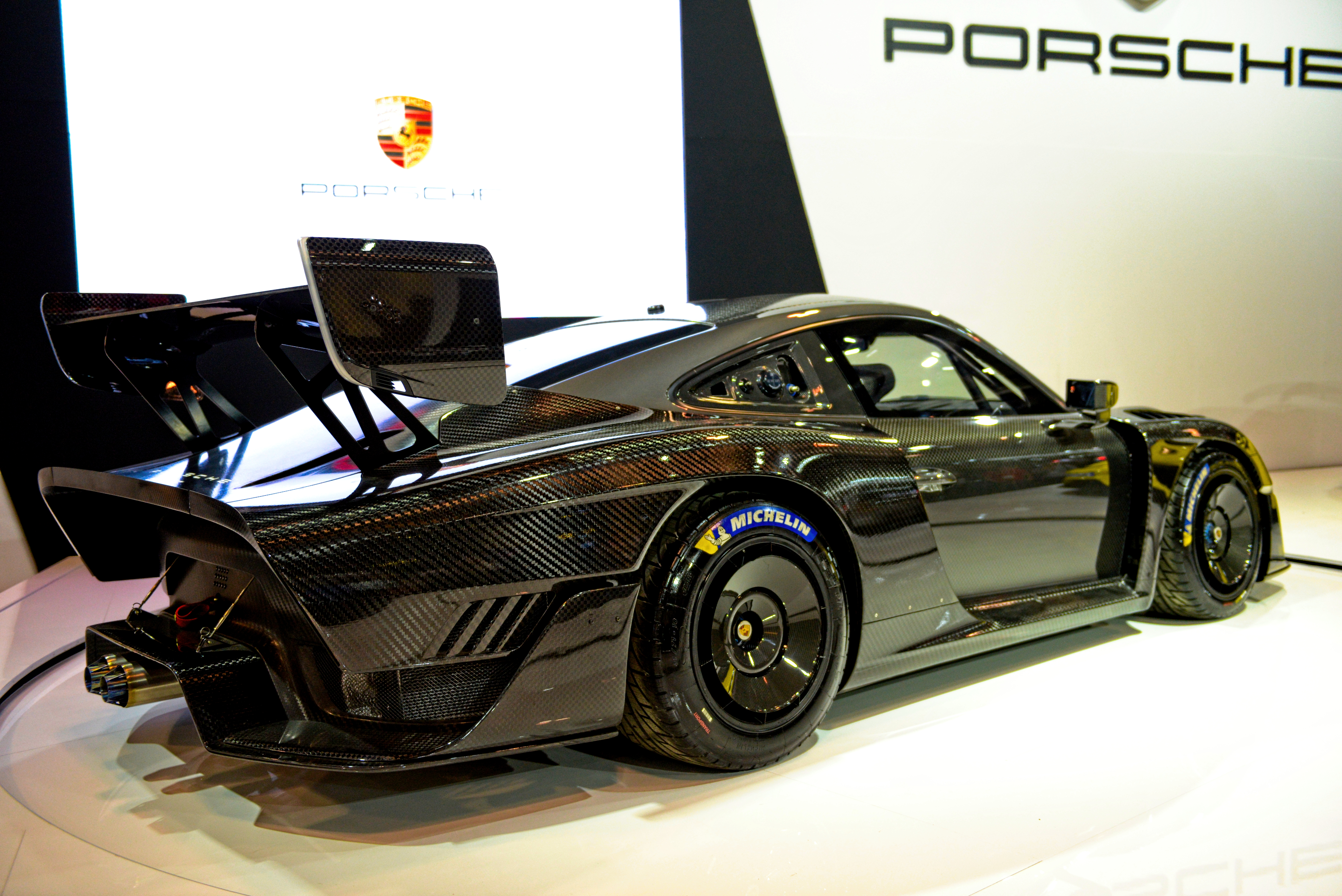
Porsche 935 at 2020 Canadian International AutoShow

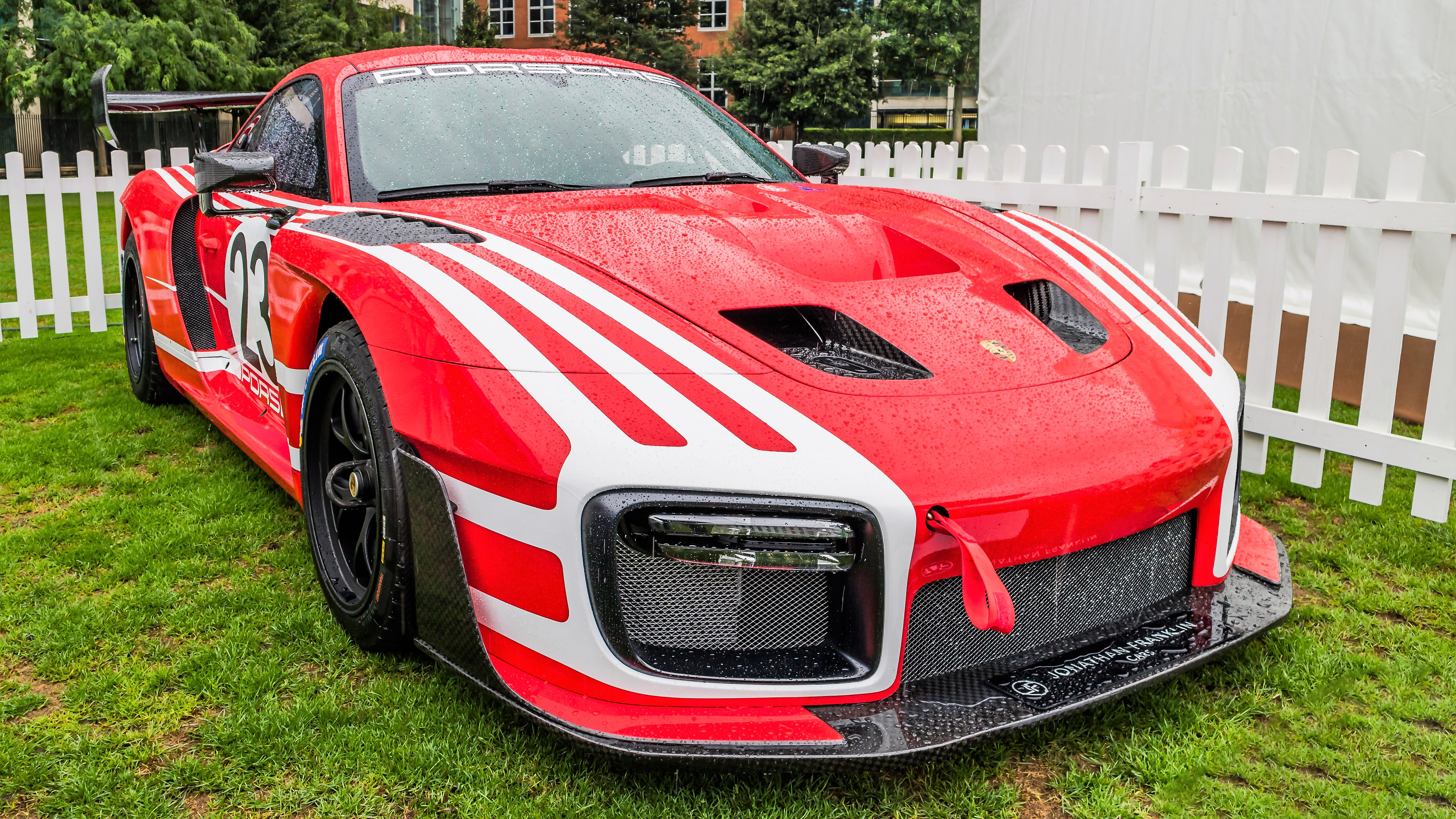
Porsche 935 at the London Concours at the Honourable Artillery Company
