= Schnitzler =

There have been several people named Schnitzler (Hebrew: שניצלר):

- Arthur Schnitzler (born 1862), an Austrian playwright and author, son of Johann
- Barbara Schnitzler (born 1953, Berlin), a German actress (de)
- Claude Schnitzler (born 1949, Strasbourg), an Alsatian-French organist (fr)
- Conrad Schnitzler (1937–2011, Düsseldorf), a German experimental musician
- Dierk H. Schnitzler, a German senior police officer in Bonn (1993–2002)
- Friedrich Wilhelm Schnitzler (1928–2011, Ohnastetten), a German business manager and CDU politician
- Johann Schnitzler (1835–1893), a Jewish Hungarian-Austrian laryngologist, father of Arthur
- Liliane Schnitzler, French dermatologist who first described Schnitzler syndrome
- Michoel Schnitzler, a chassidic singer
- René Schnitzler (born 1985, Mönchengladbach), a German football player

== Von Schnitzler ==
Schnitzler is also a Prussian aristocrat:

- Karl Eduard Schnitzler (1792, Gräfrath – 1864, Köln) (de)
  - Eduard Schnitzler (1823, Köln – 1900), a German merchant ∞ Emilie Maria Rath (de)
    - Richard von Schnitzler (1855, Köln – 1938), a German banker, nonexecutive board member of IG Farben ∞ Melanie Stein (b. 1858), a daughter of Karl (Carl Martin) Stein (de)
      - Georg (August Eduard) von (since September 20, 1913) Schnitzler (1884, Köln – 1962, Basel), executive board member of IG Farben ∞ Lilly von Schnitzler (de)
      - Ottilie Marie Edith von Schröder ∞ Kurt Freiherr von Schröder
    - Julius Eduard von (since September 20, 1913) Schnitzler (b. 1863) ∞ Margarethe Gillet
      - Karl-Eduard von Schnitzler (1918–2001), East German television personality and propagandist

== See also ==
- Schnitzler syndrome
- Schnitzler's horseshoe bat
- Schnitz
- Schnitzer
- Schnitzel
