= Porsche 911 (930) =

German turbocharged sports car variant

Porsche Turbo (930)
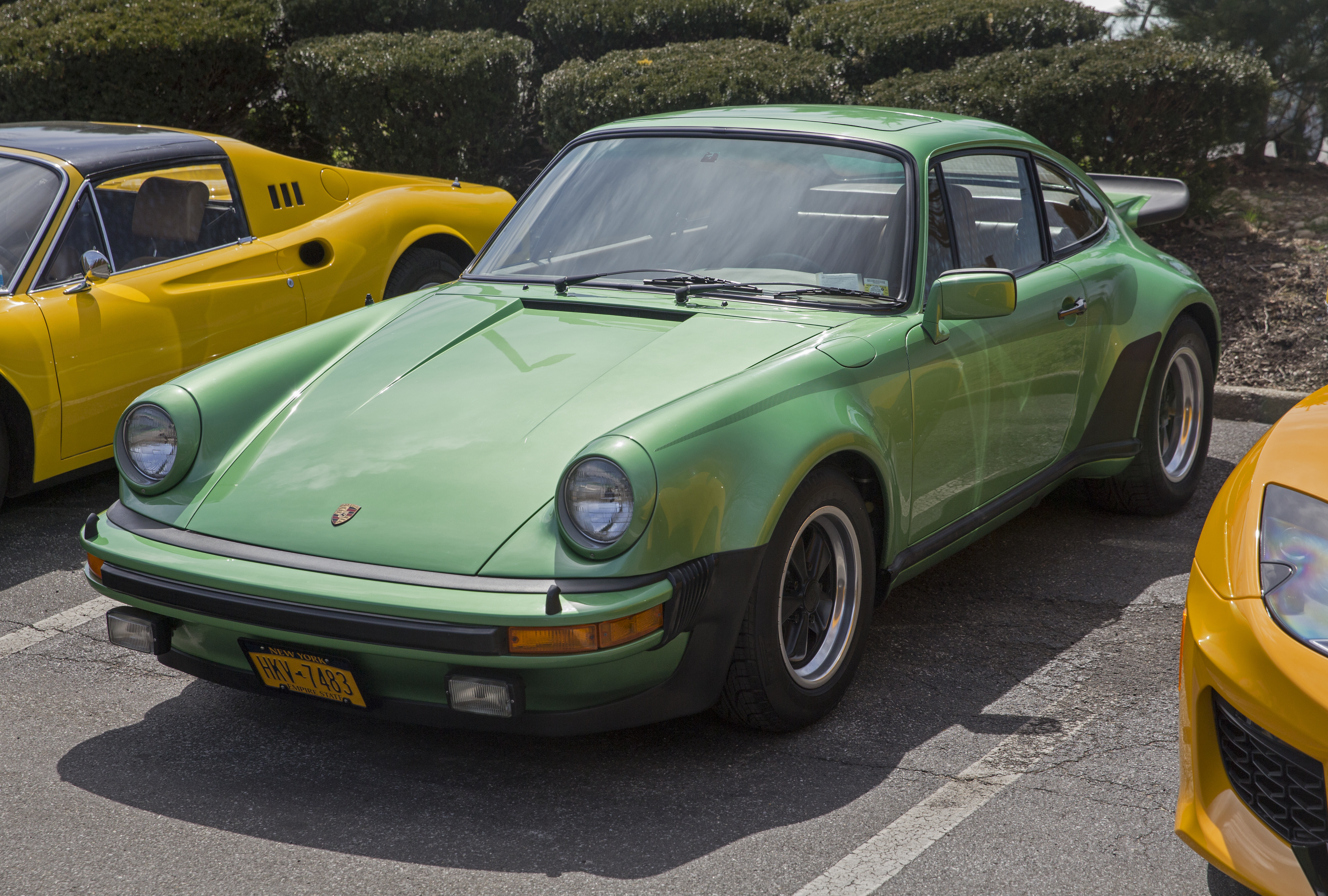
- 1976 Porsche 911 Turbo (930) (US)

Overview
- Manufacturer: Porsche AG
- Also called: Porsche 911 Turbo
- Production: 1975–1977 (3.0-litre) 2,819 produced; 1978–1989 (3.3-litre) 18,770 produced
- Assembly: West Germany: Stuttgart, Zuffenhausen

Body and chassis
- Class: Sports car (S)
- Body style: 2-door 2+2 coupé; 2-door 2+2 convertible; 2-door targa
- Layout: Rear-engine, rear-wheel-drive
- Platform: Porsche G-series
- Related: Porsche 911; Porsche 934; Porsche 935; Porsche 959; Porsche 961

Powertrain
- Engine: 3.0 L 930/50 air-cooled turbo H6; 3.3 L 930/60 air-cooled turbo H6
- Transmission: 4-speed manual 5-speed Getrag G50 manual

Dimensions
- Wheelbase: 2,272 mm (89.4 in)
- Length: 4,291 mm (168.9 in)
- Width: 1,775 mm (69.9 in)
- Height: 1,311 mm (51.6 in)
- Curb weight: 1,210–1,379 kg (2,668–3,040 lb)

Chronology
- Predecessor: Porsche 911 Carrera RS 3.0
- Successor: Porsche 964 Turbo

The Porsche 911 Turbo (930) is a turbocharged variant of the 911 model sports car manufactured by German automobile manufacturer Porsche between 1975 and 1989. It was the maker's top-of-the-range 911 model for its entire production duration and, at the time of its introduction, was the fastest production car in Germany.

== Model history ==
Porsche began experimenting with turbocharging technology on their race cars during the late 1960s, and in 1972 began development on a turbocharged version of the 911. Porsche originally needed to produce the car in order to comply with homologation regulations and had intended on marketing it as a street legal race vehicle like the 1973 Carrera 2.7 RS. The FIA's Appendix "J” rules upon which the 911 Turbo Carrera RSR 2.1 was entered into competition in 1974 changed in 1975 and 1976. The FIA announced that cars for Group 4 and Group 5 had to be production cars and be available for sale to individual purchasers through manufacturer dealer networks. For the 1976 season, new FIA regulations required manufacturers to produce 400 cars within a twenty-four-month period to gain approval for Group 4. Group 5 would require the car to be derived from a homologated model in Group 3 or 4. Porsche's Group 4 entry was the 911 Turbo RSR (934), homologated on 6 December 1975. For Group 5, Porsche would develop one of the most successful racing cars of the time, the 935. The 911 Turbo was put into production in 1975. While the original purpose of the 911 Turbo was to gain homologation for the 1976 racing season, it quickly became popular among car enthusiasts. Four hundred cars were produced by the end of 1975. Since Porsche wanted to compete in the 1976 season, they gained FIA homologation for the Porsche Turbo for Group 4 in Nr. 645 on 6 December 1975 and the 1,000th 911 Turbo was completed on 5 May 1976.

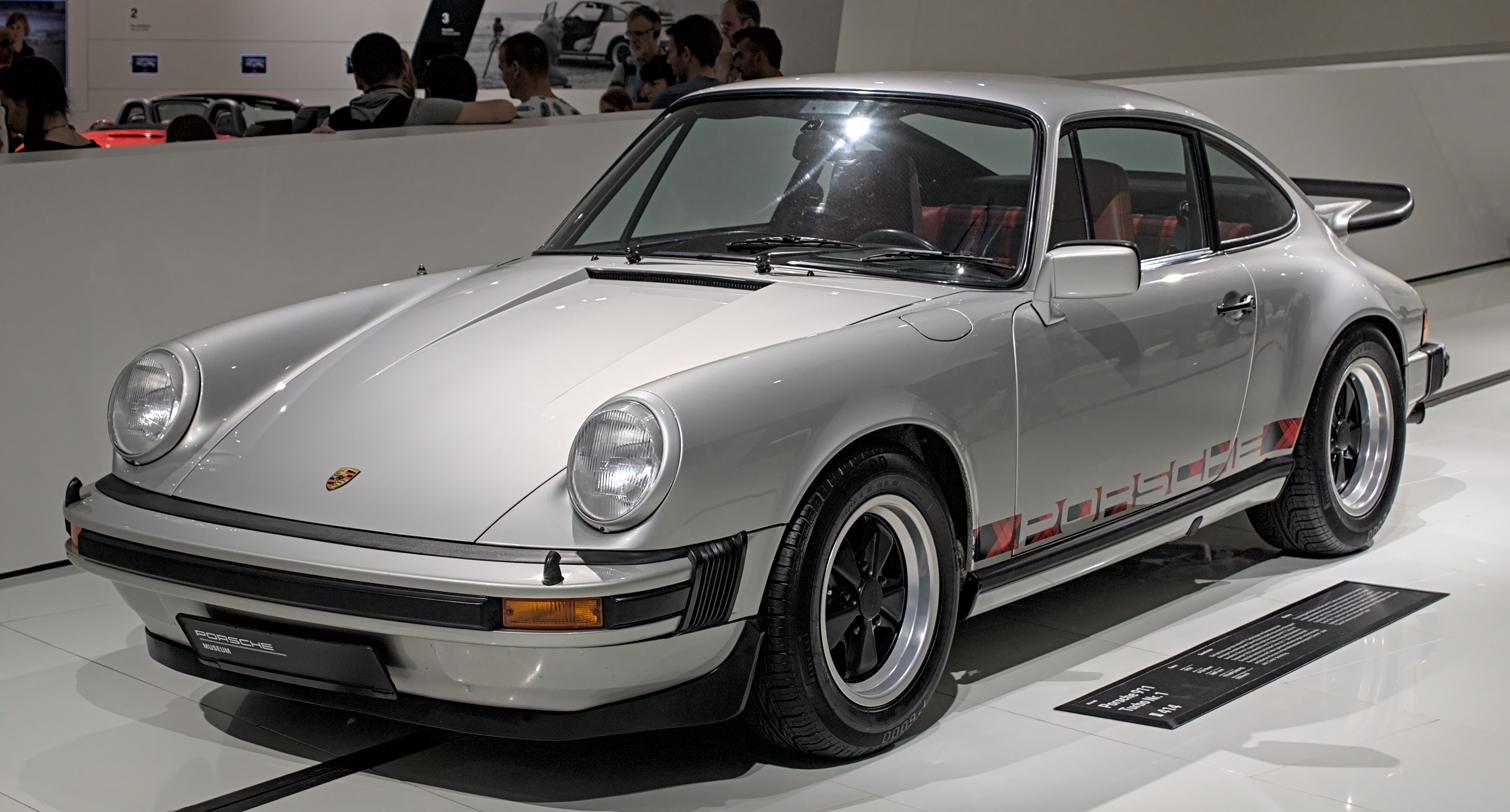
Porsche 930 Turbo No. 1

Ferry Porsche gave the first Turbo model to his sister Louise Piëch for her 70th birthday. Although this 911 Turbo No. 1 already has the large rear spoiler of the later production model, it still has the narrower bodywork of the Carrera, whose lettering at the rear has not been removed. In addition, the 911 Turbo No. 1 has only a turbocharged 2.7-litre boxer engine with 177 kW (240 hp) instead of the 3.0-litre boxer engine installed later.

Ernst Fuhrmann adapted the turbo-technology originally developed for the 917/30 CAN-AM car and applied it to the 3.0 litre flat-six used in Carrera RS 3.0, thus creating what Porsche internally dubbed as the 930. The car utilises a single KK&K turbocharger.

Total power output from the engine was 260 PS (191 kW; 256 hp) at 5,500 rpm and 329 N⋅m (243 lb⋅ft) of torque at 4,000 rpm, much more than the standard Carrera it was based on. The engine has a compression ratio of 6.5:1. In order to ensure that the platform could make the most of the higher power output, a revised suspension, larger brakes and a stronger gearbox became part of the package, although some consumers were unhappy with Porsche's use of a four-speed transmission whilst a five-speed manual transmission was available in the "lower trim" Carrera. A "whale tail" rear spoiler was installed to help vent more air to the engine and to create more downforce at the rear of the vehicle, and wider rear wheels with upgraded tires combined with flared wheel arches were implemented in order to increase the car's width and grip, making it more stable.

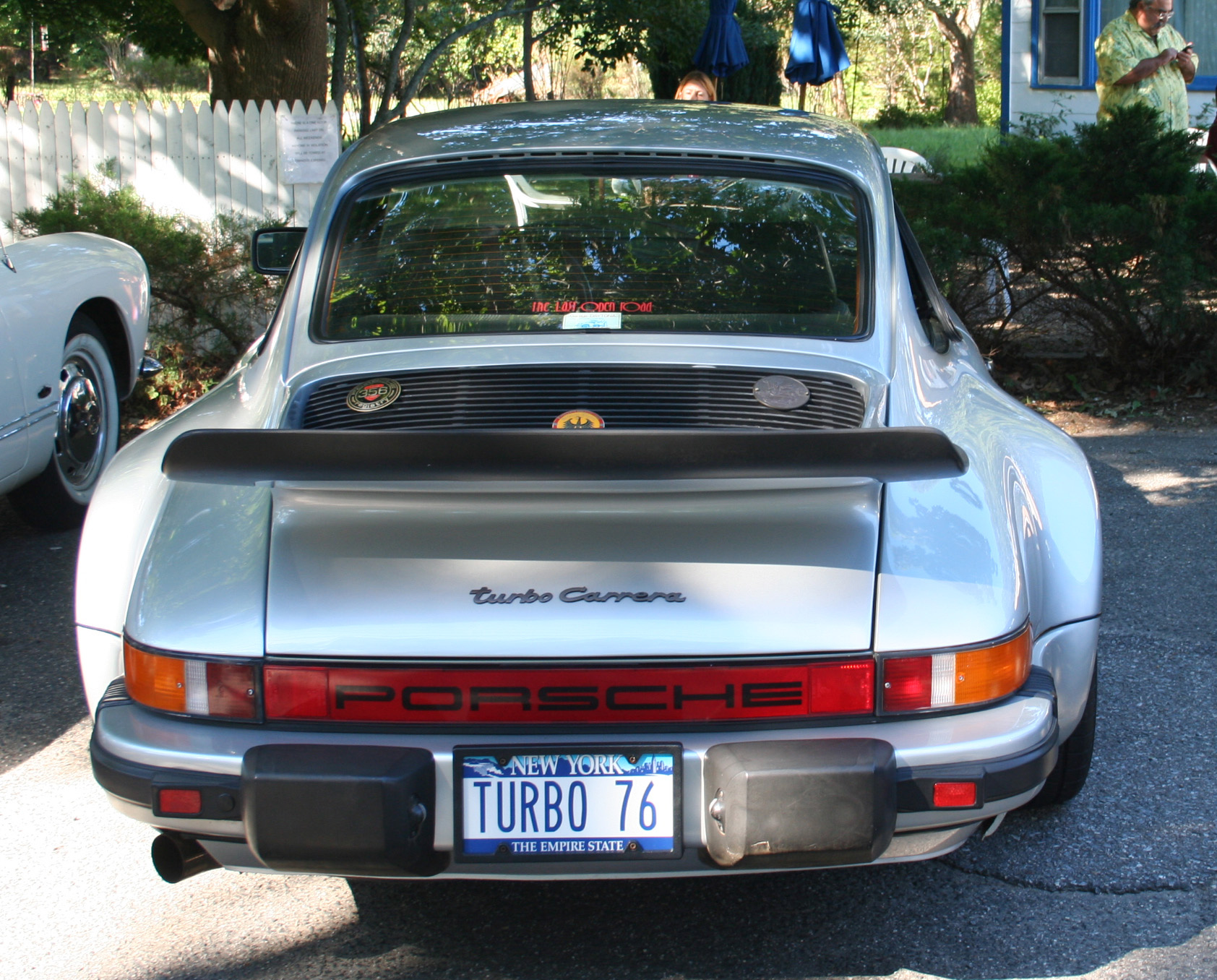
Early US-spec 930 with "Turbo Carrera" badging

Porsche badged the vehicle simply as "Turbo" (although early U.S. units were badged as "Turbo Carrera") and introduced the vehicle at the Paris Auto Show in October 1974 before putting it on sale in the spring of 1975; export to the United States began in 1976.

The 930 proved very fast but also very demanding to drive, and due to its short wheelbase and rear engine layout, was prone to oversteer and turbo-lag. It acquired the nickname "the Widowmaker" after several crashes and deaths attributed to its handling characteristics, which were unfamiliar to many drivers. Under certain conditions, applying too much throttle would cause the heavy rear end of the car to swing outward like a pendulum, causing the car to spin out. To this day, Porsche corporate employees who drive 911 Turbo models for testing or for business reasons are mandated to undergo "Turbo Training", despite the fact that newer 911 Turbo models are generally safer and easier to drive.

Porsche made its first and most significant changes to the 930 for 1978 model year, enlarging the engine bore by 2 mm (0.08 in) to a total displacement of 3,299 cc (3.3 L; 201.3 cu in) and adding an air-to-air intercooler. By cooling the pressurised air charge, the intercooler helped increase power output to 300 PS (221 kW; 296 hp) at 5,500 rpm and 412 N⋅m (304 lb⋅ft) of torque at 4,000 rpm (DIN); the rear "whale tail" spoiler was re-profiled and raised slightly to make room for the intercooler and the spoiler was now called the "tea tray" spoiler by the enthusiasts. The suspension benefitted from new anti-roll bars, firmer shock absorbers and larger diameter rear torsion bars. Porsche also upgraded the brakes to units similar to those used on the 917 race car. While the increase in displacement and addition of an intercooler increased power output and torque, these changes also increased the weight of the vehicle, especially the engine, which contributed to a substantial change in the handling and character of the car compared to the earlier 3.0-litre models.

Changing emissions regulations in Japan and the United States forced Porsche to withdraw the 930 from those markets in 1980. It however remained available in Canada. Envisioning the luxurious 928 gran turismo eventually replacing the 911 as the top of the Porsche model lineup, Fuhrmann cut back further development on the model, and it was not until his resignation that the company finally committed the financing to update the car's emissions systems, and recertify the 930 for sale in all markets.

The 930 remained available in Europe, and for 1983 a 330 PS (243 kW; 325 hp) at 5750 rpm and 432 N⋅m (319 lb⋅ft) of torque at 4000 rpm performance option became available on a build-to-order basis from Porsche. With the so-called Werksleistungssteigerung (WLS, "Works Performance Increase") add-on came a quad-pipe exhaust system and an additional oil-cooler requiring a remodelled front spoiler and units bearing the add-on often featured additional ventilation holes in the rear fenders and modified rockers.

By the 1985 model year, 928 sales had risen slightly, but the question remained as to whether it would supersede the 911 as the company's premier model. Porsche reintroduced the 930 to the Japanese and U.S. markets in 1986 with an emission-controlled engine having a power output of 282 hp (210 kW; 286 PS) at 5500 rpm and 377 N⋅m (278 lb⋅ft) at 4000 rpm of torque. At the same time Porsche introduced targa and cabriolet variants, both of which proved popular.

Porsche discontinued the 930 after the 1989 model year when its underlying "G-Series" platform was being replaced by the 964. The 1989 models were the first and last versions of the 930 to feature the Getrag G50 five-speed manual transmission. A turbocharged variant of the 964 officially succeeded the 930 in 1991 with a modified version of the same 3.3-litre flat-six engine and a five-speed transmission.

=== Flatnose (Slantnose 930S) ===
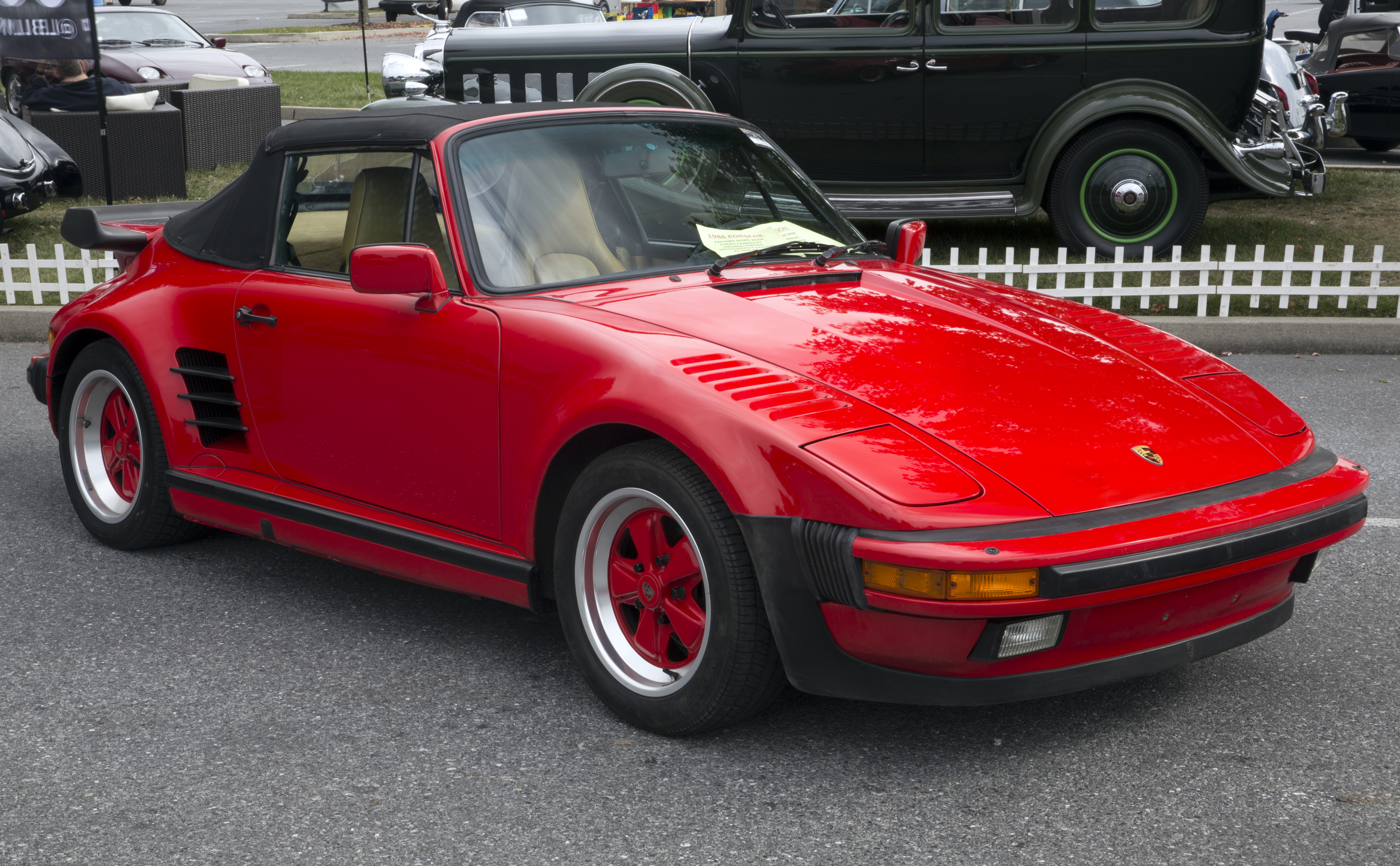
1988 factory 930 Cabriolet flatnose

Kremer Racing had originally begun offering conversion kits for 930 Turbo models which included front bodywork like the famous 935 race car in 1981. In 1982, TAG Heuer co-owner Mansour Ojjeh commissioned Porsche to develop a road-legal version of the 935 race car. The final product was developed using a body shell of the 930 and fitting fabricated 935 body panels to it. The one-off also had the suspension and brakes shared with the 935 race car. Other special features of the car included special paintwork called Brilliant Red by the manufacturer, BBS wheels and the use of the 3.3-litre turbocharged flat-6 engine of the 934 race car. The car proved very popular among enthusiasts and prospective buyers began to demand a similar car as a factory offering. Porsche offered a "Flachbau" ("flatnose" or "slantnose") 930 under the "Sonderwunschprogramm" (special order program) from 1986 model year, an otherwise normal 930 with a 935-style slantnose instead of the normal 911 front end with the replacement of the famous "bug eye" headlamps with pop-up units.

Each Flachbau unit was handcrafted by remodeling the front fenders (option code M505 for the US and M506 elsewhere). A limited number of units were produced due to the fact that the package commanded a high premium price, an initial premium of up to 60 per cent (highly individualised cars requiring even more) over the standard price. 948 units were built in total with 160 of them being imported to the US. The Flachbau units delivered in Europe usually featured the 330 PS (243 kW; 325 hp) WLS performance kit. The flat nose greatly contributed to the aerodynamics of the car and enabled it to accelerate from 0–97 km/h in 4.85 seconds and attain a top speed of 278 km/h (173 mph) (figures with the performance kit).

== Independently tested performance data ==
Performance data: Porsche 930 European version
Model	0–97 km/h (0–60 mph)	0–100 km/h (0–62 mph)	0–160 km/h (0–100 mph)	0–200 km/h (0–124 mph)	1/4-mile	1 km	Top speed
1975 930 (260 PS)	5.2 s	5.2 s	11.8 s	19.8 s	?	24.2 s	250 km/h (155.3 mph)
1978 930 (300 PS)	5.0 s	5.4 s	11.9 s	19.7 s	13.7 s at 171.4 km/h (106.5 mph)	24.4 s	260.9 km/h (162 mph)
1983 930 (330 PS) Flachbau	4.7 s	4.85 s	?	?	?	?	275 km/h (171 mph)
1984 930 (330 PS)	4.6 s	4.8 s	11.6 s	17.7 s	?	23.8 s	278 km/h (173 mph)
1989 930 (with 5-speed gearbox)	4.9 s	5.1 s	12.0 s	20.4 s	13.6	24.6 s	260 km/h (162 mph)

Performance test results: Porsche 930 US version
Model	0–30 mph	0–50 mph	0–60 mph	0–80 mph	0–100 mph	0–120 mph	1/4-mile	Top speed
1975 930 (234 hp)	1.9 s	3.7 s	4.9 s	7.9 s	12.9 s	?	13.5 s at 103 mph	156 mph (251 km/h)
1978 930 (261 hp)	2.1 s	3.6 s	4.9 s	7.5 s	12.1 s	?	13.7 s at 104.2 mph	165 mph (266 km/h)
1986 930 (282 hp)	1.6 s	3.3 s	4.6 s	7.3 s	11.9 s	18.9 s	13.1 s at 105 mph	155 mph (250 km/h)
1987 930 cabriolet (282 hp)	1.7 s	3.7 s	4.9 s	8.4 s	13.0 s	20.6 s	13.5 s at 102 mph	150 mph (242 km/h)

Car and Driver recorded a 0–60 mph acceleration time of 4.9 seconds for both the 1975 and 1978 Porsche 911 Turbo, they shared first place in the magazine's "quickest cars of the 1970s" ranking with a 0.4-second lead.

== TAG Turbo ==
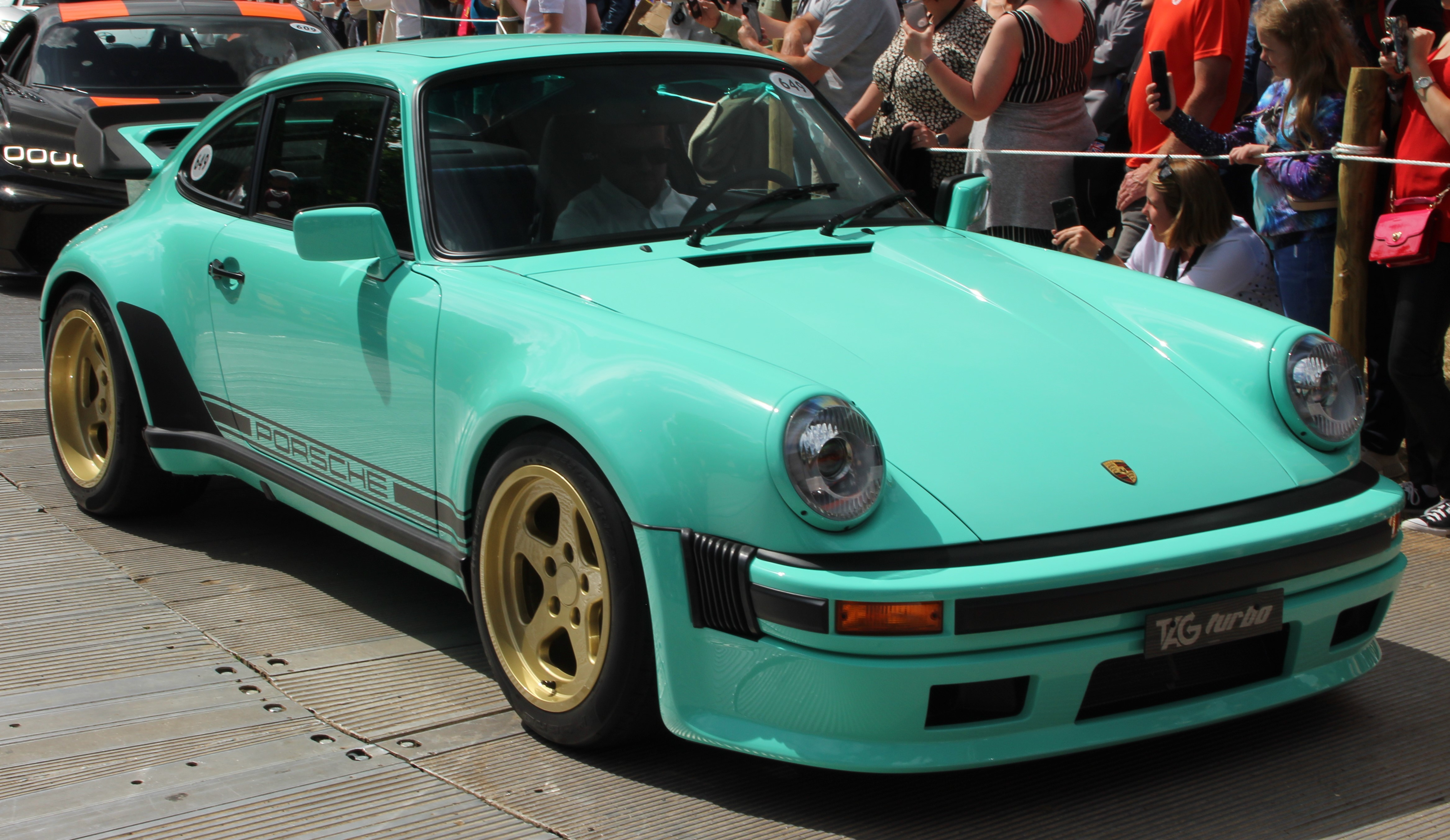
Porsche 930 TAG Turbo

In the 1980s, Porsche built twin-turbocharged 1.5-litre V6 engines for the McLaren Formula One team. The engine was given the code TTE P01 and was fitted in the McLaren MP4/2 and MP4/3 generating 760–1,014 PS (559–746 kW; 750–1,000 hp) depending on track conditions. The engine was financed by Luxembourgian holdings company Techniques d'Avant Garde (TAG), leading to the engine being branded as the TAG Turbo. A Porsche 930 Turbo was used as a test mule by McLaren in order to test the engine's capability. The car was exterior-wise similar to the standard 930 Turbo but featured RUF sourced wheels instead of the standard Fuchs units, a taller whale tail rear spoiler in order to accommodate a large pair of intercoolers and a new front bumper. The changes to the interior consisted of racing bucket seats and a new TAG branded tachometer with a 10,000 rpm redline.

In September 2018, English automotive company Lanzante introduced a new model based on the same principle at the RennSport Reunion VI. The company obtained permission from McLaren to produce the model and bought 11 of those engines originally installed in the F1 cars for this purpose from the manufacturer. Cosworth is tasked to restore the engines. Each of the 11 cars fitted with the engines would come with a plaque signifying the engine's race history, engine number and the car's production number. The Lanzante display car's engine was originally fitted in 1984 to Niki Lauda's MP4/2 in which he won the British GP.

== Gallery ==
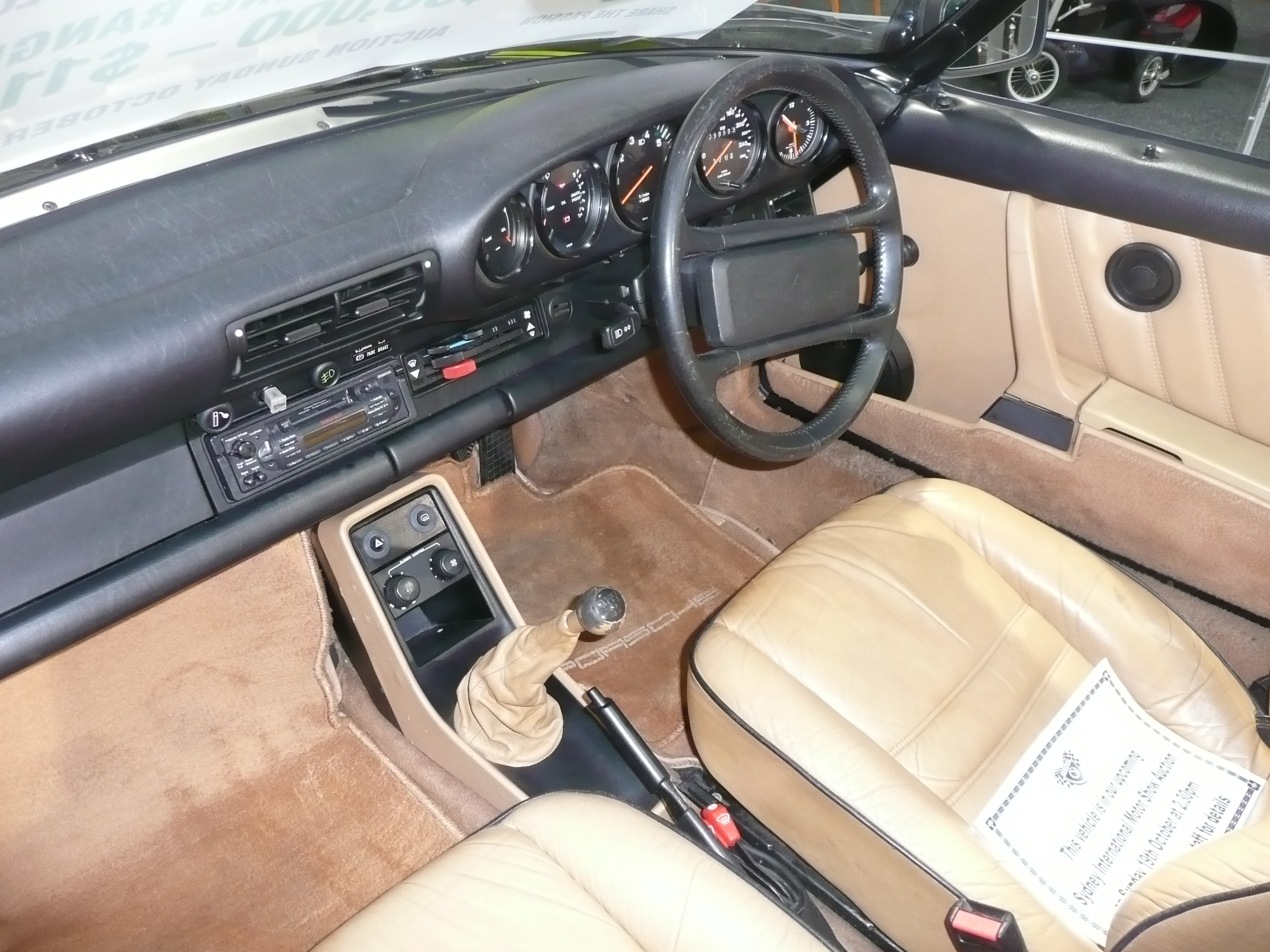
Interior

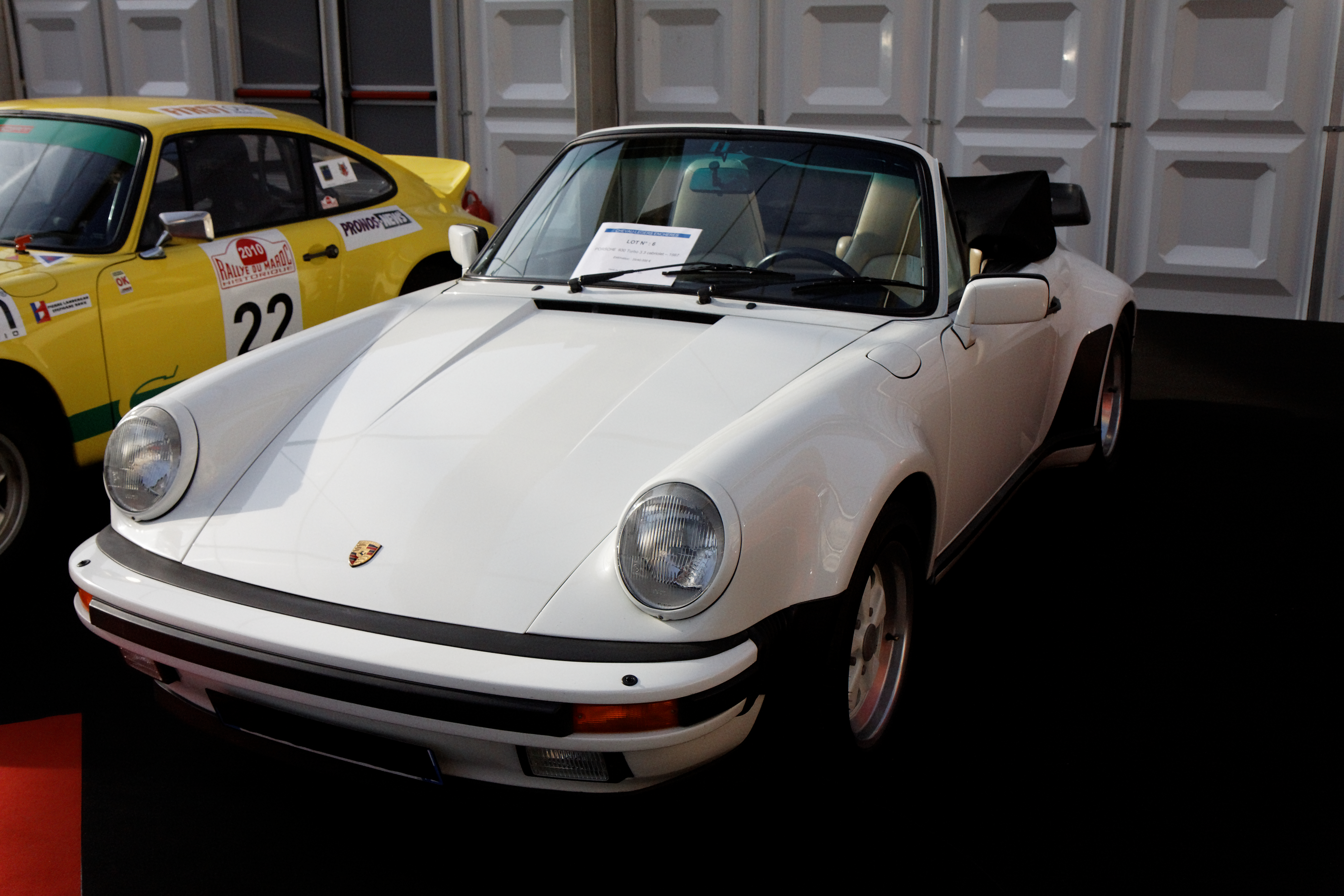
930 cabriolet

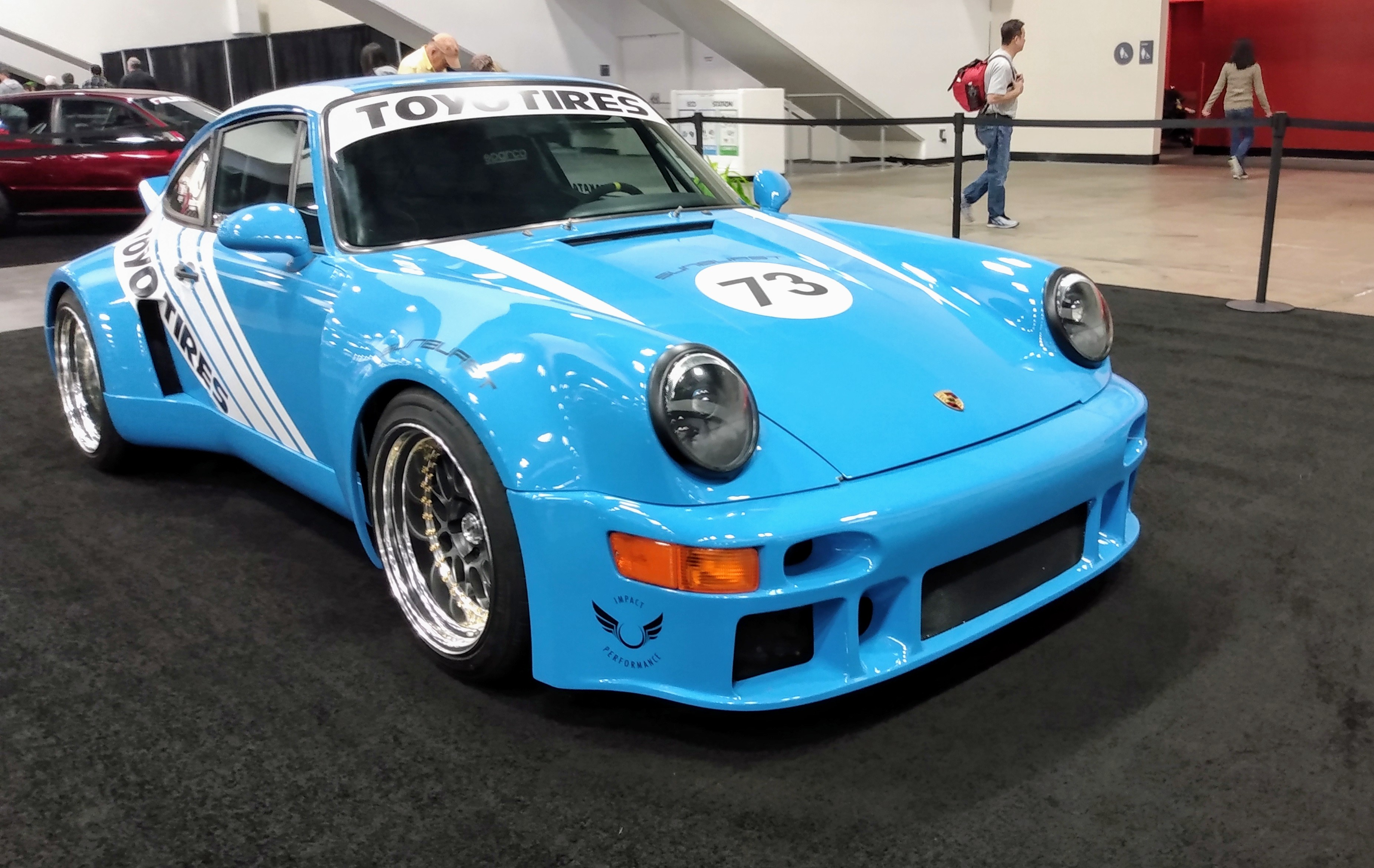
Toyo Tires Porsche 930 Turbo

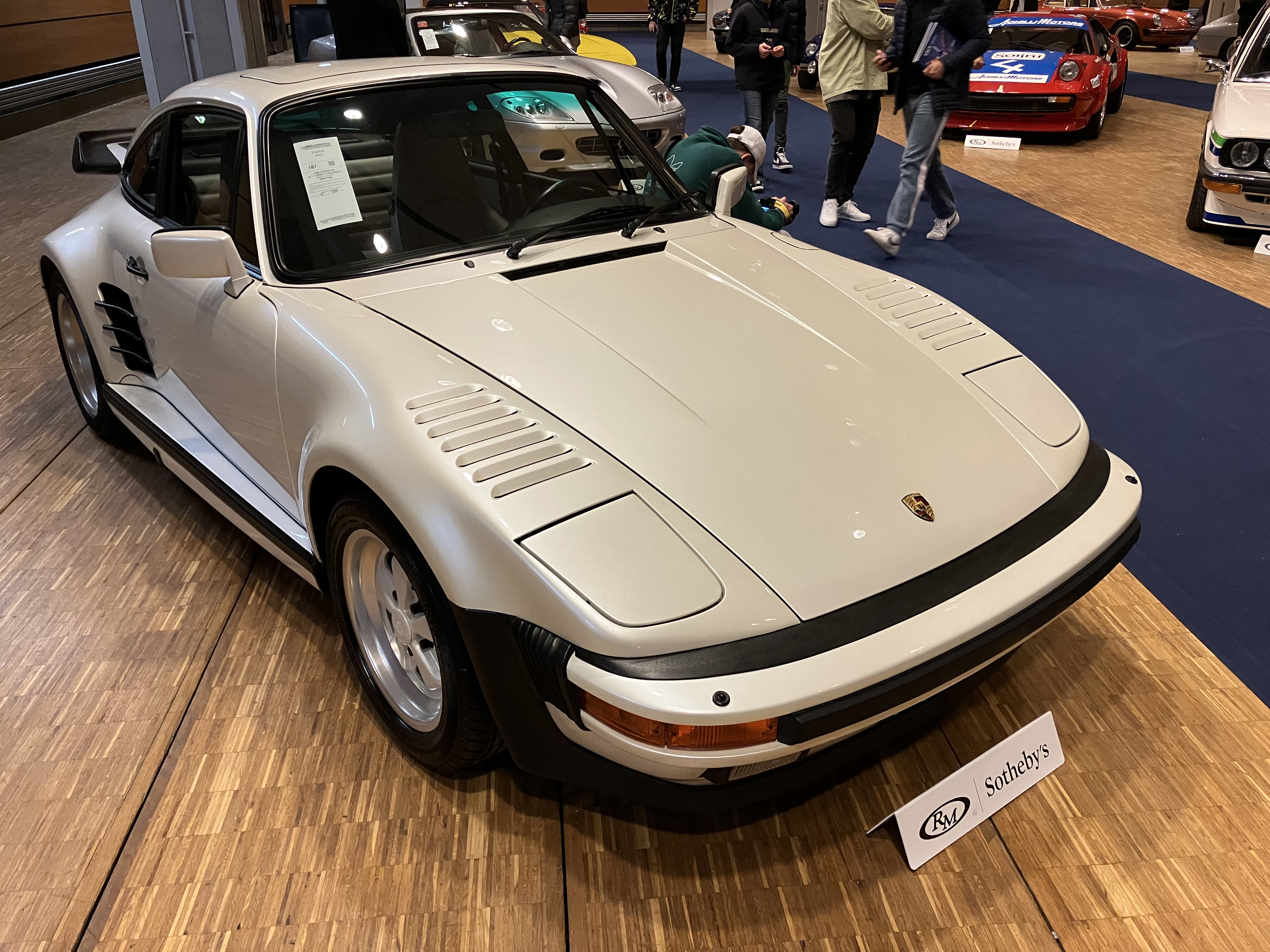
930 Turbo Coupe Slantnose

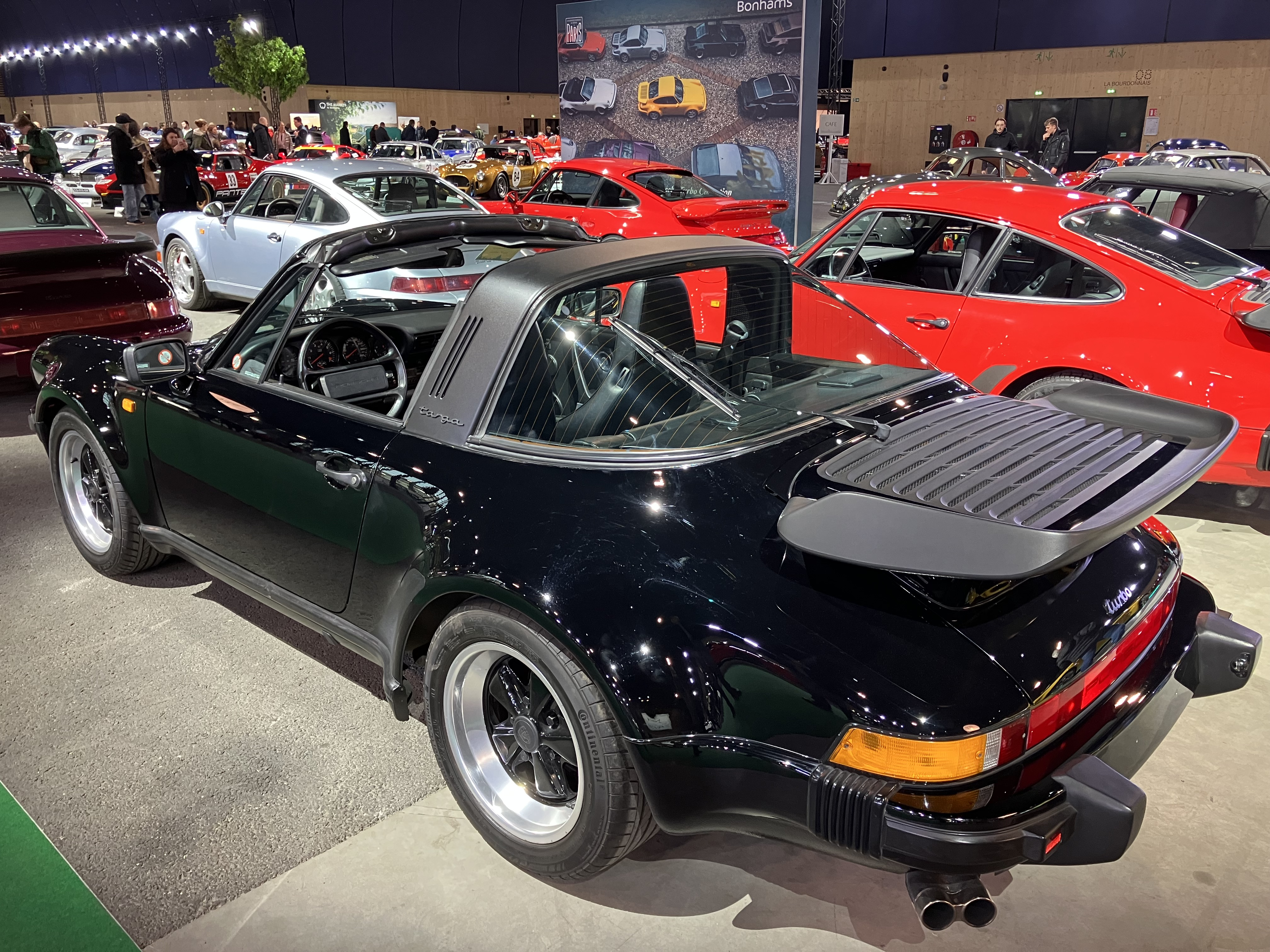
1989 Porsche 930 Turbo 3.3 G50 Targa

== General and cited references ==
- Bongers, Marc (2004). Porsche - Serienfahrzeuge und Sportwagen seit 1948 (first edition). Motorbuch Verlag. ISBN 3-613-02388-1.
- Peter Vann and C Beker, M Jurgens, M Kockritz, E Schimpf (2004). Porsche Turbo: The Full History of the Race and Production Cars. Motorbooks International, USA. ISBN 0-7603-1923-5.
