= Schnitzer =

Schnitzer is a German noun meaning "carver" and is the surname of:

- Eduard Schnitzer (1840–1892), physician, naturalist and governor of the Egyptian province of Equatoria on the upper Nile
- Florian Schnitzer (born 1981), German ice hockey player
- Friedrich Ferdinand Schnitzer, 19th-century Bavarian-American architect
- Germaine Schnitzer (1888–1982), French pianist based in America
- Sam Schnitzer, Russian-Jewish immigrant to the U.S., founder of Radius Recycling, an American steel manufacturing company.
  - Harold Schnitzer (1923–2011), American businessman and philanthropist, son of Sam Schnitzer
  - Arlene Schnitzer (1929-2020), American art collector, wife of Harold Schnitzer, major donor to Arlene Schnitzer Concert Hall in Portland, Oregon
  - Jordan Schnitzer (born 1951), American businessman and philanthropist, son of Harold and Arlene Schnitzer, major donor to Jordan Schnitzer Museum of Art
- Herbert Schnitzer, German, owner and co-founder of Schnitzer Motorsport
- Josef Schnitzer, German racedriver and co-founder of Schnitzer Motorsport
- Joseph Schnitzer (1859 in Lauingen – 1939 in Munich ), a theologian
- Mark Schnitzer, a biophysicist
- Monika Schnitzer (born 1961), German economist
- Robert C. Schnitzer (1906–2008), an American actor, producer, educator, and theater administrator
- Tim Schnitzer (born 2008), German footballer
- Werner Schnitzer (born 1942), German television actor

Schnitzer may also refer to:

- AC Schnitzer, the BMW tuning specialist department of Schnitzer Motorsport based in Aachen
- Schnitzer Motorsport, Germany-based BMW Motorsport Team that races in World Touring Car Championship

== See also ==
- Schnitzler
- Schnitzel
- Snitzer
