= Schnitzler's horseshoe bat =

Conservation status
- Data Deficient (IUCN 3.1)

Scientific classification
- Domain: Eukaryota
- Kingdom: Animalia
- Phylum: Chordata
- Class: Mammalia
- Order: Chiroptera
- Family: Rhinolophidae
- Genus: Rhinolophus
- Species: R. schnitzleri

Binomial name
- Rhinolophus schnitzleri Wu and Thong, 2011

Species of bat

Schnitzler's horseshoe bat (Rhinolophus schnitzleri) is a species of bat in the family Rhinolophidae. It is endemic to China.

== Taxonomy ==
The bat was first described by Wu Yi and Vu Dinh Thong in 2011. The holotype was collected in Xiao-dong Cave, Yunnan province, about 50 km from Kunming City.The species is named after Professor Hans-Ulrich Schnitzler in recognition of his contribution to the study of bats.

It belongs to the philippinensis species group.

== Description ==
The bat is a large species of the genus Rhinolophus. It has a forearm length of around 58 mm (2.3 in). It also has a tail length of 26.9 mm (1.06 in). It also possesses very large ears. The bat is light brown and chestnut on the ventral and dorsal regions, respectively. The interfemoral and wing membranes are a brown color. The hair is long, with a length of 8.6–13.5 mm (0.34–0.53 in). The horseshoe is a light grey in color. It is broad and almost circular in shape. It is posteriorly contiguous with the anterior face of the lancet, and greatly exceeds the breadth of the muzzle. It has no supplementary leaflets.

== Habitat and distribution ==
The bat is known only from the holotype inhabiting the Yunnan province in China. It is cave dwelling.

== Conservation ==
Not much is known about the bat. However, as it is a cave-dwelling species, usual threats to cave-dwelling bats, such as in-roost disturbance probably affect it.
