= Miriam Snitzer =

American actress

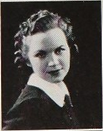
- Photo of Miriam Snitzer from 1940 Beverly Hills High School yearbook
- Born: October 6, 1922; Cincinnati, Ohio, U.S.
- Died: September 6, 1966 (aged 43); Los Angeles, California, U.S.
- Other name: Miriam Snitzer Clark
- Occupation: Actress
- Spouse: Joseph C. Clark (m.1961)

Miriam Jacqueline Snitzer (October 6, 1922 – September 6, 1966), also known as Miriam Snitzer Clark, was an American actress.

== Life ==
Snitzer was born in Cincinnati, Ohio, on October 6, 1922, to Marie Donahue Snitzer and Louis A. Snitzer, a Hollywood agent who represented such clients as actor Buster Crabbe. She had two brothers, James G. Snitzer, who would become an actor and later die in combat during World War II, and Louis T. Snitzer.

During her youth the Snitzer family lived in Cincinnati. They eventually moved to Los Angeles and developed strong ties to the Hollywood film industry. The Snitzers resided on Benedict Canyon Road in Beverly Hills, California. Snitzer appeared in numerous films, including the 1947 production, Easy Come, Easy Go.

In December 1961 Snitzer married Joseph C. Clark, more than ten years her elder. Snitzer died on 6 September 1966 in California. She is buried at Holy Cross Cemetery, in Culver City, California. Just two months after her death, her father Louis died.
