= Florian Schnitzer =

German ice hockey player

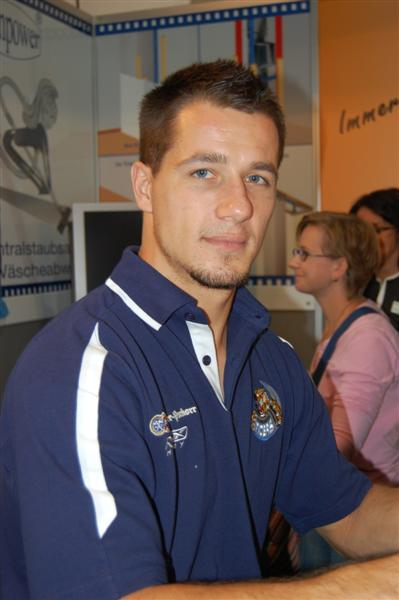
- Born: January 28, 1981 (age 45) Garmisch-Partenkirchen, West Germany
- Height: 5 ft 11 in (180 cm)
- Weight: 187 lb (85 kg; 13 st 5 lb)
- Position: Right wing
- Shot: Right
- Played for: SC Riessersee; Straubing Tigers; Krefeld Pinguine; Hamburg Freezers; Augsburger Panther; Bietigheim Steelers
- NHL draft: Undrafted
- Playing career: 1999–2013

Florian Schnitzer (born January 28, 1981) is a former German professional ice hockey player. He last played for Bietigheim Steelers in the 2nd Bundesliga.

== Career statistics ==
			Regular season					Playoffs
Season	Team	League	GP	G	A	Pts	PIM	GP	G	A	Pts	PIM
1998–99	SC Riessersee	Germany2	1	0	0	0	0	—	—	—	—	—
1999–00	SC Riessersee	Germany2	42	0	3	3	18	—	—	—	—	—
2000–01	SC Riessersee	Germany2	43	4	2	6	30	5	0	0	0	2
2001–02	SC Riessersee	Germany2	61	6	8	14	78	—	—	—	—	—
2002–03	SC Riessersee	Germany2	52	2	17	19	50	11	0	2	2	4
2003–04	Straubing Tigers	Germany2	42	4	10	14	46	3	1	1	2	4
2004–05	Krefeld Pinguine	DEL	51	5	5	10	73	—	—	—	—	—
2005–06	Hamburg Freezers	DEL	50	2	4	6	66	6	0	0	0	0
2006–07	Hamburg Freezers	DEL	52	2	4	6	38	7	0	0	0	2
2007–08	Hamburg Freezers	DEL	42	5	7	12	26	8	0	0	0	4
2008–09	Straubing Tigers	DEL	40	2	3	5	26	—	—	—	—	—
2009–10	Straubing Tigers	DEL	50	2	12	14	42	—	—	—	—	—
2010–11	Augsburger Panther	DEL	27	1	3	4	4	—	—	—	—	—
2011–12	Augsburger Panther	DEL	16	2	0	2	4	—	—	—	—	—
2012–13	Augsburger Panther	DEL	34	0	1	1	2	—	—	—	—	—
2012–13	Bietigheim Steelers	Germany2	13	0	3	3	12	13	2	6	8	4
DEL totals			362	21	39	60	281	21	0	0	0	6
