= Michoel Schnitzler =

American Hasidic singer

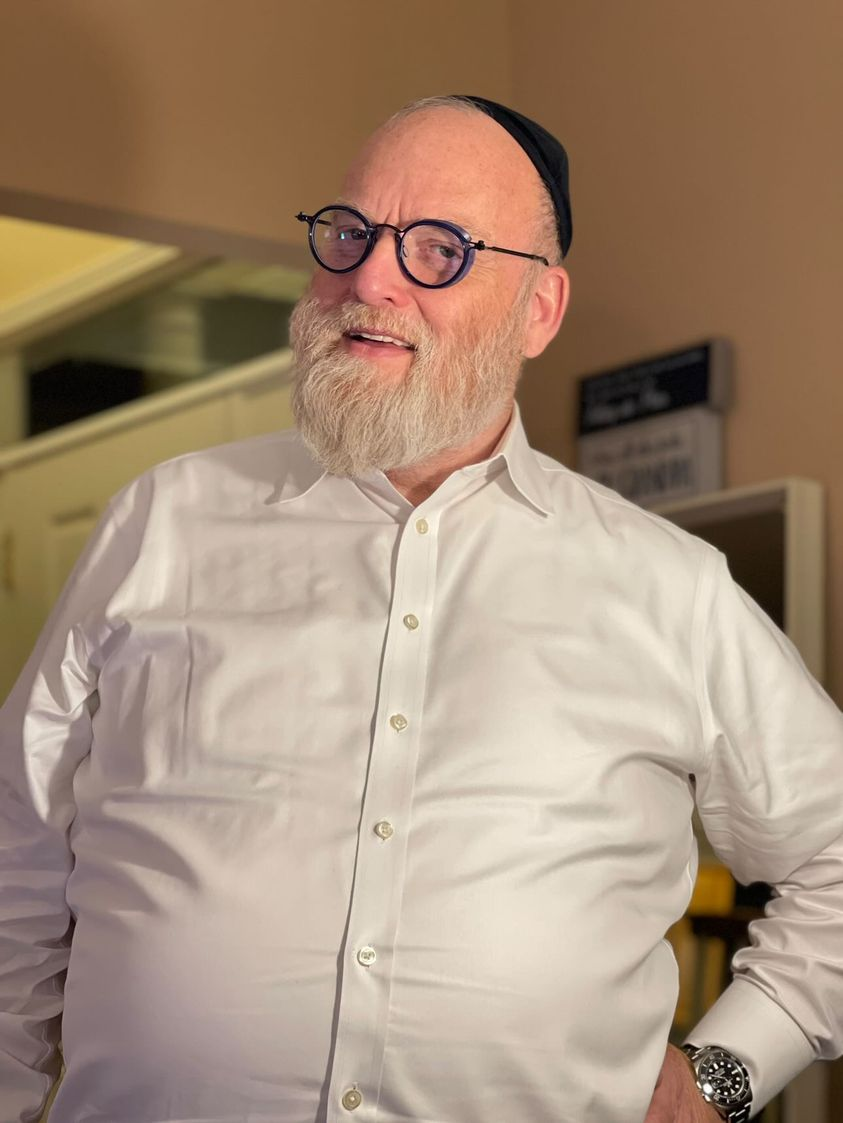
- Schnitzler in 2023

Background information
- Born: August 7, 1961, US
- Died: April 14, 2023 (aged 61) Monsey, New York, US
- Website: michoelschnitzler.com

Michoel Schnitzler (August 7, 1961 – April 14, 2023) was an American Hasidic singer and composer. He released over 150 mostly Yiddish-language songs.

== Early life ==
Schnitzler was born on August 7, 1961, into a rabbinic family in Brooklyn NY. After his father died when Michoel was 15 years old, he studied at the Tosh yeshiva in Quebec, Canada.

== Career ==
Schnitzler started singing in the 1980s after he was married and had two children, when he was at the Satmar Rebbe's tish on Succos and he was asked to sing. Initially embarrassed, he sang while turned to the wall, and was encouraged after he received a warm reception. He was then hired to sing at a wedding, which was followed by more weddings, despite it being unusual to have a singer at Orthodox Jewish weddings in those times.

He released his first album in 2000. He has since released 15 albums including over 150 songs. He also composed songs for other singers, including Lipa Schmeltzer, Pinky Weber, and Motti Ilowitz. He sung at over 4,200 weddings.

Schnitzler sang Yiddish comedic tunes and classical tunes and added his own style to them. He sung with a booming voice and interacted with the audience when singing at events. His albums were mostly soulful Yiddish melodies, as well as upbeat songs. Some Hasidic rabbis disapproved of his style, which led to him moving out of the Hasidic enclave of Kiryas Joel.

== Personal life ==
Schnitzler was divorced and lived in poverty for part of his life. He suffered from a heart condition and was hospitalized several times, which once in February 2017 led to rumors that he had died, after which he released a recording joking that he had not yet died.

Schnitzler died on April 14, 2023 from a heart attack in Monsey, New York. He was eulogized by his sons, Rabbi Yosef Yechiel Mechel Lebovits, and singer Lipa Schmeltzer.
