= James G. Snitzer =

American actor

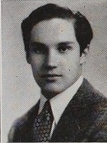
- Photo of James Snitzer from 1943 Beverly Hills High School yearbook
- Born: 1925; Cincinnati, Ohio, U.S.
- Died: 22 March 1945 (aged 19-20); Asbach, Germany
- Cause of death: Killed in action
- Other names: Jimmy Snitzer, Jim Snitzer
- Occupation: Actor

James George Snitzer (1925 – 22 March 1945), also known as Jimmy Snitzer or Jim Snitzer, was an American film actor. He was killed while serving with the United States Army in 1945.

== Life ==
James G. Snitzer was born in Cincinnati, Ohio in 1925 to Marie Donahue Snitzer and Louis A. Snitzer, a Hollywood agent, who represented such clients as actor Buster Crabbe. He had an older sister, Miriam Snitzer, who was an actress, and a brother, Louis T. Snitzer.

During his youth the Snitzer family lived in Cincinnati, but they eventually relocated to California and developed strong connections to the Hollywood film industry. The family resided on Benedict Canyon Road in Beverly Hills, California. Snitzer played numerous youthful film roles. In 1943, Snitzer graduated from Beverly Hills High School.

Snitzer enlisted in the United States Army at Fort MacArthur in San Pedro, California on 12 November 1943. In 1944 he was deployed to Europe as a member of the U.S. Army, 413th Infantry Regiment, 104th Infantry Division He reached the rank of Private First Class and had the service number 19203598. Snitzer was killed in action in Asbach, Rhineland-Palatinate, Germany on 22 March 1945.

He is buried at the Henri-Chapelle American Cemetery and Memorial in Henri-Chapelle, Belgium. He was posthumously awarded the Purple Heart.
