= Porsche Rennsport Reunion =

Automotive event organized by Porsche

The Porsche Rennsport Reunion is an automotive event and the world's largest meeting of classic Porsche racing cars and their drivers. Porsche has been organizing the Rennsport Reunion since 2001 to honor its own motorsport tradition. The event was conceived by British former racing driver Brian Redman and former Porsche Cars North America's press spokesperson Bob Carlson.

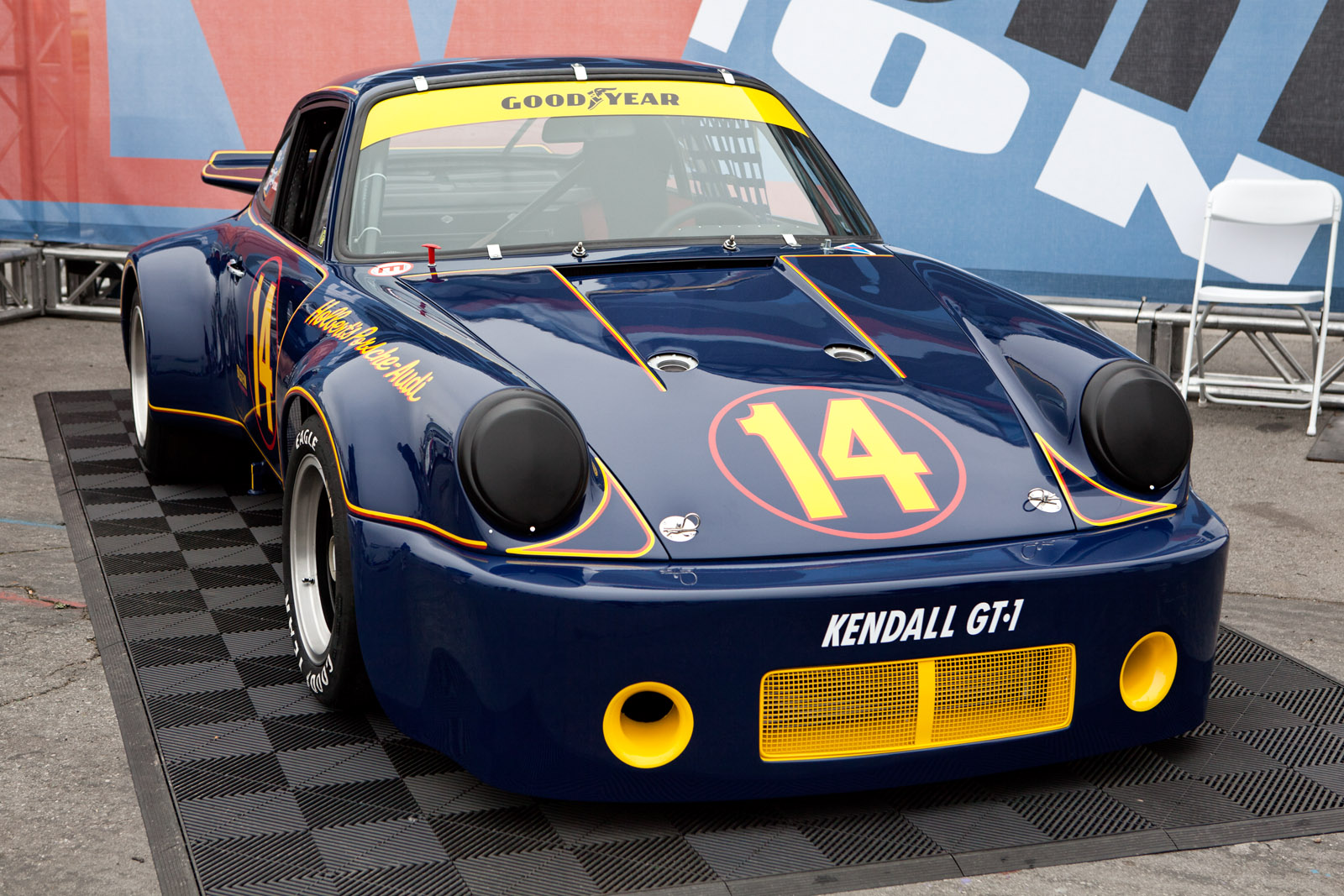
Al Holbert's 1974 Porsche 911 Carrera RSR 3.0 on static display at Porsche Rennsport Reunion IV

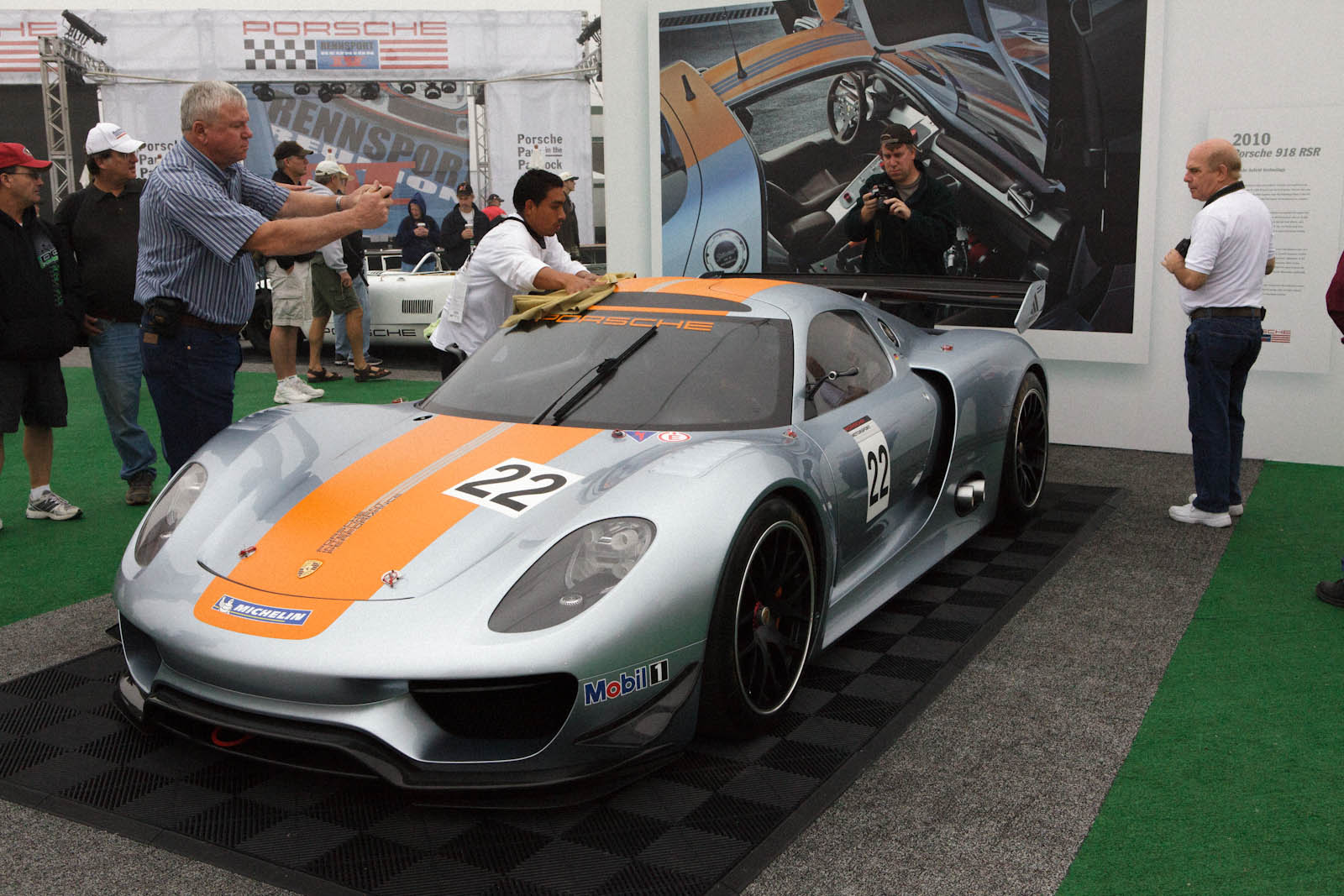
Porsche 918 RSR at Rennsport Reunion IV

== History ==
Rennsport Reunion is an event hosted since 2001 every three to five years in the United States. After the first three events were held on the east coast of the US, the event moved for Rennsport Reunion IV to the west coast in 2011.

=== Rennsport Reunion I ===
The first Porsche Rennsport Reunion event was held at Lime Rock Park, Connecticut in 2001.

=== Rennsport Reunion II ===
The Porsche Rennsport Reunion II was held at the Daytona International Speedway in 2004.

=== Rennsport Reunion III ===
The Porsche Rennsport Reunion III was held at the Daytona International Speedway in 2007.

=== Rennsport Reunion IV ===
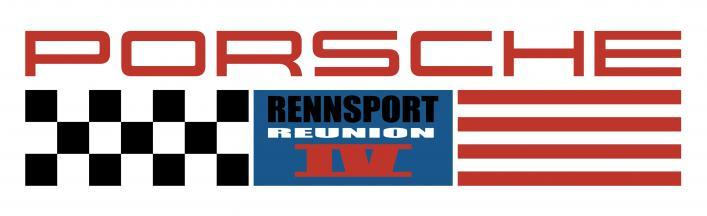
Porsche Rennsport Reunion IV logo

The Porsche Rennsport Reunion IV was held at Laguna Seca in Monterey, California in 2011.

=== Rennsport Reunion V ===
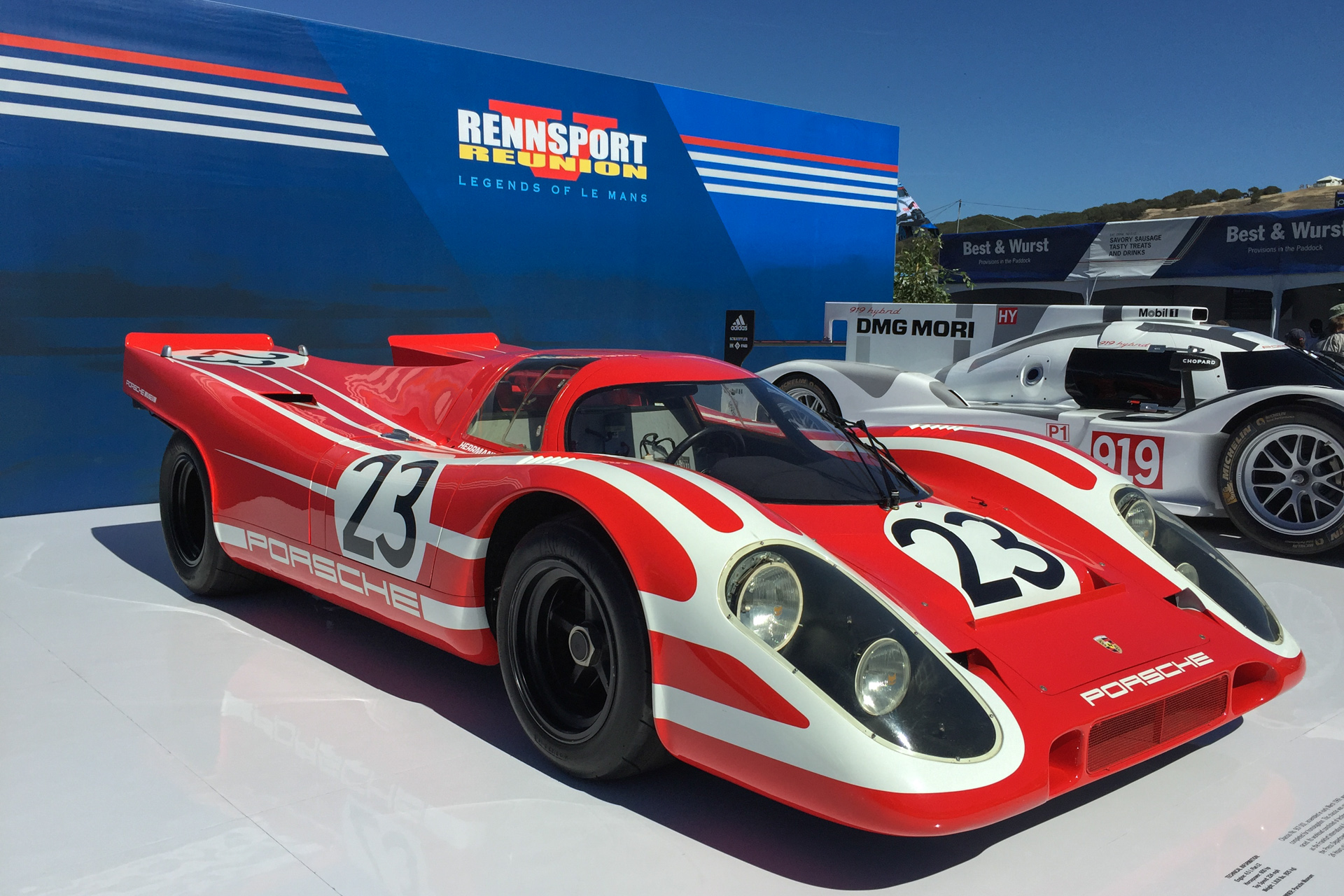
Porsche 917 at Rennsport Reunion V

The Porsche Rennsport Reunion V was held at Laguna Seca in Monterey, California in 2015.

=== Rennsport Reunion VI ===
The Porsche Rennsport Reunion VI was held at Laguna Seca in Monterey, California in September 2018 with 81,550 attendees.

=== Rennsport Reunion VII ===
The Porsche Rennsport Reunion VII was held at Laguna Seca in Monterey, California September 28 through October 1, 2023 with over 91,000 attendees. It was the largest Porsche-only event in history.
