= 1979 24 Hours of Daytona =

Previous: 1978	Next: 1980
Index: Races | Winners

The 17th Annual 24 Hour Pepsi Challenge Daytona was a 24-hour GT race held on February 3–4, 1979 at the Daytona International Speedway road course. The race served as the opening round of the 1979 World Championship for Makes, 1979 World Challenge for Endurance Drivers and the 1979 IMSA GTX, GTO and GTU Championships.

Victory overall and in the GTX class went to the No. 0 Interscope Racing run Porsche 935/79. The car was driven by team owner Ted Field and professional co-drivers Hurley Haywood and Danny Ongais. Over the 24 hours elapsed time of the race the Interscope Porsche completed 684 laps, covering 4,227 kilometres. The team dominated the race, winning by 49 laps, a distance of over 300 kilometres.

Second place was the GTO class winner, the No. 65 Ferrari 365 GTB/4 entered by Modena Sports Cars and driven by American racers John Morton and Tony Adamowicz. Third and 57 laps behind the winner was the No. 11 GTX Class Porsche 935 raced by another all-American team, Bruce Canepa, Rick Mears and Monte Shelton. Fourth and third in GTX was the No. 94 Whittington Brothers Racing Porsche 935/79 driven by the brothers Bill Whittington and Don Whittington and their German co-driver Jürgen Barth. They finished 62 laps behind the winning car.

Second in the GTO class was the No. 54 Porsche 911 Carrera RSR driven by Americans Tony Garcia and Alberto Vadia, and Cuban driver Juan Montalvo, 97 laps behind the winning Porsche and 48 laps behind the class winning Ferrari. A further 12 laps behind was third in class Porsche 911 Carrera RSR of Americans Robert Overby, Ash Tisdelle and team owner Lance Van Every.

The GTU class was won by the No. 7 Mazda Technical Center, debuting the Mazda RX-7 at Daytona. The car was driven by all-Japanese crew of Yoshimi Katayama, Yojiro Terada and Takashi Yorino. The Mazda finished fifth outright and 67 laps behind the winning Porsche. Teammates finished just two laps behind in the No. 77 Mazda RX-7 driven by Americans Walt Bohren, Amos Johnson and Roger Mandeville. Third and five laps further behind was the No. 60 Porsche 911 S of Americans Rusty Bond and Ren Tilton.

== Race results ==
Class winners denoted in bold and with ‡.

Pos	Class	No.	Team / Entrant	Drivers	Car	Laps
Pos	Class	No.	Team / Entrant	Drivers	Engine	Laps
1	**GTX**	**0**	**(United States) Interscope Racing**	**(United States) Ted Field (United States) Hurley Haywood (United States) Danny Ongais**	**Porsche 935/79**	**684 ‡**
1	**GTX**	**0**	**(United States) Interscope Racing**	**(United States) Ted Field (United States) Hurley Haywood (United States) Danny Ongais**	**Porsche Turbo Flat-6**	**684 ‡**
2	**GTO**	**65**	**(United States) Modena Sports Cars**	**(United States) Tony Adamowicz (United States) John Morton**	**Ferrari 365 GTB/4**	**635 ‡**
2	**GTO**	**65**	**(United States) Modena Sports Cars**	**(United States) Tony Adamowicz (United States) John Morton**	**Ferrari Tipo 251 4.4 L V12**	**635 ‡**
3	GTX	11	(United States) Bruce Canepa	(United States) Bruce Canepa (United States) Rick Mears (United States) Monte Shelton	Porsche 935	627
3	GTX	11	(United States) Bruce Canepa	(United States) Bruce Canepa (United States) Rick Mears (United States) Monte Shelton	Porsche Turbo Flat-6	627
4	GTX	94	(United States) Whittington Brothers Racing	(West Germany) Jürgen Barth (United States) Bill Whittington (United States) Don Whittington	Porsche 935/79	622
4	GTX	94	(United States) Whittington Brothers Racing	(West Germany) Jürgen Barth (United States) Bill Whittington (United States) Don Whittington	Porsche Turbo Flat-6	622
5	**GTU**	**7**	**(United States) Mazda Technical Center**	**(Japan) Yoshimi Katayama (Japan) Yojiro Terada (Japan) Takashi Yorino**	**Mazda RX-7**	**617 ‡**
5	**GTU**	**7**	**(United States) Mazda Technical Center**	**(Japan) Yoshimi Katayama (Japan) Yojiro Terada (Japan) Takashi Yorino**	**Mazda 13B 1.3 L Rotary**	**617 ‡**
6	GTU	77	(United States) Mazda Technical Center	(United States) Walt Bohren (United States) Amos Johnson (United States) Roger Mandeville	Mazda RX-7	615
6	GTU	77	(United States) Mazda Technical Center	(United States) Walt Bohren (United States) Amos Johnson (United States) Roger Mandeville	Mazda 13B 1.3 L Rotary	615
7	GTU	60	(United States) E. J. Pruitt & Sons	(United States) Rusty Bond (United States) Ren Tilton	Porsche 911 S	612
7	GTU	60	(United States) E. J. Pruitt & Sons	(United States) Rusty Bond (United States) Ren Tilton	Porsche 2.7 L Flat-6	612
8	GTO	54	(United States) Montura Ranch Estates	(United States) Tony Garcia (Cuba) Juan Montalvo (United States) Alberto Vadia	Porsche 911 Carrera RSR	587
8	GTO	54	(United States) Montura Ranch Estates	(United States) Tony Garcia (Cuba) Juan Montalvo (United States) Alberto Vadia	Porsche 3.0 L Flat-6	587
9	GTO	98	(United States) Van Every Racing	(United States) Robert Overby (United States) Ash Tisdelle (United States) Lance Van Every	Porsche 911 Carrera RSR	579
9	GTO	98	(United States) Van Every Racing	(United States) Robert Overby (United States) Ash Tisdelle (United States) Lance Van Every	Porsche 3.0 L Flat-6	579
10	GTO	03	(Switzerland) Lubrifilm Racing	(Switzerland) Enzo Calderari (Switzerland) Angelo Pallavicini (Switzerland) Marco Vanoli	Porsche 934	577
10	GTO	03	(Switzerland) Lubrifilm Racing	(Switzerland) Enzo Calderari (Switzerland) Angelo Pallavicini (Switzerland) Marco Vanoli	Porsche 3.0 L Turbo Flat-6	577
11	GTU	75	(Puerto Rico) Mike Ramirez	(Puerto Rico) Luis Gordillo (Puerto Rico) Mike Ramirez (Puerto Rico) Manuel Villa	Porsche 911	560
11	GTU	75	(Puerto Rico) Mike Ramirez	(Puerto Rico) Luis Gordillo (Puerto Rico) Mike Ramirez (Puerto Rico) Manuel Villa	Porsche Flat-6	560
12	GTO	37	(Colombia) Botero Racing	(Colombia) Jorge Cortes (Colombia) Honorato Espinosa (Colombia) Francisco Lopez	Porsche 911 Carrera RSR	551
12	GTO	37	(Colombia) Botero Racing	(Colombia) Jorge Cortes (Colombia) Honorato Espinosa (Colombia) Francisco Lopez	Porsche 3.0 L Flat-6	551
13	GTU	33	(United States) Peter Welter	(United States) Richard Aten (United States) Jack Refenning (United States) Peter Welter	Porsche 911	550
13	GTU	33	(United States) Peter Welter	(United States) Richard Aten (United States) Jack Refenning (United States) Peter Welter	Porsche Flat-6	550
14	GTO	58	(Puerto Rico) Diego Febles Racing	(Puerto Rico) Phil Currin (Puerto Rico) Diego Febles	Porsche 911 Carrera RSR	543
14	GTO	58	(Puerto Rico) Diego Febles Racing	(Puerto Rico) Phil Currin (Puerto Rico) Diego Febles	Porsche 3.0 L Flat-6	543
15 DNF	GTX	5	(United States) Budweiser Racing	(United States) Charles Mendez (United States) Paul Miller (United States) Johnny Rutherford	Porsche 935	529
15 DNF	GTX	5	(United States) Budweiser Racing	(United States) Charles Mendez (United States) Paul Miller (United States) Johnny Rutherford	Porsche Turbo Flat-6	529
16 DNF	GTU	27	(United States) Miami Auto Racing	(United States) Ray Mummery (United States) Luis Sereix (United States) Tom Sheehy	Porsche 911 S	522
16 DNF	GTU	27	(United States) Miami Auto Racing	(United States) Ray Mummery (United States) Luis Sereix (United States) Tom Sheehy	Porsche 2.7 L Flat-6	522
17 DNF	GTU	62	(United States) Koll Motorsports	(United States) Jim Cook (United States) Bill Koll	Porsche 914/6	511
17 DNF	GTU	62	(United States) Koll Motorsports	(United States) Jim Cook (United States) Bill Koll	Porsche 2.0 L Flat-6	511
18	GTO	95	(United States) Stephen E. Bond	(United States) Stephen Bond (United States) Philip Dann	Chevrolet Monza	509
18	GTO	95	(United States) Stephen E. Bond	(United States) Stephen Bond (United States) Philip Dann	Chevrolet 5.7 V8	509
19	GTO	21	(United States) Oftedahl Racing	(United States) Tom Bagley (United States) Carl Shafer (United States) John Wood	Chevrolet Camaro	493
19	GTO	21	(United States) Oftedahl Racing	(United States) Tom Bagley (United States) Carl Shafer (United States) John Wood	Chevrolet 5.7 V8	493
20	GTU	42	(United States) Bullwinkele Racing	(United States) Tom Ashby (United States) Bill Bean (United States) Bob Beasley	Porsche 911 S	493
20	GTU	42	(United States) Bullwinkele Racing	(United States) Tom Ashby (United States) Bill Bean (United States) Bob Beasley	Porsche 2.7 L Flat-6	493
21	GTU	08	(United States) Southern Racing Enterprises	(United States) Nort Northam (United States) Richard Weiss (United States) Terry Wolters	Porsche 911 S	488
21	GTU	08	(United States) Southern Racing Enterprises	(United States) Nort Northam (United States) Richard Weiss (United States) Terry Wolters	Porsche 2.7 L Flat-6	488
22	GTU	34	(United States) Drolsom Racing	(United States) George Drolsom (United States) Mark Greb (United States) John Maffucci	Porsche 911 S	482
22	GTU	34	(United States) Drolsom Racing	(United States) George Drolsom (United States) Mark Greb (United States) John Maffucci	Porsche 2.7 L Flat-6	482
23	GTO	64	(United States) Lenton B. McGill	(United States) Russ Boykin (United States) C. C. Canada (United States) Tom Ciccone	Chevrolet Camaro	458
23	GTO	64	(United States) Lenton B. McGill	(United States) Russ Boykin (United States) C. C. Canada (United States) Tom Ciccone	Chevrolet 5.7 V8	458
24	GTU	61	(United States) Faza Squadra	(Japan) Taku Akaike (United States) Al Cosentino (United States) Dick Starita	Mazda RX-3	444
24	GTU	61	(United States) Faza Squadra	(Japan) Taku Akaike (United States) Al Cosentino (United States) Dick Starita	Mazda 12A 1.1 L Rotary	444
25 DNF	GTU	8	(United States) Automobiles International Inc.	(United States) Anatoly Arutunoff (United States) José Marina (United States) Danny Sullivan	Lancia Stratos HF	439
25 DNF	GTU	8	(United States) Automobiles International Inc.	(United States) Anatoly Arutunoff (United States) José Marina (United States) Danny Sullivan	Ferrari Dino 2.4 L V6	439
26 DNF	GTX	94	(United States) Dick Barbour Racing	(United States) Dick Barbour (United States) Paul Newman (United Kingdom) Brian Redman	Porsche 935/77A	410
26 DNF	GTX	94	(United States) Dick Barbour Racing	(United States) Dick Barbour (United States) Paul Newman (United Kingdom) Brian Redman	Porsche Turbo Flat-6	410
27 DNF	GTO	80	(United States) Herb Adams	(United States) Herb Adams (United States) Peter Frey (United States) Louis Spoerl	Pontiac Firebird	408
27 DNF	GTO	80	(United States) Herb Adams	(United States) Herb Adams (United States) Peter Frey (United States) Louis Spoerl	Pontiac V8	408
28 DNF	GTU	17	(United States) Racing Beat	(United States) Jeff Kline (United States) Jim Mederer (United States) Don Sherman	Mazda RX-7	393
28 DNF	GTU	17	(United States) Racing Beat	(United States) Jeff Kline (United States) Jim Mederer (United States) Don Sherman	Mazda 13B 1.3 L Rotary	393
29 DNF	GTX	93	(United States) Whittington Brothers Racing	(United States) Preston Henn (United States) Dale Whittington (United States) R. D. Whittington	Porsche 934	389
29 DNF	GTX	93	(United States) Whittington Brothers Racing	(United States) Preston Henn (United States) Dale Whittington (United States) R. D. Whittington	Porsche 3.0 Turbo Flat-6	389
30 DNF	GTU	34	(United States) Bill Scott Racing	(United States) Pierre Honegger (United States) Mark Hutchins (United States) Bill Scott	Porsche 911	388
30 DNF	GTU	34	(United States) Bill Scott Racing	(United States) Pierre Honegger (United States) Mark Hutchins (United States) Bill Scott	Porsche Flat-6	388
31 DNF	GTU	40	(United States) Performance Specialists	(United States) William Koch (United States) Earl Roe (United States) Steve Southard	Porsche 914/6	385
31 DNF	GTU	40	(United States) Performance Specialists	(United States) William Koch (United States) Earl Roe (United States) Steve Southard	Porsche 2.0 L Flat-6	385
32 DNF	GTX	1	(West Germany) Gelo Racing Team	(United States) Peter Gregg (Belgium) Jacky Ickx (France) Bob Wollek	Porsche 935/77A	342
32 DNF	GTX	1	(West Germany) Gelo Racing Team	(United States) Peter Gregg (Belgium) Jacky Ickx (France) Bob Wollek	Porsche Turbo Flat-6	342
33 DNF	GTO	69	(Canada) Bytzek Automotive	(Canada) Rudy Bartling (Canada) Klaus Bytzek (Canada) Ludwig Heimrath	Porsche 911 Carrera RSR	335
33 DNF	GTO	69	(Canada) Bytzek Automotive	(Canada) Rudy Bartling (Canada) Klaus Bytzek (Canada) Ludwig Heimrath	Porsche 3.0 L Flat-6	335
34 DNF	GTO	29	(United States) Stratagraph Inc.	(United States) Billy Hagan (United States) Hoyt Overbagh (United States) Ron Reed	Chevrolet Monza	331
34 DNF	GTO	29	(United States) Stratagraph Inc.	(United States) Billy Hagan (United States) Hoyt Overbagh (United States) Ron Reed	Chevrolet 5.7 V8	331
35 DNF	GTU	89	(United States) Hamilton House Racing	(United States) Herb Forrest (United States) Joseph Hamilton (United States) Rob Hoskins	Porsche 911 S	329
35 DNF	GTU	89	(United States) Hamilton House Racing	(United States) Herb Forrest (United States) Joseph Hamilton (United States) Rob Hoskins	Porsche 2.7 L Flat-6	329
36 DNF	GTO	51	(United States) Casablanca Fan Co.	(United States) John Hotchkis (United States) Robert Kirby (United States) Howard Meister	Porsche 911 Carrera RSR	328
36 DNF	GTO	51	(United States) Casablanca Fan Co.	(United States) John Hotchkis (United States) Robert Kirby (United States) Howard Meister	Porsche 3.0 L Flat-6	328
37 DNF	GTO	15	(United States) Bavarian Motors International	(United States) Alf Gebhardt (United States) Sepp Grinbold	BMW 3.5 CSL	299
37 DNF	GTO	15	(United States) Bavarian Motors International	(United States) Alf Gebhardt (United States) Sepp Grinbold	BMW M49 3.5 L I6	299
38 DNF	GTO	81	(Venezuela) Performance Export	(Venezuela) Oscar Notz (Venezuela) Francisco Romero (Venezuela) Ernesto Soto	Porsche 911 Carrera RSR	241
38 DNF	GTO	81	(Venezuela) Performance Export	(Venezuela) Oscar Notz (Venezuela) Francisco Romero (Venezuela) Ernesto Soto	Porsche 3.0 L Flat-6	241
39 DNF	GTU	01	(United States) D. R. Racing	(United States) John Hamilton (United States) J. Kurt Roehrig (United States) Dave White	Porsche 911 S	223
39 DNF	GTU	01	(United States) D. R. Racing	(United States) John Hamilton (United States) J. Kurt Roehrig (United States) Dave White	Porsche 2.7 L Flat-6	223
40 DNF	GTX	13	(United States) Hal Shaw Racing	(Canada) Norm Ridgely (United States) Hal Shaw, Jr. (United States) Tom Spalding	Porsche 935	222
40 DNF	GTX	13	(United States) Hal Shaw Racing	(Canada) Norm Ridgely (United States) Hal Shaw, Jr. (United States) Tom Spalding	Porsche Turbo Flat-6	222
41 DNF	GTU	36	(United States) Case Racing	(United States) Ron Case (United States) Dave Panaccione	Porsche 911	210
41 DNF	GTU	36	(United States) Case Racing	(United States) Ron Case (United States) Dave Panaccione	Porsche Flat-6	210
42 DNF	GTX	53	(United States) Guy Thomas	(United States) Milton Moise (United States) Tom Nehl (United States) Guy Thomas	Chevrolet Camaro	201
42 DNF	GTX	53	(United States) Guy Thomas	(United States) Milton Moise (United States) Tom Nehl (United States) Guy Thomas	Chevrolet V8	201
43 DNF	GTO	06	(United States) Al Levenson	(United States) Gary Baker (United States) Lanny Hester (United States) Al Levenson	Chevrolet Corvette C2	197
43 DNF	GTO	06	(United States) Al Levenson	(United States) Gary Baker (United States) Lanny Hester (United States) Al Levenson	Chevrolet V8	197
44 DNF	GTX	23	(United States) Charlie Kemp	(United States) Carson Baird (United States) Charlie Kemp (Canada) Kees Nierop	Ford Mustang Cobra	168
44 DNF	GTX	23	(United States) Charlie Kemp	(United States) Carson Baird (United States) Charlie Kemp (Canada) Kees Nierop	Ford V8	168
45 DNF	GTX	3	(Italy) Jolly Club - Sportwagen Racing Team	(Italy) Carlo Facetti (Italy) Martino Finotto (Italy) Gianpiero Moretti	Porsche 935	164
45 DNF	GTX	3	(Italy) Jolly Club - Sportwagen Racing Team	(Italy) Carlo Facetti (Italy) Martino Finotto (Italy) Gianpiero Moretti	Porsche Turbo Flat-6	164
46 DNF	GTX	4	(West Germany) LM Joest Porsche	(West Germany) Reinhold Jöst (West Germany) Volkert Merl (West Germany) Rolf Stommelen	Porsche 935/77A	162
46 DNF	GTX	4	(West Germany) LM Joest Porsche	(West Germany) Reinhold Jöst (West Germany) Volkert Merl (West Germany) Rolf Stommelen	Porsche Turbo Flat-6	162
47 DNF	GTO	90	(United States) Bob's Speed Products	(United States) Rick Kump (United States) Bob Lee (United States) Sam Miller	AMC AMX	156
47 DNF	GTO	90	(United States) Bob's Speed Products	(United States) Rick Kump (United States) Bob Lee (United States) Sam Miller	AMC V8	156
48 DNF	GTO	12	(United States) Oftedahl Racing	(United States) Tom Bagley (United States) Joe Chamberlain (United States) Gerry Wellik	Chevrolet Camaro	147
48 DNF	GTO	12	(United States) Oftedahl Racing	(United States) Tom Bagley (United States) Joe Chamberlain (United States) Gerry Wellik	Chevrolet 5.7 V8	147
49 DNF	GTO	56	(United States) Peerless Racing	(United States) Craig Carter (Canada) Murray Edwards (United States) Richard Valentine	Chevrolet Camaro	144
49 DNF	GTO	56	(United States) Peerless Racing	(United States) Craig Carter (Canada) Murray Edwards (United States) Richard Valentine	Chevrolet 5.7 V8	144
50 DNF	GTX	2	(West Germany) Gelo Racing Team	(United Kingdom) John Fitzpatrick (Liechtenstein) Manfred Schurti (France) Bob Wollek	Porsche 935/77A	135
50 DNF	GTX	2	(West Germany) Gelo Racing Team	(United Kingdom) John Fitzpatrick (Liechtenstein) Manfred Schurti (France) Bob Wollek	Porsche Turbo Flat-6	135
51 DNF	GTU	57	(United States) John Tremblay	(United States) Bob Lapp (United States) John Tremblay	Datsun 240Z	118
51 DNF	GTU	57	(United States) John Tremblay	(United States) Bob Lapp (United States) John Tremblay	Datsun I6	118
52 DNF	GTX	9	(United States) Dick Barbour Racing	(United States) Bob Akin (United States) Rob McFarlin (United States) Roy Woods	Porsche 935	117
52 DNF	GTX	9	(United States) Dick Barbour Racing	(United States) Bob Akin (United States) Rob McFarlin (United States) Roy Woods	Porsche Turbo Flat-6	117
53 DNF	GTX	66	(France) JMS Racing-Pozzi	(France) Jean-Claude Andruet (France) Claude Ballot-Léna (Italy) Spartaco Dini	Ferrari 512 BB LM	103
53 DNF	GTX	66	(France) JMS Racing-Pozzi	(France) Jean-Claude Andruet (France) Claude Ballot-Léna (Italy) Spartaco Dini	Ferrari Tipo F102B 4.9 L Flat-12	103
54 DNF	GTX	67	(France) JMS Racing-Pozzi	(France) Jean-Claude Andruet (France) Claude Ballot-Léna (France) Michel Leclère	Ferrari 512 BB LM	101
54 DNF	GTX	67	(France) JMS Racing-Pozzi	(France) Jean-Claude Andruet (France) Claude Ballot-Léna (France) Michel Leclère	Ferrari Tipo F102B 4.9 L Flat-12	101
55 DNF	GTX	24	(United States) Graham Shaw	(United States) Graham Shaw (United States) Jerry Thompson (United States) Don Yenko	Chevrolet Monza	86
55 DNF	GTX	24	(United States) Graham Shaw	(United States) Graham Shaw (United States) Jerry Thompson (United States) Don Yenko	Chevrolet 5.7 V8	86
56 DNF	GTO	38	(Puerto Rico) Boricua Racing	(Puerto Rico) Bonky Fernandez (Puerto Rico) Tato Ferrer (Puerto Rico) Chiqui Soldevilla	Porsche 911 Carrera RSR	73
56 DNF	GTO	38	(Puerto Rico) Boricua Racing	(Puerto Rico) Bonky Fernandez (Puerto Rico) Tato Ferrer (Puerto Rico) Chiqui Soldevilla	Porsche 3.0 L Flat-6	73
57 DNF	GTX	68	(United States) North American Racing Team	(United States) Pat Bedard (France) Jean-Pierre Delaunay (United States) Bob Tullius	Ferrari 512 BB LM	72
57 DNF	GTX	68	(United States) North American Racing Team	(United States) Pat Bedard (France) Jean-Pierre Delaunay (United States) Bob Tullius	Ferrari Tipo F102B 4.9 L Flat-12	72
58 DNF	GTX	43	(United States) Meldeau Tire Co.	(United States) Stephen Behr (United States) Bill McDill	Chevrolet Camaro	59
58 DNF	GTX	43	(United States) Meldeau Tire Co.	(United States) Stephen Behr (United States) Bill McDill	Chevrolet V8	59
59 DNF	GTO	46	(Colombia) Mauricio De Narvaez	(Colombia) Mauricio De Narvaez (Colombia) Pedro De Narvaez (United States) Albert Naon	Porsche 911 Carrera RSR	46
59 DNF	GTO	46	(Colombia) Mauricio De Narvaez	(Colombia) Mauricio De Narvaez (Colombia) Pedro De Narvaez (United States) Albert Naon	Porsche 3.0 L Flat-6	46
60 DNF	GTO	07	(United States) Budweiser Racing	(United States) Dave Cowart (United States) David McClain (United States) Kenper Miller	Porsche 911 Carrera RSR	35
60 DNF	GTO	07	(United States) Budweiser Racing	(United States) Dave Cowart (United States) David McClain (United States) Kenper Miller	Porsche 3.0 L Flat-6	35
61 DNF	GTX	00	(United States) Interscope Racing	(United States) Ted Field (United States) Preston Henn (United States) Danny Ongais	Porsche 935/77A	29
61 DNF	GTX	00	(United States) Interscope Racing	(United States) Ted Field (United States) Preston Henn (United States) Danny Ongais	Porsche Turbo Flat-6	29
62 DNF	GTX	14	(United States) Bavarian Motors International	(United States) Steve Earle (United States) Steve Griswold (United States) Rick Knoop	BMW 3.0 CSL	25
62 DNF	GTX	14	(United States) Bavarian Motors International	(United States) Steve Earle (United States) Steve Griswold (United States) Rick Knoop	BMW M49 3.5 L I6	25
63 DNF	GTU	96	(United States) Gary Wonzer	(United States) George Van Arsdale (United States) Robert Whitaker (United States) Gary Wonzer	Triumph GT6	20
63 DNF	GTU	96	(United States) Gary Wonzer	(United States) George Van Arsdale (United States) Robert Whitaker (United States) Gary Wonzer	Triumph I6	20
64 DNF	GTU	48	(United States) Frank L. Leary III	(United States) Steve Cook (United States) Frank Leary (United States) Casey Mollett	Datsun 240Z	13
64 DNF	GTU	48	(United States) Frank L. Leary III	(United States) Steve Cook (United States) Frank Leary (United States) Casey Mollett	Datsun I6	13
65 DNF	GTX	18	(United States) JLP Racing	(United States) Al Holbert (United States) Michael Keyser (United States) John Paul	Porsche 935 JLP	12
65 DNF	GTX	18	(United States) JLP Racing	(United States) Al Holbert (United States) Michael Keyser (United States) John Paul	Porsche Turbo Flat-6	12
66 DNF	GTU	79	(United States) Sports Ltd. Racing	(United States) Bob Bergstrom (United States) Brad Frisselle	Mazda RX-7	9
66 DNF	GTU	79	(United States) Sports Ltd. Racing	(United States) Bob Bergstrom (United States) Brad Frisselle	Mazda 13B 1.3 L Rotary	9
67 DNF	GTX	73	(United States) Howey Farms	(United States) Clark Howey (United States) Dale Koch (United States) Tracy Wolf	Chevrolet Camaro	4
67 DNF	GTX	73	(United States) Howey Farms	(United States) Clark Howey (United States) Dale Koch (United States) Tracy Wolf	Chevrolet V8	4
DNS	GTU	63	(United States) Faza Squadra	(United States) Al Cosentino (Canada) Craig Fisher	Mazda RX-3	
DNS	GTU	63	(United States) Faza Squadra	(United States) Al Cosentino (Canada) Craig Fisher	Mazda 12A 1.1 L Rotary	
DNS	GTU	78	(United States) Associated Speed & Performance	(United States) Wiley Doran (United States) Neil Upchurch (United States) Ken Williams	Datsun 240Z	
DNS	GTU	78	(United States) Associated Speed & Performance	(United States) Wiley Doran (United States) Neil Upchurch (United States) Ken Williams	Datsun I6	

World Sportscar Championship
Previous race: none	1979 season	Next race: Drivers: 12 Hours of Sebring; Makes: 6 Hours of Mugello

IMSA GT Championship
Previous race: none	1979 season	Next race: 12 Hours of Sebring
