= 1980 24 Hours of Daytona =

Previous: 1979	Next: 1981
Index: Races | Winners

The 18th Annual 24 Hour Pepsi Challenge Daytona was a 24-hour GT race held on February 2–3, 1980 at the Daytona International Speedway road course. The race served as the opening round of the 1980 World Championship for Makes, 1980 World Challenge for Endurance Drivers and the 1980 IMSA GTX, GTO and GTU Championships.

Victory overall and in the GTX class went to the No. 2 Joest Racing run Porsche 935 J from Germany, driven by the all-German crew of Reinhold Jöst, Volkert Merl and Rolf Stommelen. Over the 24 hours elapsed time of the race the Joest Porsche completed 715 laps, covering 4,418 kilometres. The team won the race by 33 laps over the No. 09 Preston Henn run Porsche 935/77A driven by Al Holbert and John Paul. Another 18 laps behind was the No. 0 Porsche 935 K3/80 of Interscope Racing driven by Ted Field, Milt Minter and Danny Ongais.

Victory in the GTU Class and fifth outright was the No. 62 Porsche 914/6 driven by Jim Cook, Bill Koll and Greg LaCava by 14 laps over the No. 77 Mazda RX-7 of Jim Downing, Brad Frisselle and Roger Mandeville. Victory in the GTO class and sixth outright went to the No. 54 Montura Racing Porsche 911 Carrera RSR driven by Tony Garcia, Terry Herman and Alberto Vadia by a single lap over the Colombian No. 46 DeNarvaez Racing Porsche 911 Carrera RSR driven by Mauricio DeNarvaez, Ricardo Londoño and Albert Naon.

== Race results ==
Class winners denoted in bold and with ‡.

Pos	Class	No.	Team / Entrant	Drivers	Car	Laps
Pos	Class	No.	Team / Entrant	Drivers	Engine	Laps
1	**GTX**	**2**	**(West Germany) Joest Racing**	**(West Germany) Reinhold Jöst (West Germany) Volkert Merl (West Germany) Rolf Stommelen**	**Porsche 935 J**	**715 ‡**
1	**GTX**	**2**	**(West Germany) Joest Racing**	**(West Germany) Reinhold Jöst (West Germany) Volkert Merl (West Germany) Rolf Stommelen**	**Porsche 2.8 L Twin-turbo Flat-6**	**715 ‡**
2	GTX	09	(United States) Thunderbird Swap Shops	(United States) John Paul (United States) Al Holbert; DNS: (United States) Preston Henn	Porsche 935/77A	682
2	GTX	09	(United States) Thunderbird Swap Shops	(United States) John Paul (United States) Al Holbert; DNS: (United States) Preston Henn	Porsche Turbo Flat-6	682
3	GTX	0	(United States) Interscope Racing	(United States) Ted Field (United States) Milt Minter (United States) Danny Ongais	Porsche 935 K3/80	664
3	GTX	0	(United States) Interscope Racing	(United States) Ted Field (United States) Milt Minter (United States) Danny Ongais	Porsche Turbo Flat-6	664
4	GTX	80	(Canada) All Canadian Racing	(Canada) Maurice Carter (United States) Craig Carter (Canada) Murray Edwards	Chevrolet Camaro	639
4	GTX	80	(Canada) All Canadian Racing	(Canada) Maurice Carter (United States) Craig Carter (Canada) Murray Edwards	Chevrolet 7.0 V8	639
5	**GTU**	**62**	**(United States) William J. Koll**	**(United States) Bill Koll (United States) Jim Cook (United States) Greg LaCava**	**Porsche 914/6**	**632 ‡**
5	**GTU**	**62**	**(United States) William J. Koll**	**(United States) Bill Koll (United States) Jim Cook (United States) Greg LaCava**	**Porsche 2.0 L Flat-6**	**632 ‡**
6	**GTO**	**54**	**(United States) Montura Racing**	**(United States) Tony Garcia (United States) Terry Herman (United States) Alberto Vadia**	**Porsche 911 Carrera RSR**	**630 ‡**
6	**GTO**	**54**	**(United States) Montura Racing**	**(United States) Tony Garcia (United States) Terry Herman (United States) Alberto Vadia**	**Porsche 3.0 L Flat-6**	**630 ‡**
7	GTO	46	(Colombia) DeNarvaez Racing	(Colombia) Mauricio DeNarvaez (Colombia) Ricardo Londoño (Colombia) Albert Naon	Porsche 911 Carrera RSR	629
7	GTO	46	(Colombia) DeNarvaez Racing	(Colombia) Mauricio DeNarvaez (Colombia) Ricardo Londoño (Colombia) Albert Naon	Porsche 3.0 L Flat-6	629
8	GTU	77	(United States) Roger Mandeville	(United States) Roger Mandeville (United States) Jim Downing (United States) Brad Frisselle	Mazda RX-7	618
8	GTU	77	(United States) Roger Mandeville	(United States) Roger Mandeville (United States) Jim Downing (United States) Brad Frisselle	Mazda 1.3 L Rotary	618
9	GTX	9	(United States) Dick Barbour Racing	(United States) Bob Garretson (United States) Skeeter McKitterick (France) Anny-Charlotte Verney	Porsche 935 K3	599
9	GTX	9	(United States) Dick Barbour Racing	(United States) Bob Garretson (United States) Skeeter McKitterick (France) Anny-Charlotte Verney	Porsche 3.2 L Twin-turbo Flat-6	599
10	GTX	4	(Italy) Jolly Club	(Italy) Carlo Facetti (Italy) Martino Finotto; DNS: (Italy) Gianfranco Ricci	Lancia Montecarlo Turbo	597
10	GTX	4	(Italy) Jolly Club	(Italy) Carlo Facetti (Italy) Martino Finotto; DNS: (Italy) Gianfranco Ricci	Lancia Lampedri 1.4 L Turbo I4	597
11	GTX	59	(United States) Brumos Porsche Audi	(United States) Peter Gregg (United States) Hurley Haywood (United States) Bruce Leven	Porsche 935/79	584
11	GTX	59	(United States) Brumos Porsche Audi	(United States) Peter Gregg (United States) Hurley Haywood (United States) Bruce Leven	Porsche Turbo Flat-6	584
12	GTU	73	(United States) Z&W Enterprises	(United States) Fred Apgar (United States) Pierre Honegger (United States) Mark Hutchins	Mazda RX-7	546
12	GTU	73	(United States) Z&W Enterprises	(United States) Fred Apgar (United States) Pierre Honegger (United States) Mark Hutchins	Mazda Rotary	546
13	GTO	89	(Venezuela) Hector Huerta	(Belgium) Jean-Paul Libert (Venezuela) Francisco Romero (Venezuela) Ernesto Soto	Porsche 911 Carrera RSR	544
13	GTO	89	(Venezuela) Hector Huerta	(Belgium) Jean-Paul Libert (Venezuela) Francisco Romero (Venezuela) Ernesto Soto	Porsche 3.0 L Flat-6	544
14 DNF	GTO	65	(United States) Nicholas/McRoberts Racing	(United States) Tony Adamowicz (United States) John Morton	Ferrari 365 GTB/4	539
14 DNF	GTO	65	(United States) Nicholas/McRoberts Racing	(United States) Tony Adamowicz (United States) John Morton	Ferrari Tipo 251 4.4 L V12	539
15	GTU	78	(United States) Revolution Wheels	(United States) Robert Giesel (United States) Alan Johnson (United States) Bruce Nesbitt	Mazda RX-2	533
15	GTU	78	(United States) Revolution Wheels	(United States) Robert Giesel (United States) Alan Johnson (United States) Bruce Nesbitt	Mazda 1.3 L Rotary	533
16 DSQ	GTX	93	(United States) Whittington Brothers Racing	(United States) Bill Whittington (United States) Dale Whittington (United States) Don Whittington	Porsche 935 K3	509
16 DSQ	GTX	93	(United States) Whittington Brothers Racing	(United States) Bill Whittington (United States) Dale Whittington (United States) Don Whittington	Porsche 3.2 L Turbo Flat-6	509
17	GTU	81	(United States) Trinity Racing	(United States) Lyn St. James (United States) Mark Welch (United States) Tom Winters	Mazda RX-7	498
17	GTU	81	(United States) Trinity Racing	(United States) Lyn St. James (United States) Mark Welch (United States) Tom Winters	Mazda Rotary	498
18	GTU	08	(United States) Moran Construction	(United States) M. L. Speer (United States) Ray Ratcliff (United States) Terry Wolters	Porsche 911 SC	489
18	GTU	08	(United States) Moran Construction	(United States) M. L. Speer (United States) Ray Ratcliff (United States) Terry Wolters	Porsche 3.0 L Flat-6	489
19	GTU	57	(United States) Independent Personalized	(United States) Wayne Baker (United States) Dan Gilliland (United States) Jeff Scott	Porsche 914/4	486
19	GTU	57	(United States) Independent Personalized	(United States) Wayne Baker (United States) Dan Gilliland (United States) Jeff Scott	Volkswagen 411E 1.6 L Flat-4	486
20	GTU	82	(United States) Trinity Racing	(United States) John Casey (United States) Steve Dietrich (United States) Lee Mueller	Mazda RX-7	483
20	GTU	82	(United States) Trinity Racing	(United States) John Casey (United States) Steve Dietrich (United States) Lee Mueller	Mazda Rotary	483
21	GTO	10	(United States) Oftedahl Trucking	(United States) Dave Heinz (United States) Gerry Wellik (United States) Bob Young	Chevrolet Camaro	476
21	GTO	10	(United States) Oftedahl Trucking	(United States) Dave Heinz (United States) Gerry Wellik (United States) Bob Young	Chevrolet 5.7 V8	476
22	GTO	22	(United States) Group Bruckmann	(United States) Volker Bruckmann (United States) Rug Cunningham (United States) David Goodell	Porsche 911 Carrera RSR	464
22	GTO	22	(United States) Group Bruckmann	(United States) Volker Bruckmann (United States) Rug Cunningham (United States) David Goodell	Porsche 3.0 L Flat-6	464
23	GTO	37	(Colombia) Botero Racing	(Colombia) Jorge Cortés (Colombia) Honorato Espinosa (Colombia) Francisco López	Porsche 911 Carrera RSR	457
23	GTO	37	(Colombia) Botero Racing	(Colombia) Jorge Cortés (Colombia) Honorato Espinosa (Colombia) Francisco López	Porsche 3.0 L Flat-6	457
24 DNF	GTU	39	(United States) JLC Racing	(United States) Stu Fisher (United States) Amos Johnson (Canada) Allan Moffat; DNS: (United States) Brad Frisselle	Mazda RX-7	440
24 DNF	GTU	39	(United States) JLC Racing	(United States) Stu Fisher (United States) Amos Johnson (Canada) Allan Moffat; DNS: (United States) Brad Frisselle	Mazda Rotary	440
25 DNF	GTO	28	(United States) Tom Nehl	(United States) Tom Nehl (United States) Peter Kirill (United States) Kathy Rude	Chevrolet Camaro	435
25 DNF	GTO	28	(United States) Tom Nehl	(United States) Tom Nehl (United States) Peter Kirill (United States) Kathy Rude	Chevrolet 5.7 V8	435
26 DNF	GTO	37	(United States) T&R Racing	(Dominican Republic) Luis Méndez (United States) Tico Almeida (United States) Rene Rodriguez	Porsche 911 Carrera RSR	423
26 DNF	GTO	37	(United States) T&R Racing	(Dominican Republic) Luis Méndez (United States) Tico Almeida (United States) Rene Rodriguez	Porsche 3.0 L Flat-6	423
27	GTO	15	(West Germany) Bavarian Motors International	(West Germany) Bruno Beilcke (United States) Alf Gebhardt; DNS (West Germany) Helmut Trieb	BMW 3.5 CSL	420
27	GTO	15	(West Germany) Bavarian Motors International	(West Germany) Bruno Beilcke (United States) Alf Gebhardt; DNS (West Germany) Helmut Trieb	BMW M49 4.5 L I6	420
28	GTO	92	(United States) The Cummings Marque	(United States) Don Cummings (United States) Guido Levetto	Shelby GT350	410
28	GTO	92	(United States) The Cummings Marque	(United States) Don Cummings (United States) Guido Levetto	Ford V8	410
29	GTX	6	(United States) Dick Barbour Racing	(United States) Dick Barbour (United Kingdom) John Fitzpatrick (Liechtenstein) Manfred Schurti	Porsche 935 K3/80	405
29	GTX	6	(United States) Dick Barbour Racing	(United States) Dick Barbour (United Kingdom) John Fitzpatrick (Liechtenstein) Manfred Schurti	Porsche 3.2 L Twin-turbo Flat-6	405
30 DNF	GTO	71	(United States) Keirn Garage	(United States) Philip Keirn (United States) Ed Errington (United States) Larry Trotter	Chevrolet Corvette C3	402
30 DNF	GTO	71	(United States) Keirn Garage	(United States) Philip Keirn (United States) Ed Errington (United States) Larry Trotter	Chevrolet V8	402
31	GTX	76	(United States) Arrow Heating Co.	(United States) Joe Chamberlain (United States) John Chamberlain (United States) Richard Valentine	Chevrolet Corvette C3	393
31	GTX	76	(United States) Arrow Heating Co.	(United States) Joe Chamberlain (United States) John Chamberlain (United States) Richard Valentine	Chevrolet 7.0 L V8	393
32 DNF	GTO	85	(Canada) David Deacon	(Canada) Jacques Bienvenue (Canada) David Deacon (Canada) Peter Moennick	Porsche 911 Carrera RSR	375
32 DNF	GTO	85	(Canada) David Deacon	(Canada) Jacques Bienvenue (Canada) David Deacon (Canada) Peter Moennick	Porsche 3.0 L Flat-6	375
33	GTU	06	(United States) Intrepid, Inc.	(United States) Joe DiBattista (United States) Tom Ciccone (United States) Alan Howes	Porsche 911	358
33	GTU	06	(United States) Intrepid, Inc.	(United States) Joe DiBattista (United States) Tom Ciccone (United States) Alan Howes	Porsche Flat-6	358
34 DNF	GTU	79	(United States) Sports Ltd. Racing	(United States) Pat Bedard (United States) Bob Bergstrom	Mazda RX-7	355
34 DNF	GTU	79	(United States) Sports Ltd. Racing	(United States) Pat Bedard (United States) Bob Bergstrom	Mazda Rotary	355
35	GTO	56	(United States) Rick Borlase	(United States) Rick Borlase (United States) Michael Hammond (United States) Don Kravig	Porsche 911 Carrera	348
35	GTO	56	(United States) Rick Borlase	(United States) Rick Borlase (United States) Michael Hammond (United States) Don Kravig	Porsche Flat-6	348
36 DNF	GTX	69	(United States) Preston Henn	(United States) Preston Henn (Belgium) Pierre Dieudonné	Ferrari 512 BB LM	341
36 DNF	GTX	69	(United States) Preston Henn	(United States) Preston Henn (Belgium) Pierre Dieudonné	Ferrari Tipo F102B 4.9 L Flat-12	341
37 DNF	GTO	24	(United States) American Racing Team	(United States) Ray Mummery (United States) Jack Refenning (United States) Ren Tilton	Porsche 934	337
37 DNF	GTO	24	(United States) American Racing Team	(United States) Ray Mummery (United States) Jack Refenning (United States) Ren Tilton	Porsche 3.0 L Turbo Flat-6	337
38 DNF	GTU	52	(United States) Snowmobile Racing	(United States) Tom Cripe (United States) Joseph Hamilton (United States) Fred Snow	Porsche 911 S	301
38 DNF	GTU	52	(United States) Snowmobile Racing	(United States) Tom Cripe (United States) Joseph Hamilton (United States) Fred Snow	Porsche Flat-6	301
39 DNF	GTX	5	(United States) Racing Associates	(United States) Charles Mendez (United States) Paul Miller (United Kingdom) Brian Redman	Porsche 935 K3	290
39 DNF	GTX	5	(United States) Racing Associates	(United States) Charles Mendez (United States) Paul Miller (United Kingdom) Brian Redman	Porsche Twin-turbo Flat-6	290
40 DNF	GTO	96	(United States) NTS Racing	(United States) William Coykendall (United States) Bob Earl (United States) Fred Stiff	Datsun 240Z	281
40 DNF	GTO	96	(United States) NTS Racing	(United States) William Coykendall (United States) Bob Earl (United States) Fred Stiff	Datsun I6	281
41 DNF	GTO	42	(United States) Dick Neland	(United States) Dick Neland (United States) Joe Cotrone (United States) Bill Ferran	Chevrolet Camaro	270
41 DNF	GTO	42	(United States) Dick Neland	(United States) Dick Neland (United States) Joe Cotrone (United States) Bill Ferran	Chevrolet 5.7 V8	270
42 DNF	GTU	95	(Puerto Rico) Mike Ramirez Racing	(Puerto Rico) Mike Ramirez (Puerto Rico) Luis Gordillo (Puerto Rico) Manuel Villa	Porsche 911	263
42 DNF	GTU	95	(Puerto Rico) Mike Ramirez Racing	(Puerto Rico) Mike Ramirez (Puerto Rico) Luis Gordillo (Puerto Rico) Manuel Villa	Porsche Flat-6	263
43 DNF	GTX	11	(United Kingdom) March Engineering	(United Kingdom) Ian Grob (West Germany) Michael Korten (Belgium) Patrick Nève	March-BMW M1/C	260
43 DNF	GTX	11	(United Kingdom) March Engineering	(United Kingdom) Ian Grob (West Germany) Michael Korten (Belgium) Patrick Nève	BMW M88 3.5 L I6	260
44 DNF	GTU	70	(United States) Herman Racing	(United States) Chris Doyle (United States) Charles Guest (United States) Mike Meyer	Mazda RX-7	250
44 DNF	GTU	70	(United States) Herman Racing	(United States) Chris Doyle (United States) Charles Guest (United States) Mike Meyer	Mazda Rotary	250
45 DNF	GTX	13	(United States) Andial Racing	(United States) Elliot Forbes-Robinson (United States) Howard Meister (United States) Randolph Townsend	Porsche 935 K3	233
45 DNF	GTX	13	(United States) Andial Racing	(United States) Elliot Forbes-Robinson (United States) Howard Meister (United States) Randolph Townsend	Porsche Twin-turbo Flat-6	233
46 DNF	GTO	32	(El Salvador) Scorpio Racing	(El Salvador) Eduardo Barrientos (El Salvador) Enrique Molins (El Salvador) Carlos Pineda	Porsche 911 Carrera RSR	233
46 DNF	GTO	32	(El Salvador) Scorpio Racing	(El Salvador) Eduardo Barrientos (El Salvador) Enrique Molins (El Salvador) Carlos Pineda	Porsche 3.0 L Flat-6	233
47 DNF	GTX	25	(United States) Deren Automotive	(Belgium) Christine Beckers (United States) Dave Cowart (United States) Kenper Miller	BMW M1	222
47 DNF	GTX	25	(United States) Deren Automotive	(Belgium) Christine Beckers (United States) Dave Cowart (United States) Kenper Miller	BMW M88 3.5 L I6	222
48 DNF	GTX	55	(United States) Racing Associates	(France) Claude Ballot-Léna (France) Gérard Bleynie (United States) Ralph Kent-Cooke	Porsche 935	217
48 DNF	GTX	55	(United States) Racing Associates	(France) Claude Ballot-Léna (France) Gérard Bleynie (United States) Ralph Kent-Cooke	Porsche Twin-turbo Flat-6	217
49 DNF	GTO	38	(Puerto Rico) Boricua Racing	(Puerto Rico) Bonky Fernandez (Puerto Rico) Tato Ferrer (Canada) Kees Nierop	Porsche 911 Carrera RSR	211
49 DNF	GTO	38	(Puerto Rico) Boricua Racing	(Puerto Rico) Bonky Fernandez (Puerto Rico) Tato Ferrer (Canada) Kees Nierop	Porsche 3.0 L Flat-6	211
50 DNF	GTX	19	(United States) Chris Cord Racing	(United States) Jim Adams (United States) Chris Cord; DNS: (United States) Dick Ferguson	Chevrolet Monza	188
50 DNF	GTX	19	(United States) Chris Cord Racing	(United States) Jim Adams (United States) Chris Cord; DNS: (United States) Dick Ferguson	Chevrolet 6.0 L V8	188
51 DNF	GTX	94	(United States) Whittington Brothers Racing	(West Germany) Axel Plankenhorn (United States) Dale Whittington	Porsche 935/79	179
51 DNF	GTX	94	(United States) Whittington Brothers Racing	(West Germany) Axel Plankenhorn (United States) Dale Whittington	Porsche Turbo Flat-6	179
52 DNF	GTO	44	(United States) Group 44	(United States) Bob Tullius (United States) John Kelly (United States) John McComb	Triumph TR8	171
52 DNF	GTO	44	(United States) Group 44	(United States) Bob Tullius (United States) John Kelly (United States) John McComb	Rover 3.9 L V8	171
53 DNF	GTO	75	(United States) Show Cars of Florida	(United States) Stephen Bond (United States) Billy Hagan (United States) Dale Kreider	Chevrolet Corvette C3	170
53 DNF	GTO	75	(United States) Show Cars of Florida	(United States) Stephen Bond (United States) Billy Hagan (United States) Dale Kreider	Chevrolet V8	170
54 DNF	GTX	05	(United States) Racing Associates	(United States) Bob Akin (United States) Bobby Rahal (United States) Roy Woods	Porsche 935 K3	156
54 DNF	GTX	05	(United States) Racing Associates	(United States) Bob Akin (United States) Bobby Rahal (United States) Roy Woods	Porsche Twin-turbo Flat-6	156
55 DNF	GTO	51	(United States) Moana Corp.	(United States) Robert Kirby (United States) John Hotchkis (United States) John Hotchkis, Jr.	Porsche 911 Carrera RSR	147
55 DNF	GTO	51	(United States) Moana Corp.	(United States) Robert Kirby (United States) John Hotchkis (United States) John Hotchkis, Jr.	Porsche 3.0 L Flat-6	147
56 DNF	GTX	3	(United States) Jim Busby Racing	(United States) Jim Busby (United States) Bruce Jenner (United States) Rick Knoop	March-BMW M1/C	139
56 DNF	GTX	3	(United States) Jim Busby Racing	(United States) Jim Busby (United States) Bruce Jenner (United States) Rick Knoop	BMW M88 3.5 L I6	139
57 DNF	GTU	23	(United States) Frank L. Carney	(United States) Frank Carney (United States) Dick Davenport (United States) Don Devendorf	Datsun 280ZX	109
57 DNF	GTU	23	(United States) Frank L. Carney	(United States) Frank Carney (United States) Dick Davenport (United States) Don Devendorf	Nissan L28E 2.8 L I6	109
58	GTO	99	(United States) Full-Time Racing	(United States) Phil Currin	Chevrolet Corvette C3	89
58	GTO	99	(United States) Full-Time Racing	(United States) Phil Currin	Chevrolet V8	89
59 DNF	GTX	30	(Italy) Electrodyne	(Italy) Gianpiero Moretti (United States) Bruce Canepa (Italy) Fernando Cazzaniga	Porsche 935 J	72
59 DNF	GTX	30	(Italy) Electrodyne	(Italy) Gianpiero Moretti (United States) Bruce Canepa (Italy) Fernando Cazzaniga	Porsche 3.2 L Twin-turbo Flat-6	72
60 DNF	GTO	58	(Puerto Rico) Coco Lopez-Piña Colada	(Puerto Rico) Diego Febles (Puerto Rico) Mandy Gonzalez (Puerto Rico) Chiqui Soldevilla	Porsche 911 Carrera RSR	60
60 DNF	GTO	58	(Puerto Rico) Coco Lopez-Piña Colada	(Puerto Rico) Diego Febles (Puerto Rico) Mandy Gonzalez (Puerto Rico) Chiqui Soldevilla	Porsche 3.0 L Flat-6	60
61 DNF	GTO	16	(United States) Yenko Chevrolet-Honda	(United States) Kim Mason (United States) Jerry Thompson (United States) Don Yenko	Chevrolet Corvette C3	56
61 DNF	GTO	16	(United States) Yenko Chevrolet-Honda	(United States) Kim Mason (United States) Jerry Thompson (United States) Don Yenko	Chevrolet V8	56
62 DNF	GTU	17	(United States) Racing Beat	(United States) Dennis Aase (United States) Walt Bohren (United States) Jeff Kline	Mazda RX-7	51
62 DNF	GTU	17	(United States) Racing Beat	(United States) Dennis Aase (United States) Walt Bohren (United States) Jeff Kline	Mazda Rotary	51
63 DNF	GTO	03	(United States) Toyota Village	(Canada) Rudy Bartling (United States) Werner Frank (Switzerland) Angelo Pallavicini	Porsche 934	51
63 DNF	GTO	03	(United States) Toyota Village	(Canada) Rudy Bartling (United States) Werner Frank (Switzerland) Angelo Pallavicini	Porsche 3.0 L Turbo Flat-6	51
64 DNF	GTU	83	(United States) Zotz Garage	(United States) John Belperche (United States) Doug Zitza (United States) Harro Zitza	Porsche 914/6	44
64 DNF	GTU	83	(United States) Zotz Garage	(United States) John Belperche (United States) Doug Zitza (United States) Harro Zitza	Porsche 2.0 L Flat-6	44
65 DNF	GTO	63	(United States) Guy Thomas	(United States) Hugh Davenport (United States) Nort Northam (United States) Guy Thomas	Chevrolet Camaro	29
65 DNF	GTO	63	(United States) Guy Thomas	(United States) Hugh Davenport (United States) Nort Northam (United States) Guy Thomas	Chevrolet 5.7 V8	29
66 DNF	GTX	07	(Canada) Heimrath Racing	(Canada) Ludwig Heimrath (El Salvador) Carlos Moran (United States) Johnny Rutherford	Porsche 935	24
66 DNF	GTX	07	(Canada) Heimrath Racing	(Canada) Ludwig Heimrath (El Salvador) Carlos Moran (United States) Johnny Rutherford	Porsche Twin-turbo Flat-6	24
67 DNF	GTU	18	(United States) Automobile International	(United States) Anatoly Arutunoff (United States) George Drolsom (United States) José Marina	Lancia Stratos HF	20
67 DNF	GTU	18	(United States) Automobile International	(United States) Anatoly Arutunoff (United States) George Drolsom (United States) José Marina	Ferrari Dino 2.4 L V6	20
68 DNF	GTO	88	(United States) Herb Adams VSE	(United States) Herb Adams (United States) Walker Evans (United States) Kenny Roberts	Pontiac Firebird	0
68 DNF	GTO	88	(United States) Herb Adams VSE	(United States) Herb Adams (United States) Walker Evans (United States) Kenny Roberts	Pontiac V8	0
DNQ	GTX	00	(United States) Interscope Racing	(United States) Ted Field (United States) Milt Minter (United States) Danny Ongais	Porsche 935/77A	
DNQ	GTX	00	(United States) Interscope Racing	(United States) Ted Field (United States) Milt Minter (United States) Danny Ongais	Porsche Turbo Flat-6	
DNQ	GTX	14	(United States) Renaissance Group Racing	(Belgium) Pierre Dieudonné (Peru) Jorge Koechlin (South Africa) Leon Walger	Porsche 935	
DNQ	GTX	14	(United States) Renaissance Group Racing	(Belgium) Pierre Dieudonné (Peru) Jorge Koechlin (South Africa) Leon Walger	Porsche Turbo Flat-6	
DNS	GTO	8	(United States) Bob Beasley	(United States) Bob Beasley (United States) Chuck Grantham (United States) George Stone	Porsche 911 Carrera RSR	
DNS	GTO	8	(United States) Bob Beasley	(United States) Bob Beasley (United States) Chuck Grantham (United States) George Stone	Porsche 3.0 L Flat-6	
DNS	GTO	98	(United States) Van Every Racing	(United States) Bill Johnson (United States) Ash Tisdelle (United States) Lance Van Every	Porsche 911 Carrera RSR	
DNS	GTO	98	(United States) Van Every Racing	(United States) Bill Johnson (United States) Ash Tisdelle (United States) Lance Van Every	Porsche 3.0 L Flat-6	
DNQ	GTU	01	(United States) Roehrig Racing	(Canada) Francois Laurin (United States) J. Kurt Roehrig (United States) Dave White	BMW 320i	
DNQ	GTU	01	(United States) Roehrig Racing	(Canada) Francois Laurin (United States) J. Kurt Roehrig (United States) Dave White	BMW M10 2.0 L I4	
DNQ	GTU	12	(United States) Sidney Smith III	(United States) Sidney Smith (United States) Tommy Johnson (United States) Karl Schoepflin	Porsche 914/6	
DNQ	GTU	12	(United States) Sidney Smith III	(United States) Sidney Smith (United States) Tommy Johnson (United States) Karl Schoepflin	Porsche 2.0 L Flat-6	
DNQ	GTU	33	(United States) A-10 Racing	(United States) Richard Aten (United States) Jack Refenning (United States) Peter Welter	Porsche 911	
DNQ	GTU	33	(United States) A-10 Racing	(United States) Richard Aten (United States) Jack Refenning (United States) Peter Welter	Porsche Flat-6	
DNQ	GTU	35	(United States) Janis Taylor	(United States) Vic Provenzano (United States) Rex Ramsey (United States) Del Russo Taylor	Alfa Romeo Alfetta GTV	
DNQ	GTU	35	(United States) Janis Taylor	(United States) Vic Provenzano (United States) Rex Ramsey (United States) Del Russo Taylor	Alfa Romeo Twin Cam 2.0 L I4	
DNS	GTO	49	(United States) Tortilla Flats Racing	(United States) Bob Copeman (United States) Jerry Demele (Australia) Warwick Henderson	Porsche 911 Carrera RSR	
DNS	GTO	49	(United States) Tortilla Flats Racing	(United States) Bob Copeman (United States) Jerry Demele (Australia) Warwick Henderson	Porsche 3.0 L Flat-6	
DNS	GTX	91	(United States) Grand Prix International	(United States) Kerry Mitt (United States) Bob Pearl (United States) Richard Valentine	Chevrolet Corvette C3	
DNS	GTX	91	(United States) Grand Prix International	(United States) Kerry Mitt (United States) Bob Pearl (United States) Richard Valentine	Chevrolet V8	

World Sportscar Championship
Previous race: none	1980 season	Next race: Drivers: 12 Hours of Sebring; Makes: 1000 km Brands Hatch

IMSA GT Championship
Previous race: none	1980 season	Next race: 12 Hours of Sebring
