= Dick Barbour =

American racing driver and team owner (1940–2026)

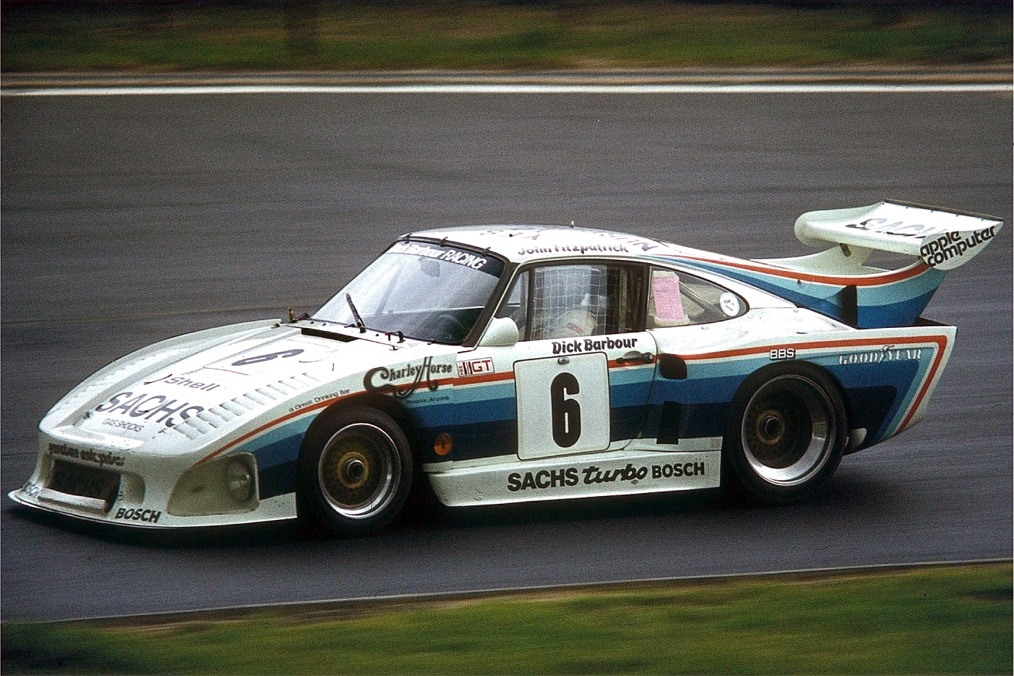
- Barbour's Porsche 935 in 1980
- Born: Richard Allan Barbour; July 3, 1940; San Diego, California, U.S.
- Died: June 10, 2026 (aged 85)
- Occupations: Racing driver Sporting executive

Richard Allan Barbour (July 3, 1940 – June 7, 2026) was an American racing driver and team owner.

== Career ==
Dick Barbour grew up in La Jolla, California, near San Diego, and developed an early interest in motorsports. He founded an auto parts store and a repair and tuning shop for Porsche vehicles, while simultaneously entering motor racing.

Barbour made his racing debut in 1968, driving a Lola T70 Mk II Spyder in several Can-Am races. He switched to a Porsche 904 and competed in non-championship races organized by the SCCA in 1969 and 1970. He entered two Can-Am races in 1971 driving a Porsche 908/02 Spyder before taking a break from racing for a few years.

Barbour returned to racing in 1977, and together with Tony Adamowicz and John Cannon, started his first endurance race at the 24 Hours of Daytona in a Ferrari 365 GTB/4 Competizione. He also competed in the GTO class of the IMSA GT Championship with a Porsche 934/5, achieving several top-ten finishes.

Barbour acquired a Porsche 935/77A for the 1978 and 1979 seasons, which he used to compete in the IMSA GT Championship, the FIA World Endurance Championship, and the World Sportscar Championship. At the 1978 24 Hours of Daytona, he finished second overall with Manfred Schurti and Johnny Rutherford. He, Brian Redman, and John Paul Sr. finished fifth overall and won the IMSA class at the 24 Hours of Le Mans.

A year later in 1979, this team repeated their success at Le Mans, finishing second overall and winning the IMSA class.

Barbour achieved his greatest success as driver in 1980, winning the three endurance races at Sebring, Riverside, and Mosport in a Porsche 935 K3/80. His last race as a driver was a second place finish at the 1980 IMSA GT Championship 500-mile race at Road America.

In 2000, Barbour returned to racing with a team, Dick Barbour Racing. In the American Le Mans Series (ALMS), Dirk Müller secured the GT class victory in the driver’s, team’s, and manufacturer’s championships, with nine wins in twelve races in a Porsche 911 GT3 R (Type 996). A year later, the Reynard 01Q racing team fielded cars in the ALMS LMP 675 class, and won the team championship and, with Didier de Radiguès, the drivers' championship.

In 2004, Barbour became a partner of the Lamborghini Murciélago manufacturer team in the USA. The Lamborghini Murciélago R-GT fielded by Krohn-Barbour Racing was not successful in the ALMS, and Barbour withdrew after one season.

From 2008, Barbour was active in racing with his partner David Robertson, fielding Ford GT race cars in the ALMS. At the 2011 24 Hours of Le Mans, the Robertson Racing LLC team competed with a Ford GT-R Mk VII in the LMGTE Am class, finishing 26th overall and third in class.

Barbour died on June 7, 2026, at the age of 85.

== 24 Hours of Le Mans Results ==
Year	Team	Vehicle	Teammate	Teammate	Place	Reason for failure
1978	(United States) Dick Barbour Racing	Porsche 935/77A	(United Kingdom) Brian Redman	(United States) John Paul Sr.	5th and class victory	
1979	(United States) Dick Barbour Racing	Porsche 935/77A	(Germany) Rolf Stommelen	(United States) Paul Newman	2nd and class victory	
1980	(United States) Dick Barbour Racing	Porsche 935K3/80	(United Kingdom) Brian Redman	(United Kingdom) John Fitzpatrick	5th and class victory	

== 12 Hours of Sebring Results ==
Year	Team	Vehicle	Teammate	Teammate	Place	Reason for failure
1978	(United States) Dick Barbour Racing	Porsche 935/77A	(Germany) Rolf Stommelen	(Liechtenstein) Manfred Schurti	Failure	Suspension
1979	(United States) Dick Barbour Racing	Porsche 935/77A	(Germany) Rolf Stommelen	(United States) Rick Mears	4th	
1980	(United States) Dick Barbour Racing	Porsche 935 K3/80	(United Kingdom) John Fitzpatrick		1st overall	

== 1000 km of Nürburgring Results ==
Year	Team	Vehicle	Teammate	Teammate	Place	Reason for failure
1979	(United States) Dick Barbour Racing	Ford Escort RS Cosworth	(United States) Bob Akin	(Germany) Helmut Gall	Failure	
1980	(United States) Sachs Sporting-Dick Barbour Team	Porsche 935K3/80	(United Kingdom) John Fitzpatrick	(Germany) Axel Plankenhorn	2nd and class victory	

== World Sportscar Championship Results ==
Season	Team	Race Car	1	2	3	4	5	6	7	8	9	10	11	12	13	14	15	16	17
1977	Ramsey Ferrari Barbour Performance	Ferrari 365 GTB/4 Porsche 934	United States	Italy	France	Italy	United Kingdom	Germany	Italy	Italy	United States	Portugal	France	Canada	Italy	Austria	United Kingdom	Germany	Italy
1977	Ramsey Ferrari Barbour Performance	Ferrari 365 GTB/4 Porsche 934	30								4								
1978	Barbour Racing	Porsche 935 AMC Pacer	United States	United States	Italy	United States	France	United Kingdom	Germany	France	Italy	United States	United States	Italy	United States				
1978	Barbour Racing	Porsche 935 AMC Pacer	2	DNF		3				5		5	2		10				
1979	Barbour Racing Amos Johnson	Porsche 935 AMC Spirit Ford Escort	United States	United States	Italy	United States	France	United States	United Kingdom	Germany	France	Italy	United States	United States	Belgium	United Kingdom	United States	Italy	El Salvador
1979	Barbour Racing Amos Johnson	Porsche 935 AMC Spirit Ford Escort	26	4		15		6		DNF	2		6	2			DNF		
1980	Barbour Racing Downing Maffucci	Porsche 935 Mazda RX-3	United States	United Kingdom	United States	Italy	Italy	United States	United Kingdom	Germany	France	United States	United States	Belgium	Canada	United States	Italy	France	
1980	Barbour Racing Downing Maffucci	Porsche 935 Mazda RX-3	29		1			1		2	5	7				2			
