= 1979 IMSA GT Championship =

9th season of the racing series organized by IMSA

Seasons
- ← 1978 1980 →

The 1979 Winston GT season was the 9th season of the IMSA GT Championship auto racing series. It was a series for GTX class Group 5 cars and GTO and GTU class Grand tourer cars. It began February 3, 1979, and ended November 25, 1979, after fifteen rounds.

== Schedule ==
Not all classes participated in shorter events. Races marked with All had all classes on track at the same time.

Rnd	Race	Length	Class	Circuit	Date
1	24 Hour Pepsi Challenge	24 Hours	All	Daytona International Speedway	February 3 February 4
2	Coca-Cola 12 Hours of Sebring	12 Hours	All	Sebring International Raceway	March 17
3	Road Atlanta Grand Prix	75 Miles	GTU	Road Atlanta	April 8
3	Road Atlanta Grand Prix	100 Miles	GTX/GTO	Road Atlanta	April 8
4	Los Angeles Times Grand Prix	6 Hours	All	Riverside International Raceway	April 22
5	Datsun Monterey Triple Crown	45 Minutes	GTU	Laguna Seca Raceway	April 29
5	Datsun Monterey Triple Crown	100 Miles	GTX/GTO	Laguna Seca Raceway	April 29
6	Mother's Day Grand Prix	1 Hour	GTU	Hallett Motor Racing Circuit	May 13
6	Mother's Day Grand Prix	100 Miles	GTX/GTO	Hallett Motor Racing Circuit	May 13
7	Coca-Cola 350	45 Minutes	GTU	Lime Rock Park	May 28
7	Coca-Cola 350	100 Miles	GTX/GTO	Lime Rock Park	May 28
8	Pepsi Grand Prix	100 Miles	All	Brainerd International Raceway	June 17
9	Paul Revere 250	250 Miles	All	Daytona International Speedway	July 4
10	Mid-Ohio GT 250	250 Miles	All	Mid-Ohio Sports Car Course	July 15
11	Sprite Grand Prix	75 Miles	GTU	Sears Point International Raceway	July 29
11	Sprite Grand Prix	100 Miles	GTX/GTO	Sears Point International Raceway	July 29
12	G.I. Joe's Grand Prix	100 Miles	GTX/GTO	Portland International Raceway	August 5
12	G.I. Joe's Grand Prix	45 Minutes	GTU	Portland International Raceway	August 5
13	Pabst 500	500 Miles	All	Road America	September 2
14	Grand Prix of Road Atlanta	100 Miles	GTX/GTO	Road Atlanta	September 23
14	Grand Prix of Road Atlanta	75 Miles	GTU	Road Atlanta	September 23
15	Winston GT 250	250 Miles	All	Daytona International Speedway	November 25

== Season results ==
Rnd	Circuit	GTX Winning Team	GTO Winning Team	GTU Winning Team	Results
Rnd	Circuit	GTX Winning Drivers	GTO Winning Drivers	GTU Winning Drivers	Results
1	Daytona	(United States) #0 Interscope Racing	(United States) #65 Modena Sports Cars	(Japan) #7 Mazda Technical Center	Results
1	Daytona	(United States) Ted Field (United States) Danny Ongais (United States) Hurley Haywood	(United States) John Morton (United States) Tony Adamowicz	(Japan) Yoshimi Katayama (Japan) Takashi Yorino (Japan) Yojiro Terada	Results
2	Sebring	(United States) #9 Dick Barbour Racing	(Puerto Rico) #38 Boricua Racing	(United States) #60 E. J. Pruitt & Sons	Results
2	Sebring	(United States) Bob Akin (United States) Rob McFarlin (United States) Roy Woods	(Puerto Rico) Bonky Fernandez (Puerto Rico) Tato Ferrer (Puerto Rico) Chiqui Soldevilla	(United States) Rusty Bond (United States) Ren Tilton	Results
3	Road Atlanta	(United States) #59 Brumos Porsche	(United States) #55 Johnson Racing	(United States) #83 Electramotive	Results
3	Road Atlanta	(United States) Peter Gregg	(United States) Howard Meister	(United States) Don Devendorf	Results
4	Riverside	(United States) #94 Whittington Bros. Racing	(United States) #07 Morrison's	(United States) #83 Electramotive	Results
4	Riverside	(United States) Don Whittington (United States) Bill Whittington	(United States) Dave Cowart (United States) Kenper Miller	(United States) Don Devendorf (United States) Tony Adamowicz	Results
5	Laguna Seca	(United States) #59 Brumos Porsche	(United States) #55 Johnson Racing	(United States) #83 Electramotive	Results
5	Laguna Seca	(United States) Peter Gregg	(United States) Howard Meister	(United States) Don Devendorf	Results
6	Hallett	(United States) #2 McLaren North America	(United States) #55 Johnson Racing	(United States) #64 Dennis Aase	Results
6	Hallett	(United Kingdom) David Hobbs	(United States) Howard Meister	(United States) Dennis Aase	Results
7	Lime Rock	(United States) #59 Brumos Porsche	(United States) #55 Johnson Racing	(United States) #38 Sam Posey	Results
7	Lime Rock	(United States) Peter Gregg	(United States) Howard Meister	(United States) Sam Posey	Results
8	Brainerd	(United States) #59 Brumos Porsche	(United States) #55 Johnson Racing	(United States) #7 Walt Bohren Racing	Results
8	Brainerd	(United States) Peter Gregg	(United States) Howard Meister	(United States) Walt Bohren	Results
9	Daytona	(United States) #5 Busch Beer Racing	(United States) #99 Phil Curran	(United States) #83 Electramotive	Results
9	Daytona	(United States) Charles Mendez (United States) Hurley Haywood	(United States) Phil Curran	(United States) Don Devendorf	Results
10	Mid-Ohio	(United States) #59 Brumos Porsche	(United States) #55 Johnson Racing	(United States) #83 Electramotive	Results
10	Mid-Ohio	(United States) Peter Gregg (United States) Hurley Haywood	(United States) Howard Meister (United States) Alan Johnson	(United States) Don Devendorf	Results
11	Sears Point	(United States) #59 Brumos Porsche	(United States) #55 Johnson Racing	(United States) #83 Electramotive	Results
11	Sears Point	(United States) Peter Gregg	(United States) Howard Meister	(United States) Don Devendorf	Results
12	Portland	(United States) #59 Brumos Porsche	(United States) #21 Neil Shelton	(United States) #83 Electramotive	Results
12	Portland	(United States) Peter Gregg	(United States) Neil Shelton	(United States) Don Devendorf	Results
13	Road America	(United States) #2 McLaren North America	(United States) #44 Group 44	(United States) #79 Sports Ltd. Racing	Results
13	Road America	(United Kingdom) David Hobbs (United Kingdom) Derek Bell	(United States) Bob Tullius (United States) Brian Fuerstenau	(United States) Bob Bergstrom (United States) Rick Knoop	Results
14	Road Atlanta	(United States) #59 Brumos Porsche	(United States) #25 Deren Automobile	(United States) #83 Electramotive	Results
14	Road Atlanta	(United States) Peter Gregg	(United States) Kenper Miller	(United States) Don Devendorf	Results
15	Daytona	(United States) #94 Whittington Bros. Racing	(Colombia) #46 DeNavarez Racing	(United States) #83 Electramotive	Results
15	Daytona	(United States) Bill Whittington	(Colombia) Mauricio de Narváez	(United States) Don Devendorf	Results
