= 1979 12 Hours of Sebring =

Sports car endurance race

The Coca-Cola Twelve Hours of Sebring International Grand Prix of Endurance, was the second round of the 1979 IMSA GT Championship. The race was held at the Sebring International Raceway, on March 17, 1979. Victory overall went to the No. 9 Dick Barbour Racing Porsche 935 driven by Bob Akin, Rob McFarlin, and Roy Woods.

== Race results ==
Class winners in bold.

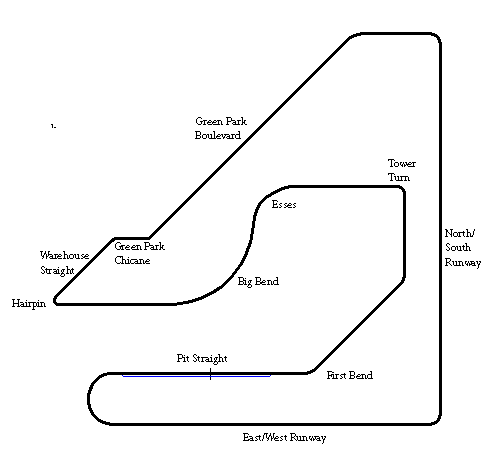
Sebring International Raceway in 1979

Pos	Class	No	Team	Drivers	Car	Laps
1	**GTX**	**9**	**(United States) Dick Barbour Racing**	**(United States) Bob Akin (United States) Rob McFarlin (United States) Roy Woods**	**Porsche 935**	**239**
2	GTX	5	(United States) Busch Beer Racing	(United States) Charles Mendez (United Kingdom) Brian Redman (United States) Paul Miller	Porsche 935	238
3	GTX	3	(United States) Dick Barbour Racing	(United States) Bob Garretson (United States) Gary Belcher (United States) Bob Bondurant	Porsche 935	235
4	GTX	6	(United States) Dick Barbour Racing	(Germany) Rolf Stommelen (United States) Dick Barbour (United States) Rick Mears	Porsche 935	234
5	**GTO**	**38**	**(Puerto Rico) Boricua Racing**	**(Puerto Rico) Bonky Fernandez (Puerto Rico) Tato Ferrer (Puerto Rico) Chiqui Soldevilla**	**Porsche 911 Carrera RSR**	**233**
6	GTX	13	(United States) Hal Shaw Racing	(United States) Hal Shaw Jr. (Canada) Norm Ridgley	Porsche 935	231
7	GTO	69	(Canada) Bytzek Automotive	(Canada) Horst Kroll (Canada) Rudy Bartling	Porsche 911 Carrera RSR	230
8	GTO	54	(United States) Montura Ranch Estates	(United States) Tony Garcia (Cuba) Juan Montalvo (United States) Alberto Vadia	Porsche 911 Carrera RSR	229
9	GTO	98	(United States) Van Every Racing	(United States) Lance Van Every (United States) Ash Tisdelle	Porsche 911 Carrera RSR	226
10	GTO	37	(Colombia) Botero Racing Team	(Colombia) Honorato Espinosa (Colombia) Francisco Lopez (Colombia) Jorge Cortes	Porsche 911 Carrera RSR	219
11	**GTU**	**60**	**(United States) E. J. Pruitt & Sons**	**(United States) Rusty Bond (United States) Ren Tilton**	**Porsche 911S**	**219**
12	GTU	39	(United States) Barrick Motor Racing	(United States) Jim Trueman (United States) John Higgins (United States) Chip Mead	Porsche 911	215
13	GTX	77	(United States) Roger T. Mandeville	(United States) Roger Mandeville (United States) Amos Johnson (United States) Jim Downing	Mazda RX-7	213
14	GTO	07	(United States) Morrison's	(United States) Dave Cowart (United States) Kenper Miller (United States) David McClain	Porsche 911 Carrera RSR	205
15	GTO	89	(Venezuela) Hector Huerta	(Venezuela) Francisco Romero (Venezuela) Ernesto Soto	Porsche 911 Carrera RSR	201
16	GTU	33	(United States) Peter Welter	(United States) Peter Welter (United States) Richard Aten (United States) Jack Refenning	Porsche 911	198
17	GTO	2	(United States) Thunderbird Swap-Shop	(United States) Bonnie Henn (United States) Lyn St. James (United States) Janet Guthrie	Ferrari 365 GTB/4	194
18	GTX	70	(United States) Walt Bohren Racing	(United States) Walt Bohren (United States) James Besmer	Mazda RX-7	193
19	GTO	91	(United States) Framm Productions	(United States) Roger Schramm (United States) Werner Frank	Porsche 911 Carrera RSR	192
20	GTU	51	(United States) Personalized Porsche	(United States) Robert Kirby (United States) Wayne Baker (United States) Tom Winters	Porsche 914	188
21	GTU	08	(United States) Moran Construction	(United States) Terry Wolters (United States) Bob Buchler (United States) Nort Northam	Porsche 911	182
22	GTU	62	(United States) Koll Motor Sports	(United States) Bill Koll (United States) Jim Cook (United States) Dennis Aase	Porsche 914	182
23	GTU	93	(Canada) M. Rochas Porsche	(Canada) David Deacon (Canada) Reagan Riley (Canada) Hank Franczak	Porsche 914	179
24 DNF	GTX	18	(United States) JLP Racing	(United States) John Paul (United States) Al Holbert	Porsche 935	176
25	GTO	52	(United States) Ours & Hours Racing	(United States) Jack Swanson (United States) Dick Gauthier	Chevrolet Camaro	158
26 DNF	GTX	09	(United States) Thunderbird Swap-Shop	(United States) Hurley Haywood (United States) Preston Henn (United States) Peter Gregg	Porsche 935	157
27 DNF	GTO	66	(United States) Sunset Racing	(United States) Jeff Loving (United States) Richard Small (United States) Ralph Noseda	Chevrolet Camaro	148
28 DNF	GTO	46	(Colombia) Mauricio de Narváez	(Colombia) Mauricio de Narváez (United States) Albert Naon	Porsche 911 Carrera RSR	147
29	GTU	01	(United States) Roehrig Racing	(United States) Dave White (United States) Robert Overby	Porsche 911	147
30 DNF	GTO	12	(United States) Ford Smith Racing	(United States) Ford Smith (United States) Jimmy Tumbleston (United States) Neil Potter	Chevrolet Camaro	139
31 DNF	GTU	71	(United States) Bruce Jennings	(United States) Bruce Jennings (United States) Bob Beasley	Porsche 911	136
32	GTU	44	(United States) SUD Porsche Racing	(United States) George Van Arsdale (United States) Kent Murry	Porsche 911	131
33	GTU	02	(United States) Roehrig Racing	(United States) J. Dana Roehrig (United States) J. Kurt Roehrig	Porsche 911	128
34	GTX	53	(United States) Guy F. Thomas	(United States) Guy Thomas (United States) Milton Moise (United States) Tom Nehl	Chevrolet Camaro	122
35 DNF	GTX	00	(United States) Interscope Racing	(United States) Ted Field (United States) Danny Ongais	Porsche 935	120
36	GTX	43	(United States) Meldeau Tire Stores	(United States) Bill McDill (United States) Tom Frank	Chevrolet Camaro	118
37 DNF	GTO	81	(United States) Jones Ind. Racing	(United States) Steve Faul (United States) Herb Jones Jr. (United States) Fred Lang	Chevrolet Corvette	116
38 DNF	GTO	29	(United States) Stratagraph	(United States) Billy Hagan (United States) Hoyt Overbagh (United States) Ron Reed	Chevrolet Monza	115
39 DNF	GTU	50	(Canada) R & H Racing	(Canada) Rainer Brezinka (Canada) Gary Hirsch (Canada) Fritz Hochreuter	Porsche 911S	109
40 DNF	GTU	75	(Puerto Rico) Mike Ramirez	(Puerto Rico) Mike Ramirez (Puerto Rico) Manuel Villa (Puerto Rico) Luis Gordillo	Porsche 911	108
41 DNF	GTU	36	(United States) Case Racing	(United States) Ron Case (United States) Dave Panaccione	Porsche 911	106
42 DNF	GTX	94	(United States) Whittington Bros. Racing	(United States) Bill Whittington (United States) Don Whittington	Porsche 935	104
43 DNF	GTU	72	(United States) Bill Scott Racing-Z&W	(United States) Bill Scott (United States) Pierre Honegger	Porsche 911	99
44 DNF	GTO	92	(United States) Whittington Bros. Racing	(United States) Dale Whittington (United States) R. D. Whittington (United States) Milt Minter	Porsche 934	94
45 DNF	GTU	88	(United States) Day Enterprise Racing	(United States) Dave Yerger (United States) Dario Orlando (United States) Del Russo Taylor	Alfa Romeo Alfetta GTV	90
46 DNF	GTU	85	(United States) John E. Hulen	(United States) John Hulen (United States) Ron Coupland (United States) Bob Speakman	Porsche 914	82
47 DNF	GTO	56	(Canada) Peerless Racing	(United States) Craig Carter (Canada) Murray Edwards (United States) Richard Valentine	Chevrolet Camaro	81
48 DNF	GTX	23	(United States) Kemp Motoracing	(United States) Charlie Kemp (Canada) Kees Nierop (United States) Carson Baird	Ford Mustang II	80
49 DNF	GTU	27	(United States) Miami Auto Racing	(United States) Ray Mummery (United States) Tom Sheehy (United States) Luis Sereix	Porsche 911S	80
50 DNF	GTX	97	(Colombia) Ricardo Londoño	(Colombia) Ricardo Londoño (United States) George Garces (United States) John Gunn	Porsche 935	77
51 DNF	GTU	8	(United States) Automobiles International	(United States) Anatoly Arutunoff (United States) Jose Marina (United States) Danny Sullivan	Lancia Stratos HF	75
52 DNF	GTU	34	(United States) Drolsom Racing	(United States) George Drolsom (United States) Mark Greb (United States) John Maffucci	Porsche 911	75
53 DNF	GTO	03	(United States) Motorcito Racing	(United States) Tico Almeida (United States) Rene Rodriguez (United States) Pepe Romero	Chevrolet Corvette	73
54 DNF	GTU	31	(United States) Hiram Cruz	(United States) Hiram Cruz (United States) Juan Lopez (Puerto Rico) Mandy Gonzalez	Porsche 911	66
55 DNF	GTO	58	(Puerto Rico) Diego Febles Racing	(Puerto Rico) Diego Febles (United States) Phil Currin	Porsche 911 Carrera RSR	65
56 DNF	GTU	79	(United States) Sports Ltd. Racing	(United States) Bob Bergstrom (United States) Brad Frisselle	Mazda RX-7	64
57 DNF	GTO	04	(United States) Rick Thompkins	(United States) Rick Thompkins (United States) Dave Heinz	Chevrolet Corvette	61
58 DNF	GTO	95	(United States) Ozone Industries	(United States) Stephen Bond (United States) Philip Dann	Chevrolet Monza	49
59 DNF	GTO	22	(United States) Oftedahl Racing	(United States) Peter Kirill (United States) Gerry Wellik (United States) Carl Shafer	Chevrolet Camaro	37
60 DNF	GTU	25	(United States) Metal Craft Racing	(United States) Bob Zulkowski (United States) Gerard Raney	Porsche 914	34
61 DNF	GTX	17	(United States) Kenneth D. LaGrow	(United States) Kenneth LaGrow (United States) William Boyer	Chevrolet Camaro	29
62 DNF	GTU	16	(United States) Overstreet Racing Ent.	(United States) Darrel Overstreet (United States) Dwight Mitchell	Porsche 914	25
63 DNF	GTX	28	(United States) Desperado Racing	(United States) Clif Kearns (Italy) Giampiero Moretti	Porsche 935	23
64 DNF	GTU	61	(United States) Bill Bean	(United States) Bill Bean (United States) Al Cosentino (United States) Tom Ashby	Mazda RX-3	19
65 DNF	GTX	7	(Canada) Heimrath Racing	(Canada) Ludwig Heimrath Sr. (El Salvador) "Jamsal" (El Salvador) Carlos Moran	Porsche 935	17
66 DNF	GTU	57	(United States) J. F. Tremblay	(United States) John Tremblay (United States) Bob Lapp	Datsun 240Z	12
67 DNF	GTU	40	(United States) Performance Specialists	(United States) Steve Southard (United States) Earl Roe	Porsche 914	11
68 DNF	GTU	67	(United States) Quintana Racing	(United States) Manuel Quintana (Dominican Republic) Joaquin Balaguer (United States) Jorge DeCardenas (United States) Pedro Vazquez	Porsche 911	9
69 DNF	GTU	48	(United States) Fillingham Racing	(United States) Sam Fillingham (United States) Courtney Canfield (United States) Tim Chitwood	Chevrolet Corvette	8
70 DNF	GTO	21	(United States) Oftedahl/Shafer Farms	(United States) Carl Shafer (United States) John Wood	Chevrolet Camaro	8
71 DNF	GTO	15	(Germany) Bavarian Motors	(United States) Alf Gebhardt (Germany) Bruno Beilcke	BMW 3.5 CSL	4
72 DNF	GTO	4	(United States) B. R. Racing Team	(United States) Mark Leuzinger (United States) Mike Van der Werff	De Tomaso Pantera	0

=== Class Winners ===
Class	Winners	
GTX	Akin / McFarland / Woods	Porsche 935
GTO	Fernandez / Ferrer / Soldevilla	Porsche 911 Carrera RSR
GTU	Bond / Tilton	Porsche 911S
