= 1980 12 Hours of Sebring =

Sports car endurance race

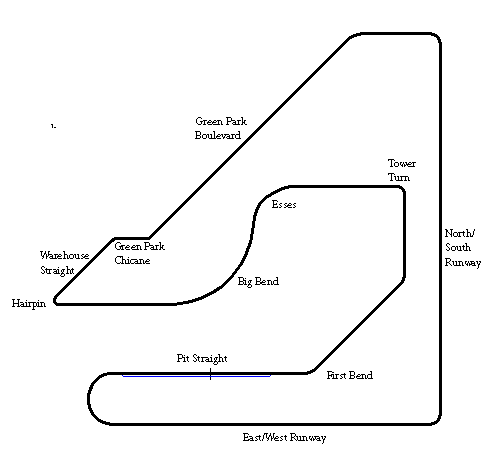
Sebring International Raceway in 1980

The Coca-Cola Twelve Hours of Sebring International Grand Prix of Endurance, was the second round of the 1980 IMSA GT Championship and was held at the Sebring International Raceway, on 22 March 1980. Victory overall went to the No. 6 Dick Barbour Racing Porsche 935 driven by John Fitzpatrick and Dick Barbour.

== Race results ==
Class winners in bold.

Pos	Class	No	Team	Drivers	Car	Laps
1	**GTX**	**6**	**(United States) Dick Barbour Racing**	**(United Kingdom) John Fitzpatrick (United States) Dick Barbour**	**Porsche 935**	**253**
2	GTX	0	(United States) Interscope Racing	(United States) Ted Field (United States) Danny Ongais	Porsche 935	250
3	GTX	93	(United States) Whittington Bros.	(United States) Don Whittington (United States) Bill Whittington (United States) Dale Whittington	Porsche 935	247
4	GTX	09	(United States) Thunderbird Swap Shop	(United States) John Paul (United States) Preston Henn (United States) Al Holbert	Porsche 935	239
5	GTX	05	(United States) Mendez/Woods/Akin	(United States) Bob Akin (United States) Roy Woods (United States) Skeeter McKitterick	Porsche 935	232
6	**GTO**	**44**	**(United States) Group 44**	**(United States) Bob Tullius (Canada) Bill Adam**	**Triumph TR8**	**230**
7	GTX	9	(United States) Dick Barbour Racing	(United States) Bob Garretson (United States) Bobby Rahal (Canada) Kees Nierop	Porsche 935	227
8	GTX	07	(Canada) Ludwig Heimrath	(Canada) Ludwig Heimrath (United States) Johnny Rutherford (Spain) Carlos Moran	Porsche 935	224
9	**GTU**	**77**	**(United States) Mandeville Racing**	**(United States) Roger Mandeville (United States) Jim Downing (United States) Brad Frisselle**	**Mazda RX-7**	**222**
10	GTX	86	(United States) Bayside Disposal Racing	(United States) Peter Gregg (United States) Hurley Haywood (United States) Bruce Leven	Porsche 935	220
11 DNF	GTO	68	(Dominican Republic) Porsche Montecarlo	(Dominican Republic) Luis Mendez (Dominican Republic) Jaime Rodriguez (Venezuela) Ernesto Soto	Porsche 911 Carrera RSR	216
12	GTO	03	(United States) Toyota Village	(United States) Werner Frank (United States) James Brolin	Porsche 934	213
13	GTO	92	(United States) Framm Promotions	(United States) Roger Schramm (Canada) Rudy Bartling	Porsche 911 Carrera RSR	213
14	GTU	95	(Puerto Rico) Mike Ramirez	(Puerto Rico) Mike Ramirez (Puerto Rico) Manuel Villa (Puerto Rico) Luis Gordillo	Porsche 911	212
15	GTU	96	(United States) NTS Racing	(United States) Sam Posey (United States) George Alderman (United States) Fred Stiff	Datsun 240Z	211
16	GTO	37	(Colombia) Botero Racing	(Colombia) Honorato Espinosa (Colombia) Jorge Cortes	Porsche 911 Carrera RSR	211
17	GTU	81	(United States) Trinity Racing	(United States) Mark Welch (United States) Tom Winters (United States) Jim Cook	Mazda RX-7	210
18	GTU	34	(United States) Drolsom Racing	(United States) George Drolsom (United States) Bill Johnson (United States) Rob Hoskins	Porsche 911	206
19	GTO	56	(United States) Rick Borlase	(United States) Rick Borlase (United States) Don Kravig (United States) Michael Hammond	Porsche 911	205
20	GTU	22	(Canada) R&H Racing	(Canada) Gary Hirsch (Canada) Rainer Brezinka (Canada) Peter Aschenbrenner	Porsche 914	205
21	GTO	98	(United States) Van Every Racing	(United States) Lance van Every (United States) Ash Tisdelle	Porsche 911 Carrera RSR	194
22	GTO	90	(United States) Bob's Speed Products	(United States) Bob Lee (United States) Rick Kump (United States) Jim Leo	AMC AMX	191
23 DNF	GTO	54	(United States) Montura Racing	(United States) Tony Garcia (United States) Albert Naon (United States) Terry Herman	Porsche 911 Carrera RSR	187
24	GTU	87	(United States) Der Klaus Haus	(United States) Klaus Bitterauf (United States) James Moxley (United States) Vicki Smith	Porsche 911	185
25	GTU	31	(Dominican Republic) Lopez Bros.	(Dominican Republic) Juan Lopez (Dominican Republic) Jose Arzeno	Porsche 911	179
26 DNF	GTO	46	(Colombia) de Narvaez Enterprises	(Colombia) Mauricio de Narváez (Colombia) Ricardo Londoño	Porsche 911 Carrera RSR	177
27 DNF	GTX	30	(Italy) Electrodyne	(Italy) Giampiero Moretti (Italy) Giorgio Pianta (Italy) Renzo Zorzi	Porsche 935	176
28 DNF	GTU	24	(United States) DiLella Racing	(United States) Vince DiLella (United States) Manuel Cueto	Porsche 914-6 GT	172
29	GTO	60	(United States) Bill Ferran	(United States) Bill Ferran (United States) Rusty Bond (United States) Jack Refenning	Porsche 911 Carrera RSR	172
30	GTX	25	(United States) Red Lobster Racing	(United States) Dave Cowart (United States) Kenper Miller (United Kingdom) Derek Bell	BMW M1	172
31 DNF	GTX	80	(Canada) All Canadian/Peerless	(Canada) Maurice Carter (United States) Craig Carter (Canada) Murray Edwards	Chevrolet Camaro	167
32	GTO	49	(United States) Tortilla Flats Racing	(Australia) Warwick Henderson (United States) Bob Copeman (United States) John Humphreys	Porsche 911 Carrera RSR	166
33	GTU	57	(United States) Personalized Porsche	(United States) Wayne Baker (United States) Jeff Scott (United States) Dan Gilliland	Porsche 914	163
34	GTU	78	(United States) Revolution Wheels	(United States) Bruce Nesbitt (United States) Alan Johnson	Mazda RX-2	162
35 DNF	GTU	08	(United States) Moran Construction	(United States) Ray Ratcliff (United States) M. L. Speer (United States) Terry Wolters	Porsche 911 SC	161
36	GTO	99	(United States) National Jets	(United States) Russ Boy (United States) Tom Hunt	Chevrolet Corvette	160
37 DNF	GTO	51	(United States) Kirby-Hitchcock Racing	(United States) Robert Kirby (United States) Freddy Baker (United States) Michael Sherwin	Porsche 911 Carrera RSR	153
38	GTU	79	(United States) Sports Ltd. Racing	(United States) Bob Bergstrom (United States) Patrick Bedard	Mazda RX-7	148
39 DNF	GTO	88	(United States) Herb Adams V.S.E.	(United States) Herb Adams (United States) Jerry Thompson	Pontiac Firebird Trans Am	146
40	GTO	84	(United States) Bard Boand Racing	(United States) Bard Boand (United States) Robert Kivela (United States) Ray Irwin	Chevrolet Corvette C2 Sting Ray	140
41	GTX	27	(United States) Holley & LaGrow	(United States) Kenneth LaGrow (United States) William Boyer (United States) Jack Turner	Chevrolet Camaro	138
42	GTO	58	(Puerto Rico) Coco Lopez/Piña Colada	(Puerto Rico) Mandy Gonzalez (Puerto Rico) Diego Febles (Puerto Rico) Chiqui Soldevilla	Porsche 934	135
43 DNF	GTU	82	(United States) Trinity Racing	(United States) John Casey (United States) Steve Dietrich (United States) Lee Mueller	Mazda RX-7	123
44 DNF	GTU	73	(United States) Z&W Enterprises	(United States) Pierre Honegger (United States) Mark Hutchins (United States) Walt Bohren	Mazda RX-7	118
45 DNF	GTO	06	(United States) Fassler-Mullen Racing	(United States) Jim Mullen (United States) Paul Fassler (United States) Craig Siebert	Porsche 911 Carrera RSR	108
46	GTO	40	(United States) Joe Cotrone	(United States) Joe Cotrone (United States) Emory Donaldson (United States) Phil Currin	Chevrolet Corvette	106
47 DNF	GTO	12	(United States) Oftedahl Tracking	(United States) Bob Young (United States) Bob Lazier	Chevrolet Camaro	101
48 DNF	GTX	3	(United States) Jim Busby Industries	(United States) Jim Busby (United States) Bruce Jenner (United States) Rick Knoop	BMW M1	100
49 DNF	GTX	55	(United States) Condor Racing	(United States) Ralph Kent-Cooke (United States) Lyn St. James	Porsche 935	87
50 DNF	GTU	70	(United States) Chris Doyle	(United States) Chris Doyle (United States) Charles Guest (United States) Mike Meyer	Mazda RX-7	87
51 DNF	GTX	7	(United States) Caribbean AMC/Jeep	(United States) Lou Statzer (United States) Amos Johnson (United States) Dennis Shaw	AMC Spirit AMX	84
52 DNF	GTO	32	(El Salvador) Scorpio Racing	(El Salvador) "Jamsal" (El Salvador) Carlos Pineda (El Salvador) Eduardo Barrientos	Porsche 911 Carrera RSR	80
53 DNF	GTO	10	(United States) Oftedahl Trucking	(United States) Dave Heinz (United States) Bob Nagel	Chevrolet Camaro	74
54 DNF	GTO	38	(Puerto Rico) Boricua Racing	(Puerto Rico) Bonky Fernandez (Puerto Rico) Tato Ferrer (Germany) Ulrich Lange	Porsche 911 Carrera RSR	73
55 DNF	GTU	23	(United States) Metalcraft Racing	(United States) Bob Zulkowski (United States) Dennis Brisken (United States) Gary Nylander	Porsche 914	73
56 DNF	GTU	71	(United States) Bruce Jennings	(United States) Bruce Jennings (United States) Bill Bean (United States) Tom Ashby	Porsche 911	69
57 DNF	GTO	83	(Canada) David Deacon	(Canada) David Deacon (Canada) Peter Moennick	Porsche 911 Carrera RSR	63
58 DNF	GTO	15	(Germany) Bavarian Motors International	(United States) Alf Gebhardt (Germany) Bruno Beilicke	BMW 3.5 CSL	63
59 DNF	GTO	14	(United States) George Garcia	(United States) George Garcia (United States) Vic Shinn (United States) Daniel Vilarchao	Chevrolet Corvette	63
60 DNF	GTX	4	(United States) Dick Barbour Racing	(United States) Buzz Marcus (United States) Bob Harmon (United States) Marty Hinze	Porsche 935	52
61 DNF	GTX	13	(United States) Andial Racing	(United States) Randolph Townsend (United States) John Morton (United States) Howard Meister	Porsche 935 K3	52
62 DNF	GTU	35	(United States) Janis Taylor	(United States) Del Russo Taylor (United States) Janis Taylor (United States) Dave Cavenaugh	Alfa Romeo Alfetta	51
63 DNF	GTX	50	(United States) Shulnburg Scrap Metal	(United States) R. V. Shulnburg (United States) Michael Keyser (United States) Tim Morgan	Chevrolet Corvette	49
64 DNF	GTX	5	(United States) Mendez/Woods/Akin	(United States) Charles Mendez (United Kingdom) Brian Redman (United States) Paul Miller	Porsche 935 K3	49
65 DNF	GTO	41	(United States) Jones Industries Racing	(United States) Herb Jones Jr. (United States) Steve Faul (United States) Kent Combs	Buick Skylark	43
66 DNF	GTU	66	(United States) George R. Shafer	(United States) George Shafer (United States) Craig Shafer (United States) Al Crookston	Datsun 240Z	37
67 DNF	GTO	89	(Venezuela) Hector Huerta Racing	(Venezuela) Ernesto Soto (Venezuela) Luis Rodriguez	Porsche 911 Carrera RSR	35
68 DNF	GTX	02	(United States) T&R Racing	(United States) Tico Almeida (United States) Rene Rodriguez (United States) Gabriel Riano	Chevrolet Corvette C3	33
69 DNF	GTO	65	(United States) Jeffrey Loving	(United States) Ralph Noseda (United States) Jeff Loving (United States) Richard Small	Chevrolet Camaro	28
70 DNF	GTO	48	(United States) Dynasales	(United States) John Carusso	Chevrolet Corvette	28
71 DNF	GTO	12	(United States) Performance Marine	(United States) Ford Smith (United States) Bruce Jernigan (United States) Jimmy Tumbleston	Chevrolet Camaro	28
72 DNF	GTU	8	(United States) A. I. Honda	(United States) Anatoly Arutnoff (United States) Jose Marina	Lancia Stratos	23
73 DNF	GTU	85	(United States) John E. Hulen	(United States) John Hulen (United States) Ron Coupland	Porsche 914	20
74 DNF	GTO	17	(United States) Tim Chitwood	(United States) Tim Chitwood (United States) Sam Fillingham (United States) Vince Gimondo	Chevrolet Nova	19
75 DNF	GTO	28	(United States) Hamilton House Racing	(United States) Robert Overby (United States) Joseph Hamilton (United States) Herb Forrest	Porsche 911S	12
76 DNF	GTU	74	(United States) Z&W Enterprises	(United States) Carlos Ramirez (United States) Neale Messina (United States) Chester Vincentz	Mazda RX-7	8
77 DNF	GTO	61	(United States) Tim Morgan	(United States) Vince Muzzin (United States) Marcus Opie (United States) Tim Evans	Chevrolet Corvette	5
78 DNF	GTX	62	(Japan) Tom's/Dome/Kegel Enterprises	(Japan) Nobuhide Tachi (United States) Bill Koll (United States) Tim Sharp	Dome Celica Turbo	4
79 DNF	GTU	36	(United States) Case Racing	(United States) Dave Panaccione (United States) Ron Case (United States) Jack Rynerson	Porsche 911	4
DNS	GTX	53	(United States) Bruce Leven	(United States) Bruce Leven (United States) Hurley Haywood	Porsche 935	0
DNS	GTU	01	(United States) Midwest BMW Service	(United States) H. David Redszus (United States) Leo Franchi (United States) Merv Rosen	BMW 2002	0
DNS	GTO	47	(United States) Dennis Mikell	(United States) Terry Keller (United States) Bob Gray (United States) Scott Chapman	Chevrolet Corvette	0
DNS	GTU	67	(United States) Manuel Quintana Racing	(United States) Manuel Quintana (United States) Fernando Garcia	Porsche 911	0
