= 1980 IMSA GT Championship =

10th season of the racing series organized by IMSA

Seasons
- ← 1979 1981 →

The 1980 IMSA GT Series season was the 10th season of the IMSA GT Championship auto racing series. It was a series for GTX class Group 5 cars and GTO and GTU class grand tourer cars. It began February 2, 1980, and ended November 30, 1980, after fourteen rounds.

== Schedule ==
Not all classes participated in shorter events. Races marked with All had all classes on track at the same time.

Rnd	Race	Length	Class	Circuit	Date
1	24 Hour Pepsi Challenge	24 Hours	All	Daytona International Speedway	February 2 February 3
2	Coca-Cola 12 Hours of Sebring	12 Hours	All	Sebring International Raceway	March 22
3	Road Atlanta Grand Prix	50 Miles (twice)	GTX/GTO	Road Atlanta	April 12
3	Road Atlanta Grand Prix	45 Minutes	GTU	Road Atlanta	April 12
4	Los Angeles Times/Toyota Grand Prix	5 Hours	All	Riverside International Raceway	April 27
5	Datsun Monterey Triple Crown	45 Minutes	GTU	Laguna Seca Raceway	May 4
5	Datsun Monterey Triple Crown	100 Miles	GTX/GTO	Laguna Seca Raceway	May 4
6	Coca-Cola 400	45 Minutes	GTU	Lime Rock Park	May 26
6	Coca-Cola 400	1 Hour 30 Minutes	GTX/GTO	Lime Rock Park	May 26
7	Pepsi Grand Prix	100 Miles	GTO/GTU	Brainerd International Raceway	June 15
8	Paul Revere 250	250 Miles	All	Daytona International Speedway	July 4
9	Datsun's Golden State Challenge	100 Miles	GTX/GTO	Golden State International Raceway	July 27
9	Datsun's Golden State Challenge	75 Miles	GTU	Golden State International Raceway	July 27
10	G.I. Joe's Grand Prix	100 Miles	GTX/GTO	Portland International Raceway	August 3
10	G.I. Joe's Grand Prix	45 Minutes	GTU	Portland International Raceway	August 3
11	Molson Canadian 1000	6 Hours	All	Mosport Park	August 17
12	Pabst 500	500 Miles	All	Road America	August 31
13	Grand Prix of Road Atlanta	45 Minutes	GTU	Road Atlanta	September 21
13	Grand Prix of Road Atlanta	50 Miles (twice)	GTX/GTO	Road Atlanta	September 21
14	Championship Finale Daytona GT 250	250 Miles	All	Daytona International Speedway	November 30

== Season results ==
Rnd	Circuit	GTX Winning Team	GTO Winning Team	GTU Winning Team	Results
Rnd	Circuit	GTX Winning Drivers	GTO Winning Drivers	GTU Winning Drivers	Results
1	Daytona	(Germany) #2 LM Joest Racing	(United States) #54 Montura Racing	(United States) #62 Koll Motor Sports	Results
1	Daytona	(Germany) Reinhold Joest (Germany) Rolf Stommelen (Germany) Volkert Merl	(United States) Tony Garcia (United States) Alberto Vadia (United States) Terry Herman	(United States) Bill Koll (United States) Jim Cook (United States) Greg LaCava	Results
2	Sebring	(United States) #6 Dick Barbour Racing	(United States) #44 Group 44	(United States) #77 Mandeville Racing	Results
2	Sebring	(United States) Dick Barbour (United Kingdom) John Fitzpatrick	(United States) Bob Tullius (Canada) Bill Adam	(United States) Roger Mandeville (United States) Jim Downing (United States) Brad Frisselle	Results
3	Road Atlanta	(United States) #95 Whittington Bros. Racing	(United States) #99 Full-Time Racing	(United States) #7 Racing Beat	Results
3	Road Atlanta	(United States) Bill Whittington	(United States) Phil Currin	(United States) Walt Bohren	Results
4	Riverside	(United States) #6 Dick Barbour Racing	(United States) #54 Montura Racing	(United States) #47 Brad Frisselle Racing	Results
4	Riverside	(United States) Dick Barbour (United Kingdom) John Fitzpatrick	(United States) Tony Garcia (United States) Terry Herman	(United States) Brad Frisselle (Japan) Yoshimi Katayama	Results
5	Laguna Seca	(United States) #6 Dick Barbour Racing	(United States) #54 Montura Racing	(United States) #7 Racing Beat	Results
5	Laguna Seca	(United Kingdom) John Fitzpatrick	(United States) Tony Garcia	(United States) Walt Bohren	Results
6	Lime Rock	(United States) #09 Preston Henn	(Dominican Republic) #63 Mendez Racing	(United States) #83 Electramotive	Results
6	Lime Rock	(United States) John Paul Sr. (United States) John Paul Jr.	(Dominican Republic) Luis Mendez	(United States) Don Devendorf	Results
7	Brainerd	Did not participate	(Dominican Republic) #63 Mendex Racing	(United States) #17 Racing Beat	Results
7	Brainerd		(Dominican Republic) Luis Mendez	(United States) Jeff Kline	Results
8	Daytona	(United States) #6 Dick Barbour Racing	(United States) #44 Group 44	(United States) #7 Racing Beat	Results
8	Daytona	(United Kingdom) John Fitzpatrick	(United States) Bob Tullius	(United States) Walt Bohren	Results
9	Golden State	(United States) #6 Dick Barbour Racing	(Dominican Republic) #68 Mendez Racing	(United States) #7 Racing Beat	Results
9	Golden State	(United Kingdom) John Fitzpatrick	(Dominican Republic) Luis Mendez	(United States) Walt Bohren	Results
10	Portland	(United States) #6 Dick Barbour Racing	(Dominican Republic) #68 Mendez Racing	(United States) #7 Racing Beat	Results
10	Portland	(United Kingdom) John Fitzpatrick	(Dominican Republic) Luis Mendez	(United States) Walt Bohren	Results
11	Mosport	(United States) #6 Dick Barbour Racing	(United States) #44 JRT Quaker State	(United States) #17 Racing Beat	Results
11	Mosport	(United Kingdom) John Fitzpatrick (United Kingdom) Brian Redman	(United States) Bob Tullius (Canada) Bill Adam	(United States) John Morton (United States) Jeff Kline (United States) Walt Bohren	Results
12	Road America	(United States) #18 JLP Racing	(United States) #44 Group 44	(United States) #83 Electramotive	Results
12	Road America	(United States) John Paul Sr. (United States) John Paul Jr.	(United States) Bob Tullius (Canada) Bill Adam	(United States) Don Devendorf (United States) Tony Adamowicz	Results
13	Road Atlanta	(Italy) #30 MOMO/Electrodyne	(Colombia) #46 DeNarvaez Enterprises	(United States) #7 Racing Beat	Results
13	Road Atlanta	(Italy) Gianpiero Moretti	(United States) Terry Herman	(United States) Jeff Kline	Results
14	Daytona	(Italy) #30 MOMO/Electrodyne	(United States) #4 Group 44	(United States) #32 Alderman Racing	Results
14	Daytona	(Italy) Gianpiero Moretti (Germany) Reinhold Joest	(Canada) Bill Adam	(United States) George Alderman	Results
