= 1979 World Championship for Makes =

Racing tournament

1979 World Sportscar Championship

Seasons
- ← 1978 1980 →

The 1979 World Sportscar Championship season was the 27th season of FIA World Sportscar Championship racing. It featured the 1979 World Championship for Makes which was open to Group 1 and 2 Touring Cars, Group 3 and 4 Grand Touring cars, and Group 5 Special Production Cars. The championship ran from 3 February to 16 September 1979 and consisted of nine rounds. It was contested in two engine capacity divisions, Over 2 Litres and Under 2 Litres.

The Over 2 Litres Division was won by Porsche and the Under 2 Litres Division by Lancia.

== Schedule ==
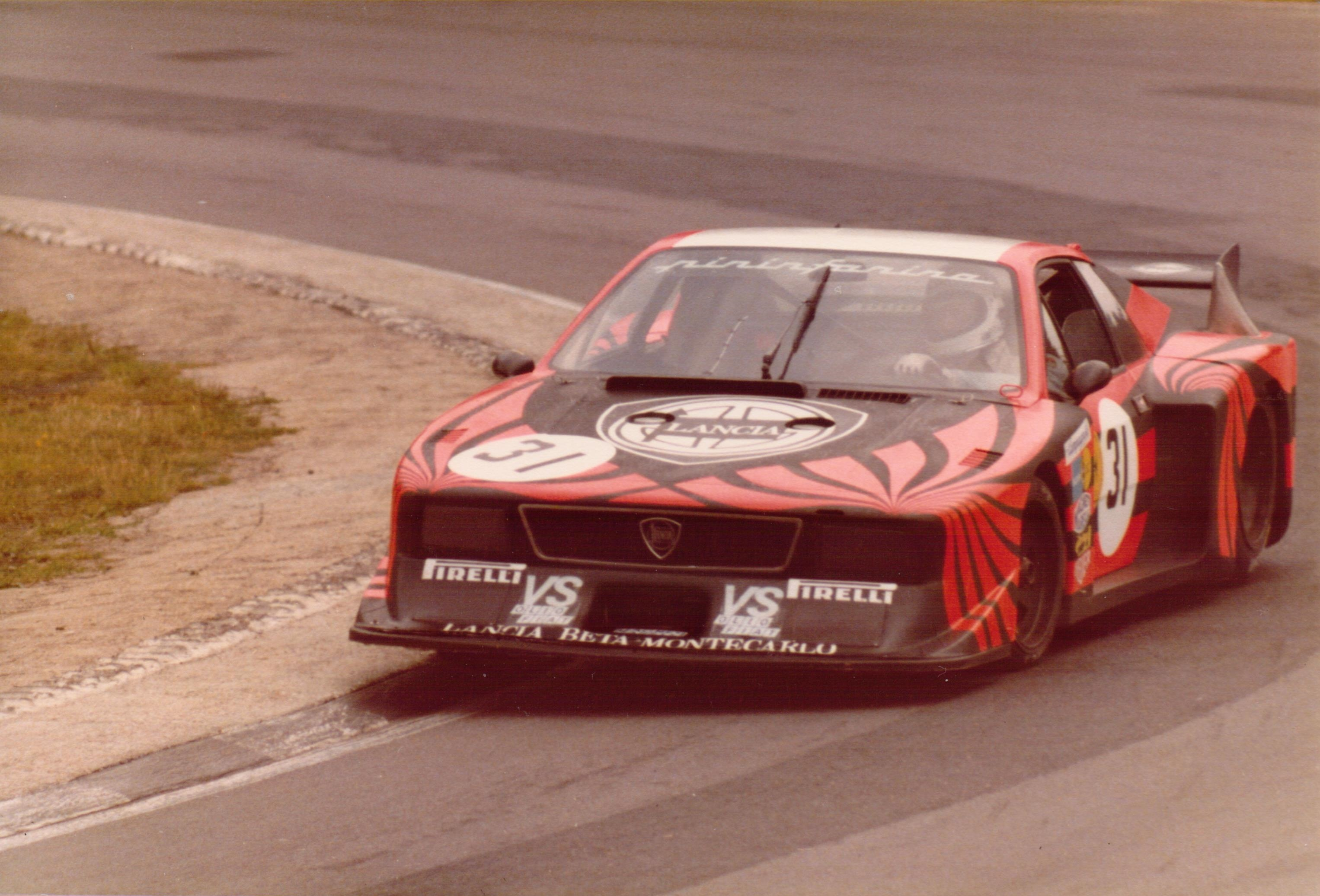
Lancia won the Under 2 Litres Division with the Beta Montecarlo.

Rnd	Race	Circuit	Date
1	(United States) 24 Hour Pepsi Challenge	Daytona International Speedway	3 February; 4 February
2	(Italy) 6 Hours of Mugello	Mugello Circuit	18 March
3	(France) Dijon 6 Hours	Dijon-Prenois	22 April
4	(United Kingdom) Rivet Supply 6 Hours	Silverstone Circuit	6 May
5	(Germany) 1000km Nürburgring	Nürburgring	3 June
6	(Italy) Coppa Florio	Autodromo di Pergusa	24 June
7	(United States) Watkins Glen 6 Hours	Watkins Glen International	8 July
8	(United Kingdom) Rivet Supply 6 Hours	Brands Hatch	5 August
9	(Italy) Trofeo Ignazio Giunti (6 Hours)	Vallelunga	16 September

== Season results ==
Rnd	Circuit	Over 2.0 Winning Team	Under 2.0 Winning Team	Results
Rnd	Circuit	Over 2.0 Winning Drivers	Under 2.0 Winning Drivers	Results
Rnd	Circuit	Over 2.0 Winning Car	Under 2.0 Winning Car	Results
1	Daytona	(United States) #0 Interscope Racing	None	Results
1	Daytona	(United States) Ted Field (United States) Danny Ongais (United States) Hurley Haywood		Results
1	Daytona	(Germany) Porsche 935/79		Results
2	Mugello	(Germany) #12 Gelo Racing Team	None	Results
2	Mugello	(France) Bob Wollek (Liechtenstein) Manfred Schurti (United Kingdom) John Fitzpatrick		Results
2	Mugello	(Germany) Porsche 935/77		Results
3	Dijon	(Germany) #31 Gelo Racing Team	None	Results
3	Dijon	(France) Bob Wollek (Liechtenstein) Manfred Schurti (Belgium) Jacky Ickx		Results
3	Dijon	(Germany) Porsche 935/77		Results
4	Silverstone	(Germany) #3 Gelo Sportswear	None	Results
4	Silverstone	(France) Bob Wollek (Germany) Hans Heyer (United Kingdom) John Fitzpatrick		Results
4	Silverstone	(Germany) Porsche 935/77		Results
5	Nürburgring	(Germany) #6 Gelo Racing Team	(Germany) #25 Jägermeister	Results
5	Nürburgring	(France) Bob Wollek (Liechtenstein) Manfred Schurti (United Kingdom) John Fitzpatrick	(Germany) Eckhard Schrimpf (Germany) Hans-Georg Bürger	Results
5	Nürburgring	(Germany) Porsche 935/77	(Germany) BMW 320i	Results
6	Pergusa	(Switzerland) #4 Lubrifilm Racing	(Italy) #11 Lancia Corse	Results
6	Pergusa	(Switzerland) Angelo Pallavicini (Switzerland) Marco Vanoli	(Italy) Riccardo Patrese (Italy) Carlo Facetti	Results
6	Pergusa	(Germany) Porsche Carrera RSR	(Italy) Lancia Beta Montecarlo	Results
7	Watkins Glen	(United States) #94 Whittington/Kremer	None	Results
7	Watkins Glen	(United States) Don Whittington (United States) Bill Whittington (Germany) Klaus Ludwig		Results
7	Watkins Glen	(Germany) Porsche 935 K3		Results
8	Brands Hatch	(Germany) #27 Porsche Kremer Racing	(Italy) #31 ASA Corse	Results
8	Brands Hatch	(Germany) Klaus Ludwig (Germany) Axel Plankenhorn	(Italy) Riccardo Patrese (Germany) Walter Röhrl	Results
8	Brands Hatch	(Germany) Porsche 935 K3	(Italy) Lancia Beta Montecarlo	Results
9	Vallelunga	(Switzerland) #54 Ecurie Biennoise	(Italy) #33 Giuseppi Piazzi	Results
9	Vallelunga	(Switzerland) Enzo Calderari (Switzerland) Willi Spavetti (Switzerland) Rolf Moritz	(Italy) Giuseppi Piazzi (Italy) Renzo Zorzi (Italy) Stanislao Sterzel	Results
9	Vallelunga	(Germany) Porsche Carrera RSR	(Italy) Fiat X1/9	Results

Note: Entries which were not eligible to score championship points are not accounted for in the above table.

== Manufacturers' championship ==
Points were awarded for placings gained by the top ten cars in each division at each round in the order of 20-15-12-10-8-6-4-3-2-1. However, points were only awarded for the highest placed car from each make in each division and any other cars from that make were merely skipped in the points allocation.

Only the best seven round results for each make in each division counted towards the championship with any other points earned not included in the final totals. Relinquished points are shown within brackets.

Some rounds were also open to cars from other categories (e.g. Group 6 "Two Seater Racing Cars") however these cars were not eligible to score points for their respective makes.

=== Division - Over 2 Litre ===
Pos	Make	Rd 1	Rd 2	Rd 3	Rd 4	Rd 5	Rd 6	Rd 7	Rd 8	Rd 9	Total
1	(Germany) Porsche	20	20	20	20	20	20	20	(20)	(20)	140
2	(Italy) Ferrari	15					15				30
3	(Italy) de Tomaso		6								6
4	(United Kingdom) Triumph							4			4
5	(Germany) BMW							1			1

=== Division - Under 2 Litre ===
Pos	Make	Rd 1	Rd 2	Rd 3	Rd 4	Rd 5	Rd 6	Rd 7	Rd 8	Rd 9	Total
1	(Italy) Lancia					10	20		20		50
2	(Germany) BMW					20			12		32
3	(United States) Ford					15	15				30
	(Germany) Porsche							15		15	30
5	(Italy) Fiat									20	20
6	(Germany) Volkswagen					6					6
7	(Germany) Audi					2					2

== The cars ==
The following models contributed to the nett points totals scored by their respective makes.

=== Division - Over 2 Litre ===
- Porsche 935 & 911 Carrera RSR
- Ferrari Daytona & 308GTB
- de Tomaso Pantera
- Triumph TR8
- BMW 3.5 CSL

=== Division - Under 2 Litre ===
- Lancia Beta Montecarlo
- BMW 320i
- Ford Escort
- Porsche
- Fiat X1/9
- Volkswagen Golf GTi
- Audi 80
