= Tony Garcia (racing driver) =

Cuban American former racing driver

Antonio (Tony) Garcia
- Nationality: Cuban American
- Born: September 14, 1945 (age 81) Havana, Cuba
- Retired: 1985
- Years active: 1971 - 1985
- Teams: German Motors, Inc. & Chem Air Spray, Inc. Delta Racing Montura Ranch Estates Conrad Racing Montura Racing DeNarvaez Enterprises Florida Crystals/Montura Racing Tony Garcia Racing B de T Racing Sauber Racing Switzerland Conte Racing Hartge Motorsport Ralph Sanchez Racing E. J. Pruitt
- Car number: 83 - 72 - 30 - 44 - 54 - 82 - 46 - 84
- Co-driver: Montalvo / Gomez- Mena / Alberto Naon / De Cardenas De Narváez/Freyre / Ouellette / Vadia / Herman Cruz / Sereix / Stiff / Montoya / Ullon / Mcfarlin Fittipaldi / Morton / Spenard / Adamowicz / Lonbenberg
- Wins: 1st: 5 times 2nd: 10 times 3rd : 4 times Top 3 finishes: 19 times
- Poles: 19

Awards
- Most Improved Driver 1980 IMSA GTO

Antonio "Tony" Garcia (born September 14, 1945, in Havana, Cuba) is a Cuban American former racing driver. Over the course of his career, Garcia had raced more than eighty professional races. Garcia was also the first Hispanic driver, along with Alberto Vadia, to win the 24 Hours of Daytona (GTO) in 1980.

== Early life ==
Garcia was born on September 14, 1945, in Havana, Cuba. His father was an attorney, mostly working in real estate cases. When Garcia was 12 years old, he got his first motorcycle with the help of his sister, despite his mother being opposed to him racing. He was brought along to watch motorsport races in Cuba since he was ten years old, by a family friend Juan Montalvo. In 1960, his family left the country when the Communist regime of Fidel Castro started to take full control of Cuba, and moved to Miami, Florida, and Garcia subsequently enrolled at St. Patrick's High School.

== Career ==
Garcia raced for IMSA GT Championship between 1971 and 1985. In 1975, he won his first professional race (GTU) in the 12 hour Sebring. In 1980 IMSA GT Championship hi finish first in GTO at Daytona International Speedway, Riverside California Raceway and the 100 miles Laguna Seca in Monterey, California. In 1982, he raced in the 1982 World Sportscar Championship at the 6 Hours of Silverstone finishing first in GTO and the 24 Hours of Le Mans, driving a BMW M1. In the 1983 24 Hours of Le Mans, he finished ninth with the Sauber C7, just behind eight Porsche 956s, breaking the perfect top 10 of the Porsche team.Porsche used that result to create the poster "Nobody’s perfect". He also drove in the Grand Prix of Miami in 1983, finishing seventh, and in 1985, finishing in third position.

== Trophies ==
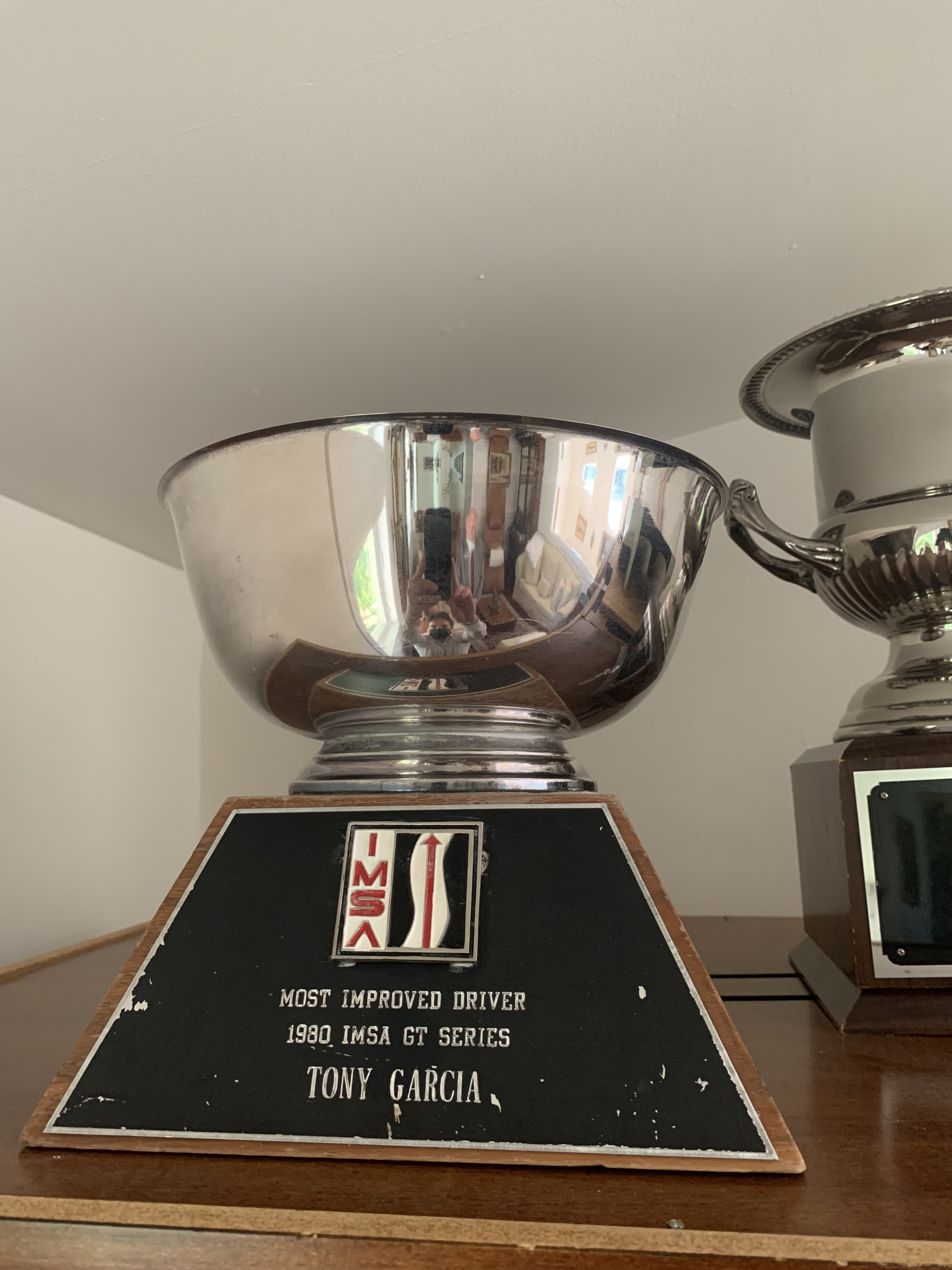
Most Improved Driver IMSA 1980

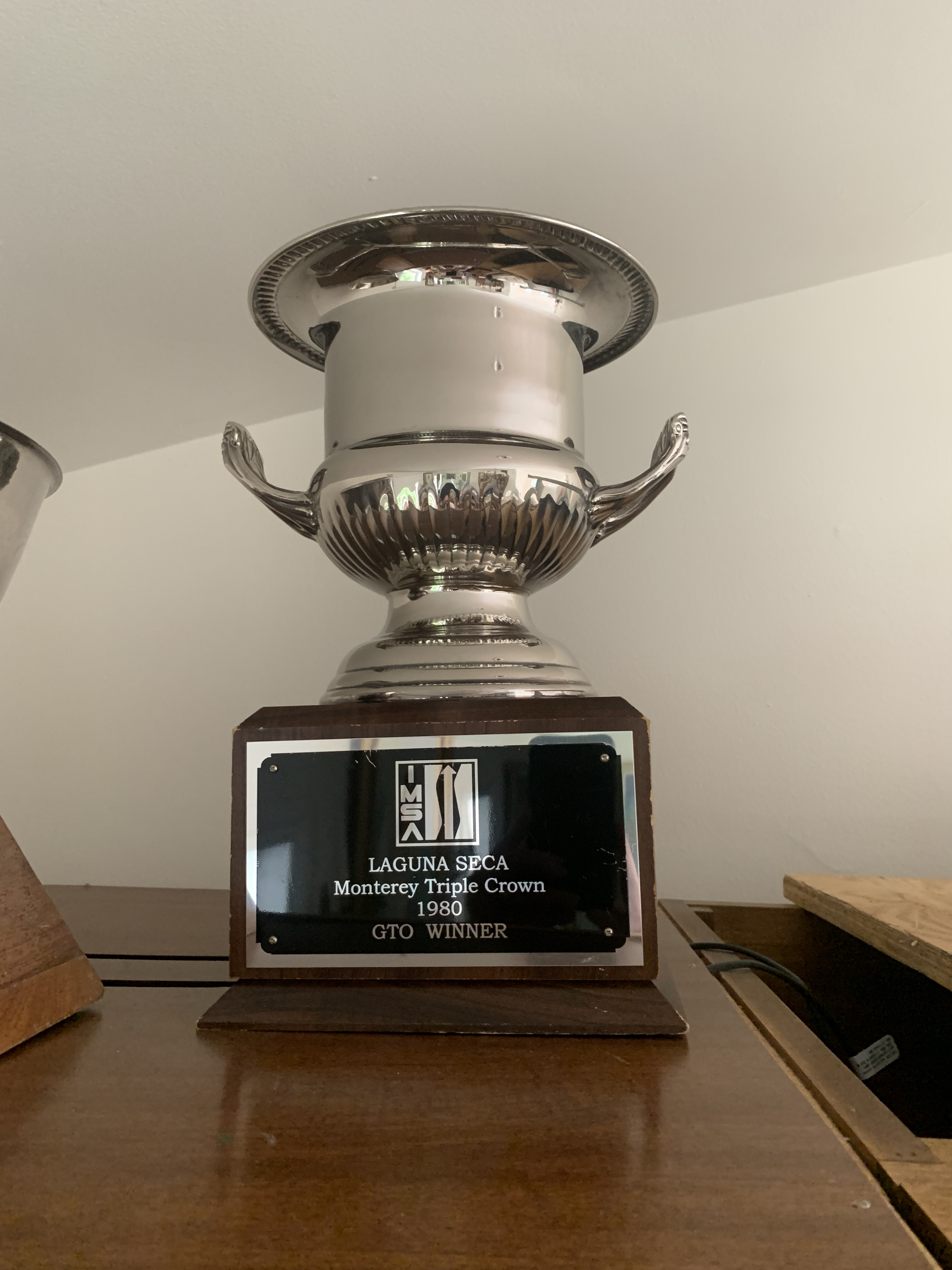
Laguna Seca Monterrey Triple Crow GTO Winner 1980

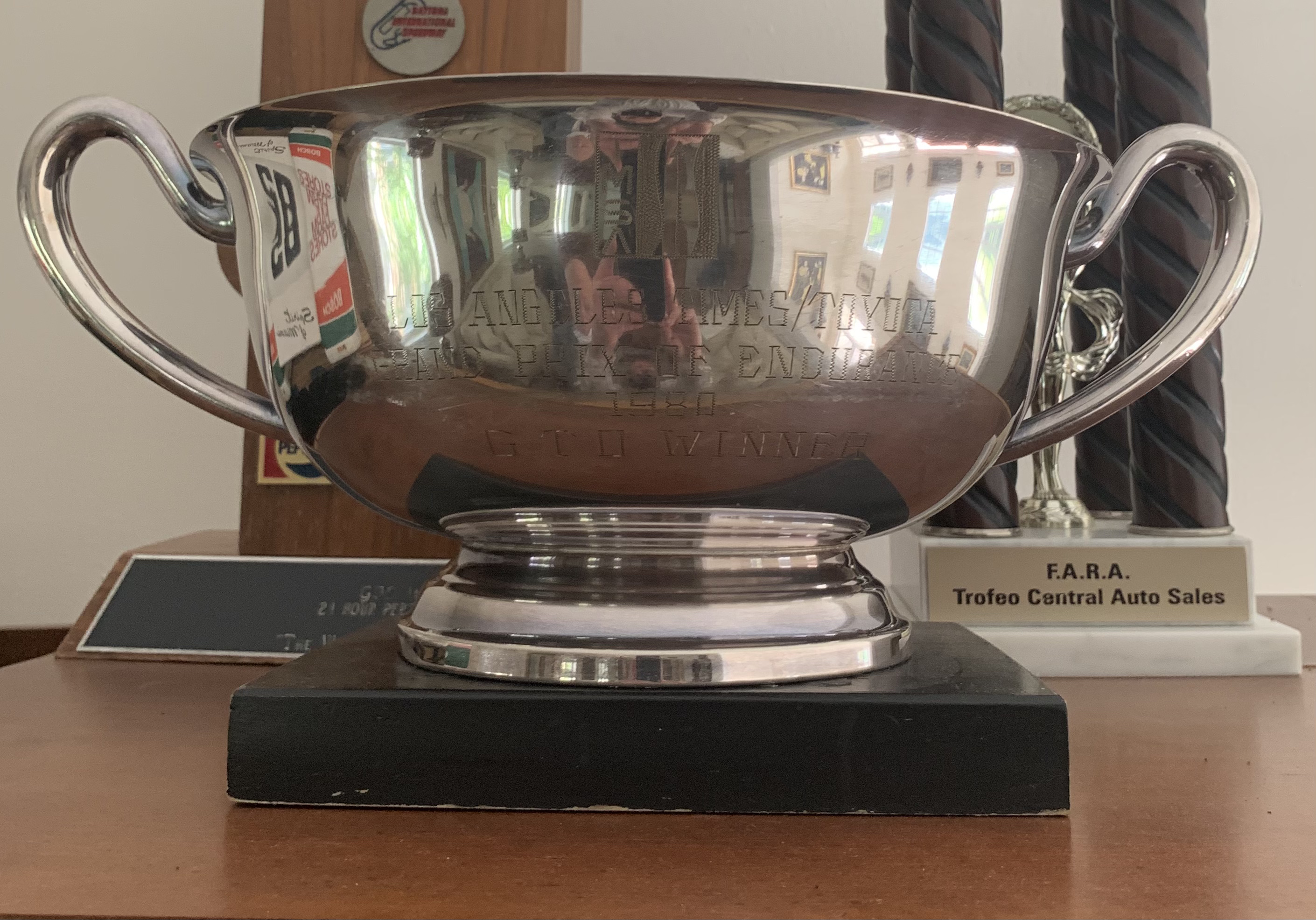
Los Angeles Times / Toyota Grand Prix Of Endurance 1980 GTO Winner
