= Volkert Merl =

German racing driver

Volkert Merl (born 10 February 1944) is a German retired racing driver.

Merl primarily competed for Joest Racing throughout his career in the early 1980s competing in the World Sportscar Championship and Deutsche Rennsport Meisterschaft (DRM). He won the 1980 24 Hours of Daytona with Rolf Stommelen and Reinhold Joest in a Porsche 935 and placed second in 1983 DRM championship points in a Porsche 956. That same year, he also finished fourth in the 24 Hours of Le Mans.

== Racing record ==
=== 24 Hours of Le Mans results ===
Year	Team	Co-drivers	Car	Class	Laps	Pos.	Class pos.
1980	(Switzerland) Meccarillos Racing	(France) Bernard Béguin (Switzerland) Claude Haldi	Porsche 935-K3/80	Gr. 5 SP 2.0+	37	DNF	DNF
1983	(Germany) Sorga S. A./Joest Racing	(Colombia) Mauricio de Narváez (Germany) Clemens Schickentanz	Porsche 956	C	361	4th	4th
1984	(Germany) New-Man Joest Racing (Germany) Schornstein Racing Team	(Germany) Dieter Schornstein (Germany) "John Winter"	Porsche 956	C1	340	5th	5th
