= Bob Akin =

American journalist, TV commentator & sports car racing driver (1936-2002)

- Born: Robert Macomber Akin III; March 6, 1936; North Tarrytown, New York
- Died: April 29, 2002 (aged 66); Atlanta, Georgia

Robert Macomber Akin III (March 6, 1936 – April 29, 2002) was an American business executive, journalist, television commentator and champion sports car racing driver.

== Biography ==
Bob Akin was born March 6, 1936, in North Tarrytown, N.Y., and was raised in Sleepy Hollow Manor. He was educated at Hackley School in Tarrytown and later served on its board for 30 years and as president from 1980 to 1990. At Columbia University, he earned a bachelor's degree in engineering and a master's degree in business administration. He spent 40 years with the Hudson Wire Company in Ossining, N.Y., which was founded by his grandfather in 1901, and was president from 1974 until he retired in 1995. In 1989, the company was dominating the worldwide aircraft and aerospace wiring market when it was sold to the Phelps Dodge Corporation.

Akin began his racing career in 1957, competing in outboard boat racing and in drag racing in 1957 and 1958. He switched to road racing, acquiring his amateur SCCA national racing license in 1959 and hired legendary sports car racer John Fitch as his driving coach. Proving a quick study, he piloted an Alfa Veloce Spider to his first win in only his third race at Bridgehampton. He drove a front engine Volpini Formula Junior in 1960, then switched to a 1957 Ferrari 500 TRC for several races during the early part of the 1961 season, before retiring in July of that year, to concentrate on the family business.

Almost by accident, Akin returned to racing in 1973, after accepting an invitation from his friend, Sam Posey, to drive a few laps in his Mercedes-Benz 300SL, at the July 4th, 1973 Vintage Sports Car Club of America event at Lime Rock Park. Within a month, he was back at it in earnest, driving a Lotus 11 in vintage racing events until switching to the 1959 Cooper-Monaco that would prove to be his favorite racer, in 1975.

In 1978, Akin purchased a Porsche RSR Carrera thinking it would be fun to run in the 1978 12 Hours of Sebring. They ran what was considered to be a test run at Daytona, before the Sebring event, then continued on racing a full season that would include racing at Le Mans with a Porsche 935 Turbo. Now solidly back in the drivers seat, compiled an impressive list of achievements, highlighted by a 6-Hour win at Watkins Glen, '79 and '86 12 Hours of Sebring victories, two second-place finishes in the '81 and '82 24 Hours of Daytona, six appearances, including a fourth overall in '84, at Le Mans. He won the IMSA Camel GT series in 1986 and had four top-ten finishes in IMSA Endurance Championship points standings. He was also a member and former president of the prestigious Road Racing Drivers Club.

Akin retired from professional racing in 1991 but stayed quite active in the sport. He returned to racing his beloved vintage and historic cars, competed in the Fastmasters racing series, wrote articles for Road & Track magazine, and did on-air commentary for Speedvision, TBS and ESPN television. Following his retirement from Hudson Wire Company, in 1995, Akin also devoted his time to the management of Bob Akin Motorsports (Now Hudson Historics), which specializes in the restoration and race preparation of historic race cars.

On April 25, 2002, Akin was gravely injured in a violent crash while testing a powerful (900-plus horsepower, twin-turbocharged V-6) 1988 Nissan GTP ZX-Turbo for the Walter Mitty Challenge for historic cars at Road Atlanta. His injuries included a broken neck, left leg, left shoulder and right arm, along with third-degree burns over 15 percent of his body. He was airlifted to Grady Memorial Hospital after the accident. After briefly rallying, the 66-year-old succumbed due to complications from his injuries on April 29, 2002.

== The Bob Akin Memorial Motorsports Award ==
In memory of Akin, the Road Racing Drivers Club (RRDC) established the Bob Akin Memorial Motorsports Award, in 2003. The selection committee consists of Brian Redman, Judy Stropus and Bob's son, Bobby Akin. The permanent trophy, designed by Steuben Glass, in Corning, New York, is inscribed with the name and year of award of each annual recipient, and displayed at the International Motor Racing Research Center at Watkins Glen, New York. Individual replica trophies are given to each honoree.

"The Akin award is for 'speed with style' which aptly describes Bob Akin" said RRDC President Bobby Rahal. "Not every member of the RRDC is a professional driver, but every one loves racing and is a good guy, and that perfectly describes Bob." The Road Racing Drivers Club presents the Bob Akin Memorial Motorsports Award annually to the race driver who exemplifies the characteristics for which Bob was known and respected:

- A passion for motorsports and automobiles
- A history of successful amateur and/or vintage racing
- A high level of sportsmanship and fair play
- An articulate and courteous presence
- A sharp wit and mischievous sense of humor
- A broad range of interests and meticulous attention to detail
- A record of contribution to motorsports and the community
- A devotion to family and friends

=== Bob Akin Memorial Motorsports Award Recipients ===
2003 – Sam Posey

2004 – Charlie Gibson

2005 – John Fitch

2006 – Jim Haynes

2007 – Cameron Argetsinger

2008 – Jim Downing

2009 – Steven J. Earle

2010 – Augie Pabst

2011 – Don Knowles

2012 – Miles Collier

2013 – Peter Sachs

2014 – Bill Warner

2015 – Judy Stropus

2016 – Murray Smith

2017 – Archie Urciuoli

2018 – Jeff Zwart

2019 – Rob Dyson

2020 – No Award Given

2021 – Jeremy Shaw

2022 – John Fergus

2023 – Tom Davey

2024 – Patrick Long

== Racing record ==
=== 24 Hours of Le Mans results ===
Year	Team	Co-drivers	Car	Class	Laps	Pos.	Class pos.
1978	(United States) Dick Barbour Racing	(United States) Steve Earle (United States) Bob Garretson	Porsche 935-77	IMSA; GTX	159	DNF	DNF
1979	(United States) Dick Barbour Racing	(United States) Rob McFarlin (United States) Roy Woods	Porsche 935/77A	IMSA; GTX	78	DNF	DNF
1980	(United States) Racing Associates Inc.	(United States) Ralph Kent-Cooke (United States) Paul Miller	Porsche 935 K3/79	IMSA	237	DNF	DNF
1981	(United States) Bob Akin Motor Racing	(United States) Paul Miller (United States) Craig Siebert	Porsche 935-K3/80	IMSA; GTX	320	DNF	DNF
1982	(United States) Bob Akin Motor Racing	(United States) David Cowart (United States) Kenper Miller	Porsche 935-L1	IMSA; GTX	15	DNF	DNF
1984	(Switzerland) Brun Motorsport	(Germany) Prince Leopold von Bayern (Switzerland) Walter Brun	Porsche 956B	C1	340	4th	4th

=== 12 Hours of Sebring results ===
Year	Team	Co-drivers	Car	Class	Laps	Pos.	Class pos.
1978	(United States) Earle & Akin Racing	(United States) Steve Earle (United States) Rick Knoop	Porsche 911 Carrera RSR	GTX	225	5th	4th
1979	(United States) Dick Barbour Racing	(United States) Rob McFarlin (United States) Roy Woods	Porsche 935	GTX	239	1st	1st
1980	(United States) Mendez/Woods/Akin	(United States) Skeeter McKitterick (United States) Roy Woods	Porsche 935 K3	GTX	232	5th	5th
1981	(United States) Bob Akin Motor Racing	(United Kingdom) Derek Bell (United States) Craig Siebert	Porsche 935 K3	GTX	62	DNF	DNF
1982	(United States) Bob Akin Motor Racing	(United Kingdom) Derek Bell (United States) Craig Siebert	Porsche 935-K3/80	GTP	212	12th	6th
1983	(United States) Bob Akin Motor Racing	(United States) John O'Steen (United States) Dale Whittington	Porsche 935-K3/80	GTP	231	2nd	1st
1984	(United States) Bob Akin Motor Racing	(United States) John O'Steen (Germany) Hans-Joachim Stuck	Porsche 935-84	GTP	256	5th	5th
1985	(United States) Bob Akin Motor Racing	(United States) Jim Mullen (Germany) Hans-Joachim Stuck	Porsche 962	GTP	66	DNF	DNF
1986	(United States) Bob Akin Motor Racing	(Austria) Jo Gartner (Germany) Hans-Joachim Stuck	Porsche 962	GTP	287	1st	1st
1987	(United States) Bob Akin Motor Racing	(United States) Steve Shelton (United Kingdom) James Weaver	Porsche 962	GTP	280	6th	5th

== Primary Information Sources ==
NY Times Obituary, dated May 3, 2002, Bob Akin, 66, Auto Racer Who Won at Sebring Twice

Internet Source: Dark Horse Racing

Internet Source: Hudson Historics About Us

Internet Source: Historic Racing

Internet Source: Road Racing Drivers Club
