= Kees Nierop =

Dutch racing driver

- Nationality: Dutch
- Born: 16 March 1958 (age 68) Purmerend, Netherlands
- Debut season: 1978

Championship titles
- 1983, 1978, 1986: Canadian GT-1 Championship, 12 Hours of Sebring, 1986 rothman's Porsche champion, 1987 Porsche factory driver at LeMans

Kees Nierop (born 16 March 1958 in Purmerend, the Netherlands) is a Dutch former professional racing driver. He won the 1983 12 Hours of Sebring race while driving a Porsche 934. He is also credited with being the only Canadian to have his name on a Porsche factory race car, which is displayed in the Porsche Museum located in Stuttgart, Germany.
