= Gianpiero Moretti =

Italian racing driver

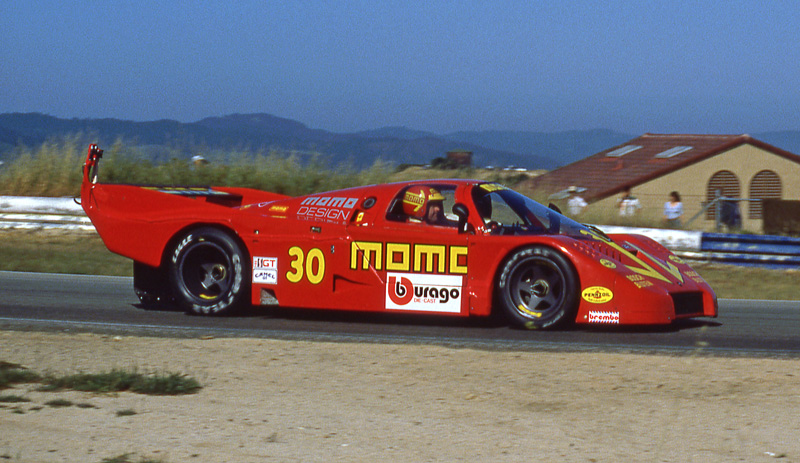
- Moretti racing at Laguna Seca in 1984
- Born: 20 March 1940; Milan, Italy
- Died: 14 January 2012 (aged 71); Milan, Italy
- Occupations: Racing driver and businessman
- Known for: Winner 24 Hours of Daytona 1998; Founder of MOMO automotive accessory company

Gianpiero Moretti (20 March 1940 – 14 January 2012) was an Italian racing driver and the founder of the MOMO company in the 1960s. He was born in Milan.

Moretti won the 24 Hours of Daytona, in 1998, driving a Ferrari 333SP with co-drivers Mauro Baldi, Arie Luyendyk and Didier Theys. Moretti died on 14 January 2012 in Milan of cancer. He was 71.
