= Bumblebee (disambiguation) =

A bumblebee is a flying insect of the genus Bombus.

Bumblebee or bumble bee may also refer to:

== Biology ==
=== Fish ===
- Bumblebee catfish, several species
- Bumblebee cichlid, Pseudotropheus crabro
- Bumblebee goby, species of the genus Brachygobius
- Bumblebee grouper or giant grouper

=== Other organisms ===
- Bumblebee orchid (Ophrys bombyliflora)
- Bumblebee shrimp (Caridina trifasciata)
- Striped bumblebee shrimp (Gnathophyllum americanum)
- Bumblebee bat or Kitti's hog-nosed bat
- Bumblebee hummingbird
- Bumblebee poison frog or yellow-banded poison dart frog
- Bumble bee scarab beetle

== Music ==
=== Songs ===
- "Flight of the Bumblebee", an orchestral interlude written by Nikolai Rimsky-Korsakov for his opera The Tale of Tsar Saltan, composed in 1899–1900
- "Bumble Bee", originally recorded by Memphis Minnie in 1929
- "Bumble Bee" (LaVern Baker song), 1960, made popular by The Searchers in 1965 (UK #1 EP)
- "Bumblebee", by Ween on the 1990 album GodWeenSatan: The Oneness
- "Bumble Bee", 1999, by Desirée Sparre-Enger (Bambee)
- "Bumble Bees", 2000, by Aqua
- "Bumblebeee", 2014, by Kasabian
- "Bumblebees", 2015, by Bloodhound Gang
- "Bumble Bee" (Zedd and Botnek song), 2015, by DJ Zedda
- "Bumblebee", by Smokepurpp and Murda Beatz from the 2018 mixtape Bless Yo Trap
- "Bumblebee" (Lead song), 2018 single by Japanese hip-hop group Lead
- "Bumblebee", by ABBA on the 2021 album Voyage

=== Other uses in music ===
- Bumblebee Records, which released the first solo album by Kenji Ueda
- "Bumble bee", a Frankenstrat guitar
- Hummel (instrument) ("bumble bee") an old Swedish stringed instrument which produces a droning sound

== Transportation ==
- ADI Bumble Bee, an American gyrocopter
- Bumble-Bee (livery), an informal name for the black and yellow New Zealand railway locomotive livery
- Bumble Bee II, the world's smallest piloted airplane
- Freewind Bumble B, a French gyrocopter
- Bumblebee Edition, an edition of the Saturn S-Series
- Bumblebee Limited Edition, an edition of the Porsche 914
- Humlebien ("Bumblebee"), the nickname for the Type C Nimbus motorcycle
- Nelson Bumblebee, a glider produced by Nelson Aircraft

== Military ==
=== Operations ===
- Operation Bumblebee, a top secret US Navy program designed to develop rockets and ramjets at the end of World War II
- Operation Teardrop, originally code-named "Operation Bumblebee", a US Navy operation of World War II
- Operation Bumblebee, in the Korean War in by the 3rd Battalion 7th Marines

=== Vehicles and weapons ===
- Hummel (vehicle) ("Bumble Bee"), a self-propelled artillery gun used by the German Wehrmacht during World War II
- Bumbar ("Bumble Bee"), a short-range portable anti-tank missile system developed and produced by Serbia
- RPO-A Shmel (Bumblebee), a man-portable rocket launcher produced and exported by Russia and the former Soviet Union
- Beriev A-50 ("bumble bee" in Russian), an AWACS aircraft

== People ==
- Bumble Bee Slim (1905–1968), American blues singer
- Sergei Chernyshev (breakdancer), Russian breakdancer (professional nickname "Bumblebee")

== Places ==
- Bumble Bee, Arizona, a US ghost town
- Bumblebee, California, near Bumblebee Creek, US

== Fiction ==
- Bumblebee (Transformers), a car robot superhero in the American Transformers robot superhero franchise
- Bumblebee (film), 2018, based on the Transformers character
- Bumblebee (DC Comics), a superheroine
- Bumblebee Man, a character from The Simpsons

== Other uses ==
- Bumble Bee Foods, a commercial brand of canned fish and other food products
- Bumblebee models, in mathematical physics, field theories with spontaneous Lorentz violation
- Drozd BB rifle or "bumblebee", marked as such for its color scheme and sound
- Operation Bumblebee (UK), an anti-burglary campaign undertaken by London's Metropolitan Police
- Bumble Bee, a brightly coloured children's ride at Marineland
- "Bumble Bee 1", the nickname for the first C2-class Melbourne tram
- BumbleBee, a plastic ball-bearing transaxle yo-yo produced by Duncan Toys Company
- Bumblebee Project, an Nvidia Optimus implementation for Linux

== See also ==
- Bhrngadutam ("The bumblebee messenger"), a Sanskrit minor poem
- Bumble (disambiguation)
- Bumblebeewolf, a species of bee-hunting wasp
- Buhmble Bee, a member of Nemesis (rap crew)
- Dumbledor (disambiguation) (an obsolete word for bumblebee)
- Gita milindam ("Song of the Bumblebee") in Sanskrit, first published in 1999
