= Porsche 914-6 GT =

1970-1972 Porsche race car

Porsche 914/6 GT
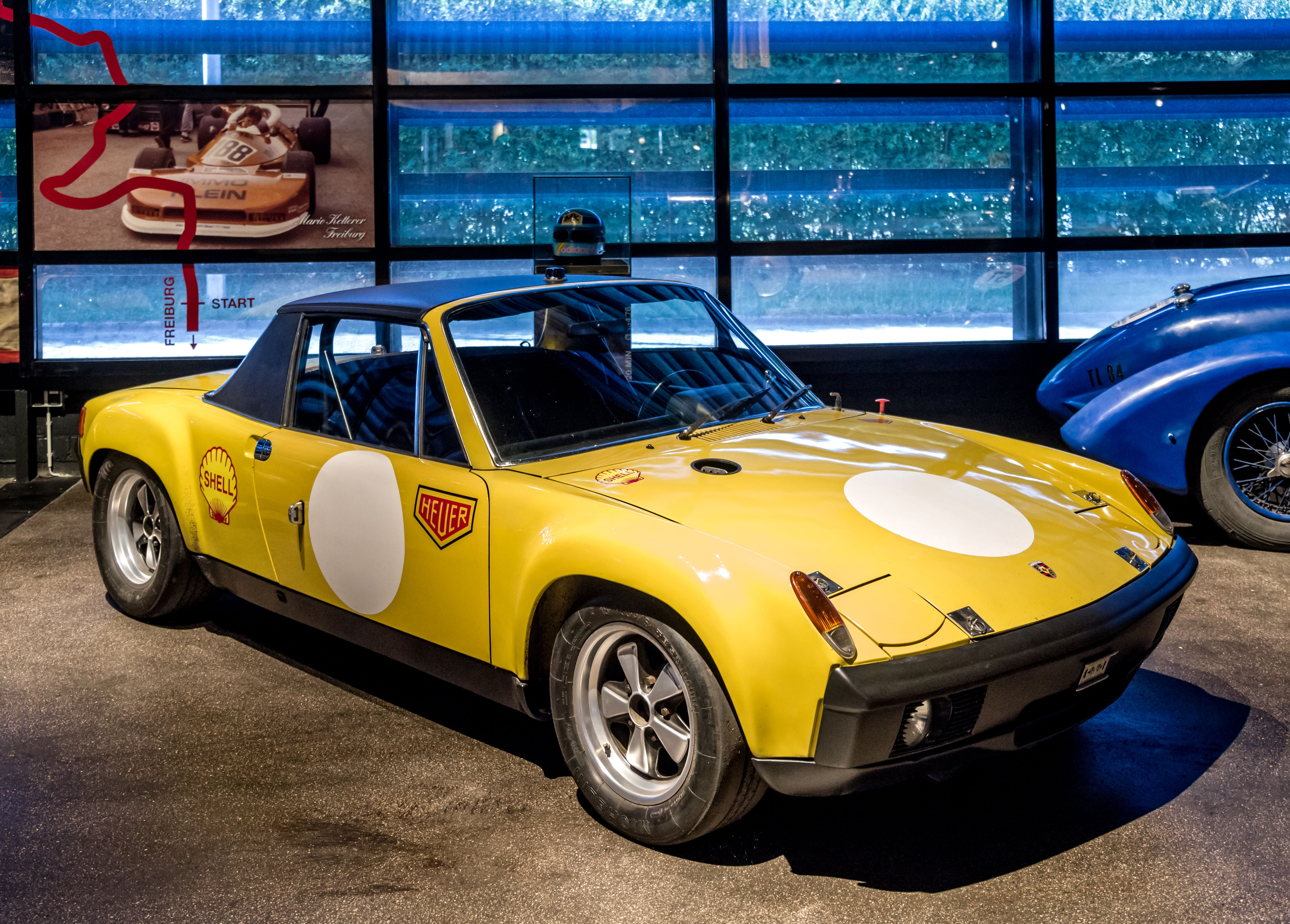

Overview
- Manufacturer: Porsche
- Production: 1970–1972
- Assembly: Karmann
- Designer: Ferdinand Alexander Porsche, Heinrich Klie

Body and chassis
- Class: Sports car
- Body style: Targa Coupé
- Layout: Mid engined
- Related: Porsche 917

Powertrain
- Engine: 2.0 L flat-6

Chronology
- Predecessor: Porsche 912
- Successor: Porsche 924

The Porsche 914/6 GT was a race car built by Porsche, based on the 914 model with a 6-cylinder engine and GT package.

== History ==
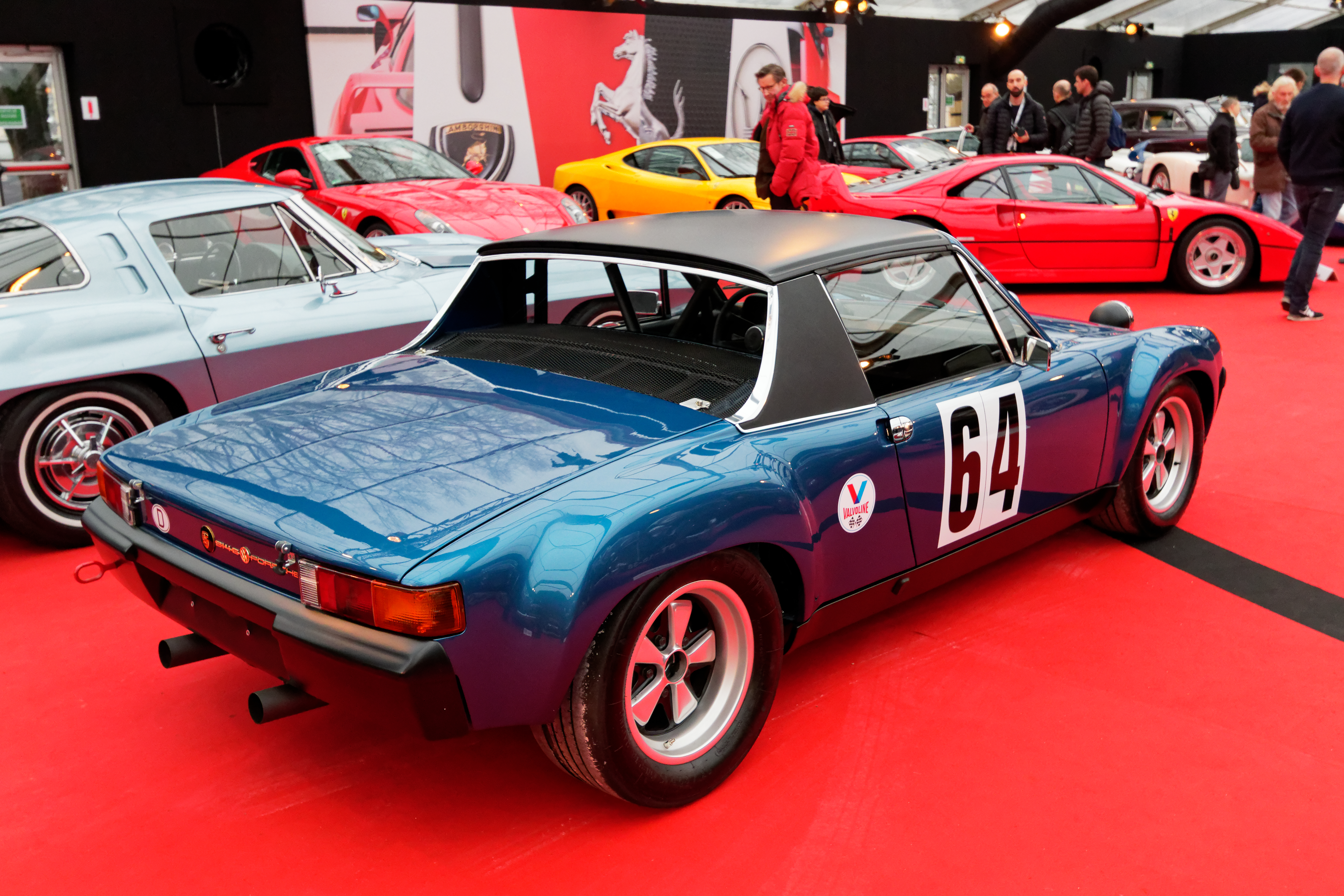
Porsche 914/6 GT rear view

The 914/6 GT was a race configured version of the 914/6. The factory offered the GT option, which was distinguishable by its box-like steel fender flares. It quickly became known as the 914/6 GT and was raced employing different engine configurations. This included the 'T' specification, which was a basic 911 engine. Another popular configuration was to use a converted Carrera 6 engine.

In 1970, a 914/6 with the factory's GT option was entered in the grueling 1970 24 Hours of Le Mans race. The car, identified as #40, was driven by Claude Ballot-Léna and Guy Chasseuil. It finished sixth over all, preceded only by prototype-like racecars like the V12 Ferrari 512S and Flat-12 Porsche 917K. In addition, the #40 Sonauto, a non factory entry, won not only its class (GT 2.0) but also the class above (GT 2.5) beating all the Porsche 911S including all the factory 911 entries.

914/6s also competed in some of the most important race competitions of its era, e.g. Targa Florio with Brian Redman, Monte Carlo Rally and Daytona International Speedway. Walt Maas successfully campaigned a 914/6 "GT" in the IMSA race series.

The basic Porsche 914/6 was introduced in September 1969 and was a collaborative effort between Porsche and Volkswagen. Short lived, only 3360 examples were produced between 1970 and 1972. Sitting very low, the 914/6's suspension is a combination of a 911-type torsion bar front suspension with a rear coil spring suspension. It also features Porsche disc brakes. The headlights hide in the hood and pop-up when needed. Its targa top can be stored in the rear trunk. The 914/6 received the ram-tuned Weber carbureted 2.0-litre flat six 110 hp Porsche engine that had been previously used with the basic 1969 911T. Weighing just under 2,100 pounds (950 kg), the 914/6 proved to be considerably faster. A five-speed manual gearbox was standard equipment on all models.

In 2020, a 914/6 GT was sold for $995,000 at the Gooding & Company auction in Scottsdale, Arizona, the most valuable 914 ever sold.
