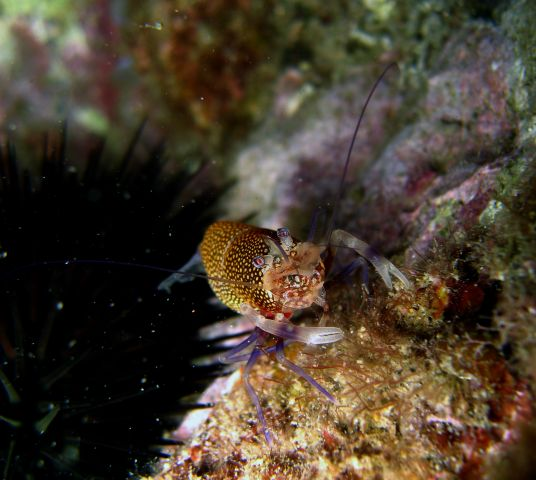
- Gnathophyllum elegans

Scientific classification
- Domain: Eukaryota
- Kingdom: Animalia
- Phylum: Arthropoda
- Class: Malacostraca
- Order: Decapoda
- Suborder: Pleocyemata
- Infraorder: Caridea
- Family: Palaemonidae
- Genus: Gnathophyllum
- Species: G. elegans

Binomial name
- Gnathophyllum elegans (Risso, 1816)

Synonyms
- Drymo elegans Risso, 1816

= Gnathophyllum elegans =

Species of crustacean

Gnathophyllum elegans is a species of shrimps found in the Mediterranean and the Atlantic Ocean. The type specimen was found near Nice, France. It is active at night.
