= Guy Chasseuil =

French racing driver (born 1942)

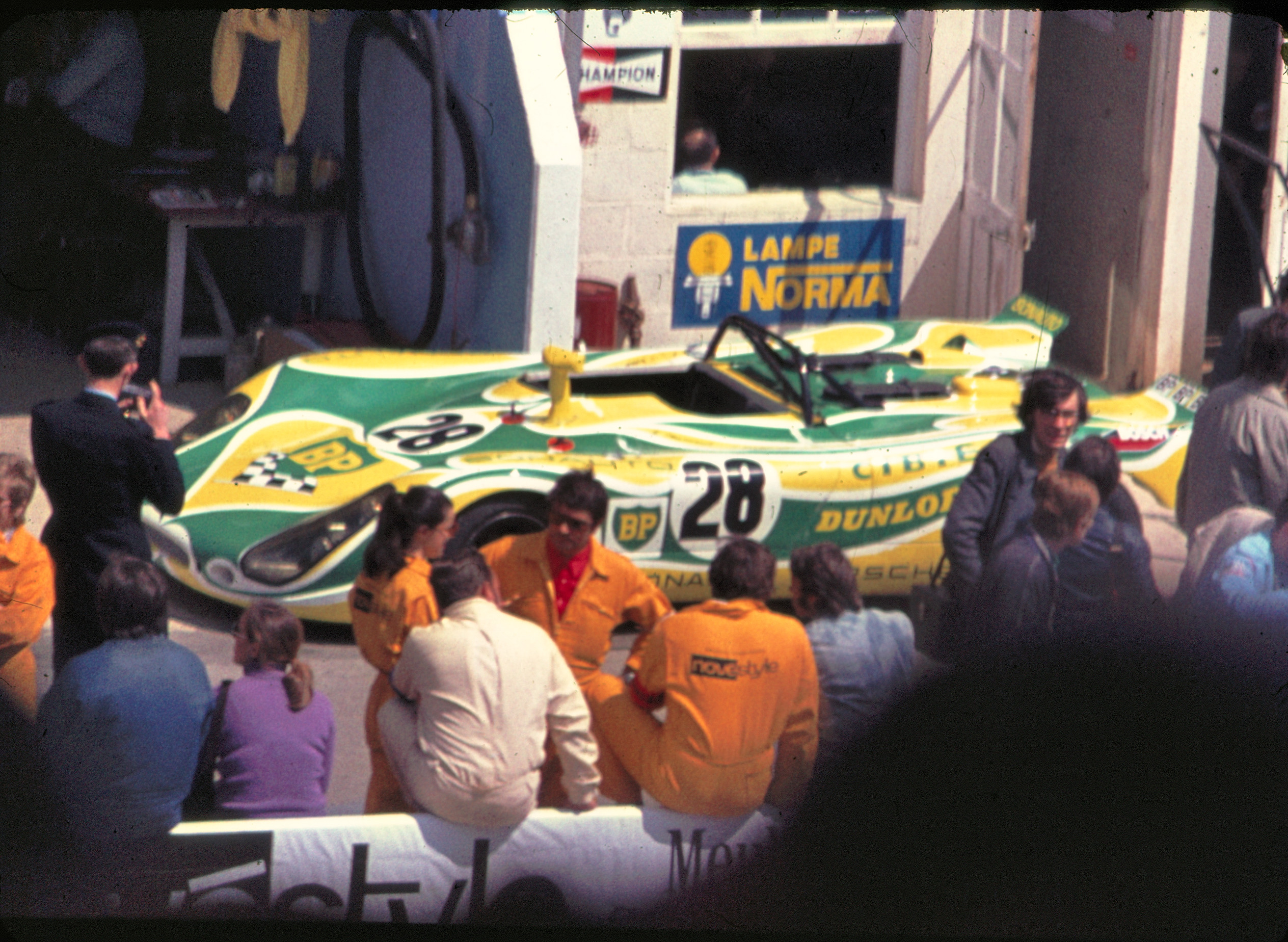
- Porsche 908/2 Spyder in the 1971 24 Hours of Le Mans
- Nationality: (France) French
- Born: 26 January 1942 (age 84) Paris, Ile-de-France
- Debut season: 1966

Guy Chasseuil (born 26 January 1942 in Paris) is a French former racing driver. During his racing career he specialized in rallying and endurance racing.

== Career ==
Chasseuil's first major race was the 1966 24 Hours of Spa, driving an NSU 1000 TT.

Chasseuil began his career in the early 1960s in the French Rally Championship, first with co-driver Jean Todt, then Christian Baron. He achieved success in African rallies, but only raced the Paris Dakar once in 1981 in a Porsche 924.

Although he remained active in rallying throughout his career, Chasseuil achieved notable successes in road and circuit racing. In 1968 he made his debut at the 24 Hours of Le Mans, and one year later won the 24-hour race at Spa-Francorchamps with his longtime teammate Claude Ballot-Léna. In 1970, he celebrated his first class victory at Le Mans, when he finished sixth overall with Ballot-Léna in a Porsche 914/6 GT. In 1970, he partnered with Ove Andersson and Björn Waldegård at the Marathon de la Route at the Nürburgring, where the trio placed third overall.

Over the course of his career, Chasseuil had twelve Le Mans starts. He came closest to an overall win in 1975 as a works driver with Ligier. Chasseuil and partner Jean-Louis Lafosse piloted one of three Ligier JS2s. The duo was to drive a conservative race and bring the Ligier safely to the finish. When two JS2s retired during the night, however, team management changed tactics and let the Chasseuil/Lafosse car chase the leaders. The two gradually moved up the field, finishing second to the Gulf GR8 of Jacky Ickx and Derek Bell because they ran out of time.

Chasseuil continued racing sports cars until the early 1980s, appearing at the Sarthe for the last time in 1981. Chasseuil was one of three driving the 917 K/81 for Kremer Racing. The modified twelve-year old design was not competitive, and retired after only 82 laps having damaged an oil line during an off-course excursion.

In the early 1980s, Chasseuil also appeared in some World Rally Championship races. At the 1982 Tour de Corse, he drove a Ferrari 308GTB supplied by the French Ferrari importer Charles Pozzi. Ten years earlier he had driven a Ford GT40 in the same rally.

After his racing career ended, Chasseuil became a stuntman/stunt-driver, and worked on films such as Le Mans, and Ronin.

== Major races ==
- 24 Hours of Le Mans:
  - 2nd place in 1975 with Jean-Louis Lafosse in a Ligier JS2
  - 6th overall, GT Class winner in 1970 with Claude Ballot-Léna in Porsche 914/6 GT
- 24 Hours of Spa:
  - 3rd place in 1967 in a Ford Mustang with Georges Bossuyt
  - Winner in 1969 in a Porsche 911 with Claude Ballot-Léna
- Tour de France automobile
  - 3rd place in 1969 in a Porsche 911
  - 4th place in 1970 in a Porsche 911S
- Coupe du Salon
  - 3rd place in 1969 in Porsche 911S
- Rallye de l'Ouest
  - Winner in 1970 in a Porsche 911. Team Sonauto BP, codriver Christian Baron
- Critérium de Touraine
  - Winner in 1970 in a Porsche 911 Gr.4
- 1000 km of Paris
  - 3rd place in 1970 in a Porsche 908
- 3 Hours of Le Mans
  - Winner in 1971 in a Porsche 908 with Claude Ballot-Léna
- Rallye du Maroc
  - 2nd in 1971 in a Peugeot 504
- Rally Lyon-Charbonnières
  - 3rd in 1973 in a Ford Escort GT/E
- Tour de Corse
  - 4th place in 1973 in a Ford Escort GT/E
- Rallye Côte d'Ivoire
  - 2nd place in 1974 in a Datsun 180 BSSS
  - 2nd place in 1975 in a Datsun 180B
- 4 Hours of Le Mans
  - Winner in 1974 in a Ligier JS2
- Rallye de l'Ouest
  - Winner in 1974 in a Porsche 911
- Rallye de Lorraine
  - 2nd place in 1974 in a Porsche 911 Carrera
- Rallye du Mont-Blanc
  - 2nd place in 1974 in a Porsche 911 Carrera
- Ronde cévenole
  - 2nd place in 1974 in a Porsche 911 Carrera
- French Rally Championship
  - Winner in Groupe 3 in 1974 in a Porsche 911
- Monte Carlo Rally
  - 14th place in 1985, in a Volkswagen Golf GTI

== Racing record ==
=== Complete 24 Hours of Le Mans results ===
Year	Team	Co-Drivers	Car	Class	Laps	Pos.	Class Pos.
1968	(France) Auguste Veuillet	(France) Claude Ballot-Léna	Porsche 911 T	GT; 2.0	224	DNF (Engine)	
1969	(France) Auguste Veuillet	(France) Claude Ballot-Léna	Porsche 911T	GT; 2.0	301	11th	2nd
1970	(France) Établissements Sonauto	(France) Claude Ballot-Léna	Porsche 914/6 GT	GT; 2.0	285	6th	1st
1971	(France) Établissement Sonauto; Auguste Veuillet	(France) Claude Ballot-Léna	Porsche 908/2	P 3.0	169	DNF (Accident)	
1972	(France) Société Franco-Brittanic	(France) Jean Vinatier	De Tomaso Pantera	S +3.0	3	DNF (Engine)	
1973	(France) Sonauto BP Racing	(United States) Peter Gregg	Porsche 911 Carrera RSR	GTS; 3.0	298	14th	3rd
1974	(France) Automobiles Ligier	(France) Michel Leclère	Ligier JS2	S 3.0	82	DNF (Engine)	
1975	(France) Automobiles Ligier Gitanes	(France) Jean-Louis Lafosse	Ligier JS2	S 3.0	336	2nd	2nd
1976	(France) Ecurie Batteries et Piles TS	(France) Claude Ballot-Léna (France) Xavier Mathiot	WM P76	GTP	125	DNF (Fuel cell)	
1977	(France) H. Striebig (private entrant) / BP	(France) Hubert Striebig (West Germany) Helmut Kirchoffer	Porsche 934/5	Gr.5; SP	65	DNF (Fuel pump)	
1978	(France) Auto Daniel Urcun (private entrant)	(France) Jean-Claude Lefévre	Porsche 934	Gr.4; GT	61	DNF (Gearbox)	
1981	(West Germany) Porsche Kremer Racing	(France) Bob Wollek (France) Xavier Lapeyre	Porsche 917K/81	S +2.0	82	DNF (Engine mount)	

=== Complete 24 Hours of Spa results ===
Year	Team	Co-Drivers	Car	Class	Laps	Pos.	Class Pos.
1966		(France) Gérard Larrousse	NSU 1000 TT	Div.2	-	DNF (Piston)	
1967		(Belgium) Georges Bossuyt	Ford Mustang	Div.3	3714 km	3rd	2nd
1969	Sonauto (Porsche France)	(France) Claude Ballot-Léna	Porsche 911	Div.3	4272.231 km	1st	1st
1971	Ecurie Van Stolle	(Belgium) "Chavan"	Alfa Romeo 1300 GTA Junior	Div.1	-	DNF (Piston)	
1974	(France) Automobiles Ligier Maserati	(France) François Migault	Citroën SM Maserati	Div.4	-	DNF (Accident)	
1981	BP Racing	(France) Xavier Lapeyre	Ford Capri III 3.0 S	serT+2.5	-	DNF (Accident)	
