= Hispano Alemán =

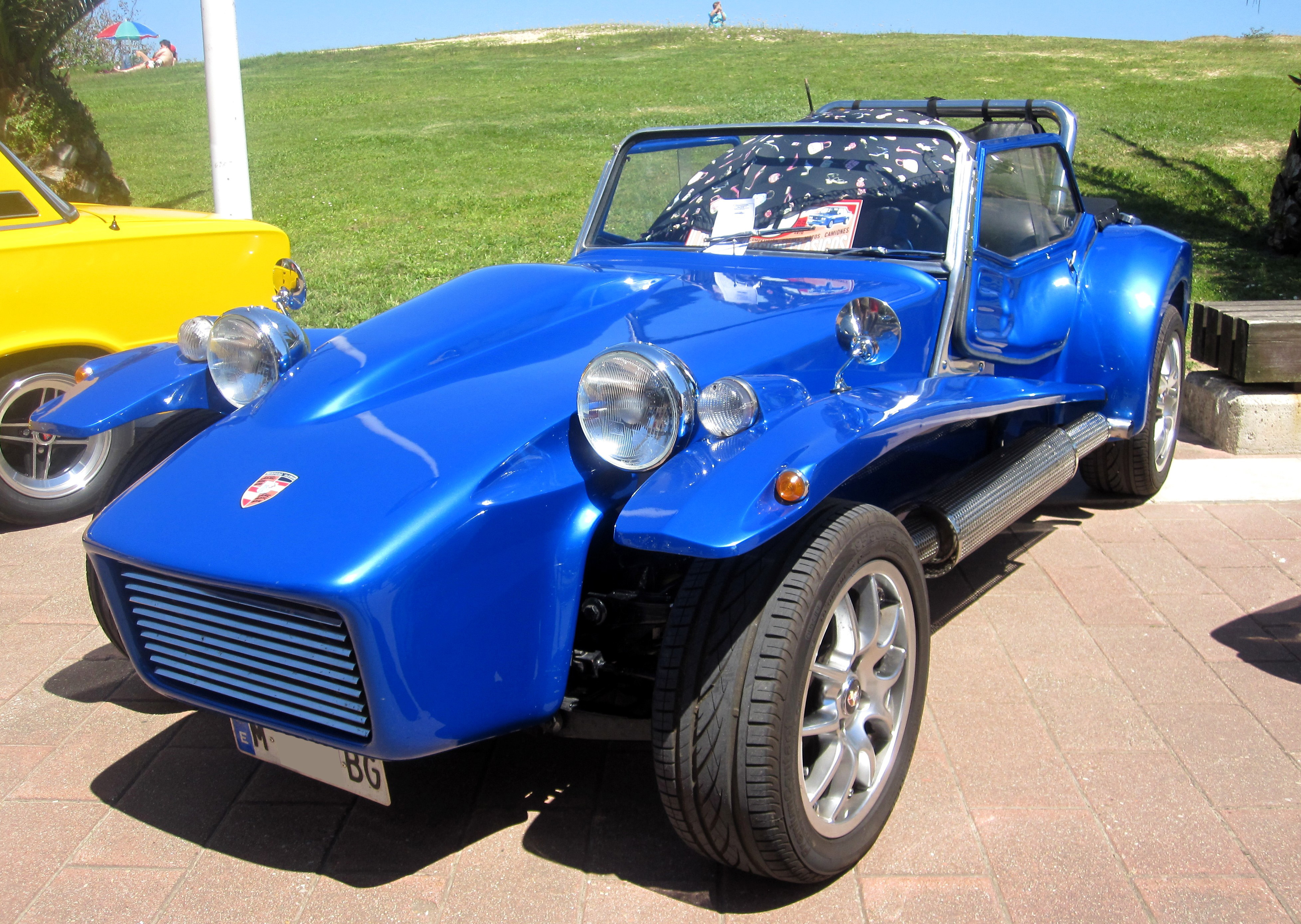
Hispano Alemán Mallorca

Hispano Alemán was a Spanish automobile constructor which entered production in 1970 and disappeared in 1976. It was founded by the German businessman Werner Bernhard Heiderich (1935-2008). The company built four sports car replicas: Mallorca (Lotus Seven), Castilla (Lotus Europa), Vizcaya (Porsche 914) and BMW 328.
