= Bumble (disambiguation) =

Bumble is an online dating service.

Bumble may also refer to:

== Arts and entertainment ==
- Bumble (TV series), a New Zealand children's show, also the title character
- Oliver B. Bumble, a fictional bear in a series of Dutch comic books by Marten Toonder
- Mr. Bumble, a fictional character in Charles Dickens' novel Oliver Twist
- Mr. Bumble, a fictional character in the film Mr. Bug Goes to Town
- "Bumble" or The Abominable Snowman, a fictional monster and the main antagonist in the 1964 TV special Rudolph the Red-Nosed Reindeer
- Bumble, a fictional bee in the British children's TV series Fifi and the Flowertots
- The title character of Buck Bumble, a Nintendo 64 video game
- Bumble, a cat-lemur fairy from the video game Kinectimals

== Other uses ==
- David Lloyd (cricketer) (born 1947), nicknamed Bumble
- Bumble tree may refer to Australian fruiting trees in the caper family:
  - Capparis loranthifolia
  - Capparis mitchellii
- Bumble and bumble, a hair products brand

== See also ==
- The Bumblies, a UK children's TV programme created by Michael Bentine
- Bumblebee (disambiguation)
