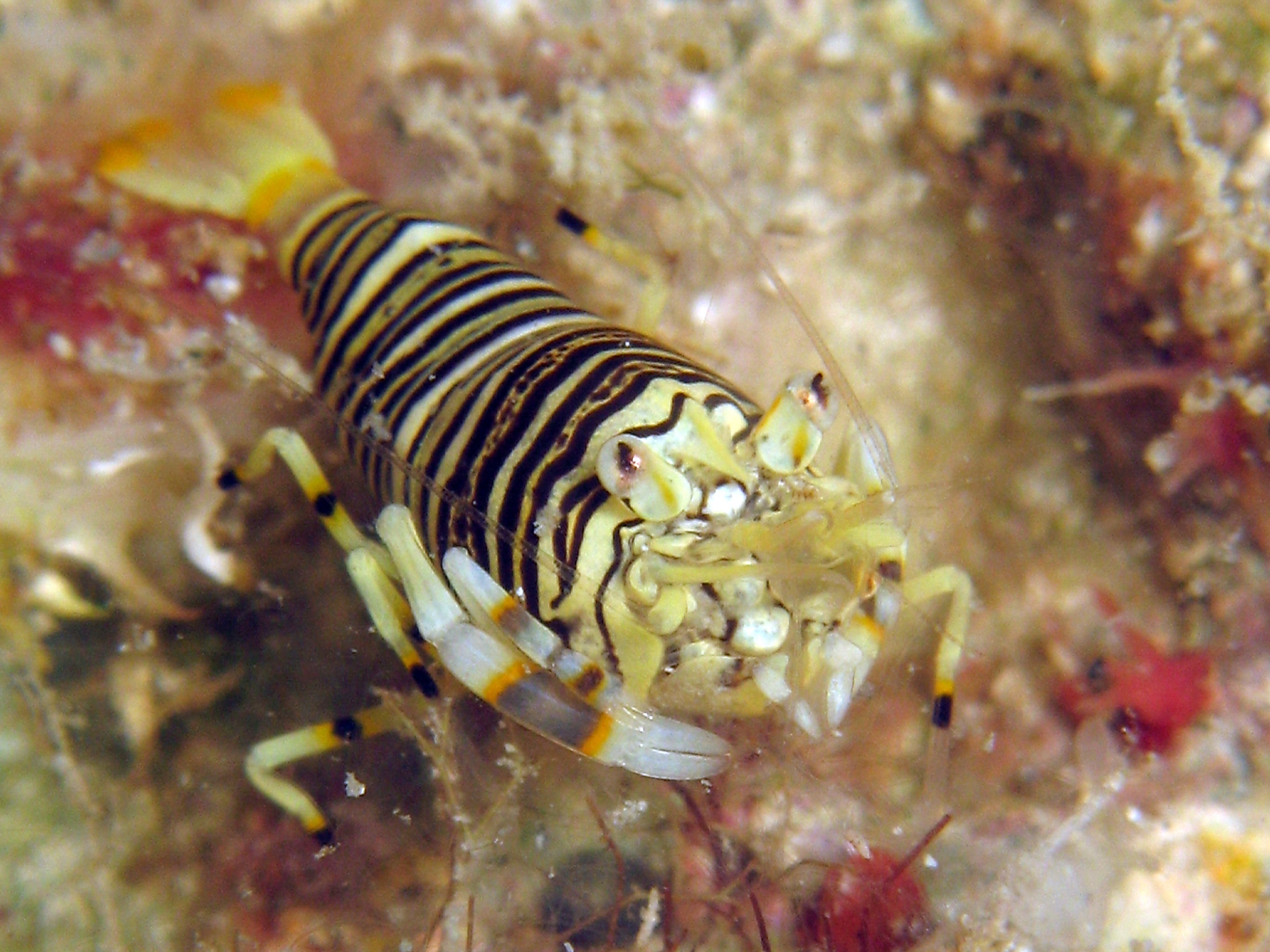
- Gnathophyllum americanum

Scientific classification
- Kingdom: Animalia
- Phylum: Arthropoda
- Class: Malacostraca
- Order: Decapoda
- Suborder: Pleocyemata
- Infraorder: Caridea
- Family: Palaemonidae
- Genus: Gnathophyllum; Latreille, 1819

Species
- See text

= Gnathophyllum =

Genus of crustaceans

Gnathopyllum is a genus of shrimp, containing the following species:

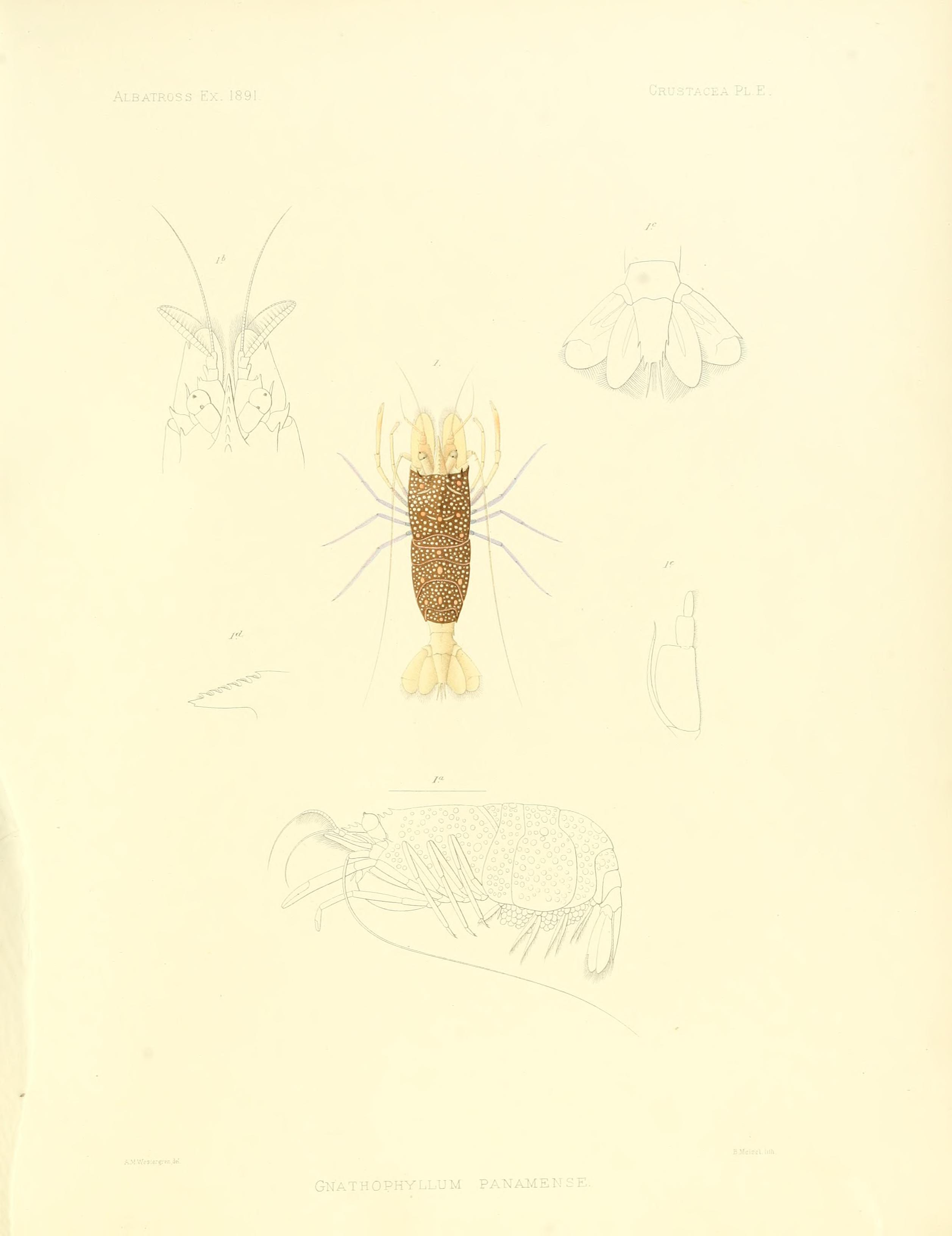
Illustration of G. panamense.

- Gnathophyllum americanum Guérin-Méneville, 1856
- Gnathophyllum ascensione Manning, & Chace, 1990
- Gnathophyllum circellum Manning, 1963
- Gnathophyllum elegans (Risso, 1816)
- Gnathophyllum modestum Hay, 1917
- Gnathophyllum oceanicum Ahyong, 2015
- Gnathophyllum panamense Faxon, 1893
- Gnathophyllum precipuum Titgen, 1989
- Gnathophyllum splendens Chace & Fuller, 1971
- Gnathophyllum taylori Ahyong, 2003
