= Dumbledor =

Dumbledor or dumbledore may refer to:

- Bumblebee (obsolete words dumbledor or dumbledore)
- Cockchafer (obsolete words dumbledore or dumbledarey)
- Albus Dumbledore, a fictional character from J.K. Rowling's Harry Potter series
- Dumbledor, ferocious winged insects in J.R.R. Tolkien's poem "Errantry"
