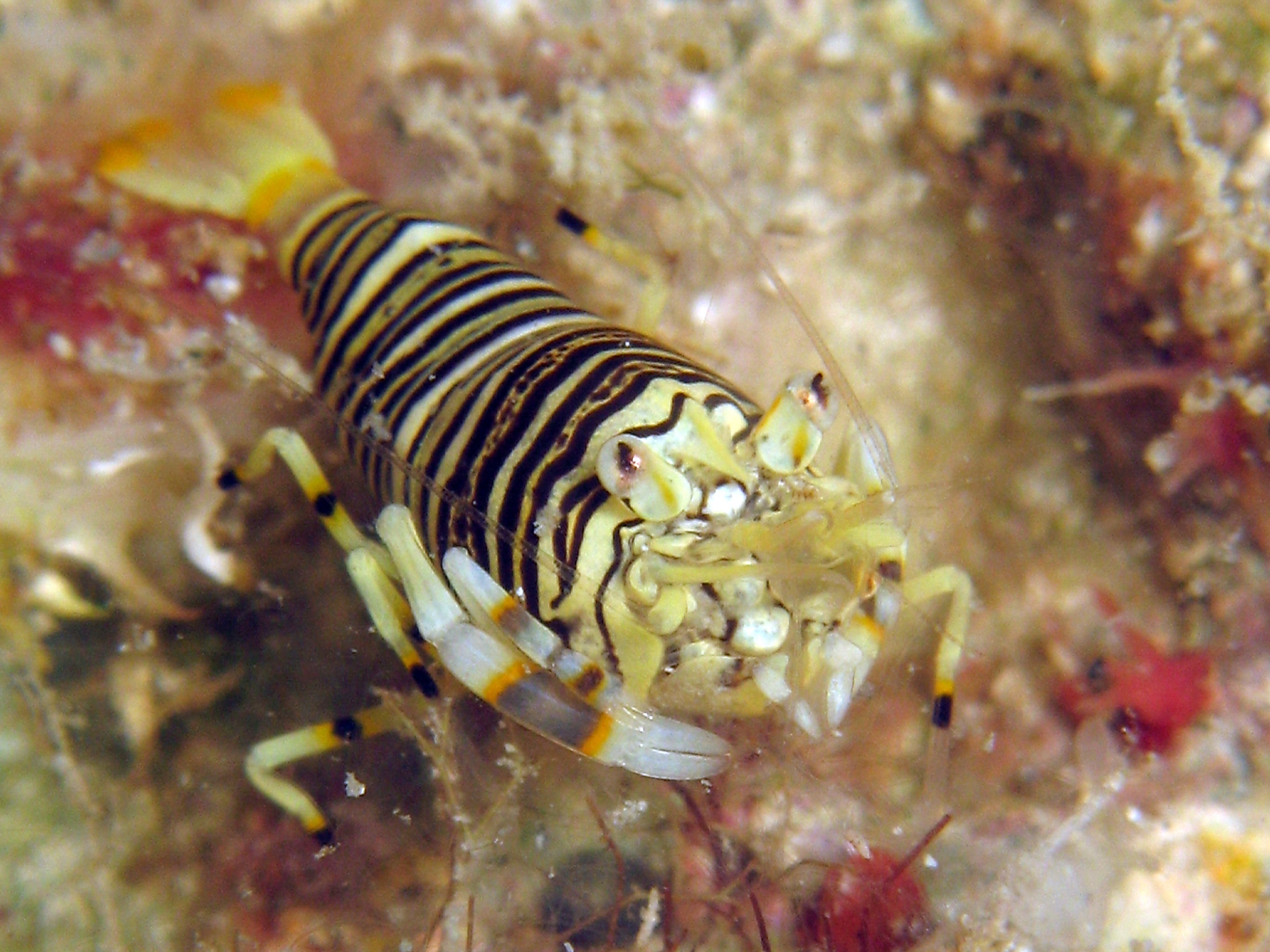

Scientific classification
- Domain: Eukaryota
- Kingdom: Animalia
- Phylum: Arthropoda
- Class: Malacostraca
- Order: Decapoda
- Suborder: Pleocyemata
- Infraorder: Caridea
- Family: Palaemonidae
- Genus: Gnathophyllum
- Species: G. americanum

Binomial name
- Gnathophyllum americanum Guérin-Méneville, 1855

= Gnathophyllum americanum =

Species of crustacean

Gnathophyllum americanum, commonly known as the striped bumblebee shrimp, is a species of shrimp that is common throughout tropical lagoons, bays, and reefs. Similar in coloration to a brightly coloured bumblebee, with blue highlights, the striped bumblebee shrimp can grow up to 1 inch (25 mm) in length.
