= Porsche 912 =

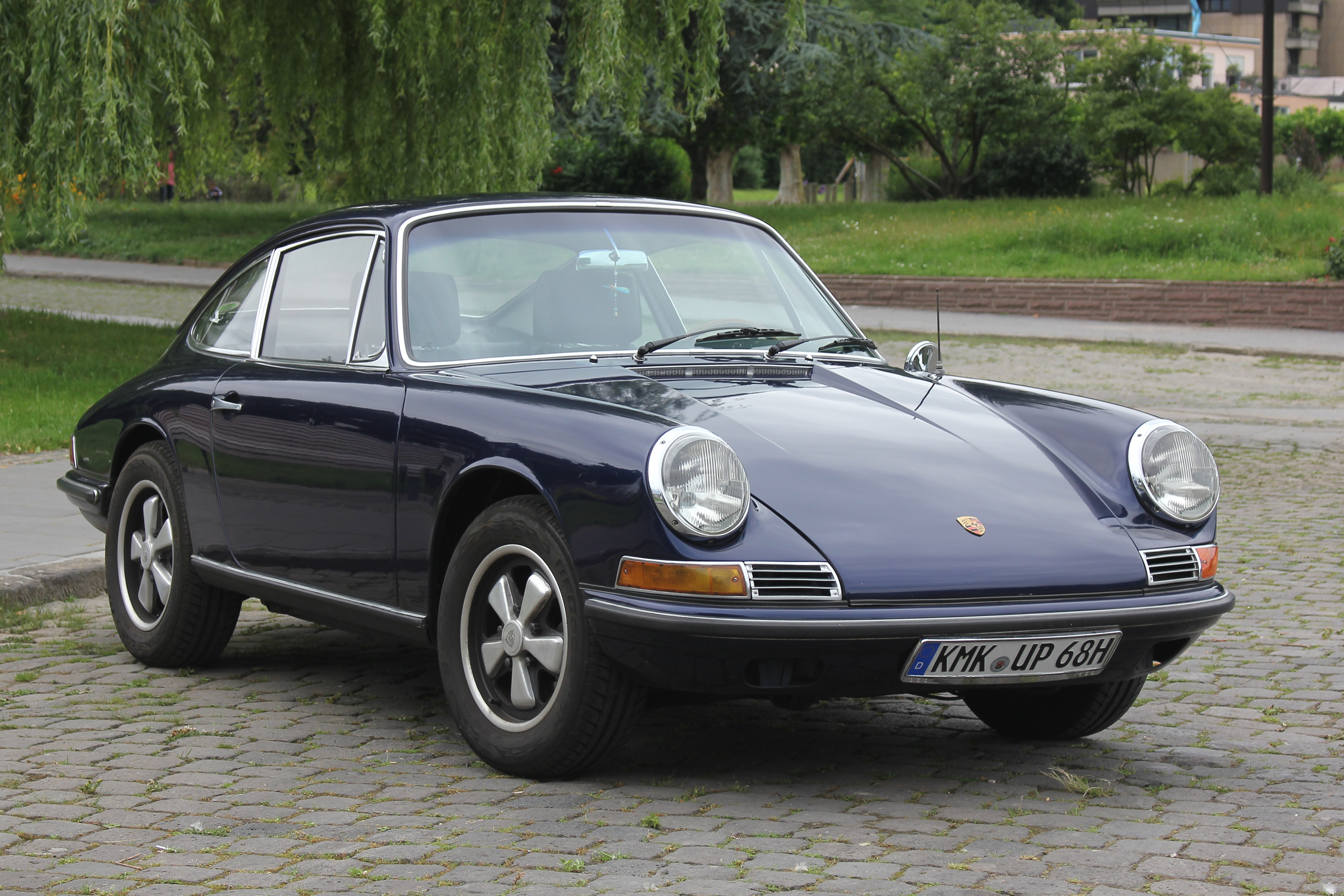
- Porsche 912 Coupé

Overview
- Manufacturer: Porsche
- Production: 1965–1969 (912); 1975–1976 (912E)
- Assembly: West Germany: Stuttgart, Zuffenhausen
- Designer: Ferdinand Alexander Porsche

Body and chassis
- Class: Sports car
- Body style: 2-door coupé
- Layout: RR layout
- Related: Porsche 911 (classic)

Powertrain
- Engine: 1.6 L Type 616/36 B4; 1.6 L Type 616/39 B4 (US); 2.0 L Volkswagen Type 4 H4 (912E)

Dimensions
- Wheelbase: 2,211 mm (87.0 in)
- Length: 4,135 mm (162.8 in)
- Width: 1,600 mm (63 in)
- Height: 1,320 mm (52 in)
- Curb weight: 965 kg (2,127 lb)

Chronology
- Predecessor: Porsche 356
- Successor: Porsche 914; Porsche 924

The Porsche 912 is a sports car produced by Porsche AG of Stuttgart, Germany, for the 1965 through 1969 model years. An entry-level variant of the 911, it was also offered in compact 2+2 Coupé and Targa body styles. The 912 was fitted with a 1.6-liter air cooled flat-4 from the last of the 356s, slightly detuned to 102 SAE horsepower at 5800 rpm, and with a slightly lower rear weight bias, was known for its nimble, balanced handling. The 912's high-efficiency boxer engine, low drag, and low weight allow it to get up to 30 miles per US gallon (7.8 L/100 km; 36 mpg_{‑imp}). Initially priced at US$4,700 (equivalent to $48,000 in 2025), more than 32,000 912s were built from April 1965 to July 1969. Sales of the 912 initially outpaced the 911 (introduced in 1964), boosting the manufacturer's total production until success of the 911 was assured.

The 4-cylinder 914 superseded the 912 for the 1970 through 1975 model years. In 1976, The 912 enjoyed a one-year revival with the U.S.-only 912E powered by the 914-derived 2.0-liter VW "Type 4" flat 4 with Bosch L-Jetronic fuel injection delivering 90 SAE horsepower at 4900 rpm. Just 2,092 912E Coupés were built from May 1975 to July 1976, when the 912E was superseded by the 924.

== History ==
=== 912 (1965–1969) ===
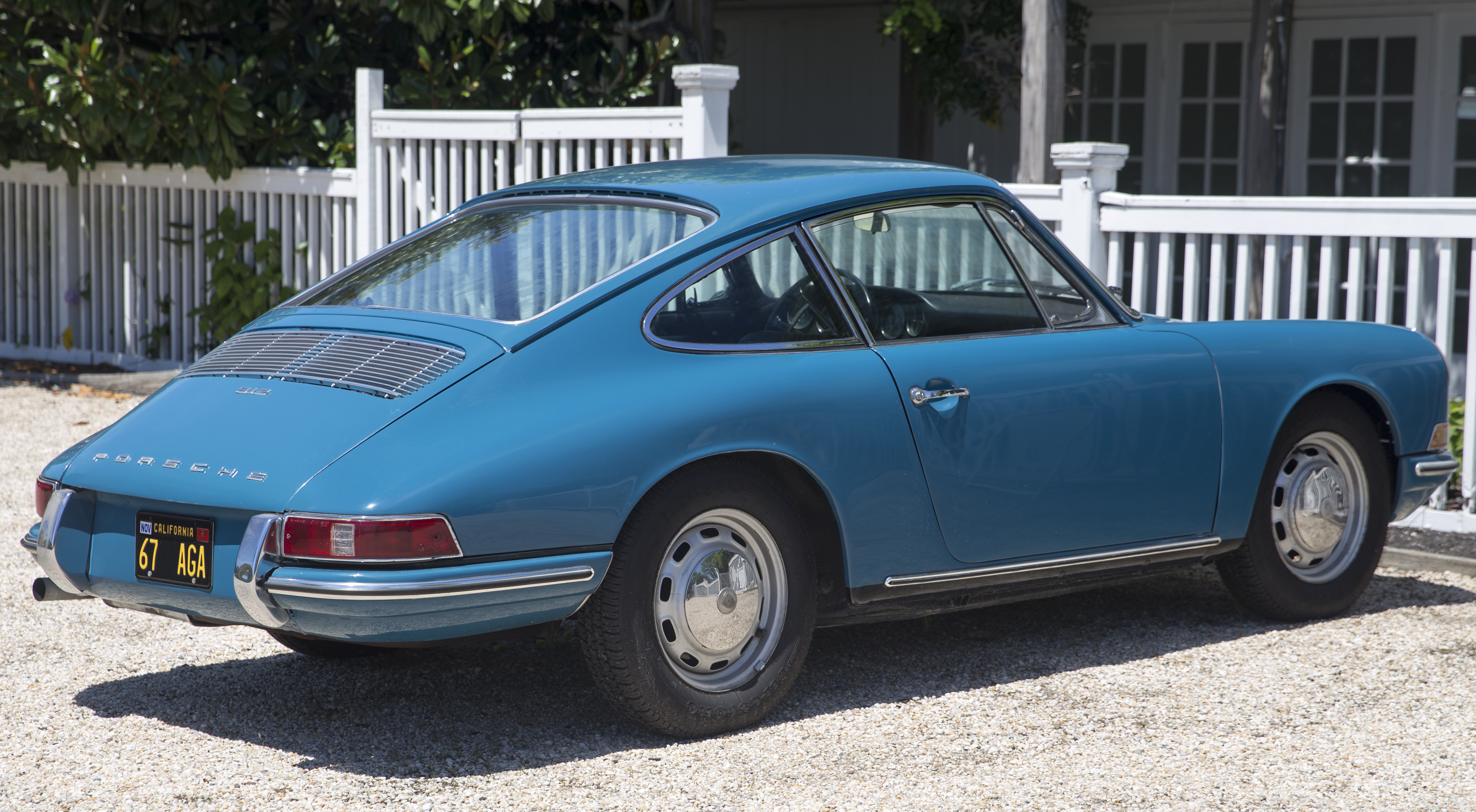
1967 Porsche 912 Coupé (rear)

In the early 1960s, Porsche planned to discontinue the Type 356, which would leave the newly introduced Type 911, with its more powerful six-cylinder powerplant, as the company's sole product. Concerned that the considerable price increase of the 911 over the 356 would cost the company sales and narrow its brand appeal, in 1963 Porsche executives decided to introduce a new four-cylinder entry-level model based on the 911. Like that vehicle with its internal factory designation of "901", the four-cylinder 912 was originally known at the company by a number with a zero in the middle, but the "902" designation was never used publicly. "912" as a project number was initially used to indicate the 12-cylinder boxer engine developed for Porsche 917 racing car.

In 1963, Porsche assigned Dan Schwartz, later Chief Departmental Manager for Development, Mechanics, a project to oversee design and construction of a new horizontally opposed four-cylinder engine for the 902, utilizing components from the new 901 six-cylinder engine, that would produce higher performance than the overhead valve 356SC engine while being less costly and complex than the overhead cam 356 Carrera 2 engine. Another option explored by Claus von Rücker was to increase displacement of the 356 Type 616 engine to 1.8-liters, add Kugelfischer fuel injection, and modify both valve and cooling systems. Considering performance, cost, and scheduling, Porsche discontinued both of these design projects, and instead developed a third option, to tailor the 1.6-liter Type 616 engine to the 902.

Before 911 production commenced in 1964, the Porsche Vehicle Research Department had set aside chassis numbers 13328, 13329, 13330, 13352, and 13386 through 13397 for research testing of the 902; research vehicle Serial Number 13394 is the oldest 902 known to exist today. In production form, the Type 912 combined a 911 chassis / bodyshell with the 1.6-liter, four-cylinder, push-rod Type 616/36 engine, based upon the Type 616/16 engine used in the Type 356SC of 1964–1965. With a lower compression ratio and new Solex carburetors, the Type 616/36 engine produced five less horsepower than the 616/16, but delivered about the same maximum torque at 3,500 rpm versus 4,200 rpm for the 616/16. Compared to the 911, the resulting production Type 912 vehicle demonstrated superior weight distribution, handling, and range. To bring 912 pricing close to the 356, Porsche also removed some features standard on the 911. As production of the 356 concluded in 1965, on April 5, 1965, Porsche officially began production of the 912 coupé. Styling, performance, quality construction, reliability, and price made the 912 a very attractive buy to both new and old customers, and it substantially outsold the 911 during the first few years of production. Porsche produced nearly 30,000 912 coupé units and about 2500 912 Targa body style units (Porsche's patented open-top variation) during a five-year manufacturing run.

Production of the Targa, complete with removable roof and heavy transparent plastic rear windows openable with a zipper (later called 'Version I' by Porsche and the 'soft-window Targa' by enthusiasts), commenced in December 1966 as a 1967 model. In January 1968, Porsche also made available a Targa 'Version II' option ('hard window Targa') with fixed glass rear window, transforming the Targa into a coupé with removable roof.

The 912 was also made in a special version for the German autobahn police (Polizei) and for the Dutch police (Rijkspolitie); the 100,000th Porsche car was a 912 Targa for the police of Baden-Württemberg, the home state of Porsche. In the April 1967 edition, the Porsche factory's Christophorus Magazine noted: "On 21 December 1966, Porsche celebrated a particularly proud anniversary. The 100,000th Porsche, a 912 Targa outfitted for the police, was delivered." Porsche executives decided that after the 1969 model year, continuation of 912 production would not be viable, due to both internal and external factors. First, production facilities used for the 912 were reallocated to a new 914–6, a six-cylinder high performance version of the Porsche 914, Porsche-Volkswagen joint effort vehicle. Second, the 911 platform had returned to Porsche's traditional three performance-level ladder, including a base model 911T, a fuel-injected 911E, and a most powerful 911S, with pricing largely in line with market expectations. Third, more stringent United States engine emission control regulations also had a bearing on the decision; Ferry Porsche stated "It would have taken some trouble to prepare the 912 for the new exhaust rules, and with the arrival of the 914 we would have had three different engines to keep current. That was too many."

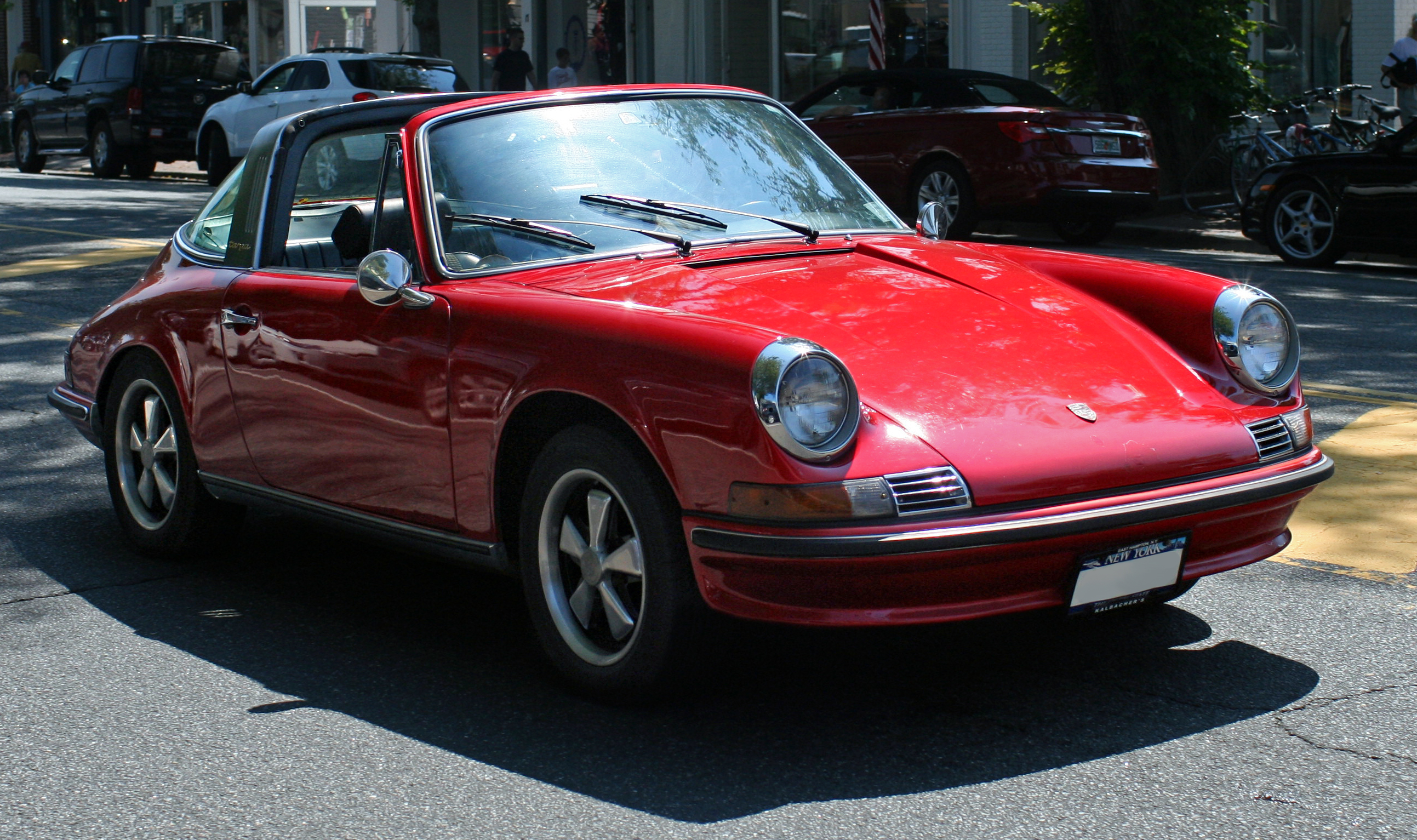
Porsche 912 Targa

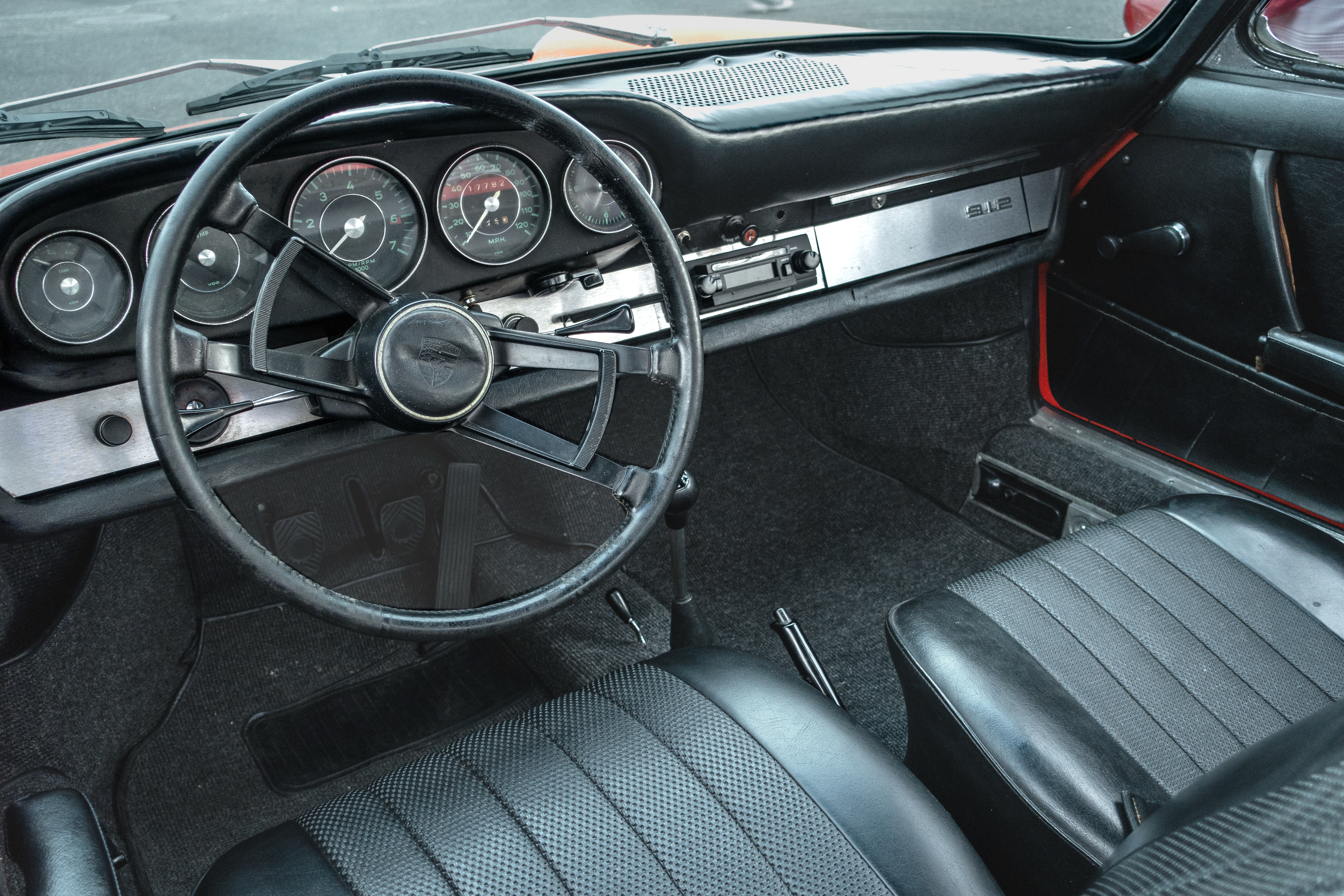
Interior

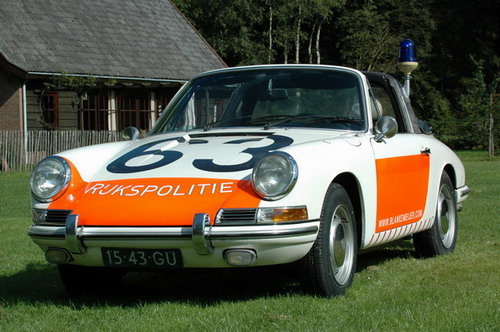
Dutch Porsche 912 Police Targa

=== 912E (1975–1976) ===
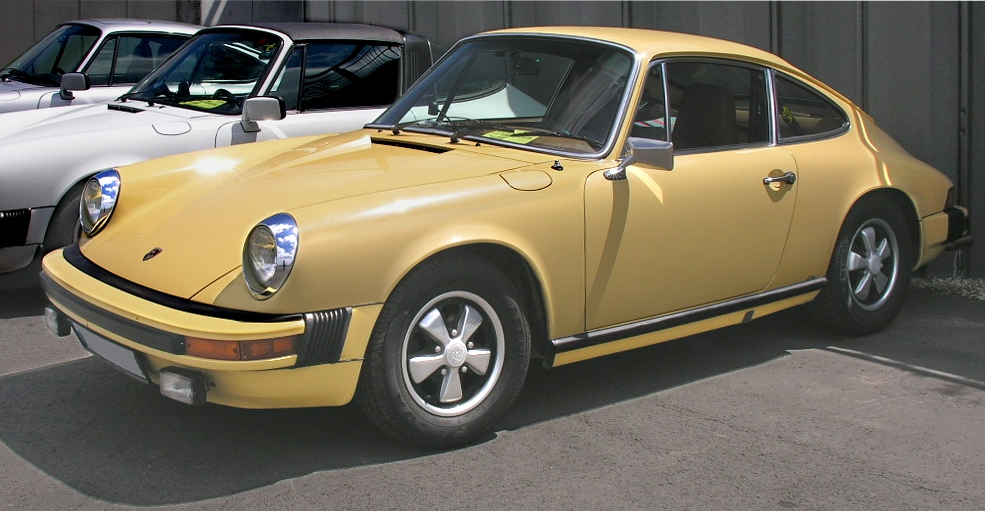
1976 Porsche 912E Coupé

After a six-year absence, the 912 was re-introduced to North America for the 1976 model year as the 912E (internal factory designation 923) to fill the entry-level position left vacant by the discontinuation of the 914, while the new 924 – another Porsche-Volkswagen joint effort vehicle and the 914's official replacement – was being finalized and put into production. During the production run of May 1975 to July 1976, Porsche manufactured 2,099 of the 912E (E=Einspritzung), targeted only to the US market. By comparison, 10,677 (4,784 US) 911's were built for the 1976 model year. At $10,845 MSRP, the 912E was $3,000 less than the 911S.

The VW "Type 4" engine was originally made for the 1.7 liter VW 411/412. The 912E uses a Porsche-designed 2.0 liter revision of the engine with a longer 71mm stroke crankshaft, new rod bearings and new pistons to increase the cylinder bore to 94mm. Power output was 90 SAE horsepower. The 912E's Bosch L-Jetronic / Air Flow Controlled system was later adapted for the 911. The 912E has a 20+ gallon fuel tank, 30 mpg and 600-mile range.

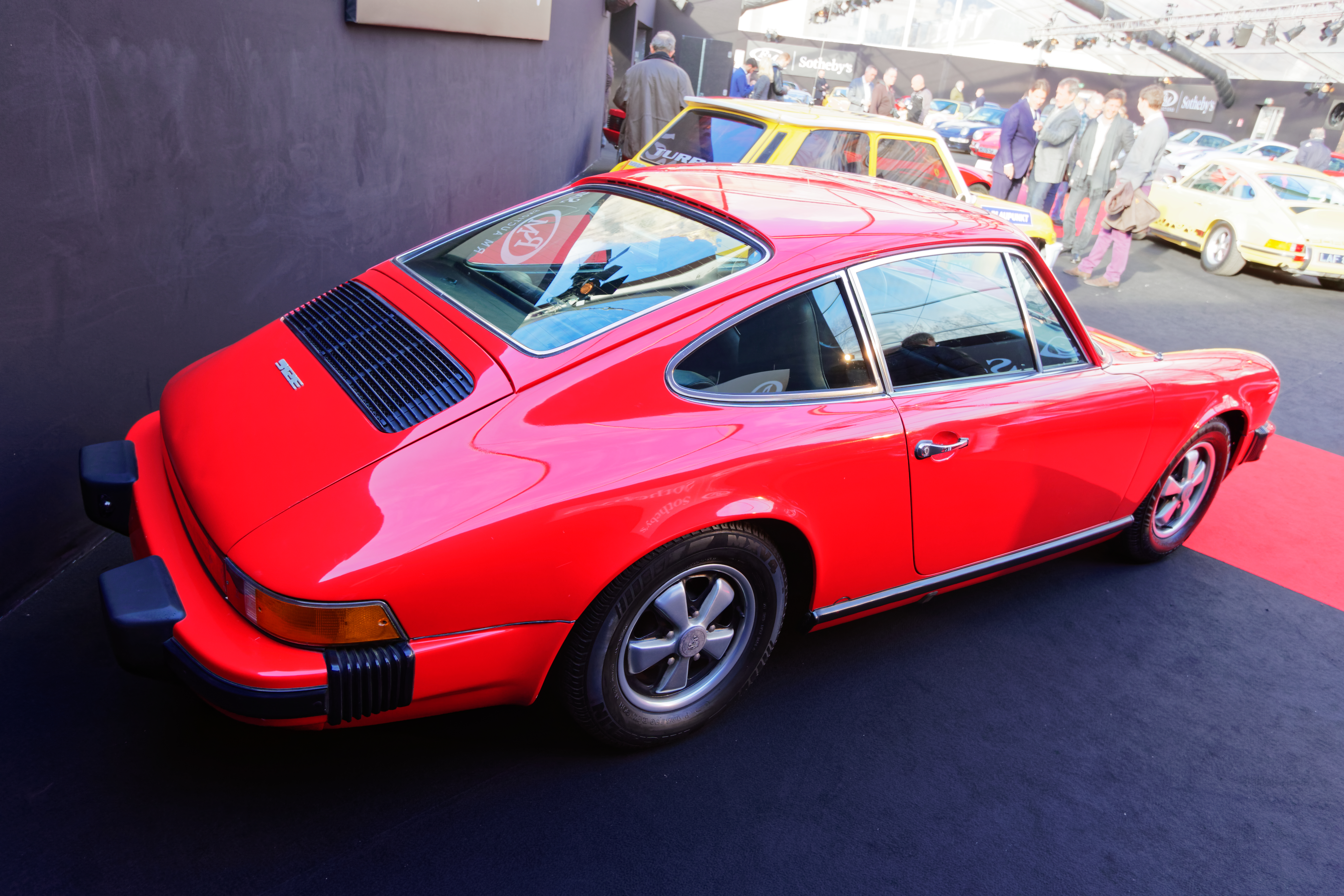
1976 Porsche 912E Coupé

The 912E has the same chassis as the 911 and therefore handles much like the 911. But with less power and less weight behind the rear axle, the 912E is more forgiving and less prone to sudden oversteer than the 911 because it fitted thinner tyres. The E was the only 912 offered with a corrosion-resistant galvanized chassis, and is the most comfortable version of the 912. The interior is the same as the 911, though some pieces were extra cost options including two of the five gauges. 14-inch Fuchs alloy wheels was a popular option; "Cookie-Cutter" alloy wheels were also available (it was rare to see a 912E with the standard 15-inch steel wheels). Other options were electric sunroof, 923/02 anti-slip differential, electric antenna (located on the passenger side front fender), power door mirrors, power windows, headlight washers, H1 headlamps. Air conditioning was a popular dealer-installed option. As a stopgap, the 912E was the single instance of "planned obsolescence" in Porsche history. With only 2,092 built, its one year-only model run, and the desirable qualities inherited from contemporary 911s, the 912E is one of the more collectible four-cylinder Porsches.

Based on 912 Registry member Aric Gless's research, over half of the 2,092 cars are still in use. The Prototyp Museum collection in Hamburg Germany includes a 912E pre-series vehicle constructed utilizing a 911 Chassis No. 911 520 1617 and four-cylinder VW-Porsche 90HP 2.0L Type 4 similar to the late-model 2.0L 914/4.

Road & Track said, “The 912E will obviously find favor with those who prefer a slightly more practical and tractable Porsche. It’s a car with almost all the sporting virtues of the more expensive 911S, yet its simpler pushrod 4-cyl. engine should make for better fuel economy and less expensive maintenance than the 911’s six” "The fittings are simpler in this model although in terms of materials, trim and finishing the 912E is of high Porsche quality. "The 912E is comfortable where the Carrera is harsh, rational where the Carrera is excessive.” R&T's 11.3-second 0-60 mph time and 115-mph top speed looked good against the observed 23.0-mpg economy."

== Motorsport ==
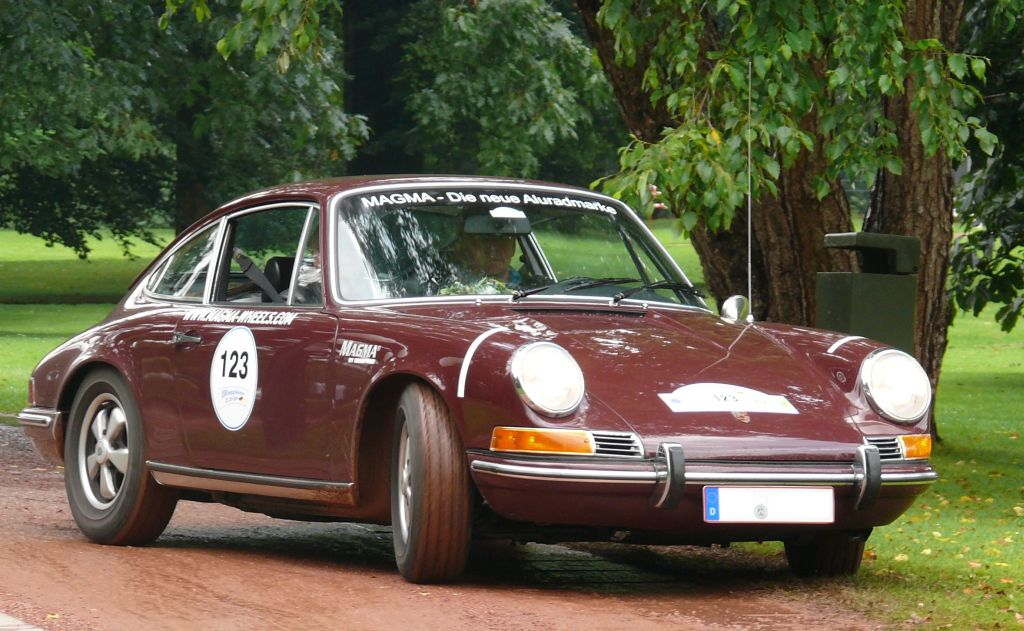
Porsche 912 Coupé B

Sold to the public for street use, the Porsche 912 has also proven successful as a race car, from production years to current vintage events. In 1967 the 912 contributed to Porsche factory rally history when independent Polish driver Sobiesław Zasada drove a factory-loaned 912, bearing Polish plate 6177 KR, to capture the European Rally Championship for Group 1 series touring cars. In the 1967 Rally of Poland, the third oldest rally in the world and one of the oldest motorsport events in the world, Zasada drove his 912 race No. 47 to finish first overall out of a starting field of 50 entries.

As a vintage rally car, on January 29, 2012, Hayden Burvill, Alastair Caldwell, and their #35 1968 Porsche 912 finished first in class, and 7th overall in the 2012 London to Cape Town World Cup Rally; a 14 country, three continent, 14,000 kilometre, 26 driving-days event.
