= Porsche 914 =

Mid-engine sports car (1969–1976)

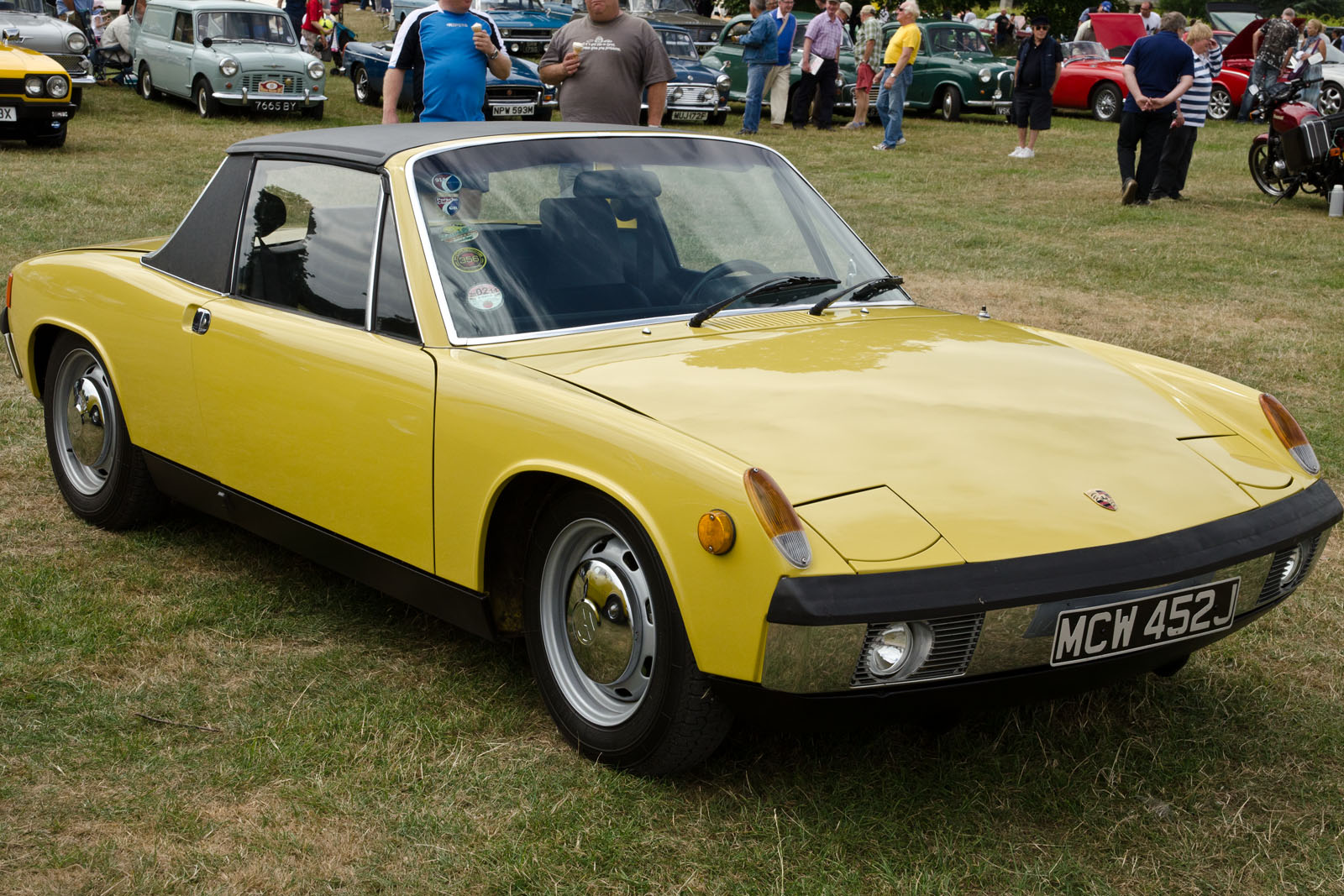
- 1970 Porsche 914

Overview
- Manufacturer: Porsche (Type 914/6); Karmann (Type 914/4)
- Also called: VW-Porsche 914
- Production: 1969–1976; 118,978 produced; 914/4: 115,646; 914/6: 3,332; 914/8: 2
- Assembly: West Germany: Stuttgart, Zuffenhausen; West Germany: Osnabrück (VW-Porsche)
- Designer: Ferdinand Alexander Porsche, Heinrich Klie

Body and chassis
- Class: Sports car
- Body style: 2-door targa
- Layout: Rear mid-engine, rear-wheel drive
- Related: Porsche 914-6 GT; Porsche Tapiro

Powertrain
- Engine: 1.7 L Volkswagen Type 4 F4; 1.8 L Volkswagen Type 4 F4; 2.0 L Volkswagen Type 4 F4; 2.0 L Type 901/36 F6 (914/6)
- Transmission: 5-speed manual; 4-speed semi-automatic transmission (Sportomatic)

Dimensions
- Wheelbase: 2,450 mm (96.5 in)
- Length: 3,985 mm (156.9 in)
- Width: 1,650 mm (65.0 in)
- Curb weight: 940–995 kg (2,072–2,194 lb)

Chronology
- Predecessor: Porsche 912; Volkswagen Type 34 Karmann Ghia
- Successor: Porsche 924

The Porsche 914 or VW-Porsche 914 is a mid-engined sports car designed, manufactured and marketed collaboratively by Volkswagen and Porsche from 1969 to 1976. Available as a targa-topped two-seat roadster, across a single generation, the 914 was powered by either a flat-4 or flat-six engine.

== History ==
=== Pre-development ===
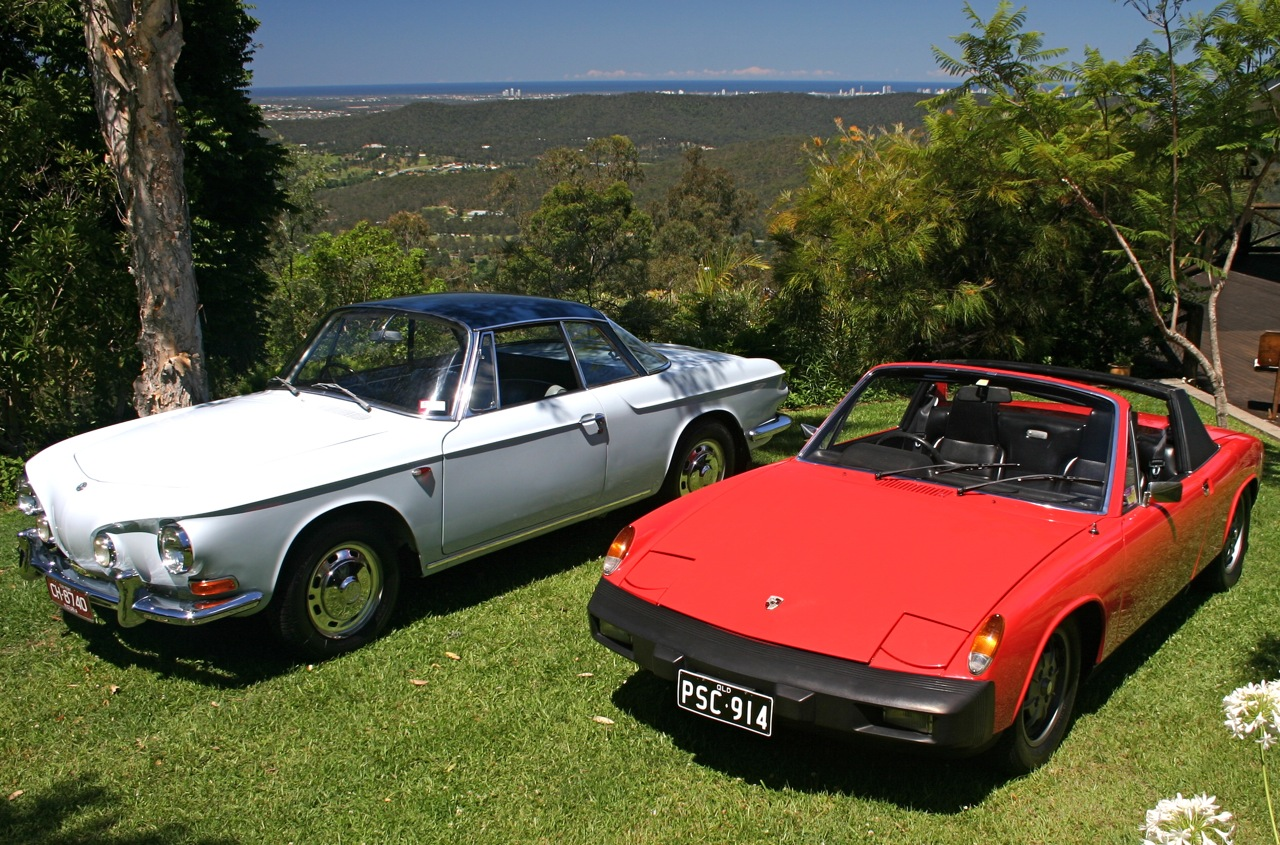
Porsche 914 at right and the car it replaced at the top of VW's line, the Type 34 Karmann Ghia, at left

By the late 1960s, both Volkswagen and Porsche were in need of new models; Porsche was looking for a replacement for their entry-level 912, and Volkswagen wanted a new range-topping sports coupé to replace the Volkswagen Type 34 Karmann Ghia coupé. At the time the majority of Volkswagen's development work was handled by Porsche as part of an agreement that dated back to Porsche's founding. Volkswagen needed to contract out one last project to Porsche to fulfill the contract, and decided to make the 914 that project. Ferdinand Piëch, who was in charge of research and development at Porsche, was put in charge of the 914 project.

In 1966 and 1967, German company Gugelot Design GmbH began showing a proposed design for a sports coupe built with technology developed in partnership with Bayer to several major car builders, including Volkswagen and Porsche. Some sources have suggested that the Gugelot proposal, suitably adapted, was the origin of the design of the 914. The rationale is that an outside design would be able to please both Volkswagen and Porsche without appearing too similar to either of the partners' existing products. Later sources have rejected this idea. While acknowledging that Porsche was aware of the Gugelot design, they assert that the 914 design was done in-house at Porsche, and is primarily the work of body engineer Heinrich Klie.

=== Joint venture ===
Originally intending to sell the vehicle with a flat four-cylinder engine as a Volkswagen and with a flat six-cylinder engine as a Porsche, Porsche decided during development that having Volkswagen and Porsche models sharing the same body would be risky for business in the American market, and convinced Volkswagen to allow them to sell both versions as Porsches in North America.

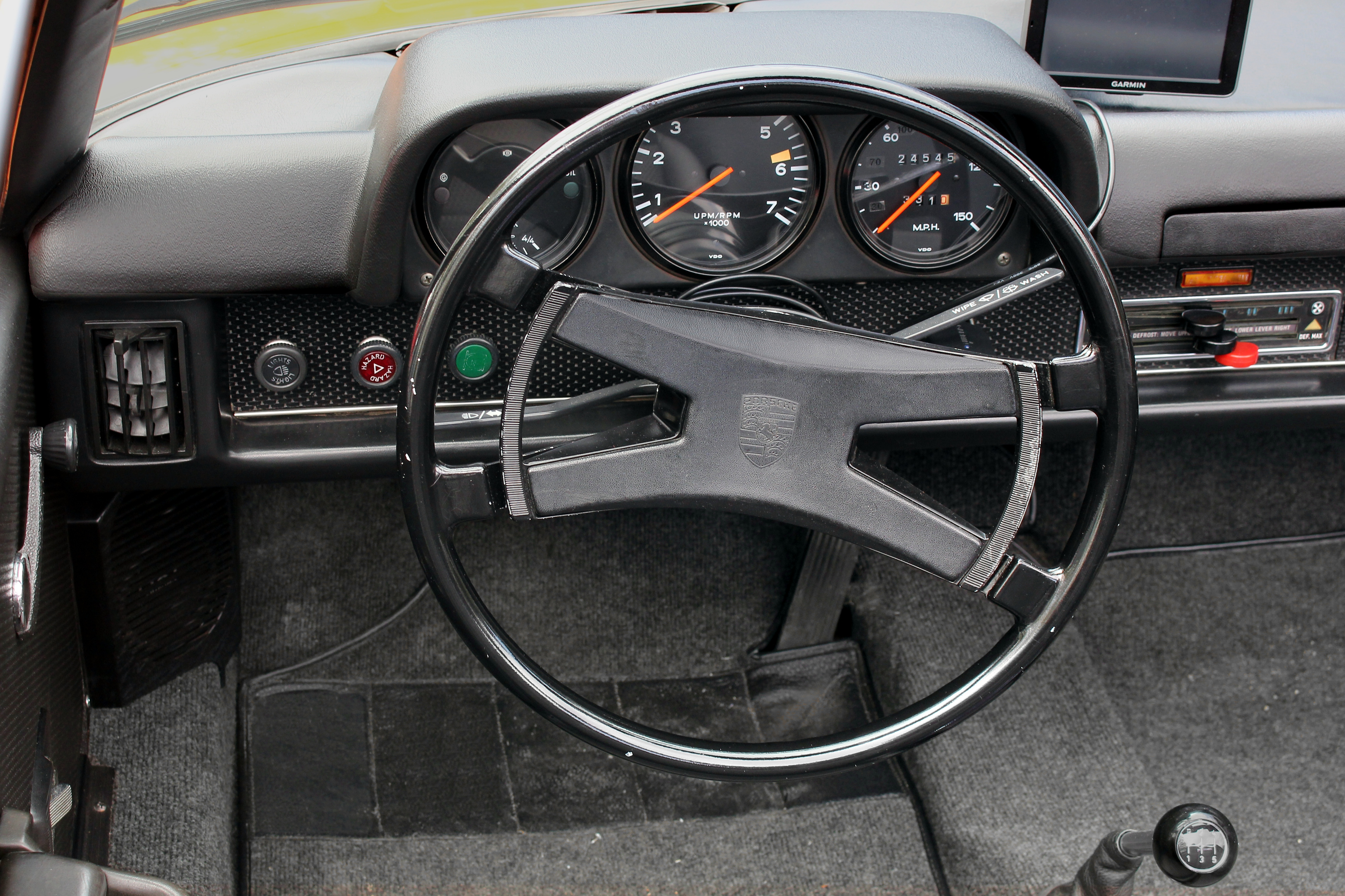
Porsche 914 dashboard

On March 1, 1968, the first 914 prototype was presented. However, development became complicated after the death of Volkswagen's chairman, Heinrich Nordhoff, on April 12, 1968. His successor, Kurt Lotz, was not connected with the Porsche dynasty and the verbal agreement between Volkswagen and Porsche fell apart.

In Lotz's opinion, Volkswagen had all rights to the model, and no incentive to share it with Porsche if they would not share in tooling expenses. With this decision, the price and marketing concept for the 914 had failed before series production had begun. As a result, the price of the chassis went up considerably, and the 914/6 ended up costing only a bit less than the 911T, Porsche's next lowest priced car.

The 914 was Motor Trend's Import Car of the Year for 1970.

Slow sales and rising costs prompted Porsche to discontinue the 914/6 variant in 1972 after producing 3,351 of them.

Production of the 914 ended in 1976. The 2.0 L flat-4 engine continued to be used in the 912E, introduced that year as an entry-level model until the front-engined four-cylinder 924 was introduced the following model year.

The 914/4 became Porsche's top seller during its model run, outselling the Porsche 911 by a wide margin with over 118,000 units sold worldwide.

== Features ==
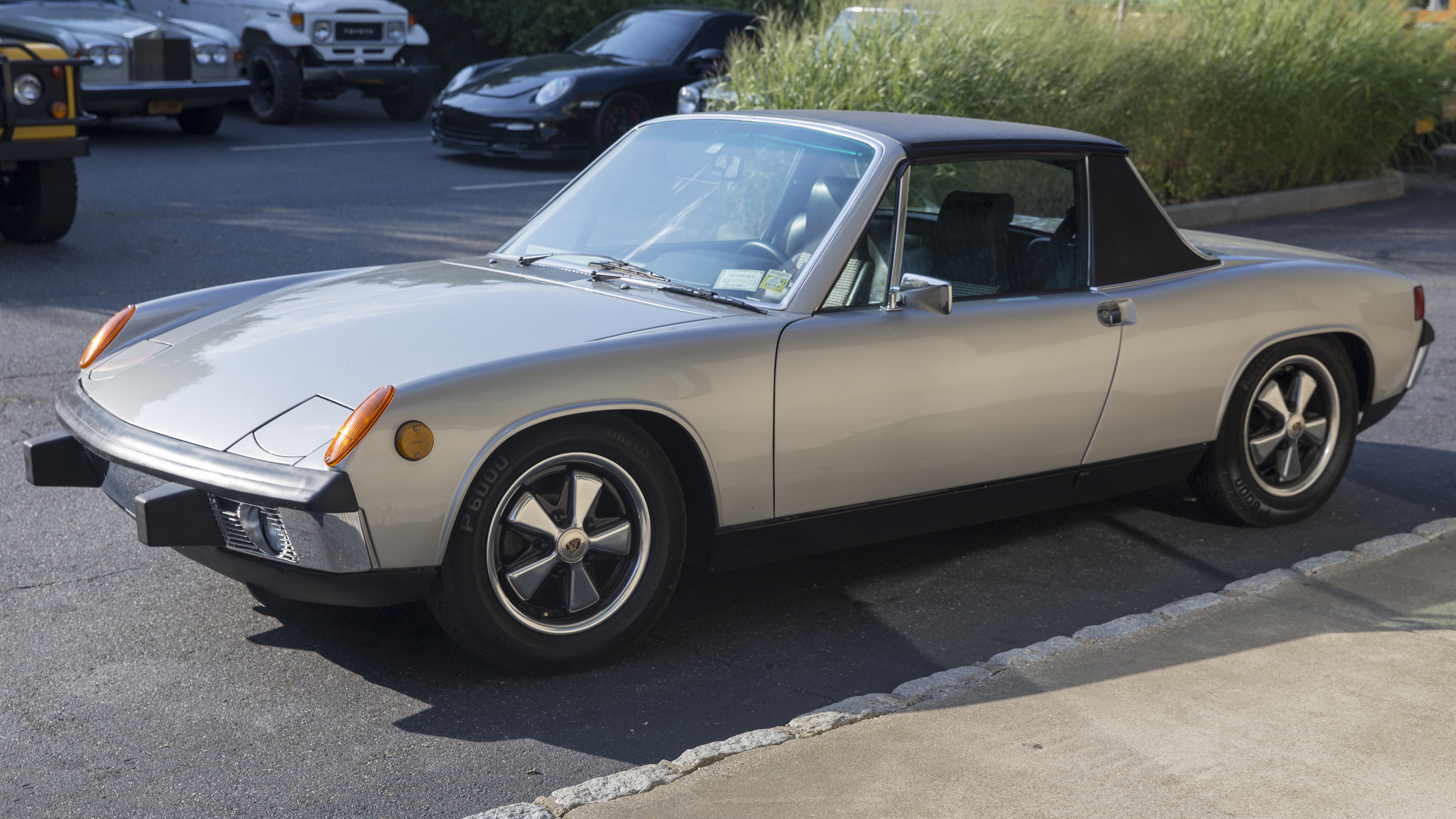
1973 Porsche 914 1.7 (US)

Volkswagen versions originally featured the fuel-injected 1.7 L VW Type 4 flat-four engine producing 80 bhp (60 kW; 81 PS).

Porsche's 914/6 variant featured the 2.0 L air-cooled Type 901/3 flat-six engine from the 1967–1969 911T model. This was the least powerful flat-six in Porsche's lineup. This engine had revised pistons that reduced the compression ratio to 8.6:1. The cylinder barrels were entirely made of iron, in contrast to the iron and aluminum "Biral" barrels in the engines in the 911S and 911L. New camshafts had less lift, and relaxed timing characteristics. The venturis in the Weber 40IDT3C carburetors were 27 mm (1.1 in), smaller than the other 911 engines, and the exhaust pipe diameter was also reduced in size. Power output was 110 bhp (82 kW; 112 PS). When the 911T got a 2.2 L engine in 1970, the engine in the 914/6 remained at 2.0 L.

All engines were placed amidships in front of a version of the 1969 911's "901" gearbox configured for a mid-engined sports car. Karmann manufactured the rolling chassis at their plant, completing Volkswagen production in-house or delivering versions to Porsche for their final assembly.

The 914/6 models featured both a higher power output and higher curb weight than the 4-cylinder models. They came with lower gear ratios, larger brakes, five-lug wheels and an ignition on the left side of the steering wheel. Suspension and handling were otherwise mostly the same. A Volkswagen-Porsche joint venture, Volkswagen of America, handled export to the U.S., where both versions were badged and sold as Porsches. The four-cylinder cars were sold as Volkswagen-Porsches at European Volkswagen dealerships.

For 1973, the discontinued 914/6 was replaced in the lineup by a variant powered by a new 100 bhp (75 kW; 101 PS) 2.0 L, fuel-injected version of Volkswagen's Type 4 engine.

For 1974, the 1.7 L engine was replaced by an 85 bhp (63 kW; 86 PS) 1.8 L, and the new Bosch L-Jetronic fuel injection system was added to American units to help with emissions control.

=== Model year changes ===
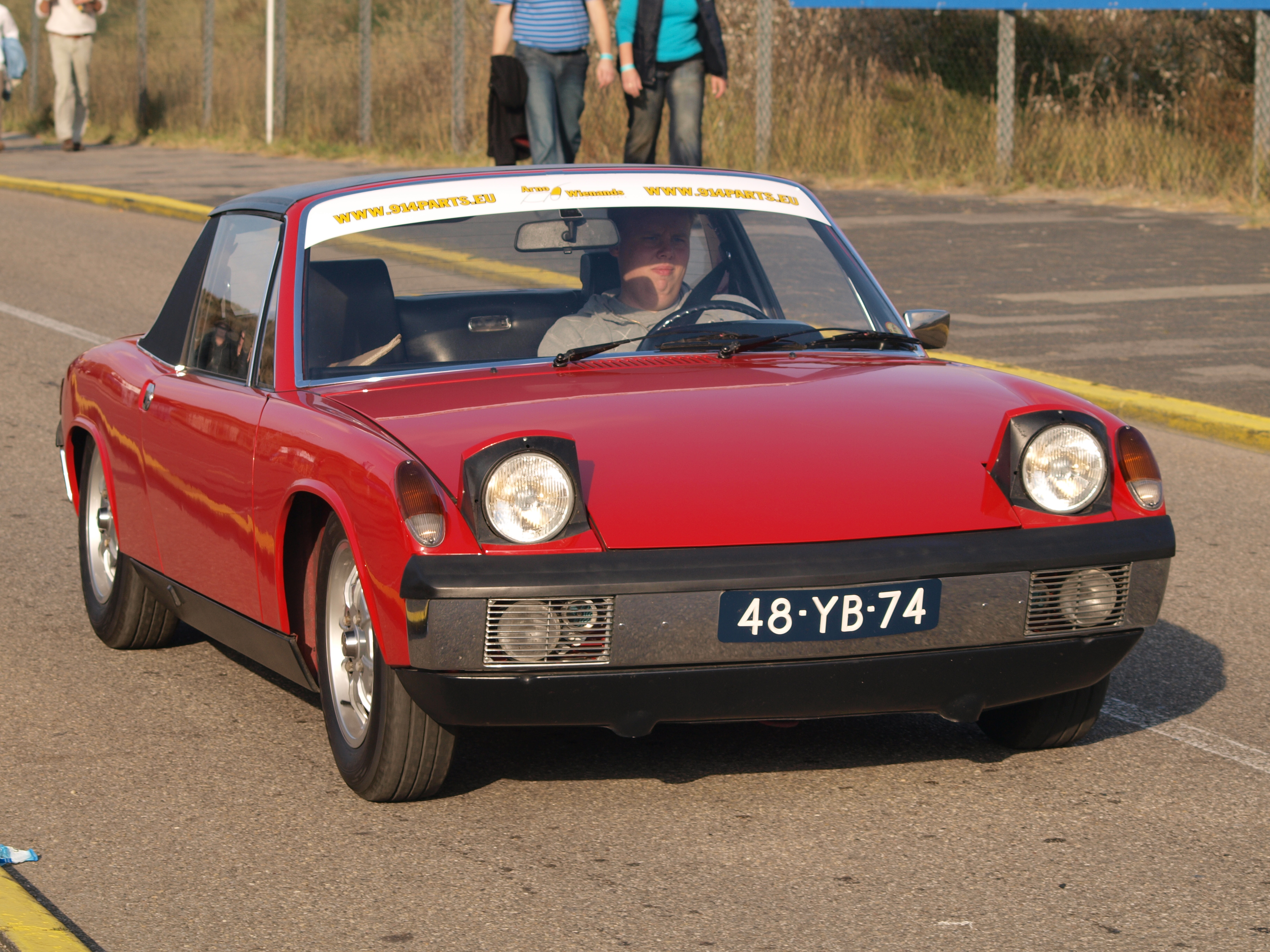
A 914 1.8 with its headlights raised

Over the seven model years, Porsche made a number of changes to the 914. Some of these changes were cosmetic and others were in response to changing crash protection standards. From 1970 to 1972, the 914 was offered with chrome or painted bumpers. In early 1970, rear bumpers were produced with a straight crease on either side of the license plate indent. Between 1970 and 1972, both front and rear bumpers were smooth without bumper guards. In 1973, bumper guards were added to the front of the car. In 1974, guards were also added to the rear bumper. In 1975 and 1976, the chrome or painted bumpers were replaced with heavy, rubber-covered units which actually made the cars more stable at high speeds.

The headlight surrounds were white from the first 914s to mid-production of 1973 and subsequently black. Cars produced up to early 1972 had a fixed passenger seat and a removable passenger footrest. Later cars featured a movable passenger seat. Other interior differences included changing vinyl designs, gauge appearance, and air vent configurations in the dash.

The most significant performance upgrade during the vehicle's lifespan was the introduction of anti-roll bars, significantly improving the handling, and a change from the "tail shifter" to the "side shifter" gearbox for 1973 to 1976, improving the otherwise vague long linkage.

== Technical summaries ==
=== Technical specifications of the standard versions ===
The Porsche 914 was produced from 1969 to 1976 in the following models:

	914/4 1.7 S (Targa)	914/6 SC (Targa)	914 1.8 Base (Targa)	914 2.0 SC (Targa)
Engine	Flat, four-cylinder boxer engine	Flat, six-cylinder Type 901/3 boxer engine	Flat, four-cylinder boxer engine	Flat, four-cylinder boxer engine
Induction	Bosch D-Jetronic Fuel injection	Two 3-barrel 40 mm Weber Carburetors	Bosch L-Jetronic Fuel injection (European-spec Dual Carburettor)	Bosch D-Jetronic Fuel injection
Displacement	1,679 cc (102.5 cu in)	1,991 cc (121.5 cu in)	1,795 cc (109.5 cu in)	1,970 cc (120.2 cu in)
Bore x stroke	90 mm × 66 mm (3.5 in × 2.6 in)	80 mm × 66 mm (3.1 in × 2.6 in)	93 mm × 66 mm (3.7 in × 2.6 in)	94 mm × 71 mm (3.7 in × 2.8 in)
Maximum power	59 kW (80 PS; 79 hp) at 4900 rpm	81 kW (110 PS; 109 hp) at 5800 rpm	63 kW (86 PS; 84 hp)	74 kW (101 PS; 99 hp) at 5000 rpm
Maximum torque	136 N⋅m (100 lb⋅ft) at 2700 rpm	160 N⋅m (118 lbf⋅ft) at 4200 rpm	138 N⋅m (102 lb⋅ft) at 3400 rpm	160 N⋅m (118 lbf⋅ft) at 3500 rpm
Compression ratio	8.2:1	8.6:1	7.3:1 (European-spec 8.6:1)	7.6:1 (European-spec 8.0:1)
Valvetrain	Single cam-in-block. 2 overhead valves per cylinder.	Single overhead camshaft (one per cylinder head). 2 overhead valves per cylinder.	Single cam-in-block. 2 overhead valves per cylinder.	
Cooling	Air cooling (fan)			
Transmission	5-speed manual transmission	5-speed manual transmission 4-speed semi-automatic transmission (Sportomatic)	5-speed manual transmission	
Front suspension	MacPherson struts and lower A-arms. Longitudinal torsion bars.			
Rear suspension	Semi-trailing arms. Coil springs over tubular shock absorbers.			
Body/chassis	Steel unibody			
Track width (front/rear)	1,337 / 1,374 mm (52.6 / 54.1 in)	1,361 / 1,382 mm (53.6 / 54.4 in)		
Wheelbase	2,450 mm (96.5 in)			
Brakes Front/rear	255 mm (10.05 in) disc / 282 mm (11.10 in) disc	11.12 in (282 mm) vented disc / 11.25 in (286 mm) disc		
Tires	155 SR 15	165 HR 15 or 185 HR 14	165 SR 15	165 HR 15
Dimensions (L x W x H)	3,985 mm × 1,650 mm × 1,220 mm (156.9 in × 65.0 in × 48.0 in)	3,985 mm × 1,650 mm × 1,220 mm (156.9 in × 65.0 in × 48.0 in)	3,985 mm × 1,650 mm × 1,230 mm (156.9 in × 65.0 in × 48.4 in)	
Curb weight	940 kg (2,072 lb) (Note: Measurement of Auto Motor und Sport (reviews in issue 22/1969 8/1970))	985 kg (2,172 lb)	950 kg (2,094 lb)	
Maximum speed	186.5 km/h (115.9 mph)	207 km/h (129 mph)	178 km/h (111 mph)	190 km/h (118 mph)
Acceleration 0–100 km/h (0–62 mph)	13.3 s	8.7 s	12.0 s	10.5 s

=== 914 road car timeline ===
Porsche 914 model/power production timeline: 1968 to 1977
Model	Power	1960s	1970s
8	9	0	1	2	3	4	5	6	7
914/4	59 kW (80 PS; 79 hp)
914/6	81 kW (110 PS; 109 hp)
914 1.7	59 kW (80 PS; 79 hp)
914 1.8	56 kW (76 PS; 75 hp) (US); 63 kW (86 PS; 84 hp) (RoW)
914 2.0	70 kW (95 PS; 94 hp) (US); 74 kW (101 PS; 99 hp) (RoW)
914 2.0 (US only)	65 kW (88 PS; 87 hp)

=== Chassis numbers ===
Porsche 914 chassis numbers from 1970 to 1976
Year	914/4	914/6	916
1970	4702900001 – 4702913312	9140430001 – 9140432668
1971	4712900001 – 4712916231	9141430001 – 9141430443	9141430195
1972	4722900001 – 4722921580	9142430001 – 9142430260	9142330011 – 9142330020
1973	4732900001 – 4732927660
1974	4742900001 – 4742921370
1975	4752900001 – 4752911368
1976	4762900001 – 4762904100

== Concept cars, prototypes, and factory specials ==
=== Porsche 914/6 GT, 914/6 R ===
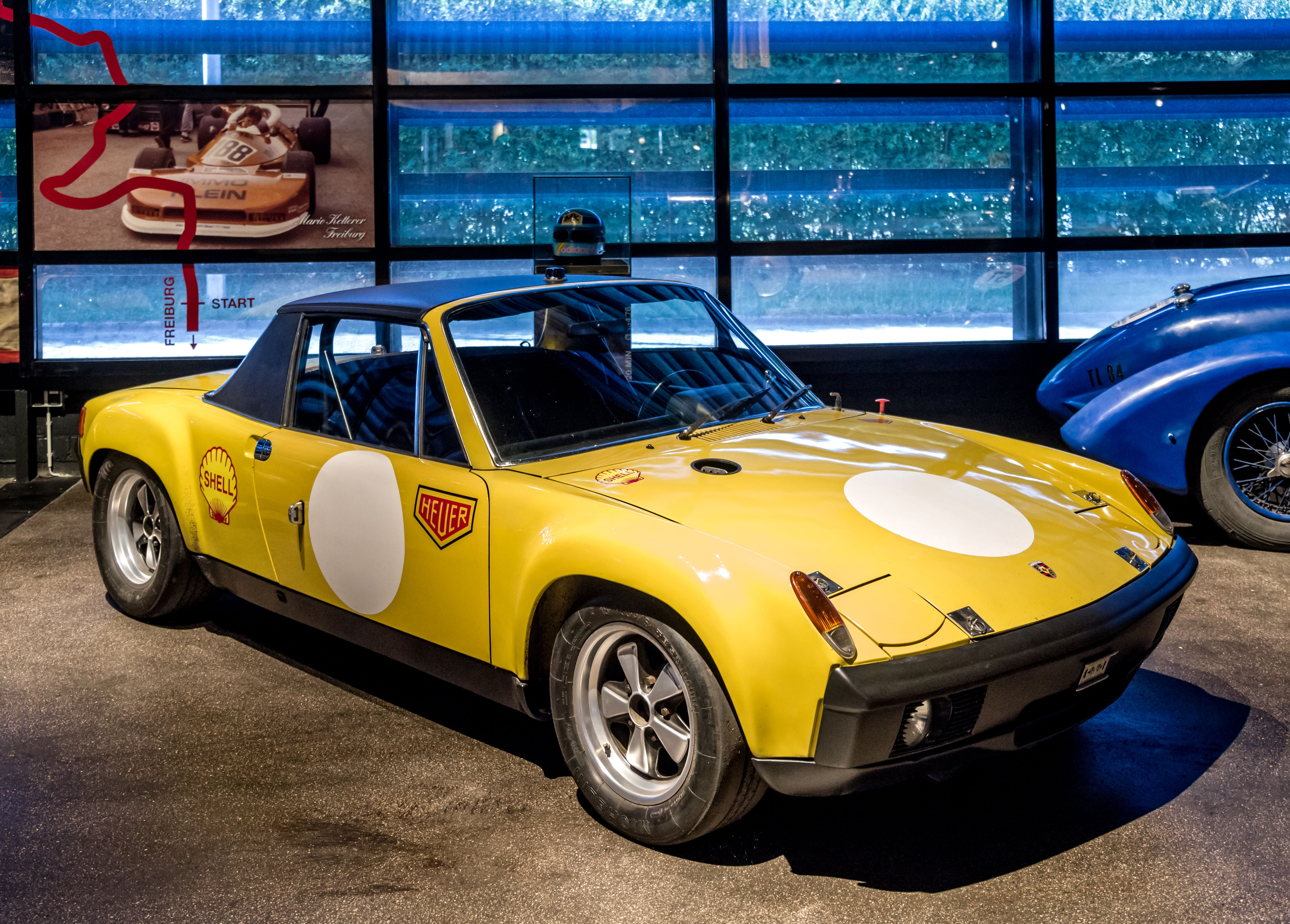
Porsche 914/6 GT

On 1 March 1970 the 914/6 was homologated by the Fédération Internationale de l'Automobile (FIA) for Group 4, Special Grand Touring cars. That same month two cars were sent to the Targa Florio for testing, not as competitors. These were the first two 914/6 GT cars built. Externally the cars were distinguished by squared fender flares that were the full 2 in (51 mm) depth permitted by FIA rules. The chassis was reinforced with three welded plates on each side. For rally applications, a stone guard protected the power-train and a stone shield did the same for the front of the car.

The GT cars received stronger lower front A-arms, and anti-roll bars were fitted front and rear. Ground clearance was reduced to 4 in (102 mm). Brakes front and rear were upgraded to the same components used on the racing 911S model.

Fiberglass panels for the front and rear bumpers, front and rear deck lids, and left and right rocker panels replaced the original steel parts. The rear air intake grille was doubled in size. An inlet in the front bumper admitted air to a new supplementary oil cooler in the nose. The car's nose compartment was nearly filled by a 100 L (26.4 US gal) fuel tank. The car weighed 1,980 lb (898.1 kg) ready to race.

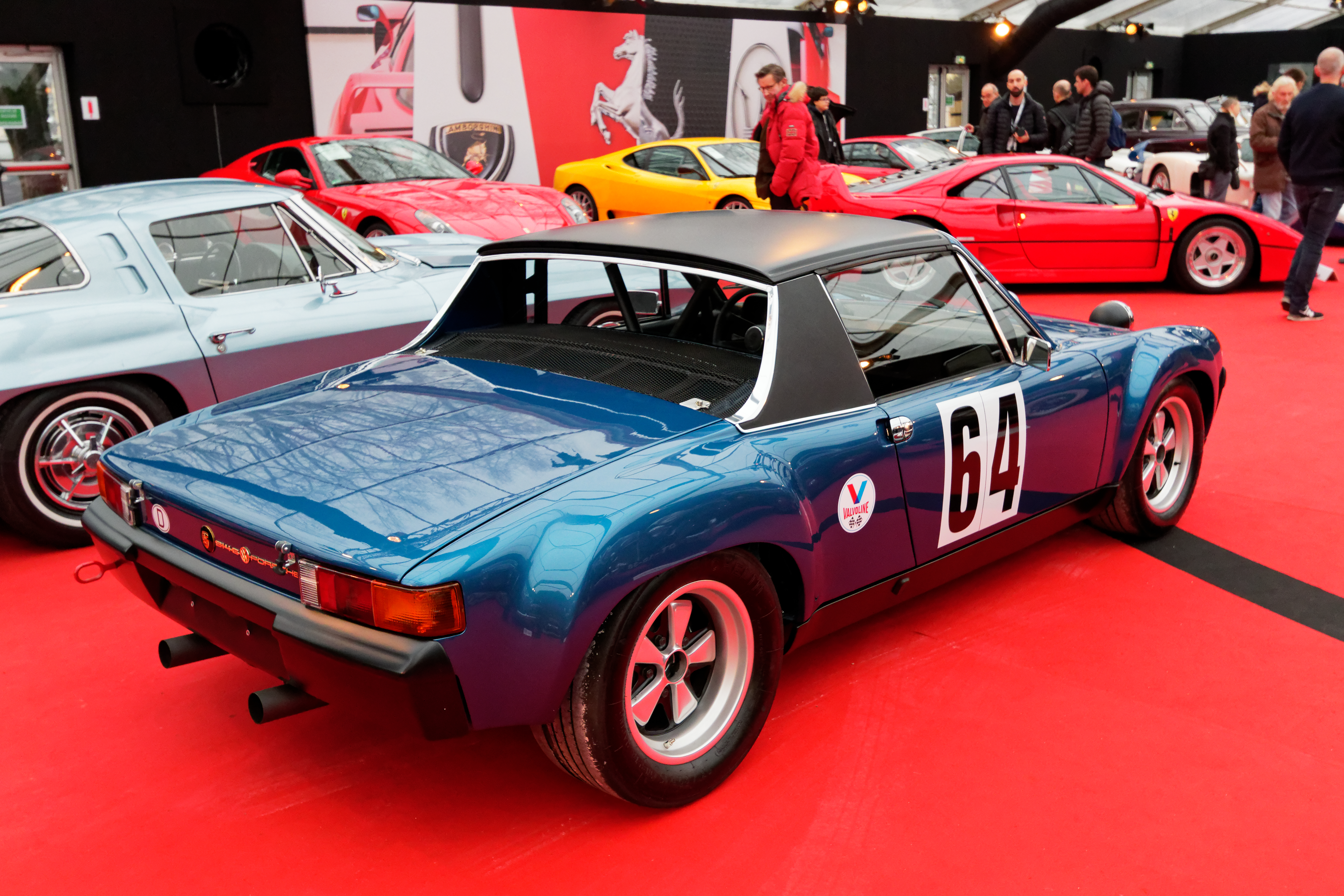
Porsche 914/6 GT rear view

The engine remained at 2.0 litres displacement with Weber Carburetor induction, but was extensively upgraded otherwise. New cylinder heads with larger valves topped aluminum cylinder barrels with chrome-plated bores. A dual-ignition system fired two spark plugs per cylinder. High compression pistons and forged steel piston rods were borrowed from the 911S. A special crankshaft was added. Camshafts and rocker arms came from the 901/20 in the Carrera 6. Power output was up to 210 PS (154.5 kW; 207.1 hp) at 8000 rpm.

Although the factory campaigned the car in rallying, it was more successful in road racing.

In the United States the Porsche+Audi distributor called the car the 914/6R.

==== M471, kits ====
To qualify for SCCA homologation, 500 copies of a car had to be built. It is estimated that Porsche built fewer than 40 GTs with the full race engine. To add to the total, an additional 11 cars were equipped with the Competition Option Group M471 package that included the GT's steel fender flares, rocker panels and nose piece as well as wheel spacers, a set of 6-inch wide Fuchs wheels, and 185/70VR15 tires, but did not include the enhanced engine from the GT. Similar appearance-only kits were also supplied to dealers, totaling about 400 units.

Porsche's application for homologation was successful, but instead of being added to the C Production class, the SCCA put the 914/6 GT into the more competitive B Production class.

=== 914/8 ===
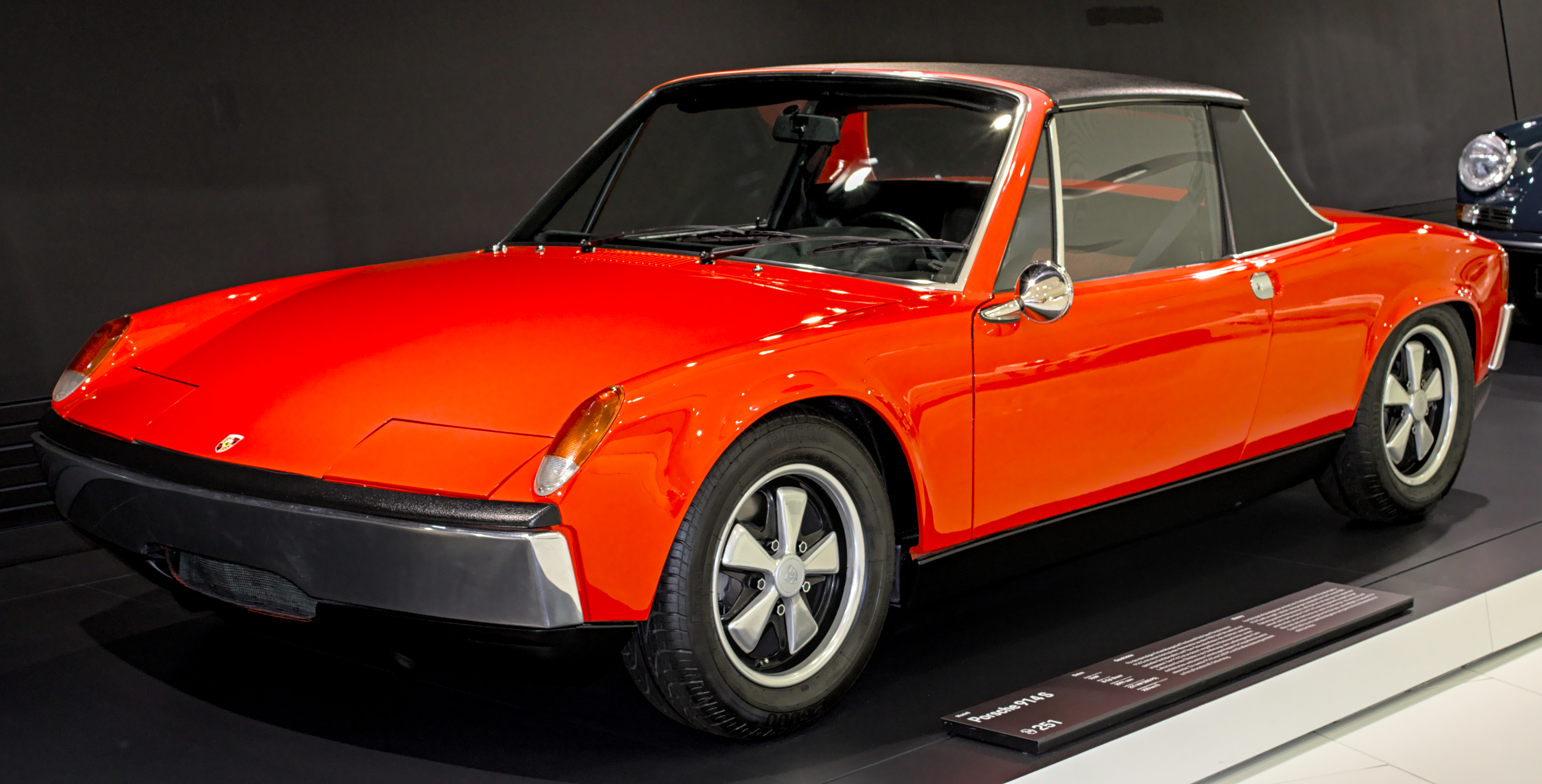
Porsche 914/8

Two prototype 914s, dubbed 914/8 generally and called 914/S by Porsche, were built during 1969. (Note: A four-cylinder car called the 914S was offered in the United States for a short time. It was withdrawn at the request of the factory.) An orange 914/8 was the first constructed, at the instigation of Ferdinand Piëch (then head of the racing department), to prove the concept. Powered by a 350 hp (261 kW; 355 PS) Type 908 flat-eight racing engine, it was built using a surplus handbuilt 914 development prototype bodyshell, chassis No. 914111, and included many differences from the standard vehicle, such as quad headlamps. The second 914/8, a silver, road-registered car powered by a carburetted and detuned 908 race engine making 300 hp (224 kW; 304 PS), was prepared as a gift to Ferry Porsche on his 60th birthday. Also based on a spare prototype shell (chassis No. 914006), it was much closer to the standard car in detail. By all accounts, Ferry did not like the car very much, and it is now in the Porsche Museum. Neither car saw a racetrack except for the purposes of testing. The 914/8 was not considered for production as a regular model.

=== Porsche Tapiro ===
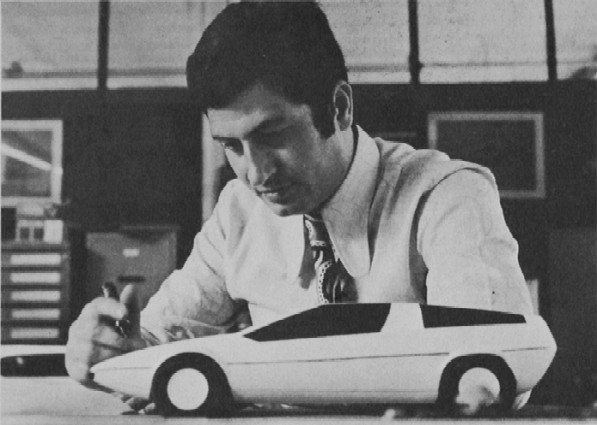
Giorgetto Giugiaro with a scale model of the Porsche Tapiro

The Porsche Tapiro was a concept car designed by Giorgetto Giugiaro's Italdesign studio and built on a 914/6 platform. The car had gullwing doors and two centrally hinged covers over the rear engine and storage compartments. The Tapiro debuted at the 1970 Turin Auto Show. Sold to Argentine composer Waldo de los Ríos, the car was extensively damaged in a fire. It was later bought by Italdesign.

=== Goertz/Eurostyle 914/6R ===
This car was a custom-bodied 914/6R that was first shown at the 1970 Turin Auto Show. The design was done by Count Albrecht von Goertz, and was built by the Turinese carrozzeria Eurostyle. Goertz, who had also done the design for the BMW 507 roadster, produced a body with a tapered nose and a roofline that extended straight back, ending with sloping sail panels that gave the car the appearance of a shooting-brake.

=== Gerber/Sbarro rotary 914 ===
In 1970, Swiss Industrialist Dr. Alfred Gerber contracted compatriot car designer Franco Sbarro to build a customized 914. Sbarro installed the 2-rotor Wankel engine and semi-automatic transaxle from Gerber's NSU Ro 80 in the mid-engined Porsche. The transaxle's inboard disc brakes were retained, and special halfshafts and shift-linkage were fabricated. A radiator was installed in the nose of the car, with fans sourced from a Renault R16. The engine produced 115 hp (85.8 kW), and in the 914 returned 21 mpg_{‑US} (11.2 L/100 km) while allowing the car to reach a top speed of 190 km/h (118.1 mph).

=== Heuliez Murène ===
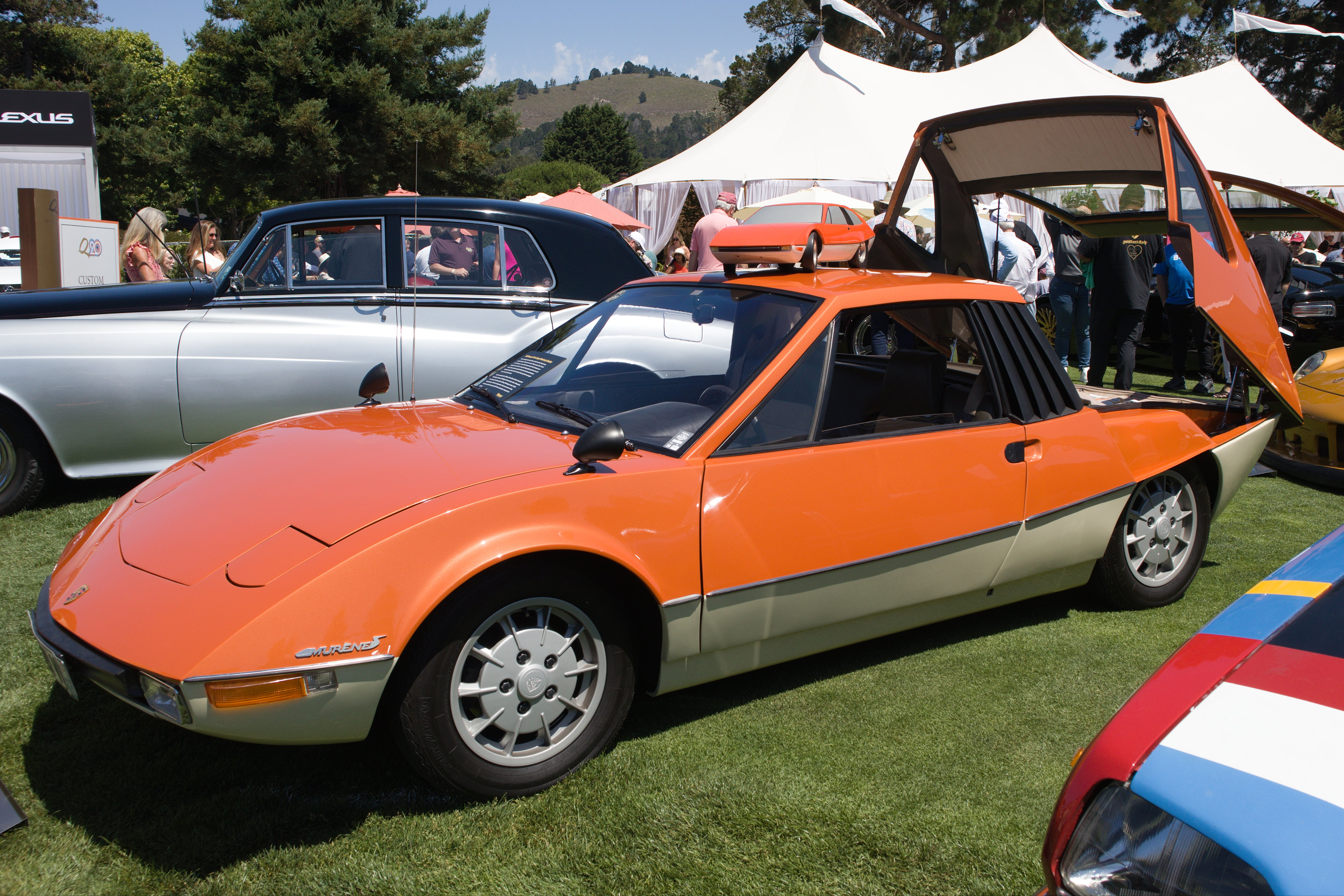
Porsche 914/6 Murène by Heuliez

In 1969, designer Jacques Cooper drew an interpretation of the 914 that he presented to his employer, Brissonneau and Lotz. The French company, a supplier of auto bodies and railcars, approved the project and obtained one of the first 914/6 models built, chassis 1300005, to serve as a basis for the redesigned car. Shortly after this, Brissonneau encountered financial difficulties. Cooper, hoping to get the car into production, arranged, with Brissonneau's approval, for the Heuliez company to take on responsibility for development. A running prototype was completed in just two and one half months. The car was displayed at the 1970 Paris Auto Show on the Heuliez stand as the Heuliez Murène. It did not reach production. Heuliez bought the Murène from Brissonneau in 1971 for ₣24,250. In 2012, the car was sold at auction for €42,889.

=== Hispano Alemán Vizcaya ===
Businessman Werner Bernhard Heiderich was the importer of Porsche for Spain. He established a company named Hispano Alemán to build and sell customized cars. Heiderich contracted with Pietro Frua to produce a new body on a Porsche 914 platform. The car, named the Vizcaya, was first shown at the 1971 Geneva Motor Show. Swiss authorities seized the car owing to a dispute over it between Heiderich and Frua. Heiderich eventually prevailed, and the car next appeared at the 1972 Barcelona Motor Show. The Vizcaya did not go into production.

=== Porsche 916 ===
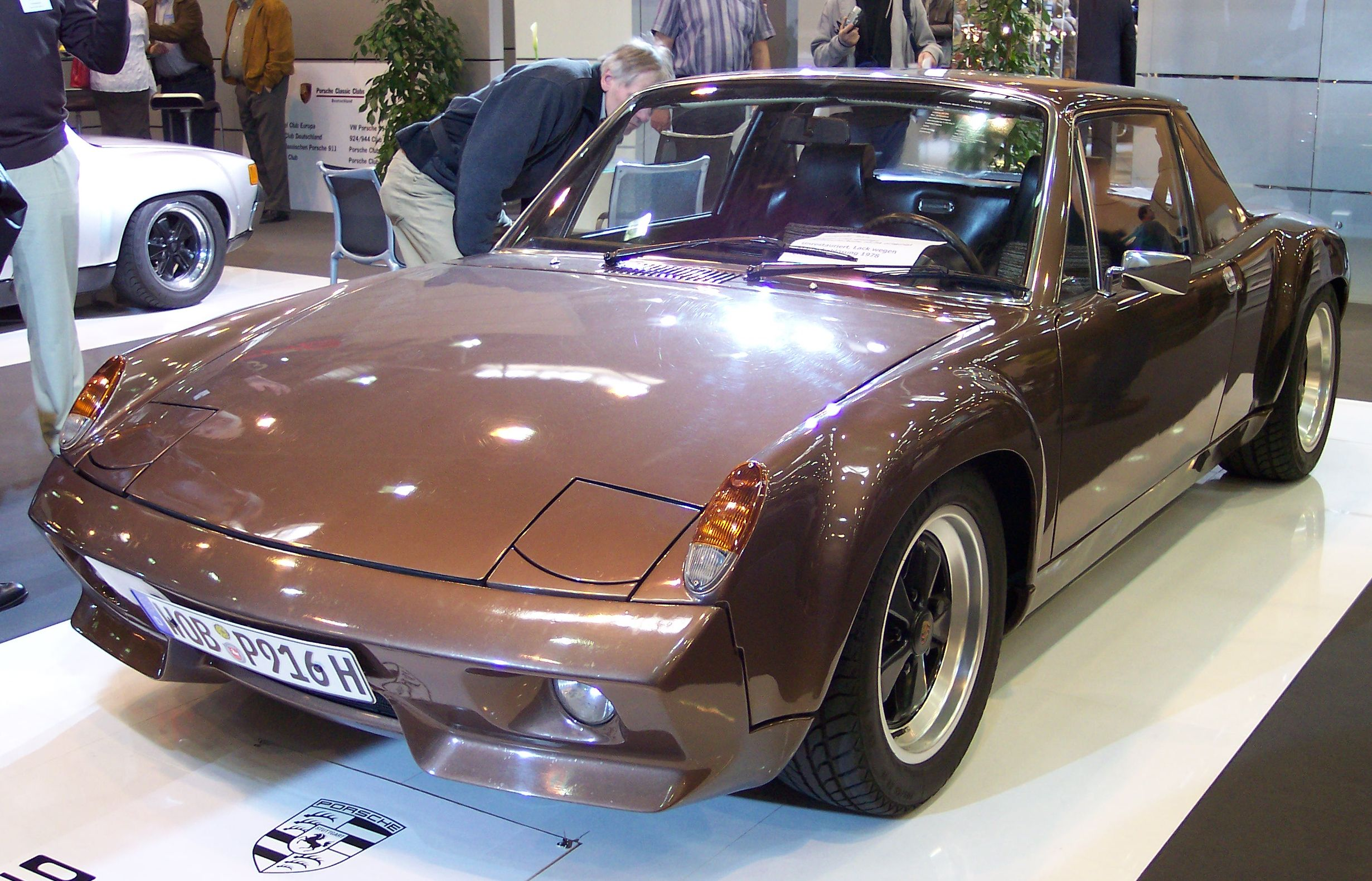
Porsche 916

Planned for the 1972 model year, the Porsche 916 program was cancelled after eleven prototypes were built. The car came with aerodynamic front and rear bumpers and either the 2.4 L engine from the 911S, or the 2.7 L from the Carrera. It was also to have a fixed steel roof, wider wheels, double grilled engine lid, and flared fenders as styled from the 914-6 GT cars. Ventilated disc brakes were fitted to all four wheels. The 916 also used a "mid-engined" version of the then-new 915 transmission, giving a conventional shift pattern with one to four in an H and fifth out on a limb. One 916 was built to US specs and on delivery to the US was fitted with air conditioning by the dealer (Brumos) and has been housed at the Automobile Atlanta 914 museum since 1990.

=== Nordstadt Carrera Käfer (Nordstadt Carrera Beetle) ===
Günter Artz was director of the Hannover Volkswagen dealer Autohaus Nordstadt. In 1973 Artz and Nordstadt unveiled a custom car called the Carrera Käfer that mounted a modified Volkswagen Beetle 1303 body on a Porsche 914/6 chassis. The engine was upgraded to a 2.7 L (165 cu in) flat-six from a Porsche 911 Carrera that produced 210 PS (154.5 kW; 207.1 hp).

=== GM XP-897GT ===
First shown in 1973, General Motors (GM) built the Corvette XP-897GT concept car to showcase their rotary engine technology. Lacking a suitable mid-engined platform, GM bought a 914/6 and shortened the wheelbase by 6.5 in (165 mm). The body was designed in-house by GM and built by Pininfarina in Italy. A GM two-rotor Wankel engine powered the car through a new transaxle. The engine displaced 266 cu in (4,359 cc) and produced 180 hp (134.2 kW). When the rotary engine project was cancelled, GM stored the car at the Vauxhall Design Centre in England. The car was rescued from the crusher by an English enthusiast, who also managed to obtain an original GM rotary engine. The car was scheduled to appear at Amelia Island in 2019.

=== 914 Limited Edition ===
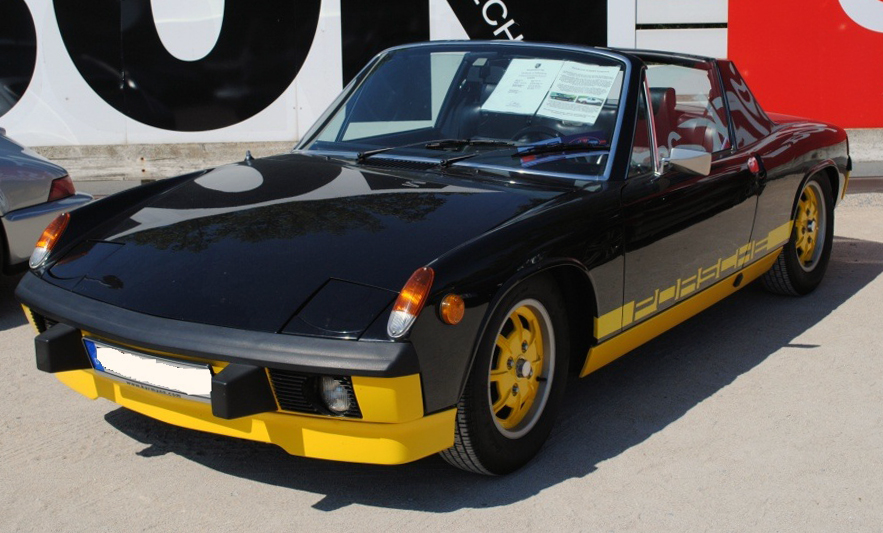
"Bumblebee" (black) 914 LE

In 1974, Porsche produced a series of Limited Edition cars for the North American market to commemorate Porsche's victories in the Can Am racing series. They were equipped with individual color schemes and came standard with otherwise optional equipment. The factory is said to have produced about 1,000 of these vehicles, about 50% Bumblebee and 50% Creamsicle. Variants of this series were manufactured and distributed in very limited numbers to European markets and Japan. Along with the regular Appearance Group option (fog lamps and center console with clock and additional gauges) at $300, the LE package set buyers back another $320. All Limited Editions models came with the 2.0 L (1,971 cc) flat four engine, which was otherwise optional in the standard 914, that produced 91 hp in U.S. trim.

The Creamsicle: With a cream color exterior (paint code U2V9), these cars sported Phoenix red trim, including color matched lower valences and bumpers. This light ivory color scheme concept carried over from the 1973 911 Carrera RS series.

The Bumblebee: Featuring a black exterior (paint code L041), these cars sported a Sunflower yellow trim (paint code L13K). Black body paint color was always an additional cost special option on standard 914 Porsche cars, but was included as a standard component on the black 914 LE cars. All but one photo of the 914 Porsche Can Am prototype cars are Bumblebee cars. The black-based 914 LE color scheme is specific to the 914 LE cars and has no precedent with the Can Am race cars or the 1973 911 Carrera RS series cars. The majority of 914 Limited Editions seem to be Bumblebees.

All 914 LE cars featured a specially designed front spoiler and negative side stripes. Additionally, all Limited Editions were equipped with front and rear anti-roll bars, dual horns, leather covered steering wheel, driving lights, painted rear roll bar trim (as opposed to vinyl clad), Mahle cast aluminum wheels and a center console with an oil temperature gauge, clock, and voltmeter.

=== Other ===
A factory prototype 914/6, (chassis no. 914114), surfaced in the US in 2001. Together with a surviving prototype Sportomatic 914/6 (chassis No. 914120), reputedly in Southern Germany, they are a special part of Porsche history.

== Motorsport ==
A 914/6 GT driven by Frenchmen Claude Ballot-Léna and Guy Chasseuil won the GTS class and finished sixth overall at the 1970 24 Hours of Le Mans.

Brian Redman used a 914/6 to scout the course in practice runs for the 1970 Targa Florio.

=== F1 safety car ===
The Porsche 914 is renowned for having been Formula One's first safety car following its deployment at the 1973 Canadian Grand Prix to help manage the race, which had seen various incidents due to treacherous weather conditions.
