= Operation Bumblebee (UK) =

Operation Bumblebee is an anti-burglary campaign undertaken by London's Metropolitan Police, which aims to crack down on burglary in the capital and raise the public's awareness of measures they can take to protect their homes.

Operation Bumblebee was first introduced to north London in 1991. It was the creation of now retired Detective Chief Superintendent William Peters and was rolled out across the rest of the capital in June 1993. Police would gather intelligence on past offenders through a network of informants and surveillance systems, and carry out dawn raids on the homes of suspects. Another aspect of the operation was the roadshows held regularly throughout London, at which millions of pounds' worth of recovered stolen goods would be put on display, allowing victims of theft to identify and claim their belongings.

In October 2009, Operation Bumblebee was revived, following a sharp increase in residential burglaries. Eighty officers were assigned to specialist anti-burglary squads, and a media campaign urged Londoners to "think like a burglar". In 2013, police involved in Operation Bumblebee began to make use of computer-generated crime maps, to predict where crimes were most likely to reoccur.
