= 1979 BMW M1 Procar Championship =

Motorsport season

Seasons
- ← none 1980 →

The 1979 BMW M1 Procar Championship was the inaugural season of the BMW M1 Procar Championship. The series ran as a support category to the European rounds of the 1979 Formula One season.

== Teams and drivers ==
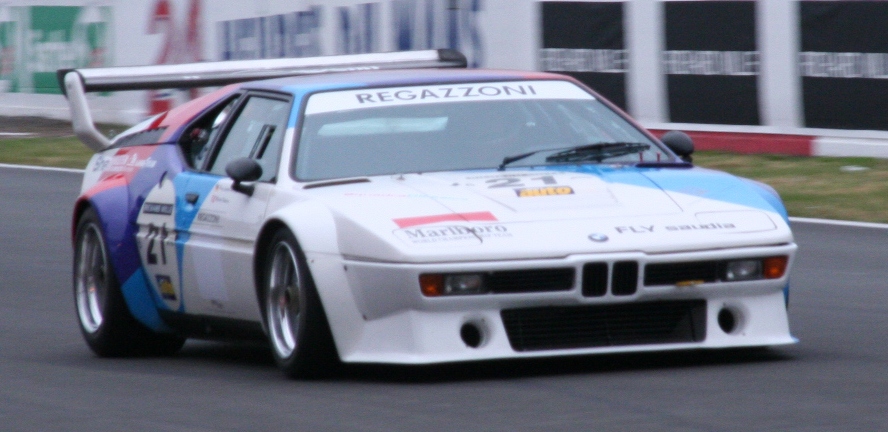
Clay Regazzoni's BMW Motorsport Procar demonstrated at the 2006 24 Hours of Le Mans.

Team	Driver	Rounds
(Netherlands) Alimpo Sport	(Netherlands) Toine Hezemans	All
(Italy) BMW Italia	(Italy) Elio de Angelis	1, 4–5, 7
(West Germany) BMW Motorsport	(United States) Mario Andretti	1
(West Germany) BMW Motorsport	(Netherlands) Michael Bleekemolen	7
(West Germany) BMW Motorsport	(France) Patrick Depailler	2
(West Germany) BMW Motorsport	(West Germany) Hans-Georg Bürger	5–6
(West Germany) BMW Motorsport	(Italy) Teo Fabi	8
(West Germany) BMW Motorsport	(Brazil) Emerson Fittipaldi	2
(West Germany) BMW Motorsport	(France) Jean-Pierre Jarier	2
(West Germany) BMW Motorsport	(Australia) Alan Jones	3–8
(West Germany) BMW Motorsport	(France) Jacques Laffite	1, 5–7
(West Germany) BMW Motorsport	(United Kingdom) Tiff Needell	4
(West Germany) BMW Motorsport	(Brazil) Nelson Piquet	1, 3–4, 7–8
(West Germany) BMW Motorsport	(France) Didier Pironi	3, 5–6
(West Germany) BMW Motorsport	(Switzerland) Clay Regazzoni	All
(West Germany) BMW Motorsport	(Argentina) Carlos Reutemann	4
(Switzerland) BMW Schweiz	(Switzerland) Marc Surer	2–3, 6–8
(Switzerland) Brun Motorsport	(Switzerland) Walter Brun	1–3, 5–6, 8
(France) Ecurie Automobile Arvor	(France) Jean-Louis Lafosse	1–5, 7–8
(Switzerland) Eggenberger Motorsport	(West Germany) Helmut Kelleners	All
(Austria) Franz Konrad Racing	(Austria) Franz Konrad	1–4, 6
(Austria) Franz Konrad Racing	(West Germany) "John Winter"	5
(Austria) GS Team	(Austria) Markus Höttinger	All
(Switzerland) Heidigger Racing Team	(Switzerland) Markus Hotz	1, 4–5
(West Germany) Manfred Cassani	(West Germany) Hans-Joachim Stuck	All
(West Germany) Memphis Team International	(Austria) Sepp Manhalter	1–4, 6–8
(Italy) Osella Squadra Corse	(United States) Eddie Cheever	2
(Italy) Osella Squadra Corse	(Italy) Bruno Giacomelli	1–6, 8
(United Kingdom) Project Four Racing	(Austria) Niki Lauda	All
(West Germany) Schutz Racing	(West Germany) Wolfgang Schütz	All
(West Germany) Team Krebs	(West Germany) Albrecht Krebs	1
(West Germany) Team Krebs	(West Germany) Jochen Mass	5–6
(West Germany) Team Winkelhock	(France) Jean-Pierre Beltoise	3
(West Germany) Team Winkelhock	(West Germany) Manfred Winkelhock	4–8
(United Kingdom) Toleman Group Motorsport	(United Kingdom) Frank Sytner	4
(United Kingdom) Tom Walkinshaw Racing	(Austria) Dieter Quester	All

== Calendar and results ==
No.	Circuit	Dates	Pole position	Winning driver	Winning team	Parent event	Ref.
1	(Belgium) Circuit Zolder	May 12	(France) Jacques Laffite	(Italy) Elio de Angelis	(Italy) BMW Italia	Belgian Grand Prix	
2	Circuit de Monaco	May 26	(Austria) Niki Lauda	(Austria) Niki Lauda	(United Kingdom) Project Four Racing	Monaco Grand Prix	
3	(France) Dijon-Prenois	June 30	(Brazil) Nelson Piquet	(Brazil) Nelson Piquet	(West Germany) BMW Motorsport	French Grand Prix	
4	(United Kingdom) Silverstone Circuit	July 13	(Australia) Alan Jones	(Austria) Niki Lauda	(United Kingdom) Project Four Racing	British Grand Prix	
5	(West Germany) Hockenheimring	July 28	(Australia) Alan Jones	(Austria) Niki Lauda	(United Kingdom) Project Four Racing	German Grand Prix	
6	(Austria) Österreichring	August 12	(Australia) Alan Jones	(France) Jacques Laffite	(West Germany) BMW Motorsport	Austrian Grand Prix	
7	(Netherlands) Circuit Zandvoort	August 26	(Australia) Alan Jones	(West Germany) Hans-Joachim Stuck	(West Germany) Manfred Cassani	Dutch Grand Prix	
8	(Italy) Autodromo Nazionale di Monza	September 9	(Australia) Alan Jones	(West Germany) Hans-Joachim Stuck	(West Germany) Manfred Cassani	Italian Grand Prix	

== Championship standings ==
Points system

Race Position	1st	2nd	3rd	4th	5th	6th	7th	8th	9th	10th
Points	20	15	12	10	8	6	4	3	2	1

Standings

Pos.	Driver	ZOL (Belgium)	MCO (Monaco)	DIJ (France)	SIL (United Kingdom)	HOC (West Germany)	ÖST (Austria)	ZAN (Netherlands)	MNZ (Italy)	Points
1	(Austria) Niki Lauda	Ret	1	8	1	1	Ret	Ret	2	78
2	(West Germany) Hans-Joachim Stuck	Ret	Ret	7	4	2	7	1	1	73
3	(Switzerland) Clay Regazzoni	3	2	5	14	5	4	5	Ret	61
4	(Austria) Markus Höttinger	Ret	6	11	3	Ret	2	Ret	3	45
5	(Netherlands) Toine Hezemans	2	4	9	15	9	10	6	5	44
6	(Brazil) Nelson Piquet	DNS		1	2			Ret	Ret	35
=	(France) Jacques Laffite	Ret				Ret	1	2		35
8	(France) Didier Pironi			3		4	3			34
9	(West Germany) Helmut Kelleners	4	10	Ret	7	6	12	9	4	33
10	(Australia) Alan Jones			2	5	Ret	Ret	8	Ret	26
11	(Switzerland) Marc Surer		Ret	4			8	4	Ret	23
12	(Austria) Dieter Quester	5	Ret	Ret	6	Ret	11	7	7	22
13	(Italy) Elio de Angelis	1			Ret	Ret		Ret		20
=	(West Germany) Manfred Winkelhock				Ret	Ret	5	3	Ret	20
15	(West Germany) Hans-Georg Bürger					3	6			18
16	(West Germany) Wolfgang Schutz	Ret	5	Ret	Ret	Ret	Ret	Ret	6	14
17	(Brazil) Emerson Fittipaldi		3							12
18	(France) Jean-Louis Lafosse	6	Ret	Ret	Ret	Ret		10	Ret	7
19	(France) Jean-Pierre Beltoise			6						6
=	(Austria) Sepp Manhalter	7	11	Ret	11		13	11	9	6
=	(Italy) Bruno Giacomelli	Ret	Ret	10	Ret	8	9		Ret	6
22	(Austria) Franz Konrad	DNS	7	Ret	13		Ret			4
=	(West Germany) Jochen Mass					7	DNS			4
24	(United States) Eddie Cheever		8							3
=	(Argentina) Carlos Reutemann				8					3
=	(Switzerland) Walter Brun	Ret	Ret	Ret		11	Ret		8	3
27	(France) Jean-Pierre Jarier		9							2
=	(United Kingdom) Tiff Needell				9					2
29	(Switzerland) Markus Hotz	Ret			10	Ret				1
=	(West Germany) "John Winter"					10				1
NC	(United Kingdom) Frank Styner				12					0
=	(United States) Mario Andretti	Ret								0
=	(West Germany) Albrecht Krebs	Ret								0
=	(France) Patrick Depailler		Ret							0
=	(Netherlands) Michael Bleekemolen							Ret		0
=	(Italy) Teo Fabi								Ret	0
Pos.	Driver	ZOL (Belgium)	MCO (Monaco)	DIJ (France)	SIL (United Kingdom)	HOC (West Germany)	ÖST (Austria)	ZAN (Netherlands)	MNZ (Italy)	Points

== Bibliography ==
- Robert Weber (June 2014). Automobilsport Racing / History / Passion #02: BMW M1 Procar season 1979. Sportfahrer Verlag. ISSN 2199-126X.
