= Circuit Zandvoort =

Motorsport track in the Netherlands

The Roller coaster in the Dunes
- Location: Zandvoort, North Holland, Netherlands
- Coordinates: 52°23′20″N 4°32′27″E
- Capacity: 105,000
- FIA Grade: 1
- Owner: Prince Bernhard of Orange-Nassau; Menno de Jong
- Opened: 7 August 1948; 78 years ago
- Architect: Jarno Zaffelli
- Former names: CM.com Circuit Zandvoort (2020–June 2025); Circuit Zandvoort (2017–2019); Circuit Park Zandvoort (1989–2016); Circuit van Zandvoort (1948–1988)
- Major events: Current: Formula One; Dutch Grand Prix (1950–1953, 1955, 1958–1971, 1973–1985, 2021–2026); GT World Challenge Europe (2015, 2019–2023, 2025–present); DTM (2001–2018, 2023–present); ADAC GT Masters (2012, 2014–2019, 2021–2022, 2024–present); Future: Formula E; Zandvoort ePrix (2027); Former: FIA WTCR Race of the Netherlands (2007, 2018–2019); Masters of Formula 3 (1991–2006, 2009–2016)
- Website: https://www.circuitzandvoort.nl

Grand Prix Circuit (2020–present)
- Length: 4.259 km (2.646 mi)
- Turns: 14
- Race lap record: 1:11.097 ( (United Kingdom) Lewis Hamilton, Mercedes W12, 2021, F1)

Grand Prix Circuit (1999–2019)
- Length: 4.307 km (2.676 mi)
- Turns: 15
- Race lap record: 1:21.044 ( (Netherlands) Klaas Zwart, Jaguar R5 F1, 2019, F1)

Club Circuit (1990–1998)
- Length: 2.526 km (1.570 mi)
- Turns: 9
- Race lap record: 1:01.043 ( (United Kingdom) Kelvin Burt, Reynard 923, 1992, F3)

Grand Prix Circuit (1980–1989)
- Length: 4.252 km (2.642 mi)
- Turns: 19
- Race lap record: 1:16.538 ( (France) Alain Prost, McLaren MP4/2B, 1985, F1)

Grand Prix Circuit (1972–1979)
- Length: 4.226 km (2.626 mi)
- Turns: 19
- Race lap record: 1:19.438 ( (Canada) Gilles Villeneuve, Ferrari 312T4, 1979, F1)

Grand Prix Circuit (1948–1971)
- Length: 4.193 km (2.605 mi)
- Turns: 19
- Race lap record: 1:19.23 ( (Belgium) Jacky Ickx, Ferrari 312B, 1970, F1)

The Circuit Zandvoort (Dutch pronunciation: [sɪrˈkʋi ˈzɑntfoːrt]), known for sponsorship reasons as the Mascot Circuit Zandvoort, previously known as the Circuit Park Zandvoort until 2017, is a 4.259 km (2.646 mi) motorsport race track located in the dunes north of Zandvoort, Netherlands, near the North Sea coast line and 35 km (22 mi) west of Amsterdam. It returned to the Formula One calendar in 2021 as the location of the revived Dutch Grand Prix. This partnership with Formula One ended in 2026. The circuit has been named as the "Mascot Circuit Zandvoort" for at least three years since July 2025. It is popularly referred to as The Roller coaster in the Dunes by Formula One racing fans. This iconic nickname was given for the track's unique characteristics, where the track winds and rises and falls through the coastal dunes of the North Sea. The combination of extreme banked corners—such as Tarzan and Hugenholtz—and rapid elevation changes give racers a thrilling rollercoaster ride.

== History ==
=== 1930s to mid 1980s ===
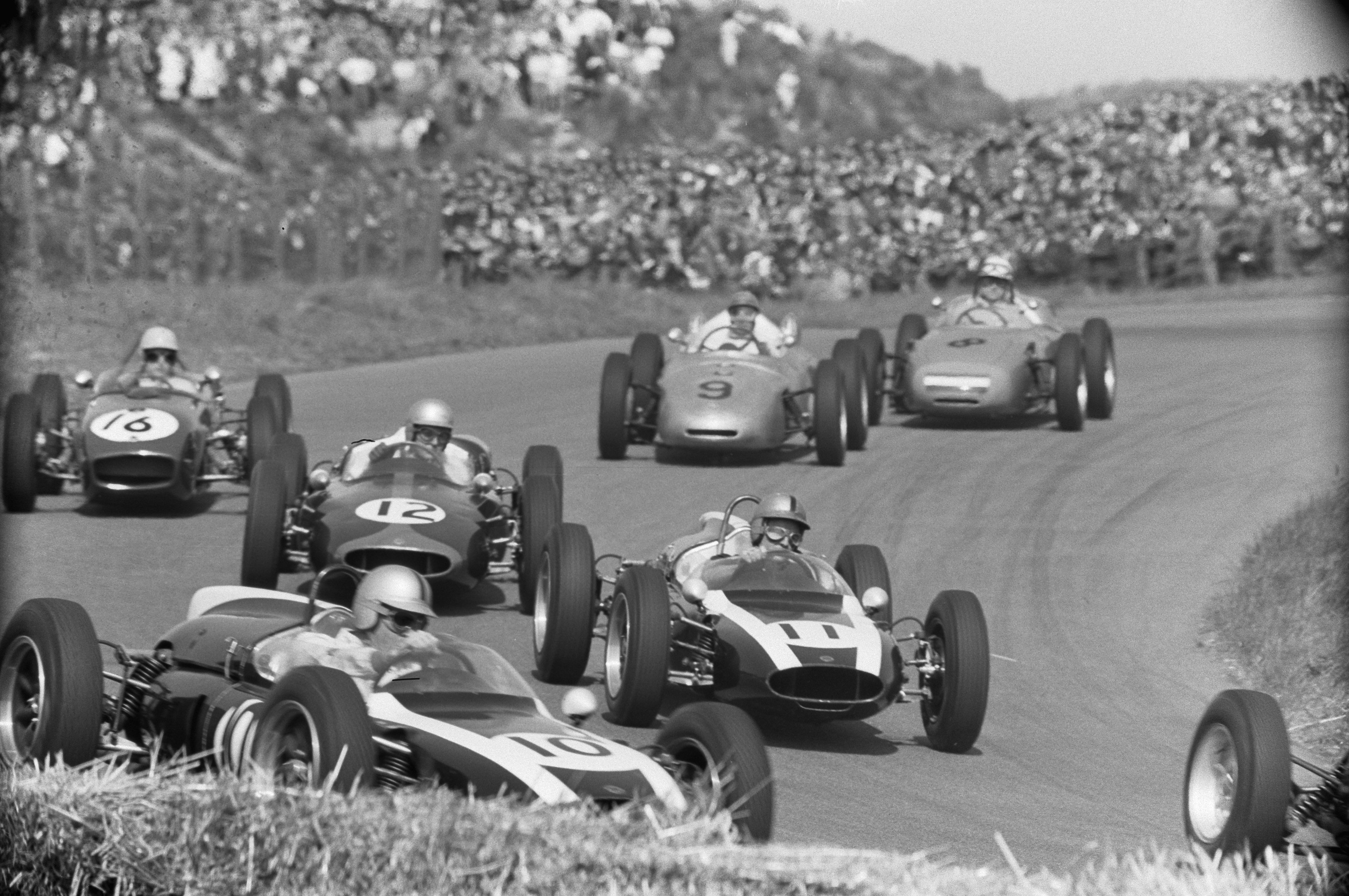
1961 Dutch Grand Prix

There were plans for races at Zandvoort before World War II: the first street race was held on 3 June 1939. However, a permanent race track was not constructed until after the war, using communications roads built by the occupying German army. Contrary to popular belief John Hugenholtz cannot be credited with the design of the Zandvoort track, although he was involved as the chairman of the Nederlandse Automobiel Ren Club (Dutch Auto Racing Club) before becoming the first track director in 1949. Instead, it was 1927 Le Mans winner, S. C. H. "Sammy" Davis who was brought in as a track design advisor in July 1946 although the layout was partly dictated by the existing roads.

The first race on the circuit, the Prijs van Zandvoort, took place on 7 August 1948. The race was renamed the Grote Prijs van Zandvoort (Zandvoort Grand Prix) in 1949, then the Grote Prijs van Nederland (Dutch Grand Prix) in 1950. The 1952 race was the first to be run as a round of the World Championship, albeit to Formula Two regulations rather than Formula One regulations like all the European rounds of the championship that year; a similar situation also applied to the 1953. There was no Dutch Grand Prix in 1954, 1956 or 1957, but 1955 saw the first true Formula One race as part of the Drivers' Championship. The Dutch Grand Prix returned in 1958 and remained a permanent fixture on the F1 calendar (with the exception of 1972) through 1985, when it was held for the last time in the 20th century.

=== Since 1985 ===
To solve a number of problems that had made it impossible to develop and upgrade the circuit, most importantly noise pollution for Zandvoort inhabitants living closest to the track, the track management developed and adopted a plan to move the most southern part of the track away from the nearby housing estate, and rebuild a more compact track in the remaining former 'infield'. In January 1987 this plan got the necessary 'green light' when it was formally approved by the Provincial Council of North Holland. However, only a couple of months later a new problem arose: the company that commercially ran the circuit (CENAV), called in the receiver and went out of business, marking the end of 'Circuit Zandvoort'. Again the track, owned by the municipality of Zandvoort, was in danger of being permanently lost for motorsports. However, a new operating foundation, the "Stichting Exploitatie Circuit Park", was formed and started work at the realization of the track's reconstruction plans. Circuit Park Zandvoort was born and in the summer of 1989 the track was remodeled to an interim Club Circuit of 2.526 km (1.570 mi), while the disposed southern part of the track was used to build a Vendorado Bungalow Park and new premises for the local football and field-hockey clubs.

In 1995, CPZ (Circuit Park Zandvoort) got the "A Status" of the government of the Netherlands and began building an international Grand Prix Circuit. This project was finished in 2001 when, after the track was redesigned to a 4.307 km (2.676 mi) long circuit and a new pits building was realized (by HPG, the development company of John Hugenholtz Jr., son of the former director), a new grandstand was situated along the long straight. One of the major events that is held at the circuit, along with DTM and A1GP, is the RTL Masters of Formula 3, where Formula Three cars of several national racing series compete with each other (originally called Marlboro Masters, before tobacco advertising ban). A noise restriction order was responsible for this event moving to the Belgian Circuit Zolder for 2007 and 2008. However, the race returned to its historical home in 2009.

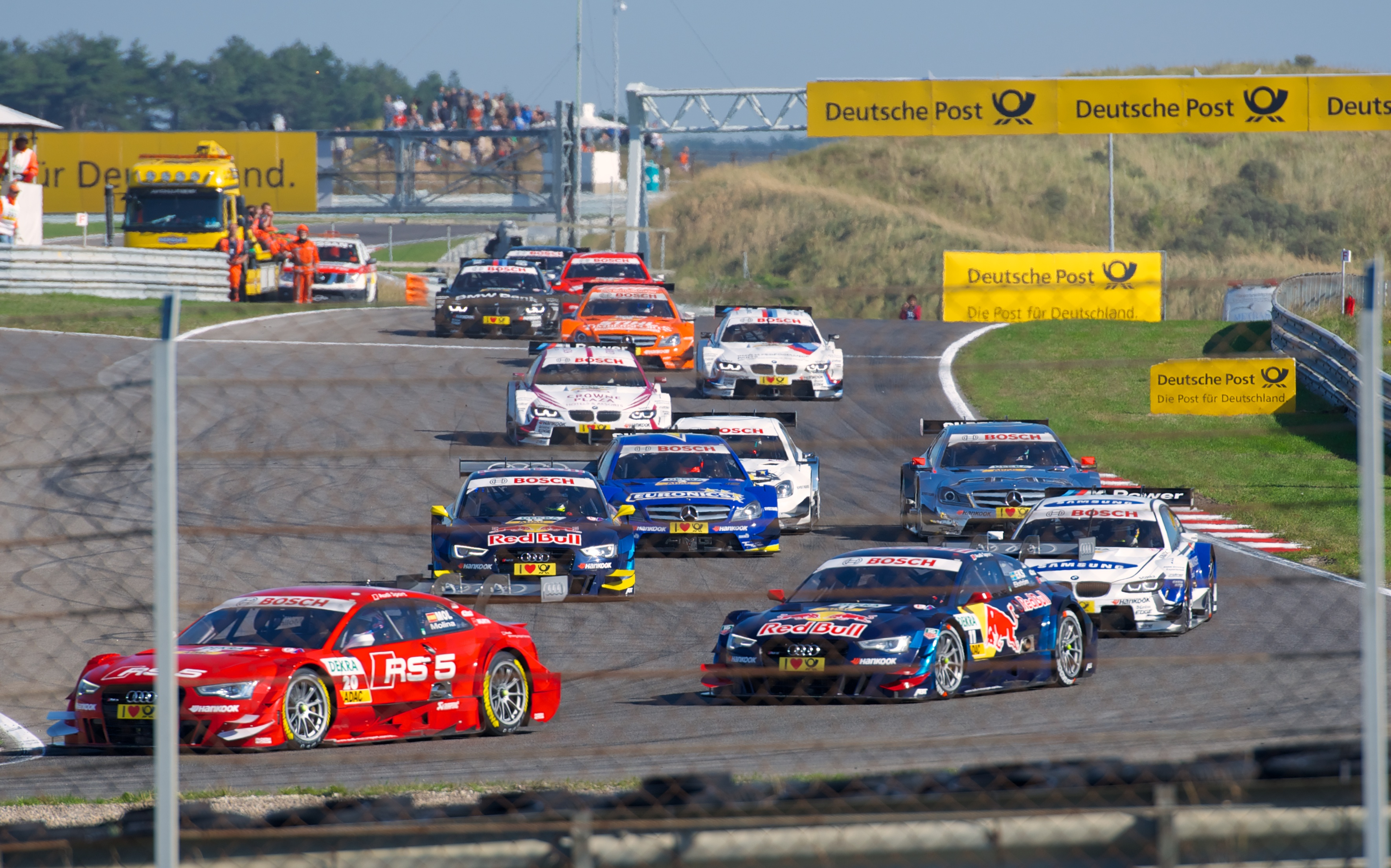
2013 DTM race in Zandvoort

Circuit Park Zandvoort played host to the first race in the 2006/07 season of A1 Grand Prix from 29 September–1 October 2006. On 21 August 2008, the official A1GP site reported that the 2008/09 season's first race has moved from the Mugello Circuit, Italy to Zandvoort on 4–5 October 2008 due to the delay in the building the new chassis for the new race cars. The Dutch round moved to TT Circuit Assen in 2010. A1GP bankrupted before its fifth season and the Dutch round was replaced with Superleague Formula.

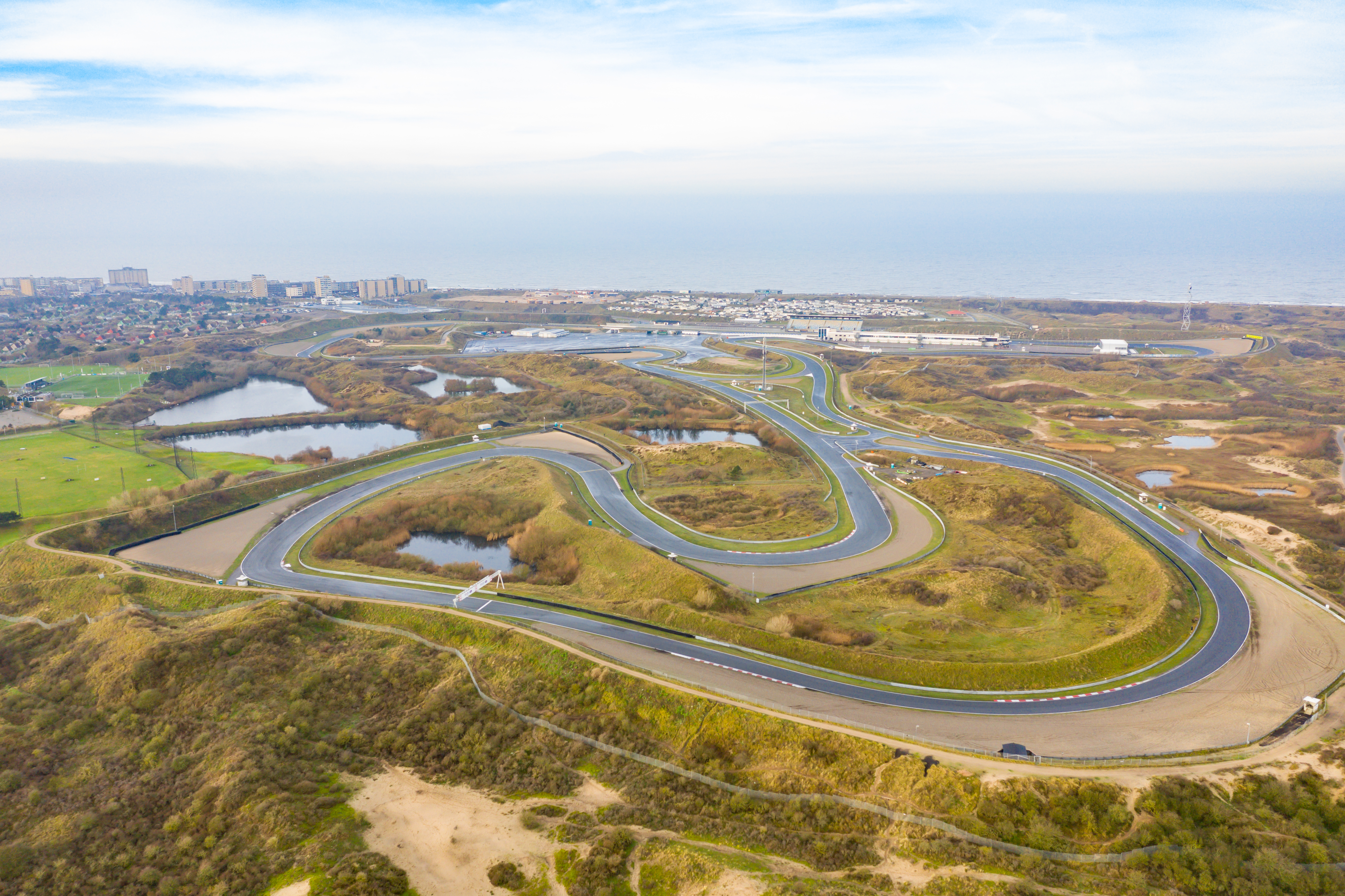
Race track Circuit Zandvoort (2018)

In November 2018 reported that Formula One Management (FOM) had invited the owners of the Zandvoort race track to make a proposal to stage a Grand Prix race in 2020. In March 2019, it was confirmed that a letter of intent had been signed between Zandvoort and FOM to stage the Dutch Grand Prix, dependent on private funding being secured to cover the cost of hosting the race. A deadline of 31 March 2019 was set for a final decision to be made. On 14 May 2019 it was confirmed that Zandvoort would host the Dutch Grand Prix for 2020 and beyond for a duration of at least three years, with the option to host another two years beyond that.

Several alterations were made to the track by Jarno Zaffelli to bring it up to date with F1 standards, including adding banking to turn 14 (Arie Luyendijkbocht) and turn 3 (Hugenholtzbocht), but the layout as a whole remained the same. The municipality of Zandvoort invested four million euros into the infrastructure around the circuit to improve the accessibility to the track. On 29 August 2019, the 2020 Dutch Grand Prix at Zandvoort was included as the fifth race on the provisional schedule, listed on 3 May 2020, between the Chinese Grand Prix and Spanish Grand Prix. The 2020 scheduled appearance was canceled due to the COVID-19 pandemic, however F1 racing did finally return to the circuit on 5 September 2021. On 17 September 2019, it was announced that Zandvoort would host the FIA Formula 2 Championship and FIA Formula 3 Championship, replacing the series' support races at Circuit Paul Ricard.

== The circuit ==
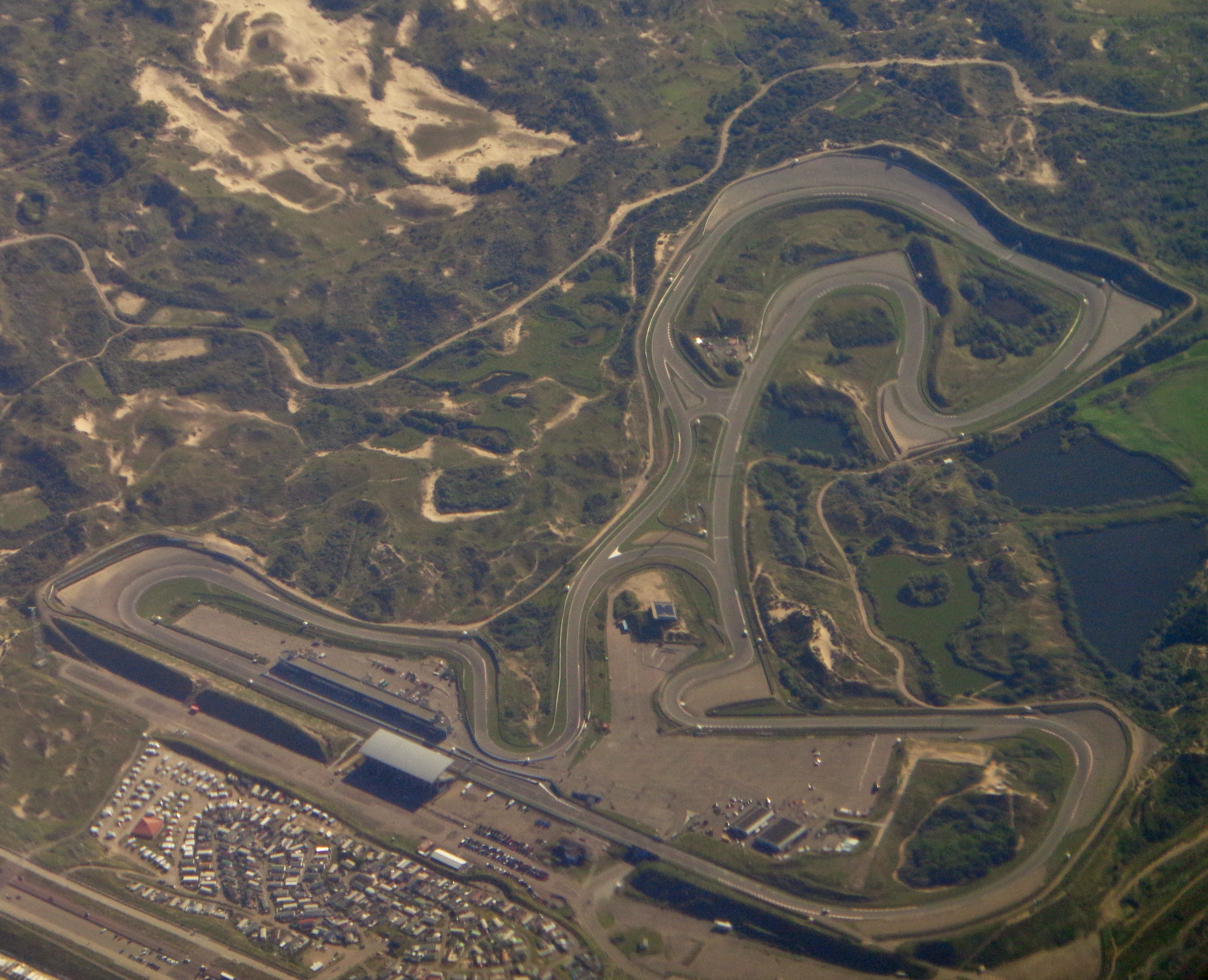
Aerial image of the circuit (2016)

Differences between 1980 and 1999 versions of the circuit

The circuit gained popularity because of its fast, sweeping corners such as Scheivlak as well as the "Tarzanbocht" (Tarzan corner) hairpin at the end of the start/finish straight. Tarzanbocht is the most famous corner in the circuit. Since there is a camber in the corner, it provides excellent overtaking opportunities. It is possible to pass around the outside as well as the easier inside lane. This corner is reportedly named after a local character who had earned the nickname of Tarzan and only wanted to give up his vegetable garden in the dunes if the track's designers named a nearby corner after him. On the other hand, many different stories about Tarzan Corner are known.

The circuit design has been modified and altered several times:

- 1948–1971: length 4.193 km (2.605 mi)
- 1972–1979: length 4.226 km (2.626 mi)
- 1980–1989: length 4.252 km (2.642 mi)
- 1990–1998: length 2.526 km (1.570 mi)
- 1999–2019: length 4.307 km (2.676 mi)
- 2020–present: length 4.259 km (2.646 mi)
Mascot Circuit Zandvoort layout configurations
Grand Prix Circuit (1948–1971)

Grand Prix Circuit (1972–1979)

Grand Prix Circuit (1980–1989)

Grand Prix Circuit (1990–1998)

Grand Prix Circuit (1999–2019)

Grand Prix Circuit (2020–present)

The corners are named as follows (the numbers correspond to the present map, starting at the start/finish line):

- Tarzan corner (1)
- Gerlach corner (2)
- Hugenholtz corner (3)
- Hunserug (4)
- Nameless corner (5)
- Slotemaker corner (6)
- Scheivlak (7)
- Masters corner (formerly Marlboro corner) (8)
- Nameless corner (formerly Renault corner) (9)
- CM.com corner (formerly the Vodafone corner) (10)
- Hans Ernst corner 1 and Hans Ernst corner 2 (formerly Audi S corners) (11 + 12)
- Nameless corner (formerly Kumho corner) (13)
- Arie Luyendyk corner (formerly Bos Uit corner) (14)

The elevation difference is 8.9 m (29 ft).

Turns 3 and 13/14 are extremely cambered corners; turn 3 has a 19-degree bank while turns 13/14 have an 18-degree bank.

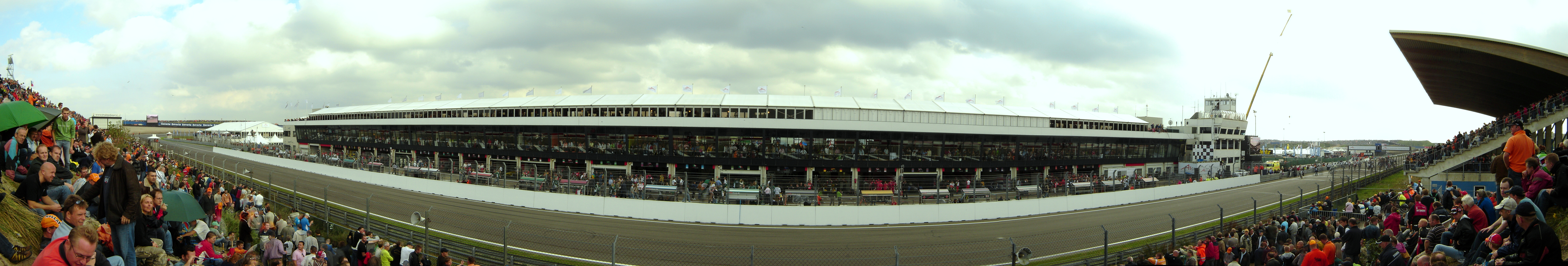
The main straight during the A1GP

== Events ==
Current

- April: Supercar Challenge Voorjaarsraces
- May: Formula Regional European Championship, Deutsche Tourenwagen Masters, ADAC GT Masters, Porsche Carrera Cup Germany, Porsche Carrera Cup Benelux
- June:, FIA Masters Historic Formula One Championship Historic Grand Prix Zandvoort (since 2012), Porsche Sprint Challenge Benelux
- July: F4 British Championship Zandvoort Summer Trophy, Porsche Sprint Challenge Benelux
- August: Formula One Dutch Grand Prix, F1 Academy, Porsche Supercup
- September: GT World Challenge Europe, GT2 European Series, GT4 European Series, Porsche Carrera Cup France
- October: Supercar Challenge Trophy of the Dunes, Porsche Carrera Cup Benelux

Future

- Ferrari Challenge UK (2027)
- Formula E
  - Zandvoort ePrix (2027)
- McLaren Trophy Europe (2027)

Former

- 24H Series
  - 12H Zandvoort (2014–2016)
- A1 Grand Prix (2006–2008)
- ADAC Formel Masters (2012, 2014)
- ADAC Formula 4 (2016, 2019, 2021–2022)
- ADAC GT4 Germany (2019, 2021–2023)
- ADAC TCR Germany Touring Car Championship (2016–2019)
- Alpine Elf Cup (2022, 2025)
- ATS Formel 3 Cup (2002, 2012)
- Audi Sport TT Cup (2016–2017)
- BMW M1 Procar Championship (1979–1980)
- BOSS GP (2002, 2006, 2009–2014, 2017)
- British Formula One Championship (1978–1979)
- British Formula 3 International Series (1971–1973, 1984–1987, 1996)
- British GT Championship (2013)
- Deutsche Rennsport Meisterschaft (1978–1979)
- EFDA Nations Cup (1991, 1994, 1998)
- Eurocup-3 (2023–2024)
- European Formula 5000 Championship (1969–1970, 1973–1975)
- European Formula Two Championship (1967–1968, 1979–1980)
- European Touring Car Championship (1963–1975, 1977–1979)
- European Truck Racing Cup (1990)
- Ferrari Challenge Europe (2000, 2002)
- FIA European Formula 3 Championship (1976–1983)
- FIA Formula 2 Championship (2022–2023)
- FIA Formula 3 Championship (2021–2022)
- FIA Formula 3 European Championship (2011–2013, 2015–2018)
- FIA GT3 European Championship (2011)
- Formula 3 Euro Series (2003–2012)
- Formula BMW ADAC (2002–2007)
- Formula BMW Europe (2009–2010)
- Formula Renault 2.0 Northern European Cup (2006–2013)
- Formula Renault Eurocup (2000, 2020)
- Formula Volkswagen Germany (2001)
- French F4 Championship (2020)
- French Formula Three Championship (1978)
- GB3 Championship (2023–2025)
- International Formula 3000 (1985)
- Interserie (1975)
- Lamborghini Super Trofeo Europe (2019, 2021)
- RTL GP Masters of F3 (1991–2006, 2009–2016)
- Prototype Cup Germany (2023–2024)
- Racecar Euro Series (2011)
- SMP F4 Championship (2016)
- Super Tourenwagen Cup (1994)
- TCR Europe Touring Car Series (2021)
- World Touring Car Championship
  - FIA WTCC Race of the Netherlands (2007)
- World Touring Car Cup
  - FIA WTCR Race of the Netherlands (2018–2019)
- W Series (2021)

== Lap records ==
The official lap record for the current circuit layout is 1:11.097, set by Lewis Hamilton driving for Mercedes in the 2021 Dutch Grand Prix. The all-time fastest official track record set during a race weekend for the current Grand Prix Circuit layout is 1:08.662, set by Oscar Piastri driving for McLaren during qualifying in the 2025 Dutch Grand Prix. As of May 2026, the fastest official race lap records at the Circuit Zandvoort are listed as:

Category	Time	Driver	Vehicle	Event	Date
Grand Prix Circuit (2020–present): 4.259 km (2.646 mi)
Formula One	1:11.097	Lewis Hamilton	Mercedes-AMG F1 W12 E Performance	2021 Dutch Grand Prix	5 September 2021
FIA F2	1:23.078	Frederik Vesti	Dallara F2 2018	2022 Zandvoort Formula 2 round	4 September 2022
FIA F3	1:26.476	Dennis Hauger	Dallara F3 2019	2021 Zandvoort FIA Formula 3 round	5 September 2021
GB3	1:30.023	Alex Dunne	Tatuus MSV-022	2023 Zandvoort GB3 round	14 October 2023
Formula Regional	1:31.847	Jin Nakamura	Tatuus F3 T-318	2025 Zandvoort FREC Round	8 June 2025
LMP3	1:32.292	Xavier Lloveras	Duqueine D-08	2023 Zandvoort Prototype Cup Germany round	24 June 2023
LMP2	1:33.395	Jack Dex	BR Engineering BR01	Historic Grand Prix 2020 (Aston Martin Masters Endurance Legends)	5 September 2020
GT3	1:33.614	Ben Dörr	McLaren 720S GT3 Evo	2024 Zandvoort DTM round	8 June 2024
GT1 (GTS)	1:35.249	Nicky Pastorelli	Maserati MC12 GT1	Historic Grand Prix 2020 (Aston Martin Masters Endurance Legends)	6 September 2020
Formula 4	1:35.349	Sebastian Montoya	Tatuus F4-T014	2021 Zandvoort ADAC F4 round	10 July 2021
SRO GT2	1:36.914	Štefan Rosina	Lamborghini Huracán Super Trofeo Evo2 GT2	2025 Zandvoort GT2 European Series round	18 May 2025
Porsche Carrera Cup	1:37.483	Flynt Schuring	Porsche 911 (992 II) Cup	2026 Zandvoort Porsche Carrera Cup Germany round	24 May 2026
Group 4 sports car	1:42.280	Nicky Pastorelli	Lola T70 MkIIIB	Historic Grand Prix 2020 (Masters Historic Sports Cars)	6 September 2020
GT4	1:43.170	Grégory Guilvert	Audi R8 LMS GT4 Evo	2025 Zandvoort GT4 European Series round	17 May 2025
TCR Touring Car	1:44.520	Tom Coronel	Audi RS 3 LMS TCR (2021)	2021 Zandvoort TCR Europe round	19 June 2021
Alpine Elf Cup	1:45.164	Nicolas Ciamin	Alpine A110 Cup	2022 Zandvoort Alpine Elf Europa Cup round	19 June 2022
Historic Formula Three	1:46.993	Marcel Biehl	Ralt RT1	Historic Grand Prix 2020 (Historische Monoposto Racing)	6 September 2020
Group 6 prototype	1:49.739	Felix Haas	Lola T210	Historic Grand Prix 2020 (Dunlop Historic Endurance Cup)	6 September 2020
Group 2 touring car	1:52.410	Heinz Schmersal	Ford Escort Mk2 RS1800	Historic Grand Prix 2020 (NKRECO GTTC)	5 September 2020
Group 5 sports car	1:52.541	Michael Funke	Ford GT40 MkI	Historic Grand Prix 2020 (HTGT)	6 September 2020
Renault Clio Cup	1:54.608	David Pouget	Renault Clio R.S. V	2023 Zandvoort Renault Clio Cup Europe round	14 October 2023
Group 3 GT	1:56.319	Martin Greensall	Shelby Daytona Coupe	Historic Grand Prix 2020 (Masters Gentlemen Drivers)	5 September 2020
Grand Prix Circuit (1999–2019): 4.307 km (2.676 mi)
Formula One	1:21.044	Klaas Zwart	Jaguar R5 F1	2019 BOSS GP Series Zandvoort round	19 May 2019
Formula Three	1:28.204	Lando Norris	Dallara F317	2017 Zandvoort F3 European Championship round	19 August 2017
A1GP	1:28.353	Adrian Zaugg	Lola A1GP	2007 Zandvoort A1GP round	30 September 2007
DTM	1:32.411	Marco Wittmann	BMW M4 DTM	2014 Zandvoort DTM round	29 September 2014
GT3	1:36.270	Luca Ludwig	Mercedes-AMG GT3	2017 Zandvoort ADAC GT Masters round	22 July 2017
Formula Renault 2.0	1:36.688	Chris van der Drift	Tatuus FR2000	2006 Zandvoort Formula Renault 2.0 Northern European Cup round	5 June 2006
Formula 4	1:38.385	Dennis Hauger	Tatuus F4-T014	2019 Zandvoort ADAC F4 round	11 August 2019
Formula Volkswagen	1:40.211	Elran Nijenhuis	Reynard Formula Volkswagen	2001 Zandvoort Formula Volkswagen Germany round	23 September 2001
Porsche Carrera Cup	1:41.155	Thomas Preining	Porsche 911 (991 II) GT3 Cup	2018 Zandvoort Porsche Carrera Cup Germany round	18 August 2018
GT1	1:41.430	Cor Euser	Marcos Mantis LM600	2004 Zandvoort Euro GT round	8 August 2004
ADAC Formel Masters	1:42.164	Marvin Kirchhöfer	Dallara Formulino	2012 Zandvoort ADAC Formel Masters round	5 May 2012
Formula BMW	1:43.386	Michael Christensen	Mygale FB02	2009 Zandvoort Formula BMW Europe round	14 June 2009
TCR Touring Car	1:45.901	Yann Ehrlacher	Honda Civic Type R TCR (FK8)	2018 FIA WTCR Race of the Netherlands	20 May 2018
Formula Renault 1.6	1:46.359	Anton de Pasquale	Signatech FR 1.6	2014 1st Zandvoort Formula Renault 1.6 NEC round	21 April 2014
V8Star Series	1:46.471	Thomas Mutsch	Audi A6	2004 Zandvoort Euro GT round	8 August 2004
GT4	1:46.480	Ricardo van der Ende	BMW M4 GT4	2016 Zandvoort GT4 European Series round	9 October 2016
Audi Sport TT Cup	1:48.219	Mikel Azcona	Audi TT Cup	2017 Zandvoort Audi Sport TT Cup round	20 August 2017
Super 2000	1:48.858	Luca Rangoni	BMW 320si	2007 FIA WTCC Race of the Netherlands	6 May 2007
Club Circuit (1990–1998): 2.526 km (1.570 mi)
Formula Three	1:01.043	Kelvin Burt	Reynard 923	1992 Masters of Formula 3	2 August 1992
Super Touring	1:09.980	Rinaldo Capello	Audi 80 Quattro Competition	1994 Zandvoort STW Cup round	17 July 1994
Group B	1:10.530	Mike Hezemans	Porsche 911 (964) Carrera RSR 3.8	1994 Zandvoort ADAC GT Cup round	17 July 1994
Group N	1:17.087	Roger Ciapponi	Alfa Romeo 33 QV	1993 1st Zandvoort Dutch Touring Car Championship round	21 March 1993
Group A	1:18.470	Michael Widmann	Nissan 200SX	1994 Zandvoort ADAC GT Cup round	17 July 1994
Grand Prix Circuit (1980–1989): 4.252 km (2.642 mi)
Formula One	1:16.538	Alain Prost	McLaren MP4/2B	1985 Dutch Grand Prix	25 August 1985
Formula 3000	1:23.645	Christian Danner	March 85B	1985 Zandvoort F3000 round	24 August 1985
Formula Three	1:31.700	Alain Ferté	Martini MK34	1981 Zandvoort European F3 round	8 June 1981
Formula Two	1:35.631	Brian Henton	Toleman TG280B	1980 Zandvoort European F2 round	20 July 1980
BMW M1 Procar	1:36.900	Jacques Laffite	BMW M1 Procar	1980 Zandvoort BMW M1 Procar round	31 August 1980
Grand Prix Circuit (1972–1979): 4.226 km (2.626 mi)
Formula One	1:19.438	Gilles Villeneuve	Ferrari 312T4	1979 Dutch Grand Prix	26 August 1979
Formula Two	1:21.700	Eddie Cheever	Osella FA2/79	1979 Zandvoort European F2 round	15 July 1979
Formula 5000	1:23.300	Bob Evans	Lola T332	1974 Zandvoort European F5000 round	3 June 1974
Group 7	1:23.600	Tim Schenken	Porsche 917/10 TC	1975 Int. ADAC-Noordzee Cup Zandvoort	24 August 1975
Formula Three	1:29.020	Arie Luyendyk	Lola T670	1978 Zandvoort European F3 round	27 March 1978
BMW M1 Procar	1:30.519	Elio de Angelis	BMW M1 Procar	1979 Zandvoort BMW M1 Procar round	26 August 1979
Group 2	1:34.100	Toine Hezemans	Ford Capri RS 3100	1974 Zandvoort ETCC round	11 August 1974
Original Grand Prix Circuit (1948–1971): 4.193 km (2.605 mi)
Formula One	1:19.230	Jacky Ickx	Ferrari 312B	1970 Dutch Grand Prix	21 June 1970
Formula 5000	1:23.900	Peter Gethin	McLaren M10B	1970 Zandvoort European F5000 round	19 April 1970
Formula Two	1:26.840	Richard Attwood	Tecno TF68	1968 Zandvoort European F2 round	28 July 1968
Formula Three	1:32.000	Cyd Williams	Brabham BT21B	1969 Zandvoort French F3 round	31 August 1969
Group 2	1:38.500	Helmut Marko	Ford Capri RS 2600	1971 Zandvoort ETCC round	28 August 1971
Formula Junior	1:39.600	Frank Gardner	Brabham BT6	1963 Zandvoort Formula Junior round	1 September 1963
Group 5	1:40.600	Toine Hezemans	Porsche 911	1969 Zandvoort ETCC round	31 August 1969

== Fatal accidents ==
In the history of the circuit, several fatal accidents have occurred.

Name	Date	Description
Hendrik Dik	22 March 1952	Dik's Peugeot did not stop after completing the stage, but went straight on through some fences. The car then hit a small hill and rolled. It was later determined that Dik had suffered a fatal heart attack at the wheel of his car.
Wim Gerlach	10 June 1957	Wim Gerlach rolled his Porsche during a sportscar race at Zandvoort on 9 June 1957. The car was not equipped with a rollcage and Gerlach, who was not wearing seatbelts, had his head crushed between the door of the car and the earth bank. The corner where the accident occurred was later named the Gerlachbocht.
Werner Engel	30 April 1958	Crashed his Mercedes-Benz 300 SL cabriolet during the final stage of that year's Tulip Rally. As was usual at the time, the Tulip Rally's final stage was run as a race at Zandvoort but anti-clockwise so as to counter unfair advantages for drivers with racing experience of the track. Engel's car crashed and overturned on the back-stretch of the track, on the short straight leading away from Tunnel-Oost (in the direction of Scheivlak corner) and came to rest upside down on the track.
Ian Raby	7 November 1967	Died of injuries sustained on the 5th lap of the European Formula 2 Zandvoort round.
Chris Lambert	28 July 1968	Lambert was killed after he collided with Clay Regazzoni during the Dutch round of the European Formula 2 Championship, launching Lambert's Brabham BT23C over the guardrail and onto the pedestrian path below.
Piers Courage	21 June 1970	The suspension or steering in Courage's car broke on the flat out 'Tunnel Oost' section. Instead of rounding the bend, the car went straight on into the steep dunes, disintegrated on impact and caught fire as the engine broke away from the monocoque; automatic fuel-sealing equipment was not yet being used. During the impact one of the front wheels broke loose and hit Courage's head, taking off his helmet (wheel and helmet came rolling out of the cloud of dust simultaneously). It is assumed that Courage was killed instantly (or at least severely wounded and knocked unconscious) when the wheel hit him, rather than dying in the subsequent fire, as the monocoque was upright (not upside down, as is often stated by those who confuse the Courage and Williamson accidents) when it came to rest and did not seem to trap its driver in any way.
Roger Williamson	29 July 1973	Williamson lost control of his car due to a suspected tyre failure during the 1973 Dutch Grand Prix and crashed into the barriers, spun upside-down and caught fire. David Purley stopped his own race and tried unsuccessfully to save Williamson. The circuit was poorly prepared and not enough fire extinguishers were on hand.
Rob Slotemaker	29 July 1979	Slotemaker was killed when he crashed his Chevrolet Camaro during the "Trophy of the Dunes" touring car race. His car spun on a patch of oil and collided with a course car parked alongside the track. Despite the relatively minor force of the accident, he suffered a broken neck and died instantly. A section of the circuit, the left-hander after Hunserug, is named in his memory.
Hans-Georg Bürger	20 July 1980	Crashed in his Tiga F280-BMW at Scheivlak corner during the warm-up for the European Formula 2 Zandvoort round. He succumbed to his head injuries in hospital two days later.
Alain Vinckx	29 May 1987	During a World Record Day event, Vinckx was killed when he attempted a stunt in which he drove a Chevrolet Camaro through four buses placed back to back. The second bus was positioned too low, the roof of the car was cut from it by the roof of the bus. Vinckx was unable to duck away from danger and was decapitated.
Oliver Heimann	30 March 1991	Heimann was unable to avoid the car of another competitor which had come to a standstill. Heimann broke his neck in the accident; he died in a hospital in Haarlem, about one hour after the crash.
Henk Schoorstra	29 July 2010	After colliding with another car, Henk Schoorstra's single-seater went out of control and crashed into the guard rail between Hunserug and the Rob Slotemaker bend. The driver was able to drive the car into the run-off area but it caught fire and Schoorstra was killed at the scene.
David Ferrer	2 September 2017	During the Historic Grand Prix Zandvoort Ferrer crashed with his March 701 from 1970. The accident happened in the Arie Luyendijkbocht where he lost control of the car and crashed into the barriers. Marshalls got him out of the car and Ferrer was brought to a hospital, where he later died due to his injuries.

== Cycling and running competitions ==
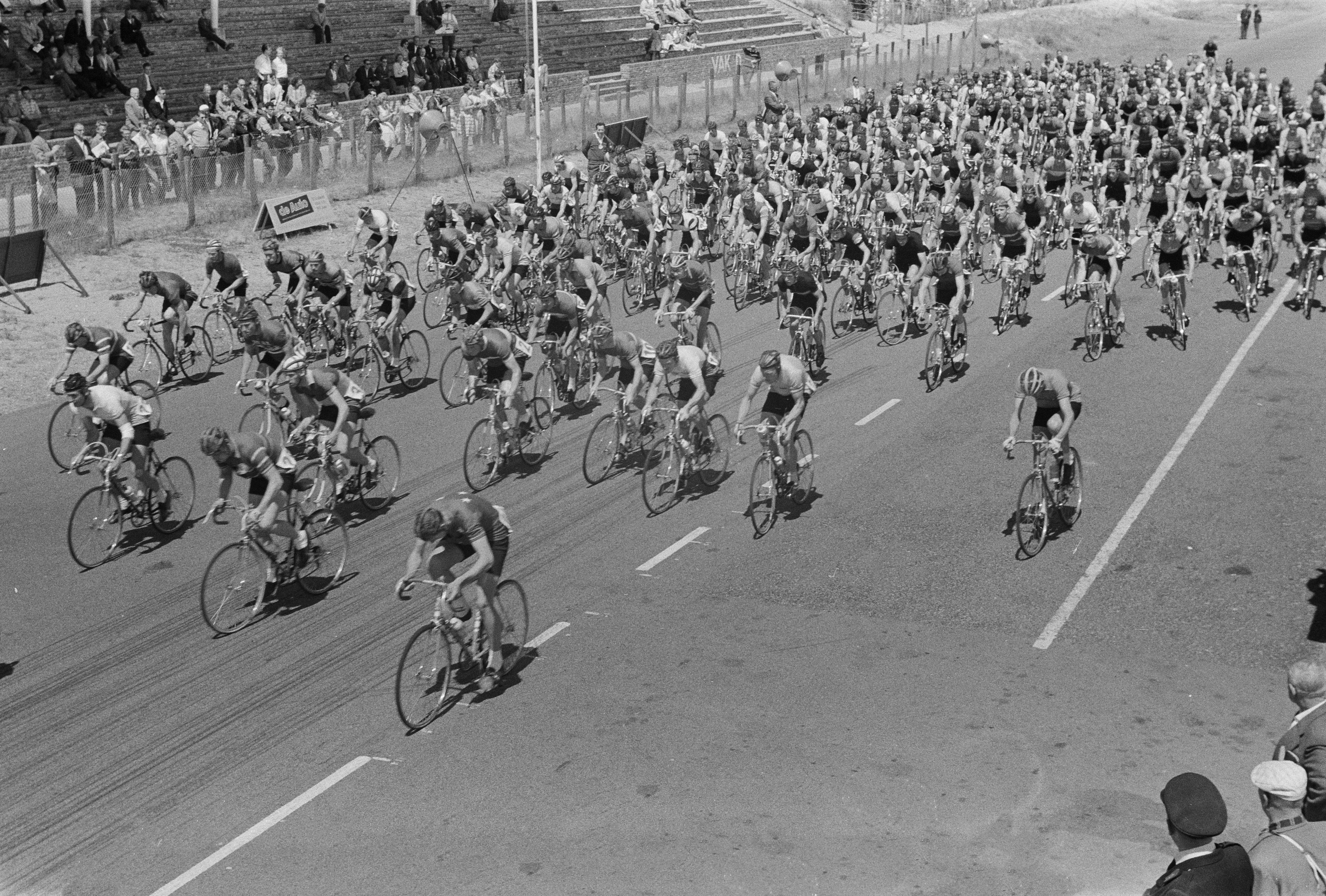
1960 amateur cycling championship

Motor racer Willy Koppen was the first woman to participate in motor trials in the early fifties on the circuit. In August 1959 the UCI Road World Championships men's race was held at Zandvoort. André Darrigade of France won the 180 mi (290 km) race, Tom Simpson (Britain) was 4th. In 1994 a large interregional amateur race cycling race was organised by HSV De Kampioen in Haarlem. Since 2008, the course has been used as the venue for the Runner's World Zandvoort Circuit Run, a 5-kilometre road running competition. The 2010 edition of the race attracted Lornah Kiplagat, a multiple world champion, who won the ladies 5 km race.

The Cycling Zandvoort 24h race was first held on 25–26 May 2013. It is open for public for soloists and teams up to 8 riders. A 6-hours was added to the event in 2016. On 13./14. June 2015 (12:00) the Cycling Zandvoort – 24 hour race over 4307-m-laps took place.

== See also ==
- List of Formula One circuits
