= Sports prototype =

Purpose-built racing car not intended for general production or use beyond motorsport

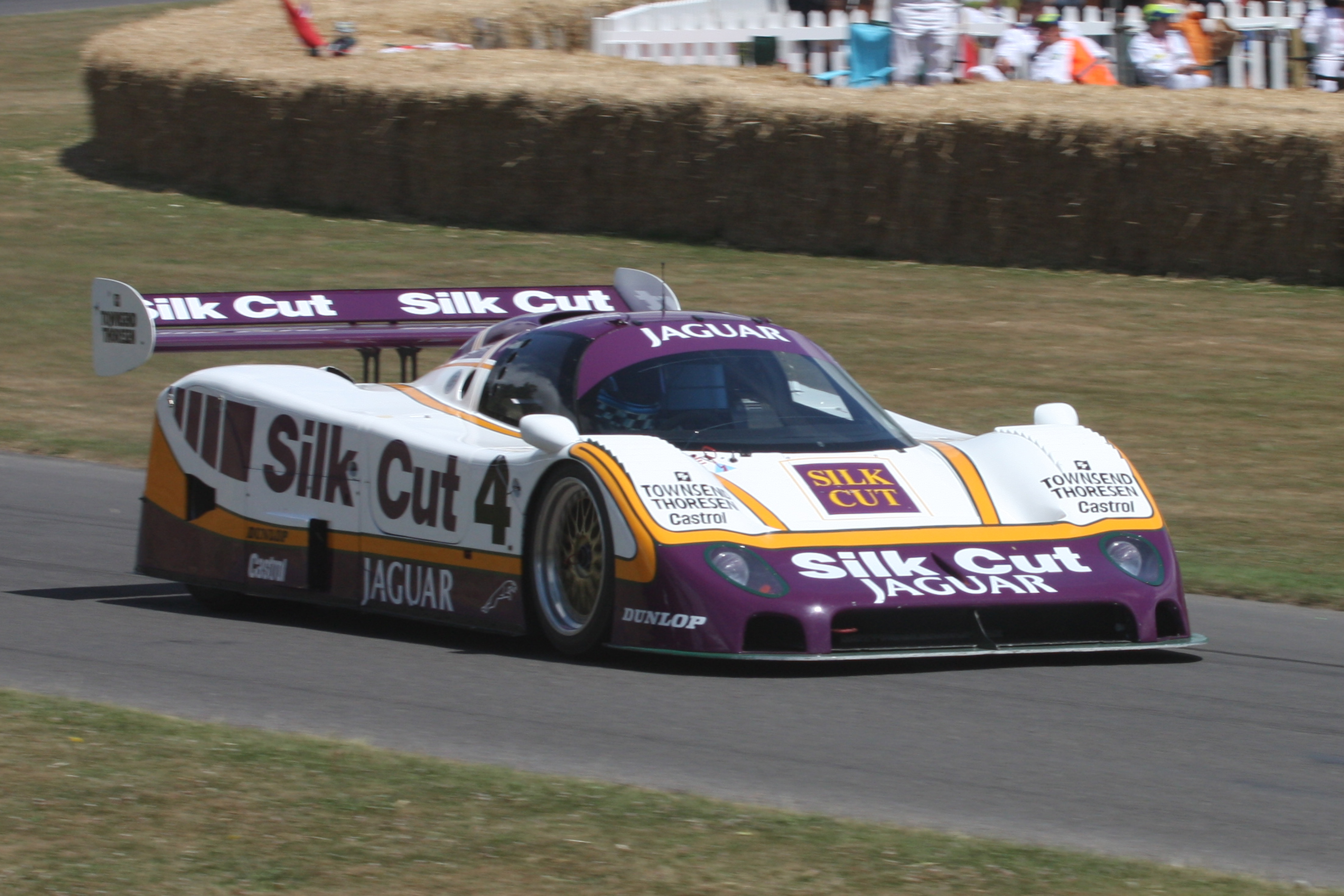
The Jaguar XJR-8, Group C, produced over 700 horsepower.

A sports prototype, sometimes referred to simply as a prototype, is a type of race car that is used in high-level categories of sports car racing. They are purpose-built auto-sports race cars, as opposed to production-car based or street-legal, low-volume homologation specials – thus entirely not intended for consumer purchase, or production beyond the fabrication of the (nearly) unique cars entered into races and in race-car competition classes or "formulas", with sufficiently open regulations to allow for vehicles of unique design to partake.

Prototype racing cars have competed in sports car racing since before World War II, but became the top echelon of sports cars in the 1960s as they began to replace homologated sports cars. Current ACO regulations allow most sports car series to use two forms of cars: grand tourers (GT cars), which are strictly based on production street cars, and sports prototypes, which are allowed a great amount of flexibility within set rule parameters.

From the 1953 season to 1984, the World Sportscar Championship titles were awarded to manufacturers of sports prototypes (except 1978–1981). From 1985 to 1992, titles were awarded to teams entering sports prototypes.

In historic racing, they are often called "sports racing cars". Sometimes, they are metonymically referred to as "Le Mans cars", as the 24 Hours of Le Mans has been closely associated with the category in recent decades and features entries from several of the main championships contested by prototypes.

== Types of sports prototypes ==
Since the 1960s, various championships have allowed prototypes to compete. However, most championships have had their own set of rules for their prototype classes. Listed here are some of the more commonly known types of prototypes.

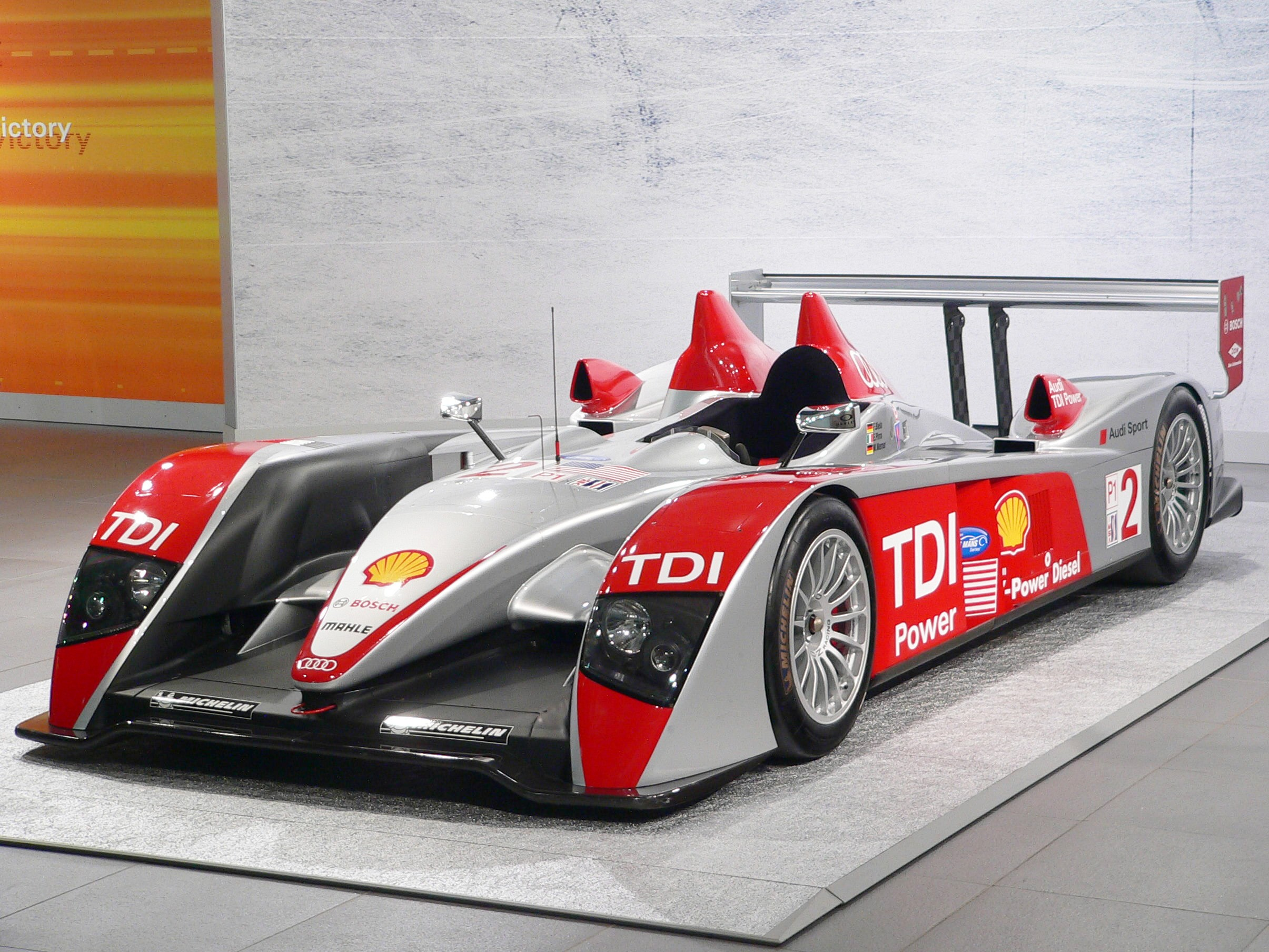
The Audi R10 is one of the most successful Le Mans Prototypes in history, winning 36 out of 48 races, and 4 Constructors' Championships (3 in the American Le Mans Series, and 1 in the European Le Mans Series)

- Group 7
- Group 6
- Group C
- Group CN
- Grand Touring Prototype (GTP)
- Le Mans Prototype (LMP)
- Le Mans Prototype Challenge (LMPC)
- Le Mans Hypercar (LMH)
- Daytona Prototype (DP)
- Daytona Prototype International (DPi)
- Le Mans Daytona h (LMDh)
- Sports 2000
