= Willy Koppen =

Dutch female motorcycle racer

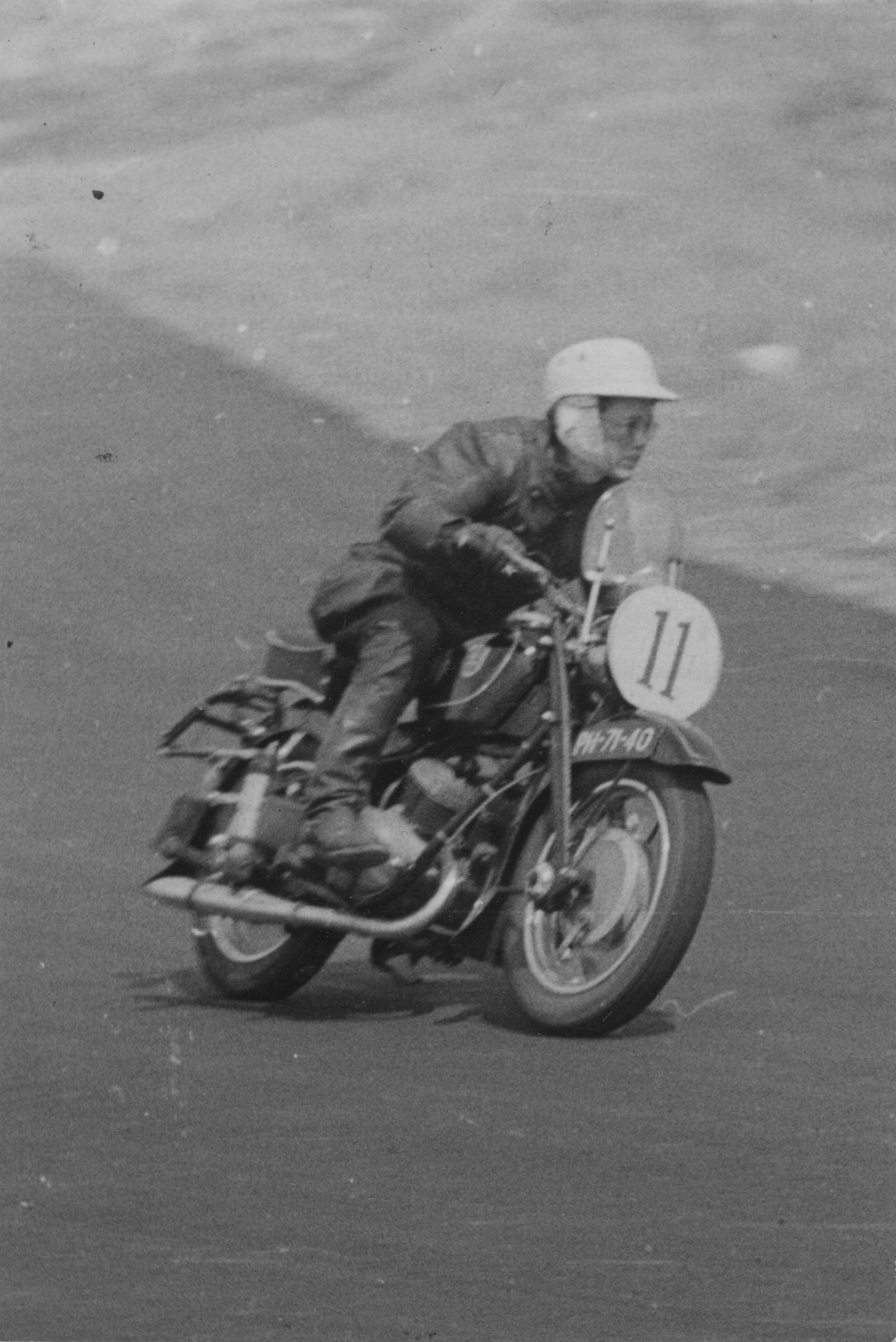
- Koppen racing at Circuit Zandvoort in 1954
- Nationality: Netherlands
- Born: Will Elisabeth Koppen; 7 January 1924 Overveen, Netherlands
- Died: 22 October 2002 (aged 78) De Bilt, NL
- Former teams: Private solo rider
- Fastest laps: 130 km/h Zandvoort circuit

Previous series
- 1952, 1953, 1954, 1955: Madrid, Monaco, Schio, Zandvoort

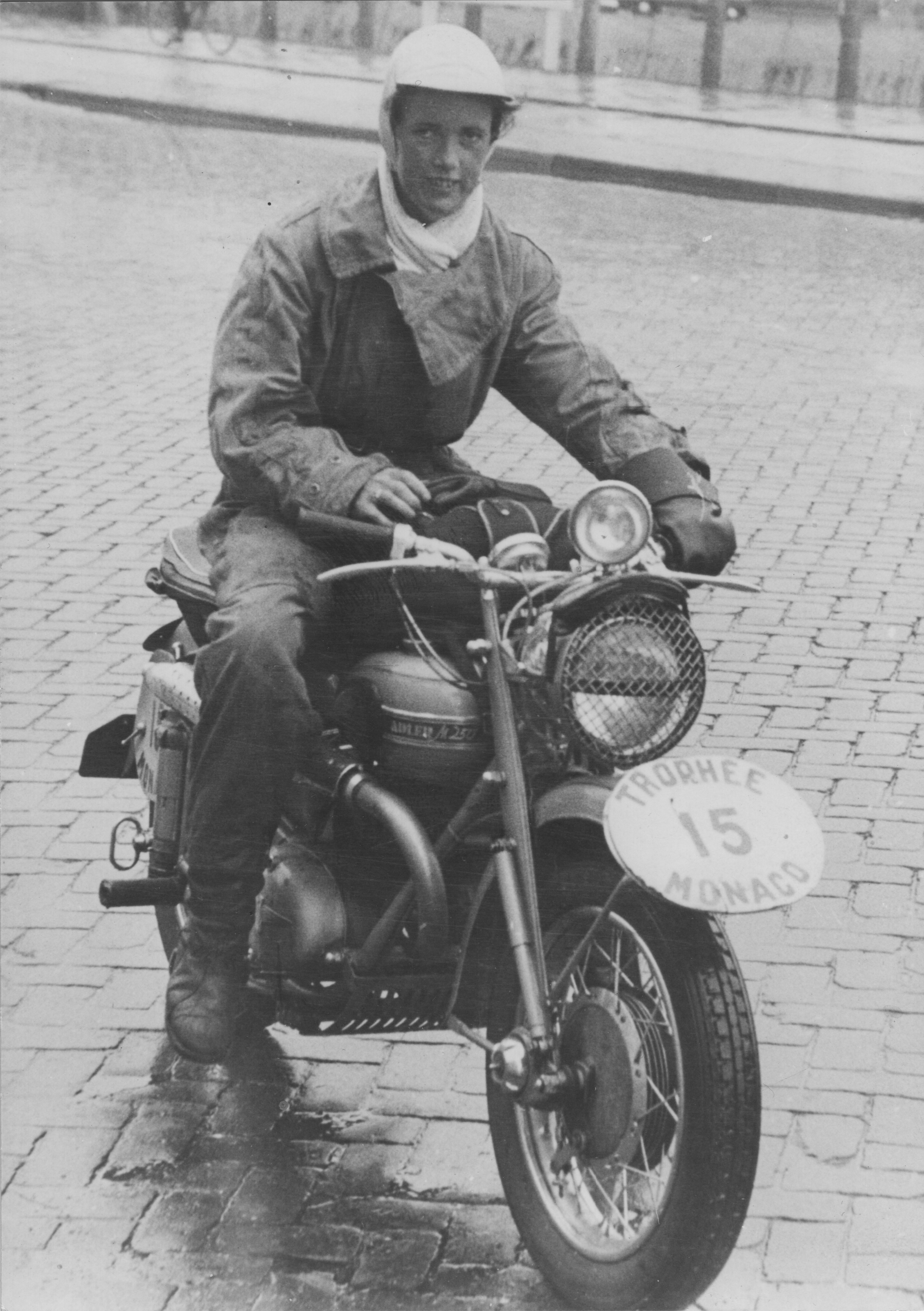
Koppen at the start Trophée de Monaco 1953

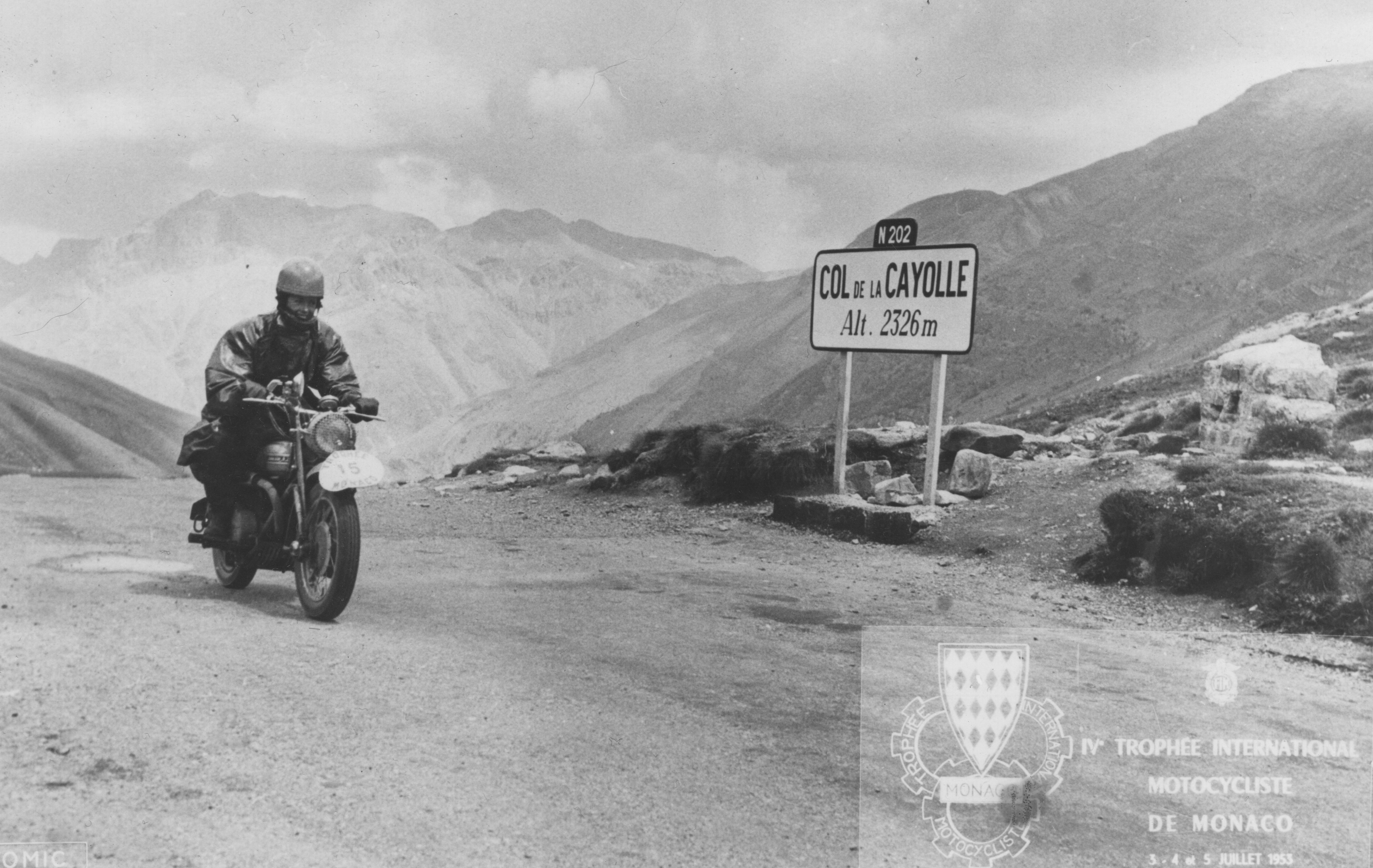
Koppen riding through the Alps during the 1953 Trophée de Monaco

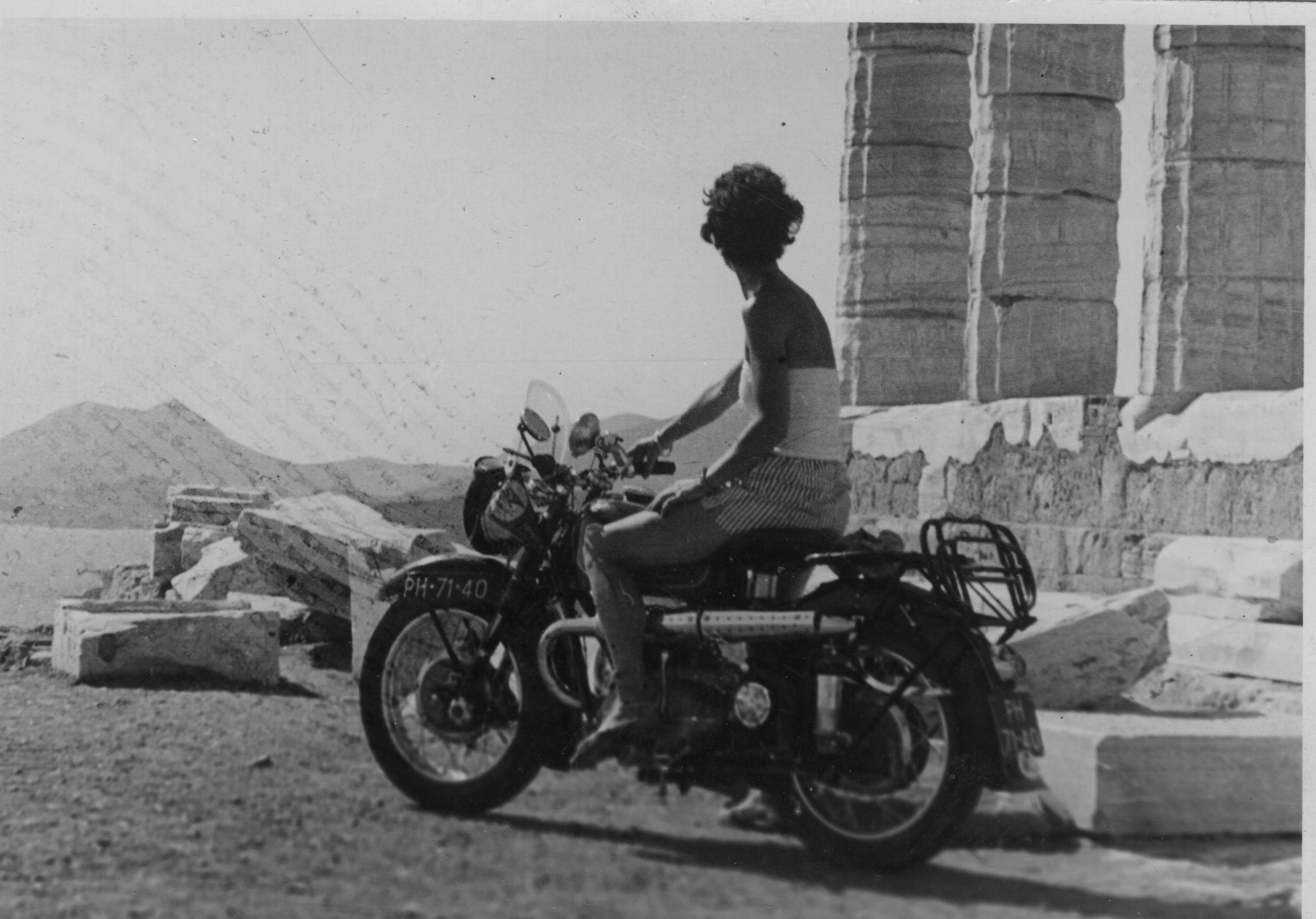
Koppen on the motorcycle at the Acropolis, Greece 1953

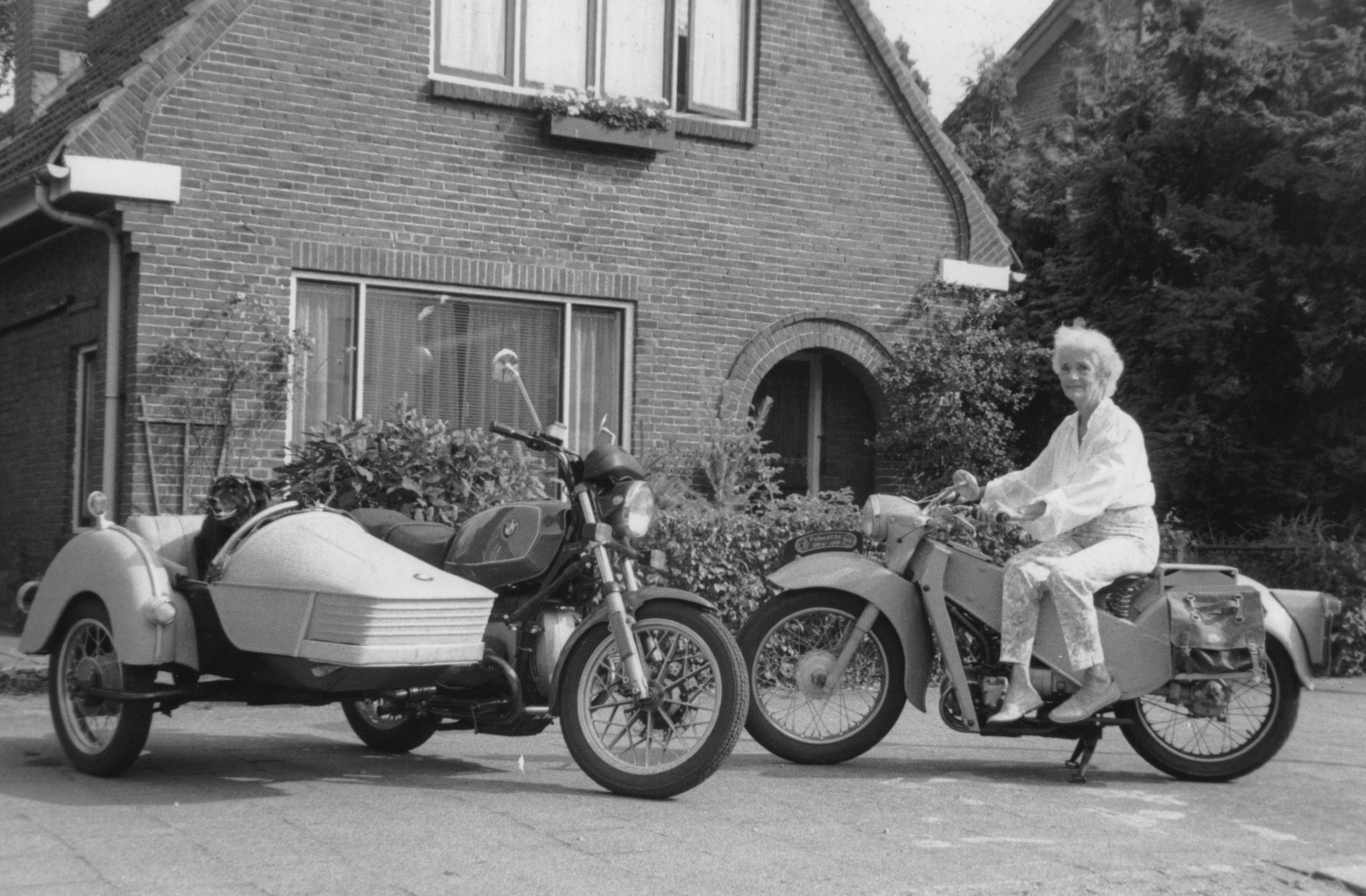
Koppen at her 75th birthday in 1999 with Velocette, BMW 450 with sidecar and dog Dempsey

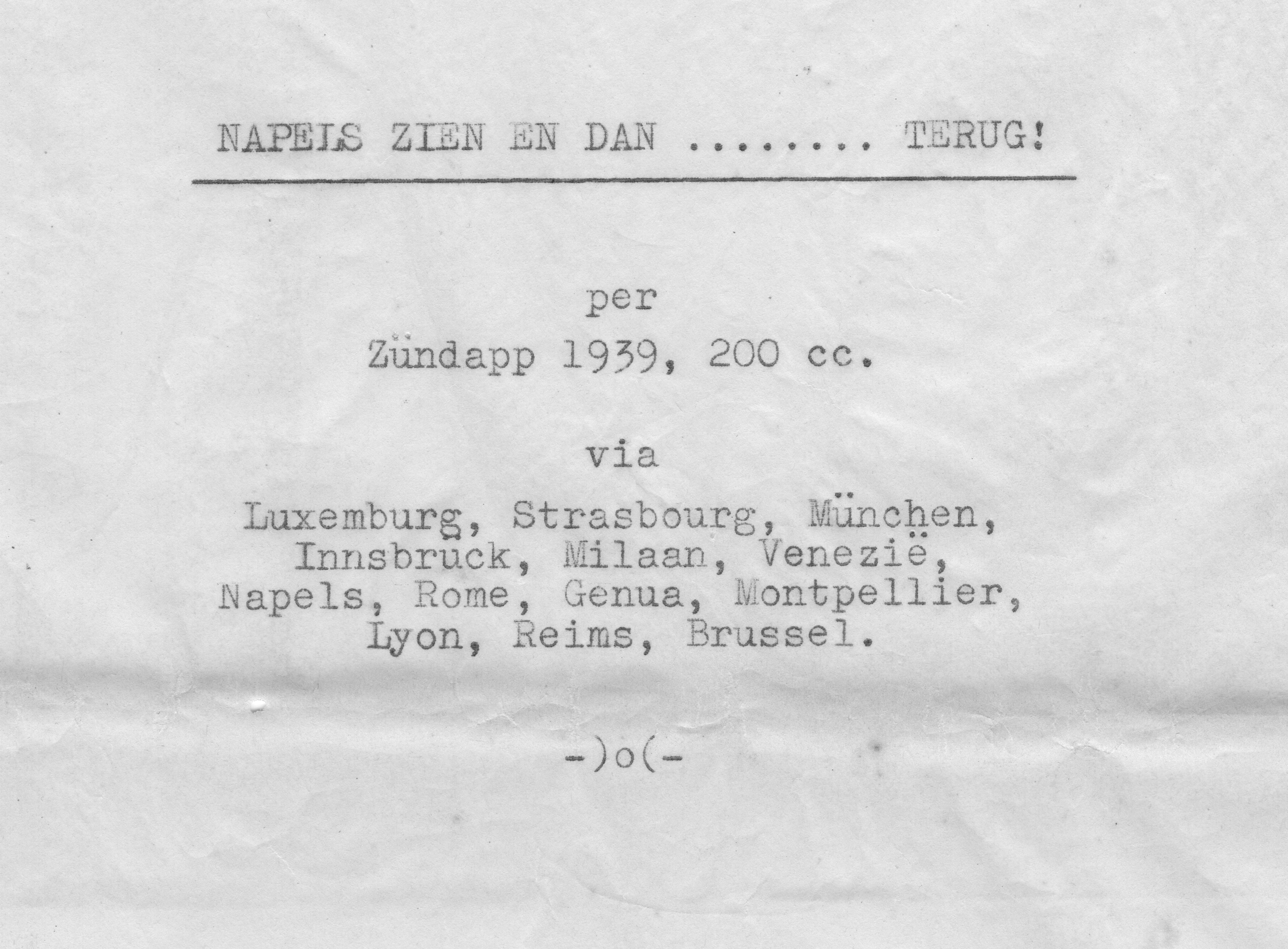
Front page of her travelogue to Naples, signed with her emoji -)o(-

Willy Koppen (7 January 1924 – 22 October 2002) was a Dutch motorcycle racer and one of the first women to participate in international motor races during the 1950s.

== Early years ==
Will Elisabeth Koppen was born on 7 January 1924 in Overveen and raised in a non-motorcycling family. She grew up near the Zandvoort Circuit, where she began riding motorcycles. She held the circuit's "80 star" and rode her new Adler motorcycle at speeds up to 130 km/h. To afford her hobby, Koppen worked as a nurse and secretary during the winter, allowing her to focus entirely on motorsport in the summer.

As a self-taught mechanic, Koppen maintained and adjusted her own engines. She obtained her motorcycle license in 1949, gaining experience by riding a borrowed Saroléa motorcycle across the Netherlands.

In 1950, she bought her first motorcycle, a 1938 Zündapp DB 200, and took her first long-distance trip to Naples. She made another long trip to southern France and Switzerland in 1951, gaining experience in mountain riding.

== Racing career ==
In 1952, Koppen debuted at the FIM Trophée in Madrid, Spain. In 1953, she became the first woman to win the Coupe de Dame at the FIM Trophée de Monaco, a 1,600-kilometre (990 mi) non-stop, 32-hour rally regulated by time, speed, and fuel consumption penalty points. She rode an Adler MB 250 motorcycle. In 1954, she was the only woman to finish the rally, placing ahead of many male competitors.

At both rallies, she competed as a private solo rider without team support. In 1953, she rode a factory Adler MB 250 provided by the manufacturer. Its crankcase protection and overhead exhaust pipes—features of the later Adler MB 250 S—made it suitable for the fast, winding Alpine corners.

She rode her personal Adler MB 250 in 1954. Despite breaking her foot in a motorcycle accident in Italy after the Monaco race, she still competed in the ninth Alpine Rally in Schio.

In 1955, British motorcycle manufacturer Francis-Barnett provided her with a trial enduro bike for rough-terrain competitions. However, the Royal Dutch Motorcyclists Association (KNMV) barred her from road races; as a woman, she was only permitted to ride in junior trials and reliability rides.

== Other motor activities ==
In addition to racing, Koppen became known for her long-distance solo tours across Europe and into Turkey and Israel. Her journeys were covered by Dutch media, including the magazine Motor.

Before her first long journey to Naples, she completely disassembled, reassembled, and adjusted her pre-war Zündapp DB 200 three times.

== Personal life ==
After her racing career, Koppen married and had two children. She returned to motorcycling 25 years later, continuing to ride until her death. She initially rode a Velocette LE and later a BMW R45 with an MZ sidecar, always accompanied by her dog, Dempsey. In 1999, a classic motorcycle race of honour was organized to celebrate her 75th birthday and 50th racing anniversary. She was an honorary member of several motorcycle clubs in Europe.

Koppen died in De Bilt on 22 October 2002, aged 78. On 26 October, her coffin was transported in her MZ sidecar during a tribute parade of antique motorcycles.

== Races ==
Year	Activity	Motorcycle
1952	FIM Trophée San Sebastian, Spain	Zündapp DB 200
1952	FIM Trophée Madrid, Spain	Zündapp DB 200
1953	FIM 4e Trophée de Monaco	Adler MB 250
1954	FIM 5e Trophée de Monaco	Adler MB 250
1954	9e Alps Rally Schio, Italy	Adler MB 250
1955	Trial enduro reliability rides	Francis-Barnett
