= Markus Höttinger =

Austrian racing driver (1956–1980)

- Nationality: Austrian
- Born: 28 May 1956 Neunkirchen, Austria
- Died: 13 April 1980 (aged 23) Heidelberg, West Germany

European Formula Two Championship
- Years active: 1980
- Teams: Maurer Motorsport

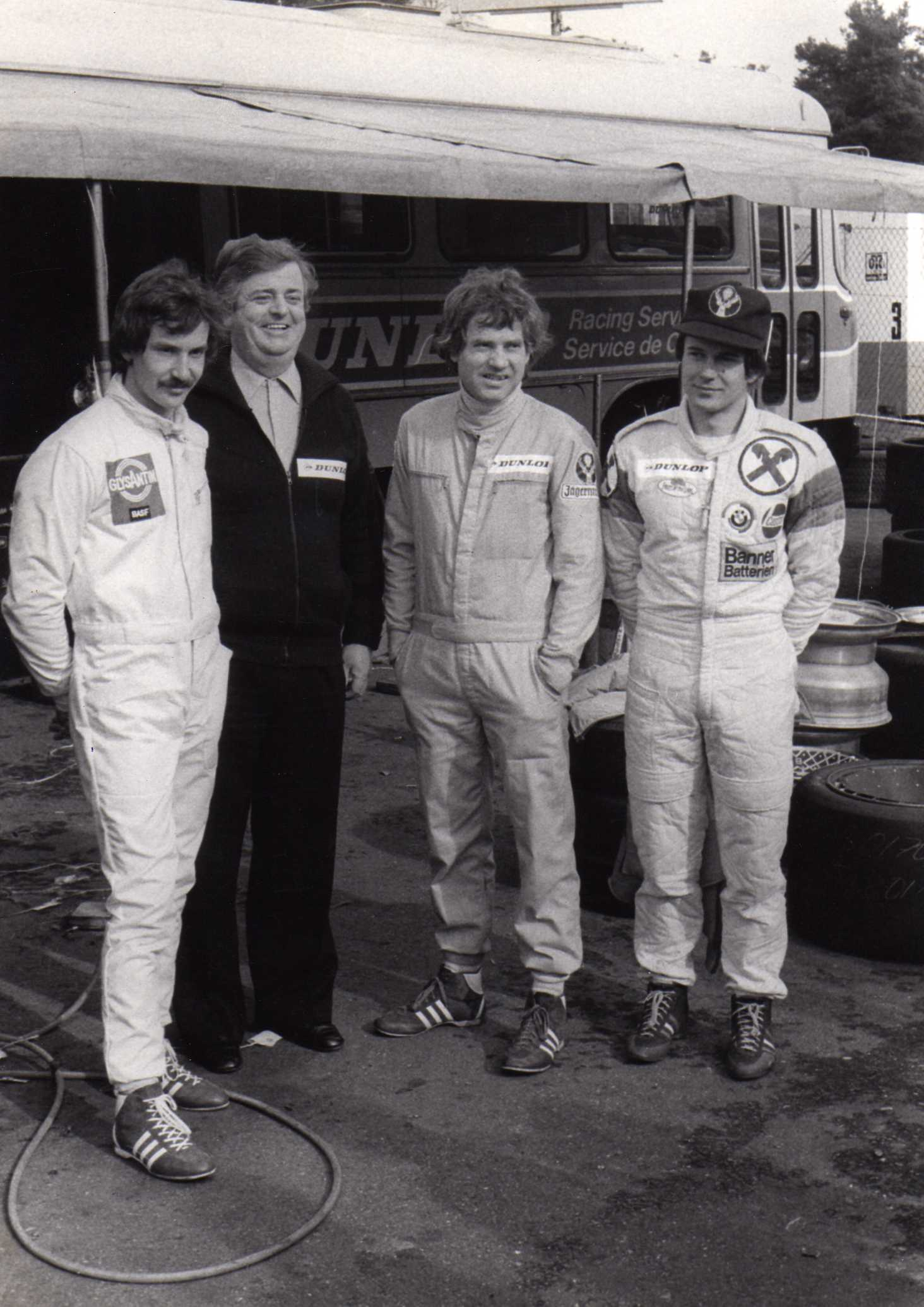
Left to right: GS Tuning team members in 1979 – Hans-Georg Bürger, Gerhard Schneider, Eckhard Schimpf, Markus Höttinger.

Markus Höttinger (28 May 1956 – 13 April 1980) was an Austrian racing driver who died after an accident at Germany's Hockenheimring during the third lap of the second round of the 1980 European Formula Two Championship, on 13 April 1980. He was 23 years old at the time.

== Career ==
Höttinger started his motor sport career with an internship at Mercedes-Benz in 1975, while on a break from studying at university. He subsequently bought a Ford and entered local club races. He graduated to the Austrian Renault 5 Cup, winning in his second season in 1977. He met established Austrian racer Helmut Marko, who helped Höttinger on his way through the lower categories of the sport. Via Marko, Höttinger was given a drive by BMW team principal Jochen Neerpasch in the 1977 Kyalami 1000kms alongside Harald Grohs, and the pair finished third.

Neerpasch gave Höttinger a test and development role at BMW for 1978, and also a race seat with GS Tuning in the DRM series. Good performances led to appearances in the World Championship for Makes paired with Hans-Joachim Stuck, and the European Touring Car Championship. He also made his debut in single seaters, in Formula Three.

In 1979, Höttinger continued under the guidance of BMW in DRM, Formula Two and also the new BMW M1 Procar Championship, again with the GS Tuning team. His impressive Procar season raised his profile more widely, as he finished fourth behind Formula One drivers Niki Lauda, Stuck, and Clay Regazzoni. He also took part in five Formula Two Championship events, finishing seventh on three occasions in an unfamiliar car, a March 792.

Höttinger was to undertake a full season of Formula Two in 1980, driving Maurer's new MM80 with its BMW engine. His team mate was the experienced Swedish driver Eje Elgh. After both cars retired from the opening round at Thruxton, Höttinger and Elgh qualified further up the grid for the next race at Hockenheim, and were running in the top ten when Höttinger was killed in a freak accident. On the second lap, Andrea de Cesaris and Manfred Winkelhock collided, spreading sand on to the circuit. On lap three, Derek Warwick spun on the sand and crashed into the barriers. The right rear wheel was ripped off Warwick's Toleman, and hit Höttinger on the head as he drove past. Höttinger spun and was hit by the March of Irish driver Bernard Devaney before stopping at a guard rail 300m further down the track. Despite swift medical assistance and attention in a trackside ambulance, Höttinger was pronounced dead on his arrival by helicopter at a hospital in Heidelberg. The incident was similar to Henry Surtees' fatal accident in Formula Two at Brands Hatch in 2009.

Höttinger was due to drive in the 1980 Austrian Grand Prix later that year, probably for the ATS team. His Formula Two rival and friend Hans-Georg Bürger was killed at the Dutch round of the championship, and Helmut Marko has stated his belief that both drivers would have reached Formula One and been competitive.
