= BMW M1 Procar Championship =

One-make auto racing series created by Jochen Neerpasch

- Category: One-make series
- Country: Europe
- Inaugural season: 1979
- Folded: 1980
- Drivers: Varied
- Teams: Varied
- Constructors: BMW
- Last Drivers' champion: (Brazil) Nelson Piquet

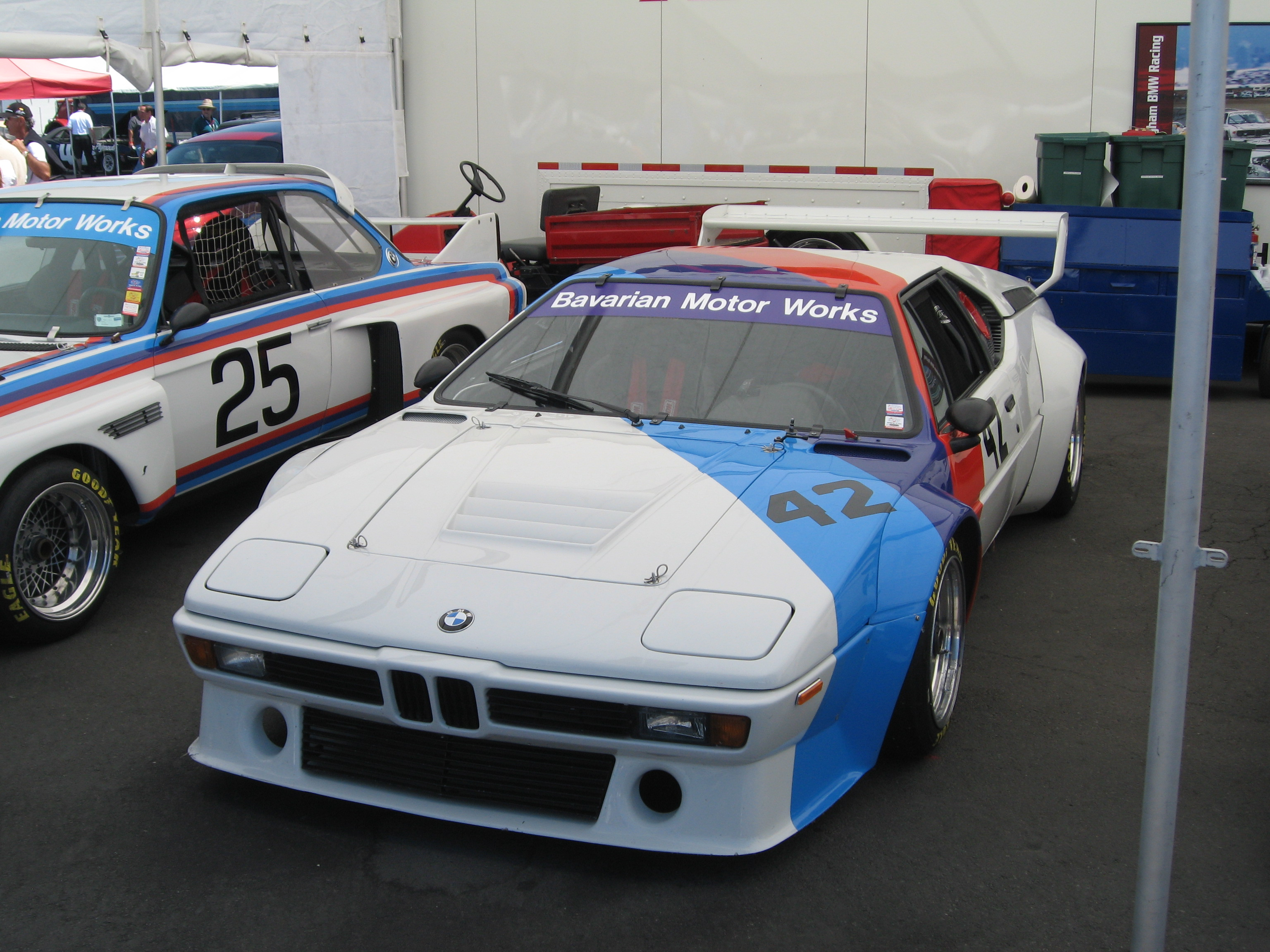
A Procar BMW M1, painted in the colour scheme used by BMW Motorsport

The BMW M1 Procar Championship, sometimes known simply as Procar, was a one-make auto racing series which featured professional drivers from the Formula One World Championship, World Sportscar Championship, European Touring Car Championship, and other international series, using identically modified BMW M1 sports cars. It was created by Jochen Neerpasch, head of BMW Motorsport GmbH, the racing division of automobile manufacturer BMW.

Billed as an opportunity to see a mix of drivers from various motorsport disciplines, the championship served as support races for various European rounds of the 1979 Formula One season, with Formula One drivers earning automatic entry into the Procar event based on their performance in their Formula One cars. Austrian Niki Lauda won the inaugural championship. In 1980, the series held some events outside of Formula One schedule, and was won by Brazilian Nelson Piquet. BMW chose not to continue the championship in 1981 to concentrate on their entrance into Formula One.

== Origin ==
Jochen Neerpasch, the head of BMW's Motorsports division, was the first to propose the idea of a one-make championship. The division had started construction of the first sports car for BMW in 1978, the M1, and had planned from the start to enter the new sports car in the World Sportscar Championship in 1979, as well as offering the cars to customers for other series. BMW Motorsport planned to build M1s to meet regulations known as Group 5, but a rule change instituted by the Fédération Internationale du Sport Automobile (FISA) in 1977 altered the requirements for Group 5. The new regulations required a minimum of 400 examples of the M1 to be built to meet Group 4 regulations before the car could be further homologated for the Group 5 category.

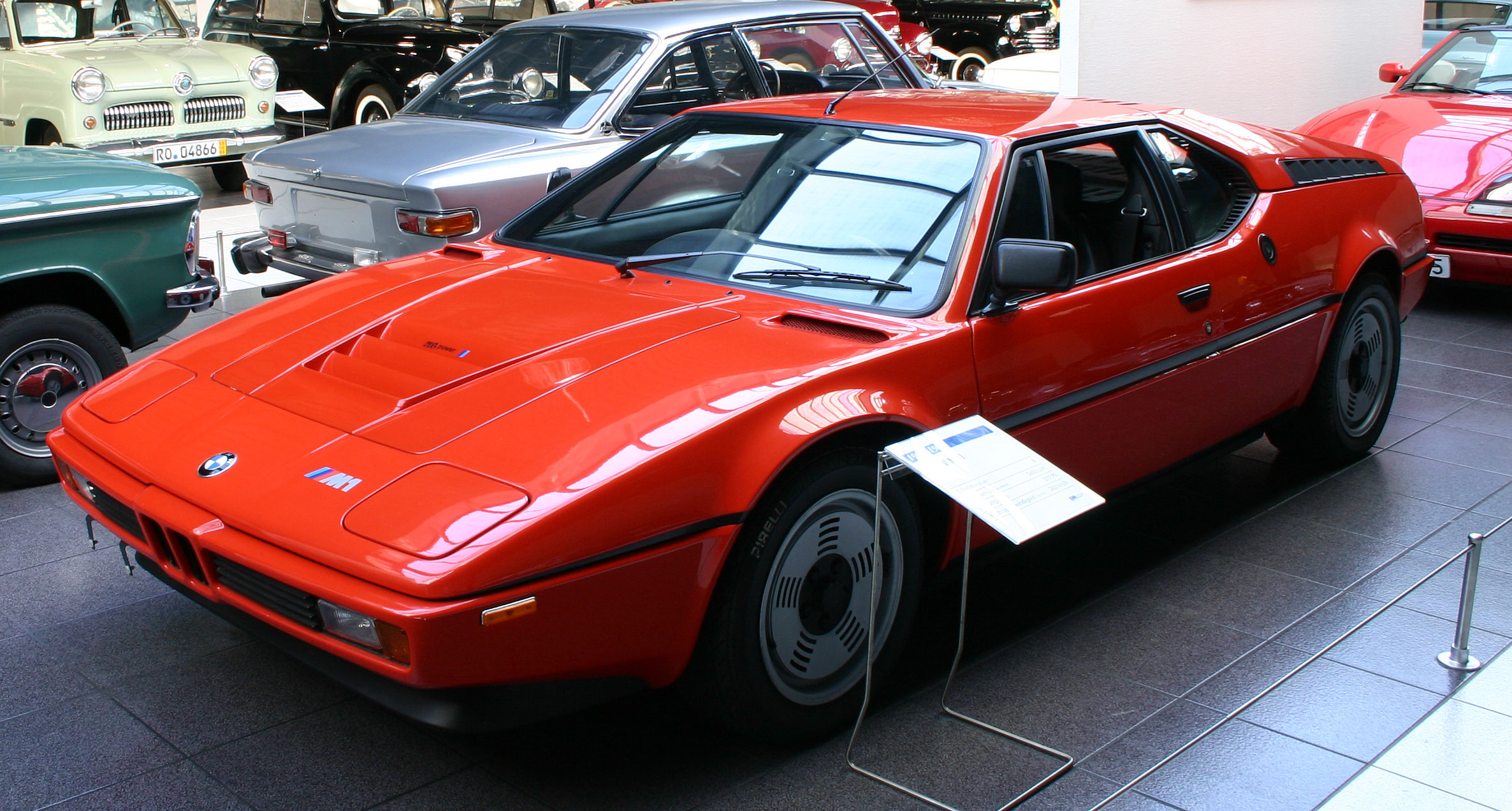
The BMW M1 road car

Development of the Group 4 racing car was already under way at the time of the regulation change. Neerpasch believed that rather than delaying their racing program until 400 road cars had been built, racing cars could be built at the same time since they too counted toward the 400 example minimum. A one-make series consisting of the M1 racing cars intended for Group 4 was devised by Neerpasch since the racing cars could not yet legally compete elsewhere, while at the same time allowing BMW to develop the race cars through experience.

To attract drivers to the series, Neerpasch entered into discussions with Max Mosley. Mosley was the head of March Engineering, a constructor which BMW was partnered with in their factory efforts in the European Formula Two Championship. Mosley was at the time a member of the Formula One Constructors Association, and was able to use his position to convince other Formula One constructors to support the use of Neerpasch's one-make series as a support race for European Formula One events. A ruling and organisation body for the series, known as The Procar Association, was set up by BMW and approved by FISA.

== Format ==
With the Procar Championship announced in spring 1978 at the official unveiling of the M1 road car, Neerpasch and the newly formed Procar Association laid out regulations for the 1979 season. Races were planned for the middle of the Formula One season, when the championship remained in Europe for several months. Practice and qualifying were held on Friday of the race weekend, while the race itself occurred on Saturday. The winner of each race received US $5,000, second place received $3,000, and third place $1,000. Races varied in length, but each lasted for approximately half an hour.

To attract Formula One drivers to the championship, seats were guaranteed in the Procar races by cars which were entered by the factory BMW team. The five fastest Formula One drivers from Friday practice were assigned to the factory team, and were even guaranteed the first five grid positions for the Procar race, regardless of their qualifying times in the cars. This not only guaranteed Formula One driver participation, but also allowed for a variety of drivers to be seen over the course of the season. However, because the series ran Goodyear tyres, several Formula One drivers were not allowed to compete due to contractual obligations with competing tyre manufacturer Michelin. As Scuderia Ferrari and Renault were selling roadcars themselves, they did not allow their Formula One drivers to participate and implicitly endorse BMW.

Other teams were allowed to participate, assigning a variety of sportscar and touring car drivers as well as Formula One drivers who had not earned spots in the factory cars. Points were awarded to the top ten finishers, starting with 20 points and decreasing down to 15, 12, 10, 8, 6, 4, 3, 2, and finally 1 for the nine remaining drivers. An overall championship was awarded to the driver who had accumulated the most points at the end of the season. A new M1 road car was awarded to the championship winner.

=== Cars ===
All cars used in the Procar Championship were built to identical standards, although their origins varied. BS Fabrications constructed five cars for the BMW factory team, while cars for other competitors were constructed by the British Formula Two team Project Four Racing (led by Ron Dennis) and the Italian constructor Osella. The racing cars, designed to meet Group 4 technical regulations, shared only some basics from the M1 road cars.

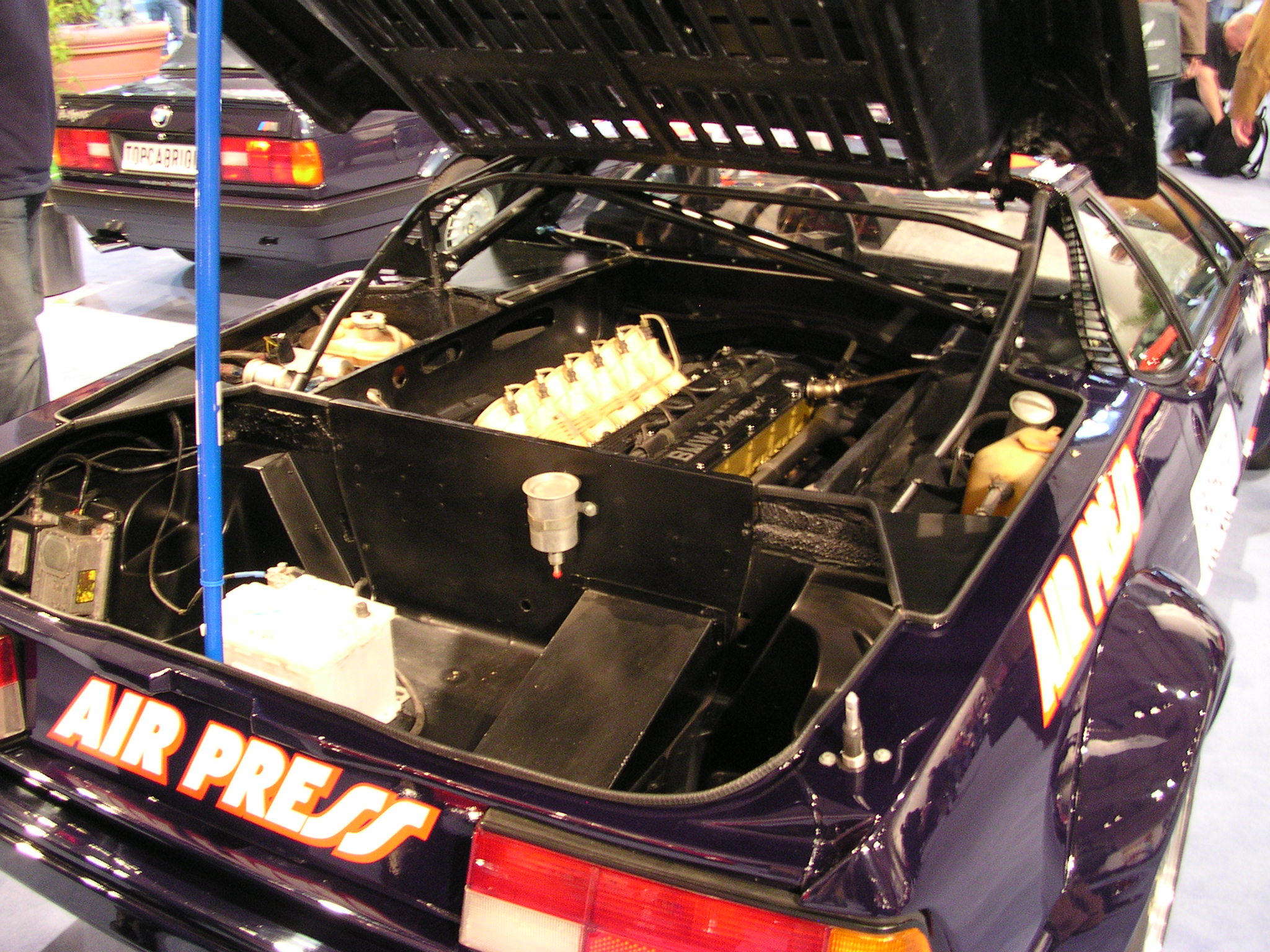
The engine bay of a Procar M1. The M88/1 engine is a heavily tuned variant of the road car's M88 straight-6.

For the M1's exterior, simple modifications were made to adapt the car aerodynamically. A deep spoiler was added under the nose of the car, while an adjustable wing was added on two mounts at the rear of the engine cover. The arches for the wheels were extended outward to shroud the wider 28 centimetres (11 in) wheels in the front, and 32 cm (12.6 in) wheels at the rear. The alloy wheels, designed by Campagnolo, featured a central locking nut and mimicked the straked design of the production car's wheels. Inside, the car featured no finishing or luxuries from the road car, only a rollcage for driver protection. The glass windows were replaced with clear plastic.

Mechanically, the Procar M1s were extensively modified to meet the requirements of circuit racing. The standard M1 featured the cast iron block BMW M88 straight-6 with 3,453 cubic centimetres (210.7 cu in) displacement. Modified into the M88/1 by a team led by Paul Rosche, it was capable of producing 470 horsepower at 9000 rpm, compared to 277 hp from the standard M1's engine. The 5-speed ZF gearbox housing from the road car was retained, but with multiple gear ratios allowed, as well as its own oil cooler.

The suspension was entirely new, adding adjustable anti-roll bars. The brakes were redesigned to adapt the use of a driver-adjustable brake pressure balance, while the servo-activated braking system was removed. A racing steering rack was used in place of the standard power steering unit. Pneumatic jacks were later added to the cars in the 1980 season to allow for quicker pit stops. Goodyear racing tires were used on all cars. All other non-essential items from the road car were not included, bringing the Procar M1's weight down to 1,020 kilograms (2,250 lb). The performance of the Procar M1s was increased to a top speed of 311 kilometres per hour (193 mph) dependent upon gear ratios, and acceleration from 0–100 km/h (62 mph) in 4.3 seconds. Each Procar M1 cost approximately US $60,000.

== Series history ==
=== 1979 season ===
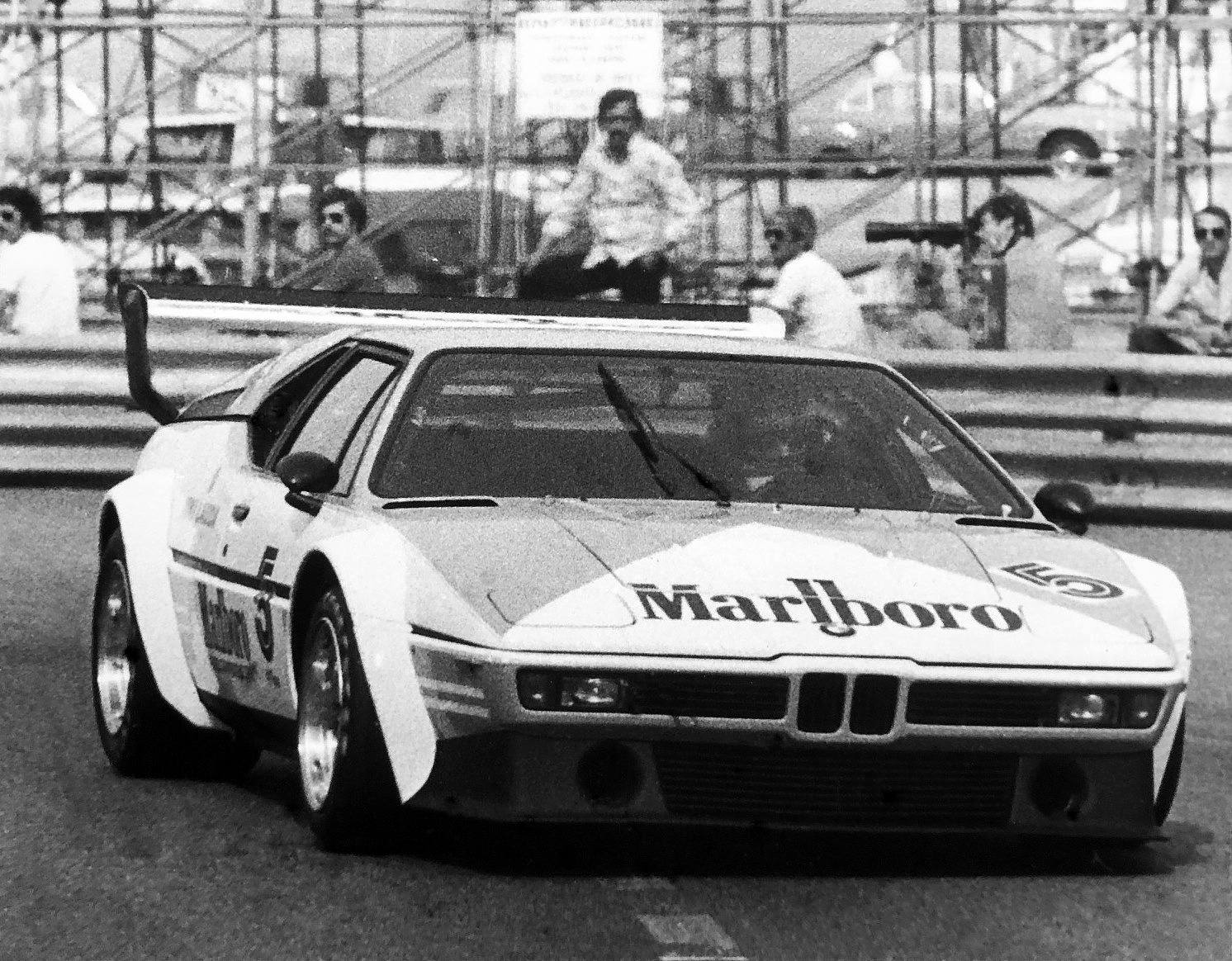
Niki Lauda in 1979 Monaco race.

An announced schedule for the inaugural season of the Procar Championship featured events taking place from May to September, when the Formula One World Championship ran eight consecutive Grands Prix in Europe. A ninth event was scheduled at Donington Park as part of the Gunnar Nilsson Memorial Trophy, a charity event for the Gunnar Nilsson Cancer Fund, although it did not award points towards the overall championship.

Different Formula One drivers earned spots on the factory team over the season based on their performance in Formula One practice. These included Mario Andretti, Patrick Depailler, Emerson Fittipaldi, James Hunt, Jean-Pierre Jarier, Alan Jones, Jacques Laffite, Niki Lauda, Nelson Piquet, Didier Pironi, Clay Regazzoni, and John Watson. Teo Fabi, Tiff Needell, Hans-Georg Bürger and Michael Bleekemolen were invited to drive in the factory BMW cars as well although they were not Formula One drivers at the time.

As well as the standard five car entry from BMW, several other notable teams participated. Procar constructor Project Four entered a car for Niki Lauda when he was not in the factory entries, while Osella entered cars for a rotating driver line-up. Touring car teams Tom Walkinshaw Racing, Eggenberger Racing, Ecurie Arvor, and Schnitzer Motorsport entered cars, as did Team Konrad and GS Tuning from sports cars.

=== 1980 season ===
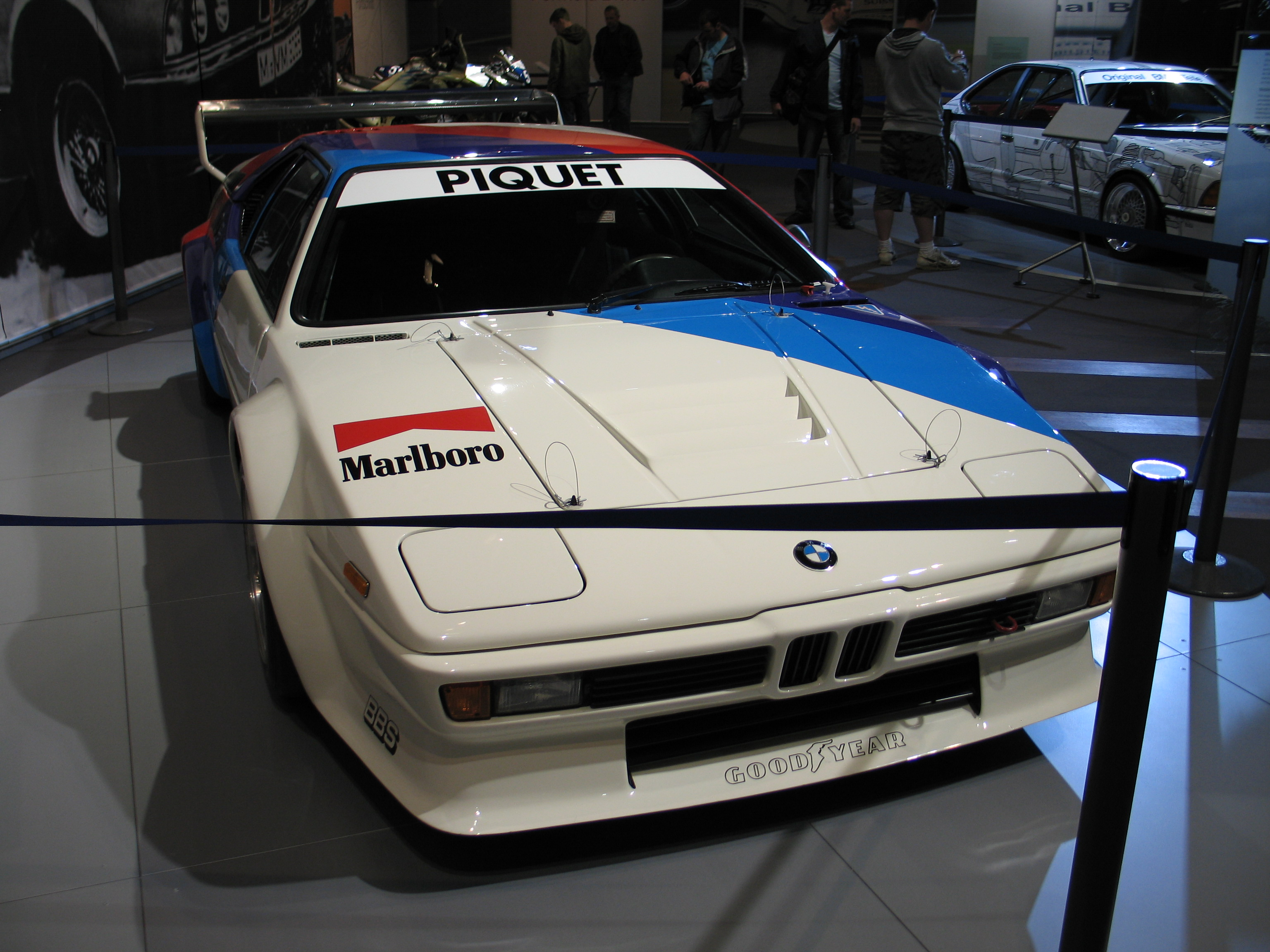
A Procar BMW M1 driven by 1980 champion Nelson Piquet

For the second running of the Procar Championship, the schedule was altered and expanded so that the races did not rely exclusively on Formula One events. This allowed the season to start slightly earlier, this time in April. Donington Park was retained from the previous year but now counted towards the championship. Two German events were added, with the Procar Championship designated as that year's Avusrennen at the AVUS circuit, and the Procars serving as a support race for the Deutsche Rennsport Meisterschaft's 200 Miles of Norisring. Six Formula One Grands Prix remained on the schedule.

Unlike the previous year where the fastest drivers in practice earned seats with the factory BMW team, five drivers were designated as the primary drivers for events which did not share a Grand Prix weekend. These five were Alan Jones, Jacques Laffite, Nelson Piquet, Didier Pironi, and Carlos Reutemann. Other Formula One drivers to participate during Grands Prix were Mario Andretti, Derek Daly, Jean-Pierre Jarier, Riccardo Patrese, and Alain Prost.

Several teams from the previous year entered once more, including Project Four, GS Tuning, Eggenberger Racing, Cassani Racing, and Schnitzer Motorsport. Newcomers included personal teams from Arturo Merzario, Dieter Quester, and Helmut Marko, as well as Swiss sportscar manufacturer Sauber.

== Afterwards ==
At the start of the 1980 season, BMW announced their intention to enter Formula One as an engine supplier for Brabham. The deal came in part due to Bernie Ecclestone, then head of Brabham, as well as the head of BS Fabrications, who had built several of the Procar M1s. BMW planned to enter the series in 1982, and BMW Motorsport was tasked with concentrating their efforts on the new Formula One engines instead of the Procar series.

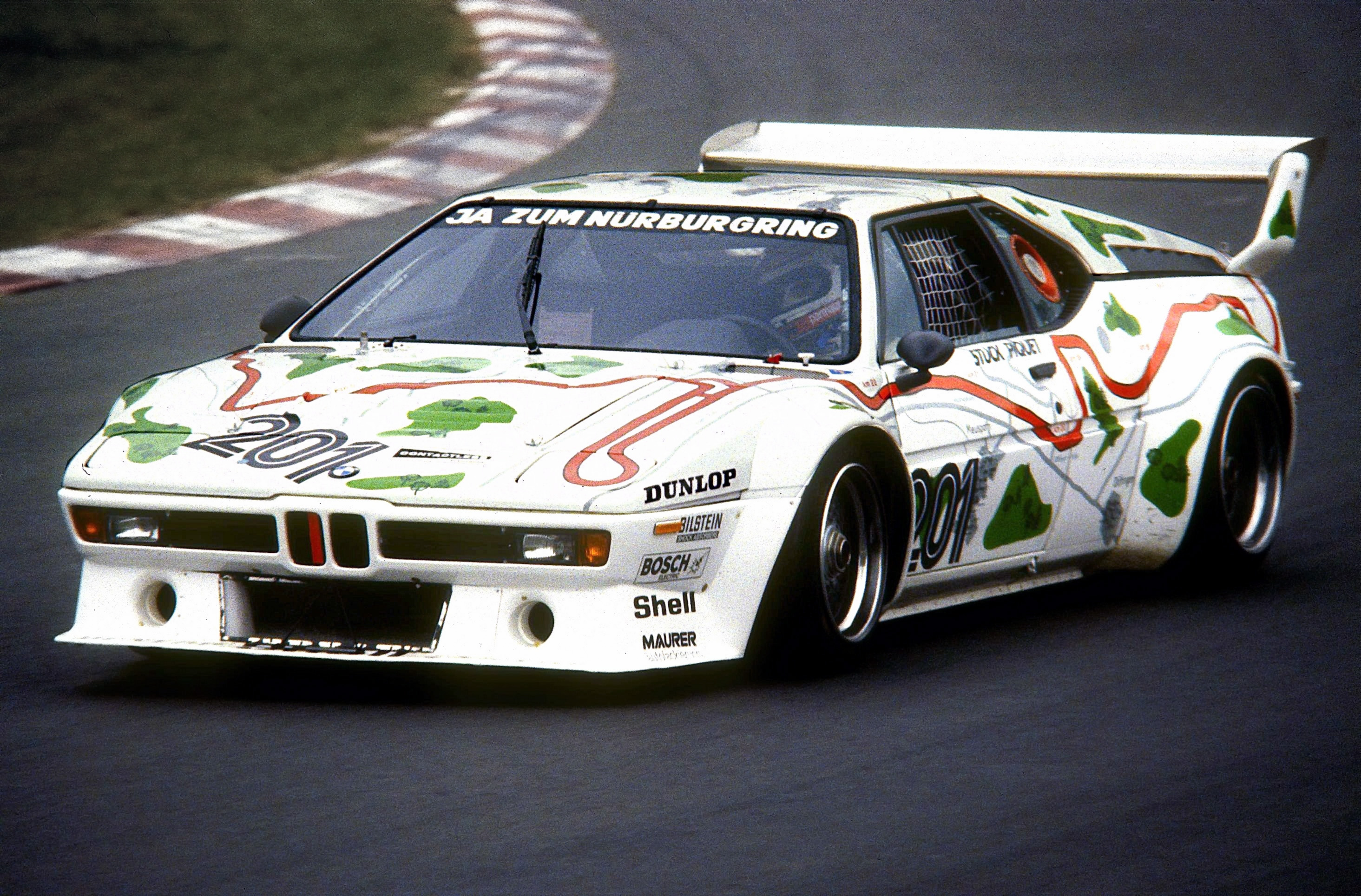
A Group 4 M1 competing in the 1000 Kilometres of Nürburgring. Procar veterans Hans-Joachim Stuck and Nelson Piquet shared the car.

That same year, BMW officially met FISA's requirements by having built approximately 400 cars. The M1 was therefore homologated for Group 4 on December 1, 1980, allowing BMW to enter the Championship for Makes in 1981. As BMW shifted towards Formula One, the company ended their plans to enter the Group 5 category after the construction of only two race cars. With BMW no longer needing to quickly build race cars, and with BMW Motorsport shifting to Formula One work, the series was not held in 1981. The M1s used in the Procar series were sold to various customers for use in the World Championship, as well as smaller series such as the Deutsche Rennsport Meisterschaft and Camel GT Championship.

In 1988, Motor Racing Developments, the owners of the Brabham Formula One Team, were sold to Alfa Romeo. Wishing to revive the Procar series, Brabham and Alfa Romeo developed a prototype racing car using a mid-mounted Formula One-based V10 engine, covered in a bodywork silhouette mimicking the Alfa Romeo 164. Alfa Romeo intended to use identical copies of the car for a resurrected Procar series, but the plans never came to fruition and only the prototype was built.

=== Revival ===
On June 30, 2008, BMW announced plans to revive the Procar series in an exhibition event at the 2008 German Grand Prix at the Hockenheimring. The races involved ten original M1 Procars driven by several drivers who had participated in the original series as well as modern drivers. Each car included a passenger seat for a guest. The line-up included former competitors Christian Danner, Harald Grohs, Niki Lauda, Dieter Quester, and Marc Surer. Former BMW driver Prince Leopold of Bavaria, BMW Sauber test driver Christian Klien, and a current M1 Procar owner, Marco Wagner, also competed. The BMW M1 Art Car designed by Andy Warhol was involved, driven by series founder Jochen Neerpasch and with fellow Art Car artist Frank Stella as his passenger.

Lauda won the first race held on Saturday, July 19, while Neerpasch was able to win the race held on Sunday, July 20, the morning of the Grand Prix.

== See also ==
- BMW in motorsport
