= 1978 World Championship for Makes =

Racing tournament

1978 World Sportscar Championship

Seasons
- ← 1977 1979 →

The 1978 World Sportscar Championship season was the 26th season of FIA World Sportscar Championship motor racing. It featured the 1978 World Championship for Makes, which was contested from 4 February to 3 September 1978 over an eight race series. The 24 Hours of Daytona and the 1000 km Nürburgring were part of the inaugural FIA World Challenge for Endurance Drivers.

The championship was open to cars in Groups 1 to 5, i.e.:

- Group 1 Series Touring Cars
- Group 2 Touring Cars
- Group 3 Series Grand Touring Cars
- Group 4 Grand Touring Cars
- Group 5 Special Production Cars

Porsche was awarded the overall championship and the Division 2 title for cars with an engine capacity of over 2 litres. BMW was awarded the Division 1 title for cars with an engine capacity of up to 2 litres and Porsche won the GT Cup.

== Schedule ==
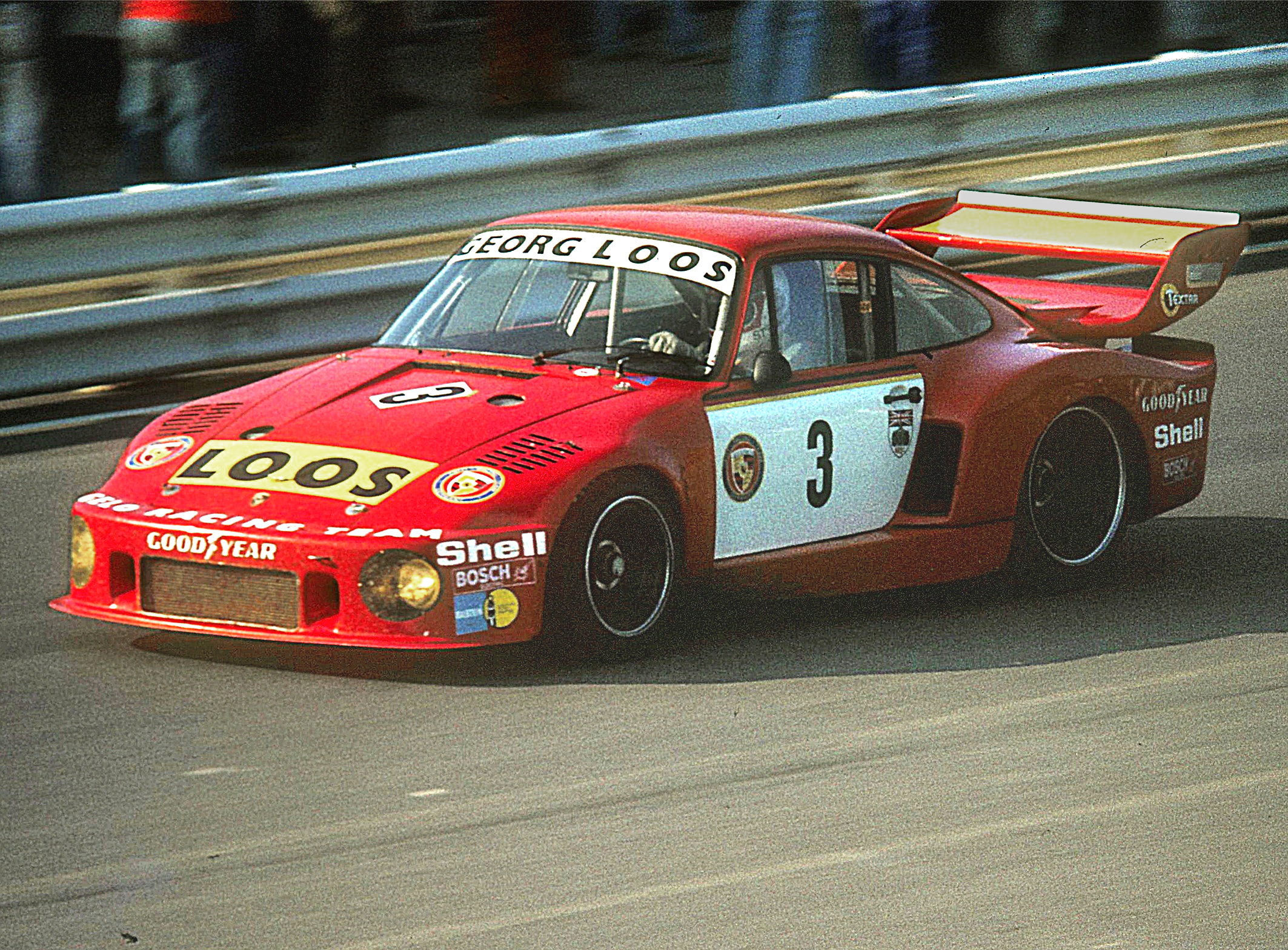
Porsche won the championship with their 935 model (pictured in 1977)

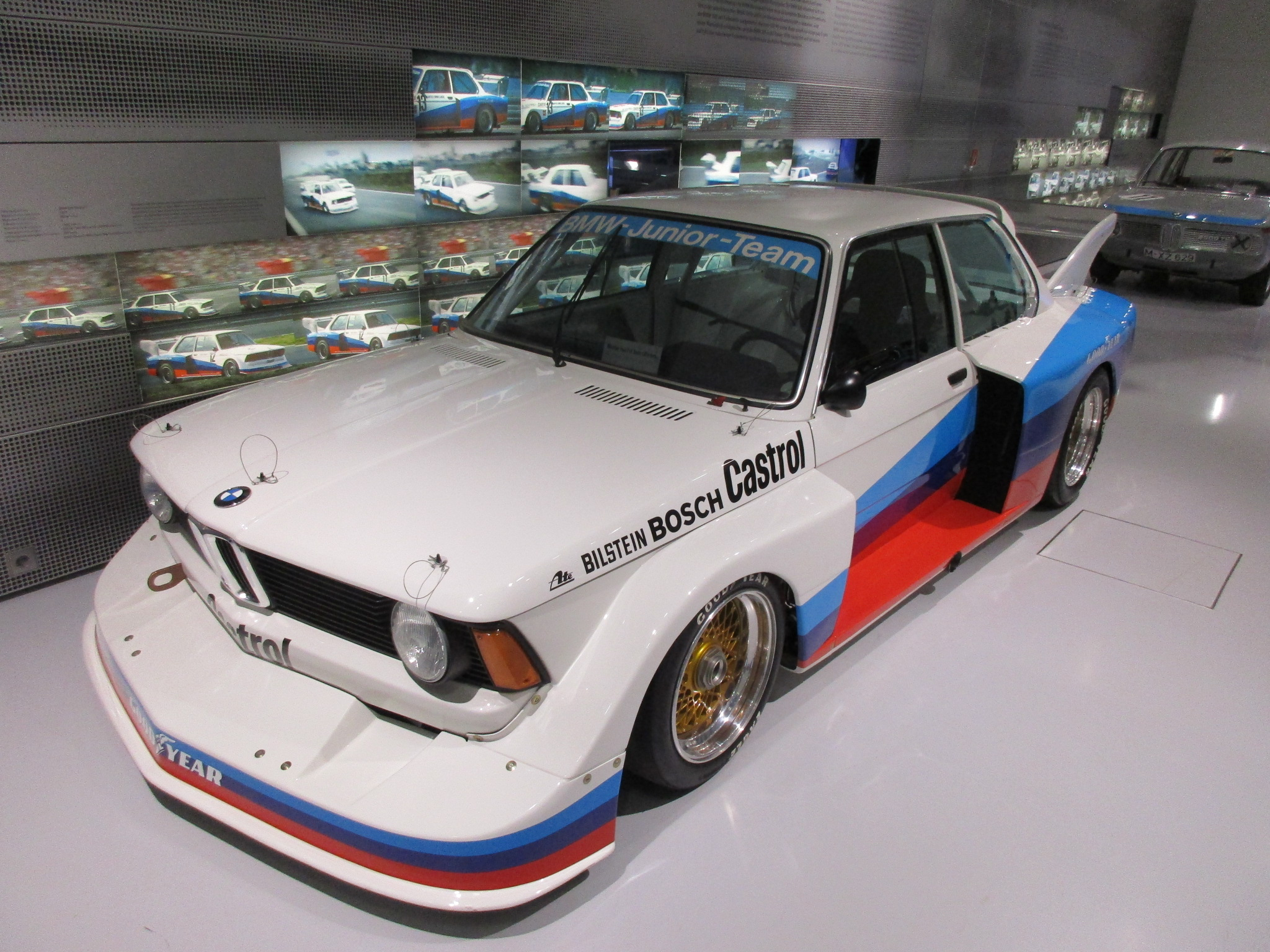
BMW placed first in Division 1 with the 320i

Rnd	Race name	Circuit	Date
1	(United States) 24 Hours of Daytona	Daytona International Speedway	4 February; 5 February
2	(Italy) 6 Hours of Mugello	Mugello Circuit	19 March
3	(France) 6 Hours of Dijon	Dijon-Prenois	16 April
4	(United Kingdom) 6 Hours of Silverstone	Silverstone Circuit	14 May
5	(Germany) 1000km Nürburgring	Nürburgring	28 May
6	(Italy) Misano 6 Hours	Misano Circuit	25 June
7	(United States) Watkins Glen 6 Hours	Watkins Glen International	8 July
8	(Italy) 6 Hours of Vallelunga	Vallelunga	3 September

== Round results ==
Rnd	Circuit	Over 2.0 Winning Team	Under 2.0 Winning Team	GT Cup Winning Team	Results
Rnd	Circuit	Over 2.0 Winning Drivers	Under 2.0 Winning Drivers	GT Cup Winning Drivers	Results
Rnd	Circuit	Over 2.0 Winning Car	Under 2.0 Winning Car	GT Cup Winning Car	Results
1	Daytona	(United States) #99 Brumos Porsche	None	None	Results
1	Daytona	(United States) Peter Gregg (Germany) Rolf Stommelen (Netherlands) Toine Hezemans	None	None	Results
1	Daytona	(Germany) Porsche 935-77A	None	None	Results
2	Mugello	(Germany) #12 Gelo Racing Team	(Germany) #31 Faltz Preparation	(Italy) #4 Jolly Club	Results
2	Mugello	(Germany) Hans Heyer (Netherlands) Toine Hezemans (United Kingdom) John Fitzpatrick	(Austria) Dieter Quester (United Kingdom) Derek Bell	(Italy) Fulvio Bacchelli (Italy) Claudio Magnani	Results
2	Mugello	(Germany) Porsche 935-77A	(Germany) BMW 320i	(Italy) Lancia Stratos	Results
3	Dijon	(Germany) #2 Porsche Kremer Racing	(Italy) #21 BMW Italia-Osella	#31 Meccarillos Racing Team	Results
3	Dijon	(France) Bob Wollek (France) Henri Pescarolo	(Italy) Giorgio Francia (United States) Eddie Cheever	(Switzerland) Angelo Pallavicini (Switzerland) Peter Bernhard (Switzerland) Enzo Calderari	Results
3	Dijon	(Germany) Porsche 935-77A	(Germany) BMW 320i	(Germany) Porsche 934	Results
4	Silverstone	(Germany) #1 Martini Racing	#53 BMW Belgium	#25 Wrangler Racing Team	Results
4	Silverstone	(Germany) Jochen Mass (Belgium) Jacky Ickx	(Germany) Harald Grohs (Belgium) Eddy Joosen	(Germany) Eberhard Sindel (Denmark) Preben Kristoffersen	Results
4	Silverstone	(Germany) Porsche 935-78	(Germany) BMW 320i	(Germany) Porsche 934	Results
5	Nürburgring	(Germany) #3 Gelo Racing Team	(Germany) #34 BMW Motorsport GmbH	#48 Norddeutscher Automobilclub	Results
5	Nürburgring	(Germany) Hans Heyer (Germany) Klaus Ludwig (Netherlands) Toine Hezemans	(Germany) Hans-Joachim Stuck (Austria) Markus Höttinger	(Germany) Gerhard Happel (Germany) Götz von Tschirnhaus	Results
5	Nürburgring	(Germany) Porsche 935-77A	(Germany) BMW 320i	(Germany) Porsche Carrera RSR	Results
6	Misano	(Germany) #7 Porsche Kremer Racing	#2 BMW Belgium	#18 Angelo Pallavicini	Results
6	Misano	(France) Bob Wollek (France) Henri Pescarolo	(Germany) Harald Grohs (Belgium) Patrick Nève	(Switzerland) Angelo Pallavicini (Switzerland) Edi Kofel (Switzerland) Marco Vanoli	Results
6	Misano	(Germany) Porsche 935-77A	(Germany) BMW 320i	(Germany) Porsche 934	Results
7	Watkins Glen	(Germany) #30 Gelo Racing Team	(Germany) #10 BMW Faltz	(United States) #29 Billy J. Hagan	Results
7	Watkins Glen	(United States) Peter Gregg (Netherlands) Toine Hezemans (United Kingdom) John Fitzpatrick	(Germany) Hans-Joachim Stuck (Austria) Dieter Quester	(United States) Hoyt Overbagh (United States) Billy Hagan	Results
7	Watkins Glen	(Germany) Porsche 935-77A	(Germany) BMW 320i	(United States) Chevrolet Monza 350	Results
8	Vallelunga	(Germany) #3 Porsche Kremer Racing	(Switzerland) #34 BMW Schweiz	(Switzerland) #12 Angelo Pallavicini	Results
8	Vallelunga	(France) Bob Wollek (France) Henri Pescarolo	(Switzerland) Marc Surer (Sweden) Freddy Kottulinsky	(Switzerland) Angelo Pallavicini (Switzerland) Marco Vanoli	Results
8	Vallelunga	(Germany) Porsche 935-77A	(Germany) BMW 320i	(Germany) Porsche 934	Results

== Points system ==
Points were awarded to the top 10 finishers in each division on a 20-15-12-10-8-6-4-3-2-1 basis. Manufacturers were only allocated points for their highest finishing car with no points awarded for positions filled by any other car from that manufacturer.

Only the best six points finishes could be retained towards the championship, with any other points earned not included in the total.

== Championship results ==
The overall championship was awarded to the winner of Division 2 (Over 2000cc), Porsche thus scoring their third straight World Championship for Makes victory.

=== Division 1 (Up to 2000cc) ===
Position	Manufacturer	Total
1	BMW	120
2	Porsche	12
3	Fiat	10
4	Alpine	8
5	Volkswagen	6
6	Ford	4

=== Division 2 (Over 2000cc) ===
Position	Manufacturer	Total
1	Porsche	120
2	De Tomaso	8
3	Chevrolet	4
4	Ferrari	3
=	Lancia	3

=== GT Cup ===
Position	Manufacturer	Total
1	Porsche	115
2	Lancia	20
=	Chevrolet	20
4	Fiat	10
5	Alpine	8
