= Hans-Georg Bürger =

German racing driver (1952–1980)

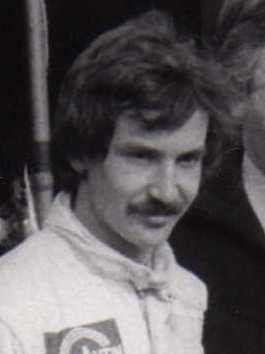
- Hans-Georg Bürger in 1979
- Nationality: West Germany
- Born: April 1, 1952 Welschbillig, West Germany
- Died: July 22, 1980 (aged 28) Amsterdam, Netherlands
- Retired: 1980

European F2 Championship
- Years active: 1980
- Teams: Tiga
- Starts: 5
- Wins: 0
- Poles: 0
- Best finish: 23rd in 1980

Hans-Georg Bürger (1 April 1952 – 22 July 1980) was a racing driver from West Germany. He was fatally injured in a racing accident while practicing for the 1980 European Formula Two Championship at Circuit Zandvoort in the Netherlands.

== Career ==
Bürger started his racing career at 23 years of age, winning the German Slalom title in 1976, and graduating to the Renault 5 Cup. In his rookie season, he finished with three wins and second overall in the championship. Thanks to the help of German magazine Autozeitung, in 1978, Bürger joined the Bertram Schäfer Racing team and made his F3 debut. He finished second in his rookie season in the F3 Championship. In 1979, he drove a BMW in the German Sportscar Championship. In the 1000 km of Nurburgring, he came in sixth place, with Eckhard Schimpf as his co-driver, and came in first overall in their class.

On 30 November 1979, Bürger had shared a BMW M1 entered by Dr. Helmut Marko, with Markus Höttinger in the 1000 km of Kyalami, retired. He and Höttinger were close friends, they both started racing the German Renault 5 Cup, then they were teammates in Team GS Sport and together graduated to the Procar series, becoming the most promising young German drivers, under the guidance of Jochen Neerpasch, general manager of Team BMW.

In 1980, Bürger raced in the European F2 Championship, finishing eighth at Thruxton and starting on the front row of the grid at Nurburgring.

== Death ==
Bürger qualified sixth during his first practice session for the Grote Prijs van Zandvoort, the Dutch round of the 1980 European F2 Championship. Towards the end of the second practice session, he had a minor crash in the chicane and went back to the pits. Even though the mechanics repaired the broken suspension and changed the nose of the car, he could not test his Tiga F280 BMW until the warm-up session on Sunday 20 July 1980. During his first two laps, he circulated slowly around the track to control the suspension. He took his third lap at full speed. On the following lap, he went off the track, on the left side at the Scheivlak bend, at about 200 km/h. He crashed head-on into the guardrail and hit his head on the fence-pole. The first driver to arrive at his accident was Beppe Gabbiani, who found Bürger's helmet broken in two.

In a few minutes, Bürger was taken by ambulance to the EG Elizabeth Hospital of Haarlem. One hour later, he was transferred to the intensive care unit of the Wilhelmina Hospital in Amsterdam, where he succumbed to his head injuries two days later.

== Sources ==
- Motorsport Memorial Page
