= Franz Konrad (racing driver) =

German racing driver (born 1951)

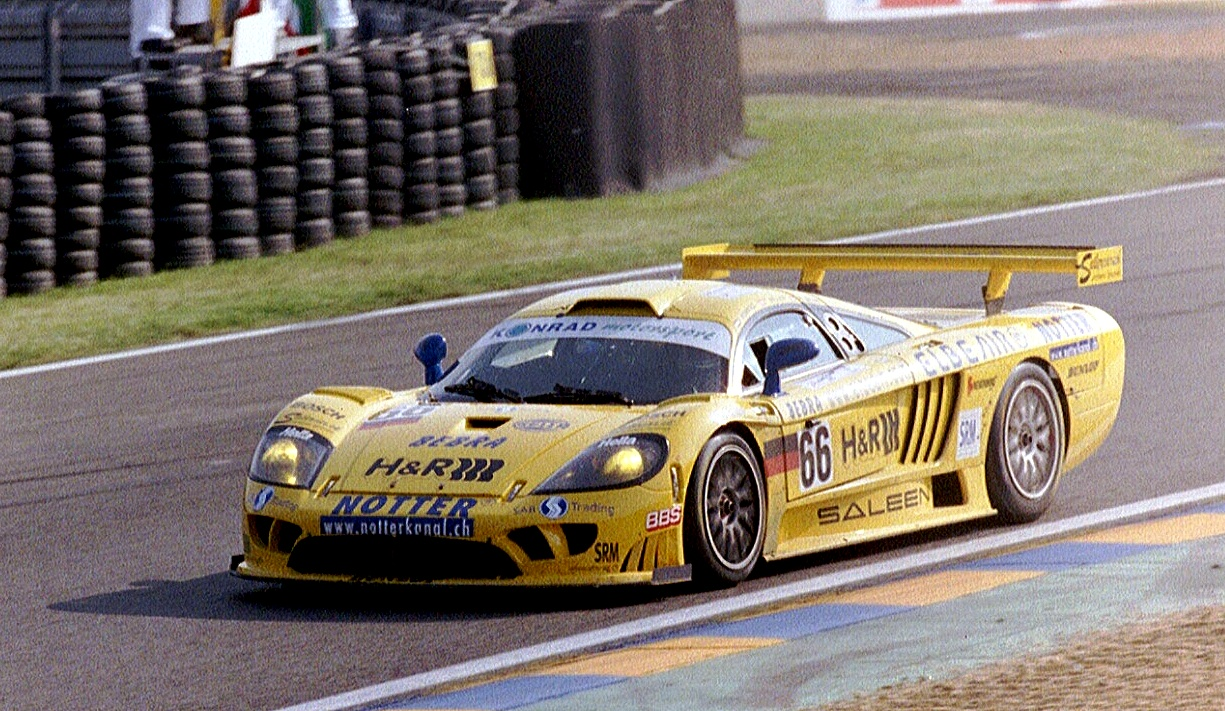
- Konrad at the 2003 24 Hours of Le Mans
- Nationality: (Austria) Austrian
- Born: 8 June 1951 (age 75) Graz, Austria

Awards
- 1997, 1998: Porsche Cup

Franz Konrad (born 8 June 1951 in Graz, Austria) is an Austrian former racing driver and founder of Konrad Motorsport in 1976.

As a driver, Konrad won the 1983 German Formula Three Championship in an Anson SA4-Toyota. In 1990, he took a career-best second in the 1990 24 Hours of Le Mans driving a Jaguar, then followed this with an overall victory in the 1993 Nürburgring 24 Hours driving a Porsche 911. He was also one of the drivers of the class-winning Porsche GT2 Twin Turbo at the 24 Hours of Daytona in 1998. Konrad won the Porsche Cup, an annual award presented by Porsche AG to recognize the world's most successful privateer racing driver competing with Porsche machinery in a customer racing team, in 1997 and 1998.

Konrad was also constructor of the Konrad KM-011, a Group C sportscar using Lamborghini power.

== Racing record ==
=== Complete World Sportscar Championship results ===
(key) (Races in bold indicate pole position) (Races in italics indicate fastest lap)

Year	Entrant	Class	Chassis	Engine	1	2	3	4	5	6	7	8	9	10	11	Pos.	Pts
1976	Heinzmann-Rennfeuerschutz-Racing-Team	T/GT3.0	Porsche Carrera RS	Porsche 3.0 F6	MUG	VAL	SIL	NÜR; 14	ÖST	GLN	DIJ					(Note: In 1976 and 1977 the World Championship was divided into two series that ran simultaneously but separately: The World Sportscar Championship and the World Championship for Makes.)	
1977	Kannacher GT-Racing	Gr.5	Porsche 935	Porsche 2.8 F6t	DAY	MUG	SIL; 5										
1977	Porsche Kremer Racing	Gr.5	Porsche 935	Porsche 2.8 F6t				NÜR; 4	GLN	MOS	BRH; 3	HOC; 5	VAL				
1978	Konrad Motorsport	Gr.5	Porsche 935	Porsche 2.8 F6t	DAY; 11	MUG; 2	DIJ; Ret	SIL; 6	NÜR; 4	MIS; 3	GLN	VAL; 7				(Note: No drivers' Championship.)	
1983	Porsche Kremer Racing	C	Porsche 956	Porsche Type-935 2.6 F6t	MNZ	SIL	NÜR	LMS	SPA; Ret	FUJ; Ret						NC	0
1983	Pametex/Pretoria Brick	C	Porsche CK5	Porsche Type-935 2.8 F6t							KYA; DSQ					NC	0
1984	Porsche Kremer Racing	C1	Porsche 956	Porsche Type-935 2.6 F6t	MNZ	SIL; 6	LMS									23rd	26
1984	Skoal Bandit Porsche Team	C1	Porsche 956	Porsche Type-935 2.6 F6t				NÜR; DNS	BRH			IMO; 8	FUJ	KYA	SAN; 9	23rd	26
1984	Skoal Bandit Porsche Team	C1	Porsche 956B	Porsche Type-935 2.6 F6t						MOS; 2						23rd	26
1984	Skoal Bandit Porsche Team	C1	Porsche 962C	Porsche Type-935 2.6 F6t							SPA; Ret					23rd	26
1985	Porsche Kremer Racing	C1	Porsche 962C	Porsche Type-935 2.6 F6t	MUG	MNZ	SIL	LMS; 9								32nd	12
1985	New-Man Joest Racing	C1	Porsche 956	Porsche Type-935 2.6 F6t					HOC; Ret	MOS	SPA	BRH	FUJ			32nd	12
1985	John Fitzpatrick Racing	C1	Porsche 956B	Porsche Type-935 2.6 F6t										SHA; 4		32nd	12
1986	Richard Cleare Racing	GTP	March 85G	Porsche Type-962 3.2 F6t	MNZ	SIL; Ret	LMS									NC	0
1986	SAT Porsche Kremer Team	C1	Porsche 956	Porsche Type-935 2.8 F6t				NOR; 12	BRH	JER	NÜR	SPA				NC	0
1986	Cara International Racing	C1	LM 06C	Toyota 4T-GT 2.1 L4t									FUJ; 16			NC	0
1987	Porsche Kremer Racing	C1	Porsche 962C	Porsche Type-935 2.8 F6t	JAR	JER	MNZ	SIL	LMS; 4					FUJ; 12		34th	10
1987	Mussato Action Car	C1	Lancia LC2	Ferrari 308C 3.0 V8t						NOR; Ret	BRH	NÜR	SPA			34th	10
1988	Blaupunkt Joest Racing	C1	Porsche 962C	Porsche Type-935 2.8 F6t	JER	JAR	MNZ	SIL	LMS; 5							29th	30
1988	Blaupunkt Joest Racing	C1	Porsche 962C	Porsche Type-935 3.0 F6t						BRN; 6	BRH					29th	30
1988	Dauer Racing	C1	Porsche 962C	Porsche Type-935 3.0 F6t								NÜR; Ret	SPA	FUJ	SAN	29th	30
1989	Dauer Racing	C1	Porsche 962C	Porsche Type-935 3.0 F6t	SUZ; 15	DIJ; Ret	JAR									34th	8
1989	Brun Motorsport	C1	Porsche 962C	Porsche Type-935 3.0 F6t				BRH; 16	NÜR; 6	DON	SPA					34th	8
1989	Porsche Kremer Racing	C1	Porsche 962-CK6	Porsche Type-935 3.0 F6t								MEX; 9				34th	8
1990	Konrad Motorsport	C	Porsche 962C	Porsche Type-935 3.0 F6t	SUZ; 19	MNZ; Ret	SIL; 14	SPA; 13	DIJ; 20	NÜR; 14	DON; 16	CGV; 22	MEX; 12			NC	0
1991	Konrad Motorsport	C2	Porsche 962C	Porsche Type-935 3.2 F6t	SUZ	MNZ; Ret	SIL; Ret	LMS; Ret	NÜR; 9							54th	2
1991	Konrad Motorsport	C1	Konrad KM-011	Lamborghini 3512 3.5 V12					NÜR; DNQ	MAG; Ret	MEX; Ret	AUT; Ret				54th	2

Footnotes

=== 24 Hours of Le Mans results ===
Year	Team	Co-Drivers	Car	Class	Laps	Pos.	Class Pos.
1978	(United States) Whittington Bros. Racing	(United States) Don Whittington (United States) Bill Whittington	Porsche 935/77	Gr.5 +2.0	41	DNF	DNF
1985	(Germany) Kremer Porsche Racing	(France) Jean-Pierre Jarier (New Zealand) Mike Thackwell	Porsche 962C	C1	356	9th	9th
1987	(Germany) Porsche Kremer Racing	(South Africa) George Fouché (South Africa) Wayne Taylor	Porsche 962C	C1	327	4th	4th
1988	(Germany) Blaupunkt Joest Racing	(United Kingdom) David Hobbs (Belgium) Didier Theys	Porsche 962C	C1	380	5th	5th
1989	(Switzerland) Repsol Brun Motorsport	(Germany) Rudi Seher (Spain) Andrés Vilariño	Porsche 962C	C1	81	DNF	DNF
1990	(United Kingdom) Silk Cut Jaguar (United Kingdom) Tom Walkinshaw Racing	(Netherlands) Jan Lammers (United Kingdom) Andy Wallace	Jaguar XJR-12	C1	355	**2nd**	**2nd**
1991	(Austria) Konrad Motorsport	(United Kingdom) Anthony Reid (Switzerland) Pierre-Alain Lombardi	Porsche 962C	C2	98	DNF	DNF
1993	(Austria) Konrad Motorsport	(Japan) Jun Harada (Brazil) Antônio Hermann de Azevedo	Porsche 911 Carrera RS	GT	293	19th	5th
1994	(Austria) Konrad Motorsport	(Brazil) Antônio Hermann de Azevedo (Germany) Mike Sommer	Porsche 911 Turbo	GT1	100	DNF	DNF
1995	(Germany) Porsche Kremer Racing	(Germany) Jürgen Lässig (Brazil) Antônio Hermann de Azevedo	Kremer K8 Spyder-Porsche	WSC	163	DNF	DNF
1996	(Germany) Konrad Motorsport	(Brazil) Antônio Hermann de Azevedo (Germany) Wido Rössler	Porsche 911 GT2 Evo	GT1	107	DNF	DNF
1997	(Germany) Konrad Motorsport	(Italy) Mauro Baldi (United Kingdom) Robert Nearn	Porsche 911 GT1	GT1	138	DNF	DNF
1998	(Germany) Konrad Motorsport	(United States) Larry Schumacher (United States) Nick Ham	Porsche 911 GT2	GT2	24	DNF	DNF
1999	(Germany) Konrad Motorsport	(United States) Peter Kitchak (United States) Charles Slater	Porsche 911 GT2	GTS	293	18th	7th
2001	(United States) Saleen-Allen Speedlab	(United Kingdom) Oliver Gavin (United States) Terry Borcheller	Saleen S7-R-Ford	GTS	246	18th	**3rd**
2002	(Germany) Konrad Motorsport	(United States) Terry Borcheller (Switzerland) Toni Seiler	Saleen S7-R-Ford	GTS	266	26th	7th
2003	(Germany) Konrad Motorsport	(Switzerland) Toni Seiler (Switzerland) Walter Brun	Saleen S7-R-Ford	GTS	91	DNF	DNF

=== Complete European Formula Two Championship results ===
(key) (Races in bold indicate pole position; races in italics indicate fastest lap)

Year	Entrant	Chassis	Engine	1	2	3	4	5	6	7	8	9	10	11	12	13	Pos.	Pts
1980	URD Rennwagenbau	March 792	BMW	THR	HOC	NÜR	VAL	PAU	SIL	ZOL; DNQ	MUG	ZAN	PER	MIS			NC	0
1980	GELO Racing Team	March 792	BMW												HOC; Ret		NC	0
1981	Scuderia Teutonia	March 802	BMW	SIL	HOC	THR	NÜR; 11	VAL	MUG	PAU	PER	SPA	DON	MIS	MAN		NC	0
1982	Franz Konrad Racing	March 802	BMW	SIL; 14	HOC; Ret	THR; 16	NÜR; 11	MUG	VAL	PAU	SPA	HOC	DON	MAN	PER	MIS	NC	0

=== Complete FIA GT Championship results ===
(key) (Races in bold indicate pole position) (Races in italics indicate fastest lap)

Year	Team	Car	Class	1	2	3	4	5	6	7	8	9	10	11	Pos.	Pts
1997	Konrad Motorsport	Porsche 911 GT2	GT2	HOC; NC			NÜR; 3	SPA; 7	A1R; Ret	SUZ; 4	DON; 5	MUG	SEB; 6	LAG; Ret	17th	10
1997	Konrad Motorsport	Porsche 911 GT1	GT1		SIL; 9	HEL; 7									NC	0
1998	Konrad Motorsport	Porsche 911 GT2	GT2	OSC; 3	SIL; 7	HOC; 11	DIJ; 4	HUN; DNS	SUZ; 4	DON; 2	A1R; 3	HOM; Ret	LAG; Ret		6th	20
1999	Konrad Motorsport	Porsche 911 GT2	GT	MNZ; 15	SIL; 13	HOC; 3	HUN; 3	ZOL; 6	OSC; 8	DON; 3	HOM; Ret	GLN; 11	ZHU; Ret		15th	13
2000	Konrad Motorsport	Porsche 911 GT2	GT	VAL; 8	EST; 19	MNZ; Ret	SIL; 6	HUN; 5	ZOL; 11	A1R; 5	LAU; 5	BRN	MAG		16th	7
2003	Konrad Motorsport	Saleen S7-R	GT	CAT; 8	MAG; Ret	**PER**; Ret	**BRN**; 9	DON; 6	SPA; Ret	**AND**; 2	**OSC**; DSQ	EST; 4	MNZ; 11		16th	17
2004	Konrad Motorsport	Saleen S7-R	GT	MNZ; Ret	VAL; DNS	**MAG**; DNS	**HOC**; Ret	BRN; 6	DON	SPA; Ret	IMO; Ret	**OSC**; 15	DUB	ZHU; Ret	59th	3
2005	Konrad Motorsport	Saleen S7-R	GT1	MNZ; Ret	MAG; 11	SIL	IMO	BRN	SPA	OSC; 10	IST	ZHU; Ret	DUB; Ret	BHR; 11	NC	0

=== Complete WeatherTech SportsCar Championship results ===
(key) (Races in bold indicate pole position) (Races in italics indicate fastest lap)

Year	Team	Class	Make	Engine	1	2	3	4	5	6	7	8	9	10	11	12	Pos.	Pts
2014	Dempsey Racing	GTD	Porsche 911 GT America	Porsche 4.0 Flat-6	DAY	SEB; 21	LAG	DET	WGL	MOS	IMS	ROA	VIR	COA	PET		156th	1
2016	Konrad Motorsport	GTD	Lamborghini Huracán GT3	Lamborghini DFJ 5.2 V10	DAY; 10	SEB; 14	LAG	DET	WGL	MOS	LIM	ROA	VIR	COA	PET		65th	2
2017	Konrad Motorsport	GTD	Lamborghini Huracán GT3	Lamborghini DFJ 5.2 V10	DAY; 20	SEB	LBH	COA	DET	WGL	MOS	LIM	ROA	VIR	LAG	PET	80th	11

Sporting positions
Preceded by John Nielsen	German Formula Three champion 1983	Succeeded by Kurt Thiim
