= Harald Grohs =

German racing driver (born 1944)

Harald Grohs (born 28 January 1944) is a racing driver and team owner from Essen, Germany.

Grohs took part in more than 50 24 Hours endurance racing races, mainly 24 Hours of Le Mans and 24 Hours Nürburgring.

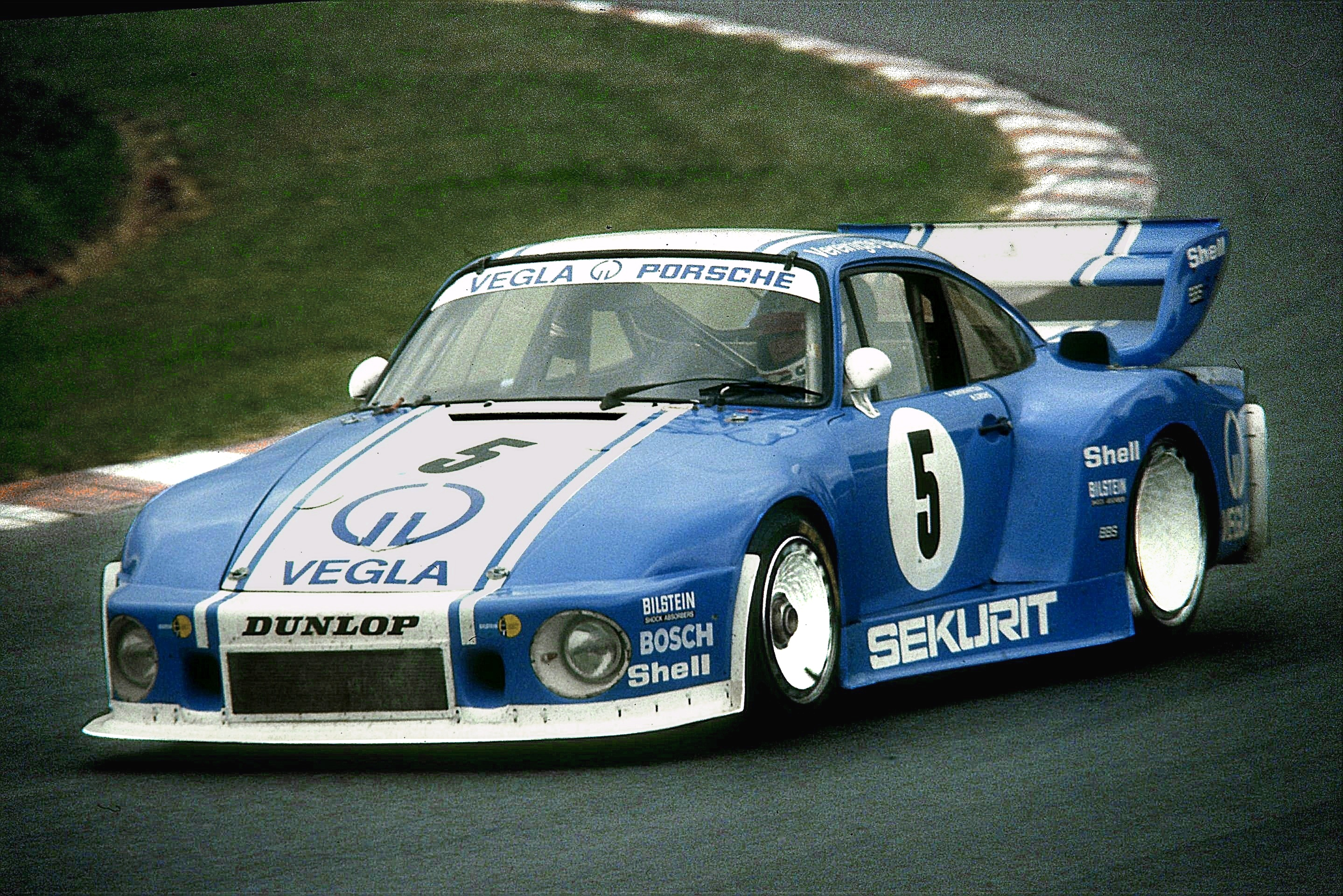
Harald Grohs in 1980 with Porsche 935 during practice for 1000 km Nürburgring

== Career as driver ==
- 1973 first races in a Porsche 911, four wins, invited to race BMW for Team Faltz
- 1974 German Renault 5 Cup, 6 wins, 2nd in championship
- 1975 Deutsche Rennsport Meisterschaft (DRM) for BMW for Team Faltz, first wins, but also a bad crash on the Nürburgring, wins 9 Hours of Kyalami with Jody Scheckter
- 1976 International races for BMW, with Hans-Joachim Stuck, Ronnie Peterson, Gunnar Nilsson, Jody Scheckter, John Fitzpatrick. "Only Stuck and Petersson were a little faster, but partnered with Petersson, we could never finish a race."
- 1977 National DRM races with an FIA-Group 5-spec BMW 320, against the "BMW-Junior-Teams"
- 1978 Worst crash of his career, rolling seven times on the Nürburgring Nordschleife, escaping injured, but shocked
- 1997 retires from Porsche Carrera Cup and other circuit racing, except occasional starts on the old Nürburgring
- 1999 Another entry in the 24 Hours of Nürburgring, his 50th "marathon" overall

== Career as team owner ==
- 1997 Grohs Motorsport founded

== Racing record ==
=== Complete World Sportscar Championship results ===
(key) (Races in bold indicate pole position) (Races in italics indicate fastest lap)

Year	Entrant	Class	Chassis	Engine	1	2	3	4	5	6	7	8	9	10	11	12	13	14	15	Pos.	Pts
1975	B.M.W. Alpina	T +2.0	BMW 3.0 CSL	BMW 3.5 L6	DAY	MUG	DIJ	MNZ	SPA	PER	NÜR; DNS	ÖST	GLN							(Note: No drivers' Championship.)	
1976	B.M.W. Alpina	Gr.5	BMW 3.5 CSL	BMW 3.5 L6	MUG; 10	VAL; 2	SIL; 4	NÜR; Ret	ÖST; Ret	GLN	DIJ; 9									(Note: In 1976 and 1977 the World Championship was divided into two series that ran simultaneously but separately: The World Sportscar Championship and the World Championship for Makes.)	
1977	BMW Faltz	Gr.5	BMW 320i	BMW M12 2.0 L4	DAY	MUG	SIL	NÜR; Ret	GLN	MOS	BRH	HOC; NC	VAL; DNS								
1978	BMW Belgique	Gr.5	BMW 320i	BMW M12 2.0 L4	DAY	MUG; 10	DIJ; 13	SIL; 3	NÜR; 9	MIS; 4		VAL; Ret									
1978	BMW Faltz Essen	Gr.5	BMW 320i	BMW M12 2.0 L4							GLN; 31										
1979	Zakspeed Racing	Gr.5	Lotus Europa	Ford 1.4 L4t	DAY	MUG	DIJ	SIL	NÜR; Ret	PER	GLN	BRH	VAL								
1980	Vegla Racing Team	Gr.5	Porsche 935	Porsche 2.9 F6t	DAY	BRH; 7	MUG	MNZ; 4	SIL; 5	NÜR; 7	LMS; 8										
1980	Andial Racing	Gr.5	Porsche 935	Porsche F6t								GLN; 8	MOS	VAL	DIJ						
1981	Andial Racing	Gr.5	Porsche 935-K3	Porsche 3.2 F6t	DAY; Ret	SEB; 4	MUG										MOS; 1	ROA; 1		2nd	116.5
1981	Vegla Racing Team	Gr.5	Porsche 935J	Porsche 3.2 F6t				MNZ; Ret	RSD	SIL; 1	NÜR; 7								BRH; 6	2nd	116.5
1981	Vegla Racing Team	Gr.5	Porsche 935-K2	Porsche 3.0 F6t								LMS; 10	PER	DAY	GLN	SPA				2nd	116.5
1982	Vegla Racing Team	Gr.5	Porsche 935J	Porsche 2.8 F6t	MNZ	SIL; 12		LMS; DNS												NC	0
1982	Kannacher GT Racing	C	URD C81	BMW M88 3.5 L6			NÜR; Ret		SPA; Ret	MUG	FUJ	BRH; 13								NC	0
1983	Obermaier Racing	C	Porsche 956	Porsche Type 935/76 2.6 F6t	MNZ	SIL; 4														19th	20
1983	Brun Motorsport GmbH	B	BMW M1	BMW M88 3.5 L6			NÜR; Ret													19th	20
1983	Brun Motorsport GmbH	C	Sehcar C830	Porsche Type 935/76 2.6 F6t				LMS; DNS												19th	20
1983	Brun Motorsport GmbH	C	Porsche 956	Porsche Type 935/76 2.6 F6t					SPA; 4	FUJ	KYA; Ret									19th	20
1984	Brun Motorsport GmbH	C1	Porsche 956	Porsche Type 935/76 2.6 F6t	MNZ; 4	SIL	LMS													15th	36
1984	Brun Motorsport GmbH	C1	Porsche 956B	Porsche Type 935/76 2.6 F6t				NÜR; Ret	BRH; 5	MOS	SPA; 3									15th	36
1984	Obermaier Racing	C1	Porsche 956	Porsche Type 935/76 2.6 F6t								IMO; 6	FUJ	KYA	SAN					15th	36
1985	Vogelsang Automobil Motorsport	B	BMW M1	BMW M88 3.5 L6	MUG	MNZ	SIL	LMS; Ret	HOC; 15	MOS	SPA	BRH	FUJ	SHA						NC	0
1986	Obermaier Racing	C1	Porsche 956	Porsche Type 935/76 2.6 F6t	MNZ	SIL	LMS	NOR	BRH	JER	NÜR; 4	SPA								26th	18
1986	Joest Racing	C1	Porsche 956	Porsche Type 935/79 2.8 F6t									FUJ; 5							26th	18
1987	Dauer Racing	C1	Porsche 962C	Porsche Type 935/79 2.8 F6t	JAR	JER	MNZ	SIL	LMS	NOR	BRH	NÜR; 8	SPA							54th	3
1987	Joest Racing	C1	Porsche 962C	Porsche Type 935 3.0 F6t										FUJ; Ret						54th	3
1988	Porsche Kremer Racing	C1	Porsche 962C	Porsche Type 935 3.0 F6t	JER	JAR	MNZ	SIL; Ret	LMS; 8	BRN	BRH	NÜR	SPA							NC	0
1988	Joest Racing	C1	Porsche 962C	Porsche Type 935 3.0 F6t										FUJ; Ret	SAN					NC	0
1989	Nova Engineering	C1	Porsche 962C	Porsche Type 935 3.0 F6t	SUZ; 10	DIJ	JAR	BRH	NÜR	DON	SPA	MEX								55th	1
1990	Obermaier Racing	C	Porsche 962C	Porsche Type 935 3.0 F6t	SUZ; Ret	MNZ; 15	SIL; 10	SPA; Ret	DIJ; 17	NÜR; 17	DON; 13	CGV; 11	MEX; 9							NC	0

Footnotes

=== Complete 24 Hours of Le Mans results ===
Year	Team	Co-Drivers	Car	Class	Laps	Pos.	Class Pos.
1976	(Germany) B.M.W. Motorsport GmbH	(United States) Sam Posey (Belgium) Hughes de Fierlandt	BMW 3.5 CSL	Gr.5	299	10th	4th
1979	(Germany) Gelo Sportswear International	(United Kingdom) John Fitzpatrick (France) Jean-Louis Lafosse	Porsche 935	Gr.5 +2.5	196	DNF	DNF
1980	(Germany) Vegla Racing Team	(Germany) Dieter Schornstein (Germany) Götz von Tschirnhaus	Porsche 935	Gr.5	312	8th	**1st**
1981	(Germany) Vegla Racing Team	(Germany) Dieter Schornstein (Germany) Götz von Tschirnhaus	Porsche 935-K2	Gr.5	320	10th	**3rd**
1982	(Germany) Vegla Racing Team	(Germany) Dieter Schornstein (Colombia) Mauricio de Narváez	Porsche 935J	Gr.5	-	DNS	DNS
1983	(Switzerland) Brun Motorsport GmbH	(Germany) Hans-Joachim Stuck (Switzerland) Walter Brun	Sehcar C830-Porsche	C	-	DNS	DNS
1985	(Switzerland) Vogelsang	(Germany) Altfrid Heger (Germany) Kurt König	BMW M1	B	32	DNF	DNF
1988	(Germany) Leyton House Kremer Racing	(Denmark) Kris Nissen (South Africa) George Fouché	Porsche 962C	C1	371	8th	8th
1989	(Switzerland) Brun Motorsport	(Japan) Akihiko Nakaya (South Africa) Sarel van der Merwe	Porsche 962C	C1	78	DNF	DNF
1990	(Germany) Obermaier Racing	(Belgium) Marc Duez (Germany) Jürgen Oppermann	Porsche 962C	C1	140	DNF	DNF
1993	(Belgium) Team Paduwa	(Belgium) Jean-Paul Libert (Belgium) Didier Theys	Porsche 964 Carrera 2	GT	8	DNF	DNF
1998	(Canada) C. J. Motorsport	(United States) John Morton (Canada) John Graham	Porsche 911 GT2	GT2	164	DNF	DNF

=== Complete European Formula Two Championship results ===
(key) (Races in bold indicate pole position; races in italics indicate fastest lap)

Year	Entrant	Chassis	Engine	1	2	3	4	5	6	7	8	9	10	11	12	Pos.	Pts
1980	URD Rennwagenbau	March 792	Hart	THR	HOC; Ret	NÜR	VAL	PAU	SIL	ZOL	MUG	ZAN	PER	MIS	HOC	NC	0

=== Complete Deutsche Tourenwagen Meisterschaft results ===
(key) (Races in bold indicate pole position) (Races in italics indicate fastest lap)

Year	Team	Car	1	2	3	4	5	6	7	8	9	10	11	12	13	14	15	16	17	18	19	20	21	22	23	24	Pos.	Pts
1984	Valier Motorsport	BMW 635 CSi	ZOL; 1	HOC; DSQ	AVU; 7	AVU; Ret	**MFA**; 2	WUN; 2	**NÜR**; Ret	NÜR; 2	NOR; 18	**NÜR**; 1	**DIE**; 1	**HOC**; Ret	HOC; DNS	ZOL; 1	NÜR; 8										3rd	147
1985	Vogelsang Automobil Motorsport	BMW 635 CSi	ZOL; 1	WUN; 8	AVU; 18	MFA; 4	ERD; 7	ERD; 7	DIE; 3	DIE; 11	ZOL; Ret	SIE; 12	NÜR; 2														3rd	96
1986	Ford Rennsport HWRT	Ford Sierra XR4 TI	**ZOL**; Ret	HOC	NÜR; Ret	AVU; Ret	MFA	WUN; Ret	NÜR	ZOL; 12	NÜR																33rd	7
1987	Valier Motorsport	BMW M3	HOC; 1	ZOL; Ret	NÜR; 3	AVU; 3	MFA; 4	**NOR**; Ret	**NÜR**; Ret	WUN; 1	DIE; 4	SAL; Ret															5th	102
1988	Valier Motorsport	BMW M3	ZOL; 1; 4	ZOL; 2; 20	**HOC**; **1**; 3	HOC; 2; 3	NÜR; 1; 9	NÜR; 2; 10	BRN; 1; 21	BRN; 2 Ret	**AVU**; **1**; 2	AVU; 2; 3	MFA; 1; 11	MFA; 2; 13	NÜR; 1 Ret	NÜR; 2; 5	NOR; 1; 7	NOR; 2; 8	WUN; 1; 11	WUN; 2; 18	SAL; 1 C	SAL; 2 C	HUN; 1 Ret	HUN; 2 Ret	HOC; 1; 17	HOC; 2; 21	10th	162
1989	Valier Motorsport	BMW M3 Evo	ZOL; 1	ZOL; 2	HOC; 1; 18	HOC; 2; 12	NÜR; 1	NÜR; 2	MFA; 1; 16	MFA; 2; 19	AVU; 1; 11	AVU; 2 Ret	NÜR; 1; 14	NÜR; 2; 14	NOR; 1 DNQ	NOR; 2 DNQ	HOC; 1 DNQ	HOC; 2 DNQ	DIE; 1; 16	DIE; 2; 8	NÜR; 1 Ret	NÜR; 2 DNS	HOC; 1 Ret	HOC; 2 DNS			22nd	43
1990	Valier Motorsport	BMW M3 Evo	ZOL; 1; 20	ZOL; 2 Ret	HOC; 1	HOC; 2	NÜR; 1; 10	NÜR; 2 Ret	AVU; 1	AVU; 2	MFA; 1	MFA; 2	WUN; 1	WUN; 2	NÜR; 1	NÜR; 2	NOR; 1; 20	NOR; 2 Ret	DIE; 1 Ret	DIE; 2 DNS	NÜR; 1	NÜR; 2					33rd	1
1990	Valier Motorsport	BMW M3 Sport Evo																					HOC; 1; 21	HOC; 2 Ret			33rd	1

=== Complete Super Tourenwagen Cup results ===
(key) (Races in bold indicate pole position) (Races in italics indicate fastest lap)

Year	Team	Car	1	2	3	4	5	6	7	8	9	10	11	12	13	14	15	16	Pos.	Pts
1995	BMW Team Isert	BMW 318is	ZOL; 1; 19	ZOL; 2; 8	SPA; 1; 8	SPA; 2; 8	ÖST; 1; 18	ÖST; 2; 11	HOC; 1 Ret	HOC; 2 DNS	NÜR; 1; 19	NÜR; 2; 20	SAL; 1	SAL; 2	AVU; 1	AVU; 2	NÜR; 1	NÜR; 2	19th	94

Sporting positions
Preceded by Bernd Mayländer	Porsche Carrera Cup Germany champion 1996	Succeeded by Ralf Kelleners
