= 1976 6 Hours of Silverstone =

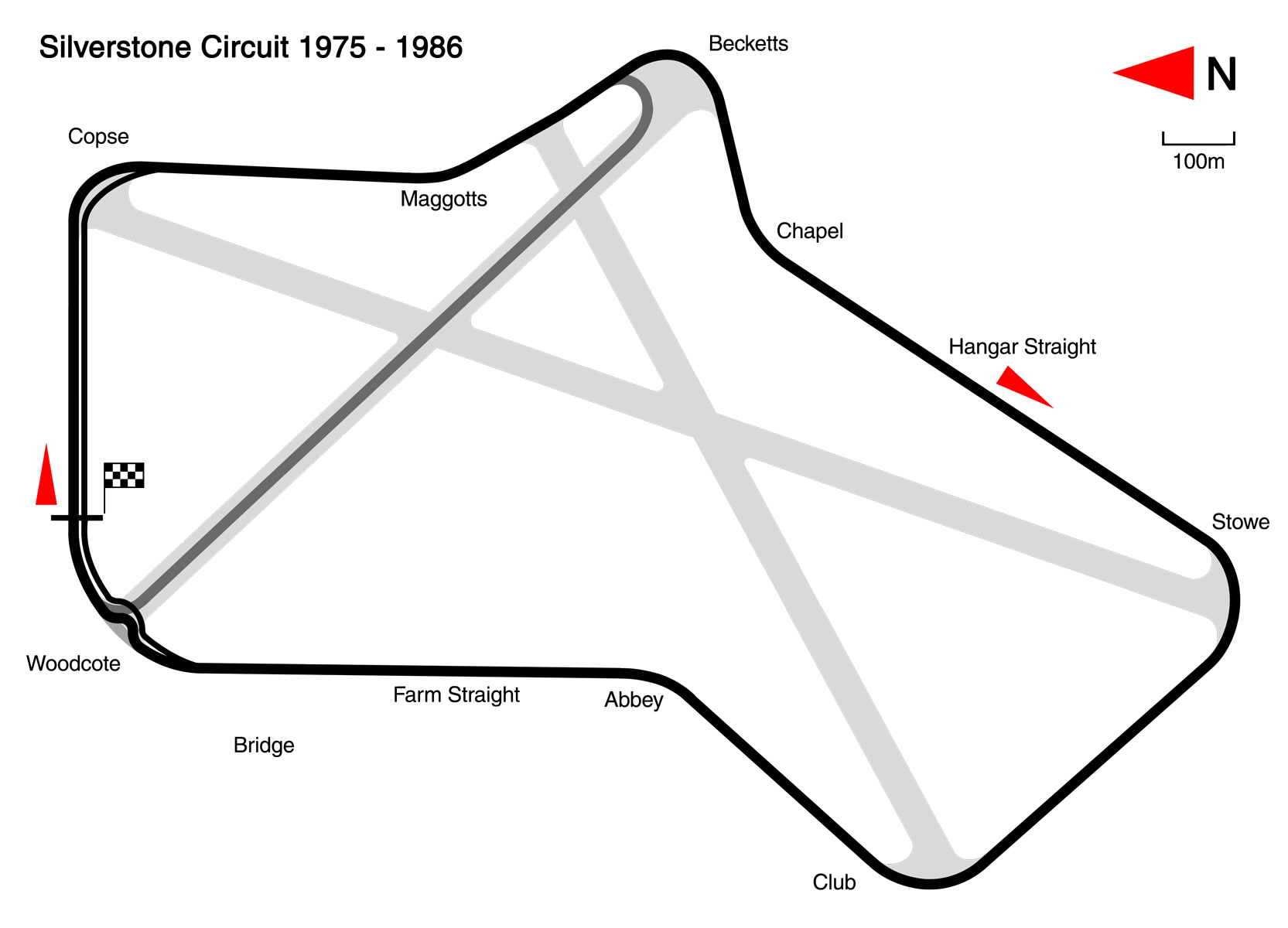
Map of the Silverstone Circuit (1975–1986)

The 1976 Six Hours of Silverstone was the third race of the 1976 World Championship for Makes. It took place at the Silverstone Circuit, Great Britain on 9 May 1976. It was open to Group 5 Special Production cars, Group 4 GT cars and Group 2 Touring Cars.

The race was won by John Fitzpatrick and Tom Walkinshaw driving a BMW 3.0 CSL. Pre-race favorites Jochen Mass and Jacky Ickx were fastest in qualifying, one second quicker per lap than second-placed Ronnie Peterson and Gunnar Nilsson's 800 PS (590 kW) BMW 3.2 CSL Turbo. However, Ickx destroyed the clutch in the start, handicapping the car throughout the race and leading to the car having to make numerous, unplanned pit stops to deal with gearbox issues. Their works Porsche ended up in tenth place, 51 laps down on the winners.

== Official Results ==
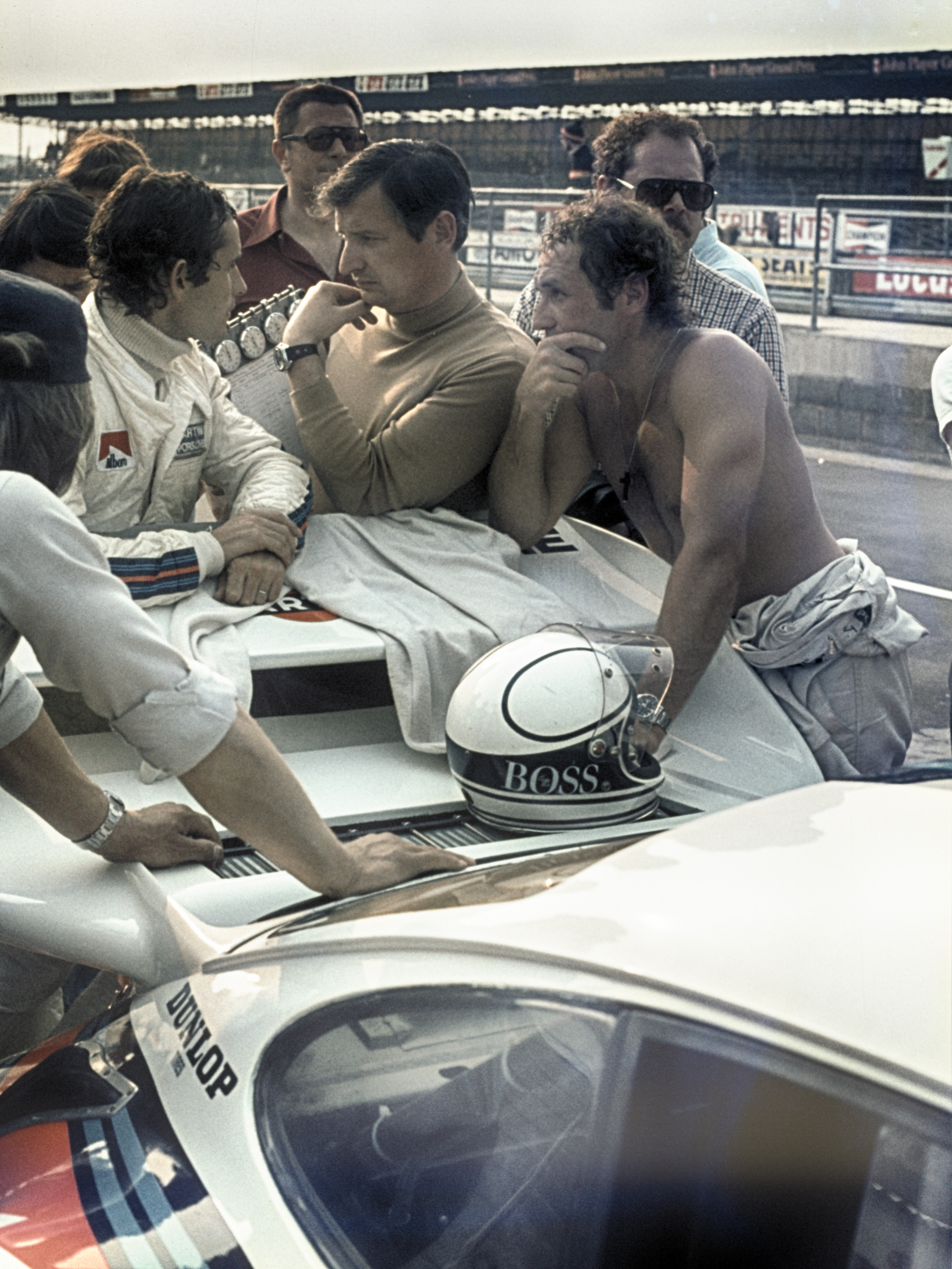
The Porsche 935 of Martini Racing-Porsche at the 1976 6 Hours of Silverstone

.

Pos	Class	No	Team	Drivers	Chassis	Gap
Pos	Class	No	Team	Drivers	Engine	Gap
1	Group 5 over 2000	4	(United Kingdom) Hermetite Productions Ltd. (TWR)	(United Kingdom) John Fitzpatrick (United Kingdom) Tom Walkinshaw	BMW 3.0CSL	
1	Group 5 over 2000	4	(United Kingdom) Hermetite Productions Ltd. (TWR)	(United Kingdom) John Fitzpatrick (United Kingdom) Tom Walkinshaw	BMW S6 3.5 L	
2	Group 5 over 2000	10	(Germany) Kremer Racing	(France) Bob Wollek (Germany) Hans Heyer	Porsche 935	
2	Group 5 over 2000	10	(Germany) Kremer Racing	(France) Bob Wollek (Germany) Hans Heyer	Porsche Type 935 Turbo Flat-6 2.8 L	
3	Group 5 over 2000	16	(Germany) Egon Evertz	(Finland) Leo Kinnunen (Germany) Egon Evertz	Porsche 934/5	2 laps
3	Group 5 over 2000	16	(Germany) Egon Evertz	(Finland) Leo Kinnunen (Germany) Egon Evertz	Porsche Type 911 Turbo Flat-6 3.0 L	2 laps
4	Group 5 over 2000	3	(Germany) Alpina	(Germany) Harald Grohs (Belgium) Hughes de Fierlant	BMW 3.0CSL	4 laps
4	Group 5 over 2000	3	(Germany) Alpina	(Germany) Harald Grohs (Belgium) Hughes de Fierlant	BMW S6 3,5 L	4 laps
5	Group 4	25	(Germany) Egon Evertz	(Italy) Lella Lombardi (Germany) Heinz Martin	Porsche 934	12 laps
5	Group 4	25	(Germany) Egon Evertz	(Italy) Lella Lombardi (Germany) Heinz Martin	Porsche Type 911 Turbo Flat-6 3.0 L	12 laps
6	Group 5; 2000	54	(Italy) Jolly Club	(Italy) Martino Finotto (Italy) Umberto Grano (Italy) Renzo Zorzi	Ford Escort	18 laps
6	Group 5; 2000	54	(Italy) Jolly Club	(Italy) Martino Finotto (Italy) Umberto Grano (Italy) Renzo Zorzi	Ford BDG S4 2.0 L	18 laps
7	Group 4	31	(Sweden) Kenneth Leim	(Sweden) Kenneth Leim (Sweden) Kurt Simonsen	Porsche 911 RSR	29 laps
7	Group 4	31	(Sweden) Kenneth Leim	(Sweden) Kenneth Leim (Sweden) Kurt Simonsen	Porsche Type 911 Turbo Flat-6 3.0 L	29 laps
8	Group 5	24	(United Kingdom) Bob Neville	(United Kingdom) Bob Neville (United Kingdom) Derek Worthington	MG MGB GT V8	33 Laps
8	Group 5	24	(United Kingdom) Bob Neville	(United Kingdom) Bob Neville (United Kingdom) Derek Worthington	Rover V8 3.5 L	33 Laps
9	Group 2	58	(Republic of Ireland) Tony Brennan	(Republic of Ireland) Jody Carr (Republic of Ireland) Tony Brennan (Republic of Ireland) Arthur Collier	Ford Escort	40 Laps
9	Group 2	58	(Republic of Ireland) Tony Brennan	(Republic of Ireland) Jody Carr (Republic of Ireland) Tony Brennan (Republic of Ireland) Arthur Collier	Ford BDG S4 2.0 L	40 Laps
10	Group 5 over 2000	9	(Germany) Martini Racing-Porsche	(Germany) Jochen Mass (Belgium) Jacky Ickx	Porsche 935	51 Laps
10	Group 5 over 2000	9	(Germany) Martini Racing-Porsche	(Germany) Jochen Mass (Belgium) Jacky Ickx	Porsche Type 935 Turbo Flat-6 2.8 L	51 Laps
NC	Group 2	57	(United Kingdom) Ken Coffey	(United Kingdom) Ken Coffey (Belgium) Eric Mandron	Ford Escort	59 laps
NC	Group 2	57	(United Kingdom) Ken Coffey	(United Kingdom) Ken Coffey (Belgium) Eric Mandron	Ford BDG S4 2.0 L	59 laps
Non-finishers						Laps completed
DNF	Group 5 over 2000	2	(Germany) Schnitzer Motorsport	(Austria) Dieter Quester (Germany) Albrecht Krebs	BMW 3.0 CSL	160
DNF	Group 5 over 2000	2	(Germany) Schnitzer Motorsport	(Austria) Dieter Quester (Germany) Albrecht Krebs	BMW M30 S6 3.2 L	160
DNF	Group 4	15	(France) Louis Meznarie	(France) Hubert Striebig (France) Anne-Charlotte Verney (France) Guy Chasseuil	Porsche 911 RSR	90
DNF	Group 4	15	(France) Louis Meznarie	(France) Hubert Striebig (France) Anne-Charlotte Verney (France) Guy Chasseuil	Porsche Type 911 Turbo Flat-6 3.0 L	90
DNF	Group 5	37	(United Kingdom) John Cooper	(United Kingdom) John Cooper (United Kingdom) Nick Faure	Porsche 911 RSR	90
DNF	Group 5	37	(United Kingdom) John Cooper	(United Kingdom) John Cooper (United Kingdom) Nick Faure	Porsche Type 911 Turbo Flat-6 3.0 L	90
DNF	Group 2	51	Toyota Switzerland	(Liechtenstein) Manfred Schurti (Switzerland) Paul Keller	Toyota Celica	83
DNF	Group 2	51	Toyota Switzerland	(Liechtenstein) Manfred Schurti (Switzerland) Paul Keller	Rover V8 3.5 L	83
DNF	Group 5	22	(Sweden) Reine Wisell	(Sweden) Reine Wisell (United Kingdom) Stuart Graham	Chevrolet Camaro Z	64
DNF	Group 5	22	(Sweden) Reine Wisell	(Sweden) Reine Wisell (United Kingdom) Stuart Graham	Chevrolet V8 5.7 L	64
DNF	Group 5 over 2000	1	(Germany) BMW Motorsport	(Sweden) Ronnie Peterson (Sweden) Gunnar Nilsson (Germany) Hans-Joachim Stuck	BMW 3.2 CSL	43 (gearbox)
DNF	Group 5 over 2000	1	(Germany) BMW Motorsport	(Sweden) Ronnie Peterson (Sweden) Gunnar Nilsson (Germany) Hans-Joachim Stuck	BMW M30 S6 3.2 L	43 (gearbox)
DNS	Group 2	41	(United Kingdom) John Markey Racing	(United Kingdom) John Markey (United Kingdom) Wendy Markey	Mazda RX-3	Engine failed during practice
DNS	Group 2	41	(United Kingdom) John Markey Racing	(United Kingdom) John Markey (United Kingdom) Wendy Markey	Mazda 1126 Rotary	Engine failed during practice
DNS	Group 2	56	(Republic of Ireland) Derek McMahon	(Republic of Ireland) Derek McMahon (Republic of Ireland) Alec Poole	Ford Escort	Did not start
DNS	Group 2	56	(Republic of Ireland) Derek McMahon	(Republic of Ireland) Derek McMahon (Republic of Ireland) Alec Poole	Ford BDG S4 2.0 L	Did not start
DNS	Group 5	5	(France) Jean-Claude Aubriet	(France) Jean-Claude Aubriet (France) "Depnic"	BMW 3.0 CSL	Accident during practice
DNS	Group 5	5	(France) Jean-Claude Aubriet	(France) Jean-Claude Aubriet (France) "Depnic"	BMW S6 3.5 L	Accident during practice
