= 1976 6 Hours of Mugello =

Group 5 auto race in Italy

Layout of the Mugello Circuit

The 1976 Six Hours of Mugello was the opening round of the 1976 World Championship for Makes. It took place at the Mugello Circuit, Italy on 21 March 1976. It was the first race with the participation of the new "Group 5" cars, also known as "Silhouettes".

== Official results ==
Class winners in bold. Cars failing to complete 75% of the winner's distance marked as Not Classified (NC).

Pos	Class	No	Team	Drivers	Chassis	Laps
Pos	Class	No	Team	Drivers	Engine	Laps
**1**	**Group 5**	**4**	**(Germany) Martini Racing-Porsche**	**(Germany) Jochen Mass (Belgium) Jacky Ickx**	**Porsche 935**	**174**
**1**	**Group 5**	**4**	**(Germany) Martini Racing-Porsche**	**(Germany) Jochen Mass (Belgium) Jacky Ickx**	Porsche Type 935 Turbo Flat-6 2,8L	**174**
2	Group 5	5	(Germany) Kremer Racing	(France) Bob Wollek (Germany) Hans Heyer	Porsche 935	168
2	Group 5	5	(Germany) Kremer Racing	(France) Bob Wollek (Germany) Hans Heyer	Porsche Type 935 Turbo Flat-6 2,8L	168
**3**	**Group 4**	**7**	**(Germany) Egon Evertz**	**(Finland) Leo Kinnunen (Germany) Egon Evertz**	**Porsche 934**	**162**
**3**	**Group 4**	**7**	**(Germany) Egon Evertz**	**(Finland) Leo Kinnunen (Germany) Egon Evertz**	Porsche Type 911 Turbo Flat-6 3,0L	**162**
4	Group 5	23	(Germany) Joest Racing	(Germany) Reinhold Joest (Germany) Jürgen Barth (Germany) Wilhelm Bartels	Porsche 911 RSR	161
4	Group 5	23	(Germany) Joest Racing	(Germany) Reinhold Joest (Germany) Jürgen Barth (Germany) Wilhelm Bartels	Porsche Type 911 Turbo Flat-6 3,0L	161
5	Group 5	22	(Sweden) Kenneth Leim	(Sweden) Kenneth Leim (Sweden) Kurt Simonsen	Porsche 911 RSR	157
5	Group 5	22	(Sweden) Kenneth Leim	(Sweden) Kenneth Leim (Sweden) Kurt Simonsen	Porsche Type 911 Turbo Flat-6 3,0L	157
6	Group 4	18	(Germany) Georg Loos	(Germany) Rolf Stommelen (Australia) Tim Schenken	Porsche 934	155
6	Group 4	18	(Germany) Georg Loos	(Germany) Rolf Stommelen (Australia) Tim Schenken	Porsche Type 911 Turbo Flat-6 3,0L	155
7	Group 4	9	(Italy) Brescia Corse	(Italy) Girolamo Capra (Italy) Angelino Lepri (Italy) Gabriele Gottifredi	Porsche 934	154
7	Group 4	9	(Italy) Brescia Corse	(Italy) Girolamo Capra (Italy) Angelino Lepri (Italy) Gabriele Gottifredi	Porsche Type 911 Turbo Flat-6 3,0L	154
8	Group 5	2	(Germany) Hermetite BMW	(United Kingdom) John Fitzpatrick (United Kingdom) Tom Walkinshaw	BMW 3.0CSL	151
8	Group 5	2	(Germany) Hermetite BMW	(United Kingdom) John Fitzpatrick (United Kingdom) Tom Walkinshaw	BMW S6 3,5 L	151
9	Group 5	34	(Italy) Jolly Club	(Italy) Walter Donà (Italy) Giovanni Lise (Italy) Martino Finotto	Ford Escort	148
9	Group 5	34	(Italy) Jolly Club	(Italy) Walter Donà (Italy) Giovanni Lise (Italy) Martino Finotto	Ford BDG S4 2,0L	148
10	Group 5	3	(Germany) Alpina	(Germany) Harald Grohs (United States) Sam Posey	BMW 3.0CSL	147
10	Group 5	3	(Germany) Alpina	(Germany) Harald Grohs (United States) Sam Posey	BMW S6 3,5 L	147
11	Group 5	33	(Italy) Ciro Nappi	(Italy) Ciro Nappi (Italy) Riccardo Ricci	BMW 2002	144
11	Group 5	33	(Italy) Ciro Nappi	(Italy) Ciro Nappi (Italy) Riccardo Ricci	BMW M10 S4 2,0L	144
12	Group 5	31	(Italy) Giada Auto	(Italy) Ferruccio Caliceti (Italy) Carlo Brunner	Alpine Renault	139
12	Group 5	31	(Italy) Giada Auto	(Italy) Ferruccio Caliceti (Italy) Carlo Brunner	Renault-Gordini S4 1,6L	139
DNF	Group 5	1	(Germany) Schnitzer Motorsport	(United States) Brian Redman (Austria) Dieter Quester (Germany) Albrecht Krebs	BMW 3.0CSL	169
DNF	Group 5	1	(Germany) Schnitzer Motorsport	(United States) Brian Redman (Austria) Dieter Quester (Germany) Albrecht Krebs	BMW S6 3,5 L	169
NC	Group 5	37	(Italy) Città dei Mille	(Italy) Duilio Ghislotti (Switzerland) Romeo Camathias	Alfa Romeo GTV	118
NC	Group 5	37	(Italy) Città dei Mille	(Italy) Duilio Ghislotti (Switzerland) Romeo Camathias	Alfa Romeo S4 2,0L	118
DNF	Group 5	3	(Italy) Mario Ruoso	(Italy) Mario Ruoso (Italy) Paolo de Leonibus	Ford Escort	86
DNF	Group 5	3	(Italy) Mario Ruoso	(Italy) Mario Ruoso (Italy) Paolo de Leonibus	Ford BDG S4 2,0L	86
DNF	Group 4	24	(Italy) Jolly Club	(Italy) Emilio Paleari (Italy) Carlo Facetti (Italy) Riccardo Ricci	lancia Stratos	81
DNF	Group 4	24	(Italy) Jolly Club	(Italy) Emilio Paleari (Italy) Carlo Facetti (Italy) Riccardo Ricci	Ferrari V6 2,4 Turbo	81
DNF	Group 5	42	(Italy) Scuderia Vesuvio	(Italy) Carlo Giorgio (Italy) Cosimo Turizio	Ford Escort	62
DNF	Group 5	42	(Italy) Scuderia Vesuvio	(Italy) Carlo Giorgio (Italy) Cosimo Turizio	Ford BDG S4 2,0L	62
DNF	Group 4	19	(Germany) Georg Loos	(Netherlands) Toine Hezemans (Germany) Clemens Schickentanz	Porsche 930	60
DNF	Group 4	19	(Germany) Georg Loos	(Netherlands) Toine Hezemans (Germany) Clemens Schickentanz	Porsche Type 911 Turbo Flat-6 3,0L	60
DNF	Group 3	16	(Sweden) Zip-Up Racing	(Sweden) Reine Wisell (Italy) Arturo Merzario (United Kingdom) Stuart Graham	Chevrolet Camaro Z	52
DNF	Group 3	16	(Sweden) Zip-Up Racing	(Sweden) Reine Wisell (Italy) Arturo Merzario (United Kingdom) Stuart Graham	Chevrolet V8 5,7l	52
DNF	Group 3	15	(Sweden) Zip-Up Racing	(United Kingdom) Stuart Graham (Sweden) Reine Wisell (Sweden) Toblasson	Chevrolet Camaro Z	52
DNF	Group 3	15	(Sweden) Zip-Up Racing	(United Kingdom) Stuart Graham (Sweden) Reine Wisell (Sweden) Toblasson	Chevrolet V8 5,7l	52
DNF	Group 5	32	(Italy) Jolly Club	(Italy) Martino Finotto (Italy) Umberto Grano (Italy) Renzo Zorzi	Ford Escort	33
DNF	Group 5	32	(Italy) Jolly Club	(Italy) Martino Finotto (Italy) Umberto Grano (Italy) Renzo Zorzi	Ford BDG S4 2,0L	33
DNF	Group 5	38	(Italy) Piercarlo Ghinzani	(Italy) Piercarlo Ghinzani (Italy) GiovannI Cùarminati	Porsche 914	32
DNF	Group 5	38	(Italy) Piercarlo Ghinzani	(Italy) Piercarlo Ghinzani (Italy) GiovannI Cùarminati	Porsche S4 1,8L	32
DNF	Group 4	14	(Italy) Jolly Club	(Italy) Giorgio Schon (Italy) Giuseppe Bianco (Italy) Giorgio Gargano	Porsche 930	7
DNF	Group 4	14	(Italy) Jolly Club	(Italy) Giorgio Schon (Italy) Giuseppe Bianco (Italy) Giorgio Gargano	Porsche Type 911 Turbo Flat-6 3,0L	7
DNF	Group 5	25	(Italy) Michele di Gioia	(Italy) Lella Lombardi (Italy) Michele di Gioia (Italy) Giorgio Gargano	Porsche 911 RSR	5
DNF	Group 5	25	(Italy) Michele di Gioia	(Italy) Lella Lombardi (Italy) Michele di Gioia (Italy) Giorgio Gargano	Porsche Type 911 Turbo Flat-6 3,0L	5
DNS	Group 5	21	(Italy) Lancia	(Italy) Carlo Facetti (Italy) Vittorio Brambilla	lancia Stratos	0
DNS	Group 5	21	(Italy) Lancia	(Italy) Carlo Facetti (Italy) Vittorio Brambilla	Ferrari V6 2,4 Turbo	0
