= 1976 6 Hours of Vallelunga =

Second round of 1976 World Championship for sportscar racing

Vallelunga Circuit (1963-2004)

The 1976 Six Hours of Vallelunga was the second round of the 1976 World Championship for Makes. It took place at the Vallelunga Circuit, Italy on 4 April 1976 and was contested by Group 5 Special Production Cars and Group 4 Grand Touring Cars.

== Official results ==
Pos	Class	No	Team	Drivers	Chassis	Laps
Pos	Class	No	Team	Drivers	Engine	Laps
1	Group 5	1	(Germany) Martini Racing-Porsche	(Germany) Jochen Mass (Belgium) Jacky Ickx	Porsche 935	269
1	Group 5	1	(Germany) Martini Racing-Porsche	(Germany) Jochen Mass (Belgium) Jacky Ickx	Porsche Type 935 Turbo Flat-6 2,8L	269
2	Group 5	5	(Germany) Alpina	(Germany) Harald Grohs (United States) Sam Posey (Belgium) Hughes de Fierlant	BMW 3.0CSL	254
2	Group 5	5	(Germany) Alpina	(Germany) Harald Grohs (United States) Sam Posey (Belgium) Hughes de Fierlant	BMW S6 3,5 L	254
3	Group 5	23	(Sweden) Kenneth Leim	(Sweden) Kenneth Leim (Sweden) Kurt Simonsen	Porsche 911 RSR	245
3	Group 5	23	(Sweden) Kenneth Leim	(Sweden) Kenneth Leim (Sweden) Kurt Simonsen	Porsche Type 911 Turbo Flat-6 3,0L	245
4	Group 5	4	(Germany) Hermetite BMW	(United Kingdom) John Fitzpatrick (United Kingdom) Tom Walkinshaw	BMW 3.0CSL	243
4	Group 5	4	(Germany) Hermetite BMW	(United Kingdom) John Fitzpatrick (United Kingdom) Tom Walkinshaw	BMW S6 3,5 L	243
5	Group 4	12	(Italy) Jolly Club	(Italy) Giorgio Schon (Italy) Giuseppe Bianco; Tommasi	Porsche 934	242
5	Group 4	12	(Italy) Jolly Club	(Italy) Giorgio Schon (Italy) Giuseppe Bianco; Tommasi	Porsche Type 911 Turbo Flat-6 3,0L	242
6	Group 5	29	(Italy) Michele di Gioia	(Italy) Vittorio Bernasconi (Italy) Michele di Gioia	Porsche 911 RSR	241
6	Group 5	29	(Italy) Michele di Gioia	(Italy) Vittorio Bernasconi (Italy) Michele di Gioia	Porsche Type 911 Turbo Flat-6 3,0L	241
7	Group 4	9	(Italy) Brescia Corse	(Italy) Girolamo Capra (Italy) Ruggero Parpinelli (Italy) Gabriele Gottifredi	Porsche 934	238
7	Group 4	9	(Italy) Brescia Corse	(Italy) Girolamo Capra (Italy) Ruggero Parpinelli (Italy) Gabriele Gottifredi	Porsche Type 911 Turbo Flat-6 3,0L	238
8	Group 4	24	(Italy) Jolly Club	(Italy) Renzo Zorzi (Italy) Riccardo Ricci	Lancia Stratos	238
8	Group 4	24	(Italy) Jolly Club	(Italy) Renzo Zorzi (Italy) Riccardo Ricci	Ferrari V6 2,4L	238
9	Group 5	11	(Italy) Brescia Corse	(Italy) Maurizio Micangeli (Italy) Carlo Pietromarchi (Italy) Mario Radicella	De Tomaso Pantera	238
9	Group 5	11	(Italy) Brescia Corse	(Italy) Maurizio Micangeli (Italy) Carlo Pietromarchi (Italy) Mario Radicella	Ford V8 5,8L	238
10	Group 5	14	(Germany) Georg Loos	(Italy) Franco Bernabei (Italy) Gianluigi Picchi	Porsche 911 RSR	229
10	Group 5	14	(Germany) Georg Loos	(Italy) Franco Bernabei (Italy) Gianluigi Picchi	Porsche Type 911 Turbo Flat-6 3,0L	229
11	Group 5	36	(Italy) Jolly Club	(Italy) Federico D'Amore (Switzerland) Romeo Camathias (Italy) Martino Finotto	Ford Escort	229
11	Group 5	36	(Italy) Jolly Club	(Italy) Federico D'Amore (Switzerland) Romeo Camathias (Italy) Martino Finotto	Ford BDG S4 2,0L	229
NC	Group 4	8	(France) Louis Meznarie	(France) Hubert Striebig (France) Anne-Charlotte Verney	Posche 934	227
NC	Group 4	8	(France) Louis Meznarie	(France) Hubert Striebig (France) Anne-Charlotte Verney	Porsche Type 911 Turbo Flat-6 3,0L	227
12	Group 5	34	(Italy) Mario Ruoso	(Italy) Mario Ruoso (Italy) "Pal Joe"	Ford Escort	223
12	Group 5	34	(Italy) Mario Ruoso	(Italy) Mario Ruoso (Italy) "Pal Joe"	Ford BDG S4 2,0L	223
13	Group 5	25	(Italy) Brescia Corse	(Italy) Mario Radicella (Italy) Germano Nataloni	Porsche 911 RSR	202
13	Group 5	25	(Italy) Brescia Corse	(Italy) Mario Radicella (Italy) Germano Nataloni	Porsche Type 911 Turbo Flat-6 3,0L	202
DNF	Group 5	21	(Italy) Lancia Corse	(Italy) Vittorio Brambilla (Italy) Carlo Facetti	Lancia Stratos	185
DNF	Group 5	21	(Italy) Lancia Corse	(Italy) Vittorio Brambilla (Italy) Carlo Facetti	Ferrari V6 2,4L Turbo	185
DNF	Group 5	2	(Germany) Schnitzer Motorsport	(Austria) Dieter Quester (Germany) Albrecht Krebs	BMW 3.0CSL	169
DNF	Group 5	2	(Germany) Schnitzer Motorsport	(Austria) Dieter Quester (Germany) Albrecht Krebs	BMW S6 3,5 L	169
DNF	Group 4	7	(Germany) Egon Evertz	(Finland) Leo Kinnunen (Germany) Egon Evertz	Porsche 934	125
DNF	Group 4	7	(Germany) Egon Evertz	(Finland) Leo Kinnunen (Germany) Egon Evertz	Porsche Type 911 Turbo Flat-6 3,0L	125
DNF	Group 5	35	(Italy) Scuderia Vesuvio	(Italy) Cosimo Turizio (Italy) Carlo Giorgio	Ford Escort	76
DNF	Group 5	35	(Italy) Scuderia Vesuvio	(Italy) Cosimo Turizio (Italy) Carlo Giorgio	Ford BDG S4 2,0L	76
DNF	Group 5	27	(Italy) Jolly Club	(Italy) Pelit (Italy) Sergio Rombolotti (Italy) Giorgio Schon	Porsche 911 RSR	48
DNF	Group 5	27	(Italy) Jolly Club	(Italy) Pelit (Italy) Sergio Rombolotti (Italy) Giorgio Schon	Porsche Type 911 Turbo Flat-6 3,0L	48
DNF	Group 5	33	(Italy) Ciro Nappi	(Italy) Cosimo Turizio (Italy) Ciro Nappi (Italy) Riccardo Ricci	BMW 2002	35
DNF	Group 5	33	(Italy) Ciro Nappi	(Italy) Cosimo Turizio (Italy) Ciro Nappi (Italy) Riccardo Ricci	BMW M10 S4 2,0L	35
DNF	Group 5	32	(Italy) Jolly Club	(Italy) Martino Finotto (Italy) Umberto Grano (Italy) Renzo Zorzi	Ford Escort	33
DNF	Group 5	32	(Italy) Jolly Club	(Italy) Martino Finotto (Italy) Umberto Grano (Italy) Renzo Zorzi	Ford BDG S4 2,0L	33
DNF	Group 5	3	(Germany) Kremer Racing	(France) Bob Wollek (Germany) Hans Heyer	Porsche 935	26
DNF	Group 5	3	(Germany) Kremer Racing	(France) Bob Wollek (Germany) Hans Heyer	Porsche Type 935 Turbo Flat-6 2,8L	26
DNF	Group 5	31	(Italy) Jolly Club	(Italy) Claudio Francisci (Italy) Maurizio Gellini	Alfa Romeo GTV	6
DNF	Group 5	31	(Italy) Jolly Club	(Italy) Claudio Francisci (Italy) Maurizio Gellini	Alfa Romeo S4 2,0L	6
NC	Group 4	15	(Italy) "Spiffero"	(Italy) "Spiffero" (Italy) Roberto Nardini	De Tomaso Pantera	1
NC	Group 4	15	(Italy) "Spiffero"	(Italy) "Spiffero" (Italy) Roberto Nardini	Ford V8 5,8L	1
DNS	Group 5	22	(Italy) "Pal Joe"	(Italy) Arturo Merzario (Italy) "Pal Joe"	BMW 2002	0
DNS	Group 5	22	(Italy) "Pal Joe"	(Italy) Arturo Merzario (Italy) "Pal Joe"	BMW M10 S4 2,0L	0
