= 1976 World Championship for Sports Cars =

Racing tournament

1976 World Championship for Makes season

Seasons
- ← 1975 1977 →

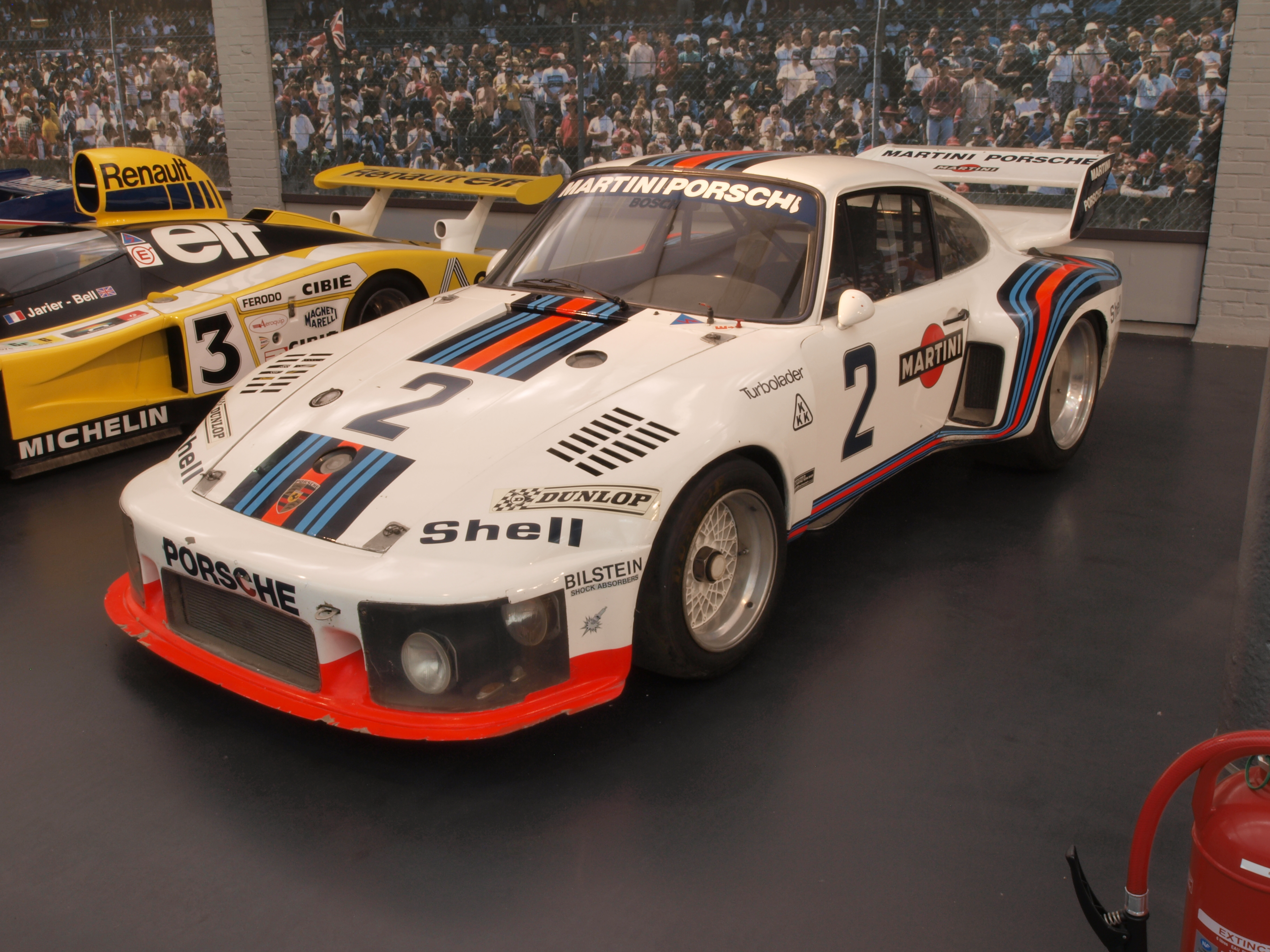
Porsche won the championship with the Porsche 935 (pictured in 2010).

The 1976 World Championship for Makes was part of the 24th season of FIA World Sportscar Championship motor racing. It was a series for production based cars from the following FIA categories:

- Group 5 Special Production Cars
- Group 4 Special Grand Touring Cars
- Group 3 Series Production Grand Touring Cars
- Group 2 Touring Cars
- Group 1 Series Production Touring Cars

The series ran from 21 March 1976 to 4 September 1976, and comprised seven races in total.

The championship was won by Porsche.

== World Sportscar Championship ==
Following the 1975 season, the FIA chose to divide the World Championship into two series that would run simultaneously but separately. Open-cockpit sportscars (formerly known as FIA Group 5 Sports Cars, now officially FIA Group 6 Two-Seater Racing Cars) would transfer from the World Championship for Makes to a new World Championship for Sports Cars, while production-based cars (such as the new Group 5 Special Production Cars) would contest the World Championship for Makes. Events in which both types of car ran, such as the 24 Hours of Le Mans, were not counted towards either championship.

== World Championship for Makes ==
=== Schedule ===
Rnd	Race	Circuit	Date
1	(Italy) March Trophy (6 Hours)	Mugello Circuit	21 March
2	(Italy) Trofeo Ignazio Giunti (6 Hours)	Vallelunga	4 April
3	(United Kingdom) 6 Hours of Silverstone	Silverstone Circuit	9 May
4	(Germany) ADAC 1000km Nürburgring	Nürburgring	30 May
5	(Austria) Martha 1000 (6 Hours)	Österreichring	27 June
6	(United States) 6 Hours of Watkins Glen	Watkins Glen International	10 July
7	(France) ACF 6 Hours of Dijon	Dijon-Prenois	4 September

=== Race results ===
Rnd	Circuit	Overall winning team	Results
Rnd	Circuit	Overall winning drivers	Results
Rnd	Circuit	Overall winning car	Results
1	Mugello Circuit	(Germany) #4 Martini Racing	Results
1	Mugello Circuit	(Germany) Jochen Mass (Belgium) Jacky Ickx	Results
1	Mugello Circuit	Porsche 935	Results
2	Vallelunga	(Germany) #1 Martini Racing	Results
2	Vallelunga	(Germany) Jochen Mass (Belgium) Jacky Ickx	Results
2	Vallelunga	Porsche 935	Results
3	Silverstone	(United Kingdom) #4 Hermetite BMW	Results
3	Silverstone	(United Kingdom) John Fitzpatrick (United Kingdom) Tom Walkinshaw	Results
3	Silverstone	BMW 3.5 CSL	Results
4	Nürburgring	(Germany) #7 Schnitzer Motorsport	Results
4	Nürburgring	(Germany) Albrecht Krebs (Austria) Dieter Quester	Results
4	Nürburgring	BMW 3.5 CSL	Results
5	Österreichring	(Germany) #12 Schnitzer Motorsport	Results
5	Österreichring	(Austria) Dieter Quester (Sweden) Gunnar Nilsson	Results
5	Österreichring	BMW 3.5 CSL	Results
6	Watkins Glen	(Germany) #4 Martini Racing	Results
6	Watkins Glen	(Germany) Rolf Stommelen (Liechtenstein) Manfred Schurti	Results
6	Watkins Glen	Porsche 935	Results
7	Dijon	(Germany) #1 Martini Racing	Results
7	Dijon	(Germany) Jochen Mass (Belgium) Jacky Ickx	Results
7	Dijon	Porsche 935	Results

=== Championship results ===
Points were awarded to the top 10 finishers in the order of 20-15-12-10-8-6-4-3-2-1. Manufacturers were only given points for their highest finishing car, with any other cars from that manufacturer merely skipped in the points allocation. Only the best 5 points finishes for each make counted towards the championship with any other points earned not included in the totals. Discarded points are shown in the table below within brackets.

Pos	Manufacturer	Rd 1	Rd 2	Rd 3	Rd 4	Rd 5	Rd 6	Rd 7	Total
1	(Germany) Porsche	20	20	(15)	15	(12)	20	20	95
2	(Germany) BMW	(3)	15	20	20	20	10	(6)	85
3	(United States) Ford	2		6					8
4	(Italy) De Tomaso		2			3			5
5=	(Italy) Lancia		3						3
5=	(United Kingdom) MG			3					3

In addition to the outright championship, the FIA also awarded three divisional titles. Division 1 was for cars with an engine capacity of up to 2000cc, Division 2 for cars from 2001 to 3000cc and Division 3 for those above 3000cc.

==== Division 1 ====
Pos	Manufacturer	Rd 1	Rd 2	Rd 3	Rd 4	Rd 5	Rd 6	Rd 7	Total
1	(United States) Ford	20	20	20	-	15	-	-	75
2	(Germany) BMW	15	-	-	20	20	-	-	55
3	(France) Alpine	12	-	-	-	-	-	-	12
4	(Germany) Volkswagen	-	-	-	6	-	-	-	6

==== Division 2 ====
Pos	Manufacturer	Rd 1	Rd 2	Rd 3	Rd 4	Rd 5	Rd 6	Rd 7	Total
1	(Germany) Porsche	(20)	(20)	20	20	20	20	20	100

==== Division 3 ====
Pos	Manufacturer	Rd 1	Rd 2	Rd 3	Rd 4	Rd 5	Rd 6	Rd 7	Total
1	(Germany) Porsche	20	20	(15)	(15)	15	20	20	95
2	(Germany) BMW	(6)	15	20	20	20	10	(6)	85
3	(Italy) De Tomaso	-	6	-	6	6	-	-	18
4	(United Kingdom) MG	-	-	6	-	-	-	-	6
5	(Germany) Opel	-	-	-	4	-	-	-	4
