= BMW E9 =

BMW luxury coupe car

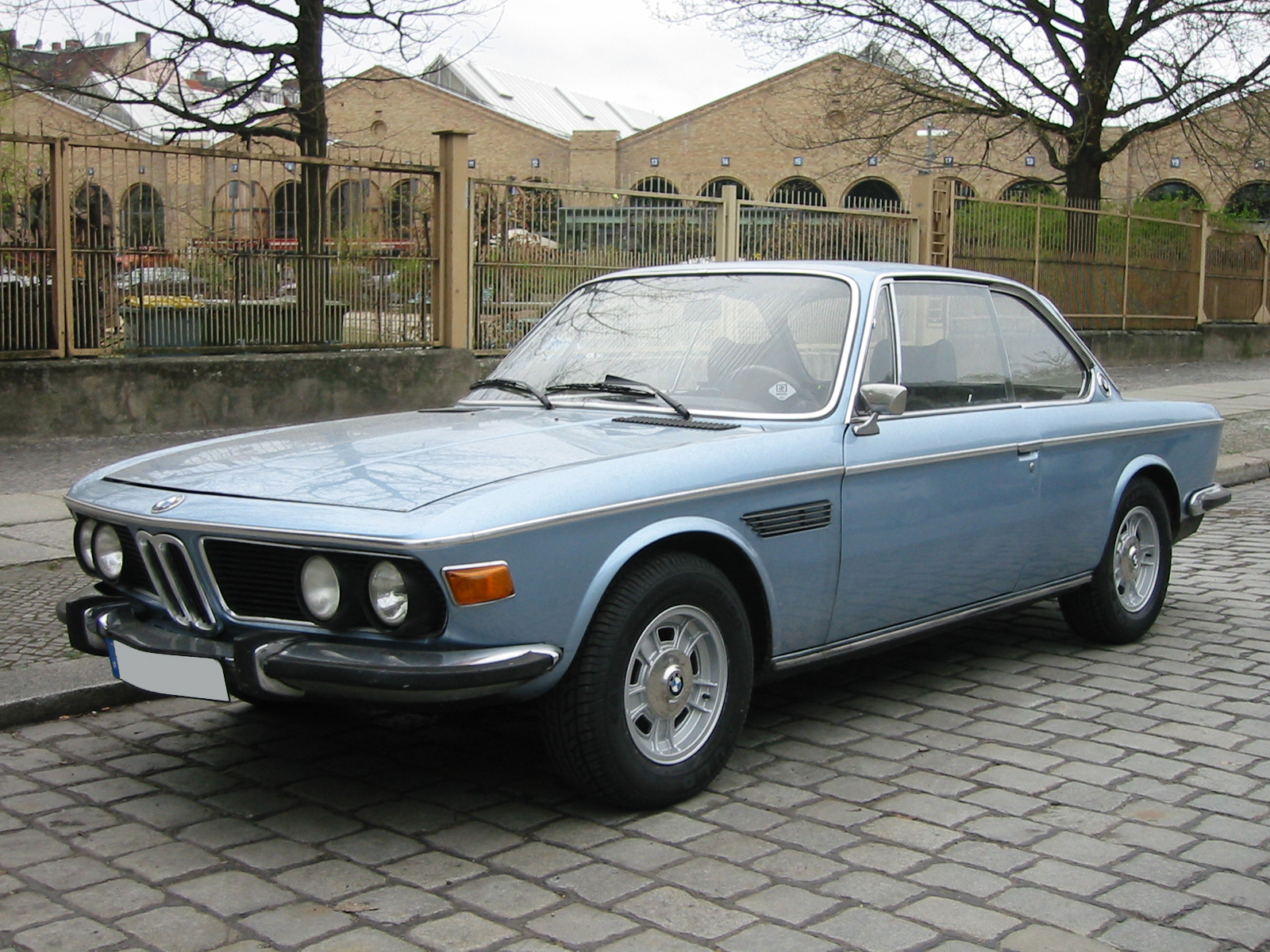

Overview
- Manufacturer: BMW
- Production: 1968–1975
- Assembly: Germany: Rheine (Karmann)
- Designer: Wilhelm Hofmeister

Body and chassis
- Class: Grand tourer
- Body style: Coupé
- Layout: Front-engine, rear-wheel-drive
- Platform: BMW New Class
- Related: BMW E3 (sedans)

Powertrain
- Engine: 2.5-3.2 L M30 I6

Dimensions
- Wheelbase: 2,624 mm (103.3 in)
- Length: 4,660 mm (183.5 in)
- Width: 1,670 mm (65.7 in)
- Height: 1,370 mm (53.9 in)

Chronology
- Predecessor: BMW 2000C / 2000CS
- Successor: BMW 6 Series (E24)

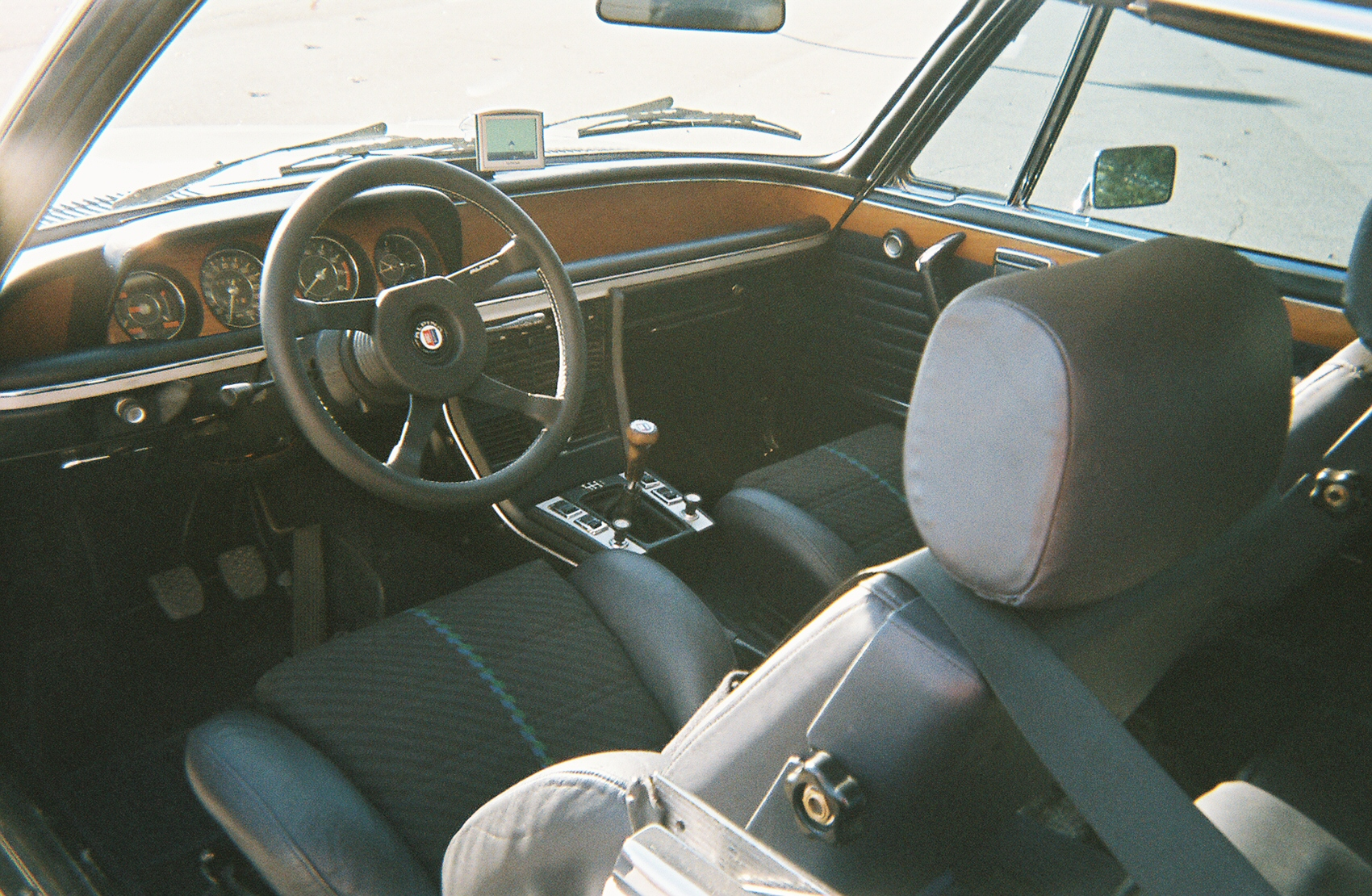
E9 interior (3.0 CS model, with Alpina steering wheel, shift knob and upholstery)

The BMW E9 is a range of coupés produced by German automaker BMW from 1968 to 1975. Initially released as the 2800 CS model, the E9 was based on the BMW 2000 C / 2000 CS four-cylinder coupés, which were enlarged to fit the BMW M30 six-cylinder engine. The E9’s bodywork was built by Karmann.

As a racing car, the E9 was very successful in the European Touring Car Championship and the Deutsche Rennsport Meisterschaft, especially the 3.0 CSL homologation model.

The E9 range was replaced by the E24 6 Series.

== Predecessor ==
The E9's predecessors are the 2000 C and 2000 CS models, which were produced from 1965 to 1969 as part of the BMW New Class range.

== Models ==
=== 2800 CS ===
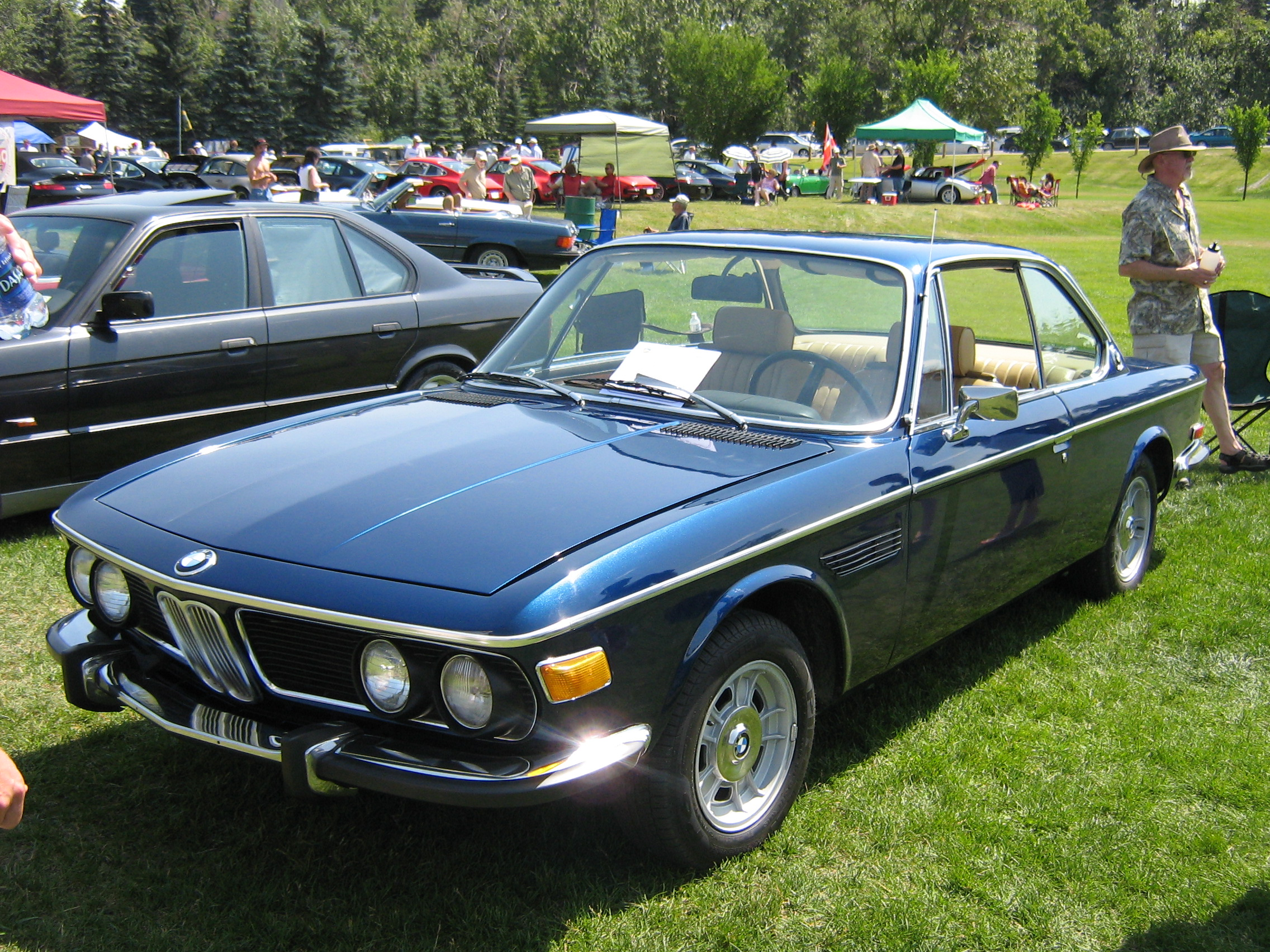
BMW 2800CS

The first of the E9 coupés, the 2800 CS, replaced the 2000 C and 2000 CS in 1968. The lead designer was Wilhelm Hofmeister. The wheelbase and length were increased to allow the engine bay to be long enough to accommodate the new straight-six engine code-named M30, and the front of the car was restyled to resemble the E3 sedan. The rear axle, however, remained the same as that used in the lesser "Neue Klasse" models and the rear brakes were initially drums - meaning that the 2800 saloon was a better performing car, as it was also lighter. The CS' advantages were thus strictly visual to begin with. The 2800 CS used the 2,788 cc (170.1 cu in) version of the engine used in the E3 sedans. The engine produced 125 kW (168 hp) at 6000 rpm.

Not only was the 2800 CS lighter than the preceding 2000 CS, it also had a smaller frontal area, further increasing the performance advantage. The curb weight of the 2800 CS is 1,420 kg (3,131 lb).

At the 1969 Geneva Motor Show, BMW unveiled the "2800 Bertone Spicup" concept car. This model, which has a similar appearance to the 1967 Alfa Romeo Montreal, did not reach production.

=== 3.0 CS/CSi ===
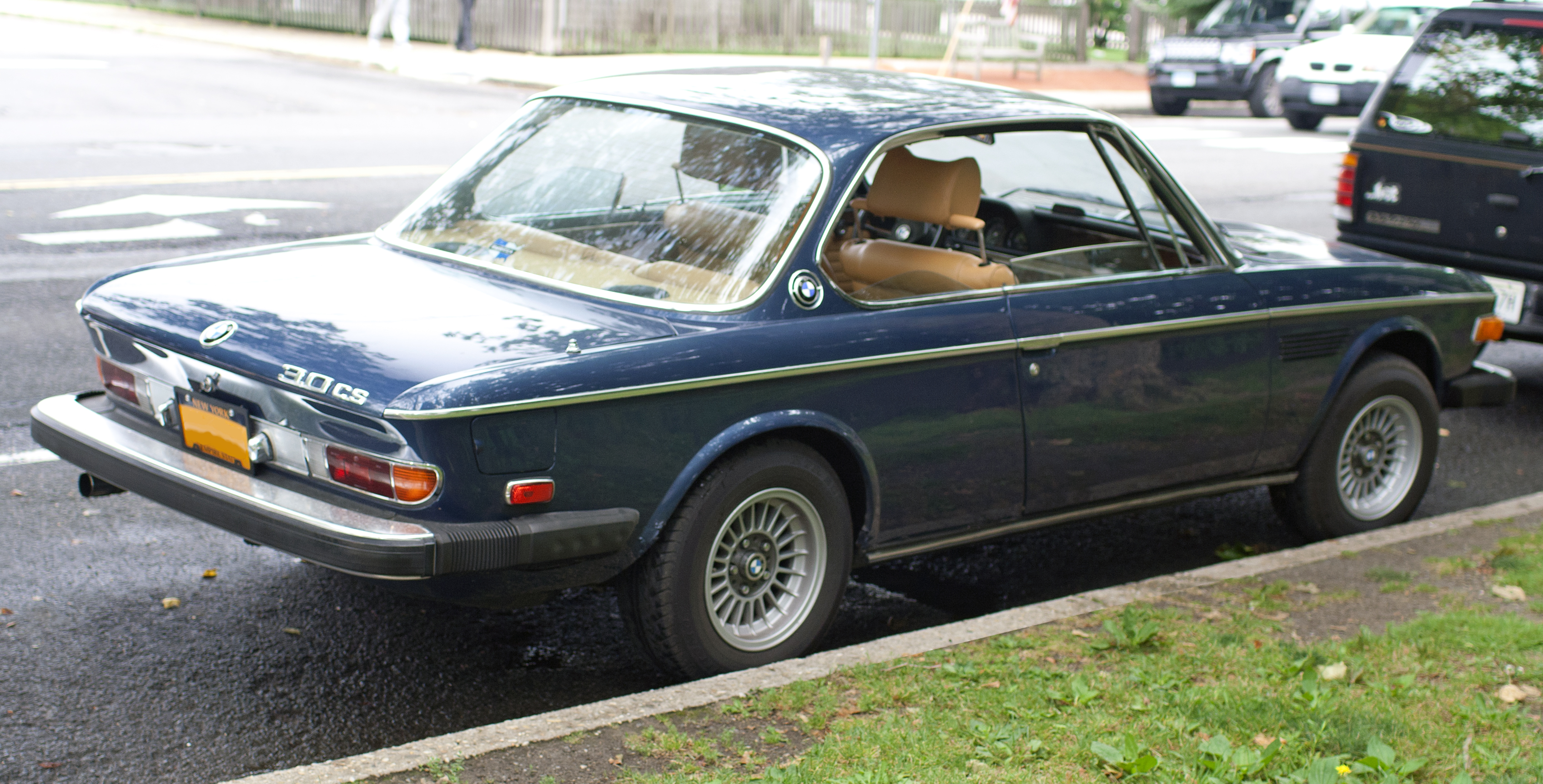
1974 BMW 3.0 CS (U.S. model)

The 2800CS was replaced by the 3.0 CS and 3.0 CSi in 1971, which was bored out to give a displacement of 2,986 cc (182.2 cu in). The 3.0 CS has a 9.0:1 compression ratio, twin carburetors and produces 134 kW (180 hp) at 6000 rpm. The 3.0 CSi has a 9.5:1 compression ratio, Bosch D-Jetronic electronic fuel injection, and produces 149 kW (200 hp) at 5500 rpm. Transmission options were a 4-speed manual or a 3-speed automatic.

In the United States, 1974 models have protruding 5 mile per hour bumpers.

=== 3.0 CSL ===
Introduced in May 1972, the 3.0 CSL was a homologation special built to make the car eligible for racing in the European Touring Car Championship. 1,265 were built.

The "L" in the designation meant leicht (light), unlike in other BMW designations, where it meant lang (long). The lightness was achieved by using thinner steel to build the unit body, deleting the trim and soundproofing, using aluminium alloy doors, bonnet, and boot lid, and using Perspex side windows. The five hundred 3.0 CSLs exported to the United Kingdom were not quite as light as the others, as the importer had insisted on retaining the soundproofing, electric windows, and stock E9 bumpers on these cars. The CSL was not sold in the United States.

Initially using the same engine as the 3.0 CS, the 3.0 CSL was given a very small increase in displacement to 3,003 cc (183.3 cu in) by increasing the engine bore by one quarter of a millimetre to 89.25 mm (3.51 in). This was done in August 1972 to allow the CSL to be raced in the "over three litre" racing category, allowing for some increase in displacement in the racing cars. In 1973, the engine in the 3.0 CSL was given another, more substantial increase in displacement to 3,153 cc (3.2 L; 192.4 cu in) by increasing the stroke to 84 mm (3.31 in), rated at 206 PS (203 hp; 152 kW) at 5600 rpm and 286 N⋅m (211 lb⋅ft) at 4200 rpm of torque . This final version of the 3.0 CSL was homologated in July 1973 along with an aerodynamic package including a large air dam, short fins running along the front fenders, a spoiler above and behind the trailing edge of the roof, and a tall rear wing. The rear wings were not installed at the factory, but were left in the boot for installation after purchase. This was done because the wings were illegal for use on German roads. The full aero package earned the racing CSLs the nickname "Batmobile".

The CSL competed in Group 2 form in the European Touring Car Championship, with CSL drivers winning the Drivers title six times in the years 1973 and 1975 to 1979. The CSL also competed in Group 5 Special Production guise, winning three rounds of the 1976 World Championship for Makes. In FIA Group 4 spec, notably when driven by Hans-Joachim Stuck (car featured in Enthusia Professional Racing), they competed against racing versions of the Porsche 911 and Ford Capri with some success.

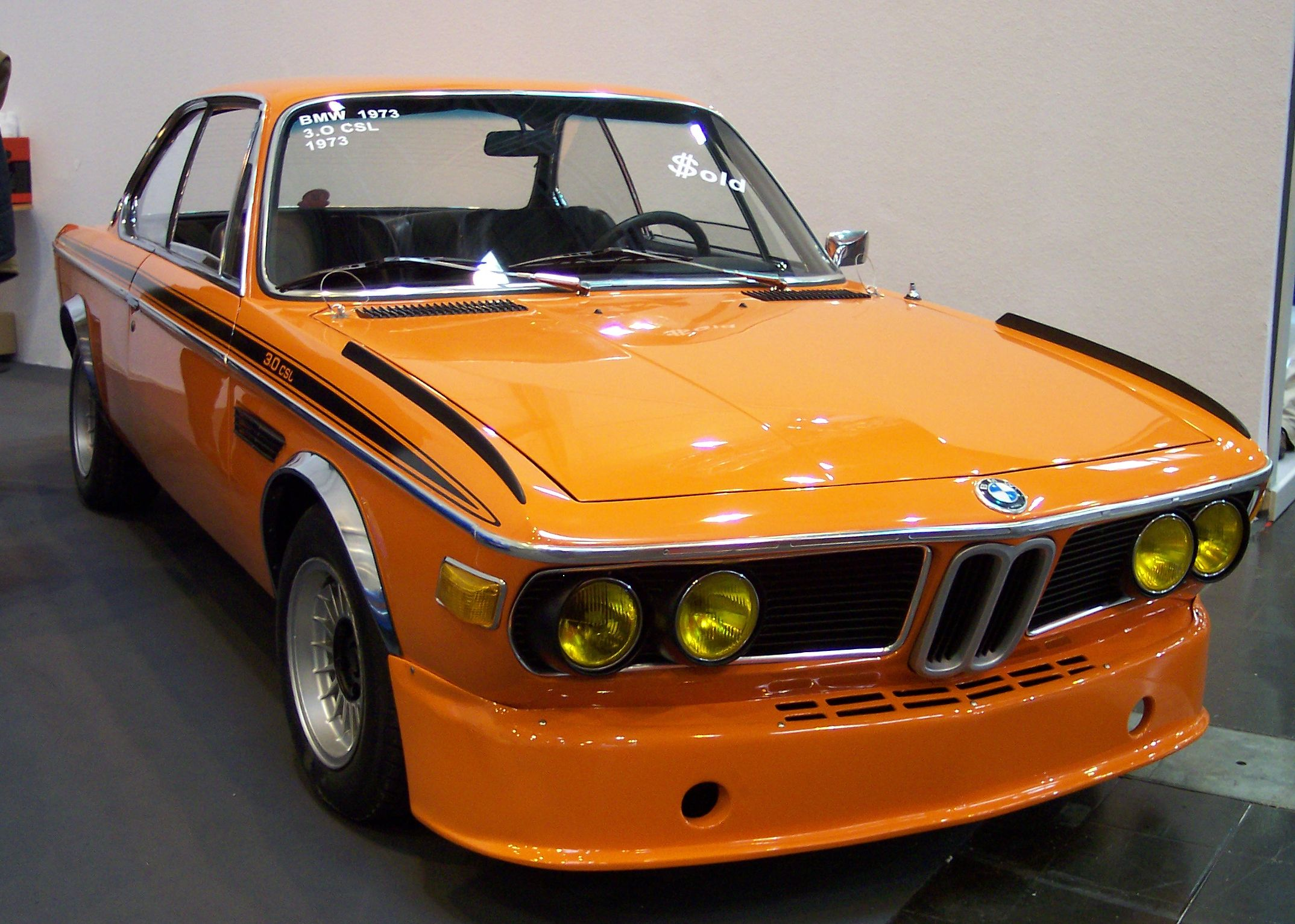

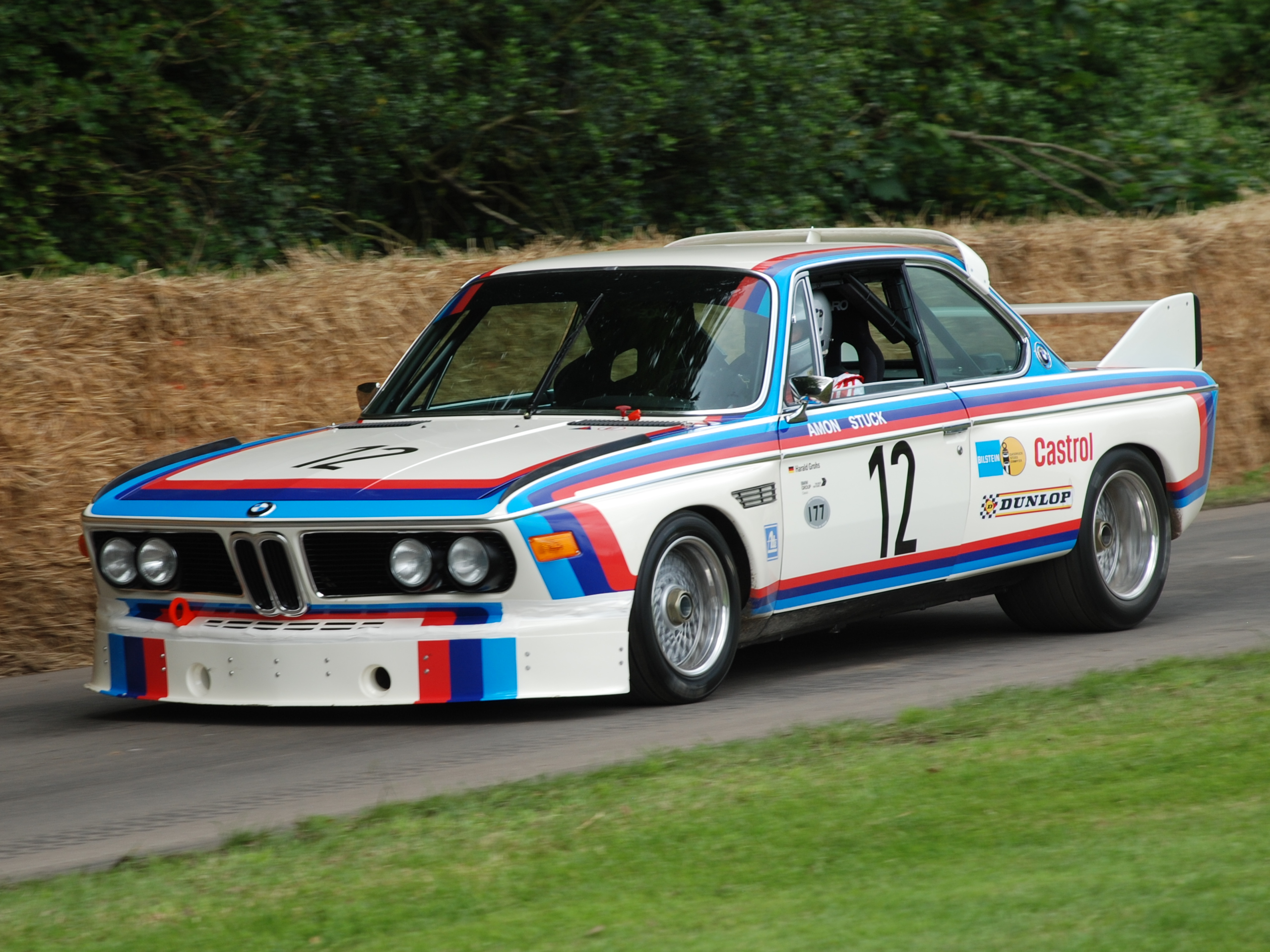

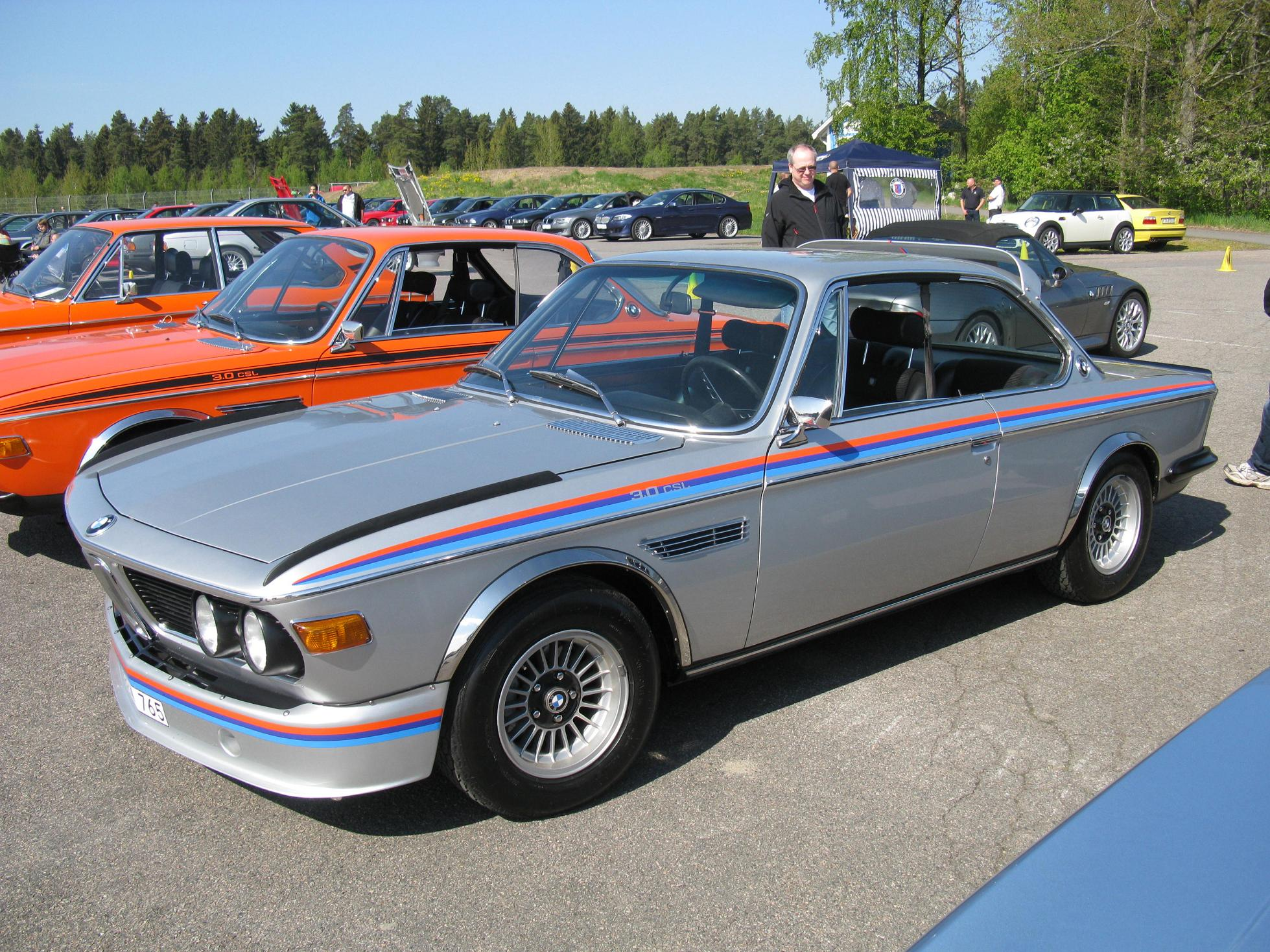

=== 2.5 CS ===
The last version of the E9 to be introduced was the 2.5 CS in 1974. This was a response to the 1973 oil crisis, such that the buyer could choose the smaller, more economical engine. The engine, from the 2500 sedan, displaced 2,494 cc (152.2 cu in) and produced 150 hp (112 kW) at 6000 rpm. Only 874 were made until the end of E9 production in 1975, and none were exported to the United States.

== Engines ==
Model	Years	Engine	Displacement	Power	Torque
2.5 CS	1974-1975	M30B25V SOHC I6	2,494 cc (152.2 cu in)	110 kW (150 PS; 150 bhp) at 6,000 rpm	211 N⋅m (156 lb⋅ft) at 3,700 rpm
2800 CS	1968-1971	M30B28V SOHC I6	2,788 cc (170.1 cu in)	125 kW (170 PS; 168 bhp) at 6,000 rpm	235 N⋅m (173 lb⋅ft) at 3,700 rpm
3.0 CS	1971-1975	M30B30V SOHC I6	2,986 cc (182.2 cu in)	132 kW (180 PS; 178 bhp) at 6,000 rpm	235 N⋅m (173 lb⋅ft) at 3,700 rpm
3.0 CSi	1971-1975	M30B30 SOHC I6	2,986 cc (182.2 cu in)	147 kW (200 PS; 197 bhp) at 5,500 rpm	272 N⋅m (201 lb⋅ft) at 4,300 rpm
3.0 CSL	1971-1972	M30B30V SOHC I6	2,986 cc (182.2 cu in)	132 kW (180 PS; 178 bhp) at 6,000 rpm	235 N⋅m (173 lb⋅ft) at 3,700 rpm
3.0 CSL	1972-1973	M30B30 SOHC I6	3,003 cc (183.3 cu in)	147 kW (200 PS; 197 bhp) at 5,500 rpm	272 N⋅m (201 lb⋅ft) at 4,300 rpm
3.0 CSL	1973-1975	M30B32 SOHC I6	3,153 cc (192.4 cu in)	152 kW (207 PS; 204 bhp) at 5,600 rpm	286 N⋅m (211 lb⋅ft) at 4,200 rpm

== Motorsport ==
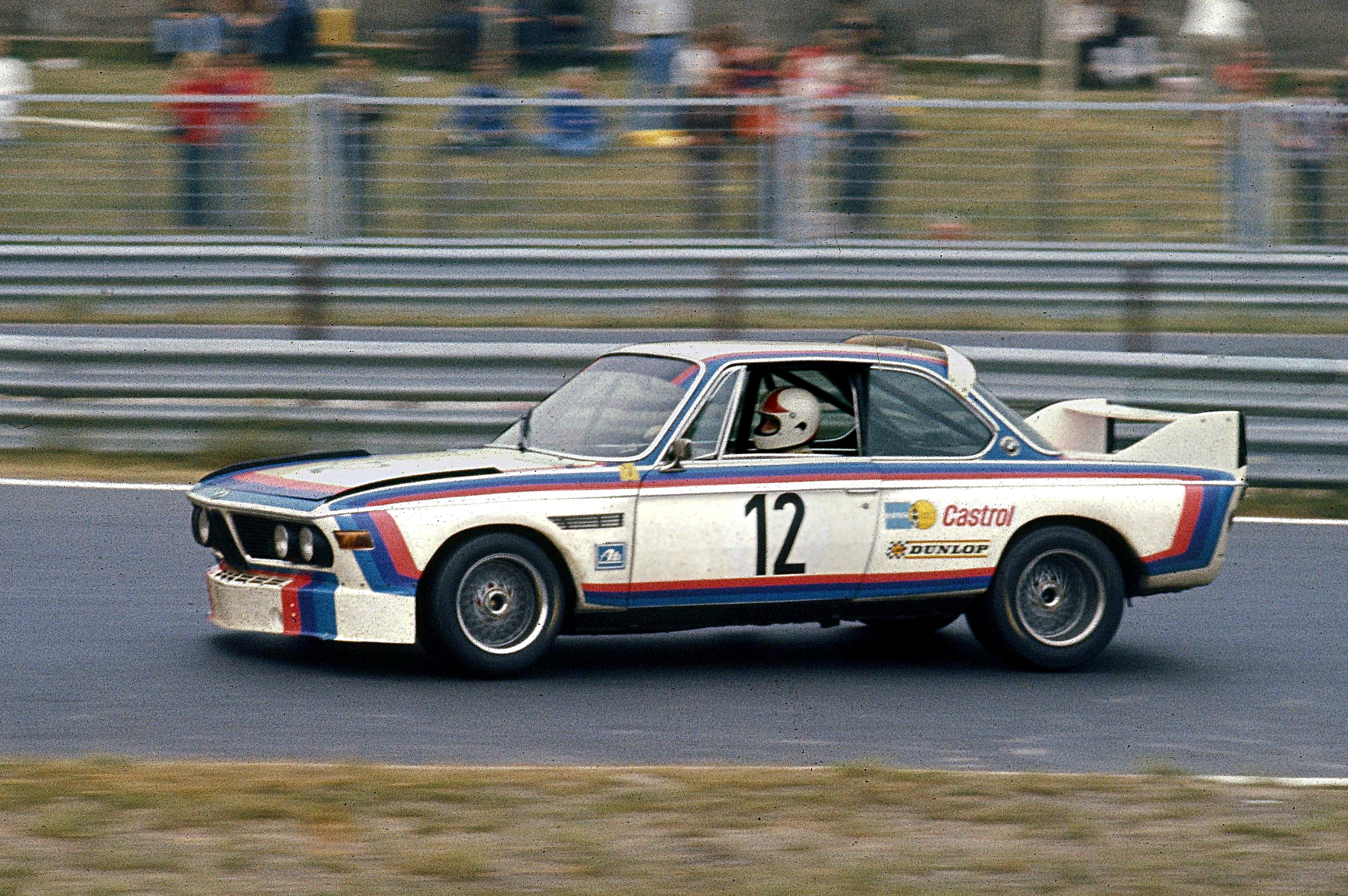
1973 BMW 3.0 CSL

In 1973, Toine Hezemans won the European Touring Car Championship in a 3.0 CSL and co-drove a 3.0 CSL with Dieter Quester to a class victory at Le Mans. Hezemans and Quester had driven to second place at the 1973 German Touring Car Grand Prix at Nürburgring, being beaten only by Chris Amon and Hans-Joachim Stuck in another 3.0 CSL. 3.0 CSLs would win the European Touring Car Championship again in every year from 1975 to 1979.

The 3.0 CSL was raced in the 1975 IMSA GT Championship, with Sam Posey, Brian Redman, and Ronnie Peterson winning races during the season.

The 3.5 CSL was built for Group 5 racing and BMW won three races in the 1976 World Championship for Makes with this model.

== Art Cars ==
The first two BMW Art Cars were 3.0 CSLs; the first was painted by Alexander Calder and the second by Frank Stella.

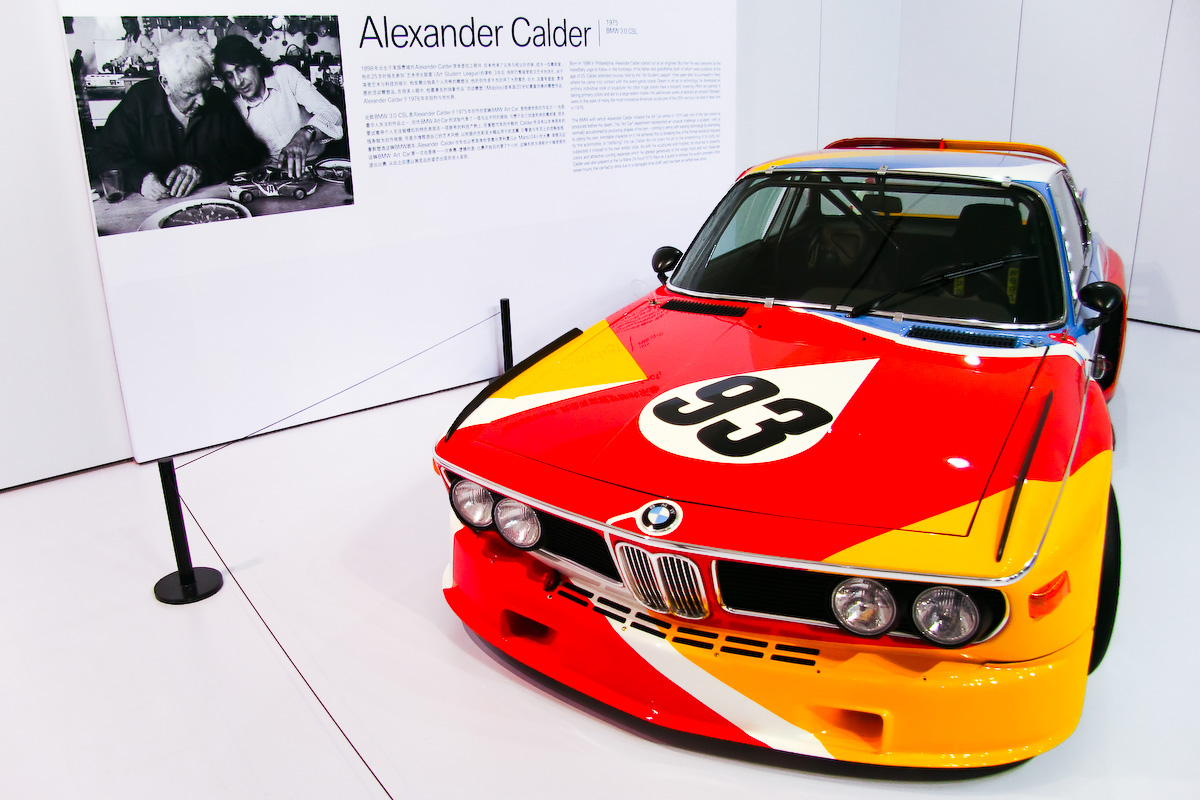
3.0 CSL painted by Alexander Calder

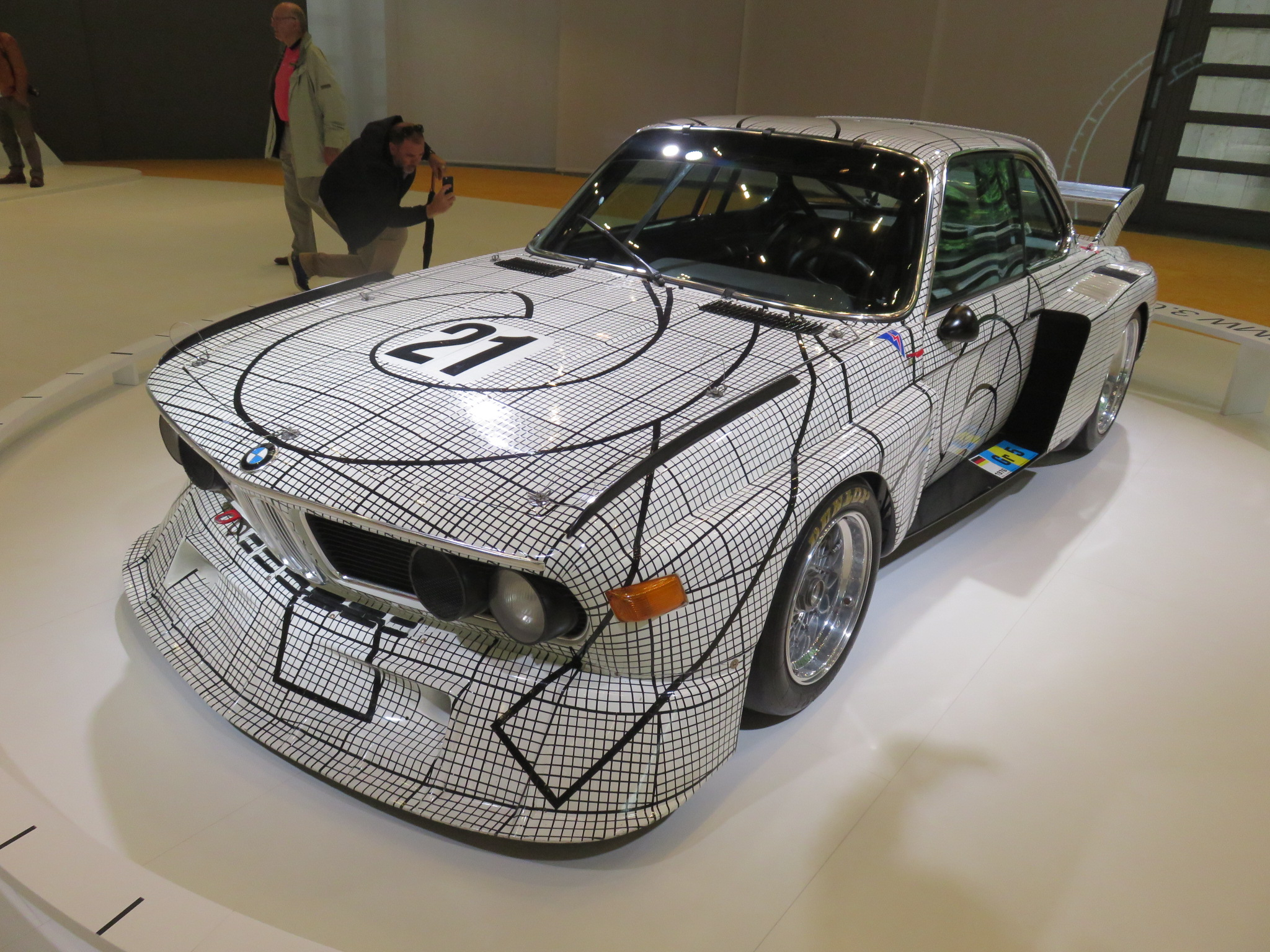
3.0 CSL painted by Frank Stella

== Production numbers ==
Production numbers for BMW E9 by model and year
Model/year	1968	1969	1970	1971	1972	1973	1974	1975	Total
2800 CS	138	2534	3335	276					6283
2800 CSA		787	1089	73					1949
3.0 CS				1974	1172	779	267	263	4455
3.0 CSA				520	1215	1169	355	408	3667
3.0 CSi				1061	2999	2741	579	555	7935
3.0 CSiA					2				2
3.0 CSi RHD						66	128	13	207
3.0 CSiA RHD						69	139	7	215
3.0 CSL				169	252	287	40	17	765
3.0 CSL RHD					349	151			500
2.5 CS							272	328	600
2.5 CSA							101	143	244
2800 CS USA		43	415	183					641
2800 CSA USA		36	403	87					526
3.0 CS USA				132	411	450	375		1368
3.0 CSA USA				60	377	314	438		1189
Total E9 Production	138	3400	5242	4535	6777	6026	2694	1734	30,546

== 2015 3.0 CSL Hommage ==
In 2015, BMW introduced the 3.0 CSL Hommage concept car at the Concorso d'Eleganza Villa d'Este as a tribute to the 3.0 CSL. It has an inline-six engine with an eBoost hybrid system in the rear of the car. As a homage to the original, the 3.0 CSL Hommage has a minimal interior to keep the weight as low as possible; carbon fibre and aluminium are used in the interior for the same reason. The Hommage has Laser-LED lights similar to those in the i8.

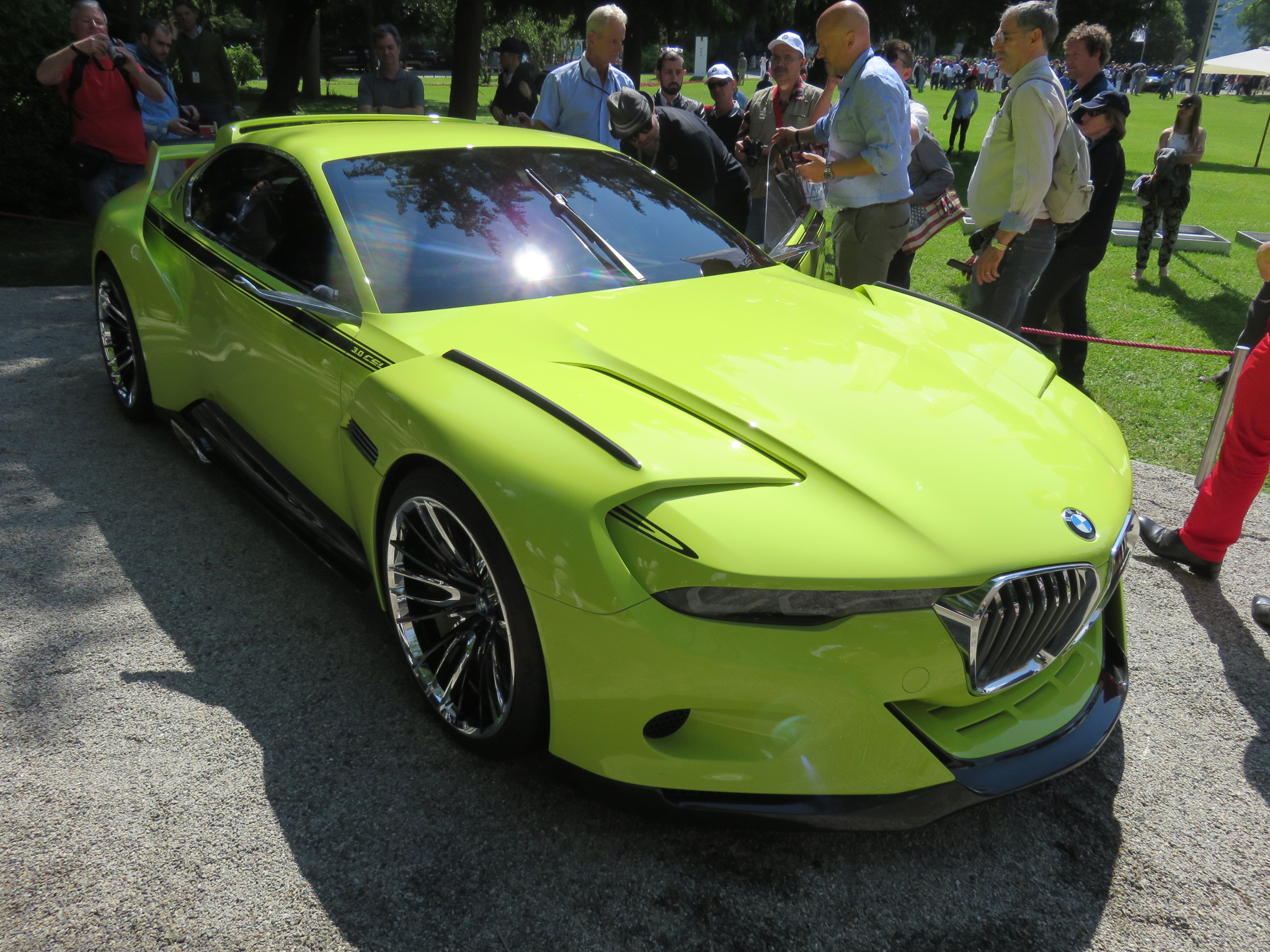

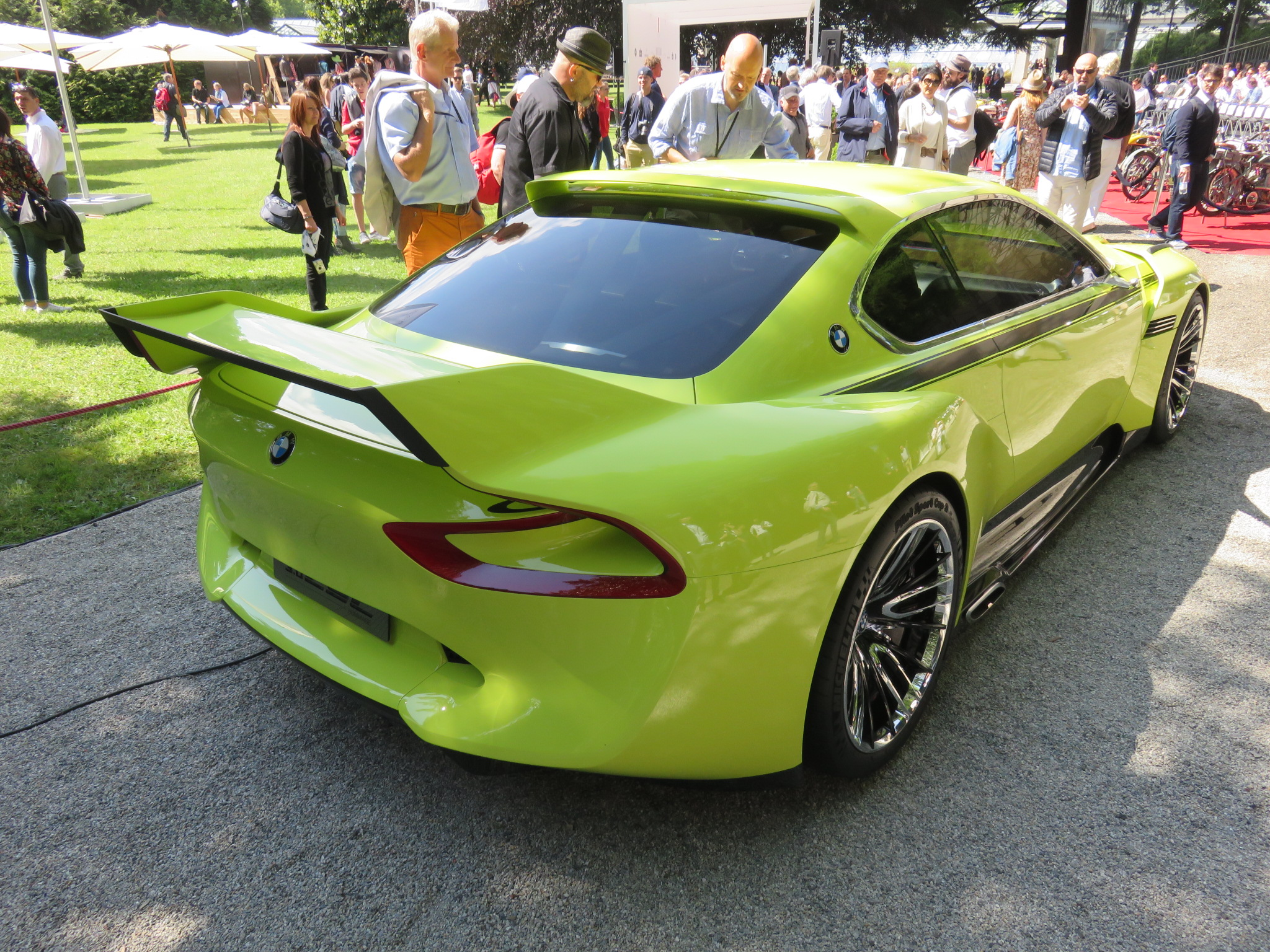

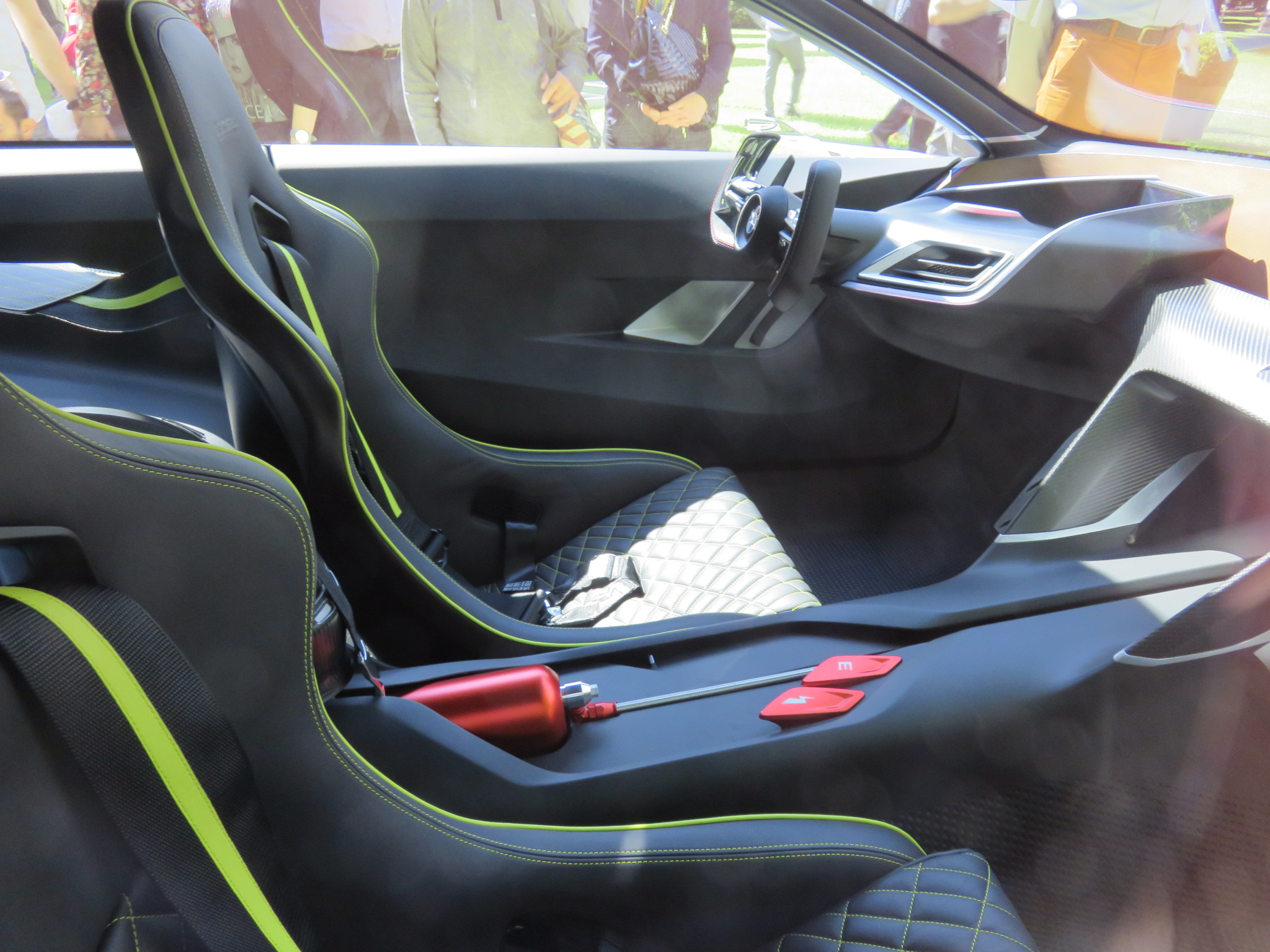

And in August 2015, BMW introduced the BMW 3.0 CSL Hommage R concept car at the Pebble Beach Concours d'Elegance. The car celebrates both the 40th anniversary of BMW in North America and the racing success of the 3.0 CSL in 1975.

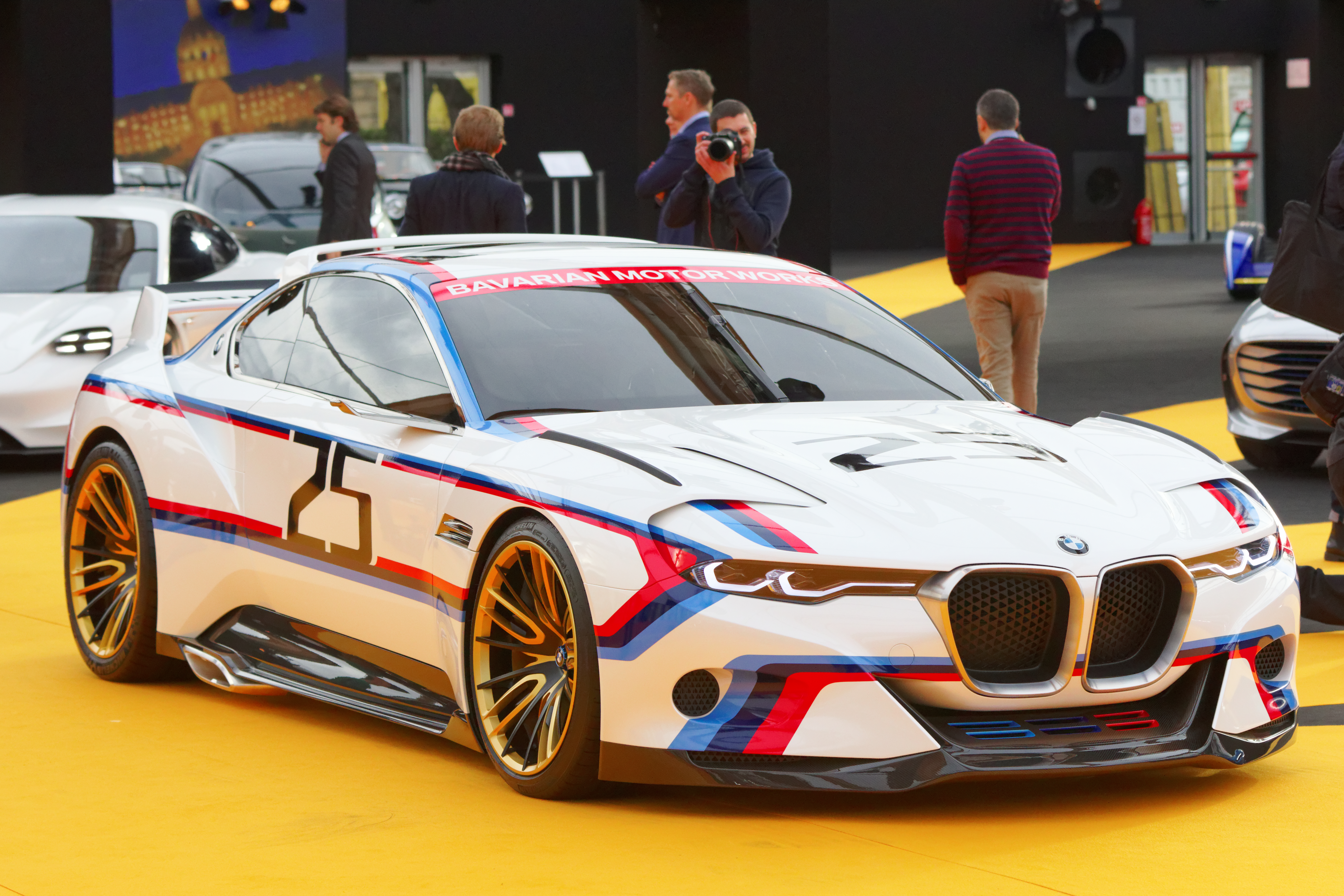

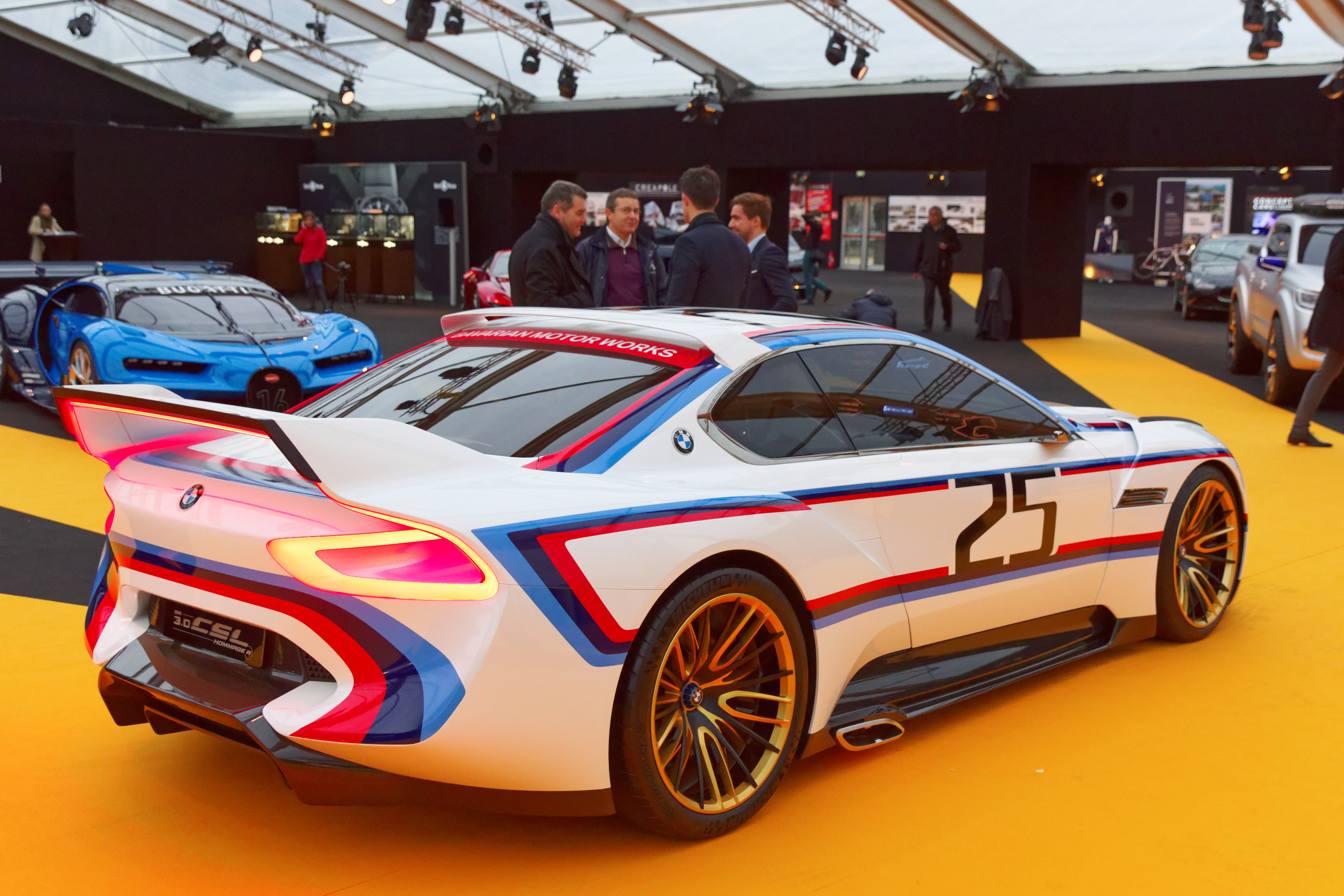

== 2023 3.0 CSL ==
On 24 November 2022, BMW revealed an all-new 3.0 CSL based on the BMW M4, paying homage to the original E9 3.0 CSL. It features a more powerful 3.0-liter Inline-six cylinder engine producing 412 kW (560 PS; 553 hp) and 550 N⋅m (406 lb⋅ft) of torque and was built to celebrate BMW M's 50th Anniversary. 50 units were produced.

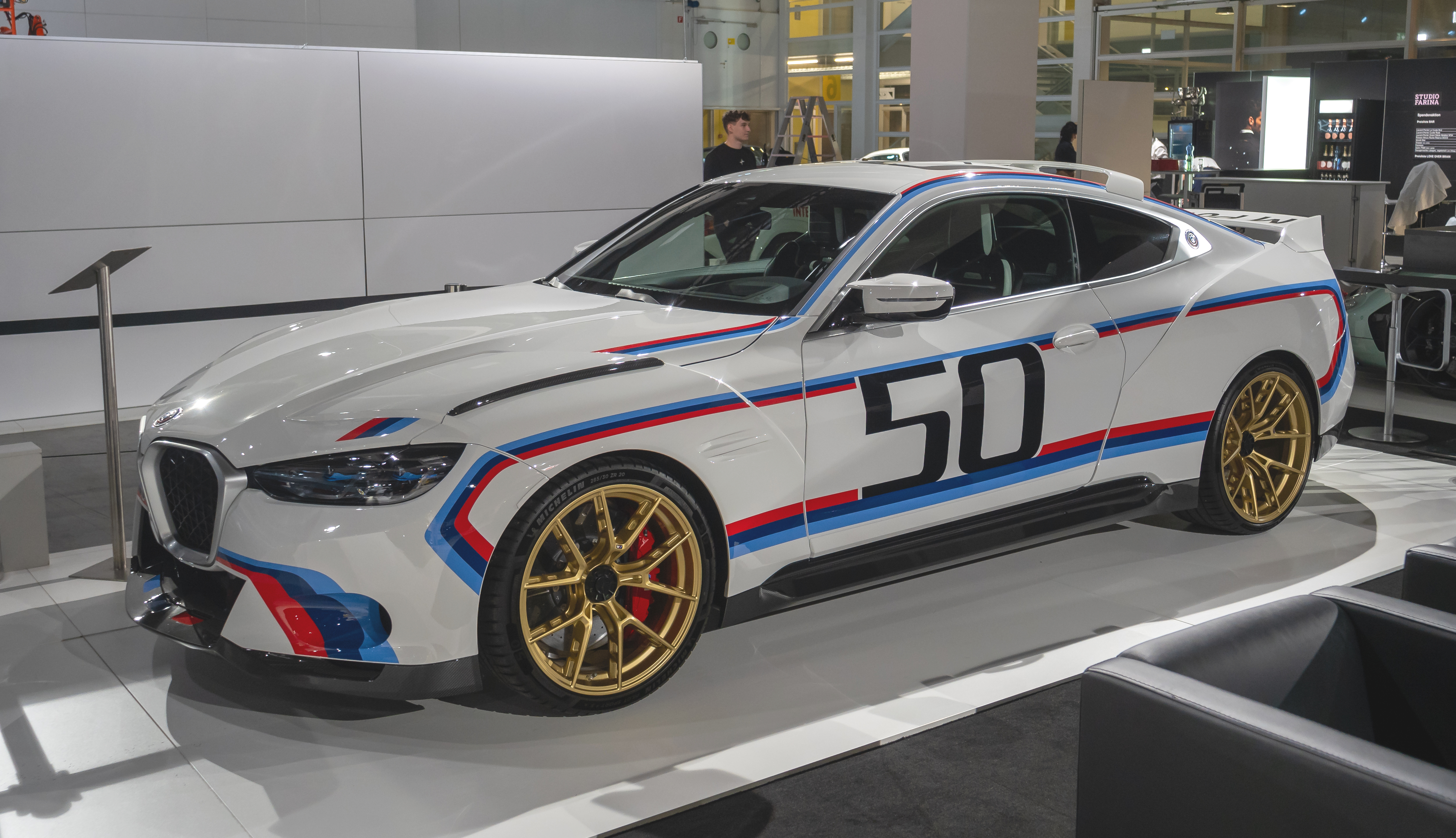
2023 BMW 3.0 CSL

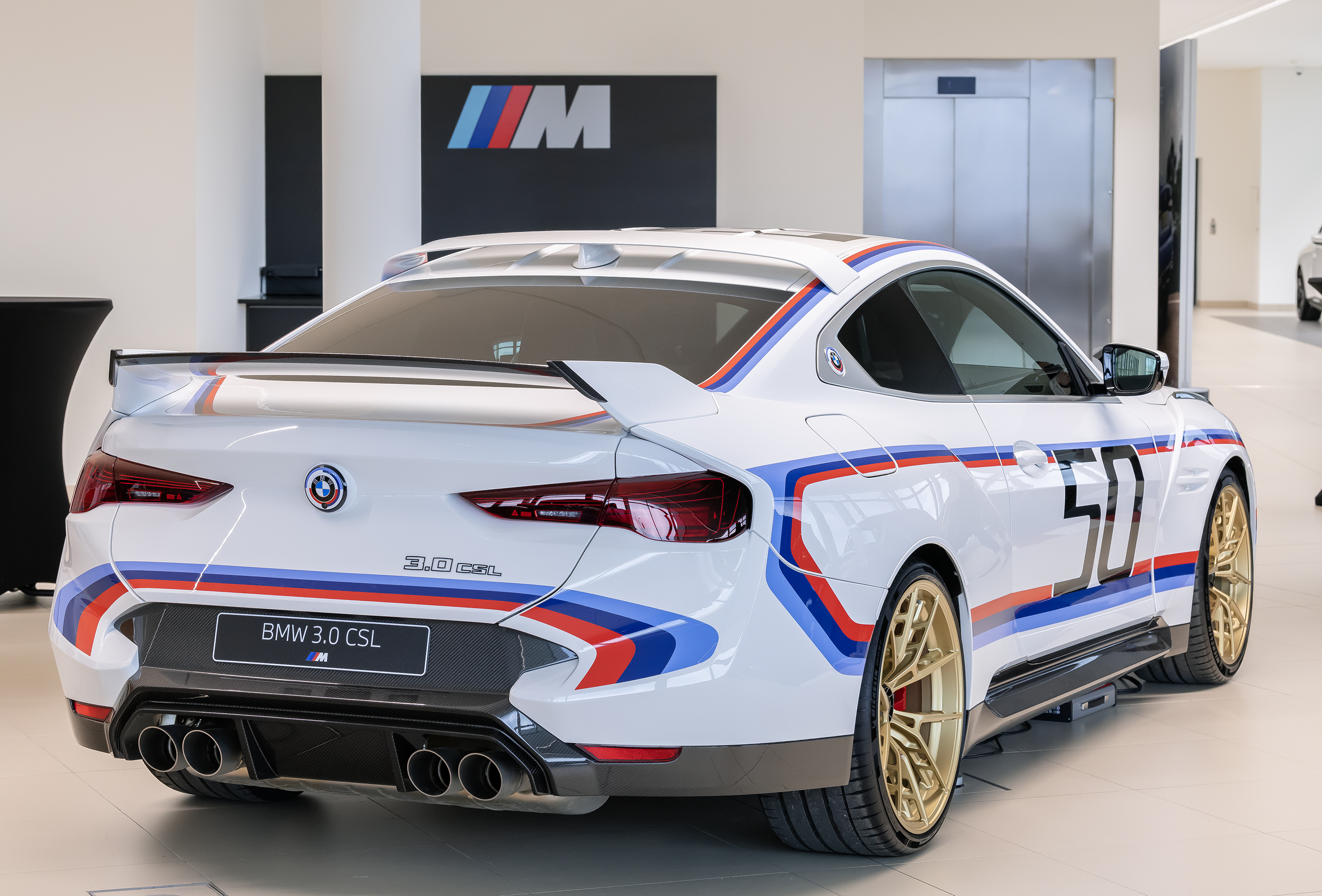
2023 3.0 CSL, rear
