= Porsche in motorsport =

Motorsport activities of Porsche

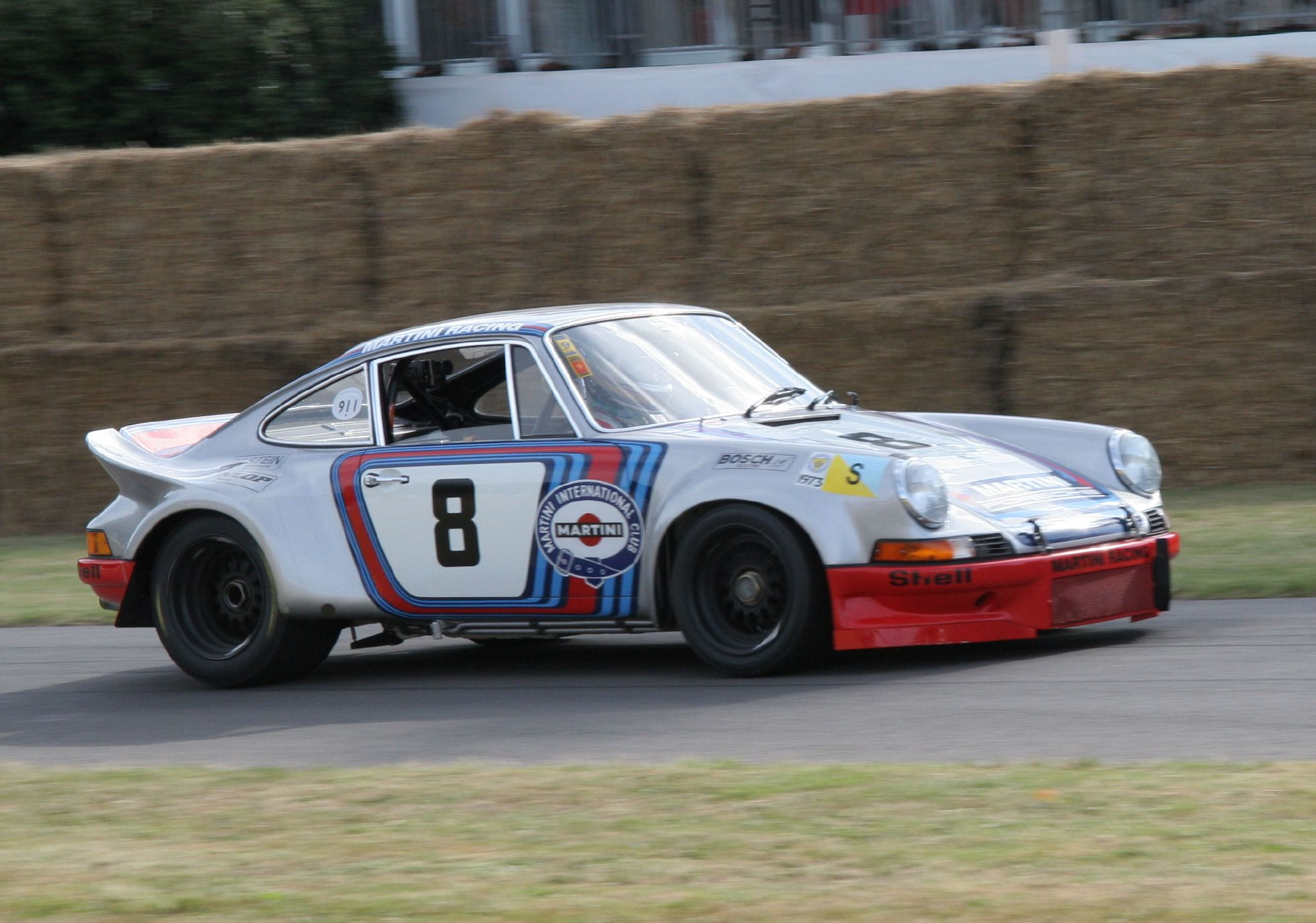
Targa Florio winning 1973 Porsche 911 Carrera RSR in Martini Racing colours at the 2006 Goodwood Festival of Speed.

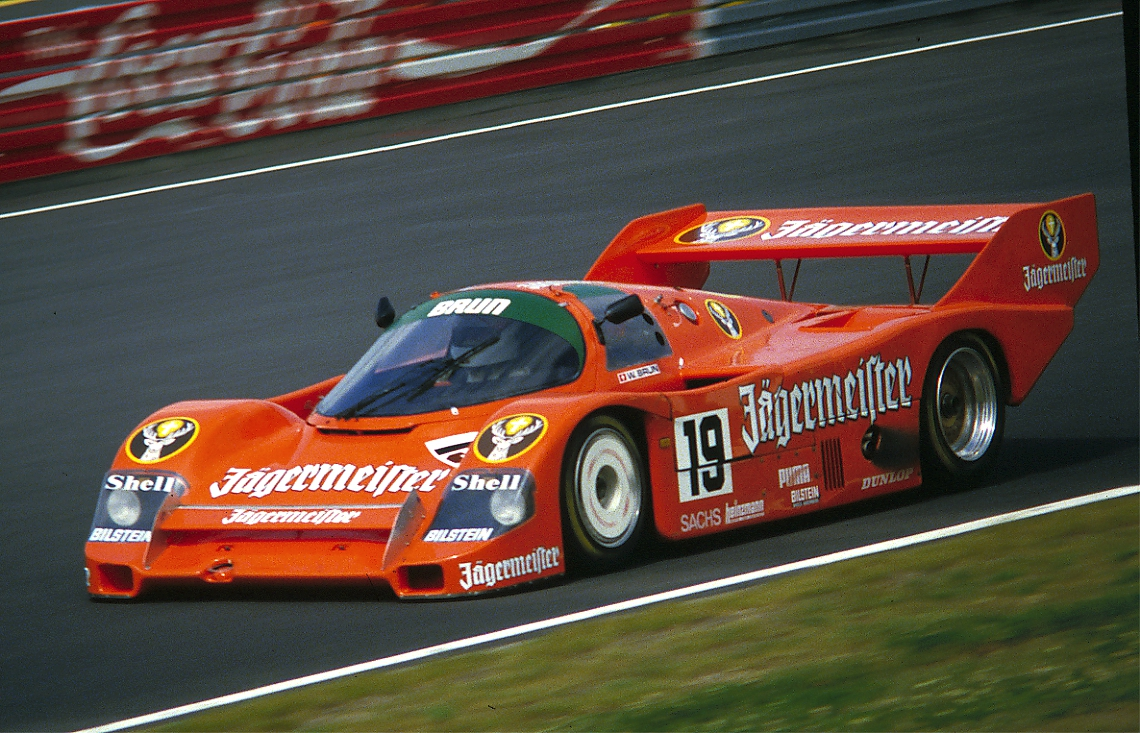
Porsche 956 and 962C, like this in Jägermeister livery, won the 24 Hours of Le Mans six years in a row in the 1980s.

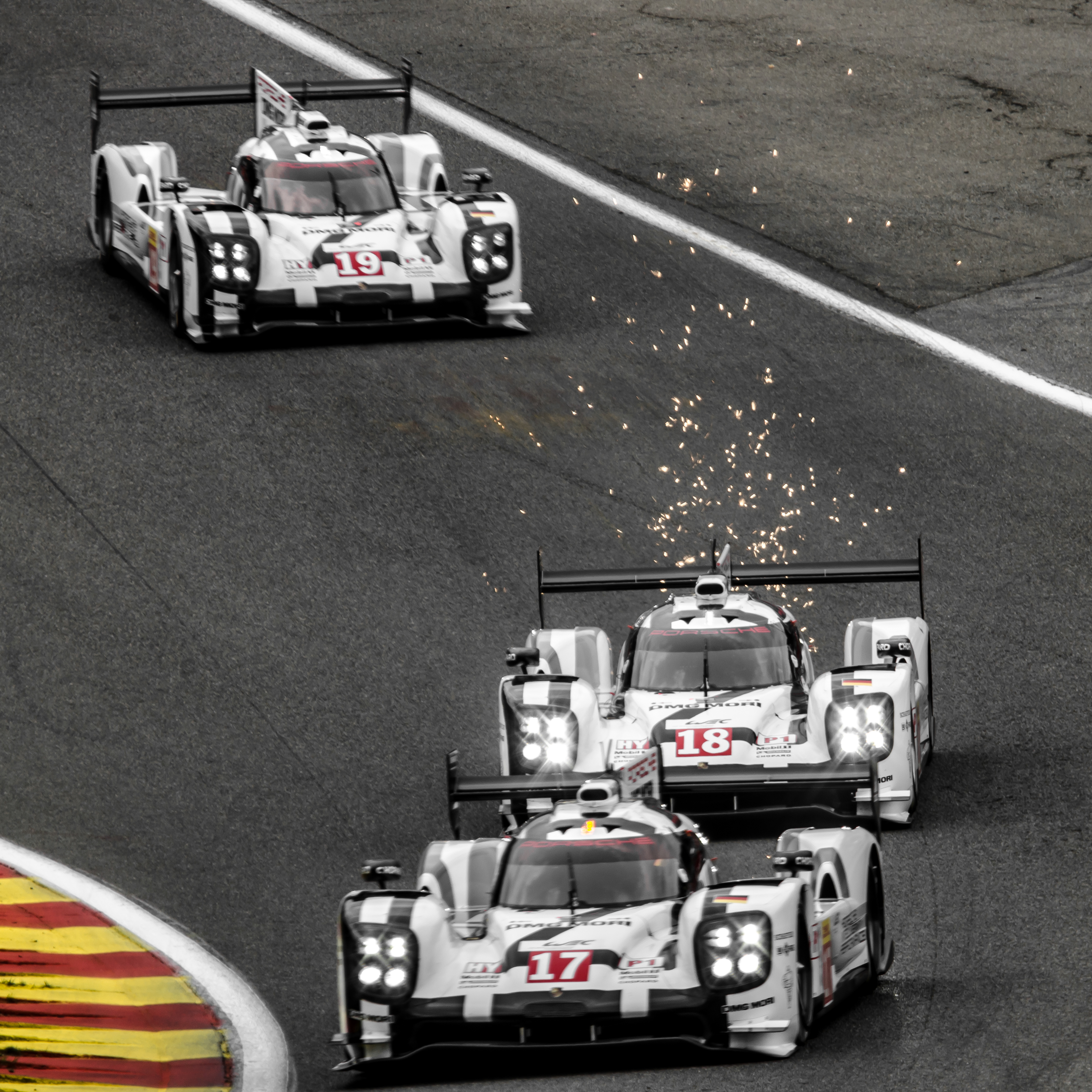
The 3 2015 Porsche 919 Hybrid LMP1 cars from Porsche LMP Team entering Raidillon at the 2015 WEC 6 Heures de Spa-Francorchamps.

Porsche has been successful in many branches of motorsport of which most have been in long-distance races.

Despite their early involvement in motorsports being limited to supplying relatively small engines to racing underdogs up until the late 1960s, by the mid-1950s Porsche had already tasted moderate success in the realm of sports car racing, most notably in the Carrera Panamericana and Targa Florio, classic races which were later used in the naming of street cars. The Porsche 917 of 1969 turned them into a powerhouse, winning in 1970 the first of over a dozen 24 Hours of Le Mans, more than any other company. With the 911 Carrera RSR and the Porsche 935 Turbo, Porsche dominated the 1970s and even has beaten sports prototypes, a category in which Porsche entered the successful 936, 956, and 962 models.

Porsche is currently the world's largest race car manufacturer. In 2006, Porsche built 195 race cars for various international motor sports events, and in 2007 Porsche is expected to construct no fewer than 275 dedicated race cars (7 RS Spyder LMP2 prototypes, 37 GT2 spec 911 GT3-RSRs, and 231 911 GT3 Cup vehicles).

Porsche regards racing as an essential part of ongoing engineering development—it was traditionally very rare for factory-entered Porsche racing cars to appear at consecutive races in the same specification. Some aspect of the car almost invariably was being developed, whether for the future race programs or as proof of concept for future road cars.

== Teams and sponsorship ==
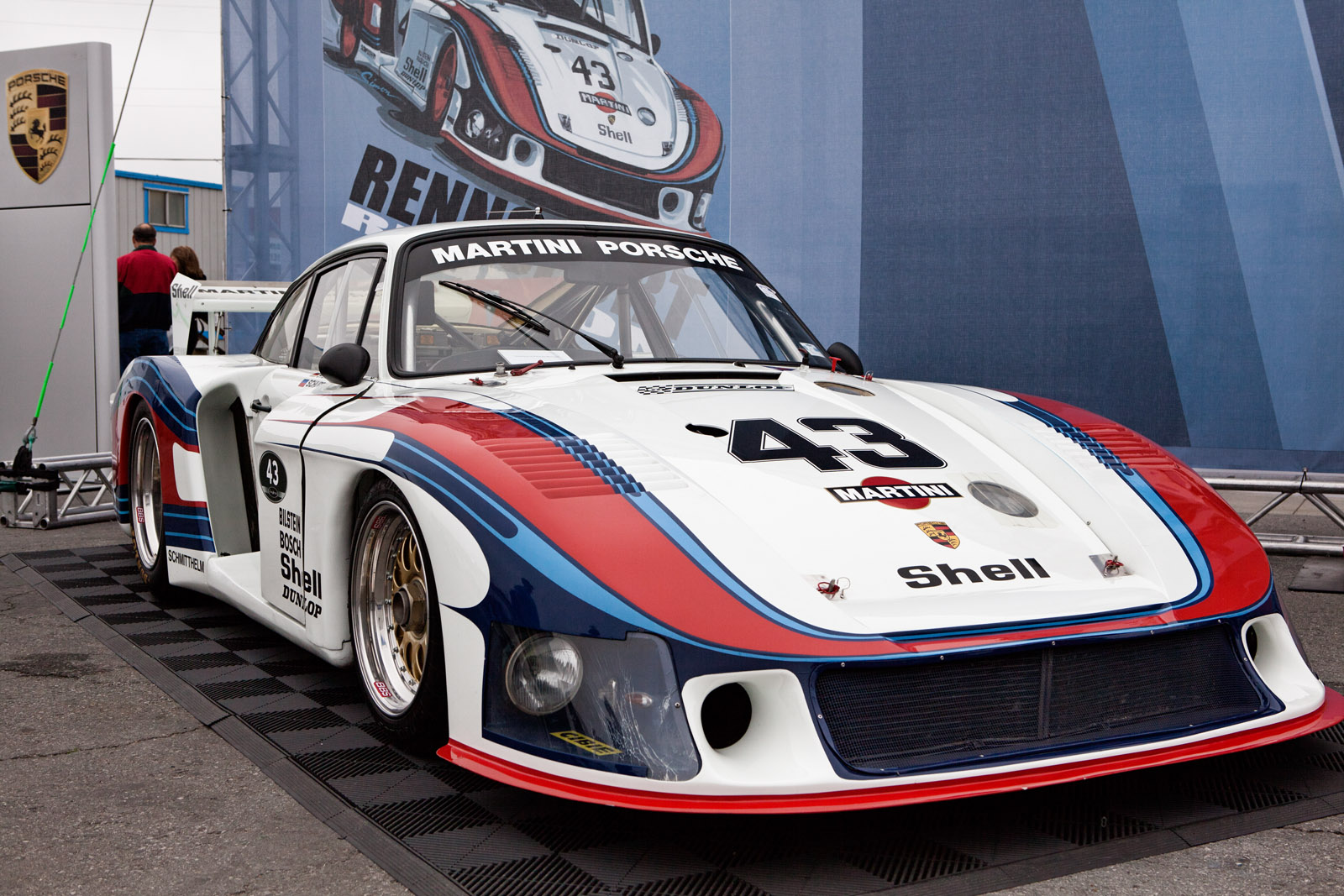
The original Porsche 935/78 "Moby Dick" in Martini Racing livery at the Porsche Rennsport Reunion IV.

In the 1960s, Porsche grew into a major competitor in sports car racing, sometimes entering half a dozen cars which were soon sold to customers. Apart from the factory team, calling itself Porsche AG or Porsche System Engineering since 1961, Austrian-based Porsche Salzburg was set up in 1969 as a second works team to share the workload, providing the much sought first overall win at Le Mans, in 1970. Martini Racing and John Wyer's Gulf Racing were other teams receiving factory support, allowing Zuffenhausen to focus on development, while the teams provided the sponsorship funds and manpower to be present and successful at many international races. In CanAm, Porsche cooperated with Penske, while in Deutsche Rennsportmeisterschaft, customers like Kremer Racing, Georg Loos and Joest Racing enjoyed various degrees of factory support. After appearing as Martini Porsche in the mid-1970s, the factory entered as Rothmans Porsche in the mid-1980s.

Many Porsche race cars are run successfully by customer teams, financed, and run without any factory support; often they have beaten the factory itself.

Recently, 996-generation 911 GT3s have dominated their class at Le Mans and similar endurance and GT races. The late 1990s saw the rise of racing success for Porsche with The Racer's Group, a team owned by Kevin Buckler in Northern California. In 2002, Buckler won the 24 Hours of Daytona GT Class and the 24 Hours of Le Mans GT Class. In 2003, a 911 run by The Racers Group (TRG) became the first GT Class vehicle since 1977 to take the overall 24 Hours of Daytona victory. At the 24h Nürburgring, factory-backed Manthey Racing GT3 won since 2006. The team of Olaf Manthey, based at the Nürburgring, had entered the semi-works GT3-R in 1999.

== Early years ==
As Porsche only had small capacity road and racing cars in the 1950s and 1960s, they scored many wins in their classes, and occasionally also overall victories against bigger cars, most notably winning the Targa Florio in 1956, 1959, 1960, 1964, and every year from 1966 to 1970 in prototypes that lacked horsepower relative to the competition, but which made up for that, with reliability, low drag, low weight and good handling.

In their September 2003 publication, Excellence magazine identified Lake Underwood as Porsche's quiet giant in the United States and he is among the four drivers, including Art Bunker, Bob Holbert, and Charlie Wallace who are identified by the Porsche Club of America as having made Porsche a giant-killer in the US during the 1950s and early 1960s. Notable early successes in the US also included an overall win in the 1963 Road America 500 in an Elva Mark 7 Porsche powered sports racer driven by Bill Wuesthoff and Augie Pabst.

Porsche started racing with lightweight, tuned derivatives of the 356 road car, but rapidly moved on to campaigning dedicated racing cars, with the 550, 718, RS, and RSK models being the backbone of the company's racing programme through to the mid-1960s. The 90x series of cars in the 60s saw Porsche start to expand from class winners that stood a chance of overall wins in tougher races where endurance and handling mattered, to likely overall victors. Engines did not surpass the two litres mark until the rule-makers limited the capacity of the prototype class to 3 litres after 1967, as the four-litre Ferrari P series and the seven-litre Ford GT40 became too fast. Porsche first expanded its 8-cyl flat engine to 2.2 litres in the 907, then developed the 908 with full three litres in 1968. Based on this 8-cyl flat engine and a loophole in the rules, the 4.5-litre flat 12 917 was introduced in 1969, eventually expanded to five litres, and later even to 5.4 and turbocharged. Within a few years, Porsche with the 917 had grown from underdog to the supplier of the fastest (380 km/h at Le Mans) and most powerful (1580 hp in CanAm) race car in the world.

== Five decades of Porsche 911 success ==
Even though introduced in 1963, and winning the Rally Monte Carlo, the Porsche 911 classic (built until 1989) established its reputation in production-based road racing mainly in the 1970s.

- Porsche 911 Carrera RSR, winner of the Targa Florio, Daytona and Sebring in the mid-1970s
- Porsche 934
- Porsche 935, winner in Le Mans 1979

Due to regulation restraints, the 911 was not used very much in the 1980s but returned in the 1990s as the Porsche 993, like the GT2 turbo model. The water-cooled Porsche 996 series became a success in racing after the GT3 variant was introduced in 1999.

== Porsche in major motorsports ==
=== Endurance ===
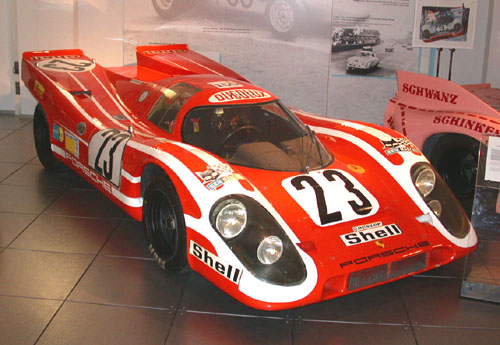
The 917 gave Porsche its first 24 Hours of Le Mans win in 1970.

The Porsche 917 is considered one of the most iconic racing cars of all time and gave Porsche their first 24 Hours of Le Mans wins, while open-top variants of it won in Can-Am racing. Porsche moved on to dominate the IMSA GTP in the 1980s with the Porsche 956/962C, one of the most prolific and successful sports prototype racers ever produced.

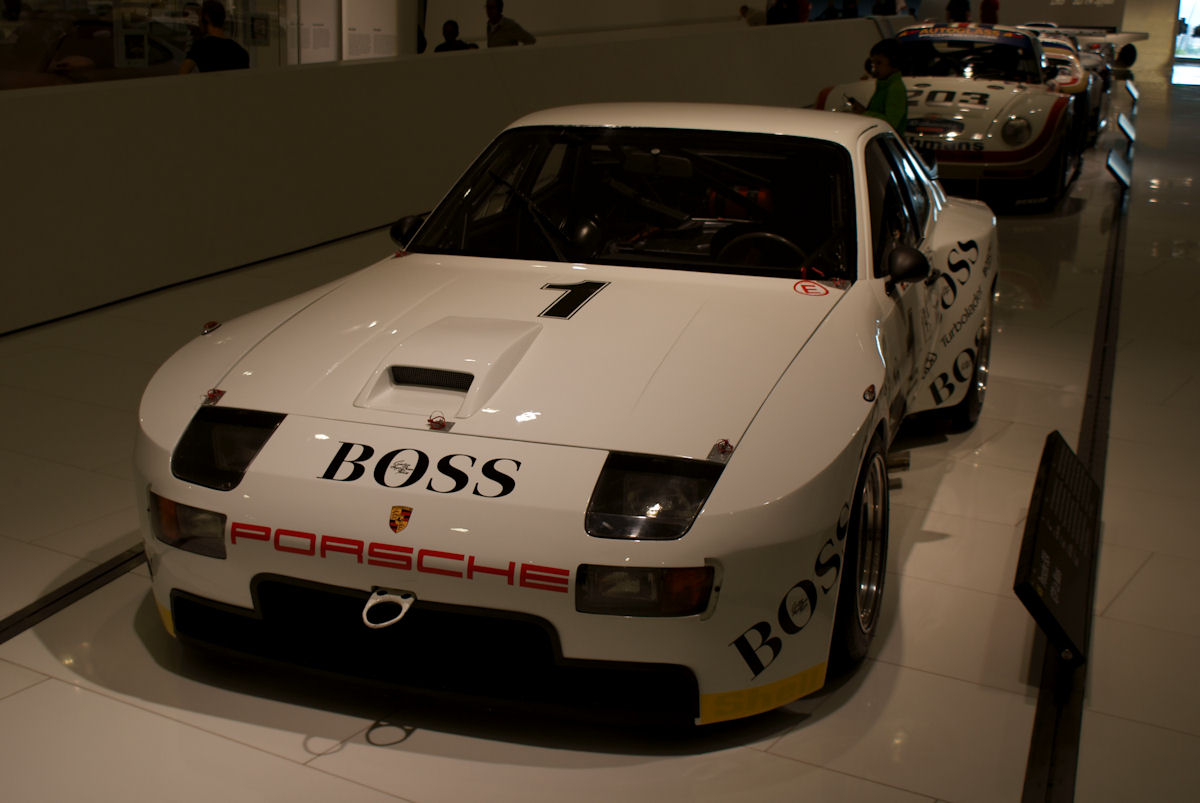
The 924 GTP, also called 944 LM. While not designed for outright wins, the car still brought home victories in their individual classes at Le Mans.

Although the car was never intended to win outright at Le Mans the Porsche 924/944 platforms were still able to secure class wins throughout their relatively short time tenure at Le Mans. The year 1980 saw the ultimate iteration of the 924 battle it out against opponents with larger engine displacements, ultimately it was able to secure a 6th place overall finish with a 2nd in its under 3-litre GTP class. The following year, 1981 saw once again multiple entries of the 924, with one car utilising a prototype version of the upcoming 944's 2.5-litre engine. This 924 GTP (sometimes called 944 LM) was piloted by Jürgen Barth and Walter Röhrl to a class win for the new GTP+3.0 class and 7th overall, 31 laps behind the overall Porsche 936/81 winner. Its stablemate, a 924 Carrera GTR piloted by Andy Rouse and Manfred Schurti, was then driven to another class victory for the IMSA GTO class and an 11th overall position.

While there was no longer a factory team running the 924 GTR in 1982, the car would still be fielded to another class win in the IMSA GTO class by BF Goodrich Brornos team with drivers Doc Bundy and Marcel Mignot.

Porsche scored a couple of unexpected Le Mans wins in 1996 and 1997. A return to prototype racing in the US was planned for 1995 with a Tom Walkinshaw Racing chassis formerly used as the Jaguar XJR-14 and the Mazda MXR-01 fitted with a Porsche engine. IMSA rule changes struck this car out of the running and the private Joest Racing team raced the cars in Europe for two years, winning back-to-back Le Mans with the same chassis, termed the Porsche WSC-95. This is a feat Joest had also achieved in the 1980s with 956 chassis 117, contrasting with the works habit of the 1960s and later where most factory race cars ran only one or two races for the works team before being sold on to finance newer cars.

Between 1998 (when Porsche won overall with the Porsche 911 GT1-98) and 2014, Porsche did not attempt to score overall wins at Le Mans and similar sports car races, focusing on smaller classes and developing the water-cooled 996 GT3. Nevertheless, the GT3 and the LMP2 RS Spyder won major races overall during the period. Hybrid technology was tested in endirance races with the Porsche 911 GT3 R Hybrid in 2010 and 2011.

When Le Mans adopted Hybrid rules as a new challenge and stopped giving advantage to Diesel, Porsche returned to top-tier Le Mans racing in 2014 with the Porsche 919 Hybrid, but both cars experienced unknown engine issues with an hour and a half left to go and retired just as the #20 car was chasing down the #1 Audi in first place.

In 2015, a Porsche 919 Hybrid hybrid car driven by Nick Tandy, Earl Bamber and Nico Hülkenberg won the 83rd running of the 24 Hours of Le Mans. The Porsche LMP1 program went on to win the overall victory in the 2015 FIA World Endurance Championship. The 919 program has also gone on to win the 84th running of Le Mans (2016) in a 919 driven by Neel Jani, Romain Dumas, and Marc Lieb, taking the lead with just over 3 minutes left. Porsche completed a hat trick by winning the 2017 24 Hours of Le Mans with drivers Timo Bernhard, Earl Bamber, and Brendon Hartley. After the 919 had scored the 19th overall Porsche win, it was retired.

About half a year after Audi left, in mid-2017, Porsche announced that they would close their LMP1 program at the end of the year. At the time, the Porsche museum guides put emphasis on the all-electric and hybrid cars developed by Ferdinand Porsche in the early 1900s, and Porsche focussed on the Porsche Mission E and Formula E racing.

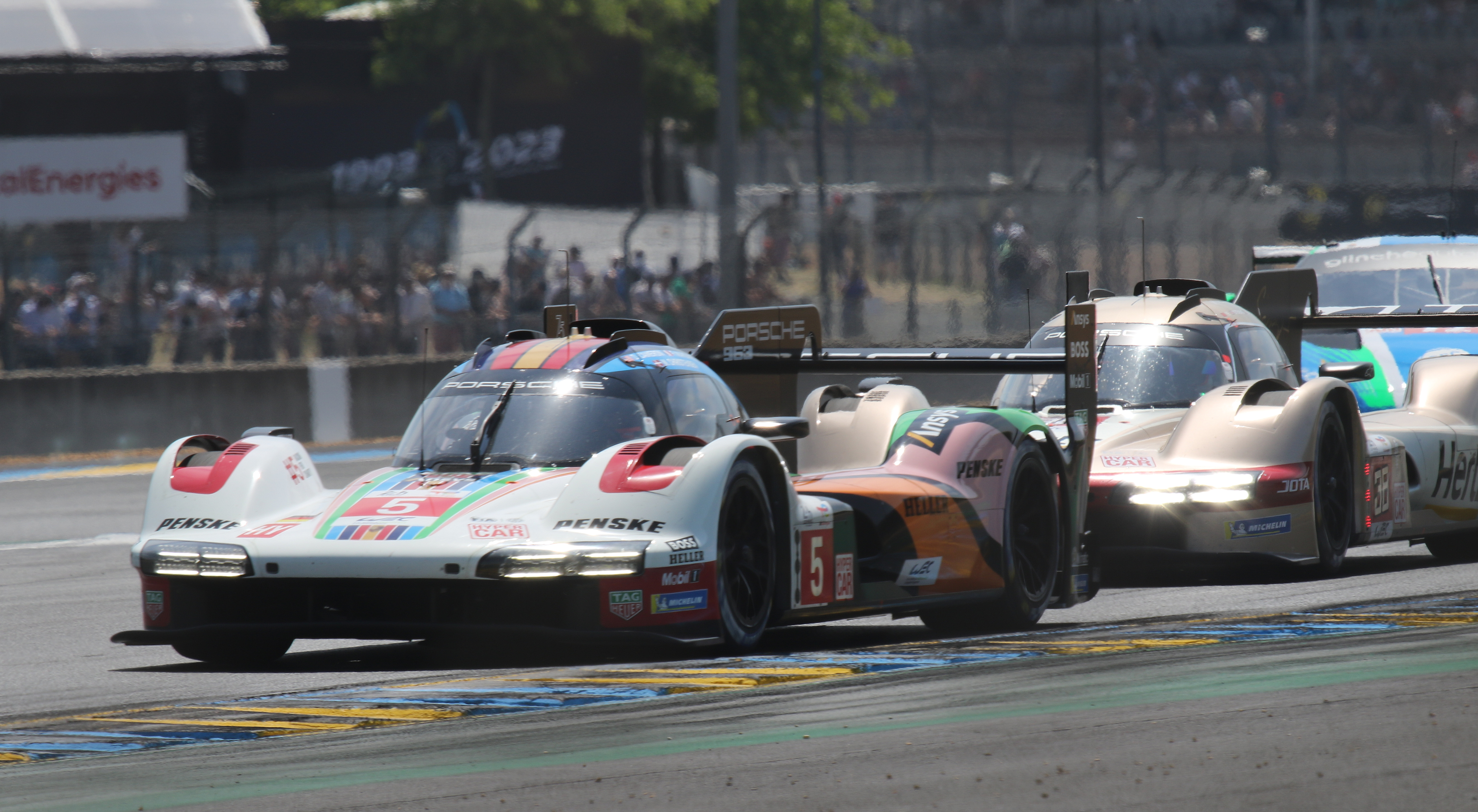
The No. 5 Penske-entered Porsche 963 competing at the 2023 24 Hours of Le Mans

In May 2021 Porsche announced its return to FIA World Endurance Championship new category LMDh with Penske running their factory team. They announced their return to both WEC and IMSA for 2023 season running two new Porsche 963 in each competition. To prepare their return to WEC, Penske took part in WEC 2022 season with one Oreca 07-Gibson in LMP2 class. Former Team Penske lubricant partner and supplier Mobil 1 rejoined as official team's lubricant partner and supplier from 2023 season onwards due to the Porsche partnership. The 963 made its FIA World Endurance Championship debut at the 2023 1000 Miles of Sebring, where it finished 5th and 6th. Porsche would end the 2023 season 3rd in the Hypercar World Endurance Manufacturers' Championship behind the Toyota GR010 Hybrid and Ferrari 499P, and 1-2 in the FIA World Cup for Hypercar Teams with Hertz Team Jota and Proton Competition as Porsche is the only team to supply customer teams

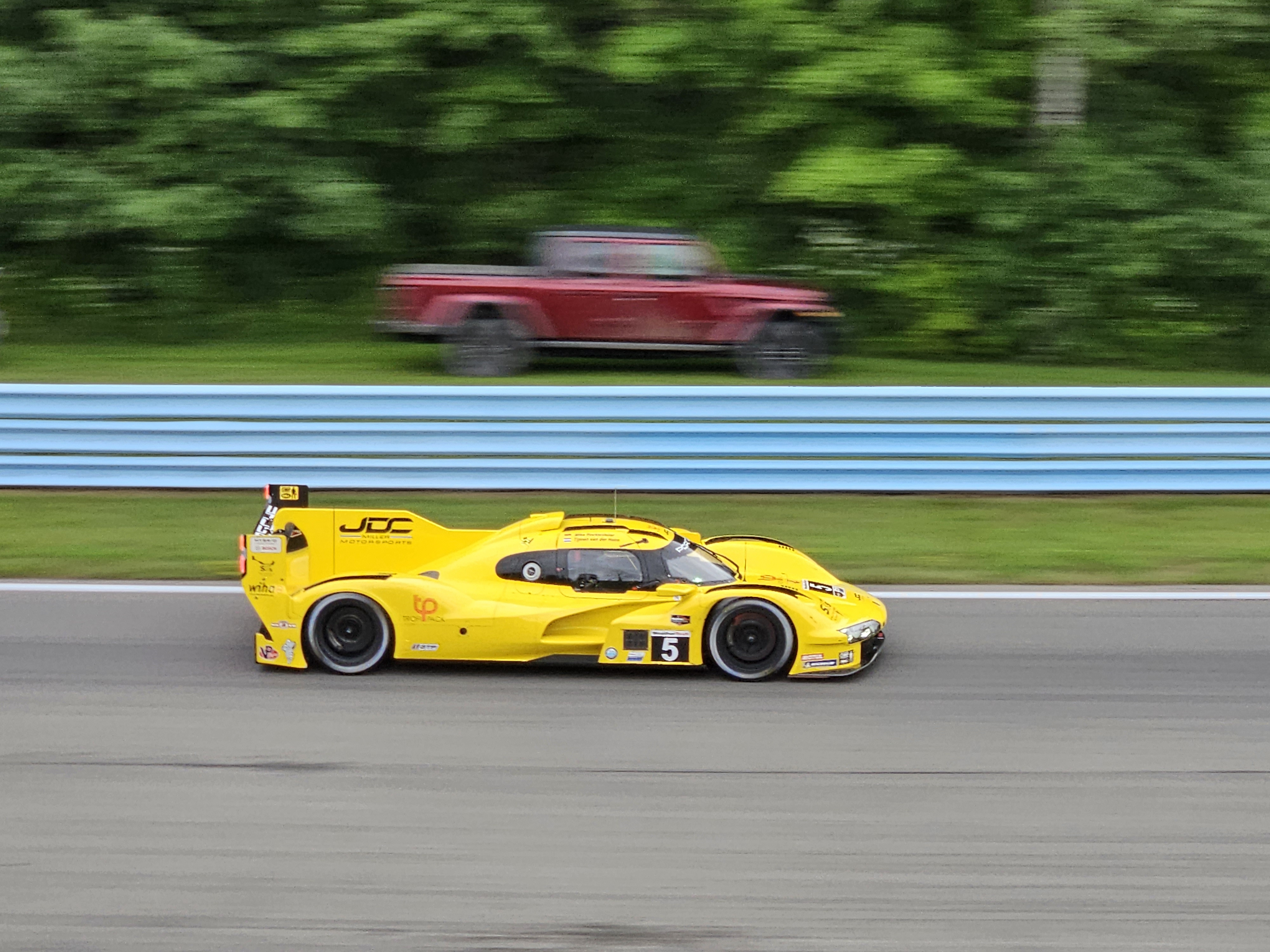
The Porsche 963 of JDC-Miller MotorSports, driven by Tijmen van der Helm and Mike Rockenfeller at the 2023 Sahlen's Six Hours of The Glen sanctioned by the International Motor Sports Association (IMSA) where it completed 199 laps (2 laps behind the winning BMW M Hybrid V8 of BMW M Team RLL) and finished 4th overall

Due to supply-chain constraints, Porsche Penske Motorsport, the factory team, was the only team that could field the 963 at its debut at the 2023 24 Hours of Daytona. The 963 made its first appearance alongside the other new GTP cars., the BMW M Hybrid V8, the Acura ARX-06, and the Cadillac V-LMDh. The 963 was often right behind the ARX-06s of Meyer Shank Racing and Wayne Taylor Racing, with the former leading all five practice sessions, bar the last one. During the race, both Porsches were beset by reliability issues, with significant time spent in the garages: No. 7 was the first to come in, losing 35 laps to replace a faulty battery, and Tandy – in No. 6 – had been running in contention for overall victory in the morning until a gearbox failure ended his race. The Porsche 963 took its first victory in IMSA competition on the Streets of Long Beach with Mathieu Jaminet and Nick Tandy driving. In the season's fourth round, the Motul Course de Monterey, Matt Campbell took the car's first pole position while Tandy's No. 6 started second and van der Helm's No. 5 JDC–Miller Motorsports car qualified ninth. The No. 6 car recovered to second after a slow start. Campbell hit the No. 94 Andretti Autosport Aston Martin Vantage AMR GT3, losing time as he served a drive-through penalty. A crash at turn 10 after Nasr relieved Campbell relegated the No. 7 car to ninth. Tijmen van der Helm and Mike Rockenfeller finished seventh in JDC–Miller Motorsports first race with the car. At Watkins Glen, Tandy and Jaminet started from pole position after qualifying was cancelled. Porsche Penske Motorsport's No. 6 car battled for the win. Through a better pit-stop strategy, the No. 6 Porsche overtook the No. 31 Cadillac and the No. 60 Acura and rejoined in second with 40 minutes remaining. Jaminet overtook Connor De Phillippi in the final minutes before the race ended behind the safety car. The No. 7 car was in contention until Nasr sustained an issue with the hybrid system and spent 2 hours replacing the battery, gearbox and rear axle. It later emerged onto the track and finished 52nd overall. Later, the No. 6 Porsche was disqualified for illegal skid block wear.

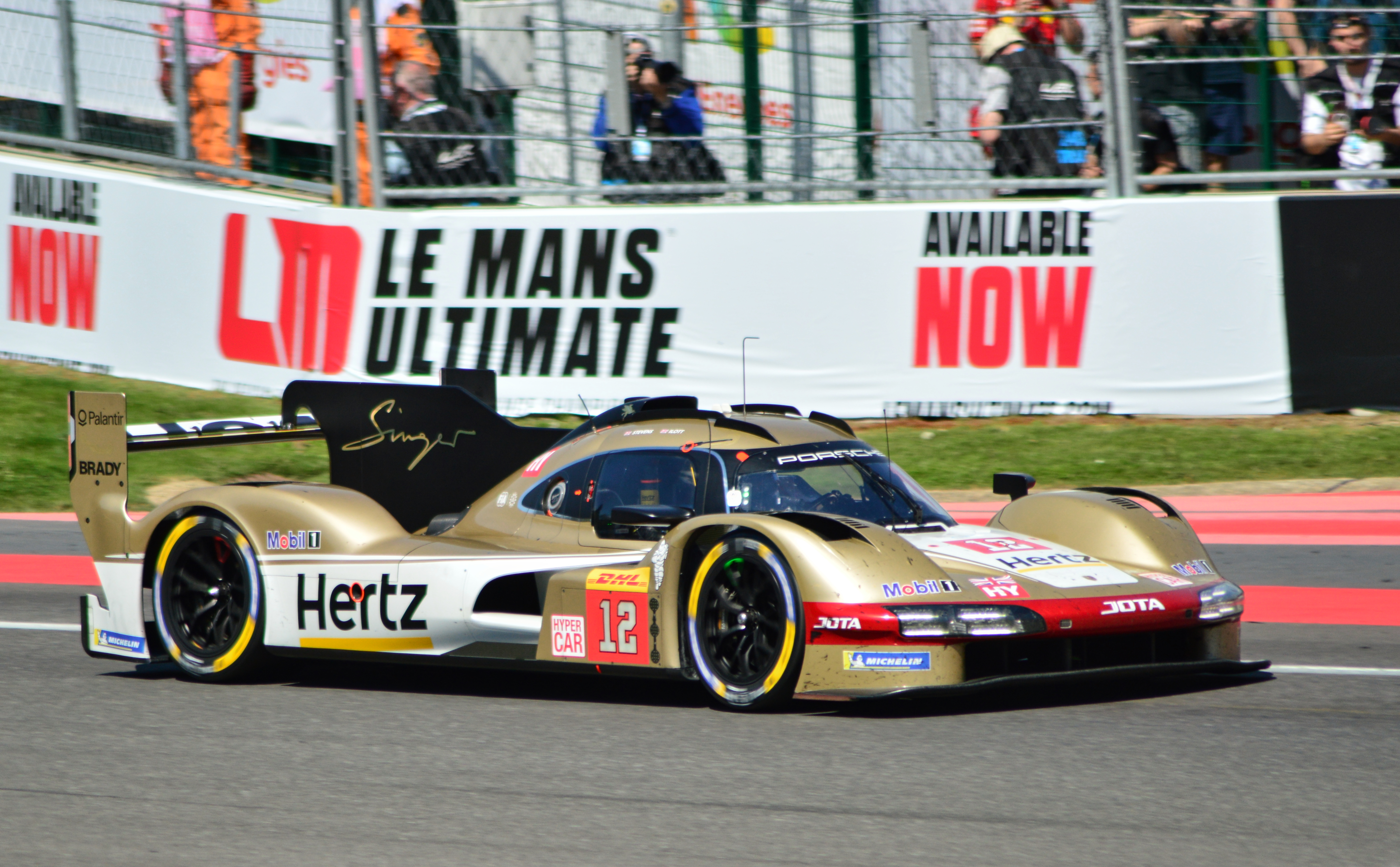
The No. 12 963 ran by Jota won the 2024 FIA World Cup for Hypercar Teams

In 2024, Porsche finished 2024 24 Hours of Le Mans 4th and 6th under the factory team, 8th and 9th under Hertz Team Jota, and 45th and 46th (16th and 17th in the Hypercar Class) under Proton Competition. That same year, they won the IMSA SportsCar Manufacturers' Championship, the IMSA SportsCar Grand Touring Prototype Teams' Championship, the IMSA SportsCar Grand Touring Prototype Drivers' Championship, the FIA World Endurance Hypercar World Endurance Drivers' Championship, the FIA World Endurance Championship World Cup for Hypercar Teams with Hertz Team Jota and finished 2nd in the FIA World Endurance Hypercar World Endurance Manufacturers' Championship behind Toyota's Toyota GR010 Hybrid.

For the 2025 Season, Hertz Team Jota announced they will be switching to running the Cadillac V-Series.R, meaning they will run as a factory entry for the first time and no longer be a Porsche customer team.

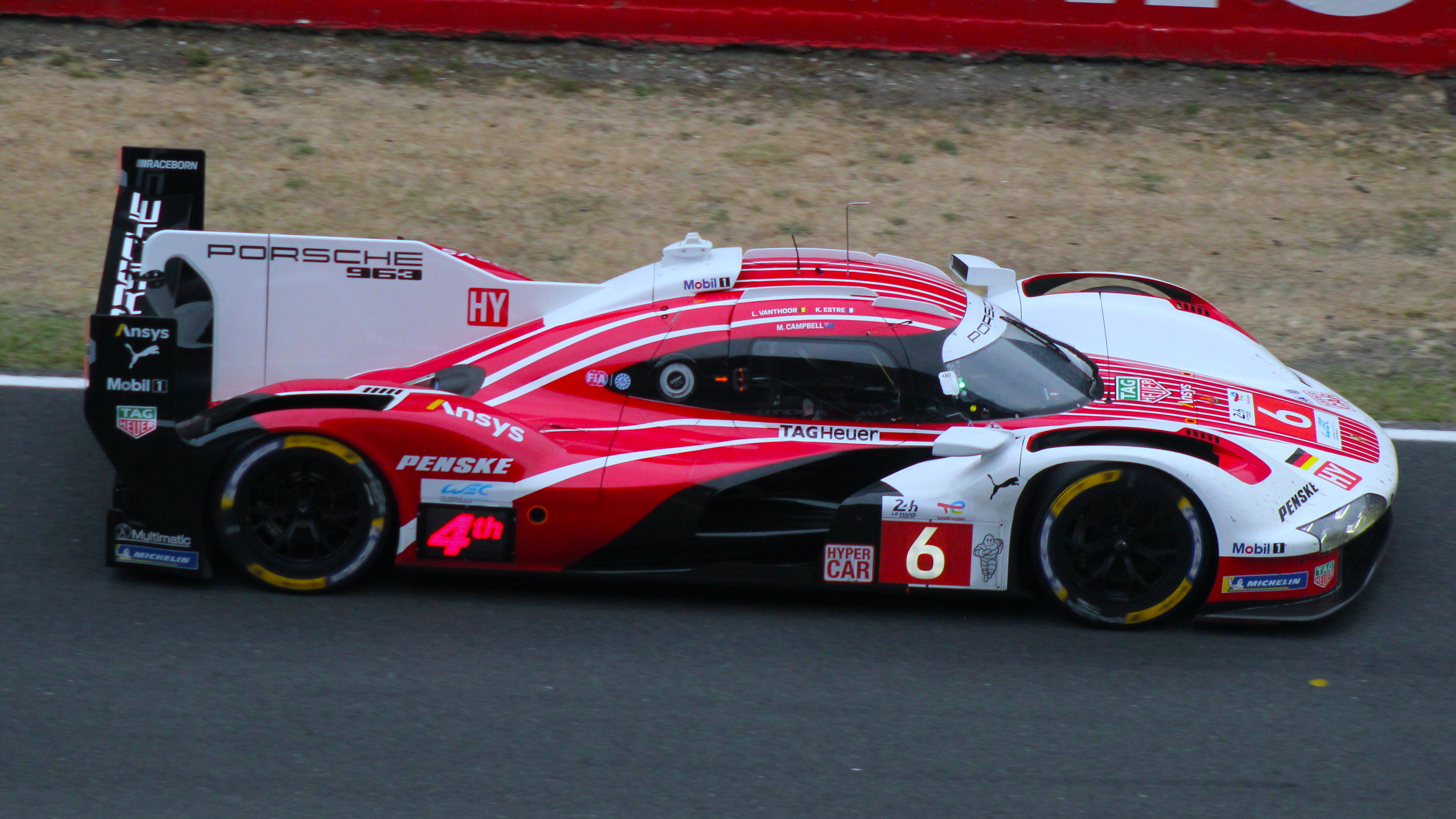
The No. 6 Penske Porsche 963 was disqualified from qualifying due to a violation of minimum weight regulations.

Porsche saw a dominant start to their 2025 IMSA campaign with the 963, winning the first four races of the season at Daytona, Sebring, Long Beach, and Laguna Seca. Their start at WEC was not as fruitful, struggling to keep up with the front runners with a best finish of 8th in its first three races of the season. At the 2025 24 Hours of Le Mans, the 963 saw its best result in the endurance race, the #6 car finishing 2nd overall, 14 seconds behind the race winning #83 Ferrari 499P from AF Corse. The #6 had started the race from the back of the grid in its class, after suffering a disqualification due to a weight infraction. Had it won, it would have been the lowest starting position before a race win in the history of the event.

On 7 October, Porsche announced that they would end their factory programme in the FIA World Endurance Championship after 2026 following financial losses.

=== Rally ===
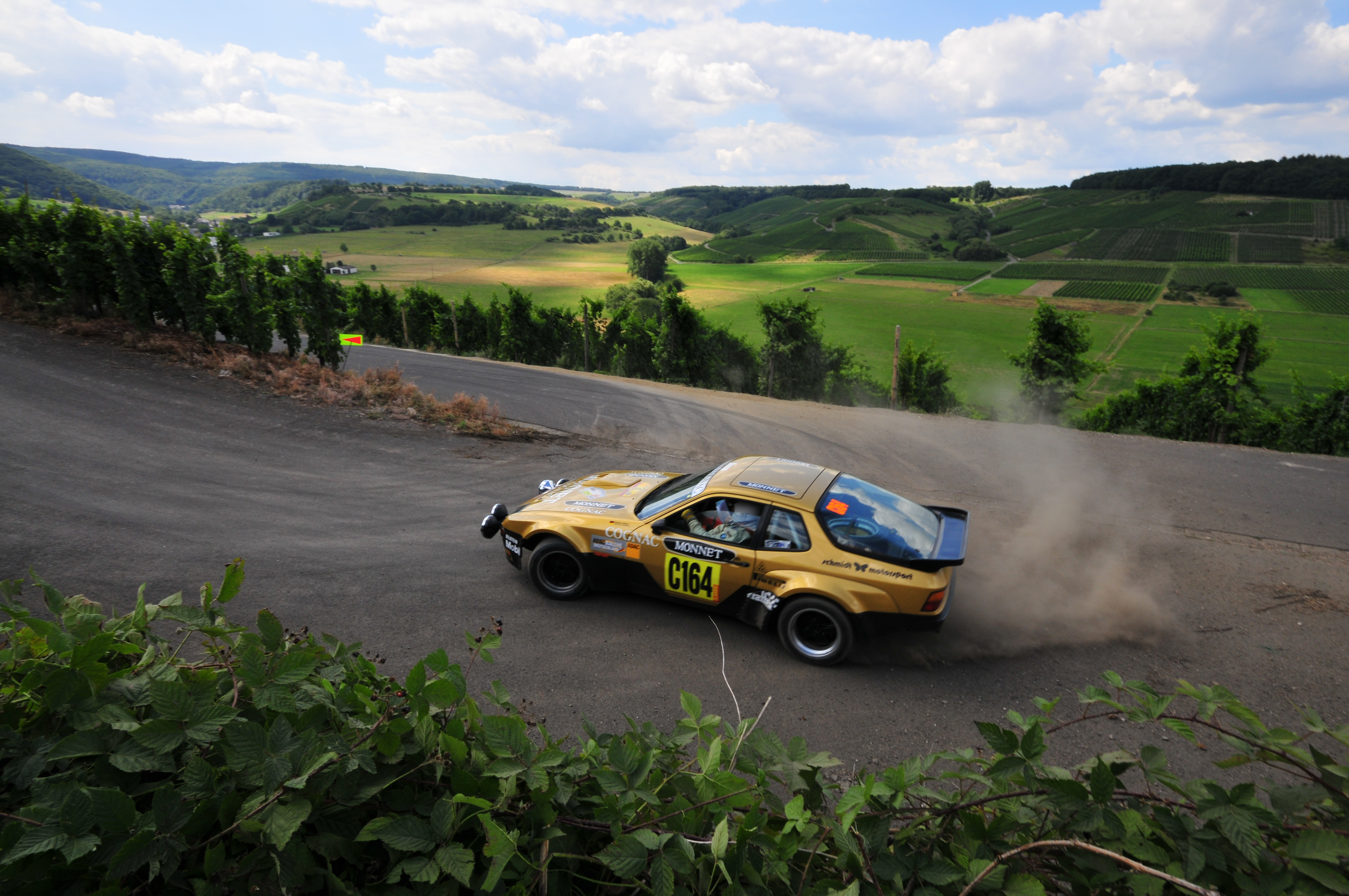
Walter Röhrl's 1981 Porsche 924 GTS driven at the 2008 Rallye Deutschland.

The various versions of the Porsche 911 proved to be a serious competitor in rallies. The Porsche works team was occasionally present in rallying from the 1960s to the late 1970s. In 1967 the Polish driver Sobiesław Zasada drove a 912 to capture the European Rally Championship for Group 1 series touring cars. Porsche took three double wins in a row in the Monte Carlo Rally; in 1968 with Vic Elford and Pauli Toivonen, and in 1969 and 1970 with Björn Waldegård and Gérard Larrousse. In 1970, Porsche also edged Alpine-Renault to win the International Championship for Manufacturers (IMC), the predecessor to the World Rally Championship (WRC). Porsche's first podium finish in the WRC was Leo Kinnunen's third place at the 1973 1000 Lakes Rally.

Although the Porsche factory team withdrew from the WRC with no wins to their name, the best private 911s were often close to other brands' works cars. Jack Tordoff was the first privateer to win an International Rally using a 911 2.7 Carrera RS Sport (Lightweight) on the Circuit of Ireland in 1973 (a round of the European Rally Championship). This success was followed by Cathal Curley who won the 1973 Donegal International Rally in a 911 2.7 RS Touring. Cathal Curley followed this with the greatest run of International Rally wins ever recorded in a Porsche Carrera RS when in 1974 he won the Circuit of Ireland, Donegal and Manx International Rallies in AUI 1500, the last Rhd 911 2.7 Carrera RS Sport produced by Porsche. In 1975 Cathal Curley upgraded to the new 3.0 Carrera RS in 1975 and won the Cork 20 which became an International Rally in 1977. Cathal Curley won four International Rallies in a 2.7 Carrera RS, multiple wins in mechanically standard cars straight off the showroom floor. These wins were all the more impressive as Ireland was the hotbed of International Rallying for the Porsche 911 RS in the 1970s. Jack Tordoff's victory was steady and deserved as he stalked the leading works backed Escort that failed on the penultimate stage beating this car and two other entered 911s but by 1974 Cathal Curley's wins came against no less than fourteen other 911 RSs beating the great Roger Clark in a works backed Escort in the 1974 Manx International Rally too. Over half of the UK allocation of 17 2.7 RS Sport (Lightweights) were rallied at any one time in Ireland in the 1970s.

Jean-Pierre Nicolas managed to win the 1978 Monte Carlo Rally with a private 911 SC, and Porsche's second, and so far last, WRC win came at the 1980 Tour de Corse in the hands of Jean-Luc Thérier. In the European Rally Championship, the 911 was driven to five titles, and as late as 1984, Henri Toivonen took his Prodrive-built and Rothmans-sponsored 911 SC RS to second place behind Carlo Capone and the Lancia Rally 037. In 1984 and 1986, the Porsche factory team won the Paris Dakar Rally, also using the 911 derived Porsche 959 Group B supercar.

Porsche won the Spanish Rally Championship five times between 2009 and 2015 with Sergio Vallejo and Miguel Ángel Fuster with a Porsche 911 GT3. The manufacturer also won the 2015 and 2017 FIA R-GT Cup with François Delecour and Romain Dumas respectively, also with a 911 GT3.

=== Formula One ===
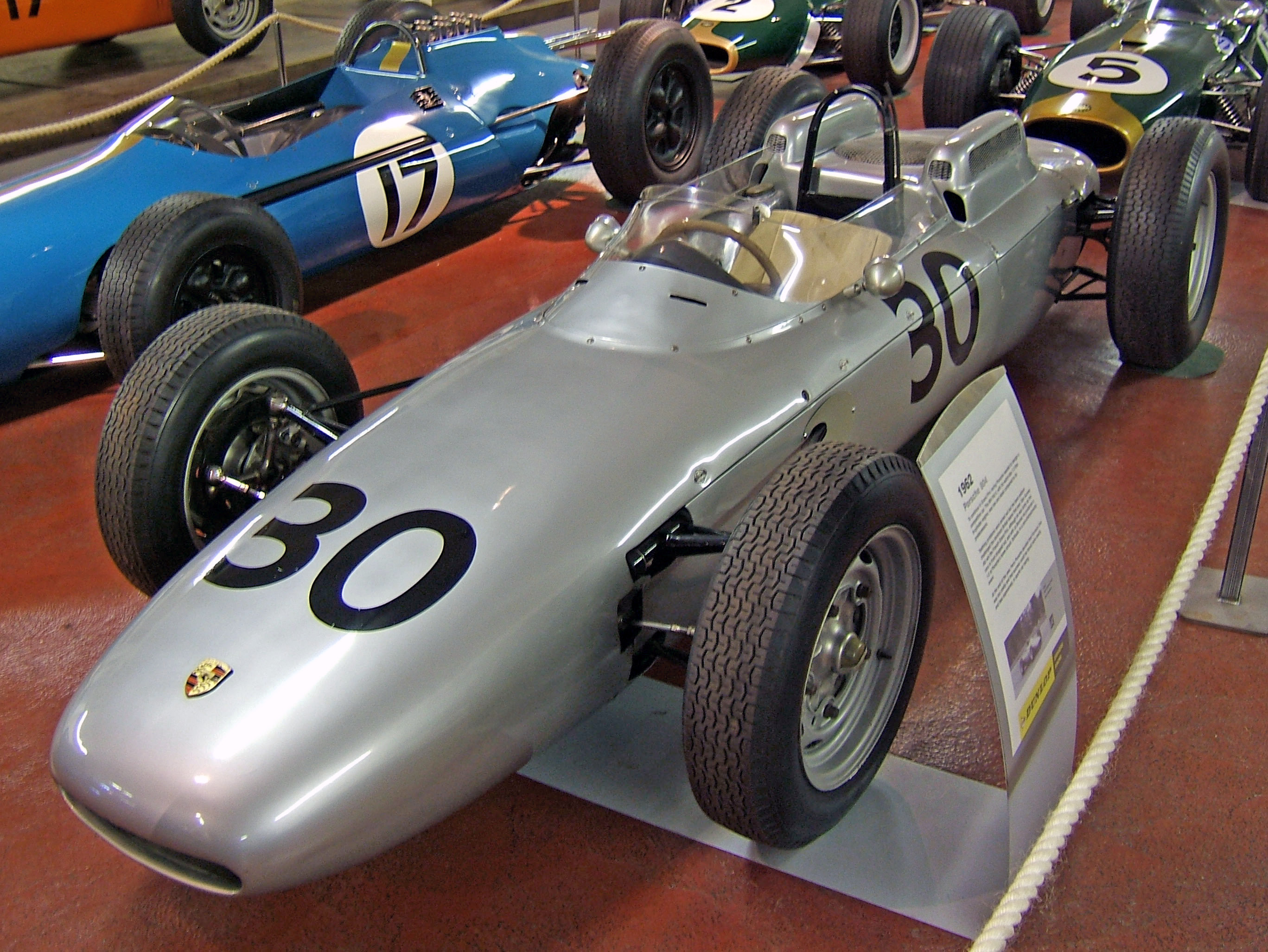
1962 Porsche 804

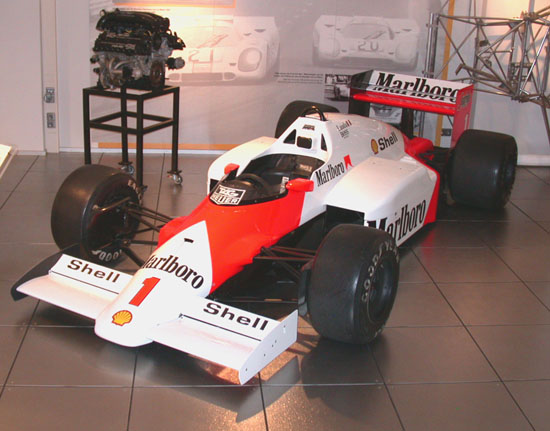
McLaren MP4/2 Formula One car, powered by a TAG-Porsche engine

==== Early years ====
Despite Ferdinand Porsche having designed Grand Prix cars in the 1920s and 1930s for Mercedes and Auto Union, the Porsche AG never felt at home in single-seater series.

In the late 1950s the Porsche 718 RSK, a two-seater sports car, was entered in Formula Two races, as rules permitted this, and lap times were promising. The 718 was first modified by moving the seat into the center of the car, and subsequently proper open wheelers were built. These 1500 cc cars enjoyed some success. The former F2 cars were moved up to Formula One in 1961, where Porsche's outdated design was not competitive. For 1962, a newly developed flat-eight powered and sleek Porsche 804 produced Porsche's only win as a constructor in a championship race, claimed by Dan Gurney at the 1962 French Grand Prix. One week later, he repeated the success in front of Porsche's home crowd on Stuttgart's Solitude in a non-championship race. At the end of the season, Porsche withdrew from F1 due to the high costs, just having acquired the Reutter factory. Volkswagen and German branches of suppliers had no interest in an F1 commitment as this series was too far away from road cars. Privateers continued to enter the outdated Porsche 718 in F1 until 1964.

==== TAG Porsche ====
Having been very successful with turbocharged cars in the 1970s, Porsche returned to Formula One in 1983 after nearly two decades away, supplying water-cooled V6 turbo engines badged as TAG units for the McLaren team, as the partner electronics firm was paying for the whole engine program, with the deal they would be badged as TAG units. For aerodynamic reasons, the Porsche-typical flat engine was out of the question for being too wide. With turbo power being the way to go in F1 at the time a 90° V6 turbo engine was produced. The TAG engine was designed to very tight requirements issued by McLaren's chief designer John Barnard. He specified the physical layout of the engine to match the design of his proposed car. The engine was funded by TAG who retained the naming rights to it, although the engines bore "made by Porsche" identification. Initially, Porsche was reluctant to have their name on the engines, fearing bad publicity if they failed. However, within a few races of the 1984 season when it became evident that the engines were the ones to have, the "Made by Porsche" badges began to appear. TAG-Porsche-powered cars took two constructor championships in 1984 and 1985, and three driver crowns in 1984, 1985 and 1986. The engines powered McLaren to 25 victories between 1984 and 1987, with 19 for 1985 and 1986 World Champion Alain Prost, and 6 for 1984 Champion Niki Lauda.

Despite its overwhelming success, the TAG-Porsche engines were never the most powerful in Formula One as they did not have the ability to hold higher turbo boost like the rival BMW, Renault, Ferrari and Honda engines. The McLaren drivers who regularly raced with the engine (Lauda, Prost, Keke Rosberg and Stefan Johansson) continually asked Porsche to develop a special qualifying engine like their rivals. However, both Porsche and TAG owner Mansour Ojjeh balked at the requests due to the extra costs involved, reasoning that the proven race engines already had equal power and better fuel economy than all bar the Hondas, thus qualifying engines were never built. Though the lack of horsepower did not stop McLaren from claiming 7 pole positions (6 for Prost, 1 for Rosberg) and 21 front-row starts.

Porsche returned to F1 again in 1991 as an engine supplier, however, this time with disastrous results: The Footwork Arrows cars powered with the overweight Porsche 3512 double-V6 which weighed 400 pounds (180 kg), (according to various reports, including from McLaren designer Alan Jenkins, the engine was in fact 2 combined TAG V6 engines used by McLaren from 1983 to 1987 minus the turbochargers) failed to score a single point, and failed even to qualify for over half the races that year. After the Porsche engines were sacked by Footwork in favor of Cosworth DFRs, Porsche has not participated in Formula One since. According to reports from Arrows, the 3512's major problem, other than a lack of horsepower, was severe oil starvation problems which often led to engine failure.

==== Later attempts ====
During the 2010 Paris Motor Show, Porsche chairman Matthias Mueller made a statement hinting at a possible Porsche return to Formula 1. Specifically, Mueller stated that either Porsche or Audi would compete in Le Mans while the other would turn to Formula 1. Previously, Audi's motorsport boss Wolfgang Ulrich had already stated that Audi and Formula 1 "do not fit".

On 2 May 2022, Volkswagen Group's CEO Herbert Diess announced that Porsche would make their return to the sport alongside VW brand Audi. This will be Audi's first entry into the sport. On 27 July in Morocco, official information was published on the approval of an application submitted jointly by Porsche and Red Bull GmbH in which Porsche acquired 50% of the shares of the Red Bull program in Formula 1. This application had to be filed with the antitrust authorities of up to 20 countries, including outside the European Union. The press release was due to go out for the Austrian GP. However, the FIA did not approve the regulations for the 2026 engines before 29 June as planned, delaying official confirmation of Porsche's entry into Formula One. On 15 August, Porsche registered the "F1nally" trademark with the German Patent Office, which covers the development of different activities such as cultural and sports activities, technological and scientific services, industrial development, analysis and design, as well as the development and design of computer hardware and software, marketing and office functions, telecommunications and administration.

After months of speculation, Porsche AG confirmed in September that talks with Red Bull GmbH would not continue. The intention was to reach an engine and team partnership, based on equal footing but the negotiations never came to fruition. In March 2023, Porsche announced that they will not be joining Formula 1 in 2026.

=== IndyCar ===
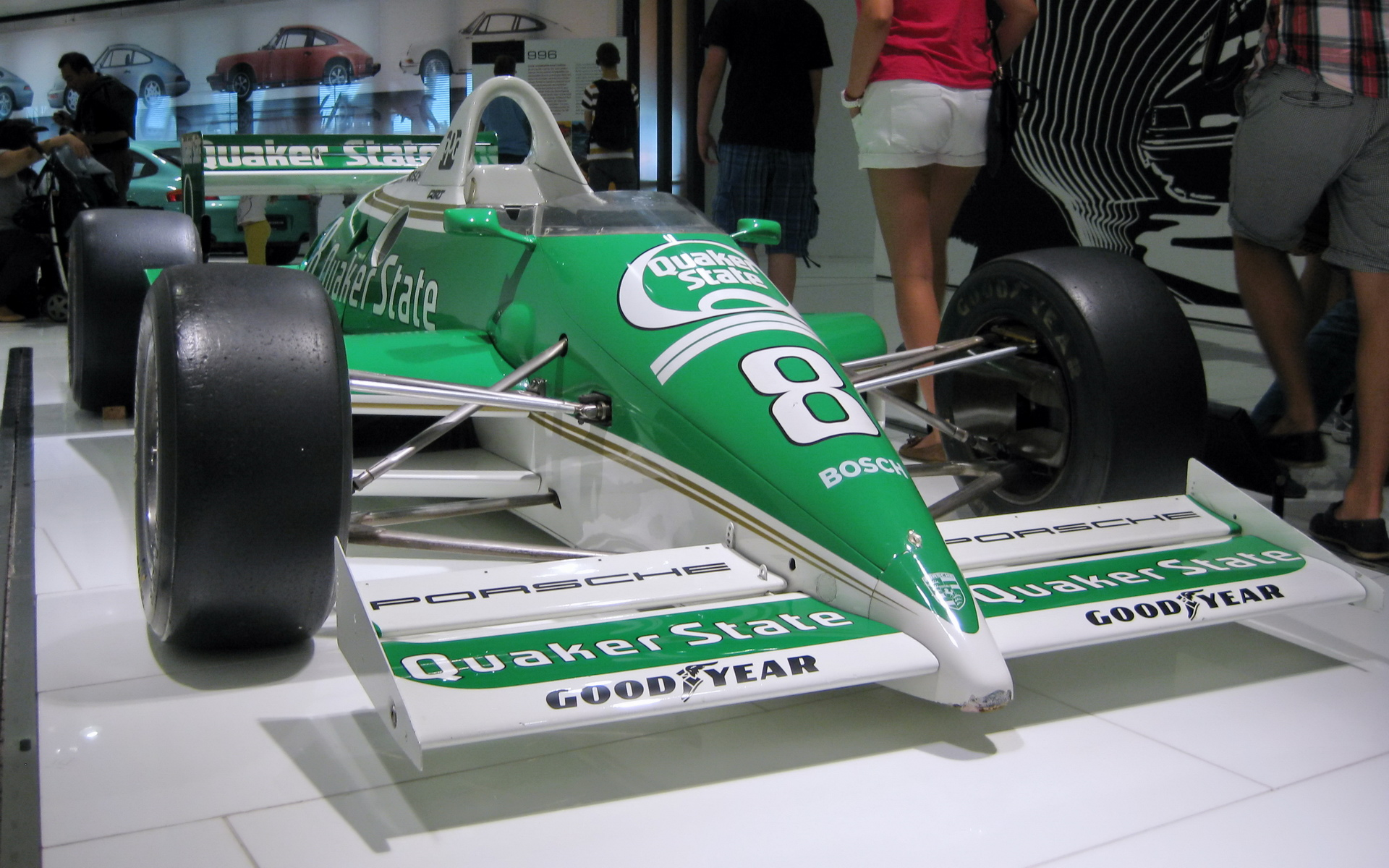
Teo Fabi's 1988 Porsche 2708

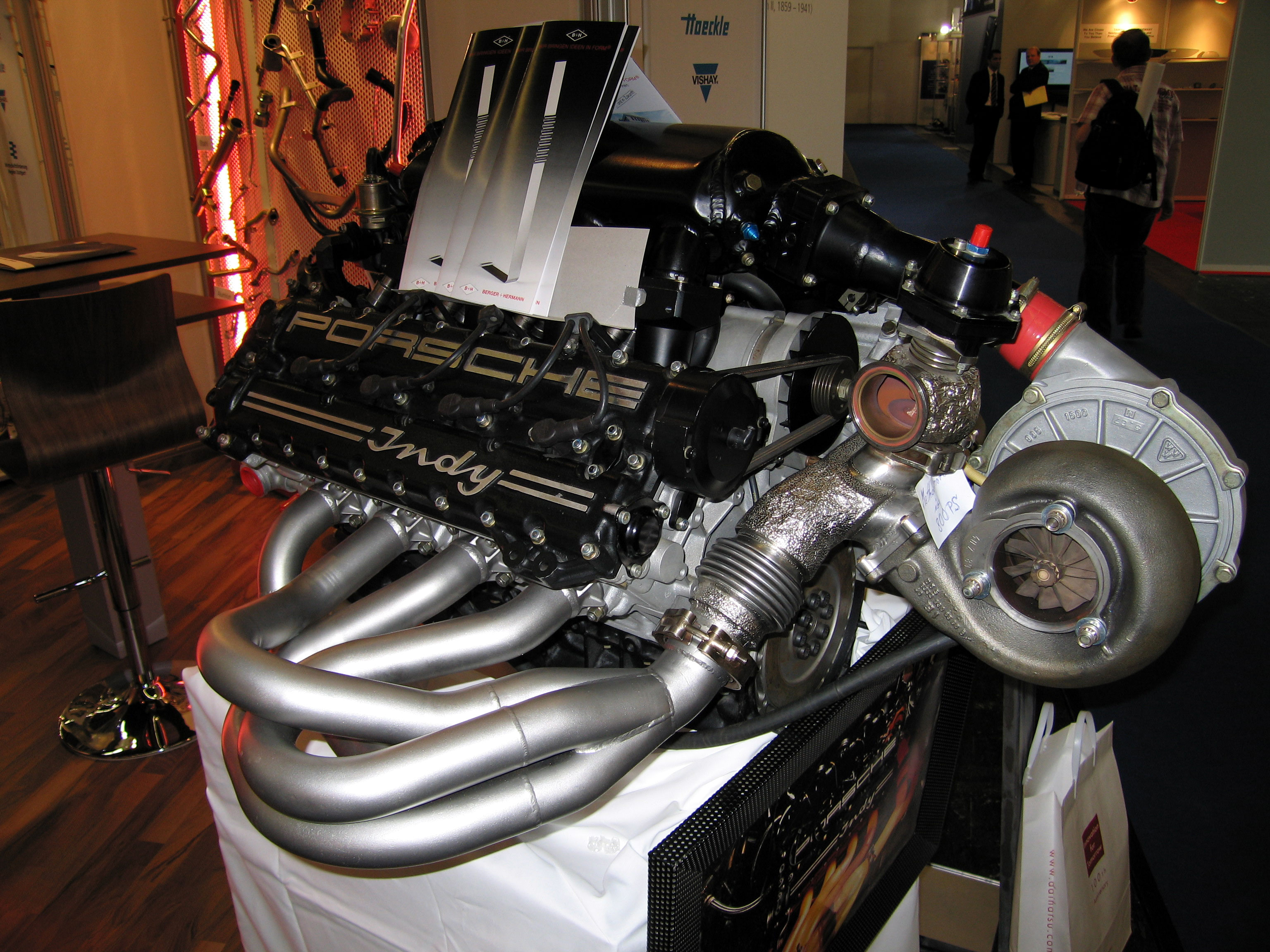
V8 engine for the Indy 500-race

Porsche first attempted to compete in the 1980 Indianapolis 500 with an engine initially based on the 935 sports car flat 6 with Interscope Racing as the entrant and Danny Ongais as driver. The engine would be fitted to Interscopes's new Interscope IR01, which featured a tubular rear subframe, as the Porsche motor could not be used as a stressed member as the Cosworth engines were. USAC had more favorable rules for stock-block engines at the Indy 500 than CART allowed at their races. Porsche applied to and received approval from USAC for their engine to be allowed the stock block boost pressure of 55 inches. After setting an unofficial lap record in private testing at the now-defunct Ontario Motor Speedway, a clone of the Indiana track, rumors circulated regarding the performance of the engine and top-level teams pressured officials to alter their initial ruling and now categorize the Porsche a race motor, dropping boost pressure to 48" thus losing its boost and horsepower advantage. Porsche withdrew and Interscope entered a Parnelli VPJ6C-Cosworth DFX at Indianapolis that year. The Indianapolis engine became the basis of the highly-successful 956/962 motor.

Porsche returned to CART in its 1987 season fielding Al Unser in the #6 Quaker State Porsche, with the chassis and engine both being Porsche only competing at the Champion Spark Plug 300K at Laguna Seca Raceway. Unser would qualify 21st out of 24 cars and would retire in 24th place after only seven laps due to a water pump failure. For 1988 Teo Fabi would drive the #8 Quaker State March 88C-Porsche getting a best finish of 4th at the Bosch Spark Plugs Grand Prix at Pennsylvania International Raceway, Fabi would finish tenth in points. For 1989 Fabi would drive the #8 Quaker State March 89P-Porsche qualifying on the pole position at both the Budweiser / G.I. Joe's 200 at Portland International Raceway and the Red Roof Inns 200 at Mid-Ohio Sports Car Course getting the win at the latter. Fabi would also give Porsche their best finish on an IndyCar oval by finishing 2nd at the Marlboro 500 at Michigan International Speedway.

In 1990 Porsche attempted to race a new car with carbon-fiber chassis, but CART banned it. The team expanded to two cars, fielding Fabi in the #4 Foster's/Quaker State March 90P-Porsche and John Andretti in the #41 Foster's March 90P-Porsche. Fabi would qualify on the pole position at the Texaco/Havoline Grand Prix of Denver at the Streets of Denver and would finish 3rd at the Marlboro Grand Prix at the Meadowlands at the Meadowlands Sports Complex but would drop to 14th in points. While Andretti would get a best finish of 5th at the Budweiser Grand Prix of Cleveland at Burke Lakefront Airport and at the Molson Indy Vancouver at the Streets of Vancouver and would finish tenth in points.

Porsche withdrew from IndyCar at the end of the 1990 season. Team director Derrick Walker bought the assets to become the owner of Walker Racing.

=== Formula E ===
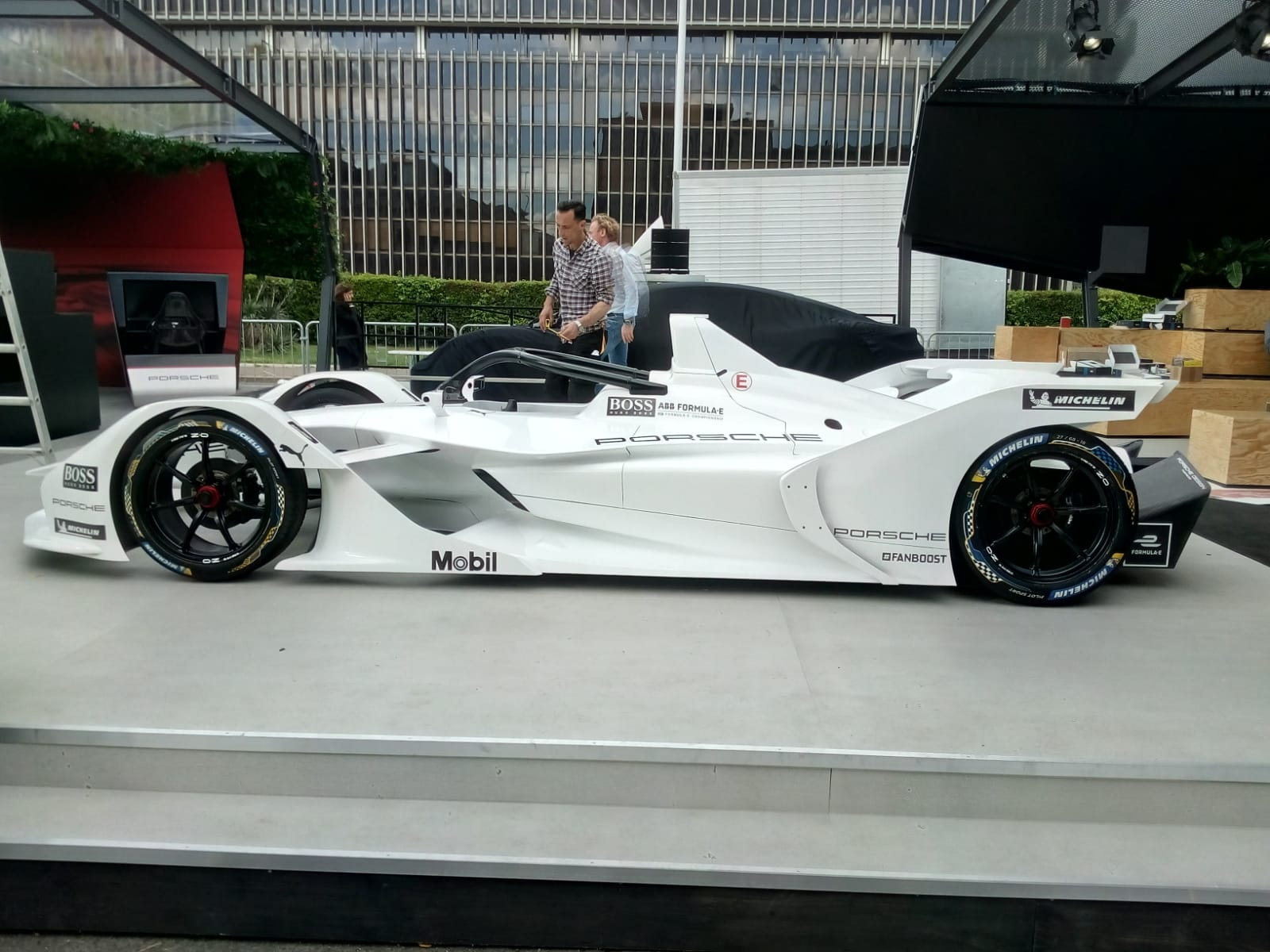
The Spark SRT05e in a Porsche demo livery at the 2019 Rome ePrix.

In July 2017, Porsche confirmed that they would leave the FIA World Endurance Championship at the end of the season in order to focus on their Formula E campaign, which was set to begin with the 2019–20 season. This meant that Porsche would be entering the series at the same time as the Mercedes-Benz EQ Formula E Team, though the latter already competed in the 2018–19 season through the affiliated HWA Racelab team.

Entering FE and achieving success in this category are the logical outcomes of our Mission E road car programme. The growing freedom for in-house technology developments makes FE attractive to us. For us, FE is the ultimate competitive environment for driving forward the development of high performance vehicles in areas such as environmental friendliness, efficiency and sustainability.

— Michael Steiner, "Porsche quits WEC LMP1 class for Formula E programme, Autosport.com (28 July 2017)

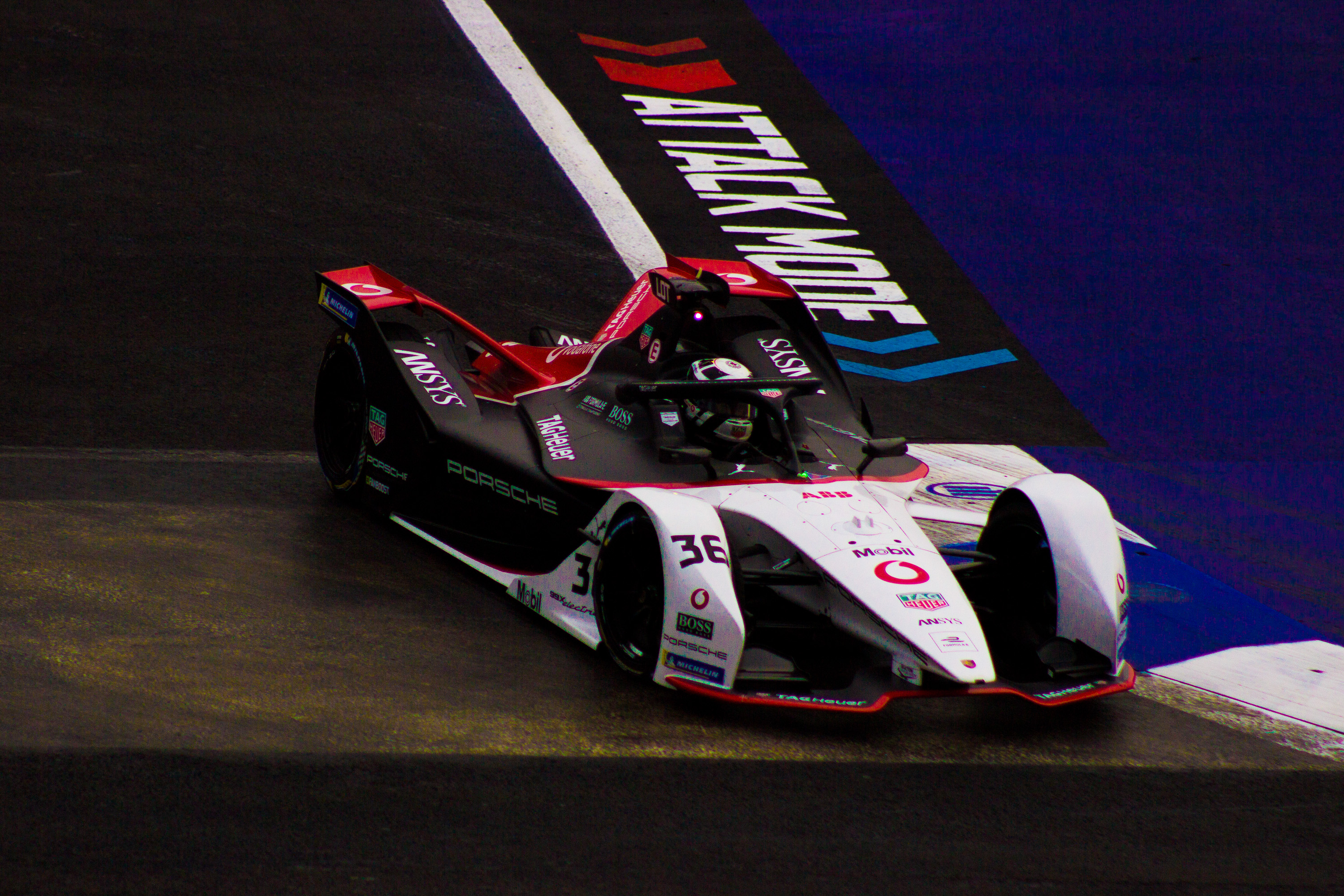
André Lotterer who qualified Porsche's first in Formula E pole position at the 2020 Mexico City ePrix.

In December 2018, Neel Jani was announced as the first driver to drive for the new team. Brendon Hartley was also involved in the development of the new car. Porsche were then evaluating whether to sign the inexperienced Hartley or not. In July 2019, Porsche announced the former Techeetah driver André Lotterer would be joining the Porsche team. In September, Porsche announced Simona de Silvestro who drove for Venturi Racing at the December 2018 Ad Diriyah test, where she placed tenth overall, fastest of the nine women that took part and Porsche Carrera Cup Germany driver Thomas Preining as their new development drivers after Hartley got signed to the GEOX Dragon team. André Lotterer qualified Porsche's first in Formula E pole position at the 2020 Mexico City ePrix, but during the race Lotterer clipped a wall on the exit of turn 3, which stuck an advertising banner into the bodywork of his car, which created a cloud of smoke behind him. The bodywork eventually fell off, but the car was already damaged, which forced Lotterer to pit and subsequently retire from the race. On 1 March 2020, Preining and Frédéric Makowiecki were brought to the Marrakesh rookie test, with Preining posting the fifteenth best lap and Makowiecki ending up the slowest of all drivers who partook the test.

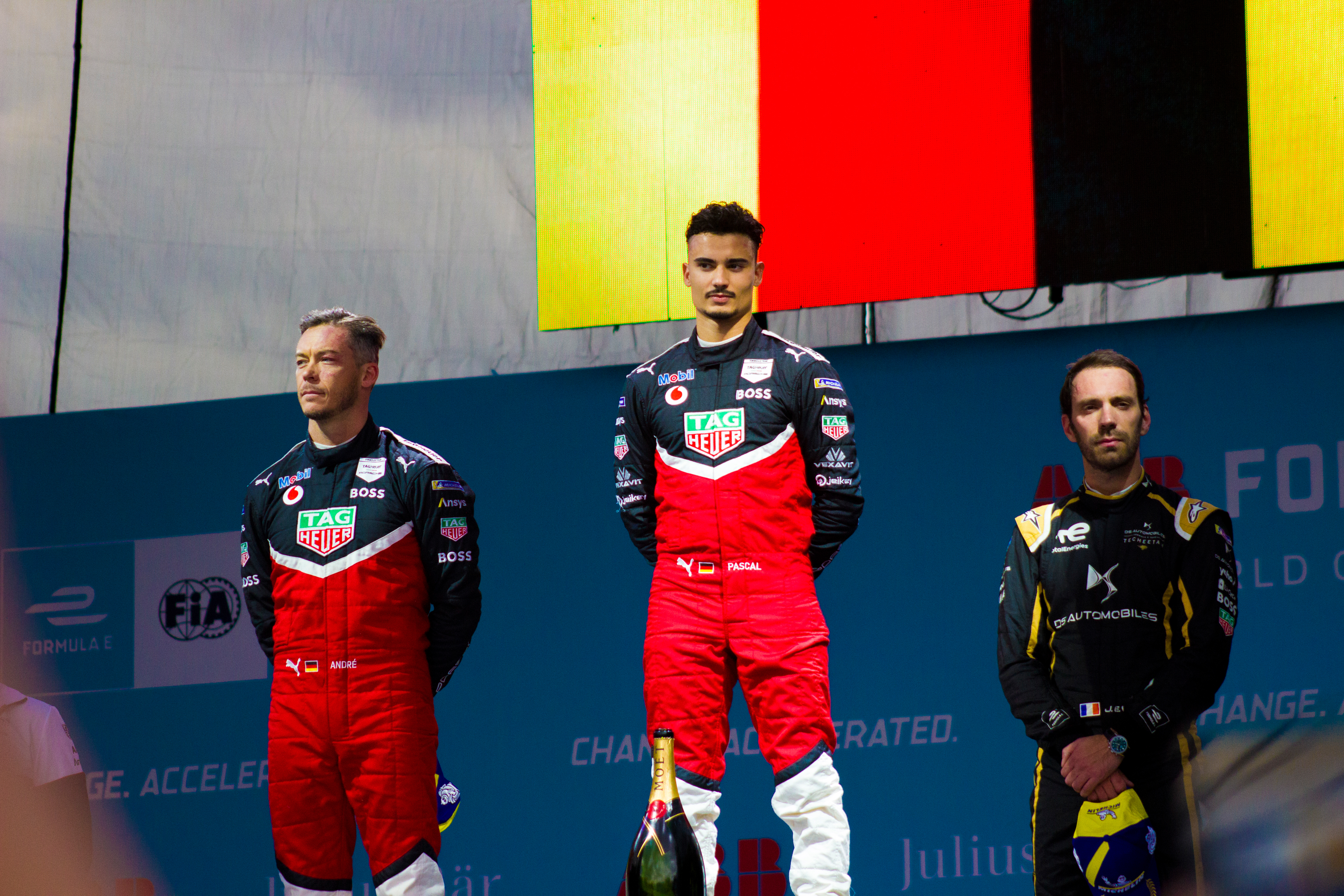
Pascal Wehrlein winning the 2022 Mexico City ePrix with André Lotterer (left) in second place, and Jean-Éric Vergne (right) in third place.

In August 2020, it was confirmed that former Mahindra Racing driver Pascal Wehrlein would be joining the Porsche team, replacing Neel Jani. At the 2021 Puebla ePrix, Pascal Wehrlein qualified his first pole position with Porsche and crossed the finish line first, before being disqualified after his team failed to declare his tyre set. At the 2022 Mexico City ePrix, Pascal Wehrlein claimed his and the team's maiden victory after taking pole position. The team also claimed their first 1-2 finish as Lotterer finished 2nd.

In the 2022–23 Formula E World Championship, former DS Techeetah driver António Félix da Costa replaced André Lotterer who moved to Porsche's customer team Avalanche Andretti Formula E and Porsche's new FIA World Endurance Championship Hypercar Project to partner with Wehrlein. Along customer team Avalanche Andretti Formula E, the Porsche powertrain dominated the early season, with Wehrlein winning both Diriyah rounds and leading both drivers' and teams' championships. The team scored two more victories with Félix da Costa winning the 2023 Cape Town ePrix and Wehrlein the 2023 Jakarta ePrix. However, the team eventually finished 4th in the Teams' Championship, Pascal Wehrlein finishing 4th and António Félix da Costa finishing 9th in the Drivers' Championship.

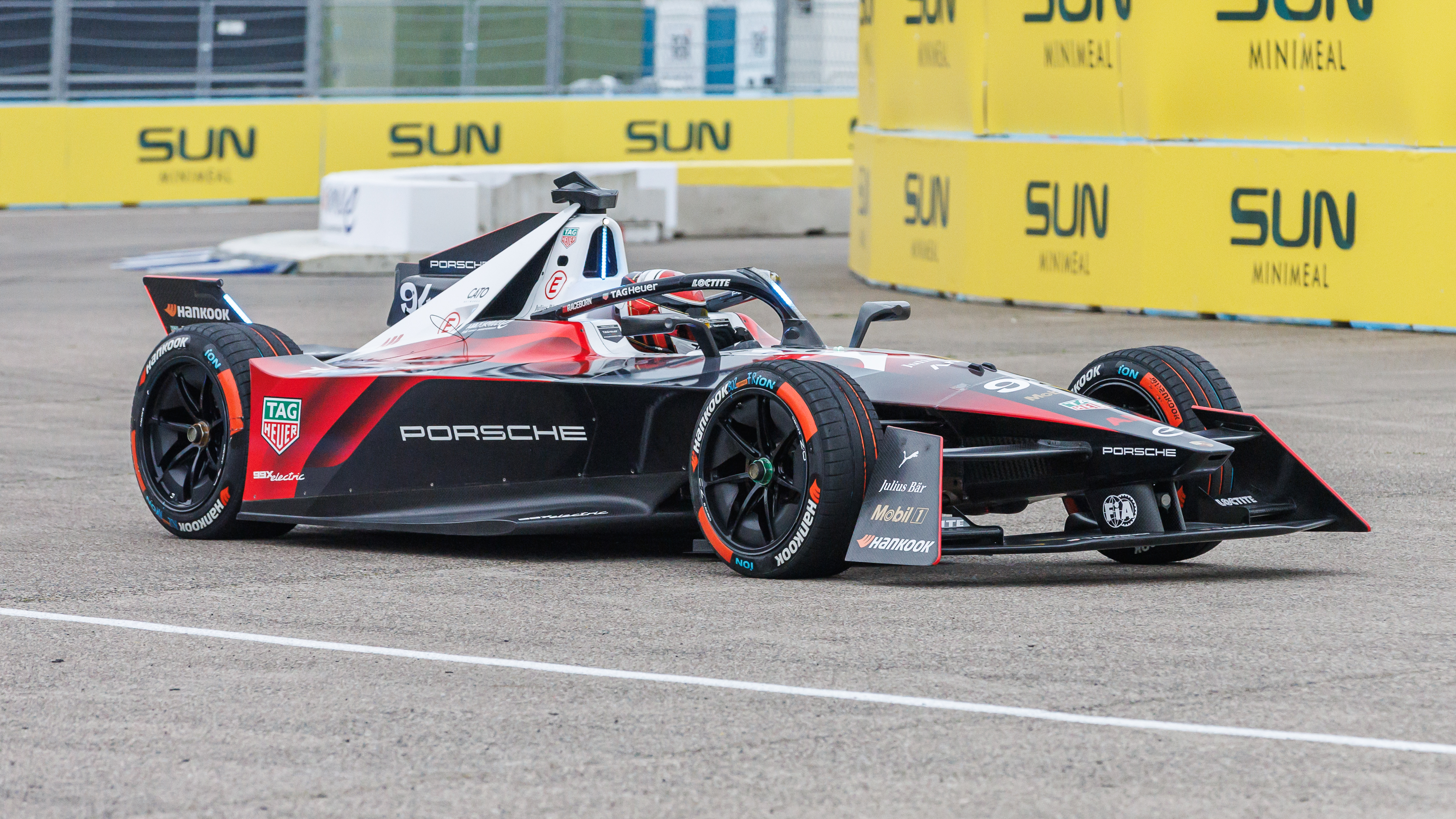
Pascal Wehrlein at the 2024 Berlin ePrix Race One where he finished 5th overall, 0.129 seconds in front his teammate António Félix da Costa and 5.631 seconds behind race winner Nick Cassidy who raced for Jaguar Formula E Team.

In the 2023–24 Formula E World Championship, Porsche has retained their driver lineup of Wehrlein and Félix da Costa. The team also signed André Lotterer as a reserve driver. Porsche began strongly once again, scoring pole for the season-opener and securing the first win of the season at the Mexico City ePrix. The maiden Misano ePrix proved to be a double-edged sword for Porsche, with Wehrlein after crashing into Jean-Éric Vergne in race 1 profited from an energy miscalculation by Oliver Rowland and the Nissan team to inherit victory on the last lap. Following a scrappy Berlin weekend, one in which Wehrlein came to blows multiple times with reigning champion Jake Dennis, the German finished second at Shanghai, losing the lead on the final lap to Mitch Evans but keeping second against Nick Cassidy with an aggressive defense that led to contact between the two cars. Wehrlein gained points against championship leader Cassidy with two top ten finishes at Portland, going into the final 2 round at London with a 12-point deficit to the Kiwi. On Race 1, Wehrlein battled Evans to win the race, thus gaining the championship lead. On Race 2, Wehrlein kept himself between the two Jaguars of Evans and Cassidy for the majority of the race. When Cassidy retired following a puncture and Evans missed his second attack mode activation, Wehrlein finished second, clinching the title six points ahead of Evans. The team finished both Teams' Championship and Manufacturers' Trophy in second place with 7 race wins, with 3 for Wehrlein and 4 for Félix da Costa.

Both drivers were retained for Season 11, with Wehrlein entering the season as defending champion. The season saw Porsche winning 1 race, finishing on the podium 10 times and retiring 4 times. Wehrlein scored Porsche's only race win at Homestead–Miami. Porsche secured both the teams' and manufacturers' championship, with Jaguar second in both followed by Nissan. Wehrlein finish 3rd in the Drivers' Championship while Félix da Costa only managed 5th.

Porsche is currently supplying their Gen-3 Evo Porsche 99X Electric to Cupra Kiro Formula E team and Andretti Formula E team.

=== Carrera Cup and amateur racing ===
For more information about the team's results, see Porsche Carrera Cup.

Porsche Carrera Cup (sometimes abbreviated PCC) is a number of one-make racing by Porsche premier series competed with, initially Porsche 911 Carrera Cup, then later Porsche 911 GT3 Cup cars. The cars are specifically built by Porsche for one-make racing, but are visually and mechanically quite similar to road-registrable 911s of the same generation.

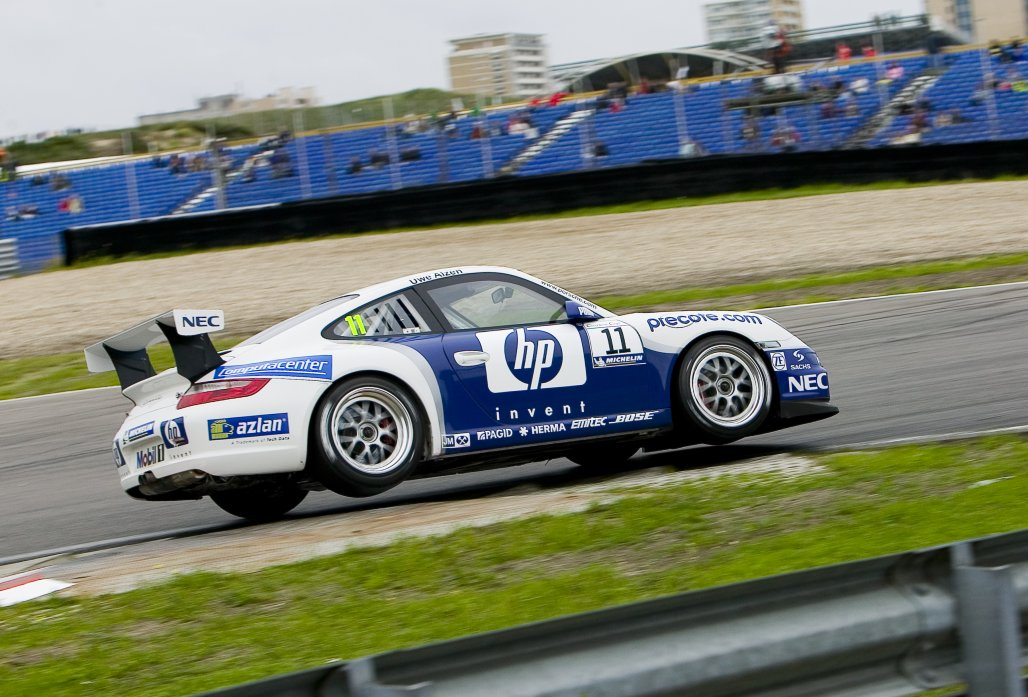
Uwe Alzen driving in a Porsche Carrera Cup Germany 997 cup car in 2006

There are three distinct tiers of racing, the top tier is the Porsche Supercup. Today the Supercup races as part of the support program of the FIA Formula 1 World Championship on most, if not all, of the Grands Prix held in Europe, and occasionally Grands Prix in Asia and North America. Established in 1993, it is the most prestigious one-make series for GT cars.

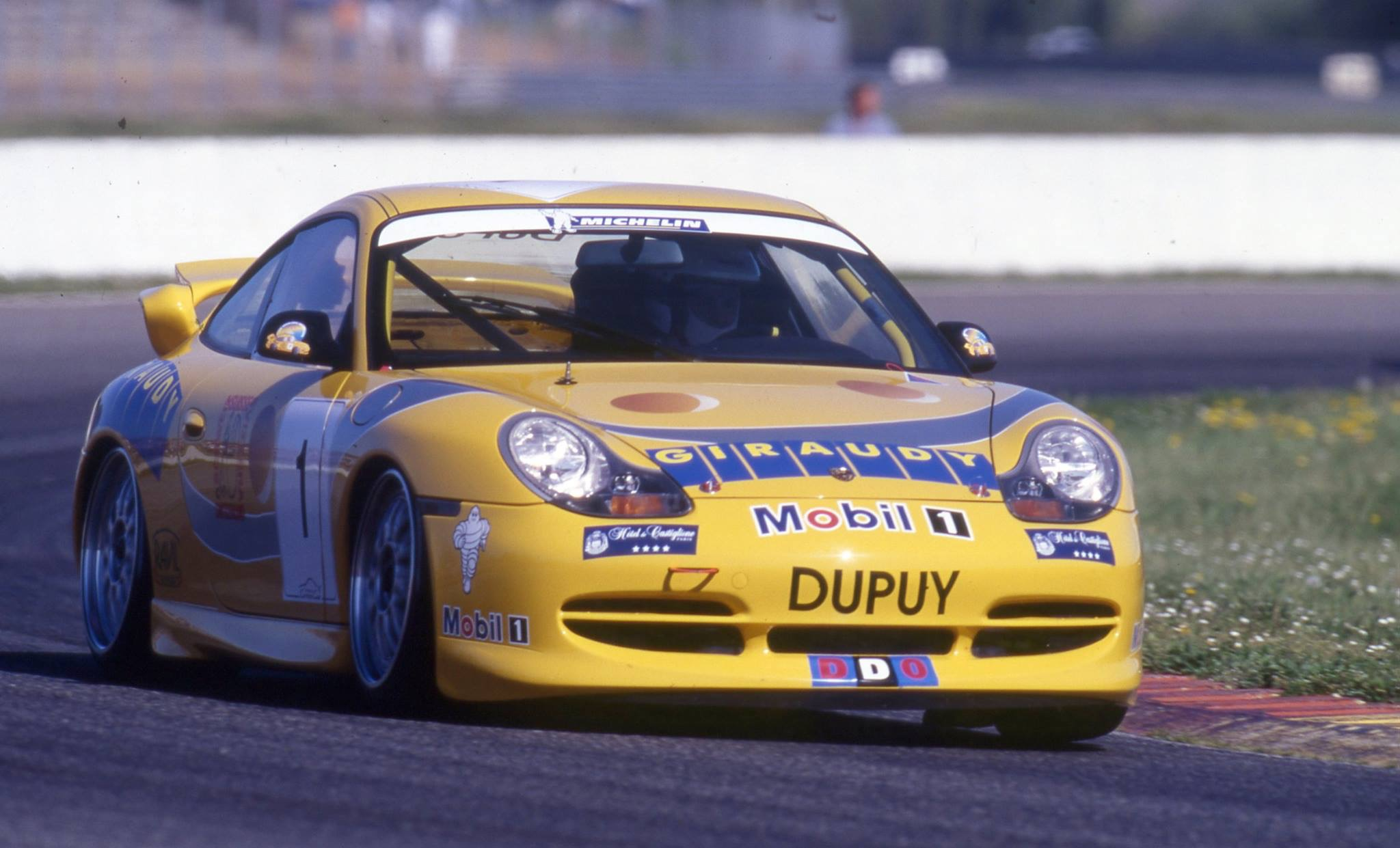
Dominique Dupuy driving a Porsche Carrera Cup France 996 cup car in 1999

The second tier are the national Carrera Cups, held in Australia, France, Germany, Italy, Japan and the United Kingdom as well as International Carrera Cups held across multiple nations in eastern Asia and in the Scandinavian nations of Denmark, Finland, Norway and Sweden. The longest running is the Porsche Carrera Cup Germany, which was also the original series, first held in 1986 using the Porsche 964 Cup racing car. Now in its 39th year it has been one of the world's best known Pro-Am GT series and helped to progress many future World Endurance Champions, Le Mans winners and today is the primary feeder for the Porsche Supercup with many racing teams contesting both series. The Porsche Carrera Cup France began just a year later in 1987. The early 2000s saw a proliferation of Carrera Cups with Great Britain, Australia, Asia and Scandinavia all starting in a four-year burst with Italy following in 2007.

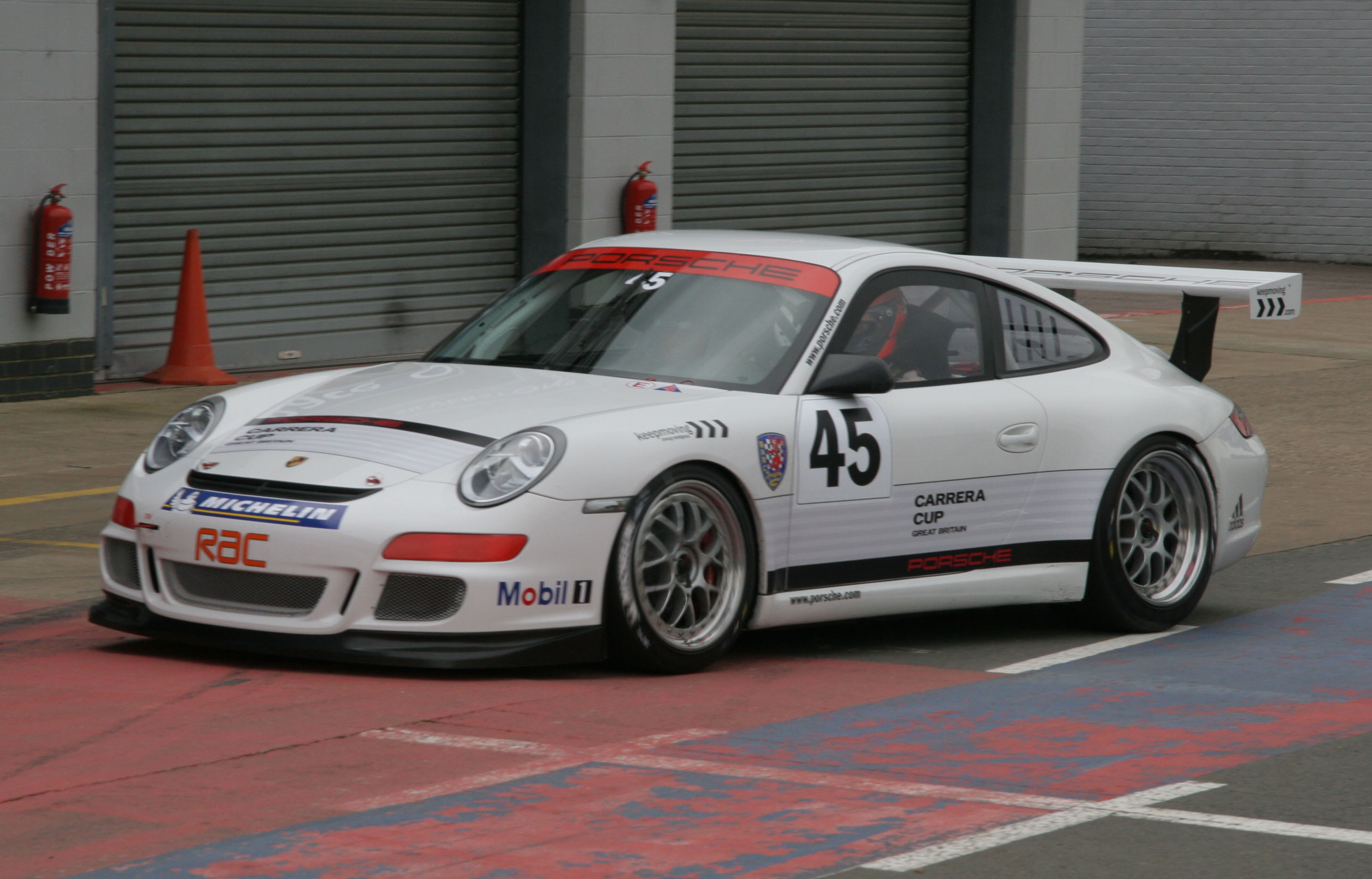
Porsche Carrera Cup 997 cup car at Silverstone in 2008

The third tier is the Porsche GT3 Cup Challenge or Porsche GT3 Cup Trophy, recently renamed in some markets as the Porsche Sprint Challenge. This is a mixture of smaller series in Europe, Switzerland based series, Benelux series held across Belgium, the Netherlands and Luxembourg, a Central European series, a Middle East series in the Gulf States, as well as larger series in the Americas; United States, Brazil and Argentina. As well as New Zealand and some which act as a second tier series within Carrera Cup nations. Some GT3 Cup Challenge series will use older Carrera Cup cars from previous generations of the Porsche 911. New Zealand and Australian GT3 Cup Challenges use second hand cars from Carrera Cup Australia series as an example, although largers series, particularly United States and Brazil are effectively Carrera Cups. GT3 Cup Trophies are essentially second tier GT3 Cup Challenges. Superseded Carrera Cup and GT3 Cup Cars have also become popular cars to race in domestic GT series on five continents.

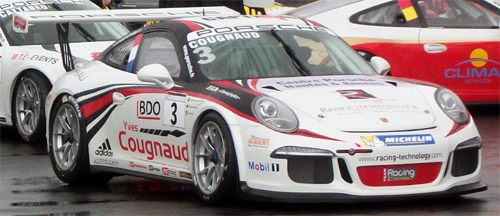
2014 Porsche Carrera Cup France 991 cup car of Alexandre Cougnaud

Dutch racer Patrick Huisman is the most successful Carrera Cup racer having won four Supercups consecutively between 1997 and 2000. German driver René Rast won three Supercups (2010–12) and two German Carrera Cups (2008 & 2012). Dominique Dupuy won the French Carrera Cup five times between 1992 and 1999 and New Zealander Craig Baird won the Australian Carrera Cup five times between 2006 and 2013. Christophe Bouchut won the French Carrera Cup four times around Dupuy's five titles, the two dominating the French series for a decade. Dutch driver Larry ten Voorde is currently the defending champion of the Porsche Supercup.

The one-make GT series model has also been used for other Porsche models, usually the entry level Porsche of the time, 924, 944, 968 and Boxster and has proliferated to other manufacturers as well; Ferrari Challenge, Lamborghini Super Trofeo, Trofeo Maserati, Audi R8 LMS Cup, Lotus Cup, MGF Trophy and a multitude of series based on the Mazda MX-5.

==== Championships ====
===== International =====
- Porsche Supercup
- Porsche Carrera World Cup
- International Race of Champions USA (IROC I)

===== Carrera Cup =====
- Porsche Carrera Cup Asia
- Porsche Carrera Cup Australia
- Porsche Carrera Cup Benelux
- Porsche Carrera Cup Brasil
- Porsche Carrera Cup France
- Porsche Carrera Cup Germany
- Porsche Carrera Cup Great Britain
- Porsche Carrera Cup Italy
- Porsche Carrera Cup Japan
- Porsche Carrera Cup Scandinavia
- Porsche Carrera Cup North America
- Porsche Carrera Cup Middle East

===== Sprint Challenge =====
- Porsche GT3 Cup Trophy Argentina
- Porsche Sprint Challenge Australia
- Porsche Sprint Challenge Benelux
- Porsche Sprint Challenge Brasil
- Porsche Sprint Challenge Central Europe
- Porsche Sprint Challenge China
- Porsche Sprint Challenge France
- Porsche Sprint Challenge Germany
- Porsche Sprint Challenge Great Britain
- Porsche Sprint Challenge Japan
- Porsche Sprint Challenge Middle East
- Porsche Sprint Challenge North America
- Porsche Sprint Challenge North European Zone
- Porsche Sprint Challenge Scandinavia
- Porsche Sprint Challenge Southern Europe
- Porsche Sprint Challenge USA West
- Porsche Sprint Challenge Indonesia

=== Other motorsports ===
Porsche dropped its factory motorsports program after winning the 1998 24 Hours of Le Mans with the Porsche 911 GT1 for financial reasons, facing factory competition from Audi, BMW, Mercedes-Benz, Toyota, and others. An LMP1 prototype with a V10 engine, intended to be entered in 2000, was abandoned unraced due to an agreement with Audi, a related company led by Porsche co-owner Ferdinand Piech. The V10 was used in the Porsche Carrera GT instead, while Audi dominated Le Mans after BMW, Mercedes and Toyota moved to F1.

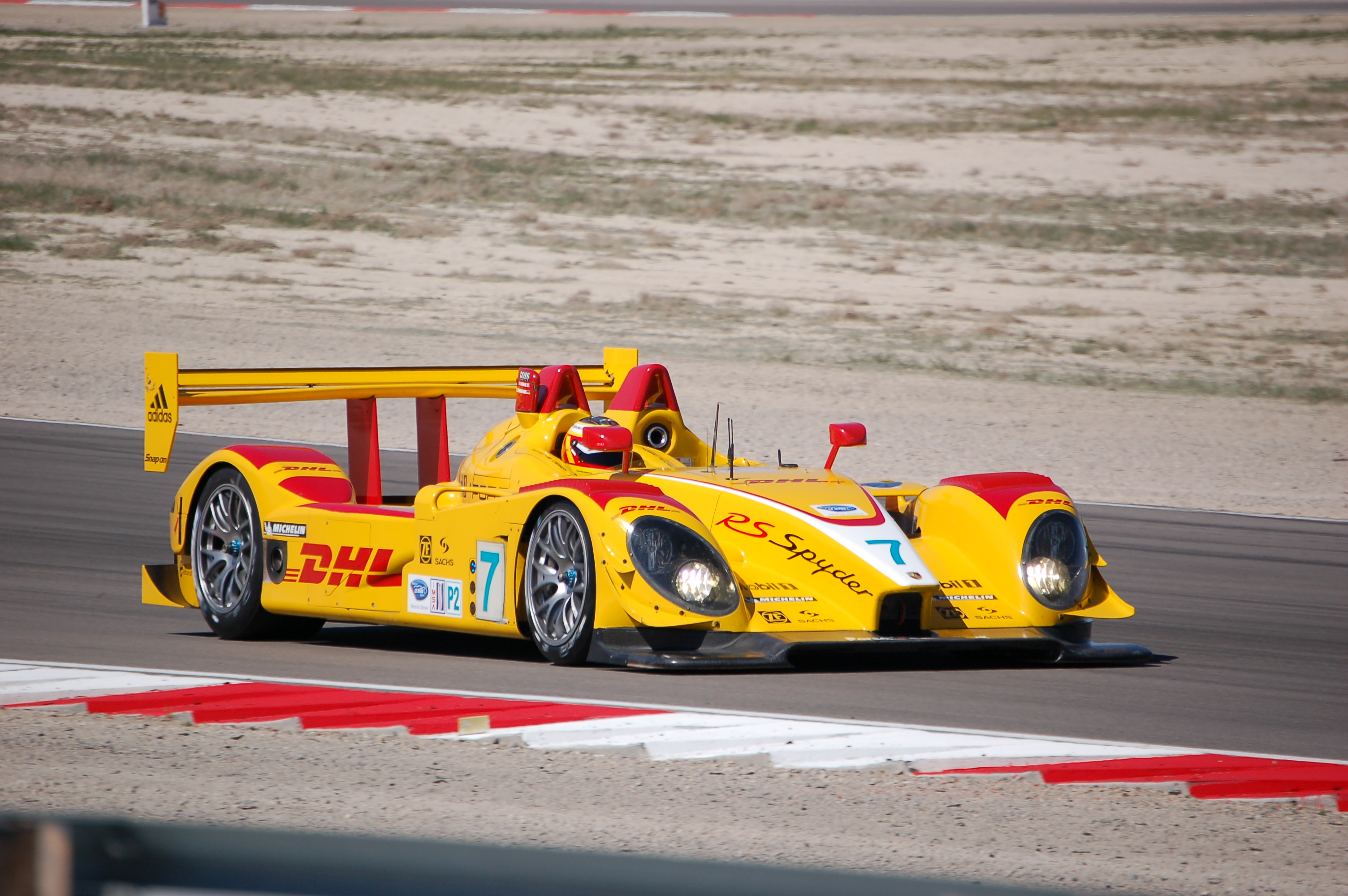
Penske Racing's No. 7 Porsche RS Spyder LMP2 in the 2008 Larry H. Miller Dealerships Utah Grand Prix taken place at of the 2008 American Le Mans Series season taken place at Miller Motorsports Park, Utah on May 18, 2008. driven by Timo Bernhard and Romain Dumas.

Porsche made a comeback in the LMP2 category in 2005 with the new RS Spyder prototype, although this was run by closely associated customer teams rather than by the works. This was not welcomed very much, as rule-makers intended the LMP1 category for factory entries, with the LMP2 reserved for privateers. Based on LMP2 regulations, the RS Spyder made its debut for Roger Penske's team at Mazda Raceway Laguna Seca during the final race of the 2005 American Le Mans Series season, and immediately garnered a class win in the LMP2 class finishing 5th overall. The nimble albeit less powerful (due to the regulations) RS Spyder clearly possessed the pace to challenge Audi and Lola LMP1 cars in the ALMS. Penske Racing won the LMP2 championship on its first full season in 2006 and against Acura in 2007 and 2008. 2007 was the most successful year for the RS Spyder, winning 8 overall races and 11 class wins while the Audi R10 from the larger LMP1 class won only 4 overall victories. The car debuted on European circuits in 2008 and dominated the Le Mans Series; Van Merksteijn Motorsport, Team Essex, and Horag Racing taking the first three places in the LMP2 championship. Van Merksteijn Motorsport took a class victory at the 2008 24 Hours of Le Mans and Team Essex won the LMP2 class at the 2009 24 Hours of Le Mans.

The Daytona Prototype Action Express Racing Riley-Porsche won the 2010 24 Hours of Daytona. This was unusual since the Riley-Porsche was powered by a Porsche Cayenne SUV-based 5.0-litre V8. Porsche refused to develop the V8 for the Grand-Am competition and was, instead, built by the Texas-based Lozano Brothers. Since it was not officially sanctioned by Porsche, the company did not technically claim the win.

== Factory drivers ==
=== Current ===
- (France) Julien Andlauer
- (Australia) Matt Campbell
- (Denmark) Michael Christensen
- (France) Kévin Estre
- (Turkey) Ayhancan Güven
- (Germany) Laurin Heinrich
- (Austria) Richard Lietz
- (Switzerland) Nico Müller
- (Brazil) Felipe Nasr
- (Austria) Thomas Preining
- (United Kingdom) Nick Tandy
- (Belgium) Laurens Vanthoor
- (Germany) Pascal Wehrlein

=== Former ===
- (United States) Al Holbert
- (Germany) André Lotterer
- (United Kingdom) Andy Rouse
- (Portugal) António Félix da Costa
- (Netherlands) Ben Pon
- (Sweden) Björn Waldegård
- (France) Bob Wollek
- (United Kingdom) Brian Redman
- (New Zealand) Brendon Hartley
- (Netherlands) Carel Godin de Beaufort
- (France) Claude Ballot-Léna
- (United Kingdom) Colin Davis
- (United States) Dane Cameron
- (United Kingdom) Derek Bell
- (Germany) Dieter Glemser
- (Germany) Dirk Werner
- (New Zealand) Earl Bamber
- (Germany) Edgar Barth
- (France) Frédéric Makowiecki
- (Germany) Gerhard Mitter
- (France) Gérard Larrousse
- (Italy) Gianmaria Bruni
- (Germany) Günter Klass
- (Germany) Hans Herrmann
- (Germany) Hans-Joachim Stuck
- (Switzerland) Heinz Schiller
- (Austria) Helmut Marko
- (France) Henri Pescarolo
- (Germany) Herbert Linge
- (Switzerland) Herbert Müller
- (United States) Hurley Haywood
- (Brazil) Hélio Castroneves
- (Belgium) Jacky Ickx
- (France) Jean Behra
- (Sweden) Jo Bonnier
- (Switzerland) Jo Siffert
- (Germany) Jochen Mass
- (Germany) Jochen Neerpasch
- (Austria) Jochen Rindt
- (United States) Joe Buzzetta
- (United States) John Andretti
- (Germany) Jörg Bergmeister
- (Germany) Jörg Müller
- (Germany) Jürgen Barth
- (Netherlands) Kees Nierop
- (Germany) Kurt Ahrens Jr.
- (Germany) Lucas Luhr
- (Liechtenstein) Manfred Schurti
- (Germany) Marc Lieb
- (Germany) Marco Holzer
- (United States) Mark Donohue
- (United States) Mario Andretti
- (Australia) Mark Webber
- (France) Mathieu Jaminet
- (United States) Michael Andretti
- (Switzerland) Neel Jani
- (United States) Patrick Long
- (France) Patrick Pilet
- (United States) Peter Gregg
- (Germany) Reinhold Joest
- (Germany) Richard von Frankenberg
- (Germany) Rolf Stommelen
- (France) Romain Dumas
- (Austria) Rudi Lins
- (Australia) Ryan Briscoe
- (Switzerland) Simona de Silvestro
- (Germany) Stefan Bellof
- (United States) Steve Luvender
- (Germany) Sven Müller
- (Belgium) Thierry Boutsen
- (Germany) Timo Bernhard
- (United Kingdom) Tony Dron
- (South Africa) Tony Maggs
- (Germany) Udo Schütz
- (Italy) Umberto Maglioli
- (Germany) Uwe Alzen
- (Australia) Vern Schuppan
- (United Kingdom) Vic Elford
- (Germany) Walter Röhrl
- (Germany) Willi Kauhsen
- (Germany) Wolf Henzler
- (Germany) Wolfgang Graf Berghe von Trips

== Racecars ==
Year	Car	Image	Category
1949	Cisitalia Grand Prix		Grand Prix
1951	Porsche 356SL		Sports Car
1953	Porsche 550		Sports Car; Formula One; Formula Two
1956	Porsche 645		Sports Car
1957	Porsche 718		Sports Car
1958	Porsche 718		Formula One; Formula Two
1960	Porsche 787		Formula One
1962	Porsche 804		Formula One
1964	Porsche 904		Group 3
1966	Porsche 906		Group 4 Group 6
1966	Porsche 910		Group 7
1967	Porsche 907		Group 7
1968	Porsche 908/01		Group 6
1968	Porsche 909 Bergspyder		Group 4
1969	Porsche 908/02		Group 6
1969	Porsche 917		Group 5
1970	Porsche 908/03		Group 6
1972	Porsche 908		Group 5
1973	Porsche 911 Carrera RSR		IMSA GTO
1973	Porsche Carrera RSR		IROC I
1976	Porsche 908		Group 6
1976	Porsche 934		Group 4
1976	Porsche 935		Group 5
1976	Porsche 936		Group 6
1977	Porsche 934/5		Group 4
1982	Porsche 956		Group C
1984	Porsche 953		Rally raid
1984	Porsche 962		Group C IMSA GTP; LMP
1986	Porsche 961		Group B
1993	Porsche 930 S		IMSA GTS
1993	Porsche 930 Turbo		IMSA GTS
1994	Porsche 962 GTi		LMP1
1995	Porsche 911 Carrera RS 3.8		Group GT2
1996	Porsche 911 GT1		Group GT1
1996	Porsche 911 Carrera RS 3.8		Group GT2
1996	Porsche 911 Turbo GT2		Group GT2
1996	Porsche WSC-95		LMP
1997	Porsche 911 GT1 Evo		Group GT1
1998	Porsche 911 GT1-98		Group GT1
1998	Porsche 996 GT3 Cup		GT3
1998	Porsche LMP1-98		LMP
1999	Porsche 911 GT3 Cup		Group GT2
1999	Porsche 911 GT3 R (996.I)		LM GTE
2000	Porsche LMP2000		LMP900
2001	Porsche 911 GT3 RS (996.I)		LM GTE
2004	Porsche 911 GT3 RSR (996.II)		LM GTE
2006	Porsche 911 GT3 RSR (997)		LM GTE
2006	Porsche RS Spyder		LMP2
2007	Porsche 911 GT3 Cup		Group GT3
2008	Porsche 911 GT3 Cup S		Group GT3
2010	Porsche 911 GT3 R		Group GT3
2013	Porsche 911 RSR (991.I)		LM GTE
2014	Porsche 919 Hybrid		LMP1
2014	Porsche 996 GT3		Group R-GT
2014	Porsche 997 GT3		Group R-GT
2016	Porsche 911 GT3 R		Group GT3
2017	Porsche 911 RSR (991.II)		LM GTE
2018	Porsche 911 GT2 RS Clubsport		SRO GT2
2019	Porsche 99X Electric		Formula E
2019	Porsche 911 GT3 R		Group GT3
2019	Porsche 911 RSR-19 (991.II)		LM GTE
2022	Porsche 99X Electric		Formula E
2022	Porsche 911 GT3 R		Group GT3
2023	Porsche 963		LMDh

== Major victories and championships ==
- 12 World Sportscar Championship Manufacturers' and Team Titles: 1969, 1970, 1971, 1976, 1977, 1978, 1979, 1982, 1983, 1984, 1985, 1986
- 3 FIA World Endurance Championship Manufacturers' Titles: 2015, 2016, 2017
- 6 World Sportscar Championship Drivers' Titles: 1981, 1982, 1983, 1984, 1985, 1986
- 4 FIA World Endurance Championship Drivers' Titles: 2015, 2016, 2017, 2024
- 2 FIA World Endurance Championship GT Manufacturers' Titles: 2015, 2018–19
- 2 FIA World Endurance Championship GT Drivers' Titles: 2015, 2018-19
- 2 IMSA SportsCar Championship Manufacturers' Titles: 2024 , 2025
- 2 IMSA SportsCar Championship Drivers' Titles: 2024 , 2025
- 1 Intercontinental Le Mans Cup GT2 Team Title: 2010
- 19 24 Hours of Le Mans: 1970, 1971, 1976, 1977, 1979, 1981, 1982, 1983, 1984, 1985, 1986, 1987, 1994, 1996, 1997, 1998, 2015, 2016, 2017
- 19 12 Hours of Sebring: 1960, 1968, 1971, 1973, 1976, 1977, 1978, 1979, 1980, 1981, 1982, 1983, 1984, 1985, 1986, 1987, 1988, 2008, 2025
- 21 Daytona 24 Hours as Manufacturer: 1968, 1970, 1971, 1973, 1975, 1977, 1978, 1979, 1980, 1981, 1982, 1983, 1985, 1986, 1987, 1989, 1991, 2003, 2024, 2025, 2026
- 13 24 Hours Nürburgring as Manufacturer: 1976, 1977, 1978, 1988, 1993, 2000, 2006, 2007, 2008, 2009, 2011, 2018, 2021
- 8 Spa 24 Hours as Manufacturer: 1967, 1968, 1969, 1993, 2003, 2010, 2019, 2020
- 1 Petit Le Mans: 2015
- 11 Targa Florio: 1956, 1959, 1960, 1963, 1964, 1966, 1967, 1968, 1969, 1970, 1973
- 3 IMSA Supercar-Series: 1991, 1992, 1993
- 6 German Racing Championship (DRM): 1977, 1979, 1982, 1983, 1984, 1985
- 20 European Hill Climbing Championship
- 15 IMSA Supercar-Race (US)
- 1 International Championship for Manufacturers: 1970
- 4 Rallye Monte Carlo: 1968, 1969, 1970, 1978
- 2 Paris-Dakar Rally: 1984, 1986
- 24 Formula E victories: 2021–22, 1 win; 2022–23, 6 wins; 2023–24, 8 wins; 2024–25, 2 wins; 2025–26, 7 wins;
- 3 Formula E Drivers' Championships: 2022–23, 2023–24, 2025–26
- 1 Formula E Teams' Championship: 2024–25
- 2 Formula E Manufacturer's Championships: 2024–25, 2025–26
- 1 Formula One victory: 1962
- 1 CART victory: 1989

=== TAG-Porsche engine in McLaren cars ===
- 3 Formula One World Drivers' Championships: 1984, 1985, 1986
- 2 Formula One World Constructors' Championships: 1984, 1985
- 25 Formula One victories: 1984, 12 wins; 1985, 6 wins; 1986, 4 wins; 1987, 3 wins
