= Porsche 934 =

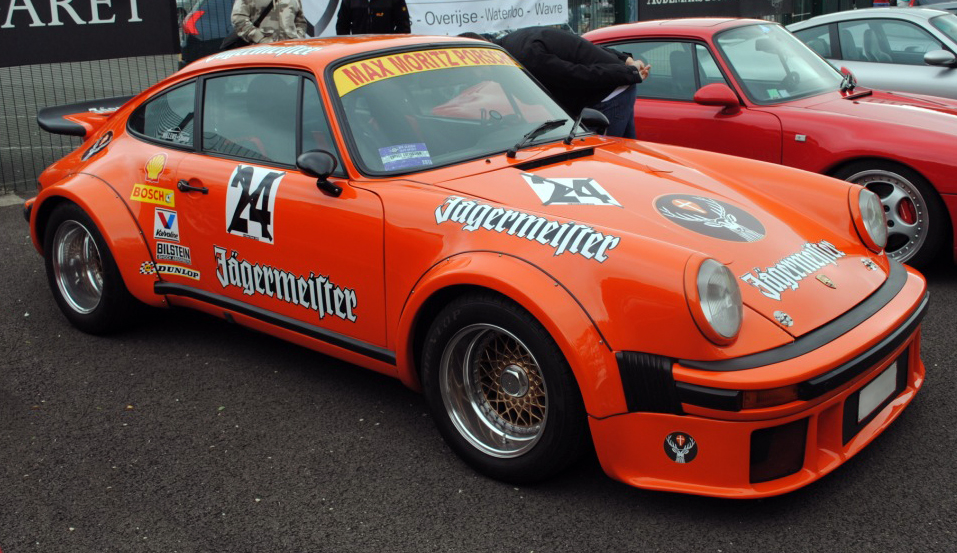

Overview
- Manufacturer: Porsche AG
- Production: 1976–1977
- Assembly: Germany: Stuttgart

Body and chassis
- Class: Group 4 racecar
- Body style: 2-door coupé
- Layout: RR layout
- Related: Porsche 911, 935, 930, Porsche 934/5

Chronology
- Predecessor: Porsche 911 Carrera RSR 3.0
- Successor: Porsche 924 Carrera GTR

The Porsche 934 also called Porsche 911 Turbo RSR (934) is a racing version of the Porsche 911 Turbo, prepared to FIA Group 4 rules, similar to the Porsche 935 which was prepared to FIA Group 5 rules.

== History ==
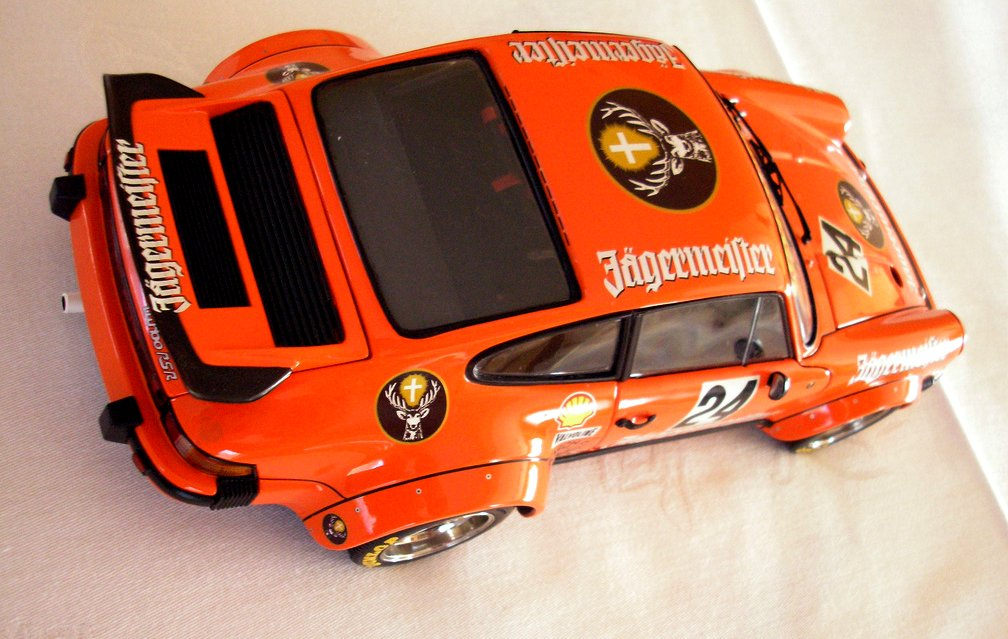
Porsche 934 "Jägermeister" rear view

The Porsche 911 Turbo RSR (934) was introduced for the 1976 racing season. It was manufactured for two years, 1976 and 1977, with 31 of them, total, being built. Toine Hezemans drove this car to victory at the European GT Championship, while in the U.S., with George Follmer at the wheel, it also became the Trans-Am champion. It continued to win races throughout the late 1970s.

The 934 was essential in building the Porsche 934/5, a combination of the 934 chassis and engine with the 935 wheels, tyres and rear wing configuration.

The 934 as well as the 935 were raced in the Deutsche Rennsport Meisterschaft in a distinctive orange "Jägermeister" livery.

Alan Hamilton the Australian Porsche distributor at the time owned one of these cars and competed and won the 1977 Australian Sports Car Championship, and in 1980 the same car won the title with Allan Moffat behind the wheel.

== Details ==
Porsche 934/5 at Goodwood Festival of Speed 2010

The 934 has a top speed approaching 190 mph (approximately 300 km/h) and has a zero to 60 mph (97 km/h) time of 3.9 seconds. It was one of the last designs to incorporate all the distinctive stylings of the original 911s, with only minor bodywork taken from the 911 Turbo, to include GRP (glass-reinforced plastic) wheelarch extensions, doors, engine lid and boot.

The car came in a regular trim, or a racing trim (also called "Group 4 trim"). Regular trim:

- 1,090 kg (2,403 lb)
- Electric windows and door trim
- 120 liter fuel tank, or 31.7 US gallons.
- 480 bhp (358 kW) 3-litre, flat-six engine (in 1977, modifications took it to 550 bhp)

The racing trim was a modified regular trim to meet with the FIA rules, most notably it added 30 kg (66 lb) of weight, so that it complied with the minimum weight requirement of Group 4.
