= Porsche 934/5 =

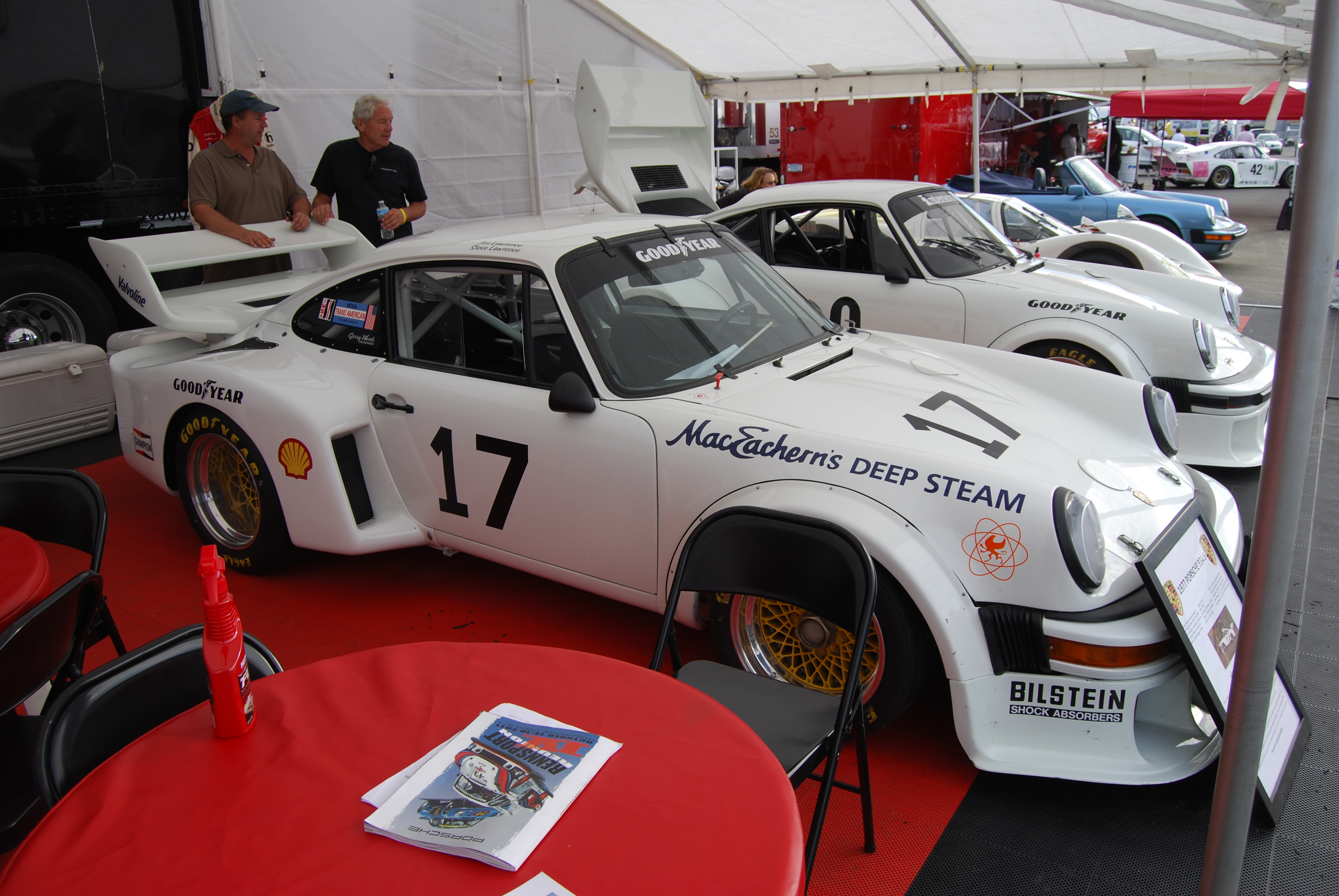

Overview
- Manufacturer: Porsche AG
- Production: 1977
- Assembly: Germany: Stuttgart

Body and chassis
- Class: Group 4 racecar
- Body style: 2-door coupé
- Layout: RR layout
- Related: Porsche 930, 934, 935

Powertrain
- Engine: Turbocharged 3.0L Flat-six
- Transmission: 4 speed manual gearbox

Dimensions
- Wheelbase: 2271mm x 1502mm x 1508mm
- Length: 4128 mm / 162.5 in
- Width: 1651 mm / 65.0 in
- Height: 1321 mm / 52.0 in
- Curb weight: 1984lbs (899,93kg)

The Porsche 934/5 is a racing car that was designed as a hybrid of the Porsche 934 and Porsche 935 to compete in Group 4 of the IMSA.

== History ==
The Porsche 934/5 was assembled from 10 samples of Porsche 934 and Porsche 935, by incorporating the Chassis and engine of the 934 with the wheels, tires and rear wing configuration of the 935, creating the new 934/5. The goal for the new design was to compete in the Group 4 racing competition of the IMSA (International Motor Sport Association) in 1977. On January 22, 1977, Peter Gregg and Brumos crew team flew to Germany, in order to acquire the resources necessary for this new car under construction to be assembled. Gregg and his team decided to fit the 934 with the 935's rear wing and to add a turbocharger, so that they could compete with the other racing cars, such as the more powerful DeKon Monzas. The name has been carefully selected and origins from the Porsche 911 Turbo (code-named 930). The "4" in the name comes from the fact that the 934/5 was built to compete in the Group 4 of the IMSA.

== Design ==
Porsche 934/5 at Goodwood Festival of Speed 2010

For the design of the Porsche 934/5, Porsche was strongly inspired by its previous models. The basis for design has been influenced by the Porsche 934. However, Peter Gregg and his team made the decision to fit the newly designed car with the large rear spoiler, the widened body work and the big fenders from the composition of the Porsche 935. The widened body work was required for the large rear wheels to fit. The result of the mixture between the 934 and 935 is a prototype-looking car, ready to dominate the racing tracks, which it was designed for.

== Motorsport ==
The Porsche 934/5 did not participate in many races, since the IMSA banned the 934/5 before it could compete in its first race. Due to this ban, the designers decided to enroll their machine in the rival SCAA Trans Am Series, in which the Porsche participated and won 6 out of the 8 races. These victories would mean that the 934/5 would be the 1977 champion, however, due to a formal protest against the 934/5 by Ludwig Heimrath, the officials declared Ludwig and his Porsche 934 champions of 1977.

== Specifications ==
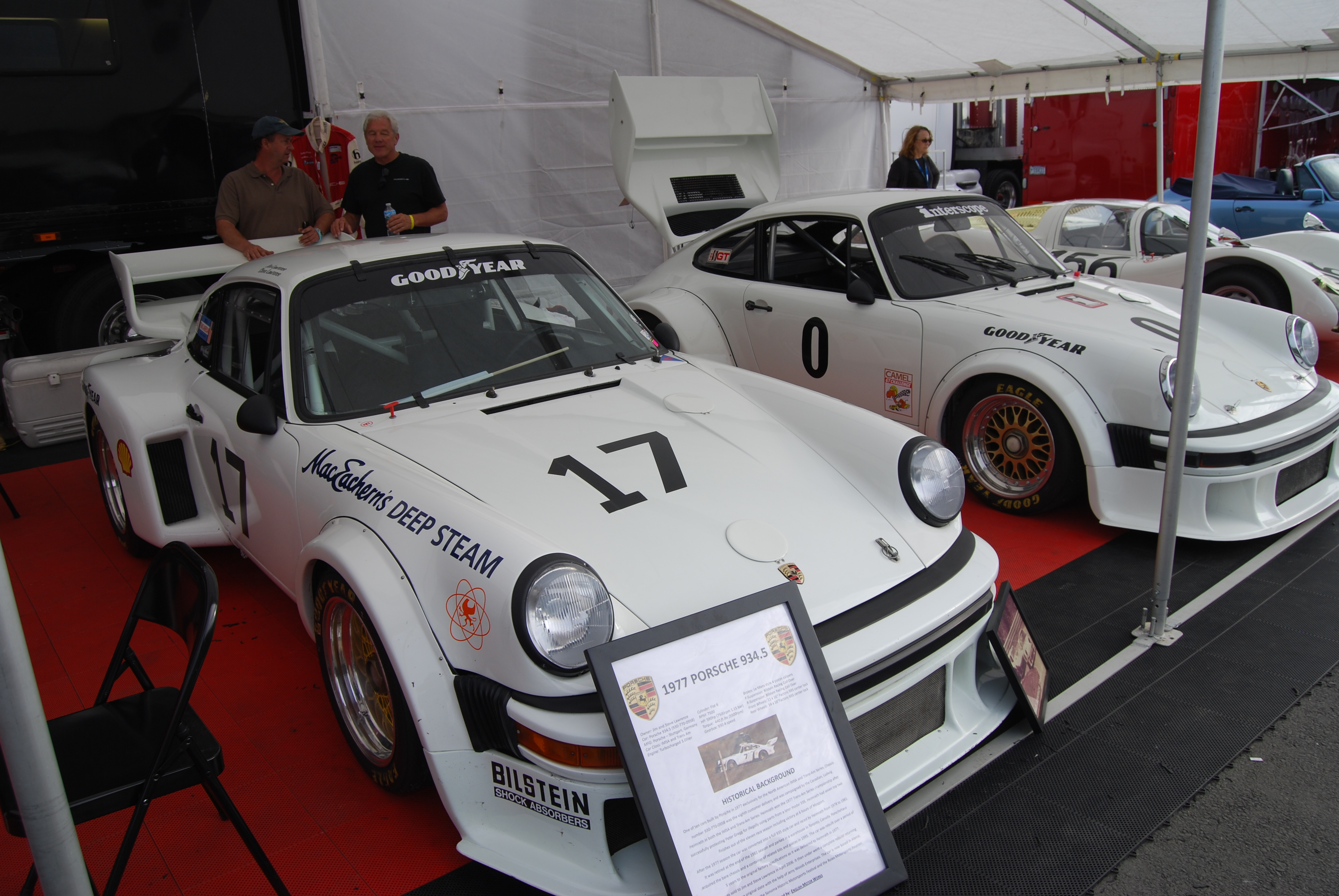
934/5

Engine	Flat-six engine
Position	Rear, Longitudinal
Aspiration	KKK Turbocharger
Valvetrain	SOHC
Fuel Feed	K-Jetronic Mechanical Injection
Displacement	2993cc / 182.64 in³
Compression	10.3:1
Power	361.7 kW / 485 bhp @ 7000 rpm
Specific Output	162.04 bhp per litre
Torque	588.4 Nm / 434 ft lbs @ 5400 rpm
Redline	8500
Body/Frame	Unit Steel with some fiberglass
Driven Wheels	Rear Engine / RWD
Wheel Type	BBS Center-Lock
Front Brakes	F 40.6 x 26.7 cm / 16 x 10.5 in
Rear Brakes	R 40.6 x 31.8 cm / 16 x 12.5 in
Steering	Rack and pinion
Wheel Base	2271 mm / 89.4 in
Front Track	1402 mm / 55.2 in
Rear Track	1422 mm / 56.0 in
Length	4128 mm / 162.5 in
Width	1651 mm / 65.0 in
Height	1321 mm / 52.0 in
Transmission	5-Speed Manual
Tran Clutch	Single Plate
Gear Ratios	3.18:1, 1.83:1, 1.26:1, 0.925:1, 0.724:1
Final Drive	4.43:1
Top Speed	~286.5 km/h / 178.0 mph
0 - 60 mph	~5.6 seconds
0 - 100 mph	~12.0 seconds
0 - 1/4 mile	~13.2 seconds
Fuel Capacity	120 litres or 31.68 gal.

– Source:

The creation of this car has been made possible by a change in rules. In the 1977, the IMSA had implemented a rule that allowed Porsche racers to add a single turbocharger to their cars, to increase their competitiveness versus the rival race cars which featured more horsepowers. As a result, a 3 Liter Flat-six engine (also referred as the boxer engine), fitted with a single KKK turbocharger, that could generate 590 bhp, and go 0 to 60 in 5.6 seconds was created for the 934/5 . The car also sported huge rear wheels, which made it a tough job to drive the car correctly, especially at high speeds.

== Auctions ==
Due to the fact that Porsche only built 10 of the 934/5, the price to pay in order to purchase one can vary. These prices are established at auctions. For the last known sales figures of the 934/5, the Gooding Amelia Auction has auctioned one of the ten models for $1,375,000.

== Other appearances ==
The Porsche 934/5 has its own Hot Wheels model, which is based on the classic colors in which the car raced in the 1970s.
