= 1977 6 Hours of Silverstone =

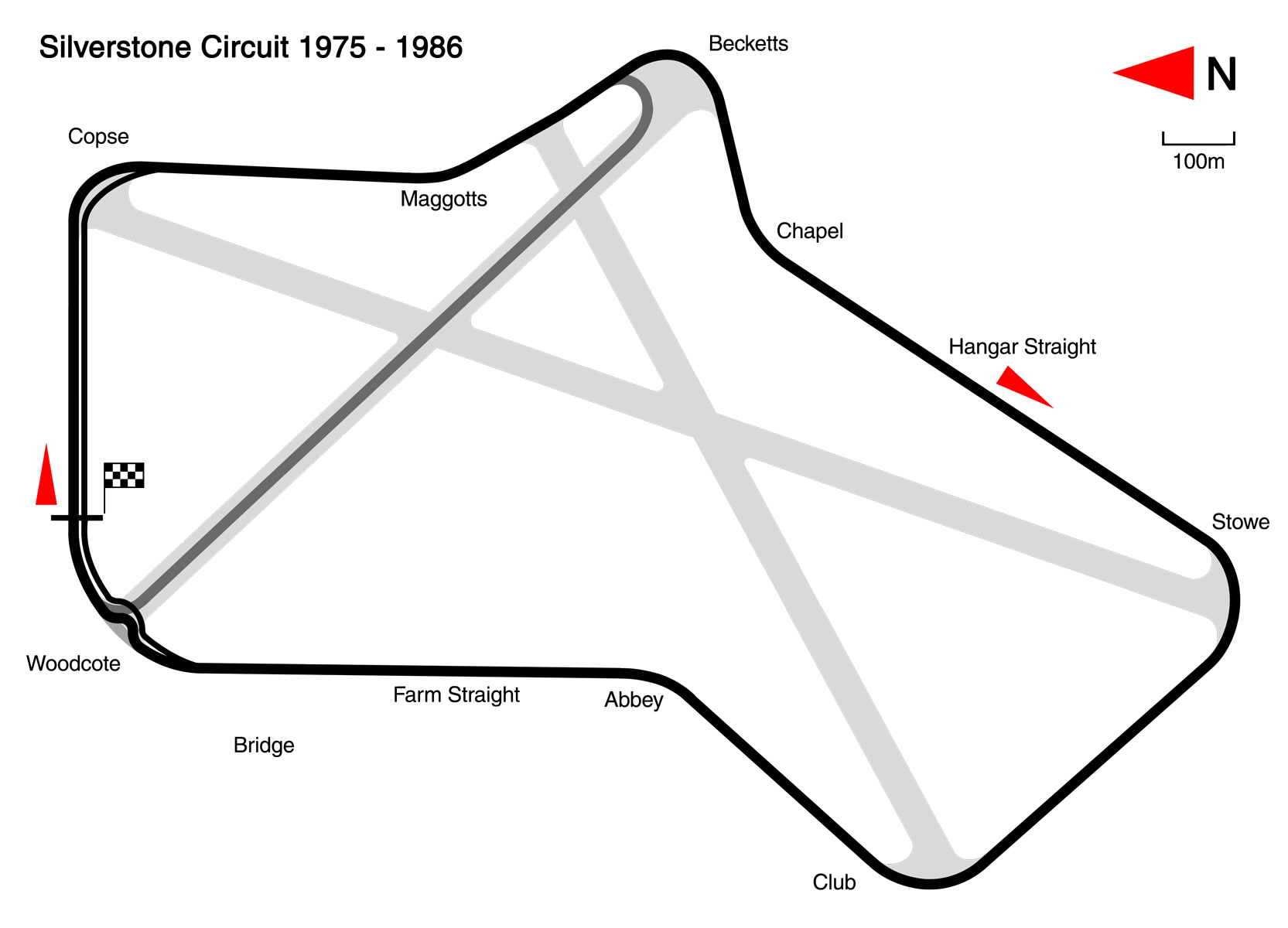
Map of the Silverstone Circuit (1975–1986)

The 1977 Six Hours of Silverstone, officially named the Kosset World Manufacturers 6 Hours, Silverstone, was the third race of the 1977 World Championship for Makes. It took place at the Silverstone Circuit, Great Britain on 15 May 1977. It was open to Group 5 Special Production cars, Group 4 GT cars, Group 3 GTs, Group 2 Touring Cars, and Group 1 Touring Production cars.

The race was won by Jochen Mass and Jacky Ickx driving a works Porsche 935/77; it was the first victory for the new 1977 variant of the 935. As with most races during this time, it was dominated by Porsche, with 13 of the 14 top finishers being Porsches. Fastest non-Porsche was the 2-litre BMW 320i driven by Swede Ronnie Peterson and German Helmut Kelleners, qualifying seventh and finishing in fourth.

== Report ==
The works, Martini-liveried Porsche was a new build; the first 935/77 had been deemed beyond repair after its crash at Mugello two months earlier. The new car was mostly identical, the only change on the twin-turbo, 650 PS (478 kW; 641 hp) 935 being minor modifications to the intercooler openings ahead of the front wheels. Taking pole and winning the race was sweet revenge for the previous year, when damaging the clutch in the start meant Ickx and Mass finished 51 laps down on the winning BMW. The only cars to challenge Porsche's dominance in Group 5 were the BMW 320i of Peterson/Kelleners, and the single, privateer Aston Martin V8. The Aston Martin was entered as a test session ahead of Le Mans 24 Hours, the car's main aspiration.

Fastest of the non-works Porsche 935s was the Kremer Racing car driven by Bob Wollek and John Fitzpatrick, in spite of their car having been severely damaged when it crashed with the Martini Porsche 935/77 at Mugello. Kremer had rebuilt the damaged chassis, which exhibited different handling characteristics in left- and right-hand turns as a result. Kremer simply installed rear wings which were different side-to-side to counteract this. Next fastest were the two cars entered by Georg Loos' Gelo Racing team, the first car driven by Stommelen and Hezemans and the second by Schenken and Bell. The Schenken/Bell car's engine broke down partway through qualifying and they borrowed a used one from the Facetti/Finotto 935 fielded by the Jolly Club team. The used engine blew up in spectacular fashion, however, after 61 laps. The last 935 to start was a new entry, in the form of a Kremer-tuned car entered by Kannacher and driven by Franz Konrad and Peter Hähnlein.

The only real Porsche competitor was the Peterson/Kelleners BMW 320i. This was not a works car, rather a Faltz-prepared machine built for Germany's G5 championship. Peterson set the seventh fastest qualifying time, behind the six Porsche 935s and ahead of a gaggle of 934s, even though he had to keep the engine below 9,000 rpm, well below the 9,800 redline. There were also numerous Ford Capri IIIs starting in the Series Production Touring (Group 1) category, as well as the one Aston Martin V8 fielded by Robin Hamilton with a minimum of factory support. The car was designed to race in GT (Group 4) and its bodywork was only minimally altered. After qualifying, however, it became apparent that the car needed a significantly larger rear wing to deal with high speed instability and the car thus had to be reclassified in Group 5. The V8 engine gave a "glorious Can-Am sound" and 520 bhp (388 kW) at 6,500 rpm, but being large and very heavy at 1.5 t (3,310 lb) it only managed to qualify in 15th position, out of 31 starters. No matter, this race was essentially a practice run for the upcoming 24 Hours of Le Mans. The Aston was painted red/white/blue, representing the Union Jack, in honour of Queen Elizabeth. The Jolly Club team, aside from the Porsche 935 starting in fifth, also fielded a Ford Escort Mk II RS 1800, fitted with a two-litre, Novamotor-tuned Cosworth BDA engine and starting in the Group 5 category. While qualifying 11th, much faster than several much more powerful Porsche 911 Carrera RSRs and the aforementioned Aston Martin, their race ended early with broken steering.

=== Race ===
One significant change over the previous year was that the cars were given a rolling start, behind the Rover 3500 pace car, which helped eliminate the risk of a repeat clutch failure for the Martini Porsche. Unlike the previous year, Mass was the starting driver, and he took the lead from the get go. The privateer entries remained in contact with Mass however, with Wollek and Stommelen battling for second - until Wollek had to make an unplanned pit stop for new tires on lap 32 and Stommelen briefly had a clear track. Stommelen then hit a hare, damaging the nose cowl and blocking a brake cooling duct, slowing him down in turn. While Mass was not much faster, these minor issues, coupled with less precise pit stops, allowed the factory team to begin building up a lead and also let Finotto/Fachetti move up to second place. The Kremer team also had a wheel gun damaged by a loose nut early on and had to change the nuts on this wheel manually for the remainder of the race. After a while, however, the Kremer and GeLo cars made their way back past the Jolly Club car, whle Peterson and Kelleners had climbed to fifth through a steady, uneventful run.

A little past the four-hour mark, the works car had to make a stop to change brake pads; these had been wearing out quicker than unexpected, likely a result of the finned wheel covers although these were designed to cool down the brakes. The stop took three-and-a-half minutes, enough to put the Kremer car into the lead. Mass then passed Wollek when the latter stopped for fuel, only to have this reversed when the Porsche had to refuel. Mass' pace then allowed him to pass on the track on the 203rd lap, holding on to this lead until the end. When there was a sudden heavy downpour near the end, Mass stayed out on slicks while everyone else pitted, putting up a series of fast laps in wet conditions. When the Porsche team eventually forced him in to change to rain tires, he had built up a three-lap lead.

Peterson/Kelleners made their way past the Jolly Club 935 to finish the race in fourth, after the Kremer and GeLo entries. The Aston Martin V8, meanwhile, ran until the end but was not classified, having finished only 115 laps because of an oil leak in the differential, caused by overheating. One team of brave amateurs, British motoring journalists Clive Richardson and Jeremy Walton, took part in a Samuri Conversions-prepped Datsun 240Z on a minimal budget (they did not have even spare tyres). The car was a five-year old example with more than 100,000 km (62,000 mi) on the clock, having been bought from a fish-and-chip shop owner not long before the race. The team was black flagged on three occasions for sloshing fuel across the track from a faulty breather, losing over half an hour (14-15 laps) in the pits. They went on with the race but were not classified in the end, having finished the race four laps shy of the cutoff, still on the same slicks they had been using since the start.

== Official Results ==
Position	Class	Nr.	Team	Driver	Car	Laps completed
1	Gr. 5	1	(Germany) Martini International Racing	(Germany) Jochen Mass (Belgium) Jacky Ickx	Porsche 935/77	231
2	Gr. 5	3	(Germany) Porsche Kremer Racing	(France) Bob Wollek (United Kingdom) John Fitzpatrick	Porsche 935	228
3	Gr. 5	6	(Germany) Gelo Racing	(Germany) Rolf Stommelen (Netherlands) Toine Hezemans	Porsche 935	223
4	Gr. 5	51	(Germany) Faltz	(Sweden) Ronnie Peterson (Germany) Helmut Kelleners	BMW 320i	216
5	Gr. 5	11	(Germany) Kannacher GT Racing	(Germany) Franz Konrad (Germany) Peter Hähnlein	Porsche 935	215
6	Gr. 5	8	(Italy) Jolly Club	(Italy) Carlo Facetti (Italy) Martino Finotto	Porsche 935	212
7	GT	9	(Italy) Jolly Club	(Italy) Vittorio Brambilla (Italy) Giampiero Moretti	Porsche 934	209
8	GT	10	(Switzerland) GVEA	(Switzerland) Claude Haldi (Germany) Reinhold Joest	Porsche 934	207
9	Gr. 5	31	(Sweden) Kenneth Leim	(Sweden) Kurt Simonsen (Sweden) Kenneth Leim	Porsche Carrera RSR	206
10	GT	33	(Germany) Hahn Sportwagen	(Germany) Klaus Utz (Germany) Armin Jahn	Porsche Carrera RSR	200
11	Gr. 5	35	(United Kingdom) Chandler Ibec Team Lloyds	(United Kingdom) Mike Franey (United Kingdom) Ian Bracey	Porsche Carrera RSR	196
12	Gr. 5	14	(Italy) Gabriele Gottifredi	(Italy) Girolamo Capra (Italy) Angelo Cogato (Italy) Gabriele Gottifredi	Porsche 934	195
13	GT	12	(France) ASA Cachia	(France) Claude Ballot-Léna (France) Jean-Louis Lafosse (France) Philippe Dagoreau	Porsche 934	195
14	GT (series)	36	(United Kingdom) Tony Wingrove	(United Kingdom) Pete Lovett (United Kingdom) Tony Wingrove	Porsche Carrera	191
15	T (series)	41	(United Kingdom) Gordon Spice	(United Kingdom) Gordon Spice (United Kingdom) Peter Clark	Ford Capri III	189
16	T (series)	42	(United Kingdom) Bob Gathercole	(United Kingdom) Win Percy (United Kingdom) Stuart Rolt	Ford Capri III	188
17	T (series)	43	(United Kingdom) Brian Robinson	(United Kingdom) Brian Robinson (United Kingdom) Les Blackburn	Ford Capri III	183
18	T (series)	39	(United Kingdom) Nu-Luxe Foam	(United Kingdom) John Myerscough (United Kingdom) Phil Dowsett (United Kingdom) Stuart Patterson	Ford Capri III	179
19	T (series)	40	(United Kingdom) Hammonds Sauce	(United Kingdom) Chris Craft (United Kingdom) Alain de Cadenet	Ford Capri III	175
Not classified
20	GT	47	(United Kingdom) Spike Anderson	(United Kingdom) Clive Richardson (United Kingdom) Jeremy Walton	Datsun 240Z	158
21	T (series)	49	(United Kingdom) Americana Jeans Monoposto	(United Kingdom) Gerry Marshall (United Kingdom) Tony Lanfranchi (United Kingdom) Barrie Williams	BMW 3.0 Si	157
22	Gr. 5	58	(United Kingdom) Janspeed Racing	(Republic of Ireland) Alec Poole (Netherlands) Han Tjan (United Kingdom) John Handley	Datsun Sunny	128
23	Gr. 5	22	(United Kingdom) Robin Hamilton	(United Kingdom) Robin Hamilton (United Kingdom) David Preece	Aston Martin AM V8	115
Retired
24	Gr. 5	5	(Germany) Gelo Racing Team	(Australia) Tim Schenken (United Kingdom) Derek Bell	Porsche 935	61 (engine)
25	GT	32	(United Kingdom) Mike Fisher	(United Kingdom) Brian Classic (United Kingdom) Mike Fisher (United Kingdom) Frank Sytner	Porsche Carrera	60 (clutch)
26	Gr. 5	54	(Italy) Jolly Club	(Italy) Umberto Grano (Germany) Siegfried Müller (Italy) Martino Finotto	Ford Escort RS1800	50 (steering)
27	T	55	(United Kingdom) Ken Coffey	(United Kingdom) Ken Coffey (United Kingdom) Cyd Williams (United Kingdom) Marc Smith	Ford Escort RS 2000	38 (piston)
28	Gr. 5	19	(United Kingdom) Stratstone	(United Kingdom) Tim Goss (United Kingdom) Mike Gidden (United Kingdom) Bob Neville	MGB GT V8	23 (engine)
Did not start
DNS	Gr. 5	15	(Italy) Marco Capoferri	(Italy) Marco Capoferri (Italy) Duilio Ghislotti	Porsche Carrera RSR Turbo	Clutch damaged during qualifying

=== Listed but did not compete ===
Teams, drivers, and cars which had entered the race but did not appear.

Class	Nr.	Team	Driver	Car
Gr. 5	16	(Austria) Memphis Team International	(Austria) Sepp Manhalter	BMW 3.5 CSL
T (series)	38	(Republic of Ireland) Tony Brennan	(Republic of Ireland) Tony Brennan (Republic of Ireland) Jody Carr	Ford Capri
T (series)	44	(United Kingdom) Esso GB	(United Kingdom) Vince Woodman (United Kingdom) Jonathan Buncombe	Ford Capri

=== Class victors ===
Class	Driver	Driver	Car	Overall classification
Gr. 5	(Germany) Jochen Mass	(Belgium) Jacky Ickx	Porsche 935/77	Winner overall
GT (Gr. 4)	(Italy) Vittorio Brambilla	(Italy) Giampiero Moretti	Porsche 934	7
GT (series, Gr. 3)	(United Kingdom) Pete Lovett	(United Kingdom) Tony Wingrove	Porsche Carrera	14
Touring (Gr. 2)	no finisher in Group			
Touring (series, Gr. 1)	(United Kingdom) Gordon Spice	(United Kingdom) Peter Clark	Ford Capri III	15
