= 1977 World Championship for Makes =

Racing tournament

1977 World Championship for Makes season

Seasons
- ← 1976 1978 →

The 1977 World Championship for Makes season featured the sixth FIA World Championship for Makes. This was a motor racing series for Group 5 Special Production Cars, Group 3 & 4 Grand Touring Cars and Group 1 & 2 Touring Cars which ran from 5 February to 23 October 1977 and comprised nine races.

== Schedule ==
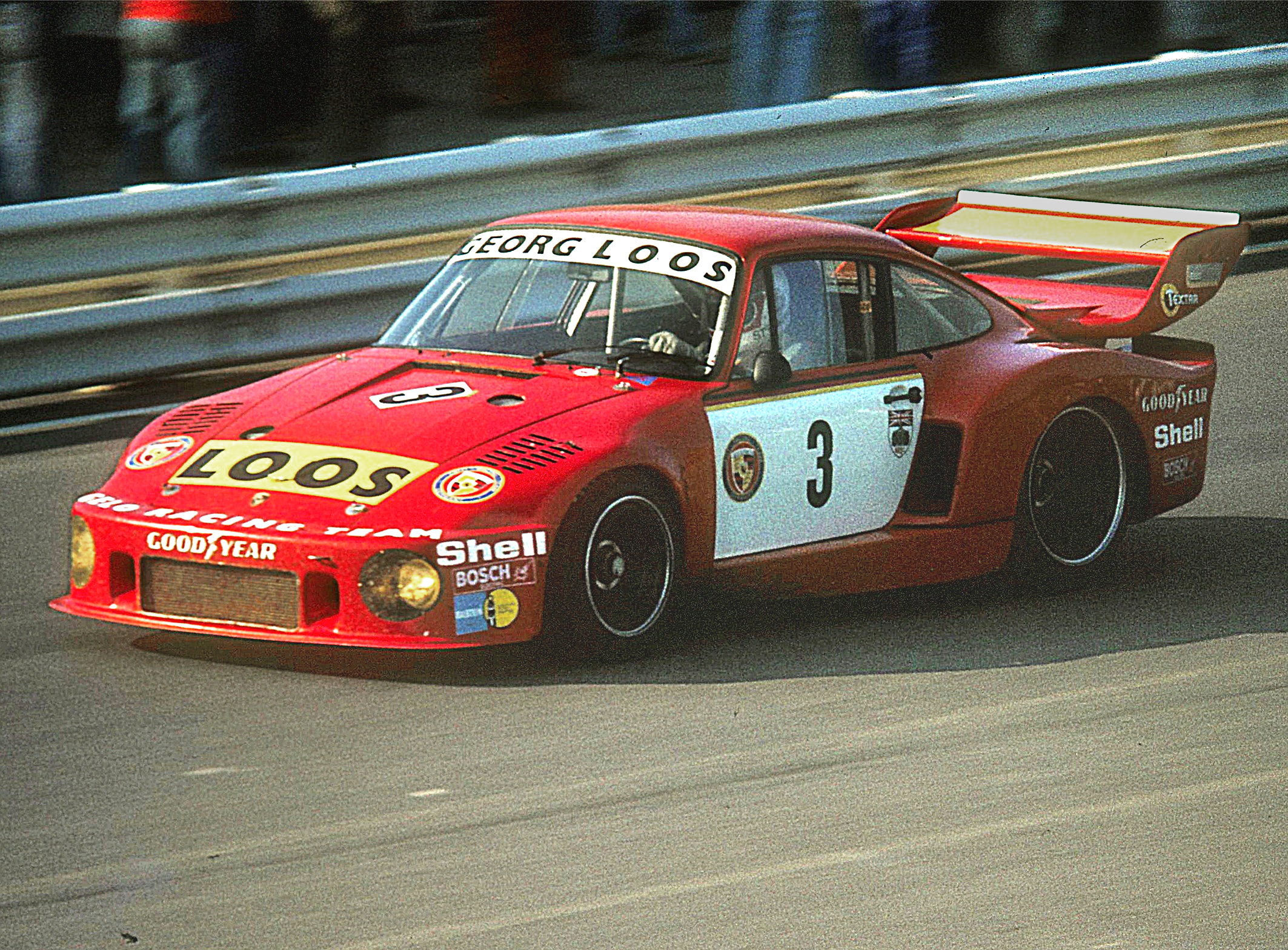
Private Loos-Porsche 935/77A at the Nürburgring round of the 1977 World Championship for Makes

Rnd	Race	Circuit	Date
1	(United States) 24 Hours of Daytona	Daytona International Speedway	5 February; 6 February
2	(Italy) 6 Hours of Mugello	Mugello Circuit	20 March
3	(United Kingdom) Kosset 6 Hours	Silverstone Circuit	15 May
4	(Germany) ADAC 1000km Nürburgring	Nürburgring	29 May
5	(United States) 6 Hours of Watkins Glen	Watkins Glen International	9 July
6	(Canada) 6 Hours of Mosport	Mosport Park	20 August
7	(United Kingdom) Rivet Supply 6 Hours	Brands Hatch	25 September
8	(Germany) Hessen Preis (6 Hours)	Hockenheimring	9 October
9	(Italy) 6 Hours of Vallelunga	Vallelunga Circuit	23 October

== Race results ==
Rnd	Circuit	Over 2.0 Winning Team	Under 2.0 Winning Team	Results
Rnd	Circuit	Over 2.0 Winning Drivers	Under 2.0 Winning Drivers	Results
1	Daytona	(United States) #43 Ecurie Escargot	None	Results
1	Daytona	(United States) Hurley Haywood (United States) Dave Helmick (United States) John Graves		Results
2	Mugello	(Germany) #2 Martini Racing	(Italy) #31 Mario Ruoso	Results
2	Mugello	(Germany) Rolf Stommelen (Liechtenstein) Manfred Schurti	(Italy) Mario Ruoso (Italy) "Pal Joe"	Results
3	Silverstone	(Germany) #1 Martini Racing	(Germany) #51 BMW Faltz	Results
3	Silverstone	(Germany) Jochen Mass (Belgium) Jacky Ickx	(Germany) Helmut Kelleners (Sweden) Ronnie Peterson	Results
4	Nürburgring	(Germany) #3 Gelo Racing	(Germany) #26 BMW Junior Team	Results
4	Nürburgring	(Germany) Rolf Stommelen (Netherlands) Toine Hezemans (Australia) Tim Schenken	(Germany) Manfred Winkelhock (Switzerland) Marc Surer	Results
5	Watkins Glen	(Germany) #1 Martini Racing	None	Results
5	Watkins Glen	(Germany) Jochen Mass (Belgium) Jacky Ickx		Results
6	Mosport	(Canada) #7 Heimrath Racing	(Germany) #23 BMW Faltz	Results
6	Mosport	(Canada) Ludwig Heimrath (United States) Paul Miller	(Canada) Gilles Villeneuve (United States) Eddie Cheever	Results
7	Brands Hatch	(Germany) #1 Martini Racing	(Germany) #33 BMW Faltz	Results
7	Brands Hatch	(Germany) Jochen Mass (Belgium) Jacky Ickx	(Germany) Manfred Winkelhock (United Kingdom) Tom Walkinshaw	Results
8	Hockenheimring	(Germany) #4 Porsche Kremer Racing	(Germany) #41 BMW Motorsport GmbH	Results
8	Hockenheimring	(France) Bob Wollek (United Kingdom) John Fitzpatrick	(United States) Eddie Cheever (Switzerland) Marc Surer	Results
9	Vallelunga	(Italy) #3 Scuderia Vesuvio	(Italy) #38 No Team Name	Results
9	Vallelunga	(Italy) Luigi Moreschi (Italy) "Dino"	(Italy) Gugliemo Manini (Italy) Roberto Curatolo	Results

== Points system ==
Points towards the World Championship for Makes were awarded for the first ten eligible finishers in each race in the order of 20-15-12-10-8-6-4-3-2-1. A make was only awarded points for its highest finishing eligible car and no points were awarded for placings gained by any other car of that make.

Only the best seven results counted towards the championship, with any other points earned not included in the total. Discarded points are shown within brackets.

Half points were awarded for Round 7 due to the race being stopped prior to half distance.

The same points system was applied to each of the three Divisional awards, with cars classified as follows:

- Division 1: Up to 2000cc
- Division 2: 2001 - 3000cc
- Division 3: 3001 - 6000cc

== Championships results ==
Position	Make	Day	Mug	Sil	Nur	Wat	Mos	Bra	Hoc	Val	Total
1	Porsche	20	20	20	20	20	20	(10)	20	(20)	140
2	BMW	-	-	10	12	-	20	1.5	12	-	55.5
3	De Tomaso	-	-	-	-	-	-	-	-	12	12
4	Ferrari	8	-	-	-	-	-	-	-	-	8
5	Fiat	-	-	-	-	-	-	-	-	3	3
	Lancia	-	3	-	-	-	-	-	-	-	3
7	Ford	-	2	-	-	-	-	-	-	-	2
	Division 1										
1	BMW	-	-	20	20	-	20	10	20	-	90
2	Ford	-	20	-	12	-	-	-	-	-	32
3	Fiat	-	-	-	-	-	-	-	-	20	20
4	Porsche	-	-	-	-	-	-	-	-	15	15
5	Lotus	-	-	-	-	-	-	7.5	-	-	7.5
6	Colt	-	-	-	-	-	-	6	-	-	6
7	Volkswagen	-	-	-	4	-	-	-	-	-	4
	Division 2										
1	Porsche	20	20	20	20	20	-	10	20	20	150
2	BMW	-	-	-	-	-	20	-	-	-	20
3	Lancia	-	12	-	-	-	-	-	-	-	12
4	Ford	-	-	8	1	-	-	-	-	-	9
5	Datsun	-	-	1	-	-	-	-	-	-	1
	Division 3										
1	Porsche	20	20	20	20	20	-	(10)	20	20	140
2	De Tomaso	-	-	-	-	-	-	1	-	12	13
3	Ferrari	12	-	-	-	-	-	-	-	-	12
4	MG	-	-	-	-	-	-	0.5	-	-	0.5

== The cars ==
The following models contributed to the nett point scores of their respective makes.

Outright

- Porsche 935
- BMW 320i
- De Tomaso Pantera
- Ferrari 365 GTB/4 Daytona
- Fiat X1/9
- Lancia Stratos
- Ford Escort

Division 1

- BMW 320i
- Ford Escort
- Fiat X1/9
- Porsche
- Lotus Elan
- Colt Lancer
- Volkswagen Golf

Division 2

- Porsche 911 Carrera
- BMW 320i
- Lancia Stratos
- Ford Capri
- Datsun 240Z

Division 3

- Porsche 935
- De Tomaso Pantera
- Ferrari 365 GTB/4 Daytona
- MGB GT V8

== World Championship for Sports Cars ==
For 1977, the FIA again organised two separate World Championships for “sports cars”, with Group 6 cars contesting the World Championship for Sports Cars and production-based cars competing in the World Championship for Makes. Events in which both types of car ran, such as the 12 Hours of Sebring or 24 Hours of Le Mans, were not counted towards either championship.

Following the 1977 season, the World Championship of Makes would become the sole international championship, while the World Championship for Sports Cars would be downgraded by the FIA to become the European Sportscar Championship. That series would only last the 1978 season before being dissolved.
