= Group 3 (motorsport) =

Auto racing classification

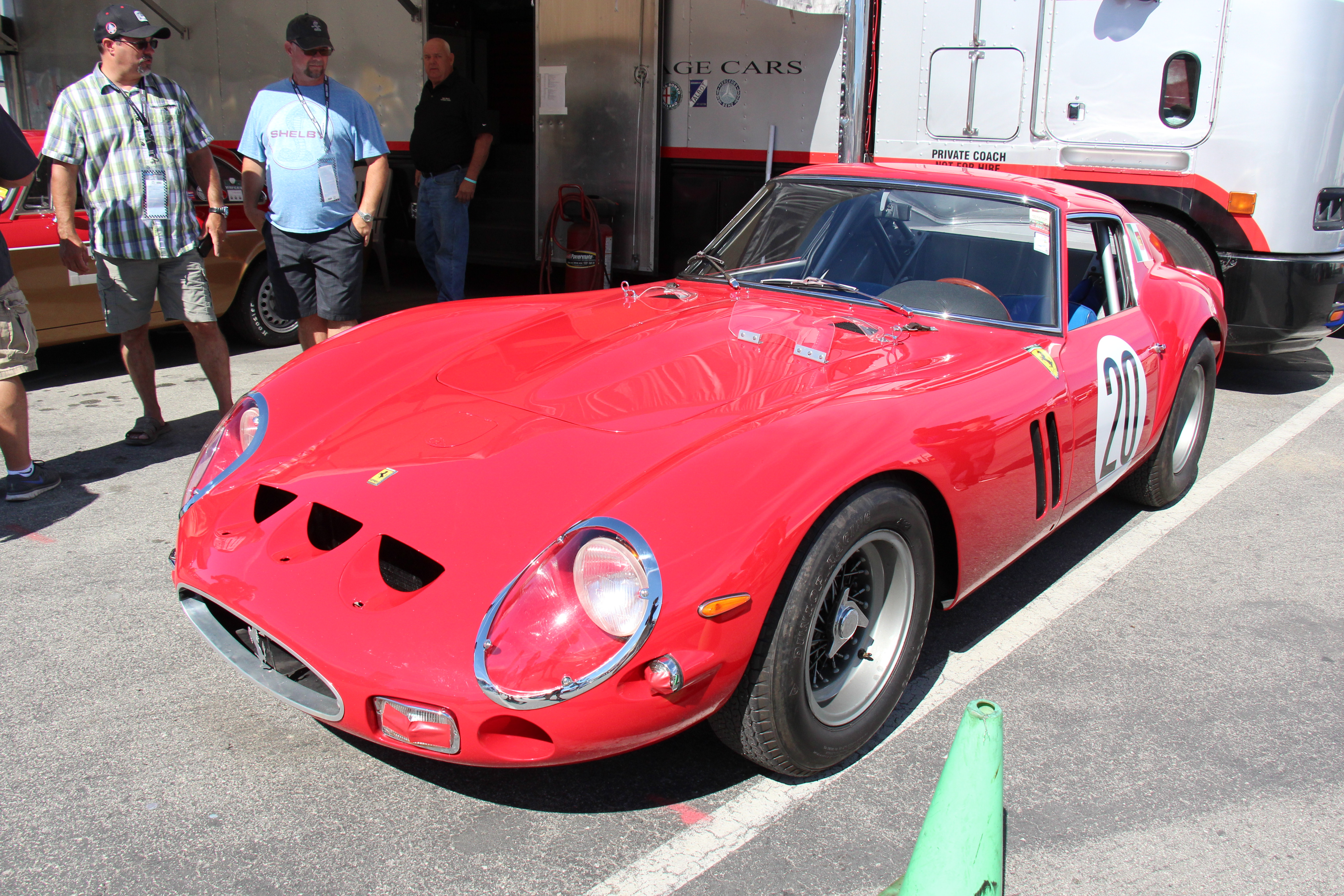
Ferrari 250 GTO Berlinetta; built to FIA Group 3 regulations

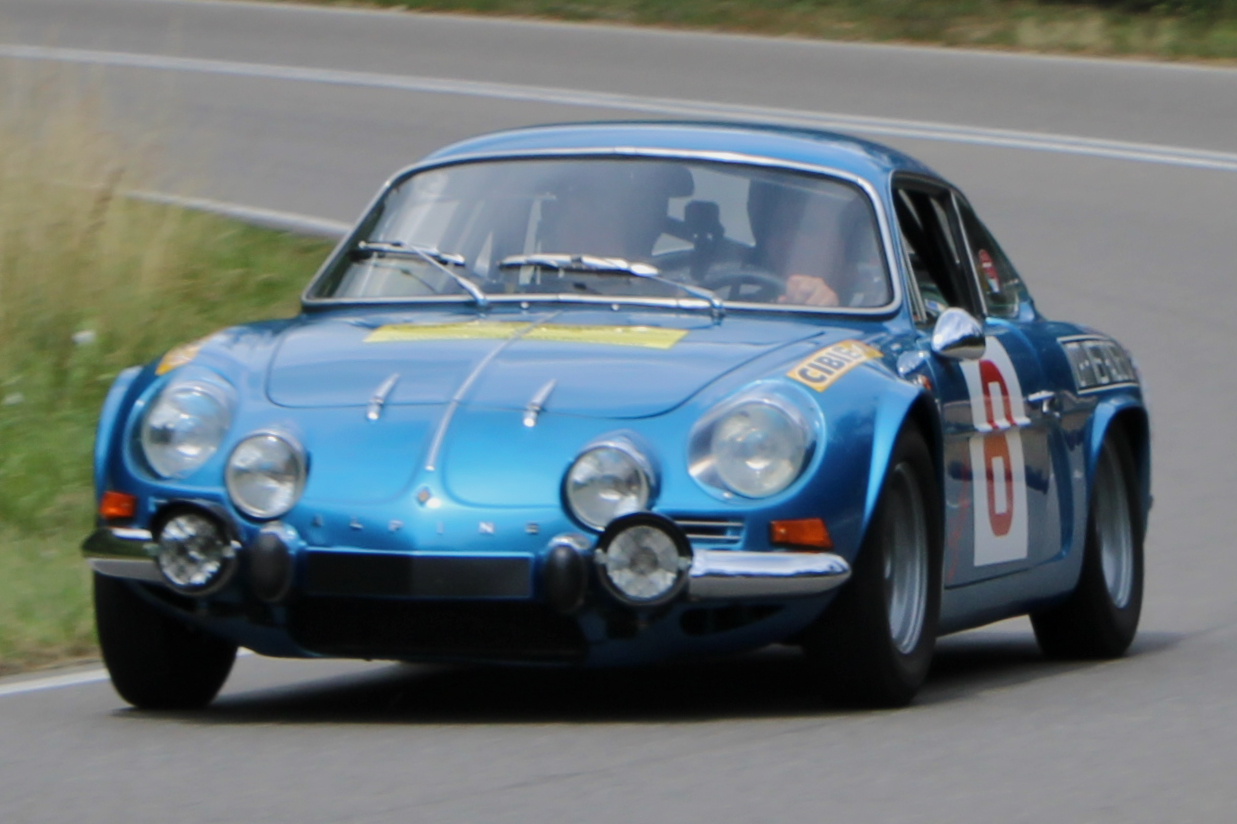
An Alpine-Renault A110 1300 Gordini rally car, built to Group 3 specifications (1968)

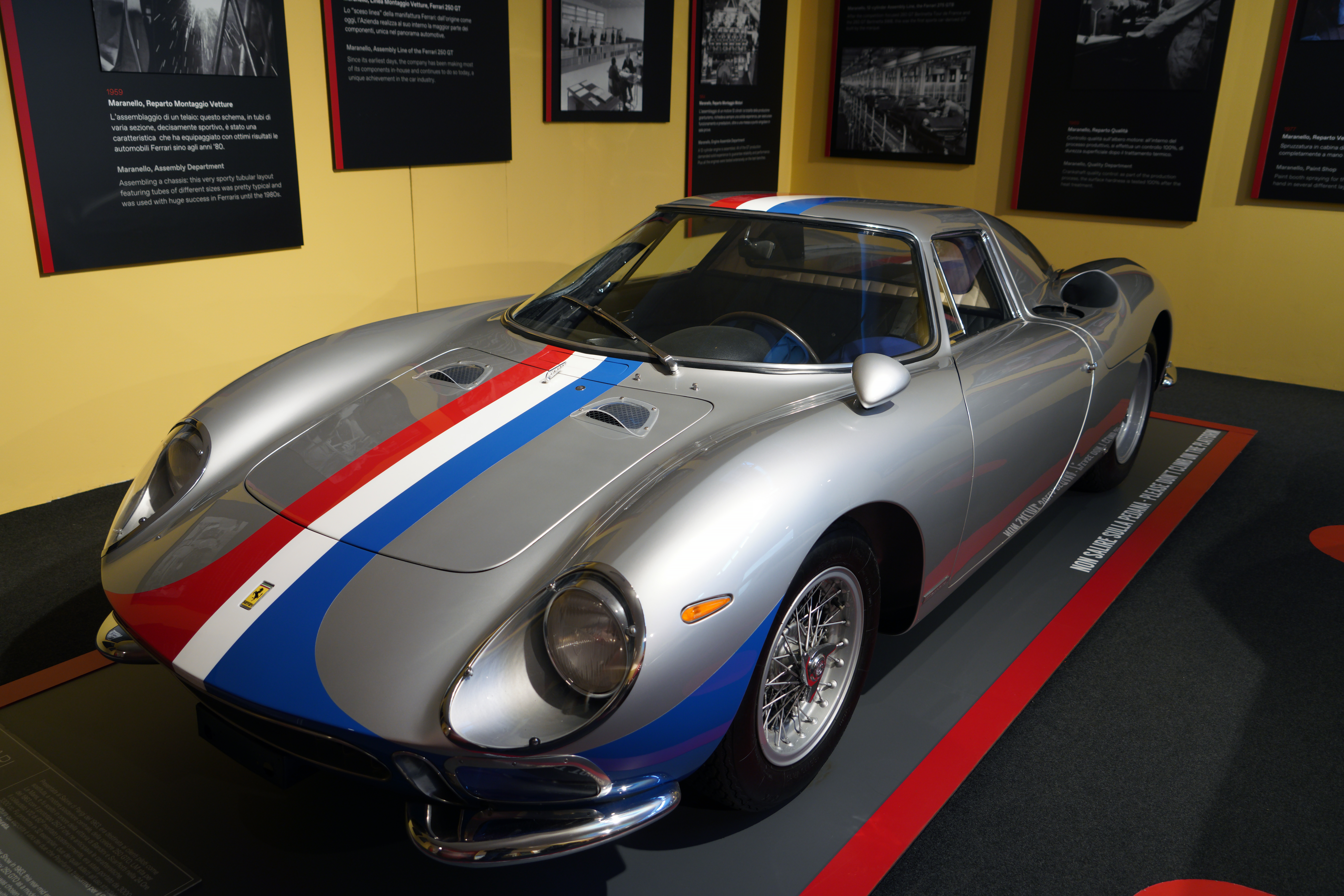
A Ferrari 250 LM sports car, built to Group 3 specifications (1963), but not homologated as such. As a prototype it won the 1965 24 Hours of Le Mans, then got homologated in 1966 as Group 4

The Group 3 racing class referred to a set of regulations for Grand Touring Cars competing in sportscar racing and rallying events regulated by the FIA. These regulations were active, in various forms, from 1957 to 1981.

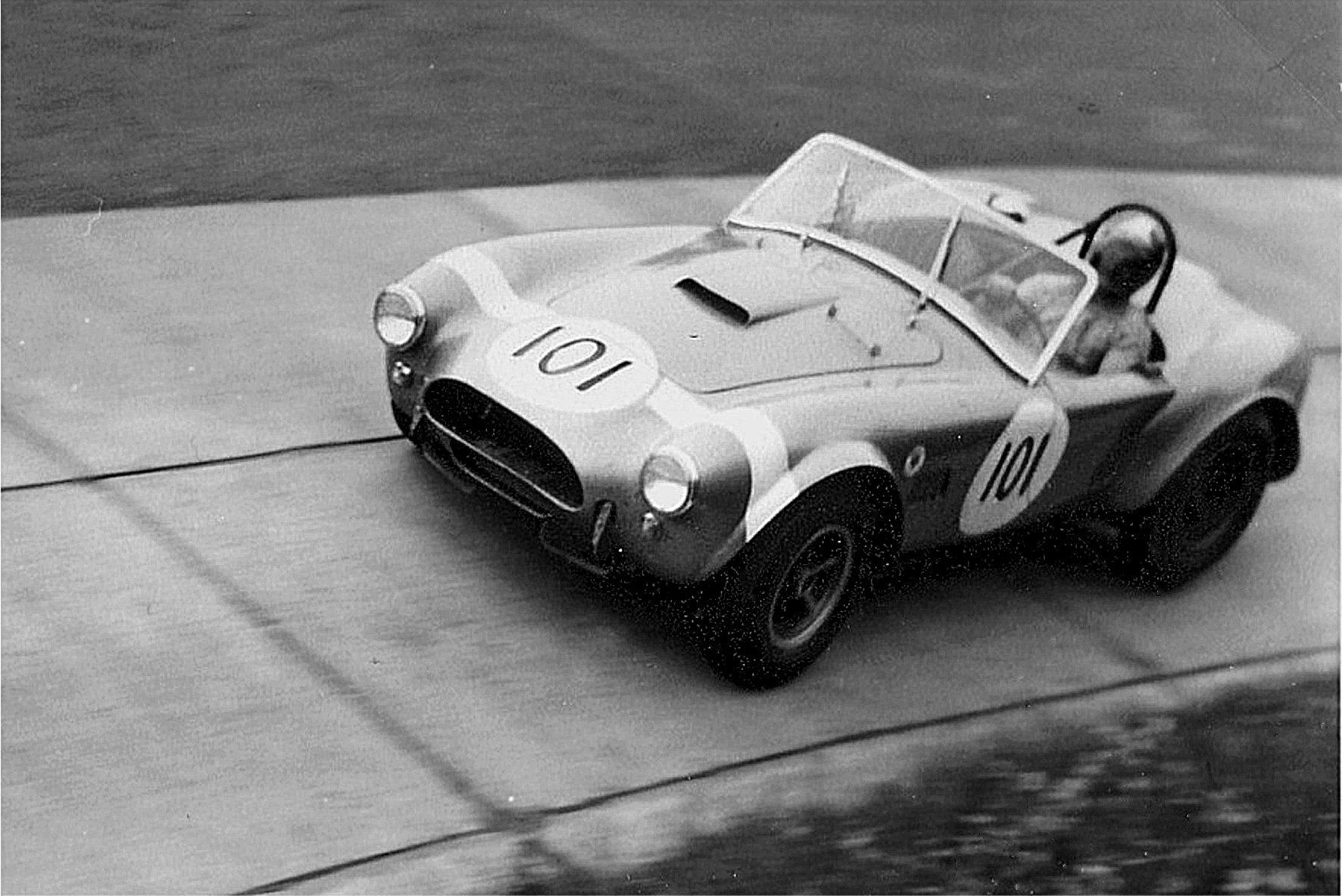
Shelby Cobra, competing at the Nürburgring Nordschleife in 1964, was built to Group 3 GT specifications

== 1957 to 1965 ==
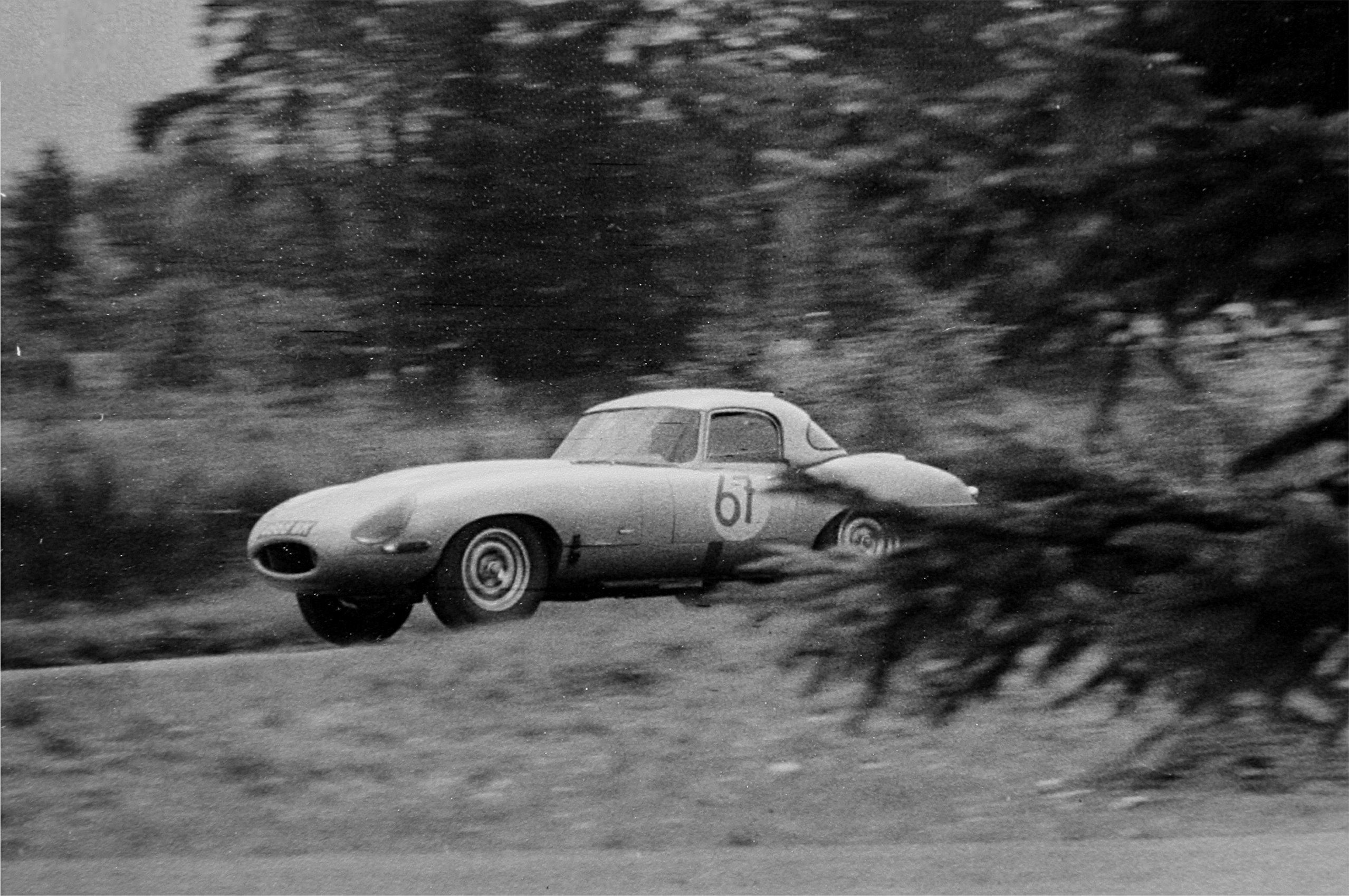
A Group 3 Jaguar E-type competing in the 1963 Nürburgring 1000km.

Regulations for Grand Touring Car racing were first defined when the FIA issued "Appendix J" for Touring Cars and GT Cars in 1954. The term Group 3 was in use by 1957 and by 1960 a minimum production of 100 units in 12 consecutive months was required to allow homologation into Group 3. An FIA GT Cup was instituted in 1960 and the GT category was featuring prominently in most rounds of the World Sports Car Championship. For 1962 the FIA replaced the World Sports Car Championship with an International Championship for GT Manufacturers, the new title being awarded each year through to 1965.

== 1966 to 1969 ==
The FIA introduced a new Group 3 Grand Touring Car category in 1966 as part of a major revision of the Appendix J regulations. The production minimum required for Group 3 homologation was raised to 500 units and models such as the Ferrari 250 GTO and Porsche 904 were reclassified to the new Group 4 Sports Car category with its lower 50 unit minimum. The International Championship for GT Manufacturers was discontinued for 1966 and replaced by the International Championship for Sports Cars. GT cars were eligible to compete with the Group 4 cars in rounds of the International Championship for Sports Cars in 1966 and 1967 and then in the new International Championship for Makes with Group 4 Sports Cars and Group 6 Prototype-Sports Cars in 1968 and 1969. An International Cup for GT Cars was contested concurrently with the Makes Championship from 1968.

== 1970 to 1981 ==
The creation of a new Group 4 Special Grand Touring Car category in 1970 saw Group 3 renamed as Series Production Grand Touring Cars and the minimum production requirement increased to 1000 units. Group 4, which allowed a greater degree of modification to the competing vehicles, had its minimum production requirement set at 500 units. Both GT categories were eligible to compete in the International Championship for Makes and then, from 1972, in the renamed World Championship of Makes. The International Cup for GT Cars also continued. In 1976 the World Championship of Makes was restricted to production derived cars (FIA Groups 1 to 5) and the International Cup for GT Cars was discontinued in that year.

The Group 3 Series Production Grand Touring Car category remained valid through to 1981 with the FIA introducing a new Group B Grand Touring car category the following year.

== Rallying ==
In rallying, there were classes for Group 1, Group 2, Group 3 and Group 4 cars. The Lancia Beta Coupé, was homologated into both Group 3 and Group 4, with the Group 3 car running the mass-produced 8-valve engine, and the Group 4 version running the more powerful 16-valve.

== Groups 1-9 ==
Categories and Groups of Appendix J 1954 - 1965
Categories	1954	1955	1956	1957	1958	1959	1960	1961	1962	1963	1964	1965
Categories	I. Touring						A. Touring					
Categories	II. Sports				II. Grand Touring		B. Grand Touring					
Categories	-						C. Sports					
Group	1954	1955	1956	1957	1958	1959	1960	1961	1962	1963	1964	1965
Group 1	Normal series production											
Group 2	"Grand Touring" series prod				Modified series prod		Modified series prod					
Group 3	Special series production						Grand Touring Cars					
Group 4	Series production				Normal GT series prod		Sports Car					
Group 5	International				Modified GT series prod		-					
Group 6	-				GT specials		-					

Categories and Groups of Appendix J 1966 - 1981 (Production requirement)
Categories	1966	1967	1968	1969	1970	1971	1972	1973	1974	1975	1976	1977	1978	1979	1980	1981
Categories	A. Production															
Categories	B. Special				B. Experimental Competition						B. Racing Cars					
Categories	C. Racing Cars										-					
Group	1966	1967	1968	1969	1970	1971	1972	1973	1974	1975	1976	1977	1978	1979	1980	1981
Group 1	Series Touring (5000)															
Group 2	Touring (1000)				Special Touring (1000)											
Group 3	Grand Touring (500)				Series Grand Touring (1000)											
Group 4	Sportscars (50/25)				Special Grand Touring (500)						Grand Touring (400)					
Group 5	Special Touring Cars				Sports cars (25)		Sports cars				Special cars derived from Groups 1-4					
Group 6	Prototype sportscars						-				Two-seater racecars					
Group 7	Two-seater racecars										International formula					
Group 8	Formula racing cars						International formula				Formula libre racing cars					
Group 9	Formula libre racing cars										-					
Source: Note: Special may be replaced with Competition in some official documents.

== See also ==
- World Rally Championship
- World Sportscar Championship
