= Group 2 (motorsport) =

FIA car classification, pre-1982

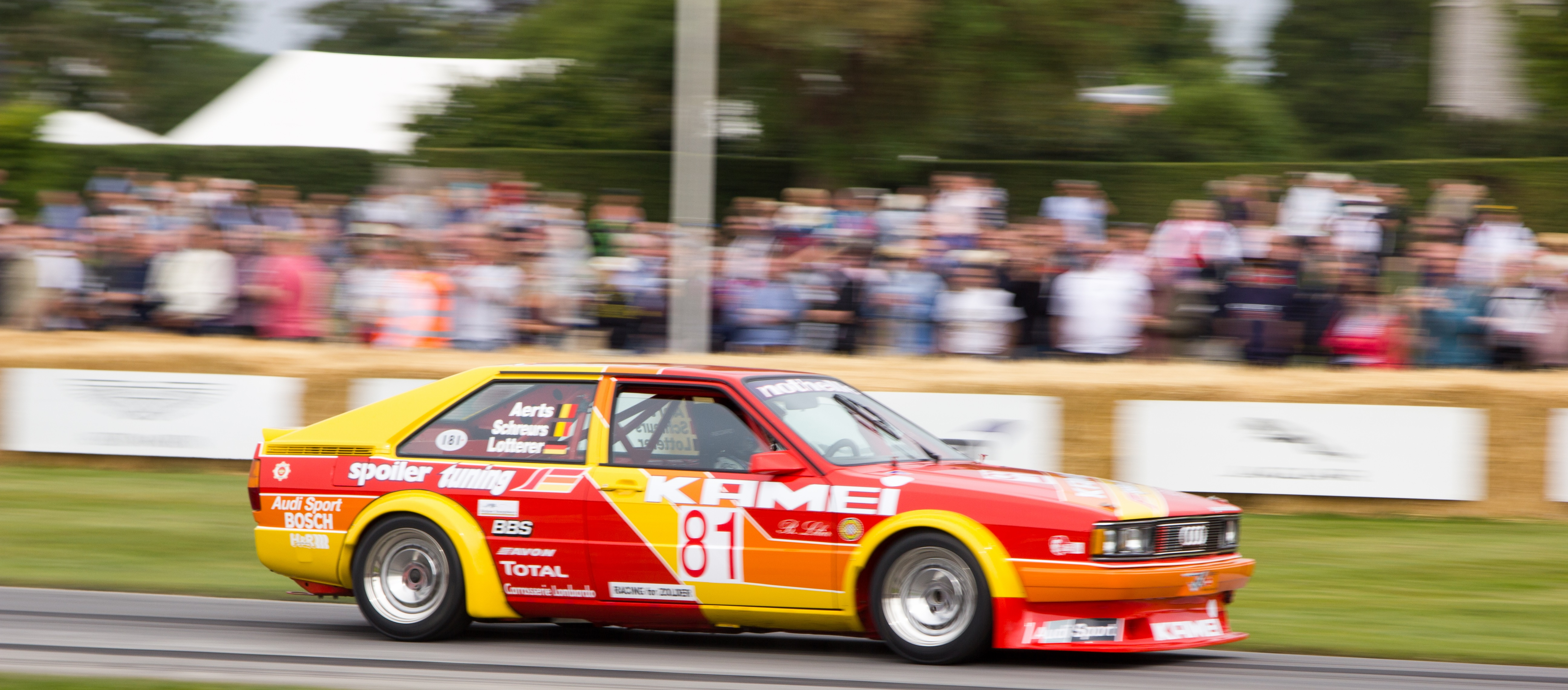
An Audi Coupe (B2) Group 2 Touring Car

The Group 2 racing class referred to regulations for cars in touring car racing and rallying, as regulated by the FIA. Group 2 was replaced by Group A in 1982.

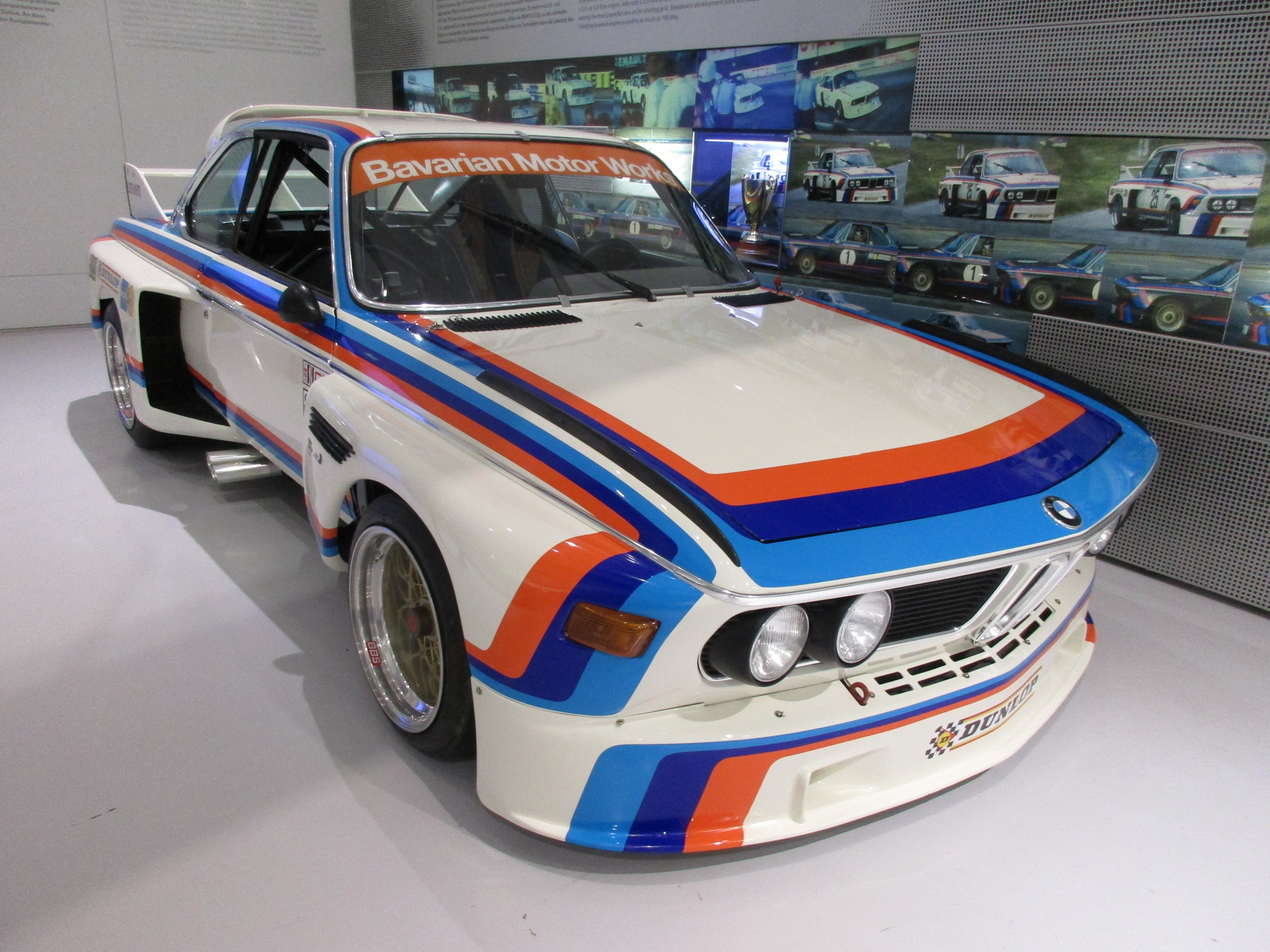
A BMW 3.0 CSL Group 2 Touring Car

The FIA established Appendix J regulations for Touring and GT cars for 1954 and the term Group 2 was in use to define Touring Cars in the Appendix J of 1959. By 1961 Appendix J included specifications for both Group 1 Series Touring Cars and Group 2 Improved Touring Cars with a minimum production of 1,000 units in twelve consecutive months required to allow homologation of a model into either group. Technical modifications beyond those allowed for Group 1 cars were permitted in Group 2.

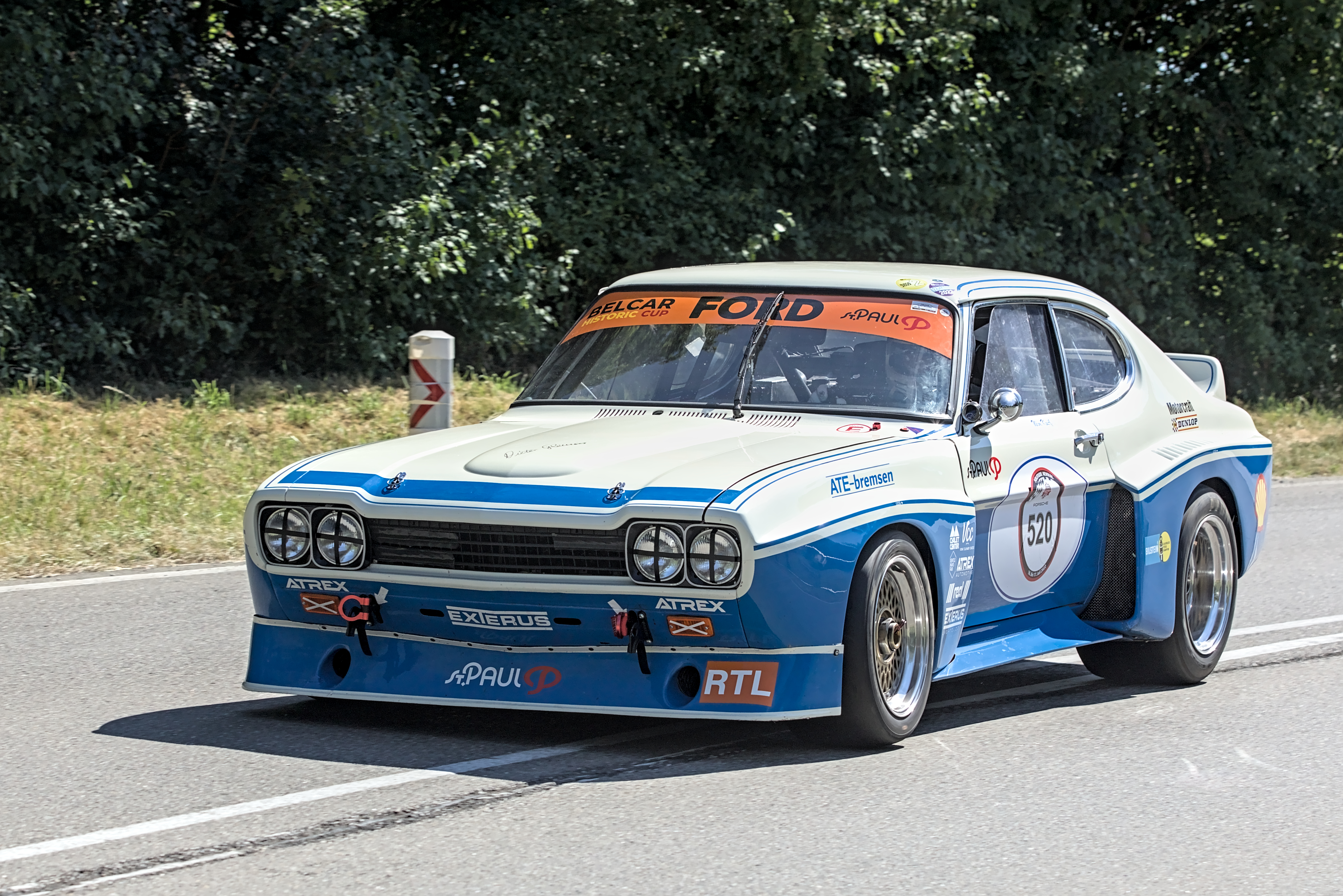
A Ford Capri 3100 RS Group 2 Touring Car

The British Saloon Car Championship was open to Group 2 cars each year from 1961 to 1965 and from 1970 to 1973.

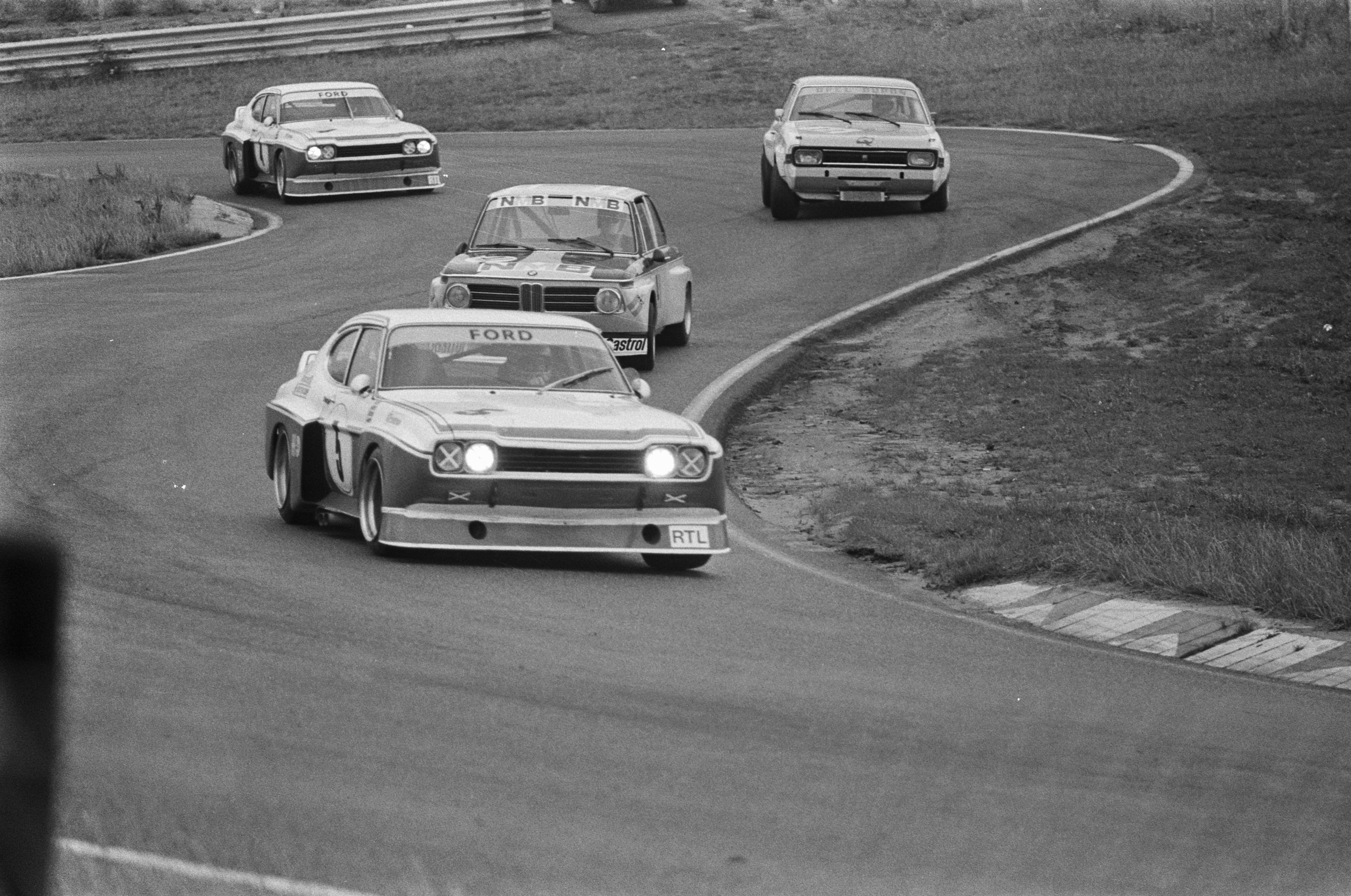
Group 2 Touring Cars competing at a race at Zandvoort, in 1974

Group 2 was the specified category for the European Touring Car Challenge from 1963 to 1967 and the cars were also eligible alongside Group 5 special touring cars in 1968 and 1969. It was again the premier category when the series was renamed as the European Touring Car Championship for 1970 and continued to be so until it was replaced by Group A for 1982.

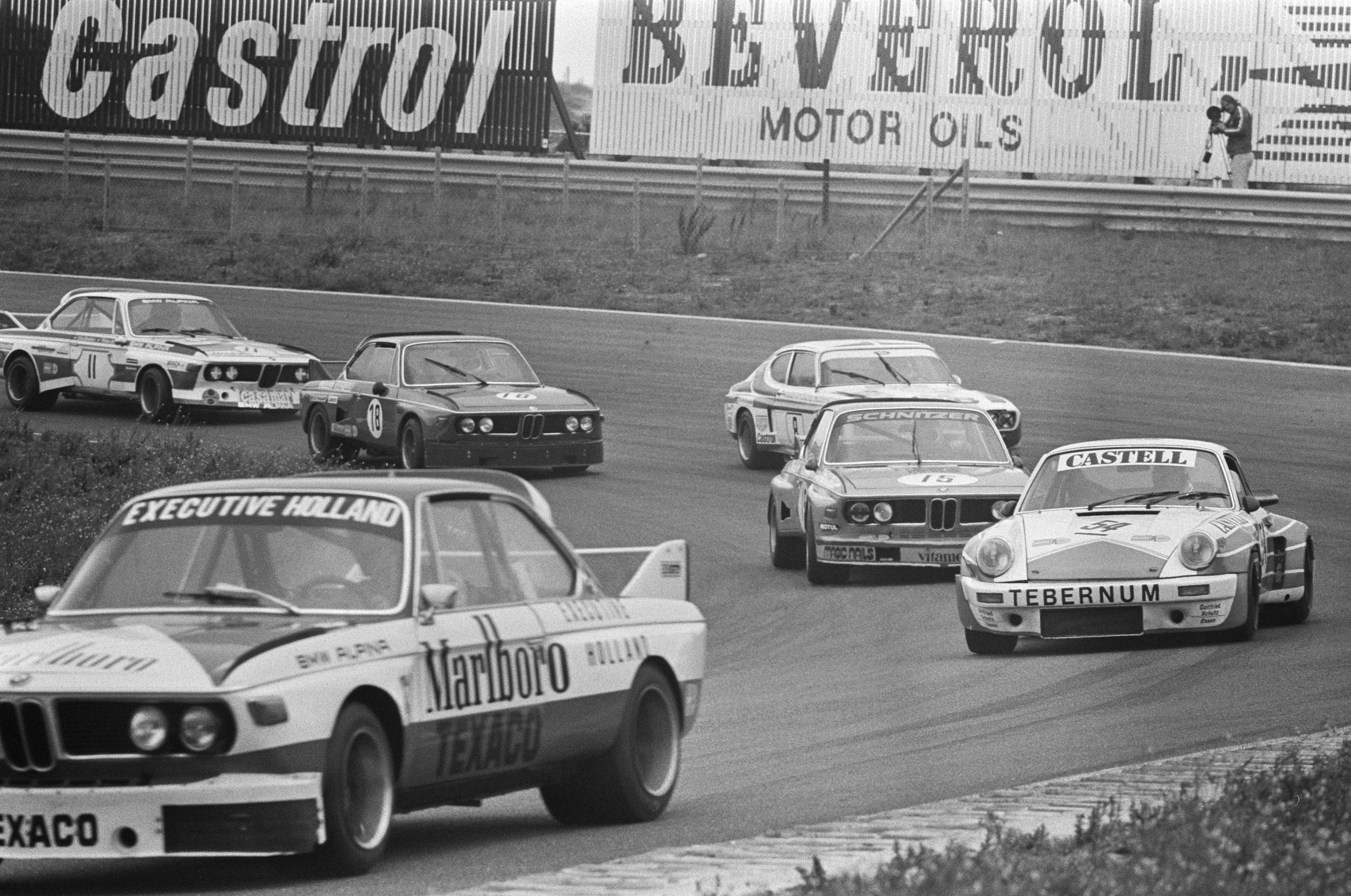
Group 2 Touring Car race, at Zandvoort, in 1974

The Sports Car Club of America’s Trans-American Sedan Championship was contested by Group 2 touring cars from its inception in 1966 through to the 1972 season.

== List of Group 2 Cars ==
Brand	Chassis	Image	Debut	Applications
Alfa Romeo	Alfetta GT		1975	Rally
Alfa Romeo	GTA		1966	Touring Car
Alfa Romeo	GTV		1971	Rally
AMC	Javelin		1968	Touring Car
Audi	Coupe (B2)		1981	Touring Car
BMC	Mini Cooper S		1960	Rally
BMC	Mini Cooper S		1961	Touring Car
BMW	1800TI & 1800 TISA		1966	Touring Car
BMW	2002 Turbo			
BMW	2002Ti		1969	Touring Car
BMW	2002Ti			Rally
BMW	3.0 CSL		1973	Touring Car
BMW	635 CSi			Touring Car
Chevrolet	Camaro		1967	Touring Car
Chevrolet	Corvair		1966	Touring Car
Daihatsu	Charade		1979	Rally
Datsun	1600 SSS		1970	Rally
Datsun	510		1971	Touring Car
Dodge	Charger Hemi			
Dodge	Dart		1966	Touring Car
Dodge	Ramcharger			
Fiat-Abarth	850 TC		1961	
Fiat-Abarth	1000 TC		1966	Touring Car
Ford	Capri RS		1971	Touring Car
Ford	Cortina Lotus		1963	Touring Car
Ford	Cortina Lotus		1963	Rally
Ford	Mustang		1966	Touring Car
Ford	Escort 1850 GT		1970	Rally
Ford	Escort Twin Cam		1969	Rally
FSO	Polonez 2000 Rally Group II		1980	Rally
Lada	1600 MTX			Rally
Mercury	Cougar		1967	Touring Car
Mitsubishi	Celeste			
Opel	Commodore			Rally
Plymouth	Barracuda		1966	Touring Car
Pontiac	Firebird		1969	Touring Car
Porsche	911		1967	Touring Car
Trabant	P 50			
Triumph	2000			
Volkswagen	Super Beetle		1972	
Volvo	122S		1966	Touring Car
Volvo	142			Touring Car

== Groups 1-9 ==
Categories and Groups of Appendix J 1954 - 1965
Categories	1954	1955	1956	1957	1958	1959	1960	1961	1962	1963	1964	1965
Categories	I. Touring						A. Touring					
Categories	II. Sports				II. Grand Touring		B. Grand Touring					
Categories	-						C. Sports					
Group	1954	1955	1956	1957	1958	1959	1960	1961	1962	1963	1964	1965
Group 1	Normal series production											
Group 2	"Grand Touring" series prod				Modified series prod		Modified series prod					
Group 3	Special series production						Grand Touring Cars					
Group 4	Series production				Normal GT series prod		Sports Car					
Group 5	International				Modified GT series prod		-					
Group 6	-				GT specials		-					

Categories and Groups of Appendix J 1966 - 1981 (Production requirement)
Categories	1966	1967	1968	1969	1970	1971	1972	1973	1974	1975	1976	1977	1978	1979	1980	1981
Categories	A. Production															
Categories	B. Special				B. Experimental Competition						B. Racing Cars					
Categories	C. Racing Cars										-					
Group	1966	1967	1968	1969	1970	1971	1972	1973	1974	1975	1976	1977	1978	1979	1980	1981
Group 1	Series Touring (5000)															
Group 2	Touring (1000)				Special Touring (1000)											
Group 3	Grand Touring (500)				Series Grand Touring (1000)											
Group 4	Sportscars (50/25)				Special Grand Touring (500)						Grand Touring (400)					
Group 5	Special Touring Cars				Sports cars (25)		Sports cars				Special cars derived from Groups 1-4					
Group 6	Prototype sportscars						-				Two-seater racecars					
Group 7	Two-seater racecars										International formula					
Group 8	Formula racing cars						International formula				Formula libre racing cars					
Group 9	Formula libre racing cars										-					
Source: Note: Special may be replaced with Competition in some official documents.
