= Group 1 (motorsport) =

FIA racing car classification for series-production touring cars

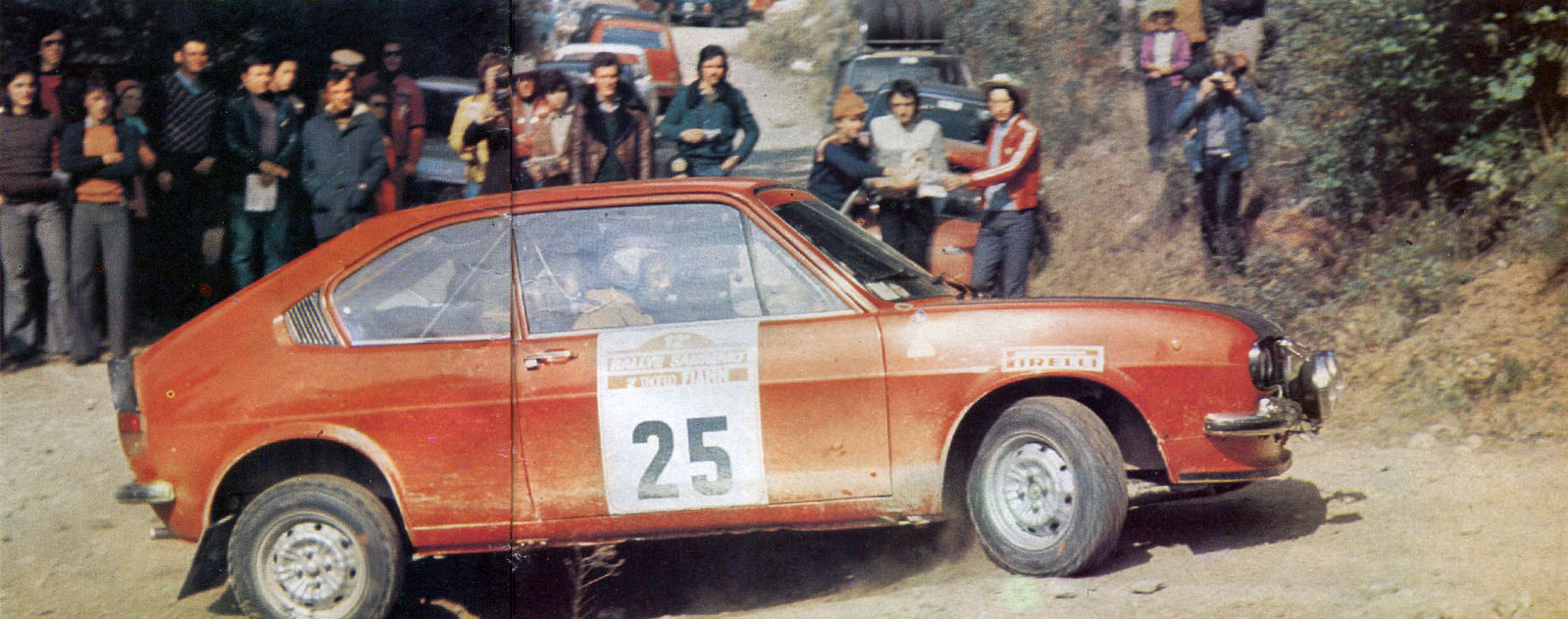
The Alfasud TI Group 1 of Alfa Romeo at the 1974 Rallye Sanremo

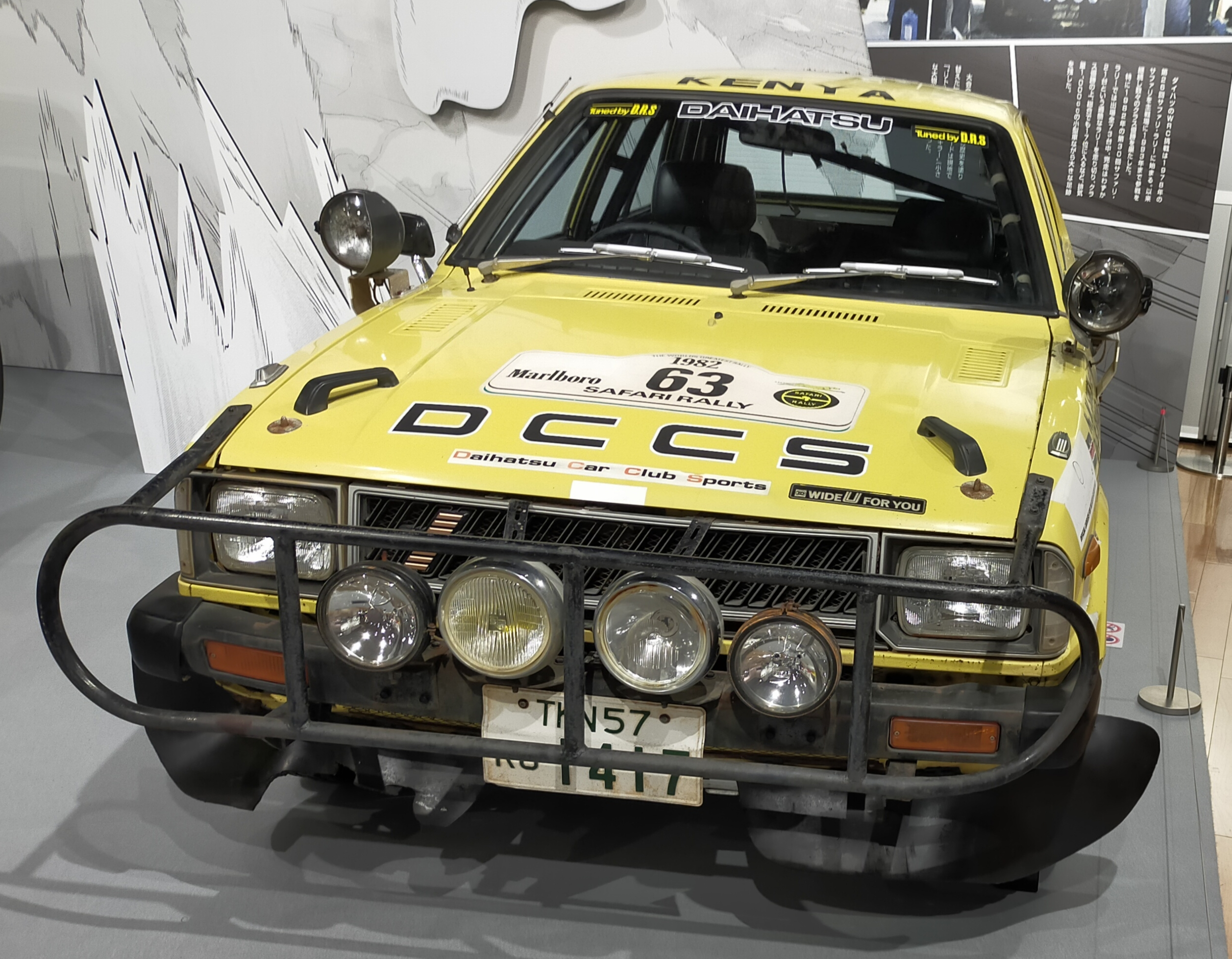
Daihatsu Charade Safari Rally Group 1 (1982)

In international motorsport, Group 1 referred to FIA regulations for cars in touring car racing and rallying. Throughout its existence the group retained a definition of being standard, series production touring cars, and of having a character of being unmodified or not specifically prepared for racing. The class was introduced in the then new Appendix J of the International Sporting Code in 1954 and was replaced by Group N in 1982.

== History ==
From its inception in 1954 until 1965, Group 1, officially documented at first as the first group, was included in Category I (or A), Touring Cars, with a production requirement of between 600 and 1000 cars in a 12 month period. The two categories had up to six groups in this time era, but not consistently or retaining the same definitions.

In 1966 the FIA categories were restructured and Group 1 were placed in Category A, Production Cars, with Category B and C used for Sports and Racing cars respectively. Group 1 essentially remained the same in character but with a heightened production requirement of 5000 cars. In 1982 the numbered groups were replaced by Groups N, A, B, C, D and E.

== Groups 1-9 ==
Categories and Groups of Appendix J 1954 - 1965
Categories	1954	1955	1956	1957	1958	1959	1960	1961	1962	1963	1964	1965
Categories	I. Touring						A. Touring					
Categories	II. Sports				II. Grand Touring		B. Grand Touring					
Categories	-						C. Sports					
Group	1954	1955	1956	1957	1958	1959	1960	1961	1962	1963	1964	1965
Group 1	Normal series production											
Group 2	"Grand Touring" series prod				Modified series prod		Modified series prod					
Group 3	Special series production						Grand Touring Cars					
Group 4	Series production				Normal GT series prod		Sports Car					
Group 5	International				Modified GT series prod		-					
Group 6	-				GT specials		-					

Categories and Groups of Appendix J 1966 - 1981 (Production requirement)
Categories	1966	1967	1968	1969	1970	1971	1972	1973	1974	1975	1976	1977	1978	1979	1980	1981
Categories	A. Production															
Categories	B. Special				B. Experimental Competition						B. Racing Cars					
Categories	C. Racing Cars										-					
Group	1966	1967	1968	1969	1970	1971	1972	1973	1974	1975	1976	1977	1978	1979	1980	1981
Group 1	Series Touring (5000)															
Group 2	Touring (1000)				Special Touring (1000)											
Group 3	Grand Touring (500)				Series Grand Touring (1000)											
Group 4	Sportscars (50/25)				Special Grand Touring (500)						Grand Touring (400)					
Group 5	Special Touring Cars				Sports cars (50)		Sports cars				Special cars derived from Groups 1-4					
Group 6	Prototype sportscars						-				Two-seater racecars					
Group 7	Two-seater racecars										International formula					
Group 8	Formula racing cars						International formula				Formula libre racing cars					
Group 9	Formula libre racing cars										-					
Source: Note: Special may be replaced with Competition in some official documents.
