= Group 4 (motorsport) =

Motorsport regulations

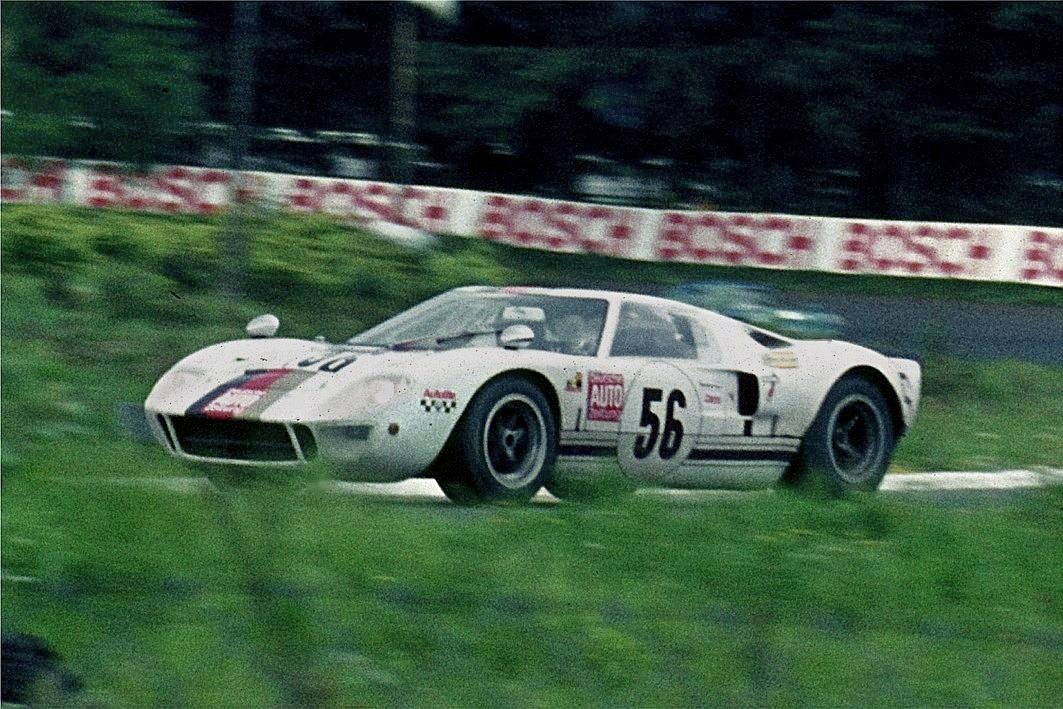
A Ford GT40 contesting the Group 4 Sports Car category at the 1969 1000 km Nürburgring, marked with an S on the rear

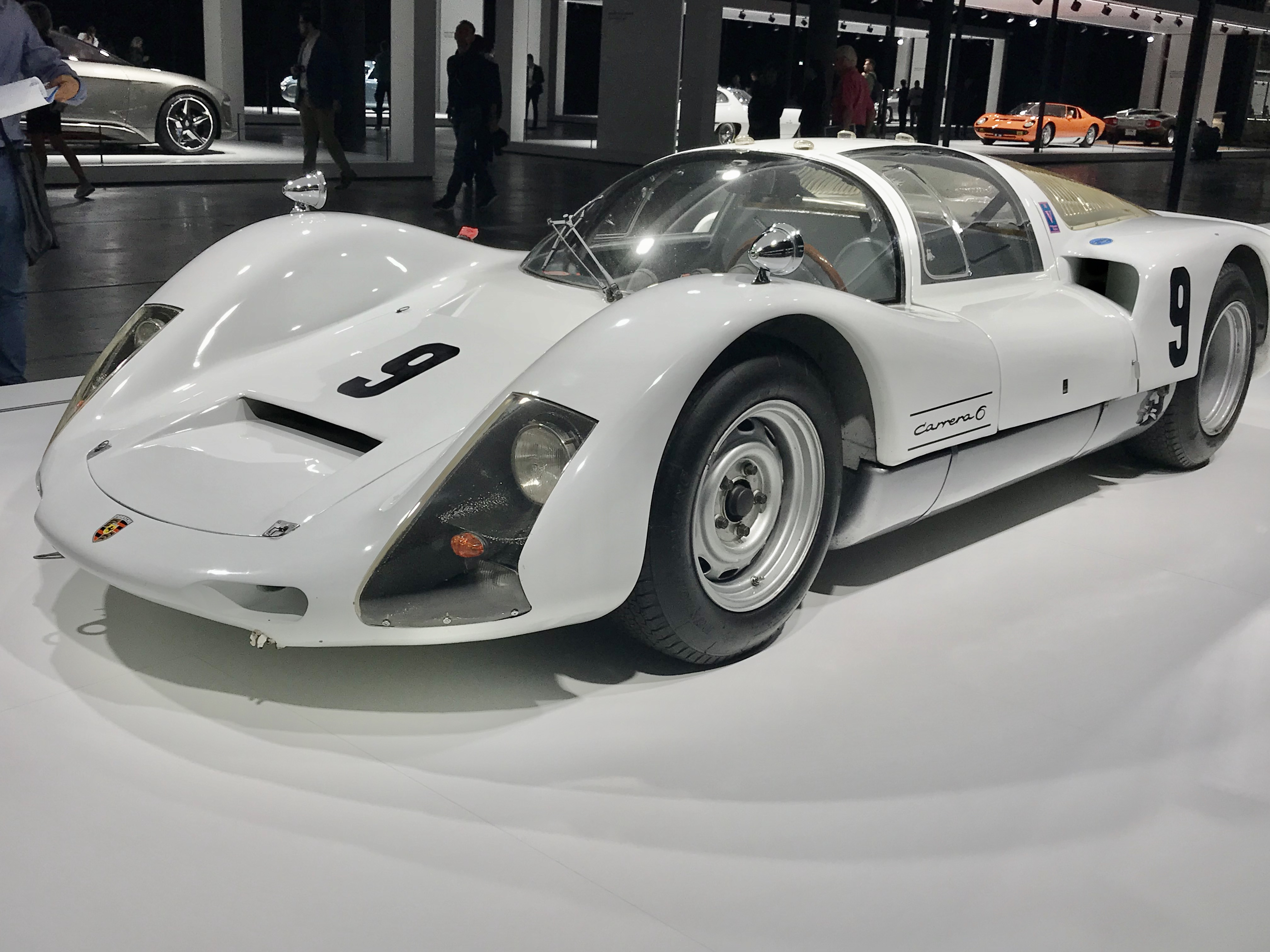
A Group 4 Porsche 906

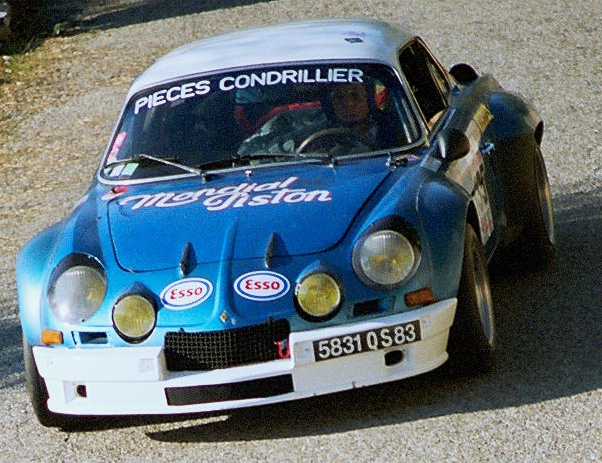
A Group 4 Alpine A110 1800

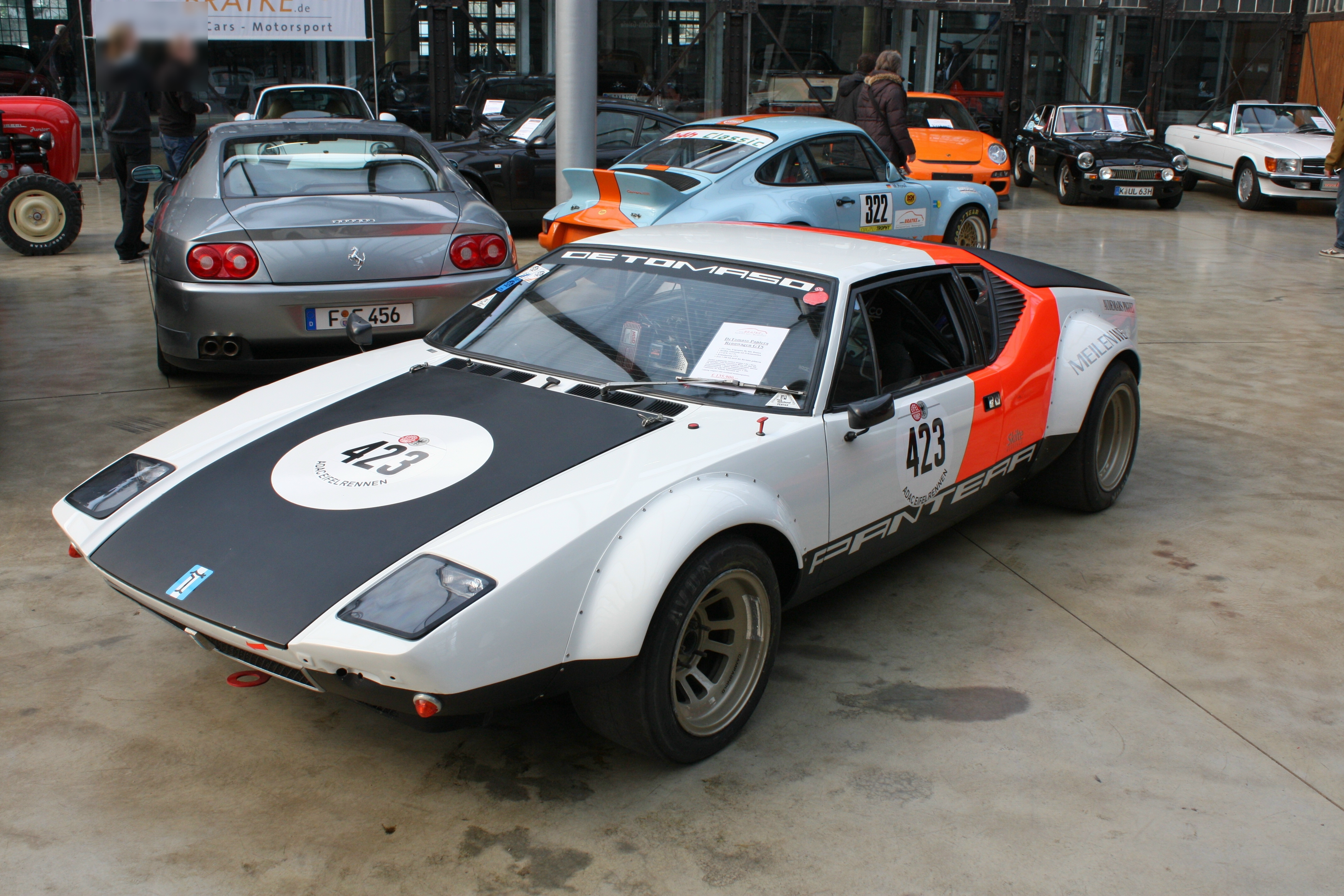
A Group 4 De Tomaso Pantera GTS

Group 4 referred to regulations for sportscars and grand touring (GT) cars used in racing and rallying, as regulated by the FIA. The group was introduced in 1954 and was replaced by Group B for the 1982 season.

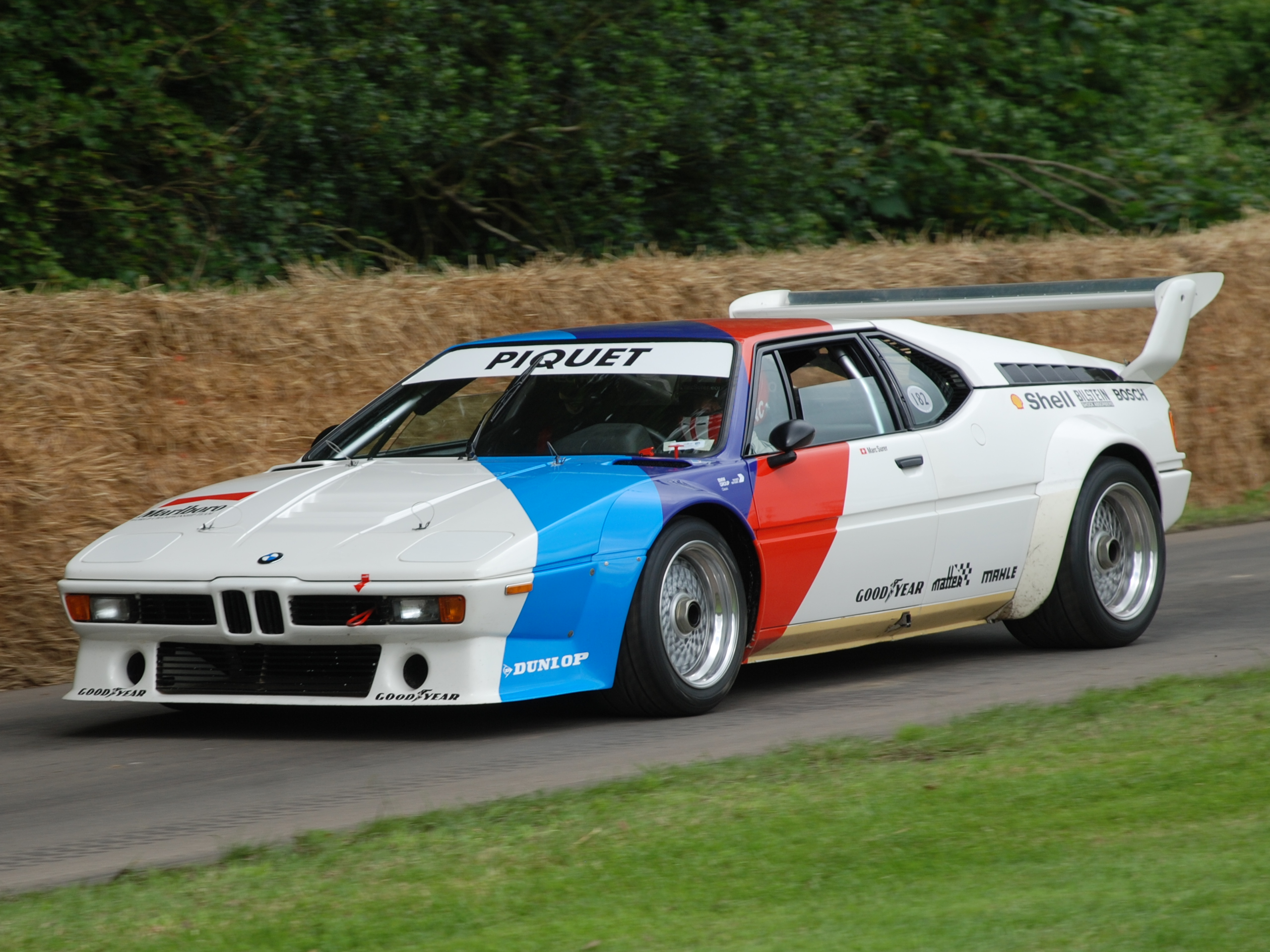
BMW M1 Procar, used in the M1 Procar Championship. These cars were designed and built to FIA Group 4 racing specifications.

== Production requirements ==
Prior to 1966, the FIA's Group 4 classification applied to Sports Cars which were in compliance with FIA Appendix C regulations. It also included recognised Series Touring Cars, Improved Touring Cars and Grand Touring Cars which had been modified beyond the respective Group 1, Group 2 or Group 3 regulations under which they had been homologated.

First announced in October 1964 to give Manufacturers time to prepare, beginning with 1966, an overhaul of FIA categories saw Group 4 Sports Cars redefined such that they were now subject to a minimum production requirement of 50 units in 12 consecutive months and had to be fitted with all equipment necessary for use on public roads. This saw the Shelby 427 Cobra Mk3, the Ford GT40 Mk1 and Ferrari 250 LM homologated in early 1966, despite controversy in the case of the Cobra and Ferrari. The day after Ford's 1967 24 Hours of Le Mans win the FIA announced a 5000cc engine capacity limit applied for 1968 and allowed the homologation of the Lola T70 by including earlier open top cars to be counted toward the total. In April 1968, faced with small Group 6 Prototype fields, the minimum production requirement of Group 4 was reduced to 25 units for the 1969 season. This led Porsche to build a run of 25 12-cylinder Porsche 917s for homologation in April 1969, followed by the Ferrari 512S in January 1970. These new types were basically Group 6 Prototypes with 5 liter instead of 3 liter and thus competed for outright wins.

For 1969, Appendix J of the FIA International Sporting Code defined groups for Touring cars, Grand Touring cars and Sports cars as follows: (numbers between brackets are required minimum production in 12 consecutive months).

- Group 1: series-production touring cars (5,000)
- Group 2: touring cars (1,000)
- Group 3: grand touring cars (500)
- Group 4: sports cars (25)
- Group 5: special touring cars
- Group 6: prototype-sports cars

For 1970, the limited production sports car category was renamed from Group 4 to Group 5 and, in the same year, Group 4 became the class for special grand touring cars with minimum production of 500 in 12 consecutive months

For 1971, the relevant FIA classifications were as follows:

- Group 1: series-production touring cars (5,000)
- Group 2: touring cars (1,000)
- Group 3: series-production grand touring cars (1,000)
- Group 4: special grand touring cars (500)
- Group 5: sports cars (25)
- Group 6: prototype-sports cars

In 1976, the Group 4 production requirement was reduced to 400 in 24 months.

== Sports car racing ==
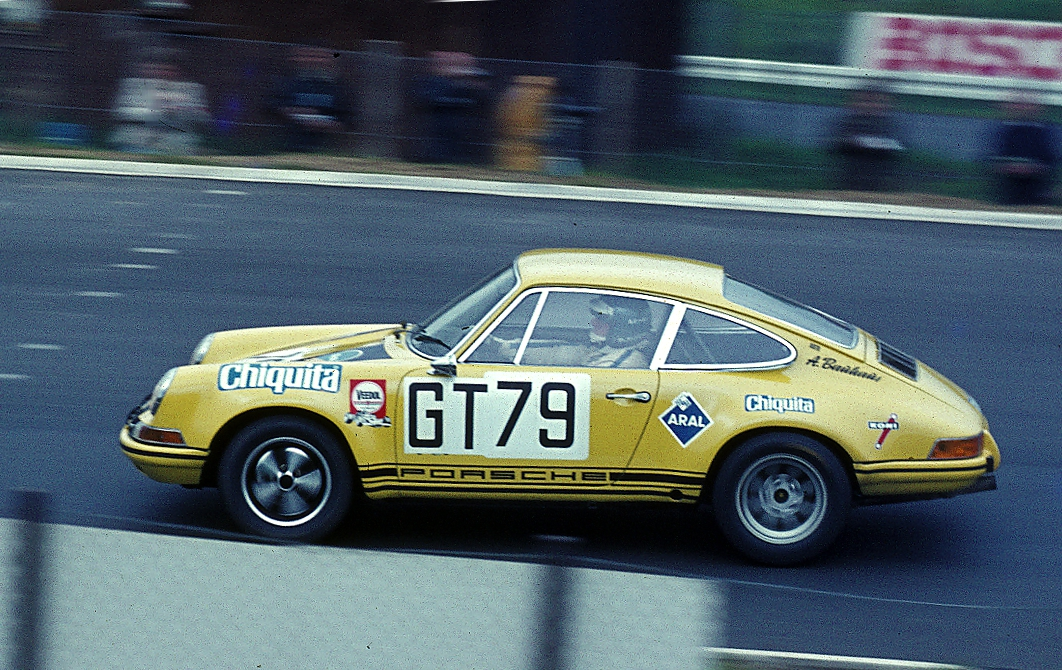
A Porsche 911 competing in the Group 4 Special Grand Touring Car category at the 1970 1000 km Nürburgring

In 1966 and 1967, the Group 4 Sports Cars were mostly sold to and entered by privateers to play a supporting role to the Group 6 prototypes. While factory-entered prototypes like the 7.0L Ford GT40 Mk.II and Mk.IV raced for outright victories, the 4.7L GT40 Mk I entries were competing for Group 4 class wins. Indeed, competitors in the two categories were competing for two different championships, with similar looking cars, the Group 6 cars for the International Championship for Sports-Prototypes and the Group 4 cars for the International Championship for Sports Cars.

For 1968, the rules were changed, so that prototypes were limited to 3.0L, but sports cars of up to 5.0L could still be entered. It was also announced that the minimum production figure for the Group 4 sports cars would be reduced to 25 cars for 1969. With larger engines than the sophisticated prototypes, the simpler and mostly older Group 4 cars were now in contention for outright race wins. An updated old Ford GT40 Mk.I chassis was the winner at Le Mans in both 1968 and 1969. Porsche began work on a production run of 25 cars for the Porsche 917. Ferrari, with some financial help from Fiat, produced the similar Ferrari 512S.

For the 1970 season, the Group 4 Sports car category was renamed and became Group 5 Sports Cars, and Group 4 designation was applied to a new Special Grand Touring category. The new Group 4 was contested by production based cars such as the Ferrari 365 GTB/4 Daytona, Porsche 911 Carrera RS and the De Tomaso Pantera.

The Group 4 GT category was replaced by a new Group B GT class for 1983.

== Rallying ==
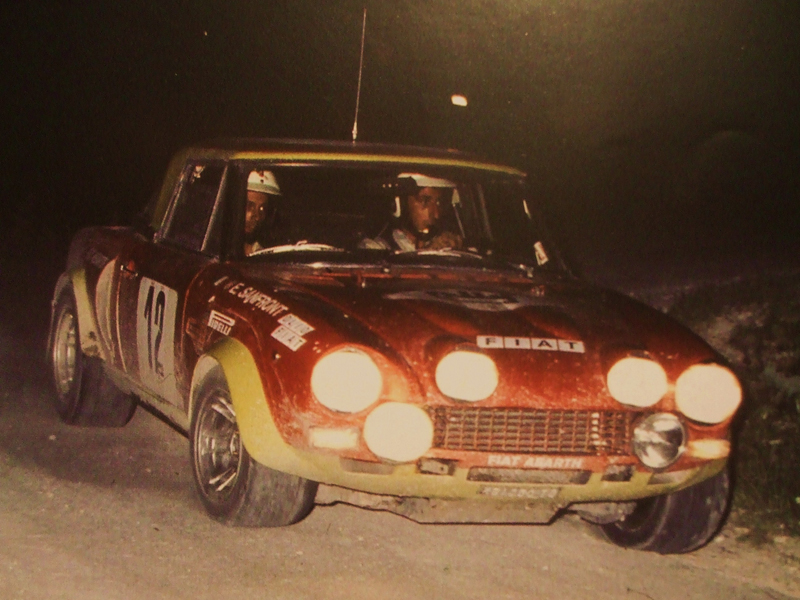
Roberto Cambiaghi and Emanuele Sanfront on a Fiat 124 Abarth Rally at the Rally delle Regioni 1975 (valid for European Rally Championship)

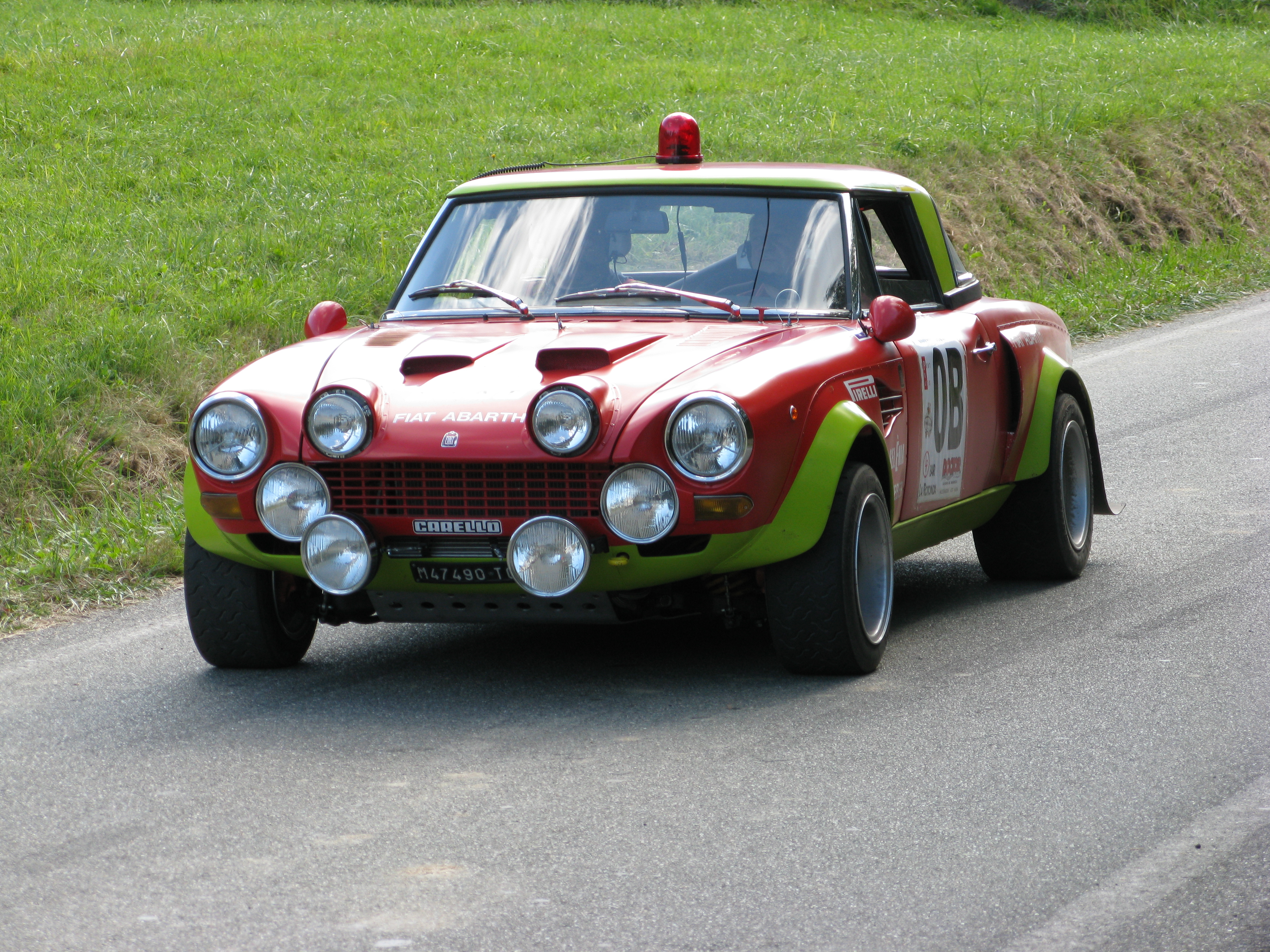
Fiat Abarth 124 rally

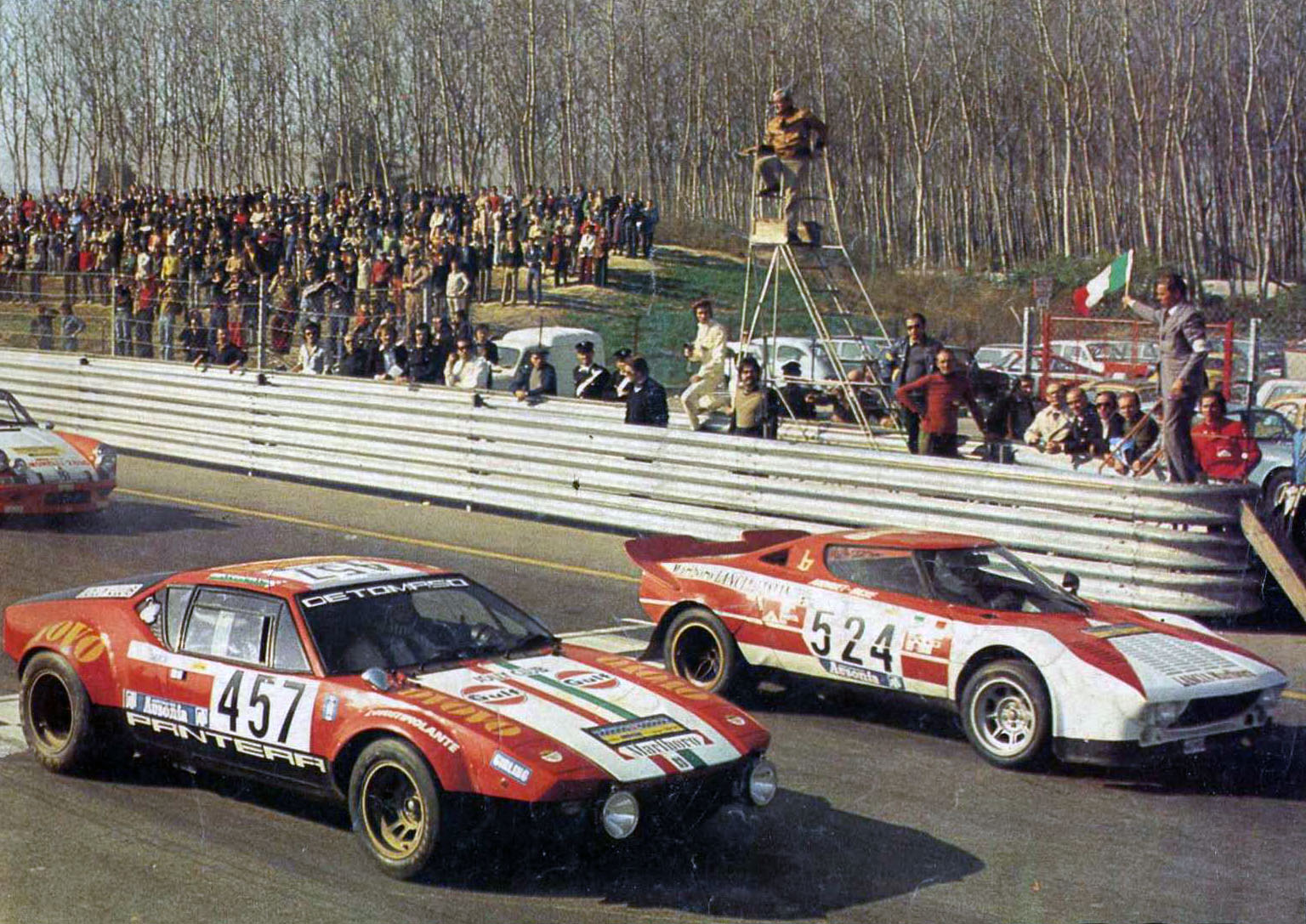
A Group 4 De Tomaso Pantera and Lancia Stratos, pictured in 1973

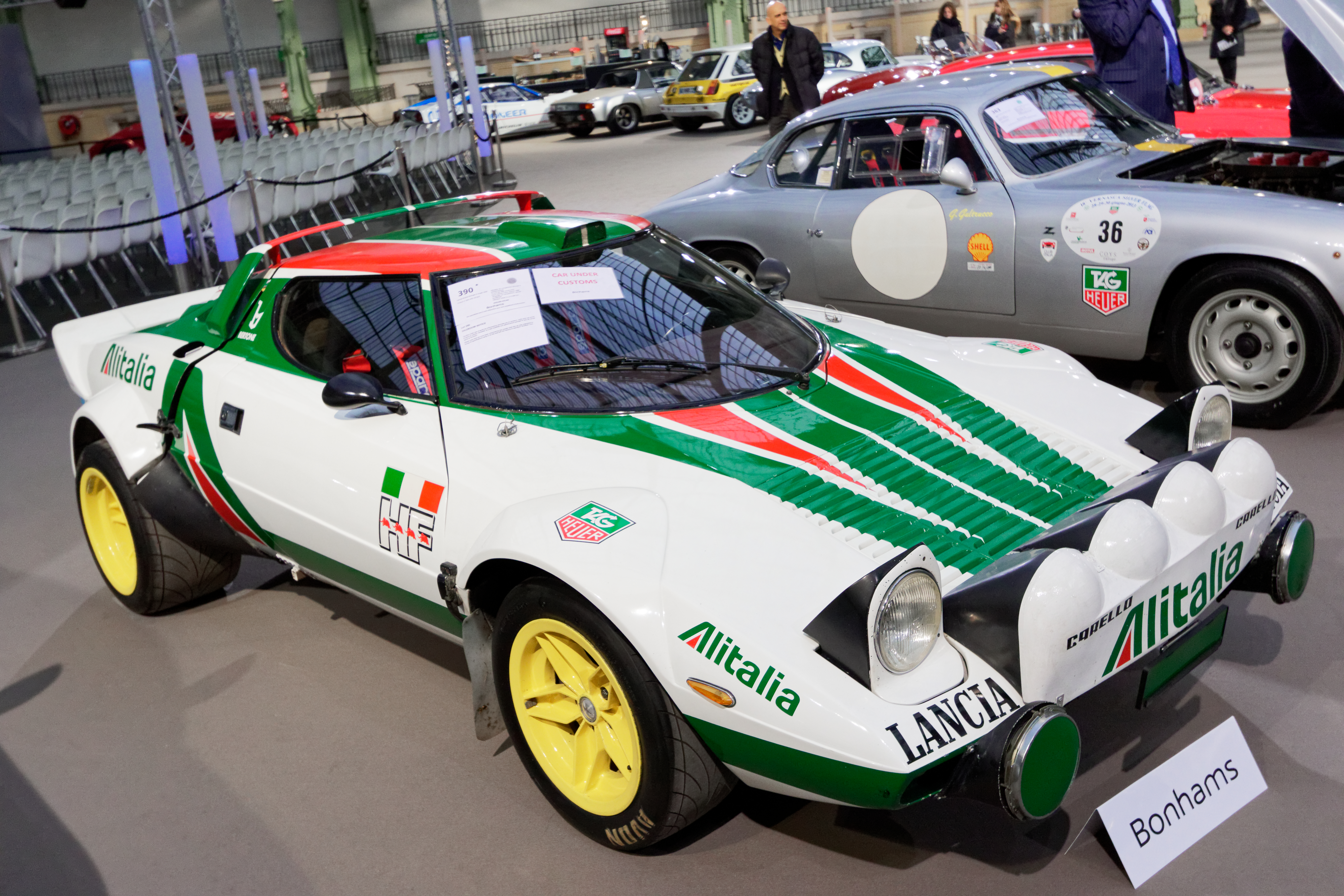
Group 4 Lancia Stratos HF. The Stratos helped Lancia win the World Rally Championship in 1974, 1975 and 1976.

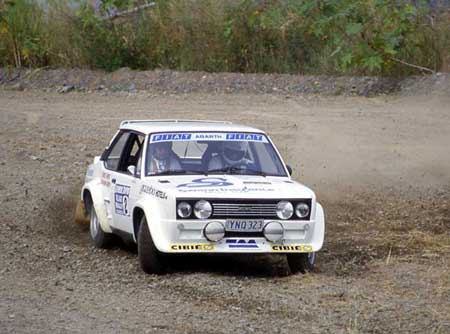
Fiat 131 Abarth Group 4 rally (1982)

The Group 4 regulations were also used as the basis for the World Rally Championships until they were replaced by the Group B regulations. In the mid-1970s to early 1980s rallying, it was necessary to produce 400 identical cars for homologation as a Group 4 rally car. Notable cars included the Ford Escort RS1800, Fiat 131 Abarth, Lancia Stratos HF and the Audi Quattro.

== List of FIA Group 4 homologated cars ==
No.	Marque	Model	Type	Image	Start	End
220	(United States) Shelby	Cobra	Roadster 427		January 2, 1966	January 2, 1966
221	(France) Matra	Djet	5S MB 8S		January 1, 1965	January 1, 1965
222	(France) Alpine	A110	1300		February 1, 1966	February 1, 1966
223	(France) Panhard	24	BA		February 1, 1966	February 1, 1966
224	(United Kingdom) Ford	GT40	Mk I		February 2, 1966	February 2, 1966
225	(Italy) Ferrari	250 LM	Berlinetta		February 1, 1966	February 1, 1966
227	(Germany) Ford	Taunus	P5 Hardtop		April 15, 1966	April 15, 1966
228	(United Kingdom) Tunex	Diva	GT		April 16, 1966	April 16, 1966
229	(Italy) Abarth	1300	OT		April 15, 1966	April 15, 1966
230	(Italy) Abarth	1000	OTR Coupé		April 30, 1966	April 30, 1966
231	(Sweden) Saab	Sonett	II			
234	(Italy) Ferrari	275	GTB 4		April 1, 1967	April 1, 1967
235	(Italy) Lamborghini	350	GT		April 1, 1967	April 1, 1967
236	(Italy) Lamborghini	400	GT 2+2		April 1, 1967	April 1, 1967
237	(United Kingdom) TVR	MkIV	1800S		July 1, 1967	July 1, 1967
238	(United Kingdom) Lotus	Mark 47			January 1, 1969	January 1, 1969
239	(Italy) Ferrari	308	GTB 4		April 1, 1967	April 1, 1967
240	(United Kingdom) Lola	T70	Mk III		February 1, 1968	February 1, 1968
241	(Italy) Abarth	1000	SP		March 1, 1969	March 1, 1969
242	(United Kingdom) Marcos	1300 GT			March 1, 1968	March 1, 1968
242	(Italy) Lamborghini	Urraco P250			July 1, 1975	December 31, 1981
244	(United Kingdom) Chevron	GT			May 1, 1968	May 1, 1968
245	(Italy) Lamborghini	P400	Miura		June 1, 1968	June 1, 1968
246	(Italy) Alfa Romeo	33	Spider		January 1, 1969	January 1, 1969
247	(Italy) Ferrari	206	GT		January 1, 1969	January 1, 1969
248	(United Kingdom) McLaren	M6	GT		August 20, 1968	
249	(Germany) Porsche	910			January 1, 1969	January 1, 1969
250	(Germany) Porsche	917			May 1, 1969	May 1, 1969
251	(Italy) De Tomaso	Mangusta			April 1, 1969	April 1, 1969
252	(Italy) Abarth	2000			April 1, 1969	April 1, 1969
253	(Italy) Ferrari	365	GTB 4 Daytona		June 1, 1969	June 1, 1969
254	(Italy) Ferrari	512	S		July 1, 1969	April 1, 1970
255	(United Kingdom) Chevron	B16	Cosworth		January 2, 1970	January 2, 1970
624	(France) Alpine	A110	1600		January 1, 1970	December 31, 1970
625	(Italy) Alfa Romeo	GTA	Sprint		January 1, 1970	December 31, 1977
626	(Germany) Porsche	914/6			March 1, 1970	October 1, 1971
627	(Italy) Ferrari	246	GT		January 1, 1971	February 1, 1973
628	(France) Citroën	SM	Type SB		April 1, 1971	July 1, 1971
629	(United Kingdom) Range Rover	Classic			April 1, 1971	January 1, 1972
630	(France) Renault	12	Gordini R1173		October 1, 1971	January 1, 1972
632	(Italy) De Tomaso	Pantera			January 1, 1972	July 1, 1972
633	(Italy) Ferrari	365	GTB 4		January 1, 1972	December 31, 1979
634	(United Kingdom) Lotus	Europa	Twin Cam		April 1, 1972	July 1, 1972
637	(Germany) Porsche	Carrera	RS		March 1, 1973	July 1, 1973
638	(France) Renault	17	TS		April 1, 1974	October 1, 1974
639	(Italy) Maserati	AM122	Merak		May 1, 1974	December 31, 1981
646	(United Kingdom) Aston Martin	V8			April 1, 1976	December 31, 1981
631	(Italy) Alfa Romeo	Montreal			January 1, 1972	April 1, 1972
640	(Italy) Lancia	Stratos	HF		October 1, 1974	December 31, 1981
644	(Germany) Opel	Kadett	C GT/E		October 1, 1975	February 1, 1976
645	(Germany) Porsche	911	Turbo		January 1, 1976	January 1, 1977
647	(Italy) Abarth	131	Rally		April 1, 1976	December 31, 1981
648	(Italy) Ferrari	308	GTB		November 1, 1976	December 31, 1981
649	(United Kingdom) Vauxhall	Chevette	HS2300		November 1, 1976	December 31, 1981
650	(United Kingdom) Ford	Escort	RS		April 2, 1977	January 1, 1982
651	(France) Alpine	A310	V6		April 1, 1977	January 1, 1978
652	(Sweden) Saab	99	Turbo Combi Coupé		January 1, 1978	October 1, 1978
653	(United Kingdom) Lotus	Esprit			April 1, 1978	December 31, 1981
654	(United Kingdom) B.L. Triumph	TR8			April 1, 1978	December 31, 1981
655	(United Kingdom) Panther	Lima			October 1, 1978	December 31, 1981
656	(Poland) FSO	Polonez	125 PN		January 1, 1979	April 1, 1980
657	(Poland) FSO	Polonez			January 1, 1979	April 1, 1980
658	(Sweden) Saab	99	Turbo Sedan		February 1, 1979	April 1, 1979
659	(Germany) Audi	80	1600		February 1, 1979	December 31, 1981
660	(Germany) Porsche	924	Turbo		February 1, 1979	April 1, 1979
661	(Germany) Daimler-Benz	450	SLC 5.0		April 1, 1979	December 31, 1981
662	(United Kingdom) Chrysler	Sunbeam	Lotus		April 1, 1979	January 1, 1980
663	(Japan) Toyota	Celica	2000GT Rally RA45		June 1, 1979	December 31, 1981
664	Renault Argentina	12	Alpine		July 1, 1979	December 31, 1981
665	(United Kingdom) Morgan	Plus 8			July 1, 1979	December 31, 1981
666	(Germany) Opel	Ascona	400		November 1, 1979	December 31, 1981
668	(Italy) Alfa Romeo	Alfetta	Turbodelta		February 1, 1980	December 31, 1981
669	(France) Renault	5	Turbo		September 1, 1980	April 1, 1981
670	(Germany) BMW	M1			December 1, 1980	December 31, 1981
671	(Germany) Audi	Quattro	2145		January 2, 1981	January 1, 1982
672	(Germany) Porsche	924	Carrera GT		January 1, 1981	December 31, 1981
673	(Germany) Daimler-Benz	500	SL		January 1, 1980	December 31, 1981
674	(Italy) Alfa Romeo	Alfetta	GT 6 2.5		January 1, 1981	October 1, 1981
675	(Japan) Mitsubishi	Lancer	2000 Turbo A176A		April 1, 1981	December 31, 1981
676	(France) Talbot Matra	Murena	2.2		August 1, 1981	December 31, 1981
677	(Germany) Volkswagen	Golf Mk I	16S		December 1, 1981	December 31, 1981

In addition, cars were homologated for Group 4 as variants of Group 3 cars. Before 1976, this was possible using a "100-off rule": clause bb of Art 260 of Appendix J to the FIA's International Sporting Code 1975 (invoked from Art 266). This rule only required production of 100 of a "bolt-on option kit" of parts, not the production of any modified cars as homologation specials, but was deleted after 1975 and approved components banned "Effective from the end of 1977". Such an approval applies to the Group 4 16-valve TR7, the multi-valve head (and other parts) from the Group 1 Dolomite Sprint being approved as "valid for Group 4" on 1 Oct. 1975 in amendment 1/1V to the Group 3 TR7 homologation papers and reapproved (following production of about 60 16-valve TR7 Sprints in 1977) on 1 Feb. 1978 in amendment 10/8v.

== Groups 1-9 ==
Categories and Groups of Appendix J 1954 - 1965
Categories	1954	1955	1956	1957	1958	1959	1960	1961	1962	1963	1964	1965
Categories	I. Touring						A. Touring					
Categories	II. Sports				II. Grand Touring		B. Grand Touring					
Categories	-						C. Sports					
Group	1954	1955	1956	1957	1958	1959	1960	1961	1962	1963	1964	1965
Group 1	Normal series production											
Group 2	"Grand Touring" series prod				Modified series prod		Modified series prod					
Group 3	Special series production						Grand Touring Cars					
Group 4	Series production				Normal GT series prod		Sports Car					
Group 5	International				Modified GT series prod		-					
Group 6	-				GT specials		-					

Categories and Groups of Appendix J 1966 - 1981 (Production requirement)
Categories	1966	1967	1968	1969	1970	1971	1972	1973	1974	1975	1976	1977	1978	1979	1980	1981
Categories	A. Production															
Categories	B. Special				B. Experimental Competition						B. Racing Cars					
Categories	C. Racing Cars										-					
Group	1966	1967	1968	1969	1970	1971	1972	1973	1974	1975	1976	1977	1978	1979	1980	1981
Group 1	Series Touring (5000)															
Group 2	Touring (1000)				Special Touring (1000)											
Group 3	Grand Touring (500)				Series Grand Touring (1000)											
Group 4	Sportscars (50/25)				Special Grand Touring (500)						Grand Touring (400)					
Group 5	Special Touring Cars				Sports cars (25)		Sports cars				Special cars derived from Groups 1-4					
Group 6	Prototype sportscars						-				Two-seater racecars					
Group 7	Two-seater racecars										International formula					
Group 8	Formula racing cars						International formula				Formula libre racing cars					
Group 9	Formula libre racing cars										-					
Source: Note: Special may be replaced with Competition in some official documents.

== See also ==
- World Sportscar Championship
