= 1984 1000 km of Mosport =

Mosport Park

The 1984 Budweiser GT 1000 Kilometers was the sixth round of the 1984 World Endurance Championship. It took place at Mosport Park, Canada on 5 August 1984.

Several World Championship competitors opted not to participate in the Mosport round, including all B class entries. Three GTO class cars from the IMSA GT Championship chose to enter the round.

== Official results ==
Class winners in bold. Cars failing to complete 75% of the winner's distance marked as Not Classified (NC).

Pos	Class	No	Team	Drivers	Chassis	Tyre	Laps
Pos	Class	No	Team	Drivers	Engine	Tyre	Laps
1	**C1**	**1**	**(Germany) Rothmans Porsche**	**(Germany) Jochen Mass (Belgium) Jacky Ickx**	**Porsche 956**	**D**	**253**
1	**C1**	**1**	**(Germany) Rothmans Porsche**	**(Germany) Jochen Mass (Belgium) Jacky Ickx**	**Porsche Type-935 2.6 L Turbo Flat-6**	**D**	**253**
2	C1	33	(United Kingdom) Skoal Bandit Porsche Team (United Kingdom) John Fitzpatrick Racing	(United Kingdom) David Hobbs (United Kingdom) Rupert Keegan (Austria) Franz Konrad	Porsche 956B	**G**	245
2	C1	33	(United Kingdom) Skoal Bandit Porsche Team (United Kingdom) John Fitzpatrick Racing	(United Kingdom) David Hobbs (United Kingdom) Rupert Keegan (Austria) Franz Konrad	Porsche Type-935 2.6 L Turbo Flat-6	**G**	245
3	**C2**	**81**	**(Italy) Jolly Club**	**(Italy) Almo Coppelli (Italy) Guido Daccò**	**Alba AR2**	**A**	**229**
3	**C2**	**81**	**(Italy) Jolly Club**	**(Italy) Almo Coppelli (Italy) Guido Daccò**	**Giannini Carma FF 1.9 L Turbo I4**	**A**	**229**
4	C1	2	(Germany) Rothmans Porsche	(Germany) Stefan Bellof (United Kingdom) Derek Bell	Porsche 956	**D**	221
4	C1	2	(Germany) Rothmans Porsche	(Germany) Stefan Bellof (United Kingdom) Derek Bell	Porsche Type-935 2.6 L Turbo Flat-6	**D**	221
5	C2	82	(Italy) Maurizio Gellini	(Italy) Maurizio Gellini (Italy) Gerardo Vatielli (Italy) Pasquale Barberio	Alba AR3	?	217
5	C2	82	(Italy) Maurizio Gellini	(Italy) Maurizio Gellini (Italy) Gerardo Vatielli (Italy) Pasquale Barberio	Ford Cosworth DFL 3.3 L V8	?	217
6	C2	80	(Italy) Jolly Club	(Italy) Martino Finotto (Italy) Alfredi Sebastiani (Italy) Carlo Facetti	Alba AR2	**A**	204
6	C2	80	(Italy) Jolly Club	(Italy) Martino Finotto (Italy) Alfredi Sebastiani (Italy) Carlo Facetti	Giannini Carma FF 1.9 L Turbo I4	**A**	204
7	C2	99	(United Kingdom) J.Q.F. Engineering Ltd.	(United Kingdom) Jeremy Rossiter (United Kingdom) Roy Baker (Canada) Peter Lockhart	Tiga GC284	**A**	185
7	C2	99	(United Kingdom) J.Q.F. Engineering Ltd.	(United Kingdom) Jeremy Rossiter (United Kingdom) Roy Baker (Canada) Peter Lockhart	Ford Cosworth BDT 1.8 L Turbo I4	**A**	185
8 NC	C1	20	(Germany) Porsche Kremer Racing	(Canada) Bill Adam (United States) Kees Nierop (South Africa) George Fouché	Porsche 956	**G**	159
8 NC	C1	20	(Germany) Porsche Kremer Racing	(Canada) Bill Adam (United States) Kees Nierop (South Africa) George Fouché	Porsche Type-935 2.6 L Turbo Flat-6	**G**	159
9 NC	C1	3	(Germany) Rothmans Porsche	(Australia) Vern Schuppan (United Kingdom) Nick Mason	Porsche 956	**D**	156
9 NC	C1	3	(Germany) Rothmans Porsche	(Australia) Vern Schuppan (United Kingdom) Nick Mason	Porsche Type-935 2.6 L Turbo Flat-6	**D**	156
10 DNF	C2	84	(United Kingdom) Lyncar Motorsport Ltd.	(Greece) Costas Los (Canada) Allen Berg	Lyncar MS83	**A**	206
10 DNF	C2	84	(United Kingdom) Lyncar Motorsport Ltd.	(Greece) Costas Los (Canada) Allen Berg	Ford Cosworth DFV 3.0 L V8	**A**	206
11 DNF	C1	19	(Switzerland) Brun Motorsport	(Switzerland) Walter Brun (Argentina) Oscar Larrauri	Porsche 956	**D**	204
11 DNF	C1	19	(Switzerland) Brun Motorsport	(Switzerland) Walter Brun (Argentina) Oscar Larrauri	Porsche Type-935 2.6 L Turbo Flat-6	**D**	204
12 DNF	IMSA; GTO	40	(Canada) Bieri Racing	(Canada) Uli Bieri (Canada) Matt Gysler	BMW M1	**G**	190
12 DNF	IMSA; GTO	40	(Canada) Bieri Racing	(Canada) Uli Bieri (Canada) Matt Gysler	BMW M88/1 3.5 L I6	**G**	190
13 DNF	IMSA; GTO	65	(United States) English Enterprizes	(United States) Gary English (United States) Mike Laws	Chevrolet Camaro	?	156
13 DNF	IMSA; GTO	65	(United States) English Enterprizes	(United States) Gary English (United States) Mike Laws	Chevrolet V8	?	156
14 DNF	C1	21	(United Kingdom) Charles Ivey Racing	(United Kingdom) Barry Robinson (United Kingdom) Dudley Wood	Grid S2	**A**	127
14 DNF	C1	21	(United Kingdom) Charles Ivey Racing	(United Kingdom) Barry Robinson (United Kingdom) Dudley Wood	Porsche Type-935 2.9 L Turbo Flat-6	**A**	127
15 DNF	C2	73	(Germany) Gebhardt Motorsport	(Canada) John Graham (Canada) George Schwarz	Gebhardt JC843	**A**	40
15 DNF	C2	73	(Germany) Gebhardt Motorsport	(Canada) John Graham (Canada) George Schwarz	Ford Cosworth DFV 3.0 L V8	**A**	40
16 DNF	IMSA; GTO	60	(Canada) Alps Restoration	(Canada) Peter Aschenbrenner (Canada) Mike Freberg	Audi 80	?	12
16 DNF	IMSA; GTO	60	(Canada) Alps Restoration	(Canada) Peter Aschenbrenner (Canada) Mike Freberg	Audi 2.2 L I5	?	12
DNS	C1	55	(United Kingdom) Skoal Bandit Porsche Team (United Kingdom) John Fitzpatrick Racing	(United Kingdom) Rupert Keegan (Austria) Franz Konrad	Porsche 956	**G**	-
DNS	C1	55	(United Kingdom) Skoal Bandit Porsche Team (United Kingdom) John Fitzpatrick Racing	(United Kingdom) Rupert Keegan (Austria) Franz Konrad	Porsche Type-935 2.6 L Turbo Flat-6	**G**	-

== Statistics ==
- Pole Position - #2 Rothmans Porsche - 1:12.107
- Fastest Lap - #2 Rothmans Porsche - 1:13.874
- Average Speed - 166.550 km/h (103.489 mph)

World Sportscar Championship
Previous race: 1984 1000 km of Brands Hatch	1984 season	Next race: 1984 1000 km of Spa
