= 1984 1000 km of Nürburgring =

Sports car endurance race in Germany

The Nurburgring GP course in 1984

The 1984 Int. ADAC-1000-km-Rennen was the fourth round of the 1984 World Endurance Championship. It took place at the Nürburgring, West Germany on 15 July 1984.

== Official results ==
Class winners in bold. Cars failing to complete 75% of the winner's distance marked as Not Classified (NC).

Pos	Class	No	Team	Drivers	Chassis	Tyre	Laps
Pos	Class	No	Team	Drivers	Engine	Tyre	Laps
1	**C1**	**2**	**(West Germany) Rothmans Porsche**	**(West Germany) Stefan Bellof (United Kingdom) Derek Bell**	**Porsche 956**	**D**	**207**
1	**C1**	**2**	**(West Germany) Rothmans Porsche**	**(West Germany) Stefan Bellof (United Kingdom) Derek Bell**	**Porsche Type-935 2.6 L Turbo Flat-6**	**D**	**207**
2	C1	33	(United Kingdom) Skoal Bandit Porsche Team (United Kingdom) John Fitzpatrick Racing	(United Kingdom) David Hobbs (Belgium) Thierry Boutsen	Porsche 956B	**Y**	207
2	C1	33	(United Kingdom) Skoal Bandit Porsche Team (United Kingdom) John Fitzpatrick Racing	(United Kingdom) David Hobbs (Belgium) Thierry Boutsen	Porsche Type-935 2.6 L Turbo Flat-6	**Y**	207
3	C1	5	(Italy) Martini Racing	(Italy) Alessandro Nannini (Italy) Paolo Barilla	Lancia LC2	**D**	206
3	C1	5	(Italy) Martini Racing	(Italy) Alessandro Nannini (Italy) Paolo Barilla	Ferrari 308C 3.0 L Turbo V8	**D**	206
4	C1	14	(United Kingdom) Canon Racing (United Kingdom) GTi Engineering	(United Kingdom) Jonathan Palmer (Netherlands) Jan Lammers (West Germany) Christian Danner	Porsche 956	**D**	205
4	C1	14	(United Kingdom) Canon Racing (United Kingdom) GTi Engineering	(United Kingdom) Jonathan Palmer (Netherlands) Jan Lammers (West Germany) Christian Danner	Porsche Type-935 2.6 L Turbo Flat-6	**D**	205
5	C1	10	(West Germany) Porsche Kremer Racing	(Switzerland) Marc Surer (West Germany) Manfred Winkelhock	Porsche 956B	**D**	204
5	C1	10	(West Germany) Porsche Kremer Racing	(Switzerland) Marc Surer (West Germany) Manfred Winkelhock	Porsche Type-935 2.6 L Turbo Flat-6	**D**	204
6	C1	19	(Switzerland) Team Gaggia Brun	(Argentina) Oscar Larrauri (Italy) Massimo Sigala	Porsche 956	**D**	203
6	C1	19	(Switzerland) Team Gaggia Brun	(Argentina) Oscar Larrauri (Italy) Massimo Sigala	Porsche Type-935 2.6 L Turbo Flat-6	**D**	203
7	C1	1	(West Germany) Rothmans Porsche	(West Germany) Jochen Mass (Belgium) Jacky Ickx	Porsche 956	**D**	201
7	C1	1	(West Germany) Rothmans Porsche	(West Germany) Jochen Mass (Belgium) Jacky Ickx	Porsche Type-935 2.6 L Turbo Flat-6	**D**	201
8	C1	7	(West Germany) New-Man Joest Racing	(Sweden) Stefan Johansson (France) Henri Pescarolo (Brazil) Ayrton Senna	Porsche 956	**D**	197
8	C1	7	(West Germany) New-Man Joest Racing	(Sweden) Stefan Johansson (France) Henri Pescarolo (Brazil) Ayrton Senna	Porsche Type-935 2.6 L Turbo Flat-6	**D**	197
9	C1	20	(Switzerland) Brun Motorsport GmbH	(Switzerland) Walter Brun (West Germany) Prince Leopold von Bayern	Porsche 956	**D**	196
9	C1	20	(Switzerland) Brun Motorsport GmbH	(Switzerland) Walter Brun (West Germany) Prince Leopold von Bayern	Porsche Type-935 2.6 L Turbo Flat-6	**D**	196
10	C1	12	(West Germany) D.S. Porsche Racing Team	(West Germany) Volkert Merl (West Germany) Dieter Schornstein (West Germany) "John Winter"	Porsche 956	**D**	194
10	C1	12	(West Germany) D.S. Porsche Racing Team	(West Germany) Volkert Merl (West Germany) Dieter Schornstein (West Germany) "John Winter"	Porsche Type-935 2.6 L Turbo Flat-6	**D**	194
11	C1	55	(United Kingdom) Skoal Bandit Porsche Team (United Kingdom) John Fitzpatrick Racing	(United Kingdom) Rupert Keegan (United Kingdom) Guy Edwards	Porsche 956	**Y**	191
11	C1	55	(United Kingdom) Skoal Bandit Porsche Team (United Kingdom) John Fitzpatrick Racing	(United Kingdom) Rupert Keegan (United Kingdom) Guy Edwards	Porsche Type-935 2.6 L Turbo Flat-6	**Y**	191
12	C1	4	(Italy) Martini Racing	(Italy) Riccardo Patrese (France) Bob Wollek	Lancia LC2	**D**	189
12	C1	4	(Italy) Martini Racing	(Italy) Riccardo Patrese (France) Bob Wollek	Ferrari 308C 3.0 L Turbo V8	**D**	189
13	**C2**	**70**	**(United Kingdom) Spice-Tiga Racing**	**(United Kingdom) Gordon Spice (United Kingdom) Ray Bellm (Australia) Neil Crang**	**Tiga GC84**	**A**	**185**
13	**C2**	**70**	**(United Kingdom) Spice-Tiga Racing**	**(United Kingdom) Gordon Spice (United Kingdom) Ray Bellm (Australia) Neil Crang**	**Ford Cosworth DFL 3.3 L V8**	**A**	**185**
14	C2	67	(United States) The B.F. Goodrich Co.	(United States) Jim Busby (United States) Pete Halsmer	Lola T616	**BF**	178
14	C2	67	(United States) The B.F. Goodrich Co.	(United States) Jim Busby (United States) Pete Halsmer	Mazda 13B 1.3 L 2-Rotor	**BF**	178
15	C1	11	(West Germany) Kremer Racing	(Netherlands) Kees Kroesemeijer (South Africa) George Fouché	Porsche-Kremer CK5	**G**	177
15	C1	11	(West Germany) Kremer Racing	(Netherlands) Kees Kroesemeijer (South Africa) George Fouché	Porsche Type-935 3.0 L Turbo Flat-6	**G**	177
16	**B**	**106**	**(West Germany) Helmut Gall**	**(West Germany) Helmut Gall (West Germany) Kurt König (West Germany) Altfrid Heger**	**BMW M1**	**D**	**175**
16	**B**	**106**	**(West Germany) Helmut Gall**	**(West Germany) Helmut Gall (West Germany) Kurt König (West Germany) Altfrid Heger**	**BMW M88/1 3.5 L I6**	**D**	**175**
17	B	109	(West Germany) Rolf Göring	(West Germany) Rolf Göring (West Germany) Fritz Müller (Switzerland) Hans-Jörg Dürig	BMW M1	**D**	175
17	B	109	(West Germany) Rolf Göring	(West Germany) Rolf Göring (West Germany) Fritz Müller (Switzerland) Hans-Jörg Dürig	BMW M88/1 3.5 L I6	**D**	175
18	**IMSA; GTX**	**65**	**(Sweden) Tuff Kote Dinol Racing**	**(Sweden) Jan Lundgårdh (Sweden) Kurt Simonsen**	**Porsche 935 L1**	?	**174**
18	**IMSA; GTX**	**65**	**(Sweden) Tuff Kote Dinol Racing**	**(Sweden) Jan Lundgårdh (Sweden) Kurt Simonsen**	**Porsche Type-930 2.9 L Turbo Flat-6**	?	**174**
19	B	101	(Denmark) Jens Winther	(Denmark) Jens Winther (Denmark) Lars-Viggo Jensen (United Kingdom) David Mercer	BMW M1	**A**	174
19	B	101	(Denmark) Jens Winther	(Denmark) Jens Winther (Denmark) Lars-Viggo Jensen (United Kingdom) David Mercer	BMW M88/1 3.5 L I6	**A**	174
20	IMSA; GTX	131	(Italy) "Victor"	(Italy) "Victor" (Italy) Gianni Giudici (Switzerland) Angelo Pallavicini	Porsche 935	?	173
20	IMSA; GTX	131	(Italy) "Victor"	(Italy) "Victor" (Italy) Gianni Giudici (Switzerland) Angelo Pallavicini	Porsche Type-930 3.2 L Turbo Flat-6	?	173
21	C1	18	(West Germany) Obermaier Racing	(West Germany) Jürgen Lässig (United Kingdom) David Sutherland (New Zealand) Mike Thackwell	Porsche 956	**D**	171
21	C1	18	(West Germany) Obermaier Racing	(West Germany) Jürgen Lässig (United Kingdom) David Sutherland (New Zealand) Mike Thackwell	Porsche Type-935 2.6 L Turbo Flat-6	**D**	171
22	B	113	(Sweden) Strandell Motors	(Sweden) Kenneth Leim (West Germany) Götz von Tschirnhaus	Porsche 930	?	167
22	B	113	(Sweden) Strandell Motors	(Sweden) Kenneth Leim (West Germany) Götz von Tschirnhaus	Porsche 3.3 L Turbo Flat-6	?	167
23	C2	73	(West Germany) Gebhardt Motorsport	(West Germany) Frank Jelinski (West Germany) Günter Gebhardt (Switzerland) Mario Ketterer	Gebhardt JC843	?	161
23	C2	73	(West Germany) Gebhardt Motorsport	(West Germany) Frank Jelinski (West Germany) Günter Gebhardt (Switzerland) Mario Ketterer	Ford Cosworth DFV 3.0 L V8	?	161
24	C2	80	(Italy) Jolly Club	(Italy) Carlo Facetti (Italy) Martino Finotto (Italy) Alfredo Sebastiani	Alba AR2	**A**	160
24	C2	80	(Italy) Jolly Club	(Italy) Carlo Facetti (Italy) Martino Finotto (Italy) Alfredo Sebastiani	Giannini Carma FF 1.9 L Turbo I4	**A**	160
25	B	112	(West Germany) Bernd Schiller	(West Germany) Wolfgang Braun (United Kingdom) Roy Baker (Switzerland) Claude Haldi	Porsche 930	?	159
25	B	112	(West Germany) Bernd Schiller	(West Germany) Wolfgang Braun (United Kingdom) Roy Baker (Switzerland) Claude Haldi	Porsche 3.3 L Turbo Flat-6	?	159
26	B	104	(West Germany) Dr. von Staehr	(West Germany) Wolf-Georg von Staehr (West Germany) Ulli Richter	Porsche 924 Carrera GTS	**P**	?
26	B	104	(West Germany) Dr. von Staehr	(West Germany) Wolf-Georg von Staehr (West Germany) Ulli Richter	Porsche 2.0 L Turbo I4	**P**	?
27	**IMSA; GTP**	**88**	**(United Kingdom) Arthur Hough Pressings (United Kingdom) Ark Racing**	**(United Kingdom) Max Payne (United Kingdom) Chris Ashmore**	**Ceekar 83J**	**A**	**156**
27	**IMSA; GTP**	**88**	**(United Kingdom) Arthur Hough Pressings (United Kingdom) Ark Racing**	**(United Kingdom) Max Payne (United Kingdom) Chris Ashmore**	**Ford Cosworth BDX 2.0 L I4**	**A**	**156**
28	B	115	(West Germany) Probst und Mentel	(West Germany) Helge Probst (West Germany) Knuth Mentel (West Germany) Karl-Heinz Gürthler	Porsche 928S	?	154
28	B	115	(West Germany) Probst und Mentel	(West Germany) Helge Probst (West Germany) Knuth Mentel (West Germany) Karl-Heinz Gürthler	Porsche 4.7 L V8	?	154
29 NC	B	114	(West Germany) Peter Reuter	(West Germany) Peter Reuter (West Germany) Uwe Reich (West Germany) Wolf-Dieter Feuerlein	Porsche 930	?	143
29 NC	B	114	(West Germany) Peter Reuter	(West Germany) Peter Reuter (West Germany) Uwe Reich (West Germany) Wolf-Dieter Feuerlein	Porsche 3.3 L Flat-6	?	143
30 NC	C2	85	(France) Hubert Striebig	(France) Hubert Striebig (France) Noël del Bello (Morocco) Max Cohen-Olivar	Sthemo SM C2	?	138
30 NC	C2	85	(France) Hubert Striebig	(France) Hubert Striebig (France) Noël del Bello (Morocco) Max Cohen-Olivar	BMW M88/1 3.5 L I6	?	138
31 DNF	C2	82	(Italy) Maurizio Gellini	(Italy) Maurizio Gellini (Italy) Pasquale Barberio (Italy) Gerardo Vatielli	Alba AR3	?	119
31 DNF	C2	82	(Italy) Maurizio Gellini	(Italy) Maurizio Gellini (Italy) Pasquale Barberio (Italy) Gerardo Vatielli	Ford Cosworth DFL 3.3 L V8	?	119
32 DNF	B	111	(West Germany) Walter Mertes	(West Germany) Walter Mertes (West Germany) Olaf Manthey	BMW M1	**G**	116
32 DNF	B	111	(West Germany) Walter Mertes	(West Germany) Walter Mertes (West Germany) Olaf Manthey	BMW M88/1 3.5 L I6	**G**	116
33 DNF	C2	81	(Italy) Jolly Club	(Italy) Almo Coppelli (Italy) Davide Pavia (Italy) Guido Daccò	Alba AR2	**A**	88
33 DNF	C2	81	(Italy) Jolly Club	(Italy) Almo Coppelli (Italy) Davide Pavia (Italy) Guido Daccò	Giannini Carma FF 1.9 L Turbo I4	**A**	88
34 DNF	C1	9	(Switzerland) Schiesser Porsche Brun	(West Germany) Hans-Joachim Stuck (West Germany) Harald Grohs	Porsche 956B	**D**	180
34 DNF	C1	9	(Switzerland) Schiesser Porsche Brun	(West Germany) Hans-Joachim Stuck (West Germany) Harald Grohs	Porsche Type-935 2.6 L Turbo Flat-6	**D**	180
35 DNF	C2	94	(West Germany) Siegfried Rieger	(West Germany) Siegfried Rieger (West Germany) Rolf Götz (United States) Carl Kirsts	Rieger C2	?	64
35 DNF	C2	94	(West Germany) Siegfried Rieger	(West Germany) Siegfried Rieger (West Germany) Rolf Götz (United States) Carl Kirsts	Ford Cosworth DFV 3.5 L V8	?	64
36 DNF	B	116	(West Germany) Georg Memminger	(West Germany) Georg Memminger (West Germany) Heinz Kuhn-Weiss (Italy) Bruno Rebai	Porsche 930	?	62
36 DNF	B	116	(West Germany) Georg Memminger	(West Germany) Georg Memminger (West Germany) Heinz Kuhn-Weiss (Italy) Bruno Rebai	Porsche 3.3 L Turbo Flat-6	?	62
37 DNF	C2	68	(United States) The B.F. Goodrich Co.	(United States) Rick Knoop (Austria) Dieter Quester	Lola T616	**BF**	53
37 DNF	C2	68	(United States) The B.F. Goodrich Co.	(United States) Rick Knoop (Austria) Dieter Quester	Mazda 13B 1.3 L 2-Rotor	**BF**	53
38 DNF	B	102	(West Germany) Racing Team Jürgensen GmbH	(West Germany) Hans Christian Jürgensen (West Germany) Edgar Dören (West Germany) Jürgen Fritzsche	BMW M1	?	48
38 DNF	B	102	(West Germany) Racing Team Jürgensen GmbH	(West Germany) Hans Christian Jürgensen (West Germany) Edgar Dören (West Germany) Jürgen Fritzsche	BMW M88/1 3.5 L I6	?	48
39 DNF	C2	72	(West Germany) Gebhardt Motorsport	(West Germany) Jan Thoelke (West Germany) Udo Wagenhäuser (West Germany) Jürgen Weiler	Gebhardt JC842	**A**	39
39 DNF	C2	72	(West Germany) Gebhardt Motorsport	(West Germany) Jan Thoelke (West Germany) Udo Wagenhäuser (West Germany) Jürgen Weiler	BMW M12/7 2.0 L I4	**A**	39
40 DNF	C1	38	(West Germany) Motorsportclub Rosenheim e.V.	(West Germany) Martin Wagenstetter (West Germany) Kurt Hild	Lotec C302	?	27
40 DNF	C1	38	(West Germany) Motorsportclub Rosenheim e.V.	(West Germany) Martin Wagenstetter (West Germany) Kurt Hild	Ford Cosworth DFV 3.0 L V8	?	27
41 DNF	B	111	(United Kingdom) Charles Ivey Racing	(United Kingdom) Paul Smith (United Kingdom) Pete Lovett (United Kingdom) Roger Eccles	Porsche 930	**A**	9
41 DNF	B	111	(United Kingdom) Charles Ivey Racing	(United Kingdom) Paul Smith (United Kingdom) Pete Lovett (United Kingdom) Roger Eccles	Porsche 3.3 L Turbo Flat-6	**A**	9
42 DNF	C1	48	(West Germany) GWB Ford Zakspeed Team	(West Germany) Klaus Ludwig (West Germany) Klaus Niedzwiedz	Zakspeed C1/8	**G**	2
42 DNF	C1	48	(West Germany) GWB Ford Zakspeed Team	(West Germany) Klaus Ludwig (West Germany) Klaus Niedzwiedz	Ford Cosworth DFL 4.0 L V8	**G**	2
DNS	C1	16	(United Kingdom) GTi Engineering	(Australia) Vern Schuppan (West Germany) Christian Danner	Porsche 956	**D**	-
DNS	C1	16	(United Kingdom) GTi Engineering	(Australia) Vern Schuppan (West Germany) Christian Danner	Porsche Type-935 2.6 L Flat-6	**D**	-
DNS	C1	34	(United Kingdom) John Fitzpatrick Racing	(Austria) Franz Konrad (United Kingdom) David Hobbs	Porsche 956	**Y**	-
DNS	C1	34	(United Kingdom) John Fitzpatrick Racing	(Austria) Franz Konrad (United Kingdom) David Hobbs	Porsche Type-935 2.6 L Flat-6	**Y**	-
DNQ	B	105	(Switzerland) Hobby Rallye Ticino	(Switzerland) Jean-Pierre Frey (Switzerland) Olindo Del-Thé (Switzerland) Fabio Ciseri	Porsche 930	?	-
DNQ	B	105	(Switzerland) Hobby Rallye Ticino	(Switzerland) Jean-Pierre Frey (Switzerland) Olindo Del-Thé (Switzerland) Fabio Ciseri	Porsche 3.3 L Turbo Flat-6	?	-
DNQ	B	107	(West Germany) Franz Fuchs	(West Germany) Franz Fuchs (West Germany) Hartmut Bauer	Renault 5 Turbo	?	-
DNQ	B	107	(West Germany) Franz Fuchs	(West Germany) Franz Fuchs (West Germany) Hartmut Bauer	Renault 1.4 L Turbo I4	?	-

== Statistics ==
- Pole Position - #2 Rothmans Porsche - 1:28.68
- Fastest Lap - #14 GTi Engineering - 1:32.75
- Average Speed - 156.383 km/h (97.172 mph)

World Sportscar Championship
Previous race: 1984 24 Hours of Le Mans	1984 season	Next race: 1984 1000 km of Brands Hatch
