= 1984 1000 km of Brands Hatch =

Layout of the Brands Hatch (1976–1987)

The 1984 British Aerospace 1000 was the fifth round of the 1984 World Endurance Championship. Points were however only awarded in the Drivers Championship, leading to several teams opting to not participate. It took place at Brands Hatch, Great Britain on 29 July 1984.

== Official results ==
Class winners in bold. Cars failing to complete 75% of the winner's distance marked as Not Classified (NC).

Pos	Class	No	Team	Drivers	Chassis	Tyre	Laps
Pos	Class	No	Team	Drivers	Engine	Tyre	Laps
1	**C1**	**14**	**(United Kingdom) GTi Engineering**	**(United Kingdom) Jonathan Palmer (Netherlands) Jan Lammers**	**Porsche 956**	**D**	**238**
1	**C1**	**14**	**(United Kingdom) GTi Engineering**	**(United Kingdom) Jonathan Palmer (Netherlands) Jan Lammers**	**Porsche Type-935 2.6 L Turbo Flat-6**	**D**	**238**
2	C1	8	(Germany) Joest Racing	(Germany) Jochen Mass (France) Henri Pescarolo	Porsche 956B	**D**	236
2	C1	8	(Germany) Joest Racing	(Germany) Jochen Mass (France) Henri Pescarolo	Porsche Type-935 2.6 L Turbo Flat-6	**D**	236
3	C1	55	(United Kingdom) Skoal Bandit Porsche Team (United Kingdom) John Fitzpatrick Racing	(United Kingdom) Rupert Keegan (United Kingdom) Guy Edwards (Belgium) Thierry Boutsen	Porsche 962	**G**	234
3	C1	55	(United Kingdom) Skoal Bandit Porsche Team (United Kingdom) John Fitzpatrick Racing	(United Kingdom) Rupert Keegan (United Kingdom) Guy Edwards (Belgium) Thierry Boutsen	Porsche Type-935 2.6 L Turbo Flat-6	**G**	234
4	C1	10	(Germany) Porsche Kremer Racing	(United Kingdom) David Sutherland (South Africa) Desiré Wilson (South Africa) George Fouché	Porsche 956	**G**	229
4	C1	10	(Germany) Porsche Kremer Racing	(United Kingdom) David Sutherland (South Africa) Desiré Wilson (South Africa) George Fouché	Porsche Type-935 2.6 L Turbo Flat-6	**G**	229
5	C1	19	(Switzerland) Team Warsteiner Brun	(Germany) Stefan Bellof (Germany) Harald Grohs	Porsche 956B	**D**	224
5	C1	19	(Switzerland) Team Warsteiner Brun	(Germany) Stefan Bellof (Germany) Harald Grohs	Porsche Type-935 2.6 L Turbo Flat-6	**D**	224
6	C1	33	(United Kingdom) John Fitzpatrick Racing	(United Kingdom) David Hobbs (United Kingdom) Guy Edwards (Belgium) Thierry Boutsen	Porsche 956	**G**	222
6	C1	33	(United Kingdom) John Fitzpatrick Racing	(United Kingdom) David Hobbs (United Kingdom) Guy Edwards (Belgium) Thierry Boutsen	Porsche Type-935 2.6 L Turbo Flat-6	**G**	222
7	C1	5	(Italy) Martini Racing	(Italy) Mauro Baldi (Italy) Pierluigi Martini (France) Bob Wollek	Lancia LC2	**D**	221
7	C1	5	(Italy) Martini Racing	(Italy) Mauro Baldi (Italy) Pierluigi Martini (France) Bob Wollek	Ferrari 308C 3.0 L Turbo V8	**D**	221
8	C1	9	(Switzerland) Team Warsteiner Brun	(Switzerland) Walter Brun (Germany) Prince Leopold von Bayern	Porsche 956	**D**	221
8	C1	9	(Switzerland) Team Warsteiner Brun	(Switzerland) Walter Brun (Germany) Prince Leopold von Bayern	Porsche Type-935 2.6 L Turbo Flat-6	**D**	221
9	C1	12	(Germany) D.S. Porsche Racing Team	(Germany) Volkert Merl (Germany) Dieter Schornstein (Germany) "John Winter"	Porsche 956	**D**	217
9	C1	12	(Germany) D.S. Porsche Racing Team	(Germany) Volkert Merl (Germany) Dieter Schornstein (Germany) "John Winter"	Porsche Type-935 2.6 L Turbo Flat-6	**D**	217
10	**C2**	**70**	**(United Kingdom) Spice-Tiga Racing**	**(United Kingdom) Ray Bellm (Australia) Neil Crang**	**Tiga GC84**	**A**	**207**
10	**C2**	**70**	**(United Kingdom) Spice-Tiga Racing**	**(United Kingdom) Ray Bellm (Australia) Neil Crang**	**Ford Cosworth DFL 3.3 L V8**	**A**	**207**
11	C1	21	(United Kingdom) Charles Ivey Racing	(United Kingdom) Barry Robinson (United Kingdom) Dudley Wood	Grid S2	**A**	203
11	C1	21	(United Kingdom) Charles Ivey Racing	(United Kingdom) Barry Robinson (United Kingdom) Dudley Wood	Porsche Type-935 2.9 L Turbo Flat-6	**A**	203
12	**B**	**101**	**Jens Winther; Team Castrol Denmark**	**(Denmark) Jens Winther (Denmark) Lars-Viggo Jensen (United Kingdom) David Mercer**	**BMW M1**	**A**	**191**
12	**B**	**101**	**Jens Winther; Team Castrol Denmark**	**(Denmark) Jens Winther (Denmark) Lars-Viggo Jensen (United Kingdom) David Mercer**	**BMW M88/1 3.5 L I6**	**A**	**191**
13	**IMSA; GTX**	**131**	**(Italy) Vittorio Coggiola**	**(Italy) "Victor" (Italy) Gianni Giudici (Switzerland) Angelo Pallavicini**	**Porsche 935**	?	**185**
13	**IMSA; GTX**	**131**	**(Italy) Vittorio Coggiola**	**(Italy) "Victor" (Italy) Gianni Giudici (Switzerland) Angelo Pallavicini**	**Porsche Type-930 3.2 L Turbo Flat-6**	?	**185**
14	C1	65	(United Kingdom) John Bartlett	(United Kingdom) Roger Anderson (United Kingdom) Steve Kimpton (Morocco) Max Cohen-Olivar	Lola T610	**D**	176
14	C1	65	(United Kingdom) John Bartlett	(United Kingdom) Roger Anderson (United Kingdom) Steve Kimpton (Morocco) Max Cohen-Olivar	Ford Cosworth DFL 3.3 L V8	**D**	176
15	C2	81	(Italy) Jolly Club	(Italy) Almo Coppelli (Italy) Martino Finotto (Italy) Carlo Facetti	Alba AR2	**A**	175
15	C2	81	(Italy) Jolly Club	(Italy) Almo Coppelli (Italy) Martino Finotto (Italy) Carlo Facetti	Giannini Carma FF 1.9 L Turbo I4	**A**	175
16	C2	99	(United Kingdom) J.Q.F. Engineering Ltd.	(United Kingdom) Jeremy Rossiter (United Kingdom) Roy Baker	Tiga GC284	**A**	171
16	C2	99	(United Kingdom) J.Q.F. Engineering Ltd.	(United Kingdom) Jeremy Rossiter (United Kingdom) Roy Baker	Ford Cosworth BDT 1.8 L Turbo I4	**A**	171
17 DSQ^{†}	C2	94	(United Kingdom) Gild Bard Techspeed Racing	(United Kingdom) Steve Thompson (United Kingdom) Tony Lanfranchi (United Kingdom) Divina Galica	Grid S1	**A**	191
17 DSQ^{†}	C2	94	(United Kingdom) Gild Bard Techspeed Racing	(United Kingdom) Steve Thompson (United Kingdom) Tony Lanfranchi (United Kingdom) Divina Galica	Ford Cosworth DFL 3.3 L V8	**A**	191
18 DSQ^{‡}	IMSA; GTP	84	(United Kingdom) Lyncar Motorsport Ltd.	(Greece) Costas Los (New Zealand) John Nicholson	Lyncar MS83	**A**	185
18 DSQ^{‡}	IMSA; GTP	84	(United Kingdom) Lyncar Motorsport Ltd.	(Greece) Costas Los (New Zealand) John Nicholson	Ford Cosworth DFV 3.0 L V8	**A**	185
19 DNF	C2	72	(Germany) Gebhardt Motorsport	(Germany) Jan Thoelke (Germany) Frank Jelinski (United Kingdom) Gerry Amato	Gebhardt JC842	**A**	131
19 DNF	C2	72	(Germany) Gebhardt Motorsport	(Germany) Jan Thoelke (Germany) Frank Jelinski (United Kingdom) Gerry Amato	BMW M12/7 2.0 L I4	**A**	131
20 DNF	B	107	(France) Raymond Boutinaud	(France) Raymond Boutinaud (France) Gerard Brucelle (Germany) Edgar Dören	Porsche 928S	?	123
20 DNF	B	107	(France) Raymond Boutinaud	(France) Raymond Boutinaud (France) Gerard Brucelle (Germany) Edgar Dören	Porsche 4.7 L V8	?	123
21 DNF	IMSA; GTP	88	(United Kingdom) Arthur Hough Pressings (United Kingdom) Ark Racing	(United Kingdom) Max Payne (United Kingdom) Chris Ashmore	Ceekar 83J	**A**	92
21 DNF	IMSA; GTP	88	(United Kingdom) Arthur Hough Pressings (United Kingdom) Ark Racing	(United Kingdom) Max Payne (United Kingdom) Chris Ashmore	Ford Cosworth BDX 2.0 L I4	**A**	92
22 DNF	C1	4	(Italy) Martini Racing	(Italy) Paolo Barilla (France) Bob Wollek	Lancia LC2	**D**	52
22 DNF	C1	4	(Italy) Martini Racing	(Italy) Paolo Barilla (France) Bob Wollek	Ferrari 308C 3.0 L Turbo V8	**D**	52
23 DNF	C1	16	(United Kingdom) Richard Cleare	(United Kingdom) Richard Cleare (United Kingdom) John Cooper (United Kingdom) David Leslie	Porsche-Kremer CK5	?	46
23 DNF	C1	16	(United Kingdom) Richard Cleare	(United Kingdom) Richard Cleare (United Kingdom) John Cooper (United Kingdom) David Leslie	Porsche Type-935 3.0 L Turbo Flat-6	?	46
DNS	C1	6	(Italy) Martini Racing	(Italy) Pierluigi Martini (Italy) Paolo Barilla (France) Bob Wollek	Lancia LC2	**D**	-
DNS	C1	6	(Italy) Martini Racing	(Italy) Pierluigi Martini (Italy) Paolo Barilla (France) Bob Wollek	Ferrari 308C 3.0 L Turbo V8	**D**	-
DNS	C2	73	(Germany) Gebhardt Motorsport	(Germany) Frank Jelinski	Gebhardt JC843	**A**	-
DNS	C2	73	(Germany) Gebhardt Motorsport	(Germany) Frank Jelinski	Ford Cosworth DFV 3.0 L V8	**A**	-
DNS	IMSA; GTP	92	(United Kingdom) Nayler Road & Motorsport	(United Kingdom) Mike Kimpton (United Kingdom) Adrian Hall (United Kingdom) Tim Lee-Davey	Tiga 83TSGT	?	-
DNS	IMSA; GTP	92	(United Kingdom) Nayler Road & Motorsport	(United Kingdom) Mike Kimpton (United Kingdom) Adrian Hall (United Kingdom) Tim Lee-Davey	Hart 420R 2.0 L I4	?	-
DNS	B	106	(Germany) Helmut Gall	(Germany) Helmut Gall (Germany) Kurt König	BMW M1	**D**	-
DNS	B	106	(Germany) Helmut Gall	(Germany) Helmut Gall (Germany) Kurt König	BMW M88/1 3.5 L I6	**D**	-

† - The #94 Gild Bard Techspeed Racing Grid-Ford was disqualified after the race for being pushed across the finish line on the final lap of the race.

‡ - The #84 Lyncar Motorsports Ltd. Lyncar-Ford was disqualified after the race for taking too long to complete the final lap of the race.

== Statistics ==
- Pole Position - #14 GTi Engineering - 1:17.32
- Fastest Lap - #14 GTi Engineering and #4 Martini Racing - 1:21.03
- Average Speed - 175.744 km/h (109.202 mph)

World Sportscar Championship
Previous race: 1984 1000 km of Nürburgring	1984 season	Next race: 1984 1000 km of Mosport
