= 1984 World Sportscar Championship =

Racing tournament

Seasons
- ← 1983 1985 →

The 1984 World Sportscar Championship season was the 32nd season of FIA "World Sportscar Championship" motor racing. It featured the 1984 FIA World Endurance Championship, which was open to FIA Group C1, Group C2 and Group B cars and to IMSA GTP, GTX, GTO and GTU cars. The championship was contested over an eleven race series which ran from 23 April to 2 December 1984.

The World Endurance Championship for Drivers was won by Stefan Bellof, the World Endurance Championship for Manufacturers by Porsche, the Group C2 Prototype FIA Cup by Alba Giannini, and the FIA Grand Touring Cup by BMW.

422 drivers started in at least 1 (one) Grand Prix in the 1984 FIA World Endurance Championship. This high number was largely due to the fact that at several stages (mainly Mosport Park, Fuji, Kyalami and Sandown Park), several competitors were local competitors, who only participated in the stage in their home country.

== Schedule ==
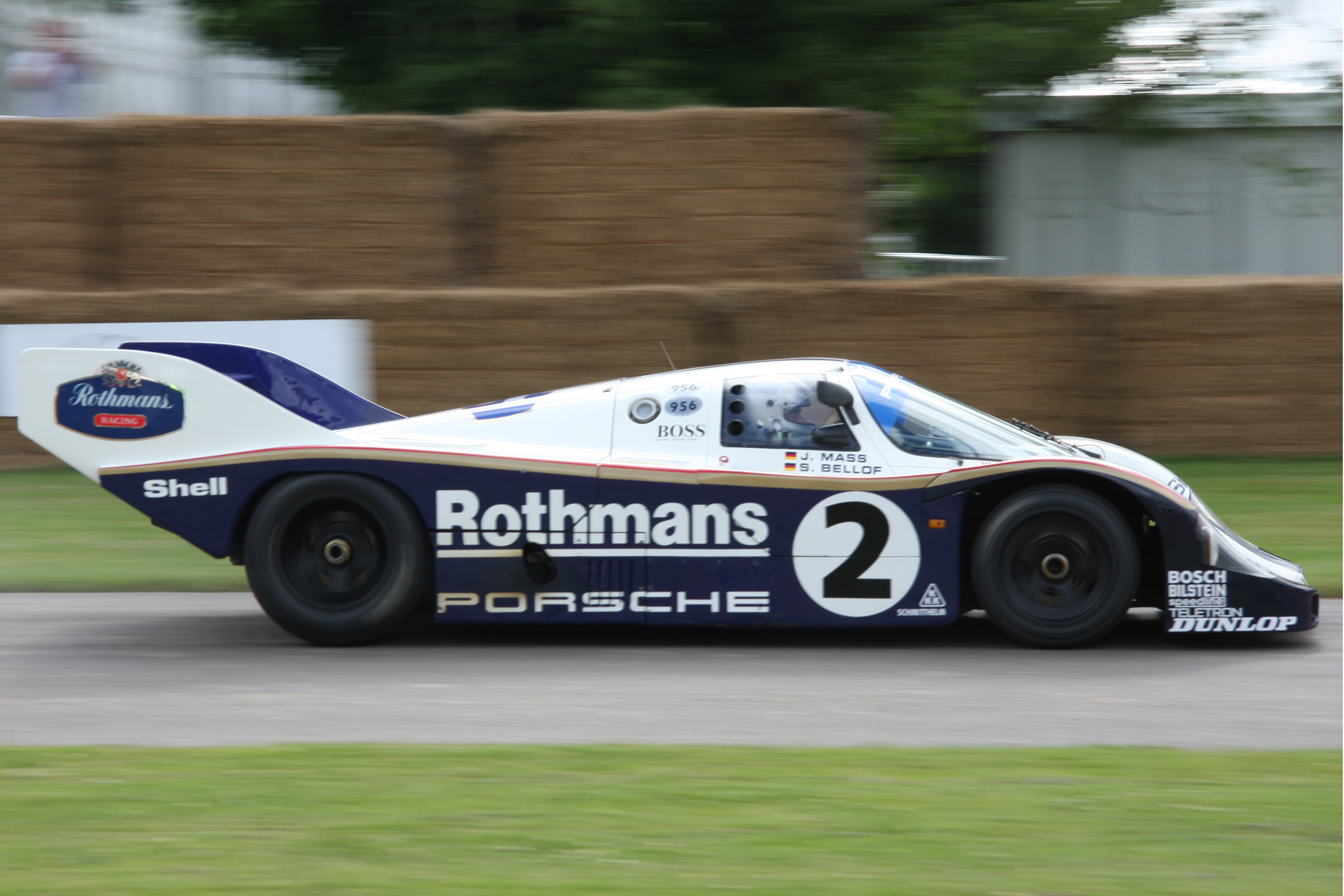
Porsche won the 1984 World Endurance Championship for Manufacturers with its 956s.

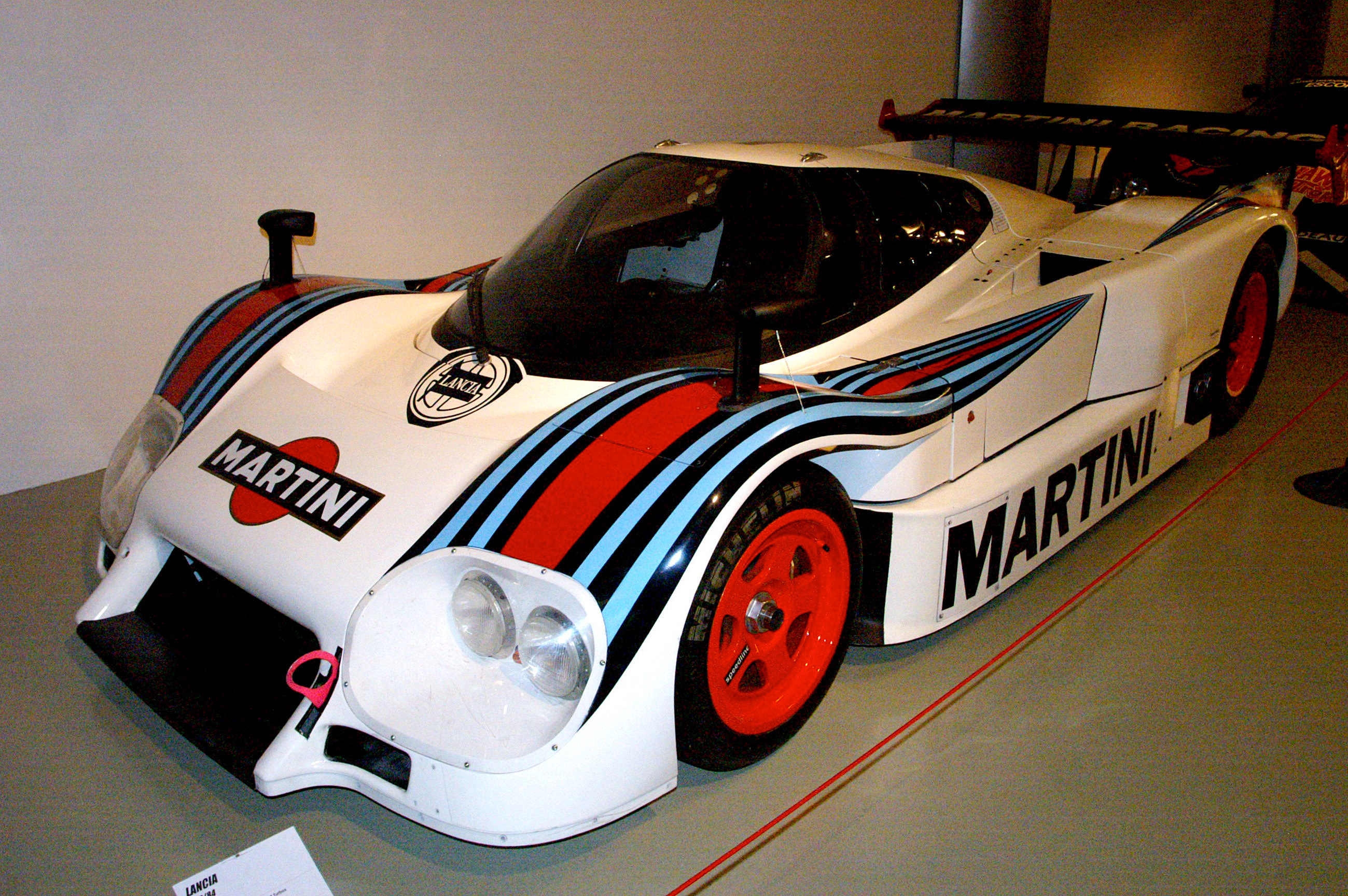
Lancia placed second with its LC2s

The 1984 FIA World Endurance Championship was contested over an eleven race series.

| Rnd | Race | Circuit | Date |
|---|---|---|---|
| 1 | (Italy) Trofeo Filippo Caracciolo (1000km) | Autodromo Nazionale Monza | 23 April |
| 2 | (United Kingdom) Grand Prix International 1000 Kilometres | Silverstone Circuit | 13 May |
| 3 | (France) 24 Hours of Le Mans | Circuit de la Sarthe (Le Mans) | 16 June; 17 June |
| 4 | (Germany) ADAC 1000 Kilometres | Nürburgring | 15 July |
| 5 | (United Kingdom) British Aerospace 1000 Kilometres^{†} | Brands Hatch | 29 July |
| 6 | (Canada) Budweiser GT 1000 Kilometres | Mosport | 5 August |
| 7 | (Belgium) Rothmans Spa 1000 Kilometres | Circuit de Spa-Francorchamps | 2 September |
| 8 | (Italy) 1000 Kilometres di Imola^{†} | Autodromo Dino Ferrari | 16 September |
| 9 | (Japan) Mount Fuji 1000 Kilometres | Fuji Speedway | 30 September |
| 10 | (South Africa) Kyalami 1000 Kilometres | Kyalami | 3 November |
| 11 | (Australia) Sandown 1000^{†} | Sandown Park | 2 December |

† - The races at Brands Hatch, Imola and Sandown Park were qualifying rounds for the World Endurance Championship for Drivers but not for the three manufacturers awards.

== Entries ==
=== Group C ===
| Entrant | Car | Engine | Tyre | No. | Drivers | Rounds |
|---|---|---|---|---|---|---|
| (West Germany) Rothmans Porsche | Porsche 956 | Porsche Type-935/76 2.6 L Turbo Flat-6 | D | 1 | (Belgium) Jacky Ickx | 1–2, 4, 6–9, 11 |
| (West Germany) Rothmans Porsche | Porsche 956 | Porsche Type-935/76 2.6 L Turbo Flat-6 | D | 1 | (West Germany) Jochen Mass | 1–2, 4, 6–7, 9, 11 |
| (West Germany) Rothmans Porsche | Porsche 956 | Porsche Type-935/76 2.6 L Turbo Flat-6 | D | 1 | (United Kingdom) John Watson | 8 |
| (West Germany) Rothmans Porsche | Porsche 956 | Porsche Type-935/76 2.6 L Turbo Flat-6 | D | 2 | (West Germany) Stefan Bellof | 1–2, 4, 6–7, 9, 11 |
| (West Germany) Rothmans Porsche | Porsche 956 | Porsche Type-935/76 2.6 L Turbo Flat-6 | D | 2 | (United Kingdom) Derek Bell | 1–2, 4, 6–7, 11 |
| (West Germany) Rothmans Porsche | Porsche 956 | Porsche Type-935/76 2.6 L Turbo Flat-6 | D | 2 | (United Kingdom) John Watson | 9 |
| (West Germany) Rothmans Porsche | Porsche 956 | Porsche Type-935/76 2.6 L Turbo Flat-6 | D | 3 | (Australia) Vern Schuppan | 6–7, 11 |
| (West Germany) Rothmans Porsche | Porsche 956 | Porsche Type-935/76 2.6 L Turbo Flat-6 | D | 3 | (United Kingdom) Nick Mason | 6 |
| (West Germany) Rothmans Porsche | Porsche 956 | Porsche Type-935/76 2.6 L Turbo Flat-6 | D | 3 | (United Kingdom) John Watson | 7 |
| (West Germany) Rothmans Porsche | Porsche 956 | Porsche Type-935/76 2.6 L Turbo Flat-6 | D | 3 | (United Kingdom) Richard Lloyd | 9 |
| (West Germany) Rothmans Porsche | Porsche 956 | Porsche Type-935/76 2.6 L Turbo Flat-6 | D | 3 | (Australia) Alan Jones | 11 |
| (West Germany) Rothmans Porsche | Porsche 956 | Porsche Type-935/76 2.6 L Turbo Flat-6 | D | 56 | (United Kingdom) Johnny Dumfries | 11 |
| (West Germany) Rothmans Porsche | Porsche 956 | Porsche Type-935/76 2.6 L Turbo Flat-6 | D | 56 | (Australia) Jack Brabham | 11 |
| (West Germany) Rothmans Porsche | Porsche 956 | Porsche Type-935/76 2.6 L Turbo Flat-6 | D | 56 | (United Kingdom) Richard Lloyd | 11 |
| (Italy) Martini Racing | Lancia LC2/84 | Ferrari 268C 2.6 L Turbo V8; Ferrari 308C 3.0 L Turbo V8 | D | 4 | (France) Bob Wollek | 1–5, 8 |
| (Italy) Martini Racing | Lancia LC2/84 | Ferrari 268C 2.6 L Turbo V8; Ferrari 308C 3.0 L Turbo V8 | D | 4 | (Italy) Riccardo Patrese | 1–2, 4, 8, 10 |
| (Italy) Martini Racing | Lancia LC2/84 | Ferrari 268C 2.6 L Turbo V8; Ferrari 308C 3.0 L Turbo V8 | D | 4 | (Italy) Alessandro Nannini | 3, 8, 10 |
| (Italy) Martini Racing | Lancia LC2/84 | Ferrari 268C 2.6 L Turbo V8; Ferrari 308C 3.0 L Turbo V8 | D | 4 | (Italy) Paolo Barilla | 5, 8 |
| (Italy) Martini Racing | Lancia LC2/84 | Ferrari 268C 2.6 L Turbo V8; Ferrari 308C 3.0 L Turbo V8 | D | 5 | (Italy) Paolo Barilla | 1–4, 8, 11 |
| (Italy) Martini Racing | Lancia LC2/84 | Ferrari 268C 2.6 L Turbo V8; Ferrari 308C 3.0 L Turbo V8 | D | 5 | (Italy) Mauro Baldi | 1–3, 5 |
| (Italy) Martini Racing | Lancia LC2/84 | Ferrari 268C 2.6 L Turbo V8; Ferrari 308C 3.0 L Turbo V8 | D | 5 | (West Germany) Hans Heyer | 3 |
| (Italy) Martini Racing | Lancia LC2/84 | Ferrari 268C 2.6 L Turbo V8; Ferrari 308C 3.0 L Turbo V8 | D | 5 | (Italy) Alessandro Nannini | 4, 8 |
| (Italy) Martini Racing | Lancia LC2/84 | Ferrari 268C 2.6 L Turbo V8; Ferrari 308C 3.0 L Turbo V8 | D | 5 | (Italy) Pierluigi Martini | 5 |
| (Italy) Martini Racing | Lancia LC2/84 | Ferrari 268C 2.6 L Turbo V8; Ferrari 308C 3.0 L Turbo V8 | D | 5 | (France) Bob Wollek | 5, 10 |
| (Italy) Jolly Club (France) BP Résidences Malardeau (Italy) Martini Racing | Lancia LC2/84 | Ferrari 268C 2.6 L Turbo V8; Ferrari 308C 3.0 L Turbo V8 | D | 6 | (Italy) Pierluigi Martini | 1–3, 5 |
| (Italy) Jolly Club (France) BP Résidences Malardeau (Italy) Martini Racing | Lancia LC2/84 | Ferrari 268C 2.6 L Turbo V8; Ferrari 308C 3.0 L Turbo V8 | D | 6 | (Italy) Beppe Gabbiani | 1–3 |
| (Italy) Jolly Club (France) BP Résidences Malardeau (Italy) Martini Racing | Lancia LC2/84 | Ferrari 268C 2.6 L Turbo V8; Ferrari 308C 3.0 L Turbo V8 | D | 6 | (France) Xavier Lapeyre | 3 |
| (Italy) Jolly Club (France) BP Résidences Malardeau (Italy) Martini Racing | Lancia LC2/84 | Ferrari 268C 2.6 L Turbo V8; Ferrari 308C 3.0 L Turbo V8 | D | 6 | (France) Bob Wollek | 5, 8 |
| (Italy) Jolly Club (France) BP Résidences Malardeau (Italy) Martini Racing | Lancia LC2/84 | Ferrari 268C 2.6 L Turbo V8; Ferrari 308C 3.0 L Turbo V8 | D | 6 | (Italy) Paolo Barilla | 5 |
| (Italy) Jolly Club (France) BP Résidences Malardeau (Italy) Martini Racing | Lancia LC2/84 | Ferrari 268C 2.6 L Turbo V8; Ferrari 308C 3.0 L Turbo V8 | D | 6 | (Italy) Riccardo Patrese | 8 |
| (Italy) Jolly Club (France) BP Résidences Malardeau (Italy) Martini Racing | Lancia LC2/84 | Ferrari 268C 2.6 L Turbo V8; Ferrari 308C 3.0 L Turbo V8 | D | 29 | (Italy) Mauro Baldi | 8 |
| (Italy) Jolly Club (France) BP Résidences Malardeau (Italy) Martini Racing | Lancia LC2/84 | Ferrari 268C 2.6 L Turbo V8; Ferrari 308C 3.0 L Turbo V8 | D | 29 | (Italy) Pierluigi Martini | 8 |
| (West Germany) New-Man Joest Racing | Porsche 956B | Porsche Type-935/76 2.6 L Turbo Flat-6 | D | 7 | (France) Henri Pescarolo | 1–4, 7, 9, 11 |
| (West Germany) New-Man Joest Racing | Porsche 956B | Porsche Type-935/76 2.6 L Turbo Flat-6 | D | 7 | (West Germany) Klaus Ludwig | 1–3, 11 |
| (West Germany) New-Man Joest Racing | Porsche 956B | Porsche Type-935/76 2.6 L Turbo Flat-6 | D | 7 | (Sweden) Stefan Johansson | 1, 3–4, 7, 9 |
| (West Germany) New-Man Joest Racing | Porsche 956B | Porsche Type-935/76 2.6 L Turbo Flat-6 | D | 7 | (Brazil) Ayrton Senna | 4 |
| (West Germany) New-Man Joest Racing | Porsche 956B | Porsche Type-935/76 2.6 L Turbo Flat-6 | D | 7 | (West Germany) Hans Heyer | 7 |
| (West Germany) New-Man Joest Racing | Porsche 956B | Porsche Type-935/76 2.6 L Turbo Flat-6 | D | 8 | (Sweden) Stefan Johansson | 3, 5 |
| (West Germany) New-Man Joest Racing | Porsche 956B | Porsche Type-935/76 2.6 L Turbo Flat-6 | D | 8 | (France) Jean-Louis Schlesser | 3 |
| (West Germany) New-Man Joest Racing | Porsche 956B | Porsche Type-935/76 2.6 L Turbo Flat-6 | D | 8 | (Colombia) Mauricio de Narváez | 3 |
| (West Germany) New-Man Joest Racing | Porsche 956B | Porsche Type-935/76 2.6 L Turbo Flat-6 | D | 8 | (West Germany) Jochen Mass | 5, 8 |
| (West Germany) New-Man Joest Racing | Porsche 956B | Porsche Type-935/76 2.6 L Turbo Flat-6 | D | 8 | (France) Henri Pescarolo | 5, 8 |
| (West Germany) New-Man Joest Racing | Porsche 956B | Porsche Type-935/76 2.6 L Turbo Flat-6 | D | 8 | (West Germany) Hans Heyer | 8 |
| (West Germany) Schornstein Racing Team | Porsche 956B | Porsche Type-935/76 2.6 L Turbo Flat-6 | D | 12 | (West Germany) Dieter Schornstein | 1–5, 7–8, 10–11 |
| (West Germany) Schornstein Racing Team | Porsche 956B | Porsche Type-935/76 2.6 L Turbo Flat-6 | D | 12 | (West Germany) Volkert Merl | 1–5 |
| (West Germany) Schornstein Racing Team | Porsche 956B | Porsche Type-935/76 2.6 L Turbo Flat-6 | D | 12 | (West Germany) "John Winter" | 2–5, 7–8, 10–11 |
| (West Germany) Schornstein Racing Team | Porsche 956B | Porsche Type-935/76 2.6 L Turbo Flat-6 | D | 12 | (West Germany) Hans Heyer | 7–8 |
| (West Germany) Schornstein Racing Team | Porsche 956B | Porsche Type-935/76 2.6 L Turbo Flat-6 | D | 12 | (France) Henri Pescarolo | 10 |
| (West Germany) Schornstein Racing Team | Porsche 956B | Porsche Type-935/76 2.6 L Turbo Flat-6 | D | 12 | (France) Paul Belmondo | 11 |
| (Switzerland) Brun Motorsport | Porsche 956 | Porsche Type-935/76 2.6 L Turbo Flat-6 | D | 9 | (Argentina) Oscar Larrauri | 1–2, 8 |
| (Switzerland) Brun Motorsport | Porsche 956 | Porsche Type-935/76 2.6 L Turbo Flat-6 | D | 9 | (Italy) Massimo Sigala | 1–2, 8 |
| (Switzerland) Brun Motorsport | Porsche 956 | Porsche Type-935/76 2.6 L Turbo Flat-6 | D | 9 | (Switzerland) Walter Brun | 3, 5, 7 |
| (Switzerland) Brun Motorsport | Porsche 956 | Porsche Type-935/76 2.6 L Turbo Flat-6 | D | 9 | (West Germany) Leopold von Bavaria | 3, 5 |
| (Switzerland) Brun Motorsport | Porsche 956 | Porsche Type-935/76 2.6 L Turbo Flat-6 | D | 9 | (United States) Bob Akin | 3 |
| (Switzerland) Brun Motorsport | Porsche 956 | Porsche Type-935/76 2.6 L Turbo Flat-6 | D | 9 | (West Germany) Harald Grohs | 4–5, 7 |
| (Switzerland) Brun Motorsport | Porsche 956 | Porsche Type-935/76 2.6 L Turbo Flat-6 | D | 9 | (West Germany) Hans-Joachim Stuck | 4, 7 |
| (Switzerland) Brun Motorsport | Porsche 956 | Porsche Type-935/76 2.6 L Turbo Flat-6 | D | 9 | (West Germany) Stefan Bellof | 5, 8 |
| (Switzerland) Brun Motorsport | Porsche 956 | Porsche Type-935/76 2.6 L Turbo Flat-6 | D | 19 | (Switzerland) Walter Brun | 1–2, 6 |
| (Switzerland) Brun Motorsport | Porsche 956 | Porsche Type-935/76 2.6 L Turbo Flat-6 | D | 19 | (West Germany) Harald Grohs | 1, 5 |
| (Switzerland) Brun Motorsport | Porsche 956 | Porsche Type-935/76 2.6 L Turbo Flat-6 | D | 19 | (West Germany) Hans-Joachim Stuck | 1, 8 |
| (Switzerland) Brun Motorsport | Porsche 956 | Porsche Type-935/76 2.6 L Turbo Flat-6 | D | 19 | (Australia) Vern Schuppan | 2 |
| (Switzerland) Brun Motorsport | Porsche 956 | Porsche Type-935/76 2.6 L Turbo Flat-6 | D | 19 | (Argentina) Oscar Larrauri | 4, 6 |
| (Switzerland) Brun Motorsport | Porsche 956 | Porsche Type-935/76 2.6 L Turbo Flat-6 | D | 19 | (Italy) Massimo Sigala | 4 |
| (Switzerland) Brun Motorsport | Porsche 956 | Porsche Type-935/76 2.6 L Turbo Flat-6 | D | 19 | (Belgium) Stefan Bellof | 5, 8 |
| (Switzerland) Brun Motorsport | Porsche 956 | Porsche Type-935/76 2.6 L Turbo Flat-6 | D | 20 | (Argentina) Oscar Larrauri | 3, 7 |
| (Switzerland) Brun Motorsport | Porsche 956 | Porsche Type-935/76 2.6 L Turbo Flat-6 | D | 20 | (Italy) Massimo Sigala | 3, 7 |
| (Switzerland) Brun Motorsport | Porsche 956 | Porsche Type-935/76 2.6 L Turbo Flat-6 | D | 20 | (France) Joël Gouhier | 3 |
| (Switzerland) Brun Motorsport | Porsche 956 | Porsche Type-935/76 2.6 L Turbo Flat-6 | D | 20 | (Switzerland) Walter Brun | 4 |
| (Switzerland) Brun Motorsport | Porsche 956 | Porsche Type-935/76 2.6 L Turbo Flat-6 | D | 20 | (West Germany) Leopold von Bavaria | 4 |
| (West Germany) Porsche Kremer Racing | Porsche 956B; Kremer CK5 | Porsche Type-935/76 2.6 L Turbo Flat-6; Porsche Type-935 3.0 L Turbo Flat-6 | D G | 10 | (West Germany) Manfred Winkelhock | 4, 9 |
| (West Germany) Porsche Kremer Racing | Porsche 956B; Kremer CK5 | Porsche Type-935/76 2.6 L Turbo Flat-6; Porsche Type-935 3.0 L Turbo Flat-6 | D G | 10 | (Switzerland) Marc Surer | 4 |
| (West Germany) Porsche Kremer Racing | Porsche 956B; Kremer CK5 | Porsche Type-935/76 2.6 L Turbo Flat-6; Porsche Type-935 3.0 L Turbo Flat-6 | D G | 10 | (South Africa) George Fouché | 5, 7–8, 11 |
| (West Germany) Porsche Kremer Racing | Porsche 956B; Kremer CK5 | Porsche Type-935/76 2.6 L Turbo Flat-6; Porsche Type-935 3.0 L Turbo Flat-6 | D G | 10 | (United Kingdom) David Sutherland | 5 |
| (West Germany) Porsche Kremer Racing | Porsche 956B; Kremer CK5 | Porsche Type-935/76 2.6 L Turbo Flat-6; Porsche Type-935 3.0 L Turbo Flat-6 | D G | 10 | (South Africa) Desiré Wilson | 5 |
| (West Germany) Porsche Kremer Racing | Porsche 956B; Kremer CK5 | Porsche Type-935/76 2.6 L Turbo Flat-6; Porsche Type-935 3.0 L Turbo Flat-6 | D G | 10 | (Netherlands) Kees Kroesemeijer | 7 |
| (West Germany) Porsche Kremer Racing | Porsche 956B; Kremer CK5 | Porsche Type-935/76 2.6 L Turbo Flat-6; Porsche Type-935 3.0 L Turbo Flat-6 | D G | 10 | (Switzerland) Walter Brun | 8 |
| (West Germany) Porsche Kremer Racing | Porsche 956B; Kremer CK5 | Porsche Type-935/76 2.6 L Turbo Flat-6; Porsche Type-935 3.0 L Turbo Flat-6 | D G | 10 | (West Germany) Leopold von Bavaria | 8 |
| (West Germany) Porsche Kremer Racing | Porsche 956B; Kremer CK5 | Porsche Type-935/76 2.6 L Turbo Flat-6; Porsche Type-935 3.0 L Turbo Flat-6 | D G | 10 | (New Zealand) Mike Thackwell | 9 |
| (West Germany) Porsche Kremer Racing | Porsche 956B; Kremer CK5 | Porsche Type-935/76 2.6 L Turbo Flat-6; Porsche Type-935 3.0 L Turbo Flat-6 | D G | 10 | (South Africa) Sarel van der Merwe | 11 |
| (West Germany) Porsche Kremer Racing | Porsche 956B; Kremer CK5 | Porsche Type-935/76 2.6 L Turbo Flat-6; Porsche Type-935 3.0 L Turbo Flat-6 | D G | 11 | (United Kingdom) David Sutherland | 2 |
| (West Germany) Porsche Kremer Racing | Porsche 956B; Kremer CK5 | Porsche Type-935/76 2.6 L Turbo Flat-6; Porsche Type-935 3.0 L Turbo Flat-6 | D G | 11 | (Austria) Franz Konrad | 2 |
| (West Germany) Porsche Kremer Racing | Porsche 956B; Kremer CK5 | Porsche Type-935/76 2.6 L Turbo Flat-6; Porsche Type-935 3.0 L Turbo Flat-6 | D G | 11 | (Australia) Vern Schuppan | 3 |
| (West Germany) Porsche Kremer Racing | Porsche 956B; Kremer CK5 | Porsche Type-935/76 2.6 L Turbo Flat-6; Porsche Type-935 3.0 L Turbo Flat-6 | D G | 11 | (Australia) Alan Jones | 3 |
| (West Germany) Porsche Kremer Racing | Porsche 956B; Kremer CK5 | Porsche Type-935/76 2.6 L Turbo Flat-6; Porsche Type-935 3.0 L Turbo Flat-6 | D G | 11 | (France) Jean-Pierre Jarier | 3 |
| (West Germany) Porsche Kremer Racing | Porsche 956B; Kremer CK5 | Porsche Type-935/76 2.6 L Turbo Flat-6; Porsche Type-935 3.0 L Turbo Flat-6 | D G | 11 | (South Africa) George Fouché | 4 |
| (West Germany) Porsche Kremer Racing | Porsche 956B; Kremer CK5 | Porsche Type-935/76 2.6 L Turbo Flat-6; Porsche Type-935 3.0 L Turbo Flat-6 | D G | 11 | (Netherlands) Kees Kroesemeijer | 4 |
| (West Germany) Porsche Kremer Racing | Porsche 956B; Kremer CK5 | Porsche Type-935/76 2.6 L Turbo Flat-6; Porsche Type-935 3.0 L Turbo Flat-6 | D G | 11 | (West Germany) Manfred Winkelhock | 11 |
| (West Germany) Porsche Kremer Racing | Porsche 956B; Kremer CK5 | Porsche Type-935/76 2.6 L Turbo Flat-6; Porsche Type-935 3.0 L Turbo Flat-6 | D G | 11 | (Australia) Rusty French | 11 |
| (West Germany) Porsche Kremer Racing | Porsche 956B; Kremer CK5 | Porsche Type-935/76 2.6 L Turbo Flat-6; Porsche Type-935 3.0 L Turbo Flat-6 | D G | 17 | (United Kingdom) Tiff Needell | 3 |
| (West Germany) Porsche Kremer Racing | Porsche 956B; Kremer CK5 | Porsche Type-935/76 2.6 L Turbo Flat-6; Porsche Type-935 3.0 L Turbo Flat-6 | D G | 17 | (United Kingdom) David Sutherland | 3 |
| (West Germany) Porsche Kremer Racing | Porsche 956B; Kremer CK5 | Porsche Type-935/76 2.6 L Turbo Flat-6; Porsche Type-935 3.0 L Turbo Flat-6 | D G | 17 | (Australia) Rusty French | 3 |
| (West Germany) Porsche Kremer Racing | Porsche 956B; Kremer CK5 | Porsche Type-935/76 2.6 L Turbo Flat-6; Porsche Type-935 3.0 L Turbo Flat-6 | D G | 17 | (Netherlands) Kees Kroesemeijer | 11 |
| (West Germany) Porsche Kremer Racing | Porsche 956B; Kremer CK5 | Porsche Type-935/76 2.6 L Turbo Flat-6; Porsche Type-935 3.0 L Turbo Flat-6 | D G | 17 | (Spain) Jésus Pareja | 11 |
| (West Germany) Porsche Kremer Racing | Porsche 956B; Kremer CK5 | Porsche Type-935/76 2.6 L Turbo Flat-6; Porsche Type-935 3.0 L Turbo Flat-6 | D G | 17 | (New Zealand) Peter Janson | 11 |
| (West Germany) Porsche Kremer Racing | Porsche 956B; Kremer CK5 | Porsche Type-935/76 2.6 L Turbo Flat-6; Porsche Type-935 3.0 L Turbo Flat-6 | D G | 20 | (Canada) Kees Nierop | 6 |
| (West Germany) Porsche Kremer Racing | Porsche 956B; Kremer CK5 | Porsche Type-935/76 2.6 L Turbo Flat-6; Porsche Type-935 3.0 L Turbo Flat-6 | D G | 20 | (Canada) Bill Adam | 6 |
| (West Germany) Porsche Kremer Racing | Porsche 956B; Kremer CK5 | Porsche Type-935/76 2.6 L Turbo Flat-6; Porsche Type-935 3.0 L Turbo Flat-6 | D G | 20 | (South Africa) George Fouché | 6 |
| (France) Primagaz Team Cougar | Cougar C01B | Ford Cosworth DFL 3.3 L V8 | M | 13 | (France) Yves Courage | 1–3 |
| (France) Primagaz Team Cougar | Cougar C01B | Ford Cosworth DFL 3.3 L V8 | M | 13 | (United Kingdom) Alain de Cadenet | 1–2 |
| (France) Primagaz Team Cougar | Cougar C01B | Ford Cosworth DFL 3.3 L V8 | M | 13 | (Italy) Gianni Guidici | 1 |
| (France) Primagaz Team Cougar | Cougar C01B | Ford Cosworth DFL 3.3 L V8 | M | 13 | (France) Michel Dubois | 3 |
| (France) Primagaz Team Cougar | Cougar C01B | Ford Cosworth DFL 3.3 L V8 | M | 13 | (United States) John Jellinek | 3 |
| (United Kingdom) GTI Engineering | Porsche 956 | Porsche Type-935/76 2.6 L Turbo Flat-6 | D | 14 | (United Kingdom) Jonathan Palmer | 1–5, 7–9, 11 |
| (United Kingdom) GTI Engineering | Porsche 956 | Porsche Type-935/76 2.6 L Turbo Flat-6 | D | 14 | (Netherlands) Jan Lammers | 1–5, 7–9, 11 |
| (United Kingdom) GTI Engineering | Porsche 956 | Porsche Type-935/76 2.6 L Turbo Flat-6 | D | 14 | (West Germany) Christian Danner | 4 |
| (United Kingdom) GTI Engineering | Porsche 956 | Porsche Type-935/76 2.6 L Turbo Flat-6 | D | 16 | (United Kingdom) Richard Lloyd | 2–3, 7 |
| (United Kingdom) GTI Engineering | Porsche 956 | Porsche Type-935/76 2.6 L Turbo Flat-6 | D | 16 | (United Kingdom) Nick Mason | 2–3 |
| (United Kingdom) GTI Engineering | Porsche 956 | Porsche Type-935/76 2.6 L Turbo Flat-6 | D | 16 | (France) René Metge | 3 |
| (United Kingdom) GTI Engineering | Porsche 956 | Porsche Type-935/76 2.6 L Turbo Flat-6 | D | 16 | (Australia) Vern Schuppan | 4 |
| (United Kingdom) GTI Engineering | Porsche 956 | Porsche Type-935/76 2.6 L Turbo Flat-6 | D | 16 | (West Germany) Christian Danner | 4 |
| (United Kingdom) GTI Engineering | Porsche 956 | Porsche Type-935/76 2.6 L Turbo Flat-6 | D | 16 | (United Kingdom) Johnny Dumfries | 7 |
| (Japan) Nova Engineering | Porsche 956 | Porsche Type-935/76 2.6 L Turbo Flat-6 | D | 16 | (Japan) Jirou Yoneyama | 9 |
| (Japan) Nova Engineering | Porsche 956 | Porsche Type-935/76 2.6 L Turbo Flat-6 | D | 16 | (Japan) Chikage Oguchi | 9 |
| (Japan) Nova Engineering | Porsche 956 | Porsche Type-935/76 2.6 L Turbo Flat-6 | B | 18 | (Japan) Kenji Takahashi | 9 |
| (Japan) Nova Engineering | Porsche 956 | Porsche Type-935/76 2.6 L Turbo Flat-6 | B | 18 | (Japan) Kunimitsu Takahashi | 9 |
| (Japan) Nova Engineering | Porsche 956 | Porsche Type-935/76 2.6 L Turbo Flat-6 | B | 18 | (United Kingdom) Geoff Lees | 9 |
| (Japan) Mazdaspeed | March 84G | Mazda 13B 1.3 L Turbo 2-Rotor | B | 17 | (Japan) Takashi Yorino | 9 |
| (Japan) Mazdaspeed | March 84G | Mazda 13B 1.3 L Turbo 2-Rotor | B | 17 | (Japan) Yoshimi Katayama | 9 |
| (West Germany) Obermaier Racing | Porsche 956 | Porsche Type-935/76 2.6 L Turbo Flat-6 | D G | 18 | (West Germany) Jürgen Lässig | 2, 4, 7–8 |
| (West Germany) Obermaier Racing | Porsche 956 | Porsche Type-935/76 2.6 L Turbo Flat-6 | D G | 18 | (Belgium) Hervé Regout | 2, 7–8 |
| (West Germany) Obermaier Racing | Porsche 956 | Porsche Type-935/76 2.6 L Turbo Flat-6 | D G | 18 | (South Africa) George Fouché | 2 |
| (West Germany) Obermaier Racing | Porsche 956 | Porsche Type-935/76 2.6 L Turbo Flat-6 | D G | 18 | (United Kingdom) David Sutherland | 4 |
| (West Germany) Obermaier Racing | Porsche 956 | Porsche Type-935/76 2.6 L Turbo Flat-6 | D G | 18 | (New Zealand) Mike Thackwell | 4 |
| (West Germany) Obermaier Racing | Porsche 956 | Porsche Type-935/76 2.6 L Turbo Flat-6 | D G | 18 | (Belgium) Philippe Martin | 7 |
| (West Germany) Obermaier Racing | Porsche 956 | Porsche Type-935/76 2.6 L Turbo Flat-6 | D G | 18 | (West Germany) Harald Grohs | 8 |
| (West Germany) Obermaier Racing | Porsche 956 | Porsche Type-935/76 2.6 L Turbo Flat-6 | D G | 47 | (West Germany) Jürgen Lässig | 1, 3 |
| (West Germany) Obermaier Racing | Porsche 956 | Porsche Type-935/76 2.6 L Turbo Flat-6 | D G | 47 | (South Africa) George Fouché | 1, 3 |
| (West Germany) Obermaier Racing | Porsche 956 | Porsche Type-935/76 2.6 L Turbo Flat-6 | D G | 47 | (West Germany) Axel Plankenhorn | 1 |
| (West Germany) Obermaier Racing | Porsche 956 | Porsche Type-935/76 2.6 L Turbo Flat-6 | D G | 47 | (Canada) John Graham | 3 |
| (Japan) Central 20 Racing Team | LM 03C | Nissan LZ20 2.1 L Turbo I4 | D | 20 | (Japan) Takao Wada | 9 |
| (Japan) Central 20 Racing Team | LM 03C | Nissan LZ20 2.1 L Turbo I4 | D | 20 | (Japan) Haruhito Yanagida | 9 |
| (United Kingdom) Charles Ivey Racing | Grid S2; Porsche 956 | Porsche Type-930/72 3.0 L Turbo Flat-6; Porsche Type-935/76 2.6 L Turbo Flat-6 | A D | 21 | (United Kingdom) Dudley Wood | 1–2, 5–6 |
| (United Kingdom) Charles Ivey Racing | Grid S2; Porsche 956 | Porsche Type-930/72 3.0 L Turbo Flat-6; Porsche Type-935/76 2.6 L Turbo Flat-6 | A D | 21 | (United Kingdom) John Cooper | 1–2 |
| (United Kingdom) Charles Ivey Racing | Grid S2; Porsche 956 | Porsche Type-930/72 3.0 L Turbo Flat-6; Porsche Type-935/76 2.6 L Turbo Flat-6 | A D | 21 | (United Kingdom) Barry Robinson | 2, 5–6 |
| (United Kingdom) Charles Ivey Racing | Grid S2; Porsche 956 | Porsche Type-930/72 3.0 L Turbo Flat-6; Porsche Type-935/76 2.6 L Turbo Flat-6 | A D | 21 | (United Kingdom) Alain de Cadenet | 3 |
| (United Kingdom) Charles Ivey Racing | Grid S2; Porsche 956 | Porsche Type-930/72 3.0 L Turbo Flat-6; Porsche Type-935/76 2.6 L Turbo Flat-6 | A D | 21 | (United Kingdom) Chris Craft | 3 |
| (United Kingdom) Charles Ivey Racing | Grid S2; Porsche 956 | Porsche Type-930/72 3.0 L Turbo Flat-6; Porsche Type-935/76 2.6 L Turbo Flat-6 | A D | 21 | (Australia) Allan Grice | 3 |
| (United Kingdom) Charles Ivey Racing | Grid S2; Porsche 956 | Porsche Type-930/72 3.0 L Turbo Flat-6; Porsche Type-935/76 2.6 L Turbo Flat-6 | A D | 21 | (United Kingdom) Paul Smith | 5 |
| (United Kingdom) Charles Ivey Racing | Grid S2; Porsche 956 | Porsche Type-930/72 3.0 L Turbo Flat-6; Porsche Type-935/76 2.6 L Turbo Flat-6 | A D | 21 | (South Africa) George Fouché | 5 |
| (United Kingdom) Charles Ivey Racing | Grid S2; Porsche 956 | Porsche Type-930/72 3.0 L Turbo Flat-6; Porsche Type-935/76 2.6 L Turbo Flat-6 | A D | 25 | (United Kingdom) Dudley Wood | 3 |
| (United Kingdom) Charles Ivey Racing | Grid S2; Porsche 956 | Porsche Type-930/72 3.0 L Turbo Flat-6; Porsche Type-935/76 2.6 L Turbo Flat-6 | A D | 25 | (United Kingdom) John Cooper | 3 |
| (United Kingdom) Charles Ivey Racing | Grid S2; Porsche 956 | Porsche Type-930/72 3.0 L Turbo Flat-6; Porsche Type-935/76 2.6 L Turbo Flat-6 | A D | 25 | (United Kingdom) Barry Robinson | 3 |
| (France) Secateva | WM P83B | Peugeot ZNS4 2.8 L Turbo V6 | M | 23 | (France) Alain Couderc | 3 |
| (France) Secateva | WM P83B | Peugeot ZNS4 2.8 L Turbo V6 | M | 23 | (France) Gérard Patté | 3 |
| (France) Secateva | WM P83B | Peugeot ZNS4 2.8 L Turbo V6 | M | 23 | (France) Roger Dorchy | 3 |
| (France) Secateva | WM P83B | Peugeot ZNS4 2.8 L Turbo V6 | M | 24 | (France) Michel Prignard | 3 |
| (France) Secateva | WM P83B | Peugeot ZNS4 2.8 L Turbo V6 | M | 24 | (France) Jean-Daniel Raulet | 3 |
| (France) Secateva | WM P83B | Peugeot ZNS4 2.8 L Turbo V6 | M | 24 | (France) Pascal Pessiot | 3 |
| (United States) Henn's T-Bird Swap Shop | Porsche 956; Porsche 962 | Porsche Type-935/76 2.6 L Turbo Flat-6 | G | 26 | (France) Jean Rondeau | 3 |
| (United States) Henn's T-Bird Swap Shop | Porsche 956; Porsche 962 | Porsche Type-935/76 2.6 L Turbo Flat-6 | G | 26 | (United States) John Paul Jr. | 3 |
| (United States) Henn's T-Bird Swap Shop | Porsche 956; Porsche 962 | Porsche Type-935/76 2.6 L Turbo Flat-6 | G | 61 | (United States) Preston Henn | 3 |
| (United States) Henn's T-Bird Swap Shop | Porsche 956; Porsche 962 | Porsche Type-935/76 2.6 L Turbo Flat-6 | G | 61 | (West Germany) Edgar Dören | 3 |
| (United States) Henn's T-Bird Swap Shop | Porsche 956; Porsche 962 | Porsche Type-935/76 2.6 L Turbo Flat-6 | G | 61 | (France) Michel Ferté | 3 |
| Panasport Japan | LM 04C | Nissan LZ20B 2.1 L Turbo I4 | B | 26 | (Japan) Toshio Suzuki | 9 |
| Panasport Japan | LM 04C | Nissan LZ20B 2.1 L Turbo I4 | B | 26 | (Japan) Osamu Nakako | 9 |
| (Japan) Dome Motorsport | Dome RC83i; Dome RC84 | Ford Cosworth DFL 3.3 L V8; Toyota 4T-GT 2.1 L Turbo I4 | D | 29 | (Japan) Toshio Suzuki | 9 |
| (Japan) Dome Motorsport | Dome RC83i; Dome RC84 | Ford Cosworth DFL 3.3 L V8; Toyota 4T-GT 2.1 L Turbo I4 | D | 29 | (United Kingdom) Rupert Keegan | 9 |
| (Japan) Dome Motorsport | Dome RC83i; Dome RC84 | Ford Cosworth DFL 3.3 L V8; Toyota 4T-GT 2.1 L Turbo I4 | D | 39; 38 | (Sweden) Eje Elgh | 3, 9 |
| (Japan) Dome Motorsport | Dome RC83i; Dome RC84 | Ford Cosworth DFL 3.3 L V8; Toyota 4T-GT 2.1 L Turbo I4 | D | 39; 38 | (Sweden) Stanley Dickens | 3 |
| (Japan) Dome Motorsport | Dome RC83i; Dome RC84 | Ford Cosworth DFL 3.3 L V8; Toyota 4T-GT 2.1 L Turbo I4 | D | 39; 38 | (Japan) Masanori Sekiya | 9 |
| (Japan) Hoshino Racing | March 83G | Nissan LZ20B 2.1 L Turbo I4 | B | 30 | (Japan) Kazuyoshi Hoshino | 9 |
| (Japan) Hoshino Racing | March 83G | Nissan LZ20B 2.1 L Turbo I4 | B | 30 | (Japan) Akira Hagiwara | 9 |
| (United Kingdom) Viscount Downe with Aston Martin Lagonda | Nimrod NRA/C2 | Aston Martin DP1229 5.3 L V8 | A | 31 | (United Kingdom) Richard Attwood | 2–3 |
| (United Kingdom) Viscount Downe with Aston Martin Lagonda | Nimrod NRA/C2 | Aston Martin DP1229 5.3 L V8 | A | 31 | (United Kingdom) John Sheldon | 2 |
| (United Kingdom) Viscount Downe with Aston Martin Lagonda | Nimrod NRA/C2 | Aston Martin DP1229 5.3 L V8 | A | 31 | (United Kingdom) Mike Salmon | 2 |
| (United Kingdom) Viscount Downe with Aston Martin Lagonda | Nimrod NRA/C2 | Aston Martin DP1229 5.3 L V8 | A | 31 | (United Kingdom) Ray Mallock | 3 |
| (United Kingdom) Viscount Downe with Aston Martin Lagonda | Nimrod NRA/C2 | Aston Martin DP1229 5.3 L V8 | A | 31 | (United States) Drake Olson | 3 |
| (United Kingdom) Viscount Downe with Aston Martin Lagonda | Nimrod NRA/C2 | Aston Martin DP1229 5.3 L V8 | A | 32 | (United Kingdom) Mike Salmon | 2–3 |
| (United Kingdom) Viscount Downe with Aston Martin Lagonda | Nimrod NRA/C2 | Aston Martin DP1229 5.3 L V8 | A | 32 | (United Kingdom) Ray Mallock | 2 |
| (United Kingdom) Viscount Downe with Aston Martin Lagonda | Nimrod NRA/C2 | Aston Martin DP1229 5.3 L V8 | A | 32 | (United States) Drake Olson | 2 |
| (United Kingdom) Viscount Downe with Aston Martin Lagonda | Nimrod NRA/C2 | Aston Martin DP1229 5.3 L V8 | A | 32 | (United Kingdom) John Sheldon | 3 |
| (United Kingdom) Viscount Downe with Aston Martin Lagonda | Nimrod NRA/C2 | Aston Martin DP1229 5.3 L V8 | A | 32 | (United Kingdom) Richard Attwood | 3 |
| (United Kingdom) Skoal Bandit Porsche Team | Porsche 956B; Porsche 962 | Porsche Type-935/76 2.6 L Turbo Flat-6 | Y G | 33 | (United Kingdom) David Hobbs | 1–8, 11 |
| (United Kingdom) Skoal Bandit Porsche Team | Porsche 956B; Porsche 962 | Porsche Type-935/76 2.6 L Turbo Flat-6 | Y G | 33 | (Belgium) Thierry Boutsen | 1–2, 4–5, 7–8, 11 |
| (United Kingdom) Skoal Bandit Porsche Team | Porsche 956B; Porsche 962 | Porsche Type-935/76 2.6 L Turbo Flat-6 | Y G | 33 | (South Africa) Sarel van der Merwe | 3 |
| (United Kingdom) Skoal Bandit Porsche Team | Porsche 956B; Porsche 962 | Porsche Type-935/76 2.6 L Turbo Flat-6 | Y G | 33 | (France) Philippe Streiff | 3 |
| (United Kingdom) Skoal Bandit Porsche Team | Porsche 956B; Porsche 962 | Porsche Type-935/76 2.6 L Turbo Flat-6 | Y G | 33 | (United Kingdom) Rupert Keegan | 6 |
| (United Kingdom) Skoal Bandit Porsche Team | Porsche 956B; Porsche 962 | Porsche Type-935/76 2.6 L Turbo Flat-6 | Y G | 33 | (Austria) Franz Konrad | 6 |
| (United Kingdom) Skoal Bandit Porsche Team | Porsche 956B; Porsche 962 | Porsche Type-935/76 2.6 L Turbo Flat-6 | Y G | 55 | (United Kingdom) Rupert Keegan | 1–8, 11 |
| (United Kingdom) Skoal Bandit Porsche Team | Porsche 956B; Porsche 962 | Porsche Type-935/76 2.6 L Turbo Flat-6 | Y G | 55 | (United Kingdom) Guy Edwards | 1–5 |
| (United Kingdom) Skoal Bandit Porsche Team | Porsche 956B; Porsche 962 | Porsche Type-935/76 2.6 L Turbo Flat-6 | Y G | 55 | (Brazil) Roberto Moreno | 3 |
| (United Kingdom) Skoal Bandit Porsche Team | Porsche 956B; Porsche 962 | Porsche Type-935/76 2.6 L Turbo Flat-6 | Y G | 55 | (Belgium) Thierry Boutsen | 5 |
| (United Kingdom) Skoal Bandit Porsche Team | Porsche 956B; Porsche 962 | Porsche Type-935/76 2.6 L Turbo Flat-6 | Y G | 55 | (Austria) Franz Konrad | 6–8, 11 |
| (United Kingdom) Skoal Bandit Porsche Team | Porsche 956B; Porsche 962 | Porsche Type-935/76 2.6 L Turbo Flat-6 | Y G | 55 | (United Kingdom) David Hobbs | 8 |
| (United Kingdom) John Fitzpatrick Racing; Team Australia | Porsche 956B; Porsche 962 | Porsche Type-935/76 2.6 L Turbo Flat-6 | D | 34 | (Italy) Renzo Zorzi | 1 |
| (United Kingdom) John Fitzpatrick Racing; Team Australia | Porsche 956B; Porsche 962 | Porsche Type-935/76 2.6 L Turbo Flat-6 | D | 34 | (Italy) Giorgio Francia | 1 |
| (United Kingdom) John Fitzpatrick Racing; Team Australia | Porsche 956B; Porsche 962 | Porsche Type-935/76 2.6 L Turbo Flat-6 | D | 34 | (Australia) Larry Perkins | 2–3 |
| (United Kingdom) John Fitzpatrick Racing; Team Australia | Porsche 956B; Porsche 962 | Porsche Type-935/76 2.6 L Turbo Flat-6 | D | 34 | (Australia) Peter Brock | 2–3 |
| (United Kingdom) John Fitzpatrick Racing; Team Australia | Porsche 956B; Porsche 962 | Porsche Type-935/76 2.6 L Turbo Flat-6 | D | 34 | (Austria) Franz Konrad | 4, 7 |
| (United Kingdom) John Fitzpatrick Racing; Team Australia | Porsche 956B; Porsche 962 | Porsche Type-935/76 2.6 L Turbo Flat-6 | D | 34 | (United Kingdom) David Hobbs | 4 |
| (United Kingdom) John Fitzpatrick Racing; Team Australia | Porsche 956B; Porsche 962 | Porsche Type-935/76 2.6 L Turbo Flat-6 | D | 34 | (France) Pierre Yver | 7 |
| (United Kingdom) John Fitzpatrick Racing; Team Australia | Porsche 956B; Porsche 962 | Porsche Type-935/76 2.6 L Turbo Flat-6 | D | 34 | (Australia) Colin Bond | 11 |
| (United Kingdom) John Fitzpatrick Racing; Team Australia | Porsche 956B; Porsche 962 | Porsche Type-935/76 2.6 L Turbo Flat-6 | D | 34 | (Australia) Andrew Miedecke | 11 |
| (West Germany) Procar Automobil AG | Sehcar C830 | Porsche Type-935/76 2.6 L Turbo Flat-6 | D | 35 | (Netherlands) Huub Rothengatter | 1–2 |
| (West Germany) Procar Automobil AG | Sehcar C830 | Porsche Type-935/76 2.6 L Turbo Flat-6 | D | 35 | (West Germany) Clemens Schickentanz | 1–2 |
| (West Germany) Procar Automobil AG | Sehcar C830 | Porsche Type-935/76 2.6 L Turbo Flat-6 | D | 35 | (Belgium) Didier Theys | 7–8 |
| (West Germany) Procar Automobil AG | Sehcar C830 | Porsche Type-935/76 2.6 L Turbo Flat-6 | D | 35 | (Belgium) Pierre Dieudonné | 7–8 |
| (West Germany) Procar Automobil AG | Sehcar C830 | Porsche Type-935/76 2.6 L Turbo Flat-6 | D | 35 | (Netherlands) Boy Hayje | 7 |
| (Japan) XEBEC Motorsport Division | Tom's 83C | Toyota 4T-GT 2.1 L Turbo I4 | D | 35 | (Japan) Kiyoshi Misaki | 9 |
| (Japan) XEBEC Motorsport Division | Tom's 83C | Toyota 4T-GT 2.1 L Turbo I4 | D | 35 | (Japan) Kaoru Hoshino | 9 |
| (Japan) XEBEC Motorsport Division | Tom's 83C | Toyota 4T-GT 2.1 L Turbo I4 | D | 35 | (Japan) Kazuo Mogi | 9 |
| (Japan) Tom's | Tom's 84C | Toyota 4T-GT 2.1 L Turbo I4 | B | 36 | (Japan) Satoru Nakajima | 9 |
| (Japan) Tom's | Tom's 84C | Toyota 4T-GT 2.1 L Turbo I4 | B | 36 | (Japan) Keiji Matsumoto | 9 |
| (United States) McCormack and Dodge | Rondeau M482 | Ford Cosworth DFL 3.3 L V8 | G | 37 | (United States) Jim Mullen | 3 |
| (United States) McCormack and Dodge | Rondeau M482 | Ford Cosworth DFL 3.3 L V8 | G | 37 | (United States) Walt Bohren | 3 |
| (United States) McCormack and Dodge | Rondeau M482 | Ford Cosworth DFL 3.3 L V8 | G | 37 | (France) Alain Ferté | 3 |
| (Japan) Team Ikuzawa | Tom's 84C | Toyota 4T-GT 2.1 L Turbo I4 | D | 37 | (United Kingdom) Tiff Needell | 9 |
| (Japan) Team Ikuzawa | Tom's 84C | Toyota 4T-GT 2.1 L Turbo I4 | D | 37 | (United Kingdom) James Weaver | 9 |
| (United Kingdom) Dorset Racing Associates | Dome RC82 | Ford Cosworth DFL 3.3 L V8 | D | 38 | (United Kingdom) Richard Jones | 2–3 |
| (United Kingdom) Dorset Racing Associates | Dome RC82 | Ford Cosworth DFL 3.3 L V8 | D | 38 | (Republic of Ireland) Mark Galvin | 2–3 |
| (United Kingdom) Dorset Racing Associates | Dome RC82 | Ford Cosworth DFL 3.3 L V8 | D | 38 | (United Kingdom) John Williams | 2 |
| (United Kingdom) Dorset Racing Associates | Dome RC82 | Ford Cosworth DFL 3.3 L V8 | D | 38 | (United Kingdom) Nick Faure | 3 |
| (West Germany) Motorsportclub Rosenheim e.V. | TOJ C390 | Ford Cosworth DFL 3.3 L V8 | | 38 | (West Germany) Martin Wagenstetter | 4 |
| (West Germany) Motorsportclub Rosenheim e.V. | TOJ C390 | Ford Cosworth DFL 3.3 L V8 | | 38 | (West Germany) Kurt Hild | 4 |
| Cheetah Automobiles Switzerland | Cheetah G604 | Aston Martin 5.3 L V8 | D | 42 | (Belgium) Bernard de Dryver | 7–8 |
| Cheetah Automobiles Switzerland | Cheetah G604 | Aston Martin 5.3 L V8 | D | 42 | (United Kingdom) Ray Mallock | 7–8 |
| (France) Christian Bussi | Rondeau M382 | Ford Cosworth DFL 3.3 L V8 | D | 45 | (France) Christian Bussi | 3 |
| (France) Christian Bussi | Rondeau M382 | Ford Cosworth DFL 3.3 L V8 | D | 45 | (France) Bruno Ilien | 3 |
| (France) Christian Bussi | Rondeau M382 | Ford Cosworth DFL 3.3 L V8 | D | 45 | (United States) Jack Griffin | 3 |
| (France) Pierre Yver | Rondeau M382 | Ford Cosworth DFL 3.3 L V8 | D | 46; 50 | (France) Pierre Yver | 1–3 |
| (France) Pierre Yver | Rondeau M382 | Ford Cosworth DFL 3.3 L V8 | D | 46; 50 | (Belgium) Bernard de Dryver | 1–3 |
| (France) Pierre Yver | Rondeau M382 | Ford Cosworth DFL 3.3 L V8 | D | 46; 50 | (France) Pierre-François Rousselot | 3 |
| (West Germany) GWB Ford Zakspeed Team | Zakspeed C1/8 | Ford Cosworth DFL 3.3 L V8 | | 48 | (West Germany) Klaus Ludwig | 4 |
| (West Germany) GWB Ford Zakspeed Team | Zakspeed C1/8 | Ford Cosworth DFL 3.3 L V8 | | 48 | (West Germany) Klaus Niedzwiedz | 4 |
| (Japan) Hasemi Motorsport | LM 04C | Nissan LZ20B 2.1 L Turbo I4 | D | 50 | (Japan) Masahiro Hasemi | 9 |
| (Japan) Hasemi Motorsport | LM 04C | Nissan LZ20B 2.1 L Turbo I4 | D | 50 | (Japan) Kenji Tohira | 9 |
| (Japan) Trust Racing Team | Porsche 956B | Porsche Type-935/76 2.6 L Turbo Flat-6 | D | 60 | (Australia) Vern Schuppan | 9 |
| (Japan) Trust Racing Team | Porsche 956B | Porsche Type-935/76 2.6 L Turbo Flat-6 | D | 60 | (West Germany) Hans-Joachim Stuck | 9 |
| (United Kingdom) John Bartlett | Lola T610 | Ford Cosworth DFL 3.3 L V8 | D | 65; 48 | (United Kingdom) Steve Kempton | 2–3, 5 |
| (United Kingdom) John Bartlett | Lola T610 | Ford Cosworth DFL 3.3 L V8 | D | 65; 48 | (United Kingdom) John Bartlett | 2 |
| (United Kingdom) John Bartlett | Lola T610 | Ford Cosworth DFL 3.3 L V8 | D | 65; 48 | (United Kingdom) John Brindley | 2 |
| (United Kingdom) John Bartlett | Lola T610 | Ford Cosworth DFL 3.3 L V8 | D | 65; 48 | (France) François Migault | 3 |
| (United Kingdom) John Bartlett | Lola T610 | Ford Cosworth DFL 3.3 L V8 | D | 65; 48 | (France) François Servanin | 3 |
| (United Kingdom) John Bartlett | Lola T610 | Ford Cosworth DFL 3.3 L V8 | D | 65; 48 | (Morocco) Max Cohen-Olivar | 5 |
| (United Kingdom) John Bartlett | Lola T610 | Ford Cosworth DFL 3.3 L V8 | D | 65; 48 | (United Kingdom) Roger Andreason | 5 |

=== Group C2 ===
| Entrant | Car | Engine | Tyre | No. | Drivers | Rounds |
|---|---|---|---|---|---|---|
| (United States) BFGoodrich Company | Lola T616 | Mazda 13B 1.3 L 2-rotor | BF | 67 | (United States) Jim Busby | 1, 3–4, 9 |
| (United States) BFGoodrich Company | Lola T616 | Mazda 13B 1.3 L 2-rotor | BF | 67 | (United States) Rick Knoop | 1, 3 |
| (United States) BFGoodrich Company | Lola T616 | Mazda 13B 1.3 L 2-rotor | BF | 67 | (Netherlands) Boy Hayje | 3 |
| (United States) BFGoodrich Company | Lola T616 | Mazda 13B 1.3 L 2-rotor | BF | 67 | (United States) Pete Halsmer | 4, 9 |
| (United States) BFGoodrich Company | Lola T616 | Mazda 13B 1.3 L 2-rotor | BF | 68 | (Austria) Dieter Quester | 1, 4, 9 |
| (United States) BFGoodrich Company | Lola T616 | Mazda 13B 1.3 L 2-rotor | BF | 68 | (Netherlands) Boy Hayje | 1 |
| (United States) BFGoodrich Company | Lola T616 | Mazda 13B 1.3 L 2-rotor | BF | 68 | (United States) John Morton | 3 |
| (United States) BFGoodrich Company | Lola T616 | Mazda 13B 1.3 L 2-rotor | BF | 68 | (United States) John O'Steen | 3 |
| (United States) BFGoodrich Company | Lola T616 | Mazda 13B 1.3 L 2-rotor | BF | 68 | (Japan) Yoshimi Katayama | 3 |
| (United States) BFGoodrich Company | Lola T616 | Mazda 13B 1.3 L 2-rotor | BF | 68 | (United States) Rick Knoop | 4, 9 |
| (United Kingdom) Spice-Tiga Racing (South Africa) Tiga Cars S.A. | Tiga GC84; Tiga SC83 | Ford Cosworth DFL 3.3 L V8; Mazda 13B 1.3 L 2-rotor | A | 70 | (Australia) Neil Crang | 2–5, 7–8, 11 |
| (United Kingdom) Spice-Tiga Racing (South Africa) Tiga Cars S.A. | Tiga GC84; Tiga SC83 | Ford Cosworth DFL 3.3 L V8; Mazda 13B 1.3 L 2-rotor | A | 70 | (United Kingdom) Ray Bellm | 2–5, 7–8 |
| (United Kingdom) Spice-Tiga Racing (South Africa) Tiga Cars S.A. | Tiga GC84; Tiga SC83 | Ford Cosworth DFL 3.3 L V8; Mazda 13B 1.3 L 2-rotor | A | 70 | (United Kingdom) Gordon Spice | 2–4, 7–8, 11 |
| (United Kingdom) Spice-Tiga Racing (South Africa) Tiga Cars S.A. | Tiga GC84; Tiga SC83 | Ford Cosworth DFL 3.3 L V8; Mazda 13B 1.3 L 2-rotor | A | 70 | (South Africa) Lew Baker | 10 |
| (United Kingdom) Spice-Tiga Racing (South Africa) Tiga Cars S.A. | Tiga GC84; Tiga SC83 | Ford Cosworth DFL 3.3 L V8; Mazda 13B 1.3 L 2-rotor | A | 70 | (South Africa) Gordon Hatch | 10 |
| (West Germany) Gebhardt Motorsport | Gebhardt JC842 | BMW M12/7 2.0 L I4 | A | 72 | (West Germany) Frank Jelinski | 1–2, 5, 7–8 |
| (West Germany) Gebhardt Motorsport | Gebhardt JC842 | BMW M12/7 2.0 L I4 | A | 72 | (United States) Cliff Hansen | 1 |
| (West Germany) Gebhardt Motorsport | Gebhardt JC842 | BMW M12/7 2.0 L I4 | A | 72 | (United Kingdom) Bob Evans | 2 |
| (West Germany) Gebhardt Motorsport | Gebhardt JC842 | BMW M12/7 2.0 L I4 | A | 72 | (West Germany) Jan Thoelke | 4–5, 7–8 |
| (West Germany) Gebhardt Motorsport | Gebhardt JC842 | BMW M12/7 2.0 L I4 | A | 72 | (West Germany) Jürgen Weiler | 4, 8 |
| (West Germany) Gebhardt Motorsport | Gebhardt JC842 | BMW M12/7 2.0 L I4 | A | 72 | (West Germany) Udo Wagenhäuser | 4 |
| (West Germany) Gebhardt Motorsport | Gebhardt JC842 | BMW M12/7 2.0 L I4 | A | 72 | (United Kingdom) Gerry Amato | 5 |
| (West Germany) Gebhardt Motorsport | Gebhardt JC842 | BMW M12/7 2.0 L I4 | A | 72 | (Canada) George Schwarz | 7 |
| (West Germany) Gebhardt Motorsport | Gebhardt JC842 | BMW M12/7 2.0 L I4 | A | 72 | (United Kingdom) Ian Harrower | 11 |
| (West Germany) Gebhardt Motorsport | Gebhardt JC842 | BMW M12/7 2.0 L I4 | A | 72 | (New Zealand) Neville Crichton | 11 |
| (West Germany) Gebhardt Motorsport | Gebhardt JC842 | BMW M12/7 2.0 L I4 | A | 72 | (Australia) Richard Davison | 11 |
| (West Germany) Gebhardt Motorsport | Gebhard JC843 | Ford Cosworth DFV 3.0 L V8 | A | 73 | (West Germany) Frank Jelinski | 4, 7–8 |
| (West Germany) Gebhardt Motorsport | Gebhard JC843 | Ford Cosworth DFV 3.0 L V8 | A | 73 | (West Germany) Günther Gebhardt | 4, 7–8 |
| (West Germany) Gebhardt Motorsport | Gebhard JC843 | Ford Cosworth DFV 3.0 L V8 | A | 73 | (West Germany) Mario Ketterer | 4 |
| (West Germany) Gebhardt Motorsport | Gebhard JC843 | Ford Cosworth DFV 3.0 L V8 | A | 73 | (Canada) George Schwarz | 6, 7 |
| (West Germany) Gebhardt Motorsport | Gebhard JC843 | Ford Cosworth DFV 3.0 L V8 | A | 73 | (Canada) John Graham | 6 |
| (West Germany) Gebhardt Motorsport | Gebhard JC843 | Ford Cosworth DFV 3.0 L V8 | A | 73 | (United States) Margie Smith-Haas | 11 |
| (West Germany) Gebhardt Motorsport | Gebhard JC843 | Ford Cosworth DFV 3.0 L V8 | A | 73 | (France) Cathy Muller | 11 |
| (West Germany) Gebhardt Motorsport | Gebhard JC843 | Ford Cosworth DFV 3.0 L V8 | A | 73 | (Australia) Sue Ransom | 11 |
| (West Germany) Gebhardt Motorsport | Gebhard JC843 | Ford Cosworth DFV 3.0 L V8 | A | 74 | (West Germany) Frank Jelinski | 11 |
| (West Germany) Gebhardt Motorsport | Gebhard JC843 | Ford Cosworth DFV 3.0 L V8 | A | 74 | (West Germany) Günther Gebhardt | 11 |
| (West Germany) Gebhardt Motorsport | Gebhard JC843 | Ford Cosworth DFV 3.0 L V8 | A | 74 | (West Germany) Beate Nodes | 11 |
| (United Kingdom) Scorpion Racing Services | Arundel C200 | Ford Cosworth DFV 3.0 L V8 | A | 74 | (United Kingdom) Eddie Arundel | 2 |
| (United Kingdom) Scorpion Racing Services | Arundel C200 | Ford Cosworth DFV 3.0 L V8 | A | 74 | (United Kingdom) James Weaver | 2 |
| (United Kingdom) Scorpion Racing Services | Arundel C200 | Ford Cosworth DFV 3.0 L V8 | A | 74 | (United States) John Jellinek | 2 |
| (Japan) Mishima Auto Racing | MCS Guppy | BMW M12 2.0 L I4 | D | 74 | (Japan) Kaneyuki Okamoto | 9 |
| (Japan) Mishima Auto Racing | MCS Guppy | BMW M12 2.0 L I4 | D | 74 | (Japan) Minoru Sawada | 9 |
| (United Kingdom) Ecurie Ecosse | Ecosse C284 | Ford Cosworth DFV 3.0 L V8 | A | 77 | (United Kingdom) Mike Wilds | 1–3 |
| (United Kingdom) Ecurie Ecosse | Ecosse C284 | Ford Cosworth DFV 3.0 L V8 | A | 77 | (United Kingdom) David Duffield | 1–3 |
| (United Kingdom) Ecurie Ecosse | Ecosse C284 | Ford Cosworth DFV 3.0 L V8 | A | 77 | (United Kingdom) Ray Mallock | 1 |
| (United Kingdom) Ecurie Ecosse | Ecosse C284 | Ford Cosworth DFV 3.0 L V8 | A | 77 | (United Kingdom) David Leslie | 3 |
| (Japan) Team Iwaki | MCS Guppy | Toyota 18R-G 1.8 L I4 | D | 78 | (Japan) Kouichi Iwaki | 9 |
| (Japan) Team Iwaki | MCS Guppy | Toyota 18R-G 1.8 L I4 | D | 78 | (Japan) Masakazu Nakamura | 9 |
| (Japan) Team Iwaki | MCS Guppy | Toyota 18R-G 1.8 L I4 | D | 78 | (Japan) Takashi Tosa | 9 |
| (United Kingdom) ADA Engineering | ADA 01 | Ford Cosworth DFV 3.0 L V8 | G | 79 | (United Kingdom) Ian Harrower | 2–3 |
| (United Kingdom) ADA Engineering | ADA 01 | Ford Cosworth DFV 3.0 L V8 | G | 79 | (United Kingdom) Ray Taft | 2 |
| (United Kingdom) ADA Engineering | ADA 01 | Ford Cosworth DFV 3.0 L V8 | G | 79 | (United Kingdom) Tom Dodd-Noble | 2 |
| (United Kingdom) ADA Engineering | ADA 01 | Ford Cosworth DFV 3.0 L V8 | G | 79 | (United States) Bill Wolff | 3 |
| (United Kingdom) ADA Engineering | ADA 01 | Ford Cosworth DFV 3.0 L V8 | G | 79 | (United States) Glenn Smith | 3 |
| (Japan) Alpha Cubic Racing Team | MCS Guppy | BMW M12 2.0 L I4 | D | 79 | (Japan) Noritake Takahara | 9 |
| (Japan) Alpha Cubic Racing Team | MCS Guppy | BMW M12 2.0 L I4 | D | 79 | (Japan) Chiyomi Totani | 9 |
| (Italy) Jolly Club | Alba AR2 | Giannini 1.9 L Turbo I4 | A | 80 | (Italy) Carlo Facetti | 1–4, 6–9, 11 |
| (Italy) Jolly Club | Alba AR2 | Giannini 1.9 L Turbo I4 | A | 80 | (Italy) Martino Finotto | 1–4, 6–9, 11 |
| (Italy) Jolly Club | Alba AR2 | Giannini 1.9 L Turbo I4 | A | 80 | (Italy) Almo Coppelli | 2 |
| (Italy) Jolly Club | Alba AR2 | Giannini 1.9 L Turbo I4 | A | 80 | (Switzerland) Marco Vanoli | 3 |
| (Italy) Jolly Club | Alba AR2 | Giannini 1.9 L Turbo I4 | A | 80 | (Italy) Alfredo Sebastiani | 4, 6–9 |
| (Italy) Jolly Club | Alba AR2 | Giannini 1.9 L Turbo I4 | A | 80 | (Italy) Guido Daccò | 11 |
| (Italy) Jolly Club | Alba AR2 | Giannini 1.9 L Turbo I4 | A | 81 | (Italy) Almo Coppelli | 1–9 |
| (Italy) Jolly Club | Alba AR2 | Giannini 1.9 L Turbo I4 | A | 81 | (Italy) Davide Pavia | 1–4, 8 |
| (Italy) Jolly Club | Alba AR2 | Giannini 1.9 L Turbo I4 | A | 81 | (Switzerland) Marco Vanoli | 2, 7, 9 |
| (Italy) Jolly Club | Alba AR2 | Giannini 1.9 L Turbo I4 | A | 81 | (Italy) Guido Daccò | 3–4, 6–9, 11 |
| (Italy) Jolly Club | Alba AR2 | Giannini 1.9 L Turbo I4 | A | 81 | (Italy) Carlo Facetti | 5, 11 |
| (Italy) Jolly Club | Alba AR2 | Giannini 1.9 L Turbo I4 | A | 81 | (Italy) Martino Finotto | 5 |
| (Italy) Jolly Club | Alba AR2 | Giannini 1.9 L Turbo I4 | A | 81 | (Australia) Lucio Cesario | 11 |
| (Italy) Maurizio Gellini (Italy) Gianfranco Barberio (Italy) Jolly Club | Alba AR3 | Ford Cosworth DFL 3.3 L V8 | A | 82 | (Italy) Maurizio Gellini | 2, 4, 6–9 |
| (Italy) Maurizio Gellini (Italy) Gianfranco Barberio (Italy) Jolly Club | Alba AR3 | Ford Cosworth DFL 3.3 L V8 | A | 82 | (Italy) Pasquale Barberio | 2, 4, 6–9 |
| (Italy) Maurizio Gellini (Italy) Gianfranco Barberio (Italy) Jolly Club | Alba AR3 | Ford Cosworth DFL 3.3 L V8 | A | 82 | (Italy) Gerardo Vatielli | 2, 4, 6–8 |
| (United Kingdom) Roger Andreason Racing (United Kingdom) John Bartlett | Lola T610 | Ford Cosworth DFL 3.3 L V8 | A | 83 | (United Kingdom) Richard Jones | 8, 11 |
| (United Kingdom) Roger Andreason Racing (United Kingdom) John Bartlett | Lola T610 | Ford Cosworth DFL 3.3 L V8 | A | 83 | (United Kingdom) Roger Andreason | 8 |
| (United Kingdom) Roger Andreason Racing (United Kingdom) John Bartlett | Lola T610 | Ford Cosworth DFL 3.3 L V8 | A | 83 | (United Kingdom) John Brindley | 8 |
| (United Kingdom) Roger Andreason Racing (United Kingdom) John Bartlett | Lola T610 | Ford Cosworth DFL 3.3 L V8 | A | 83 | (United Kingdom) John Bartlett | 11 |
| (United Kingdom) Roger Andreason Racing (United Kingdom) John Bartlett | Lola T610 | Ford Cosworth DFL 3.3 L V8 | A | 83 | (United Kingdom) David Burrows | 11 |
| (Japan) Shimegi Racing | MCS Guppy | Mazda 13B 1.3 L 2-rotor | D | 83 | (Japan) Tooru Shimegi | 9 |
| (Japan) Shimegi Racing | MCS Guppy | Mazda 13B 1.3 L 2-rotor | D | 83 | (Japan) Kaoru Iida | 9 |
| (Japan) Shimegi Racing | MCS Guppy | Mazda 13B 1.3 L 2-rotor | D | 83 | (Japan) Norimasa Sakamoto | 9 |
| (United Kingdom) Lyncar Motorsports | Lyncar MS83 | Ford Cosworth DFV 3.0 L V8 | A | 84; 88 | (Greece) Costas Los | 5–6, 8 |
| (United Kingdom) Lyncar Motorsports | Lyncar MS83 | Ford Cosworth DFV 3.0 L V8 | A | 84; 88 | (New Zealand) John Nicholson | 5, 8 |
| (United Kingdom) Lyncar Motorsports | Lyncar MS83 | Ford Cosworth DFV 3.0 L V8 | A | 84; 88 | (Canada) Allen Berg | 6 |
| (Japan) Auto Beaurex Motorsport | Lotec M1C | BMW M88 3.5 L I6 | D | 84 | (Japan) Naoki Nagasaka | 9 |
| (Japan) Auto Beaurex Motorsport | Lotec M1C | BMW M88 3.5 L I6 | D | 84 | (Japan) Keiichi Suzuki | 9 |
| (France) Hubert Striebig | Sthemo SMC2 | BMW M88 3.5 L I6 | | 85 | (France) Hubert Stiebig | 3–4, 7–8 |
| (France) Hubert Striebig | Sthemo SMC2 | BMW M88 3.5 L I6 | | 85 | (France) Noël del Bello | 3–4 |
| (France) Hubert Striebig | Sthemo SMC2 | BMW M88 3.5 L I6 | | 85 | (France) Jacques Heuclin | 3 |
| (France) Hubert Striebig | Sthemo SMC2 | BMW M88 3.5 L I6 | | 85 | (Morocco) Max Cohen-Olivar | 4, 7–8 |
| (Japan) Setrab Racing by Yours | Mazda 727C | Mazda 13B 1.3 L 2-rotor | D | 85 | (Japan) Hideki Okada | 9 |
| (Japan) Setrab Racing by Yours | Mazda 727C | Mazda 13B 1.3 L 2-rotor | D | 85 | (Japan) Masatomo Shimizu | 9 |
| (Japan) Setrab Racing by Yours | Mazda 727C | Mazda 13B 1.3 L 2-rotor | D | 85 | (Japan) Tomohiko Tsutsumi | 9 |
| (Japan) Mazdaspeed Co. Ltd. | Mazda 727C | Mazda 13B 1.3 L 2-rotor | D | 86 | (Japan) Yojiro Terada | 2–3, 9 |
| (Japan) Mazdaspeed Co. Ltd. | Mazda 727C | Mazda 13B 1.3 L 2-rotor | D | 86 | (Belgium) Pierre Dieudonné | 2–3 |
| (Japan) Mazdaspeed Co. Ltd. | Mazda 727C | Mazda 13B 1.3 L 2-rotor | D | 86 | (Japan) Takashi Yorino | 3 |
| (Japan) Mazdaspeed Co. Ltd. | Mazda 727C | Mazda 13B 1.3 L 2-rotor | D | 86 | (Republic of Ireland) David Kennedy | 9 |
| (Japan) Mazdaspeed Co. Ltd. | Mazda 727C | Mazda 13B 1.3 L 2-rotor | D | 87 | (Belgium) Jean-Michel Martin | 3, 9 |
| (Japan) Mazdaspeed Co. Ltd. | Mazda 727C | Mazda 13B 1.3 L 2-rotor | D | 87 | (Republic of Ireland) David Kennedy | 3, 9 |
| (Japan) Mazdaspeed Co. Ltd. | Mazda 727C | Mazda 13B 1.3 L 2-rotor | D | 87 | (Belgium) Philippe Martin | 3 |
| (United Kingdom) Arthur Hough Pressings Ark Racing | Ceekar 83J-1 | Ford Cosworth BDX 2.0 L I4 | A | 88 | (United Kingdom) Max Payne | 2, 4–5, 7 |
| (United Kingdom) Arthur Hough Pressings Ark Racing | Ceekar 83J-1 | Ford Cosworth BDX 2.0 L I4 | A | 88 | (United Kingdom) Chris Ashmore | 2, 4–5, 7 |
| (South Africa) DAW Supplies | Tiga SC83 | Mazda 13B 1.3 L 2-rotor | | 90 | (South Africa) Trevor von Rooyen | 10 |
| (South Africa) DAW Supplies | Tiga SC83 | Mazda 13B 1.3 L 2-rotor | | 90 | (South Africa) Peter Morrison | 10 |
| (Denmark) Jens Winther Team Castrol | URD C81 | BMW M88 3.5 L I6 | A | 90 | (Denmark) Jens Winther | 11 |
| (Denmark) Jens Winther Team Castrol | URD C81 | BMW M88 3.5 L I6 | A | 90 | (Denmark) Lars-Viggo Jensen | 11 |
| (France) Jean-Philippe Grand | Rondeau M379C | Ford Cosworth DFV 3.0 L V8 | A | 93 | (France) Jean-Philippe Grand | 1, 3, 7 |
| (France) Jean-Philippe Grand | Rondeau M379C | Ford Cosworth DFV 3.0 L V8 | A | 93 | (Belgium) Jean-Paul Libert | 1, 3, 7 |
| (France) Jean-Philippe Grand | Rondeau M379C | Ford Cosworth DFV 3.0 L V8 | A | 93 | (Belgium) Pascal Witmeur | 1, 3, 7 |
| (West Germany) Siegfriend Rieger | Rieger CJ 84 | Ford Cosworth DFV 3.0 L V8 | G | 94 | (West Germany) Siegfried Rieger | 4 |
| (West Germany) Siegfriend Rieger | Rieger CJ 84 | Ford Cosworth DFV 3.0 L V8 | G | 94 | (West Germany) Rolf Götz | 4 |
| (West Germany) Siegfriend Rieger | Rieger CJ 84 | Ford Cosworth DFV 3.0 L V8 | G | 94 | (United States) Carl Kirts | 4 |
| (United Kingdom) Gil Baird Techspeed Racing | Grid S1 | Ford Cosworth DFL 3.3 L V8 | A | 94 | (United Kingdom) Steve Thompson | 5 |
| (United Kingdom) Gil Baird Techspeed Racing | Grid S1 | Ford Cosworth DFL 3.3 L V8 | A | 94 | (United Kingdom) Tom Lanfranchi | 5 |
| (United Kingdom) Gil Baird Techspeed Racing | Grid S1 | Ford Cosworth DFL 3.3 L V8 | A | 94 | (United Kingdom) Divina Galica | 5 |
| (United Kingdom) JQF Engineering (United Kingdom) RB Promotion | Tiga GC284 | Ford Cosworth BDT 1.8 L Turbo I4 | A | 99 | (United Kingdom) Jeremy Rossiter | 2–3, 5–9, 11 |
| (United Kingdom) JQF Engineering (United Kingdom) RB Promotion | Tiga GC284 | Ford Cosworth BDT 1.8 L Turbo I4 | A | 99 | (United Kingdom) Roy Baker | 2–3, 5–8, 11 |
| (United Kingdom) JQF Engineering (United Kingdom) RB Promotion | Tiga GC284 | Ford Cosworth BDT 1.8 L Turbo I4 | A | 99 | (France) François Duret | 2–3 |
| (United Kingdom) JQF Engineering (United Kingdom) RB Promotion | Tiga GC284 | Ford Cosworth BDT 1.8 L Turbo I4 | A | 99 | (Canada) Peter Lockhart | 6 |
| (United Kingdom) JQF Engineering (United Kingdom) RB Promotion | Tiga GC284 | Ford Cosworth BDT 1.8 L Turbo I4 | A | 99 | (United Kingdom) Paul Smith | 7 |
| (United Kingdom) JQF Engineering (United Kingdom) RB Promotion | Tiga GC284 | Ford Cosworth BDT 1.8 L Turbo I4 | A | 99 | (West Germany) Altfrid Heger | 9 |
| (United Kingdom) JQF Engineering (United Kingdom) RB Promotion | Tiga GC284 | Ford Cosworth BDT 1.8 L Turbo I4 | A | 99 | (France) Philippe Colonna | 9 |
| (United Kingdom) JQF Engineering (United Kingdom) RB Promotion | Tiga GC284 | Ford Cosworth BDT 1.8 L Turbo I4 | A | 99 | (United Kingdom) Gary Evans | 11 |

=== IMSA GTP ===
| Entrant | Car | Engine | Tyre | No. | Drivers | Rounds |
|---|---|---|---|---|---|---|
| (United States) Group 44 Jaguar | Jaguar XJR-5 | Jaguar 5.0 L V12 | G | 40 | (United States) Tony Adamowicz | 3 |
| (United States) Group 44 Jaguar | Jaguar XJR-5 | Jaguar 5.0 L V12 | G | 40 | (United Kingdom) John Watson | 3 |
| (United States) Group 44 Jaguar | Jaguar XJR-5 | Jaguar 5.0 L V12 | G | 40 | (France) Claude Ballot-Léna | 3 |
| (United States) Group 44 Jaguar | Jaguar XJR-5 | Jaguar 5.0 L V12 | G | 44 | (United States) Bob Tullius | 3 |
| (United States) Group 44 Jaguar | Jaguar XJR-5 | Jaguar 5.0 L V12 | G | 44 | (United States) Doc Bundy | 3 |
| (United States) Group 44 Jaguar | Jaguar XJR-5 | Jaguar 5.0 L V12 | G | 44 | (United Kingdom) Brian Redman | 3 |
| (United States) Henn's T-Bird Swap Shop | Porsche 962 | Porsche Type-962/70 2.9 L Turbo Flat-6 | G | 61 | (United States) Preston Henn | 3 |
| (United States) Henn's T-Bird Swap Shop | Porsche 962 | Porsche Type-962/70 2.9 L Turbo Flat-6 | G | 61 | (West Germany) Edgar Dören | 3 |
| (United States) Henn's T-Bird Swap Shop | Porsche 962 | Porsche Type-962/70 2.9 L Turbo Flat-6 | G | 61 | (France) Michel Ferté | 3 |
| (United States) Pegasus Racing | March 84G | Buick 3.3 L Turbo V6 | G | 62 | (United States) Wayne Pickering | 3 |
| (United States) Pegasus Racing | March 84G | Buick 3.3 L Turbo V6 | G | 62 | (United States) Ken Madren | 3 |
| (United States) Pegasus Racing | March 84G | Buick 3.3 L Turbo V6 | G | 62 | (United States) M. L. Speer | 3 |
| (United Kingdom) Nayler Road & Motorsport | Tiga 83TSGT | Hart 420R 2.0 L I4 | | 92 | (United Kingdom) Tim Lee-Davey | 5 |
| (United Kingdom) Nayler Road & Motorsport | Tiga 83TSGT | Hart 420R 2.0 L I4 | | 92 | (United Kingdom) Adrian Hall | 5 |
| (United Kingdom) Nayler Road & Motorsport | Tiga 83TSGT | Hart 420R 2.0 L I4 | | 92 | (United Kingdom) Mike Kimpton | 5 |
| (United States) Kendall Racing | Lola T600 | Chevrolet 4.7 L V8 | B | 131 | (United States) Chuck Kendall | 9, 11 |
| (United States) Kendall Racing | Lola T600 | Chevrolet 4.7 L V8 | B | 131 | (United States) Jim Cook | 9, 11 |
| (United States) Kendall Racing | Lola T600 | Chevrolet 4.7 L V8 | B | 131 | (Australia) Peter Fitzgerald | 11 |
| (United Kingdom) Lyncar Motorsports | Lyncar MS83 | Hart 420R 2.0 L I4 | A | 132 | (Greece) Costas Los | 1–2 |
| (United Kingdom) Lyncar Motorsports | Lyncar MS83 | Hart 420R 2.0 L I4 | A | 132 | (United Kingdom) Les Blackburn | 1–2 |
| (United Kingdom) Lyncar Motorsports | Lyncar MS83 | Hart 420R 2.0 L I4 | A | 132 | (United Kingdom) Richard Down | 2 |
| (Japan) Top Fuel Racing | Mazda RX-7 845 | Mazda 12A 1.2 L 2-rotor | B | 138 | (Japan) Mutsuo Kazama | 9 |
| (Japan) Top Fuel Racing | Mazda RX-7 845 | Mazda 12A 1.2 L 2-rotor | B | 138 | (Japan) Hironobu Tatsumi | 9 |
| (Japan) Top Fuel Racing | Mazda RX-7 845 | Mazda 12A 1.2 L 2-rotor | B | 138 | (Japan) Yoshiyuki Ogura | 9 |

== Results ==
=== Races ===
Race results for the 1984 FIA World Endurance Championship were as follows:

| Race | Circuit | Outright winning team | Gr. C2 winning team | Gr. B winning team | Results |
| Race | Circuit | Outright winning drivers | Gr. C2 winning drivers | Gr. B winning drivers | Results |
| Race | Circuit | Outright winning car | Gr. C2 winning car | Gr. B winning car | Results |
|---|---|---|---|---|---|
| 1 | Monza | (Germany) Rothmans Porsche | (United States) Jim Busby Racing | (Denmark) Jens Winther | Results |
| 1 | Monza | (United Kingdom) Derek Bell (Germany) Stefan Bellof | (United States) Jim Busby (United States) Rick Knoop | (Denmark) Jens Winther (Denmark) Lars Viggo-Jensen | Results |
| 1 | Monza | Porsche 956 | Lola T616 Mazda | BMW M1 | Results |
| 2 | Silverstone | (Germany) Rothmans Porsche | (Italy) Jolly Club | (Germany) Racing Team Jürgensen | Results |
| 2 | Silverstone | (Belgium) Jacky Ickx (Germany) Jochen Mass | (Italy) Almo Coppelli (Italy) Domenico Pavia (Switzerland) Marco Vanoli | (Germany) Edgar Dören (Germany) Heinz-Christian Jürgensen (Germany) Walter Mertes | Results |
| 2 | Silverstone | Porsche 956 | Alba AR2 Giannini | BMW M1 | Results |
| 3 | Le Mans | (Germany) Joest Racing | (United States) Jim Busby Racing | (Germany) Helmut Gall | Results |
| 3 | Le Mans | (Germany) Klaus Ludwig (France) Henri Pescarolo | (United States) John O'Steen (United States) John Morton (Japan) Yoshimi Katayama | (France) Pierre de Thoisy (France) Jean-Francois Yvon (France) Philippe Dagoreau | Results |
| 3 | Le Mans | Porsche 956 | Lola T616 Mazda | BMW M1 | Results |
| 4 | Nürburgring | (Germany) Rothmans Porsche | (United Kingdom) Spice-Tiga Racing | (Germany) Helmut Gall | Results |
| 4 | Nürburgring | (United Kingdom) Derek Bell (Germany) Stefan Bellof | (United Kingdom) Gordon Spice (United Kingdom) Ray Bellm (Australia) Neil Crang | (Germany) Helmut Gall (Germany) Kurt König (Germany) Altfrid Heger | Results |
| 4 | Nürburgring | Porsche 956 | Tiga GC84 Ford | BMW M1 | Results |
| 5 | Brands Hatch | (United Kingdom) GTi Engineering | (United Kingdom) Spice-Tiga Racing | (Denmark) Jens Winther | Results |
| 5 | Brands Hatch | (United Kingdom) Jonathan Palmer (Netherlands) Jan Lammers | (United Kingdom) Ray Bellm (Australia) Neil Crang | (Denmark) Jens Winther (Denmark) Lars Viggo-Jensen (United Kingdom) David Mercer | Results |
| 5 | Brands Hatch | Porsche 956 | Tiga GC84 Ford | BMW M1 | Results |
| 6 | Mosport | (Germany) Rothmans Porsche | (Italy) Jolly Club | None | Results |
| 6 | Mosport | (Belgium) Jacky Ickx (Germany) Jochen Mass | (Italy) Almo Coppelli (Italy) Guido Dacco | | Results |
| 6 | Mosport | Porsche 956 | Alba AR2 Giannini | | Results |
| 7 | Spa-Francorchamps | (Germany) Rothmans Porsche | (United Kingdom) Spice-Tiga Racing | (Denmark) Jens Winther | Results |
| 7 | Spa-Francorchamps | (United Kingdom) Derek Bell (Germany) Stefan Bellof | (United Kingdom) Gordon Spice (United Kingdom) Ray Bellm (Australia) Neil Crang | (Denmark) Jens Winther (Denmark) Lars Viggo-Jensen (United Kingdom) David Mercer | Results |
| 7 | Spa-Francorchamps | Porsche 956 | Tiga GC84 Ford | BMW M1 | Results |
| 8 | Imola | (Switzerland) Brun Motorsport | (United Kingdom) Spice-Tiga Racing | (Germany) Rolf Göring | Results |
| 8 | Imola | (Germany) Hans Joachim Stuck (Germany) Stefan Bellof | (United Kingdom) Gordon Spice (United Kingdom) Ray Bellm (Australia) Neil Crang | (Germany) Rolf Göring (Switzerland) Hans-Jürgen Dürig (Switzerland) Claude Haldi | Results |
| 8 | Imola | Porsche 956 | Tiga GC84 Ford | BMW M1 | Results |
| 9 | Fuji | (Germany) Rothmans Porsche | (Japan) Auto Beaurex Motorsport | None | Results |
| 9 | Fuji | (United Kingdom) John Watson (Germany) Stefan Bellof | (Japan) Naoki Nagasaka (Japan) Keiichi Suzuki | | Results |
| 9 | Fuji | Porsche 956 | Lotec C302 BMW | | Results |
| 10 | Kyalami | (Italy) Martini Racing | None | None | Results |
| 10 | Kyalami | (Italy) Riccardo Patrese (Italy) Alessandro Nannini | | | Results |
| 10 | Kyalami | Lancia LC2-84 | | | Results |
| 11 | Sandown Park | (Germany) Rothmans Porsche | (United Kingdom) Spice-Tiga Racing | (Germany) Helmut Gall | Results |
| 11 | Sandown Park | (United Kingdom) Derek Bell (Germany) Stefan Bellof | (United Kingdom) Gordon Spice (Australia) Neil Crang | (Germany) Helmut Gall (Germany) Altfrid Heger | Results |
| 11 | Sandown Park | Porsche 956 | Tiga GC84 Ford | BMW M1 | Results |

=== World Endurance Championship for Drivers ===
| Position | Driver | Car | Entrant | Mon | Sil | LM | Nur | BH | Mos | Spa | Imo | Fuj | Kyl | San | Total |
| 1 | Stefan Bellof | Porsche 956 | Rothmans Porsche; Brun Motorsport | 20 | (1) | - | 20 | 8 | 10 | 20 | 20 | 20 | - | 20 | 138 |
| 2 | Jochen Mass | Porsche 956 | Rothmans Porsche; Joest Racing | 15 | 20 | - | (4) | 15 | 20 | 15 | 12 | 15 | - | 15 | 127 |
| 3 | Jacky Ickx | Porsche 956 | Rothmans Porsche | 15 | 20 | - | 4 | - | 20 | 15 | - | 15 | - | 15 | 104 |
| 4 | Derek Bell | Porsche 956 | Rothmans Porsche | 20 | 1 | - | 20 | - | 10 | 20 | - | - | - | 20 | 91 |
| = | Henri Pescarolo | Porsche 956 | Joest Racing | - | 15 | 20 | 3 | 15 | - | - | 12 | 10 | 12 | 4 | 91 |
| 6 | Jonathon Palmer | Porsche 956 | GTi Engineering | 8 | 8 | - | 10 | 20 | - | - | 15 | 2 | - | 12 | 75 |
| = | Jan Lammers | Porsche 956 | GTi Engineering | 8 | 8 | - | 10 | 20 | - | - | 15 | 2 | - | 12 | 75 |
| 8 | Hans-Joachim Stuck | Porsche 956 | Brun Motorsport | 10 | - | - | - | - | - | 12 | 20 | 12 | - | - | 54 |
| 9 | David Hobbs | Porsche 956 | John Fitzpatrick Racing | - | 3 | 12 | 15 | 6 | 15 | - | 3 | - | - | - | 54 |
| 10 | Walter Brun | Porsche 956 | Brun Motorsport | 10 | - | 10 | 2 | 3 | - | 12 | 10 | - | - | - | 47 |
| 11 | Rupert Keegan | Porsche 956 | John Fitzpatrick Racing | - | 12 | - | - | 12 | 15 | - | 3 | - | - | 2 | 44 |
| 12 | Klaus Ludwig | Porsche 956 | Joest Racing | - | 15 | 20 | - | - | - | - | - | - | - | 4 | 39 |
| 13 | Dieter Schonstein | Porsche 956 | Schornstein Racing Team | 8 | 2 | 8 | 1 | 2 | - | 3 | 4 | - | 12 | - | 40 |
| 14 | Paolo Barilla | Lancia LC2-84 | Martini Racing | 12 | 10 | - | - | - | - | - | - | - | 15 | - | 37 |
| 15 | Harald Grohs | Porsche 956 | Brun Motorsport | 10 | - | - | - | 8 | - | 12 | 6 | - | - | - | 36 |
| 16 | Alessandro Nannini | Lancia LC2-84 | Martini Racing | - | - | 3 | 12 | - | - | - | - | - | 20 | - | 35 |
| 17 | George Fouche | Kremer Porsche CK5; Porsche 956 | Kremer Racing; Brun Motorsport | - | - | - | - | 10 | - | 4 | 10 | - | - | 10 | 34 |
| 18 | John Winter | Porsche 956 | Schornstein Racing Team; Joest Racing | - | 2 | 8 | 1 | 2 | - | - | 4 | - | 12 | - | 29 |
| 19 | Mauro Baldi | Lancia LC2-84; Lancia LC2-83 | Martini Racing; Jolly Club | 12 | 10 | - | - | 4 | - | - | 2 | - | - | - | 28 |
| = | Massimo Sigala | Porsche 956 | Brun Motorsport; Team Gaggia | - | - | 4 | 6 | - | - | 10 | 8 | - | - | - | 28 |
| = | Oscar Larrauri | Porsche 956 | Brun Motorsport; Team Gaggia | - | - | 4 | 6 | - | - | 10 | 8 | - | - | - | 28 |
| 22 | Vern Schuppan | Porsche 956 | Kremer Racing; Rothmans Porsche; Trust Racing Team | - | - | 6 | - | - | - | 6 | - | 12 | - | 3 | 27 |
| 23 | John Watson | Jaguar XJR-5; Porsche 956 | Group 44 Racing; Rothmans Porsche | - | - | - | - | - | - | 6 | - | 20 | - | - | 26 |
| 24 | Manfred Winkelhock | Porsche 956 | Kremer Racing | - | - | - | 8 | - | - | - | - | 8 | - | 8 | 24 |
| 25 | Franz Konrad | Porsche 956 | Kremer Racing; John Fitzpatrick Racing | - | 6 | - | - | - | 15 | - | - | - | - | 2 | 23 |
| 26 | Sarel Van der Merwe | Porsche 956 | John Fitzpatrick Racing | - | - | 12 | - | - | - | - | - | - | - | 10 | 22 |
| 27 | Riccardo Patrese | Lancia LC2-84 | Martini Racing | - | - | - | - | - | - | - | - | - | 20 | - | 20 |
| 28 | David Sutherland | Porsche 956 | Kremer Racing | - | 6 | 2 | - | 10 | - | - | - | - | - | - | 18 |
| = | Thierry Boutsen | Porsche 956 | John Fitzpatrick Racing | - | 3 | - | 15 | - | - | - | - | - | - | - | 18 |
| = | Bob Wollek | Lancia LC2-84 | Martini Racing | - | - | 3 | - | - | - | - | - | - | 15 | - | 18 |
| 31 | Merl Volkert | Porsche 956 | Schornstein Racing Team | 6 | 2 | 8 | 1 | - | - | - | - | - | - | - | 17 |

A total of 84 drivers were classified in the 1984 World Endurance Championship for Drivers.

Points were awarded to the top 10 finishers in each race on a 20-15-12-10-8-6-4-3-2-1 basis, with the following exceptions:

- Drivers failing to drive the car for a prescribed minimum percentage of the laps in a race were not awarded points.
- Drivers were not awarded points if the car did not complete 90% of the distance covered by the race winning car.

Only the best eight scores for each driver counted towards the championship, with any other points being discarded.

=== World Endurance Championship for Manufacturers ===
| Pos. | Chassis | Engine | Mon | Sil | LM | Nur | Mos | Spa | Fuj | Kya | Total |
|---|---|---|---|---|---|---|---|---|---|---|---|
| 1 | (Germany) Porsche | (Germany) Porsche | 20 | 20 | 20 | 20 | 20 | 20 | (20) | (12) | 120 |
| 2 | (Italy) Lancia | (Italy) Lancia | 12 | 10 | 3 | 12 | | | | 20 | 57 |
| 3 | (Italy) Alba | (Italy) Giannini | | | | | 12 | | | | 12 |
| 4 | (Italy) Alba | (United Kingdom) Ford | | | | | 8 | | | | 8 |
| 5 | (United Kingdom) Tiga | (United Kingdom) Ford | | | | | 4 | 2 | | | 6 |
| = | (Germany) Lotec | (Germany) BMW | | | | | | | 6 | | 6 |
| 7 | (France) Rondeau | (United Kingdom) Ford | 4 | | | | | 1 | | | 5 |
| 8 | (United Kingdom) Lola | (Japan) Mazda | 3 | | 1 | | | | | | 4 |
| = | (Japan) Toyota | (Japan) Toyota | | | | | | | 4 | | 4 |
| 10 | (United Kingdom) MCS | (Japan) Mazda | | | | | | | 3 | | 3 |
| 11 | (Germany) BMW | (Germany) BMW | 2 | | | | | | | | 2 |
| 12 | (United Kingdom) Ecosse | (United Kingdom) Ford | 1 | | | | | | | | 1 |
| = | (United Kingdom) Lola | (United States) Chevrolet | | | | | | | 1 | | 1 |

Points were awarded to the top 10 finishers in the order of 20-15-12-10-8-6-4-3-2-1.

Manufacturers were awarded points only for their best placed car with no points awarded for places gained by any additional cars.

The chassis builder and engine builder of a competing car were considered as a single entity for classification purposes.

The races at Brands Hatch, Imola and Sandown Park were qualifying rounds for the World Endurance Championship for Drivers but not for the three manufacturers awards.

Only the best six scores for each manufacturer counted towards the championship, with any other points being discarded. Discarded points are shown with brackets.

In addition to competing for the World Endurance Championship for Manufacturers, Group C2 and Group B cars also competed for their own separate awards.

=== Group C2 Prototype FIA Cup ===
| Pos. | Chassis | Engine | Mon | Sil | LM | Nur | Mos | Spa | Fuj | Kya | Total |
|---|---|---|---|---|---|---|---|---|---|---|---|
| 1 | (Italy) Alba | (Italy) Giannini | 12 | 20 | 8 | 10 | 20 | 10 | (8) | | 80 |
| 2 | (United Kingdom) Lola | (Japan) Mazda | 20 | | 20 | 15 | | | 12 | | 67 |
| 3 | (United Kingdom) Tiga | (United Kingdom) Ford | | | | 20 | 10 | 20 | | | 50 |
| 4 | (Germany) Gebhardt | (Germany) Ford | 10 | | | 12 | | 12 | | | 34 |
| 5 | (France) Rondeau | (United Kingdom) Ford | | | 15 | | 15 | | | | 30 |
| 4= | (Italy) Alba | (United Kingdom) Cosworth | | 15 | | | 15 | | | | 30 |
| 7 | (Germany) Lotec | (Germany) BMW | | | | | | | 20 | | 20 |
| 8 | (United Kingdom) Ecosse | (United Kingdom) Cosworth | 15 | | | | | | | | 15 |
| 8= | (United Kingdom) MCS | (Japan) Mazda | | | | | | | 15 | | 15 |
| 10 | (Japan) Mazda | (Japan) Mazda | | | 10 | | | | 4 | | 14 |
| 11 | (United Kingdom) ADA | (United Kingdom) Ford | | 12 | | | | | | | 12 |
| 11= | (Germany) Gebhardt | (United States) Ford | | | | 12 | | | | | 12 |
| 12 | (United Kingdom) Ceekar | (United States) Ford | | | | 8 | | | | | 8' |
| = | (France) Sthemo | (Germany) BMW | | | | 6 | | | | | 8' |
| 14 | (United Kingdom) MCS | (Germany) BMW | | | | | | | 6 | | 6 |

=== FIA Grand Touring Cup ===
| Pos. | Manufacturer | Mon | Sil | LM | Nur | Mos | Spa | Fuj | Kya | Total |
|---|---|---|---|---|---|---|---|---|---|---|
| 1 | (Germany) BMW | 20 | 20 | 20 | 20 | | 20 | | | 100 |
| 2 | (Germany) Porsche | 15 | | 15 | 10 | | 12 | | | 52 |
