= 1984 1000 km of Spa =

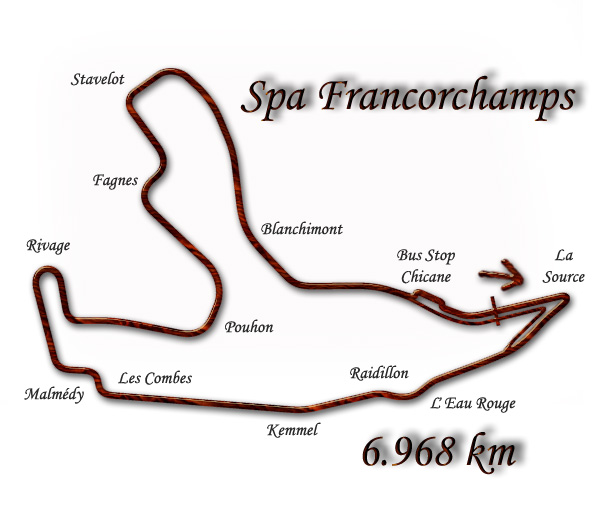
Layout of the Circuit de Spa-Francorchamps (1981–1993, 1995–2003)

The 1984 Rothmans Spa 1000 kilometers was the seventh round of the 1984 World Endurance Championship. It took place at the Circuit de Spa-Francorchamps, Belgium on 2 September 1984.

== Official results ==
Class winners in bold. Cars failing to complete 75% of the winner's distance marked as Not Classified (NC).

Pos	Class	No	Team	Drivers	Chassis	Tyre	Laps
Pos	Class	No	Team	Drivers	Engine	Tyre	Laps
1	**C1**	**2**	**(West Germany) Rothmans Porsche**	**(West Germany) Stefan Bellof (United Kingdom) Derek Bell**	**Porsche 956**	**D**	**144**
1	**C1**	**2**	**(West Germany) Rothmans Porsche**	**(West Germany) Stefan Bellof (United Kingdom) Derek Bell**	**Porsche Type-935 2.6 L Turbo Flat-6**	**D**	**144**
2	C1	1	(West Germany) Rothmans Porsche	(West Germany) Jochen Mass (Belgium) Jacky Ickx	Porsche 956	**D**	144
2	C1	1	(West Germany) Rothmans Porsche	(West Germany) Jochen Mass (Belgium) Jacky Ickx	Porsche Type-935 2.6 L Turbo Flat-6	**D**	144
