= Alba AR3 =

IMSA GTP Lights sports prototype race car

Alba AR3 Alba AR3-001 Alba AR4
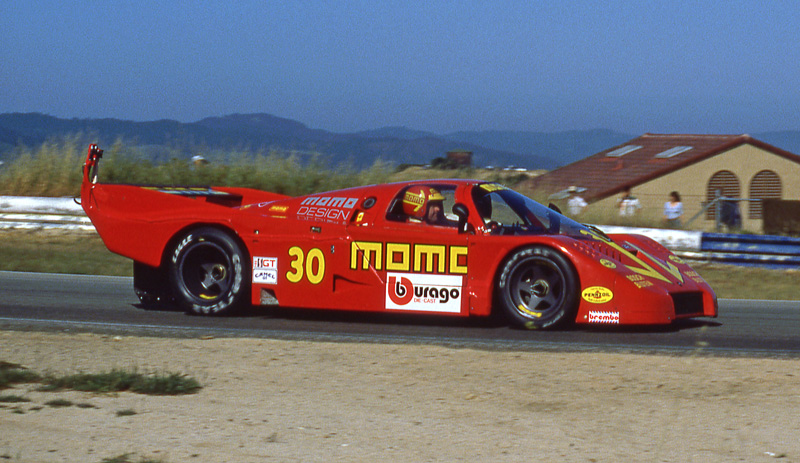
- Gianpiero Moretti driving an Alba AR3 at the 1984 IMSA Camel GT event at Laguna Seca.
- Category: IMSA GTP Lights/Group C junior (C2)
- Constructor: Alba Engineering
- Designer: Giorgio Stirano
- Predecessor: Alba AR2
- Successor: Alba AR5

Technical specifications
- Chassis: Titanium spaceframe covered in carbon fiber-kevlar composite body
- Suspension: Double wishbones, pull-rod, coil springs over shock absorbers, anti-roll bar
- Engine: Mazda/Buick/Buick/Cosworth DFV/DFL 1.3–4.5 L (79.3–274.6 cu in) 2-rotor/V6/V8, naturally-aspirated, mid-engined
- Transmission: Hewland DG 5-speed manual
- Weight: 1,700 lb (770 kg)

Competition history

The Alba AR3, and its derivative, the Alba AR3-001, were a series of ground effect IMSA GTP/Group C junior (C2) sports prototype race car, designed, developed and built by Italian manufacturer and constructor, Alba Engineering in 1984, and used in sports car racing until 1988. Its best result was two 4th-place finishes; first at Lime Rock in 1984, being driven by Gianpiero Moretti, and the second at Kyalami in 1987, being driven by Maurizio Gellini and Ranieri Randaccio. It was powered by a number of different engines, including a naturally-aspirated 4.5 L (270 cu in) Buick V6 engine, a turbocharged 4.0 L (240 cu in) Buick Indy V6 engine, a 1.3 L (79 cu in) Mazda 13B 2-rotor wankel rotary engine, a naturally-aspirated 3.0 L (180 cu in) Ford-Cosworth DFV Formula One engine, and a derived 3.3 L (200 cu in) Ford-Cosworth DFL.

An evolution of the AR3 and AR3-001, called the Alba AR4, was introduced in 1985, and used in sports car racing until 1989. It was powered by the same 1.3 L (79 cu in) Mazda 13B 2-rotor wankel rotary engine as its predecessor, and achieved 2 class wins.
