= Alba AR2 =

24 Hours of Le Mans race cars

The Alba AR2 was a Group C junior sports car prototype, designed, developed and built by Italian manufacturer Alba Engineering in 1983, and used in sports car racing until 1995.

== Development history and technology ==
Alba Engineering was founded in 1983 by Giorgio Stirano, who had worked for Osella as a chassis engineer for many years. In the same year, he was commissioned by wealthy Italian racing driver and industrialist Martino Finotto to design and build two racing cars for the new Group C junior class. Finotto wanted to use the cars together with his friend Carlo Facetti in the sports car world championship. Two carbon fiber reinforced plastic monocoques were created under the direction of Stirano. The engine was developed in the CARMA company run by Finotto and Facetti. The 1.8 L (110 cu in) 4-cylinder turbo engine, that initially made 410 hp. Since the FIA only allowed engine manufacturers to register with it in the world championship, which CARMA was not, a contract was quickly concluded with Giannini Automobili and the engine was given the name Giannini Carma FF in 1984.

Since the AR2 was well above the weight limit in 1984, the chassis was revised in early 1985. The vehicles received bodies made of synthetic resin reinforced with aramid and carbon fibers and new chassis parts made of titanium. The amazingly stable engine was also improved and made 338 kW (460 hp) in 1985. The cars were used by the Italian Jolly Club team, which was closely connected to Finotto.

== Racing History ==
=== 1983 ===
After the Jolly Club AR2 was registered for the 1000 km race in Monza, but could not yet be used for technical reasons - Finotto and Facetti then drove the works Osella PA9 together with Carlo Franchi in this race - that was the case Race debut at the Silverstone 1000 km race. The first outing ended with a superior class victory for Finotto and Facetti. The much faster Group C cars were down by more than 10 seconds per lap, but the car proved fast and stable. However, in the C-Junior class alongside the AR2 with the Mazda 717C by Yōjirō Terada and Peter Lovett and a Harrier RX83C, only two other racers were reported, the latter not even starting.

The race on the Nordschleife of the Nürburgring also ended with a clear class win. At the most important long-distance race of the year, the Le Mans 24-hour race, there was no finish line. After 158 laps – the third driver was the Swiss Marco Vanoli alongside Finotto and Facetti – broken chassis parts were found during a pit stop and the racing car was taken out of the race.

After another retirement at the 1000 km race at Spa-Francorchamps, this time due to engine failure, Finotto and Facetti celebrated a superior class win with tenth place overall at the 1000 km race at Brands Hatch. After another class victory at the Fuji 1000 km race, the second chassis, which has since been completed, was also used at the Imola 1000 km race. This car drove in Imola Fulvio Ballabio and Guido Daccò. Both cars failed; Facetti/Finotto's AR2 had an electrical fault, and Ballabio and Daccò retired due to engine failure.

After the failure of Facetti, Finotto, and Daccò at the Mugello 1000 km race, a 12th place in the final and another class victory at the last race of the season, the Kyalami 1000 km race, was enough to win the world championship in group C -Junior class. The third driver next to Facetti and Finotto in this race was the Italian Massimo Faraci.

=== 1984 ===
In 1984, the Jolly Club team consistently used both chassis in the sports car world championship, in which class C-Junior became class C2. At the first race of the year, the 1000 km race of Monza, Facetti, and Finotto (chassis 002) had to compete behind Jim Busby and Rick Knoop in the Lola T616 and Ray Mallock, Mike Wilds and David Duffield on an Ecosse C284 be content with third place in the class, which also corresponded to eleventh place overall.

Although the competition in the small Group C class was much higher than in the previous year, the team and thus the manufacturer Alba secured the world championship title again. Outstanding results were achieved in the Mosport 1000 km race. Guido Daccò and Almo Coppelli finished third overall, behind the works Porsche of Jacky Ickx and Jochen Mass and another Porsche 956 driven by David Hobbs, Rupert Keegan, and Franz Konrad. Carlo Facetti, Martino Finotto, and Alfredo Sebastini finished the race in sixth place overall.

=== 1985-1995 ===
From 1985, the successor models AR3, AR4, AR5, and AR6 were used in international sports car races and the AR2 made fewer appearances. Class victories could no longer be achieved with the racing car type. The best result in 1985 was eighth place overall by Facetti, Finotto, and Daccò at the Mugello 1000 km race.

In late 1985 a third chassis was identified, given chassis number 004, and sold to the United States. This car had several team owners and was largely unsuccessful in racing in North America. The best placement was second place by Giampiero Moretti at the IMSA Light Race in Miami in 1986. His last race was an AR2 at the 3-hour race at Mosport in 1995, where Guido Daccò finished 23rd overall with Canadian Uli Bieri.
