= Tiga GC84 =

Sports prototype race car

Tiga GC84 (Tiga GC284)
- Category: Group C1/C2

Technical specifications
- Chassis: Aluminum honeycomb monocoque, fiberglass body
- Suspension: Double wishbones, rocker actuated coil springs and shock absorbers, anti-roll bar (front); Double wishbones, coil springs over shock absorbers, anti-roll bar (rear)
- Length: 4,750 mm (187 in)
- Width: 1,896 mm (74.6 in)
- Axle track: 1,600 mm (63 in) (front); 1,499 mm (59.0 in) (rear)
- Wheelbase: 2,550 mm (100 in)
- Engine: Ford-Cosworth DFL 3.3–3.9 L (201.4–238.0 cu in) 90° DOHC V8 naturally-aspirated mid-engined Ford-Cosworth DFV 3.0 L (183.1 cu in) 90° DOHC V8 naturally-aspirated mid-engined
- Transmission: Hewland 5-speed manual
- Power: ~ 490 hp (370 kW)
- Weight: 798 kg (1,759 lb)
- Tires: Avon; Dunlop

Competition history
- Debut: 1984 1000 km of Silverstone

The Tiga GC84, also known as the Tiga GC284, is a sports prototype race car, designed, developed, and built by British manufacturer Tiga Race Cars, for sports car racing, conforming to the Group C1/C2 rules and regulations, in 1984.
