= 1984 12 Hours of Sebring =

Sports car endurance race

The Coca-Cola Classic Twelve Hours of Sebring, was the third round of the 1984 IMSA GT Championship and was held at the Sebring International Raceway, on March 24, 1984. Victory overall went to the No. 48 De Narvaez Enterprises Porsche 935 driven by Mauricio de Narvaez, Stefan Johansson, and Hans Heyer.

== Race results ==
Class winners in bold.

Pos	Class	No	Team	Drivers	Car	Laps
1	**GTP**	**48**	**(Colombia) De Narvaez Enterprises**	**(Colombia) Mauricio de Narváez (Sweden) Stefan Johansson (Germany) Hans Heyer**	**Porsche 935**	**263**
2	GTP	57	(United States) Blue Thunder Racing Team	(United States) Randy Lanier (United States) Bill Whittington (United States) Marty Hinze	March 83G	261
3	GTP	6	(United States) Henn's Swap Shop	(United Kingdom) Derek Bell (United States) A. J. Foyt (France) Bob Wollek	Porsche 935	258
4	GTP	9	(United States) Hino Truck	(United States) Wayne Baker (United States) Jim Mullen (United States) Tom Blackaller	Porsche 935 K3	258
5	GTP	5	(United States) Bob Akin Motor Racing	(United States) Bob Akin (United States) John O'Steen (Germany) Hans-Joachim Stuck	Porsche 935	256
6	GTP	14	(United Kingdom) John Fitzpatrick Racing	(France) Bob Wollek (Canada) John Graham (United States) Hugo Gralia (United States) Preston Henn (United States) Al Holbert	Porsche 935	246
7	GTP	45	(United States) Conte Racing	(United States) John Morton (United States) Tony Garcia (United States) Tony Adamowicz	Lola T600	244
8	**GTO**	**4**	**(United States) Stratagraph Inc.**	**(United States) Billy Hagan (United States) Gene Felton (United States) Terry Labonte**	**Chevrolet Camaro**	**243**
9	**GTU**	**76**	**(United States) Malibu Grand Prix**	**(United States) Jack Baldwin (United States) Ira Young (United States) Bob Reed**	**Mazda RX-7**	**238**
10	GTU	32	(United States) Alderman Datsun	(United States) George Alderman (United States) Carson Baird (United States) Lew Price	Datsun 280ZX	234
11	GTP	04	(United States) Group 44	(United Kingdom) Brian Redman (United States) Pat Bedard	Jaguar XJR-5	234
12	GTU	7	(United States) E. J. Pruitt & Sons	(United States) Ren Tilton (United States) Blake Pridgen (United States) Rusty Bond	Porsche 911	234
13	GTU	17	(United States) Al Bacon Racing	(United States) Al Bacon (United States) Charles Guest	Mazda RX-7	222
14	GTU	51	(United States) Chris Wilder	(United States) Van McDonald (United States) Dennis DeFranceschi	Porsche 911	222
15	GTU	71	(United States) THR Foreign Car	(United States) John Higgins (United States) James King (United States) Howard Cherry	Porsche 911	221
16	GTU	23	(United States) Roe-Selby Racing	(United States) Tim Selby (United States) Earl Roe	Porsche 914-6 GT	221
17	GTO	38	(United States) Mandeville Auto/Tech	(United States) Roger Mandeville (United States) Amos Johnson (United States) Danny Smith	Mazda RX-7	221
18	GTO	68	(Dominican Republic) Luis Mendez Racing	(Dominican Republic) Luis Mendez (Puerto Rico) Chiqui Soldevilla (Dominican Republic) Chris Marte	Porsche 911 Carrera RSR	217
19	GTU	93	(United States) Mid-O Racing	(United States) Don Marsh (United States) Ron Pawley (United States) Kelly Marsh (United States) Whitney Ganz	Porsche 935	216
20	GTP	05	(United States) Hi-Tech Racing	(United States) Tico Almeida (Cuba) Miguel Morejon	Porsche 935	216
21	GTO	62	(United States) Tim Morgan	(United States) Tim Morgan (United States) Peter Morgan (United States) Charles Bair (United States) Marcus Opie	Chevrolet Camaro	215
22	GTU	28	(United States) Budweiser Racing	(United States) John Jellinek (United States) Stefan Edlis (United States) Tom Brennan	Porsche 924 Carrera GTR	212
23	GTP	97	(United States) Tide & Mosler Racing	(United States) Tom Shelton (United States) Steve Shelton (France) Claude Ballot-Léna (United States) John McComb	Ferrari 512 BB	211
24	GTU	82	(United States) Trinity Racing	(United States) Lee Mueller (United States) Terry Visger (United States) John Casey	Mazda RX-7	208
25	GTU	10	(United States) Dave White Racing	(United States) Dave White (United States) George Drolsom (United States) Jerry Kendall	Porsche 924 Carrera GTR	202
26 DNF	GTU	0	(United States) Case Racing	(United States) Ron Case (United States) Dave Panaccione	Porsche 911	186
27	GTO	01	(United States) THR Foreign Car	(United States) George Hulse (United States) Jerry Kennedy (United States) Mike Cheung	Porsche 911 Carrera RSR	183
28	GTO	21	(United States) Oftedahl Racing	(Canada) Craig Allen (Canada) George Schwarz (Canada) Andre Schwartz	Pontiac Firebird	181
29	GTO	26	(United States) Steve Roberts	(United States) William Boyer (United States) Steve Roberts	Chevrolet Camaro	181
30	GTO	43	(United States) Walker Brown Racing	(Colombia) Diego Montoya (United States) Brian Goellnicht (Republic of Ireland) Michael Roe	BMW M1	180
31	GTO	40	(Canada) Bieri Racing	(Canada) Uli Bieri (Canada) Matt Gysler (Switzerland) Angelo Pallavicini	BMW M1	177
32	GTO	67	(United States) Shafer Concrete	(United States) George Shafer (United States) Craig Shafer (United States) Joe Maloy	Chevrolet Camaro	170
33 DNF	GTO	09	(United States) Van Every Racing	(United States) Lance van Every (United States) Ash Tisdelle	Porsche 911 Carrera RSR	169
34 DNF	GTO	46	(United States) Classic Motor Car	(United States) Frank Jellinek (United States) Paul Fassler (United States) Jerry Molnar	Pontiac Firebird	167
35	GTO	99	(United States) Comp Fibreglass	(United States) Phil Currin (United States) Steve Gentile (United States) Jim Cook (United States) Tommy Morrison	Chevrolet Corvette	161
36 DNF	GTP	25	(United States) Red Lobster Racing	(United States) Dave Cowart (United States) Kenper Miller	March 82G	158
37	GTO	94	(United States) Tangent Racing	(United States) Bill Gardner (United States) James Durovy	Pontiac Firebird	149
38 DNF	GTP	15	(United States) Kalagian/Ardisana	(United States) John Kalagian (United States) John Lloyd	Lola T600	148
39 DNF	GTU	13	(United States) Rubino Racing	(United States) Frank Rubino (United States) Jose Rodriguez (United States) David Leira	Mazda RX-7	146
40	GTO	83	(United States) K & P Racing	(United States) Karl Keck (United States) Robert Whitaker (United States) William Wessel	Chevrolet Corvette	138
41 DNF	GTO	90	(United States) Bob's Speed Products	(United States) Bob Lee (United States) Gary Myers (United States) Bill Julian	Buick Skyhawk	137
42 DNF	GTP	31	(United States) Import Service Center	(United States) Larry O'Brien (United States) Mike van Steenburg	Mazda OVS-1	137
43 DNF	GTP	00	(South Africa) Kreepy Krauly Racing	(South Africa) Sarel van der Merwe (South Africa) Graham Duxbury (South Africa) Tony Martin	March 83G	134
44 DNF	GTP	86	(United States) Bayside - Lowenbrau	(United States) Al Holbert (France) Claude Ballot-Léna (United States) Hurley Haywood	Porsche 935	123
45 DNF	GTU	60	(United States) Roserace/Morrison	(United States) Dennis Krueger (United States) Tom Henrickson (United States) Rick Kinner	Mazda RX-7	114
46 DNF	GTP	44	(United States) Group 44	(United States) Bob Tullius (United States) Doc Bundy	Jaguar XJR-5	114
47 DNF	GTP	41	(United States) Silver Lake Plantation	(United States) Gary Belcher (France) Jean Rondeau (United States) John Gunn	Rondeau M382	109
48 DNF	GTU	84	(United States) Dole Racing	(United States) Clay Young (United States) Doug Grunnet (United States) Jim Burt	Pontiac Fiero	105
49 DNF	GTO	11	(United States) Kreider Racing	(United States) Dale Kreider (United States) Roy Newsome (United States) Bobby Diehl	Chevrolet Camaro	103
50 DNF	GTP	24	(United States) Pegasus Racing	(United States) M. L. Speer (United States) Jack Griffin	Porsche 935	96
51 DNF	GTO	88	(United States) Motorsports Marketing	(United States) Ken Murray (United States) Russ Boy (United States) Richard Valentine	Chevrolet Camaro	95
52 DNF	GTO	95	(Puerto Rico) Pennzoil de P. R.	(Puerto Rico) Luis Gordillo (Puerto Rico) Eduardo Salguero (Puerto Rico) Manuel Villa	Porsche 911 Carrera RSR	71
53 DNF	GTU	69	(United States) George Shafer	(United States) John Hofstra (United States) Peter Uria (United States) Mick Robinson	Porsche 911	69
54 DNF	GTU	27	(United States) Scuderia Rosso	(United States) Jim Fowells (United States) Ray Mummery (United States) Steve Potter	Mazda RX-7	65
55 DNF	GTP	18	(El Salvador) Team Fomfor Racing	(Switzerland) Max Welti (El Salvador) "Fomfor" (El Salvador) Willy Valiente	Sauber C7	63
56 DNF	GTU	55	(United States) Preston & Son	(United States) Whitney Ganz (United States) Gene Hackman	Mazda RX-7	59
57 DNF	GTP	2	(United States) Leon Bros. Racing	(United States) Al Leon (United States) Art Leon (United States) Terry Wolters	March 84G	56
58 DNF	GTU	79	(United States) Whitehall Promotions	(United States) Tom Winters (United States) Bob Bergstrom (Canada) Bill Adam	Porsche 924 Carrera GTR	52
59 DNF	GTU	42	(United States) Gary Wonzer	(United States) Buzz Cason (United States) Peter Uria (United States) Gary Wonzer	Porsche 911	49
60 DNF	GTP	3	(United States) Pegasus Racing	(United States) Ken Madren (United States) M. L. Speer (United States) Wayne Pickering	March 84G	44
61 DNF	GTO	35	(United States) G & H Development	(United States) Worth Williams (United States) Jim Leeward (United States) Steve Zwiren	Porsche 911 Carrera RSR	43
62 DNF	GTO	47	(United States) Dingman Brothers Racing	(United States) Billy Dingman (United States) Walt Bohren	Chevrolet Corvette	43
63 DNF	GTU	58	El Salvador Racing	(United States) Alfredo Mena (United States) Jim Trueman (United States) Deborah Gregg	Porsche 924 Carrera GTR	40
64 DNF	GTP	30	(United States) Tim Chitwood	(United States) Tim Chitwood (United States) Joe Llauget (United States) Jose Rios	Chevrolet Monte Carlo	38
65 DNF	GTU	78	(United States) Der Klaus Haus	(United States) Klaus Bitterauf (United States) Vicki Smith (United States) Arvid Albanese	Porsche 911	37
66 DNF	GTP	61	(United States) Deco Sales	(United States) Don Courtney (United States) Brent O'Neill (United States) Steve Shelton	Argo JM16	36
67 DNF	GTO	85	(El Salvador) Latino Racing	(Costa Rica) Kikos Fonseca (El Salvador) "Jamsal" (Puerto Rico) Diego Febles	Porsche 911 Carrera RSR	32
68 DNF	GTU	66	(United States) Mike Meyer Racing	(United States) Jack Dunham (United States) Paul Lewis (United States) Jeff Kline	Mazda RX-7	25
69 DNF	GTO	64	(United States) John Hulen	(United States) Ron Coupland (United States) John Hulen (United States) Dan Hartill	Porsche 911 Carrera RSR	25
70 DNF	GTO	22	(United States) Walter Johnston	(United States) Larry Figaro (Brazil) Fernando Sabino	Pontiac Firebird	25
71 DNF	GTP	16	(United States) Hinze Fencing	(United States) Marty Hinze	March 82G	22
72 DNF	GTO	77	(United States) Sunrise Auto Parts	(United States) Jeff Loving (United States) Richard Small	Chevrolet Camaro	20
73 DNF	GTU	03	(United States) DiLella Racing	(United States) Vince DiLella (United States) Manuel Cueto	Porsche 911	19
74 DNF	GTP	63	(United States) RGP 500 Racing	(United States) John Maffucci (United States) Jim Downing	Argo JM16	17
75 DNF	GTO	20	(United States) Paul Canary Racing	(United States) Paul Canary (United States) Bob Barnett	Chevrolet Corvette	17
76 DNF	GTU	37	(United States) Vero Racing	(United States) Peter Welter (United States) Tom Burdsall (United States) Nort Northam	Mazda RX-7	16
77 DNF	GTO	56	(United States) Coin Operated Racing	(United States) Rick Borlase (United States) Michael Hammond (United States) Don Kravig	Porsche 934	12
78 DNF	GTO	33	(United States) John McComb	(United States) John McComb (United States) Paul Pettey	Jaguar XJS	6
79 DNF	GTP	49	(United States) Paul Goral	(United States) Paul Goral (United Kingdom) John Hayes-Harlow	Porsche 935	5
80 DNF	GTU	87	(United States) Performance Motorsports	(United States) Elliot Forbes-Robinson (United States) John Schneider	Porsche 924 Carrera GTR	4
81 DNF	GTO	52	(United States) OMR Engines	(United States) Hoyt Overbagh (United States) Robert Theall (United States) Peter Kirill	Chevrolet Camaro	4
DNS	GTP	8	(United States) Paul Canary Racing	(United States) Paul Canary (Canada) Eppie Wietzes	McLaren M12	0
DNS	GTO	19	(United States) Signal 12 Racing	(United States) Jimmy Tumbleston (United States) Bobby Dumont	AMC Spirit	0
DNS	GTU	34	(United States) Florco Design	(United States) Donald Flores (United States) Tom Turner	Lotus Europa	0
DNS	GTO	53	(United States) Dan Nooe	(United States) Dan Nooe (United States) Gale O'Doski	Chevrolet Corvette	0
DNS	GTP	65	(United States) Richard Habersin	(United States) Rick Habersin (United States) Bob Murray	Chevrolet Camaro	0
DNS	GTU	91	(United States) B & G Racing	(United States) Charles W. Bryant (United States) Richard Burr (United States) Mike Graham	BMW 2002	0
DNS	GTU	92	(Trinidad and Tobago) Amar Racing Team	(Trinidad and Tobago) Robert Amar (Trinidad and Tobago) Ashmeed Mohammed	Toyota Corolla	0
DNS	GTP	96	(United States) Tide & Mosler Racing	(France) Claude Ballot-Léna	Ferrari 512 BB	0
DNS	GTO	98	(Colombia) Sesana Racing	(Colombia) Alfredo Sesana (Colombia) Jorge Cortes	Chevrolet Monza	0

=== Class Winners ===
Class	Winners	
GTP	De Narvaez / Johansson / Heyer	Porsche 935
GTO	Hagan / Felton / Labonte	Chevrolet Camaro
GTU	Baldwin / Young / Reed	Mazda RX-7
