= 1984 IMSA GT Championship =

14th season of the racing series organized by IMSA

Seasons
- ← 1983 1985 →

The 1984 Camel GT Championship season was the 14th season of the IMSA GT Championship auto racing series. It was for GTP class prototypes and GTO and GTU class Grand Tourer-style racing cars. It began February 4, 1984, and ended November 25, 1984, after seventeen rounds.

== Schedule ==
The GT and Prototype classes did not participate in all events, nor did they race together at shorter events. Races marked with All had all classes on track at the same time.

Rnd	Race	Length	Class	Circuit	Date
1	SunBank 24 at Daytona	24 Hours	All	Daytona International Speedway	February 4 February 5
2	Budweiser Grand Prix of Miami	3 Hours	GTP	Streets of Miami	February 26
2	Budweiser Grand Prix of Miami	45 Minutes	GTO	Streets of Miami	February 26
2	Budweiser Grand Prix of Miami	45 Minutes	GTU	Streets of Miami	February 26
3	Coca-Cola Classic 12 Hours of Sebring	12 Hours	All	Sebring International Raceway	March 24
4	Road Atlanta 500	500 km	All	Road Atlanta	April 8
5	Los Angeles Times/Nissan Grand Prix	6 Hours	All	Riverside International Raceway	April 29
6	Red Lobster Monterey Triple Crown	45 Minutes	GTO/GTU	Laguna Seca Raceway	May 6
6	Red Lobster Monterey Triple Crown	100 Miles	GTP	Laguna Seca Raceway	May 6
7	Charlotte Camel GT 500	500 km	All	Charlotte Motor Speedway	May 20
8	Coca-Cola 500	45 Minutes	GTO	Lime Rock Park	May 28
8	Coca-Cola 500	45 Minutes	GTU	Lime Rock Park	May 28
8	Coca-Cola 500	1 Hour	GTP	Lime Rock Park	May 28
9	Lumbermen's 500	500 km	All	Mid-Ohio Sports Car Course	June 10
10	Camel Continental Double Three-Hour	3 Hours (twice)	All	Watkins Glen International	July 8
11	G.I. Joe's Grand Prix	30 Minutes	GTU	Portland International Raceway	July 28
11	G.I. Joe's Grand Prix	3 Hours	GTP/GTO	Portland International Raceway	July 29
12	Ford California Grand Prix	100 Miles	GTP	Sears Point Raceway	August 5
12	Ford California Grand Prix	75 Miles	GTO/GTU	Sears Point Raceway	August 5
13	Budweiser Classic	500 Miles	All	Road America	August 26
14	Grand Prix at Pocono	500 km	All	Pocono Raceway	September 9
15	Michigan 500k	100 km	GTU	Michigan International Speedway	September 15
15	Michigan 500k	500 km	GTP/GTO	Michigan International Speedway	September 16
16	New York 500	500 km	All	Watkins Glen International	September 30
17	Eastern Airlines 3 Hours of Daytona	3 Hours	All	Daytona International Speedway	November 25

== Season results ==
Rnd	Circuit	GTP Winning Team	GTO Winning Team	GTU Winning Team	Results
Rnd	Circuit	GTP Winning Drivers	GTO Winning Drivers	GTU Winning Drivers	Results
1	Daytona	(South Africa) #00 Kreepy Krauly Racing	(United States) #4 Stratagraph Inc.	(United States) #76 Malibu Grand Prix	Results
1	Daytona	(South Africa) Sarel van der Merwe (South Africa) Graham Duxbury (South Africa) Tony Martin	(United States) Terry Labonte (United States) Billy Hagan (United States) Gene Felton	(United States) Jack Baldwin (United States) Jim Cook (United States) Ira Young (United States) Bob Reed	Results
2	Miami	(United States) #04 Group 44	(United States) #47 Dingman Bros. Racing	(United States) #99 All American Racers	Results
2	Miami	(United States) Doc Bundy (United Kingdom) Brian Redman	(United States) Walt Bohren	(United States) Chris Cord	Results
3	Sebring	(Colombia) #48 DeNarvaez Enterprises	(United States) #4 Stratagraph Inc.	(United States) #76 Malibu Grand Prix	Results
3	Sebring	(Colombia) Mauricio DeNarvaez (Germany) Hans Heyer (Sweden) Stefan Johansson	(United States) Terry Labonte (United States) Billy Hagan (United States) Gene Felton	(United States) Jack Baldwin (United States) Bob Reed (United States) Ira Young	Results
4	Road Atlanta	(United States) #16 Marty Hinze Racing	(United States) #4 Stratagraph Inc.	(United States) #76 Malibu Grand Prix	Results
4	Road Atlanta	(United States) Don Whittington	(United States) Billy Hagan (United States) Gene Felton	(United States) Jack Baldwin (United States) Bob Reed	Results
5	Riverside	(United States) #56 Blue Thunder Racing	(United States) #38 Mandeville Auto Tech	(United States) #87 Performance Motorsports	Results
5	Riverside	(United States) Bill Whittington (United States) Randy Lanier	(United States) Roger Mandeville (United States) Amos Johnson	(United States) Elliot Forbes-Robinson (United States) John Schneider	Results
6	Laguna Seca	(United States) #56 Blue Thunder Racing	(United States) #77 Brooks Racing	(United States) #99 All American Racers	Results
6	Laguna Seca	(United States) Randy Lanier	(United States) John Bauer	(United States) Jim Adams	Results
7	Charlotte	(United States) #56 Blue Thunder Racing	(United States) #4 Stratagraph Inc.	(United States) #99 All American Racers	Results
7	Charlotte	(United States) Bill Whittington (United States) Randy Lanier	(United States) Billy Hagan (United States) Gene Felton	(United States) Chris Cord (United States) Jim Adams	Results
8	Lime Rock	(South Africa) #00 Kreepy Krauly Racing	(United States) #38 Mandeville Auto Tech	(United States) #76 Malibu Grand Prix	Results
8	Lime Rock	(South Africa) Sarel van der Merwe	(United States) Roger Mandeville	(United States) Jack Baldwin	Results
9	Mid-Ohio	(United States) #14 Holbert Racing	(United States) #91 Electrodyne	(United States) #66 Mike Meyer Racing	Results
9	Mid-Ohio	(United States) Al Holbert (United Kingdom) Derek Bell	(United States) Chester Vincentz (United States) Dave White	(United States) Jack Dunham (United States) Jeff Kline	Results
10	Watkins Glen	(United States) #14 Holbert Racing	(United States) #91 Electrodyne	(United States) #87 Performance Motorsports	Results
10	Watkins Glen	(United States) Al Holbert (United States) Jim Adams (United Kingdom) Derek Bell	(United States) Chester Vincentz (United States) Jim Mullen	(United States) Elliot Forbes-Robinson (United States) John Schneider	Results
11	Portland	(United States) #56 Blue Thunder Racing	(United States) #51 Corvette	(United States) #76 Malibu Grand Prix	Results
11	Portland	(United States) Bill Whittington (United States) Randy Lanier	(United States) David Schroeder (United States) Tom Hendrickson	(United States) Jack Baldwin	Results
12	Sears Point	(United States) #56 Blue Thunder Racing	(United States) #77 Brooks Racing	(United States) #98 All American Racers	Results
12	Sears Point	(United States) Bill Whittington	(United States) John Bauer	(United States) Dennis Aase	Results
13	Road America	(United States) #14 Holbert Racing	(United States) #91 Electrodyne	(United States) #66 Mike Meyer Racing	Results
13	Road America	(United States) Al Holbert (United Kingdom) Derek Bell	(United States) Chester Vincentz (United States) Jim Mullen	(United States) Jack Dunham (United States) Jeff Kline	Results
14	Pocono	(United States) #14 Holbert Racing	(United States) #65 English Enterprises	(United States) #87 Performance Motorsports	Results
14	Pocono	(United States) Al Holbert (United Kingdom) Derek Bell	(United States) Gene Felton	(United States) Elliot Forbes-Robinson (United States) John Schneider	Results
15	Michigan	(United States) #56 Blue Thunder Racing	(United States) #91 Electrodyne	(United States) #84 Dole Racing	Results
15	Michigan	(United States) Bill Whittington (United States) Randy Lanier	(United States) Chester Vincentz (United States) Jim Mullen	(United States) Clay Young	Results
16	Watkins Glen	(United States) #57 Blue Thunder Racing	(United States) #91 Electrodyne	(United States) #84 Dole Racing	Results
16	Watkins Glen	(United States) Dale Whittington (United States) Randy Lanier	(United States) Chester Vincentz (United States) Jim Mullen	(United States) Clay Young	Results
17	Daytona	(United States) #14 Holbert Racing	(United States) #67 Roush Racing	(United States) #87 Performance Motorsports	Results
17	Daytona	(United States) Al Holbert (United Kingdom) Derek Bell	(United States) Wally Dallenbach Jr. (United States) Willy T. Ribbs	(United States) Elliot Forbes-Robinson (United States) John Schneider	Results
