= Lola T616 =

Group C2 racing car prototype

Lola T-616
- Category: Group C2, IMSA GTP
- Constructor: Lola
- Designer: Eric Broadley
- Production: 1983
- Predecessor: Lola T600

Technical specifications
- Chassis: Carbon-fibre monocoque with aluminium honeycomb structure
- Suspension (front): Independent unequal length A-arms, Bilstein coilover gas shock absorbers with adjustable 1.5" twin-blade anti-sway bar
- Suspension (rear): As front, except single lower control arm and 1" twin-blade anti-sway bar
- Length: 4,707 mm (185.3 in)
- Width: 1,994 mm (78.5 in)
- Height: 991 mm (39.0 in)
- Axle track: 1,511 mm (59.5 in) (front); 1,537 mm (60.5 in) (rear)
- Wheelbase: 2,642 mm (104 in)
- Engine: Mazda 13B 2-rotor 1,308 cc (79.8 cu in) naturally aspirated rotary
- Torque: 182 lb⋅ft (247 N⋅m) @ 8,500 rpm
- Transmission: 5-speed Hewland FGB-400 with limited-slip differential
- Power: 300 hp (304 PS; 224 kW) @ 8,500 rpm
- Weight: 700 kg (1,543 lb)
- Brakes: Ventilated discs with Lockheed magnesium calipers and Ferodo pads
- Tyres: BFGoodrich T/A radial, 275/35VR13 front, 385/35VR13 rear BBS three-piece centre-locking wheels, 13" by 11" front, 13" by 14" rear
- Clutch: AP Racing twin-plate

Competition history
- Notable entrants: (United States) BFGoodrich Racing (United States) Polimotor Research
- Notable drivers: (United States) Jim Busby; (United States) John Morton; (United States) John O'Steen; (United States) Rick Knoop; (United States) Pete Halsmer; (United States) Peter Kuhn; (Netherlands) Johan "Boy" Hayje; (Japan) Yoshimi Katayama; (Austria) Dieter Quester
- Debut: 1984 24 Hours of Daytona
Races	Wins	Poles	F/Laps
7	2	1	0

The Lola T616 is a sports prototype built by Lola Cars to the Group C2 and IMSA GTP regulations. It was built with the intention to compete in the IMSA GT Championship and the World Sportscar Championship, and became the second Mazda-powered prototype to score a class win at the 24 Hours of Le Mans after the 717C triumphed in the same C2 class at the 1983 24 Hours of Le Mans.

== Background ==
The T616's predecessor, the Lola T600, was the first sports prototype to utilise ground effect, a feature that was also included on the T616. The T600 won IMSA titles in 1981 and 1982, but later on the T600's lack of competitiveness and the introduction of the Group C2 regulations spurred Lola to build derivatives of the T600, the T610 and the T616. The T616 was designed with the intent of fitting smaller engines as stipulated by the Group C2 regulations, with Jim Busby replacing the T600's 6.0 L (366.1 cu in) Chevrolet V8 with a twin-rotor 1,308 cc (79.8 cu in) rotary, the 13B. The T600's carbon-fibre reinforced aluminium honeycomb structure monocoque was retained in the T616, and the engine acted as a semi-stressed member along with two tubular frames mounted across the cockpit.

== Specifications ==
Mazda's 13B engine was equipped with a twin-spark ignition system provided by Mitsubishi that allowed for better combustion quality, along with Bosch mechanical fuel injection gave the engine an output of 300 hp (304 PS; 224 kW) and 182 lb⋅ft (247 N⋅m) @ 8,500 rpm. Lubrication was provided by a dry sump system, and the engine was cooled by a vane pump fed with water. The T616 also had two different fuel tanks, one for the IMSA GT Championship that had a capacity of 120 L (31.7 US gal), and a 55 L (14.5 US gal) tank for the World Sportscar Championship. The car's ride height was controlled by outboard A-arms at the front, and outboard control arms at the rear. The suspension was constructed in such a way that the springs and Bilstein gas dampers were situated on top the crossbeam, meaning that the flow of the air through the underbody Venturi tunnels was largely undisturbed. Pete Halsmer remarked that the car was a "handful to drive", with poor handling, and the "weight distribution left something to be desired."

Of the four T616 chassis built by Lola, three were fitted with Mazda's 13B rotary, and one was fitted with a plastic engine, Matty Holtzberg's Polimotor. The Polimotor incorporated large amounts of a thermoplastic called Torlon, manufactured by Amoco, who was also the title sponsor of Holtzberg's T616. The initial prototype, built in 1979, was based on Ford's LL23 inline-four, and much of the timing structure along with the connecting rods were injection moulded from Torlon. The crankshaft and camshaft, among other components, remained as original Ford parts. The use of plastic gave Holtzberg's Polimotor a weight of 76.2 kg (168 lb), 28.6 kg (63 lb) less than the Mazda 13B rotary.

By 1982, Holtzberg's Polimotor had further enhancements such as dual overhead camshafts, which meant that the engine produced 300 hp (224 kW; 304 PS) and weighed 69 kg (152 lb). Holtzberg campaigned his Polimotor-powered T616 in the 1984 and 1985 seasons of the IMSA GT Championship, with his sole engine-related retirement coming as a result of a metal connecting rod failure. Holtzberg's campaign did not continue due to the lack of funding to help further develop his engine.

== Racing history ==
Jim Busby chose not to run a full season in the 1984 IMSA GT Championship, opting to only compete at the bigger races, the 24 Hours of Daytona, the Grand Prix of Miami, the 6 Hours of Riverside, the Mid-Ohio 500, and the 6 Hours of Watkins Glen. The T616 made its racing debut at the opening round of the 1984 IMSA GT Championship at Daytona under the BFGoodrich Racing banner, where the No. 68 driven by Pete Halsmer, Dieter Quester, Ron Grable and Rick Knoop placed 11th in the GTP class (17th overall), and the sister No. 67 of Jim Busby, Rick Knoop and Boy Hayje didn't make it to the flag, having stopped on lap 391 with a blown engine, and was classified 31st overall. A double points finish was the team's result at the 1984 3 Hours of Miami, with the No. 67 and No.68 finishing sixth and fifth, respectively. The two cars were then flown over to Europe to compete in the season-opener of the 1984 World Sportscar Championship, the 1984 1000 km of Monza, where they posted their best finish of the season with the No. 67 and No. 68 taking first and fifth in the C2 class, respectively. Car No. 67 returned to the United States briefly for the 1984 6 Hours of Riverside, where it placed 39th.

It reunited with its sister car for the 1984 24 Hours of Le Mans, where Mazda's factory racing division, Mazdaspeed, had also entered a pair of Mazda 727Cs. The factory 727Cs were significantly faster than Busby's T616s, posting lap times almost ten seconds quicker in practice. The T616 made up for their lack of pace with reliability; the factory 727Cs were overcome with gearbox troubles that cost them significant amounts of time. All four cars finished, with Busby's No. 68 car driven by John Morton, John O'Steen and Yoshimi Katayama in first position in the C2 class, and himself in third in class alongside co-drivers Rick Knoop and Boy Hayje in the No. 67. The factory 727Cs, despite their pace, finished fourth and sixth in class.

By the end of 1984, Lola withdrew factory support for all T600 variants, including the T616, due to their lack of competitiveness with the quickly changing GTP class in IMSA, and instead focus their efforts on the Chevrolet Corvette GTP. Holtzberg moved to the inaugural GTP Lights class for 1985, posting several points-scoring class finishes, including a third place at the 1985 2 Hours of Lime Rock.

== Racing record ==
=== Complete IMSA GT Championship results ===
(key) Races in bold indicates pole position. Races in italics indicates fastest lap.

Complete IMSA GT Championship results
Year	Entrant	Class	Drivers	No.	Rds.	Rounds																
Year	Entrant	Class	Drivers	No.	Rds.	1	2	3	4	5	6	7	8	9	10	11	12	13	14	15	16	17
1984	(United States) BF Goodrich	GTP	(United States) Jim Busby (United States) Rick Knoop (Netherlands) Boy Hayje (United States) Ron Grable (United States) Pete Halsmer	67	1–2, 5, 9–10; 1–2, 5, 9; 1; 5; 9	DAY; Ret	MIA; 6			RIV; Ret				MOH; 8	WGL; 5							
1984	(United States) BF Goodrich	GTP	(United States) Pete Halsmer (Austria) Dieter Quester (United States) Ron Grable (United States) Rick Knoop (Netherlands) Boy Hayje	68	1–2; 1; 1; 1; 2	DAY; 11	MIA; 5															

=== Complete World Sportscar Championship results ===
(key) Races in bold indicates pole position. Races in italics indicates fastest lap.

Complete World Sportscar Championship results
Year	Entrant	Class	Drivers	No.	Rds.	Rounds								Pts.	Pos.
Year	Entrant	Class	Drivers	No.	Rds.	1	2	3	4	5	6	7	8	Pts.	Pos.
1984	(United States) BF Goodrich	C2	(United States) Jim Busby (United States) Rick Knoop (Netherlands) Boy Hayje (United States) Pete Halsmer	67	1, 3–4, 9; 1, 3; 3; 4, 9	MON; 1		LM; 3	NÜR; 2			FUJ; 4		67	2nd
1984	(United States) BF Goodrich	C2	(Austria) Dieter Quester (Netherlands) Boy Hayje (United States) John Morton (United States) John O'Steen (Japan) Yoshimi Katayama (United States) Rick Knoop	68	1, 4, 9; 1; 3; 3; 3; 4, 9	MON; NC		LM; 1	NÜR; DNF			FUJ; 3		67	2nd

== Bibliography ==
- Martin, Jim A.; Fuller, Michael J. (2008). Michels, James Manning (ed.). Inside IMSA's Legendary GTP Race Cars. Minneapolis: MBI Publishing. ISBN 978-0-7603-3069-2. OCLC 180204868.
