= 1984 24 Hours of Daytona =

Previous: 1983	Next: 1985
Index: Races | Winners

The 22nd Annual SunBank 24 at Daytona Camel GT was a 24-hour endurance sports car race held on February 4–5, 1984 at the Daytona International Speedway road course. The race served as the opening round of the 1984 IMSA GT Championship.

Victory overall and in the GTP class went to the No. 00 Kreepy Krauly Racing March 83G driven by Sarel van der Merwe, Graham Duxbury, and Tony Martin. Victory in the GTO class went to the No. 4 Statagraph/Piedmont Chevrolet Camaro driven by Billy Hagan, Terry Labonte, and Gene Felton. Victory in the GTU class went to the No. 76 Malibu Grand Prix Mazda RX-7 driven by Ira Young, Bob Reed, Jack Baldwin, and Jim Cook.

== Race results ==
Class winners in bold.

Pos	Class	No	Team	Drivers	Car	Laps
1	**GTP**	**00**	(South Africa) **Kreepy Krauly Racing**	(South Africa) **Sarel van der Merwe** (South Africa) **Graham Duxbury** (South Africa) **Tony Martin**	**March 83G**	**640**
2	GTP	6	(United States) Henn's Swap Shop Racing	(United States) A. J. Foyt (France) Bob Wollek (United Kingdom) Derek Bell	Porsche 935	631
3	GTP	44	(United States) Group 44	(United States) Doc Bundy (United Kingdom) David Hobbs (United States) Bob Tullius	Jaguar XJR-5	612
4	GTP	86	(United States) Bayside Disposal Racing	(United States) Al Holbert (France) Claude Ballot-Léna (United States) Hurley Haywood (United States) Bruce Leven	Porsche 935	604
5	GTP	9	(United States) La Jolla Trading Group	(United States) Wayne Baker (United States) Jim Mullen (United States) Tom Blackaller	Porsche 935	602
6	**GTO**	**4**	(United States) **Statagraph/Piedmont**	(United States) **Billy Hagan** (United States) **Terry Labonte** (United States) **Gene Felton**	**Chevrolet Camaro**	**588**
7	GTP	29	(United Kingdom) CAM Motorsports	(United Kingdom) John Cooper (United Kingdom) Bob Evans (United Kingdom) Paul Smith	Nimrod NRA/C2	587
8	GTP	2	(United States) Leon Bros. Racing	(United States) Al Leon (United States) Art Leon (United States) Terry Wolters	March 84G	580
9	GTP	63	(United States) RGP 500 Racing	(United States) Jim Downing (United States) John Maffucci (United States) Whitney Ganz	Argo JM16	579
10	GTO	09	(United States) Van Every Racing	(United States) Ash Tisdelle (United States) Lance van Every	Porsche 911 Carrera RSR	579
11	GTP	45	(United States) Conte Racing	(United States) John Morton (United States) Bob Lobenberg (United States) Tony Garcia	Lola T600	578
12	**GTU**	**76**	(United States) **Malibu Grand Prix**	(United States) **Ira Young** (United States) **Bob Reed** (United States) **Jack Baldwin** (United States) **Jim Cook**	**Mazda RX-7**	**574**
13	GTU	7	(United States) E. J. Pruitt & Sons	(United States) Blake Pridgen (United States) Rusty Bond (United States) Ren Tilton	Porsche 911	571
14	GTO	38	(United States) Mandeville Auto/Tech	(United States) Roger Mandeville (United States) Amos Johnson (United States) Danny Smith	Mazda RX-7	569
15	GTO	92	(Germany) Brumos Racing	(United Kingdom) Richard Attwood (United Kingdom) Vic Elford (United States) Howard Meister (United States) Bob Hagestad	Porsche 928	569
16	GTP	28	(United Kingdom) Ray Mallock Racing	(United Kingdom) Ray Mallock (United States) Drake Olson (United Kingdom) John Sheldon	Nimrod NRA/C2	562
17	GTP	68	(United States) BFGoodrich	(United States) Pete Halsmer (Austria) Dieter Quester (United States) Ron Grable (United States) Rick Knoop	Lola T616	562
18	GTU	66	(United States) Mike Meyer Racing	(United States) Jack Dunham (United States) Paul Lewis (United States) Jeff Kline	Mazda RX-7	553
19	GTP	24	(United States) Pegasus Racing	(United States) Bobby Hefner (United States) Jack Griffin (United States) Hugo Gralia	Porsche 935	547
20	GTU	82	(United States) Firestone	(United States) Lee Mueller (United States) John Casey (United States) Terry Visger	Mazda RX-7	542
21	GTU	87	(United States) Performance Motorsports	(United States) Elliott Forbes-Robinson (United States) John Schneider (United States) Ken Williams	Porsche 924 Carrera GTR	529
22	GTP	18	(El Salvador) Fomfor Racing	(El Salvador) "Fomfor" (United States) Albert Naon (Colombia) Diego Montoya	Sauber C7	509
23	GTU	55	(Canada) Preston & Son Enterprises	(Canada) Richard Stevens (United States) Mark Brainard (United States) Don Herman	Mazda RX-7	494
24	GTP	04	(United States) Group 44	(Canada) Bill Adam (United States) Pat Bedard (United Kingdom) Brian Redman	Jaguar XJR-5	481
25	GTO	43	(United States) Walker-Brown Racing	(United Kingdom) Paul Davey (Colombia) Diego Montoya (United States) Brian Goellnicht	BMW M1	477
26	GTP	05	(United States) Hi-Tech Racing	(Cuba) Miguel Morejon (United States) Fernando Garcia (United States) Tico Almeida	Porsche 935	470
27	GTO	35	(United States) Team Dallas	(United States) Margie Smith-Haas (United States) Paul Gilgan (United States) John Zouzelka	Porsche 911 Carrera RSR	463
28	GTU	37	(United States) Vero Racing Ent.	(United States) Tom Burdsall (United States) Nort Northam (United States) Peter Welter	Mazda RX-7	433
29	GTP	03	(United States) Mason Racing	(United States) Herb Adams (United States) Kim Mason (United States) Jerry Thompson	Chevrolet Monza	432
30	GTU	32	(United States) Lee Industries/Alderman Datsun	(United States) Lew Price (United States) George Alderman (United States) Carson Baird	Datsun 280ZX	409
31 DNF	GTP	67	(United States) BFGoodrich	(United States) Jim Busby (United States) Rick Knoop (Netherlands) Boy Hayje	Lola T616	391
32	GTO	40	(Canada) Bieri Racing	(Canada) Uli Bieri (Switzerland) Angelo Pallavicini (Canada) Matt Gysler	BMW M1	384
33	GTO	01	(United States) THR Foreign Car	(United States) George Hulse (United States) Pat Lott (United States) Jerry Kennedy (United States) Michael DeFontes	Porsche 911 Carrera RSR	356
34 DNF	GTO	61	(United States) Deco Sales Associates	(United States) Brent O'Neill (United States) Don Courtney (United States) Luis Sereix	Chevrolet Monza	336
35 DNF	GTO	02	(United States) OMR Engines	(United States) William Gelles (United States) Mike Brummer (United States) Steve Cohen	Chevrolet Camaro	330
36 DNF	GTU	17	(United States) Al Bacon Racing	(United States) Al Bacon (United States) Dennis Krueger (United States) Charles Guest	Mazda RX-7	326
37 DNF	GTU	27	(United States) Scuderia Rosso	(United States) Jim Fowells (United States) Steve Potter (United States) Ray Mummery	Mazda RX-7	324
38	GTO	77	(United States) Southern Racing Promins	(United States) Gary Baker (United States) Sterling Marlin	Chevrolet Corvette	316
39 DNF	GTU	99	(United States) All American Racers	(United States) Chris Cord (United States) Jim Adams	Toyota Celica	292
40 DNF	GTO	22	(United States) Oftedahl Racing	(Canada) George Schwarz (Canada) Craig Allen (Canada) Richard Spenard	Pontiac Firebird	290
41 DNF	GTO	46	(United States) Tycos Racing	(United States) Paul Fassler (United States) Frank Jellinek (United States) Jerry Molnar	Pontiac Firebird	271
42 DNF	GTO	26	(United States) Zabatt	(United States) Tom Nehl (United States) Jerry Hansen (United States) Nelson Silcox	Chevrolet Corvette	270
43 DNF	GTU	90	(United States) 901 Shop	(United States) Mike Schaefer (United States) Jeff Andretti (United States) Nick Nicholson (United States) Jack Refenning	Porsche 911 SC	258
44 DNF	GTO	53	(United States) Daytona Racing	(United States) Robert Overby (United States) Don Bell (United States) Charles Pelz	Pontiac Firebird	245
45 DNF	GTO	75	(United States) Bob Gregg Racing	(United States) Bob Young (United States) Joe Varde (United States) Bob Gregg	Chevrolet Camaro	245
46 DNF	GTO	41	(United States) Starved Rock Ledge	(United States) Rusty Schmidt (United States) Scott Schmidt (United States) Max Schmidt	Chevrolet Corvette	245
47 DNF	GTP	97	(United States) Tide & Mosler Racing	(United States) Steve Shelton (United States) Tom Shelton	Ferrari 512 BB	242
48 DNF	GTU	79	(United States) Whitehall/Promotions	(United States) Bob Bergstrom (United Kingdom) Innes Ireland (United States) Tom Winters	Porsche 924 Carrera GTR	236
49 DNF	GTP	19	(United States) Performance Motorcar	(United States) Jack Miller (United States) Carlos Ramirez (United States) Vicki Smith	Nimrod NRA/C2	235
50 DNF	GTP	11	(United States) Dillon Enterprises	(United States) Joe Ruttman (United States) Mike Laws (United States) Don Schoenfeld (United States) Tich Richmond	Chevrolet Camaro	227
51 DNF	GTO	8	(United States) Rennsport Enterprise	(United States) Jack Lewis (United States) Bob Beasley (United States) John Ashford	Porsche 911 Carrera RSR	220
52 DNF	GTU	51	(United States) Chris Wilder	(United States) Chris Wilder (United States) Dennis DeFranceschi (United States) Buz McCall	Porsche 911	212
53 DNF	GTO	54	(United States) Bob Copeman	(United States) Bruce Redding (United States) H. J. Long (United States) Bob Copeman (United States) Jerry Jolly	Porsche 911 Carrera RSR	197
54 DNF	GTP	70	(United States) Z&W Motorsports	(United States) David Weitzenhof (United States) David Loring (United States) Pierre Honegger	Mazda GTP	187
55 DNF	GTP	3	(United States) Pegasus Racing	(United States) Ken Madren (United States) Wayne Pickering (United States) M. L. Speer	March 84G	186
56 DNF	GTP	5	(United States) Bob Akin Motor Racing	(United States) Bob Akin (United States) John O'Steen (United States) Bobby Rahal	Porsche 935	181
57 DNF	GTO	85	(United States) Latino Racing	(Costa Rica) Kikos Fonseca (Costa Rica) Carlos Fallas (El Salvador) "Jamsal"	Porsche 911 Carrera RSR	179
58 DNF	GTU	10	(United States) Dave White Racing	(United States) Jerry Kendall (United States) Bill Johnson (United States) Dave White	Porsche 924 Carrera GTR	162
59 DNF	GTU	60	(United States) Team Morrison	(United States) Jim Cook (United States) Tommy Morrison (United States) Tony Swan	Mazda RX-7	162
60 DNF	GTO	39	(United States) Luger Reality	(United States) Roy Newsome (United States) Bobby Diehl (United States) Dale Kreider (United States) Luis Sereix	Chevrolet Corvette	157
61 DNF	GTO	73	(United States) Howey Farms	(United States) Clark Howey (United States) David Crabtree (United States) Tracy Wolf	Chevrolet Camaro	150
62 DNF	GTO	47	(United States) Dingman Bros. Racing	(United States) Walt Bohren (United States) Billy Dingman (United States) Roger Bighouse	Chevrolet Corvette	135
63 DNF	GTP	16	(United States) Marty Hinze Racing	(United States) Randy Lanier (United States) Marty Hinze (United States) Bill Whittington	March 83G	131
64 DNF	GTU	93	(United States) Mid-O Racing	(United States) Kelly Marsh (United States) Don Marsh (United States) Ron Pawley	Mazda RX-7	129
65 DNF	GTO	57	(Puerto Rico) Diego Febles Racing	(Puerto Rico) Diego Febles (Puerto Rico) Tato Ferrer	Porsche 911 Carrera RSR	127
66 DNF	GTP	1	(Germany) Dr. Ing. H.C.F. Porsche	(United States) Mario Andretti (United States) Michael Andretti	Porsche 962	127
67 DNF	GTO	72	(United States) Centurian Auto Transport	(United States) Tommy Riggins (United States) Les Delano (United States) Andy Petery	Chevrolet Camaro	126
68 DNF	GTO	21	(United States) Oftedahl Racing	(United States) Mike Field (United States) Jack Newsum (United States) Rob McFarlin	Pontiac Firebird	118
69 DNF	GTU	58	El Salvador Racing	(United States) Jim Trueman (United States) Deborah Gregg (United States) Alfredo Mena	Porsche 924 Carrera GTR	110
70 DNF	GTP	07	(Canada) Heimrath Racing	(Canada) Ludwig Heimrath (Canada) Ludwig Heimrath Jr.	Porsche 930	90
71 DNF	GTO	49	(United States) Comp. Fiberglass	(United States) Mitchell Bender (United States) Bard Boand (United States) Brian Utt (United States) Phil Currin	Chevrolet Corvette	66
72 DNF	GTO	20	(United States) Paul Canary Racing	(United States) Paul Canary (United States) Jim Sanborn (United States) Victor Gonzalez	Chevrolet Corvette	64
73 DNF	GTP	25T	(United States) Red Lobster Racing	(United States) Dave Cowart (United States) Kenper Miller (Colombia) Mauricio de Narváez	March 83G	60
74 DNF	GTO	94	(United States) Tangent Racing	(United States) Bill Gardner (United States) Ronnie Sanders (United States) James Durovy	Pontiac Firebird	52
75 DNF	GTO	88	(United States) Motorsport Marketing	(United States) Ken Murray (United States) R. J. Valentine (United States) Bob Barnett	Chevrolet Camaro	51
76 DNF	GTU	98	(United States) All American Racers	(United States) Wally Dallenbach Jr. (United States) Mike Chandler (United States) Dennis Aase	Toyota Celica	49
77 DNF	GTO	91	(United States) Walter Johnston	(United States) Del Russo Taylor (United States) Larry Figaro (Guatemala) Enrique Novella	Pontiac Firebird	38
78 DNF	GTO	33	(United States) K&P Racing	(United States) Karl Keck (United States) William Wessel (United States) Allan Chastain	Chevrolet Corvette	38
79 DNF	GTP	15	(United States) Kalagian Ardisana	(United States) John Kalagian (United States) John Lloyd (United States) John Mills	Lola T600	27
80 DNF	GTU	23	(United States) New Raytown Datsun	(United States) Frank Carney (United States) Dick Davenport (United States) Bob Hindson	Datsun 200SX	25
81 DNF	GTU	84	(United States) Auto-Line Motorsport	(United States) Clay Young (United States) Doug Grunnet (United States) Jim Burt	Pontiac Fiero	19
82 DNF	GTU	13	(United States) Rubino Racing	(United States) Frank Rubino (United States) Jose Rodriguez (United States) Dennis Vitolo	Mazda RX-7	17
DNQ	GTU	69	(United States) John Hofstra	(United States) John Hofstra (United States) George Shafer (United States) Peter Uria	Porsche 911	-
DNQ	GTU	81	(United States) Diamond Racing	(United States) John Saucier (United States) Ronnie Franklin (United States) Chuck Gravel	Datsun Z	-
DNQ	GTU	42	(United States) Ken Moore	(United States) Robin Boone (United States) H. J. Long (United States) Rich Bontempi	Porsche 911	-
DNQ	GTO	83	(United States) Diamond Racing	(United States) Mike Gassaway (United States) Steve Pfeifer (United States) Bob Tayar	Chevrolet Camaro	-
