= 1984 1000 km of Monza =

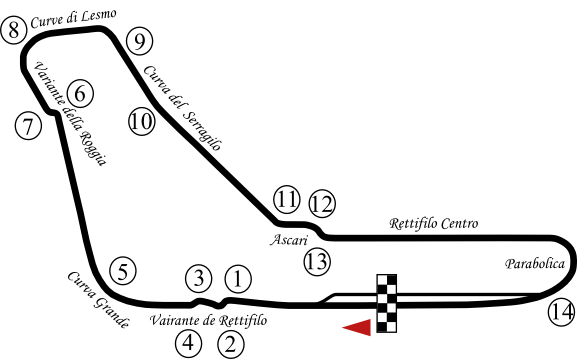
Layout of the Autodromo Nazionale di Monza (1976-1993)

The 1984 Trofeo Filippo Caracciolo was the opening round of the 1984 World Endurance Championship. It took place at the Autodromo Nazionale Monza, Italy on 23 April 1984.

== Official results ==
Class winners in bold. Cars failing to complete 75% of the winner's distance marked as Not Classified (NC).

Pos	Class	No	Team	Drivers	Chassis	Tyre	Laps
Pos	Class	No	Team	Drivers	Engine	Tyre	Laps
1	**C1**	**2**	**(Germany) Rothmans Porsche**	**(Germany) Stefan Bellof (United Kingdom) Derek Bell**	**Porsche 956**	**D**	**173**
1	**C1**	**2**	**(Germany) Rothmans Porsche**	**(Germany) Stefan Bellof (United Kingdom) Derek Bell**	**Porsche Type-935 2.6 L Turbo Flat-6**	**D**	**173**
2	C1	1	(Germany) Rothmans Porsche	(Germany) Jochen Mass (Belgium) Jacky Ickx	Porsche 956	**D**	173
2	C1	1	(Germany) Rothmans Porsche	(Germany) Jochen Mass (Belgium) Jacky Ickx	Porsche Type-935 2.6 L Turbo Flat-6	**D**	173
3	C1	5	(Italy) Martini Racing	(Italy) Mauro Baldi (Italy) Paolo Barilla	Lancia LC2	**D**	168
3	C1	5	(Italy) Martini Racing	(Italy) Mauro Baldi (Italy) Paolo Barilla	Ferrari 308C 2.6 L Turbo V8	**D**	168
4	C1	19	(Switzerland) Brun Motorsport (Germany) Kremer Racing	(Germany) Hans-Joachim Stuck (Germany) Harald Grohs (Switzerland) Walter Brun	Porsche 956	**D**	167
4	C1	19	(Switzerland) Brun Motorsport (Germany) Kremer Racing	(Germany) Hans-Joachim Stuck (Germany) Harald Grohs (Switzerland) Walter Brun	Porsche Type-935 2.6 L Turbo Flat-6	**D**	167
5	C1	14	(United Kingdom) GTi Engineering	(United Kingdom) Jonathan Palmer (Netherlands) Jan Lammers	Porsche 956	**D**	159
5	C1	14	(United Kingdom) GTi Engineering	(United Kingdom) Jonathan Palmer (Netherlands) Jan Lammers	Porsche Type-935 2.6 L Turbo Flat-6	**D**	159
6	C1	12	(Germany) Schornstein Racing Team	(Germany) Volkert Merl (Germany) Dieter Schornstein	Porsche 956	**D**	155
6	C1	12	(Germany) Schornstein Racing Team	(Germany) Volkert Merl (Germany) Dieter Schornstein	Porsche Type-935 2.6 L Turbo Flat-6	**D**	155
7	C1	46	(France) Pierre Yver	(France) Pierre Yver (Belgium) Bernard de Dryver	Rondeau M382	**D**	152
7	C1	46	(France) Pierre Yver	(France) Pierre Yver (Belgium) Bernard de Dryver	Ford Cosworth DFL 3.3 L V8	**D**	152
8	**C2**	**67**	**(United States) B.F. Goodrich**	**(United States) Jim Busby (United States) Rick Knoop**	**Lola T616**	**BF**	**145**
8	**C2**	**67**	**(United States) B.F. Goodrich**	**(United States) Jim Busby (United States) Rick Knoop**	**Mazda 13B 1.3 L 2-Rotor**	**BF**	**145**
9	**B**	**101**	**(Denmark) Jens Winther**	**(Denmark) Jens Winther (Denmark) Lars-Viggo Jensen**	**BMW M1**	**A**	**144**
9	**B**	**101**	**(Denmark) Jens Winther**	**(Denmark) Jens Winther (Denmark) Lars-Viggo Jensen**	**BMW M88/1 3.5 L I6**	**A**	**144**
10	C2	77	(United Kingdom) Ecurie Ecosse	(United Kingdom) Ray Mallock (United Kingdom) Mike Wilds (United Kingdom) David Duffield	Ecosse C284	**A**	141
10	C2	77	(United Kingdom) Ecurie Ecosse	(United Kingdom) Ray Mallock (United Kingdom) Mike Wilds (United Kingdom) David Duffield	Ford Cosworth DFV 3.0 L V8	**A**	141
11	C2	80	(Italy) Jolly Club	(Italy) Carlo Facetti (Italy) Martino Finotto	Alba AR2	**A**	140
11	C2	80	(Italy) Jolly Club	(Italy) Carlo Facetti (Italy) Martino Finotto	Giannini Carma FF 1.9 L Turbo I4	**A**	140
12	C2	72	(Germany) Gebhardt Motorsport	(Germany) Frank Jelinski (United States) Cliff Hansen	Gebhardt JC842	**A**	136
12	C2	72	(Germany) Gebhardt Motorsport	(Germany) Frank Jelinski (United States) Cliff Hansen	BMW M12/7 2.0 L I4	**A**	136
13	B	117	(Sweden) Strandell Racing	(Sweden) Kenneth Leim (Sweden) Tomas Wiren	Porsche 930	?	134
13	B	117	(Sweden) Strandell Racing	(Sweden) Kenneth Leim (Sweden) Tomas Wiren	Porsche 3.3 L Turbo Flat-6	?	134
14	B	114	(France) Michel Lateste	(France) Michel Lateste (France) Michel Bienvault	Porsche 930	?	122
14	B	114	(France) Michel Lateste	(France) Michel Lateste (France) Michel Bienvault	Porsche 3.3 L Turbo Flat-6	?	122
15 NC	C2	68	(United States) B.F. Goodrich	(Austria) Dieter Quester (Netherlands) Boy Hayje	Lola T616	**BF**	116
15 NC	C2	68	(United States) B.F. Goodrich	(Austria) Dieter Quester (Netherlands) Boy Hayje	Mazda 13B 1.3 L 2-Rotor	**BF**	116
16 NC	B	113	(Switzerland) Hobby Rallye	(Switzerland) Jean-Pierre Frey (Switzerland) Mario Regusci (Switzerland) Olindo Del-Thé	Porsche 930	?	96
16 NC	B	113	(Switzerland) Hobby Rallye	(Switzerland) Jean-Pierre Frey (Switzerland) Mario Regusci (Switzerland) Olindo Del-Thé	Porsche 3.3 L Turbo Flat-6	?	96
17 DNF	C1	4	(Italy) Martini Racing	(Italy) Riccardo Patrese (France) Bob Wollek	Lancia LC2	**D**	132
17 DNF	C1	4	(Italy) Martini Racing	(Italy) Riccardo Patrese (France) Bob Wollek	Ferrari 308C 2.6 L Turbo V8	**D**	132
18 DNF	C1	55	(United Kingdom) Skoal Bandit Porsche Team (United Kingdom) John Fitzpatrick Racing	(United Kingdom) Rupert Keegan (United Kingdom) Guy Edwards	Porsche 956	**Y**	96
18 DNF	C1	55	(United Kingdom) Skoal Bandit Porsche Team (United Kingdom) John Fitzpatrick Racing	(United Kingdom) Rupert Keegan (United Kingdom) Guy Edwards	Porsche Type-935 2.6 L Turbo Flat-6	**Y**	96
19 DNF	B	102	(Germany) Racing Team Jürgensen	(Germany) Hans Christian Jürgensen (Germany) Edgar Dören (Germany) Walter Mertes	BMW M1	?	93
19 DNF	B	102	(Germany) Racing Team Jürgensen	(Germany) Hans Christian Jürgensen (Germany) Edgar Dören (Germany) Walter Mertes	BMW M88/1 3.5 L I6	?	93
20 DNF	C1	33	(United Kingdom) Skoal Bandit Porsche Team (United Kingdom) John Fitzpatrick Racing	(United Kingdom) David Hobbs (Belgium) Thierry Boutsen	Porsche 956	**Y**	87
20 DNF	C1	33	(United Kingdom) Skoal Bandit Porsche Team (United Kingdom) John Fitzpatrick Racing	(United Kingdom) David Hobbs (Belgium) Thierry Boutsen	Porsche Type-935 2.6 L Turbo Flat-6	**Y**	87
21 DNF	C1	6	(Italy) Jolly Club	(Italy) Beppe Gabbiani (Italy) Pierluigi Martini	Lancia LC2	**D**	80
21 DNF	C1	6	(Italy) Jolly Club	(Italy) Beppe Gabbiani (Italy) Pierluigi Martini	Ferrari 308C 2.6 L Turbo V8	**D**	80
22 DNF	IMSA; GTP	132	(United Kingdom) Lyncar Motorsports Inc.	(United Kingdom) Les Blackburn (Greece) Costas Los	Lyncar MS83	**A**	78
22 DNF	IMSA; GTP	132	(United Kingdom) Lyncar Motorsports Inc.	(United Kingdom) Les Blackburn (Greece) Costas Los	Hart 420R 2.0 L I4	**A**	78
23 DNF	C1	47	(Germany) Obermaier Racing	(Germany) Axel Plankenhorn (Germany) Jürgen Lässig (South Africa) George Fouché	Porsche 956	**D**	70
23 DNF	C1	47	(Germany) Obermaier Racing	(Germany) Axel Plankenhorn (Germany) Jürgen Lässig (South Africa) George Fouché	Porsche Type-935 2.6 L Turbo Flat-6	**D**	70
24 DNF	IMSA; GTX	131	(Italy) "Victor"	(Italy) "Victor" (Italy) "Gimax" (Italy) Gianni Mussato	Porsche 935	?	60
24 DNF	IMSA; GTX	131	(Italy) "Victor"	(Italy) "Victor" (Italy) "Gimax" (Italy) Gianni Mussato	Porsche Type-930 3.2 L Turbo Flat-6	?	60
25 DNF	C2	93	(France) Jean-Philippe Grand	(France) Jean-Philippe Grand (Belgium) Jean-Paul Libert (Belgium) Pascal Witmeur	Rondeau M379C	**A**	45
25 DNF	C2	93	(France) Jean-Philippe Grand	(France) Jean-Philippe Grand (Belgium) Jean-Paul Libert (Belgium) Pascal Witmeur	Ford Cosworth DFV 3.0 L V8	**A**	45
26 DNF	C2	81	(Italy) Jolly Club	(Italy) Almo Coppelli (Italy) Davide Pavia	Alba AR2	**A**	36
26 DNF	C2	81	(Italy) Jolly Club	(Italy) Almo Coppelli (Italy) Davide Pavia	Giannini Carma FF 1.9 L Turbo I4	**A**	36
27 DNF	B	104	(Germany) Dr. van Staehr	(Germany) Wolf-Georg van Staehr (Germany) Ulli Richter	Porsche 924 Carrera GTS	**P**	32
27 DNF	B	104	(Germany) Dr. van Staehr	(Germany) Wolf-Georg van Staehr (Germany) Ulli Richter	Porsche 2.0 L Turbo I4	**P**	32
28 DNF	C1	9	(Switzerland) Brun Motorsport	(Argentina) Oscar Larrauri (Italy) Massimo Sigala	Porsche 956	**D**	19
28 DNF	C1	9	(Switzerland) Brun Motorsport	(Argentina) Oscar Larrauri (Italy) Massimo Sigala	Porsche Type-935 2.6 L Turbo Flat-6	**D**	19
29 DNF	B	115	(France) Raymond Touroul	(France) Raymond Touroul (France) Valentin Bertapelle	Porsche 930	**MI**	18
29 DNF	B	115	(France) Raymond Touroul	(France) Raymond Touroul (France) Valentin Bertapelle	Porsche 3.3 L Turbo Flat-6	**MI**	18
30 DNF	C1	7	(Germany) Joest Racing	(Germany) Klaus Ludwig (France) Henri Pescarolo (Sweden) Stefan Johansson	Porsche 956	**D**	17
30 DNF	C1	7	(Germany) Joest Racing	(Germany) Klaus Ludwig (France) Henri Pescarolo (Sweden) Stefan Johansson	Porsche Type-935 2.6 L Turbo Flat-6	**D**	17
31 DNF	C1	34	(United Kingdom) John Fitzpatrick Racing	(Italy) Renzo Zorzi (Italy) Giorgio Francia	Porsche 956	**Y**	14
31 DNF	C1	34	(United Kingdom) John Fitzpatrick Racing	(Italy) Renzo Zorzi (Italy) Giorgio Francia	Porsche Type-935 2.6 L Turbo Flat-6	**Y**	14
32 DNF	B	111	(United Kingdom) Charles Ivey Racing	(United States) Paul Haas (United States) Margie Smith-Haas	Porsche 930	**A**	11
32 DNF	B	111	(United Kingdom) Charles Ivey Racing	(United States) Paul Haas (United States) Margie Smith-Haas	Porsche 3.3 L Turbo Flat-6	**A**	11
DNS	C1	13	(France) Primagaz Team Cougar	(France) Yves Courage (United Kingdom) Alain de Cadenet (Italy) Gianni Giudici	Cougar C01B	**MI**	-
DNS	C1	13	(France) Primagaz Team Cougar	(France) Yves Courage (United Kingdom) Alain de Cadenet (Italy) Gianni Giudici	Ford Cosworth DFL 3.3 L V8	**MI**	-
DNS	C1	21	(United Kingdom) Charles Ivey Racing	(United Kingdom) John Cooper (United Kingdom) Dudley Wood	Grid S2	**A**	-
DNS	C1	21	(United Kingdom) Charles Ivey Racing	(United Kingdom) John Cooper (United Kingdom) Dudley Wood	Porsche Type-930 3.0 L Turbo Flat-6	**A**	-
DNS	C1	35	(Germany) Procar Automobil AG	(Germany) Clemens Schikentanz (Netherlands) Huub Rothengatter	Sehcar C830	**D**	-
DNS	C1	35	(Germany) Procar Automobil AG	(Germany) Clemens Schikentanz (Netherlands) Huub Rothengatter	Porsche Type-935 2.6 L Turbo Flat-6	**D**	-
DNS	B	116	(Germany) Georg Memminger	(Germany) Georg Memminger (Germany) Heinz Kuhn-Weiss (Italy) Bruno Rebai	Porsche 930	?	-
DNS	B	116	(Germany) Georg Memminger	(Germany) Georg Memminger (Germany) Heinz Kuhn-Weiss (Italy) Bruno Rebai	Porsche 3.3 L Turbo Flat-6	?	-

== Statistics ==
- Pole Position - #2 Rothmans Porsche - 1:35.85
- Fastest Lap - #4 Martini Racing - 1:38.00
- Average Speed - 196.576 km/h (122.147 mph)

World Sportscar Championship
Previous race: None	1984 season	Next race: 1984 1000 km of Silverstone
