= Boy Hayje =

Dutch racing driver (born 1949)

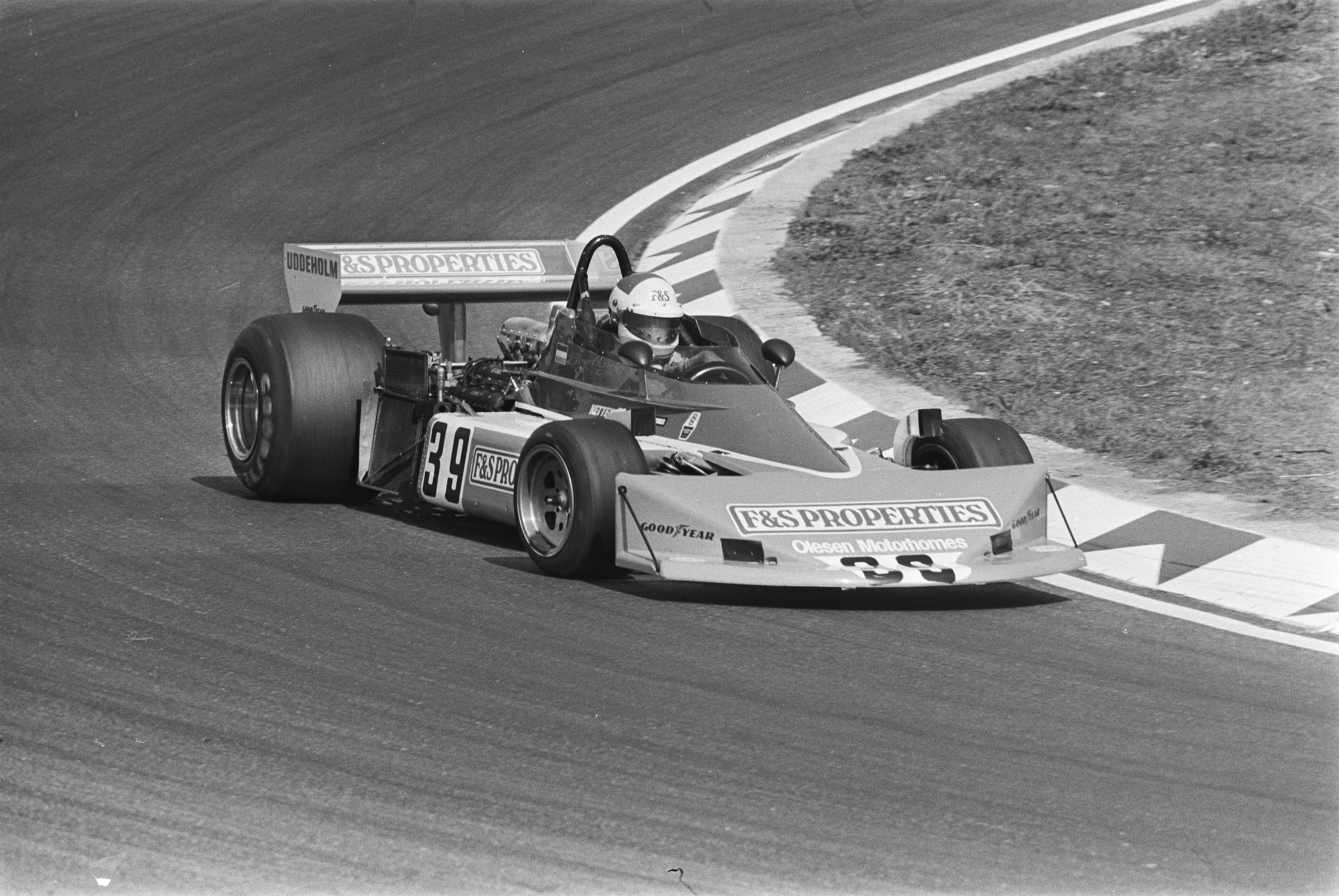
- Hayje driving a PC3 entered by F&S Properties for the 1976 Dutch Grand Prix
- Born: Johan Gerard Hayje; 3 May 1949 (age 77); Amsterdam, Netherlands

Formula One World Championship career
- Nationality: (Netherlands) Dutch
- Active years: 1976–1977
- Team(s): Non-works Penske, RAM
- Entries: 7 (3 starts)
- Championships: 0
- Wins: 0
- Podiums: 0
- Career points: 0
- Pole positions: 0
- Fastest laps: 0
- First entry: 1976 Dutch Grand Prix
- Last entry: 1977 Dutch Grand Prix

Johan Gerard "Boy" Hayje (born 3 May 1949) is a former racing driver from the Netherlands. He participated in seven Formula One Grands Prix, debuting on 29 August 1976. He scored no championship points.

After time spent racing saloon cars, and winning the Dutch Formula Ford Championshipin 1974 and 1979, Hayje raced in Formula 5000 and Formula 3. He drove a privately entered Penske in his home Grand Prix in 1976, before a difficult period in Formula One the following year, where he drove a March for RAM Racing.

Once his Formula One career was over, Hayje raced in the European Renault 5 Turbo Championship.

== Racing record ==
=== Complete European F5000/British Formula One Championship results ===
(key)

Year	Entrant	Chassis	Engine	1	2	3	4	5	6	7	8	9	10	11	12	13	14	15	16	17	18	Pos.	Pts
1974	Motor Circuit Developments	McLaren M18	Chevrolet 5.0 V8	BRH	MAL	SIL	OUL	BRH	ZOL	THR	ZAN; 12	MUG	MNZ	MAL	MON	THR	BRH	OUL	SNE	MAL	BRH	NC	0
1975	Hezemans Racing	March 731	Ford GAA 3.4 V6	BRH	OUL	BRH	SIL	ZOL; Ret	ZAN; 5	THR; DNS	SNE; DNS	MAL	THR	BRH	OUL	SIL; 14	SNE; Ret	MAL	BRH; Ret			27th	8
1977	F & S Racing	March 761	Ford Cosworth DFV 3.0 V8	MAL	SNE	OUL	BRH	MAL	THR	BRH	OUL	MAL	DON	BRH	THR	SNE	BRH; DNS					NC	0
1978	Fred Opert Racing	Chevron B42	Hart	OUL	BRH	SNE	MAL	ZAN; 3	DON	THR	OUL	MAL	BRH	THR	SNE							16th	12

=== Complete Formula One results ===
(key)

Year	Entrant	Chassis	Engine	1	2	3	4	5	6	7	8	9	10	11	12	13	14	15	16	17	WDC	Pts
1976	F&S Properties	Penske PC3	Ford Cosworth DFV 3.0 V8	BRA	RSA	USW	ESP	BEL	MON	SWE	FRA	GBR	GER	AUT	NED; Ret	ITA	CAN	USA	JPN		NC	0
1977	F&S Properties Racing	March 761	Ford Cosworth DFV 3.0 V8	ARG	BRA	RSA; Ret	USW	ESP; DNQ	MON; DNQ	BEL; NC	SWE; DNQ	FRA	GBR	GER	AUT	NED; DNQ	ITA	USA	CAN	JPN	NC	0

=== Complete World Sportscar Championship results ===
(key)

Year	Entrant	Class	Chassis	Engine	1	2	3	4	5	6	7	8	9	10	11	Pos.	Pts
1977	Lester Ray	S 2.0	Vogue SP2	Ford Cosworth BDG 2.0 L4	DIJ; Ret	MNZ	VAL	PER	EST	LEC	IMO	SAL				(Note: In 1976 and 1977 the World Championship was divided into two series that ran simultaneously but separately: The World Sportscar Championship and the World Championship for Makes.)	
1984	B.F. Goodrich	C2	Lola T616	Mazda 13B 1.3 2-Rotor	MNZ; NC	SIL	LMS; 12	NÜR	BRH	MOS						NC	0
1984	Procar Automobil	C1	Sehcar C830	Porsche Type-935 2.6 F6t							SPA; DNS	IMO	FUJ	KYA	SAN	NC	0

Footnotes

=== Complete European Formula Two Championship results ===
(key)

Year	Entrant	Chassis	Engine	1	2	3	4	5	6	7	8	9	10	11	12	Pos.	Pts
1978	Fred Opert Racing	Chevron B42	Hart	THR; 11	HOC; 16	NÜR; 14	PAU	MUG; 23	VLL; DNQ	ROU; 7	DON; Ret	NOG	PER	MIS; DNQ	HOC; 7	NC	0
1979	Brian Henton	March 782	Hart	SIL	HOC	THR	NÜR	VLL	MUG	PAU	HOC	ZAN; Ret	PER	MIS	DON	NC	0

=== Complete 24 Hours of Le Mans results ===
Year	Team	Co-drivers	Car	Class	Laps	Pos.	Class Pos.
1984	(United States) B.F. Goodrich Company	(United States) Jim Busby (United States) Rick Knoop	Lola T616-Mazda	C2	295	12th	3rd
