= 24 Hours of Daytona =

Sports car endurance race held in Daytona, Florida

IMSA WeatherTech SportsCar Championship
- Venue: Daytona International Speedway
- Corporate sponsor: Rolex
- First race: 1962
- Last race: 2026
- Duration: 24 hours
- Previous names: Daytona 3 Hour Continental (1962–1963); Daytona 2000 (1964–1965); 24 Hours of Daytona (1966–1971, 1973, 1975–1977); 6 Hours of Daytona (1972); 24 Hour Pepsi Challenge (1978–1983); SunBank 24 at Daytona (1984–1991); Rolex 24 At Daytona (1992–Present)
- Most wins (driver): Hurley Haywood (5); Scott Pruett (5)
- Most wins (team): Chip Ganassi Racing (6)
- Most wins (manufacturer): Porsche (21)

The 24 Hours of Daytona, also known as the Rolex 24 at Daytona for sponsorship reasons, is a 24-hour sports car endurance race held annually at Daytona International Speedway in Daytona Beach, Florida. It is run on the Sports Car Course layout, a 3.56-mile (5.73 km) combined road course that uses most of the tri-oval plus an infield road course. The race has about 60 different cars competing for victory across multiple classes. With multiple drivers “Each team trades shifts between three and five drivers”. The race is held on the last weekend of January or first weekend of February as part of Speedweeks, making it the first major automobile race of the year in North America. The race is sanctioned by IMSA and is the first race of the season for the IMSA SportsCar Championship.

The race has borne the names of several sponsors over the years. Since 1992, Rolex has been the title sponsor of the race, replacing Sunbank, which replaced Pepsi in 1984. Winning drivers of all classes receive a Rolex Daytona watch, a tradition that started back in 1964 for the Daytona Continental. The reason behind racers winning a watch is because back then “chronographs were really “tool watches” for those in the racing industry” used for time purposes.

The race is known as a leg of the informal Triple Crown of endurance racing along with the 24 Hours of Le Mans and 12 Hours of Sebring.

== Beginnings ==
Shortly after the track opened, on April 5, 1959, a six-hour/1000 kilometer USAC-FIA sports car race was held on the road course. Count Antonio Von Dory and Roberto Mieres won the race in a Porsche, shortened to 560.07 miles (901.35 km) due to darkness. The race used a 3.81-mile layout, running clockwise. This event is not considered to be part of the lineage of the eventual 24-hour race.

In 1962, a 3-hour sports car race was introduced. First known as the Daytona Continental, it counted towards the FIA's new International Championship for GT Manufacturers. The first Continental was won by Dan Gurney, driving a 2.7L Coventry Climax-powered Lotus 19. Gurney was a factory Porsche driver at the time, but the 1600-cc Porsche 718 was considered too small and slow for what amounted to a sprint race on a very fast course. In the past, a car had to cross the finish line after 24 hours to be classified, which led to dramatic scenes where damaged cars waited in the pits or on the edge of the track close to the finish line for hours, then restarted their engines and crawled across the finish line one last time in order to finish after the 24 hours and be listed with a finishing distance, rather than dismissed with DNF (did not finish). This was the case in the initial 1962 Daytona Continental (then 3 hours), in which Dan Gurney's Lotus 19 had established a lengthy lead when the engine failed with just minutes remaining. Gurney stopped the car at the top of the banking, just short of the finish line. When the three hours had elapsed, Gurney simply cranked the steering wheel to the left (toward the bottom of the banking) and let gravity pull the car across the line, to not only salvage a finishing position, but actually win the race. This led to the international rule requiring a car to cross the line under its own power in order to be classified.

In 1964, the event was expanded to 2,000 km (1,240 mi), doubling the classic 1000 km distance of races at Nürburgring, Spa and Monza. The distance amounted to roughly half of the distance the 24 Hours of Le Mans winners covered at the time, and was similar in length to the 12 Hours of Sebring, which was also held in Florida in March. Starting in 1966, the Daytona race was extended to the same 24-hour length as Le Mans.

== 24-hour history ==
The first 24 Hour event in 1966 was won by Ken Miles and Lloyd Ruby driving a Ford Mk. II. Motor Sport reported: "For their first 24-hour race the basic organization was good, but the various officials in many cases were out of touch, childish and lacked the professional touch which one now finds at Watkins Glen."

1966 also saw Suzy Dietrich enter the 24 Hours event, driving a Sunbeam Alpine with Janet Guthrie and Donna Mae Mims. The trio finished 32nd and, along with another women's team in the race, became the first women's teams to finish an international-standard 24-hour race.

After having lost in 1966 at Daytona, Sebring and Le Mans to the Fords, the Ferrari P series prototypes staged a 1–2–3 side-by-side parade finish at the banked finish line in 1967. The Ferrari 365 GTB/4 road car was given the unofficial name Ferrari Daytona in celebration of this victory.

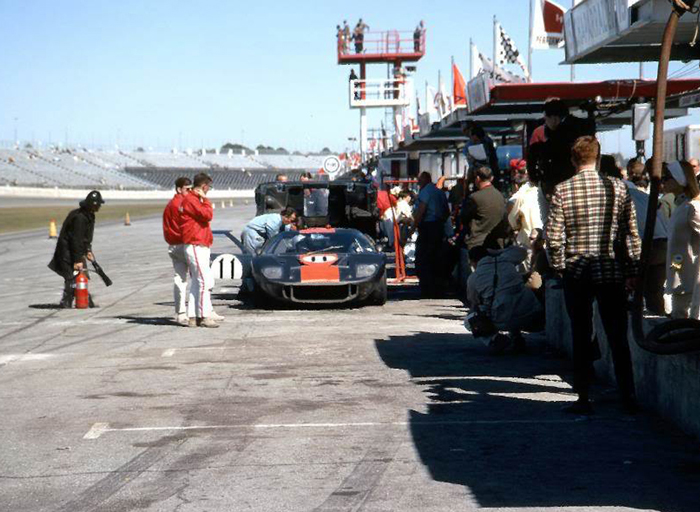
Pit box of the Ford team during the 1967 24 Hours of Daytona

Porsche repeated this show in their 1–2–3 win in the 1968 24 Hours. After the car of Gerhard Mitter had a big crash caused by tire failure in the banking, his teammate Rolf Stommelen supported the car of Vic Elford and Jochen Neerpasch. When the car of the longtime leaders Jo Siffert and Hans Herrmann dropped to second due to a technical problem, these two also joined the new leaders while continuing with their car. So Porsche managed to put 5 of 8 drivers on the center of the podium, plus Jo Schlesser and Joe Buzzetta finishing in third place, with only Mitter being left out.

Lola finished 1–2 in the 1969 24 Hours of Daytona. The winning car was the Penske Lola T70-Chevrolet of Mark Donohue and Chuck Parsons. Few spectators witnessed the achievement as Motor Sport reported: "The Daytona 24-Hour race draws a very small crowd, as can be seen from the empty stands in the background."

1970 saw the race with drivers strapped into their cars, and at the start, drove away. Since 1971, races begin with rolling starts. In 1972, the rules changed, limiting cars to only 3.0 liters instead of the previous 5.0 liters and made a weight limit for cars as well. This caused Porsche to back out of the series for that year leading to a Ferrari victory.

In 1972, because of an FIA rule, the race was shortened to six hours, while the energy crisis led to the cancellation altogether in 1974. The Sports Car Club of America sanctioning was replaced by the International Motor Sports Association in 1975.

In 1982 the race continued on as part of the IMSA GT Championship instead of WSC.

In 1989, the race was delayed due to fog for four hours. This was the longest time the race was paused due to fog. The race has been paused due to fog multiple times. In this time the cars are forced to follow a pace car. In 2011, the race was delayed so long due to the fog that the pace car was forced to stop for gas.

In 2014, the race saw a dramatic crash involving Memo Gidley who was driving the pole-sitter DP and Matteo Malucelli, an amateur driver in a Ferrari 458 of the GTD category that has never won a race in North American Endurance. At the time of the impact, Malucelli was driving at less than 30 mph and keeping on the track while cars were passing him at 150 mph. Memo, who was side by side to another car couldn't have seen him and impacted front first. The race was subsequently red-flagged. Both drivers survived.

The regular teams were expanded to three drivers in the 1970s. Nowadays, teams typically use four drivers due to the longer night stints. All four drivers in the GTP and GTD Pro classes are usually professionals. In the LMP2 and GTD classes, most teams field at least one "amateur driver" (also known as "gentleman drivers") who has built a career in a non-motorsport related occupation; these types of drivers are typically eligible for IMSA's Jim Trueman and Bob Akin awards, awarded to the top driver who is not a professional at the end of season. These amateur drivers or overage professional drivers (the FIA Silver or Bronze ratings are typically for amateur drivers but professional drivers over 55 are automatically classified at these levels) are required to drive the car for a specific number of hours. Most often, the fourth driver on a team is a Daytona-only professional driver of renown that most often has won a major professional championship, such as Scott Dixon, Jeff Gordon, Fernando Alonso, Shane van Gisbergen and Kyle Busch.

Unlike the Le Mans event, the Daytona race is conducted entirely over a closed course within the speedway arena without the use of any public roads. The circuit shares the start/finish line and pit lane with the Daytona super-speedway oval before turning into the infield section, a fast, sweeping layout with two hairpins (the International Horseshoes). The course rejoins the oval on the long back-straight, broken up by the Le Mans or Bus Stop chicane, before taking the high banked Turns 3 and 4 and finishing through the tri-oval. While Le Mans is held in June and at a higher latitude, Daytona is held in wintertime and closer to the equator, giving drivers and teams a unique test as more of the race is held at night. There are lights installed around the circuit for night racing, although the infield section is still not as well-lit as the main oval. However, the main speedway lights are turned on only to a level of 20%, similar to the stadium lighting setup at Le Mans, with brighter lights for safety purposes around the pits and decent lighting similar to street lights around the infield.

== GTP ==
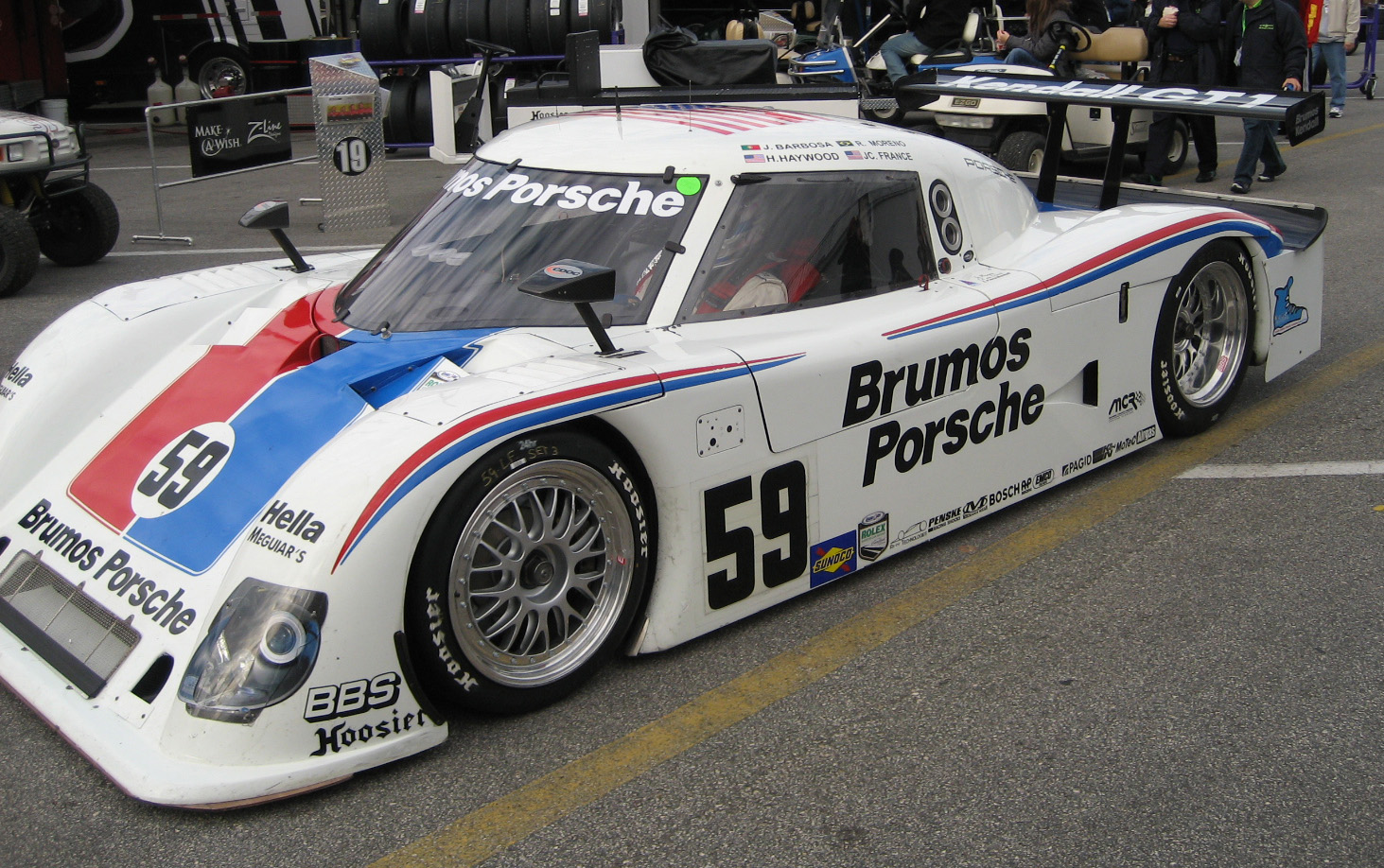
Daytona Prototype

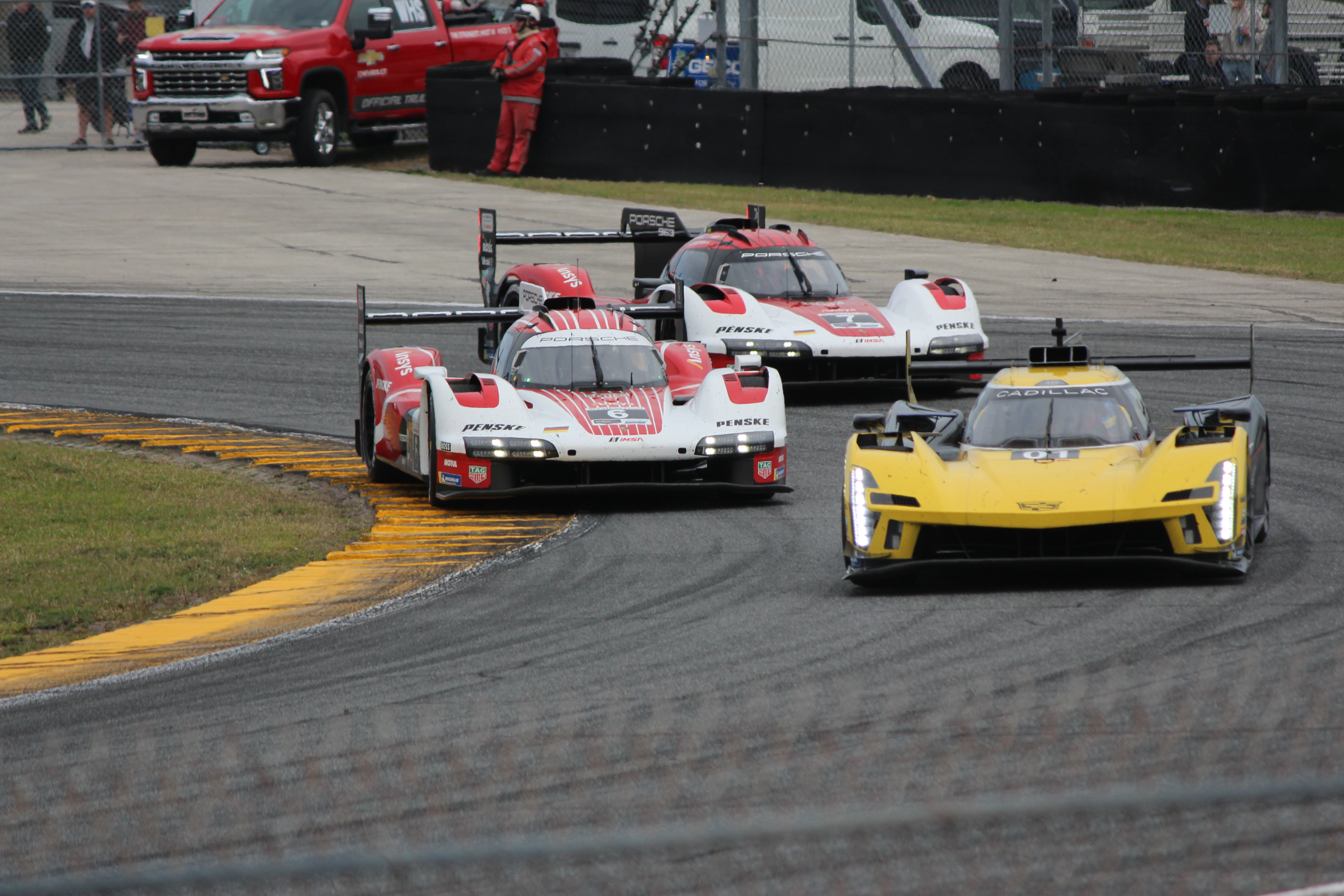
GTP cars during the 2023 running of the event

After several ownership changes at IMSA which changed the direction the organization followed, it was decided by the 1990s that the Daytona event would align with the Grand-Am series, a competitor of the American Le Mans Series, which, as its name implies, uses the same regulations as the Le Mans Series and the 24 Hours of Le Mans. The Grand Am series, though, is instead closely linked to NASCAR and the original ideas of IMSA and focused on controlled costs and close competition.

In order to make sports car racing less expensive than elsewhere, new rules were introduced in 2002. The dedicated Daytona Prototypes (DP) used less expensive materials and technologies and the car's simple aerodynamics reduce the development and testing costs. The DPs began racing in 2003 with six cars in the race.

Specialist chassis makers like Riley, Dallara, and Lola provided the DP cars for the teams and the engines are branded under the names of major car companies like Cadillac, Lexus, Ford, BMW, and Porsche.

After Grand-Am and ALMS merged in 2014 under the IMSA banner, it was determined that a new prototype class was needed to merge the former series' top classes (DP for Grand-Am, LMP2 for ALMS). 2017 saw the introduction of the DPi (Daytona Prototype International) class. These cars were based on LMP2 chassis with a custom engine and bodywork from a major manufacturer.

For 2023, the race adopted the LMDh prototype specification; Le Mans Hypercars are also permitted as IMSA and the ACO harmonized their prototype regulations so additional teams and cars could race at both IMSA and WEC events. The series has also returned to the Grand Touring Prototype name from the 1980s.

In 2023, the first hybrid car, an Acura ARX-06, won the Rolex 24 Hours at Daytona. IMSA has set regulations on energy usage for hybrids with penalties if teams using these engines break these rules. The new hybrid engines can help increase horsepower due to the electric battery and gas engine working together which can be an advantage in certain parts of the race. By 2026, the majority of the GTP field had adopted a hybrid powertrain; only the Aston Martin Valkyrie AMR-LMH solely used a combustion engine.

== GT Daytona ==
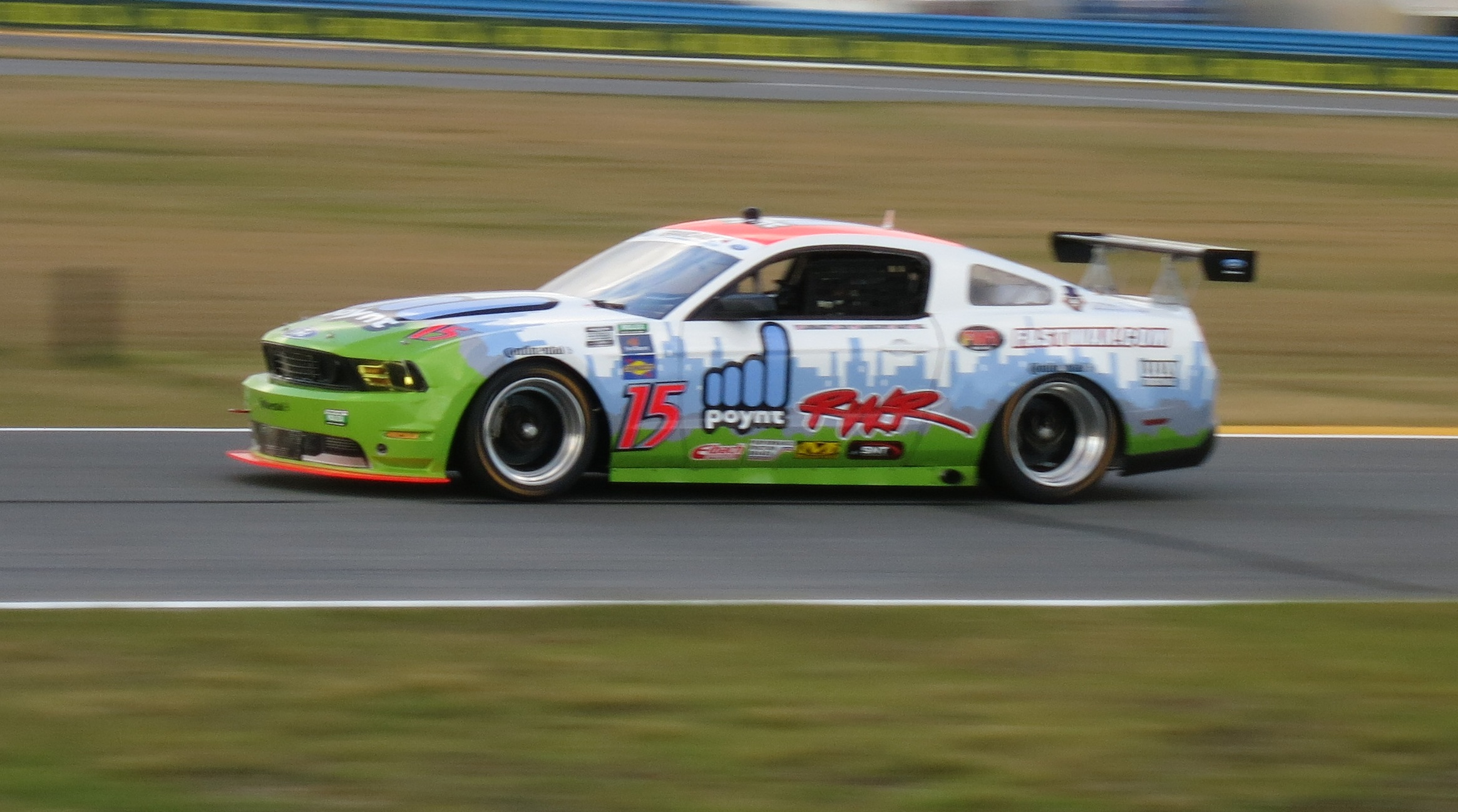
Ford Mustang GT car during the 2012 Daytona 24 hours

The Gran Turismo class cars at Daytona are closer to the road versions, similar to the GT3 class elsewhere. For example, the more standard Cup version of the Porsche 996 is used, instead of the usual RS/RSR racing versions. Recent Daytona entries also include BMW M3s and M6s, Porsche 911s, Chevy Camaros and Corvettes, Mazda RX-8s, Pontiac GTO.Rs, and Ferrari F430 Challenges. The Audi R8 and the Ferrari 458 Italia debuted in the 50th anniversary of the race in 2012.

From the era of the IMSA GTO and GTU until the 2015 rule changes, spaceframe cars clad in lookalike body panels to compete in GT (the new BMW M6, Chevrolet Camaro, and Mazda RX-8). These rules are similar to the old GTO specification, but with more restrictions. The intent of spaceframe cars is to allow teams to save money, especially after crashes, where teams can rebuild the cars for the next race at a much lower cost, or even redevelop cars, instead of having to write off an entire car after a crash or at the end of a year.

Starting in 2014 the GT Daytona class was restricted exclusively to Group GT3 cars. Alongside this came the GTLM class, using LM GTE cars, similar to the contemporary class in WEC. GTLM was seen as the more "elite" class, with factory teams and professional drivers, while GTD fields had a larger proportion of privateers and gentleman drivers.

IMSA, alongside WEC, moved the entire GT class to the Group GT3 standard in the 2022 season due to declining manufacturer interest in the GTE specification. This change split the GT Daytona class into GTD and GTD PRO. Both GTD classes use GT3 homologated cars with identical balance of performance regulations; the only difference is that GTD requires at least one amateur driver (with an FIA silver or bronze rating) per team while driver selection is open in GTD PRO.

== Statistics ==
=== Multiple wins by driver ===
Rank	Driver	Wins	Years
1	(United States) Hurley Haywood	5	1973, 1975, 1977, 1979, 1991
1	(United States) Scott Pruett	5	1994, 2007, 2008, 2011, 2013
3	(Mexico) Pedro Rodríguez	4	1963, 1964, 1970, 1971
3	(France) Bob Wollek	4	1983, 1985, 1989, 1991
3	(United States) Peter Gregg	4	1973, 1975, 1976, 1978
3	(West Germany) Rolf Stommelen	4	1968, 1978, 1980, 1982
7	(United Kingdom) Brian Redman	3	1970, 1976, 1981
7	(United Kingdom) Andy Wallace	3	1990, 1997, 1999
7	(United States) Butch Leitzinger	3	1994, 1997, 1999
7	(United Kingdom) Derek Bell	3	1986, 1987, 1989
7	(Colombia) Juan Pablo Montoya	3	2007, 2008, 2013
7	(Mexico) Memo Rojas	3	2008, 2011, 2013
7	(Brazil) Christian Fittipaldi	3	2004, 2014, 2018
7	(Portugal) João Barbosa	3	2010, 2014, 2018
7	(New Zealand) Scott Dixon	3	2006, 2015, 2020
7	(Brazil) Hélio Castroneves	3	2021, 2022, 2023
7	(Brazil) Felipe Nasr	3	2024, 2025, 2026
17	(United Kingdom) Ken Miles	2	1965, 1966
17	(United States) Lloyd Ruby	2	1965, 1966
17	(United States) A. J. Foyt	2	1983, 1985
17	(United States) Al Holbert	2	1986, 1987
17	(United States) Al Unser Jr.	2	1986, 1987
17	(Netherlands) Jan Lammers	2	1988, 1990
17	(United States) John Paul Jr.	2	1982, 1997
17	(United States) Elliott Forbes-Robinson	2	1997, 1999
17	(Italy) Mauro Baldi	2	1998, 2002
17	(Belgium) Didier Theys	2	1998, 2002
17	(South Africa) Wayne Taylor	2	1996, 2005
17	(United States) Terry Borcheller	2	2004, 2010
17	(United States) Scott Sharp	2	1996, 2016
17	(Italy) Max Angelelli	2	2005, 2017
17	(United States) Jordan Taylor	2	2017, 2019
17	(Japan) Kamui Kobayashi	2	2019, 2020
17	(Netherlands) Renger van der Zande	2	2019, 2020
17	(United States) Ricky Taylor	2	2017, 2021
17	(Portugal) Filipe Albuquerque	2	2018, 2021
17	(United Kingdom) Tom Blomqvist	2	2022, 2023
17	(France) Simon Pagenaud	2	2022, 2023

=== Wins by manufacturer ===
Porsche has the most overall victories of any manufacturer with 23, scored by various models, including the road-based 911, 935, and 996. Porsche also won a record 11 consecutive races from 1977 to 1987 and won 18 out of 23 races from 1968 to 1991. The German carmaker also claimed to earn back-to-back wins overall in both the 2024 and 2025 races.

Rank	Manufacturer	Wins	Years
1	(Germany) Porsche	21	1968, 1970, 1971, 1973, 1975, 1977, 1978, 1979, 1980, 1981, 1982, 1983, 1985, 1986, 1987, 1989, 1991, 2003, 2024, 2025, 2026
2	(United States) Riley	10	2005, 2006, 2007, 2008, 2009, 2010, 2011, 2012, 2013, 2015
3	(Italy) Ferrari	5	1963, 1964, 1967, 1972, 1998
4	(United States) Cadillac	4	2017, 2018, 2019, 2020
5	(United States) Riley & Scott	3	1996, 1997, 1999
5	(Japan) Acura	3	2021, 2022, 2023
6	(United States) Ford	2	1965, 1966
6	(United Kingdom) Jaguar	2	1988, 1990
6	(Japan) Nissan	2	1992, 1994
10	(United Kingdom) Lotus	1	1962
10	(United Kingdom) Lola	1	1969
10	(West Germany) BMW	1	1976
10	(United Kingdom) March	1	1984
10	(Japan) Toyota	1	1993
10	(Germany) Kremer	1	1995
10	(United States) Dodge	1	2000
10	(United States) Chevrolet	1	2001
10	(Italy) Dallara	1	2002
10	(United States) Doran	1	2004
10	(United States) Coyote	1	2014
10	(France) Ligier	1	2016

=== Wins by engine manufacturer ===
In addition to their 21 wins as both car and engine manufacturer, Porsche has four wins solely as an engine manufacturer, in 1984, and 1995, and two in the Daytona Prototype era, in 2009 and 2010. General Motors has 10 wins between its Oldsmobile, Pontiac, Chevrolet, and Cadillac brands.

Rank	Engine manufacturer	Wins	Years
1	(Germany) Porsche	25	1968, 1970, 1971, 1973, 1975, 1977, 1978, 1979, 1980, 1981, 1982, 1983, 1984, 1985, 1986, 1987, 1989, 1991, 1995, 2003, 2009, 2010, 2024, 2025, 2026
2	(United States) Ford	6	1965, 1966, 1997, 1999, 2012, 2015
3	(Italy) Ferrari	5	1963, 1964, 1967, 1972, 1998
4	(United States) Cadillac	4	2017, 2018, 2019, 2020
5	(Germany) BMW	3	1976, 2011, 2013
5	(United States) Chevrolet	3	1969, 2001, 2014
5	(Japan) Lexus	3	2006, 2007, 2008
5	(Japan) Acura	3	2021, 2022, 2023
8	(United Kingdom) Jaguar	2	1988, 1990
8	(Japan) Nissan	2	1992, 1994
8	(United States) Pontiac	2	2004, 2005
12	(United Kingdom) Coventry Climax	1	1962
12	(Japan) Toyota	1	1993
12	(United States) Oldsmobile	1	1996
12	(United States) Dodge	1	2000
12	(United Kingdom) Judd	1	2002
12	(Japan) Honda	1	2016

=== Wins by car ===
Rank	Car	Wins	Years
1	(Germany) Porsche 935	6	1978–1983
1	(United States) Riley MkXI	6	2005–2010
3	(Germany) Porsche 962	5	1985–1987, 1989, 1991
4	(United States) Cadillac DPi-V.R	4	2017–2020
5	(Germany) Porsche Carrera RSR	3	1973, 1975, 1977
5	(United States) Riley & Scott Mk III	3	1996–1997, 1999
5	(United States) Riley MkXXVI	3	2012–2013, 2015
5	(Germany) Porsche 963	3	2024–2026
9	(United States) Ford GT40	2	1965–1966
9	(Germany) Porsche 917K	2	1970–1971
9	(Japan) Acura ARX-05	2	2021–2022

== Overall winners ==
Year	Date	Drivers	Team	Car	Tire	Car #	Distance	Laps	Championship
3-hour duration
1962	February 11	(United States) Dan Gurney	(United States) Frank Arciero	Lotus 19B-Coventry Climax	G	96	312.420 mi (502.791 km)	82	International Championship for GT Manufacturers
1963	February 17	(Mexico) Pedro Rodríguez	(United States) North American Racing Team	Ferrari 250 GTO	G	18	307.300 mi (494.551 km)	81	International Championship for GT Manufacturers
2000 km distance
1964	February 16	(Mexico) Pedro Rodríguez (United States) Phil Hill	(United States) North American Racing Team	Ferrari 250 GTO	G	30	1,200 mi (2,000 km)	327	International Championship for GT Manufacturers
1965	February 28	(United Kingdom) Ken Miles (United States) Lloyd Ruby	(United States) Shelby-American Inc.	Ford GT	G	73	1,200 mi (2,000 km)	327	International Championship for GT Manufacturers
24-hour duration
1966	February 5 February 6	(United Kingdom) Ken Miles (United States) Lloyd Ruby	(United States) Shelby-American Inc.	Ford GT40 Mk. II	G	98	2,583.178 mi (4,157.222 km)	678	International Championship for Sports-Prototypes; International Championship for Sports Cars
1967	February 4 February 5	(Italy) Lorenzo Bandini (New Zealand) Chris Amon	(Italy) SpA Ferrari SEFAC	Ferrari 330 P4	F	23	2,537.460 mi (4,083.646 km)	666	International Championship for Sports-Prototypes; International Championship for Sports Cars
1968	February 3 February 4	(United Kingdom) Vic Elford (West Germany) Jochen Neerpasch (West Germany) Rolf Stommelen (Switzerland) Jo Siffert (West Germany) Hans Herrmann	(West Germany) Porsche System Engineering	Porsche 907LH	D	54	2,564.130 mi (4,126.567 km)	673	International Championship for Makes
1969	February 1 February 2	(United States) Mark Donohue (United States) Chuck Parsons	(United States) Roger Penske Sunoco Racing	Lola T70 Mk.3B-Chevrolet	G	6	2,385.060 mi (3,838.382 km)	626	International Championship for Makes
1970	January 31; February 1	(Mexico) Pedro Rodríguez (Finland) Leo Kinnunen (United Kingdom) Brian Redman	(United Kingdom) J.W. Engineering	Porsche 917K	F	2	2,758.440 mi (4,439.279 km)	724	International Championship for Makes
1971	January 30; January 31	(Mexico) Pedro Rodríguez (United Kingdom) Jackie Oliver	(United Kingdom) J.W. Automotive Engineering	Porsche 917K	F	2	2,621.280 mi (4,218.542 km)	688	International Championship for Makes
6-hour duration
1972	February 6	(United States) Mario Andretti (Belgium) Jacky Ickx	(Italy) SpA Ferrari SEFAC	Ferrari 312 PB	F	2	739.140 mi (1,189.531 km)	194	World Championship for Makes
24-hour duration
1973	February 2 February 3	(United States) Peter Gregg (United States) Hurley Haywood	(United States) Brumos Porsche	Porsche Carrera RSR	G	59	2,552.700 mi (4,108.172 km)	670	World Championship for Makes
1974	No race due to energy crisis								
1975	February 1 February 2	(United States) Peter Gregg (United States) Hurley Haywood	(United States) Brumos Porsche	Porsche Carrera RSR	G	60	2,606.040 mi (4,194.015 km)	679	World Championship for Makes; IMSA GT Championship
1976	January 31; February 1	(United States) Peter Gregg (United Kingdom) Brian Redman (United Kingdom) John Fitzpatrick	(United States) BMW of North America	BMW 3.0 CSL	G	59	2,092.800 mi (3,368.035 km)	545	IMSA GT Championship
1977	February 5 February 6	(United States) Hurley Haywood (United States) John Graves (United States) Dave Helmick	(United States) Ecurie Escargot	Porsche Carrera RSR	G	43	2,615.040 mi (4,208.499 km)	681	World Championship for Makes; IMSA GT Championship
1978	February 4 February 5	(United States) Peter Gregg (West Germany) Rolf Stommelen (Netherlands) Toine Hezemans	(United States) Brumos Porsche	Porsche 935/77	G	99	2,611.200 mi (4,202.319 km)	680	World Championship for Makes; IMSA GT Championship
1979	February 3 February 4	(United States) Hurley Haywood (United States) Ted Field (United States) Danny Ongais	(United States) Interscope Racing	Porsche 935/79	G	0	2,626.560 mi (4,227.039 km)	684	World Championship for Makes; IMSA GT Championship
1980	February 2 February 3	(West Germany) Rolf Stommelen (West Germany) Volkert Merl (West Germany) Reinhold Joest	(West Germany) L&M Joest Racing	Porsche 935J	D	2	2,745.600 mi (4,418.615 km)	715	World Championship for Makes; IMSA GT Championship
1981	January 31; February 1	(United States) Bobby Rahal (United Kingdom) Brian Redman (United States) Bob Garretson	(United States) Garretson Racing/Style Auto	Porsche 935 K3	G	9	2,718.720 mi (4,375.355 km)	708	World Endurance Championship; IMSA GT Championship
1982	January 30; January 31	(United States) John Paul Sr. (United States) John Paul Jr. (West Germany) Rolf Stommelen	(United States) JLP Racing	Porsche 935 JLP-3	G	18	2,760.960 mi (4,443.334 km)	719	IMSA GT Championship
1983	February 5 February 6	(United States) A. J. Foyt (United States) Preston Henn (France) Bob Wollek (France) Claude Ballot-Léna	(United States) Henn's Swap Shop Racing	Porsche 935L	G	6	2,373.120 mi (3,819.167 km)	618	IMSA GT Championship
1984	February 4 February 5	(South Africa) Sarel van der Merwe (South Africa) Tony Martin (South Africa) Graham Duxbury	(South Africa) Kreepy Krauly Racing	March 83G-Porsche	G	00	2,476.800 mi (3,986.023 km)	640	IMSA GT Championship
1985	February 2 February 3	(United States) A. J. Foyt (France) Bob Wollek (United States) Al Unser (Belgium) Thierry Boutsen	(United States) Henn's Swap Shop Racing	Porsche 962	G	8	2,502.680 mi (4,027.673 km)	703	IMSA GT Championship
1986	February 1 February 2	(United States) Al Holbert (United Kingdom) Derek Bell (United States) Al Unser Jr.	(United States) Löwenbräu Holbert Racing	Porsche 962	G	14	2,534.720 mi (4,079.236 km)	712	IMSA GT Championship
1987	January 31; February 1	(United States) Al Holbert (United Kingdom) Derek Bell (United States) Chip Robinson (United States) Al Unser Jr.	(United States) Löwenbräu Holbert Racing	Porsche 962	G	14	2,680.680 mi (4,314.136 km)	753	IMSA GT Championship
1988	January 30; January 31	(Brazil) Raul Boesel (United Kingdom) Martin Brundle (Denmark) John Nielsen (Netherlands) Jan Lammers	(United Kingdom) Castrol Jaguar Racing (TWR)	Jaguar XJR-9	D	60	2,591.680 mi (4,170.905 km)	728	IMSA GT Championship
1989	February 4 February 5	(United States) John Andretti (United Kingdom) Derek Bell (France) Bob Wollek	(United States) Miller/BFGoodrich Busby Racing	Porsche 962	BF	67	2,210.760 mi (3,557.873 km)^{A}	621	IMSA GT Championship
1990	February 3 February 4	(United States) Davy Jones (Netherlands) Jan Lammers (United Kingdom) Andy Wallace	(United Kingdom) Castrol Jaguar Racing (TWR)	Jaguar XJR-12D	G	61	2,709.160 mi (4,359.970 km)	761	IMSA GT Championship
1991	February 2 February 3	(United States) Hurley Haywood (Germany) "John Winter" (Germany) Frank Jelinski (France) Henri Pescarolo (France) Bob Wollek	(Germany) Joest Racing	Porsche 962C	G	7	2,559.640 mi (4,119.341 km)	719	IMSA GT Championship
1992	February 1 February 2	(Japan) Masahiro Hasemi (Japan) Kazuyoshi Hoshino (Japan) Toshio Suzuki	(Japan) Nissan Motorsports Intl.	Nissan R91CP	G	23	2,712.720 mi (4,365.700 km)	762	IMSA GT Championship
1993	January 30; January 31	(United States) P. J. Jones (United States) Mark Dismore (United States) Rocky Moran	(United States) All American Racers	Eagle MkIII-Toyota	G	98	2,484.880 mi (3,999.027 km)	698	IMSA GT Championship
1994	February 5 February 6	(United States) Paul Gentilozzi (United States) Scott Pruett (United States) Butch Leitzinger (New Zealand) Steve Millen	(United States) Cunningham Racing	Nissan 300ZX	Y	76	2,516.609 mi (4,050.090 km)	707	IMSA GT Championship
1995	February 4 February 5	(Germany) Jürgen Lässig (France) Christophe Bouchut (Italy) Giovanni Lavaggi (Germany) Marco Werner	(Germany) Kremer Racing	Kremer K8 Spyder-Porsche	G	10	2,456.400 mi (3,953.192 km)	690	IMSA GT Championship
1996	February 3 February 4	(South Africa) Wayne Taylor (United States) Scott Sharp (United States) Jim Pace	(United States) Doyle Racing	Riley & Scott Mk III-Oldsmobile	D	4	2,481.320 mi (3,993.298 km)	697	IMSA GT Championship
1997	February 1 February 2	(United States) Rob Dyson (United Kingdom) James Weaver (United States) Butch Leitzinger (United Kingdom) Andy Wallace (United States) John Paul Jr. (United States) Elliott Forbes-Robinson (United States) John Schneider	(United States) Dyson Racing	Riley & Scott Mk III-Ford	G	20	2,456.400 mi (3,953.192 km)	690	IMSA GT Championship
1998	January 31; February 1	(Italy) Mauro Baldi (Netherlands) Arie Luyendyk (Italy) Giampiero Moretti (Belgium) Didier Theys	(United States) Doran-Moretti Racing	Ferrari 333 SP	Y	30	2,531.160 mi (4,073.507 km)	711	U.S. Road Racing Championship
1999	January 30; January 31	(United States) Elliott Forbes-Robinson (United States) Butch Leitzinger (United Kingdom) Andy Wallace	(United States) Dyson Racing Team Inc.	Riley & Scott Mk III-Ford	G	20	2,520.480 mi (4,056.319 km)	708	U.S. Road Racing Championship
2000	February 5 February 6	(Monaco) Olivier Beretta (France) Dominique Dupuy (Austria) Karl Wendlinger	(France) Viper Team Oreca	Dodge Viper GTS-R	M	91	2,573.880 mi (4,142.258 km)	723	Rolex Sports Car Series
2001	February 3 February 4	(Canada) Ron Fellows (United States) Chris Kneifel (France) Franck Fréon (United States) Johnny O'Connell	(United States) Corvette Racing	Chevrolet Corvette C5-R	G	2	2,335.360 mi (3,758.398 km)	656	Rolex Sports Car Series
2002	February 2 February 3	(Belgium) Didier Theys (Switzerland) Fredy Lienhard (Italy) Max Papis (Italy) Mauro Baldi	(United States) Doran Lista Racing	Dallara SP1-Judd	G	27	2,548.960 mi (4,102.153 km)	716	Rolex Sports Car Series
2003	February 1 February 2	(United States) Kevin Buckler (United States) Michael Schrom (Germany) Timo Bernhard (Germany) Jörg Bergmeister	(United States) The Racer's Group	Porsche 911 GT3-RS	D	66	2,474.200 mi (3,981.839 km)	695	Rolex Sports Car Series
2004	January 31; February 1	(Brazil) Christian Fittipaldi (United States) Terry Borcheller (United States) Forest Barber (United Kingdom) Andy Pilgrim	(United States) Bell Motorsports	Doran JE4-Pontiac	G	54	1,872.80 mi (3,013.98 km)^{A}	526	Rolex Sports Car Series
2005	February 5 February 6	(Italy) Max Angelelli (South Africa) Wayne Taylor (France) Emmanuel Collard	(United States) SunTrust Racing	Riley MkXI-Pontiac	H	10	2,527.924 mi (4,068.300 km)^{A}	710	Rolex Sports Car Series
2006	January 28; January 29	(New Zealand) Scott Dixon (United Kingdom) Dan Wheldon (United States) Casey Mears	(United States) Target Ganassi Racing	Riley MkXI-Lexus	H	02	2,613.38 mi (4,205.82 km)	734	Rolex Sports Car Series
2007	January 27; January 28	(Colombia) Juan Pablo Montoya (Mexico) Salvador Durán (United States) Scott Pruett	(United States) Telmex Ganassi Racing	Riley MkXI-Lexus	H	01	2,377.970 mi (3,826.972 km)	668	Rolex Sports Car Series
2008	January 26; January 27	(Colombia) Juan Pablo Montoya (United Kingdom) Dario Franchitti (United States) Scott Pruett (Mexico) Memo Rojas	(United States) Telmex Ganassi Racing	Riley MkXI-Lexus	P	01	2,474.200 mi (3,981.839 km)	695	Rolex Sports Car Series
2009	January 24; January 25	(United States) David Donohue (Spain) Antonio García (United States) Darren Law (United States) Buddy Rice	(United States) Brumos Racing	Riley MkXI-Porsche	P	58	2,616.600 mi (4,211.009 km)	735	Rolex Sports Car Series
2010	January 30; January 31	(Portugal) João Barbosa (United States) Terry Borcheller (United Kingdom) Ryan Dalziel (Germany) Mike Rockenfeller	(United States) Action Express Racing	Riley MkXI-Porsche	P	9	2,688.14 mi (4,326.15 km)	755	Rolex Sports Car Series
2011	January 29; January 30	(United States) Joey Hand (United States) Graham Rahal (United States) Scott Pruett (Mexico) Memo Rojas	(United States) Telmex Chip Ganassi Racing	Riley MkXX-BMW	C	01	2,563.53 mi (4,125.60 km)	720	Rolex Sports Car Series
2012	January 28; January 29	(United States) A. J. Allmendinger (Brazil) Oswaldo Negri (United States) John Pew (United Kingdom) Justin Wilson	(United States) Michael Shank Racing with Curb-Agajanian	Riley MkXXVI-Ford	C	60	2,709.16 mi (4,359.97 km)	761	Rolex Sports Car Series
2013	January 26; January 27	(Colombia) Juan Pablo Montoya (United States) Charlie Kimball (United States) Scott Pruett (Mexico) Memo Rojas	(United States) Chip Ganassi Racing	Riley MkXXVI-BMW	C	01	2,524.04 mi (4,062.05 km)	709	Rolex Sports Car Series
2014	January 25; January 26	(Portugal) João Barbosa (Brazil) Christian Fittipaldi (France) Sébastien Bourdais	(United States) Action Express Racing	Coyote-Corvette DP	C	5	2,474.200 mi (3,981.839 km)^{A}	695	United SportsCar Championship
2015	January 24; January 25	(New Zealand) Scott Dixon (Brazil) Tony Kanaan (United States) Kyle Larson (United States) Jamie McMurray	(United States) Chip Ganassi Racing	Riley MkXXVI-Ford	C	02	2,634.400 mi (4,239.656 km)	740	United SportsCar Championship
2016	January 30; January 31	(United States) Ed Brown (United States) Johannes van Overbeek (United States) Scott Sharp (Brazil) Pipo Derani	(United States) Tequila Patrón ESM	Ligier JS P2-Honda	C	2	2,620.160 mi (4,216.739 km)	736	IMSA SportsCar Championship
2017	January 28; January 29	(Italy) Max Angelelli (United States) Jeff Gordon (United States) Jordan Taylor (United States) Ricky Taylor	(United States) Wayne Taylor Racing	Cadillac DPi-V.R	C	10	2,346.34 mi (3,776.07 km)	659	IMSA SportsCar Championship
2018	January 27; January 28	(Portugal) João Barbosa (Portugal) Filipe Albuquerque (Brazil) Christian Fittipaldi	(United States) Mustang Sampling Racing	Cadillac DPi-V.R	C	5	2,876.85 mi (4,629.84 km)	808	IMSA SportsCar Championship
2019	January 26; January 27	(United States) Jordan Taylor (Spain) Fernando Alonso (Netherlands) Renger van der Zande (Japan) Kamui Kobayashi	(United States) Wayne Taylor Racing	Cadillac DPi-V.R	M	10	2,011.08 mi (3,236.52 km)^{A}	565	IMSA SportsCar Championship
2020	January 25; January 26	(Australia) Ryan Briscoe (New Zealand) Scott Dixon (Japan) Kamui Kobayashi (Netherlands) Renger van der Zande	(United States) Wayne Taylor Racing	Cadillac DPi-V.R	M	10	2,965.48 mi (4,772.48 km)^{B}	833	IMSA SportsCar Championship
2021	January 30; January 31	(Portugal) Filipe Albuquerque (Brazil) Hélio Castroneves (United States) Alexander Rossi (United States) Ricky Taylor	(United States) Wayne Taylor Racing	Acura ARX-05	M	10	2,872.92 mi (4,623.52 km)	807	IMSA SportsCar Championship
2022	January 29; January 30	(United Kingdom) Tom Blomqvist (United Kingdom) Oliver Jarvis (Brazil) Hélio Castroneves (France) Simon Pagenaud	(United States) Meyer Shank Racing w/ Curb-Agajanian	Acura ARX-05	M	60	2,709.16 mi (4,359.97 km)	761	IMSA SportsCar Championship
2023	January 28; January 29	(United Kingdom) Tom Blomqvist (United States) Colin Braun (Brazil) Hélio Castroneves (France) Simon Pagenaud	(United States) Meyer Shank Racing w/ Curb-Agajanian	Acura ARX-06	M	60	2,787.48 mi (4,486.01 km)	783	IMSA SportsCar Championship
2024	January 27; January 28	(United States) Dane Cameron (Australia) Matt Campbell (Brazil) Felipe Nasr (United States) Josef Newgarden	(Germany) Porsche Penske Motorsport	Porsche 963	M	7	2,815.96 mi (4,531.85 km)	791	IMSA SportsCar Championship
2025	January 25; January 26	(Brazil) Felipe Nasr (United Kingdom) Nick Tandy (Belgium) Laurens Vanthoor	(Germany) Porsche Penske Motorsport	Porsche 963	M	7	2,780.72 mi (4,475.14 km)	781	IMSA SportsCar Championship
2026	January 24; January 25	(Brazil) Felipe Nasr (France) Julien Andlauer (Germany) Laurin Heinrich	(Germany) Porsche Penske Motorsport	Porsche 963	M	7	2,509.8 mi (4,039.1 km)	705	IMSA SportsCar Championship

Notes:

- ^A Races were red flagged during the event due to inclement weather, or a serious accident.
- ^B Race record for most distance covered.

== See also ==
- Petit Le Mans
