= Tony Martin (racing driver) =

South African racing driver

Tony Martin is a racing driver from Durban, South Africa. He was the 1980 South African Drivers Champion, and winner of the Daytona 24 Hours in 1984 driving for Kreepy Krauly Racing, an all-South African team in a March 83G-Porsche. He shared the win with Sarel van der Merwe and Graham Duxbury.

Martin was born to WWII veteran Ian Martin and Iris Martin (née Momple), the second of two sons.

Martin lives in Umhlanga Rocks in Kwa-Zulu Natal with his second wife. He continues to race, amongst other things, hand-made AC Cobra replicas which he hand crafts in South Africa under the brand name Backdraft Racing.
