= Graham Duxbury =

South African racing driver

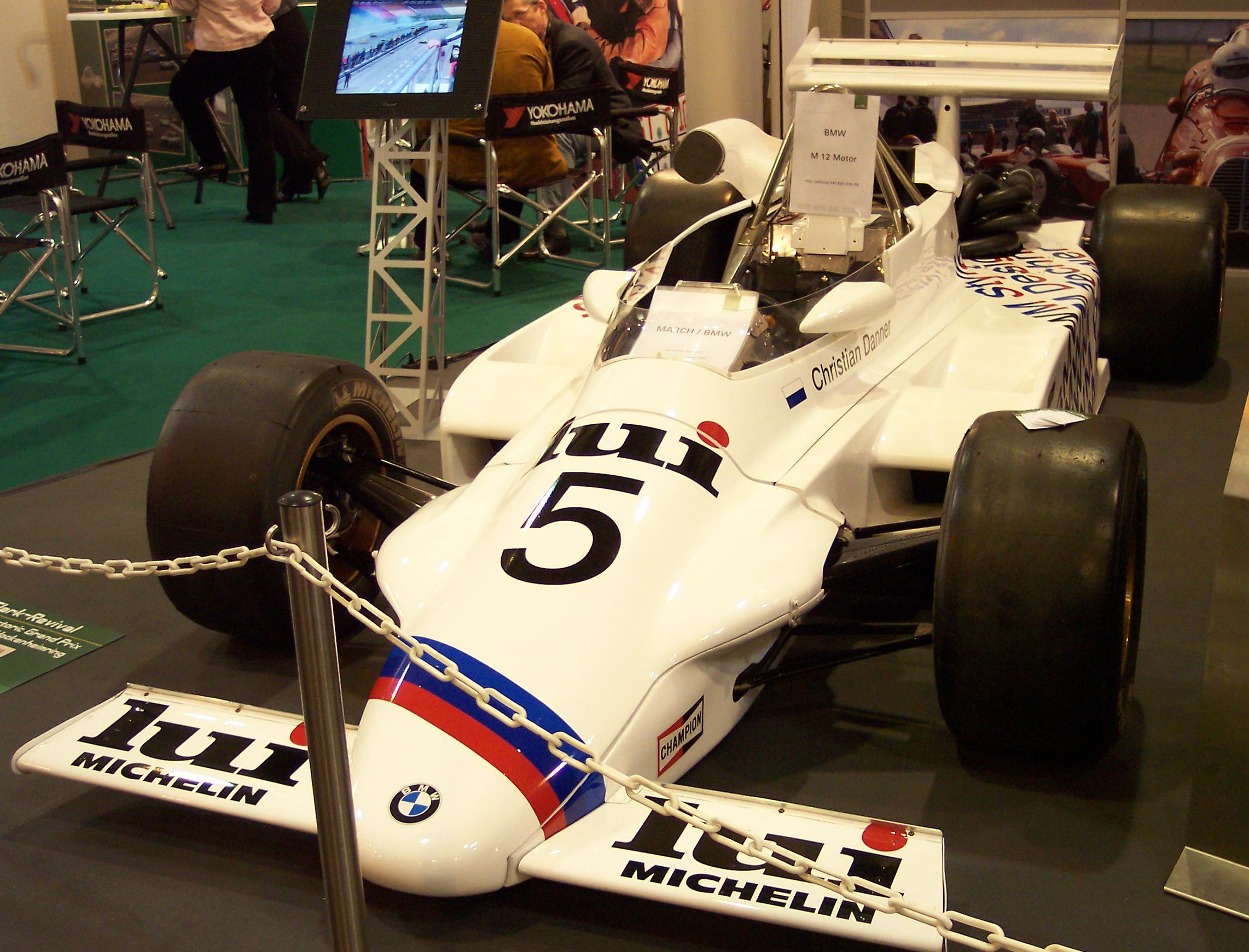
- Born: December 1, 1955 (age 70); Johannesburg, South Africa
- Occupations: Engineer, Racing automobile driver

Graham Duxbury (born 1 December 1954) is a South African racing driver, business man and motorsport commentator. Duxbury won the South African National Drivers Championship in 1982, initially driving a March 78B, before taking delivery of a ground effect March 822. He won the Daytona 24 Hours in 1984 driving for Kreepy Krauly Racing, an all-South African team in a March 83G-Porsche engineered by Ken Howes. He shared the win with Sarel van der Merwe and Tony Martin.

In 2019, Duxbury was inaugurated into the South African Hall of fame, joining South African National Drivers Champions, Ian Scheckter and Wayne Taylor who have previously been honoured.

Duxbury is the chief executive officer of Duxbury Networking, a South African-based Specialist Networking Distributor.
