= Sarel van der Merwe =

South African rally and racing driver (born 1946)

- Nationality: South Africa
- Born: Sarel Daniel van der Merwe; 5 December 1946 (age 79) Pretoria, South Africa
- Retired: 2002

Championship titles
- 1975, 1977-1985, 1988 1994 1994, 2001: South African Rally Drivers Championship; South African Saloon Car Championship; South African Modified Saloon Car Championship

Awards
- 1976 1997 2002: Springbok Colours; South African National Colours; MSA Lifetime Achievement Award

NASCAR Cup Series career
- 1 race run over 1 year
- Best finish: 78th (1990)
- First race: 1990 Budweiser at the Glen (Watkins Glen)
Wins	Top tens	Poles
0	0	0

Sarel Daniel van der Merwe (born 5 December 1946) is a former rally and racing driver, who was a multiple South African Rally Drivers Champion. He is sometimes referred to by his nickname "Supervan".

Van der Merwe won the South African Rally Drivers Championship a record eleven times in 1975, from 1977 to 1985 and in 1988. Van der Merwe's IMSA career included time at Hendrick Motorsports during the Corvette GTP era, which also led to one NASCAR Winston Cup start for the team. This would be at Watkins Glen in 1990 when Hendrick driver Darrell Waltrip was recuperating from a severe leg injury at the Firecracker 400 final practice. Van der Merwe finished 24th by the end of the race. Van der Merwe attempted to qualify for the 1988 Daytona 500 in a Hendrick-owned car, but failed to make the race. He also held the SA Saloon Car Championship in 1994, SA Modified Saloon Car Championship (1994 & 2001), and won the 1996 Castrol International Rally. He was awarded the Motorsport South Africa (MSA) Lifetime Achievement award in 2002.

== Racing career ==
Van der Merwe began his racing career in 1967 racing saloon cars. His international career took off in 1983 in the IMSA series in the United States, with his most notable win in the 1984 24 Hours of Daytona race driving for Kreepy Krauly Racing, an all-South African team in a March 83G-Porsche. He shared the win with Graham Duxbury and Tony Martin. Van der Merwe did well in the 1984 24 Hours of Le Mans where he finished third on debut. In the 1986 Le Mans race, van der Merwe pulled in a lap early, and Jo Gartner took over. A lap later the suspension broke and the car veered off the Mulsanne Straight in the middle of the night and Gartner was killed.

Van der Merwe's father Sarel Sr. also had a history of racing and won an award from the Auto Union company in Germany. Van der Merwe then moved up the ranks to sport a works team Ford Escort Mk II BDA. After leaving Ford because of a disagreement, Van der Merwe had a short stint in several Datsun cars and would later race with Audi and Volkswagen. .His co-driver and navigator was Franz Boshoff.

Van der Merwe retired from competitive motor racing in November 2002 after Round 12 of the Vodacom Power Tour.

=== Other activities ===
Van der Merwe also worked as a correspondent for South African motor publications in the 1970s.

== Racing record ==
=== Complete WRC results ===
Year	Entrant	Car	1	2	3	4	5	6	7	8	9	10	11	12	WDC	Pts
1980	David Sutton Cars Ltd	Ford Escort RS1800	MON	SWE	POR	KEN	GRC	ARG	FIN	NZL	ITA	FRA	GBR; Ret	CIV	NC	0
1984	Audi Sport	Audi Quattro A2	MON	SWE	POR; Ret	KEN	FRA	GRE	NZL	ARG	FIN	ITA	CIV	GBR	NC	0

=== 24 Hours of Le Mans results ===
Year	Team	Co-drivers	Car	Class	Laps	Pos.	Class pos.
1984	(United Kingdom) Skoal Bandit Porsche Team (United Kingdom) John Fitzpatrick Racing	(United Kingdom) David Hobbs (France) Philippe Streiff	Porsche 956	C1	351	**3rd**	**3rd**
1985	(Germany) Porsche Kremer Racing	(South Africa) George Fouché (Switzerland) Mario Hytten	Porsche 956B	C1	361	5th	5th
1986	(Germany) Porsche Kremer Racing	(Austria) Jo Gartner (Japan) Kunimitsu Takahashi	Porsche 962C	C1	169	DNF	DNF
1987	(Germany) Joest Racing	(United Kingdom) David Hobbs (United States) Chip Robinson	Porsche 962C	C1	4	DNF	DNF
1987	(Germany) Joest Racing	(Sweden) Stanley Dickens (United States) Hurley Haywood (Germany) Frank Jelinski	Porsche 962C	C1	7	DNF	DNF
1988	(Germany) Porsche AG	(Australia) Vern Schuppan (France) Bob Wollek	Porsche 962C	C1	192	DNF	DNF
1989	(Switzerland) Brun Motorsport (Japan) From-A Racing	(Germany) Harald Grohs (Japan) Akihiko Nakaya	Porsche 962C	C1	78	DNF	DNF
1990	(Germany) Porsche Kremer Racing	(Japan) Hideki Okada (Japan) Kunimitsu Takahashi	Porsche 962CK6	C1	279	24th	21st

=== NASCAR ===
(key) (Bold – Pole position awarded by qualifying time. Italics – Pole position earned by points standings or practice time. * – Most laps led.)

==== Winston Cup Series ====
NASCAR Winston Cup Series results
Year	Team	No.	Make	1	2	3	4	5	6	7	8	9	10	11	12	13	14	15	16	17	18	19	20	21	22	23	24	25	26	27	28	29	NWCC	Pts	Ref
1988	Hendrick Motorsports	18	Chevy	DAY; DNQ	RCH	CAR	ATL	DAR	BRI	NWS	MAR	TAL	CLT	DOV	RSD	POC	MCH	DAY	POC	TAL	GLN	MCH	BRI	DAR	RCH	DOV	MAR	CLT	NWS	CAR	PHO	ATL	NA	-	
1990	Hendrick Motorsports	17	Chevy	DAY	RCH	CAR	ATL	DAR	BRI	NWS	MAR	TAL	CLT	DOV	SON	POC	MCH	DAY	POC	TAL	GLN; 24	MCH	BRI	DAR	RCH	DOV	MAR	NWS	CLT	CAR	PHO	ATL	78th	91	

Sporting positions
Preceded by Herman Fekken	SA Rally Drivers Championship; 1975	Succeeded by Jan Hettema
Preceded by None	SA Group 1 / Group A Championship; 1977	Succeeded by Giovanni Piazzo-Musso
Preceded by Jan Hettema	SA Rally Drivers Championship; 1977 to 1985	Succeeded by Hannes Grobler
Preceded by Geoff Mortimer	SA Rally Drivers Championship; 1988	Succeeded by Serge Damseaux
Preceded by Terry Moss	SA Saloon Car Championship; 1994	Succeeded by Michael Briggs
Preceded by None	SA Modified Saloon Car Championship; 1994	Succeeded by Charl Wilken
Preceded by R du Plessis	SA Modified Saloon Car Championship; 2001	Succeeded by Johan Fourie
