= Lola T600 =

Racing car

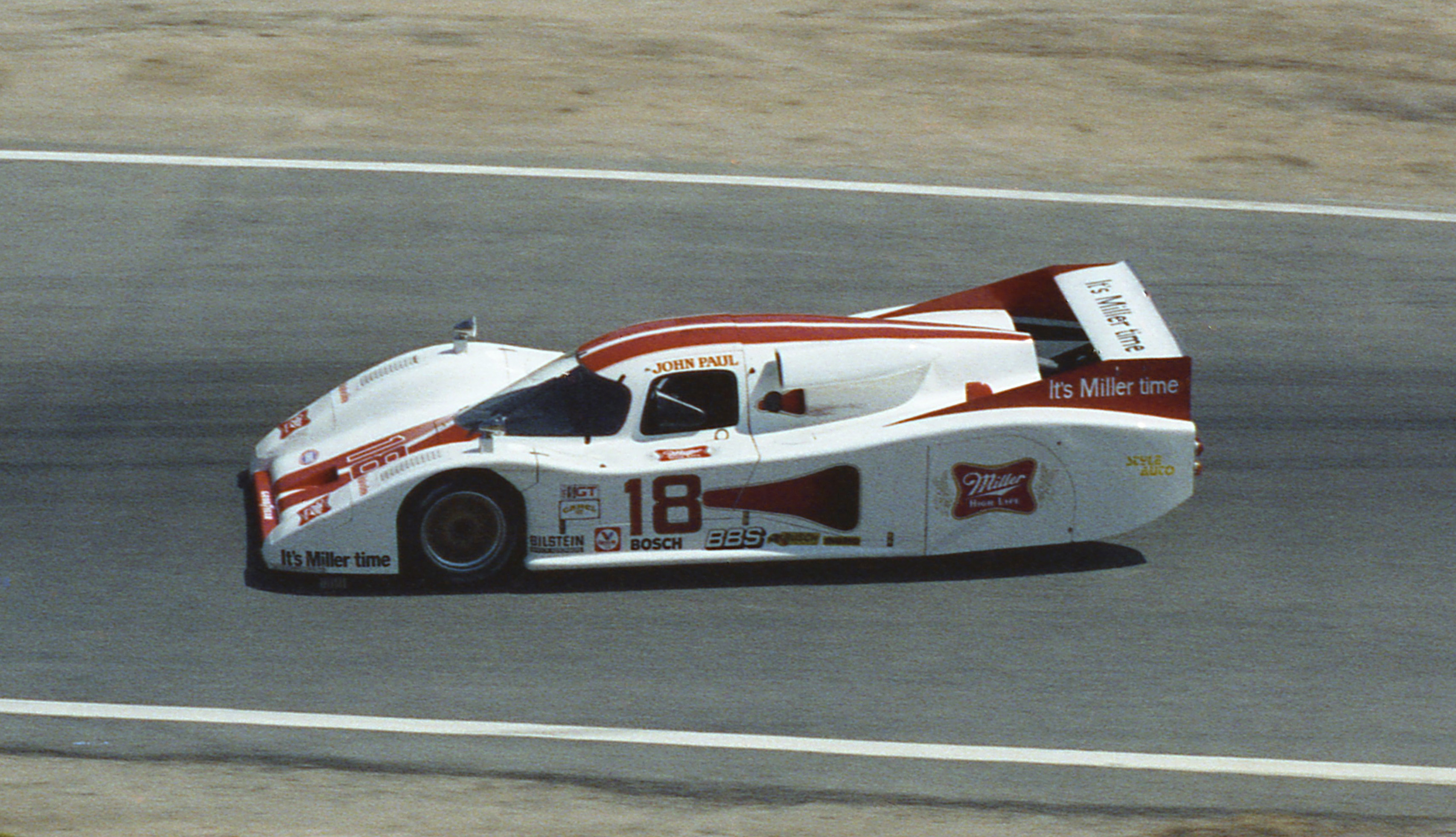
- Category: IMSA GTP & Group C
- Constructor: Lola Cars
- Designers: Max Sardou; Eric Broadley

Technical specifications
- Chassis: Aluminum monocoque
- Suspension (front): Double wishbones, coil-over dampers
- Suspension (rear): Double wishbones, coil-over dampers
- Engine: Ford 6,000 cc (366.1 cu in), mid-mounted, NA pushrod V8; Cosworth DFL, 3,298 cc (201.3 cu in), mid-mounted, NA DOHC V8; Porsche, mid-mounted, Turbo Flat 6
- Transmission: Hewland 5 speed manual

Competition history
- Notable entrants: Cooke-Woods Racing; J.L.P. Racing; Interscope Racing; Conte Racing; Bayside Racing
- Notable drivers: Brian Redman; John Paul Jr. Danny Ongais; Hurley Haywood; John Morton; Ted Field
- Debut: 1981 IMSA Camel GT Round #5, Laguna Seca
Races	Wins	Poles	F/Laps
70	10	10	18
- Constructors' Championships: 0
- Drivers' Championships: 2

The Lola T600 was a racing car introduced in 1981 by Lola Cars as a customer chassis. It was the first GT prototype race car to incorporate ground-effect tunnels for downforce. The revolutionary aerodynamic design of the T600 was widely imitated throughout the 1980s by International Motor Sports Association (IMSA) and Group C prototype cars. The Lola T600 ran initially in the U.S.-based IMSA GT series and later in European Group C races.

A total of 12 chassis were built.

== Development ==
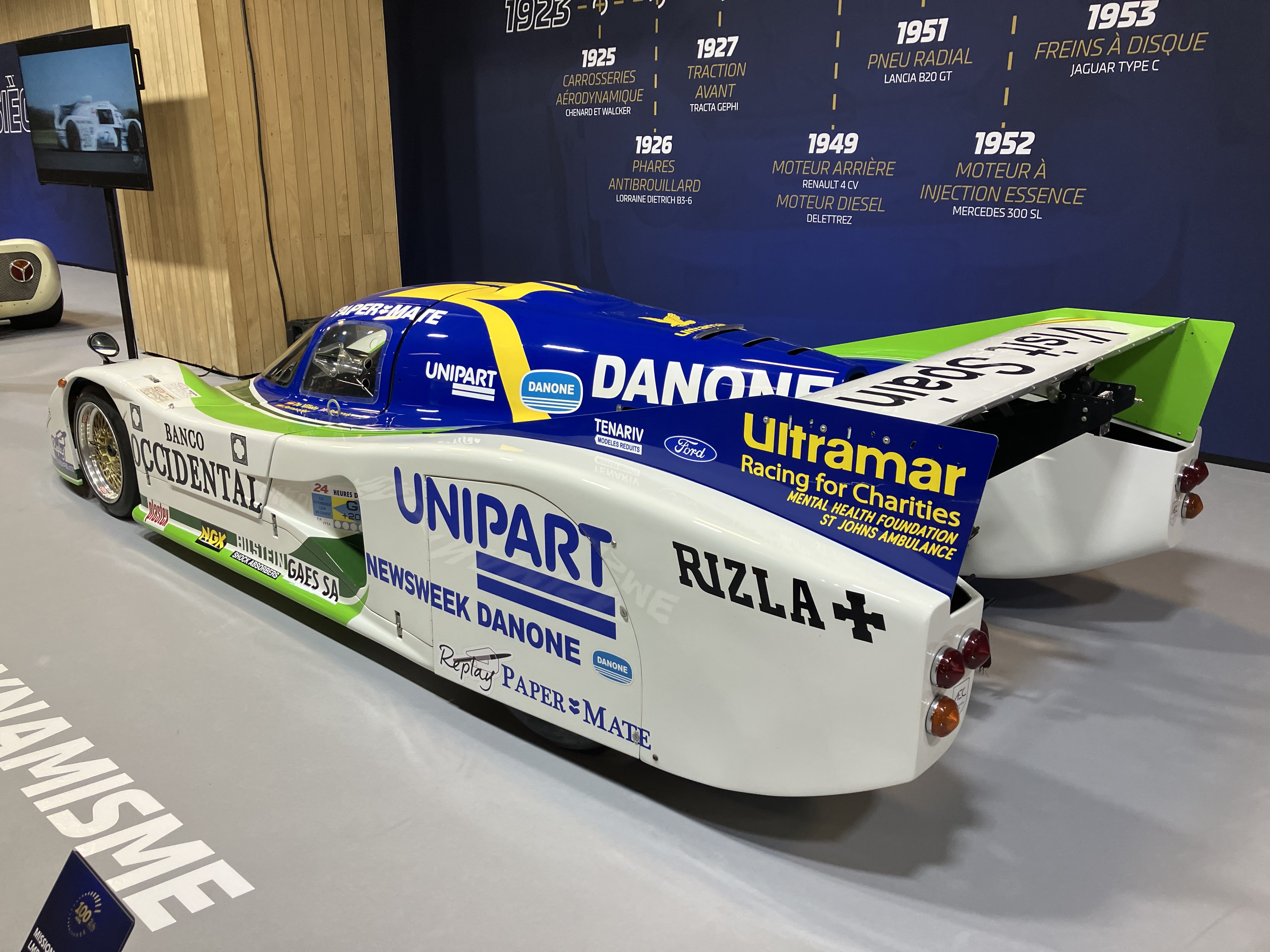
Rear view of a T600

At the end of the 1980 season, it seemed that the Porsche 935 Turbo would continue to dominate the International Motor Sports Association (IMSA) Championship. Fearing that fans would lose interest in a series dominated by a single marque, IMSA officials announced the new Grand Touring Prototype category. The GTP category was also consistent with the FIA's plan to introduce a prototype formula to the World Endurance Championship in 1982 (Group C), superseding production-based silhouette cars like the Porsche 935.

Brian Redman asked for Lola Cars to develop a GTP spec racer based on a T70 chassis, fitted with a new bodywork and a Chevy 6.0L V8 engine developing around 600 bhp. Lola's Eric Broadley, however, wanted a new chassis and bodywork developed specifically for the new IMSA GTP regulations. He hired aerodynamicist Max Sardou to design a ground effects underbody for the car. Cooke-Woods Racing were the first customer and also helped develop the car.

== Racing History ==
=== IMSA Championship ===
1981

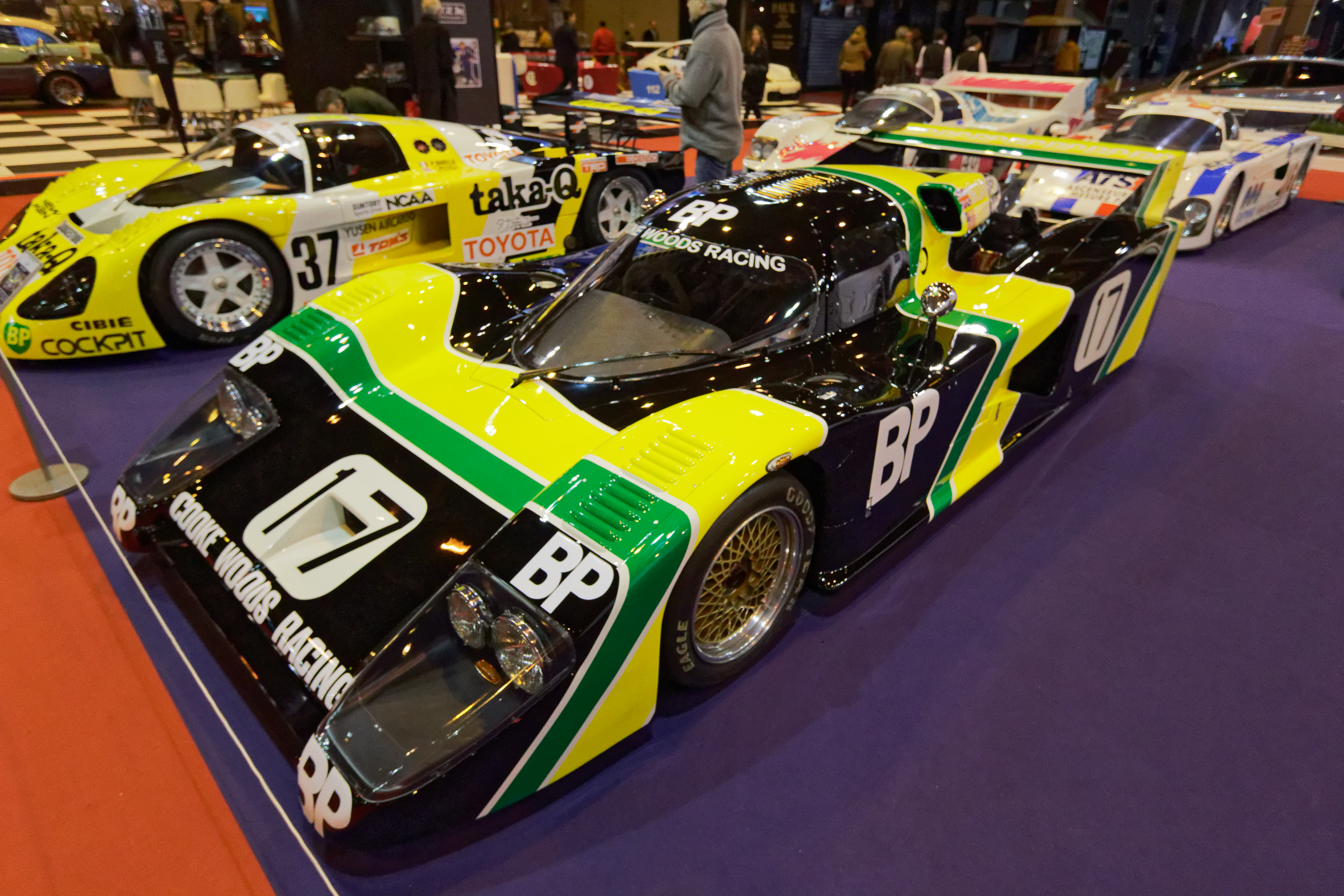
Cooke-Woods Racing's T600

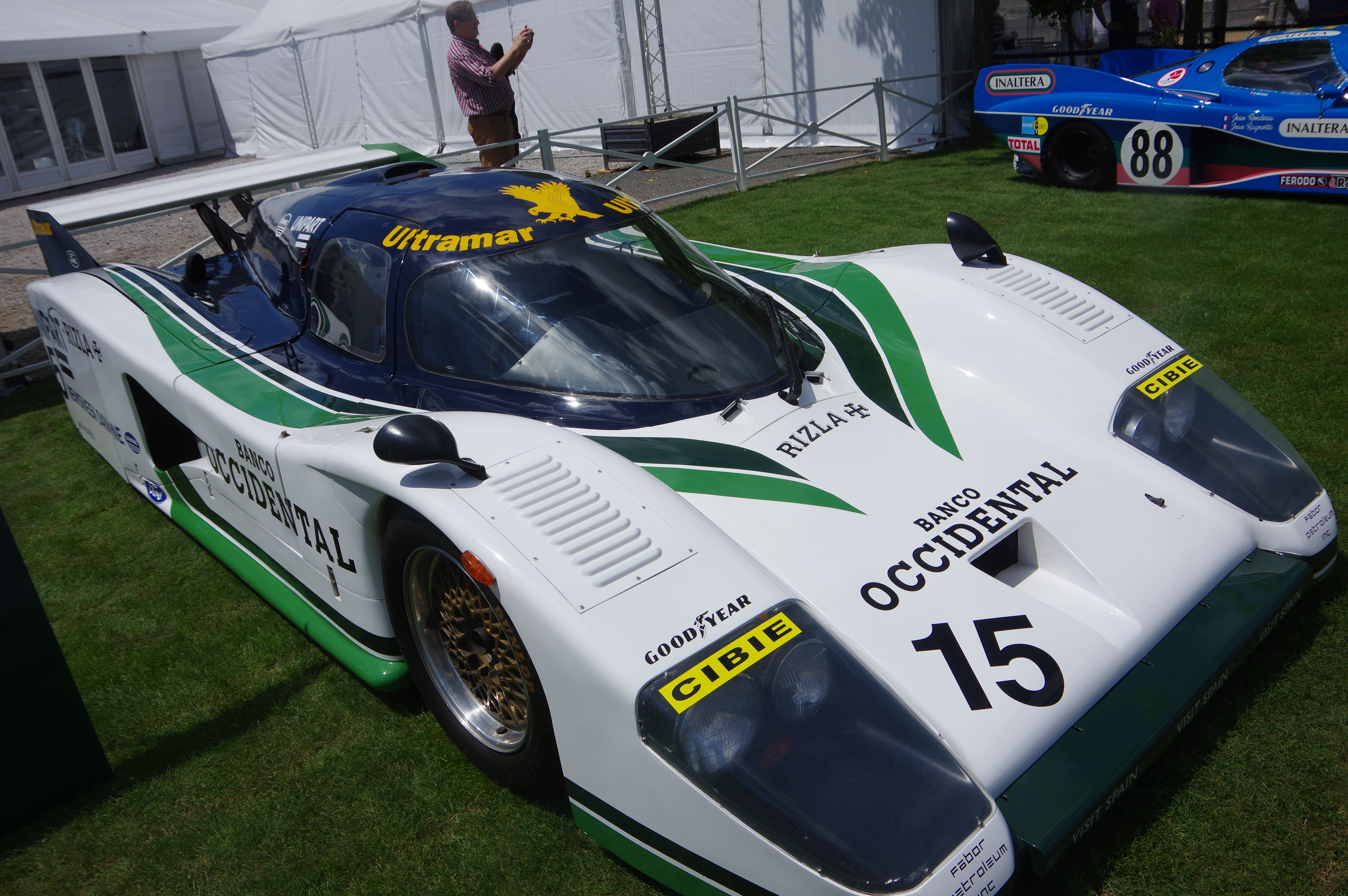
GRID Team Lola's T600 that raced at the 1981 24 Hours of Le Mans

Cooke-Woods Racing entered chassis #HU01 for the fifth race of 1981 season, at Laguna Seca, with Redman driving. The team achieved victory in its debut race, followed by wins at Lime Rock, Mid Ohio, Portland and Road Atlanta. The car proved extremely reliable, winning the IMSA title and knocking Porsche from the top of the championship standings for the first time since 1977. Lola Cars sold 11 additional T600s on the strength of this performance. Among the drivers fielding T600s were Chris Cord and John Paul Jr. (chassis #HU04 and #HU05), though neither achieved the success of Cooke-Woods effort.

1982

Cooke-Woods Racing became Cooke Racing after Roy Woods and Redman left the team and never again approached its dominant form of 1981. J.L.P. Racing and Cord Racing returned, while additional Lolas from Interscope appeared in the grid, raced by Danny Ongais, Ted Field and Bill Whittington. Interscope won four races but John Paul Jr. took the Championship driving both a T600 and Porsche 935s, scoring one of his seven victories in the Lola. Field finished second in standings.

1983

Ted Field fitted a 700 hp Chevrolet V6 3.4L turbo engine in one of the Interscope T600s, which proved to be a fast but unreliable combination. Other Lolas fielded by John Kalagian and Conte Racing employed the ubiquitous Chevy V8, while Bayside Racing installed a Porsche 935 turbo engine in their T600. Newer GTP designs from March and Jaguar, however, eclipsed the aging Lola. T600s scored a handful of podium finishes, but its days as a front-running chassis were numbered.

1984 onwards

Largely reduced to the role of grid filler, Lola T600s occasionally posted top-ten finishes, powered variously by engines from Chevy, Ford and Porsche, but the design proved too outdated to be competitive. A T600 appeared for the last time at an IMSA race in 1987.
