= 1986 1000 km of Spa =

Motor race in Belgium

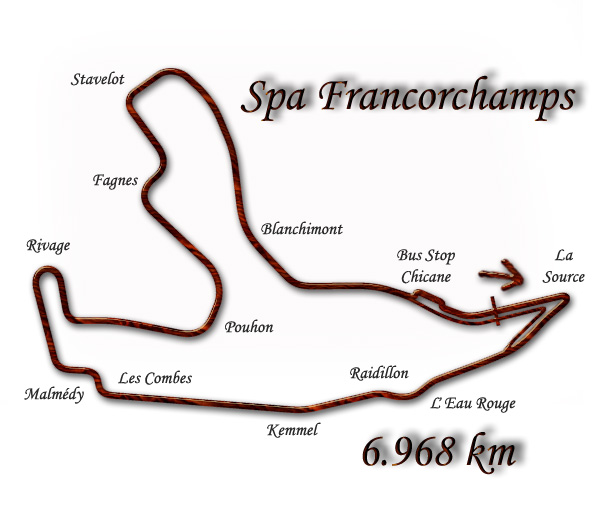
Layout of the Circuit de Spa-Francorchamps (1981–1993, 1995–2003)

The 1986 Kouros 1000 km Spa was the eighth round of the 1986 World Sports-Prototype Championship. It took place at the Circuit de Spa-Francorchamps, Belgium on September 14, 1986.

== Official results ==
Class winners in bold. Cars failing to complete 75% of the winner's distance marked as Not Classified (NC).

Pos	Class	No	Team	Drivers	Chassis	Tyre	Laps
Pos	Class	No	Team	Drivers	Engine	Tyre	Laps
1	**C1**	**17**	**(Switzerland) Brun Motorsport**	**(Belgium) Thierry Boutsen (Germany) Frank Jelinski**	**Porsche 962C**	**MI**	**145**
1	**C1**	**17**	**(Switzerland) Brun Motorsport**	**(Belgium) Thierry Boutsen (Germany) Frank Jelinski**	**Porsche Type-935 2.8L Turbo Flat-6**	**MI**	**145**
2	C1	52	(United Kingdom) Silk Cut Jaguar	(Netherlands) Jan Lammers (United Kingdom) Derek Warwick	Jaguar XJR-6	**D**	145
2	C1	52	(United Kingdom) Silk Cut Jaguar	(Netherlands) Jan Lammers (United Kingdom) Derek Warwick	Jaguar 6.5L V12	**D**	145
3	C1	1	(Germany) Rothmans Porsche	(Germany) Hans-Joachim Stuck (United Kingdom) Derek Bell	Porsche 962C	**D**	145
3	C1	1	(Germany) Rothmans Porsche	(Germany) Hans-Joachim Stuck (United Kingdom) Derek Bell	Porsche Type-935 3.0L Turbo Flat-6	**D**	145
4	C1	7	(Germany) Blaupunkt Joest Racing	(Germany) Klaus Ludwig (Italy) Paolo Barilla	Porsche 956B	**G**	144
4	C1	7	(Germany) Blaupunkt Joest Racing	(Germany) Klaus Ludwig (Italy) Paolo Barilla	Porsche Type-935 2.6L Turbo Flat-6	**G**	144
5	C1	51	(United Kingdom) Silk Cut Jaguar	(France) Jean-Louis Schlesser (United States) Eddie Cheever	Jaguar XJR-6	**D**	143
5	C1	51	(United Kingdom) Silk Cut Jaguar	(France) Jean-Louis Schlesser (United States) Eddie Cheever	Jaguar 6.5L V12	**D**	143
6	C1	61	(Switzerland) Kouros Racing Team	(France) Henri Pescarolo (New Zealand) Mike Thackwell	Sauber C9	**G**	140
6	C1	61	(Switzerland) Kouros Racing Team	(France) Henri Pescarolo (New Zealand) Mike Thackwell	Mercedes-Benz M117 5.0L Turbo V8	**G**	140
7	C1	2	(Germany) Rothmans Porsche	(Germany) Jochen Mass (France) Bob Wollek	Porsche 962C	**D**	140
7	C1	2	(Germany) Rothmans Porsche	(Germany) Jochen Mass (France) Bob Wollek	Porsche Type-935 3.0L Turbo Flat-6	**D**	140
8	C1	8	(Germany) Joest Racing	(Germany) "John Winter" (Australia) Vern Schuppan (Denmark) Kris Nissen	Porsche 956	**G**	139
8	C1	8	(Germany) Joest Racing	(Germany) "John Winter" (Australia) Vern Schuppan (Denmark) Kris Nissen	Porsche Type-935 2.6L Turbo Flat-6	**G**	139
9	C1	19	(Switzerland) Brun Motorsport	(Belgium) Didier Theys (Italy) Massimo Sigala (Switzerland) Walter Brun	Porsche 956	**MI**	139
9	C1	19	(Switzerland) Brun Motorsport	(Belgium) Didier Theys (Italy) Massimo Sigala (Switzerland) Walter Brun	Porsche Type-935 2.8L Turbo Flat-6	**MI**	139
10	C1	14	(United Kingdom) Liqui Moly Equipe	(United Kingdom) James Weaver (Italy) Mauro Baldi	Porsche 956 GTi	**G**	135
10	C1	14	(United Kingdom) Liqui Moly Equipe	(United Kingdom) James Weaver (Italy) Mauro Baldi	Porsche Type-935 2.8L Turbo Flat-6	**G**	135
11	C1	33	(Spain) Danone Porsche España (United Kingdom) John Fitzpatrick Racing	(Spain) Emilio de Villota (Spain) Fermín Vélez	Porsche 956B	**G**	134
11	C1	33	(Spain) Danone Porsche España (United Kingdom) John Fitzpatrick Racing	(Spain) Emilio de Villota (Spain) Fermín Vélez	Porsche Type-935 2.6L Turbo Flat-6	**G**	134
12	C1	10	(Germany) Porsche Kremer Racing	(Italy) Bruno Giacomelli (Germany) Volker Weidler	Porsche 962C	**Y**	134
12	C1	10	(Germany) Porsche Kremer Racing	(Italy) Bruno Giacomelli (Germany) Volker Weidler	Porsche Type-935 2.8L Turbo Flat-6	**Y**	134
13	**C2**	**79**	**(United Kingdom) Ecurie Ecosse**	**(United Kingdom) Ray Mallock (Belgium) Marc Duez**	**Ecosse C286**	**A**	**133**
13	**C2**	**79**	**(United Kingdom) Ecurie Ecosse**	**(United Kingdom) Ray Mallock (Belgium) Marc Duez**	**Rover V64V 3.0L V6**	**A**	**133**
14	C2	70	(United Kingdom) Spice Engineering	(United Kingdom) Gordon Spice (United Kingdom) Ray Bellm	Spice SE86C	**A**	132
14	C2	70	(United Kingdom) Spice Engineering	(United Kingdom) Gordon Spice (United Kingdom) Ray Bellm	Ford Cosworth DFL 3.3L V8	**A**	132
15	C2	75	(United Kingdom) ADA Engineering	(United Kingdom) Evan Clements (United Kingdom) Ian Harrower	Gebhardt JC843	**A**	123
15	C2	75	(United Kingdom) ADA Engineering	(United Kingdom) Evan Clements (United Kingdom) Ian Harrower	Ford Cosworth DFL 3.3L V8	**A**	123
16	C1	45	(France) Patrick Oudet Vetir Racing	(France) Patrick Oudet (France) Jean-Claude Justice	Rondeau M382	**D**	122
16	C1	45	(France) Patrick Oudet Vetir Racing	(France) Patrick Oudet (France) Jean-Claude Justice	Ford Cosworth DFL 3.3L V8	**D**	122
17	C2	90	Jens Winther Denmark	(Denmark) Jens Winther (Switzerland) Angelo Pallavicini	URD C83	**A**	121
17	C2	90	Jens Winther Denmark	(Denmark) Jens Winther (Switzerland) Angelo Pallavicini	BMW M88 3.5L I6	**A**	121
18	C1	66	(United Kingdom) Cosmic Racing Promotions	(Greece) Costas Los (United Kingdom) Tiff Needell	March 84G	**A**	114
18	C1	66	(United Kingdom) Cosmic Racing Promotions	(Greece) Costas Los (United Kingdom) Tiff Needell	Porsche Type-935 2.6L Turbo Flat-6	**A**	114
19	C2	72	(United Kingdom) John Bartlett Racing	(United Kingdom) David Mercer (United Kingdom) Ian Khan (Sweden) Kenneth Leim	Bardon DB1	?	112
19	C2	72	(United Kingdom) John Bartlett Racing	(United Kingdom) David Mercer (United Kingdom) Ian Khan (Sweden) Kenneth Leim	Ford Cosworth DFL 3.3L V8	?	112
20	C2	102	(France) Lucien Rossiaud	(France) Lucien Rossiaud (France) Bruno Sotty (France) Noël del Bello	Rondeau M379C	**A**	109
20	C2	102	(France) Lucien Rossiaud	(France) Lucien Rossiaud (France) Bruno Sotty (France) Noël del Bello	Ford Cosworth DFV 3.0L V8	**A**	109
21	C2	77	(United Kingdom) Chamberlain Engineering	(United Kingdom) Will Hoy (United Kingdom) Gareth Chapman	Tiga TS85	**A**	107
21	C2	77	(United Kingdom) Chamberlain Engineering	(United Kingdom) Will Hoy (United Kingdom) Gareth Chapman	Hart 418T 1.8L Turbo I4	**A**	107
22	C2	99	(United Kingdom) Roy Baker Racing Tiga	(United Kingdom) Les Blackburn (Denmark) Thorkild Thyrring	Tiga GC286	**A**	104
22	C2	99	(United Kingdom) Roy Baker Racing Tiga	(United Kingdom) Les Blackburn (Denmark) Thorkild Thyrring	Ford Cosworth BDT 1.7L Turbo I4	**A**	104
23 NC	C2	92	(France) Automobiles Louis Descartes	(France) Louis Descartes (France) Jacques Heuclin (France) Hubert Striebig	ALD 02	**A**	100
23 NC	C2	92	(France) Automobiles Louis Descartes	(France) Louis Descartes (France) Jacques Heuclin (France) Hubert Striebig	BMW M88 3.5L I6	**A**	100
24 DNF	C2	89	(Norway) Martin Schanche Racing	(Norway) Martin Schanche (Republic of Ireland) David Kennedy	Argo JM19	**G**	98
24 DNF	C2	89	(Norway) Martin Schanche Racing	(Norway) Martin Schanche (Republic of Ireland) David Kennedy	Zakspeed 1.9L Turbo I4	**G**	98
25 DNF	C1	18	(Switzerland) Brun Motorsport	(Argentina) Oscar Larrauri (Spain) Jesús Pareja	Porsche 962C	**MI**	72
25 DNF	C1	18	(Switzerland) Brun Motorsport	(Argentina) Oscar Larrauri (Spain) Jesús Pareja	Porsche Type-935 2.8L Turbo Flat-6	**MI**	72
26 DNF	C1	20	(United Kingdom) Tiga Team	(United Kingdom) Tim Lee-Davey (Australia) Neil Crang	Tiga GC86	**D**	67
26 DNF	C1	20	(United Kingdom) Tiga Team	(United Kingdom) Tim Lee-Davey (Australia) Neil Crang	Ford Cosworth DFL 3.3L Turbo V8	**D**	67
27 DNF	C2	80	(Italy) Carma FF SRL	(Italy) Ruggero Melgrati (Italy) Martino Finotto (Italy) Carlo Facetti	Alba AR6	**A**	46
27 DNF	C2	80	(Italy) Carma FF SRL	(Italy) Ruggero Melgrati (Italy) Martino Finotto (Italy) Carlo Facetti	Carma FF 1.9L Turbo I4	**A**	46
28 DNF	C2	97	(United Kingdom) Roy Baker Racing Tiga	(Morocco) Max Cohen-Olivar (United Kingdom) John Sheldon (United Kingdom) John Andrews	Tiga GC285	**A**	44
28 DNF	C2	97	(United Kingdom) Roy Baker Racing Tiga	(Morocco) Max Cohen-Olivar (United Kingdom) John Sheldon (United Kingdom) John Andrews	Ford Cosworth BDT 1.7L Turbo I4	**A**	44
29 DNF	GTP	21	(United Kingdom) Richard Cleare Racing	(United Kingdom) Richard Cleare (United Kingdom) David Leslie	March 85G	**G**	40
29 DNF	GTP	21	(United Kingdom) Richard Cleare Racing	(United Kingdom) Richard Cleare (United Kingdom) David Leslie	Porsche Type-962 3.2L Turbo Flat-6	**G**	40
30 DNF	C2	104	(France) Jean-Claude Ferrarin	(France) Jean-Claude Ferrarin (France) Philippe Mazué	Isolia 001	?	24
30 DNF	C2	104	(France) Jean-Claude Ferrarin	(France) Jean-Claude Ferrarin (France) Philippe Mazué	Ford Cosworth DFV 3.0L V8	?	24
31 DNF	C2	98	(United Kingdom) Roy Baker Racing Tiga	(Australia) Michael Hall (United Kingdom) David Andrews	Tiga GC286	**A**	22
31 DNF	C2	98	(United Kingdom) Roy Baker Racing Tiga	(Australia) Michael Hall (United Kingdom) David Andrews	Ford Cosworth BDT 1.7L Turbo I4	**A**	22
32 DNF	C1	9	(Germany) Obermaier Racing Team	(Germany) Jürgen Lässig (United Kingdom) Dudley Wood (Belgium) Hervé Regout	Porsche 956	**G**	11
32 DNF	C1	9	(Germany) Obermaier Racing Team	(Germany) Jürgen Lässig (United Kingdom) Dudley Wood (Belgium) Hervé Regout	Porsche Type-935 2.6L Turbo Flat-6	**G**	11
33 DNF	C2	83	(Italy) Luigi Taverna Techno Racing	(Italy) Luigi Taverna (Italy) Gianpiero Lauro (Italy) Piercarlo Ghinzani	Alba AR3	**A**	7
33 DNF	C2	83	(Italy) Luigi Taverna Techno Racing	(Italy) Luigi Taverna (Italy) Gianpiero Lauro (Italy) Piercarlo Ghinzani	Ford Cosworth DFL 3.3L V8	**A**	7
DNS	C1	63	(Germany) Ernst Schuster	(Germany) Ernst Schuster (Germany) Siegfried Brunn	Porsche 936C	**D**	-
DNS	C1	63	(Germany) Ernst Schuster	(Germany) Ernst Schuster (Germany) Siegfried Brunn	Porsche Type-962 2.8L Turbo Flat-6	**D**	-
DNS	C2	95	(France) Roland Bassaler	(France) Dominique Lacaud (France) Roland Bassaler (France) Gérard Tremblay	Sauber SHS C6	**A**	-
DNS	C2	95	(France) Roland Bassaler	(France) Dominique Lacaud (France) Roland Bassaler (France) Gérard Tremblay	BMW M88 3.5L I6	**A**	-
DNQ	C2	105	(Italy) Kelmar Racing	(Italy) Pasquale Barberio (Italy) Maurizio Gellini	Tiga GC85	**A**	-
DNQ	C2	105	(Italy) Kelmar Racing	(Italy) Pasquale Barberio (Italy) Maurizio Gellini	Ford Cosworth DFL 3.3L V8	**A**	-

== Statistics ==
- Pole Position - #17 Brun Motorsport - 2:06.870
- Fastest Lap - #51 Silk Cut Jaguar - 2:09.380
- Average Speed - 179.978 km/h

World Sportscar Championship
Previous race: 1986 1000 km of Nürburgring	1986 season	Next race: 1986 1000 km of Fuji
