= 1986 1000 km of Nürburgring =

Sports car endurance race in Germany

Nürburgring (1984–1994)

The 1986 ADAC Kouros 1000 km Nürburgring was the seventh round of the 1986 World Sports-Prototype Championship. It took place at the Nürburgring, West Germany on August 24, 1986.

== Report ==
=== Entry ===
For this round, a total of 41 entered for the race, however only 34 of these arrived in the Eifel mountains for the practice and qualifying.

=== Qualifying ===
Thierry Boutsen took pole position for Brun Motorsport, in their Porsche 956 he shared with the team's owner, Walter Brun, averaging a speed of 117.102 mph.

=== Race ===
Low clouds and rain fell on the circuit throughout the beginning of the race, causing a multitude of accidents and spins. Although the Sauber C8 generally lacked effective ground effects, it was reliable but off the pace of the Porsches and Jaguars, but the poor weather allowed Mike Thackwell to drive brilliantly on his Goodyear rain tyres to pass Hans-Joachim Stuck in the works Porsche 962C, leading the race on merit. However, a collision between the Argo-Zakspeed of Martin Schanche and the Tiga-Ford of Roy Baker, required the deployment of the safety car on Lap 22. As the safety car was deployed however, low visibility and confusion over the state of the caution led to the two works Rothmans Porsches of Stuck and Jochen Mass colliding on the front stretch, heavily damaging both cars. Due to the amount of debris littering the track, the event was stopped for two hours.

Believing the track to be unsafe in the continuing wet conditions, three Porsche teams chose to withdraw from the event. These included the three Brun cars, as well as the Joest and Kremer cars. The race was restarted behind the pace car, but timing was on aggregate.

At the restart, Thackwell kept control of the race, and although Derek Warwick’s Jaguar passed him as the circuit dried out, the British car later retired with a broken oil line. The remaining Porsche teams were unable to keep up with the Sauber or Jaguar. There was nothing, then to Henri Pescarolo from completing the shortened race distance giving Sauber its first-ever World Championship success. It also marked the first victory by a Mercedes-Benz in the World Championship since the 1955 24 Hours of Le Mans.

The Sauber triumphed in a time of 3hr 42:30.020, averaging a speed of 92.626mph. Second place went to the Liqui Moly Equipe pairing of Klaus Niedzwiedz and Mauro Baldi aboard the Porsche 956 GTi, who was two laps adrift. The podium was completed by the Spanish partnership of Emilio de Villota and Fermín Vélez in their John Fitzpatrick Racing prepared Porsche 956.

== Classification ==
=== Official results ===
Please note that the result was declared after 121 laps (598.6 km), instead of the full race distance. Class winners in bold. Cars failing to complete 75% of the winner's distance marked as Not Classified (NC).

Pos	Class	No	Team	Drivers	Chassis	Tyre	Laps
Pos	Class	No	Team	Drivers	Engine	Tyre	Laps
1	**C1**	**61**	**(Switzerland) Kouros Racing Team**	**(France) Henri Pescarolo (New Zealand) Mike Thackwell**	**Sauber C8**	**G**	**121**
1	**C1**	**61**	**(Switzerland) Kouros Racing Team**	**(France) Henri Pescarolo (New Zealand) Mike Thackwell**	**Mercedes-Benz M117 5.0 L Turbo V8**	**G**	**121**
2	C1	14	(United Kingdom) Liqui Moly Equipe	(West Germany) Klaus Niedzwiedz (Italy) Mauro Baldi	Porsche 956 GTi	**G**	119
2	C1	14	(United Kingdom) Liqui Moly Equipe	(West Germany) Klaus Niedzwiedz (Italy) Mauro Baldi	Porsche Type-935 2.8 L Turbo Flat-6	**G**	119
3	C1	33	(Spain) Danone Porsche España (United Kingdom) John Fitzpatrick Racing	(Spain) Emilio de Villota (Spain) Fermín Vélez	Porsche 956B	**G**	119
3	C1	33	(Spain) Danone Porsche España (United Kingdom) John Fitzpatrick Racing	(Spain) Emilio de Villota (Spain) Fermín Vélez	Porsche Type-935 2.6 L Turbo Flat-6	**G**	119
4	C1	9	(West Germany) Obermaier Racing Team	(West Germany) Jürgen Lässig (Italy) Fulvio Ballabio (West Germany) Harald Grohs	Porsche 956	**G**	115
4	C1	9	(West Germany) Obermaier Racing Team	(West Germany) Jürgen Lässig (Italy) Fulvio Ballabio (West Germany) Harald Grohs	Porsche Type-935 2.6 L Turbo Flat-6	**G**	115
5	**C2**	**79**	**(United Kingdom) Ecurie Ecosse**	**(United Kingdom) Ray Mallock (Belgium) Marc Duez**	**Ecosse C286**	**A**	**115**
5	**C2**	**79**	**(United Kingdom) Ecurie Ecosse**	**(United Kingdom) Ray Mallock (Belgium) Marc Duez**	**Rover V64V 3.0 L V6**	**A**	**115**
6	C2	74	(West Germany) Gebhardt Motorsport	(Austria) Walter Lechner (Austria) Ernst Franzmaier	Gebhardt JC853	**A**	112
6	C2	74	(West Germany) Gebhardt Motorsport	(Austria) Walter Lechner (Austria) Ernst Franzmaier	Ford Cosworth DFL 3.3 L V8	**A**	112
7	C2	70	(United Kingdom) Spice Engineering	(United Kingdom) Gordon Spice (United Kingdom) Ray Bellm	Spice SE86C	**A**	110
7	C2	70	(United Kingdom) Spice Engineering	(United Kingdom) Gordon Spice (United Kingdom) Ray Bellm	Ford Cosworth DFL 3.3 L V8	**A**	110
8	C2	75	(United Kingdom) ADA Engineering	(United Kingdom) Evan Clements (United Kingdom) Ian Harrower	Gebhardt JC843	**A**	107
8	C2	75	(United Kingdom) ADA Engineering	(United Kingdom) Evan Clements (United Kingdom) Ian Harrower	Ford Cosworth DFL 3.3 L V8	**A**	107
9	C2	90	Jens Winther Denmark	(Denmark) Jens Winther (Switzerland) Angelo Pallavicini	URD C83	**A**	107
9	C2	90	Jens Winther Denmark	(Denmark) Jens Winther (Switzerland) Angelo Pallavicini	BMW M88 3.5 L I6	**A**	107
10	C1	66	(United Kingdom) Cosmic Racing	(Greece) Costas Los (West Germany) Volker Weidler	March 84G	**A**	106
10	C1	66	(United Kingdom) Cosmic Racing	(Greece) Costas Los (West Germany) Volker Weidler	Porsche Type-935 2.6 L Turbo Flat-6	**A**	106
11	C1	20	(United Kingdom) Tiga Team	(United Kingdom) Tim Lee-Davey (Australia) Neil Crang	Tiga GC86	**D**	105
11	C1	20	(United Kingdom) Tiga Team	(United Kingdom) Tim Lee-Davey (Australia) Neil Crang	Ford Cosworth DFL 3.3 L Turbo V8	**D**	105
12	C2	95	(France) Roland Bassaler	(France) Dominique Lacaud (France) Roland Bassaler	Sauber SHS C6	**A**	101
12	C2	95	(France) Roland Bassaler	(France) Dominique Lacaud (France) Roland Bassaler	BMW M88 3.5 L I6	**A**	101
13	C2	99	(United Kingdom) Roy Baker Promotions	(United Kingdom) Duncan Bain (Denmark) Thorkild Thyrring	Tiga GC286	**A**	99
13	C2	99	(United Kingdom) Roy Baker Promotions	(United Kingdom) Duncan Bain (Denmark) Thorkild Thyrring	Ford Cosworth BDT 1.7 L Turbo I4	**A**	99
14	C2	92	(France) Automobiles Louis Descartes	(France) Louis Descartes (France) Jacques Heuclin (France) Hubert Striebig	ALD 02	**A**	98
14	C2	92	(France) Automobiles Louis Descartes	(France) Louis Descartes (France) Jacques Heuclin (France) Hubert Striebig	BMW M88 3.5 L I6	**A**	98
15 DNF	C1	53	(United Kingdom) Silk Cut Jaguar	(Netherlands) Jan Lammers (United Kingdom) Derek Warwick (Italy) Gianfranco Brancatelli	Jaguar XJR-6	**D**	92
15 DNF	C1	53	(United Kingdom) Silk Cut Jaguar	(Netherlands) Jan Lammers (United Kingdom) Derek Warwick (Italy) Gianfranco Brancatelli	Jaguar 6.5 L V12	**D**	92
16 DNF	B	151	(West Germany) MK Motorsport	(West Germany) Helmut Gall (West Germany) Harald Becker (West Germany) Michael Krankenberg	BMW M1	**D**	68
16 DNF	B	151	(West Germany) MK Motorsport	(West Germany) Helmut Gall (West Germany) Harald Becker (West Germany) Michael Krankenberg	BMW M88 3.5 L I6	**D**	68
17 DNF	C2	72	(United Kingdom) John Bartlett Racing with Goodman Sound	(United Kingdom) David Mercer (Sweden) Kenneth Leim	Bardon DB1	?	60
17 DNF	C2	72	(United Kingdom) John Bartlett Racing with Goodman Sound	(United Kingdom) David Mercer (Sweden) Kenneth Leim	Ford Cosworth DFL 3.3 L V8	?	60
18 DNF	C2	105	(Italy) Kelmar Racing	(Italy) Pasquale Barberio (Italy) Maurizio Gellini	Tiga GC85	**A**	59
18 DNF	C2	105	(Italy) Kelmar Racing	(Italy) Pasquale Barberio (Italy) Maurizio Gellini	Ford Cosworth DFL 3.3 L V8	**A**	59
19 DNF	C1	1	(West Germany) Rothmans Porsche	(West Germany) Hans-Joachim Stuck (United Kingdom) Derek Bell	Porsche 962C	**D**	22
19 DNF	C1	1	(West Germany) Rothmans Porsche	(West Germany) Hans-Joachim Stuck (United Kingdom) Derek Bell	Porsche Type-935 3.0 L Turbo Flat-6	**D**	22
20 DNF	C1	7	(West Germany) Joest Racing	(West Germany) "John Winter" (Denmark) Kris Nissen (Italy) Piercarlo Ghinzani	Porsche 956B	**G**	22
20 DNF	C1	7	(West Germany) Joest Racing	(West Germany) "John Winter" (Denmark) Kris Nissen (Italy) Piercarlo Ghinzani	Porsche Type-935 2.8 L Turbo Flat-6	**G**	22
21 DNF	C1	17	(Switzerland) Brun Motorsport	(Belgium) Thierry Boutsen (Switzerland) Walter Brun	Porsche 962C	**MI**	22
21 DNF	C1	17	(Switzerland) Brun Motorsport	(Belgium) Thierry Boutsen (Switzerland) Walter Brun	Porsche Type-935 2.8 L Turbo Flat-6	**MI**	22
22 DNF	C1	2	(West Germany) Rothmans Porsche	(West Germany) Jochen Mass (France) Bob Wollek	Porsche 962C	**D**	21
22 DNF	C1	2	(West Germany) Rothmans Porsche	(West Germany) Jochen Mass (France) Bob Wollek	Porsche Type-935 3.0 L Turbo Flat-6	**D**	21
23 DNF	C1	10	(West Germany) Porsche Kremer Racing	(Italy) Alessandro Nannini (United Kingdom) James Weaver	Porsche 962C	**Y**	21
23 DNF	C1	10	(West Germany) Porsche Kremer Racing	(Italy) Alessandro Nannini (United Kingdom) James Weaver	Porsche Type-935 2.8 L Turbo Flat-6	**Y**	21
24 DNF	C1	18	(Switzerland) Brun Motorsport	(Argentina) Oscar Larrauri (Spain) Jesús Pareja	Porsche 962C	**MI**	21
24 DNF	C1	18	(Switzerland) Brun Motorsport	(Argentina) Oscar Larrauri (Spain) Jesús Pareja	Porsche Type-935 2.8 L Turbo Flat-6	**MI**	21
25 DNF	C1	19	(Switzerland) Brun Motorsport	(Sweden) Stanley Dickens (West Germany) Frank Jelinski	Porsche 956	**MI**	21
25 DNF	C1	19	(Switzerland) Brun Motorsport	(Sweden) Stanley Dickens (West Germany) Frank Jelinski	Porsche Type-935 2.8 L Turbo Flat-6	**MI**	21
26 DNF	C2	89	(Norway) Martin Schanche Racing	(Norway) Martin Schanche (Norway) Torgye Kleppe (Austria) "Pierre Chauvet"	Argo JM19	**G**	19
26 DNF	C2	89	(Norway) Martin Schanche Racing	(Norway) Martin Schanche (Norway) Torgye Kleppe (Austria) "Pierre Chauvet"	Zakspeed 1.9 L Turbo I4	**G**	19
27 DNF	C2	98	(United Kingdom) Roy Baker Promotions	(Morocco) Max Cohen-Olivar (United Kingdom) David Andrews	Tiga GC286	**A**	16
27 DNF	C2	98	(United Kingdom) Roy Baker Promotions	(Morocco) Max Cohen-Olivar (United Kingdom) David Andrews	Ford Cosworth BDT 1.7 L Turbo I4	**A**	16
28 DNF	GTP	21	(United Kingdom) Richard Cleare Racing	(United Kingdom) Richard Cleare (United Kingdom) David Leslie	March 85G	**G**	11
28 DNF	GTP	21	(United Kingdom) Richard Cleare Racing	(United Kingdom) Richard Cleare (United Kingdom) David Leslie	Porsche Type-962 3.2 L Turbo Flat-6	**G**	11
29 DNF	C2	104	(France) Jean-Claude Ferrarin	(France) Jean-Claude Ferrarin (France) Philippe Mazué	Isolia 001	?	9
29 DNF	C2	104	(France) Jean-Claude Ferrarin	(France) Jean-Claude Ferrarin (France) Philippe Mazué	Ford Cosworth DFV 3.0 L V8	?	9
30 DNF	C1	51	(United Kingdom) Silk Cut Jaguar	(France) Jean-Louis Schlesser (United States) Eddie Cheever (West Germany) Hans Heyer	Jaguar XJR-6	**D**	6
30 DNF	C1	51	(United Kingdom) Silk Cut Jaguar	(France) Jean-Louis Schlesser (United States) Eddie Cheever (West Germany) Hans Heyer	Jaguar 6.5 L V12	**D**	6
31 DNF	C1	63	(West Germany) Ernst Schuster	(West Germany) Ernst Schuster (West Germany) Rudi Seher (West Germany) Siegfried Brunn	Porsche 936C	**D**	4
31 DNF	C1	63	(West Germany) Ernst Schuster	(West Germany) Ernst Schuster (West Germany) Rudi Seher (West Germany) Siegfried Brunn	Porsche Type-962 2.8 L Turbo Flat-6	**D**	4
DNS	C1	52	(United Kingdom) Silk Cut Jaguar	(Netherlands) Jan Lammers (United Kingdom) Derek Warwick	Jaguar XJR-6	**D**	-
DNS	C1	52	(United Kingdom) Silk Cut Jaguar	(Netherlands) Jan Lammers (United Kingdom) Derek Warwick	Jaguar 6.5 L V12	**D**	-
DNS	GTP	174	(West Germany) Erwin Derichs	(West Germany) Martin Wegenstetter (West Germany) Kurt Hild	Derichs TCS	?	-
DNS	GTP	174	(West Germany) Erwin Derichs	(West Germany) Martin Wegenstetter (West Germany) Kurt Hild	Ford Cosworth DFV 3.0 L V8	?	-

- Fastest Lap: Klaus Niedzwiedz, 1:34.820secs (107.778 mph)

World Sportscar Championship
Previous race: 1986 360 km of Jerez	1986 season	Next race: 1986 1000 km of Spa
