= 1986 World Sports Prototype Championship =

Racing tournament

1986 World Sportscar Championship

Seasons
- ← 1985 1987 →

The 1986 World Sports-Prototype Championship season was the 34th season of FIA "World Sportscar Championship" motor racing. It featured the 1986 FIA World Sports Prototype Championship which was contested over a nine race series that ran from 20 April to 5 October 1986. The championship was open to Group C Sports Prototypes, Group C2 Sports Prototypes and IMSA GTP cars. The Drivers Championship was won by Derek Bell and the Teams Championship by Brun Motorsport.

236 drivers started in at least 1 (one) Grand Prix in the 1987 FIA World Sports Prototype Championship.

== Schedule ==
The 1986 FIA World Sports Prototype Championship was contested over a nine race series.

Rnd	Race	Circuit	Date
1	(Italy) Coppa Kouros (360km)^{†}	Autodromo Nazionale Monza	20 April
2	(United Kingdom) Kouros' 1000 km Silverstone	Silverstone Circuit	4 May
3	(France) 24 Hours of Le Mans	Circuit de la Sarthe	31 May; 1 June
4	(Germany) 100 Meilen von Nürnberg^{†}	Norisring	29 June
5	(United Kingdom) Shell Gemini 1000 km Brands Hatch^{†}	Brands Hatch	20 July
6	(Spain) Trofeo Silk Cut (360 km)^{†}	Circuito Permanente de Jerez	3 August
7	(Germany) ADAC Kouros 1000km Nürburgring	Nürburgring	24 August
8	(Belgium) Kouros 1000km Spa	Circuit de Spa-Francorchamps	14 September
9	(Japan) Mount Fuji 1000 Kilometres	Fuji Speedway	5 October

† - Race counted for Drivers Championship but not for Teams Championship.

== Entries ==
=== Group C1 ===
Entrant	Car	Engine	Tyre	No.	Drivers	Rounds
(West Germany) Rothmans Porsche	Porsche 962C	Porsche Type-935/76 2.6 L Turbo Flat-6; Porsche Type-935/82 3.0 L Turbo Flat-6	D	1	(West Germany) Hans-Joachim Stuck	1–4, 7–9
(West Germany) Rothmans Porsche	Porsche 962C	Porsche Type-935/76 2.6 L Turbo Flat-6; Porsche Type-935/82 3.0 L Turbo Flat-6	D	1	(United Kingdom) Derek Bell	1–3, 7–9
(West Germany) Rothmans Porsche	Porsche 962C	Porsche Type-935/76 2.6 L Turbo Flat-6; Porsche Type-935/82 3.0 L Turbo Flat-6	D	1	(United States) Al Holbert	3
(West Germany) Rothmans Porsche	Porsche 962C	Porsche Type-935/76 2.6 L Turbo Flat-6; Porsche Type-935/82 3.0 L Turbo Flat-6	D	2	(West Germany) Jochen Mass	1–3, 7–8
(West Germany) Rothmans Porsche	Porsche 962C	Porsche Type-935/76 2.6 L Turbo Flat-6; Porsche Type-935/82 3.0 L Turbo Flat-6	D	2	(France) Bob Wollek	1–3, 7–8
(West Germany) Rothmans Porsche	Porsche 962C	Porsche Type-935/76 2.6 L Turbo Flat-6; Porsche Type-935/82 3.0 L Turbo Flat-6	D	2	(Australia) Vern Schuppan	3
(West Germany) Rothmans Porsche	Porsche 962C	Porsche Type-935/76 2.6 L Turbo Flat-6; Porsche Type-935/82 3.0 L Turbo Flat-6	D	2	(France) Henri Pescarolo	9
(West Germany) Rothmans Porsche	Porsche 962C	Porsche Type-935/76 2.6 L Turbo Flat-6; Porsche Type-935/82 3.0 L Turbo Flat-6	D	2	(United States) Al Holbert	9
(West Germany) Rothmans Porsche	Porsche 962C	Porsche Type-935/76 2.6 L Turbo Flat-6; Porsche Type-935/82 3.0 L Turbo Flat-6	D	3	(Australia) Vern Schuppan	3
(West Germany) Rothmans Porsche	Porsche 962C	Porsche Type-935/76 2.6 L Turbo Flat-6; Porsche Type-935/82 3.0 L Turbo Flat-6	D	3	(United States) Drake Olson	3
(Italy) Martini Racing	Lancia LC2/85	Ferrari 308C 3.0 L Turbo V8	M	4	(Italy) Andrea de Cesaris	1–2
(Italy) Martini Racing	Lancia LC2/85	Ferrari 308C 3.0 L Turbo V8	M	4	(Italy) Alessandro Nannini	1–2
(Italy) Sponsor Geest Team	Lancia LC2/85	Ferrari 308C 3.0 L Turbo V8	D	6	(Italy) Bruno Giacomelli	4–5
(Italy) Sponsor Geest Team	Lancia LC2/85	Ferrari 308C 3.0 L Turbo V8	D	6	(Italy) Andrea de Cesaris	5
(West Germany) Joest Racing (West Germany) Blaupunkt Joest Racing	Porsche 956B	Porsche Type-935/76 2.6 L Turbo Flat-6	G	7	(Italy) Paolo Barilla	1–3, 8–9
(West Germany) Joest Racing (West Germany) Blaupunkt Joest Racing	Porsche 956B	Porsche Type-935/76 2.6 L Turbo Flat-6	G	7	(West Germany) Klaus Ludwig	1, 3–5, 8
(West Germany) Joest Racing (West Germany) Blaupunkt Joest Racing	Porsche 956B	Porsche Type-935/76 2.6 L Turbo Flat-6	G	7	(United States) John Morton	2
(West Germany) Joest Racing (West Germany) Blaupunkt Joest Racing	Porsche 956B	Porsche Type-935/76 2.6 L Turbo Flat-6	G	7	(United States) George Follmer	2
(West Germany) Joest Racing (West Germany) Blaupunkt Joest Racing	Porsche 956B	Porsche Type-935/76 2.6 L Turbo Flat-6	G	7	(West Germany) "John Winter"	3, 7
(West Germany) Joest Racing (West Germany) Blaupunkt Joest Racing	Porsche 956B	Porsche Type-935/76 2.6 L Turbo Flat-6	G	7	(West Germany) Hans-Joachim Stuck	5
(West Germany) Joest Racing (West Germany) Blaupunkt Joest Racing	Porsche 956B	Porsche Type-935/76 2.6 L Turbo Flat-6	G	7	(United Kingdom) Derek Bell	5
(West Germany) Joest Racing (West Germany) Blaupunkt Joest Racing	Porsche 956B	Porsche Type-935/76 2.6 L Turbo Flat-6	G	7	(Italy) Piercarlo Ghinzani	7, 9
(West Germany) Joest Racing (West Germany) Blaupunkt Joest Racing	Porsche 956B	Porsche Type-935/76 2.6 L Turbo Flat-6	G	7	(Denmark) Kris Nissen	7
(West Germany) Joest Racing (West Germany) Blaupunkt Joest Racing	Porsche 956B	Porsche Type-935/76 2.6 L Turbo Flat-6	G	8	(West Germany) "John Winter"	1, 4–5, 8–9
(West Germany) Joest Racing (West Germany) Blaupunkt Joest Racing	Porsche 956B	Porsche Type-935/76 2.6 L Turbo Flat-6	G	8	(Belgium) Marc Duez	1
(West Germany) Joest Racing (West Germany) Blaupunkt Joest Racing	Porsche 956B	Porsche Type-935/76 2.6 L Turbo Flat-6	G	8	(United States) John Morton	3
(West Germany) Joest Racing (West Germany) Blaupunkt Joest Racing	Porsche 956B	Porsche Type-935/76 2.6 L Turbo Flat-6	G	8	(United States) George Follmer	3
(West Germany) Joest Racing (West Germany) Blaupunkt Joest Racing	Porsche 956B	Porsche Type-935/76 2.6 L Turbo Flat-6	G	8	(United States) Kenper Miller	3
(West Germany) Joest Racing (West Germany) Blaupunkt Joest Racing	Porsche 956B	Porsche Type-935/76 2.6 L Turbo Flat-6	G	8	(West Germany) Klaus Ludwig	5
(West Germany) Joest Racing (West Germany) Blaupunkt Joest Racing	Porsche 956B	Porsche Type-935/76 2.6 L Turbo Flat-6	G	8	(Italy) Paolo Barilla	5
(West Germany) Joest Racing (West Germany) Blaupunkt Joest Racing	Porsche 956B	Porsche Type-935/76 2.6 L Turbo Flat-6	G	8	(Denmark) Kris Nissen	8–9
(West Germany) Joest Racing (West Germany) Blaupunkt Joest Racing	Porsche 956B	Porsche Type-935/76 2.6 L Turbo Flat-6	G	8	(Australia) Vern Schuppan	8
(West Germany) Joest Racing (West Germany) Blaupunkt Joest Racing	Porsche 956B	Porsche Type-935/76 2.6 L Turbo Flat-6	G	8	(West Germany) Harald Grohs	9
(West Germany) Obermaier Racing	Porsche 956	Porsche Type-935/76 2.6 L Turbo Flat-6	G	9	(Italy) Fulvio Ballabio	1–3, 5–7
(West Germany) Obermaier Racing	Porsche 956	Porsche Type-935/76 2.6 L Turbo Flat-6	G	9	(West Germany) Richard Hamann	1
(West Germany) Obermaier Racing	Porsche 956	Porsche Type-935/76 2.6 L Turbo Flat-6	G	9	(West Germany) Jürgen Lässig	2–8
(West Germany) Obermaier Racing	Porsche 956	Porsche Type-935/76 2.6 L Turbo Flat-6	G	9	(United Kingdom) Dudley Wood	2–3, 5–6, 8
(West Germany) Obermaier Racing	Porsche 956	Porsche Type-935/76 2.6 L Turbo Flat-6	G	9	(West Germany) Harald Grohs	7
(West Germany) Obermaier Racing	Porsche 956	Porsche Type-935/76 2.6 L Turbo Flat-6	G	9	(Belgium) Hervé Regout	8
(West Germany) Porsche Kremer Racing	Porsche 962C	Porsche Type-935/76 2.6 L Turbo Flat-6; Porsche Type-935/79 2.8 L Turbo Flat-6	Y	10	(Austria) Jo Gartner	1–3
(West Germany) Porsche Kremer Racing	Porsche 962C	Porsche Type-935/76 2.6 L Turbo Flat-6; Porsche Type-935/79 2.8 L Turbo Flat-6	Y	10	(West Germany) Klaus Niedzwiedz	1
(West Germany) Porsche Kremer Racing	Porsche 962C	Porsche Type-935/76 2.6 L Turbo Flat-6; Porsche Type-935/79 2.8 L Turbo Flat-6	Y	10	(United Kingdom) Tiff Needell	2
(West Germany) Porsche Kremer Racing	Porsche 962C	Porsche Type-935/76 2.6 L Turbo Flat-6; Porsche Type-935/79 2.8 L Turbo Flat-6	Y	10	(South Africa) Sarel van der Merwe	3
(West Germany) Porsche Kremer Racing	Porsche 962C	Porsche Type-935/76 2.6 L Turbo Flat-6; Porsche Type-935/79 2.8 L Turbo Flat-6	Y	10	(Japan) Kunimitsu Takahashi	3
(West Germany) Porsche Kremer Racing	Porsche 962C	Porsche Type-935/76 2.6 L Turbo Flat-6; Porsche Type-935/79 2.8 L Turbo Flat-6	Y	10	(United Kingdom) James Weaver	4, 7
(West Germany) Porsche Kremer Racing	Porsche 962C	Porsche Type-935/76 2.6 L Turbo Flat-6; Porsche Type-935/79 2.8 L Turbo Flat-6	Y	10	(Italy) Alessandro Nannini	7
(West Germany) Porsche Kremer Racing	Porsche 962C	Porsche Type-935/76 2.6 L Turbo Flat-6; Porsche Type-935/79 2.8 L Turbo Flat-6	Y	10	(West Germany) Volker Weidler	8–9
(West Germany) Porsche Kremer Racing	Porsche 962C	Porsche Type-935/76 2.6 L Turbo Flat-6; Porsche Type-935/79 2.8 L Turbo Flat-6	Y	10	(Italy) Bruno Giacomelli	8–9
(West Germany) Porsche Kremer Racing	Porsche 956	Porsche Type-935/76 2.6 L Turbo Flat-6; Porsche Type-935/79 2.8 L Turbo Flat-6	Y	11	(Austria) Franz Konrad	4
(West Germany) Porsche Kremer Racing	Porsche 962C	Porsche Type-935/76 2.6 L Turbo Flat-6; Porsche Type-935/79 2.8 L Turbo Flat-6	Y	12	(France) Pierre Yver	3
(West Germany) Porsche Kremer Racing	Porsche 962C	Porsche Type-935/76 2.6 L Turbo Flat-6; Porsche Type-935/79 2.8 L Turbo Flat-6	Y	12	(Morocco) Max Cohen-Olivar	3
(West Germany) Porsche Kremer Racing	Porsche 962C	Porsche Type-935/76 2.6 L Turbo Flat-6; Porsche Type-935/79 2.8 L Turbo Flat-6	Y	12	(France) Hubert Striebig	3
(France) Primagaz	Cougar C12	Porsche Type-935/76 2.6 L Turbo Flat-6	M	13	(France) Yves Courage	2–3
(France) Primagaz	Cougar C12	Porsche Type-935/76 2.6 L Turbo Flat-6	M	13	(France) Pierre-François Rousselot	2
(France) Primagaz	Cougar C12	Porsche Type-935/76 2.6 L Turbo Flat-6	M	13	(France) Pierre-Henri Raphanel	3
(France) Primagaz	Cougar C12	Porsche Type-935/76 2.6 L Turbo Flat-6	M	13	(United Kingdom) Alain de Cadenet	3
(United Kingdom) Liqui Moly Equipe	Porsche 956	Porsche Type-935/76 2.6 L Turbo Flat-6; Porsche Type-935/79 2.8 L Turbo Flat-6	G	14	(United Kingdom) James Weaver	2, 8
(United Kingdom) Liqui Moly Equipe	Porsche 956	Porsche Type-935/76 2.6 L Turbo Flat-6; Porsche Type-935/79 2.8 L Turbo Flat-6	G	14	(West Germany) Klaus Niedzwiedz	2, 7, 9
(United Kingdom) Liqui Moly Equipe	Porsche 956	Porsche Type-935/76 2.6 L Turbo Flat-6; Porsche Type-935/79 2.8 L Turbo Flat-6	G	14	(Italy) Mauro Baldi	3, 5, 7–9
(United Kingdom) Liqui Moly Equipe	Porsche 956	Porsche Type-935/76 2.6 L Turbo Flat-6; Porsche Type-935/79 2.8 L Turbo Flat-6	G	14	(United States) Price Cobb	3
(United Kingdom) Liqui Moly Equipe	Porsche 956	Porsche Type-935/76 2.6 L Turbo Flat-6; Porsche Type-935/79 2.8 L Turbo Flat-6	G	14	(United States) Rob Dyson	3
(United Kingdom) Liqui Moly Equipe	Porsche 956	Porsche Type-935/76 2.6 L Turbo Flat-6; Porsche Type-935/79 2.8 L Turbo Flat-6	G	14	(France) Bob Wollek	4–5
(Japan) Person's Racing Team	Nissan R86V	Nissan VG30ET 3.0 L Turbo V6	B	15	(Japan) Aguri Suzuki	9
(Japan) Person's Racing Team	Nissan R86V	Nissan VG30ET 3.0 L Turbo V6	B	15	(Japan) Keiji Matsumoto	9
(Switzerland) Brun Motorsport	Porsche 962C	Porsche Type-935/76 2.6 L Turbo Flat-6; Porsche Type-935/79 2.8 L Turbo Flat-6	M	17	(Belgium) Thierry Boutsen	1–2, 7–8
(Switzerland) Brun Motorsport	Porsche 962C	Porsche Type-935/76 2.6 L Turbo Flat-6; Porsche Type-935/79 2.8 L Turbo Flat-6	M	17	(United States) Drake Olson	1
(Switzerland) Brun Motorsport	Porsche 962C	Porsche Type-935/76 2.6 L Turbo Flat-6; Porsche Type-935/79 2.8 L Turbo Flat-6	M	17	(Italy) Massimo Sigala	2, 5
(Switzerland) Brun Motorsport	Porsche 962C	Porsche Type-935/76 2.6 L Turbo Flat-6; Porsche Type-935/79 2.8 L Turbo Flat-6	M	17	(Argentina) Oscar Larrauri	3
(Switzerland) Brun Motorsport	Porsche 962C	Porsche Type-935/76 2.6 L Turbo Flat-6; Porsche Type-935/79 2.8 L Turbo Flat-6	M	17	(Spain) Jésus Pareja	3
(Switzerland) Brun Motorsport	Porsche 962C	Porsche Type-935/76 2.6 L Turbo Flat-6; Porsche Type-935/79 2.8 L Turbo Flat-6	M	17	(France) Joël Gouhier	3
(Switzerland) Brun Motorsport	Porsche 962C	Porsche Type-935/76 2.6 L Turbo Flat-6; Porsche Type-935/79 2.8 L Turbo Flat-6	M	17	(Switzerland) Walter Brun	4–7
(Switzerland) Brun Motorsport	Porsche 962C	Porsche Type-935/76 2.6 L Turbo Flat-6; Porsche Type-935/79 2.8 L Turbo Flat-6	M	17	(West Germany) Frank Jelinski	6, 8
(Switzerland) Brun Motorsport	Porsche 962C	Porsche Type-935/76 2.6 L Turbo Flat-6; Porsche Type-935/79 2.8 L Turbo Flat-6	M	18	(Argentina) Oscar Larrauri	1–2, 5–9
(Switzerland) Brun Motorsport	Porsche 962C	Porsche Type-935/76 2.6 L Turbo Flat-6; Porsche Type-935/79 2.8 L Turbo Flat-6	M	18	(Spain) Jésus Pareja	1–2, 5–9
(Switzerland) Brun Motorsport	Porsche 962C	Porsche Type-935/76 2.6 L Turbo Flat-6; Porsche Type-935/79 2.8 L Turbo Flat-6	M	18	(Italy) Massimo Sigala	3
(Switzerland) Brun Motorsport	Porsche 962C	Porsche Type-935/76 2.6 L Turbo Flat-6; Porsche Type-935/79 2.8 L Turbo Flat-6	M	18	(Switzerland) Walter Brun	3
(Switzerland) Brun Motorsport	Porsche 962C	Porsche Type-935/76 2.6 L Turbo Flat-6; Porsche Type-935/79 2.8 L Turbo Flat-6	M	18	(West Germany) Frank Jelinski	3
(Switzerland) Brun Motorsport	Porsche 962C	Porsche Type-935/76 2.6 L Turbo Flat-6; Porsche Type-935/79 2.8 L Turbo Flat-6	M	18	(Belgium) Thierry Boutsen	4
(Switzerland) Brun Motorsport	Porsche 956	Porsche Type-935/76 2.6 L Turbo Flat-6; Porsche Type-935/79 2.8 L Turbo Flat-6	M	19	(Switzerland) Walter Brun	1–2, 8
(Switzerland) Brun Motorsport	Porsche 956	Porsche Type-935/76 2.6 L Turbo Flat-6; Porsche Type-935/79 2.8 L Turbo Flat-6	M	19	(Italy) Massimo Sigala	1, 8
(Switzerland) Brun Motorsport	Porsche 956	Porsche Type-935/76 2.6 L Turbo Flat-6; Porsche Type-935/79 2.8 L Turbo Flat-6	M	19	(West Germany) Frank Jelinski	2, 5, 7, 9
(Switzerland) Brun Motorsport	Porsche 956	Porsche Type-935/76 2.6 L Turbo Flat-6; Porsche Type-935/79 2.8 L Turbo Flat-6	M	19	(Belgium) Thierry Boutsen	3, 5
(Switzerland) Brun Motorsport	Porsche 956	Porsche Type-935/76 2.6 L Turbo Flat-6; Porsche Type-935/79 2.8 L Turbo Flat-6	M	19	(Belgium) Didier Theys	3, 8
(Switzerland) Brun Motorsport	Porsche 956	Porsche Type-935/76 2.6 L Turbo Flat-6; Porsche Type-935/79 2.8 L Turbo Flat-6	M	19	(France) Alain Ferté	3
(Switzerland) Brun Motorsport	Porsche 956	Porsche Type-935/76 2.6 L Turbo Flat-6; Porsche Type-935/79 2.8 L Turbo Flat-6	M	19	(Sweden) Stanley Dickens	7, 9
(Switzerland) Team Memorex	Porsche 962C	Porsche Type-935/76 2.6 L Turbo Flat-6; Porsche Type-935/79 2.8 L Turbo Flat-6	M	38	(West Germany) Frank Jelinski	4
(United Kingdom) Tiga Team	Tiga GC86	Ford Cosworth DFL 3.3 L Turbo V8	D	20	(United Kingdom) Tim Lee-Davey	3, 5, 7–9
(United Kingdom) Tiga Team	Tiga GC86	Ford Cosworth DFL 3.3 L Turbo V8	D	20	(Australia) Neil Crang	3, 5, 7–8
(United Kingdom) Tiga Team	Tiga GC86	Ford Cosworth DFL 3.3 L Turbo V8	D	20	(United States) John Gimbel	3
(United Kingdom) Tiga Team	Tiga GC86	Ford Cosworth DFL 3.3 L Turbo V8	D	20	(United Kingdom) Richard Piper	9
(Japan) Nissan Motorsport (Japan) Hoshino Racing	Nissan R86V	Nissan VG30ET 3.0 L Turbo V6	B	23	(Japan) Kazuyoshi Hoshino	3, 9
(Japan) Nissan Motorsport (Japan) Hoshino Racing	Nissan R86V	Nissan VG30ET 3.0 L Turbo V6	B	23	(Japan) Aguri Suzuki	3
(Japan) Nissan Motorsport (Japan) Hoshino Racing	Nissan R86V	Nissan VG30ET 3.0 L Turbo V6	B	23	(Japan) Keiji Matsumoto	3
(Japan) Nissan Motorsport (Japan) Hoshino Racing	Nissan R86V	Nissan VG30ET 3.0 L Turbo V6	B	23	(Japan) Osamu Nakako	9
(Japan) Nissan Motorsport	Nissan R85V; Nissan R86V	Nissan VG30ET 3.0 L Turbo V6	D	32	(Japan) Masahiro Hasemi	3, 9
(Japan) Nissan Motorsport	Nissan R85V; Nissan R86V	Nissan VG30ET 3.0 L Turbo V6	D	32	(Japan) Takao Wada	3, 9
(Japan) Nissan Motorsport	Nissan R85V; Nissan R86V	Nissan VG30ET 3.0 L Turbo V6	D	32	(Japan) Aguri Suzuki	3
(Japan) Nissan Motorsport	Nissan R85V; Nissan R86V	Nissan VG30ET 3.0 L Turbo V6	D	32	(United Kingdom) James Weaver	3
(Japan) Central 20 Racing Team	March 85G	Nissan LZ20B 2.1 L Turbo I4	D	24	(Japan) Haruhito Yanagida	9
(Japan) Central 20 Racing Team	March 85G	Nissan LZ20B 2.1 L Turbo I4	D	24	(Japan) Takamasa Nakagawa	9
(Japan) Central 20 Racing Team	March 85G	Nissan LZ20B 2.1 L Turbo I4	D	24	(Japan) Keiji Matsumoto	9
(Japan) Advan Sports Nova	Porsche 962C	Porsche Type-935/79 2.8 L Turbo Flat-6	Y	25	(Japan) Kunimitsu Takahashi	9
(Japan) Advan Sports Nova	Porsche 962C	Porsche Type-935/79 2.8 L Turbo Flat-6	Y	25	(Japan) Kenji Takahashi	9
(Japan) Advan Sports Nova	Porsche 962C	Porsche Type-935/79 2.8 L Turbo Flat-6	Y	25	(United Kingdom) Dave Scott	9
(Japan) From A Racing	Porsche 956	Porsche Type-935/79 2.8 L Turbo Flat-6	D	27	(Japan) Jirou Yoneyama	9
(Japan) From A Racing	Porsche 956	Porsche Type-935/79 2.8 L Turbo Flat-6	D	27	(Japan) Hideki Okada	9
(Japan) From A Racing	Porsche 956	Porsche Type-935/79 2.8 L Turbo Flat-6	D	27	(Japan) Tsunehisa Asai	9
(United Kingdom) Danone Porsche España with John Fitzpatrick Racing	Porsche 956B	Porsche Type-935/76 2.6 L Turbo Flat-6	G	33	(Spain) Emilio de Villota	1–3, 5–8
(United Kingdom) Danone Porsche España with John Fitzpatrick Racing	Porsche 956B	Porsche Type-935/76 2.6 L Turbo Flat-6	G	33	(Spain) Fermín Vélez	1–3, 5–8
(United Kingdom) Danone Porsche España with John Fitzpatrick Racing	Porsche 956B	Porsche Type-935/76 2.6 L Turbo Flat-6	G	33	(South Africa) George Fouché	3
(United Kingdom) Danone Porsche España with John Fitzpatrick Racing	Porsche 956B	Porsche Type-935/76 2.6 L Turbo Flat-6	G	33	(United Kingdom) Derek Bell	4
(United Kingdom) John Fitzpatrick Racing	Porsche 962C	Porsche Type-935/76 2.6 L Turbo Flat-6	G	55	(Spain) Paco Romero	3, 6
(United Kingdom) John Fitzpatrick Racing	Porsche 962C	Porsche Type-935/76 2.6 L Turbo Flat-6	G	55	(France) Philippe Alliot	3
(United Kingdom) John Fitzpatrick Racing	Porsche 962C	Porsche Type-935/76 2.6 L Turbo Flat-6	G	55	(France) Michel Trollé	3
(United Kingdom) John Fitzpatrick Racing	Porsche 962C	Porsche Type-935/76 2.6 L Turbo Flat-6	G	55	(Spain) Adrián Campos	6
(Japan) Cara International Racing	LM 06C	Toyota 4T-GT 2.1 L Turbo I4	Y	34	(Austria) Franz Konrad	9
(Japan) Cara International Racing	LM 06C	Toyota 4T-GT 2.1 L Turbo I4	Y	34	(Japan) Akio Morimoto	9
(Japan) Tom's	Tom's 86C	Toyota 4T-GT 2.1 L Turbo I4	B	35	(Japan) Toshio Suzuki	9
(Japan) Tom's	Tom's 86C	Toyota 4T-GT 2.1 L Turbo I4	B	35	(Japan) Hitoshi Ogawa	9
(Japan) Tom's	Tom's 86C	Toyota 4T-GT 2.1 L Turbo I4	B	35	(Japan) Kauru Hoshino	9
(Japan) Tom's	Tom's 86C	Toyota 4T-GT 2.1 L Turbo I4	B	36	(United Kingdom) Geoff Lees	3, 9
(Japan) Tom's	Tom's 86C	Toyota 4T-GT 2.1 L Turbo I4	B	36	(Japan) Satoru Nakajima	3, 9
(Japan) Tom's	Tom's 86C	Toyota 4T-GT 2.1 L Turbo I4	B	36	(Japan) Masanori Sekiya	3, 9
(Japan) Team Ikuzawa	Tom's 86C	Toyota 4T-GT 2.1 L Turbo I4	D	37	(United Kingdom) Kenny Acheson	9
(Japan) Team Ikuzawa	Tom's 86C	Toyota 4T-GT 2.1 L Turbo I4	D	37	(Republic of Ireland) Michael Roe	9
(Japan) Dome Motorsport	Dome 86C	Toyota 2T-GT 2.1 L Turbo I4	D	38	(Sweden) Eje Elgh	3, 9
(Japan) Dome Motorsport	Dome 86C	Toyota 2T-GT 2.1 L Turbo I4	D	38	(Italy) Beppe Gabbiani	3, 9
(Japan) Dome Motorsport	Dome 86C	Toyota 2T-GT 2.1 L Turbo I4	D	38	(Japan) Toshio Suzuki	3
(France) WM Secateva	WM P86	Peugeot ZNS4 2.6 L Turbo V6	M	41	(France) François Migault	3
(France) WM Secateva	WM P86	Peugeot ZNS4 2.6 L Turbo V6	M	41	(France) Jean-Daniel Raulet	3
(France) WM Secateva	WM P86	Peugeot ZNS4 2.6 L Turbo V6	M	41	(France) Michel Pignard	3
(France) Vetir Racing	Rondeau M382	Ford Cosworth DFL 3.3 L V8	D	45	(France) Patrick Oudet	3, 8
(France) Vetir Racing	Rondeau M382	Ford Cosworth DFL 3.3 L V8	D	45	(France) Jean-Claude Justice	3, 8
(France) Vetir Racing	Rondeau M382	Ford Cosworth DFL 3.3 L V8	D	45	(France) Rémy Julienne	3
(Japan) Auto Beaurex Motorsport	Tom's 85C	Toyota 4T-GT 2.1 L Turbo I4	D	45	(Japan) Naoki Nagasaka	9
(Japan) Auto Beaurex Motorsport	Tom's 85C	Toyota 4T-GT 2.1 L Turbo I4	D	45	(Sweden) Steven Andskär	9
(Japan) Auto Beaurex Motorsport	Tom's 85C	Toyota 4T-GT 2.1 L Turbo I4	Y	46	(Japan) Kazuo Mogi	9
(Japan) Auto Beaurex Motorsport	Tom's 85C	Toyota 4T-GT 2.1 L Turbo I4	Y	46	(Japan) Hideshi Matsuda	9
(Japan) Auto Beaurex Motorsport	Tom's 85C	Toyota 4T-GT 2.1 L Turbo I4	Y	46	(Japan) Naoki Nagasaka	9
(West Germany) Derichs Rennwagenbau	Zakspeed C1/8	Ford Cosworth DFL 4.0 L V8		46	(West Germany) Jan Thoelke	4
(France) Graff Racing	Rondeau M482	Ford Cosworth DFL 3.3 L V8	G	47	(France) Marc Menant	3
(France) Graff Racing	Rondeau M482	Ford Cosworth DFL 3.3 L V8	G	47	(France) Jean-Philippe Grand	3
(France) Graff Racing	Rondeau M482	Ford Cosworth DFL 3.3 L V8	G	47	(France) Jacques Groudchaux	3
(Japan) Alpha Cubic Racing Team	Porsche 956	Porsche Type-935/79 2.8 L Turbo Flat-6	B	48	(Japan) Noritake Takahara	9
(Japan) Alpha Cubic Racing Team	Porsche 956	Porsche Type-935/79 2.8 L Turbo Flat-6	B	48	(Japan) Chiyomi Totani	9
(Japan) Alpha Cubic Racing Team	Porsche 956	Porsche Type-935/79 2.8 L Turbo Flat-6	B	48	(Japan) Kenji Tohira	9
(Japan) SARD	SARD MC86X	Toyota 4T-GT 2.1 L Turbo I4	D	50	(Japan) Syuuroku Sasaki	9
(Japan) SARD	SARD MC86X	Toyota 4T-GT 2.1 L Turbo I4	D	50	(United Kingdom) David Sears	9
(United Kingdom) Silk Cut Jaguar	Jaguar XJR-6	Jaguar 6.5 L V12	D	51	(United States) Eddie Cheever	All
(United Kingdom) Silk Cut Jaguar	Jaguar XJR-6	Jaguar 6.5 L V12	D	51	(United Kingdom) Derek Warwick	1–3, 9
(United Kingdom) Silk Cut Jaguar	Jaguar XJR-6	Jaguar 6.5 L V12	D	51	(France) Jean-Louis Schlesser	3, 7–8
(United Kingdom) Silk Cut Jaguar	Jaguar XJR-6	Jaguar 6.5 L V12	D	51	(Italy) Gianfranco Brancatelli	5
(United Kingdom) Silk Cut Jaguar	Jaguar XJR-6	Jaguar 6.5 L V12	D	51	(United Kingdom) Martin Brundle	6
(United Kingdom) Silk Cut Jaguar	Jaguar XJR-6	Jaguar 6.5 L V12	D	51	(West Germany) Hans Heyer	7
(United Kingdom) Silk Cut Jaguar	Jaguar XJR-6	Jaguar 6.5 L V12	D	52	(Italy) Gianfranco Brancatelli	1–2, 9
(United Kingdom) Silk Cut Jaguar	Jaguar XJR-6	Jaguar 6.5 L V12	D	52	(France) Jean-Louis Schlesser	1–2, 5, 9
(United Kingdom) Silk Cut Jaguar	Jaguar XJR-6	Jaguar 6.5 L V12	D	52	(United States) Hurley Haywood	3
(United Kingdom) Silk Cut Jaguar	Jaguar XJR-6	Jaguar 6.5 L V12	D	52	(West Germany) Hans Heyer	3
(United Kingdom) Silk Cut Jaguar	Jaguar XJR-6	Jaguar 6.5 L V12	D	52	(United Kingdom) Brian Redman	3
(United Kingdom) Silk Cut Jaguar	Jaguar XJR-6	Jaguar 6.5 L V12	D	52	(United Kingdom) Derek Warwick	4–8
(United Kingdom) Silk Cut Jaguar	Jaguar XJR-6	Jaguar 6.5 L V12	D	52	(Netherlands) Jan Lammers	6–9
(United Kingdom) Silk Cut Jaguar	Jaguar XJR-6	Jaguar 6.5 L V12	D	53	(Italy) Gianfranco Brancatelli	3, 6–7
(United Kingdom) Silk Cut Jaguar	Jaguar XJR-6	Jaguar 6.5 L V12	D	53	(United Kingdom) Win Percy	3
(United Kingdom) Silk Cut Jaguar	Jaguar XJR-6	Jaguar 6.5 L V12	D	53	(United States) Hurley Haywood	3
(United Kingdom) Silk Cut Jaguar	Jaguar XJR-6	Jaguar 6.5 L V12	D	53	(France) Jean-Louis Schlesser	4–6
(United Kingdom) Silk Cut Jaguar	Jaguar XJR-6	Jaguar 6.5 L V12	D	53	(United Kingdom) Derek Warwick	5, 7
(United Kingdom) Silk Cut Jaguar	Jaguar XJR-6	Jaguar 6.5 L V12	D	53	(Netherlands) Jan Lammers	7
(West Germany) Victor Zakspeed Team	Zakspeed C1/8	Ford Cosworth DFL 4.0 L V8	G	56	(West Germany) Jochen Dauer	4
(Japan) Trust Racing Team	Porsche 956	Porsche Type-935/79 2.8 L Turbo Flat-6	D	60	(Japan) Keiichi Suzuki	9
(Japan) Trust Racing Team	Porsche 956	Porsche Type-935/79 2.8 L Turbo Flat-6	D	60	(Australia) Vern Schuppan	9
(Japan) Trust Racing Team	Porsche 956	Porsche Type-935/79 2.8 L Turbo Flat-6	D	60	(South Africa) George Fouché	9
(Switzerland) Kouros Racing Team	Sauber C8	Mercedes-Benz M117 5.0 L Turbo V8	G	61	(Denmark) John Nielsen	1–3
(Switzerland) Kouros Racing Team	Sauber C8	Mercedes-Benz M117 5.0 L Turbo V8	G	61	(France) Henri Pescarolo	1–2, 7–8
(Switzerland) Kouros Racing Team	Sauber C8	Mercedes-Benz M117 5.0 L Turbo V8	G	61	(New Zealand) Mike Thackwell	2–3, 7–8
(Switzerland) Kouros Racing Team	Sauber C8	Mercedes-Benz M117 5.0 L Turbo V8	G	62	(Austria) Dieter Quester	3
(Switzerland) Kouros Racing Team	Sauber C8	Mercedes-Benz M117 5.0 L Turbo V8	G	62	(West Germany) Christian Danner	3
(Switzerland) Kouros Racing Team	Sauber C8	Mercedes-Benz M117 5.0 L Turbo V8	G	62	(France) Henri Pescarolo	3
(West Germany) Ernst Schuster	Porsche 936C	Porsche Type-962/71 2.9 L Turbo Flat-6	D	63	(West Germany) Ernst Schuster	1–4, 7–8
(West Germany) Ernst Schuster	Porsche 936C	Porsche Type-962/71 2.9 L Turbo Flat-6	D	63	(West Germany) Siegfried Brunn	1–3, 7–8
(West Germany) Ernst Schuster	Porsche 936C	Porsche Type-962/71 2.9 L Turbo Flat-6	D	63	(West Germany) Rudi Seher	3, 7
(United Kingdom) Cosmik Racing Promotions	March 84G	Porsche Type-935/76 2.6 L Turbo Flat-6	A	66	(Greece) Costas Los	All
(United Kingdom) Cosmik Racing Promotions	March 84G	Porsche Type-935/76 2.6 L Turbo Flat-6	A	66	(West Germany) Jan Thoelke	1
(United Kingdom) Cosmik Racing Promotions	March 84G	Porsche Type-935/76 2.6 L Turbo Flat-6	A	66	(Canada) John Graham	2
(United Kingdom) Cosmik Racing Promotions	March 84G	Porsche Type-935/76 2.6 L Turbo Flat-6	A	66	(Australia) Neil Crang	3
(United Kingdom) Cosmik Racing Promotions	March 84G	Porsche Type-935/76 2.6 L Turbo Flat-6	A	66	(France) Raymond Touroul	3
(United Kingdom) Cosmik Racing Promotions	March 84G	Porsche Type-935/76 2.6 L Turbo Flat-6	A	66	(United Kingdom) Tiff Needell	5–6, 8–9
(United Kingdom) Cosmik Racing Promotions	March 84G	Porsche Type-935/76 2.6 L Turbo Flat-6	A	66	(West Germany) Volker Weidler	7

=== Group C2 ===
Entrant	Car	Engine	Tyre	No.	Drivers	Rounds
(United Kingdom) Spice Engineering	Spice SE86C	Ford Cosworth DFL 3.3 L V8	A	70	(United Kingdom) Ray Bellm	1–3, 5–9
(United Kingdom) Spice Engineering	Spice SE86C	Ford Cosworth DFL 3.3 L V8	A	70	(United Kingdom) Gordon Spice	1–3, 5–9
(United Kingdom) Spice Engineering	Spice SE86C	Ford Cosworth DFL 3.3 L V8	A	70	(Belgium) Jean-Michel Martin	3
(United Kingdom) John Bartlett Racing with Goodmans Sound	Chevron B62; Bardon DB1	Ford Cosworth DFL 3.3 L V8	A	72	(Morocco) Max Cohen-Olivar	1–2, 5
(United Kingdom) John Bartlett Racing with Goodmans Sound	Chevron B62; Bardon DB1	Ford Cosworth DFL 3.3 L V8	A	72	(United Kingdom) Roger Andreason	1
(United Kingdom) John Bartlett Racing with Goodmans Sound	Chevron B62; Bardon DB1	Ford Cosworth DFL 3.3 L V8	A	72	(United Kingdom) Nick Adams	2–3, 6
(United Kingdom) John Bartlett Racing with Goodmans Sound	Chevron B62; Bardon DB1	Ford Cosworth DFL 3.3 L V8	A	72	(Sweden) Kenneth Leim	2, 5, 7–9
(United Kingdom) John Bartlett Racing with Goodmans Sound	Chevron B62; Bardon DB1	Ford Cosworth DFL 3.3 L V8	A	72	(United Kingdom) Robin Donovan	3, 5–6, 9
(United Kingdom) John Bartlett Racing with Goodmans Sound	Chevron B62; Bardon DB1	Ford Cosworth DFL 3.3 L V8	A	72	(United Kingdom) Richard Jones	3
(United Kingdom) John Bartlett Racing with Goodmans Sound	Chevron B62; Bardon DB1	Ford Cosworth DFL 3.3 L V8	A	72	(United Kingdom) David Mercer	7–8
(United Kingdom) John Bartlett Racing with Goodmans Sound	Chevron B62; Bardon DB1	Ford Cosworth DFL 3.3 L V8	A	72	(United Kingdom) Ian Khan	8
(United Kingdom) John Bartlett Racing with Goodmans Sound	Chevron B62; Bardon DB1	Ford Cosworth DFL 3.3 L V8	A	72	(Japan) Yoshiyuki Ogura	9
(West Germany) Gebhardt Motorsport	Gebhardt JC853	Ford Cosworth DFL 3.3 L V8	A	74	(Sweden) Stanley Dickens	1–2, 4–5
(West Germany) Gebhardt Motorsport	Gebhardt JC853	Ford Cosworth DFL 3.3 L V8	A	74	(West Germany) Frank Jelinski	1
(West Germany) Gebhardt Motorsport	Gebhardt JC853	Ford Cosworth DFL 3.3 L V8	A	74	(United Kingdom) Max Payne	2, 5, 7
(West Germany) Gebhardt Motorsport	Gebhardt JC853	Ford Cosworth DFL 3.3 L V8	A	74	(France) Pierre de Thoisy	3
(West Germany) Gebhardt Motorsport	Gebhardt JC853	Ford Cosworth DFL 3.3 L V8	A	74	(France) Jean-François Yvon	3
(West Germany) Gebhardt Motorsport	Gebhardt JC853	Ford Cosworth DFL 3.3 L V8	A	74	(United Kingdom) Nick Adams	5
(West Germany) Gebhardt Motorsport	Gebhardt JC853	Ford Cosworth DFL 3.3 L V8	A	74	(Austria) Ernst Franzmaier	5
(West Germany) Gebhardt Motorsport	Gebhardt JC853	Ford Cosworth DFL 3.3 L V8	A	74	(Austria) Walter Lechner	7
(United Kingdom) ADA Engineering	Gebhardt JC843	Ford Cosworth DFL 3.3 L V8	A	75	(United Kingdom) Ian Harrower	1–3, 5–9
(United Kingdom) ADA Engineering	Gebhardt JC843	Ford Cosworth DFL 3.3 L V8	A	75	(United Kingdom) Evan Clements	1–3, 5–9
(United Kingdom) ADA Engineering	Gebhardt JC843	Ford Cosworth DFL 3.3 L V8	A	75	(United Kingdom) Tom Dodd-Noble	3
(United Kingdom) ADA Engineering	Gebhardt JC843	Ford Cosworth DFL 3.3 L V8	A	75	(Sweden) Stanley Dickens	7
(United Kingdom) Chamberlain Engineering	Tiga TS85	Hart 418T 1.8 L Turbo I4	A	77	(United Kingdom) Gareth Chapman	1–2, 5, 8–9
(United Kingdom) Chamberlain Engineering	Tiga TS85	Hart 418T 1.8 L Turbo I4	A	77	(United Kingdom) Will Hoy	1–2, 5, 8–9
(United Kingdom) Chamberlain Engineering	Tiga TS85	Hart 418T 1.8 L Turbo I4	A	77	(United States) Dan Murphy	2, 5, 8
(United Kingdom) Chamberlain Engineering	Tiga TS85	Hart 418T 1.8 L Turbo I4	A	77	(United Kingdom) Mike Sanders	9
(United Kingdom) Ecurie Ecosse	Ecosse C285	Ford Cosworth DFL 3.3 L V8	A	78	(United Kingdom) Mike Wilds	2
(United Kingdom) Ecurie Ecosse	Ecosse C285	Ford Cosworth DFL 3.3 L V8	A	78	(United Kingdom) Ray Mallock	2
(United Kingdom) Ecurie Ecosse	Ecosse C285	Ford Cosworth DFL 3.3 L V8	A	78	(United States) Les Delano	3
(United Kingdom) Ecurie Ecosse	Ecosse C285	Ford Cosworth DFL 3.3 L V8	A	78	(United States) Andy Petery	3
(United Kingdom) Ecurie Ecosse	Ecosse C285	Ford Cosworth DFL 3.3 L V8	A	78	(United States) John Hotchkis	3
(United Kingdom) Ecurie Ecosse	Ecosse C286	Rover V64V 3.0 L V6	A	79	(United Kingdom) Ray Mallock	2–3, 5, 7–9
(United Kingdom) Ecurie Ecosse	Ecosse C286	Rover V64V 3.0 L V6	A	79	(United Kingdom) Mike Wilds	2–3
(United Kingdom) Ecurie Ecosse	Ecosse C286	Rover V64V 3.0 L V6	A	79	(United Kingdom) David Leslie	3, 5
(United Kingdom) Ecurie Ecosse	Ecosse C286	Rover V64V 3.0 L V6	A	79	(Belgium) Marc Duez	7–9
(Italy) Carma FF SRL	Alba AR6	Carma 1.9 L Turbo I4	A	80	(Italy) Martino Finotto	1–2, 8
(Italy) Carma FF SRL	Alba AR6	Carma 1.9 L Turbo I4	A	80	(Italy) Carlo Facetti	1–2, 8
(Italy) Carma FF SRL	Alba AR6	Carma 1.9 L Turbo I4	A	80	(Italy) Ruggero Melgrati	2, 8
(Italy) Techno Racing	Alba AR3	Ford Cosworth DFL 3.3 L V8	A	83	(Italy) Luigi Taverna	1–3, 5, 8
(Italy) Techno Racing	Alba AR3	Ford Cosworth DFL 3.3 L V8	A	83	(Italy) Mario Sala	1–2
(Italy) Techno Racing	Alba AR3	Ford Cosworth DFL 3.3 L V8	A	83	(Switzerland) Marco Vanoli	2–3
(Italy) Techno Racing	Alba AR3	Ford Cosworth DFL 3.3 L V8	A	83	(Italy) Tony Palma	3, 5
(Italy) Techno Racing	Alba AR3	Ford Cosworth DFL 3.3 L V8	A	83	(Italy) Daniele Gasparri	5
(Italy) Techno Racing	Alba AR3	Ford Cosworth DFL 3.3 L V8	A	83	(Italy) Piercarlo Ghinzani	8
(Italy) Techno Racing	Alba AR3	Ford Cosworth DFL 3.3 L V8	A	83	(Italy) Gianpiero Lauro	8
(United Kingdom) Simpson Engineering	Simpson C286	Ford Cosworth DFV 3.0 L V8	A	84	(United Kingdom) Robin Smith	2, 5
(United Kingdom) Simpson Engineering	Simpson C286	Ford Cosworth DFV 3.0 L V8	A	84	(Italy) Stefano Sebastiani	2, 5
(United Kingdom) Simpson Engineering	Simpson C286	Ford Cosworth DFV 3.0 L V8	A	84	(United Kingdom) Richard Jones	2
(United Kingdom) Simpson Engineering	Simpson C286	Ford Cosworth DFV 3.0 L V8	A	84	(Republic of Ireland) Vivian Candy	5
(Japan) Shizumatsu Racing	Mazda 737C	Mazda 13B 1.3 L 2-rotor	D	85	(Japan) Seisaku Suzuki	9
(Japan) Shizumatsu Racing	Mazda 737C	Mazda 13B 1.3 L 2-rotor	D	85	(Japan) Tetsuji Shiratori	9
(Japan) Shizumatsu Racing	Mazda 737C	Mazda 13B 1.3 L 2-rotor	D	85	(Japan) Kaneyuki Okamoto	9
(United Kingdom) Ark Racing Arthur Hough Pressings	Ceekar 83J-1	Ford Cosworth BDX 2.0 L I4	A	88	(France) Rudi Thomann	2
(United Kingdom) Ark Racing Arthur Hough Pressings	Ceekar 83J-1	Ford Cosworth BDX 2.0 L I4	A	88	(United Kingdom) Mike Kimpton	2
(United Kingdom) Ark Racing Arthur Hough Pressings	Ceekar 83J-1	Ford Cosworth BDX 2.0 L I4	A	88	(United Kingdom) Chris Ashmore	2
(Japan) Mr S Racing Product	MCS Guppy	BMW M12 2.0 L I4	D	88	(Japan) Seiichi Sodeyama	9
(Japan) Mr S Racing Product	MCS Guppy	BMW M12 2.0 L I4	D	88	(Japan) Tooru Sawada	9
(Norway) Martin Schanche Racing	Argo JM19	Zakspeed 1.9 L Turbo I4	G	89	(Norway) Martin Schanche	All
(Norway) Martin Schanche Racing	Argo JM19	Zakspeed 1.9 L Turbo I4	G	89	(Norway) Birger Dyrstad	1–2
(Norway) Martin Schanche Racing	Argo JM19	Zakspeed 1.9 L Turbo I4	G	89	(Norway) Torgye Kleppe	2–3, 5–7, 9
(Norway) Martin Schanche Racing	Argo JM19	Zakspeed 1.9 L Turbo I4	G	89	(Republic of Ireland) Martin Birrane	3
(Norway) Martin Schanche Racing	Argo JM19	Zakspeed 1.9 L Turbo I4	G	89	(Republic of Ireland) David Kennedy	6, 8
(Norway) Martin Schanche Racing	Argo JM19	Zakspeed 1.9 L Turbo I4	G	89	(Austria) "Pierre Chauvet"	7
Jens Winther Castrol Denmark	URD C83	BMW M88 3.5 L I6	A	90	(Denmark) Jens Winther	2–3, 5, 7–8
Jens Winther Castrol Denmark	URD C83	BMW M88 3.5 L I6	A	90	(United Kingdom) David Mercer	2–3, 5
Jens Winther Castrol Denmark	URD C83	BMW M88 3.5 L I6	A	90	(Denmark) Lars-Viggo Jensen	3
Jens Winther Castrol Denmark	URD C83	BMW M88 3.5 L I6	A	90	(Switzerland) Angelo Pallavicini	7–8
(United Kingdom) PC Automotive with Texas Homecare	Royale RP40	Mitsubishi 2.0 L Turbo I4	A	91	(United Kingdom) Richard Piper	2
(United Kingdom) PC Automotive with Texas Homecare	Royale RP40	Mitsubishi 2.0 L Turbo I4	A	91	(United Kingdom) David Brodie	2
(France) Automobiles Louis Descartes	ALD 02	BMW M88 3.5 L I6	A	92	(France) Louis Descartes	1–3, 5, 7–8
(France) Automobiles Louis Descartes	ALD 02	BMW M88 3.5 L I6	A	92	(France) Jacques Heuclin	1–3, 5, 7–8
(France) Automobiles Louis Descartes	ALD 02	BMW M88 3.5 L I6	A	92	(France) Hubert Striebig	7–8
(France) Roland Bassaler	Sauber SHS C6	BMW M88 3.5 L I6	A	95	(France) Dominique Lacaud	3, 5, 7–8
(France) Roland Bassaler	Sauber SHS C6	BMW M88 3.5 L I6	A	95	(France) Roland Bassaler	3, 5, 7
(France) Roland Bassaler	Sauber SHS C6	BMW M88 3.5 L I6	A	95	(France) Yvon Tapy	3
(France) Roland Bassaler	Sauber SHS C6	BMW M88 3.5 L I6	A	95	(France) Pascal Pessiot	5
(France) Roland Bassaler	Sauber SHS C6	BMW M88 3.5 L I6	A	95	(France) Gerard Brucelle	7–8
(France) Roland Bassaler	Sauber SHS C6	BMW M88 3.5 L I6	A	95	(France) Gérard Tremblay	8
(United Kingdom) Roy Baker Racing Tiga	Tiga GC285	Ford Cosworth BDT 1.8 L Turbo I4	A	97	(United States) Mike Allison	3
(United Kingdom) Roy Baker Racing Tiga	Tiga GC285	Ford Cosworth BDT 1.8 L Turbo I4	A	97	(United States) Tom Frank	3
(United Kingdom) Roy Baker Racing Tiga	Tiga GC285	Ford Cosworth BDT 1.8 L Turbo I4	A	97	(United Kingdom) Val Musetti	3, 5
(United Kingdom) Roy Baker Racing Tiga	Tiga GC285	Ford Cosworth BDT 1.8 L Turbo I4	A	97	(United Kingdom) John Sheldon	4, 8
(United Kingdom) Roy Baker Racing Tiga	Tiga GC285	Ford Cosworth BDT 1.8 L Turbo I4	A	97	(United Kingdom) David Palmer	5–6
(United Kingdom) Roy Baker Racing Tiga	Tiga GC285	Ford Cosworth BDT 1.8 L Turbo I4	A	97	(Morocco) Max Cohen-Olivar	6, 8
(United Kingdom) Roy Baker Racing Tiga	Tiga GC285	Ford Cosworth BDT 1.8 L Turbo I4	A	97	(United Kingdom) John Williams	8
(United Kingdom) Roy Baker Racing Tiga	Tiga GC286	Ford Cosworth BDT 1.8 L Turbo I4	A	98	(United Kingdom) David Andrews	2–3, 5–9
(United Kingdom) Roy Baker Racing Tiga	Tiga GC286	Ford Cosworth BDT 1.8 L Turbo I4	A	98	(United Kingdom) Duncan Bain	2–3, 5, 9
(United Kingdom) Roy Baker Racing Tiga	Tiga GC286	Ford Cosworth BDT 1.8 L Turbo I4	A	98	(Australia) Michael Hall	2–3, 8
(United Kingdom) Roy Baker Racing Tiga	Tiga GC286	Ford Cosworth BDT 1.8 L Turbo I4	A	98	(Austria) "Pierre Chauvet"	6
(United Kingdom) Roy Baker Racing Tiga	Tiga GC286	Ford Cosworth BDT 1.8 L Turbo I4	A	98	(Morocco) Max Cohen-Olivar	7
(United Kingdom) Roy Baker Racing Tiga	Tiga GC286	Ford Cosworth BDT 1.8 L Turbo I4	A	99	(Denmark) Thorkild Thyrring	1–8
(United Kingdom) Roy Baker Racing Tiga	Tiga GC286	Ford Cosworth BDT 1.8 L Turbo I4	A	99	(United Kingdom) Dudley Wood	1
(United Kingdom) Roy Baker Racing Tiga	Tiga GC286	Ford Cosworth BDT 1.8 L Turbo I4	A	99	(United Kingdom) John Sheldon	2–3, 5–6
(United Kingdom) Roy Baker Racing Tiga	Tiga GC286	Ford Cosworth BDT 1.8 L Turbo I4	A	99	(United States) Nick Nicholson	3
(United Kingdom) Roy Baker Racing Tiga	Tiga GC286	Ford Cosworth BDT 1.8 L Turbo I4	A	99	(United Kingdom) Duncan Bain	7, 9
(United Kingdom) Roy Baker Racing Tiga	Tiga GC286	Ford Cosworth BDT 1.8 L Turbo I4	A	99	(United Kingdom) Les Blackburn	8
(United Kingdom) Roy Baker Racing Tiga	Tiga GC286	Ford Cosworth BDT 1.8 L Turbo I4	A	99	(United Kingdom) Roy Baker	9
(United Kingdom) Roy Baker Racing Tiga	Tiga GC286	Ford Cosworth BDT 1.8 L Turbo I4	A	99	(France) Rudi Thomann	9
(France) WM Secateva	WM P83B	Peugeot ZNS4 2.6 L Turbo I4	M	100	(France) Roger Dorchy	3
(France) WM Secateva	WM P83B	Peugeot ZNS4 2.6 L Turbo I4	M	100	(France) Pascal Pessiot	3
(France) WM Secateva	WM P83B	Peugeot ZNS4 2.6 L Turbo I4	M	100	(Switzerland) Claude Haldi	3
(France) Lucien Rossiaud	Rondeau M379C	Ford Cosworth DFV 3.0 L V8	A	102	(France) Lucien Rossiaud	3, 5, 8
(France) Lucien Rossiaud	Rondeau M379C	Ford Cosworth DFV 3.0 L V8	A	102	(France) Bruno Sotty	3, 5, 8
(France) Lucien Rossiaud	Rondeau M379C	Ford Cosworth DFV 3.0 L V8	A	102	(France) Noël del Bello	3, 5, 8
(France) Jean-Claude Ferrarin	Isolia 002	Ford Cosworth DFV 3.0 L V8		104	(France) Jean-Claude Ferrarin	5, 7–8
(France) Jean-Claude Ferrarin	Isolia 002	Ford Cosworth DFV 3.0 L V8		104	(France) Philippe Mazué	5, 7–8
(Italy) Kelmar Racing	Tiga GC85	Ford Cosworth DFL 3.3 L V8	A	105	(Italy) Pasquale Barberio	1–2, 5–8
(Italy) Kelmar Racing	Tiga GC85	Ford Cosworth DFL 3.3 L V8	A	105	(Switzerland) Jean-Pierre Frey	1
(Italy) Kelmar Racing	Tiga GC85	Ford Cosworth DFL 3.3 L V8	A	105	(Italy) Maurizio Gellini	2, 5–8
(Italy) Kelmar Racing	Tiga GC85	Ford Cosworth DFL 3.3 L V8	A	105	(New Zealand) John Nicholson	2, 5
(Sweden) Strandell	Strandell 85	Porsche 3.3 L Turbo Flat-6		106	(Sweden) Lars Hellberg	3
(Sweden) Strandell	Strandell 85	Porsche 3.3 L Turbo Flat-6		106	(Sweden) Kenneth Leim	3
(Sweden) Strandell	Strandell 85	Porsche 3.3 L Turbo Flat-6		106	(West Germany) Peter Fritsch	3

== Season results ==
Points were awarded to the top 10 finishers in the order of 20-15-12-10-8-6-4-3-2-1, with the following exceptions:

- Drivers failing to drive the car within a certain percentage of the laps in a race were not given points.
- Teams were only given points for their highest finishing car with no point awarded for positions filled by additional cars. Drivers Championship points were still awarded to the drivers of these cars.
- Neither driver nor teams scored points if they did not complete 90% of the winner's distance.

=== Races ===
Rnd	Circuit	C1 Winning team	C2 Winning team	Results
Rnd	Circuit	C1 Winning drivers	C2 Winning drivers	Results
Rnd	Circuit	C1 Winning car	C2 Winning car	Results
1	Monza	(Germany) Rothmans Porsche	(Germany) Gebhardt Motorsport	Results
1	Monza	(Germany) Hans-Joachim Stuck (United Kingdom) Derek Bell	(Germany) Frank Jelinski (Sweden) Stanley Dickens	Results
1	Monza	Porsche 962C	Gebhardt JC853 Ford Cosworth	Results
2	Silverstone	(United Kingdom) Silk Cut Jaguar	(United Kingdom) Spice Engineering	Results
2	Silverstone	(United States) Eddie Cheever (United Kingdom) Derek Warwick	(United Kingdom) Gordon Spice (United Kingdom) Ray Bellm	Results
2	Silverstone	Jaguar XJR-6	Spice SE86C Ford Cosworth	Results
3	La Sarthe	(Germany) Rothmans Porsche	(United Kingdom) ADA Engineering	Results
3	La Sarthe	(Germany) Hans-Joachim Stuck (United Kingdom) Derek Bell (United States) Al Holbert	(United Kingdom) Ian Harrower (United Kingdom) Evan Clements (United Kingdom) Tom Dodd-Noble	Results
3	La Sarthe	Porsche 962C	Gebhardt JC843 Ford Cosworth	Results
4	Norisring	(Germany) Joest Racing	(Germany) Gebhardt Racing	Results
4	Norisring	(Germany) Klaus Ludwig	(Sweden) Stanley Dickens	Results
4	Norisring	Porsche 956	Gebhardt JC853 Ford Cosworth	Results
5	Brands Hatch	(United Kingdom) Richard Lloyd Racing	(United Kingdom) Ecurie Ecosse	Results
5	Brands Hatch	(France) Bob Wollek (Italy) Mauro Baldi	(United Kingdom) Ray Mallock (United Kingdom) David Leslie	Results
5	Brands Hatch	Porsche 956 GTi	Ecosse C286 Rover	Results
6	Jerez	(Switzerland) Brun Motorsport	(United Kingdom) Spice Engineering	Results
6	Jerez	(Argentina) Oscar Larrauri (Spain) Jesús Pareja	(United Kingdom) Gordon Spice (United Kingdom) Ray Bellm	Results
6	Jerez	Porsche 962C	Spice SE86C Ford Cosworth	Results
7	Nürburgring	(Switzerland) Kouros Racing Team	(United Kingdom) Ecurie Ecosse	Results
7	Nürburgring	(New Zealand) Mike Thackwell (France) Henri Pescarolo	(United Kingdom) Ray Mallock (Belgium) Marc Duez	Results
7	Nürburgring	Sauber C8 Mercedes-Benz	Ecosse C286 Rover	Results
8	Spa-Francorchamps	(Switzerland) Brun Motorsport	(United Kingdom) Ecurie Ecosse	Results
8	Spa-Francorchamps	(Belgium) Thierry Boutsen (Germany) Frank Jelinski	(United Kingdom) Ray Mallock (Belgium) Marc Duez	Results
8	Spa-Francorchamps	Porsche 962C	Ecosse C286 Rover	Results
9	Fuji	(Germany) Joest Racing	(United Kingdom) Ecurie Ecosse	Results
9	Fuji	(Italy) Paolo Barilla (Italy) Piercarlo Ghinzani	(United Kingdom) Ray Mallock (Belgium) Marc Duez	Results
9	Fuji	Porsche 956	Ecosse C286 Rover	Results

== Results ==
=== Drivers Championship ===
Derek Bell and Hans-Joachim Stuck usually shared a factory Porsche 962C and both scored 82 championship points; however Bell was declared champion as he finished in a higher placing than Stuck at the Norisring round, the only event at which they did not compete together. The round was a 180 km race which doubled as a race in the ADAC Supercup, for which Porsche had contracted Stuck as driver, so Stuck raced the works Porsche solo, while Bell was forced to look for a separate drive, ending up with a 2.6 litre private 956 run by John Fitzpatrick. After leading the early stages, Stuck spent ten laps in the pits with a gearbox problem, ultimately finishing 15th; while Bell, outgunned significantly on power, was able to finish 11th, just outside the points. However the positions were used to break the points tie between Bell and Stuck for the title.

=== FIA Cup for Group C2 Drivers ===
The FIA Cup for Group C2 Drivers was awarded jointly to Raymond Bellim and Gordon Spice, who shared an Ecosse.

=== Teams Championship ===
All cars were eligible to score points towards the Teams Championship, and Group C2 cars were also eligible to score points for the FIA Cup for C2 Teams.

No Teams Championship points were awarded for Rounds 1, 4, 5, and 6.

Pos	Team	Chassis	Engine	Rd 2	Rd 3	Rd 7	Rd 8	Rd 9	Total
1	(Switzerland) Brun Motorsport	Porsche 956B; Porsche 962C	Porsche 2.6L Turbo Flat-6	2	15		20	15	52
2	(Germany) Joest Racing	Porsche 956B	Porsche 2.6L Turbo Flat-6	6	12		10	20	48
3=	(United Kingdom) TWR Silk Cut Jaguar	Jaguar XJR-6	Jaguar 6.5L V12	20			15	12	47
3=	(Germany) Rothmans Porsche	Porsche 962C	Porsche 2.6L Turbo Flat-6; Porsche 3.0L Turbo Flat-6	15	20		12		47
5	(United Kingdom) John Fitzpatrick Racing	Porsche 956B; Porsche 962C	Porsche 2.6L Turbo Flat-6	8	10	12			30
6	(Switzerland) Kouros Racing Team	Sauber C8	Mercedes M117 5.0L Turbo V8	3		20	6		29
7	(United Kingdom) Richard Lloyd Racing	Porsche 956B GTi	Porsche 2.6L Turbo Flat-6	10	2	15	1		28
8	(Germany) Porsche Kremer Racing	Porsche 956B; Porsche 962C	Porsche 2.6L Turbo Flat-6; Porsche 2.8L Turbo Flat-6	12				10	22
9	(Germany) Obermaier Racing	Porsche 956B	Porsche 2.6L Turbo Flat-6		8	10			18
10	(United Kingdom) Ecurie Ecosse	Ecosse C285; Ecosse C286	Ford Cosworth DFL 3.3L V8; Rover V64V 3.0L V6			8			8
11=	(Germany) Ernst Schuster Porsche	Porsche 936C	Porsche 2.8L Turbo Flat-6		6				6
11=	(Germany) Gebhardt Motorsport	Gebhardt JC853	Ford Cosworth DFL 3.3L V8			6			6
11=	(Japan) Trust Racing Team	Porsche 956B	Porsche 2.6L Turbo Flat-6					6	6
11=	(United Kingdom) ADA Engineering	Gebhardt JC843	Ford Cosworth DFL 3.3L V8		3	3			6
15=	(Germany) Porsche AG	Porsche 961	Porsche 2.6L Turbo Flat-6		4				4
15=	(United Kingdom) Spice Engineering	Spice SE86C	Ford Cosworth DFL 3.3L V8			4			4
17	(Japan) Advan Sports Nova	Porsche 962C	Porsche 2.6L Turbo Flat-6					3	3
18=	(Denmark) Jens Winther	URD C83	BMW 3.5L I6			2			2
18=	(Japan) Tom's Toyota	Tom's 86C	Toyota 4T-GT 2.1L Turbo I4					2	2
20=	(Japan) Hoshino Racing	March 86S	Nissan VG30ET 3.0L V6					1	1
20=	(United Kingdom) Cosmik Racing	March 84G	Porsche 2.6L Turbo Flat-6			1			1

=== FIA Cup for Group C2 Teams ===
Pos	Team	Chassis	Engine	Rd 2	Rd 3	Rd 7	Rd 8	Rd 9	Total
1	(United Kingdom) Ecurie Ecosse	Ecosse C285; Ecosse C286	Ford Cosworth DFL 3.3L V8; Rover V64V 3.0L V6		10	20	20	20	70
2	(United Kingdom) Spice Engineering	Spice SE86C	Ford Cosworth DFL 3.3L V8	20	6	12	15	15	68
3	(United Kingdom) ADA Engineering	Gebhardt JC843	Ford Cosworth DFL 3.3L V8	12	20	10	12	10	64
4	(Denmark) Jens Winther	URD C83	BMW 3.5L I6	10	15	8	10		43
5=	(Italy) Kelmar Racing	Tiga GC85	Ford Cosworth DFL 3.3L V8	15					15
5=	(Germany) Gebhardt Motorsport	Gebhardt JC853	Ford Cosworth DFL 3.3L V8			15			15
7	(France) Lucien Rossiaud	Rondeau M379C	Ford Cosworth DFV 3.0L V8		8		6		14
8	(France) Automobiles Louis Descartes	ALD 02	BMW 3.5L I6	8		3	2		13
9	(United Kingdom) Roy Baker Racing	Tiga GC285; Tiga GC286	Ford Cosworth BDT 1.7L Turbo I4			4	3	6	13
10=	(France) WM Secateva	WM P85	Peugeot ZNS4 3.0L Turbo V6		12				12
10=	(Norway) Martin Schanche Racing	Argo JM19	Zakspeed 1.8L Turbo I4					12	12
12=	(Japan) Shizumatsu Racing	Mazda 737C	Mazda 13B 1.3L 2-Rotor					8	8
12=	(United Kingdom) John Bartlett Racing	Bardon DB1	Ford Cosworth DFL 3.3L V8				8		8
14=	(United Kingdom) Simpson Engineering	Simpson C286	Ford Cosworth DFV 3.0L V8	6					6
14=	(France) Roland Bassaler	Sauber SHS C6	BMW 3.5L I6			6			6
16	(United Kingdom) Chamberlain Engineering	Tiga TS85	Hart 1.8L Turbo I4				4		4
