= Emilio de Villota =

Spanish racing driver (born 1946)

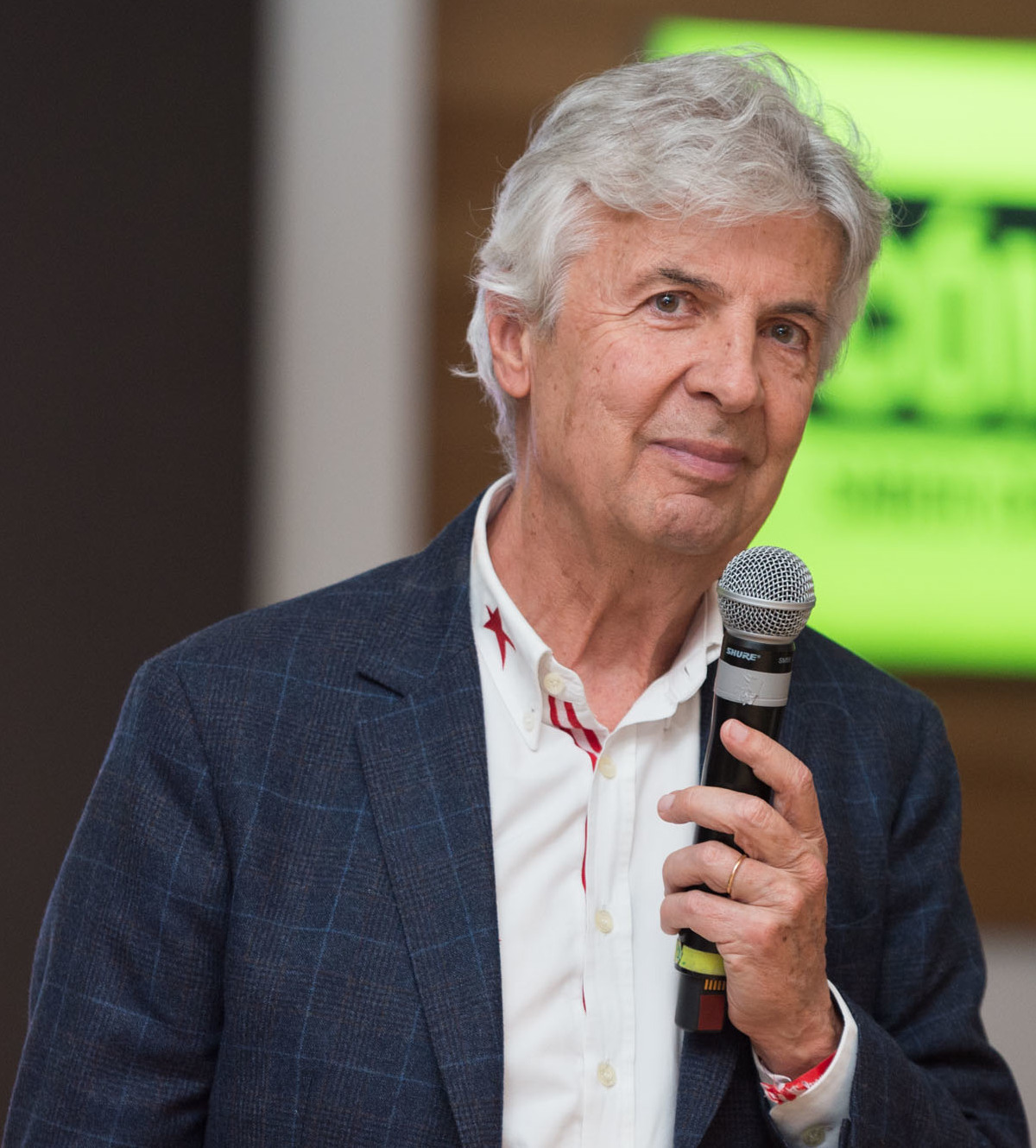
- De Villota in 2018
- Born: Emilio de Villota Ruíz; 26 July 1946 (age 80); Madrid, Spain
- Children: María; Emilio Jr.

Formula One World Championship career
- Nationality: (Spain) Spanish
- Active years: 1976–1978, 1981–1982
- Team(s): RAM, privateer McLaren, privateer Williams, March
- Entries: 15 (2 starts)
- Championships: 0
- Wins: 0
- Podiums: 0
- Career points: 0
- Pole positions: 0
- Fastest laps: 0
- First entry: 1976 Spanish Grand Prix
- Last entry: 1982 Dutch Grand Prix

British Formula One Championship career
- Active years: 1978–1980
- Entries: 39 (39 starts)
- Championships: 1 (1980)
- Wins: 9
- Podiums: 18
- Career points: 236
- Pole positions: 10
- Fastest laps: 10

World Sportscar Championship career
- Years active: 1981–1982, 1986–1987
- Teams: Lola, Grid, Porsche, Kremer
- Starts: 19
- Championships: 0
- Wins: 2
- Podiums: 3
- Poles: 0
- Fastest laps: 1

24 Hours of Le Mans career
- Years: 1981–1982, 1986
- Teams: Lola, Grid, Porsche
- Best finish: 4th (1986)
- Class wins: 0

Emilio de Villota Ruíz (born 26 July 1946) is a Spanish former racing driver, who competed in Formula One between 1976 and 1982. (Note: The exact years de Villota competed in Formula One: 1976–1978, 1981–1982.)

De Villota entered 15 World Championship Grands Prix, qualifying twice. He entered most Spanish Grand Prix between 1976 and 1982 and became a major force in the short-lived British Formula One Championship, winning the title in 1980.

== Career ==
De Villota first arrived on the international motor sport scene in 1972, when he raced a SEAT 124 SC, in the 4 Horas de Jarama, a round of the European Touring Car Championship [ETCC]. In a car entered by Scuderia Filipinetti, was co-driven by H. Hengstenberg to 15th place overall. De Villota would not return to international motor sport until 1975, when he re-visited the ETCC, this time in a Ford Capri RS 2600, this time aided by Jorge de Bagration. The pair did not finish in the Zandvoort Trophy, held at the Circuit Park Zandvoort. However, when the Spanish pairing were joined by "Nicha" Cabral, for their home race, the 4 Horas de Jarama, they finished second, albeit five laps adrift of the winner.

For 1976, de Villota turned his back on Touring Cars to try his luck in single-seaters, with the ultimate aim of racing in the World Championship. In order to gain experience of high-powered racing cars, he entered the Shellsport G8 International Series. This was a UK-based Formula Libre championship which ran F1, F2, F5000 and Formula Atlantic cars in the same races. Racing with the Lyncar Engineering Ltd., de Villota scored two fifth places, and finished the season 14th in the overall standings.

Using a regulation which allowed the participation of private teams or drivers who could purchase a car and race alongside the official teams, de Villota debuted in the 1976 World Championship driving a Cosworth powered Brabham BT44B, purchased in effect to participate in the Gran Premio de España. De Villota failed to qualify, and did not return until the following season.

De Villota returned to England for the start of the next season, once again racing for Lyncar which was now entered under the name of Iberia Airlines, winning for opening race of the 1977 Shellsport G8 International Series, at Mallory Park. However, after just four meetings, de Villota abandoned the series for F1.

In 1977, de Villota developed a more ambitious project that would make him one of the first Spaniards to participate in Formula 1 after drivers such as Alfonso de Portago and Alex Soler-Roig. Under the sponsorship of Iberia, de Villota led a modest outfit that raced under the name of Iberia Airlines F1 and contested seven Grands Prix of the European season. For the project Iberia acquired a McLaren M23, Ford-Cosworth DFV engines, the cars painted in the colours of the airline. De Villota would qualify for just two of these Grands Prix, the first was his home event, Gran Premio de España, where he would finish 13th, albeit five laps adrift of the winner. The other race he started was the Grand Prix von Österreich, where an accident on the last lap deprived him of the finish, nevertheless classified in 17th position.

Between Grands Prix, de Villota did a number of selected Shellsport G8 races in his F1 McLaren, winning twice. He followed his earlier victory at Mallory, by winning there again, then taking the chequered flag at Brands Hatch. Although his season was split in two by his Grand Prix racing, de Villota still finished fifth in the championship.

De Villota attempted to privately contest the 1978 Gran Premio de España, failing again in qualifying. After this failure he turned his back on Formula One and turned his attention to the new Aurora AFX Formula One Championship. In the Aurora championship, racing was cheaper and was therefore less dependent on sponsorships, thus making it more competitive. This proved to be the case with de Villota finishing third overall in 1978 and 1979, then being proclaimed champion in 1980 with a RAM Racing prepared Williams FW07. During this spell, he won nine races, including the infamous Gran Premio Lotteria di Monza.

De Villota's main focus for 1978, was the Aurora AFX F1 Championship. This series replaced the Shellsport Group 8 series. He continued to race his McLaren, now entered under the Centro Asegurador banner. The season started promising the trip to the podium in the first three races, however he was unable to keep the momentum going and failed to visit the podium again, although it was still enough to finish third overall at the end of the season.

For the 1979 Aurora AFX F1 Championship, de Villota switched to Lotus-Cosworth 78, prepared and entered by Madom F1 Team. Following a series of poor results, de Villota turned his season around by finishing on the podium in six straights races, winning four of them at Thruxton, Zandvoort, Oulton Park, and Nogaro. Then his poor early season form returned with three retirements in the last five races, with only one point finish. This left him third once again in the overall standings.

De Villota again tried to qualify for the 1980 Gran Premio de España at the wheel of a RAM Racing prepared Williams-Cosworth FW07, which Banco Occidental sponsorship. Originally scheduled to be part of the Formula One World Championship, following the running of the race it was announced that World Championship points would not be awarded to the competitors, making it a non-championship race. He distinguished himself during the race by tripping up both Carlos Reutemann and Jacques Laffite in their battle for the lead.

Back in the Aurora AFX F1, de Villota was at the wheel of the same Williams FW07, as he raced in Spain. Having switched to RAM Racing for the Aurora series as well, de Villota brought the FW07 home, on the podium in nine of eleven races he entered, winning five of them. Twice at Mallory Park, Brands Hatch, Silvestone and the big money event in Italy, the Gran Premio Lotteria di Monza. For one race, RAM switched de Villota to their Fittipaldi F5A, in which he still finished in fifth position. Adding this to the other trips to the podium, de Villota was crowned champion.

For 1981, de Villota made the switch to the World Endurance Championship of Drivers. Having signed for Team Lola, to race their Group 6 Cosworth DFV powered Lola T600, alongside Guy Edwards, they made a poor start to the season, failing to finish their first two races. After an eighth place in the ADAC 1000 km Rennen Nürburgring, the pair are joined by Juan Fernández, for what would be de Villota's first race at the Circuit de la Sarthe. The trio finish 15th overall, and third in class. The strong result from Le Mans inspired de Villota and Edwards who would win their next race, the Coppa Florio, 6 ore Enna-Pergusa by two laps, albeit from a field made up by entrants from the Italian Group 6 Championship. The pair would win once more in 1981, this time for season finale, Flying Tiger 1000. In the intermittent rain at Brands Hatch, they would win by a margin of eight laps.

In 1982, de Villota made his final attempt to qualify for another Formula 1 race. As a privateer again (with LBT Team March) and this time in a March 821, powered by Ford Cosworth, sought qualification, unsuccessfully for five Grands Prix, It was to be the first time in his career as a racing driver, he would crossed the Atlantic to compete outside Europe.

Away from F1, de Villota continued to race sportscar, in the new Group C category with the Grid Plaza Racing team. The team was under-financed, and undertook a limited World Endurance Championship for Drivers and Manufacturers and Camel GT Championship programme in 1982, and only once finished in the points, claiming tenth in the Shell Oils 1000 Kilometres, at Brands Hatch, when de Villota was joined by Derek Daly and Fred Stiff.

De Villota continued with Grid Racing into 1983. However, their Cosworth-powered Grid S1 remained unreliable, with de Villota only finishing once in the points. Like 1982, this was at Brands Hatch, in the European Endurance Championship race. For the Grand Prix International 1000km, he was joined by Skeeter McKitterick and Dudley Wood, as they bring the Grid home in eighth place. Away from sportscars, de Villota tried his hand in two other categories with very mixed success. He had two drives in Formula Two; a ninth place at Silverstone with James Gresham Racing, in their March-BMW 832 and 13th at Jarama, for Minardi Team Srl aboard their Minardi-BMW M283. The other category was away from the international scene. Driving a Ford Capri RS3000, de Villota won the Spanish Touring Car Championship.

For 1984, Grid Racing had produced a new car, the Grid-Porsche S2. De Villota raced the car in the Budweiser Grand Prix of Miami, but did not complete a lap. He did not race again that season. He did return to the ETCC in 1985 with Escuderia Mezquita, taking in two races. He co-drove with Francisco Romero, finishing both races; 18th in the Vallelunga 500 km and 17th in the Donington 500, in their VW Golf GTi.

Having obtained Spanish backing from Danone for 1986, John Fitzpatrick Racing needed two Spanish drivers. De Villota was one, and he was joined at the team by Fermín Velez. Although the pair only racing seven times, they scored five top ten finished in the Porsche 956. This included a third in the ADAC Kouros 1000 km Nürburgring, and a fourth in the 24 Hour of Le Mans. This would be de Villota's last trip to Le Mans 24 hours.

The opening two races of the 1987 World Sport-Prototype Championship was held in Spain, Kremer Racing paired two local drivers for these races. Paco Romero joined de Villota in the Marlboro-sponsored Porsche 962C. The pair finished tenth at Jarama and then eighth at Jerez. De Villota stepped away from Group C racing, to race to eighth overall in the Porsche 944 Turbo Cup.

By 1988, de Villota had retired from International racing, although he still won three Spanish Porsche Carrera Cup Championships in four years (1993, 1995 and 1996) at national level. However, in 1996 he raced in Porsche 911 Bi-Turbo in the Gran Premio Repsol Resistencia Del Jarama, a round of the BRP Global GT series, alongside Pablo de Villota and Fulvio Ballabio. It would be five more years before he reappears, this time at Estoril, racing a Porsche 911 GT2, in a Spanish GT race. De Villota still races, albeit mostly in Spain.

=== After retiring ===
De Villota currently heads the team and racing school, Emilio de Villota Motorsport. His son Emilio de Villota Jr. has raced in Formula Three and Formula 3000. His daughter María de Villota was a test driver for Marussia F1; a major crash in a test in July 2012 left her with serious injuries; she died in October 2013.

== Racing record ==
=== Career highlights ===
Season	Series	Position	Team	Car
1975	European Touring Car Championship	14th		Ford Capri RS 2600
1976	Shellsport G8 International Series	14th	Roger Heavens Racing	Lyncar-Cosworth 006
1977	Shellsport G8 International Series	5th	Emilio de Villota Iberia F1	Lyncar-Cosworth 006; McLaren-Cosworth M23
1978	Aurora AFX F1 Championship	3rd	Centro Asegurador F1	McLaren-Cosworth M23
1979	Aurora AFX F1 Championship	3rd	Madom F1 Team	Lotus-Cosworth 78
1980	Aurora AFX F1 Championship	**1st**	RAM Racing	Williams-Cosworth FW07; Fittipaldi-Cosworth F5A
1981	World Endurance Championship of Drivers	21st	Team Lola	Lola-Cosworth T600
1982	Deutsche Rennsport Meisterschaft	21st	Grid Plaza	Grid-Cosworth S1
	Camel GT Championship	47th	Grid Racing	Grid-Cosworth S1
	FIA World Endurance Championship of Drivers	117th	Grid Racing	Grid-Cosworth S1
1983	Campeonato Español de Turismos	**1st**		Ford Capri RS 3000
	FIA European Endurance Championship of Drivers	70th	Grid Racing	Grid-Cosworth S1
1986	FIA World Sports Prototype Championship	12th	Danone Porsche España	Porsche 956B
1987	Porsche 944 Turbo Cup	8th		Porsche 944 Turbo
	FIA World Sports Prototype Championship	47th	Porsche Kremer Racing	Porsche 962C
1993	Spanish Porsche Carrera Cup	**1st**		Porsche 911 Carrera
1995	Spanish Porsche Carrera Cup	**1st**		Porsche 911 Carrera
1996	Spanish Porsche Carrera Cup	**1st**		Porsche 911 Carrera
2011	Spanish Prototype Open Championship – Proto 1	5th	Radical España	Radical SR3

=== Complete Formula One World Championship results ===
(key)

Year	Entrant	Chassis	Engine	1	2	3	4	5	6	7	8	9	10	11	12	13	14	15	16	17	WDC	Pts
1976	RAM Racing	Brabham BT44B	Ford Cosworth DFV 3.0 V8	BRA	RSA	USW	ESP; DNQ	BEL	MON	SWE	FRA	GBR	GER	AUT	NED	ITA	CAN	USA	JPN		NC	0
1977	Iberia Airlines	McLaren M23	Ford Cosworth DFV 3.0 V8	ARG	BRA	RSA	USW	ESP; 13	MON	BEL; DNQ	SWE; DNQ	FRA	GBR; DNQ	GER; DNQ	AUT; 17	NED	ITA; DNQ	USA	CAN	JPN	NC	0
1978	Centro Asegurador	McLaren M25/M23 (Note: De Villota originally entered a McLaren M25 in the Spanish Grand Prix, but reverted to the M23 after the M25 got damaged in a practice crash.)	Ford Cosworth DFV 3.0 V8	ARG	BRA	RSA	USW	MON	BEL	ESP; DNQ	SWE	FRA	GBR	GER	AUT	NED	ITA	USA	CAN		NC	0
1981	Banco Occidental	Williams FW07	Ford Cosworth DFV 3.0 V8	USW	BRA	ARG	SMR	BEL	MON	ESP; EX	FRA	GBR	GER	AUT	NED	ITA	CAN	CPL			NC	0
1982	LBT Team March	March 821	Ford Cosworth DFV 3.0 V8	RSA	BRA	USW	SMR	BEL; DNPQ	MON; DNPQ	DET; DNQ	CAN; DNQ	NED; DNPQ	GBR	FRA	GER	AUT	SUI	ITA	CPL		NC	0

=== Non-Championship Formula One results ===
(key)

Year	Entrant	Chassis	Engine	1	2	3
1978	Centro Asegurador	McLaren M23	Ford Cosworth DFV 3.0 V8	INT; Ret		
1979	Madom Formula 1 Team	Lotus 78	Ford Cosworth DFV 3.0 V8	ROC; Ret	GNM	DIN
1980	Occidental F-1 RAM	Williams FW07	Ford Cosworth DFV 3.0 V8	ESP; Ret		

=== Complete Shellsport International Series/British Formula One Championship results ===
(key) (Races in bold indicate pole position; races in italics indicate fastest lap)

Year	Entrant	Chassis	Engine	1	2	3	4	5	6	7	8	9	10	11	12	13	14	15	Pos.	Pts
1976	Roger Heavens Racing	Lyncar 006	Ford Cosworth DFV 3.0 V8	MAL; DNS	SNE; 5	OUL; Ret	BRH; 10	THR	BRH; 5	MAL; 10	SNE; DNS	BRH; 18	THR; 8	OUL	BRH; 10	BRH; 7			14th	26
1977	Iberia Airlines	Lyncar 006	Ford Cosworth DFV 3.0 V8	MAL; 1	SNE; Ret	OUL; DNS	BRH; DNS	MAL	THR	BRH	OUL								5th	76
1977	Iberia Airlines	McLaren M23	Ford Cosworth DFV 3.0 V8									MAL; 1	DON	BRH; 1	THR	SNE; 3			5th	76
1977	Iberia Airlines	McLaren M25	Ford Cosworth DFV 3.0 V8														BRH; Ret		5th	76
1978	Centro Asegurador F1	McLaren M25	Ford Cosworth DFV 3.0 V8	OUL; 2	BRH; 3	SNE; 2	MAL; 4	ZAN; Ret	DON; 5				BRH; Ret	**THR**; 8	**SNE**; 8				**3rd**	**86**
1978	Boxer Cars	Boxer PR276	Hart 420R 2.0 L4							THR; 7									**3rd**	**86**
1978	Centro Asegurador F1	McLaren M23	Ford Cosworth DFV 3.0 V8								**OUL**; Ret	MAL; 4							**3rd**	**86**
1979	Madom F1 Team	Lotus 78	Ford Cosworth DFV 3.0 V8	ZOL; Ret	OUL; 7	BRH; Ret	MAL; 4	SNE; 3	THR; 1	ZAN; 1	DON; 2	OUL; 1	NOG; 1	**MAL**; 6	BRH; Ret	THR; Ret	SNE; 8	SIL; Ret	**3rd**	**55**
1980	RAM Racing	Williams FW07	Ford Cosworth DFV 3.0 V8	**OUL**; 2	**BRH**; Ret	SIL; 2	MAL; 1		**MNZ**; 1	**MAL**; 1	SNE; 3	**BRH**; 1	THR; 2	OUL; Ret	**SIL**; 1				**1st**	**85**
1980	RAM Racing	Fittipaldi F5A	Ford Cosworth DFV 3.0 V8					THR; 5											**1st**	**85**

=== Complete World Sportscar Championship results ===
(key) (Races in bold indicate pole position; races in italics indicate fastest lap)

Year	Entrant	Class	Chassis	Engine	1	2	3	4	5	6	7	8	9	10	11	12	13	14	15	Pos.	Pts
1981	Grid Team Lola	S +2.0	Lola T600	Cosworth DFL 3.3 V8	DAY	SEB	MUG	MNZ; Ret	RSD			LMS; 15								21st	53
1981	Banco Occidental Ultramar Team Lola	S +2.0	Lola T600	Ford Cosworth DFV 3.0 V8						SIL; Ret										21st	53
1981	Grid Team Lola	S +2.0	Lola T600	Ford Cosworth DFV 3.0 V8							NÜR; 8		PER; 1	DAY						21st	53
1981	Banco Occidental Ultramar Team Lola	S +2.0	Lola T600	Cosworth DFL 3.3 V8											GLN; Ret	SPA	MOS	ROA	BRH; 1	21st	53
1982	Grid Motor Racing	C	Grid S1	Cosworth DFL 3.3 V8	MNZ; Ret			LMS; Ret	SPA	MUG	FUJ									117th	1
1982	Grid Motor Racing	C	Grid S1	Ford Cosworth DFV 3.0 V8		SIL; Ret	NÜR													117th	1
1982	Grid Motor Racing	C	Grid S1	Cosworth DFL 3.9 V8								BRH; 10								117th	1
1986	John Fitzpatrick Racing	C1	Porsche 956B	Porsche Type 935/79 2.6 F6t	MNZ; 10	SIL; 5	LMS; 4	NOR	BRH; DNS	JER; 8	NÜR; 3	SPA; 11	FUJ							13th	34
1987	Porsche Kremer Racing	C1	Porsche 962C	Porsche Type 935/79 2.8 F6t	JAR; 10	JER; 8	MNZ	SIL	LMS	NOR	BRH	NÜR	SPA	FUJ						47th	4

=== Complete 24 Hours of Le Mans results ===
Year	Team	Co-Drivers	Car	Class	Laps	Pos.	Class Pos.
1981	(United Kingdom) Team Lola	(United Kingdom) Guy Edwards (Spain) Juan Fernández	Lola T600-Ford Cosworth	S +2.0	287	15th	**3rd**
1982	(United Kingdom) Grid Racing	(South Africa) Desiré Wilson (United Kingdom) Alain de Cadenet	Grid Plaza S1-Ford Cosworth	C	7	DNF	DNF
1986	(United Kingdom) John Fitzpatrick Racing	(Spain) Fermín Velez (South Africa) George Fouché	Porsche 956B	C1	349	4th	4th

=== Complete European Formula Two Championship results ===
(key) (Races in bold indicate pole position; races in italics indicate fastest lap)

Year	Entrant	Chassis	Engine	1	2	3	4	5	6	7	8	9	10	11	12	Pos.	Pts
1983	James Gresham Racing	March 832	BMW	SIL; 9	THR	HOC	NÜR	VLL	PAU							NC	0
1983	Minardi Team Srl	Minardi M283	BMW							JAR; 13	DON	MIS	PER	ZOL	MUG	NC	0

== Notes ==
Sporting positions
Preceded by Rupert Keegan	British Formula One Champion; 1980	Succeeded by Jim Crawford (1982)
Preceded by Jorge de Bagration	Campeonato Español de Turismo; 1983	Succeeded by Francisco Romero
