= McLaren M25 =

Race car built in 1973

The McLaren M25 was an open-wheel racing car, designed by John Barnard, and developed and built by British constructor McLaren in 1973. It was based on the successful McLaren M23 Formula One car. It was originally built with the intention to be a Formula 5000 car, but it did not compete in any F5000 races, and didn't even contest in a motor race until 1976, which by that, was too late, since Formula 5000 racing (in its original guise) had folded. It then became a Formula One car for Emilio de Villota, and was equipped with a 3.0 L (180 cu in) Ford-Cosworth DFV V8 engine, where it only entered one World Championship Grand Prix, the 1978 Spanish Grand Prix. de Villota damaged the car in an accident during the practice session for the race, so the team reverted his car back to the M23.
