= Neil Crang =

Australian racing driver

- Nationality: (Australia) Australian
- Born: Neil Robin Crang; December 31, 1949 Melbourne, Victoria, Australia
- Died: July 20, 2020 (aged 70) Melbourne, Victoria, Australia
- Retired: 1988

World Sportscar Championship
- Years active: 1980-1988
- Teams: Angelo Pallavicini; Chevron Cars; Spice Engineering; Cosmik Racing; Team Lee-Davey; Dune Motorsport; Roy Baker Racing
- Starts: 29
- Wins: 0
- Poles: 0
- Fastest laps: 0

Previous series
- 1983, 1985 1982- 1983 1982: Thundersports Series; British Formula Atlantic; Australian Drivers Championship

Awards
- 1985: International Gold Cup

Neil Robin Crang (31 December 1949 – 20 July 2020) was an Australian racing driver. Crang notably competed in the World Sportscar Championship, entering five 24 Hours of Le Mans in the 1980s.

== Racing career ==
Crang began competitively racing after he had moved to Geneva. Crang teamed up with Ian Taylor and Mario Hytten to enter the Brands Hatch 6h, on the calendar of the World Manufacturers’ Championship in 1980. The team finished 15th overall, and third in their Super 2000 category. Later in the year, Crang teamed up with Angela Pallavicini to race his Porsche 934 at the Dijon 1000Kms. They would go on to compete at Daytona, Sebring, Silverstone and Brands Hatch in 1981 along with John Sheldon competed - but failed to finish - the 1981 24 Hours of Le Mans.

Crang competed for two seasons in the British Formula Atlantic championship, notably finishing fourth at the 1982 Macau Grand Prix. Crang in the meantime had acquired a stake in Tiga, the race constructor, and helped create a Group C race car he would compete in a number of races in 1983 with Gordon Spice and Ray Bellm. The three would go on to compete in a full season of the World Sportscar Championship in 1984, winning five races in the Junior Group C category. At the end of the season, Crang left the Tiga team and race sporadically in the championships. He won the 1985 Oulton Park International Gold Cup alongside Tim Lee-Davey. Crang competed in his final race at the 1988 Sandown Park Supersprint 360km driving a Porsche 962 with former teammate Lee-Davey.

== Personal life ==
Crang was born in Melbourne and studied economics and politics at Monash University. He moved to Geneva to work as a grain trader for Cargill. Married to Dianne, Crang had four children Charles, Malcolm, Olivia and Samantha. He died in July 2020 in Melbourne, Australia, after suffering from cancer.

Crang was elected as a member of the British Racing Drivers Club in 1985.

== Racing record ==
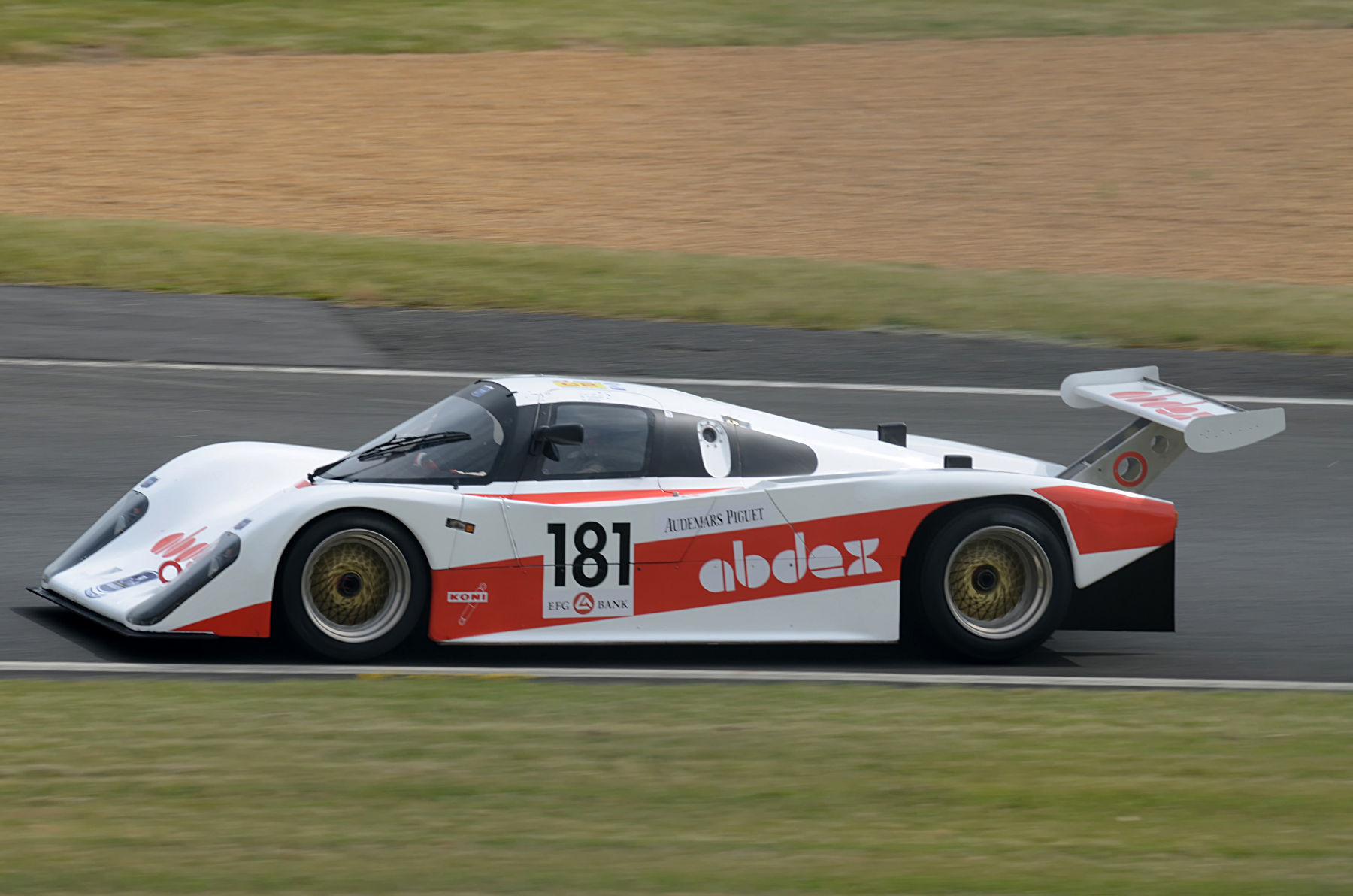
Crang drove the 181 Tiga GC287 at his final 24 Hours of Le Mans in 1987

=== 24 Hours of Le Mans results ===
| Year | Team | Co-Drivers | Car | Class | Laps | Pos. | Class Pos. |
|---|---|---|---|---|---|---|---|
| 1982 | (United Kingdom) Chevron Racing | (Republic of Ireland) Martin Birrane (United Kingdom) John Sheldon | Chevron B36 | Gr.6; S 2.0 | 57 | DNF | DNF |
| 1984 | (United Kingdom) Spice Tiga Racing | (United Kingdom) Gordon Spice (United Kingdom) Ray Bellm | Tiga GC84 | Gr.C2 | 69 | DNF | DNF |
| 1985 | (United Kingdom) Spice Engineering | (United Kingdom) Tim Lee-Davey (United Kingdom) Tony Lanfranchi | Tiga GC84 | Gr.C2 | 226 | NC | NC |
| 1986 | (United Kingdom) Cosmik Racing Promotions | (France) Raymond Touroul (Greece) Costas Los | March 84G | Gr.C1 | 169 | DSQ | DSQ |
| 1987 | (United Kingdom) Dune Motorsport | (Switzerland) Jean Kruker (United Kingdom) Duncan Bain | Tiga GC287 | Gr.C2 | 260 | DNF | DNF |
