= Porsche 956 =

Group C sports-prototype racing car

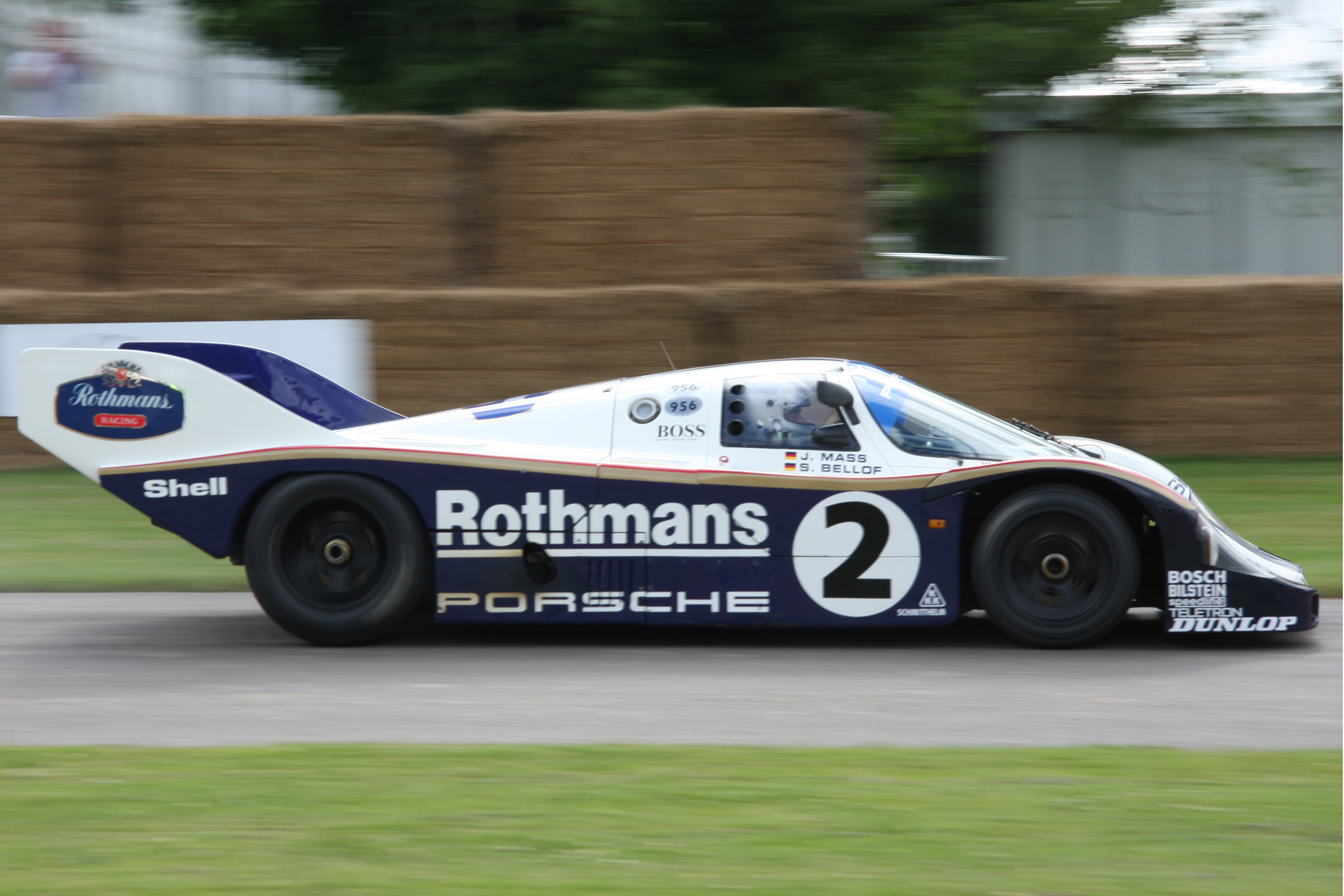
- The factory-run Rothmans-sponsored 956 of Jochen Mass and Stefan Bellof.
- Category: Group C
- Constructor: Porsche
- Designer: Norbert Singer
- Predecessor: Porsche 936
- Successor: Porsche 962

Technical specifications
- Chassis: Aluminum monocoque
- Engine: 2.65 litre Porsche Type-935 turbocharged Flat-6
- Transmission: 5-speed manual

Competition history
- Debut: 1982 Silverstone Circuit

The Porsche 956 was a Group C sports-prototype racing car designed by Norbert Singer and built by Porsche in 1982 for the FIA World Sportscar Championship. It was later upgraded to the 956B in 1984. In 1983, driven by Stefan Bellof, this car established a record that would stand for 35 years, lapping the famed 20.832 km (12.93 mi) Nürburgring Nordschleife in 6:11.13 during qualifying for the 1000 km Sports Car race. The record was finally surpassed by Timo Bernhard in a derestricted Porsche 919 Evo on 29 June 2018.

== Development ==
Built to comply with the championship's new Group C regulations which were introduced in 1982, the car was a replacement for Porsche's successful 936 model which competed in the previous Group 6 category of the World Championship. The project began in June 1981, and the first prototype chassis was completed on March 27, 1982, in time for the beginning of the World Championship season. Jürgen Barth tested the first chassis at Porsche's private test track.

The 956 features a chassis made of an aluminium monocoque, a first for the company, helping to allow the car to meet the 800 kg (1,764 lb) weight minimum in Group C. The engine is the same as the one used in the Porsche 936/81, the Type-935 2.65 L turbocharged Flat-6, producing approximately 635 hp (474 kW) (originally developed as an Indycar engine; hence the cubic capacity used).

An improved chassis with better fuel efficiency from a Bosch Motronic electric system was developed for 1984, being termed the 956B. In total, twenty-eight 956s would be built by Porsche from 1982 to 1984, with an unofficial 29th chassis built from spare parts by Richard Lloyd Racing. The 956 was also the first Porsche to have ground effect aerodynamics. As a comparison, the ground effects Porsche 956 produced over three times as much downforce as the older model Porsche 917 that raced over a decade earlier.

In 1983, 956 chassis #107 was used by Porsche as a testbed for their P01 Formula One engine, later badged as TAG and used exclusively by McLaren. The car was able to test some of the characteristics of a Formula One car in order to develop the engine. The engine became highly successful in F1, and while never the most powerful on the grid, between 1984 and 1987, the turbocharged TAG-Porsche would win 25 Grands Prix and help McLaren to two Constructors and three World Driver's Championships. As of the 2012 German Grand Prix, the TAG-Porsche engine sits in 7th place on the list of F1 race winning engines.

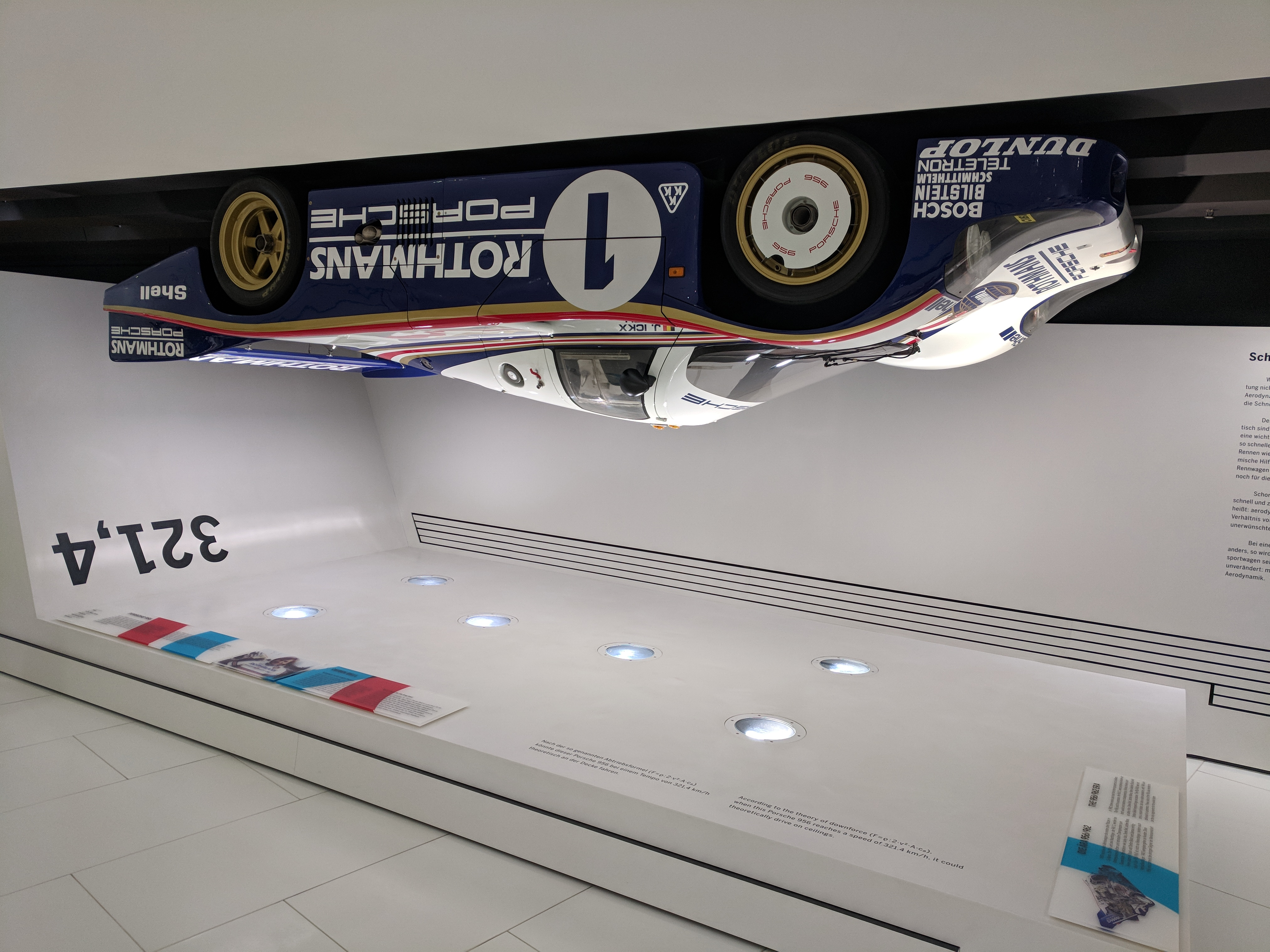
The Porsche 956 mounted upside down at the Porsche Museum to symbolize its legendary downforce.

Porsche tested its Porsche Doppelkupplungsgetriebe (PDK) dual-clutch transmission in the 956 in the early 1980s. PDK would be used in the Porsche 962, and would eventually make its way into production Porsches with the 2009 997 Carrera and Carrera S.

The Porsche 956 also appeared with two different rear wing designs. The cars were fitted with a larger, high downforce rear wing for most events. For the Circuit de la Sarthe at Le Mans however where top speed on the almost 6 km (4 mi) long Mulsanne Straight was essential, the 956 was fitted with a much lower and smaller 'low drag' wing to enable the cars to reach speeds of around 225 mph (362 km/h). Some of the privateer teams would also experiment with a front wing attached to the cars at the tighter circuits in an effort to increase front downforce, but wind tunnel testing eventually found that these wings were disrupting the airflow over the car and actually increased the aerodynamic drag making the cars slower in a straight line. Notably, the factory backed Rothmans Porsche team did not make use of the smaller front wings. Many attributed this to the fact that the Rothmans cars used a one piece body undertray which helped increase the downforce generated by the ground effect aerodynamics while the customer 956's used a twin undertray which disrupted the air flow and slightly decreased the downforce.

The 956 would be officially replaced by the Porsche 962 in 1985, an evolution in the 956's design.

== Racing history ==
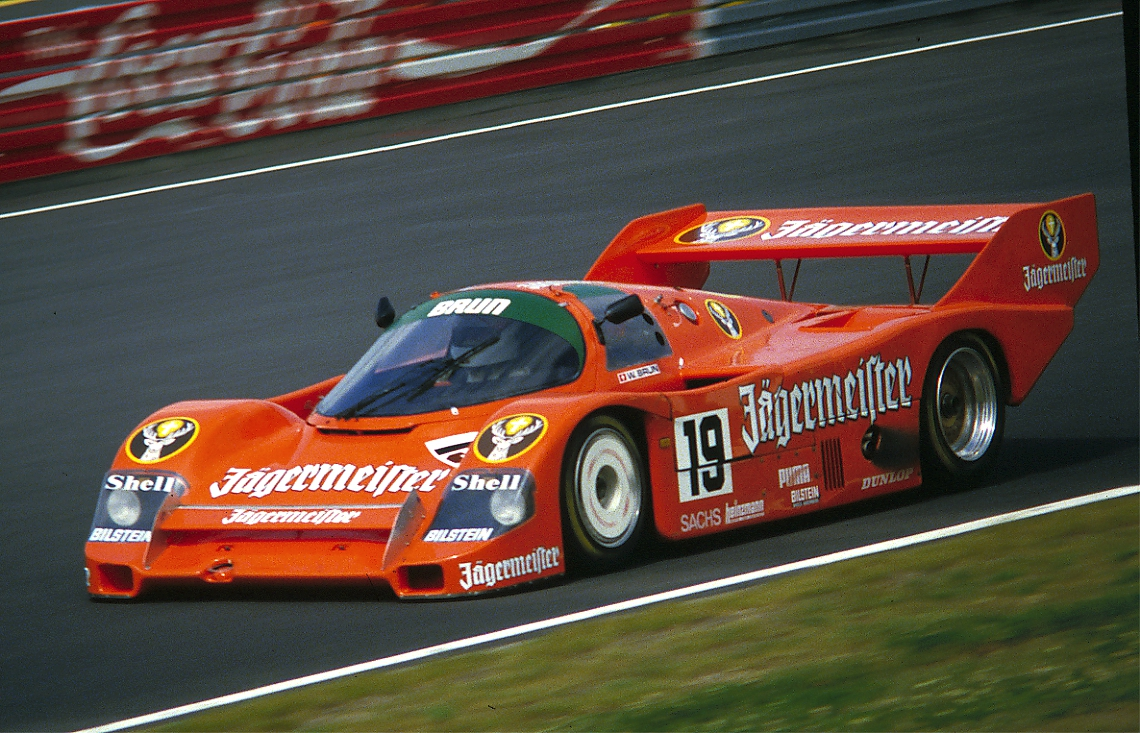
Jägermeister sponsored 956 run by privateer Brun Motorsport.

The 956 made its debut at the Silverstone 6 Hour race, the second round of the World Championship for Makes with Jacky Ickx and Derek Bell driving for the factory. After missing the following round at the 1000 km Nürburgring for developmental reasons, the Ickx/Bell unit reappeared at the 24 Hours of Le Mans. They led the race for the entire 24 hours, eventually taking the overall win - their third win together. As they had already won in 1981 with a Porsche 936 that had used an early version of the 956 engine, their car had started number 1. The two other factory 956 followed them, so the three factory Porsches finished 1-2-3 in the order of their starting numbers.

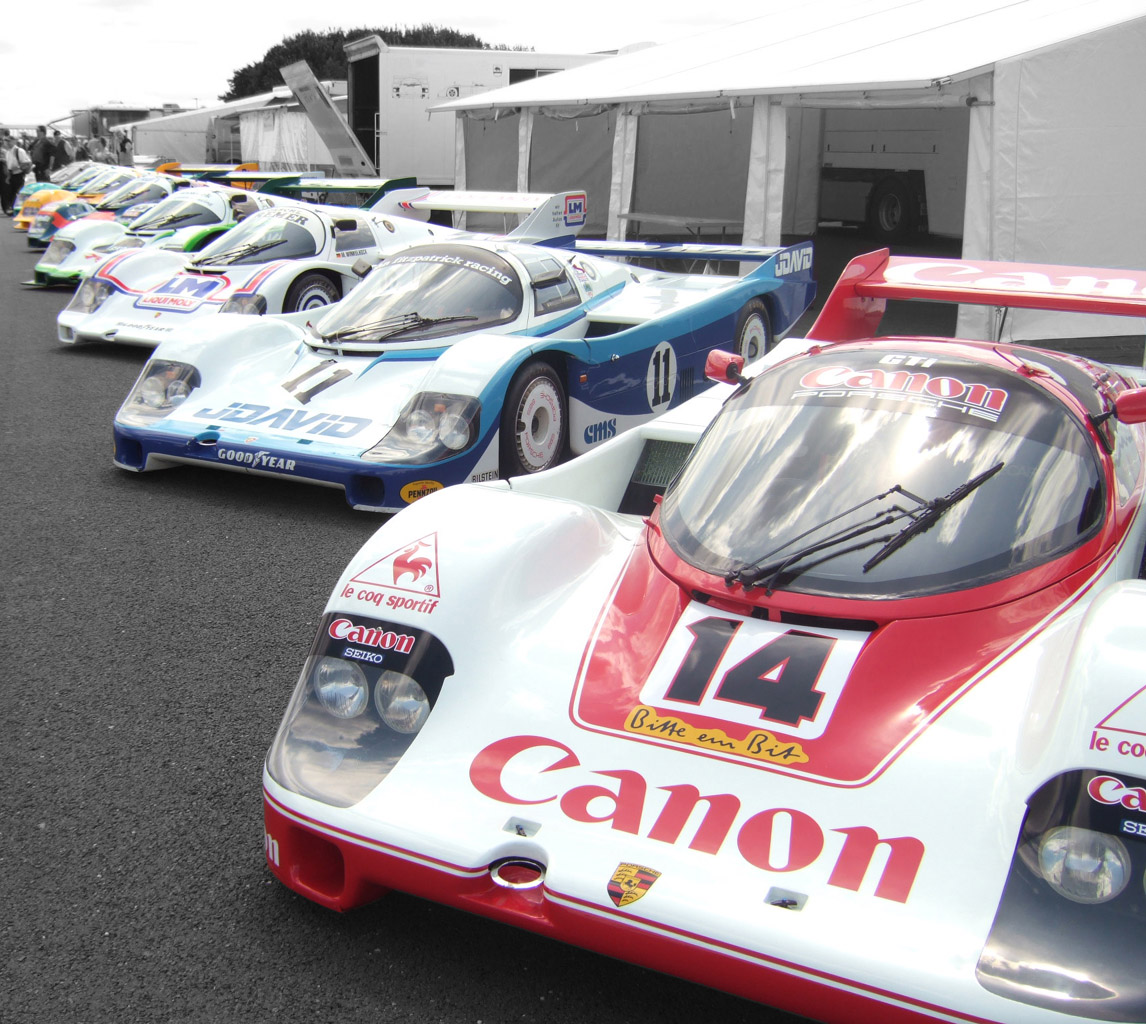
Four customer Porsche 956s.

Boosted by this success, Porsche sold customer versions of the 956 to privateer teams such as Joest Racing, Obermaier Racing, John Fitzpatrick Racing, Richard Lloyd Racing, Kremer Racing and Brun Motorsport who raced them independently of the factory.

Porsche 956B

The overall all-time lap record for the demanding 20 km Nürburgring-Nordschleife circuit in the Eifel Mountains was achieved during the qualifying session for the 1983 1000km of Nürburgring, by Stefan Bellof, who drove his 956 around in 6 minutes 11.13 seconds, at an average speed of 202 km/h (126 mph). The race lap record is held by the same Bellof, during the 1983 1000 km Nürburgring, the lap being clocked at 6:25.91.

At the 1985 1000 km of Spa, Bellof died after his Brun Motorsport's 956 collided with the factory team's newer 962 that being driven by Jacky Ickx. Safety concerns over the 956 led to its eventual end as teams upgraded to the safer 962. The 956's last win would come courtesy of Joest Racing in the last race of the 1986 WEC season, in what also turned out to be the 956's last race.

Awards
| Preceded by Inaugural | Autosport; Racing Car Of The Year; 1982 | Succeeded by Brabham BT52 |
