= 1984 24 Hours of Le Mans =

52nd 24 Hours of Le Mans endurance race

Previous: 1983	Next: 1985
Index: Races | Winners

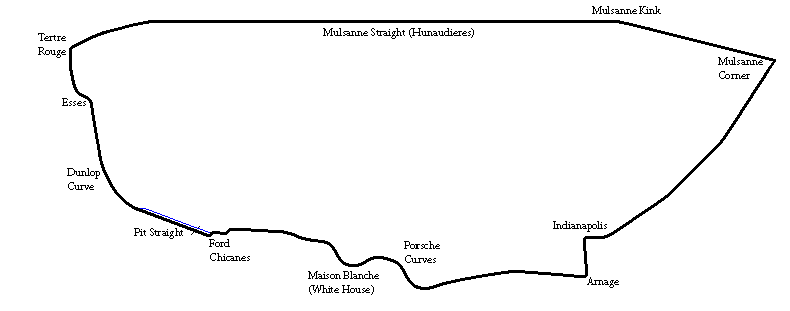
Le Mans in 1984

The 1984 24 Hours of Le Mans was the 52nd Grand Prix of Endurance, and took place on 16 – 17 June 1984. It was also the third round of the 1984 World Endurance Championship. There were two big stories going into the race weekend: the absence of the Porsche works team and their drivers, and the return of Jaguar. Bob Tullius had commissioned the new Jaguar XJR-5 to run in the IMSA series and entered two for Le Mans. Earlier in the year, FISA had announced abrupt changes to the fuel regulations to bring them more in line with IMSA. Porsche and Lancia objected strongly because of their strong investment in the existing rules. In the absence of dominant Porsche works team, the race was left wide open between Lancia and the number of strong Porsche customer teams.

Run in excellent weather, it was a race of excitement and tragedy. Lancia had qualified 1–2 on pole but from the start it was a hotly contested event. The lead changed fifteen times in the first 50 laps, as a half-dozen cars jostled for the lead with close racing that thrilled the spectators. This group did not include the Joest Porsche of former winners Henri Pescarolo and Klaus Ludwig, who had been badly delayed by fuel-pressure issues in the first hour and were down in 30th position. The previous fragility of the Lancias was not apparent and going into the night Bob Wollek's Lancia held a narrow lead. It was at 9:15pm, as dusk was falling, that the most serious accident of the race occurred. The two Nimrod-Aston Martins were travelling in line astern on the Hunaudières Straight when John Sheldon's leading car suddenly veered off the road at the Mulsanne kink leading up to the hairpin. Hitting the Armco barrier, it ricocheted violently across the track into the fencing on the other side and burst into flames. In avoiding the disintegrating car, his team-mate also hit the barrier. A track marshal, Jacky Loiseau, was killed by flying debris and another seriously injured. Sheldon was airlifted to hospital with serious burns. After an hour behind safety cars to allow repairs to be done, the race resumed. The Lancias soon established themselves 1–2 at the head of the field ahead of the pursuing pack of Porsches.

The race was also notable for the very large numbers of mechanical incidents with almost no car left unaffected and without a delay. It also meant no car was able to establish a dominant lead. Everything changed around breakfast time on Sunday. Having led through the night, the Wollek/Nannini Lancia had a long stop to fix its gearbox and the JFR Porsche in second pitted running on five cylinders. This all left the Pescarolo/Ludwig Porsche in the lead after charging back up the field after their initial delay. The American Porsche of Preston Henn was second, one of the few that had had a smooth run through the race. It stayed fairly static at the front for the rest of the race, with Pescarolo getting his fourth Le Mans outright victory, and Ludwig his second. The ailing JFR Porsche held on for third, while Wollek took the Lancia out in the last quarter-hour to come home eighth, the first non-Porsche finisher. Winner of the C2 Class was the Lola-Mazda sponsored by the BF Goodrich tyre company, while neither of the Jaguars finished although they had run in the top-10 for most of the race. Such was the attrition the winners distance was 11 laps fewer than that of the 1983 winner. It was also the biggest comeback in the race by a team after an early-race delay.

== Regulations ==
In March 1984, just before the start of the season and only months before the race, the sport's governing body FISA (Fédération Internationale du Sport Automobile) announced that IMSA classes would be eligible for the World Championship. Hence the minimum weight rose 50 kg to 850 kg to accommodate them. It also stated that the fuel-formula at the heart of the Group C regulations would be scrapped in 1985, in favour of IMSA's system of sliding weight-scale to balance engine capacity. The works teams (essentially Porsche and Lancia) were furious after the considerable investment they had put into developing fuel-efficient engines (and engine-management systems), forecasting it would lead to a spiralling contest for more power over weight. In response FISA agreed to review the decision. Therefore, the Automobile Club de l'Ouest (ACO) was obliged to admit entries from the IMSA series. The GTP class was very similar to Group C. Its biggest engines were linked to a minimum weight of 900 kg. Only a single turbo was allowed and there were different rules regarding aerodynamics. Safety measures such as a steel rollcage and having footpedals behind the front suspension were further differences. For Le Mans, their usual 120-litre fuel tanks had to be exchanged for the 100-litre ones as used by Group C.

Meanwhile, the Group C Junior class was renamed Group C2, and the senior class became Group C1. The ACO kept the 25-lap limit on oil-replenishment. However, a simple fuel-counter mechanism allowed teams to track their fuel consumption, thereby removing the need for a mandatory number of pit-stops, when there was a set total volume (2600 litres) per car for the race. This did encourage teams to try alternative fuel strategies to gain an advantage. The C2 class were now fitted with 100-litre fuel-tanks but kept their reduced fuel allowance. They also had to comply to the IMSA requirement to fit the pedals behind the line of the front axle.

== Entries ==
In light of the FISA pronouncement, the Rothmans Porsche works team chose to boycott Le Mans. This made it the first since Porsche's debut in 1951 that a works team would not be present. Despite the open invitation to IMSA competitors, very few actually took it up, with only eleven entries submitted. However, of those, a significant drawcard was the return of Jaguar to Le Mans after over 20 years. Group C was flourishing, filling up over half the field. Overall, around 25 cars could be classed as works entries from manufacturers and small constructors, or with direct factory support.

Class	Quantity	Turbo/Rotary engines
Group C1	36 / 29	25 / 21
IMSA-GTP	4 / 4	2 / 2
Group C2	14 / 11	7 / 6
Group B	8 / 5	4 / 2
IMSA-GTX	3 / 1	0 / 0
IMSA-GTO	5 / 3	2 / 2
Total Entries	70 / 53	38 / 33

- Note: The first number is the number accepted, the second the number who started.

=== Group C1 and GTP ===
In the absence of the works team, and their contracted drivers, the onus of success instead fell on the customer teams. The race-winning model from last year was available for sale now – with its revised suspension and including the Bosch Motronic engine-management system. Now called the 956B, one each was picked up by the three leading teams – Joest, Kremer and JFR (John Fitzpatrick Racing). Walter Brun, moving on from the unsuccessful Sehcar project snared a fourth. Along with the older models there were fully 16 cars in the entry list, making Porsche still a strong favourite for the win. Many of the older cars were being retrofitted by their teams with the Motronic system. Joest Racing had two cars entered, sponsored by the New Man jeans company. They had enticed three-time winner Henri Pescarolo and 1979 winner Klaus Ludwig to join the team and they were given the 956B. The older 956 would be run by young F1 driver Stefan Johansson, Jean-Louis Schlesser and wealthy Colombian flower-merchant Mauricio de Narvaez. Dieter Schornstein had bought Joest's other 956 (that had finished 4th in 1983). Volkert Merl, who had driven it then, was again on the crew, along with Louis Krages on debut (who ran under the pseudonym "John Winter").

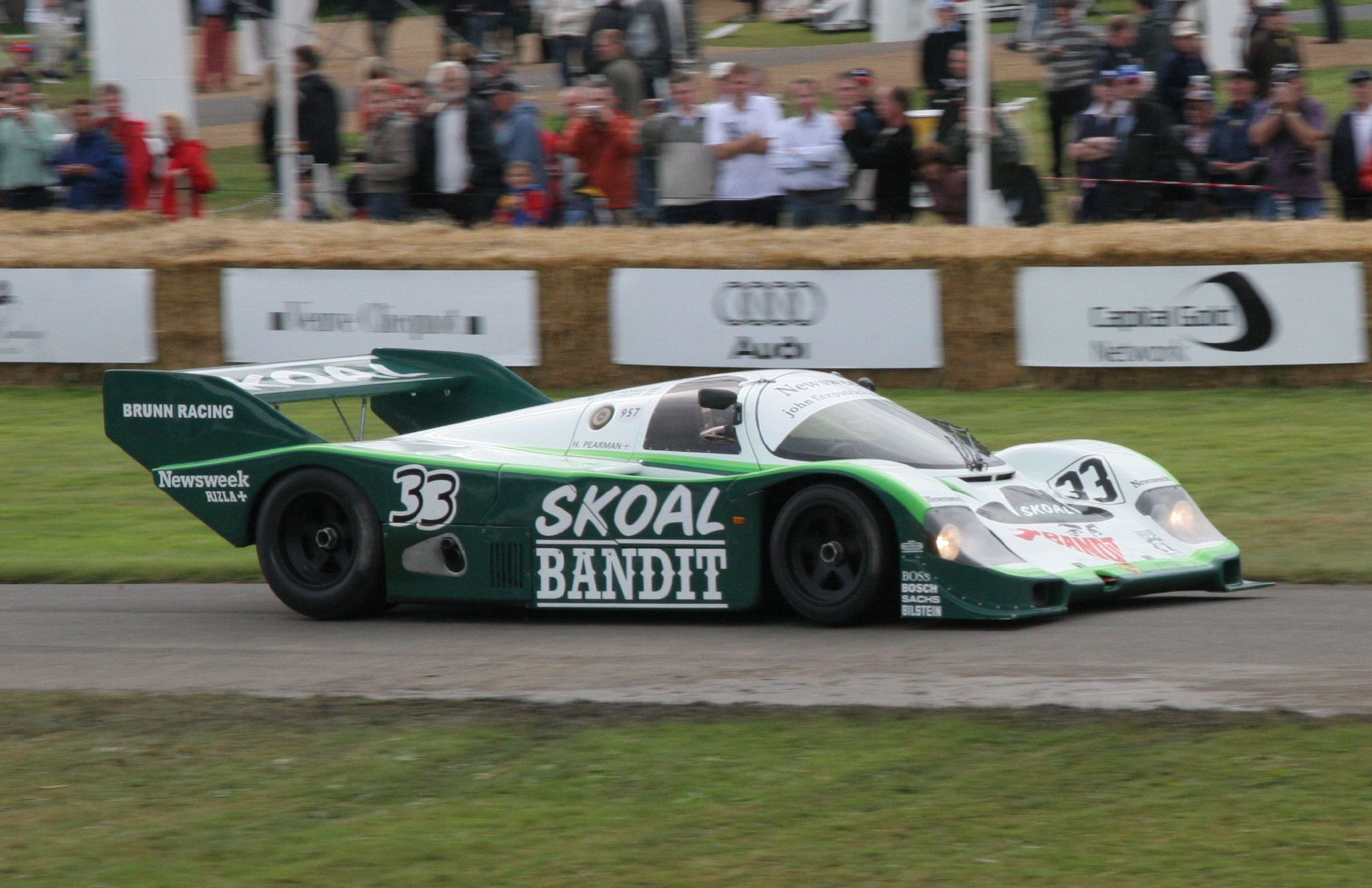
Porsche 956 of John Fitzpatrick Racing

Porsche Kremer Racing likewise had two cars entered. The 956B had 1983-winner Vern Schuppan (not a contracted Porsche works-driver this year, hence not covered by the boycott). He was joined by fellow-Australian Alan Jones and Jean-Pierre Jarier, both of whom had left F1 this year. Their other 956 was the car that had finished third for Kremer the year before. Tiff Needell / David Sutherland / Rusty French would be its drivers this year.

Meanwhile, Porsche had been developing a car for the IMSA series as the 956 was ineligible from its pedal placement. The Porsche 962 had a longer wheelbase, for the pedals to fit behind the axle for the American GTP class. It was fitted with a 2.9-litre single-turbo engine. Two of the first customers were Preston Henn's Swap Shop team and John Fitzpatrick's Skoal Bandit team, who both brought their cars to Le Mans. Fitzpatrick instead chose to fit a standard Porsche 2.65-litre engine, as used in the 956, and entered it in Group C1. This year, he stayed in the pits as team-manager, giving the driving duties to Guy Edwards, Rupert Keegan and debutante Roberto Moreno. A second JFR car was also entered – a brand new 956B, for David Hobbs/Philippe Streiff/Sarel van der Merwe. He also supported the entry from Team Australia, loaning them the 956 that had run the previous year. It would be driven by Bathurst champions Peter Brock and Larry Perkins. Henn raced his 962 in the GTP class. His first-choice drivers were unavailable: A. J. Foyt (family matters) and Hurley Haywood (leg injury) so he instead he got Michel Ferté and Edgar Dören to drive with him. Henn also had a second Porsche in the C1 class, to be driven by previous race-winner Jean Rondeau alongside John Paul Jnr.

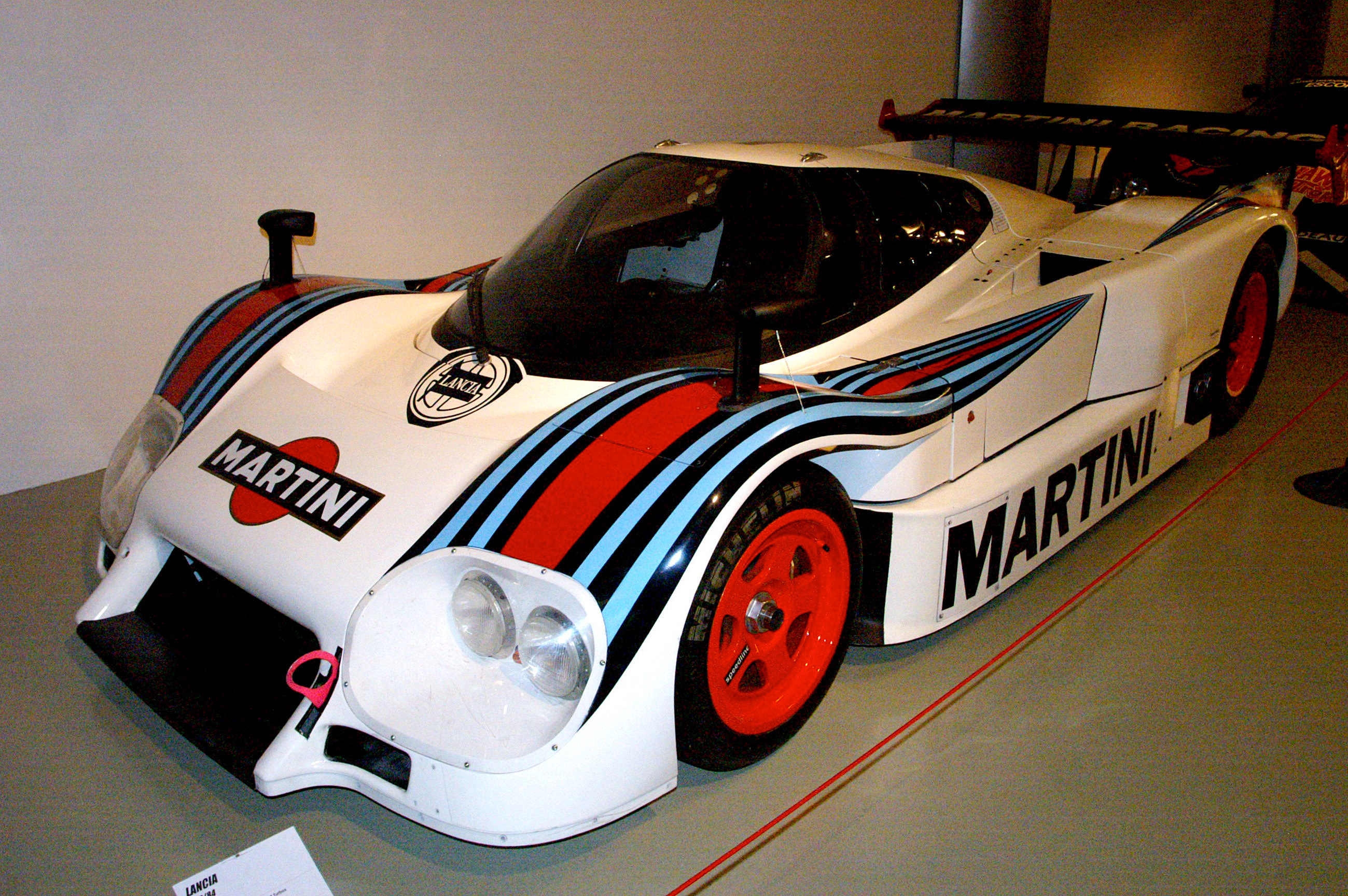
Lancia LC284

Walter Brun had ended his partnership with Seger & Hoffmann and Brun Motorsport purchased both a 956B and a 956 with the uprated Motronic engine-system. Brun himself raced the new car, with American Bob Akin and German Prinz Leopold von Bayern. The second car had the regular championship pairing of Oscar Larrauri and Massimo Sigala, with Joël Gouhier joining for a one-off drive. Richard Lloyd's GTi Engineering had expanded to a two-car team, with his Canon sponsorship. The lead car was driven by pro-drivers Jonathon Palmer and Jan Lammers, and the team had done their own development work to improve its aerodynamics. The other car was the ex-works one that Stefan Bellof had crashed at the Nürburgring the previous year. Lloyd ran it as a camera-car, and brought in Dakar Rally winner René Metge and Pink Floyd drummer Nick Mason as co-drivers. The large field of 16 Group C/GTP Porsches was rounded out with the German Jürgen Lässig/Hans Obermeier car and a new car for the Charles Ivey team stepping up to the main class.

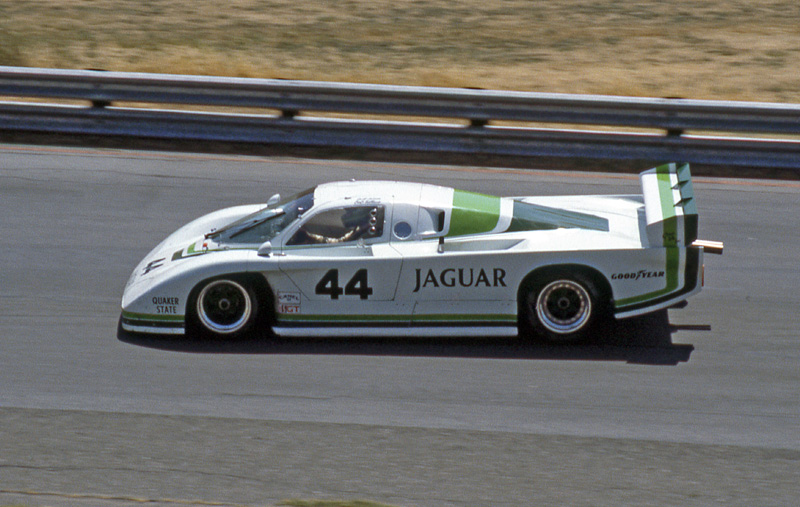
Jaguar XJR-5 of Group 44 Racing

Without the Porsche works team, Lancia saw its best opportunity to win. The Ferrari V8 engine had been bored out from 2.6 to 3.0-litres, tied with electronic engine management from Magneti Marelli. They also had new Abarth gearboxes installed. The LC2 was very fast – able to reach over 350 kp/h (220 mph) on the straights. Team principal Cesare Fiorio had enticed Bob Wollek away from the Porsche teams, with up-and-coming F2 driver Alessandro Nannini. The other team car was driven by Mauro Baldi/Hans Heyer/Paolo Barilla. A third car, driven by Pierluigi Martini/Beppe Gabbiani/Xavier Lapeyre, was not in Martini livery but in the yellow of the Malardeau-sponsored Jolly Club team.

Many of the pre-race headlines were trumpeting the return to Le Mans of the Jaguar brand. It was not a works effort but came from American Bob Tullius and his Group 44 Racing team from the IMSA series, that had finished second in the 1983 championship. The XJR-5 was designed by Lee Dykstra, with a 5.3-litre Jaguar V12 engine. The cars were constructed at Dave Klym's Fabcar Engineering workshop. The Kevlar-carbonfibre composite body was tested in wind-tunnels and the car was deliberately built with a Group C-compatible floor to allow the cars to meet Tullius' aim to take them to Le Mans. Two cars arrived in the GTP-class, now fitted with 6.0-litre fuel-injected engines that could put out 650 bhp. Not wanting to stress the engines, the drivers stayed off full revs, but could reach 340 kp/h (210 mph). The team had a very experienced multinational line-up with Tullius driving with Doc Bundy and British veteran Brian Redman in his car, while F1 driver John Watson, French GT champion Claude Ballot-Léna and Tony Adamowicz (who had last raced at Le Mans in 1972 with an NART Ferrari) were in the other.

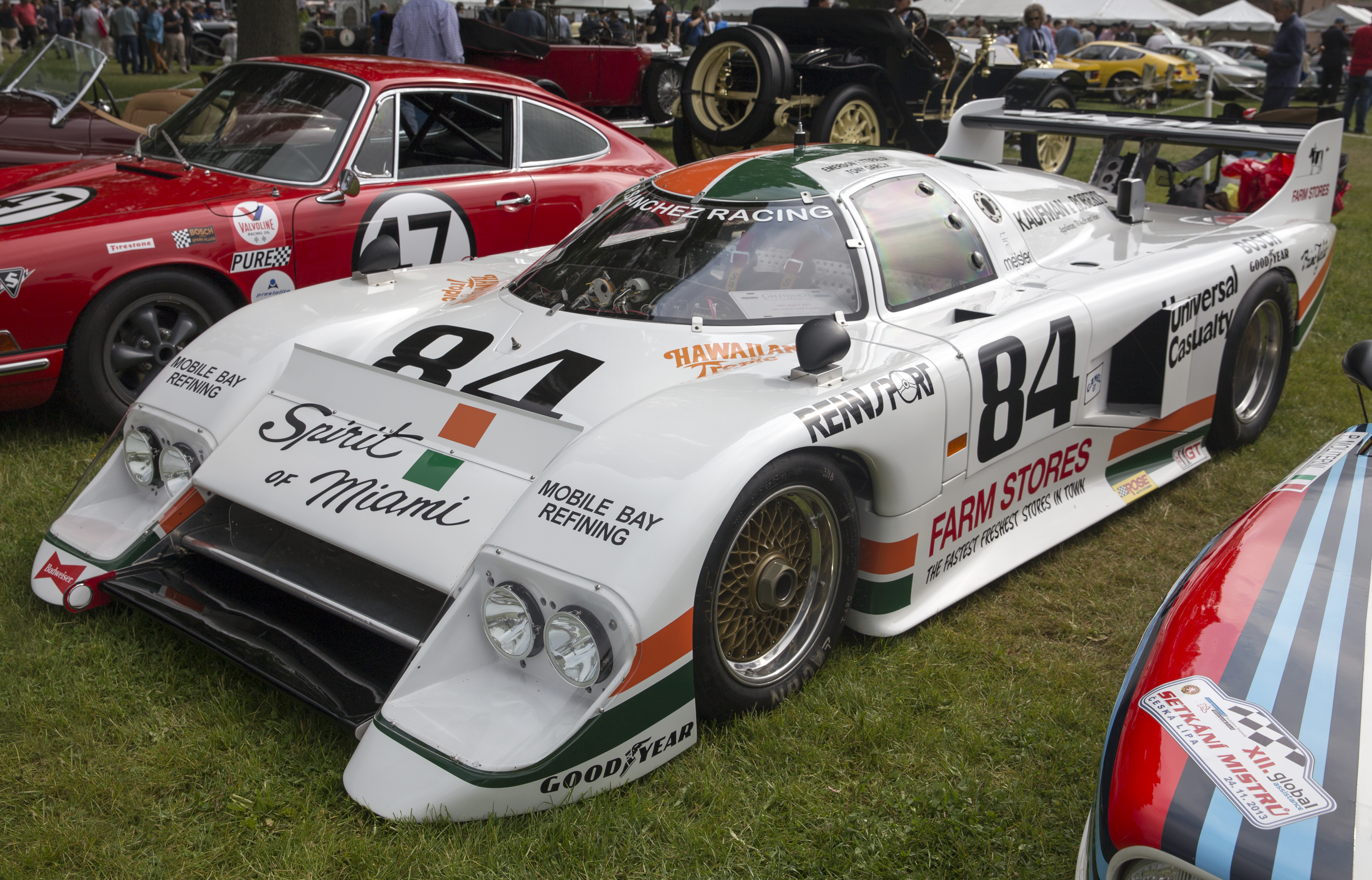
March 83G

The other entry in the GTP class was from March North America. Al Holbert's team had won the 1983 IMSA GT Championship with the 83G, powered by a Chevrolet engine. Tracing its lineage back to the BMW-March project from 1980, the 83G and it successor, the 84G, were dominating the current IMSA season supported by March North America. One of those cars, co-operated in the US by Pegasus Racing and Davidson Racing. This car was powered by a turbo Buick V6 engine prepared by McLaren Engines. Boosted up to 700 bhp, it could achieve impressive straight-line speed, reaching 355 kp/h (220 mph). This was tempered though by driving abilities of the amateur team of Madren/Speer/Pickering.

After a strong racing history, Jean Rondeau's company had now gone into liquidation. The owner had gone to Daytona to tout for drivers to come to Le Mans and race his cars. While there, he also landed himself a pay-drive with Preston Henn's team. Meanwhile, the remnants of the Rondeau team prepared an M482 for Americans Walt Bohren and Jim Mullen, with works driver Alain Ferté on hand for local knowledge. Two regular Rondeau privateers, Christian Bussi and Pierre Yver returned with their older M382s. Yver carried #50 for the 50th anniversary of his ongoing energy sponsor Primagaz. The small WM team continued its development of their P83 model. The P83B was wider, with improved brakes and cooling. They went back to the 2.65-litre V6 Peugeot engine, but still able to put out 650 bhp in qualifying mode. This all made the small WM the fastest car on the track, reaching over 360 kp/h (225 mph). Le Mans resident Yves Courage debuted his new Cougar C02, built on the industrial park bedside the circuit. Designed by Marcel Hubert (who had designed the winning Renault in 1978), it had a longer tail, improved suspension and a new cooling system, the 3.3-litre DFL was race-tuned by Heini Mader's Swiss team. Without regular team-mate, Alain de Cadenet (driving with the Charles Ivey team), Courage and Michel Dubois brought in American John Jellinek as the third driver.

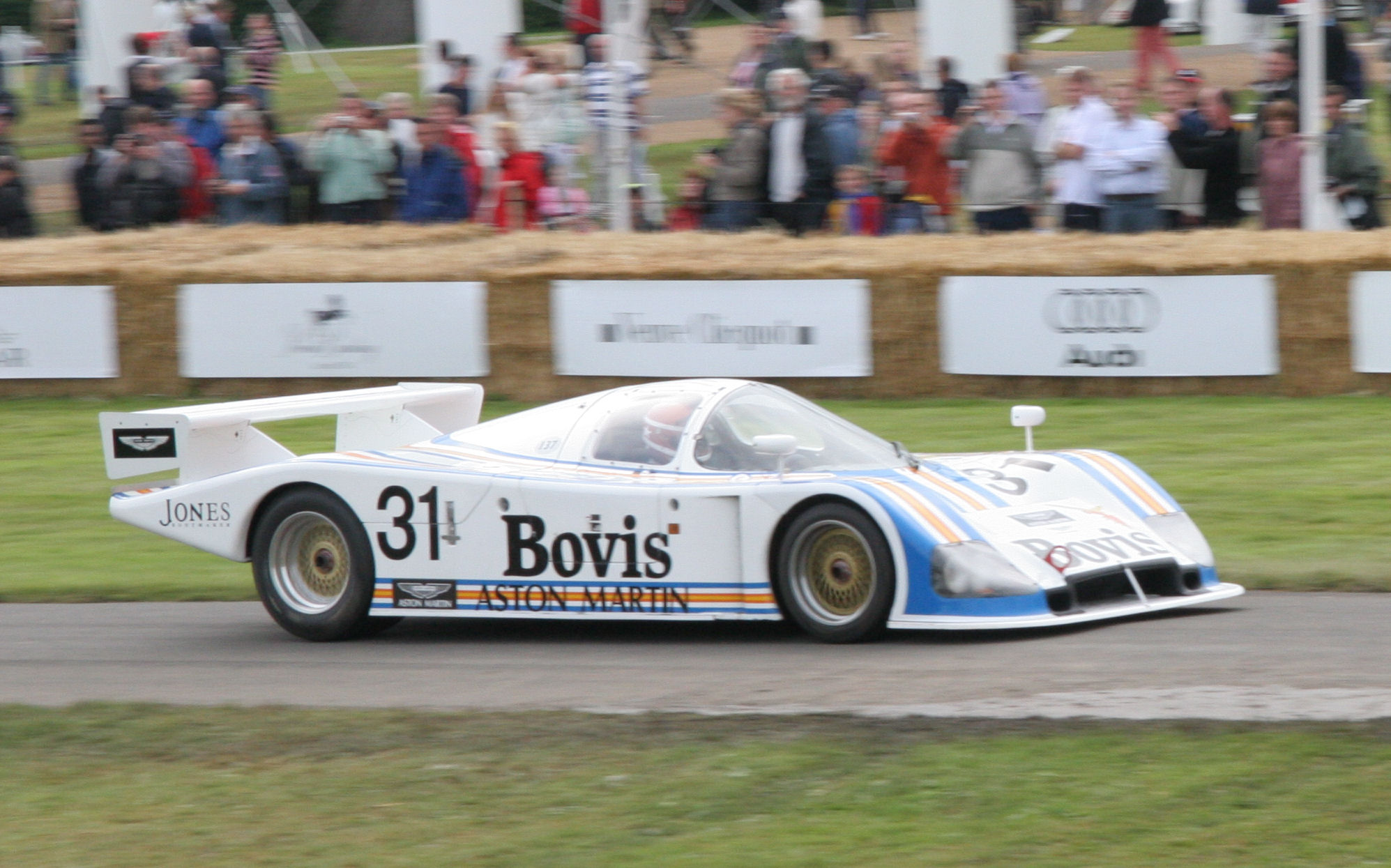
Nimrod NRA/C2

For Nimrod-Aston Martin, the 1983 foray into IMSA had been ruinously expensive with poor results. The company folded and the plans for a turbo-powered model were cancelled. The assets were purchased, briefly, by John Cooper until passed on to Viscount Downe (an Aston Martin shareholder and president of the owners' club), who had previously run a privateer Nimrod. This year's derivation had improved aerodynamics, developed by the Ray Mallock Ltd high-performance company. This improved the top speed to 340 kp/h (215 mph). Mallock himself raced one car with Drake Olson, son of the American Aston Martin distributor and the experienced British trio of John Sheldon, Mike Salmon and Richard Attwood (1970 winner).

The works Dome team returned with their new RC83, with a streamlined aerodynamic chassis. Works drivers were the two Swedes Eje Elgh and Stanley Dickens. A second Dome, entered by Dorset Racing was an older RC82i put onto a narrower chassis. The original Grid car had raced in the past two Le Mans. A second chassis was finished and entered this year by the busy Charles Ivey team for its owner Dudley Wood. They were one of the first teams to do the obvious, and take the very successful 2649cc turbocharged engine from the Porsche 956 and fit it to different chassis. Despite being bored out to 2856cc, the S2 was one of the heaviest Group C cars in the field. Wood and his regular co-drivers John Cooper and Barry Robinson had already taken the car for races in IMSA and the Silverstone WEC round.

=== Group C2 ===
Mazda continued its programme in the junior C2 class. The works team, Mazdaspeed, brought two cars of the latest development of the 717C chassis by its in-house division, Mooncraft. The new 727C still had the screaming hi-rev 320 bhp Mazda 13B twin-rotary engine but the better aerodynamics made it easier to drive. Regular works-drivers Yojiro Terada and Takashi Yorino were joined by Pierre Dieudonné, while the other European works-driver, Irishman David Kennedy raced with the Belgian Martin brothers, Jean-Michel and Philippe. In 1982, Jim Busby and the BF Goodrich tyre company had won its class in a Porsche 924 fitted with their standard high-performance road-tyres. This year, they commissioned Lola to design a new car, based on the current T610. With the same Mazda rotary engine as the works cars, it could get up to 275 kp/h (175 mph). Ballast was needed to bring it over the 700 kg minimum weight and ran with the Goodrich high-performance tyres. The cars had performed very well at Daytona before being shipped across to Europe, where Busby took the class victory at Monza. Busby ran one of the cars, while Mazda gave the customer team Yoshimi Katayama, one of their test drivers, to lead the other car.

Alba Engineering had won four Championship races in the 1983 season, run by the Jolly Club team principals Martino Finotto and Carlo Facetti. They proceeded to build a second car. Finotto enlarged the turbo-engine to 1980cc, and it was now capable of 330 kp/h (205 mph) and up to 500 bhp in practice. They were at a disadvantage, by still being fitted with 85-litre fuel cells when the new C2 cars had 100-litre cells. Finotto, Facetti and Vanoli again ran the lead car together, while Coppelli/Pavia/Daccò raced the other car which had taken the class-win at the round before Le Mans, at Silverstone.

As well as the Rondeau cars in the C1-class, a 4-year old M379C was modified and entered in C2. It had been purchased by the new Graff Racing team (the name a combination of the owners Jean-Philippe Grand and François Feymann). All the Rondeau engines were tuned by Heini Mader. Sponsorship was raised by selling 50 lottery tickets for £1000 to choose the racing livery. The winning design was that of Barclays, as used by the Arrows F1 team. Tiga Race Cars had been founded in the 1970s by antipodeans Tim Schenken and Howden Ganley, with a successful series of cars in the 2-litre Sports car classes. Australian Neil Crang commissioned Tiga's first Group C car, the GC83, was only completed with a Chevrolet V8 late in the past season, racing for Spice Engineering with team-owners Gordon Spice and Ray Bellm. Spice then modified the design, as the new GC84, to incorporate the 3.3-litre Cosworth VFL engine instead and give it a nose akin to that of the Porsche 956. A second car, a GC284, was one of two built based on the old S2000 car and fitted with a Cosworth BDT rally engine. The 1778cc turbocharged engine could put out 380 bhp. It was entered by British privateer Roy Baker and his JQF Engineering team.

Overshadowed by the return of Jaguar, another famous name from the same period re-appeared. The Scottish Ecurie Ecosse team was reborn by a business group led by Hugh McCaig. Buying Alain DeCadenet's 1977 Group 6 sports car, they used it as the basis for a new aerodynamic C2 bodyshell. The Ecosse C284 still carried the 3-litre Cosworth DFV which could get the car up to 315 kp/h (195 mph). Just after the car was finished, FISA updated the C2 fuel capacity to 100 litres, necessitating the team to squeeze extra capacity into the side-pods. Regular season drivers Mike Wilds/David Duffield was joined by David Leslie for this race.

ADA Engineering had bought the De Cadenet-Lola they had modified for François Duret. Renamed the ADA 01, the team refined the bodywork further and updated the Cosworth engine to a 3.3-litre DFL. In various incarnations, the chassis was now entered for its ninth Le Mans.

=== Group B, GTX and GTO ===
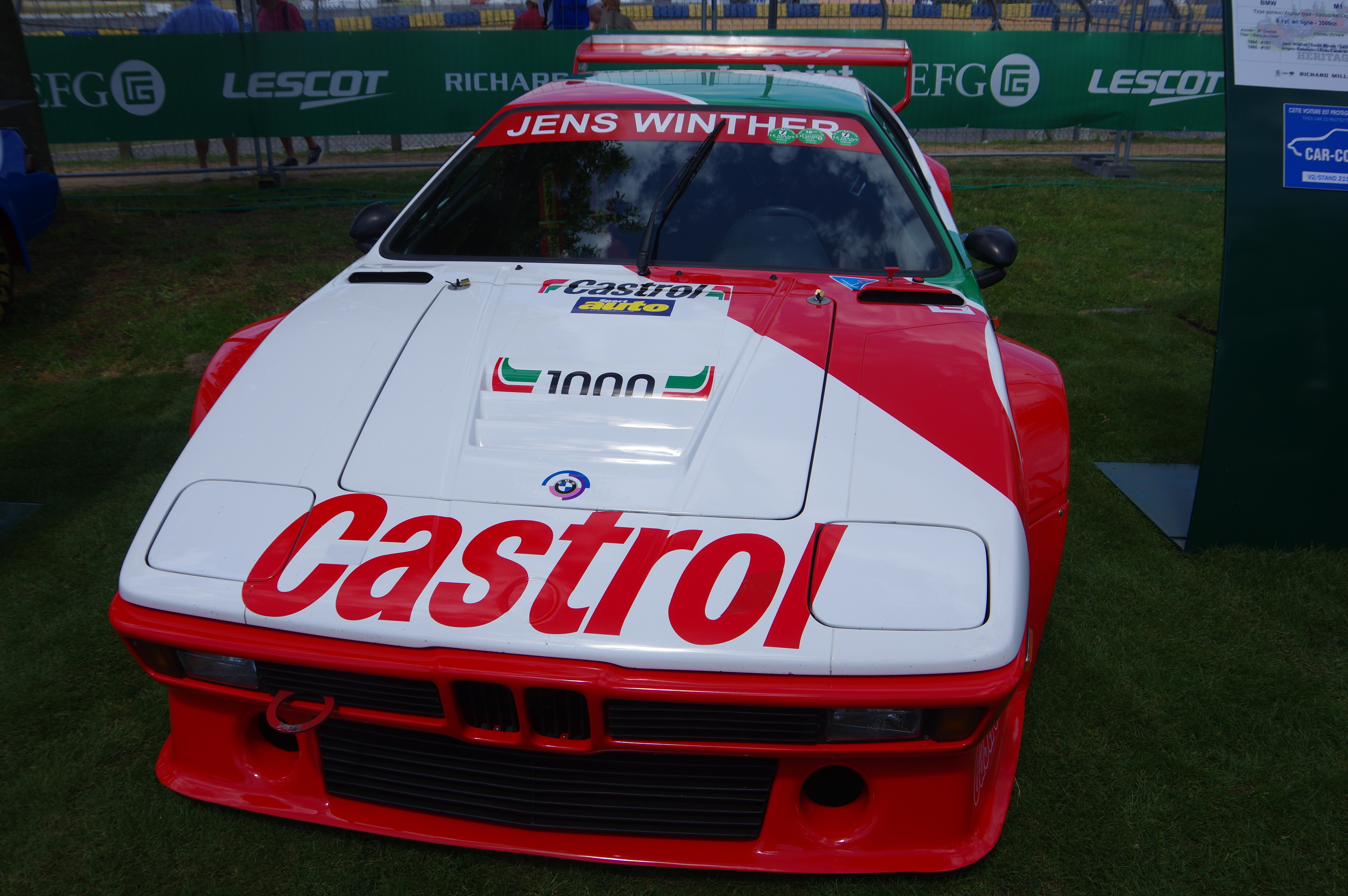
Team Castrol Denmark BMW M1

The GT classes were split between Group B and the IMSA GTO, with an entry list composed of experienced privateers. The withdrawal of the Camaros of the American Stratagraph team meant it was, once again, going to be a contest between Porsche and BMW. In Group B, the BMW M1 had won the opening rounds and two cars arrived to take on the Porsches. Jens Winther and his Team Castrol Denmark had the victory at Monza, and German Helmut Gall entered his as the French BMW-Bayonne team.

Against them was Claude Haldi (in his 17th Le Mans) and Michel Lateste, both driving 3.3-litre 930 turbos. Raymond Boutinard was the other Porsche entry, returning with his 4.7-litre Porsche 928 V8.

There were no American teams in the small, 3-car, GTO class. The Charles Ivey Engineering team had won class victories three years in a row latterly, in Group 5 and Group B, and this year was the favourite moving across to GTO, with their 930 turbo. The French Alméras brothers had a similar car, while Raymond Touroul was the underdog in his non-turbo 3-litre 911 SC.

The 1983 race had been the first post-war Le Mans without a Ferrari presence. This year, though, the Italian Scuderia Bellancauto did return to the race. The team had originally planned to convert their Ferrari 512BBB to Group C specification. However, the abrupt change in regulations to include IMSA classes changed their plan to instead convert it to be GTX-compatible. Fitted with a narrower chassis designed by Armando Palanca, it could reach 330 km/h (205 mph). They were the only GTX-entry, as the similar Ferrari cars of the North American Racing Team were withdrawn.

== Practice and Qualifying ==
Wanting to make a definite statement of intent, Lancia were out early in qualifying and soon put in very fast times with their wound-up qualifying-engines. Lancia were able to lock out the front row of the grid in qualifying. Bob Wollek easily took pole with a 3:17.1, more than three seconds over his team-mate. However, he never got a clear lap to challenge Jacky Ickx's time from the previous year, much to Wollek's disappointment (although he did win his body-weight in champagne). The biggest issue for Lancia was a major accident for Martini in the third car. Walter Brun had spun off in the Porsche Curves, and as he rejoined the track under the waved yellows, Martini came flying round the blind corner on a hot lap, hitting Brun's car square in the mid-rift. Neither driver was hurt but both cars were badly damaged, necessitating a lot of work for the mechanics overnight to repair them.

Well behind them was the pack of 956s, led by the two yellow New Man Joest cars. The best time they could put up was a distant 3:26.1 for Johansson (over 2 seconds slower than their times the year before). Next were the lead cars of the RLR-Canon (Palmer), JFR Skoal Bandit (Hobbs) and Kremer (Schuppan) teams. Eighth was the WM (3:30.0 – six seconds and ten places better than they did the previous year), with the other Kremer Porsche 9th and the Nimrod in 10th. A number of the Porsche teams were finding their new high-downforce nose-cones that set up disturbing fishtailing along the long straits. For those who still had them, some teams reverted to the original low-grip noses. This wasn't an option, however for the new 962s which left their drivers very concerned. A further concerning problem struck the Ivey Porsche, when the suspension failed and it lost its front wheel during practice. De Cadenet would lose another wheel in the Porsche Curves on Saturday evening. The best of the GTPs was Tullius' Jaguar in 14th (3:35.3) with the March down in 35th (3:50.5). The new 962s were disappointing and off-the-pace with the aerodynamic issues, only qualifying 16th (JFR) and 26th (Henn). The Courage was the fastest of the Cosworth-powered cars in 20th. Top in C2, once again, was the nimble Alba in 22nd (3:41.48) out-qualifying a third of the C1 and GTP cars. Their nearest opposition was the Rondeau in 30th (3:47.5). Among the GTs, it was the GTO-entered Alméras Porsche that was quickest by a sizeable margin, with a 4:02.8 (45th) ahead of the Winther BMW of Group B (46th with a 4:09.9). The GTX Ferrari was just ahead of them in 43rd.

== Race ==
=== Start ===
This year the race start-time was moved to 3pm, and the event was run in good weather throughout. As the pace-car pulled off, several cars were already in the pitlane with engine issues - the ADA, Ecosse and Gall's BMW. Wollek duly took the lead into the Dunlop curve from the start, but was surprised when the little yellow bullet that was Dorchy's WM blasted past them all down Hunaudières straight, from eighth on the grid on a light fuel-load, to outbrake him at the Mulsanne corner. WM now led Le Mans for the first time in the team's history. Wollek took back the lead on the second lap, only for Dorchy to snatch it back again on lap 3. This time, however, when he braked for Mulsanne the car snapped left and clattered the guardrail leading to a slow trip back to the pits. But this did not give Wollek a clear path, and for the next half-hour he was hounded by the Porsches of Johansson, Palmer and Schuppan with the lead often chopping and changing. This thrilled the crowd with the unexpected sprint-race tactics.

Several early pit-callers in the first laps were Lloyd in his RLR-Canon Porsche (brakes) and Pescarolo in the Joest Porsche (fuel pressure). After 40 minutes, by the time of the first fuel stops (around lap 11–13) it was Schuppan with a narrow lead. With their larger tanks in GTP, the Jaguars could run up to a quarter-hour longer. So it gave them a brief moment of glory with Tullius leading the race for Jaguar upon their return. Yet, this was only a brief respite as the close racing continued on as the teams' second drivers picked up the pace. After the first hour, there were only four cars left on the lead-lap. After their early problems, Ludwig and Pescarolo were down in 30th. Then Palmer felt a wobble at Tertre Rouge, and got back to the pits to find the car had a broken rear wishbone. The repairs took a quarter-hour and dropped them to the bottom of the field. They were making progress back up the field when the same thing happened on the other rear wishbone. The Team Australia Porsche had been running as high as eighth until a wheel came off at the Porsche Curves. The leading group were often running barely fifteen seconds apart. After four hours the two Lancias were still battling with the Joest, Kremer and JFR Porsches, all five still on the lead lap. There had been fifteen lead changes in the first 50 laps. Behind them were the JFR 962, Rondeau in the Henn Porsche that split the two Jaguars, with Ray Mallock's Nimrod in tenth, themselves all in close-running tussles. However, soon after, Keegan went straight ahead at the Indianapolis corner when his steering jammed. The car got back to the pits but the suspension was wrecked and the JFR 962 had to be retired. Johansson's Joest Porsche then had a big spin on dropped oil at Indianapolis. The damage was not severe but took over an hour to remedy, including borrowing parts from the JFR team. They returned to the race now down in 37th place. It was then the turn of the Kremer Porsche to be delayed. At 8.30pm, having held the lead for a majority of the past few hours, Schuppan came round a corner to find Dorchy spinning right in front of him. He tried to dodge the errant WM, but it rebounded off the barrier into his path. Winging the car, Schuppan lost 8 minutes getting a wheel-rim and front nose repaired. Without a spare, the team were forced to fit a short-nose to the car until the original got repaired and re-fitted later on. All these issues with the Porsches left the Wollek/Nannini Lancia with a lap's lead. In C2, the class-lead was a contest between the Facetti/Finotto/Vanoli Alba and the Graff Racing Rondeau, with the Lola-Mazdas tracking them, not far behind. Then, either side of 7pm, the Alba lost time replacing the fuel pump and fuel injector.

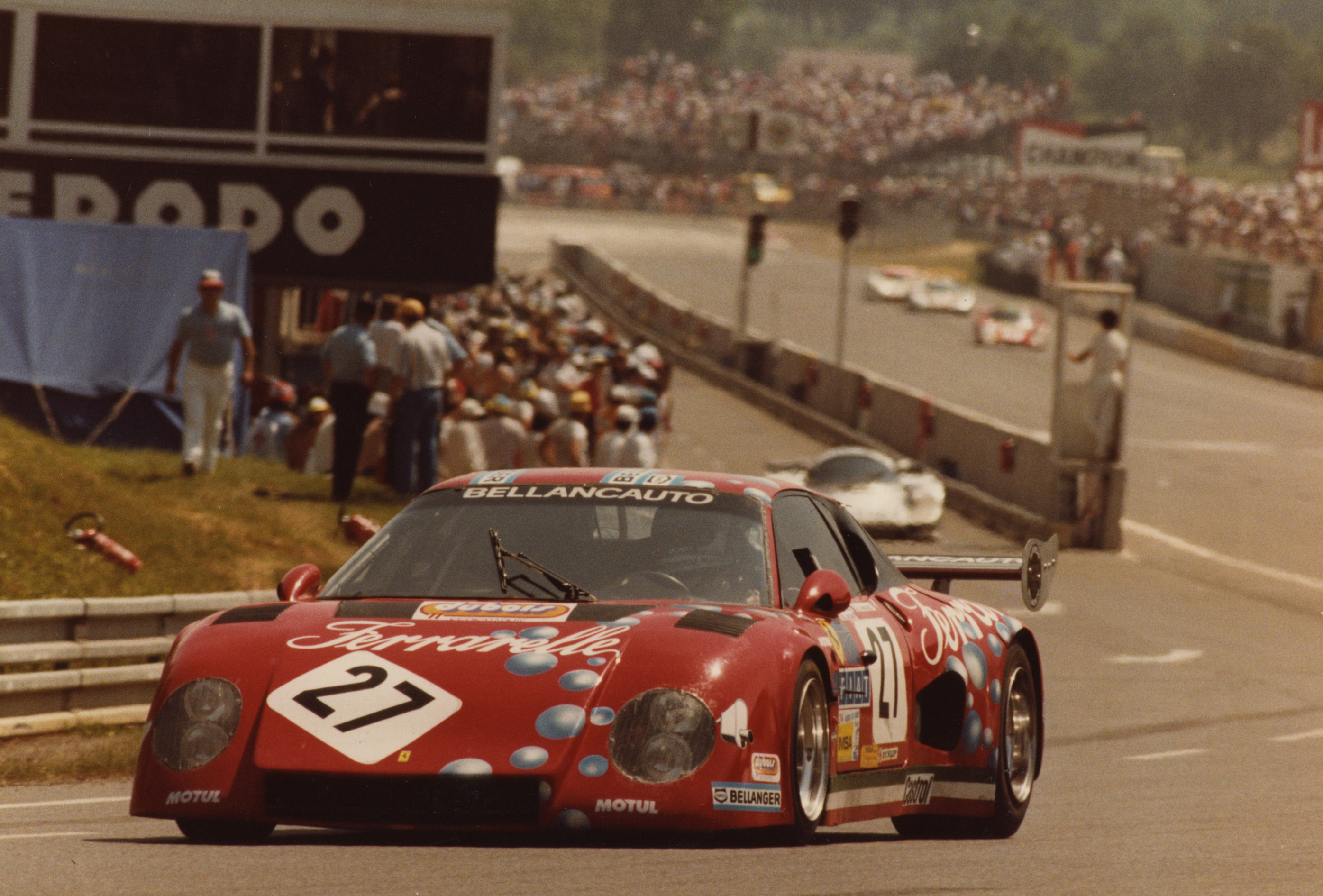
Scuderia Bellancauto Ferrari at the Dunlop Curve

Then in the twilight, at 9.20pm there was a major accident on the Hunaudières straight. The two Nimrod-Aston Martins were travelling in close proximity, as Sheldon had just lapped his teammate Olsen, with Palmer in turn overtaking him. Sheldon was storming down the straight at full speed, when a puncture made the car suddenly jerk left at the kink approaching the Mulsanne hairpin. The car violently ricocheted across the circuit. Palmer saw the dust and immediately braked as the stricken Nimrod thumped the barrier on the right and exploded in a fireball. Olsen was right behind Palmer, and unsighted, re-passed the slowing Palmer just as a big piece of debris from the crash flew across the track into the path of the other Nimrod. In avoiding it, he himself went into the barrier. The fire was so fierce it set some of the trees alight. John Sheldon was airlifted to hospital with serious burns, but Olsen was unhurt. Sadly, flag marshal Jacky Loiseau was hit by flying debris and killed in the accident, and another badly injured. The field was collected up behind four pace-cars for an hour as the damage cleared away and repairs were made.

=== Night ===
Night had fallen by the time the race went green again. Soon the second Lancia of Baldi/Heyer/Barilla, that had been lying third, passed the Hobbs JFR Porsche moved up the field. Going into the night, the Lancias were running 1-2 and showing good reliability. After a routine, careful race, by midnight the Rondeau/Paul Porsche was now in fourth, with the Kremer Porsche (delayed when van der Merwe ran over debris), the two Jaguars and the Schornstein Porsche not far behind, all covered by only three laps. At 2am Palmer had just got the RLR Porsche back into the top-10 when he pitted expressing concern about the gearbox. Unfortunately, the pit crew did not secure the engine cover properly and when Lammers took the car out, it blew off two laps later going into the Dunlop Curve. That cost the team 40 minutes and six places. Just before half-time, Heyer pitted his Lancia, running second, having stripped its top gear. Repairs took 62 minutes and they emerged in 14th, just ahead of the recovering RLR Porsche. The Skoal Bandit car moved back into second, back on the same lap as the leader. After an early delay with variable fuel pressure, the Joest Porsche of Ludwig/Pescarolo had charged back through the field and was now sitting third. In further close racing in the top-10, the Jaguars were swapping positions with the Porsches of Rondeau, Schornstein and now both Kremer cars, according to the pitting cycles.

The Racing 44 team were banking on their reliability to give a good result, but their luck ran out in the 14th hour. At 4am Claude Ballot-Léna stopped at Arnage with a broken throttle cable. By the time he jury-rigged a repair and got back to the pits to have it replaced, it had lost them 8 laps. The litany of incidents affecting the customer Porsches continued throughout the night. The Team Australia car was out when Perkins crashed at Tertre Rouge. The Johansson/Schlesser/de Narvaez Joest car also retired. Having been an early leader, Schlesser had gone off-road and getting repairs also found terminal engine issues. The Obermeier Porsche was put out, yet another victim of a wheel going adrift. Tiff Needell had a scary moment in his Kremer Porsche, when a bolt sheared in the gearbox plate leaving his rear suspension unsecured. He was coming through the Porsche Curves at speed when the car suddenly slewed left into the barriers. Crawling back to the pits, repairing the steering rack took two hours.

As dawn approached, Wollek made a stop to fix a broken suspension link, but was soon able to take back the lead when the JFR car had a scheduled brake change. Both Jaguars had been running well, staying in the top-10. However, as dawn was breaking Adamowicz crashed at Tertre Rouge when he suffered a puncture while running in 8th. Back at the pits, it was found the damage had broken the oil tank.

=== Morning ===
The reliability of the Lancia finally failed at 7am. As the crowd were rousing themselves for breakfast, the race took on a new complexion. Wollek came in without his fifth gear, but then one of the turbos also needed replacing. This took an hour and he returned to the race in fifth. Less than an hour later, the recovering sister-car lost a half-hour repairing a broken gear-linkage. The Skoal Bandit JFR car only had the lead for a lap before Streiff also pitted, with the engine sounding rough. Plugs were changed but van der Merwe had to go back out just running on five cylinders. To round off the mechanical issues, the remaining Jaguar had lost its third gear. Redman came back out after 45 minutes in tenth place. The Lammers/Palmer RLR car threw its alternator belt ruining the engine and forcing their retirement.

All this action put the Pescarolo/Ludwig Joest Porsche into the lead, having run very reliably after their delay very early in the race. With six hours to go, they had a lap over the American Porsche of Henn/Rondeau/Paul running like clockwork in the top-5 all through the night. A degree of consistency came over the field, with the Schuppan Kremer car in third, climbing back up the field, and the JFR Bandit car in 4th. Wollek was going very quickly in the Lancia in 5th, setting the fastest lap of the race at this time. The Brun Porsche had quietly come up the field to be 6th, with the Rondeau and Bundy's Jaguar behind. The top-10 was rounded out with the Joest-supported Schornstein car and the other Brun Porsche.

In the GT classes, the cars had been duelling back and forth, and there were three cars left in both classes. In Group B, Claude Haldi had led going into the night, but during the darkness the lead had been swapping back and forth with the Helmut Gall BMW. By mid-morning, the latter finally managed to establish a gap over the Porsche. The favoured Danish BMW had retired before half-time after ongoing issues with its exhaust and wheel bearings kept it from being competitive. Raymond Touroul's non-turbo Porsche had led the GTO class since the first hour, after early issues stymied his rivals and they never caught up.

From all the issues to the Porsche teams through the night, the mechanical problems in the latter part of the race mainly affected the other manufacturers. Dorchy's WM was finally retired after a series of troubles, including over three hours lost repairing damage from a trio of separate excursions by Dorchy. The pit-crew did a full gearbox rebuild at dawn only for it to fail again at 7.30am. The run of the remaining Jaguar ended around 11.30am when its gearbox seized solid. At the same time, the Rondeau had been having a good run, moving up to 7th through the morning. They became another victim of a burnt-out cylinder, spending 90 minutes in the pits. Alain Ferté drove a cautious shift until parking with 40 minutes to go to eventually finish 13th. The second Lancia finally expired with a broken camshaft, and then soon after 1pm the Wollek/Nannini car came in with its fifth gear broken again. With not enough time to do the major repairs, the car was parked up until the final minutes to at least get to the finish.

=== Finish and post-race ===
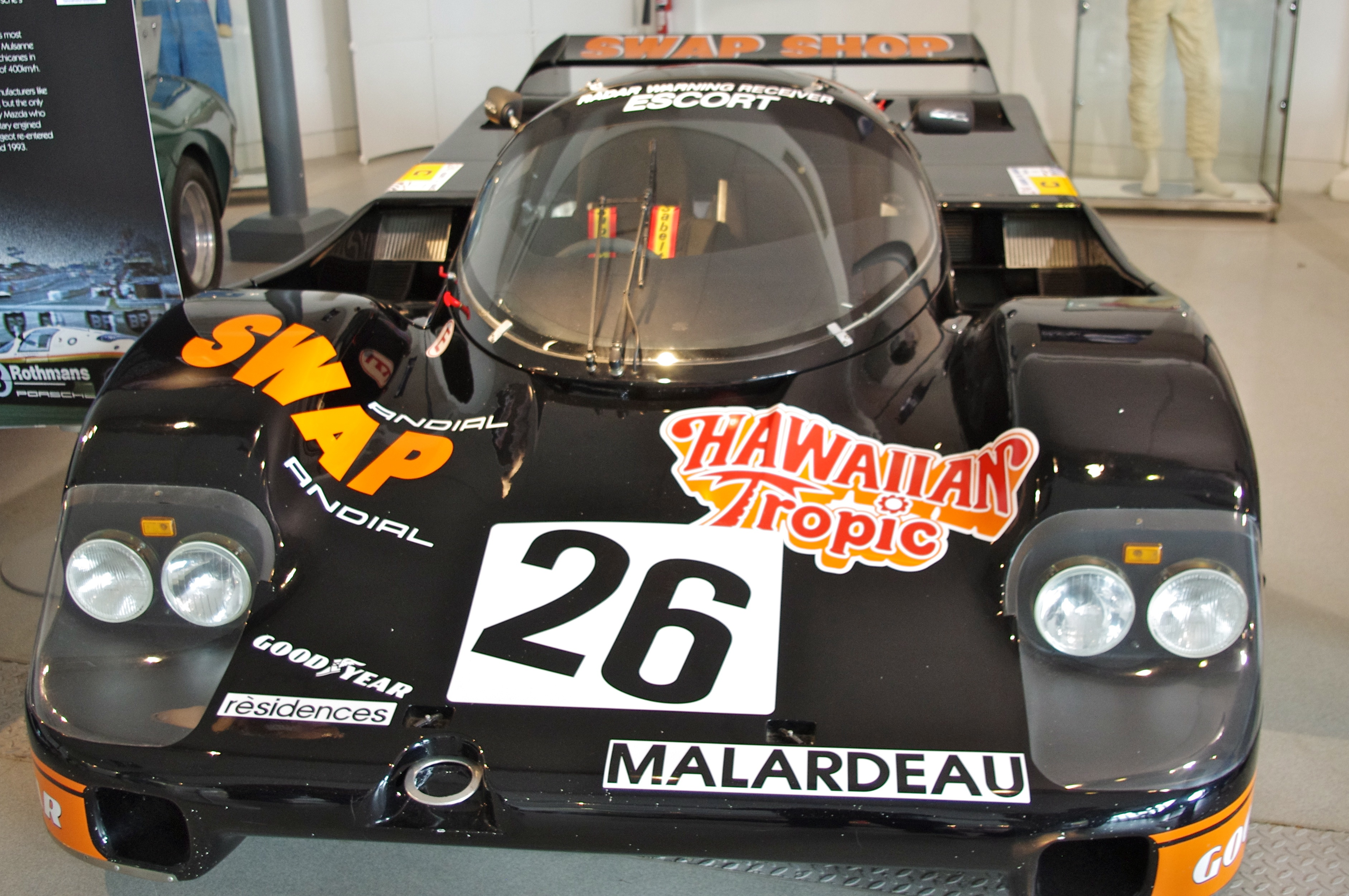
The Rondeau/Paul Porsche 956 which placed second

This left the top-10 full of Porsches suggesting a dominance that had been anything but Vern Schuppan had just jumped into the Kremer car for his final stint and passed Henn into go up to second, when the engine dropped onto five cylinders. They likewise parked up and eventually came out at the end, to finish sixth. Many cars were now easing back to save their cars, but it was not an option for the Brun and Schornstein cars on the same lap fighting for fourth place. In a strange scene, a number of cars crawled to a halt at the end of the Porsche Curves on the last lap awaiting the leader to come by, so they did not have to do an extra lap. In the end, Ludwig brought the Joest Porsche to the chequered flag two laps ahead of the American Porsche of Preston Henn. Wollek came out at the end and shadowed the winning car on the last laps to finish eighth a full 34 laps down. The John Fitzpatrick Bandit Porsche of Hobbs/Streiff/van der Merwe was third, nine laps behind while the Brun Motorsport Porsche just held on by half a lap for fourth over the Schornstein car.

Tenth overall, and first in the C Junior class, was the Lola-Mazda of the BF Goodrich team. Drivers Katayama, Morton and O'Steen had a very reliable run; the only delay being a quarter-hour lost with the starter motor at 7.40am. The sister car had several interruptions during the night when it hit debris and late Sunday morning losing an hour fixing the gearbox. However, they also got to the finish, third in class. Second was the Rondeau M379 of Graff Racing, having a strong Le Mans debut and a solid run. By contrast, the Mazdaspeed works team had a difficult race. Kennedy had just taken the class lead at dawn when the suspension forced a long pit-stop. The other car had a number of issues but still managed to stay in contact with the class leaders. However, its gearbox broke at 11.15am. Once repaired, the crew rammed it into third gear and Terada moved out with Kennedy in formation to take the flag. In Class B, after an inauspicious start almost losing their bonnet on the very first lap, the Gall BMW had got to the lead by mid-morning and held on for the class victory, finishing 14th overall. They were 7 laps ahead of Claude Haldi's Porsche after they spent almost an hour fixing their brakes. In the GTO Class, Raymond Touroul's Porsche had never been headed during the race. They took an easy class victory, covering 18 laps further than they did the previous year when they ran a Class B 930.

Pescarolo became only the third driver to win the race four times, and it had been ten years since his previous victory, with Matra. For Ludwig, this was his second victory after joining with the Whittington brothers in the 1979 Kremer-Porsche. This was the first Le Mans victory for Joest Racing, following their aforementioned German rivals. Never before in the race's history had a winning car been so lowly-placed after the first hour and come back to take the victory. For Porsche, it was their ninth victory, equalling the tally of Ferrari. The four new 956B cars all finished, taking four of the top six places.

In July FISA confirmed their decision to reduce the fuel allocation down to 530 litre from the current 600. It further stated that a new method for moderating the power outputs would be devised for 1986. The Bellancauto Ferrari had retired early in the race, and that would be the last Ferrari racing at Le Mans for ten years. It was also the last time that the Mooncraft division prepared the Mazda sports cars, as they turned to focus on their own single-seater project. Development was picked up directly by the Mazdaspeed team. That such an exciting race had occurred, despite being without the works Porsches, spoke volumes for the racing regulations and their competitiveness. It boded well for the next year.

== Official results ==
=== Finishers ===
Results taken from Quentin Spurring's book, officially licensed by the ACO
Class Winners are in Bold text.

Pos	Class	No.	Team	Drivers	Chassis	Engine	Tyre	Laps
1	**Gr.C1**	**7**	**(West Germany) NewMan Joest Racing**	**(France) Henri Pescarolo** **(West Germany) Klaus Ludwig**	Porsche 956B	Porsche 935/79 2.6L F6 twin turbo	D	360
2	Gr.C1	26	(United States) Henn's T-Bird Swap Shop	(France) Jean Rondeau (United States) John Paul Jr.	Porsche 956	Porsche 935/79 2.6L F6 twin turbo	G	358
3	Gr.C1	33	(United Kingdom) John Fitzpatrick Racing (United Kingdom) Skoal Bandit Porsche Team	(United Kingdom) David Hobbs (France) Philippe Streiff (South Africa) Sarel van der Merwe	Porsche 956B	Porsche 935/79 2.6L F6 twin turbo	Y	351
4	Gr.C1	9	(Switzerland) Brun Motorsport	(Switzerland) Walter Brun (West Germany) Prinz Leopold von Bayern (United States) Bob Akin	Porsche 956B	Porsche 935/79 2.6L F6 twin turbo	D	340
5	Gr.C1	12	(West Germany) Schornstein Racing Team (West Germany) NewMan Joest Racing	(West Germany) Dieter Schornstein (West Germany) Volkert Merl (West Germany) "John Winter" (Louis Krages)	Porsche 956	Porsche 935/79 2.6L F6 twin turbo	D	340
6	Gr.C1	11	(West Germany) Porsche Kremer Racing	(Australia) Vern Schuppan (Australia) Alan Jones (France) Jean-Pierre Jarier	Porsche 956B	Porsche 935/79 2.6L F6 twin turbo	D	337
7	Gr.C1	20	(Switzerland) Brun Motorsport Team Gaggia	(Argentina) Oscar Larrauri (Italy) Massimo Sigala (France) Joël Gouhier	Porsche 956	Porsche 935/79 2.6L F6 twin turbo	D	335
8	Gr.C1	4	(Italy) Martini Racing	(France) Bob Wollek (Italy) Alessandro Nannini	Lancia LC2	Ferrari 308C 3.0L V8 twin turbo	D	326
9	Gr.C1	17	(West Germany) Porsche Kremer Racing	(United Kingdom) Tiff Needell (United Kingdom) David Sutherland (Australia) Rusty French	Porsche 956	Porsche 935/79 2.6L F6 twin turbo	D	321
10	**Gr.C2**	**68**	**(United States) BF Goodrich**	**(United States) John Morton** **(Japan) Yoshimi Katayama** **(United States) John O'Steen**	Lola T616	Mazda 13B 1308cc twin-rotary	BF	320
11	Gr.C2	93	(France) Graff Racing (France) J.-P. Grand (private entrant)	(France) Jean-Philippe Grand (Belgium) Jean-Paul Libert (Belgium) Pascal Witmeur	Rondeau M379C	Cosworth DFV 3.0 L V8	A	310
12	Gr.C2	67	(United States) BF Goodrich	(United States) Jim Busby (Netherlands) Boy Hayje (United States) Rick Knoop	Lola T616	Mazda 13B 1308cc twin-rotary	BF	295
13	Gr.C1	72	(France) Automobiles Jean Rondeau (United States) McCormack and Dodge	(France) Alain Ferté (United States) Jim Mullen (United States) Walt Bohren	Rondeau M482	Cosworth DFL 3.3L V8	G	293
14	**Gr.B**	**93**	**(West Germany) H. Gall** (private entrant)	**(France) Jean-François Yvon** **(France) Pierre de Thoisy** **(France) Philippe Dagoreau**	BMW M1	BMW M88 3.5L S6	D	292
15	Gr.C2	87	(Japan) Mazdaspeed	(Republic of Ireland) David Kennedy (Belgium) Jean-Michel Martin (Belgium) Philippe Martin	Mazda 727C	Mazda 13B 1308cc twin-rotary	D	286
16	Gr.B	106	(Switzerland) C. Haldi (private entrant)	(Switzerland) Claude Haldi (West Germany) Altfrid Heger (Switzerland) Jean Krucker	Porsche 911 Turbo (930) 930	Porsche 930/60 3.3L F6 turbo	M	285
17	**IMSA**; **GTO**	**122**	**(France) R. Touroul** (private entrant)	**(France) Raymond Touroul** **(France) Valentin Bertapelle** **(France) Thierry Perrier**	Porsche 911 SC	Porsche 3.0L F6	M	283
18	IMSA; GTO	123	(France) Equipe Alméras Frères (private entrant)	(France) Jacques Alméras (France) Jean-Marie Alméras (United States) Tom Winters	Porsche 911 Turbo (930)	Porsche 930/60 3.3L F6 turbo	M	269
19	Gr.C2	81	(Italy) Scuderia Jolly Club	(Italy) Almo Coppelli (Italy) Davide Pavia (Italy) Guido Daccò	Alba AR2	Giannini Carma FF; 1980cc S4 turbo	D	262
20	Gr.C2	86	(Japan) Mazdaspeed	(Japan) Yojiro Terada (Belgium) Pierre Dieudonné (Japan) Takashi Yorino	Mazda 727C	Mazda 13B 1308cc twin-rotary	D	262
21	Gr.C2	80	(Italy) Scuderia Jolly Club	(Italy) Carlo Facetti (Italy) Martino Finotto (Switzerland) Marco Vanoli	Alba AR2	Giannini Carma FF; 1980cc S4 turbo	D	258
22	Gr.B	107	(France) R. Boutinaud (private entrant)	(France) Raymond Boutinaud (France) Philippe Renault (France) Giles Guinand	Porsche 928S	Porsche 4.7L V8	M	256

=== Did Not Finish ===
Pos	Class	No	Team	Drivers	Chassis	Engine	Tyre	Laps	Reason
DNF	IMSA; GTP	44	(United States) Group 44 Racing	(United States) Bob Tullius (United Kingdom) Brian Redman (United States) Doc Bundy	Jaguar XJR-5	Jaguar 6.0L V12	G	291	Gearbox (21hr)
DNF	Gr.C1	5	(Italy) Martini Racing	(Italy) Mauro Baldi (West Germany) Hans Heyer (Italy) Paolo Barilla	Lancia LC2	Ferrari 308C 3.0L V8 twin turbo	D	275	Engine (20hr)
DNF	Gr.C1	21	(United Kingdom) Charles Ivey Racing	(United Kingdom) Chris Craft (United Kingdom) Alain de Cadenet (Australia) Allan Grice	Porsche 956	Porsche 935/79 2.6L F6 twin turbo	D	274	Engine (22hr)
DNF	IMSA; GTP	61	(United States) Henn's T-Bird Swap Shop	(United States) Preston Henn (France) Michel Ferté (West Germany) Edgar Dören	Porsche 962	Porsche 962/70 2.9L F6 turbo	G	247	Electrics (20hr)
DNF	Gr.C1	14	(United Kingdom) Canon Racing (United Kingdom) Richard Lloyd Racing (United Kingdom) GTi Engineering	(United Kingdom) Jonathan Palmer (Netherlands) Jan Lammers	Porsche 956	Porsche 935/79 2.6L F6 twin turbo	D	239	Engine (18hr)
DNF	IMSA; GTP	40	(United States) Group 44 Racing	(United States) Tony Adamowicz (United Kingdom) John Watson (France) Claude Ballot-Léna	Jaguar XJR-5	Jaguar 6.0L V12	G	212	Accident (16hr)
DNF	Gr.C1	8	(West Germany) NewMan Joest Racing	(Sweden) Stefan Johansson (France) Jean-Louis Schlesser (Colombia) Mauricio de Narváez	Porsche 956	Porsche 935/79 2.6L F6 twin turbo	D	170	Engine (14hr)
DNF	Gr.C1	38	(United Kingdom) Dorset Racing Associates	(United Kingdom) Nick Faure (United Kingdom) Mark Galvin (United Kingdom) Richard Jones	Dome RC82i	Cosworth DFL 3.3L V8	M	156	Engine (13hr)
DNF	Gr.C1	50	(France) Compagnie Primagaz (France) P. Yver (private entrant)	(France) Pierre Yver (Belgium) Bernard de Dryver; Pierre-François Rousselot	Rondeau M382	Cosworth DFV 3.0L V8	D	155	Electrics (14hr)
DNF	Gr.C1	13	(France) Courage Compétition (France) Compagnie Primagaz	(France) Yves Courage (France) Michel Dubois (United States) John Jellinek	Cougar C02	Cosworth DFL 3.3L V8	M	153	Oil Pump (13hr)
DNF	Gr.C1	47	(West Germany) Obermaier Racing	(West Germany) Jürgen Lässig (South Africa) George Fouché (Canada) John Graham	Porsche 956	Porsche 935/79 2.6L F6 twin turbo	D	147	Accident (13hr)
DNF	IMSA; GTO	121	(United Kingdom) Charles Ivey Racing	(United Kingdom) David Ovey (United Kingdom) Paul Smith (United States) Margie Smith-Haas	Porsche 911 Turbo (930)	Porsche 930/60 3.3L F6 turbo	A	146	Oil leak (17hr)
DNF	Gr.C1	34	Team Australia (United Kingdom) John Fitzpatrick Racing	(Australia) Peter Brock (Australia) Larry Perkins	Porsche 956	Porsche 935/79 2.6L F6 twin turbo	D	145	Accident (11hr)
DSQ	Gr.C1	16	(United Kingdom) Richard Lloyd Racing (United Kingdom) GTi Engineering	(United Kingdom) Richard Lloyd (United Kingdom) Nick Mason (France) René Metge	Porsche 956	Porsche 935/79 2.6L F6 twin turbo	D	139	Outside assistance (12hr)
DNF	Gr.C1	23	(France) WM Secateva	(France) Roger Dorchy (France) Alain Courdec (France) Gérard Patté	WM P83B	Peugeot PRV ZNS4 2.8L; V6 twin-turbo	M	122	Gearbox (18hr)
DNF	Gr.C1	6	(Italy) Martini Racing	(Italy) Beppe Gabbiani (France) Xavier Lapeyre (Italy) Pierluigi Martini	Lancia LC2	Ferrari 308C 3.0L V8 twin turbo	D	117	Engine (11hr)
DNF	Gr.B	101	(Denmark) Jens Winther Team Castrol	(Denmark) Jens Winther (United Kingdom) David Mercer (Denmark) Lars-Viggo Jensen	BMW M1	BMW M88 3.5L S6	A	96	Suspension (10hr)
DNF	IMSA; GTP	62	(United States) Pegasus Racing (private entrant)	(United States) Ken Madren Jr (United States) Marion Speer (United States) Wayne Pickering	March 84G	Buick 3.3L V6 turbo	G	95	Engine (9hr)
DNF	Gr.C1	31	(United Kingdom) Viscount Downe Racing (private entrant) (United Kingdom) Aston Martin Lagonda	(United Kingdom) Ray Mallock (United States) Drake Olson	Nimrod NRA/C2B	Aston Martin DP1229 5.3L V8	A	94	Accident (7hr)
DNF	Gr.C1	32	(United Kingdom) Viscount Downe Racing (private entrant) (United Kingdom) Aston Martin Lagonda	(United Kingdom) John Sheldon (United Kingdom) Mike Salmon (United Kingdom) Richard Attwood	Nimrod NRA/C2B	Aston Martin DP1229 5.3L V8	A	92	Accident (7hr)
DNF	Gr.C1	24	(France) WM Secateva	(France) Jean-Daniel Raulet (France) Michel Pignard (France) Pascal Pessiot	WM P83B	Peugeot PRV ZNS4 3.1L; V6 twin-turbo	M	74	Engine (9hr)
DNF	Gr.C1	55	(United Kingdom) John Fitzpatrick Racing (United Kingdom) Skoal Bandit Porsche Team	(Brazil) Roberto Moreno (United Kingdom) Guy Edwards (United Kingdom) Rupert Keegan	Porsche 962	Porsche 935/76 2.6L F6 twin turbo	Y	72	Accident (6hr)
DNF	Gr.B	114	(France) M. Lateste (private entrant)	(France) Michel Lateste (France) Michel Bienvault (France) Ségolen" (André Gahinet)	Porsche 911 Turbo (930)	Porsche 930/60 3.3L F6 turbo	M	70	Engine (7hr)
DNF	Gr.C2	70	(United Kingdom) Spice-Tiga Racing	(United Kingdom) Gordon Spice (United Kingdom) Ray Bellm (Australia) Neil Crang	Tiga GC84	Cosworth DFL 3.0L V8	A	69	Engine (9hr)
DNF	IMSA; GTX	27	(Italy) Scuderia Supercar; Bellancauto	(Italy) Roberto Marazzi (Italy) Maurizio Micangeli (France) Dominique Lacaud	Ferrari 512 BB/LM	Ferrari 4.9L F12	M	65	Gearbox (6hr)
DNF	Gr.C2	48 reserve	(United Kingdom) John Bartlett Racing (private entrant)	(France) François Migault (France) François Sérvanin (United Kingdom) Steve Kempton	Lola T610	Cosworth DFL 3.3 L V8	D	52	Accident (7hr)
DNF	Gr.C1	45	(France) C. Bussi (private entrant)	(France) Christian Bussi (United States) Jack Griffin (France) Bruno Ilien	Rondeau M382	Cosworth DFL 3.3 L V8	D	49	Throttle (8hr)
DNF	Gr.C2	79	(United Kingdom) ADA Engineering	(United Kingdom) Ian Harrower (United States) Bill Wolff (United States) Glen Smith	ADA 01	Cosworth DFL 3.3 L V8	M	42	Chassis (7hr)
DNF	Gr.C2	85	(France) H. Striebig (private entrant)	(France) Hubert Striebig (France) Noël del Bello (France) Jacques Heuclin	Sthemo SM02	BMW M88 3.5L S6	D	41	Gearbox (8hr)
DNF	Gr.C2	77	(United Kingdom) Ecurie Ecosse	(United Kingdom) Mike Wilds (United Kingdom) David Leslie (United Kingdom) David Duffield	Ecosse C284	Cosworth DFV 3.0L V8	A	36	Fuel pump (3hr)
DNF	Gr.C1	25	(United States) C.A.M. (United Kingdom) Charles Ivey Racing	(United Kingdom) Dudley Wood (United Kingdom) John Cooper (United Kingdom) Barry Robinson	Grid S2	Porsche 930/72 2.9L F6 twin turbo	A	10	Run out of fuel (1hr)

=== Did Not Start ===
Pos	Class	No	Team	Drivers	Chassis	Engine	Tyre	Reason
DNS	Gr.C1	39	(Japan) Uchida Dome Racing	(Sweden) Eje Elgh (Sweden) Stanley Dickens	Dome RC83	Cosworth DFL 4.0L V8	D	Practice Accident
DNQ	Gr.C2	99	(United Kingdom) JQF Engineering (private entrant)	(United Kingdom) Roy Baker (United Kingdom) Jeremy Rossiter (France) François Duret	Tiga GC284	Cosworth BDT 1778cc S4 turbo	A	Did not qualify
DNA	Gr.C1	1	(West Germany) Rothmans Porsche	(Belgium) Jacky Ickx (West Germany) Jochen Mass	Porsche 956B	Porsche 935/79 2.6L F6 twin turbo	D	Withdrawn
DNA	Gr.C1	2	(West Germany) Rothmans Porsche	(United Kingdom) Derek Bell (West Germany) Stefan Bellof	Porsche 956B	Porsche 935/79 2.6L F6 twin turbo	D	Withdrawn
DNA	Gr.C1	3	(West Germany) Rothmans Porsche		Porsche 956B	Porsche 935/79 2.6L F6 twin turbo	D	Withdrawn
DNA	Gr.C1	29	Sauber Team Switzerland		Sauber C7	BMW M88 3.5L S6		Did not arrive
DNA	Gr.C1	36	(United Kingdom) Richard Cleare Racing (private entrant)	(United Kingdom) Richard Cleare	Porsche C-K5	Porsche 935 2.9 L F6 turbo		Did not arrive
DNA	Gr.C1	42	(Switzerland) Cheetah Automobiles; Gatoil Suisse	(Switzerland) Loris Kessel (France) Jean-Pierre Jaussaud (France) Laurent Ferrier	Cheetah G604	Aston Martin DP1229 5.3L V8		Did not arrive
DNA	IMSA; GTX	63	(United States) North American Racing Team	(France) Alain Cudini (France) Dany Snobeck	Ferrari 512 BB/LM	Ferrari 4.9L F12		Did not arrive
DNA	IMSA; GTX	64	(United States) North American Racing Team		Ferrari 512 BB/LM	Ferrari 4.9L F12		Did not arrive
DNA	Gr.C2	74	(United Kingdom) Scorpion Racing Services (private entrant)	(United Kingdom) "Eddie Arundel" (Edward Fitzalan-Howard, Earl of Arundel) (United Kingdom) John Weaver (United States) John Jellinek	Arundel C200	Cosworth DFV 3.0L V8		Did not arrive
DNA	Gr.C2	90	(United Kingdom) Spice-Tiga Racing	(United Kingdom) Ray Bellm	Tiga GC84	Cosworth DFV 3.0L V8	A	Did not arrive
DNA	Gr.C2	92	(France) Automobiles; Louis Descartes	(France) Louis Descartes (France) Jean-Marie Lemerle (France) Daniël Hubert	ALD 01	BMW M88 3.5L S6		Did not arrive
DNA	Gr.B	102	(West Germany) E. Dören (private entrant)	(West Germany) Edgar Dören (West Germany) Hans-Christian Jürgensen (West Germany) Walter Mertes (West Germany) Ulli Richter	BMW M1	BMW M88 3.5L S6		Did not arrive
DNA	Gr.B	108	(Switzerland) A. Pallavicini (private entrant)	(Switzerland) Angelo Pallavicini	Porsche 911 Turbo (930)	Porsche 930/60 3.3L F6 turbo		Did not arrive
DNA	Gr.B	116	(West Germany) G. Memminger (private entrant)	(West Germany) Georg Memminger (West Germany) Heinz Kuhn-Wiess	Porsche 911 Turbo (930)	Porsche 930/60 3.3L F6 turbo	D	Did not arrive
DNA	IMSA; GTO	120	(United States) Stratagraph Inc.	(United States) Billy Hagan (United States) Gene Felton	Chevrolet Camaro	Chevrolet 5.7L V8		Did not arrive
DNA	IMSA; GTO	121	(United States) Stratagraph Inc.	(United States) Tommy Riggins (United States) Les Delano	Chevrolet Camaro	Chevrolet 5.7L V8		Did not arrive

=== Class Winners ===
Class	Winning car	Winning drivers
Group C1	#7 Porsche 956B	Pescarolo / Ludwig *
IMSA-GTP	no finishers	
Group C2	#68 Lola T616	Katayama / Morton / O'Steen *
Group B	#122 BMW M1	Yvon / Thoisy / Dagoreau
IMSA-GTX	no finishers	
IMSA-GTO	#122 Porsche 911 SC	Touroul / Perrier / Bertapelle

- Note: setting a new class distance record.

=== Index of Energy Efficiency ===
Pos	Class	No	Team	Drivers	Chassis	Score
1	Gr.C1	11	(West Germany) Porsche Kremer Racing	(Australia) Vern Schuppan (Australia) Alan Jones (France) Jean-Pierre Jarier	Porsche 956B	0.901
2	Gr.C1	7	(West Germany) NewMan Joest Racing	(France) Henri Pescarolo (West Germany) Klaus Ludwig	Porsche 956B	0.883
3	Gr.C1	26	(United States) Henn's T-Bird Swap Shop	(France) Jean Rondeau (United States) John Paul Jr.	Porsche 956	0.843
4	Gr.C1	33	(United Kingdom) John Fitzpatrick Racing (United Kingdom) Skoal Bandit Porsche Team	(United Kingdom) David Hobbs (France) Philippe Streiff (South Africa) Sarel van der Merwe	Porsche 956B	0.833
5	Gr.C2	86	(Japan) Mazdaspeed	(Japan) Yojiro Terada (Belgium) Pierre Dieudonné (Japan) Takashi Yorino	Mazda 727C	0.823
6	Gr.C2	68	(United States) BF Goodrich	(United States) John Morton (Japan) Yoshimi Katayama (United States) John O'Steen	Lola T616	0.821
7	Gr.C2	87	(Japan) Mazdaspeed	(Republic of Ireland) David Kennedy (Belgium) Jean-Michel Martin (Belgium) Philippe Martin	Mazda 727C	0.819
8	Gr.C2	81	(Italy) Scuderia Jolly Club	(Italy) Almo Coppelli (Italy) Davide Pavia (Italy) Guido Daccò	Alba AR2	0.816
9	Gr.C1	72	(France) Automobiles Jean Rondeau (United States) McCormack and Dodge	(France) Alain Ferté (United States) Jim Mullen (United States) Walt Bohren	Rondeau M482	0.815
10	Gr.C1	17	(West Germany) Porsche Kremer Racing	(United Kingdom) Tiff Needell (United Kingdom) David Sutherland (Australia) Rusty French	Porsche 956	0.808

- Note: Only the top ten positions are included in this set of standings.

=== Statistics ===
Taken from Quentin Spurring's book, officially licensed by the ACO

- Pole Position –B. Wollek, #4 Lancia LC2– 3:17.1secs; 248.9 km/h (154.7 mph)
- Fastest Lap – A. Nannini, #4 Lancia LC2– 3:28.9secs; 234.8 km/h (145.9 mph)
- Winning Distance – 4,900.28 km (3,044.89 mi)
- Winner's Average Speed – 204.18 km/h (126.87 mph)
- Attendance – ?

World Sportscar Championship
Previous race: 1984 1000 km of Silverstone	1984 season	Next race: 1984 1000 km of Nürburgring
