= 1985 12 Hours of Sebring =

Sports car endurance race

The Coca-Cola Classic 12 Hours of Sebring, was the third round of the 1985 IMSA GT Championship. The race was held at the Sebring International Raceway, on March 23, 1985. Victory overall went to the No. 8 Preston Henn Porsche 962 driven by A. J. Foyt, and Bob Wollek.

== Race results ==
Class winners in bold.

Pos	Class	No	Team	Drivers	Car	Laps
1	**GTP**	**8**	**(United States) Preston Henn**	**(United States) A. J. Foyt (France) Bob Wollek**	**Porsche 962**	**281**
2	GTP	14	(United States) Holbert Racing	(United States) Al Holbert (United Kingdom) Derek Bell (United States) Al Unser Jr.	Porsche 962	277
3	GTP	68	(United States) Busby Racing	(United States) Pete Halsmer (Austria) Dieter Quester (United States) Rick Knoop	Porsche 962	268
4	GTP	44	(United States) Group 44	(United States) Chip Robinson (United States) Bob Tullius	Jaguar XJR-5	259
5	**Lights**	**63**	**(United States) Jim Downing**	**(United States) Jim Downing (United States) John Maffucci**	**Argo JM16**	**253**
6	**GTO**	**65**	**(United States) Team Roush Protofab**	**(United States) Wally Dallenbach Jr. (Canada) John Jones**	**Ford Mustang**	**251**
7	GTP	2	(United States) Leon Bros. Racing	(United States) Al Leon (United States) Art Leon (United States) Skeeter McKitterick	March 85G	250
8	GTP	11	(United States) Kendall Racing	(United States) Chuck Kendall (United States) John Hotchkis (United States) Robert Kirby	Porsche 935 K3	240
9	GTO	90	(United States) Road Circuit Technology	(United States) Les Delano (United States) Andy Petery (United States) Patty Moise	Pontiac Firebird	239
10	GTO	09	(United States) 901 Shop	(United States) Peter Uria (United States) Mike Schaefer (United States) Larry Figaro (United States) Jack Refenning	Porsche 911 Carrera RSR	237
11	GTO	61	(United States) Team USA Racing	(United States) Don Courtney (United States) Brent O'Neill (United States) Mike Hackney	Chevrolet Monza	231
12	GTO	89	(El Salvador) Latino Racing	(El Salvador) "Jamsal" (Costa Rica) Kikos Fonseca (United States) Alfredo Mena	Porsche 934	219
13 DNF	GTO	53	(United States) Mandeville Auto Tech	(United States) Danny Smith (United States) Tom Waugh	Mazda RX-7	218
14	Lights	37	(United States) Burdsall - Welter Racing	(United States) Tom Burdsall (United States) Peter Welter (United States) Nick Nicholson	Tiga GT284	216
15	**GTU**	**56**	**(United States) SP Racing**	**(United States) Gary Auberlen (United States) Peter Jauker (United States) Adrian Gang (United States) Cary Eisenlohr**	**Porsche 911 Carrera**	**209**
16	Lights	93	(United States) Mid-O/Rusty Jones	(United States) Kelly Marsh (United States) Ron Pawley (United States) Don Marsh	Argo JM16	205
17	GTP	31	(United States) Goral Racing	(United States) Paul Goral (United States) Rick Wilson	Porsche 935	204
18 DNF	GTO	39	(Canada) R & H Racing	(Canada) Rainer Brezinka (Canada) John Centano (Canada) Fritz Hochreuter	Porsche 911 Carrera RSR	202
19	GTU	00	(United States) Tommy Kendall	(United States) Tommy Kendall (United States) Bart Kendall (United States) Max Jones	Mazda RX-7	202
20 DNF	GTO	58	(United States) Coin Operated Racing	(United States) Rick Borlase (United States) Michael Hammond (United States) Jim Torres	Porsche 934	198
21	Lights	34	(United States) O'Brien - van Steenburg Racing	(United States) Larry O'Brien (United States) Mike Van Steenburg	Mazda OVS-1	184
22	GTO	98	(United States) Bob's Speed Products	(United States) Bob Lee (United States) Bill Julian (United States) Jeff Hudlett	Buick Skyhawk	182
23	GTP	20	(United States) Spirit of Cleveland	(United States) Richard Silver (United States) Don Herman (United States) Freddy Baker	Porsche 935	182
24 DNF	GTO	38	(United States) Mandeville Auto Tech	(United States) Roger Mandeville (United States) Logan Blackburn	Mazda RX-7	180
25	GTU	35	(United States) Team Dallas	(United States) Jack Griffin (United States) Bobby Hefner (United States) Skip Winfree	Porsche 911 Carrera RSR	178
26 DNF	GTP	67	(United States) Busby Racing	(United States) Jim Busby (United States) John Morton (Germany) Jochen Mass	Porsche 962	175
27 DNF	GTP	15	(United States) John Kalagian Racing	(United States) John Kalagian (United States) John Lloyd (United States) Tom Grunnah	March 84G	170
28	GTU	36	(United States) Case Racing	(United States) Ron Case (United States) Dave Panaccione	Porsche 911	165
29	GTO	83	(United States) K & P Racing	(United States) Karl Keck (United States) William Wessel (United States) Mark Montgomery	Chevrolet Corvette	158
30 DNF	GTP	43	(Colombia) De Narvaez Enterprises	(Colombia) Mauricio de Narváez (United States) Dave Cowart (United States) Kenper Miller	Porsche 935	157
31	GTU	02	(United States) RNGC Racing	(United States) Roy Newsome (United States) Bill McVey (United States) Dale Kreider	Mazda RX-7	148
32 DNF	GTO	88	(United States) Schaferacing	(United States) Craig Shafer (United States) George Shafer (United States) Joe Maloy	Chevrolet Camaro	145
33 DNF	GTO	55	(United States) Dave Heinz Imports	(United States) Dave Heinz (United States) Jim Trueman (United States) Jerry Thompson	Chevrolet Corvette	134
34 DNF	GTO	78	(United States) Tokina Zoom Lenses	(United States) John Higgins (United States) Chip Mead (United States) James King	Porsche 911 Carrera RSR	128
35 DNF	GTP	7	(United States) Henn's Swap Shop Racing	(France) Bob Wollek (United States) Don Whittington (United States) Preston Henn	Porsche 935	121
36	GTO	85	(United States) Don Nooe	(United States) Don Nooe (United States) Jim Stricklin (United States) Tim Stringfellow	Chevrolet Corvette	118
37 DNF	GTU	42	(United States) Mike Meyer/Daffy	(United States) Paul Lewis (United States) Scott Pruett (United States) Joe Varde	Mazda RX-7	117
38 DNF	GTO	81	(United States) Ken Bupp	(United States) Ken Bupp (United States) Guy Church (United States) E. J. Generotti	Chevrolet Camaro	116
39 DNF	GTU	76	(United States) Malibu Grand Prix	(United States) Jack Baldwin (United States) Jeff Kline	Mazda RX-7	114
40 DNF	GTP	1	(United States) Blue Thunder Racing Team	(United States) Bill Whittington (United States) Randy Lanier	March 85G	114
41 DNF	GTO	45	(Puerto Rico) Pennzoil de P. R.	(Puerto Rico) Luis Gordillo (Puerto Rico) Rolando Falgueras (Puerto Rico) Manuel Villa	Porsche 911 Carrera RSR	111
42	GTU	54	(United States) Zwiren Racing	(United States) Steve Zwiren (United States) Mike Tearney (Canada) Robert Peters	Mazda RX-7	111
43	GTO	25	(United States) Steve Roberts	(United States) William Boyer (United States) Steve Roberts (United States) John Barben	Chevrolet Camaro	109
44 DNF	GTP	01	(United States) Charles Young	(United States) Don Bell (United States) Mike Brockman (United States) Tommy Riggins	Argo JM16	105
45 DNF	GTO	22	(United States) Walter Johnston	(United States) Del Russo Taylor (United Kingdom) John Hayes-Harlow (United States) Arvid Albanese	Pontiac Firebird	101
46 DNF	GTU	75	(United States) Pettit Wholesale	(United States) Cameron Worth (United States) Foko Gritzalis	Mazda RX-3	91
47 DNF	GTP	29	(United States) DeAtley Racing	(United States) Darin Brassfield (Netherlands) Arie Luyendyk (United States) Jerry Brassfield	March 85G	90
48 DNF	GTO	51	(United States) Mosler Racing	(United States) John McComb (United States) Rick Mancuso (United States) Fred Fiala	Ferrari 512 BB	88
49 DNF	GTP	05	(United States) Robert Whitaker	(United States) Robert Whitaker (United States) Ed Crosby (United States) Richard McDill	Chevrolet Camaro	76
50 DNF	GTP	16	(United States) Marty Hinze Racing	(United States) Marty Hinze (United States) Milt Minter (United States) Art Yarosh	Porsche 935 K3	70
51 DNF	GTP	26	(United States) Toyota Village	(United States) Werner Frank (United States) Dave White (United States) Jerry Kendall	Porsche 935	68
52 DNF	GTU	17	(United States) Al Bacon Racing	(United States) Al Bacon (United States) Charles Guest (United States) Bobby Akin	Mazda RX-7	67
53 DNF	GTP	5	(United States) Bob Akin Motor Racing	(Germany) Hans-Joachim Stuck (United States) Bob Akin (United States) Jim Mullen	Porsche 962	66
54 DNF	GTU	79	(United States) Whitehall Motorsports	(United States) Elliot Forbes-Robinson (United States) Tom Winters (United States) Bob Bergstrom	Porsche 924 Carrera GTR	65
55 DNF	GTU	49	(United States) Conrad Racing	(United States) Carlos Munoz (United States) Louis Lopez (United States) Herman Galeano	Porsche 911	65
56 DNF	GTO	47	(United States) Dingman Brothers Racing	(United States) Walt Bohren (New Zealand) Steve Millen (United States) Billy Dingman	Pontiac Firebird	63
57 DNF	GTU	74	(United States) Whitehall Promotion	(United States) Austin Godsey (United States) Paul Gentilozzi (United States) Kent Hill	Porsche 924 Carrera GTR	59
58 DNF	GTO	21	(United States) Gopher Motion	(United States) William Gelles (United States) Steve Cohen (United States) Don Walker	Ferrari 512 BB	54
59 DNF	GTU	71	(United States) Team Highball	(United States) Amos Johnson (United States) Jack Dunham (United States) Dennis Shaw	Mazda RX-7	48
60 DNF	GTU	13	(United States) Rubino Racing	(United States) Dennis Wagoner (United States) Ken Knott (United States) Frank Rubino	Mazda RX-7	46
61 DNF	GTO	69	(United States) Wonzer Racing	(United States) John Hofstra (United States) Charles Slater (United States) Mick Robinson	Porsche 911 Carrera RSR	45
62 DNF	GTU	08	(United States) Simms-Romano	(United States) Drake Olson (United States) Steve Potter (United States) Paul Romano	Mazda RX-7	44
63 DNF	GTP	95	(United States) Van Every Racing	(United States) Lance Van Every (United States) Ash Tisdelle (United States) Jack Refenning	Porsche 935	42
64 DNF	GTU	60	(United States) Tom Hunt	(United States) Tom Hunt (United States) James Shelton (United States) Dean Jameson	Mazda RX-3	40
65 DNF	GTP	3	(United States) Pegasus Racing	(United States) John Paul Jr. (United States) Ken Madren (United States) Wayne Pickering	March 84G	38
66 DNF	GTO	70	(United States) Ormond Racing Associates	(United States) Don Cummings (United States) Craig Rubright (United States) Greg Walker	Chevrolet Corvette	37
67 DNF	GTP	04	(United States) Group 44	(United Kingdom) Brian Redman (United States) Hurley Haywood	Jaguar XJR-5	36
68 DNF	GTO	50	(United States) Monty Trainer's Restaurant	(United States) Buz McCall (United States) Pancho Carter (United States) Tom Sheehy	Chevrolet Camaro	34
69 DNF	GTP	4	(United States) Lee Racing	(United States) Carson Baird (United States) Terry Labonte (United States) Billy Hagan	Chevrolet Corvette GTP	27
70 DNF	GTO	92	(United States) OMR Engines	(United States) Chris Gennone (United States) Hoyt Overbagh (United States) Fern Prego	Chevrolet Camaro	27
71 DNF	GTP	12	(Germany) Gebhardt Motorsport	(Canada) George Schwarz (Germany) Frank Jelinski (Germany) Jan Thoelke	Gebhardt JC853	22
72 DNF	GTO	66	(United States) Habersin Camera Shop	(United States) Rick Habersin (United States) Art Habersin	Chevrolet Camaro	22
73 DNF	GTO	48	(United States) Gary Wonzer	(United States) Tom Cripe (United States) Gary Wonzer (United States) Bruce Dewey	Porsche 934	9
74 DNF	GTO	32	(Canada) KJJ Enterprises	(Canada) John Bossom (Canada) Ken Hill (Canada) Reagan Riley	Triumph TR8	0
DNS	GTP	0	(United States) Gary Wonzer	(United States) Gary Wonzer (United States) Del Russo Taylor	Chevron GTP	0
DNS	GTP	6	(United States) Morgan Performance	(United States) Charles Morgan (United States) Bill Alsup	Royale RP40	0
DNS	GTO	23	(United States) Raul Garcia	(United States) Raul Garcia	Pontiac Firebird	0
DNS	GTO	77	(United States) Tortuga Racing	(United States) Carlos Munoz (United States) Joe Gonzalez	Chevrolet Camaro	0
DNS	GTU	87	(United States) Mosler Racing	(United States) George Alderman (United States) Joe Hill (United States) Steve Alexander	Ferrari 308 GTB/GTS	0

=== Class Winners ===
Class	Winners	
GTP	Foyt / Wollek	Porsche 962
Lights	Downing / Maffucci	Argo JM16
GTO	Dallenbach Jr. / Jones	Ford Mustang
GTU	Auberlen / Jauker / Gang / Eisenlohr	Porsche 911 Carrera
