= Jaguar XJR-7 =

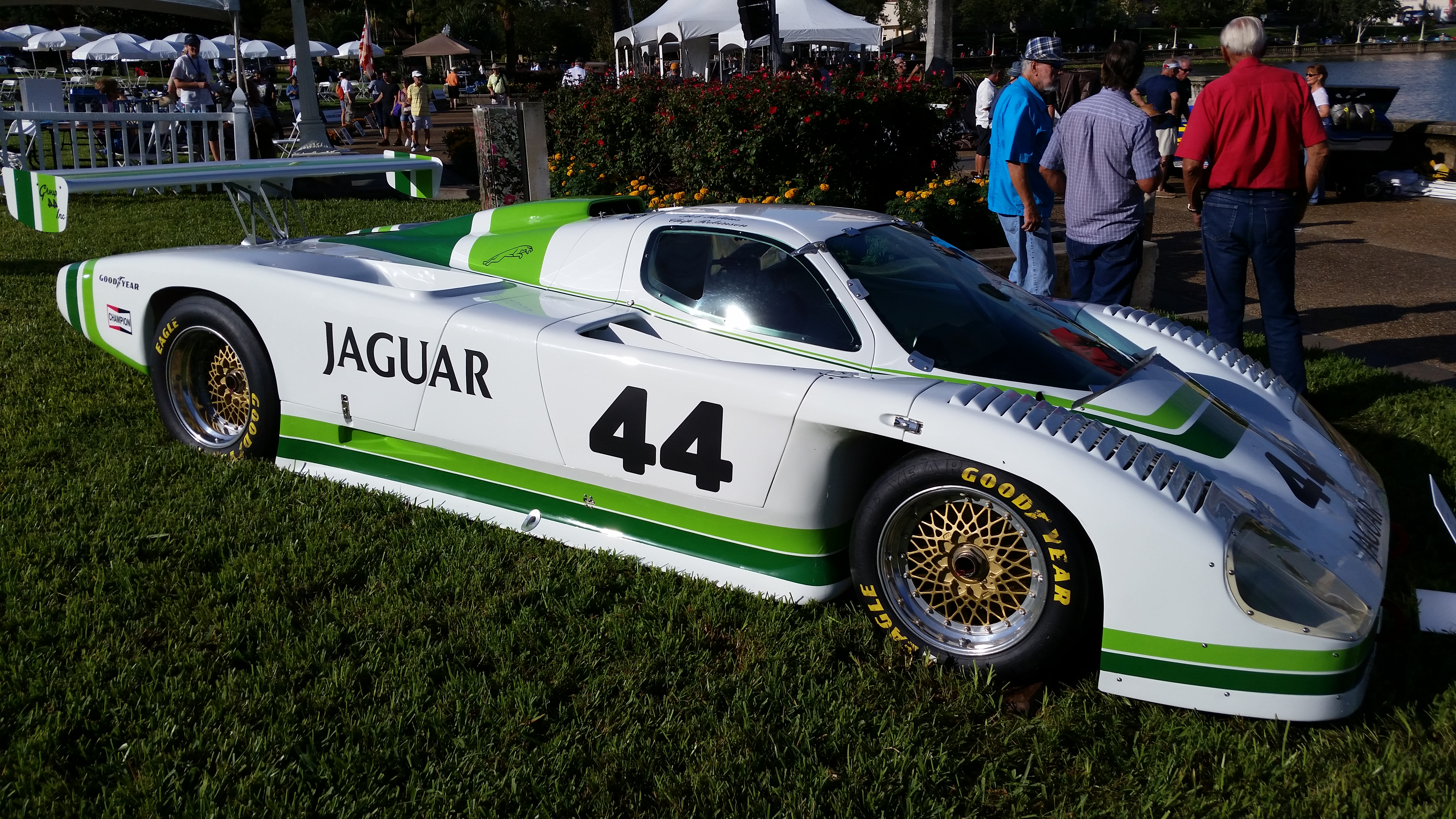
- The No. 44 XJR-7 on display in 2016
- Category: IMSA GTP
- Designer: Lee Dykstra
- Production: 1985 - 1987
- Predecessor: Jaguar XJR-5
- Successor: Jaguar XJR-9

Technical specifications
- Length: 4,750 mm (187 in)
- Width: 1,980 mm (78 in)
- Height: 1,040 mm (40.9 in)
- Wheelbase: 2,760 mm (108.7 in)
- Transmission: Hewland 5-speed manual

Competition history
- Debut: 1985 3 Hours of Daytona
- First win: 1986 3 Hours of Daytona
- Last win: 1987 West Palm Beach 3 Hours

The Jaguar XJR-7 is a IMSA GTP sports prototype race car, designed, developed, and built by Group 44, for Jaguar with the aim of competing, from 1985, in the IMSA GT Championship. Jaguar XJR-7s contested until 1988, before Jaguar replaced it with the Jaguar XJR-9.

== Wins/Victories ==
- 1986 3 Hours of Daytona
- 1987 500 km of Riverside
- 1987 West Palm Beach 3 Hours

== Drivers ==
- Claude Ballot-Lena
- Whitney Ganz
- Hurley Haywood
- John Morton
- Brian Redman
- Chip Robinson
- Vern Schuppan
- Bob Tullius

== See also ==
- Jaguar XJR Sportscars
