= Dome RC82 =

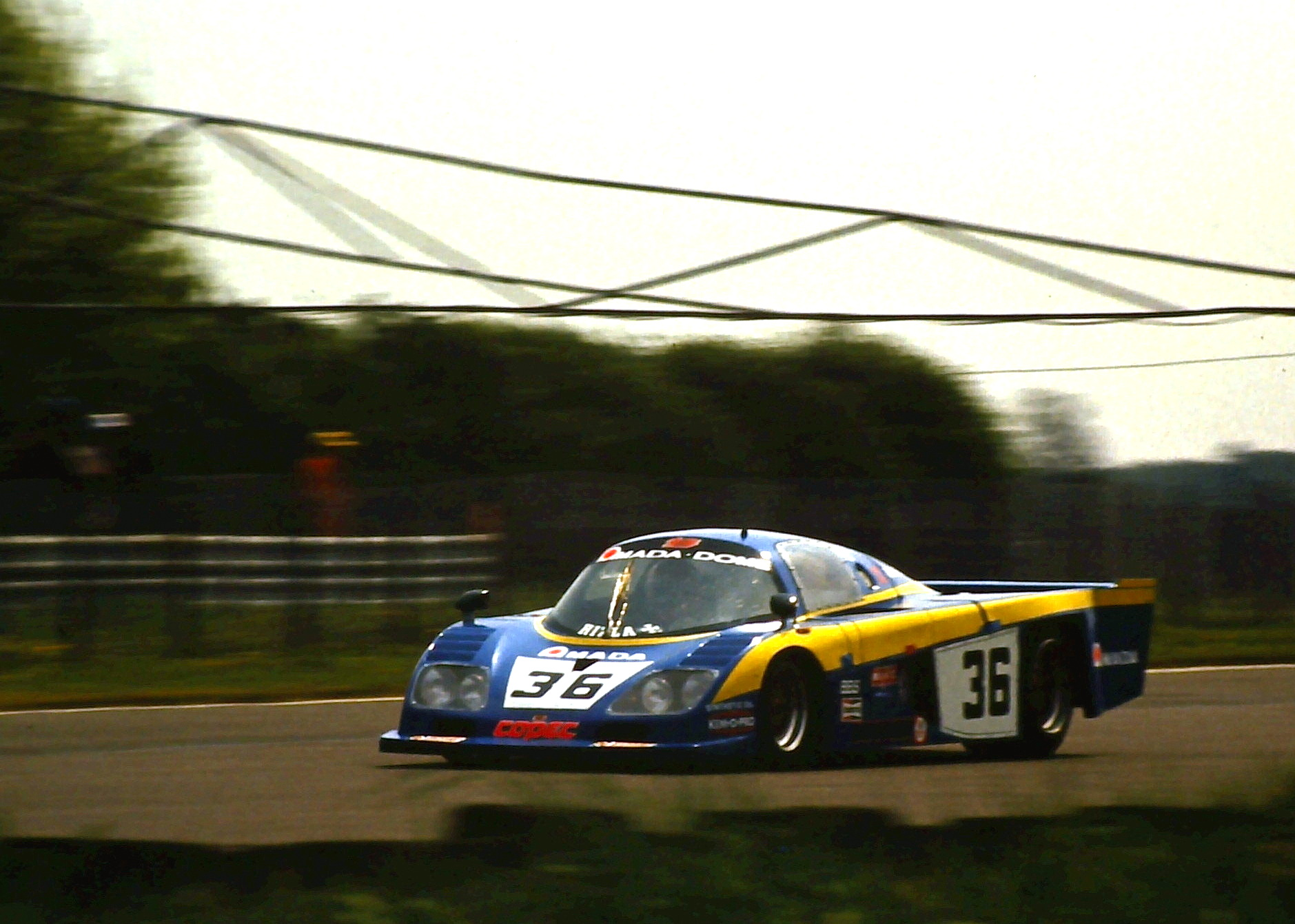
- Category: Group C1
- Constructor: Dome
- Successor: Dome RC83

Technical specifications
- Engine: 3,297 cc (201.2 cu in) naturally-aspirated Cosworth DFL V8, mid-engined 8,000 cc (488.2 cu in) naturally-aspirated Chevrolet V8
- Tyres: Dunlop

Competition history
- Notable entrants: Dome Racing; Devon Racing; Direct Car Phones
- Debut: 1982 6 Hours of Silverstone
Races	Wins	Poles	F/Laps
5 (11 entries)	0	0	0
- Teams' Championships: 0
- Constructors' Championships: 0
- Drivers' Championships: 0

The Dome RC82 was a Group C sports racing car built by Dome in 1982 for the 24 Hours of Le Mans. Initially fitted with a 3.3-litre Cosworth DFL V8 engine, the car finished its life fitted with an 8-litre Chevrolet V8 engine. March Engineering built the chassis, and one car was built. The car would prove to be unsuccessful, as it never finished a race, and was replaced by the marginally more successful Dome RC83 the following year.

== Racing history ==
=== Works career (1982–1983) ===
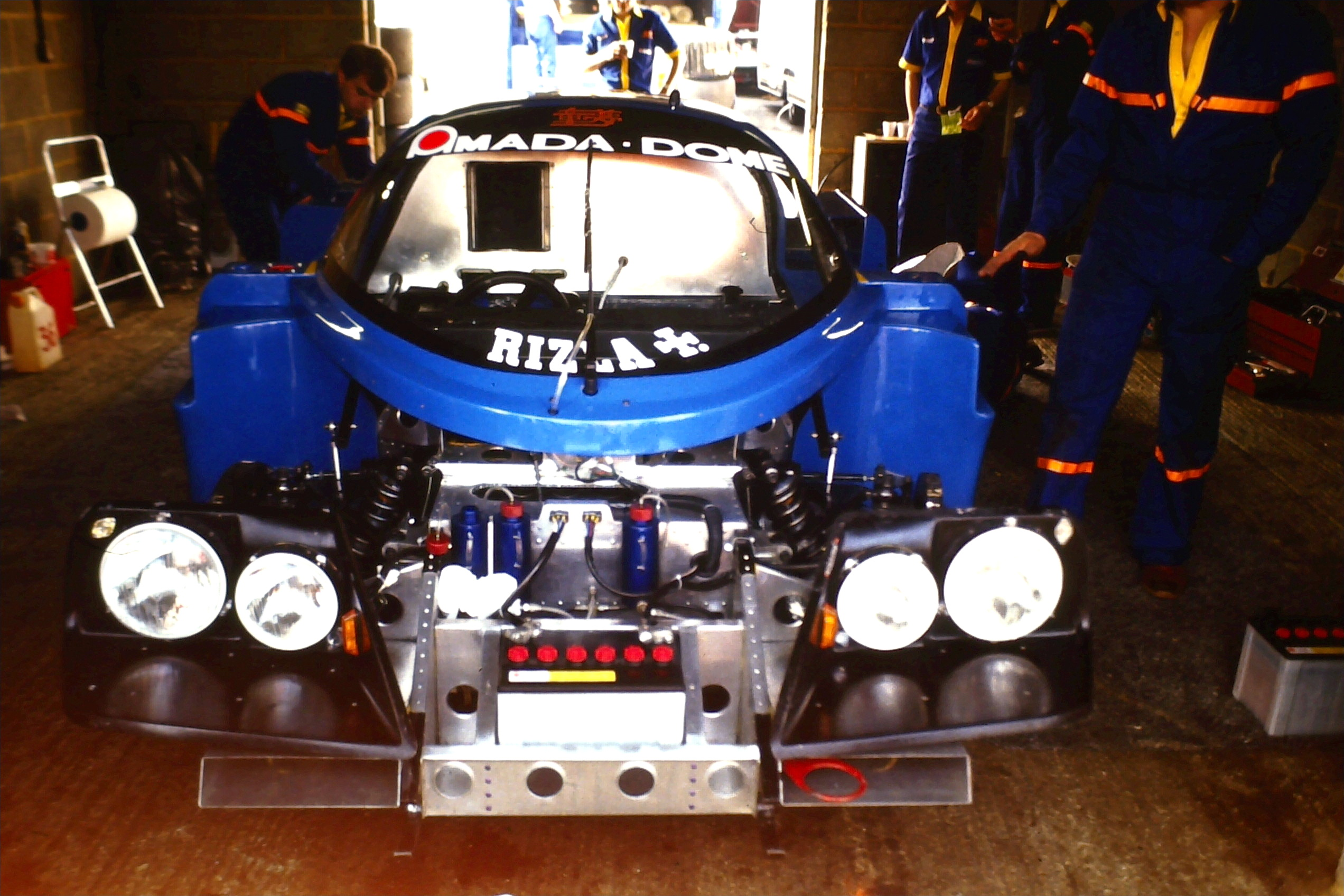
The Dome RC82 with front bodywork removed.

In 1982, Dome built the RC82 as their first effort in the new Group C category of sports car racing. The chassis was built by March Engineering, whilst the engine was a 3.3-litre Cosworth DFL V8 engine. Dome, with sponsorship from Amada, debuted the car at the 1982 6 Hours of Silverstone, and selected Chris Craft, Raul Boesel and Eliseo Salazar to drive it. It would not prove to be a successful debut, as the car succumbed to fuel pressure issues after 116 laps. Dome then entered Craft and Salazar at the 24 Hours of Le Mans, but the suspension mounting failed after 85 laps, and the team were forced to retire. The RC82 was not used again until the 1983 24 Hours of Le Mans; Nick Mason joined the team, but the car lasted 75 laps before succumbing to clutch failure. Following the race, the RC83 made its debut in the 1000 km of Fuji, with the factory phasing out the RC82.

=== Private teams (1984–1988) ===
Dome then sold the car to Dorset Racing, and the car returned to action in the 1984 1000 km of Silverstone, where Richard Jones, Mark Galvin and John Williams were selected to drive it; this time, a valve in the Cosworth DFL engine broke after 46 laps, and the team retired. Nick Faure replaced Williams for the 24 Hours of Le Mans, but the RC82's woeful reliability record continued, as the oil pressure dropped in the engine, forcing the team out after 156 laps. Dorset Racing attempted to run Martin Birrane and Tony Birchenhough at both the 1985 24 Hours of Le Mans and the 1985 1000 km of Hockenheim, but did not attend either race. The team made one final attempt to run the RC82 at the 24 Hours of Le Mans in 1986, but again failed to make the race.

Mark Hales then bought the car, fitted it with a Chevrolet V8 engine, and attempted to run it twice in the Thundersports series 1987, at the Oulton Park and Donington Park rounds, but this never happened. In 1988, the RC82 was used in a race weekend for the first time in four years, as Hales entered himself and Bill Hall in the car at the Oulton Park round of the Thundersports series, under the Direct Car Phones banner; the 8-litre Chevrolet V8 engine failed, and prevented the team from starting the race. The car's last ever entry came at the Brands Hatch round of the Thundersports series, but the team did not attend the event, and the RC82's career ended with it never having finished a race.
