= Dome RC83 =

- Category: Group C1
- Constructor: Dome
- Predecessor: Dome RC82
- Successor: Dome 84C

Technical specifications
- Engine: Cosworth DFL 3,955 cc (241.3 cu in) V8, naturally-aspirated, mid-engined
- Tyres: Dunlop

Competition history
- Notable entrants: Dome Motorsport
- Debut: 1983 1000 km of Fuji
| Races | Wins | Poles | F/Laps |
|---|---|---|---|
| 5 (8 entries) | 0 | 0 | 0 |
- Teams' Championships: 0
- Constructors' Championships: 0
- Drivers' Championships: 0

The Dome RC83 was a Group C sports racing car built by Dome in 1983. A replacement for the RC82, which had been unsuccessful in its two 1982 entries, the car featured a 4-litre Cosworth DFL V8 engine and was developed in-house, unlike the RC82, which had a March Engineering chassis. One car was built. The car was replaced by the Dome 84C partway through the 1984 season, although the two cars did overlap during that year.

== Racing history ==
=== 1983 ===
Following the failure of the Dome RC82 to finish a race in any of its three entries, Dome built the RC83 in 1983. It used a bigger 4-litre version of the Cosworth DFL V8 engine that had previously been used in the RC82, and also featured a chassis built in-house by Dome, instead of the March Engineering unit used in the RC82. Racing under the Autobacs Dome Motorsport banner, the car was entered in the 1983 1000 km of Fuji, part of the Fuji Long Distance Series, with Eje Elgh and Tiff Needell selected to drive it. It was not a successful debut, as the transmission failed after 31 laps, and the team were forced to retire from the race. The car was then entered in the 1000 km of Suzuka (part of the All Japan Endurance Championship), and the team finished fourth; last of all of the Group C finishers, but only five laps behind the victorious Trust Racing Team-entered Porsche 956. Next up was the second 1000 km of Fuji race of 1983, which formed part of both the FIA World Endurance Championship and the All Japan Endurance Championship; the team finished the race, but 148 laps was not sufficient for Needell and Elgh to be classified. Stanley Dickens replaced Needell for the 500 miles of Fuji, which rounded out the 1983 Fuji Long Distance Series season; a seventh-place finish was the result of the team's efforts.

=== 1984 ===
Dickens and Elgh were retained for the start of the 1984 campaign, but the team were unable to start the 500 km of Suzuka due to an issue with the car's metering unit. Both drivers were then entered in the 24 Hours of Le Mans, but an accident in practice prevented them from starting the race. For the 1000 km of Suzuka, the new Dome 84C-Toyota made its debut, with Dickens and Elgh being selected to drive it; instead, Kaoru Hoshino, Aguri Suzuki and Shinji Uchida were selected to drive the RC83. However, another accident forced the team to retire the RC83 after 50 laps. Suzuki was partnered by Rupert Keegan for the 1000 km of Fuji, but another accident in practice prevented the team from making the race. This would be the last time the RC83 was used in a race.
