= Hurley Haywood =

American racecar driver (born 1948)

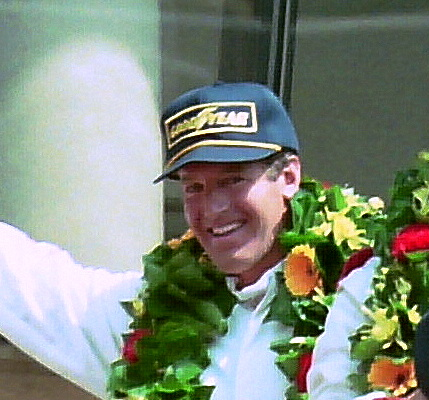
- Haywood in 1994
- Nationality: (United States) American
- Born: Harris Hurley Haywood; May 4, 1948 (age 78) Chicago, Illinois, U.S.

24 Hours of Le Mans career
- Years: 1977–1983, 1985–1987, 1990–1991, 1993–1994
- Best finish: 1st (1977, 1983, 1994)
- Class wins: 3 (1977, 1983, 1994)

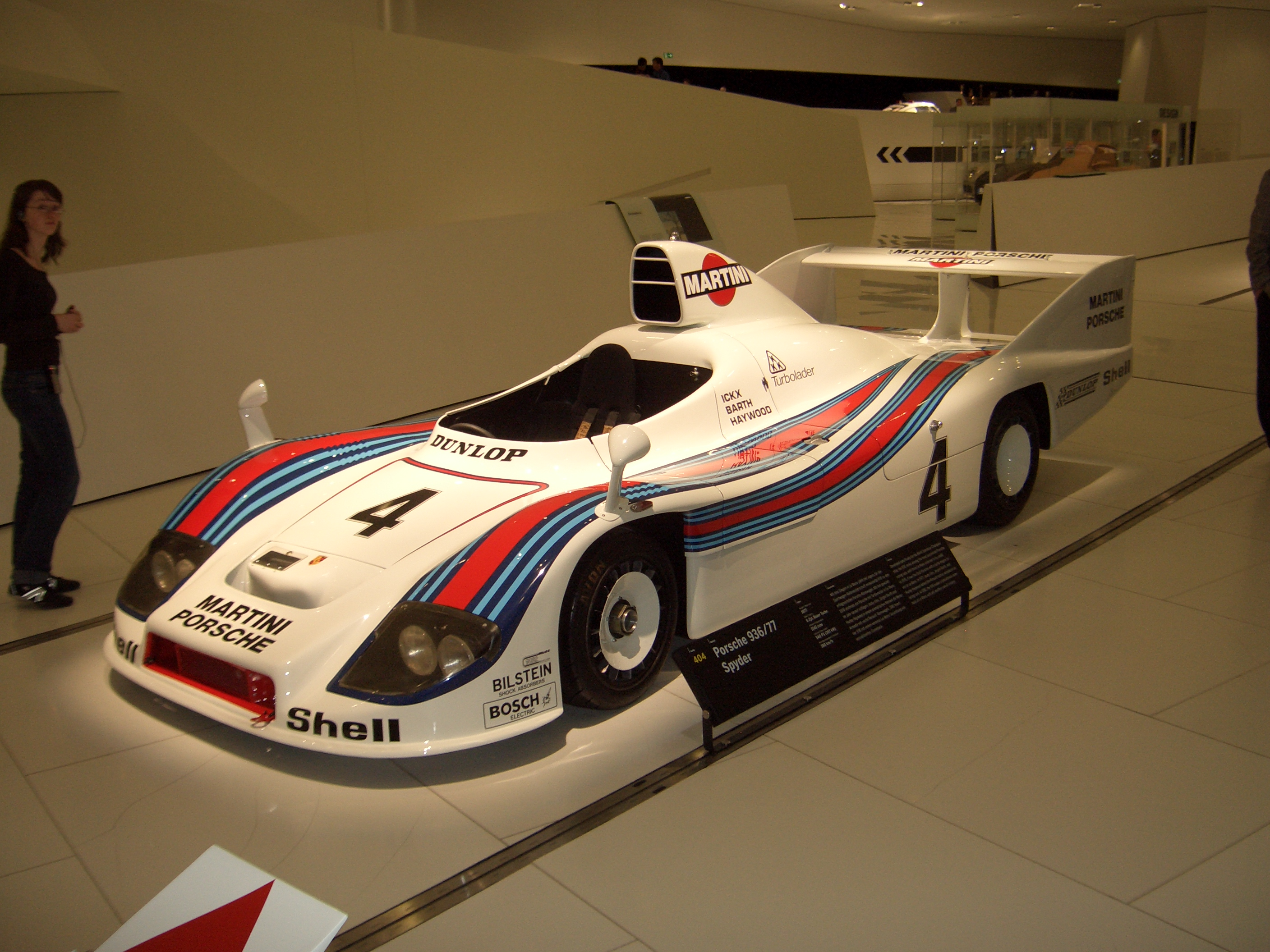
The Porsche 936 which Hurley Haywood drove to victory at the 1977 24 Hour of Le Mans

Harris Hurley Haywood (born May 4, 1948) is an American former race car driver. Haywood has won multiple events, including five overall victories at the 24 Hours of Daytona, three at the 24 Hours of Le Mans, and two at the 12 Hours of Sebring and was the fifth driver to complete the informal triple Crown of endurance racing. He is credited with the 1988 Trans-Am title, two IMSA GT Championship titles and 23 wins, three Norelco Cup championships, a SuperCar title and five IndyCar starts.

Haywood won the 24 Hours of Le Mans in 1977 (Porsche 936), 1983 (Porsche 956) and 1994 (Dauer 962 Le Mans) and is tied as the most successful driver at the 24 Hours of Daytona with five wins (1973, 1975, 1977, 1979, and 1991). He won the 12 Hours of Sebring in 1973 and 1981. He also drove in the 1980 Indianapolis 500, where he finished in 18th. He represented IMSA four times in the International Race of Champions (1986, 1989, 1992, 1995). In 1970, he was drafted into the army where he served as Specialist 4 with the 164th Aviation Group near Saigon during the Vietnam War. After completing his tour of duty, he won his first IMSA GT title in 1971.

After Peter H. Gregg's death, Haywood was a spokesperson and executive with Brumos Automotive dealerships.

Haywood is the honorary chief driving instructor at the Porsche Track Experience, held at the Barber Motorsports Park outside Birmingham, Alabama. Patrick Dempsey produced a documentary film, Hurley, about Haywood's life.

In honor of his historical achievements, Haywood was invited to perform the ceremonial duties of Grand Marshal at the 2019 24 Hours of Le Mans.

== Personal life ==
Haywood served in the 164th Aviation Group during the Vietnam War.

In February 2018, Haywood publicly came out as gay in his autobiography Hurley: From The Beginning.

In June 2019, to mark the 50th anniversary of the Stonewall riots, an event widely considered a watershed moment in the modern LGBTQ rights movement, Queerty named Haywood one of the Pride50 "trailblazing individuals who actively ensure society remains moving towards equality, acceptance and dignity for all queer people".

== Awards ==
Haywood was inducted into the Motorsports Hall of Fame of America in 2005.

== Racing results ==
=== 24 Hours of Le Mans results ===
Year	Team	Co-Drivers	Car	Class	Laps	Pos.	Class Pos.
1977	(Germany) Martini Racing Porsche System	(Germany) Jürgen Barth (Belgium) Jacky Ickx	Porsche 936/77	S +2.0	342	**1st**	**1st**
1978	(Germany) Martini Racing Porsche System	(United States) Peter Gregg (Germany) Reinhold Joest	Porsche 936/77	S +2.0	362	**3rd**	**3rd**
1980	(United States) Sun System (United States) Whittington Brothers Racing	(United States) Don Whittington (United States) Dale Whittington	Porsche 935 K3	IMSA	151	DNF	DNF
1981	(Germany) Porsche System	(Germany) Jochen Mass (Australia) Vern Schuppan	Porsche 936	S +2.0	312	12th	**2nd**
1982	(Germany) Rothmans Porsche System	(United States) Al Holbert (Germany) Jürgen Barth	Porsche 956	C	340	**3rd**	**3rd**
1983	(Germany) Rothmans Porsche	(Australia) Vern Schuppan (United States) Al Holbert	Porsche 956	C	370	**1st**	**1st**
1985	(United States) Jaguar Group 44	(United Kingdom) Brian Redman (United States) Jim Adams	Jaguar XJR-5	GTP	151	DNF	DNF
1986	(United Kingdom) Silk Cut Jaguar (United Kingdom) Tom Walkinshaw Racing	(Italy) Gianfranco Brancatelli (United Kingdom) Win Percy	Jaguar XJR-6	C1	154	DNF	DNF
1987	(Germany) Joest Racing	(Germany) Frank Jelinski (Sweden) Stanley Dickens (South Africa) Sarel van der Merwe	Porsche 962C	C1	7	DNF	DNF
1990	(Australia) Team Schuppan (Australia) Omron Racing	(South Africa) Wayne Taylor (Sweden) Rickard Rydell	Porsche 962C	C1	332	12th	12th
1991	(Switzerland) Team Salamin Primagaz (Australia) Team Schuppan	(United Kingdom) James Weaver (South Africa) Wayne Taylor	Porsche 962C	C2	316	NC	NC
1993	(Germany) Le Mans Porsche Team	(Germany) Walter Röhrl (Germany) Hans-Joachim Stuck	Porsche 911 Turbo S LM-GT	GT	79	DNF	DNF
1994	(Germany) Le Mans Porsche Team (Germany) Joest Racing	(France) Yannick Dalmas (Italy) Mauro Baldi	Dauer 962 Le Mans	GT1	344	**1st**	**1st**

=== 24 Hours of Daytona results ===
Year	Team	Co-drivers	Car	Class	Laps	Pos.	Class Pos.
1971	(United States) Brumos Porsche Audi Corp.	(United States) Peter Gregg	Porsche 914/6	GT2.5	260	DNF	DNF
1972	(United States) Brumos Porsche Audi Corp.	(United States) Peter Gregg	Porsche 911 S	GT2.5	166	7th	**1st**
1973	(United States) Brumos Porsche	(United States) Peter Gregg	Porsche Carrera RSR	S3.0	641	**1st**	**1st**
1975	(United States) Brumos Racing	(United States) Peter Gregg	Porsche Carrera RSR	GTO	684	**1st**	**1st**
1976	(United States) Brumos Porsche	(United States) Jim Busby	Porsche Carrera RSR	GTO	530	**3rd**	**3rd**
1977	(United States) Ecurie Escargot	(United States) John Graves (United States) Dave Helmick	Porsche Carrera RSR	GTO	681	**1st**	**1st**
1978	(United States) Bob Hagestad	(United States) Bob Hagestad (United States) Doc Bundy	Porsche 935	GTX	400	DNF	DNF
1979	(United States) Interscope Racing	(United States) Ted Field (United States) Danny Ongais	Porsche 935/79	GTX	684	**1st**	**1st**
1980	(United States) Brumos Porsche Audi	(United States) Peter Gregg (United States) Bruce Leven	Porsche 935/79	GTX	584	11th	7th
1981	(United States) Bayside Disposal Racing	(Germany) Jürgen Barth (United States) Bruce Leven	Porsche 935/80	GTX	232	DNF	DNF
1982	(United States) Bayside Disposal Racing	(United States) Bruce Leven (United States) Al Holbert	Porsche 935/80	GTP	598	13th	5th
1983	(United States) Bayside Disposal Racing	(United States) Bruce Leven (United States) Al Holbert	Porsche 935/80	GTP	515	DNF	DNF
1984	(United States) Bayside Disposal Racing	(United States) Al Holbert (France) Claude Ballot-Léna (United States) Bruce Leven	Porsche 935/80	GTP	604	4th	4th
1985	(United States) Group 44	(United Kingdom) Brian Redman (United States) Bob Tullius	Jaguar XJR-5	GTP	203	DNF	DNF
1986	(United States) Group 44	(Australia) Vern Schuppan (United Kingdom) Brian Redman	Jaguar XJR-7	GTP	430	DNF	DNF
1987	(United States) Group 44	(United States) Bob Tullius (United States) John Morton	Jaguar XJR-7	GTP	122	DNF	DNF
1988	(United States) Group 44	(United States) Bob Tullius (United States) Whitney Ganz	Jaguar XJR-7	GTP	216	DNF	DNF
1990	(United States) Alucraft/Shapiro Motorsports	(Germany) Hans-Joachim Stuck (Germany) Harald Grohs (Switzerland) René Herzog	Porsche 962	GTP	704	4th	4th
1991	(Germany) Joest Racing	(Germany) Frank Jelinski (France) Henri Pescarolo (France) Bob Wollek (Germany) "John Winter"	Porsche 962 C	GTP	719	**1st**	**1st**
1992	(Australia) Team 0123	(Austria) Roland Ratzenberger (Sweden) Eje Elgh (United States) Scott Brayton	Porsche 962	GTP	749	**3rd**	**2nd**
1993	(Germany) Joest Porsche	(United States) Chip Robinson (France) Henri Pescarolo (United States) Danny Sullivan	Porsche 962 C	GTP	258	DNF	DNF
1994	(United States) Brumos Porsche	(Germany) Walter Röhrl (United States) Danny Sullivan (Germany) Hans-Joachim Stuck	Porsche 964 Turbo GT America	GTS	467	DNF	DNF
1995	(United States) Rohr Corp.	(United States) David Murry (Germany) Bernd Mayländer (United States) Jochen Rohr	Porsche 911 GT2	GTS-1	655	4th	**2nd**
1996	(United States) Rohr Corp.	(Canada) Scott Goodyear (United States) John O'Steen (United States) David Murry	Porsche 911 GT2 Evo	GTS-1	284	DNF	DNF
1997	(United States) Jim Matthews Racing	(United States) Jim Matthews (United States) David Murry (United States) Doc Bundy	Porsche 911	GTS-3	638	10th	**2nd**
1998	(United States) Colucci/Matthews Racing	(United States) David Murry (United Kingdom) Derek Bell (United States) Jim Matthews	Riley & Scott Mk III Ford	CA	550	DNF	DNF
1999	(United States) DLW Racing Inc.	(United States) Don Whittington (United States) Dale Whittington (United States) Danny Sullivan	Riley & Scott Mk III Ford	CA	550	23rd	10th
2000	(United States) 74 Ranch Resort	(United States) George Robinson (United States) Jack Baldwin (United States) Irv Hoerr	Riley & Scott Mk III Chevrolet	SR	495	35th	6th
2001	(United States) Champion Racing	(United States) Dorsey Schroeder (France) Bob Wollek (Germany) Sascha Maassen	Lola B2K/10 Porsche	SRP	209	DNF	DNF
2002	(United States) Champion Racing	(United Kingdom) Andy Wallace (Germany) Sascha Maassen (Germany) Lucas Luhr	Lola B2K/10 Porsche	SRP	681	4th	**3rd**
2003	(United States) Brumos Porsche	(United States) J. C. France (Canada) Scott Goodyear (United States) Scott Sharp	Fabcar FDSC/03 Porsche	DP	661	5th	**2nd**
2004	(United States) Brumos Racing	(United States) J. C. France (United States) Scott Sharp (United States) Tommy Riggins	Fabcar FDSC/03 Porsche	DP	343	DNF	DNF
2005	(United States) Brumos Racing	(United States) J. C. France (Germany) Timo Bernhard (Germany) Mike Rockenfeller; Romain Dumas	Fabcar FDSC/03 Porsche	DP	432	DNF	DNF
2006	(United States) Brumos Racing	(United States) J. C. France (Portugal) João Barbosa (United States) Ted Christopher	Fabcar FDSC/03 Porsche	DP	559	DNF	DNF
2007	(United States) Brumos Porsche/Kendall	(United States) J. C. France (Portugal) João Barbosa (Brazil) Roberto Moreno (United States) David Donohue	Riley Mk XI Porsche	DP	662	4th	4th
2007	(United States) Red Bull/Brumos Porsche	(United States) David Donohue (United States) Darren Law (United States) Buddy Rice (United States) Scott Sharp	Riley Mk XI Porsche	DP	542	40th	20th
2008	(United States) Brumos Racing	(United States) J. C. France (Portugal) João Barbosa (United States) Terry Borcheller	Riley Mk XI Porsche	DP	622	23rd	11th
2009	(United States) Brumos Racing	(United States) J. C. France (Portugal) João Barbosa (United States) Terry Borcheller	Riley Mk XI Porsche	DP	735	**3rd**	**3rd**
2010	(United States) Brumos Racing	(United States) David Donohue (United States) Darren Law (United States) Butch Leitzinger (Brazil) Raphael Matos	Riley Mk XI Porsche	DP	582	DNF	DNF
2011	(United States) Brumos Racing	(United States) Andrew Davis (United States) Leh Keen (Germany) Marc Lieb	Porsche 997 GT3 Cup	GT	673	17th	5th
2012	(United States) Brumos Racing	(United States) Leh Keen (United States) Andrew Davis (Germany) Marc Lieb	Porsche 997 GT3 Cup	GT	726	13th	**3rd**

=== PPG Indycar Series ===
(key) (Races in bold indicate pole position)

Year	Team	1	2	3	4	5	6	7	8	9	10	11	12	Rank	Points	Ref
1980	Lindsey Hopkins Racing	ONT	INDY; 18	MIL	POC	MDO	MCH	WGL	MIL	ONT	MCH	MEX	PHX	**52nd**	**20**	

Sporting positions
Preceded by None	IMSA GT champion 1971–1972	Succeeded by Peter Gregg
Preceded by Jacky Ickx; Gijs van Lennep	Winner of the 24 Hours of Le Mans; 1977 with: Jacky Ickx; Jürgen Barth	Succeeded by Jean-Pierre Jaussaud; Didier Pironi
Preceded by Jacky Ickx; Derek Bell	Winner of the 24 Hours of Le Mans; 1983 with: Vern Schuppan; Al Holbert	Succeeded by Klaus Ludwig; Henri Pescarolo
Preceded by Scott Pruett	Trans-Am Series champion 1988	Succeeded by Dorsey Schroeder
Preceded by Geoff Brabham; Christophe Bouchut; Éric Hélary	Winner of the 24 Hours of Le Mans; 1994 with: Yannick Dalmas; Mauro Baldi	Succeeded by Yannick Dalmas; JJ Lehto; Masanori Sekiya
