= Jaguar XJR-5 =

IMSA GTP sports prototype race car

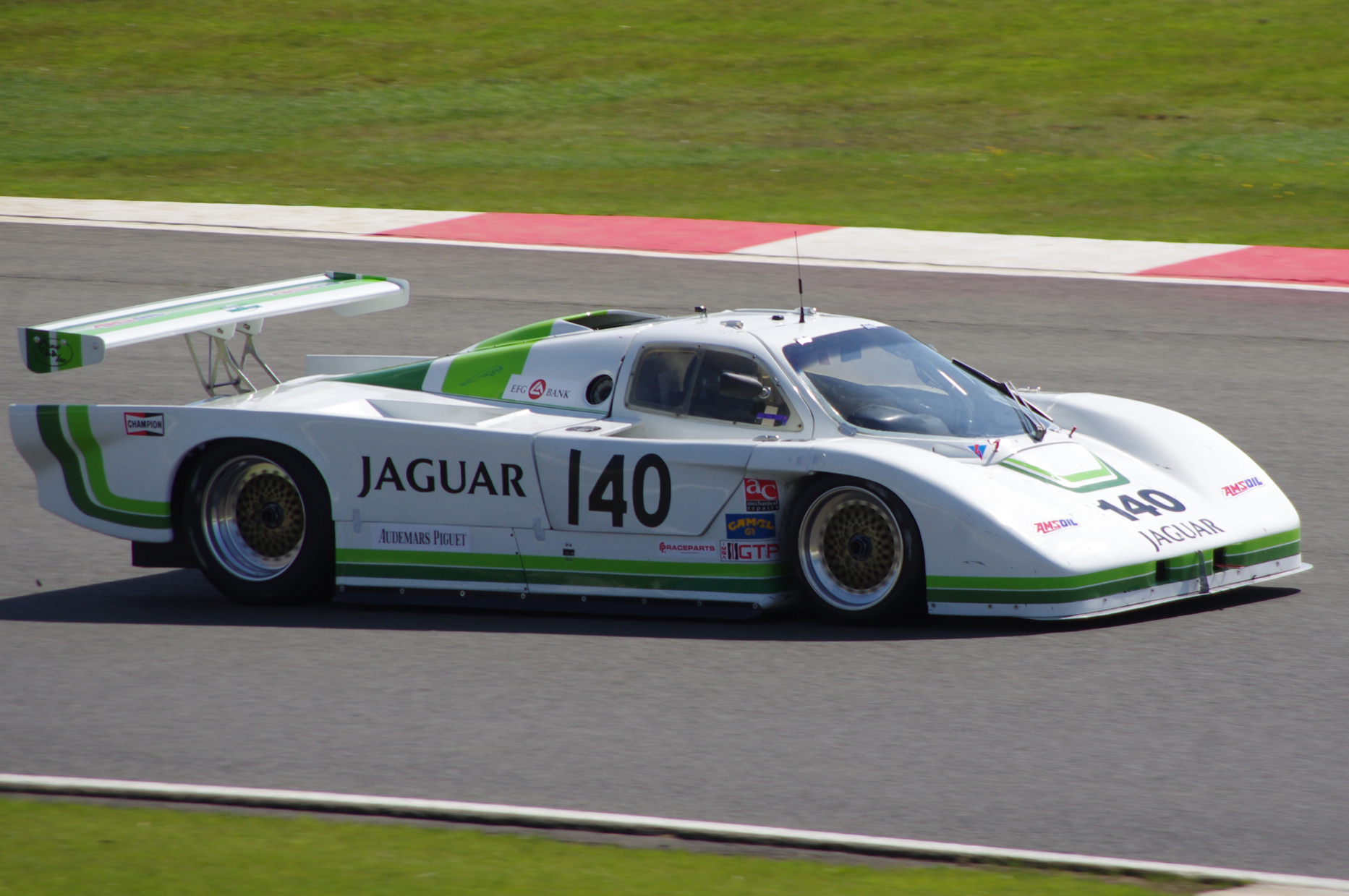
Jaguar XJR-5B

The Jaguar XJR-5 is a IMSA GTP sports prototype race car, designed, developed and built by Group 44 racing for Jaguar with the aim of competing, from 1982, in the IMSA GT Championship. Jaguar XJR-5s contested until 1985, before Jaguar replaced it with the Jaguar XJR-7.

== Origins and history ==
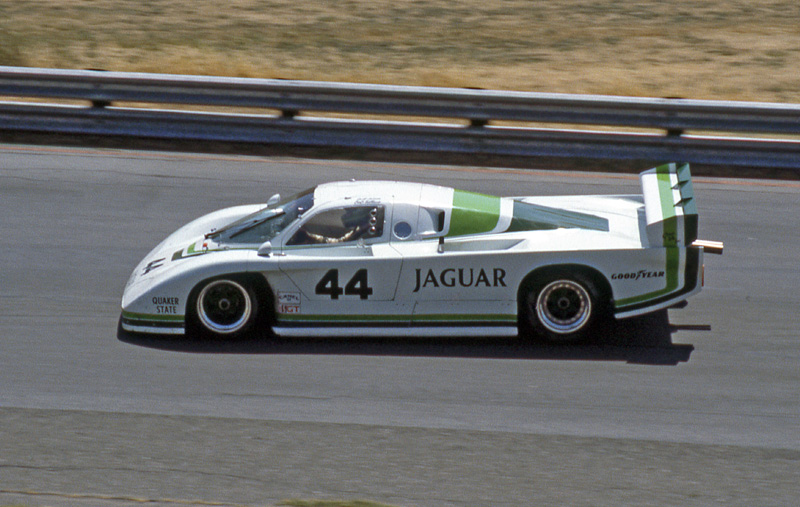
Jaguar XJR-5

In the late 1970s, CEO John Egan wanted to initiate a racing program to boost sales of the Jaguar which was falling sharply at that historic time, especially in the US market. So he consulted Jaguar executive director in the United States Mike Dale about a car for IMSA's new GTP prototype class and the 24 Hours of Le Mans. Bob Tullius and his Group 44 team were contacted after the Triumph TR8 racing program had just ended. The car was designed by Lee Dykstra, together with Max Schenkel and Randy Wittine, who were experts in aerodynamics. The XJR-5 was completed and presented in August 1982.

For the development and design of the vehicle, a computerized system was used together with a scale model used in the wind tunnel to test and design the aerodynamics of the vehicle.

The first victory came with the Group 44 team in 1984 at the Miami Grand Prix.

The engine was a roughly 600hp V12 which propelled the car up to around 230mph. In its first season of the IMSA GT championship, it achieved four race wins.

== Wins/Victories ==
- 1983 500 km of Atlanta
- 1983 3 Hours of Lime Rock
- 1983 6 Hours of Mosport
- 1983 50 miles of Pocono
- 1984 Miami 3 Hours
- 1985 500 km of Atlanta

== See also ==
- Jaguar XJR Sportscars
