= Sebring International Raceway =

Motorsport track in the United States

- Grand Prix Road Course (1999–present)
- Location: Highlands County, east of Sebring, Florida, U.S.
- Coordinates: 27°27′18″N 81°21′00″W
- Capacity: open seating without capacity limitation
- FIA Grade: 2
- Owner: NASCAR via IMSA Holdings, LLC (September 2012–present)
- Operator: Sebring International Raceway, LLC (1997–present)
- Opened: December 31, 1950; 75 years ago
- Major events: Current: IMSA WeatherTech SportsCar Championship; 12 Hours of Sebring (1950–present); GT World Challenge America (2001–2009, 2021–2026); Trans-Am Series (1966–1968, 1999–2001, 2011, 2013–present); Ferrari Challenge North America (2019–2020, 2026); Former: FIA WEC; 1000 Miles of Sebring (2019, 2022–2023); Formula One; United States Grand Prix (1959); FIA GT (1997)
- Website: http://www.sebringraceway.com/

GP Road Course (8th variation) (1999–present)
- Surface: Asphalt/Concrete
- Length: 3.740 mi (6.019 km)
- Turns: 17
- Race lap record: 1:41.800 ( (Japan) Kamui Kobayashi, Toyota TS050 Hybrid, 2019, LMP1)

School Circuit (1998–present)
- Length: 2.000 mi (3.219 km)
- Turns: 9
- Race lap record: 1:29.153 ( (New Zealand) Jacob Douglas, Tatuus JR-23, 2023, USFJ)

Johnson Club Circuit (1998–present)
- Length: 1.700 mi (2.736 km)
- Turns: 13
- Race lap record: 1:06.358 ( (United States) Jack Jeffers, Tatuus JR-23, 2024, USFJ)

7th variation (1996–1998)
- Length: 3.600 mi (5.794 km)
- Turns: 13
- Race lap record: 1:51.867 ( (Italy) Andrea Montermini, Ferrari 333 SP, 1997, WSC)

6th variation (1991–1995)
- Length: 3.700 mi (5.954 km)
- Turns: 18
- Race lap record: 1:49.616 ( (Australia) Geoff Brabham, Nissan NPT-91 A, 1992, IMSA GTP)

5th variation (1987–1990)
- Length: 4.110 mi (6.614 km)
- Turns: 17
- Race lap record: 1:58.582 ( (Australia) Geoff Brabham, Nissan GTP ZX-Turbo, 1990, IMSA GTP)

4th variation (1984–1986)
- Length: 4.860 mi (7.821 km)
- Turns: 17
- Race lap record: 2:13.857 ( (United Kingdom) Derek Bell, Porsche 962, 1986, IMSA GTP)

3rd variation (1983)
- Length: 4.750 mi (7.644 km)
- Turns: 16
- Race lap record: 2:12.750 ( (United States) Bill Whittington, March 83G, 1983, IMSA GTP)

2nd variation (1967–1982)
- Length: 5.200 mi (8.369 km)
- Turns: 17
- Race lap record: 2:28.630 ( (United States) John Paul Jr., Porsche 935, 1981, IMSA GTP)

Original short road course (1969–1970)
- Length: 2.200 mi (3.540 km)
- Turns: 5
- Race lap record: 1:04.800 ( (United Kingdom) David Hobbs, Surtees TS5, 1969, F5000)

1st variation (1952–1966)
- Length: 5.192 mi (8.356 km)
- Turns: 17
- Race lap record: 2:54.800 ( (United States) Dan Gurney, Ford GT40 Mk.II, 1966, Group 4)

Original circuit (1950–1951)
- Length: 3.500 mi (5.632 km)
- Turns: 12

Sebring International Raceway is a road course auto racing facility in the southeastern United States, located near Sebring, Florida.

Sebring Raceway is one of the oldest continuously operating race tracks in the U.S., its first race being run in 1950. Sebring is one of the classic race tracks in North American sports car racing, and plays host to the 12 Hours of Sebring.

The raceway occupies a portion of Sebring Regional Airport (an active airport for private and commercial traffic that was originally built as Hendricks Army Airfield, which was a World War II training base for the United States Army Air Forces).

== History ==
Previous logo

Sebring Raceway occupies the site of Hendricks Army Airfield (a training base for B-17 pilots in operation from 1941 to 1946), in the middle of southern Florida, 70 mi (110 km) south and southeast respectively of Orlando and Tampa, and 140 mi (230 km) northwest of Miami. After the war, Russian-American aeronautical engineer Alec Ulmann was seeking sites for converting military aircraft to civilian use when he discovered potential in Hendricks' runways and service roads to stage a sports car endurance race similar to the 24 Hours of Le Mans, a race Ulmann was inspired to somewhat re-create in the United States. Sebring's first race was held on New Year's Eve of 1950, attracting thirty race cars from across North America. The Sam Collier 6 Hour Memorial race was won by Frits Koster and Ralph Deshon in a Crosley Hot Shot that had been driven to the track by Victor Sharpe.

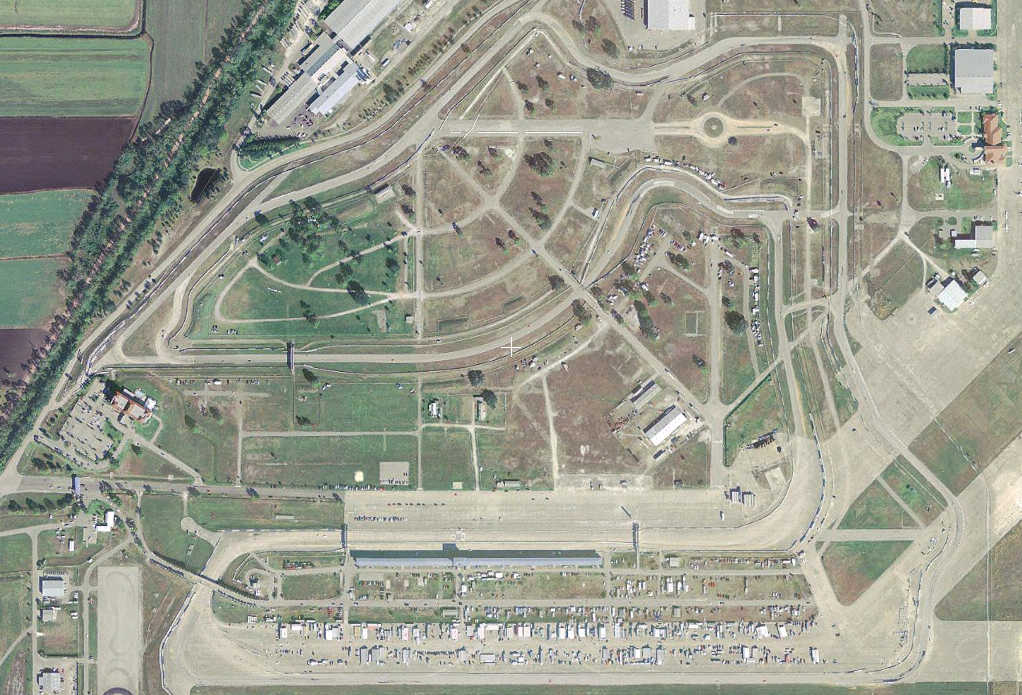
Aerial map of Sebring International Raceway

The first 12 Hours of Sebring was held on March 15, 1952, soon growing into a major international race. In 1959, the track hosted the U.S.' first Formula One race (the successor to historic European Grand Prix motor racing), held as that year's instalment of the historic United States Grand Prix competition (although the Indianapolis 500 was an official part of the Formula One World Championship from 1950 to 1960, the 500 was never considered a true Grand Prix by the European and British based teams who largely ignored it at the time). However poor attendance and high costs relocated the next U.S. Grand Prix to Riverside International Raceway in southern California.

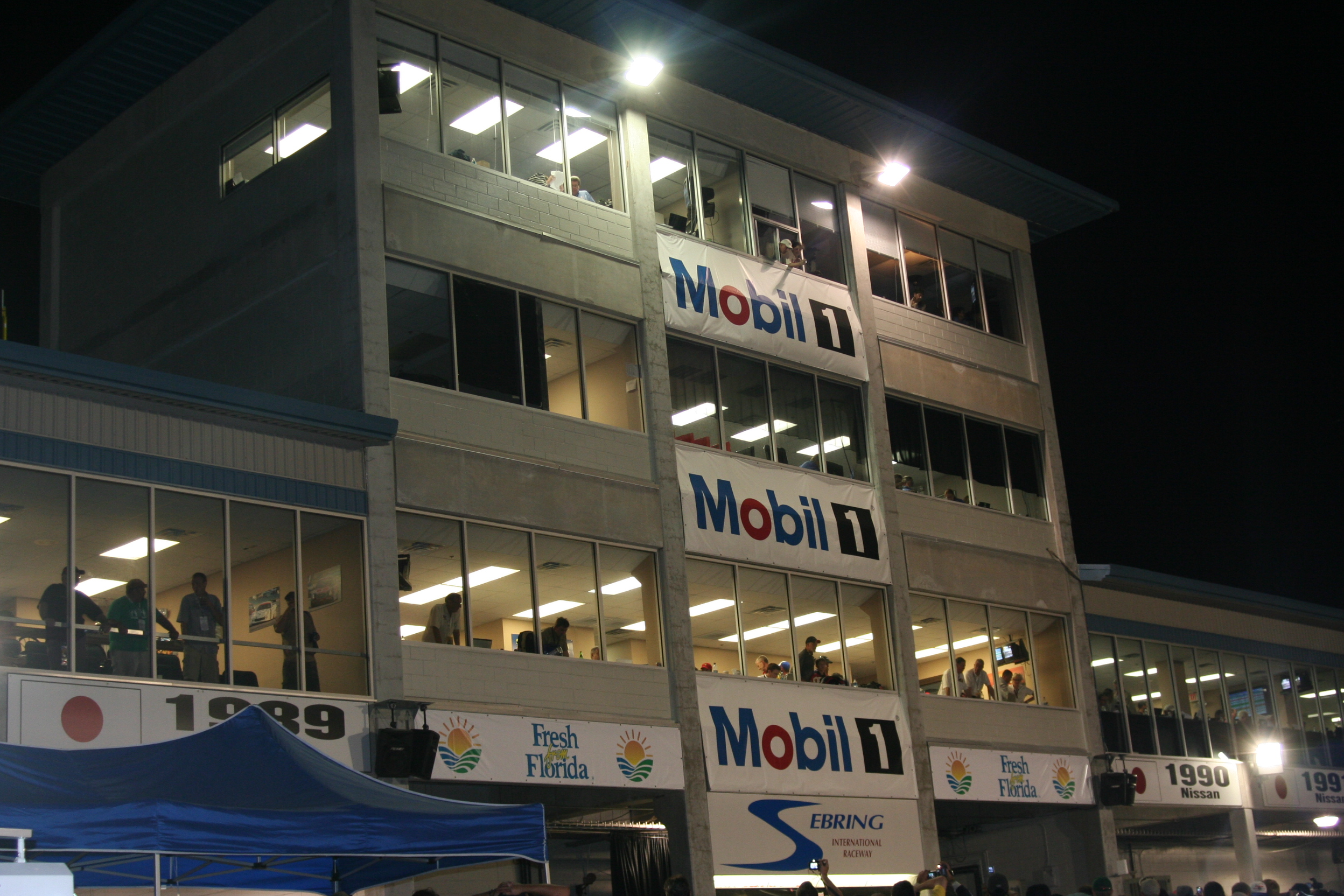
Press box

For much of Sebring's history, the track followed a 5.200 mi (8.369 km) layout. After a disastrous 1966 12 Hours with five fatalities, the track was widened in parts and also lengthened a total of 50 yd (46 m) for 1967 with the removal of the Webster Turn between the hairpin and the top of the track and replacement with the faster Green Park Chicane, further down the track. This was closer to the hairpin and allowed a flat-out run through a very fast corner to the top of the track and the runway. This was done to move the track off the dangerous Warehouse Straight and the warehouses, hangars and airplanes flanking it; a crash during that 1966 12 Hours involved a privately entered Porsche that went into one of the warehouses (this area was off-limits to non-track personnel) and into a crowd, killing four spectators.

The circuit was changed and shortened in 1983 to allow simultaneous use of the track and one of the runways, and major changes in 1987 allowed use of another runway. Further changes in 1991 accommodated expansion of the airport's facilities, allowing the entire track to be used without interfering with normal airport operations and bringing it close to its current configuration. The hairpin was removed in 1997 due to a lack of run-off, and replaced with what became known as the "safety pin". Gendebien Bend was also re-profiled to slow the cars' entry to the Ullman straight.

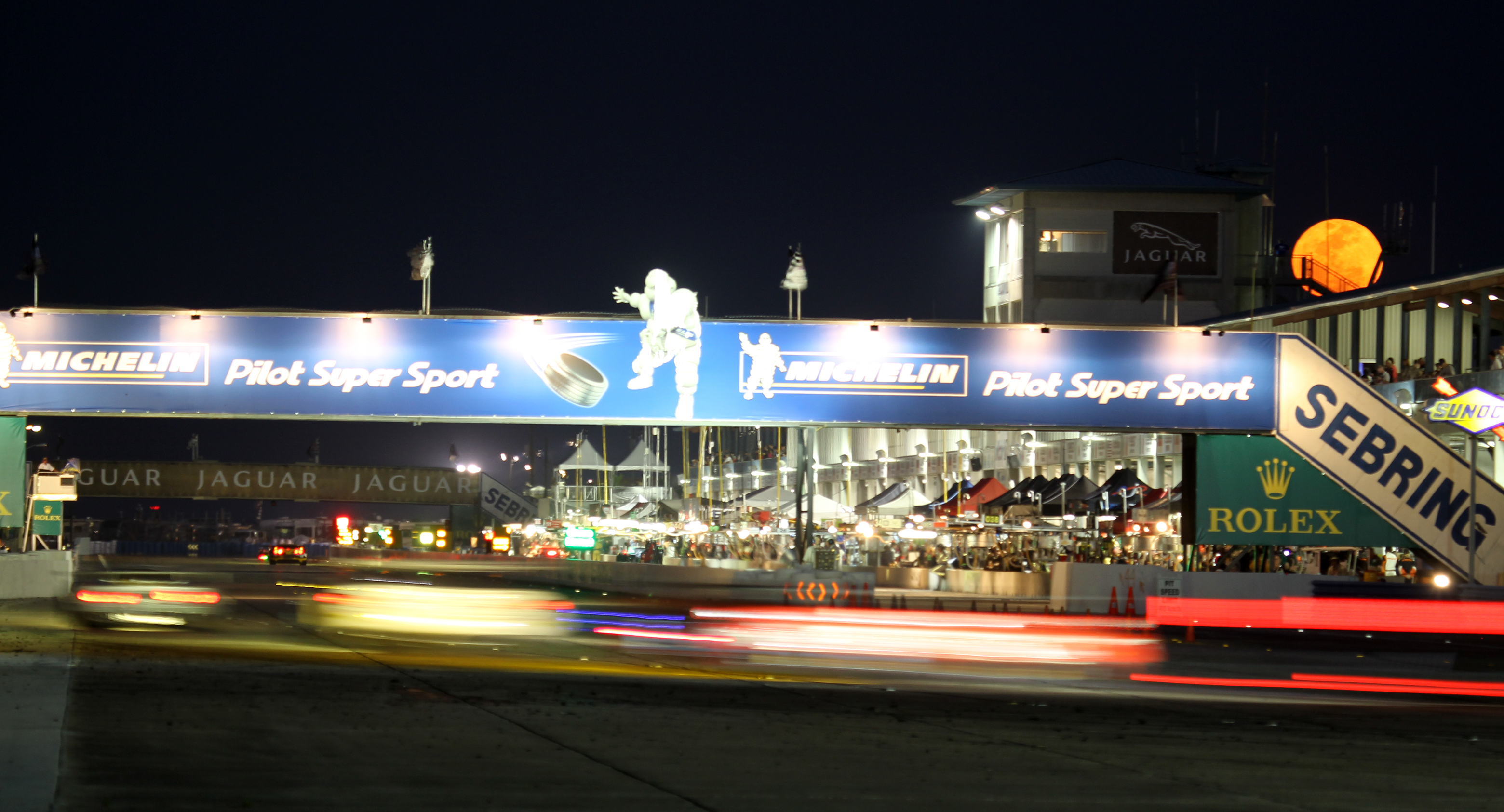
Final Hours of Sebring 2011

The track is currently owned by IMSA Holdings, LLC through its subsidiary Sebring International Raceway, LLC via its purchase of the Panoz Motor Sports Group in September 2012. It is currently leased by the Sebring International Raceway, LLC, which acquired the facility from Andy Evans in 1997.

The track is often recognized for "Turn 17", a long, high-speed right-hand corner with a surface that can significantly affect a car's exit speed onto the front straight. The corner is wide enough to accommodate up to three cars side by side.

Skip Barber Racing School held numerous programs at the facility, including a scholarship opportunity for young racers.

From 2019 to 2023 (with no races run in 2020 or 2021 due to the COVID-19 pandemic), the World Endurance Championship ran a round called the 1000 Miles of Sebring, run concurrently with the famed 12 Hours. The first race in 2019 was won by Toyota Gazoo Racing. When the event returned after the pandemic in 2022 it was won by the French Alpine Elf Team. Toyota then won their second race at Sebring in 2023. The FIA dropped the race from the WEC calendar in 2024 and 2025, its place being taken by the Lone Star Le Mans race at the Circuit of the Americas in Austin, Texas.

In 2021, the first-ever 24-hour race at Sebring took place, hosted by the World Racing League, an amateur endurance championship series, with W2W Racing winning the overall race.

== Track configuration ==
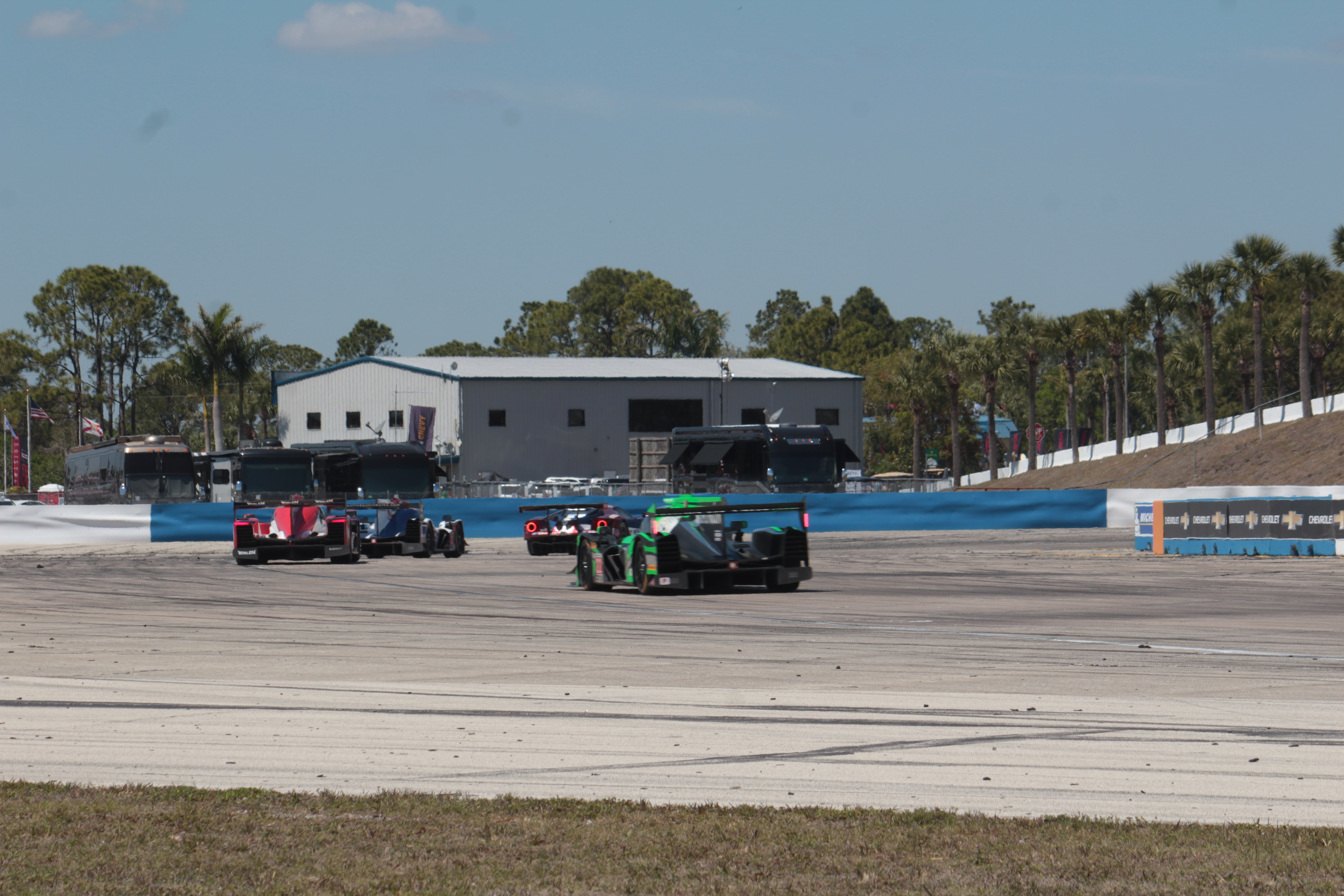
Sportscars at Sunset Bend at Sebring International Raceway during 2018 12 Hours of Sebring.

Sebring International Raceway consists of three tracks: the Full Circuit, the Short Circuit, and the Club Circuit. The course of the track itself is 3.741 mi (6.021 km) long. It is a seventeen-turn road course with long straights, several high-speed corners, and very technical slower corners. Many of the turns and points along the track are named for the early teams and drivers. Due to Florida's flat nature there is very little elevation change around the track and little camber on the surface, providing a challenging track for drivers, especially when it rains.

Sebring is renowned for its rough, bumpy and changing surfaces. The course still runs on old sections of World War II-era landing fields that were constructed of concrete sections with large seams. The transitions between sections are quite rough and often, sparks fly from the undercarriages of the cars as they traverse them. Much of the track has intentionally been left with its original concrete runway surface. The 12 Hours of Sebring is renowned as a race that is even harder on machinery and drivers than Le Mans, and is seen as an ideal preparation run for the famed French race.

The track surface has 3.04 mi (4.89 km) of asphalt and 0.7 mi (1.1 km) of concrete. Mario Andretti, a 3-time 12 Hours winner, said that one of the hardest parts about the original Sebring track was "finding the track to begin with." There had been many accounts of drivers retiring due to accidents at night, quite simply because they got lost on the runway sections and couldn't find the track again. Some drivers got lost even during the day, mostly because the track was poorly marked down with white lines and cones.

=== Layout history ===
Sebring International Raceway layout history
The track layout from 1952 to 1966 (1st variation)

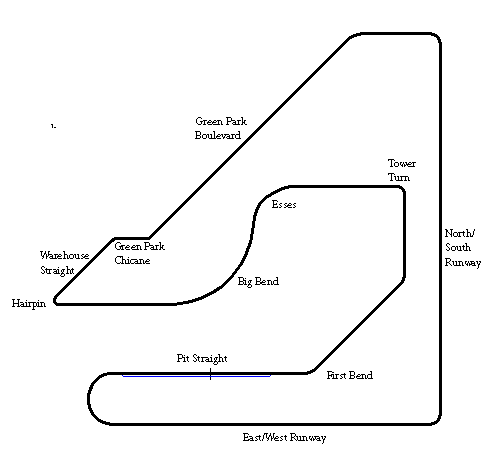
The track layout from 1967 to 1982 (2nd variation)

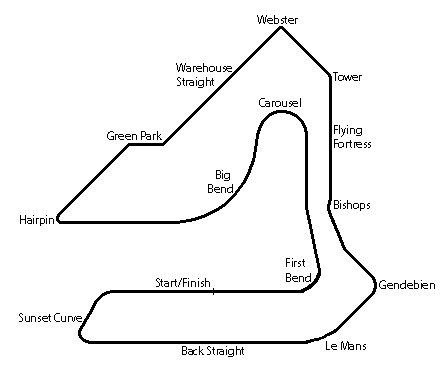
The track layout from 1987 to 1990 (5th variation)

The track layout from 1999 (8th variation)

== Events ==
Sebring is most notable for hosting the 12 Hours of Sebring, sanctioned by the FIA and IMSA, as part of many major endurance racing series, including the World Sportscar Championship, Intercontinental Le Mans Cup, ALMS, and now, the WeatherTech SportsCar Championship. This race is the second of four races in the Michelin Endurance Cup. It has also hosted the final round of the 24H Series in 2021.

The track also hosts the Legends of Motorsport and Historic Sportscar Racing series, and is the winter home of the Skip Barber Racing School. Many IndyCar, sports prototype, and Grand Touring teams use Sebring for winter testing due to the warm climate.

The track is used numerous times each year by the Sports Car Club of America (SCCA) and the National Auto Sport Association (NASA) for amateur events that draw participants from all over the country.

IndyCar regularly holds tests at the top half of the facility to simulate street circuits on its calendar.

=== Current events ===
- January: SCCA Super Tour Central Florida Majors
- February: Historic Sportscar Racing Sebring Pistons and Props
- March: IMSA WeatherTech SportsCar Championship 12 Hours of Sebring, Trans-Am Series Sebring SpeedTour, Sportscar Vintage Racing Association, Michelin Pilot Challenge, Porsche Carrera Cup North America, Lamborghini Super Trofeo North America, Mustang Challenge North America, Porsche Sprint Challenge North America, IMSA VP Racing SportsCar Challenge
- April: Ferrari Challenge North America
- May: GT World Challenge America, GT America Series, GT4 America Series, TC America Series
- June: ChampCar Endurance Series
- September: NASA Championships, ChampCar Endurance Series
- December: Historic Sportscar Racing Classic 12 Hours of Sebring

=== Former events ===
- 24H Series
  - 24 Hours of Sebring (2021)
- American Le Mans Series (1999–2013)
- Barber Pro Series (1992–2002)
- FIA GT Championship
  - Sebring 3 Hours (1997)
- FIA World Endurance Championship
  - 12 Hours of Sebring (2012)
  - 1000 Miles of Sebring (2019, 2022–2023)
- Florida Winter Series (2014)
- Formula 4 United States Championship (2019–2020)
- Formula One
  - United States Grand Prix (1959)
- Formula Regional Americas Championship (2019–2020)
- Global MX-5 Cup (2012–2014, 2021, 2024)
- IMSA GT Championship (1973, 1975–1998)
- IMSA WeatherTech SportsCar Championship
  - Grand Prix of Sebring (2020)
- Lamborghini Super Trofeo World Final (2015)
- LATAM Challenge Series (2014)
- SCCA Continental Championship (1969–1970)
- Sprint Race Brasil (2019)
- USF2000 Championship (1999, 2001–2004, 2011–2013, 2023)
- USF Juniors (2023)
- USF Pro 2000 Championship (1999, 2001–2010, 2023)
- World Sportscar Championship (1953–1972, 1981)

== Lap records ==
As of April 2026, the fastest official race lap records at the Sebring International Raceway for different classes are listed as:

Category	Time	Driver	Vehicle	Event
Current Grand Prix Road Course Layout (1999–present): 3.740 mi (6.019 km)
LMP1	1:41.800	Kamui Kobayashi	Toyota TS050 Hybrid	2019 1000 Miles of Sebring
DPi	1:46.151	Felipe Nasr (Note: Both drivers set the same lap time in this race independently.); Renger van der Zande	Cadillac DPi-V.R	2021 12 Hours of Sebring
LMP2	1:46.638	Romain Dumas	Porsche RS Spyder Evo	2007 12 Hours of Sebring
LMH	1:47.885	Sébastien Buemi	Toyota GR010 Hybrid	2023 1000 Miles of Sebring
LMDh	1:48.311	Renger van der Zande	Cadillac V-Series.R	2023 12 Hours of Sebring
LMP900	1:48.418	Tom Kristensen	Audi R8	2002 12 Hours of Sebring
LMP675	1:50.953	James Weaver	Lola EX257	2003 12 Hours of Sebring
LMP	1:51.608	Tomáš Enge	Riley & Scott Mk III	1999 12 Hours of Sebring
DP	1:52.134	Ryan Dalziel	HPD ARX-03b	2014 12 Hours of Sebring
LMPC	1:54.549	Pato O'Ward	Oreca FLM09	2017 12 Hours of Sebring
LM GTE	1:55.642	Antonio García	Chevrolet Corvette C8.R	2021 12 Hours of Sebring
Formula Atlantic	1:55.942	John Edwards	Swift 016.a	2009 Sebring Formula Atlantic round
LMP3	1:56.166	Colin Braun	Ligier JS P320	2021 12 Hours of Sebring
GT1 (GTS)	1:56.473	Tomáš Enge	Aston Martin DBR9	2006 12 Hours of Sebring
GT3	1:58.448	Aaron Telitz	McLaren 720S GT3 Evo	2025 Apex One Endurance - 10 Hours of Sebring
Trans-Am	1:58.645	Brent Crews	Chevrolet Camaro Trans-Am	2025 Sebring Trans-Am round
USF Pro 2000	1:59.0703	Jace Denmark	Tatuus IP-22	2023 Sebring USF Pro 2000 round
Lamborghini Super Trofeo	2:00.733	Danny Formal	Lamborghini Huracán Super Trofeo Evo2	2026 Sebring Lamborghini Super Trofeo North America round
Formula Regional	2:01.200	Jacob Abel	Ligier JS F3	2019 Sebring F3 Americas round
Ferrari Challenge	2:01.535	Johnny Kaminskey	Ferrari 296 Challenge	2026 Sebring Ferrari Challenge North America round
Porsche Carrera Cup	2:02.468	Tyler Maxson	Porsche 911 (992 II) Cup	2026 Sebring Porsche Carrera Cup North America round
US F2000	2:02.860	Neil Alberico	Van Diemen DP08	2013 Sebring USF2000 round
Formula Abarth	2:03.659	Antonio Fuoco	Tatuus FA010B	2014 Sebring Florida Winter Series round
GT	2:04.353	Jon Fogarty	Porsche 911 (996) GT3 RSR	2004 12 Hours of Sebring
GT2 (GTS)	2:05.527	Andy Pilgrim	Chevrolet Corvette C5-R	1999 12 Hours of Sebring
SRO GT2	2:05.803	Elias Sabo	Audi R8 LMS GT2	2021 Sebring GT America round
Barber Pro	2:06.677	Nilton Rossoni	Reynard 98E	2000 Sebring Barber Pro round
TA2	2.06.779	Connor Zilisch	Chevrolet Camaro Trans-Am	2024 Sebring Trans-Am round
GT4	2:09.486	Loni Unser	Porsche 718 Cayman GT4 RS Clubsport	2025 Sebring Porsche Sprint Challenge North America round
USF Juniors	2:10.884	Nicolas Giaffone	Tatuus JR-23	2023 Sebring USF Juniors round
TCR Touring Car	2:12.848	Tyler Gonzalez	CUPRA León VZ TCR	2026 Alan Jay Automotive Network 120
Formula 4	2:13.343	Hunter Yeany	Crawford F4-16	2020 Sebring F4 United States round
Mustang Challenge	2:13.624	Robert Noaker	Ford Mustang Dark Horse R	2025 Sebring Mustang Challenge round
Toyota GR Cup	2:25.055	Westin Workman	Toyota GR86	2025 Sebring Toyota GR Cup North America round
Mazda MX-5 Cup	2:25.432	Jeremy Fletcher	Mazda MX-5 (ND)	2024 Sebring Mazda MX-5 Cup round
School Circuit (1998–present): 2.000 mi (3.219 km)
USF Juniors	1:29.153	Jacob Douglas	Tatuus JR-23	2023 Sebring Yacademy Winter Series USF Juniors round
Formula 4	1:31.068	Michael Costello	Crawford F4-16	2023 Sebring Yacademy Winter Series F4 round
Johnson Club Circuit (1998–present): 1.700 mi (2.736 km)
USF Juniors	1:06.358	Jack Jeffers	Tatuus JR-23	2024 Sebring Yacademy Winter Series USF Juniors round
Grand Prix Road Course (1996–1998): 3.600 mi (5.794 km)
WSC	1:51.867	Andrea Montermini	Ferrari 333 SP	1997 12 Hours of Sebring
GT1 (Prototype)	1:57.453	David Brabham	Panoz Esperante GTR-1	1998 Sebring Classic
GT2	2:08.448	Philippe Gache	Chrysler Viper GTS-R	1997 FIA GT Sebring 3 Hours
IMSA GT3	2:12.242	Bill Auberlen	BMW M3 (E36)	1998 Sebring Classic
Grand Prix Road Course (1991–1995): 3.700 mi (5.954 km)
IMSA GTP	1:49.616	Geoff Brabham	Nissan NPT-91 A	1992 12 Hours of Sebring
IMSA GTP Lights	2:01.271	Ruggero Melgrati	Spice SE89P	1991 12 Hours of Sebring
WSC	2:03.423	Andy Evans	Spice WSC94	1994 12 Hours of Sebring
IMSA GTS	2:03.993	Irv Hoerr	Oldsmobile Cutlass	1992 12 Hours of Sebring
IMSA GTO	2:04.230	Price Cobb	Mazda RX-7	1991 12 Hours of Sebring
IMSA GTU	2:14.772	Jim Pace	Nissan 240SX	1994 12 Hours of Sebring
IMSA Supercar	2:20.725	Sean Roe	Greenwood Corvette	1995 12 Hours of Sebring
Grand Prix Road Course (1987–1990): 4.110 mi (6.614 km)
IMSA GTP	1:58.582	Geoff Brabham	Nissan GTP ZX-T	1990 12 Hours of Sebring
IMSA GTO	2:12.457	Pete Halsmer	Mazda RX-7	1990 12 Hours of Sebring
IMSA GTP Lights	2:12.499	Ruggero Melgrati	Spice SE89P	1990 12 Hours of Sebring
IMSA GTU	2:22.988	Stu Hayner	Dodge Daytona	1990 12 Hours of Sebring
Grand Prix Road Course (1984–1986): 4.860 mi (7.821 km)
IMSA GTP	2:13.857	Derek Bell	Porsche 962	1986 12 Hours of Sebring
IMSA GTO	2:30.536	Jack Baldwin	Chevrolet Camaro	1986 12 Hours of Sebring
IMSA GTP Lights	2:33.571	Kelly Marsh	Argo JM16	1986 12 Hours of Sebring
IMSA GTU	2:43.072	Tom Kendall	Mazda RX-7	1986 12 Hours of Sebring
Grand Prix Road Course (1983): 4.750 mi (7.644 km)
IMSA GTP	2:22.750	Bill Whittington	March 83G	1983 12 Hours of Sebring
IMSA GTO	2:35.130	Carl Schafer	Pontiac Firebird	1983 12 Hours of Sebring
IMSA GTU	2:48.400	Joe Varde	Mazda RX-7	1983 12 Hours of Sebring
Grand Prix Road Course (1967–1982): 5.200 mi (8.369 km)
IMSA GTP	2:28.630	John Paul Jr.	Porsche 935 JLP-3	1981 12 Hours of Sebring
Group 5	2:30.460	Jo Siffert	Porsche 917K	1971 12 Hours of Sebring
Group 4	2:43.860	Marc Surer	BMW M1	1981 12 Hours of Sebring
IMSA GTX	2:47.444	Peter Gregg	Porsche 934/5	1977 12 Hours of Sebring
IMSA GTO	2:49.200	Hans-Joachim Stuck	BMW 3.0 CSL	1975 12 Hours of Sebring
IMSA GTU	2:54.180	Lee Mueller	Mazda RX-7	1981 12 Hours of Sebring
American Challenge	3:06.336	Gene Felton	Buick Skylark	1978 12 Hours of Sebring
Grand Prix Road Course (1952–1966): 5.192 mi (8.356 km)
Group 4	2:54.800	Dan Gurney	Ford GT40 Mk.II	1966 12 Hours of Sebring
Group 6	2:59.300	Jim Hall	Chaparral 2A	1965 12 Hours of Sebring
F1	3:05.000	Maurice Trintignant	Cooper T51	1959 United States Grand Prix
Sports car racing	3:06.200	John Surtees	Ferrari 330 P	1964 12 Hours of Sebring
Group 2	3:30.8	Bob Tullius	Dodge Dart	1966 4 Hours of Sebring
Short Road Course (1969–1970): 2.200 mi (3.540 km)
Formula 5000	1:04.800	David Hobbs	Surtees TS5	1969 Sebring F5000 round

== Sebring in pop culture ==
Sebring Raceway is featured in the video games rFactor 2,Pitstop II, iRacing, The Crew, Forza Motorsport 2, Forza Motorsport 3, Forza Motorsport 4, Forza Motorsport 5, Forza Motorsport 6, Forza Motorsport 7, Forza Motorsport (2023), Le Mans Ultimate, Total Immersion Racing and Sports Car GT. There are also end-user created versions for rFactor, GTR2, GTR Evolution, GT Legends, Grand Prix Legends and NASCAR Racing 2003 Season. In board gaming, Sebring was also featured in the first expansion for the Formula D board game by Asmodee games.
