= 1992 12 Hours of Sebring =

Sports car endurance race

The Contac 12 Hours of Sebring International Grand Prix of Endurance Presented by Camel, was the third round of the 1992 IMSA GT Championship and was held at the Sebring International Raceway, on 21 March 1992. Victory overall went to the No. 99 All American Racers Eagle MkIII driven by Juan Manuel Fangio II and Andy Wallace.

== Race results ==
Class winners in bold.

Pos	Class	No	Team	Drivers	Chassis	Tyre	Laps
Pos	Class	No	Team	Drivers	Engine	Tyre	Laps
1	**GTP**	**99**	**(United States) All American Racers**	**(Argentina) Juan Manuel Fangio II (United Kingdom) Andy Wallace**	**Eagle MkIII**	G	**360**
1	**GTP**	**99**	**(United States) All American Racers**	**(Argentina) Juan Manuel Fangio II (United Kingdom) Andy Wallace**	**Toyota 2.1L I4 Twin-Turbo**	G	**360**
2 DNF	GTP	83	(United States) Nissan Performance Technology	(Australia) Geoff Brabham (Republic of Ireland) Derek Daly (Australia) Gary Brabham (Netherlands) Arie Luyendyk	Nissan NPT-91 A	G	355
2 DNF	GTP	83	(United States) Nissan Performance Technology	(Australia) Geoff Brabham (Republic of Ireland) Derek Daly (Australia) Gary Brabham (Netherlands) Arie Luyendyk	Nissan 3.0L V6 Twin-Turbo	G	355
3	GTP	30	(Germany) Joest Racing	(Argentina) Oscar Larrauri (Italy) Massimo Sigala (Italy) Giampiero Moretti	Porsche 962	G	345
3	GTP	30	(Germany) Joest Racing	(Argentina) Oscar Larrauri (Italy) Massimo Sigala (Italy) Giampiero Moretti	Porsche 3.2L Flat 6 Twin-Turbo	G	345
4	GTP	2	(United Kingdom) Bud Light/Jaguar Racing	(United States) Davy Jones (Australia) David Brabham	Jaguar XJR-12	G	338
4	GTP	2	(United Kingdom) Bud Light/Jaguar Racing	(United States) Davy Jones (Australia) David Brabham	Jaguar 6.5L V12 N/A	G	338
5	**Lights**	**36**	**(United States) Downing Atlanta**	**(United States) Howard Katz (United States) Tim McAdam (United States) Jim Downing**	**Kudzu DG-1**	G	**314**
5	**Lights**	**36**	**(United States) Downing Atlanta**	**(United States) Howard Katz (United States) Tim McAdam (United States) Jim Downing**	**Mazda 1.3L 2 Rotor**	G	**314**
6	Lights	45	(United States) Scandia Motorsports	(United States) Charles Morgan (United States) Tommy Riggins	Kudzu DG-1	G	308
6	Lights	45	(United States) Scandia Motorsports	(United States) Charles Morgan (United States) Tommy Riggins	Buick 3.4L V6 N/A	G	308
7	**GTS**	**51**	**(United States) Rocketsports Racing**	**(United States) George Robinson (United States) Darin Brassfield (United States) Irv Hoerr (United States) Paul Gentilozzi**	**Oldsmobile Cutlass**	BF	**302**
7	**GTS**	**51**	**(United States) Rocketsports Racing**	**(United States) George Robinson (United States) Darin Brassfield (United States) Irv Hoerr (United States) Paul Gentilozzi**	**Oldsmobile 6.1L V8 N/A**	BF	**302**
8	**GTU**	**96**	**(United States) Leitzinger Racing**	**(United States) John Paul Jr. (United States) David Loring**	**Nissan 240SX**	T	**301**
8	**GTU**	**96**	**(United States) Leitzinger Racing**	**(United States) John Paul Jr. (United States) David Loring**	**Nissan 3.0L V6 N/A**	T	**301**
9	GTU	95	(United States) Leitzinger Racing	(United States) Butch Leitzinger (United States) Chuck Kurtz (United States) Bob Leitzinger	Nissan 240SX	T	297
9	GTU	95	(United States) Leitzinger Racing	(United States) Butch Leitzinger (United States) Chuck Kurtz (United States) Bob Leitzinger	Nissan 3.0L V6 N/A	T	297
10	GTP	98	(United States) All American Racers	(United States) P. J. Jones (United States) Rocky Moran	Eagle MkIII	G	294
10	GTP	98	(United States) All American Racers	(United States) P. J. Jones (United States) Rocky Moran	Toyota 2.1L I4 Twin-Turbo	G	294
11	GTS	95	(United States) Cunningham Racing	(United States) John Morton (Canada) Jeremy Dale (New Zealand) Steve Millen	Nissan 300ZX Turbo	Y	285
11	GTS	95	(United States) Cunningham Racing	(United States) John Morton (Canada) Jeremy Dale (New Zealand) Steve Millen	Nissan 3.0L V6 N/A	Y	285
12	GTU	82	(United States) Wendy's Race Team	(United States) Dick Greer (United States) Al Bacon (United States) Peter Uria (United States) Mike Mees	Mazda RX-7	G	278
12	GTU	82	(United States) Wendy's Race Team	(United States) Dick Greer (United States) Al Bacon (United States) Peter Uria (United States) Mike Mees	Mazda 1.3L 2 Rotor	G	278
13	GTU	73	(United States) Jack Lewis Ent Ltd.	(United States) Jack Lewis (United States) Bill Ferran (United States) Joe Cogbill	Porsche 911 Carrera RSR	H	276
13	GTU	73	(United States) Jack Lewis Ent Ltd.	(United States) Jack Lewis (United States) Bill Ferran (United States) Joe Cogbill	Porsche 3.2L Flat 6 N/A	H	276
14	GTU	58	(United States) Pro-Technik Inc	(United States) Bill Sargis (United States) Sam Shalala (United States) Andre Toennis (United States) Dan Pastorini	Porsche 911	G	266
14	GTU	58	(United States) Pro-Technik Inc	(United States) Bill Sargis (United States) Sam Shalala (United States) Andre Toennis (United States) Dan Pastorini	Porsche 3.2L Flat 6 N/A	G	266
15	GTS		(United States) J&B Motorsports	(United States) Luis Sereix (United States) Daniel Urrutia (Argentina) Jorge Polanco (United States) John Josey	Chevrolet Camaro	G	259
15	GTS		(United States) J&B Motorsports	(United States) Luis Sereix (United States) Daniel Urrutia (Argentina) Jorge Polanco (United States) John Josey	Chevrolet 6.0L V8 N/A	G	259
16	GTS	35	(United States) Bill McDill	(United States) Richard McDill (United States) Bill McDill (United States) Tom Juckette	Chevrolet Camaro	Y	252
16	GTS	35	(United States) Bill McDill	(United States) Richard McDill (United States) Bill McDill (United States) Tom Juckette	Chevrolet 6.0L V8 N/A	Y	252
17 DNF	Lights	48	(United States) Comptech Racing	(Italy) Ruggero Melgrati (Greece) Costas Los (United States) Parker Johnstone	Spice SE90P	BF	250
17 DNF	Lights	48	(United States) Comptech Racing	(Italy) Ruggero Melgrati (Greece) Costas Los (United States) Parker Johnstone	Acura 3.0L V6 N/A	BF	250
18	GTU	0	(United States) Full Time Racing	(United States) John Fergus (United States) Don Walker (United States) Neil Hanneman	Dodge Daytona	Y	249
18	GTU	0	(United States) Full Time Racing	(United States) John Fergus (United States) Don Walker (United States) Neil Hanneman	Dodge 2.4L I4 N/A	Y	249
19 DNF	GTS	23	(United States) Gary Smith	(United States) Gary Smith (United States) Gene Whipp (United States) Albert Ruiz	Pontiac Grand Prix	G	248
19 DNF	GTS	23	(United States) Gary Smith	(United States) Gary Smith (United States) Gene Whipp (United States) Albert Ruiz	Pontiac 5.9L V8 N/A	G	248
20	Lights	6	(United States) MAB Racing	(United States) Mel Butt (United States) Tommy Johnson (United States) Ron Zitza (United States) Rob Robertson	Tiga GT287	G	245
20	Lights	6	(United States) MAB Racing	(United States) Mel Butt (United States) Tommy Johnson (United States) Ron Zitza (United States) Rob Robertson	Buick 3.0L V6 N/A	G	245
21 DNF	GTU	26	(United States) Job Racing	(United States) Joe Pezza (United States) Jack Refenning (United States) Butch Hamlet	Porsche 911	G	240
21 DNF	GTU	26	(United States) Job Racing	(United States) Joe Pezza (United States) Jack Refenning (United States) Butch Hamlet	Porsche 3.2L Flat 6 N/A	G	240
22	GTS	21	(United States) Jim Downing	(United States) Kent Painter (United States) Robert Borders (Canada) Ed de Long	Chevrolet Camaro	G	238
22	GTS	21	(United States) Jim Downing	(United States) Kent Painter (United States) Robert Borders (Canada) Ed de Long	Chevrolet 5.8L V8 N/A	G	238
23	GTS	29	(United States) Overbagh Racing	(United States) Oma Kimbrough (United States) Mark Montgomery (United States) Robert McElheny (United States) Hoyt Overbagh	Chevrolet Camaro	G	238
23	GTS	29	(United States) Overbagh Racing	(United States) Oma Kimbrough (United States) Mark Montgomery (United States) Robert McElheny (United States) Hoyt Overbagh	Chevrolet 5.8L V8 N/A	G	238
24 DNF	GTP	84	(United States) Nissan Performance Technology	(United States) Chip Robinson (United States) Bob Earl (Netherlands) Arie Luyendyk	Nissan NPT-91 A	G	227
24 DNF	GTP	84	(United States) Nissan Performance Technology	(United States) Chip Robinson (United States) Bob Earl (Netherlands) Arie Luyendyk	Nissan 3.0L V6 Twin-Turbo	G	227
25 DNF	GTP	7	(Germany) Joest Racing	(Germany) Bernd Schneider (Germany) Frank Jelinski (Germany) "John Winter"	Porsche 962	G	221
25 DNF	GTP	7	(Germany) Joest Racing	(Germany) Bernd Schneider (Germany) Frank Jelinski (Germany) "John Winter"	Porsche 3.2L Flat 6 Twin-Turbo	G	221
26 DNF	Lights	44	(United States) Scandia Motorsports	(Spain) Fermín Vélez (United States) Andy Evans (United States) Jay Cochran	Kudzu DG-2	G	221
26 DNF	Lights	44	(United States) Scandia Motorsports	(Spain) Fermín Vélez (United States) Andy Evans (United States) Jay Cochran	Buick 3.4L V6 N/A	G	221
27	GTS	12	(United States) John Annis	(United States) John Annis (United States) Louis Beall (United States) Dick Downs (United States) Larry Schumacher (United States) Bob Deeks	Chevrolet Lumina	G	208
27	GTS	12	(United States) John Annis	(United States) John Annis (United States) Louis Beall (United States) Dick Downs (United States) Larry Schumacher (United States) Bob Deeks	Chevrolet 5.5L V8 N/A	G	208
28	GTU	34	Albert Motorsports/Team Peru	(Peru) Juan Dibos (Peru) Eduardo Dibós Chappuis (Peru) Raul Orlandini	Mazda MX-6	G	199
28	GTU	34	Albert Motorsports/Team Peru	(Peru) Juan Dibos (Peru) Eduardo Dibós Chappuis (Peru) Raul Orlandini	Mazda 1.3L 2 Rotor	G	199
29 DNF	GTS	41	(United States) Rocketsports Racing	(United States) Irv Hoerr (United States) Jack Baldwin (United States) Paul Gentilozzi	Oldsmobile Cutlass	BF	185
29 DNF	GTS	41	(United States) Rocketsports Racing	(United States) Irv Hoerr (United States) Jack Baldwin (United States) Paul Gentilozzi	Oldsmobile 6.5L V8 N/A	BF	185
30 DNF	GTU	39	(Canada) Fiorano Motorsports	(Canada) Rudy Bartling (Canada) Ahmad Khodkar (Canada) Rainer Brezinka	Porsche 911	G	183
30 DNF	GTU	39	(Canada) Fiorano Motorsports	(Canada) Rudy Bartling (Canada) Ahmad Khodkar (Canada) Rainer Brezinka	Porsche 3.2L Flat 6 N/A	G	183
31	GTS	67	(United States) Mazkar Racing	(Argentina) Paul Mazzacane (United States) Chester Edwards (United States) Brad Shinder (United States) Peter Argetsinger	Chevrolet Camaro	G	154
31	GTS	67	(United States) Mazkar Racing	(Argentina) Paul Mazzacane (United States) Chester Edwards (United States) Brad Shinder (United States) Peter Argetsinger	Chevrolet 5.9L V8 N/A	G	154
32 DNF	GTU	57	(United States) Kryderacing	(United States) Joe Danaher (United States) Duke McLaughlin (United States) Frank del Vecchio	Nissan 240SX	G	139
32 DNF	GTU	57	(United States) Kryderacing	(United States) Joe Danaher (United States) Duke McLaughlin (United States) Frank del Vecchio	Nissan 3.0L V6 N/A	G	139
33 DNF	GTS	75	(United States) Cunningham Racing	(United States) Johnny O'Connell (United States) John Morton (New Zealand) Steve Millen	Nissan 300ZX Turbo	Y	117
33 DNF	GTS	75	(United States) Cunningham Racing	(United States) Johnny O'Connell (United States) John Morton (New Zealand) Steve Millen	Nissan 3.0L V6 Twin-Turbo	Y	117
34 DNF	GTP	4	(United States) Tom Milner Racing	(South Africa) Wayne Taylor (United States) Hugh Fuller (France) François Migault (Canada) David Tennyson	Spice SE89P	G	111
34 DNF	GTP	4	(United States) Tom Milner Racing	(South Africa) Wayne Taylor (United States) Hugh Fuller (France) François Migault (Canada) David Tennyson	Chevrolet 6.3L V8 N/A	G	111
35 DNF	GTS	25	(United States) Dale Kreider	(United States) Jon Gooding (United States) Dale Kreider (United States) Nort Northam	Oldsmobile Cutlass	G	104
35 DNF	GTS	25	(United States) Dale Kreider	(United States) Jon Gooding (United States) Dale Kreider (United States) Nort Northam	Oldsmobile 4.5L V6 N/A	G	104
36 DNF	GTS	54	(United States) Art Cross Racing	(United States) Art Cross (United States) Bobby Scolo	Chevrolet Camaro	G	72
36 DNF	GTS	54	(United States) Art Cross Racing	(United States) Art Cross (United States) Bobby Scolo	Chevrolet 5.8L V8 N/A	G	72
37 DNF	GTU	80	(United States) David S. Duda	(United States) Mike Speakman (United States) David Duda	Nissan 300ZX	G	68
37 DNF	GTU	80	(United States) David S. Duda	(United States) Mike Speakman (United States) David Duda	Nissan 3.0L V6 N/A	G	68
38 DNF	GTU	55	(United States) Brix Racing	(United States) Bob Schader (United States) Phil Mahre (United States) Steve Mahre	Mazda MX-6	G	60
38 DNF	GTU	55	(United States) Brix Racing	(United States) Bob Schader (United States) Phil Mahre (United States) Steve Mahre	Mazda 1.3L 2 Rotor	G	60
39 DNF	Lights	49	(United States) Comptech Racing	(United States) Parker Johnstone (United States) Dan Marvin	Spice SE91P	BF	55
39 DNF	Lights	49	(United States) Comptech Racing	(United States) Parker Johnstone (United States) Dan Marvin	Acura 3.0L V6 N/A	BF	55
40 DNF	GTS	65	(United States) Jill Prewitt	(United States) Gene Felton (United States) Jerry Nadeau	Chevrolet Beretta	G	48
40 DNF	GTS	65	(United States) Jill Prewitt	(United States) Gene Felton (United States) Jerry Nadeau	Chevrolet V8 N/A	G	48
41 DNF	GTP	59	(United States) Brumos Porsche	(United States) Hurley Haywood (United States) Bobby Carradine	Gunnar 966	G	45
41 DNF	GTP	59	(United States) Brumos Porsche	(United States) Hurley Haywood (United States) Bobby Carradine	Porsche 3.0L Flat 6 Turbo	G	45
42 DNF	GTS	8	(United States) General Kinetics	(United States) Don Arpin (Canada) Rob Vining (United States) Edd Davin	Chevrolet Camaro	G	42
42 DNF	GTS	8	(United States) General Kinetics	(United States) Don Arpin (Canada) Rob Vining (United States) Edd Davin	Chevrolet 5.8L V8 N/A	G	42
43 DNF	GTP	1	(United States) Nissan Performance Technology	(Australia) Geoff Brabham	Nissan NPT-91 A	G	20
43 DNF	GTP	1	(United States) Nissan Performance Technology	(Australia) Geoff Brabham	Nissan 3.0L V6 Twin-Turbo	G	20
44 DNF	GTU	9	(United States) Support Net Racing	(United States) Henry Camferdam (United States) Phil Krueger (United States) Gary Drummond	Mazda MX-6	G	11
44 DNF	GTU	9	(United States) Support Net Racing	(United States) Henry Camferdam (United States) Phil Krueger (United States) Gary Drummond	Mazda 1.3L 2 Rotor	G	11
45 DNF	GTS	15	(United States) Connie Banks	(United States) Jim Pace (United States) Barry Waddell (United States) Tim Banks	Chevrolet Lumina	G	9
45 DNF	GTS	15	(United States) Connie Banks	(United States) Jim Pace (United States) Barry Waddell (United States) Tim Banks	Chevrolet V8 N/A	G	9
46 DNF	GTU	37	(Colombia) Botero Racing Team	(New Zealand) Rob Wilson (Colombia) Lucio Bernal (Colombia) Felipe Solano (Cuba) Miguel Morejon	Mazda MX-6	Y	8
46 DNF	GTU	37	(Colombia) Botero Racing Team	(New Zealand) Rob Wilson (Colombia) Lucio Bernal (Colombia) Felipe Solano (Cuba) Miguel Morejon	Mazda 1.3L 2 Rotor	Y	8
47 DNF	GTP	5	(United States) Tom Milner Racing	(United Kingdom) Perry McCarthy (United States) Les Delano	Intrepid RM-1	G	7
47 DNF	GTP	5	(United States) Tom Milner Racing	(United Kingdom) Perry McCarthy (United States) Les Delano	Chevrolet 6.5L V8 N/A	G	7
48 DNF	Lights	40	(Canada) Bieri Racing	(Switzerland) Heinz Wirth (Canada) Uli Bieri (Canada) John Graham (United Kingdom) Andrew Hepworth (Canada) Vito Scavone	Alba AR20	G	3
48 DNF	Lights	40	(Canada) Bieri Racing	(Switzerland) Heinz Wirth (Canada) Uli Bieri (Canada) John Graham (United Kingdom) Andrew Hepworth (Canada) Vito Scavone	Ford 3.0L V6 N/A	G	3
DNS	GTP	77	(United States) Mazda Motorsports	(United Kingdom) James Weaver (United States) Price Cobb	Mazda RX-792P	G	0
DNS	GTP	77	(United States) Mazda Motorsports	(United Kingdom) James Weaver (United States) Price Cobb	Mazda 5.2L 4 Rotor	G	0

=== Class Winners ===
Class	Winners	
GTP	Fangio II / Wallace	Eagle MkIII
Lights	Katz / McAdam / Downing	Kudzu DG-1
GTS	Robinson / Brassfield / Hoerr / Gentilozzi	Oldsmobile Cutlass
GTU	Paul Jr. / Loring	Nissan 240SX
