= Louis Krages =

German racing driver (1949–2001)

Louis Krages "John Winter"
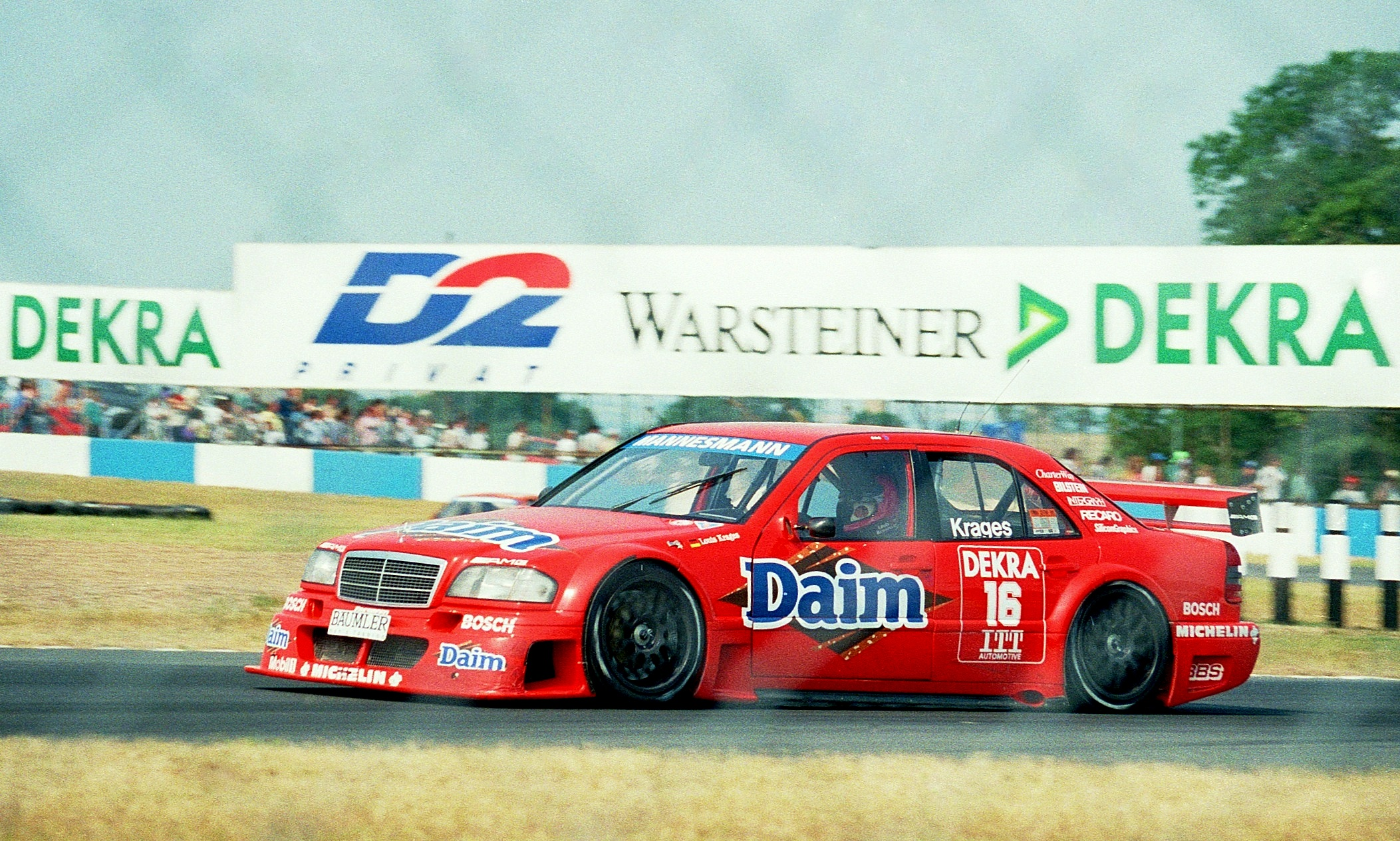
- Krages in 1995.
- Nationality: (Germany) German
- Born: Klaus Louis Kragés; 2 August 1949 Bremen, West Germany
- Died: 11 January 2001 (aged 51) Atlanta, Georgia, United States

24 Hours of Le Mans career
- Years: 1978 – 1979, 1984 – 1986, 1998 – 1991, 1993
- Teams: Porsche Kremer Racing; Joest Racing
- Best finish: 1st (1985)
- Class wins: 1 (1985)

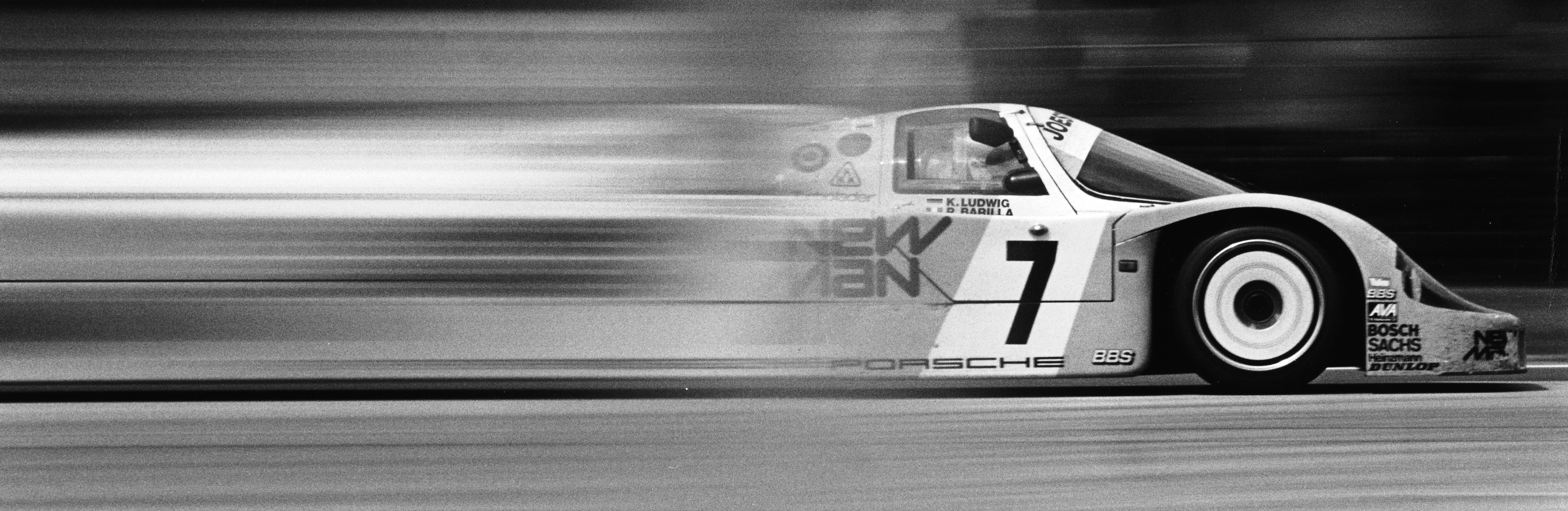
The '24h of Le Mans 1985' winning Joest-Porsche 956C of Ludwig, Barilla and "Winter"

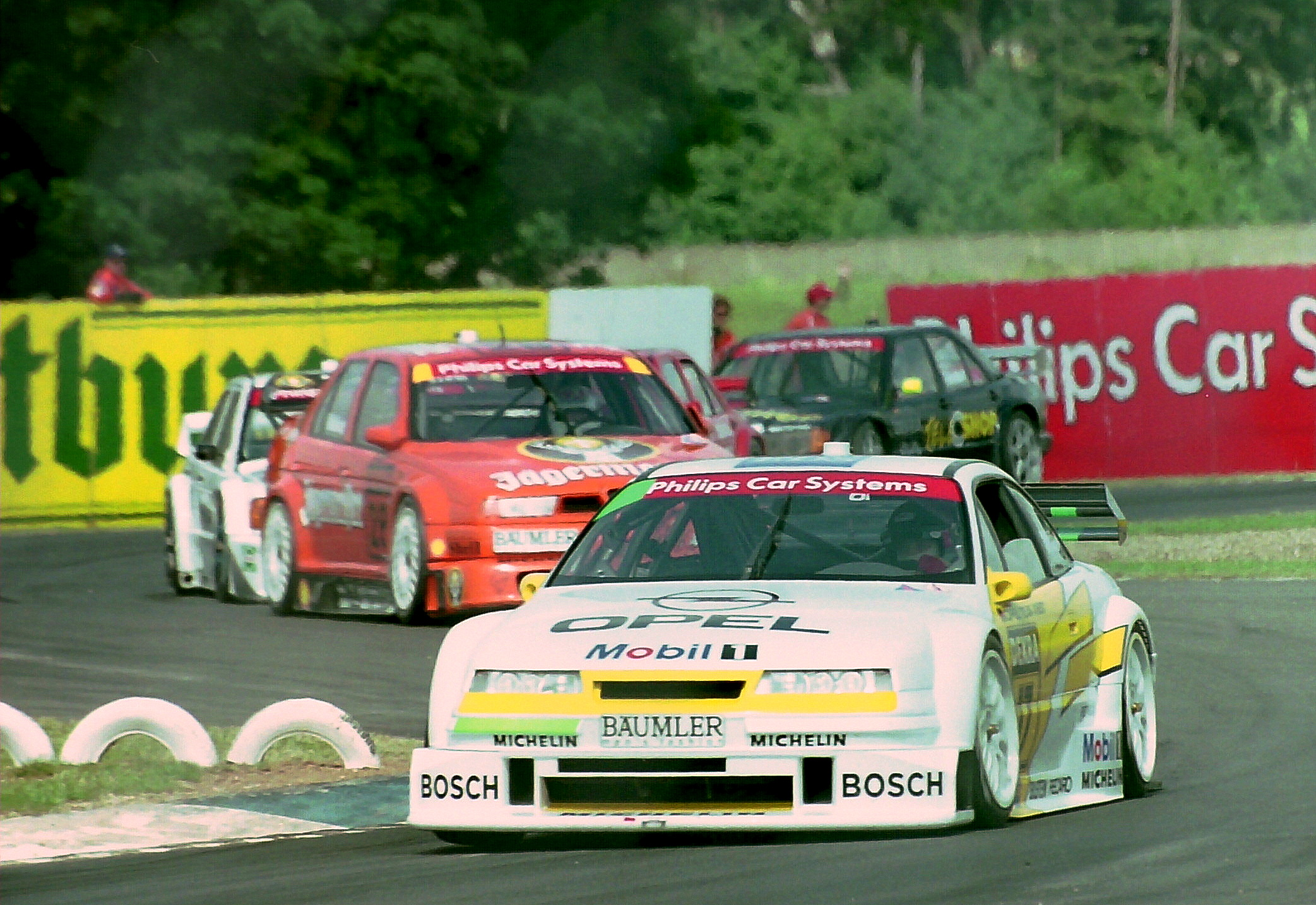
John Winter - Opel Team Joest - Opel Calibra V6 exits The Esses, 1994 DTM Donington Park.

Louis Krages (born Klaus Louis Kragés, 2 August 1949 – 11 January 2001), more commonly known by his pseudonym John Winter, was a German racing driver and businessman.

== Career ==
Krages used the racing pseudonym "John Winter" to prevent his family, mainly his mother, from learning about his hobby.

After debuting in a Porsche 911 during 1976, Krages competed in the Deutsche Automobil Rundstrecken Serie, where he scored several podiums. Krages joined the more prestigious DRM series in 1978; he also made his 24 Hours of Daytona and 24 Hours of Le Mans debuts the same year.

After several years with on-off racing commitments in the DRM and World Sportscar Championship, Krages drove alongside his friend and team owner Dieter Schornstein in a Group C Porsche 956 during a large part of the 1984 World Sportscar Championship season, including Le Mans.

The following year, still driving as John Winter, he won the 1985 24 Hours of Le Mans with the 956 of Joest Racing, partnering Klaus Ludwig and Paolo Barilla. Winter drove a single stint in the early hours of Sunday in support of his teammates for less than an hour, most of it behind the safety car.

After the success and the publicity involved, his alter ego was revealed to his family when, the next day, his mother picked up a newspaper, with a picture of Krages on the rostrum. Despite his fears that she might disapprove of such a dangerous pastime, Krages was instead encouraged to carry on racing. During 1985, Krages also won a race at the sparesely-attended AVUS round of the DRM.

Krages spent many seasons competing in the German Interserie series, usually racing privately entered Porsches, taking the title in 1986. That year, he also returned to defend his Le Mans victory alongside Ludwig and Barilla, though an engine issue caused their retirement. Krages ended up competing at Le Mans ten times. Apart from his victory, his best finish was third in a Joest Racing Porsche 962 in 1988. He also won the 24 Hours of Daytona in 1991 for Joest in the same car.

He won the Porsche Cup, an annual award presented by Porsche AG to recognize the world's most successful privateer racing driver competing with Porsche machinery in a customer racing team, in 1988 and 1991.

In addition, Krages also drove in the IMSA GTP until 1993, the year he won at Road America with Manuel Reuter, when the series ended, making the car obsolete.

In 1994, Krages, along with the team, defected to DTM, driving an Opel Calibra. In Round 10, Race 1 at AVUS, he was involved in fiery accident, in which his car disintegrated in a fireball. For the following year, driving a privateer Mercedes-Benz C-Class, he reverted to competing under his real name, in the season which turned out to be his last. He only scored points at the Norisring and finished 23rd overall.

Krages sold off his business and emigrated to Atlanta where he started up a toy business.

In 2001, suffering from problems in his business and from depression, Krages died by suicide in Atlanta, Georgia, shooting himself at his home.

== Racing record ==
=== Complete 24 Hours of Le Mans results ===
Year	Team	Co-Drivers	Car	Class	Laps	Pos.	Class Pos.
1978	(West Germany) Porsche Kremer Racing	(West Germany) Dieter Schornstein (France) Philippe Gurdjian	Porsche 935-77	Gr.5; SP	182	N/C*	
1979	(West Germany) Porsche Kremer Racing	(West Germany) Axel Plankenhorn (France) Philippe Gurdjian	Porsche 935-K3	Gr.5; SP	273	13th	5th
1984	(West Germany) New-Man Joest Racing (West Germany) Schornstein Racing Team	(West Germany) Volkert Merl (West Germany) Dieter Schornstein	Porsche 956	C1	340	5th	5th
1985	(Germany) New-Man Joest Racing	(Germany) Klaus Ludwig (Italy) Paolo Barilla	Porsche 956B	C1	374	**1st**	**1st**
1986	(Germany) Joest Racing	(Germany) Klaus Ludwig (Italy) Paolo Barilla	Porsche 956B	C1	196	DNF (Engine)	
1988	(Germany) Blaupunkt Joest Racing	(Germany) Frank Jelinski (Sweden) Stanley Dickens	Porsche 962C	C1	385	**3rd**	**3rd**
1989	(Germany) Joest Racing	(Germany) Frank Jelinski (France) Pierre-Henri Raphanel	Porsche 962C	C1	124	DNF (Water leak)	
1990	(Germany) Joest Porsche Racing	(Sweden) Stanley Dickens (France) Bob Wollek	Porsche 962C	C1	346	8th	8th
1991	(Austria) Konrad Motorsport (Germany) Joest Porsche Racing	(Germany) Bernd Schneider (France) Henri Pescarolo	Porsche 962C	C2	197	DNF (Overheating)	
1993	(Germany) Joest Porsche Racing	(Germany) Manuel Reuter (Germany) Frank Jelinski	Porsche 962C	C2	282	DNF (Engine)	

- Note *: Not Classified because did not cover sufficient distance (70% of their winner) at the 12, 18 or 24-hour intervals.

=== Complete 12 Hours of Sebring results ===
Year	Team	Co-Drivers	Car	Class	Laps	Pos.	Class Pos.
1986	(Germany) Joest Racing	(Italy) Giampiero Moretti (United States) Randy Lanier	Porsche 962	GTP	10	DNF (Engine)	
1987	(Germany) Joest Racing	(South Africa) Sarel van der Merwe (United States) Danny Ongais	Porsche 962	GTP	281	4th	4th
1988	(Germany) Joest Racing	(Germany) Frank Jelinski (Italy) Paolo Barilla	Porsche 962	GTP	309	**2nd**	**2nd**
1990	(Germany) Joest Racing	(France) Henri Pescarolo (France) Bob Wollek	Porsche 962	GTP	261	11th	6th
1991	(Germany) Joest Porsche Racing	(Germany) Frank Jelinski (France) Henri Pescarolo	Porsche 962C	GTP	295	4th	4th
1992	(Germany) Joest Racing	(Germany) Bernd Schneider (Germany) Frank Jelinski	Porsche 962	GTP	221	DNF (Engine)	
1993	(Germany) Joest Porsche Racing	(United States) Chip Robinson (Germany) Manuel Reuter	Porsche 962	GTP	180	DNF (Accident)	

=== Complete 24 Hours of Daytona results ===
Year	Team	Co-Drivers	Car	Class	Laps	Pos.	Class Pos.
1978	(Germany) Kremer Porsche Racing	(Germany) Josef Brambring (Germany) Dieter Schornstein	Porsche 935-K2	GTX	635	5th	**3rd**
1991	(Germany) Joest Racing	(Germany) Frank Jelinski (France) Henri Pescarolo (United States) Hurley Haywood (France) Bob Wollek	Porsche 962	GTP	719	**1st**	**1st**
1992	(Germany) Joest Racing	(Germany) Bernd Schneider (Italy) Massimo Sigala (Argentina) Oscar Larrauri	Porsche 962	GTP	327	DNF (Engine)	
1993	(Germany) Joest Porsche	(France) Bob Wollek (Germany) Manuel Reuter (Germany) Frank Jelinski	Porsche 962	GTP	190	DNF (Engine)	

=== Complete Deutsche Rennsport Meisterschaft results ===
(key) (Races in bold indicate pole position) (Races in italics indicate fastest lap)

Year	Team	Car	1	2	3	4	5	6	7	8	9	10	11	12	13	14	15	16	17	18	Pos.	Pts
1978	Porsche Kremer Racing	Porsche 935	ZOL1; 9	NÜR1; 9	NÜR2; Ret	AVU; Ret	MAI; Ret	ZAN; DNS	KAS; 8	HOC; Ret	ZOL2; 6	NOR; Ret	NÜR3; 7								25th	17
1979	Porsche Kremer Racing	Porsche 935 Porsche 935 K3	ZOL1	HOC1; 8	NÜR1	SAL; Ret	MAI	NOR; 6	ZAN; 6	DIE; Ret	ZOL2; 6	HOC2; DNS	NÜR2; 4								16th	31
1980	Porsche Kremer Racing	Porsche 935 K3	ZOL1	NÜR1	HOC1	NÜR2	MAI	SPA	NOR	SAL	DIE; Ret	ZOL2; DNS	HOC2	NÜR3	HOC3						NC	0
1981	Porsche Kremer Racing	Porsche 924 Carrera GTR Porsche 935 K3	ZOL1; 14	NÜR1; Ret	HOC1; 14	NÜR2; Ret	MAI; 11	WUN; 7	NOR; 16	NÜR3; 3	SAL; Ret	HOC2; 5	ZOL2; Ret	HOC3; Ret	NÜR3; 13						21st	24
1982	Porsche Kremer Racing	Porsche 935 K3	ZOL1	HOC1	NÜR1	MAI	SAL	WUN	NOR; 13	HOC2	HOC3	NÜR2									NC	0
1984	DS-Porsche Racing Team	Porsche 956	NOR; Ret	NÜR1; 10	DIE; 5	BRA; 9	IMO; 7	NÜR2; 5													11th	23
1985	New Man-Joest Racing	Porsche 956B	NÜR1; 1; 5	NÜR1; 2; 11	HOC; 1; 7	HOC; 2; 5	WUN; 1; 6	WUN; 2; 5	AVU; 1; 2	AVU; 2; 1	ZEL; 1; 9	ZEL; 2; 3	ERD; 1; 9	ERD; 2; 5	NOR; 7	NÜR2; 1; 18	NÜR2; 2; 4	SIE; 1 (6)	SIE; 2 (Ret)	NÜR3; 6	4th	61.5

=== Complete FIA World Sportscar Championship results ===
Season	Team	Class	Car	Engine	1	2	3	4	5	6	7	8	9	10	11	12	13	14	15	16	17	Pos.	Pts
1978	Kremer Racing		Porsche 935		DAY; 5	SEB	MUG; 7	TAL	DIJ; 6	SIL; 5	NÜR; Ret	LEM; Ret	MIS	DAY	WAT	VAL; 6	ROD						
1979	Kremer Racing	Gr.5 SP	Porsche 935	Porsche 930/79 3.0L F6	DAY	SEB	MUG	TAL	DIJ	RIV	SIL	NÜR	LEM; 9	PER	DAY	WAT	SPA	BRH; Ret	ROA	VAL	ELS		
1983	Joest Racing	Group C	Porsche 936C	Porsche Type-935 2.6 L Turbo Flat-6	MON	SIL; Ret	NÜR	LMS; Ret	SPA; 8	FUJ												23rd	13
1983	Sorga S.A.	Group C	Porsche 956	Porsche Type-935/76 2.6 L Turbo Flat-6							KYA; 4											23rd	13
1984	Schornstein Racing Team	Group C	Porsche 956B	Porsche Type-935/76 2.6 L Turbo Flat-6	MON	SIL; 9	LEM; 5	NÜR; 10	BRH; 9	MOS	SPA; 8	IMO; 7	FUJ	KYA; 4	SAN; 11							18th	29
1985	New Man-Joest Racing	C1	Porsche 956	Porsche Type-935/76 2.6 L Turbo Flat-6	MUG	MON	SIL	LEM; 1	HOC; Ret	MOS	SPA; 6	BRH	FUJ; WD	SEL; DNS								56th	6
1986	Joest Racing	C1	Porsche 956B	Porsche Type-935 2.6L Turbo Flat-6	MON; Ret	SIL	LEM; Ret	NOR; 8	BRH; 5	JER	NÜR; Ret	SPA; 8	FUJ; 5									21st	22
1987	Joest Racing	C1	Porsche 962C	Porsche Type-935 2.8L Turbo Flat-6	JAR	JER	MON; 4	SIL	LEM; DNA	NOR; 3	BRH	NÜR; 4	SPA; 6	FUJ; 5								24th	22
1988	Joest Racing	C1	Porsche 962C	Porsche Type-935 3.0L Turbo Flat-6	JER; 5	JAR; 8	MON; 4	SIL; 5	LEM; 3	BRN; 5	BRH; Ret	NÜR; 4	SPA; Ret	FUJ; 3	SAN; 4							7th	140
1990	Joest Racing	C	Porsche 962C	Porsche Type-935 3.0L Turbo Flat-6	SUZ; 16	MON; Ret	SIL; Ret	SPA; 16	DIJ; Ret	NÜR; 12	DON; 14	MOT; 12	MEX; 8									NC	0
1991	Konrad Motorsport Joest Racing	C2	Porsche 962C	Porsche Type-935/82 3.2 L Turbo Flat-6	SUZ	MON	SIL	LEM; Ret	NÜR	MAG												24th	12
1991	Team Salamin Primagaz Joest Racing	C2	Porsche 962C	Porsche Type-935/82 3.2 L Turbo Flat-6							MEX; 3	AUT										24th	12

=== Complete Interserie results ===
(key) (Races in bold indicate pole position) (Races in italics indicate fastest lap)

Year	Team	Car	1	2	3	4	5	6	7	8	9	10	Pos.	Pts
1983	Joest-Racing	Porsche 956	ZEL	MOS	SIE; 1	SIE; 2	HOC; 3						19th	12
1985	New Man - Joest Racing	Porsche 956	NÜR1; Ret	HOC1; 5	WUN; 6	AVU; 1	ZEL; 5	ERD; 7	NÜR2; Ret	MOS; 3	SIE; Ret	NÜR3; 6	10th	61.5
1986	Porsche-Kremer	Porsche 956	THR; 5	WUN; 1	ZEL1; 5	MOS; 1	SIE; 6	ZEL2; 3					1st	68
1987	Joest Racing	Porsche 962C	HOC; 3	AVU; C	ZEL1; 3	WUN; 3	MOS; 4	SIE; 2	ZEL2; 4				2nd	58
1988	Joest Racing	Porsche 962C	HUN; 1	HOC; 2	WUN; 3	ZEL1; 2	MOS; 2	ZEL2					2nd	73
1989	Joest Racing	Porsche 962C	HUN	ZEL1	**WUN**; 1	MOS; WD	SIE	ZEL2					6th	20
1991	Joest Porsche Racing	Porsche 962C	HOC; 2	NÜR; 3	ZEL1; 2	BRH; 2	MOS; 3	**SIE**; 1	ZEL2; 3				2nd	89
1992	Joest Racing	Porsche 962C	MUG	NÜR; 3	BRH	ZOL	MOS; 2	SIE; 3	ZEL	JAR; 2			3rd	55.5
1993	Joest Racing	Porsche 962C	JAR	MUG	MOS	SIE	DON	ZEL; 3					13th	11

=== Complete Deutsche Tourenwagen Meisterschaft results ===
(key) (Races in bold indicate pole position) (Races in italics indicate fastest lap)

Year	Team	Car	1	2	3	4	5	6	7	8	9	10	11	12	13	14	15	16	17	18	19	20	21	22	23	24	Pos.	Pts
1992	Zakspeed	Mercedes 190E 2.5 Evo2	ZOL; 1	ZOL; 2	NÜR; 1	NÜR; 2	WUN; 1	WUN; 2	AVU; 1	AVU; 2	HOC; 1	HOC; 2	NÜR; 1	NÜR; 2	NOR; 1	NOR; 2	BRN; 1	BRN; 2	DIE; 1; 17	DIE; 2; 17	ALE; 1; 14	ALE; 2; 15	NÜR; 1 Ret	NÜR; 2 DNS	HOC; 1; 17	HOC; 2 Ret	NC	0
1994	Opel Team Joest	Opel Calibra V6 4×4	ZOL; 1; 16	ZOL; 2 Ret	HOC; 1 Ret	HOC; 2 DNS	NÜR; 1; 14	NÜR; 2; 18	MUG; 1 Ret	MUG; 2; 7	NÜR; 1; 15	NÜR; 2; 10	NOR; 1; 9	NOR; 2; 10	DON; 1; 11	DON; 2; 7	DIE; 1; 14	DIE; 2 DNS	NÜR; 1; 15	NÜR; 2 Ret	AVU; 1 DNS	AVU; 2 DNS	ALE; 1; 13	ALE; 2; 6	HOC; 1; 17	HOC; 2; 10	16th	11
1995	Zakspeed Mercedes	Mercedes C-Class V6	HOC; 1 Ret	HOC; 2 DNS	AVU; 1; 16	AVU; 2; 16	NOR; 1; 17	NOR; 2; 8	DIE; 1 Ret	DIE; 2; 13	NÜR; 1; 16	NÜR; 2; 15	ALE; 1; 14	ALE; 2; 12	HOC; 1 Ret	HOC; 2; 18											23rd	3

Sporting positions
Preceded by Klaus Ludwig; Henri Pescarolo	Winner of the 24 Hours of Le Mans; 1985 with: Klaus Ludwig; Paolo Barilla	Succeeded by Derek Bell; Hans-Joachim Stuck; Al Holbert
