= 1983 12 Hours of Sebring =

Sports car endurance race

The 12 Hours of Sebring, The Coca-Cola Classic, was the third round of the 1983 IMSA GT Championship and was held at the Sebring International Raceway, on March 19, 1983. Victory overall went to the No. 9 Personalized Autohaus Porsche 934 driven by Wayne Baker, Jim Mullen, and Kees Nierop.

== Race results ==
Class winners in bold.

Pos	Class	No	Team	Drivers	Car	Laps
1	**GTO**	**9**	**(United States) Personalized Autohaus**	**(United States) Wayne Baker (United States) Jim Mullen (Canada) Kees Nierop**	**Porsche 934**	**231**
2	**GTP**	**5**	**(United States) Bob Akin Motor Racing**	**(United States) Bob Akin (United States) Dale Whittington (United States) John O'Steen**	**Porsche 935**	**231**
3	GTP	86	(United States) Bayside Disposal Racing	(United States) Hurley Haywood (United States) Al Holbert	Porsche 935	229
4	GTO	61	(United States) Vista Racing	(United States) Don Courtney (United States) Luis Sereix (United States) Brent O'Neill	Chevrolet Monza	227
5	GTP	22	(United Kingdom) Nimrod Racing	(United States) Reggie Smith (United States) Lyn St. James (United States) Drake Olson	Nimrod NRA/C2	224
6	**GTU**	**66**	**(United States) Mike Meyer Racing**	**(United States) Jack Dunham (United States) Jeff Kline (United States) Jon Compton**	**Mazda RX-7**	**224**
7	GTO	65	(Puerto Rico) Manuel Villa	(Puerto Rico) Luis Gordillo (Puerto Rico) Manuel Villa (Puerto Rico) Chiqui Soldevilla	Porsche 911 Carrera RSR	224
8	GTU	82	(United States) Trinity Racing	(United States) Joe Varde (United States) Jack Baldwin (United States) John Casey	Mazda RX-7	223
9	GTO	01	(United States) Marketing Corporation of America	(United States) John Morton (United States) Tom Klausler	Ford Mustang	222
10	GTO	35	(United States) Pegasus Racing	(United States) Al Leon (United States) Paul Gilgan (United States) Wayne Pickering	Porsche 911 Carrera RSR	222
11 DNF	GTP	10	(United States) Cooke Racing	(United States) Ralph Kent-Cooke (United States) Jim Adams (Mexico) Josele Garza	Lola T600	221
12	GTP	94	(United States) Henn's Swap Shop Racing	(United States) Don Whittington (United States) Bill Whittington	Porsche 935	218
13	GTP	3	(United Kingdom) Grid Motor Racing	(United States) Skeeter McKitterick (United States) Milt Minter	Grid S1	216
14	GTU	37	(United States) Burdsall/Welter	(United States) Peter Welter (United States) Tom Burdsall (United States) Nort Northam	Mazda RX-7	216
15	GTU	23	(United States) Roe/Selby	(United States) Tim Selby (United States) Earl Roe	Porsche 911 Carrera RSR	210
16	GTO	83	(Canada) R&H Racing	(Canada) Rainer Brezinka (Canada) Rudy Bartling (United States) Roger Schramm	Porsche 911 Carrera RSR	204
17	GTU	92	(United States) Kent Racing	(United States) Lee Mueller (United States) Terry Visger	Mazda RX-7	204
18	GTU	63	(United States) RGP 500 Racing	(United States) Jim Downing (United States) John Maffucci (United States) Chuck Ulinski	Mazda RX-7	204
19	GTU	11	(United States) Paul Goral	(United States) Paul Goral (United States) Larry Figaro (United States) Peter Uria	Porsche 911	202
20	GTO	69	(Puerto Rico) Hiram Cruz Racing	(Puerto Rico) Mandy Gonzalez (United States) Hiram Cruz	Porsche 934	201
21 DNF	GTO	7	(United States) Racing Beat	(United States) Pete Halsmer (United States) Rick Knoop	Mazda RX-7	199
22	GTU	90	(United States) 901 Shop	(United States) Mike Schaefer (United States) Doug Zitza (United States) Jack Refenning	Porsche 911 SC	198
23	GTO	06	(Dominican Republic) Juan Lopez	(Dominican Republic) Juan Lopez (Dominican Republic) Luis Mendez	Porsche 911 Carrera	192
24	GTO	89	Taca El Salvador	(El Salvador) "Jamsal" (El Salvador) Eduardo Barrientos (El Salvador) Eduardo Galdamez	Porsche 911 Carrera RSR	188
25	GTU	27	(United States) Scuderia Rosso	(United States) Jim Fowells (United States) Ray Mummery (United States) Steve Potter	Mazda RX-7	185
26	GTO	14	(United States) Oftedahl Racing	(United States) Carl Shafer (United States) Carlos Ramirez (United States) Mike Meldeau	Pontiac Firebird	185
27	GTU	68	(United States) Jack Rynerson	(United States) Jack Rynerson (United States) Van McDonald (United States) Chris Wilder	Porsche 911	183
28	GTO	57	(United States) Dave Heinz Racing	(United States) Dave Heinz (United States) Jerry Thompson (United States) Paul Gentilozzi	Chevrolet Camaro	181
29	GTO	03	(United States) Bob's Speed Products	(United States) Bob Lee (United States) Timothy S. Lee (United States) Gary Myers	Ford Maverick	180
30	GTU	91	(United States) Bryant & Graham Racing	(United States) Charles W. Bryant (United States) Alex Priest (United States) Mike Guido	BMW 2002	178
31 DNF	GTU	93	(United States) Foreign Exchange	(United States) John Higgins (United States) James King (United States) Chip Mead	Porsche 911	175
32	GTU	30	(United States) Case Racing	(United States) Ron Case (United States) Craig Case (United States) Dave Pannacione	Porsche 911	173
33 DNF	GTU	60	(United States) Team Morrison	(United States) Jim Cook (United States) Steve Dietrich (United States) Al Bacon	Mazda RX-7	168
34	GTU	51	(United States) Red Roof Inns	(United States) Doug Carmean (United States) Don Herman	Mazda RX-7	167
35	GTO	58	(United States) Brumos Racing	(United States) Deborah Gregg (United States) Kathy Rude (United States) Bonnie Henn	Porsche 924 Carrera GTR	165
36	GTO	96	(United States) Weld Fixturing	(United States) Phil Byrd (United States) Freddy Baker (United States) Robert Kirby	Porsche 911 Carrera RSR	162
37	GTU	42	(United States) Gary Wonzer	(United States) Gary Wonzer (United States) Bill Bean (United States) Buzz Cason	Porsche 911	162
38 DNF	GTU	95	(United States) Ned Skiff	(United States) Ned Skiff (United States) Jim Leo	Renault 12	159
39 DNF	GTO	19	(United States) Van Every Racing	(United States) Lance van Every (United States) Ash Tisdelle	Porsche 911 Carrera RSR	153
40 DNF	GTO	02	(United States) Marketing Corporation of America	(United States) Ronnie Bucknum (United Kingdom) John Bright	Ford Mustang	153
41	GTO	4	(United States) Stratagraph	(United States) Billy Hagan (United States) Gene Felton (United States) Sam Moses (United States) Lloyd Frink	Chevrolet Camaro	153
42	GTU	04	(United States) Di Lella Racing	(United States) Vince DiLella (United States) Manuel Cueto	Porsche 911	152
43	GTO	79	(United States) Whitehall/Promotion	(United States) Tom Winters (United States) Bob Bergstrom (United States) Peter Dawe	Porsche 924 Carrera GTR	148
44 DNF	GTP	24	(United States) Pegasus III Racing	(United States) M. L. Speer (United States) Ken Madren (United States) Ray Ratcliff	Porsche 935	145
45 DNF	GTO	49	(United States) OMR Engines	(United States) Hoyt Overbagh (United States) Peter Kirill (United States) Paul Romano	Chevrolet Monza	145
46 DNF	GTO	13	(United States) Oftedahl Racing	(United States) Paul Fassler (United States) Steve Pope (United States) Carl Shafer	Pontiac Firebird	142
47	GTO	18	(United States) Diehl Hi-Pro	(United States) Carmen Lista (United States) David Marks (United States) Roy Newsome (United States) Bobby Diehl	Chevrolet Camaro	140
48	GTU	76	(United States) Hi Fi Hospital	(United States) Timothy Lee (United States) Al White (United States) Irwin Ayes	Ford Capri	140
49	GTO	15	(United States) DL Performance Engineering	(United States) Doug Lutz (United States) Mike Brummer (United States) Larry Connor	Porsche 911 Carrera RSR	139
50 DNF	GTO	36	(United States) Herman + Miller P+A	(United States) Paul Miller (United States) Jim Busby (United States) Ron Grable	Porsche 924 Carrera GTR	132
51	GTU	87	(United States) Don Flores	(United States) Robert Gottfried (United States) Tom Turner (United States) Donald Flores	Porsche 911	131
52 DNF	GTP	16	(United States) Hinze Fencing	(United States) Marty Hinze (United States) Randy Lanier (United States) Terry Wolters	March 82G	128
53	GTO	33	(United States) Karl Keck	(United States) Karl Keck (United States) Bill McDill (United States) Robert Whitaker	Chevrolet Corvette	128
54 DNF	GTO	29	(United States) Overby's	(United States) Robert Overby (United States) Don Bell (United States) Chris Doyle	Chevrolet Camaro	127
55	GTU	75	(United States) Bryant & Graham Racing	(United States) Cameron Worth (United States) Alan Crouch (United States) Janis Taylor	Ford Pinto	127
56 DNF	GTP	09	(United States) Henn's Swap Shop Racing	(United Kingdom) Derek Bell (United States) Michael Andretti (United States) John Paul Jr.	Porsche 935	125
57 DNF	GTP	8	(United States) Shelton Ferrari	(United States) Steve Shelton (United States) Tom Shelton	Ferrari 512 BB	120
58 DNF	GTP	44	(United States) Group 44	(United States) Bob Tullius (Canada) Bill Adam	Jaguar XJR-5	95
59 DNF	GTO	34	(United States) Drolsom Racing	(United States) George Drolsom (United States) Steve Cohen (United States) William Gelles	Porsche 924 Carrera GTR	94
60 DNF	GTO	26	(United States) Centurion Leasing	(United States) Tom Nehl (United States) Nelson Silcox (United States) Patty Moise	Chevrolet Camaro	92
61 DNF	GTP	21	(United Kingdom) Nimrod Racing	(United States) Victor Gonzalez (United States) Drake Olson	Nimrod NRA/C2	86
62 DNF	GTP	05	(United States) T&R Racing	(United States) Tico Almeida (Venezuela) Ernesto Soto	Porsche 935	82
63 DNF	GTO	99	(Colombia) Londono Bridge Racing	(Colombia) Gustavo Londono (United States) Carlos Munoz (United States) Hugo Gralia	Porsche 911 Carrera RSR	81
64 DNF	GTO	20	(United States) Paul Canary Racing	(United States) Paul Canary (United States) Jim Sanborn	Pontiac Firebird	78
65	GTU	52	(United States) TFC Racing	(United States) Dick Gauthier (United States) Tom Cripe (United States) Ron Collins (United States) Bill McVey	Porsche 911	67
66 DNF	GTP	77	(United States) Z&W Enterprises	(United States) Pierre Honegger (United States) Walt Bohren	Mazda GTP	61
67 DNF	GTO	64	(United States) Marcus Opie	(United States) Marcus Opie (United States) Tim Morgan (United States) Grant Bradley	Chevrolet Corvette	59
68 DNF	GTU	78	(United States) Der Klaus Haus	(United States) Klaus Bitterauf (United States) Vicki Smith (United States) Scott Flanders	Porsche 911	59
69 DNF	GTO	28	(El Salvador) Air Florida	(El Salvador) "Fomfor" (El Salvador) Arnoldo Kreysa (United States) Albert Naon	BMW M1	58
70 DNF	GTU	38	(United States) Mandeville Auto/Tech	(United States) Roger Mandeville (United States) Amos Johnson (United States) Danny Smith	Mazda RX-7	56
71 DNF	GTO	54	(United States) Daniel Vilarchao	(United States) Reynaldo Fernandez (United States) Daniel Vilarchao	Chevrolet Camaro	56
72 DNF	GTO	6	(United States) Shafer Motor Racing	(United States) Craig Shafer (United States) George Shafer (United States) Joe Maloy	Chevrolet Camaro	55
73 DNF	GTP	74	(United States) Mark Wagoner	(United States) Del Russo Taylor (United States) Larry Figaro	Chevron GTP	53
74 DNF	GTP	12	(United States) The Cummings Marque	(United States) Don Cummings (United States) Craig Rubright (United States) Charles Gano	Chevrolet Monza	50
75 DNF	GTP	25	(United States) Red Lobster Racing	(United States) Dave Cowart (United States) Kenper Miller (Colombia) Mauricio de Narváez	March 82G	46
76 DNF	GTU	31	(United States) Pegasus Racing	(United States) Jack Griffin (United States) John Zouzelka	Porsche 914	38
77 DNF	GTO	50	(United States) Latino Racing	(Costa Rica) Kikos Fonseca (Puerto Rico) Tato Ferrer (Puerto Rico) Diego Febles	Porsche 911 Carrera RSR	36
78 DNF	GTU	08	(United States) Diehl Hi Pro Enterprises	(United States) Bobby Diehl (United States) Roy Newsome	Mazda RX-7	29
79 DNF	GTP	39	(United States) Holly Racing	(United States) John Gunn (Colombia) Ricardo Londono	Phoenix JG1	26
80 DNF	GTO	40	(Canada) Bieri Racing	(Canada) Uli Bieri (Canada) Matt Gysler (Canada) Duff Hubbard	BMW M1	21
81 DNF	GTO	07	(Colombia) Londono Bridge Racing	(United States) Fred Flaquer (Colombia) Gustavo Londono (Colombia) Ricardo Londono (United States) Rene Rodriguez	Porsche 911 Carrera RSR	21
82 DNF	GTP	17	(United States) Dingman Bros. Racing	(United States) Billy Dingman (United States) Roger Bighouse	Chevrolet Corvette	11
83 DNF	GTP	47	(United States) Pepe Romero	(United States) Bill Whittington (United States) Pepe Romero (United States) Doc Bundy	March 83G	8
84 DNF	GTO	62	(United States) Bill Nelson	(United States) Bill Nelson (United States) Dale Kreider (United States) Lojza Vosta	Pontiac Firebird	1
DNS	GTP	2	(United States) Hinze Fencing	(United States) Marty Hinze (United States) Randy Lanier (United States) Terry Wolters	Porsche 935	0
DNS	GTO	53	(United States) Superior Racing Team	(United States) Raul Garcia (United States) Eugenio Matienzo	Chevrolet Camaro	0
DNS	GTU	80	(United States) Hallet Motor Racing Circuit	(United States) Anatoly Arutnoff (United States) Jose Marina	Lancia Stratos HF	0

=== Class Winners ===
Class	Winners	
GTP	Akin / Whittington / O'Steen	Porsche 935 K3
GTO	Baker / Mullen / Nierop	Porsche 934
GTU	Dunham / Kline / Compton	Mazda RX-7
