= 1990 12 Hours of Sebring =

Sports car endurance race

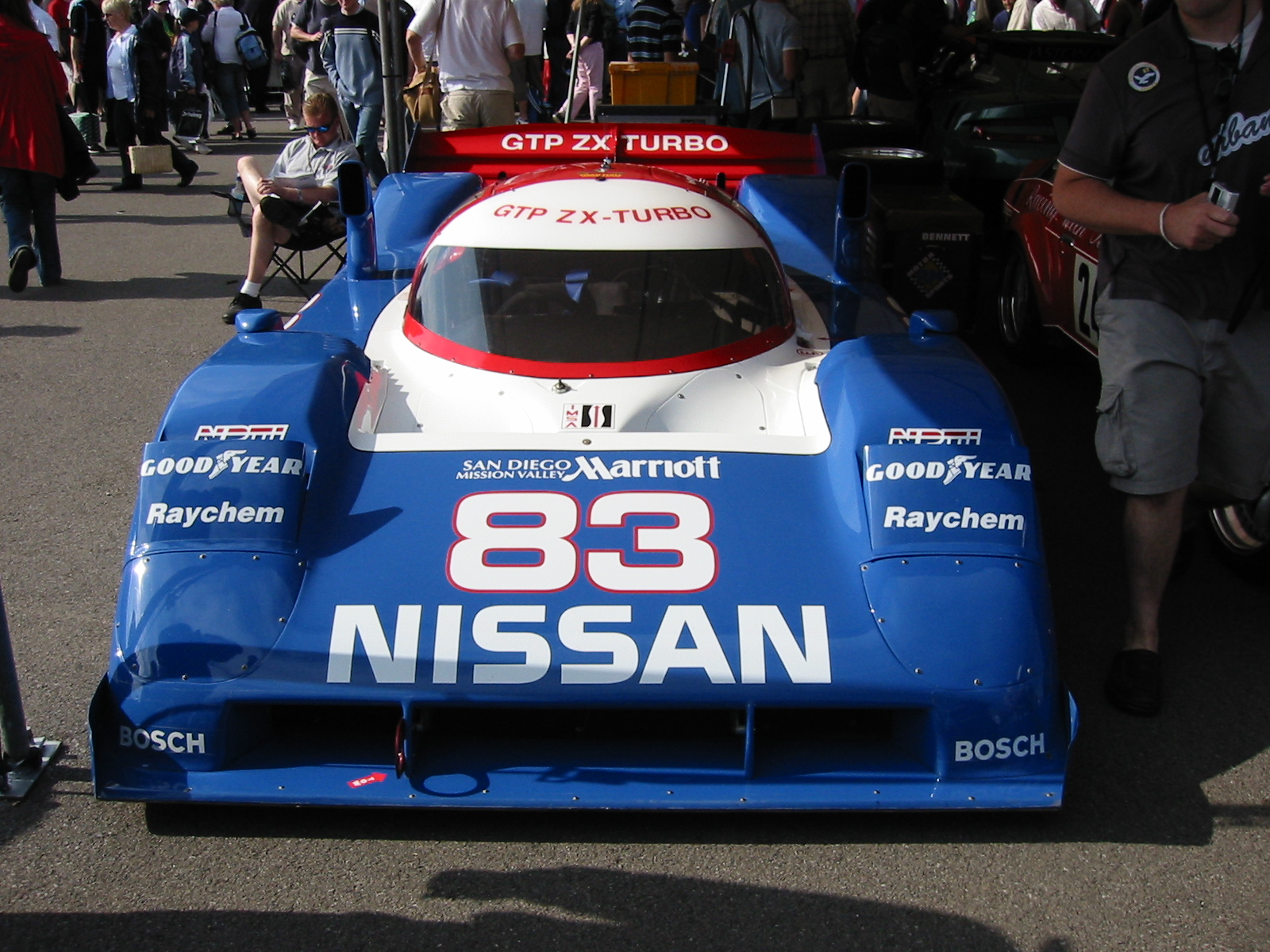
The race winning Nissan NPT-90 of /Daly

The Nissan Present the 38th Annual 12 Hours of Sebring International Grand Prix of Endurance, was the third round of both the 1990 IMSA GT Championship season and was held at the Sebring International Raceway, on 17 March 1990.

== Results ==
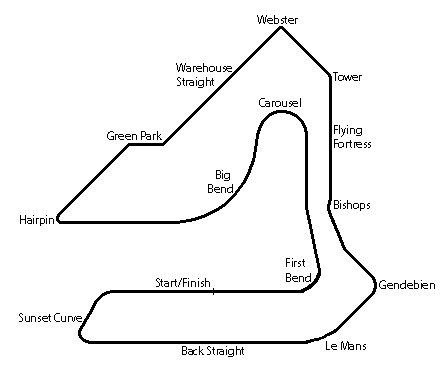
Sebring in 1990

Class Winners are in Bold text.

Pos	Class	No	Team	Drivers	Chassis	Tyre	Laps
Pos	Class	No	Team	Drivers	Engine	Tyre	Laps
1	**GTP**	**83**	**(United States) Nissan Performance Technology**	**(Republic of Ireland) Derek Daly (United States) Bob Earl**	**Nissan GTP ZX-Turbo**	**G**	**301**
1	**GTP**	**83**	**(United States) Nissan Performance Technology**	**(Republic of Ireland) Derek Daly (United States) Bob Earl**	**Nissan 3.0L V6 Turbo**	**G**	**301**
2	GTP	84	(United States) Nissan Performance Technology	(Republic of Ireland) Derek Daly (United States) Chip Robinson (Australia) Geoff Brabham	Nissan GTP ZX-Turbo	**G**	301
2	GTP	84	(United States) Nissan Performance Technology	(Republic of Ireland) Derek Daly (United States) Chip Robinson (Australia) Geoff Brabham	Nissan 3.0L V6 Turbo	**G**	301
3	GTP	61	(United Kingdom) Castrol Jaguar Racing	(United States) Davy Jones (Netherlands) Jan Lammers (United Kingdom) Andy Wallace	Jaguar XJR-12	**G**	301
3	GTP	61	(United Kingdom) Castrol Jaguar Racing	(United States) Davy Jones (Netherlands) Jan Lammers (United Kingdom) Andy Wallace	Jaguar 6.0L V12 N/A	**G**	301
4	GTP	10	(United States) Hotchkis Racing	(United States) John Hotchkis (United States) Adams (United States) John Hotchkis Jr.	Porsche 962	**G**	292
4	GTP	10	(United States) Hotchkis Racing	(United States) John Hotchkis (United States) Adams (United States) John Hotchkis Jr.	Porsche 3.0L Flat 6 Turbo	**G**	292
5	GTP	67	(United States) Busby Racing	(United States) Kevin Cogan (United States) John Paul Jr.	Nissan GTP ZX-Turbo	**BF**	286
5	GTP	67	(United States) Busby Racing	(United States) Kevin Cogan (United States) John Paul Jr.	Nissan 3.0L V6 Turbo	**BF**	286
6	**GTO**	**15**	**(United States) Roush Racing**	**(United States) Robby Gordon (United Kingdom) Calvin Fish (United States) Lyn St. James**	**Mercury Cougar XR-7**	**G**	**278**
6	**GTO**	**15**	**(United States) Roush Racing**	**(United States) Robby Gordon (United Kingdom) Calvin Fish (United States) Lyn St. James**	**Ford 6.0L V8 N/A**	**G**	**278**
7	**Lights**	**8**	**(United States) Essex Racing**	**(United States) Tom Hessert (United States) Charles Morgan**	**Spice SE88P**	**G**	**273**
7	**Lights**	**8**	**(United States) Essex Racing**	**(United States) Tom Hessert (United States) Charles Morgan**	**Buick 3.0L V6 N/A**	**G**	**273**
8	GTO	11	(United States) Roush Racing	(United States) Dorsey Schroeder (United States) Max Jones	Mercury Cougar XR-7	**G**	270
8	GTO	11	(United States) Roush Racing	(United States) Dorsey Schroeder (United States) Max Jones	Ford 6.0L V8 N/A	**G**	270
9	Lights	55	(United States) Huffaker Racing	(United States) Bob Lesnett (United States) David Rocha (United States) Bruce Qvale	Spice SE86CL	**F**	266
9	Lights	55	(United States) Huffaker Racing	(United States) Bob Lesnett (United States) David Rocha (United States) Bruce Qvale	Pontiac 3.0L I4 N/A	**F**	266
10	**GTU**	**95**	**(United States) Leitzinger Racing**	**(United States) David Loring (United States) Butch Leitzinger (United States) Chuck Kurtz**	**Nissan 240SX**	**T**	**262**
10	**GTU**	**95**	**(United States) Leitzinger Racing**	**(United States) David Loring (United States) Butch Leitzinger (United States) Chuck Kurtz**	**Nissan 2.9L V6 N/A**	**T**	**262**
11	GTP	0	(Germany) Joest Racing	(Germany) "John Winter" (France) Henri Pescarolo (France) Bob Wollek	Porsche 962	**G**	261
11	GTP	0	(Germany) Joest Racing	(Germany) "John Winter" (France) Henri Pescarolo (France) Bob Wollek	Porsche 3.0L Flat 6 Twin-Turbo	**G**	261
12	Lights	80	(Canada) Bieri Racing	(Italy) Martino Finotto (Italy) Ruggero Melgrati (Italy) Paolo Guatamacchi	Spice SE89P	**G**	261
12	Lights	80	(Canada) Bieri Racing	(Italy) Martino Finotto (Italy) Ruggero Melgrati (Italy) Paolo Guatamacchi	Ferrari 3.0L V8 N/A	**G**	261
13	GTU	37	(United States) Roger Mandeville	(United States) Al Bacon (United States) Lance Stewart (United States) John Finger	Mazda MX-6	**Y**	248
13	GTU	37	(United States) Roger Mandeville	(United States) Al Bacon (United States) Lance Stewart (United States) John Finger	Mazda 1.3L Rotary	**Y**	248
14 DNF	GTP	17	(Germany) Dauer Racing	(Brazil) Raul Boesel (Germany) Hans-Joachim Stuck	Porsche 962	**BF**	246
14 DNF	GTP	17	(Germany) Dauer Racing	(Brazil) Raul Boesel (Germany) Hans-Joachim Stuck	Porsche 3.0L Flat 6 Twin-Turbo	**BF**	246
15	GTU	82	(United States) Dick Greer Racing	(United States) Dick Greer (United States) Mike Mees (United States) John Hogdal	Mazda RX-7	**Y**	240
15	GTU	82	(United States) Dick Greer Racing	(United States) Dick Greer (United States) Mike Mees (United States) John Hogdal	Mazda 1.3L Rotary	**Y**	240
16	Lights	32	(United States) Spice Engineering USA	(Mexico) Tomas Lopez (Spain) Fermín Vélez (United Kingdom) Richard Piper	Spice SE90P	**G**	239
16	Lights	32	(United States) Spice Engineering USA	(Mexico) Tomas Lopez (Spain) Fermín Vélez (United Kingdom) Richard Piper	Buick 3.0L V6 N/A	**G**	239
17	GTU	71	(United States) Peter Uria Racing	(United States) Peter Uria (United States) Jim Pace (United States) Bob Dotson	Mazda RX-7	**G**	232
17	GTU	71	(United States) Peter Uria Racing	(United States) Peter Uria (United States) Jim Pace (United States) Bob Dotson	Mazda 1.3L Rotary	**G**	232
18 DNF	GTP	33	(United States) Spice Engineering USA	(Mexico) Bernard Jourdain (United States) Tommy Kendall (United States) Albert Naon Jr.	Spice SE90P	**G**	222
18 DNF	GTP	33	(United States) Spice Engineering USA	(Mexico) Bernard Jourdain (United States) Tommy Kendall (United States) Albert Naon Jr.	Chevrolet 6.0L V8 N/A	**G**	222
19	Lights	25	(United States) Performance Tech	(United States) Brent O'Neill (France) Jean de la Moussaye (United States) Pepe Romero	Argo JM19	**G**	221
19	Lights	25	(United States) Performance Tech	(United States) Brent O'Neill (France) Jean de la Moussaye (United States) Pepe Romero	Buick 3.0L V6 N/A	**G**	221
20	GTU	00	(United States) Full Time Racing	(United States) Kal Showket (United States) Don Knowles (United States) Neil Hanneman	Dodge Daytona	**Y**	220
20	GTU	00	(United States) Full Time Racing	(United States) Kal Showket (United States) Don Knowles (United States) Neil Hanneman	Dodge 2.4L I4 N/A	**Y**	220
21 DNF	GTU	57	(United States) Kryderacing	(United States) Reed Kryder (United States) Alistair Oag (United States) Frank del Vecchio	Nissan 300ZX	**G**	215
21 DNF	GTU	57	(United States) Kryderacing	(United States) Reed Kryder (United States) Alistair Oag (United States) Frank del Vecchio	Nissan 3.0L V6 N/A	**G**	215
22	GTU	38	(United States) Roger Mandeville	(United States) Kelly Marsh (United States) Al Bacon	Mazda MX-6	**Y**	210
22	GTU	38	(United States) Roger Mandeville	(United States) Kelly Marsh (United States) Al Bacon	Mazda 1.3L Rotary	**Y**	210
23 DNF	GTO	1	(United States) Downing/Atlanta	(United States) Pete Halsmer (United States) Elliott Forbes-Robinson (United States) John Morton	Mazda RX-7	**G**	209
23 DNF	GTO	1	(United States) Downing/Atlanta	(United States) Pete Halsmer (United States) Elliott Forbes-Robinson (United States) John Morton	Mazda 2.6L 4 Rotor	**G**	209
24	GTO	22	(United States) Gary Smith	(United States) Gary Burnett (United States) Gary Smith (United States) Albert Ruiz	Chevrolet Camaro	**G**	202
24	GTO	22	(United States) Gary Smith	(United States) Gary Burnett (United States) Gary Smith (United States) Albert Ruiz	Chevrolet 6.0L V8 N/A	**G**	202
25 DNF	GTP	98	(United States) All American Racers	(United States) Drake Olson (Argentina) Juan Manuel Fangio II	Eagle HF89	**G**	199
25 DNF	GTP	98	(United States) All American Racers	(United States) Drake Olson (Argentina) Juan Manuel Fangio II	Toyota 2.1L I4 Turbo	**G**	199
26 DNF	Lights	40	(Canada) Bieri Racing	(Canada) Uli Bieri (Canada) John Graham (Canada) David Tennyson	Tiga GT286	**G**	195
26 DNF	Lights	40	(Canada) Bieri Racing	(Canada) Uli Bieri (Canada) John Graham (Canada) David Tennyson	Ferrari 3.0L V8 N/A	**G**	195
27	GTO	87	(United States) Anthony Puleo	(United States) Anthony Puleo (United States) Kent Painter (United States) Ray Irwin	Chevrolet Camaro	**F**	195
27	GTO	87	(United States) Anthony Puleo	(United States) Anthony Puleo (United States) Kent Painter (United States) Ray Irwin	Chevrolet 5.7L V8 N/A	**F**	195
28 DNF	GTP	99	(United States) All American Racers	(United States) Rocky Moran (United States) Willy T. Ribbs	Eagle HF89	**G**	185
28 DNF	GTP	99	(United States) All American Racers	(United States) Rocky Moran (United States) Willy T. Ribbs	Toyota 2.1L I4 Turbo	**G**	185
29	GTU	09	(United States) Huffaker Racing	(Puerto Rico) Julian Gutierriz (Puerto Rico) Juan Vento (Puerto Rico) Luis Gordillo	Pontiac Fiero	**G**	170
29	GTU	09	(United States) Huffaker Racing	(Puerto Rico) Julian Gutierriz (Puerto Rico) Juan Vento (Puerto Rico) Luis Gordillo	Pontiac 3.0L I4 N/A	**G**	170
30	GTU	70	(Australia) Rising Sun Racing	(United States) Dave Russell (United States) Mick Robinson (United States) Bill Weston (United States) John Hofstra	Mazda RX-7	**F**	154
30	GTU	70	(Australia) Rising Sun Racing	(United States) Dave Russell (United States) Mick Robinson (United States) Bill Weston (United States) John Hofstra	Mazda 1.3L Rotary	**F**	154
31 DNF	GTP	2	(Switzerland) René Herzog	(United States) Hurley Haywood (Switzerland) René Herzog (United States) Scott Schubot	Porsche 962	**G**	151
31 DNF	GTP	2	(Switzerland) René Herzog	(United States) Hurley Haywood (Switzerland) René Herzog (United States) Scott Schubot	Porsche 3.0L Flat 6 Twin-Turbo	**G**	151
32 DNF	Lights	9	(United States) Essex Racing	(United States) Howard Katz (France) Ferdinand de Lesseps (United States) Jay Cochran	Spice SE88P	**G**	150
32 DNF	Lights	9	(United States) Essex Racing	(United States) Howard Katz (France) Ferdinand de Lesseps (United States) Jay Cochran	Buick 3.0L V6 N/A	**G**	150
33	GTO	04	(United States) Henry Brosnaham	(United States) Henry Brosnaham (United States) Steve Burgner (United States) Robert McElheny (United States) Angel Figueiras	Chevrolet Camaro	**G**	142
33	GTO	04	(United States) Henry Brosnaham	(United States) Henry Brosnaham (United States) Steve Burgner (United States) Robert McElheny (United States) Angel Figueiras	Chevrolet 5.7L V8 N/A	**G**	142
34 DNF	GTO	63	(United States) Downing/Atlanta	(United States) Jim Downing (United States) Amos Johnson (United States) John O'Steen	Mazda RX-7	**G**	137
34 DNF	GTO	63	(United States) Downing/Atlanta	(United States) Jim Downing (United States) Amos Johnson (United States) John O'Steen	Mazda 2.6L 4 Rotor	**G**	137
35 DNF	GTU	07	(United States) Full Time Racing	(United States) Mike Davies (United States) Stu Hayner	Dodge Daytona	**Y**	103
35 DNF	GTU	07	(United States) Full Time Racing	(United States) Mike Davies (United States) Stu Hayner	Dodge 2.4L I4 N/A	**Y**	103
36 DNF	GTO	29	(United States) Overbagh Racing	(United States) E. J. Generotti (United States) Mark Montgomery	Chevrolet Camaro	**G**	102
36 DNF	GTO	29	(United States) Overbagh Racing	(United States) E. J. Generotti (United States) Mark Montgomery	Chevrolet 5.5L V8 N/A	**G**	102
37 DNF	Lights	79	(United States) Whitehall Motorsports	(United States) Ken Knott (United States) Marty Hinze (United States) Kenper Miller	Spice SE87L	**G**	98
37 DNF	Lights	79	(United States) Whitehall Motorsports	(United States) Ken Knott (United States) Marty Hinze (United States) Kenper Miller	Pontiac 3.0L I4 N/A	**G**	98
38 DNF	GTO	12	(United States) Overbagh Racing	(United States) Don Arpin (United States) Rex Ramsey (United States) Mark Montgomery	Pontiac Firebird	**G**	91
38 DNF	GTO	12	(United States) Overbagh Racing	(United States) Don Arpin (United States) Rex Ramsey (United States) Mark Montgomery	Pontiac 5.7L V8 N/A	**G**	91
39 DNF	GTO	21	(United States) Craig Rubright	(United States) Craig Rubright (United States) Kermit Upton	Chevrolet Camaro	**G**	86
39 DNF	GTO	21	(United States) Craig Rubright	(United States) Craig Rubright (United States) Kermit Upton	Chevrolet 5.7L V8 N/A	**G**	86
40 DNF	GTP	86	(United States) Bruce Leven	(France) Bob Wollek (United States) Dominic Dobson (South Africa) Sarel van der Merwe	Porsche 962	**G**	65
40 DNF	GTP	86	(United States) Bruce Leven	(France) Bob Wollek (United States) Dominic Dobson (South Africa) Sarel van der Merwe	Porsche 3.0L Flat 6 Twin-Turbo	**G**	65
41 DNF	GTO	74	74 Hunting Ranch	(United States) George Robinson (United States) Johnny Unser (United States) Paul Dallenbach	Ford Mustang	**G**	61
41 DNF	GTO	74	74 Hunting Ranch	(United States) George Robinson (United States) Johnny Unser (United States) Paul Dallenbach	Ford 6.0L V8 N/A	**G**	61
42 DNF	GTP	60	(United Kingdom) Castrol Jaguar Racing	(United States) Price Cobb (Denmark) John Nielsen	Jaguar XJR-12	**G**	56
42 DNF	GTP	60	(United Kingdom) Castrol Jaguar Racing	(United States) Price Cobb (Denmark) John Nielsen	Jaguar 6.0L V12 N/A	**G**	56
43 DNF	GTU	90	(United States) Louis D'Agostino	(United States) Louis D'Agostino (United States) Steve Kelton	Mazda RX-7	**G**	49
43 DNF	GTU	90	(United States) Louis D'Agostino	(United States) Louis D'Agostino (United States) Steve Kelton	Mazda 1.3L Rotary	**G**	49
44 DNF	GTU	50	(Canada) Rudy Bartling	(Canada) Rudy Bartling (United States) Werner Frank (Canada) Fritz Hochreuter	Porsche 911	**G**	45
44 DNF	GTU	50	(Canada) Rudy Bartling	(Canada) Rudy Bartling (United States) Werner Frank (Canada) Fritz Hochreuter	Porsche 3.0L Flat 6 N/A	**G**	45
45 DNF	GTP	23	(United States) DSR Motorsports	(Canada) Bill Adam (United States) Scott Harrington (Canada) David Seabrooke	Porsche 962	**G**	39
45 DNF	GTP	23	(United States) DSR Motorsports	(Canada) Bill Adam (United States) Scott Harrington (Canada) David Seabrooke	Porsche 3.0L Flat 6 Turbo	**G**	39
46 DNF	GTU	48	(United Kingdom) Red Line Racing	(United States) Mike Graham (United States) Cameron Worth (United States) Alan Crouch	BMW 325i	**G**	31
46 DNF	GTU	48	(United Kingdom) Red Line Racing	(United States) Mike Graham (United States) Cameron Worth (United States) Alan Crouch	BMW 3.0L I6 N/A	**G**	31
47 DNF	Lights	01	(United States) Racecraft International	(United States) George Sutcliffe (United Kingdom) Richard Jones (United States) Michael Dow	Spice SE87L	**G**	24
47 DNF	Lights	01	(United States) Racecraft International	(United States) George Sutcliffe (United Kingdom) Richard Jones (United States) Michael Dow	Pontiac 3.0L I4 N/A	**G**	24
48 DNF	Lights	58	(United States) Gary Wonzer Racing	(United States) Bill Bean (United States) Gary Wonzer (United States) Bruce Westcott	Lola T616	**HO**	14
48 DNF	Lights	58	(United States) Gary Wonzer Racing	(United States) Bill Bean (United States) Gary Wonzer (United States) Bruce Westcott	Mazda 1.3L 2 Rotor	**HO**	14
49 DNF	GTU	26	(United States) Alex Job	(United States) Chris Kraft (United States) Alex Job (United States) Jack Refenning	Porsche 911	**G**	14
49 DNF	GTU	26	(United States) Alex Job	(United States) Chris Kraft (United States) Alex Job (United States) Jack Refenning	Porsche 3.0L Flat 6 N/A	**G**	14
DNS	GTP	16	(United States) Dyson Racing	(United Kingdom) James Weaver (United States) Scott Pruett	Porsche 962	**G**	0
DNS	GTP	16	(United States) Dyson Racing	(United Kingdom) James Weaver (United States) Scott Pruett	Porsche 3.0L Flat 6 Twin-Turbo	**G**	0
DNS	Lights	4	(United States) S&L Racing	(United States) Linda Ludemann (United States) Scott Schubot	Spice SE88P	**G**	0
DNS	Lights	4	(United States) S&L Racing	(United States) Linda Ludemann (United States) Scott Schubot	Buick 3.0L V6 N/A	**G**	0
DNS	GTU	77	(Portugal) Juan Carlos Negron	(Portugal) Juan Negron (United States) Daniel Urrutia (United States) Luis Sereix	Mazda RX-7	?	0
DNS	GTU	77	(Portugal) Juan Carlos Negron	(Portugal) Juan Negron (United States) Daniel Urrutia (United States) Luis Sereix	Mazda Rotary	?	0
DNS	GTO	45	(Canada) Jack Boxstrom	(Canada) Jack Boxstrom	Pontiac Firebird	?	0
DNS	GTO	45	(Canada) Jack Boxstrom	(Canada) Jack Boxstrom	?	?	0
DNS	GTP	20	(United States) Consulier	(United States) Chet Fillip (United States) Ron Cortez (United States) Bruce MacInnes	Consulier GTP	?	0
DNS	GTP	20	(United States) Consulier	(United States) Chet Fillip (United States) Ron Cortez (United States) Bruce MacInnes	?	?	0
DNS	GTP	91	(United States) Consulier	(United States) Rick Titus (United States) Bruce MacInnes (United States) Chet Fillip	Consulier GTP	?	0
DNS	GTP	91	(United States) Consulier	(United States) Rick Titus (United States) Bruce MacInnes (United States) Chet Fillip	?	?	0

- Pole position: Derek Daly/Chip Robinson/Geoff Brabham, 1:55.767

=== Class Winners ===
Class	Winners	
GTP	Earl / Daly	Nissan GTP ZX-Turbo
GTP Lights	Hessert / Morgan	Spice SE88P
GTO	Gordon / Fish / St. James	Mercury Cougar XR-7
GTU	Loring / Leitzinger / Kurtz	Nissan 240SX
