= 1986 12 Hours of Sebring =

Endurance auto race

The 12 Hours of Sebring Grand Prix of Endurance, was the third round of the 1986 IMSA GT Championship and was held at the Sebring International Raceway, on March 22, 1986. Victory overall went to the No. 5 Bob Akin Motor Racing Porsche 962 driven by Bob Akin, Hans-Joachim Stuck, and Jo Gartner.

== Race results ==
Class winners in bold.

Pos	Class	No	Team	Drivers	Car	Tyre	Laps
1	**GTP**	**5**	**(United States) Bob Akin Motor Racing**	**(United States) Bob Akin (Germany) Hans-Joachim Stuck (Austria) Jo Gartner**	**Porsche 962**	**Y**	**287**
2	GTP	67	(United States) BF Goodrich	(United States) Darin Brassfield (United States) John Morton (United States) Jim Busby	Porsche 962	**BF**	279
3	GTP	14	(United States) Holbert Racing	(United States) Al Holbert (United Kingdom) Derek Bell (United States) Al Unser Jr.	Porsche 962	**G**	269
4	**GTO**	**7**	**(United States) 7-Eleven/Roush Racing**	**(United States) Scott Pruett (United States) Bruce Jenner**	**Ford Mustang**	**G**	**265**
5	GTO	50	(United States) Roush/Folger's/Motorcraft	(United States) Bill Elliott (United States) Ricky Rudd	Ford Mustang	?	265
6	**Lights**	**66**	**(United States) STS-Mike Meyer Racing**	**(United States) Jim Rothbarth (United States) Mike Meyer (United States) Jeff Kline**	**Royale RP40**	?	**246**
7	GTO	88	(United States) Morrison Cook Motorsport	(United States) Ron Grable (United States) John Heinricy (United States) Bobby Carradine	Chevrolet Corvette	**G**	245
8	**GTU**	**38**	**(United States) Mandeville Auto Tech**	**(United States) Roger Mandeville (United States) Danny Smith**	**Mazda RX-7**	?	**240**
9	Lights	63	(United States) Certified Brakes Racing	(United States) Jim Downing (United States) John Maffucci (United States) John O'Steen	Argo JM19	**G**	238
10 DNF	GTO	92	(United States) Van Every Racing	(United States) Lance van Every (United States) Ash Tisdelle (United States) Rusty Bond	Chevrolet Camaro	**G**	233
11	GTO	58	(United States) Rick Borlase	(United States) Rick Borlase (United States) Jim Torres (United States) Michael Hammond	Porsche 934	**F**	231
12	GTO	90	(United States) Road Circuit Technology	(United States) Les Delano (United Kingdom) Jeremy Nightingale (United States) Patty Moise	Chevrolet Camaro	**G**	230
13	GTU	75	(United States) C C R	(United States) Bob Reed (United States) Tommy Kendall (United States) John Hogdal	Mazda RX-7	**F**	226
14 DNF	GTU	35	(United States) Team Dallas	(United States) Jack Griffin (United States) Bobby Hefner (United States) Skip Winfree	Porsche 911 Carrera RSR	**G**	225
15	GTP	16	(United States) MHR Racing	(United States) Marty Hinze (United States) Jack Newsum (United States) Tom Blackaller	Porsche 935 K3	**G**	222
16	GTU	78	(United States) 901 Racing	(United States) Peter Uria (United States) Larry Figaro (United States) Jack Refenning	Porsche 911 Carrera RSR	**G**	220
17	Lights	61	(United States) Deco Sales	(United States) Brent O'Neill (United States) Steve Shelton (United States) Don Courtney	Argo JM16	?	219
18	GTU	45	(United States) Turbo Concepts	(United States) Herman Galeano (United States) Christian Jacobs (United States) Pedro Cardenas	Porsche 911	**G**	209
19	GTO	62	(United States) Roush Racing	(Dominican Republic) Chris Marte (United States) Tim Coconis	Ford Mustang	**G**	200
20	Lights	29	(United States) Ares Sports	(United States) Ron Canizares (United States) Bill Jacobson (United States) Howard Katz	Tiga GT285	?	198
21	GTU	39	(Canada) R&H Racing	(Canada) Rainer Brezinka (Canada) Rudy Bartling (Canada) John Centano	Porsche 911	**G**	197
22	Lights	42	(United States) White/Allen Porsche	(United States) John Higgins (United States) Chip Mead (United States) Howard Cherry	Fabcar CL	**B**	184
23 DNF	Lights	22	(United States) Team 22/Sherri Cup	(United States) Paul Corazzo (United States) Ed Flemke (United States) Tom Hessert	Royale RP40	**HO**	181
24 DNF	Lights	6	(United States) Morgan Performance	(United States) Charles Morgan (United States) Logan Blackburn	Tiga GT286	**B**	181
25 DNF	GTO	34	(Dominican Republic) Latino Racing	(Costa Rica) Kikos Fonseca (Dominican Republic) Luis Mendez (El Salvador) "Jamsal"	Porsche 934	**F**	174
26	GTO	64	(United States) Raintree Corporation	(United States) Lanny Hester (United States) Maurice Hassey	Ford Mustang	**G**	173
27	GTO	26	(United States) Bob's Speed Products	(United States) Del Russo Taylor (United States) Mike Hackney (United States) Arvid Albanese	Pontiac Firebird	**G**	172
28 DNF	GTO	02	(United States) Spirit Racing	(United States) Wally Dallenbach Jr. (Republic of Ireland) Tommy Byrne	Chevrolet Camaro	**G**	171
29 DNF	GTO	87	(United States) Morrison Cook Motorsport	(United States) Don Knowles (United States) Bob McConnell (United States) Tommy Morrison	Chevrolet Corvette	**G**	171
30 DNF	GTU	17	(United States) Al Bacon Racing	(United States) Al Bacon (United States) Bill Scott (United States) Dennis Krueger	Mazda RX-7	**B**	168
31	GTU	54	(United States) S P Racing	(United States) Gary Auberlen (United States) Peter Jauker (United States) Cary Eisenlohr (United States) Karl Durkheimer	Porsche 911 Carrera RSR	**B**	166
32 DNF	Lights	37	(United States) Burdsall/Newsome Racing	(United States) Roy Newsome (United States) Tom Burdsall (United States) Peter Welter	Tiga GT285	**HO**	162
33 DNF	GTP	99	(United Kingdom) Roy Baker Promotions	(Greece) Costas Los (United Kingdom) Dudley Wood	Tiga GC285	?	160
34	GTU	21	(United States) Wonzer Racing	(United States) John Hofstra (United States) Charles Slater (United States) Mick Robinson	Porsche 911	**G**	160
35 DNF	GTU	60	(Dominican Republic) Latino Racing	(Dominican Republic) Luis Mendez (Colombia) Mauricio de Narváez	Porsche 911 Carrera RSR	**F**	159
36	GTU	57	(United States) Kryderacing	(United States) Reed Kryder (United States) Tom Palmer (United States) Todd Morici	Nissan 280ZX	**G**	157
37 DNF	GTO	31	(United States) CRT Contracting Corporation	(United States) Ken Bupp (United States) Guy Church (United States) E. J. Generotti	Chevrolet Camaro	**HO**	156
38 DNF	Lights	11	(United States) Kendall Racing	(United States) Chuck Kendall (United States) Paul Lewis (United States) Max Jones	Lola T616	**B**	153
39 DNF	GTP	46	(United States) R C Buick Hawk	(United States) John Paul Jr. (United States) Whitney Ganz (United States) Ken Madren	March 85G	**G**	151
40	GTO	85	(United States) Highlands County Racing	(United States) William Boyer (United States) Steve Roberts (United States) Mike Rand (United States) Robby Unser	Pontiac Firebird	?	151
41 DNF	GTU	71	(United States) Team Highball	(United States) Amos Johnson (United States) Dennis Shaw (United States) Jack Dunham	Mazda RX-7	**Y**	150
42 DNF	GTO	30	(United States) Skoal Bandits	(United States) Pancho Carter (United States) Buz McCall (United States) Tom Sheehy (United States) Walt Bohren	Chevrolet Camaro	**G**	147
43 DNF	GTO	47	(United States) Dingman Bros Racing	(United States) Elliot Forbes-Robinson (United States) Tommy Riggins	Pontiac Firebird	**G**	147
44 DNF	GTP	04	(United States) Group 44	(United Kingdom) Brian Redman (Australia) Vern Schuppan (United States) Hurley Haywood	Jaguar XJR-7	**G**	146
45 DNF	GTO	9	(United States) OMR Engines	(Canada) Ric Moore (United States) Hoyt Overbagh (United States) Chris Gennone	Chevrolet Camaro	**G**	145
46 DNF	GTP	8	(United States) Henn's Swap Shop Racing	(United States) Drake Olson (United States) A. J. Foyt	Porsche 962	**G**	141
47 DNF	GTU	89	(United States) Team Hunt Racing	(United States) Tom Hunt (United States) James Shelton	Mazda RX-7	**HO**	140
48 DNF	Lights	27	(United States) MSB Racing	(United States) Jim Fowells (United States) Dave Cowart (United States) Kenper Miller	Argo JM19	**HO**	136
49 DNF	GTP	82	(United States) K&P Racing	(United States) David Fuller (United States) Mark Montgomery	Chevrolet Corvette	?	127
50 DNF	GTU	08	(United States) Simms-Romano Enterprises	(United States) Paul Romano (United States) Jim Freeman (United States) James Nelson	Mazda RX-7	?	125
51 DNF	Lights	01	(United States) Gaston Andrey Racing	(United States) Roger Andrey (United States) Bob Herlin (United States) Rick Mancuso	Alba AR2	**B**	123
52 DNF	GTO	83	(United States) Shafer Racing	(United States) George Shafer (United States) Joe Maloy (United States) Bill McVay	Chevrolet Camaro	?	114
53 DNF	GTP	44	(United States) Group 44	(United States) Bob Tullius (United States) Chip Robinson (France) Claude Ballot-Léna	Jaguar XJR-7	**G**	106
54 DNF	Lights	93	(United States) Mid-O Racing	(United States) Kelly Marsh (United States) Ron Pawley (United States) Don Marsh	Argo JM16	?	102
55	GTO	96	(United States) Bob's Speed Products	(United States) Bob Lee (United States) Bill Julian (United States) Timothy S. Lee (United States) Jim Saxon	Buick Skyhawk	**G**	97
56 DNF	GTO	25	(United States) Lucas Truck Service	(United States) Tom Nehl (United States) Jim Fortin (United States) Scott Gaylord	Chevrolet Camaro	?	96
57	GTO	48	(United States) Gary Wonzer	(United States) Gary Wonzer (Puerto Rico) Miguel Pagan (United States) Bruce Dewey (United States) Tom Cripe	Porsche 911 Carrera RSR	?	94
58 DNF	GTU	41	(United States) Lion Rampant	(United States) Chaunce Wallace (United States) Van McDonald (United States) Kevin Bruce	Mazda RX-7	**B**	90
59 DNF	GTU	36	(United States) Case Racing	(United States) Ron Case (United States) Dave Panaccione	Porsche 924 Carrera GTR	**F**	83
60 DNF	GTO	98	(United States) All American Racers	(United States) Chris Cord (United States) Dennis Aase	Toyota Celica	**G**	73
61 DNF	GTO	28	(United States) Texas Enterprises/US Tobacco	(United States) Terry Labonte (United States) Phil Parsons (United States) Benny Parsons	Oldsmobile Calais	?	67
62 DNF	Lights	13	(United States) Outlaw Racing Team	(United States) Frank Rubino (United States) Ray Mummery (United States) Reggie Smith	Argo JM19	**HO**	65
63 DNF	GTO	51	(United States) Dave Heinz Imports	(United States) Dave Heinz (United States) Don Yenko (United States) Steve Zwiren	Chevrolet Corvette	?	65
64 DNF	GTO	76	(United States) Peerless Racing	(United States) Jack Baldwin (United States) Jim Miller	Chevrolet Camaro	**G**	57
65 DNF	Lights	80	(United States) Gaston Andrey Racing	(Italy) Carlo Facetti (Italy) Martino Finotto (Italy) Ruggero Melgrati	Alba AR6	**B**	41
66 DNF	GTP	05	(United States) Jerry Kendall	(United States) Jerry Kendall (United States) Dave White (United States) Werner Frank	Porsche 935	**G**	40
67 DNF	GTO	73	(United States) Eurospec Imports	(United States) Carlos Munoz (United States) Carlos Migoya (United States) Luis Albiza	Chevrolet Camaro	**G**	40
68 DNF	GTP	00	(United States) Hotchkis Racing	(United States) Jim Adams (United States) John Hotchkis (United States) John Kalagian	March 83G	**B**	38
69 DNF	GTP	86	(United States) Bayside Disposal Racing	(France) Bob Wollek (Italy) Paolo Barilla (United States) Bruce Leven	Porsche 962	**B**	36
70 DNF	GTU	24	(United States) Global Racing	(Argentina) Carlos Ruesch (United States) Hugo Gralia (United States) Alan Andrea (United States) John Clark	Mazda RX-7	**HO**	28
71 DNF	GTO	69	(United States) Rick Balderson	(United States) Bill Gardner (United States) John Greene (United States) Steve Noffke	Chevrolet Monza	**HO**	28
72 DNF	GTO	55	(United States) Bud Light Corvette	(United States) Craig Rubright (United States) Greg Walker (United States) Nort Northam	Chevrolet Corvette	?	27
73 DNF	GTO	77	(United States) Sunrise Racing	(United States) Jeff Loving (United States) James Lee	Chevrolet Camaro	?	16
74 DNF	GTP	0	(Germany) Joest Racing	(Italy) Giampiero Moretti (United States) Randy Lanier (Germany) "John Winter"	Porsche 962	**G**	10
75 DNF	GTP	4	(United States) Lee Racing	(United States) Jim Mullen (United States) Lew Price (United States) Carson Baird	Chevrolet Corvette GTP	?	9
76 DNF	GTO	72	(United States) Whitehall-Rocketsports	(United States) Bob Bergstrom (United States) Paul Gentilozzi (United States) Gene Felton (United States) Tom Winters	Oldsmobile Toronado	?	9
DNS	GTU	91	(United States) Foreign Matter Racing	(United States) Fin Tomlinson (United States) John Finger (United States) Ron Finger	Mazda RX-7	**Y**	0
DNS	GTO	56	(United States) Hi-Fi Hospital	(United States) Bob Henderson (United States) Timothy Lee (United States) Victor Costanzo	Chevrolet Camaro	?	0
DNS	GTP	12	(Germany) BMW North America	(United Kingdom) David Hobbs (United Kingdom) John Watson	BMW GTP	**G**	0
DNS	GTP	18	(Germany) BMW North America	(United States) Bobby Rahal (United Kingdom) John Watson	BMW GTP	**G**	0
DNS	GTP	19	(Germany) BMW North America	(United States) John Andretti (United States) Davy Jones	BMW GTP	**G**	0
DNS	GTP	68	(United States) BF Goodrich	(United States) Jim Busby (Argentina) Oscar Larrauri	Porsche 962	**BF**	0
DNS	Lights	79	(United States) Whitehall-Rocketsports	(United States) Skeeter McKitterick (United States) Bill Koll	Alba AR5	?	0

=== Class Winners ===
Class	Winners	
GTP	Akin / Stuck / Gartner	Porsche 962
Lights	Rothbarth / Meyer / Kline	Royale RP40
GTO	Elliott / Rudd	Ford Mustang
GTU	Mandeville / Smith	Mazda RX-7
