= 1998 Sebring Classic =

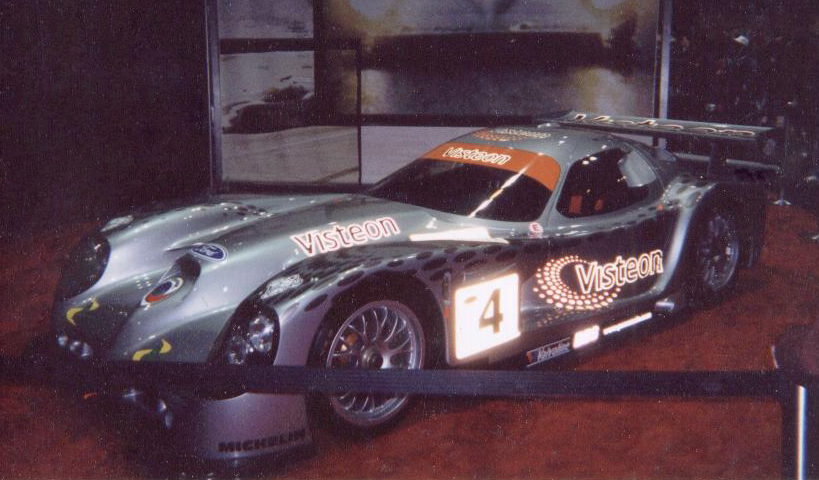
Race-winning Panoz GTR-1

The 1998 NAPA Auto Parts Sebring Classic presented by Royal Purple Motor Oil was the sixth round of the 1998 IMSA GT Championship season. It took place on September 20, 1998.

David Brabham and Andy Wallace were the winners.

== Race results ==
Class winners in bold.

Pos	Class	No	Team	Drivers	Chassis	Tyre	Laps
Pos	Class	No	Team	Drivers	Engine	Tyre	Laps
1	**GT1**	**4**	**(United States) Panoz Motorsports**	**(Australia) David Brabham (United Kingdom) Andy Wallace**	**Panoz GTR-1**	**MI**	**33**
1	**GT1**	**4**	**(United States) Panoz Motorsports**	**(Australia) David Brabham (United Kingdom) Andy Wallace**	**Ford (Roush) 6.0L V8**	**MI**	**33**
2	**WSC**	**16**	**(United States) Dyson Racing**	**(United Kingdom) James Weaver (United States) Butch Leitzinger**	**Riley & Scott Mk III**	**G**	**33**
2	**WSC**	**16**	**(United States) Dyson Racing**	**(United Kingdom) James Weaver (United States) Butch Leitzinger**	**Ford 5.0L V8**	**G**	**33**
3	WSC	20	(United States) Dyson Racing	(United States) Dorsey Schroeder (United States) Elliot Forbes-Robinson	Riley & Scott Mk III	**G**	33
3	WSC	20	(United States) Dyson Racing	(United States) Dorsey Schroeder (United States) Elliot Forbes-Robinson	Ford 5.0L V8	**G**	33
4	WSC	8	(United States) Transatlantic Racing Services	(United States) Henry Camferdam (United States) Scott Schubot	Riley & Scott Mk III	**G**	33
4	WSC	8	(United States) Transatlantic Racing Services	(United States) Henry Camferdam (United States) Scott Schubot	Ford 5.0L V8	**G**	33
5	WSC	97	(United States) Team Cascadia	(United States) Ed Zabinski (United States) Shane Lewis	Argo JM20	**G**	33
5	WSC	97	(United States) Team Cascadia	(United States) Ed Zabinski (United States) Shane Lewis	Chevrolet SB-2 6.0L V8	**G**	33
6	WSC	36	(United States) Matthews-Colucci Racing	(United States) David Murry (United States) Jim Matthews	Riley & Scott Mk III	**G**	33
6	WSC	36	(United States) Matthews-Colucci Racing	(United States) David Murry (United States) Jim Matthews	Ford 5.0L V8	**G**	33
7	WSC	92	(United States) Denaba Racing	(United States) A.J. Smith (United States) Joaquin DeSoto	Kudzu DLM	?	33
7	WSC	92	(United States) Denaba Racing	(United States) A.J. Smith (United States) Joaquin DeSoto	Buick 4.5L V6	?	33
8	**GT2**	**99**	**(United States) Schumacher Racing**	**(United States) Larry Schumacher (United States) John O'Steen**	**Porsche 911 GT2**	**P**	**33**
8	**GT2**	**99**	**(United States) Schumacher Racing**	**(United States) Larry Schumacher (United States) John O'Steen**	**Porsche 3.6L Turbo Flat-6**	**P**	**33**
9	GT2	54	(United States) Bell Motorsports	(United States) Scott Neuman (United Kingdom) Andy Pilgrim	BMW M3	?	33
9	GT2	54	(United States) Bell Motorsports	(United States) Scott Neuman (United Kingdom) Andy Pilgrim	BMW 3.2L I6	?	33
10	**GT3**	**22**	**(United States) Alex Job Racing**	**(United States) Cort Wagner (United States) Kelly Collins**	**Porsche 964 Carrera RSR**	**P**	**33**
10	**GT3**	**22**	**(United States) Alex Job Racing**	**(United States) Cort Wagner (United States) Kelly Collins**	**Porsche 3.8L Flat-6**	**P**	**33**
11	GT3	23	(United States) Alex Job Racing	(United States) Kelly Collins (United States) Darryl Havens	Porsche 964 Carrera RSR	**P**	32
11	GT3	23	(United States) Alex Job Racing	(United States) Kelly Collins (United States) Darryl Havens	Porsche 3.8L Flat-6	**P**	32
12	WSC	63	(United States) Downing Atlanta	(United States) Rich Grupp (United States) Jim Downing	Kudzu DLM	**G**	32
12	WSC	63	(United States) Downing Atlanta	(United States) Rich Grupp (United States) Jim Downing	Mazda 2.0L 3-Rotor	**G**	32
13	GT3	6	(United States) Prototype Technology Group	(United States) Peter Cunningham (Canada) Ross Bentley	BMW M3	**Y**	32
13	GT3	6	(United States) Prototype Technology Group	(United States) Peter Cunningham (Canada) Ross Bentley	BMW 3.2L I6	**Y**	32
14	GT3	10	(United States) Prototype Technology Group	(United States) Bill Auberlen (United States) Mark Simo	BMW M3	**Y**	32
14	GT3	10	(United States) Prototype Technology Group	(United States) Bill Auberlen (United States) Mark Simo	BMW 3.2L I6	**Y**	32
15	GT3	86	(United States) G&W Motorsports	(United States) Darren Law (United States) Steve Marshall	Porsche 993 Carrera RSR	**P**	32
15	GT3	86	(United States) G&W Motorsports	(United States) Darren Law (United States) Steve Marshall	Porsche 3.8L Flat-6	**P**	32
16	GT2	56	(United States) Martin Snow Racing	(United States) Martin Snow (United States) Melanie Snow	Porsche 911 GT2	**D**	31
16	GT2	56	(United States) Martin Snow Racing	(United States) Martin Snow (United States) Melanie Snow	Porsche 3.6L Turbo Flat-6	**D**	31
17	GT1	77	(United States) G&W Motorsports	(United States) Darren Law (United States) Danny Marshall	Porsche 911 GT1	**P**	31
17	GT1	77	(United States) G&W Motorsports	(United States) Darren Law (United States) Danny Marshall	Porsche 3.2L Turbo Flat-6	**P**	31
18	GT1	5	(United States) Panoz Motorsports	(France) Éric Bernard (United States) Johnny O'Connell	Panoz GTR-1	**MI**	29
18	GT1	5	(United States) Panoz Motorsports	(France) Éric Bernard (United States) Johnny O'Connell	Ford (Roush) 6.0L V8	**MI**	29
19 DNF	WSC	28	(United States) Intersport Racing	(United States) Jon Field (Canada) Jacek Mucha (United States) Butch Brickell	Riley & Scott Mk III	**G**	23
19 DNF	WSC	28	(United States) Intersport Racing	(United States) Jon Field (Canada) Jacek Mucha (United States) Butch Brickell	Ford 5.0L V8	**G**	23
20 DNF	WSC	7	(United States) Doyle-Risi Racing	(South Africa) Wayne Taylor (Belgium) Eric van de Poele	Ferrari 333 SP	**P**	11
20 DNF	WSC	7	(United States) Doyle-Risi Racing	(South Africa) Wayne Taylor (Belgium) Eric van de Poele	Ferrari F310E 4.0L V12	**P**	11
