= Gene Felton =

American race car driver (1936–2020)

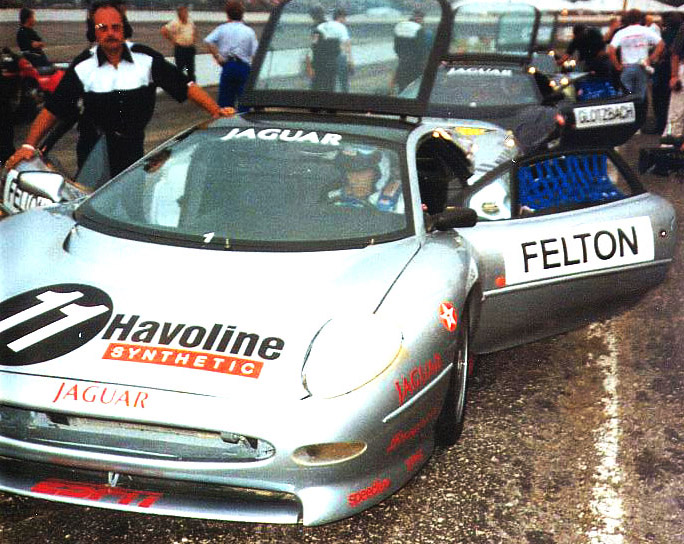
- Felton in the pits at the 1993 Fast Masters event
- Born: May 11, 1936; Atlanta, Georgia, U.S.
- Died: November 6, 2020 (aged 84); Roswell, Georgia, U.S.
- Military career
- Allegiance: United States of America
- Branch: Marines
- Service years: 1958-1971
- Rank: Captain Company Commander
- Website: www.genefeltonrestorations.com/index.html

Gene Felton (May 11, 1936 – November 6, 2020) was an American race car driver. He hailed from Atlanta, Georgia. Felton graduated from the University of North Carolina and served in the United States Marine Corps (USMC). He resided in Roswell, Georgia. at the time of his death.

== Amateur racing career ==
Felton began his motor sports career drag racing. In 1954, he had six wins as a drag racer.

From 1958 to 1960, while in the USMC, Felton raced motorcycles in Okinawa, Japan and won a championship consisting of 13 Pacer's Motorcycle Club Okinawa wins.

In 1964, Felton won the Chimney Rock Hillclimb which was the first event he ever entered. In 1967, Felton was the Sports Car Club of America (SCCA) A Sedan Class Southeastern regional champion. Over the course of 1964 to 1969, he had 42 wins.

In 1971, Felton was the SCCA D Production Class Southeastern regional champion. Also in 1971, he was the Peachbowl Speedway Ministock champion. In 1971, he also competed in the NASCAR Grand American series and garnered three top-five finishes.

== Early professional racing career ==
In 1972, Felton won his first professional race, the International Motor Sports Association (IMSA) Camel GT series Presidential 250 at Daytona International Speedway. This race was only his third professional race. Gene raced a big block Camaro during this win. Felton would go on to having 13 wins at Daytona.

In 1973, Felton won another 250-mile race, the IMSA Camel GT series Paul Revere 250, at Daytona. He drove the same big block Camaro from the 1972 Presidential 250 during this race. In 1976, he qualified for his first NASCAR Grand National race at the Atlanta Motor Speedway Dixie 500. He finished 16th driving for Junie Donlavey. From 1974 through 1977, Felton garnered 15 IMSA Champion Spark Plug Series event wins. During this time, he competed in NASCAR Permatex Modified Series in the same Camaro.

From 1977 through 1980, Felton won the IMSA Kelly American Challenge series all four years. During this run, he accumulated 25 wins. In the 1980 season, he qualified for the pole and won all nine races.

Also in 1980, Felton had three wins at the Dixie Speedway racing on a 3/8 mile dirt track.

In 1981 and 1982, Felton was runner-up for consecutive years in the IMSA American Challenge series.

In 1982, Felton was runner-up in the GTO Class at the 24 Hours of Le Mans race at the Circuit de la Sarthe in Sarthe, France. These wins occurred during the 1982 IMSA Championship Season.

In 1983, Felton had three wins during the 1983 IMSA Championship Season including the Miami Grand Prix. He also won the first Trans-Am race in which he was entered, beating out David Hobbs and other factory teams.

In 1984, Felton won the GTO Class at the 24 Hours race at Daytona. He also won 12 Hours of Sebring, Road Atlanta, Charlotte, Pocono, and the first Miami Grand Prix event in the GTO Class. These wins occurred during the 1984 IMSA Championship Season. He co-drove with Terry LaBonte and car owner, Billy Hagan. Felton was the points leader until the team folded due to a lack of funds. He won six races and set seventeen IMSA GTO track records. Felton's accolades in 1984 include two second-place finishes, two third-place finishes, nine top-five finishes, eleven top-ten finishes, eleven pole positions, six fastest race lap times records, and eleven qualifying records. He also competed in several American Challenge races finishing season with one win and two second place. He finished second in the GT championship competing in only a half a season.

In October 1984, Felton was critically injured during a Trans-Am race at the Riverside International Speedway in California. He sustained severe injuries to the neck and spine to include his vocal chords. While in the hospital, Felton was advised by IMSA that he had surpassed Peter Gregg and Hurley Haywood in overall wins and that he had become IMSA's winningest driver.

== Late racing career ==
In 1985 through 1986, Felton continued to race in IMSA Kelly American Challenge and GTO series events. He accomplished seven top-five finishes including one win.

In 1992, Felton founded the Historic Stock Car Race series and was the HSR Sprint Challenge champion. He continued to race in historic stock car racing events and has accumulated 91 wins, to date. He also began buying and restoring older NASCAR race cars at this time.

== Later years and death ==
From 1992 to 2019, Felton restored road course race-ready cars along with other select race cars. Gene also raced in historic stock car racing events in which he had gathered over 45 wins. Felton was a member of the Road Racing Driver's Club.

Felton died on November 6, 2020, after long period of emphysema.

== Honors ==
1979 - IMSA Mechanic of the Year

Feb 1984 - Motor Trend Illustrated Racer of the Week

Apr 1985 - Champion Racer of the Week

1993 - Invited & Competed in Fastmasters Championship

1993 - Nominated for International Motorsports Hall of Fame

1999 - Invited & Competed in Pro-Am Champion Celebrity Race in Tustin, CA

In 2003, Felton was nominated to the International Motor Sports Hall of Fame.

2003-2009 - Invited and Competed in Goodwood Festival of Speed in England, U.K.

In 2005, Felton was inducted into the Georgia Automobile Racing Hall of Fame. He had 12 championships, 50 total professional wins, 215 podium finishes, won 70 poles, and held or holds 63 records in a short professional career and 15 racing series. Gene Felton has driven for 42 teams and in cars built by 14 different manufacturers. He has been called "one of America's top road race drivers."

2009 - Victory Lane Magazine Award

Darlington Historic Racing Festival
