= 1989 IMSA GT Championship =

19th season of the racing series organized by IMSA

Seasons
- ← 1988 1990 →

The 1989 Camel GT Championship season was the 19th season of the IMSA GT Championship auto racing series. It was for GTP and Lights classes of prototypes, as well as Grand Tourer-style racing cars which ran in the GTO and GTU classes, as well as a tube-frame American Challenge (AC) class during select GT-only rounds. It began February 4, 1989, and ended October 22, 1989, after twenty rounds.

== Schedule ==
The GT and Prototype classes did not participate in all events, nor did they race together at shorter events. The AC class only participated in GT-only events. Races marked with All had all classes on track at the same time.

Rnd	Race	Length	Class	Circuit	Date
1	SunBank 24 at Daytona	24 Hours	All	Daytona International Speedway	February 4–5
2	Nissan Grand Prix of Miami	45 Minutes	GT	Streets of Miami	March 5
2	Nissan Grand Prix of Miami	3 Hours	Proto	Streets of Miami	March 5
3	12 Hours of Sebring	12 Hours	All	Sebring International Raceway	March 18
4	Nissan Grand Prix of Atlanta	500 km	Proto	Road Atlanta	April 2
5	Pontiac Grand Prix of Palm Beach	3 Hours	Proto	West Palm Beach Street Circuit	April 23
6	Summit Point Grand Prix	2 Hours 30 Minutes	GT	Summit Point Raceway	May 21
7	Toyota Trucks Lime Rock Grand Prix	150 Laps, 229.5 mi (369.3 km)	Proto	Lime Rock Park	May 29
8	Nissan Grand Prix of Ohio	500 km	Proto	Mid-Ohio Sports Car Course	June 4
8	Nissan Grand Prix of Ohio	200 km	GT	Mid-Ohio Sports Car Course	June 4
9	Audi quattro IMSA Weekend	500 km	GT	Mosport Park	June 25
10	Camel Continental	500 km	Proto	Watkins Glen International	July 2
11	Miller High Life 500	500 km	All	Road America	July 16
12	G.I. Joe's Camel Grand Prix	1 Hour 30 Minutes	GT	Portland International Raceway	July 30
12	G.I. Joe's Camel Grand Prix	300 km	Proto	Portland International Raceway	July 30
13	Camel Grand Prix of the Heartland	2 Hours	GT	Heartland Park	August 12
13	Camel Grand Prix of the Heartland	300 km	Proto	Heartland Park	August 13
14	Nissan Camel Grand Prix of San Antonio	1 Hour	GT	San Antonio Street Circuit	September 3
14	Nissan Camel Grand Prix of San Antonio	2 Hours	Proto	San Antonio Street Circuit	September 3
15	Lincoln-Mercury California Grand Prix	300 km	Proto	Sears Point Raceway	September 10
15	Lincoln-Mercury California Grand Prix	200 km	GT	Sears Point Raceway	September 10
16	Kodak Copier 500	500 km	GT	Watkins Glen International	September 24
17	GTE World Challenge of Tampa	360 km	Proto	Tampa Street Circuit	October 1
18	Lime Rock 2 Hours	2 Hours	GT	Lime Rock Park	October 1
19	Toyota Monterey Grand Prix	1 Hour	GT	Laguna Seca Raceway	October 15
20	Camel Grand Prix of Southern California	1 Hour	GT	Del Mar Fairgrounds	October 22
20	Camel Grand Prix of Southern California	2 Hours	Proto	Del Mar Fairgrounds	October 22

== Season results ==
Rnd	Circuit	GTP Winning Team	Lights Winning Team	GTO Winning Team	GTU Winning Team	Results
Rnd	Circuit	GTP Winning Drivers	Lights Winning Drivers	GTO Winning Drivers	GTU Winning Drivers	Results
1	Daytona	(United States) #67 Miller-BF Goodrich	(United States) #9 Essex Racing	(United States) #16 Stroh's Light Cougar	(United States) #17 Al Bacon Performance	Results
1	Daytona	(France) Bob Wollek (United Kingdom) Derek Bell (United States) John Andretti	(United States) Charles Morgan (United States) John Morrison (United States) Tom Hessert	(United States) Pete Halsmer (United States) Bob Earl (United States) Mark Martin (United Kingdom) Paul Stewart	(United States) Al Bacon (United States) Bob Reed (New Zealand) Rod Millen	Results
2	Miami	(United States) #83 Electramotive Eng.	(United States) #4 S&L Racing	(United States) #6 Roush Racing	(United States) #72 John Finger	Results
2	Miami	(United States) Chip Robinson (Australia) Geoff Brabham	(United States) Scott Schubot	(United States) Pete Halsmer	(United States) John Finger	Results
3	Sebring	(United States) #83 Electramotive Eng.	(United States) #55 Huffaker Racing	(United States) #11 Roush Racing	(United States) #74 Huffaker Racing	Results
3	Sebring	(United States) Chip Robinson (Australia) Geoff Brabham (Netherlands) Arie Luyendyk	(United States) Bob Lesnett (United States) Dan Marvin	(United States) Wally Dallenbach Jr. (United States) Dorsey Schroeder	(United States) George Robinson (United States) Bart Kendall (United States) Johnny Unser	Results
4	Road Atlanta	(United States) #83 Electramotive Eng.	(United States) #4 S&L Racing	Did Not Participate	Did Not Participate	Results
4	Road Atlanta	(United States) Chip Robinson (Australia) Geoff Brabham	(United States) Scott Schubot			Results
5	Palm Beach	(United States) #67 Busby Racing	(United States) #4 S&L Racing	Did Not Participate	Did Not Participate	Results
5	Palm Beach	(France) Bob Wollek (United States) John Andretti	(United States) Scott Schubot (United States) Linda Ludemann			Results
6	Summit Point	Did Not Participate	Did Not Participate	(West Germany) #4 Audi of America	(United States) #74 Robinson Racing	Results
6	Summit Point			(West Germany) Hans-Joachim Stuck	(United States) George Robinson	Results
7	Lime Rock	(United States) #84 Electramotive Eng.	(United States) #9 Essex Racing	Did Not Participate	Did Not Participate	Results
7	Lime Rock	(Australia) Geoff Brabham	(United States) Charles Morgan (United States) Jeff Purner			Results
8	Mid-Ohio	(United States) #83 Electramotive Eng.	(United States) #9 Essex Racing	(West Germany) #4 Audi of America	(United States) #71 Team Highball	Results
8	Mid-Ohio	(United States) Chip Robinson (Australia) Geoff Brabham	(United States) Charles Morgan (United States) Tom Hessert	(West Germany) Hans-Joachim Stuck	(United States) Amos Johnson	Results
9	Mosport Park	Did Not Participate	Did Not Participate	(United States) #6 Roush Racing	(United States) #00 Full Time Racing	Results
9	Mosport Park			(United States) Pete Halsmer	(Canada) Jeremy Dale	Results
10	Watkins Glen	(United States) #84 Electramotive Eng.	(United States) #63 Mazda	Did Not Participate	Did Not Participate	Results
10	Watkins Glen	(United States) Chip Robinson (Australia) Geoff Brabham	(United States) Jim Downing (United States) Howard Katz			Results
11	Road America	(United States) #83 Electromotive Eng.	(United States) #4 S&L Racing	(United States) #7 Cunningham Racing	(United States) #71 Team Highball	Results
11	Road America	(United States) Chip Robinson (Australia) Geoff Brabham	(United States) Scott Schubot	(New Zealand) Steve Millen	(United States) Amos Johnson	Results
12	Portland	(United Kingdom) #60 Castrol Jaguar	(United States) #63 Downing Atlanta	(United States) #6 Roush Racing	(United States) #00 Full Time Racing	Results
12	Portland	(United States) Price Cobb (Netherlands) Jan Lammers	(United States) Jim Downing (United States) Howard Katz	(United States) Pete Halsmer	(United States) Kal Showket	Results
13	Heartland Park	(United States) #83 Electramotive Eng.	(United States) #4 S&L Racing	(West Germany) #4 Audi of America	(United States) #95 Leitzinger Racing	Results
13	Heartland Park	(Australia) Geoff Brabham	(United States) Scott Schubot (United States) Linda Ludemann	(West Germany) Hans-Joachim Stuck	(United States) Bob Leitzinger	Results
14	San Antonio Street Circuit	(United States) #84 Electramotive Eng.	(United States) #4 S&L Racing	(United States) #9 Roush Racing	(United States) #95 Leitzinger Racing	Results
14	San Antonio Street Circuit	(United States) Chip Robinson	(United States) Scott Schubot (United States) Linda Ludemann	(United States) Wally Dallenbach Jr.	(United States) Bob Leitzinger	Results
15	Sears Point Raceway	(United States) #83 Electramotive Eng.	(United States) #4 S&L Racing	(West Germany) #4 Audi of America	(United States) #07 Full Time Racing	Results
15	Sears Point Raceway	(Australia) Geoff Brabham	(United States) Scott Schubot (United States) Linda Ludemann	(West Germany) Hans-Joachim Stuck	(Canada) Jeremy Dale	Results
16	Watkins Glen	Did Not Participate	Did Not Participate	(West Germany) #4 Audi of America	(United States) #17 Al Bacon Performance	Results
16	Watkins Glen			(West Germany) Hans-Joachim Stuck (West Germany) Walter Röhrl	(United States) Al Bacon	Results
17	Tampa Street Circuit	(United Kingdom) #60 Castrol Jaguar	(United States) #9 Essex Racing	Did Not Participate	Did Not Participate	Results
17	Tampa Street Circuit	(United States) Price Cobb	(United States) Charles Morgan (United States) Tom Hessert			Results
18	Lime Rock	Did Not Participate	Did Not Participate	(West Germany) #4 Audi of America	(United States) #00 Full Time Racing	Results
18	Lime Rock			(West Germany) Hans-Joachim Stuck	(United States) Kal Showket	Results
19	Laguna Seca	Did Not Participate	Did Not Participate	(West Germany) #4 Audi of America	(United States) #07 Full Time Racing	Results
19	Laguna Seca			(West Germany) Hans-Joachim Stuck	(Canada) Jeremy Dale	Results
20	Del Mar Fairgrounds	(United Kingdom) #60 Castrol Jaguar	(United States) #4 S&L Racing	(United States) #9 Roush Racing	(United States) #07 Full Time Racing	Results
20	Del Mar Fairgrounds	(Netherlands) Jan Lammers	(United States) Scott Schubot (United States) Linda Ludemann	(United States) Wally Dallenbach Jr.	(Canada) Jeremy Dale	Results
