= Grand Prix of Miami (sports car racing) =

Sports car race series in Florida, US

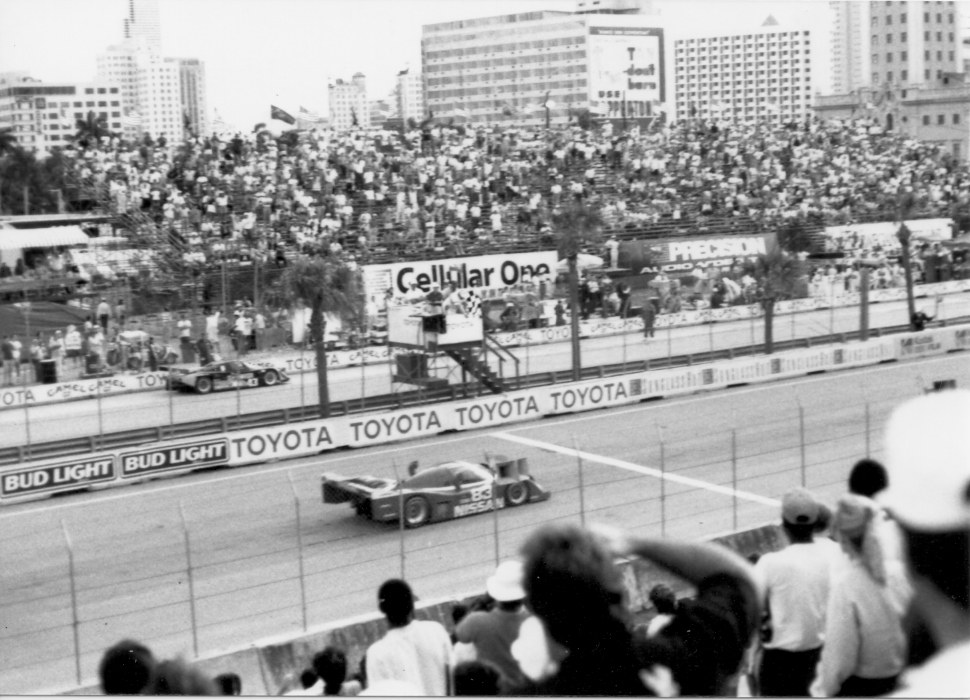
Geoff Brabham in the Nissan NPT-91 about to take the checkered flag at the conclusion of the 1992 Miami Grand Prix on the Bicentennial Park circuit.

The Trans-Am Series, Rolex Sports Car Series, and American Le Mans Series have all held races in the Miami area.

== IMSA ==
Promoter Ralph Sanchez brought auto racing to the Miami area in 1983. A course at Bicentennial Park featured the IMSA GT Championship and the inaugural Grand Prix of Miami. A 1.85-mile (2.98 km) circuit was laid out on the park roads and Biscayne Boulevard. The 1983 event was a failure both competitively and financially. A severe rainstorm flooded the circuit, and stopped the race after less than one-sixth of the distance was completed. Despite not being obligated to, Sanchez decided to pay the entire purse to the competitors, absorbing a $1.3 million loss but earning great respect from the racing fraternity.

A year later, the event returned, and grew into a huge success.

IMSA races were held at the first Bicentennial Park from 1983 until 1985. In 1986, the event moved to a new layout, also located at Bicentennial Park. The new Bicentennial Park circuit was a semi-permanent layout that featured purpose-built roads in the park area, along with a temporary segment taking it out on Biscayne Boulevard near the entrance to the Port of Miami. The event continued through 1993, at which time IMSA itself was experiencing a period of decline and reorganization.

| Season | Date | Race name | Overall winner(s) | Car | Team |
Bicentennial Park
| 1983 | February 27 | Budweiser Grand Prix of Miami | (United States) Al Holbert | March 83G-Chevrolet | Holbert Racing |
| 1984 | February 26 | Budweiser Grand Prix of Miami | (United States) Doc Bundy (United Kingdom) Brian Redman | Jaguar XJR-5 | Group 44 |
| 1985 | February 24 | Löwenbräu Grand Prix of Miami | (United States) Al Holbert (United Kingdom) Derek Bell | Porsche 962 | Holbert Racing |
| 1986 | March 2 | Löwenbräu Grand Prix of Miami | (France) Bob Wollek (Italy) Paolo Barilla | Porsche 962 | Bayside Leven Racing |
| 1987 | March 1 | Grand Prix of Miami | (United States) Elliott Forbes-Robinson (Australia) Geoff Brabham | Nissan GTP ZX-T | Nissan Electramotive Engineering |
| 1988 | February 28 | Grand Prix of Miami | (United States) Price Cobb (United Kingdom) James Weaver | Porsche 962 | Dyson Racing |
| 1989 | March 5 | Nissan Grand Prix of Miami | (Australia) Geoff Brabham (United States) Chip Robinson | Nissan GTP ZX-T | Nissan Electromotive Engineering |
| 1990 | February 25 | Nissan Grand Prix of Miami | (Australia) Geoff Brabham (United States) Chip Robinson (United States) Bob Earl | Nissan GTP ZX-T | Nissan Electromotive Engineering |
| 1991 | April 7 | Nissan Camel Grand Prix of Miami | (Brazil) Raul Boesel | Jaguar XJR-10 | TWR |
| 1992 | February 22 | Toyota Grand Prix of Miami | (Australia) Geoff Brabham | Nissan NPT-91A | Nissan Performance Technologies |
| 1993 | February 21 | Toyota Grand Prix of Miami | (Argentina) Juan Manuel Fangio II | Eagle Mk III-Toyota | All American Racers |

- 1983: Race red-flagged after 27 laps due to heavy rain.

== Trans Am ==
For 1994, the event at Bicentennial Park switched to the SCCA Trans-Am Series. This event lasted only one year. In 1995, the CART series utilized the course for one race, then the course was partially razed for the construction of American Airlines Arena.

| Year | Date | Winning driver | Car | Team |
|---|---|---|---|---|
| 1994 | March 5 | (United States) Tommy Kendall | Ford Mustang | Roush Racing |

== American Le Mans Series ==
The ALMS and Champ Car held a joint race on a new circuit at Bayfront Park. The event took place in 2002 and 2003.

For 2002, a 1.387-mile (2.232 km) circuit utilized park roads and extended onto Biscayne Boulevard and 3rd and 4th Streets. In 2003, the layout was changed to drop the 3rd/4th Street loop and add a section on Biscayne Boulevard along the north end of the park.

| Year | Date | Race name | Winner(s) | Entrant | Car |
|---|---|---|---|---|---|
| 2002 | October 5 | Cadillac American Le Mans Challenge | (Germany) Frank Biela (Italy) Emanuele Pirro | Audi Sport North America | Audi R8 |
| 2003 | September 27 | Grand Prix Americas | (United Kingdom) Johnny Herbert (Finland) JJ Lehto | ADT Champion Racing | Audi R8 |

== Grand Am ==
The Rolex Sports Car Series held a race at Homestead-Miami Speedway in Homestead, Florida. The event was first held in 1998 as a part of the United States Road Racing Championship, but following the cancelation of that series the FIA GT Championship took over the 1999 event. Grand-Am revived the event in 2000. The race took place on the combined road course layout.

For 2002-2009, the race was held in conjunction with the Indycar race. In 2009, it moved to October and served as the Grand Am season finale. In 2010, the Indycar race was dropped, and the Grand Am race returned to the spring as a stand-alone event. It was not scheduled for 2013.

| Year | Date | Race name | Overall winner(s) | Team | Car |
|---|---|---|---|---|---|
| 1998 | May 17 | Road Racing Extravaganza | (United States) Butch Leitzinger (United Kingdom) James Weaver | Dyson Racing | Riley & Scott Mk III-Ford |
| 1999 | 26 September | Miami 500 | (France) Paul Belmondo (France) Emmanuel Clérico | Paul Belmondo Racing | Chrysler Viper GTS-R |
| 2000 | April 30 | Nextel 250 | (Italy) Mauro Baldi (Belgium) Didier Theys | Doran Lista Racing | Ferrari 333SP-Judd |
| 2001 | March 3 | Nextel 250 | (United States) Butch Leitzinger (United Kingdom) James Weaver | Dyson Racing | Riley & Scott Mk III-Ford |
| 2002 | March 2 | Nextel 250 | (Italy) Mauro Baldi (Belgium) Didier Theys | Doran Lista Racing | Ferrari 333SP-Judd |
| 2003 | March 1 | Nextel Grand Prix of Miami | (United States) J. C. France (United States) Hurley Haywood | Brumos Racing | Fabcar FDSC/03-Porsche |
| 2004 | February 28 | Grand Prix of Miami | (Venezuela) Milka Duno (United Kingdom) Andy Wallace | Howard Boss Motorsports | Crawford DP03-Pontiac |
| 2004 | September 19 | Miami 250 | (Venezuela) Milka Duno (United Kingdom) Andy Wallace | Howard Boss Motorsports | Crawford DP03-Pontiac |
| 2005 | March 5 | Grand Prix of Miami | (South Africa) Wayne Taylor (Italy) Max Angelelli | SunTrust Racing | Riley Mk XI-Pontiac |
| 2006 | March 25 | Linder-Komatsu Grand Prix of Miami | (Germany) Mike Rockenfeller (United States) Patrick Long | Alex Job Racing | Crawford DP03-Porsche |
| 2007 | March 24 | Linder-Komatsu Grand Prix of Miami | (United States) Bill Auberlen (United States) Matthew Alhadeff | Team Sigalsport | Riley Mk XI-BMW |
| 2008 | March 29 | Gainsco Grand Prix of Miami | (United States) Scott Pruett (Mexico) Memo Rojas | Chip Ganassi Racing | Riley Mk XI-Lexus |
| 2009 | October 10 | Gainsco Grand Prix of Miami | (Portugal) João Barbosa (United States) Hurley Haywood | Brumos Racing | Riley Mk XI-Porsche |
| 2010 | March 6 | Grand Prix of Miami | (United States) Scott Pruett (Mexico) Memo Rojas | Chip Ganassi Racing | Riley Mk XX-BMW |
| 2011 | March 5 | Grand Prix of Miami | (United States) Scott Pruett (Mexico) Memo Rojas | Chip Ganassi Racing | Riley Mk XX-BMW |
| 2012 | April 29 | Grand Prix of Miami | (Italy) Max Angelelli (United States) Ricky Taylor | SunTrust Racing | Corvette DP (Dallara DP01) |

- The 1998 race was a part of the United States Road Racing Championship. No race was held in 1999.

== See also ==
- Grand Prix of Miami (open wheel racing)
