= Derek Bell (racing driver) =

British racing driver (born 1941)

Derek Bell MBE
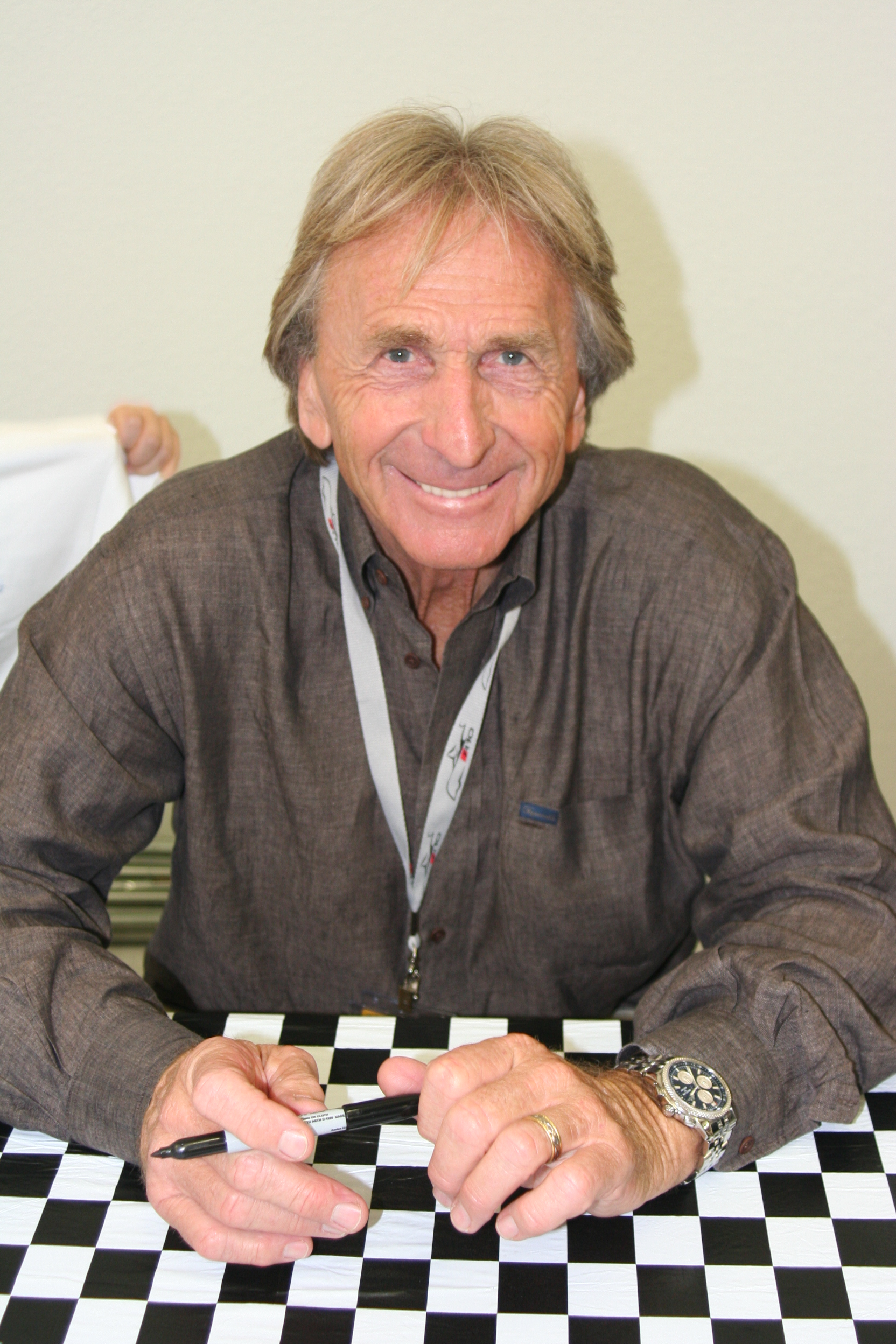
- Bell in 2008
- Born: Derek Reginald Bell; 31 October 1941 (age 85); Pinner, Middlesex, England, UK
- Relatives: Justin Bell (son); Oliver Bell (grandson)

Formula One World Championship career
- Nationality: (United Kingdom) British
- Active years: 1968–1972, 1974
- Team(s): Ferrari, McLaren, Surtees, Tecno
- Entries: 16 (9 starts)
- Championships: 0
- Wins: 0
- Podiums: 0
- Career points: 1
- Pole positions: 0
- Fastest laps: 0
- First entry: 1968 Italian Grand Prix
- Last entry: 1974 Canadian Grand Prix

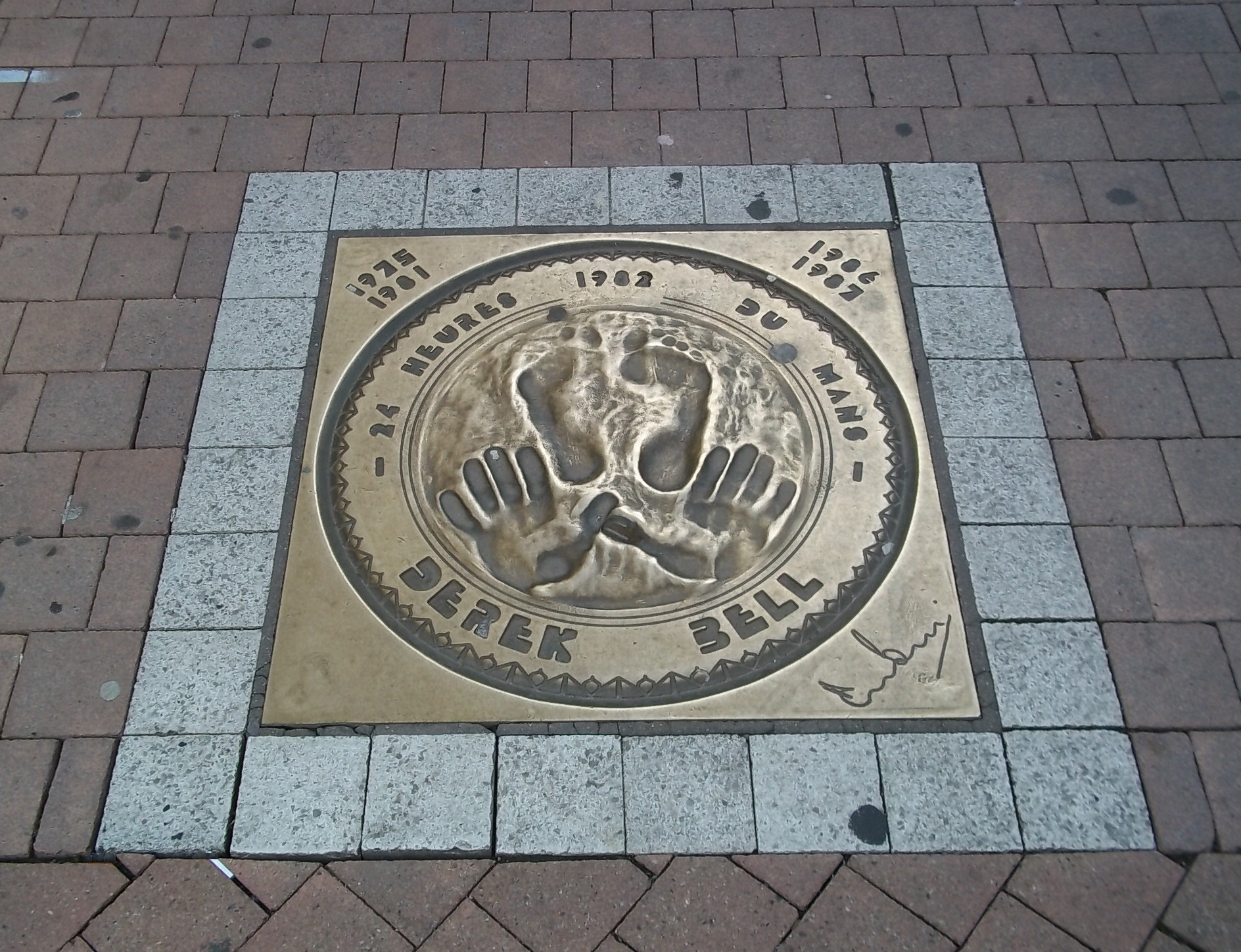
Derek Bell in the Walk of fame at Le Mans

Derek Reginald Bell MBE (born 31 October 1941) is a British racing driver. In sportscar racing, he won the Le Mans 24 hours five times, the Daytona 24 three times and the World Sportscar Championship twice. He also raced in Formula One for the Ferrari, Wheatcroft, McLaren, Surtees and Tecno teams. He has been described by fellow racer Hans-Joachim Stuck as one of the most liked drivers of his generation.

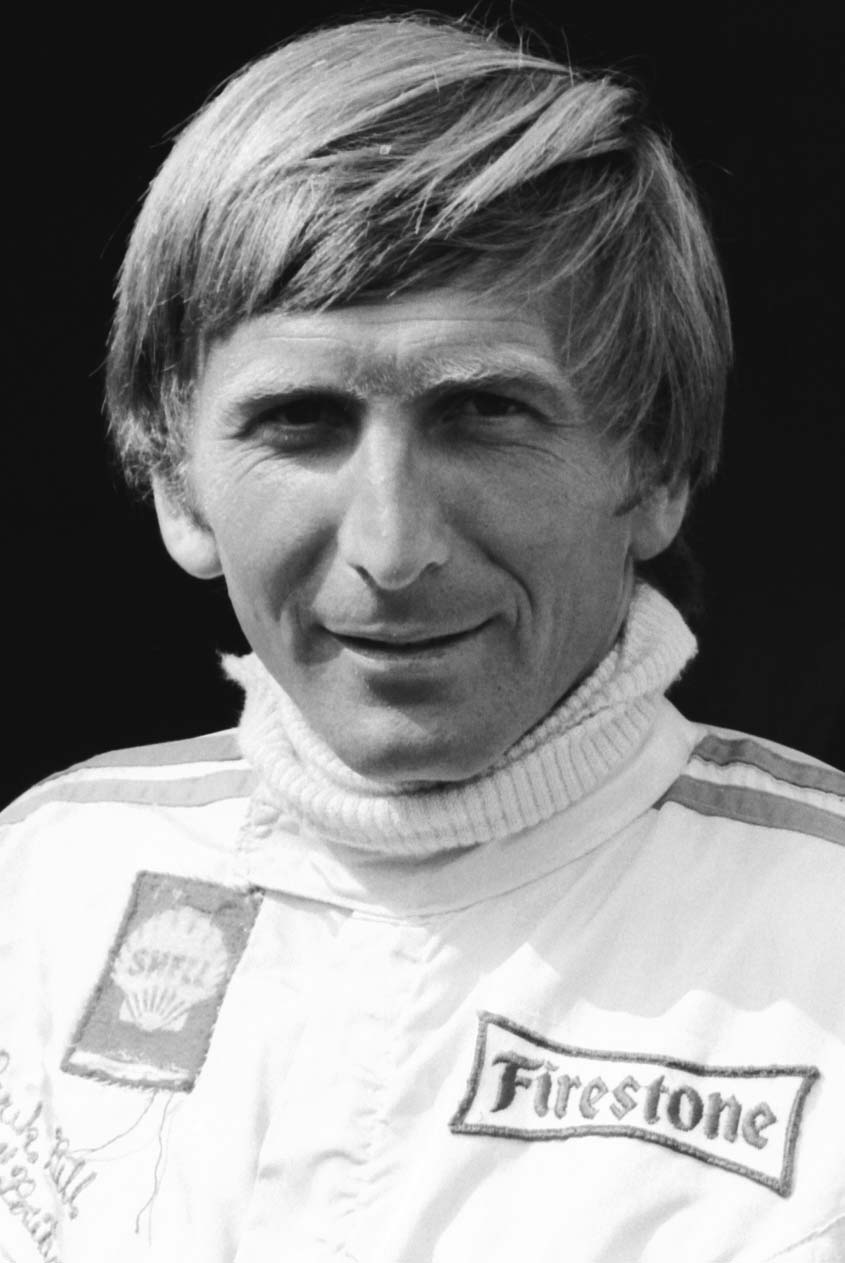
Derek Bell at the Nürburgring in August 1970 when racing Formula 2

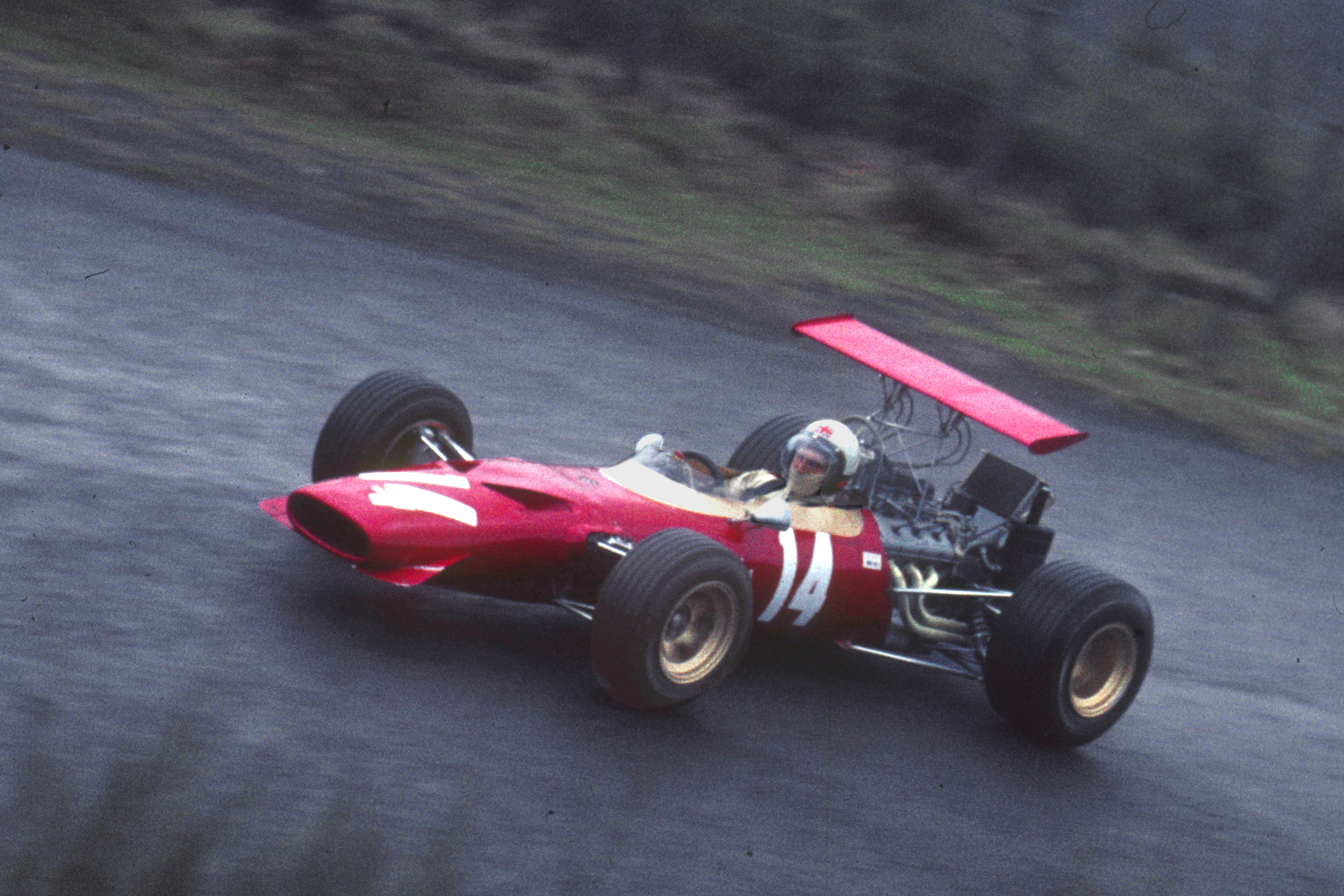
Derek Bell racing a Formula 2 Dino 166 at the Nürburgring in 1969

== Early career ==
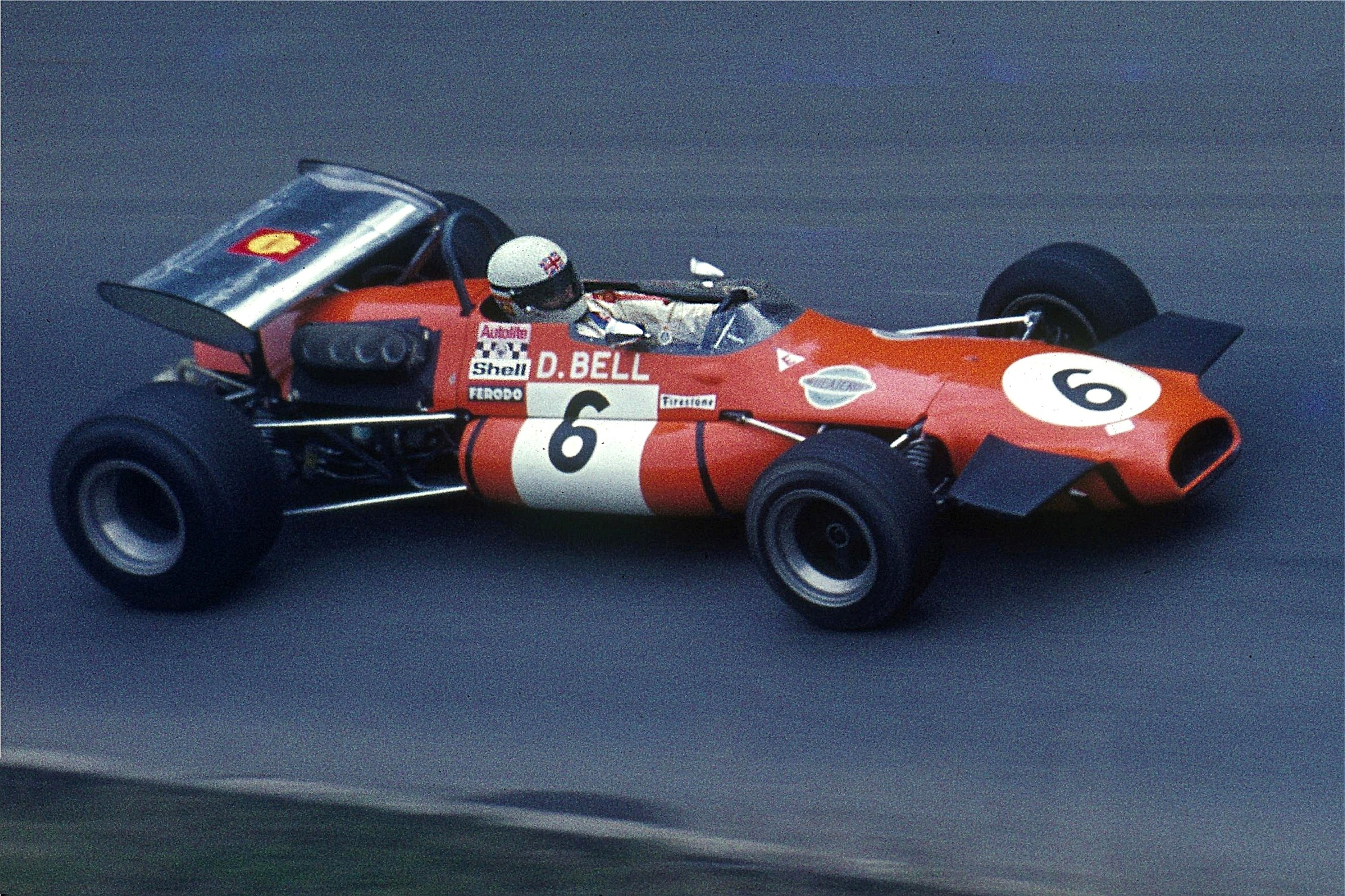
Derek Bell in the Wheatcroft Racing Brabham BT30 at the Nürburgring in 1970

Bell grew up on a farm and helped to run the Church Farm caravan site, complete with its own pub, near Pagham Harbour, boarding at The King's School, Worcester. He was encouraged by his stepfather Bernard Hender to take up racing with a Lotus Seven in 1964. He won his first race in the Lotus at Goodwood in March of that year. He graduated to Formula Three in the following year, racing a Lotus 31, and in 1966, switched to a Lotus 41 scoring his first victory, again at Goodwood. In 1967, he enjoyed seven wins. He entered Formula Two in a privateer Brabham BT23C fielded by his stepfather's Church Farm Racing team and after several promising performances, which caught Enzo Ferrari's eye, made his Formula One Grand Prix debut for Ferrari at Monza in 1968. He contested the 1969 Tasman Series in a 2.4 Dino and was second at Lakeside to Amon and Rindt at Warwick Farm. In 1969, he raced the four-wheel-drive McLaren M9A in its only ever race at the British Grand Prix at Silverstone.

Bell took part in the filming of Le Mans (1970) starring Steve McQueen, and he and his family lived with the McQueen family during the filming, the two becoming friends. Bell had a lucky escape during the making of the film. The Ferrari 512 he was driving suddenly caught fire whilst getting into position for a take. He managed to get out of the car just before it was engulfed in flames and suffered minor burns. Although the car was badly damaged, it was later rebuilt and is still racing at historic meets.

Bell finished second in the 1970 European Formula Two Championship, driving a Brabham BT30 for Wheatcroft Racing. In 1972, he got a drive in the Tecno Formula One team, along with Nanni Galli. He later raced a number of times for the Surtees team, including a sixth place at the 1970 United States Grand Prix racing a Surtees TS7, which was to be his highest finish in the Formula One World Championship. He had a few further drives for Surtees in 1974 and finished 11th in the 1974 German Grand Prix. Enjoying single seaters more than sports cars he accepted drives in F5000/Libre British Shellsport series and F5000 in 1976-7 the Penske PC7 March and also odd F5000 drives in the US and Australia.

It was to be in sports car racing, which Bell came to via a drive in Jacques Swaters privately entered Ferrari 512M in the 1970 Spa 1000 km, leading to a Ferrari works drive at the 1970 Le Mans 24 hours, where he built a strong reputation as a world class and world championship winning racer.

24 Hours of Le Mans career
- Years: 1970–1983, 1985–1996
- Teams: Scuderia Ferrari; John Wyer Automotive; Ecurie Francorchamps; Gulf Racing; Grand Touring Cars; Renault Sport; Porsche System; Rothmans Porsche; Richard Lloyd Racing; Joest Porsche Racing; ADA Engineering; Courage Compétition; Gulf Oil Racing; David Price Racing
- Best finish: 1st (1975, 1981, 1982, 1986, 1987)
- Class wins: 5 (1975, 1981, 1982, 1986, 1987)

== Le Mans ==
Bell won the Le Mans 24 hours race five times, in 1975, 1981, 1982, 1986 and 1987, making him the most successful British driver in the race to date. He was teamed with the Belgian Jacky Ickx in 1975, racing the Gulf Mirage GR8, again in 1981, racing a Porsche 936, and finally in 1982 racing a Rothmans Porsche 956. Bell went on to win the 1986 and 1987 Le Mans teamed with Hans-Joachim Stuck and Al Holbert racing a Rothmans Porsche 962.

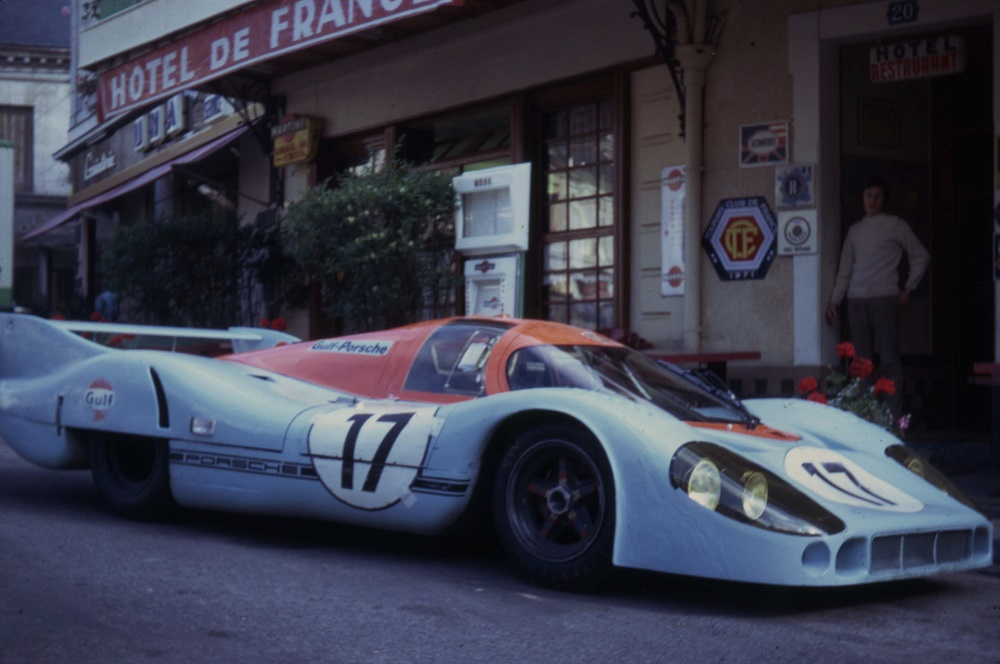
1971 Le Mans Porsche 917LH driven by Derek Bell and Jo Siffert parked outside the Hotel de France

Bell's first Le Mans was in 1970 in a works-entered Ferrari 512, with co-driver Ronnie Peterson, his last in 1996 racing a McLaren F1 GTR. Bell achieved his highest ever speed at Le Mans at the 1971 Le Mans 24 hours April test day, reaching a calculated top speed of 246 mph on the Mulsanne Straight in the JW Gulf Porsche 917LH.

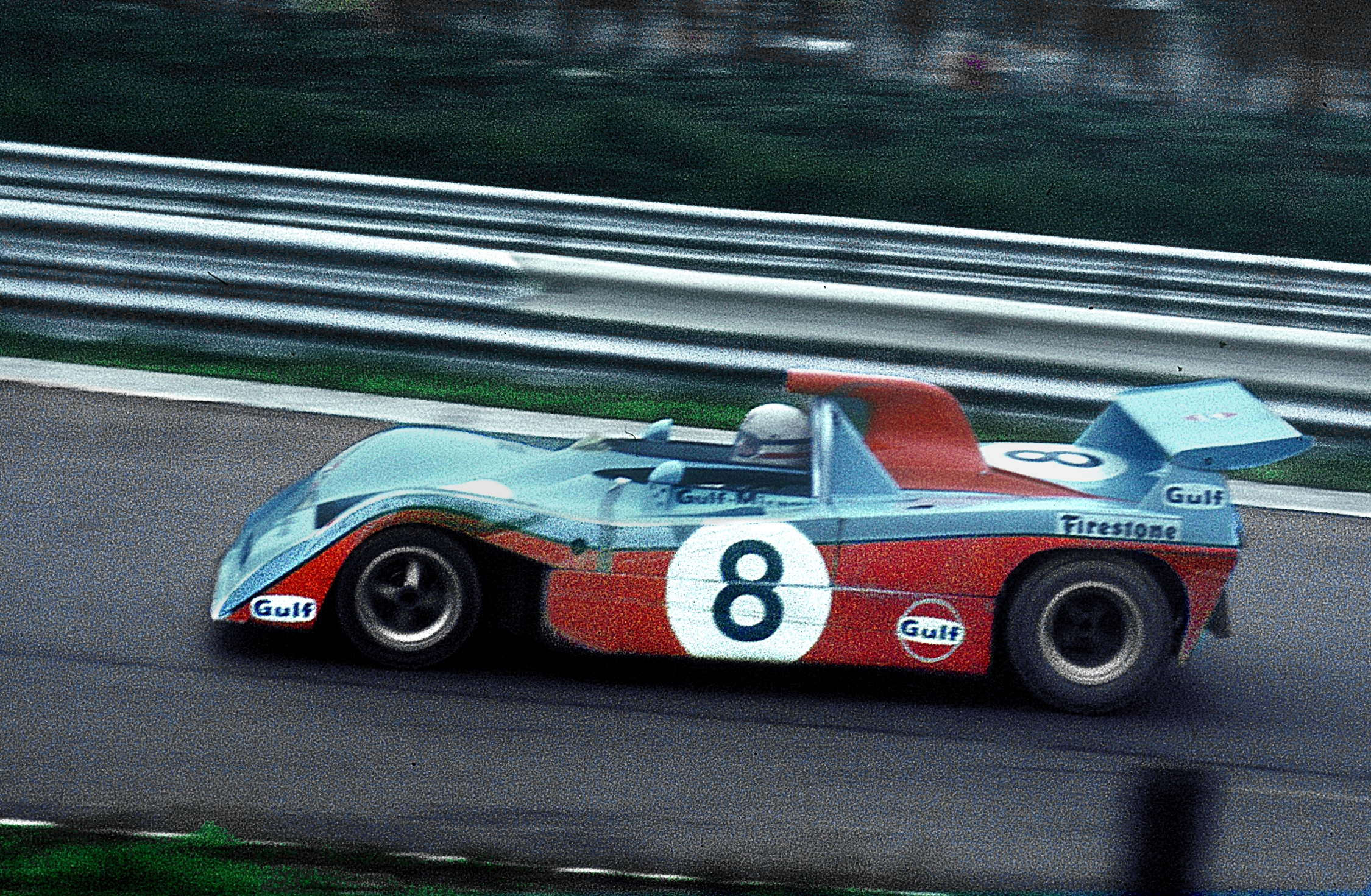
Derek Bell in the Gulf Mirage M6 at the 1972 Nürburgring 1000km

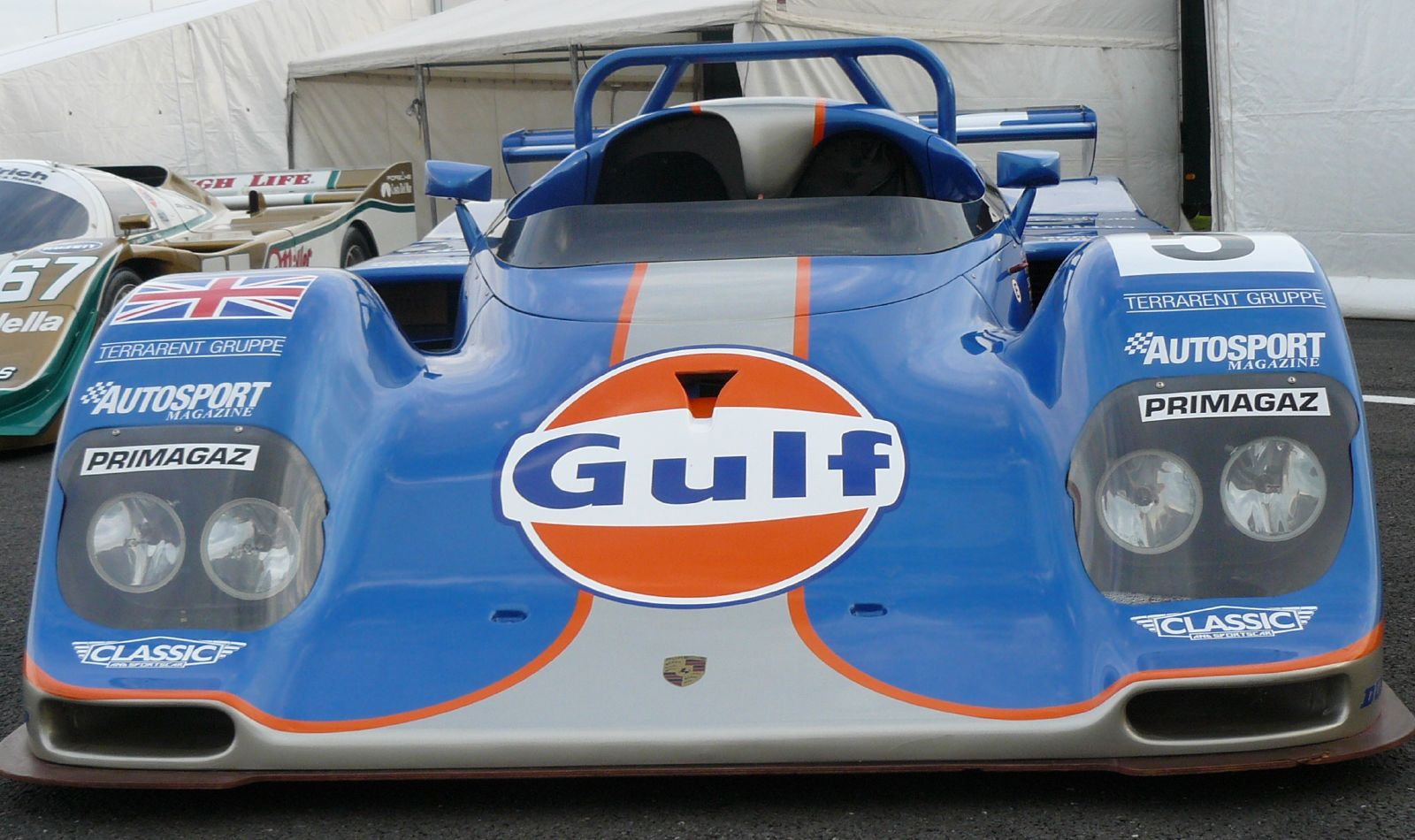
1994 Le Mans Gulf Kremer Porsche K8 Spyder raced by Derek Bell and Robin Donovan

== Sportscar racing ==
Bell also won the World Sportscar Championship title twice in 1985 and 1986 and the 24 Hours of Daytona three times in 1986, 1987 and 1989. He won the 1973 Silverstone RAC Tourist Trophy racing a BMW 3.0CSL with Harald Ertl. In 1984 he won the Nürburgring 1000km with Stefan Bellof, racing a Porsche 956, with a notable fourth place in the 1974 Nürburgring 1000km racing a Gulf GR7 with James Hunt on the longer 22.8 km circuit.

Bell's first victory in the Spa 1000km came in 1974 racing a Mirage M6 with Mike Hailwood, going onto win the 1975 and 1984 editions, with Henri Pescarolo, in 1975, in that season's dominant Alfa Romeo Tipo 33TT12 on the old 14 km track and with Stefan Bellof, in the equally dominant Porsche 956 of 1984, on the shorter circuit used by Formula One. He is also one of two drivers to win the Spa 1000km on both the original and current circuits, the other being Jacky Ickx.

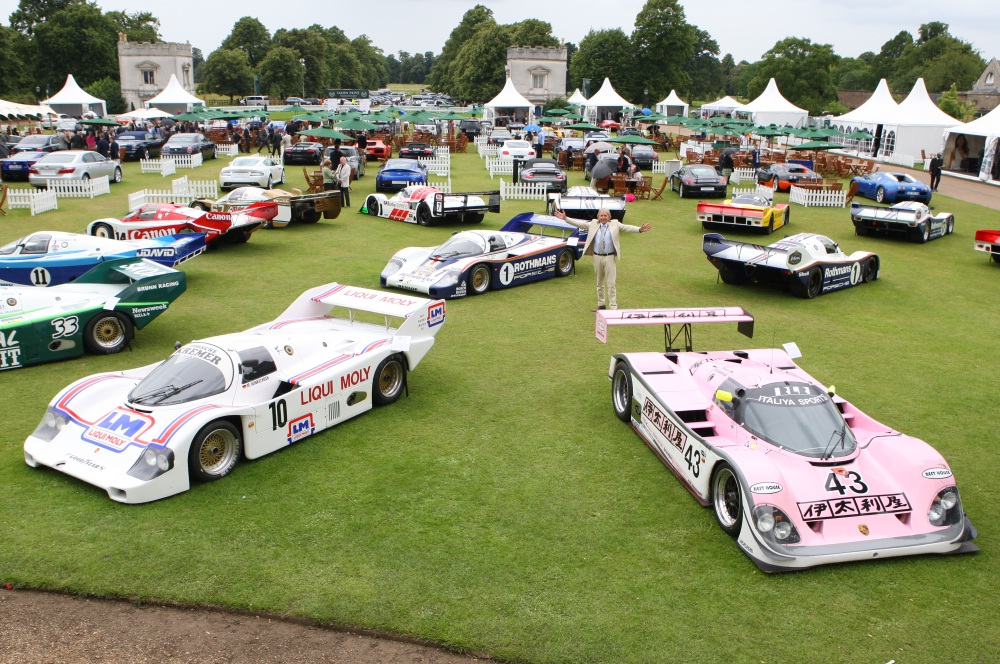
Derek Bell with a number of the Porsche 956s and 962s he drove during his racing career

== Post-racing career ==
Bell was hired as chairman for the Spectre R42 super car project between 1996 and its demise in 1997. In 2001, he was hired to consult for the Bentley Speed 8 programme, helping Bentley to win Le Mans two years later. He now splits his time between the United States and his home near Chichester, UK, with his wife Misti. He is an after dinner speaker and motorsport commentator, and also races in historic events, and is a global ambassador for Bentley. Bell is also an operating partner of Bentley Naples in Naples, Florida.

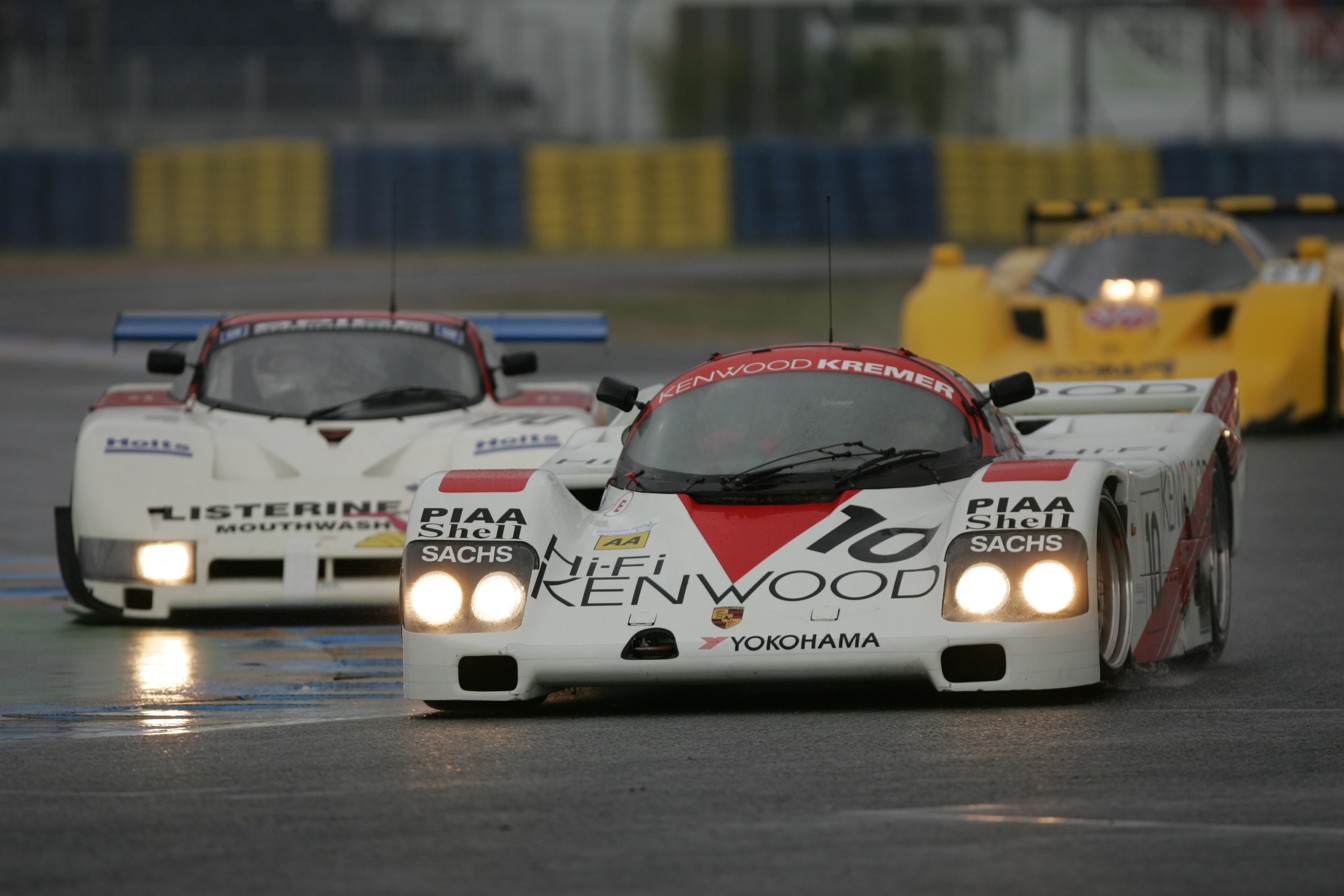
Derek Bell racing in the Group C support race at the 2012 Le Mans

Bell's eldest son Justin is also a racer. The two raced together in the 1991 24 Hours of Daytona, and the 1992 24 Hours of Le Mans. Bell was to race in the 2008 24 Hours of Daytona with Justin, however the car dropped out of the race early and Derek did not get to run in the race. Aside from winning at Le Mans five times, he claims his proudest moment was coming third with his son Justin racing the Harrods sponsored McLaren F1 GTR in the 1995 Le Mans on Fathers Day.

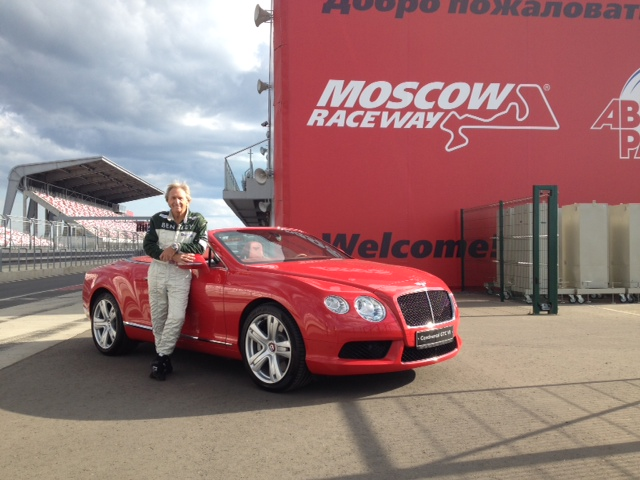
Bentley Brand ambassador Derek Bell at the Moscow Raceway

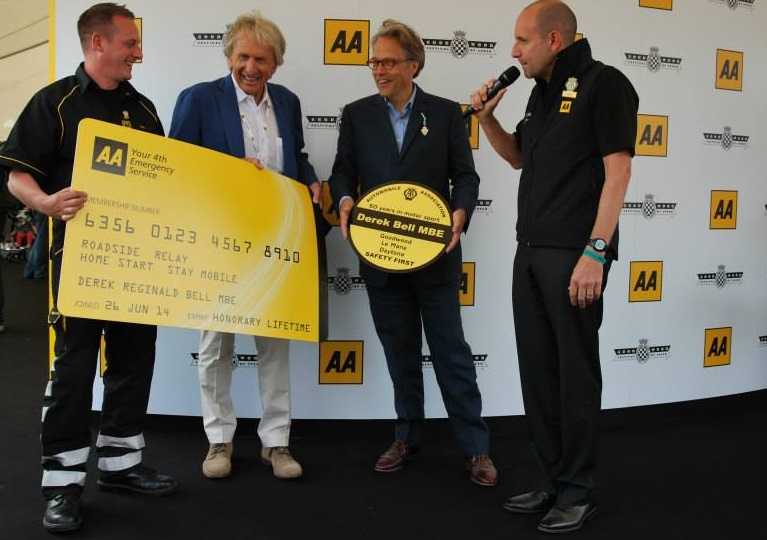
AA presentation of Honorary Life membership to Derek Bell

Bell is a patron for the charities Dementia Support, Hope for Tomorrow, Mission Motorsport and the Henry Surtees Foundation. He is also an ambassador for the Fly Navy Heritage Trust.

Bell is currently the president of the oldest pram race in the world. The Pagham Pram Race started in 1946 and is run annually at 11am on Boxing Day.

Bell returned to Le Mans to race a Porsche 962 for the first time in 20 years in the Group C support race at Le Mans on 16 June 2012.

Bell was presented with Honorary Life membership of the AA in recognition of his 50 years in motorsport, commemorated by a plaque presented by Lord March at the Moving Motorshow during the 2014 Goodwood Festival of Speed in the presence of Chris Jansen, CEO of the AA, and Edmund King, the president of the AA.

Bell was the grand marshal at the 2014 Silverstone 6 Hours, 2010 Twelve Hours of Sebring and 2021 24 hours of Le Mans.

== Awards ==
- BRDC Gold Star: 1984, 1985, 1986 and 1987
- Royal Automobile Club Plaque d'Honneur: 1985
- Guild of Motoring Writers Driver of the Year: 1982 and 1985
- Bell was awarded the MBE in 1986 for services to motorsport.
- Inducted into the Motorsports Hall of Fame of America in 2012.
- Inducted into the Le Mans 24 Hours Drivers Hall of Fame in 2013.
- Inducted in to the Motor Sport Hall of Fame UK in 2016
- Presented with Honorary Life Membership of the AA in recognition of his 50 years in motorsport at the 2014 Goodwood Festival of Speed
- was made citizen of honor of the city of Angoulême in 2017
- 2017 Simeone Foundation Spirit of Competition Award

== Racing record ==
=== Career summary ===
Season	Series	Team	Races	Wins	Poles	F/Laps	Podiums	Points	Position
1966	British Formula Three	N/A	2	1	0	1	1	9	12th
1967	British Formula Three	Felday Engineering	?	?	?	?	?	30	7th
1968	European Formula Two	Scuderia Ferrari	5	0	1	0	1	15	4th
1968	European Formula Two	Church Farm Racing Team	3	0	0	0	0	15	4th
1968	European Formula Two	Frank Williams Racing Cars	1	0	0	0	1	15	4th
1968	Formula One	Scuderia Ferrari	2	0	0	0	0	0	NC
1969	Tasman Series	Scuderia Veloce	7	0	0	0	2	21	4th
1969	European Formula Two	Scuderia Ferrari	3	0	0	0	0	11	5th
1969	European Formula Two	Frank Williams Racing Cars	1	0	0	0	0	11	5th
1969	Formula One	Bruce McLaren Motor Racing	1	0	0	0	0	0	NC
1969	European Formula 5000 Championship	Team Surtees	1	0	0	0	0	55	46th
1970	European Formula Two	Team Wheatcroft Racing	8	1	0	1	4	35	**2nd**
1970	Tasman Series	Team Wheatcroft Racing	3	0	0	0	1	6	10th
1970	World Sportscar Championship	Scuderia Ferrari	3	0	0	0	0	0	NC
1970	Formula One	Team Wheatcroft Racing	1	0	0	0	0	1	22nd
1970	Formula One	Team Surtees	1	0	0	0	0	1	22nd
1970	European Formula 5000 Championship	Sid Taylor Racing	1	0	1	1	0	0	NC
1971	European Formula Two	Frank Williams Racing Cars	5	0	1	0	1	6	13th
1971	European Formula 5000 Championship	Sid Taylor Racing	2	0	0	0	0	0	NC
1971	Formula One	Team Surtees	1	0	0	0	0	0	NC
1971	Can-Am	J.W. Automotive	1	0	0	0	0	0	NC
1971	24 Hours of Le Mans	J.W. Automotive	1	0	0	0	0	N/A	DNF
1972	SCCA Continental Championship	Sid Taylor Racing	4	0	0	0	2	15	14th
1972	Formula One	Martini Racing Team	2	0	0	0	0	0	NC
1972	24 Hours of Le Mans	Ecurie Francorchamps	1	0	0	0	0	N/A	8th
1973	European Formula Two	Team Surtees	4	0	1	0	1	13	8th
1973	British Saloon Car Championship	Alpina	1	1	0	0	1	9	20th
1973	European Touring Car Championship	Alpina	1	1	0	0	1	0	NC
1973	Can-Am	Motschenbacher Racing	1	0	0	0	0	10	16th
1973	24 Hours of Le Mans	Gulf Research Racing	1	0	0	0	0	N/A	DNF
1974	Formula One	Bang & Olufsen Team Surtees	1	0	0	0	0	0	NC
1974	European Formula Two	Bang & Olufsen Team Surtees	1	0	0	0	0	0	NC
1974	European Formula 5000 Championship	Hogan Racing	1	0	1	1	0	10	23rd
1974	Deutsche Rennsport Meisterschaft	BMW Motorsport	1	0	0	0	0	0	NC
1974	24 Hours of Le Mans	Gulf Research Racing	1	0	0	0	0	N/A	4th
1975	Interserie	Willi Kauhsen Racing Team	4	1	1	1	1	64	4th
1975	European Formula 5000 Championship	RAM Racing	1	0	0	0	0	0	NC
1975	24 Hours of Le Mans	Gulf Research Racing	1	1	1	0	1	N/A	**1st**
1976	Shellsport International Series	Hexagon Racing	2	0	0	1	1	27	11th
1976	British Saloon Car Championship	British Leyland	1	0	0	0	0	9	?
1976	SCCA Continental Championship		1	0	0	0	0	0	NC
1976	24 Hours of Le Mans	Grand Touring Cars Inc.	1	0	0	0	0	N/A	5th
1977	Shellsport International Series	Hexagon Racing	5	1	0	1	1	42	11th
1977	Interserie	Willi Kauhsen Racing Team	1	1	1	1	1	20	17th
1977	24 Hours of Le Mans	Renault Sport	1	0	0	0	0	N/A	DNF
1978	British Saloon Car Championship	Hexagon Racing	1	0	0	0	0	6	30th
1978	Rothmans International Series	Porsche Car Distributors	1	0	0	0	0	0	NC
1978	24 Hours of Le Mans	Renault Sport	1	0	0	0	0	N/A	DNF
1979	24 Hours of Le Mans	Grand Touring Cars Inc.	1	0	0	0	0	N/A	DNF
1980	24 Hours of Le Mans	Porsche System	1	0	0	0	0	N/A	13th
1981	World Sportscar Championship	Porsche System	10	1	0	0	4	96	7th
1981	24 Hours of Le Mans	Porsche System	1	1	0	0	1	N/A	**1st**
1982	World Sportscar Championship	Rothmans Porsche System	5	2	0	0	4	70	**3rd**
1982	24 Hours of Le Mans	Rothmans Porsche System	1	1	0	0	1	N/A	**1st**
1982	IMSA GT Championship	Bob Akin Motor Racing	8	0	0	0	2	61	9th
1983	World Sportscar Championship	Rothmans Porsche System	7	3	0	0	5	94	**2nd**
1983	European Endurance Championship	Rothmans Porsche System	3	0	0	0	2	88	**2nd**
1983	All-Japan Sports Prototype Championship	Rothmans Porsche System	1	1	1	1	1	20	4th
1983	24 Hours of Le Mans	Rothmans Porsche System	1	0	0	0	1	N/A	**2nd**
1984	IMSA GT Championship	Holbert Racing	13	5	2	3	9	164	**3rd**
1984	World Sportscar Championship	Rothmans Porsche	6	4	0	0	4	91	4th
1984	International Race of Champions		4	0	0	?	1	35	6th
1984	European Formula Two	Onyx Race Engineering	1	0	0	0	0	0	NC
1985	IMSA GT Championship	Holbert Racing	11	6	0	1	8	154	**2nd**
1985	World Sportscar Championship	Rothmans Porsche	9	3	0	0	7	117	**1st**
1985	24 Hours of Le Mans	Rothmans Porsche	1	0	1	0	1	N/A	**3rd**
1985	International Race of Champions		3	0	0	?	0	31	6th
1986	IMSA GT Championship	Holbert Racing	14	3	0	1	7	154	**3rd**
1986	World Sportscar Championship	Rothmans Porsche	7	2	0	0	5	82	**1st**
1986	World Sportscar Championship	Joest Racing	7	2	0	0	5	82	**1st**
1986	World Sportscar Championship	John Fitzpatrick Racing	7	2	0	0	5	82	**1st**
1986	24 Hours of Le Mans	Rothmans Porsche	1	1	1	0	1	N/A	**1st**
1986	24 Hours of Daytona	Holbert Racing	1	1	?	?	1	N/A	**1st**
1987	World Sportscar Championship	Porsche AG	10	1	0	0	5	99	5th
1987	World Sportscar Championship	Joest Racing	10	1	0	0	5	99	5th
1987	World Sportscar Championship	Rothmans Porsche Team Schuppan	10	1	0	0	5	99	5th
1987	IMSA GT Championship	Holbert Racing	8	2	0	0	3	93	6th
1987	International Race of Champions		4	0	0	0	0	27	12th
1987	All-Japan Sports Prototype Championship	Rothmans Porsche Team Schuppan	1	0	0	0	0	6	39th
1987	24 Hours of Le Mans	Rothmans Porsche	1	1	0	0	1	N/A	**1st**
1987	24 Hours of Daytona	Holbert Racing	1	1	?	0	1	N/A	**1st**
1987	World Rally Championship	GM Euro Sport	1	0	0	0	0	0	NC
1988	World Sportscar Championship	Richard Lloyd Racing	5	0	0	0	1	20	37th
1988	World Sportscar Championship	Porsche AG	5	0	0	0	1	20	37th
1988	World Sportscar Championship	Takefuji Schuppan Racing Team	5	0	0	0	1	20	37th
1988	IMSA GT Championship	Holbert Racing	9	0	0	0	3	73	11th
1988	24 Hours of Le Mans	Porsche AG	1	0	1	1	1	N/A	**2nd**
1988	World Rally Championship	GM Dealer Sport	1	0	0	0	0	0	NC
1989	World Sportscar Championship	Richard Lloyd Racing	6	0	0	0	0	18	22nd
1989	IMSA GT Championship	Miller-BF Goodrich	6	1	0	0	1	34	20th
1989	24 Hours of Le Mans	Richard Lloyd Racing	1	0	0	0	0	N/A	DNF
1989	24 Hours of Daytona	Miller-BF Goodrich	1	1	0	0	1	N/A	**1st**
1990	IMSA GT Championship	Momo-Gebhardt Racing	6	0	0	0	0	20	29th
1990	All-Japan Sports Prototype Championship	Alpha Nova Racing	4	0	0	0	0	8	24th
1990	World Sportscar Championship	Equipe Alméras Frères	2	0	0	0	0	0	NC
1990	World Sportscar Championship	Konrad Motorsport	2	0	0	0	0	0	NC
1990	World Sportscar Championship	Joest Porsche Racing	2	0	0	0	0	0	NC
1990	24 Hours of Le Mans	Joest Porsche Racing	1	0	0	0	0	N/A	4th
1991	IMSA GT Championship	Nissan Performance Technology	5	0	0	0	1	24	24th
1991	IMSA GT Championship	Momo-Gebhardt Racing	5	0	0	0	1	24	24th
1991	World Sportscar Championship	Konrad Motorsport	2	0	0	0	0	8	38th
1991	World Sportscar Championship	Team Salamin Primagaz	2	0	0	0	0	8	38th
1991	24 Hours of Le Mans	Konrad Motorsport	1	0	0	0	0	N/A	7th
1991	24 Hours of Le Mans	Joest Porsche Racing	1	0	0	0	0	N/A	7th
1993	IMSA GT Championship		11	0	0	0	3	88	4th
1993	24 Hours of Le Mans	Courage Compétition	1	0	0	0	0	N/A	10th
1994	IMSA GT Championship	Auto Toy Store	2	1	0	0	1	27	28th
1994	24 Hours of Le Mans	Gulf Oil Racing	1	0	0	0	0	N/A	6th
1995	IMSA GT Championship	Auto Toy Store	2	0	0	0	1	0	NC
1995	24 Hours of Le Mans	Harrods Mach One Racing	1	0	0	0	1	N/A	**3rd**
1996	IMSA GT Championship		?	?	?	?	?	22	23rd
1996	BPR Global GT Series	Freisinger Motorsport	1	0	0	0	0	0	NC
1996	24 Hours of Le Mans	Harrods Mach One Racing	1	0	0	0	0	N/A	6th
1997	IMSA GT Championship	Moretti Racing	1	0	0	0	0	0	NC
1998	IMSA GT Championship	Matthews-Colucci Racing	1	0	0	0	0	1	46th
1999	United States Road Racing Championship	Matthews-Colucci Racing	1	0	0	0	0	28	38th
1999	SpeedVision World Challenge - GT	Speedvision/Vortech	1	0	0	0	0	0	NC
2000	SpeedVision World Challenge - GT	Champion Audi Racing	10	0	0	0	0	121	12th
2000	Rolex Sports Car Series	EMKA Racing	1	0	0	0	0	0	NC
2001	SpeedVision World Challenge - GT	Legends of Motorsport	9	0	0	0	2	142	11th
2002	Speed World Challenge - GT	Champion Audi Racing	10	0	0	0	0	174	7th
2003	Rolex Sports Car Series	Derhaag Motorsports	1	0	0	0	0	21	68th
2004	Speed World Challenge - GT	Volvo Cars North America	3	0	0	0	0	5	50th
2005	Speed World Challenge - GT		5	0	0	0	0	30	34th
2008	Rolex Sports Car Series	RVO Motorsports	1	0	0	0	0	0	NC
2010	Volkswagen Scirocco R-Cup		1	0	0	0	0	0	NC†

^{†} As Bell was a guest driver, he was ineligible for championship points.

=== Complete European Formula Two Championship results ===
(key) (Races in bold indicate pole position; races in italics indicate fastest lap)

Year	Entrant	Chassis	Engine	1	2	3	4	5	6	7	8	9	10	11	12	13	14	15	16	17	Pos.	Pts
1968	Frank Williams Racing Cars	Brabham BT23C	Ford	HOC; Ret																	4th	15
1968	Church Farm Racing Team	Brabham BT23C	Ford		THR; 3	JAR; Ret	PAL; Ret														4th	15
1968	Scuderia Ferrari	Ferrari 166	Ferrari					TUL; 7	**ZAN**; 14	PER; 5	HOC; 3	VLL; 6									4th	15
1969	Scuderia Ferrari	Ferrari 166	Ferrari	THR; Ret	HOC	NÜR; 5	JAR; 8	TUL	PER												5th	11
1969	Frank Williams Racing Cars	Brabham BT30	Ford							VLL; 4											5th	11
1970	Team Wheatcroft Racing	Brabham BT30	Ford	THR; 3	HOC; 3	BAR; 1	ROU; 7	PER; 7	TUL; 4	IMO; 3	HOC; 6										2nd	35
1971	Frank Williams Racing Cars	March 712M	Ford	HOC	THR; 3	**NÜR**; Ret	JAR	PAL; 8	ROU	MAN; 8	TUL	ALB; DNQ	VLL; Ret	VLL							13th	6
1973	Team Surtees	Surtees TS15	Ford	MAL	HOC; 3	THR	NÜR; 4	PAU	KIN	NIV	HOC; Ret	ROU	MNZ; 4	MAN	KAR	PER	SAL	NOR	ALB	VLL	8th	13
1974	Bang & Olufsen Team Surtees	Surtees TS15A	BMW	BAR	HOC	PAU	SAL	HOC; Ret	MUG	KAR	PER	HOC	VLL								NC	0
1984	Onyx Race Engineering	March 842	BMW	SIL	HOC	THR	VLL	MUG	PAU	HOC	MIS	PER	DON	BRH; 9							NC	0

=== Complete Formula One World Championship results ===
(key)

Year	Entrant	Chassis	Engine	1	2	3	4	5	6	7	8	9	10	11	12	13	14	15	WDC	Pts
1968	Scuderia Ferrari SpA SEFAC	Ferrari 312/68	Ferrari 242C 3.0 V12	RSA	ESP	MON	BEL	NED	FRA	GBR	GER	ITA; Ret	CAN						NC	0
1968	Scuderia Ferrari SpA SEFAC	Ferrari 312/67/68	Ferrari 242 3.0 V12											USA; Ret	MEX				NC	0
1969	Bruce McLaren Motor Racing	McLaren M9A	Ford Cosworth DFV 3.0 V8	RSA	ESP	MON	NED	FRA	GBR; Ret	GER	ITA	CAN	USA	MEX					NC	0
1970	Tom Wheatcroft Racing	Brabham BT26A	Ford Cosworth DFV 3.0 V8	RSA	ESP	MON	BEL; Ret	NED	FRA	GBR	GER	AUT	ITA	CAN					22nd	1
1970	Team Surtees	Surtees TS7	Ford Cosworth DFV 3.0 V8												USA; 6	MEX			22nd	1
1971	Team Surtees	Surtees TS9	Ford Cosworth DFV 3.0 V8	RSA	ESP	MON	NED	FRA	GBR; Ret	GER	AUT	ITA	CAN	USA					NC	0
1972	Martini Racing Team	Tecno PA123	Tecno Series-P 3.0 F12	ARG	RSA	ESP	MON	BEL	FRA; DNS	GBR	GER; Ret	AUT	ITA; DNQ	CAN; DNS	USA; Ret				NC	0
1974	Bang & Olufsen Team Surtees	Surtees TS16	Ford Cosworth DFV 3.0 V8	ARG	BRA	RSA	ESP	BEL	MON	SWE	NED	FRA	GBR; DNQ	GER; 11					NC	0
1974	Team Surtees	Surtees TS16	Ford Cosworth DFV 3.0 V8												AUT; DNQ	ITA; DNQ	CAN; DNQ	USA	NC	0

=== Complete Formula One Non-Championship results ===
(key)

Year	Entrant	Chassis	Engine	1	2	3	4	5	6	7	8
1968	Scuderia Ferrari SpA SEFAC	Ferrari 312/67/68	Ferrari 242 3.0 V12	ROC	INT	OUL; Ret					
1969	Scuderia Ferrari SpA SEFAC	Ferrari 312/68	Ferrari 255C 3.0 V12	ROC	INT; 9	MAD	OUL				
1970	Tom Wheatcroft Racing	Brabham BT26A	Ford Cosworth DFV 3.0 V8	ROC; DNS	INT	OUL					
1971	Tom Wheatcroft Racing	March 701	Ford Cosworth DFV 3.0 V8	ARG; Ret	ROC						
1971	Frank Williams Racing Cars	March 701	Ford Cosworth DFV 3.0 V8			QUE; 15	SPR	INT	RIN	OUL	VIC

=== Complete Tasman Series results ===
(key)

Year	Team	Chassis	Engine	1	2	3	4	5	6	7	Pos.	Pts
1969	Scuderia Veloce	Dino 246 Tasmania	Ferrari 2.4 V6	PUK; 4	LEV; Ret	WIG; 5	TER; 5	LAK; 2	WAR; 2	SAN; 5	4th	21
1970	Wheatcroft Racing	Brabham BT26A	Ford Cosworth DFW 2.5 V8	LEV; 9	PUK; 2	WIG; Ret	TER	SUR	WAR	SAN	10th	6

=== Complete Formula 5000 Championship/British Formula One Championship results ===
(key) (Races in bold indicate pole position; races in italics indicate fastest lap.)

Year	Entrant	Chassis	Engine	1	2	3	4	5	6	7	8	9	10	11	12	13	14	15	16	17	18	19	20	Pos.	Pts
1969	Team Surtees	Surtees TS5A	Chevrolet 5.0 V8	OUL	BRH	BRH	MAL	SIL	MON	KOK	ZAN; 14	SNE	HOC	OUL	BRH									46th	55
1970	Sid Taylor Racing	McLaren M10B	Chevrolet 5.0 V8	OUL	BRH	ZOL	ZAN	SIL	BRH	CAS	MAL	MON	SIL	**MNZ**; Ret	AND	SAL	THR	SIL	OUL	SNE	HOC	OUL	BRH	NC	0
1971	Sid Taylor Racing	McLaren M18	Chevrolet 5.0 V8	MAL	SNE	BRH	MON	SIL	CAS	MAL	MNZ; Ret	MAL	THR	SIL	OUL	SNE	HOC	OUL; Ret	BRH	BRH				NC	0
1974	Hogan Racing	Lola T330	Chevrolet 5.0 V8	BRH	MAL	SIL	OUL	BRH	ZOL	**THR**; 4	ZAN	MUG	MNZ	MAL	MON	THR	BRH	OUL	SNE	MAL	BRH			23rd	10
1975	RAM Racing	Chevron B28	Chevrolet 5.0 V8	BRH	OUL	BRH	SIL	ZOL	ZAN	THR; Ret	SNE	MAL	THR	BRH	OUL	SIL	SNE	MAL	BRH					NC	0
1976	Hexagon Racing	Penske PC3	Ford Cosworth DFV 3.0 V8	MAL	SNE	OUL	BRH	THR	BRH	MAL	SNE	BRH	THR	OUL	BRH; 4	BRH; 2								11th	27
1977	Hexagon Racing	Penske PC3	Ford Cosworth DFV 3.0 V8	MAL	SNE	OUL; 1	BRH; 4	MAL	THR; Ret	BRH	OUL	MAL; DSQ	DON; 4	BRH; DNS	THR	SNE	BRH							11th	42

=== Complete World Sportscar Championship results ===
(key) (Races in bold indicate pole position; results in italics indicate fastest lap)

Year	Entrant	Chassis	Engine	Class	1	2	3	4	5	6	7	8	9	10	11	12	13	14	15	Pos.	Points
1970	Ecurie Francorchamps	Ferrari 512S	Ferrari V12	S 5.0	DAY	SEB	BRH	MZA	TGA	SPA; 8	NÜR									NC†	-
1970	SpA Ferrari SEFAC	Ferrari 512S Coda Lunga	Ferrari V12	S 5.0								LMS; Ret	WGN	ÖST						NC†	-
1971	John Wyer Automotive Engineering	Porsche 917K	Porsche Flat-12	S 5.0	BUE; 1	DAY; Ret	SEB; 5	BRH; 3	MZA; 2	SPA; 2				ÖST; Ret	WGN; 2					NC†	-
1971	John Wyer Automotive Engineering	Porsche 908/03	Porsche Flat-8	P 3.0							TGA	NÜR; Ret								NC†	-
1971	John Wyer Automotive Engineering	Porsche 917LH	Porsche Flat-12	S 5.0									LMS; Ret							NC†	-
1972	Gulf Research Racing Company	Mirage M6	Ford-Cosworth V8	P 3.0	BUE	DAY	SEB; Ret	BRH; NC	MZA	SPA; 4	TGA	NÜR; 4		ÖST; Ret	WGN; 3					NC†	-
1972	Ecurie Francorchamps	Ferrari 365 GTB/4	Ferrari V12	GT									LMS; 4(8)							NC†	-
1973	Gulf Research Racing Company	Mirage M6	Ford-Cosworth V8	P 3.0	DAY; Ret	VAL; Ret	DIJ; Ret	MZA; Ret	SPA; 1	TGA	NÜR	LMS; Ret	ÖST; 5	WGN; 4						NC†	-
1974	Gulf Research Racing Company	Mirage GR7	Ford-Cosworth V8	P 3.0	MZA; 4	SPA; 2	NÜR; Ret	IMO; Ret	LMS; 4	ÖST; 4	WGN	RIC; 3	BRH; 3	KYA; 3						NC†	-
1975	Willi Kauhsen Racing Team	Alfa Romeo 33TT12	Alfa Romeo Flat-12	P 3.0	DAY	MUG; 4	DIJ; 4	MZA; 18	SPA; 1	ENN; 2	NÜR; 1	ÖST; 1	WGN; 1							NC†	-
1976 (Makes)	Jägermeister Max Moritz Team	Porsche 934	Porsche Flat-6 (t/c)	GT +3.0	MUG	VAL	SIL	NÜR; 1(3)												NC†	-
1976 (Makes)	Porsche Kremer Racing	Porsche 935	Porsche Flat-6 (t/c)	Group 5					ÖST; 4	WGN	DIJ									NC†	-
1977 (Makes)	Gelo Racing	Porsche 935	Porsche Flat-6 (t/c)	Group 5	DAY	MUG	SIL; Ret	NÜR	WGN	MOS	BRH	HOC	VLL							NC†	-
1978	Faltz Preparation	BMW 320	Porsche Flat-6 (t/c)	Group 5 D1	DAY	MUG; 1(3)														NC†	-
1978	Gelo Racing Team	Porsche 935	Porsche Flat-6 (t/c)	Group 5 D2			SIL; Ret	NÜR	DIJ	MIS	WGN	VLL; Ret								NC†	-
1979	Robin Hamilton AM Distributors	Aston Martin AM V8	Aston Martin V8	Group 5	DAY	MUG	DIJ	SIL; 13												NC†	-
1979	Liqui Moly Joest Racing	Porsche 935	Porsche Flat-6 (t/c)	Group 5					NÜR; 5	ENN	WGN	BRH	VLL							NC†	-
1980 (Makes)	Ault & Wiborg Ltd.	Aston Martin AM V8	Aston Martin V8	Group 5	D24	BRH	MUG	MZA	SIL; Ret											NC†	-
1980 (Makes)	Meccarillos Racing Team	Porsche 935	Porsche Flat-6 (t/c)	Group 5						NÜR; Ret										NC†	-
1980 (Makes)	Porsche System	Porsche 924 Carrera GT	Porsche Straight-4 (t/c)	GTP							LMS; 13	WGN	MOS							NC†	-
1980 (Makes)	Siegfried Brunn	Porsche 908/03	Porsche Flat-8	S+2.0										VLL; 2	DIJ; Ret					NC†	-
1980 (Drivers)	Red Lobster Racing	BMW M1	BMW Straight-6	IMSA GTX	D24	SEB; 30	MZA	RIV	SIL	NÜR	LMS	DA6	SPA	MOS	RDA					NC	0
1981	Bob Akin Motor Racing	Porsche 935 K3	Porsche Flat-6 (t/c)	IMSA GTX	D24; 2	SEB; 60	MUG													7th	96
1981	EMKA Racing	BMW M1	BMW Straight-6	Group 5/GTX				MZA; Ret	RIV	SIL; 1(2)	NÜR; 33				WGN; Ret				BRH; 1(3)	7th	96
1981	Porsche System	Porsche 936/81	Porsche Flat-6 (t/c)	Group 6								**LMS**; 1	ENN	DA6						7th	96
1981	Gitanes W.M. Racing	BMW 530i	BMW Straight-6	serT+2.5												SPA; 7/14				7th	96
1981	Electrodyne Racing	Porsche 934	Porsche Flat-6 (t/c)	IMSA GTO													MOS; 21			7th	96
1981	DeNarvaez Enterprises	Porsche 935 K3	Porsche Flat-6 (t/c)	IMSA GTX														RDA; 27		7th	96
1982	Rothmans Porsche	Porsche 956	Porsche Flat-6 (t/c)	Group C	MZA	**SIL**; 2	NÜR		SPA; 2	MUG	FUJ; Ret	BRH; 1								3rd	70
1982	Rothmans Porsche	Porsche 956 Long Tail	Porsche Flat-6 (t/c)	Group C				**LMS**; 1												3rd	70
1983	Rothmans Porsche	Porsche 956	Porsche Flat-6 (t/c)	Group C	MZA; 7	**SIL**; 1	**NÜR**; Ret		SPA; 2	**FUJ**; 1	**KYA**; 1									2nd	94
1983	Rothmans Porsche	Porsche 956 Long Tail	Porsche Flat-6 (t/c)	Group C				**LMS**; 2												2nd	94
1984	Rothmans Porsche	Porsche 956	Porsche Flat-6 (t/c)	Group C	**MZA**; 1	SIL; 10	LMS	NÜR; 1	BRH	MOS; 4	SPA; 1	IMO	FUJ	KYA	**SAN**; 1					4th	91
1985	Rothmans Porsche	Porsche 962	Porsche Flat-6 (t/c)	Group C	MUG; DSQ	MZA; 2	SIL; 2		HOC; 1	MOS; 1	SPA; 2	BRH; 1	FUJ; WD							1st	117
1985	Rothmans Porsche	Porsche 962 Long Tail	Porsche Flat-6 (t/c)	Group C				LMS; 3												1st	117
1985	Rothmans Porsche	Porsche 956 PDK	Porsche Flat-6 (t/c)	Group C										SHA; Ret						1st	117
1986	Rothmans Porsche	Porsche 962	Porsche Flat-6 (t/c)	Group C	MZA; 1	SIL; 2					NÜR; Ret	SPA; 3	FUJ; 25							1st	82
1986	Rothmans Porsche	Porsche 962 Long Tail	Porsche Flat-6 (t/c)	Group C			LMS; 1													1st	82
1986	John Fitzpatrick Racing	Porsche 956	Porsche Flat-6 (t/c)	Group C				NRS; 11												1st	82
1986	Joest Racing	Porsche 956	Porsche Flat-6 (t/c)	Group C					BRH; 2	JER										1st	82
1987	Porsche AG	Porsche 962	Porsche Flat-6 (t/c)	Group C	JMA; 2	JER; 3	MZA; 2	SIL; 3		NRS; 1				FUJ; 6						5th	99
1987	Porsche AG	Porsche 962 Long Tail	Porsche Flat-6 (t/c)	Group C					LMS; 1											5th	99
1987	Joest Racing	Porsche 962	Porsche Flat-6 (t/c)	Group C							BRH; 4	NÜR; 2	SPA; 5							5th	99
1988	Richard Lloyd Racing	Porsche 962 C GTi	Porsche Flat-6 (t/c)	Group C	JER; 4	JMA; DNS	MZA	SIL; DSQ					SPA; 5							37th	20
1988	Porsche AG	Porsche 962 C Long Tail	Porsche Flat-6 (t/c)	Group C					LMS; 2	BRN	BRH	NÜR								37th	20
1988	Takefuji Racing Team	Porsche 962 C	Porsche Flat-6 (t/c)	Group C										FUJ; 17	SAN					37th	20
1989	Richard Lloyd Racing	Porsche 962 C GTi	Porsche Flat-6 (t/c)	Group C	SUZ; 17	DIJ; 5	JMA	BRH; Ret	NÜR; 15	DON; 11	SPA	MXC; 4								22nd	18
1990	The Alpha Racing	Porsche 962 C	Porsche Flat-6 (t/c)	Group C	SUZ; 8	MZA														NC	0
1990	Konrad Motorsport	Porsche 962 C	Porsche Flat-6 (t/c)	Group C			SIL; DNS													NC	0
1990	Joest Porsche Racing	Porsche 962 C	Porsche Flat-6 (t/c)	Group C				SPA; Ret	DIJ	NÜR	DON	MTL	MXC							NC	0
1991	Joest Porsche	Porsche 962 C	Porsche Flat-6 (t/c)	Group C	SUZ	MZA	SIL	LMS; 7	NÜR	MNY	MXC; 5	APL								38th	8

^{†} No Driver's Championship existed until 1980.

=== Complete IMSA GT Results ===
Year	Entrant	Chassis	Engine	Class	1	2	3	4	5	6	7	8	9	10	11	12	13	14	15	16	17	18	Pos.	Points
1979	Vasek Polak	Porsche 935	Porsche Flat-6 (t/c)	GTX	DAY	SEB	AT1	RIV; 3	LAG	HAL	LRP	BRD	DA2	MOH; 6	SPT	PLD	RDA; 1	AT2	DA3					
1980	Red Lobster Racing	BMW M1	BMW Straight-6	GTX	DAY	SEB; 30	AT1	RIV	LAG	LRP	BRD	DA2	SPT	PLD	MOS	RDA	AT2	DA3						
1981	Bob Akin Motor Racing	Porsche 935 K3	Porsche Flat-6 (t/c)	GTX	D24; 2	SEB; 60	AT1	RIV	LAG	LRP	MOH	BRD	DA2	SPT	PLD									
1981	Electrodyne Racing	Porsche 934	Porsche Flat-6 (t/c)	GTO												MOS; 21								
1981	DeNarvaez Enterprises	Porsche 935 K3	Porsche Flat-6 (t/c)	GTX													RDA; 27	AT2	POC	DA3				
1982	Bob Akin Motor Racing	Porsche 935 K3	Porsche Flat-6 (t/c)	GTP	D24; 2	SEB; 12	AT1	RIV; 4	LAG	CHR	OH1	LRP	DA2	BRD	SPT	PLD	MOS; 4	RDA; 33	OH2	AT2; 7	POC		9th	61
1982	Henn's Swap Shop	Porsche 935 K3	Porsche Flat-6 (t/c)	GTP																		DA3; 3	9th	61
1983	Henn's Swap Shop	Porsche 935 K3	Porsche Flat-6 (t/c)	GTP	D24	MIA; 8	SEB; 56	ATL	RIV; 1	LAG	MOH	CHR	LRP	DA2	BRD	SPT	PLD	MOS	RDA	POC	DA3			
1984	Henn's Swap Shop	Porsche 935 L	Porsche Flat-6 (t/c)	GTP	D24; 2	MIA	SEB; 3																3rd	164
1984	Al Holbert Racing	Porsche 962	Porsche Flat-6 (t/c)	GTP				ATL; 50			CHR; 17	LRP	MOH; 1	WG1; 1	PLD; 3	SPT	RDA; 1	POC; 1	MGN; 9	WG2; 30	DA2; 1		3rd	164
1984	Bayside Disposal Racing	Porsche 962	Porsche Flat-6 (t/c)	GTP					RIV; 2	LAG; 8													3rd	164
1985	Al Holbert Racing	Porsche 962	Porsche Flat-6 (t/c)	GTP	D24; 2	MIA; 1	SEB; 2	ATL	RIV	LAG	CHR; 1	LRP	MOH; 1	WG1; 1	PLD; 20	SPT; 7	RDA; 26	POC; 1	WG2; 1	COL	DA2		2nd	154
1986	Al Holbert Racing	Porsche 962	Porsche Flat-6 (t/c)	GTP	D24; 1	MIA; 6	SEB; 3	ATL; 3	RIV; 28	LAG	CHR; 18	LRP; 4	MOH; 1	WPB; 4	WG1; 1	PLD; 7	SPT; 2	RDA	WG2; 2	COL	DA2; 6		3rd	154
1987	Al Holbert Racing	Porsche 962	Porsche Flat-6 (t/c)	GTP	DAY; 1	MIA; 4	SEB	ATL	RIV	LAG	LRP	MOH	WPB; 2	WGN; 20	PLD	SPT	RDA	SAT; 1	COL; 4	DMF; 17			6th	93
1988	Al Holbert Racing	Porsche 962	Porsche Flat-6 (t/c)	GTP	DAY; 7	MIA; 4	SEB	ATL; 4	WPB; 17	LRP	MOH; 6	WGN; 2	PLD	SPT	RDA; 2	SAT; 11	COL	DMF					11th	73
1989	Miller High Life/BF Goodrich 962	Porsche 962	Porsche Flat-6 (t/c)	GTP	DAY; 1	MIA; 4																	20th	34
1989	Momo/Gebhardt Racing	Porsche 962	Porsche Flat-6 (t/c)	GTP			SEB; 4	ATL	WPB; 14	LRP	MOH	WGN											20th	34
1989	Busby Racing	Porsche 962	Porsche Flat-6 (t/c)	GTP									RDA; 9	PLD	KNS	SAT	SPT; 9	TPA	DMF				20th	34
1990	MOMO Gebhardt	Porsche 962	Porsche Flat-6 (t/c)	GTP	DAY; 41	MIA; 17	SEB	ATL; 17	WPB; 24	KNS	LRP	MOH	WGN; 6	SPT	PLD	RDA	SAT	TPA; 7	DMF				29th	20
1991	Gunnar Racing	Gunnar 966	Porsche Flat-6 (t/c)	GTP	DAY; 40	WPB; 6	SEB																24th	24
1991	MOMO Gebhardt/Joest Racing	Porsche 962	Porsche Flat-6 (t/c)	GTP				MIA; 7	ATL; 5	KNS	LRP	MOH	NOL			PLD; 6	RDA; 14	DMF					24th	24
1991	MOMO Gebhardt/Joest Racing	Gebhardt C901	Audi Straight-5 (t/c)	GTP										WGN; 6	LAG								24th	24
1993	MOMO	Nissan NPT-90	Nissan V6 (t/c)	GTP	DAY; 3	MIA; 4	SEB; 2	ATO; 6	LRP; 5	MOH; 3	WGN; 4	RDA; 4	LAG; 4	PLD; 4	PHX; 4								4th	88
1994	Auto Toy Store	Spice SE89P	Chevrolet V8	WSC	DAY; 45	SEB; 2	ATL	LRP	WGN	IRP	LAG	PLD	PHX										28th	27
1995	Auto Toy Store	Spice SE90	Chevrolet V8	WSC	DAY; 64	SEB; 2	ATL	YAW	LRP	WGN	SPT	MOS	TWS	PHX	NOL								NC	0
1996	Champion Porsche	Porsche 911 GT2	Porsche Flat-6	GTS-1	DAY; 54	SEB; 9	ATL	TWS	LRP	WGN	SPT	MOS	DAL	DAF									23rd	22
1997	Moretti Racing	Ferrari 333 SP	Ferrari V12	WSC	DAY; 7	S12	ATL	LRP	WGN	SPT	MOS	PPK	SE2	LAG									NC	0
1998	Matthews-Colucci Racing	Riley & Scott Mk III	Ford 5.0 L V8	WSC	S12; 5	LVS	LRP	ATL	MOS	SEB	PET	LAG											46th	1

=== Complete 24 Hours of Le Mans results ===
Year	Team	Co-drivers	Car	Class	Laps	Pos.	Class pos.
1970	(Italy) SpA Ferrari SEFAC	(Sweden) Ronnie Peterson	Ferrari 512S	S 5.0	39	DNF	DNF
1971	(United Kingdom) John Wyer Automotive Engineering Ltd.	(Switzerland) Jo Siffert	Porsche 917LH	S 5.0		DNF	DNF
1972	(Belgium) Ecurie Francorchamps	(Belgium) Teddy Pilette (United Kingdom) Richard Bond	Ferrari 365 GTB/4	GT; 5.0	301	8th	4th
1973	(United Kingdom) Gulf Research Racing	(New Zealand) Howden Ganley	Mirage M6-Ford Cosworth	S 3.0	163	DNF	DNF
1974	(United Kingdom) Gulf Research Racing	(United Kingdom) Mike Hailwood	Gulf GR7-Ford Cosworth	S 3.0	317	4th	4th
1975	(United Kingdom) Gulf Research Racing	(Belgium) Jacky Ickx	Mirage GR8-Ford Cosworth	S 3.0	336	**1st**	**1st**
1976	(United States) Grand Touring Cars Inc.	(Australia) Vern Schuppan	Mirage GR8-Ford Cosworth	S 3.0	326	5th	4th
1977	(France) Renault Sport	(France) Jean-Pierre Jabouille	Renault Alpine A442	S +2.0	257	DNF	DNF
1978	(France) Renault Sport	(France) Jean-Pierre Jarier	Renault Alpine A442A	S +2.0	162	DNF	DNF
1979	(United States) Grand Touring Cars Inc. Ford Concessionaires France	(United Kingdom) David Hobbs (Australia) Vern Schuppan	Mirage M10-Ford Cosworth	S +2.0	262	DNF	DNF
1980	(Germany) Porsche System	(United States) Al Holbert	Porsche 924 Carrera GT	GTP	305	13th	6th
1981	(Germany) Porsche System	(Belgium) Jacky Ickx	Porsche 936	S +2.0	354	**1st**	**1st**
1982	(Germany) Rothmans Porsche System	(Belgium) Jacky Ickx	Porsche 956	C	359	**1st**	**1st**
1983	(Germany) Rothmans Porsche System	(Belgium) Jacky Ickx	Porsche 956	C	370	**2nd**	**2nd**
1985	(Germany) Rothmans Porsche	(Germany) Hans-Joachim Stuck	Porsche 962C	C1	367	**3rd**	**3rd**
1986	(Germany) Rothmans Porsche	(United States) Al Holbert (Germany) Hans-Joachim Stuck	Porsche 962C	C1	368	**1st**	**1st**
1987	(Germany) Rothmans Porsche	(Germany) Hans-Joachim Stuck (United States) Al Holbert	Porsche 962C	C1	355	**1st**	**1st**
1988	(Germany) Porsche AG	(Germany) Hans-Joachim Stuck (Germany) Klaus Ludwig	Porsche 962C	C1	394	**2nd**	**2nd**
1989	(United Kingdom) Richard Lloyd Racing	(United Kingdom) Tiff Needell (United Kingdom) James Weaver	Porsche 962C GTi	C1	339	DNF	DNF
1990	(Germany) Joest Porsche Racing	(Germany) Hans-Joachim Stuck (Germany) Frank Jelinski	Porsche 962C	C1	350	4th	4th
1991	(Austria) Konrad Motorsport (Germany) Joest Porsche Racing	(Germany) Hans-Joachim Stuck (Germany) Frank Jelinski	Porsche 962C	C2	347	7th	7th
1992	(United Kingdom) ADA Engineering	(United Kingdom) Tiff Needell (United Kingdom) Justin Bell	Porsche 962C GTi	C3	284	12th	5th
1993	(France) Courage Compétition	(France) Lionel Robert (France) Pascal Fabre	Courage C30LM-Porsche	C2	347	10th	5th
1994	(United Kingdom) Gulf Oil Racing	(United Kingdom) Robin Donovan (Germany) Jürgen Lässig	Kremer K8 Spyder-Porsche	LMP1 /C90	316	6th	**3rd**
1995	(United Kingdom) Harrods Mach One Racing (United Kingdom) David Price Racing	(United Kingdom) Andy Wallace (United Kingdom) Justin Bell	McLaren F1 GTR	GT1	296	**3rd**	**2nd**
1996	(United Kingdom) Harrods Mach One Racing (United Kingdom) David Price Racing	(United Kingdom) Andy Wallace (France) Olivier Grouillard	McLaren F1 GTR	GT1	328	6th	5th

=== Complete British Saloon Car Championship results ===
(key) (Races in bold indicate pole position; races in italics indicate fastest lap.)

Year	Team	Car	Class	1	2	3	4	5	6	7	8	9	10	11	12	DC	Pts	Class
1973	BMW-Alpina	BMW 3.0 CSL	D	BRH	SIL	THR	THR	SIL	ING	BRH	SIL ovr:1 cls:1	BRH				20th	9	4th
1976	British Leyland	Triumph Dolomite Sprint	C	BRH	SIL	OUL	THR	THR	SIL	BRH ovr:2 cls:1	MAL	SNE	BRH			23rd	9	8th
1978	British Leyland	Triumph Dolomite Sprint	C	SIL	OUL	THR	BRH	SIL	DON	MAL	BRH ovr:7 cls:2	DON	BRH	THR	OUL	30th	6	9th

=== Complete Bathurst 1000 results ===
Year	Team	Co-drivers	Car	Class	Laps	Pos.	Class pos.
1977	(Australia) Brian Foley Pty Limited	(Australia) Garry Leggatt	Alfa Romeo 2000	Up to 2000cc	150	8th	1st
1978	(Australia) Ron Hodgson Channel 7 Racing	(Austria) Dieter Quester	Holden LX Torana SS A9X Hatchback	A	5	DNF	DNF
1979	(Australia) Brian Foley P/L	(Australia) Phil McDonnell	Alfa Romeo Alfetta GTV	C	145	9th	2nd
1980	(Australia) Brian Foley Pty Ltd	(Australia) Phil McDonnell	Alfa Romeo Alfetta GTV 2000	1601-2000cc	16	DNF	DNF
1981	(Australia) Peter Stuyvesant International Racing	(Canada) Allan Moffat	Mazda RX-7	6 Cylinder & Rotary	119	3rd	1st

=== Complete WRC results ===
Year	Entrant	Car	1	2	3	4	5	6	7	8	9	10	11	12	13	WDC	Pts
1987	GM Euro Sport	Vauxhall Astra GTE	MON	SWE	POR	KEN	FRA	GRE	USA	NZL	ARG	FIN	CIV	ITA	GBR; Ret	NC	0
1988	GM Dealer Sport	Vauxhall Astra GTE	MON	SWE	POR	KEN	FRA	GRE	USA	NZL	ARG	FIN	CIV	ITA	GBR; 29	NC	0

Sporting positions
Preceded by Henri Pescarolo; Gérard Larrousse	Winner of the 24 Hours of Le Mans; 1975; With: Jacky Ickx	Succeeded by Jacky Ickx; Gijs van Lennep
Preceded by Jean Rondeau; Jean-Pierre Jaussaud	Winner of the 24 Hours of Le Mans; 1981-1982; With: Jacky Ickx	Succeeded by Vern Schuppan; Al Holbert; Hurley Haywood
Preceded by Klaus Ludwig; Paolo Barilla; Louis Krages	Winner of the 24 Hours of Le Mans; 1986-1987; With: Hans-Joachim Stuck & Al Holbert	Succeeded by Jan Lammers; Johnny Dumfries; Andy Wallace
Preceded by Stefan Bellof	World Sportscar Championship; Champion; 1985–1986; With: Hans-Joachim Stuck (1985)	Succeeded by Raul Boesel
Awards
Preceded by Jonathan Palmer	Autosport; British Competition Driver of the Year; 1984	Succeeded by Nigel Mansell
