= Spice SE89 =

Spice SE89 may refer to:

- Spice SE89C, a group C sports prototype racing car
- Spice SE89P, an IMSA GTP sports prototype racing car
