= 1990 IMSA GT Championship =

20th season of the racing series organized by IMSA

Seasons
- ← 1989 1991 →

The 1990 Camel GT Championship season was the 20th season of the IMSA GT Championship auto racing series. It consisted of GTP and Lights classes of prototypes, as well as Grand Tourer-style racing cars which ran in the GTO and GTU classes, as well as a tube-frame All-American Challenge (AAC) class during select GT-only rounds. It began on February 3, 1990, and ended November 11, 1990, after twenty rounds.

== Schedule ==
The GT and Prototype classes did not participate in all events, nor did they race together at shorter events. The AAC class only participated in GT-only events. Races marked with All had all classes on track at the same time.

Rnd	Race	Length	Class	Circuit	Date
1	SunBank 24 at Daytona	24 Hours	All	Daytona International Speedway	February 3 February 4
2	Nissan Grand Prix of Miami	2 Hours 45 Minutes	Proto	Streets of Miami	February 25
2	Nissan Grand Prix of Miami	45 Minutes	GT	Streets of Miami	February 25
3	12 Hours of Sebring	12 Hours	All	Sebring International Raceway	March 17
4	Nissan Grand Prix of Atlanta	500 km	Proto	Road Atlanta	April 1
5	Toyota Grand Prix of Long Beach	1 Hour	GT	Long Beach Street Circuit	April 21
6	Toyota Grand Prix of Palm Beach	3 Hours	Proto	West Palm Beach Street Circuit	April 22
7	Camel Grand Prix of the Heartland	2 Hours	GT	Heartland Park	May 5
7	Camel Grand Prix of the Heartland	300 km	Proto	Heartland Park	May 6
8	Toyota Trucks Lime Rock Grand Prix	150 Laps	Proto	Lime Rock Park	May 28
9	Nissan Grand Prix of Ohio	500 km	Proto	Mid-Ohio Sports Car Course	June 3
9	Nissan Grand Prix of Ohio	300 km	GT	Mid-Ohio Sports Car Course	June 3
10	Nissan Grand Prix of Mosport	300 km	GT	Mosport Park	June 24
11	Camel Continental	500 km	Proto	Watkins Glen International	July 1
12	Grand Prix of the Meadowlands	45 Minutes	GT	Meadowlands Sports Complex	July 14
13	California Camel Grand Prix	300 km	Proto	Sears Point Raceway	July 15
14	G.I. Joe's Camel Grand Prix	300 km	Proto	Portland International Raceway	July 29
14	G.I. Joe's Camel Grand Prix	1 Hour 30 Minutes	GT	Portland International Raceway	July 29
15	Nissan Grand Prix of Road America	300 km	GT	Road America	August 19
15	Nissan Grand Prix of Road America	500 km	Proto	Road America	August 19
16	Nissan Camel Grand Prix of San Antonio	2 Hours	Proto	San Antonio Street Circuit	September 2
16	Nissan Camel Grand Prix of San Antonio	45 Minutes	GT	San Antonio Street Circuit	September 2
17	The New York 500	500 km	GT	Watkins Glen International	September 23
18	The Jamesway 300	2 Hours	GT	Lime Rock Park	September 29
19	Nissan World Challenge of Tampa	200 Miles	Proto	Tampa Street Circuit	September 30
20	Camel Grand Prix of Greater San Diego	1 Hour	GT	Del Mar Fairgrounds	November 10
20	Camel Grand Prix of Greater San Diego	1 Hour 45 Minutes	Proto	Del Mar Fairgrounds	November 11

== Season results ==
Rnd	Circuit	GTP Winning Team	Lights Winning Team	GTO Winning Team	GTU Winning Team	Results
Rnd	Circuit	GTP Winning Drivers	Lights Winning Drivers	GTO Winning Drivers	GTU Winning Drivers	Results
1	Daytona	(United Kingdom) #61 Castrol Jaguar	(United States) #36 Erie Scientific Racing	(United States) #15 Tru-Cur Roush	(United States) #71 Peter Uria Racing	Results
1	Daytona	(United States) Davy Jones (United Kingdom) Andy Wallace (Netherlands) Jan Lammers	(United States) John Grooms (United States) Frank Jellinek (United States) Michael Greenfield	(United States) Robby Gordon (United States) Calvin Fish (United States) Lyn St. James	(United States) Peter Uria (United States) Bob Dotson (United States) Jim Pace (United States) Rusty Scott	Results
2	Miami	(United States) #84 Nissan Performance	(United Kingdom) #32 Spice Engineering	(United States) #75 Cunningham Racing	(United States) #96 Leitzinger Racing	Results
2	Miami	(Australia) Geoff Brabham (United States) Chip Robinson (United States) Bob Earl	(Mexico) Tomas Lopez (Spain) Fermín Vélez	(New Zealand) Steve Millen	(United States) David Loring	Results
3	Sebring	(United States) #83 Nissan Performance	(United States) #8 Essex Racing	(United States) #15 Roush Racing	(United States) #95 Leitzinger Racing	Results
3	Sebring	(Republic of Ireland) Derek Daly (United States) Bob Earl	(United States) Tom Hessert (United States) Charles Morgan	(United States) Robby Gordon (United States) Calvin Fish (United States) Lyn St. James	(United States) Butch Leitzinger (United States) Chuck Kurtz (United States) David Loring	Results
4	Road Atlanta	(United States) #83 Nissan Performance	(United Kingdom) #32 Spice Engineering	Did Not Participate	Did Not Participate	Results
4	Road Atlanta	(Australia) Geoff Brabham (Republic of Ireland) Derek Daly	(Mexico) Tomás López (Spain) Fermín Vélez			Results
5	Long Beach	Did Not Participate	Did Not Participate	(United States) #6 Whistler Radar	(United States) #38 Mazda Motorsports	Results
5	Long Beach			(United States) Dorsey Schroeder	(United States) John Finger	Results
6	Palm Beach	(United States) #83 Nissan Performance	(United Kingdom) #32 Spice Engineering	Did Not Participate	Did Not Participate	Results
6	Palm Beach	(Australia) Geoff Brabham (Republic of Ireland) Derek Daly	(Mexico) Tomás López (Spain) Fermín Vélez			Results
7	Heartland	(United States) #99 All American Racers	(United States) #4 S & L Racing	(United States) #1 Mazda	(United States) #37 Mazda Motorsports	Results
7	Heartland	(Argentina) Juan Manuel Fangio II	(United States) Scott Schubot (United States) Linda Ludemann	(United States) Pete Halsmer	(United States) Lance Stewart	Results
8	Lime Rock	(United Kingdom) #61 Castrol Jaguar	(Canada) #80 Brieri Racing	Did Not Participate	Did Not Participate	Results
8	Lime Rock	(United States) Price Cobb (Denmark) John Nielsen	(Italy) Martino Finotto (Italy) Ruggero Melgrati			Results
9	Mid-Ohio	(United States) #83 Nissan Performance	(United Kingdom) #32 Spice Engineering	(United States) #1 Mazda	(United States) #07 Full Time Racing	Results
9	Mid-Ohio	(Australia) Geoff Brabham (Republic of Ireland) Derek Daly	(United Kingdom) Perry McCarthy (Mexico) Tomás López	(United States) Pete Halsmer	(United States) Stu Hayner	Results
10	Mosport Park	Did Not Participate	Did Not Participate	(United States) #75 Cunningham Racing	(United States) #00 Full Time Racing	Results
10	Mosport Park			(New Zealand) Steve Millen	(United States) Don Knowles	Results
11	Watkins Glen	(United States) #84 Nissan Performance	(Canada) #80 Brieri Racing	Did Not Participate	Did Not Participate	Results
11	Watkins Glen	(United States) Bob Earl (United States) Chip Robinson	(Italy) Martino Finotto (Italy) Ruggero Melgrati			Results
12	Meadowlands	Did Not Participate	Did Not Participate	(United States) #9 Whistler Radar	(United States) #96 Leitzinger Racing	Results
12	Meadowlands			(United States) Robby Gordon	(United States) David Loring	Results
13	Sears Point	(United States) #99 All American Racers	(United Kingdom) #32 Spice Engineering	Did Not Participate	Did Not Participate	Results
13	Sears Point	(Argentina) Juan Manuel Fangio II	(United States) Dan Marvin (Mexico) Tomás López			Results
14	Portland	(United Kingdom) #60 Castrol Jaguar	(United Kingdom) #32 Spice Engineering	(United States) #6 Whistler Radar	(United States) #37 Mazda Motorsports	Results
14	Portland	(United States) Davy Jones	(United States) Parker Johnstone (Mexico) Tomás López	(United States) Dorsey Schroeder	(United States) Lance Stewart	Results
15	Road America	(United States) #83 Nissan Performance	(Canada) #80 Brieri Racing	(United States) #75 Cunningham Racing	(United States) #37 Mazda Motorsports	Results
15	Road America	(Australia) Geoff Brabham	(Italy) Martino Finotto (Italy) Ruggero Melgrati	(New Zealand) Steve Millen	(United States) Lance Stewart	Results
16	San Antonio	(United States) #99 All American Racers	(United Kingdom) #32 Spice Engineering	(United States) #1 Mazda Motorsports	(United States) #96 Leitzinger Racing	Results
16	San Antonio	(Argentina) Juan Manuel Fangio II	(United States) Parker Johnstone (Mexico) Tomás López	(United States) Pete Halsmer	(United States) David Loring	Results
17	Watkins Glen	Did Not Participate	Did Not Participate	(United States) #6 Whistler Radar	(United States) #37 Mazda Motorsports	Results
17	Watkins Glen			(United States) Dorsey Schroeder	(United States) John Finger (United States) Amos Johnson	Results
18	Lime Rock	Did Not Participate	Did Not Participate	(United States) #9 Whistler Radar	(United States) #00 Full Time Racing	Results
18	Lime Rock			(United States) Robby Gordon	(United States) Don Knowles	Results
19	Tampa	(United States) #16 Dyson Racing	(Canada) #19 David Tennyson	Did Not Participate	Did Not Participate	Results
19	Tampa	(United Kingdom) James Weaver	(Italy) Martino Finotto (Italy) Ruggero Melgrati			Results
20	Del Mar	(United States) #99 All American Racers	(United States) #48 Comptech Racing	(United States) #9 Whistler Radar	(United States) #00 Full Time Racing	Results
20	Del Mar	(Argentina) Juan Manuel Fangio II	(United States) Parker Johnstone (United States) Doug Peterson	(United States) Robby Gordon	(United States) Don Knowles	Results

== Drivers Championships ==
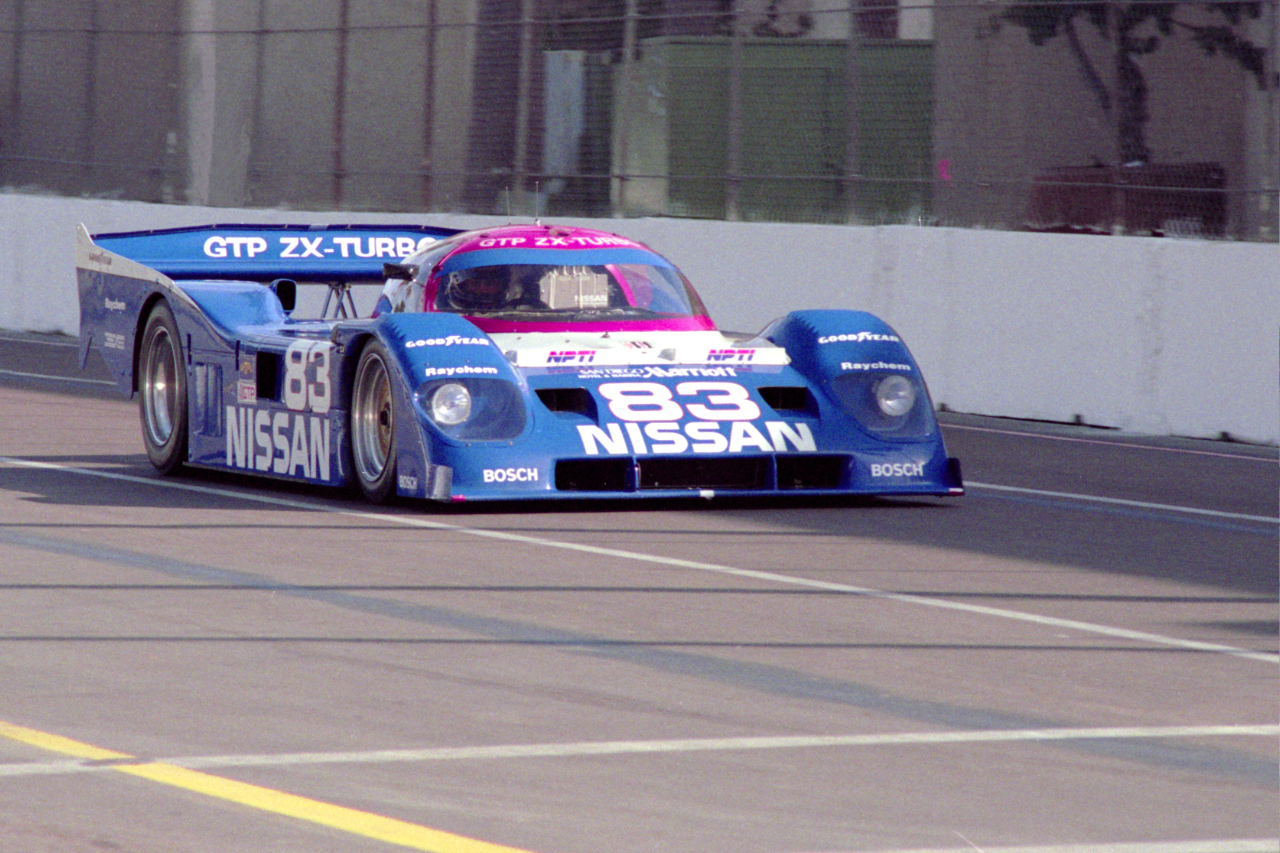
Geoff Brabham's Nissan NPT-90 at the 1990 Grand Prix of Greater San Diego

Geoff Brabham won the GTP Drivers Championship driving a Nissan GTP ZX-T and a Nissan NPT-90.

== Manufacturers championships ==
A championship for manufacturers was awarded to each of the four classes. For the prototype classes, only the manufacturer of the engine was used rather than the manufacturer of the chassis.

Points were awarded to the top 10 on the scale of 20-15-12-10-8-6-4-3-2-1, with exception for the 12 Hours of Sebring, which added five points to each position on the scale, and the 24 Hours of Daytona, which added eight points.

Only the highest-ranking entry from a manufacturer was awarded points at each event. Any other finishes by that manufacturer were merely skipped.

=== GTP Championship ===
Pos	Manufacturer	Rd 1	Rd 2	Rd 3	Rd 4	Rd 6	Rd 7	Rd 8	Rd 9	Rd 11	Rd 13	Rd 14	Rd 15	Rd 16	Rd 19	Rd 20	Total
1	(Japan) Nissan	14	20	25	20	20	15	10	20	20	15	10	20	15	15	12	251
2	(United Kingdom) Jaguar	28		17	15	12	8	20	2	12	10	20	15	3	10	15	187
3	(Japan) Toyota	9	4	7	12	4	20	8	12	3	20	15	12	20	6	20	172
4	(West Germany) Porsche	20	12	15	10	3	2	6	8	15	8	3	10	8	20	10	150
5	(United States) Chevrolet			8	3	10	12	15	10	1	2	12	4	2			79
6	(United States) Pontiac				2	6		4	4		3	6		1	2	3	31
7	(United States) Oldsmobile									4				6			10
8	(West Germany) Audi		6														6
9	(Italy) Ferrari									2							2

=== Lights Championship ===
Pos	Manufacturer	Rd 1	Rd 2	Rd 3	Rd 4	Rd 6	Rd 7	Rd 8	Rd 9	Rd 11	Rd 13	Rd 14	Rd 15	Rd 16	Rd 19	Rd 20	Total
1	(United States) Buick	20	20	25	20	20	20	15	20	12	20	20	15	20	15	12	274
2	(Italy) Ferrari	9	15	17	15	15	12	20	12	20	12	15	20	4	20	15	221
3	(United States) Pontiac	23	4	20	8	3	4				4			8		20	94
4	(Japan) Mazda	28	1	6	6			10		15			8				74
5	(United States) Chevrolet	18									6	8					32

=== GTO Championship ===
Pos	Manufacturer	Rd 1	Rd 2	Rd 3	Rd 5	Rd 7	Rd 9	Rd 10	Rd 12	Rd 14	Rd 15	Rd 16	Rd 17	Rd 18	Rd 20	Total
1	(United States) Mercury	28	12	25	20	15	15	12	20	20	10	8	20	20	20	245
2	(Japan) Mazda	23	15	17	15	20	20	8	15	10	6	20	8	6	15	198
3	(Japan) Nissan		20		12	3	10	20	12	15	20	15		15	12	154
4	(United States) Chevrolet	14	6	15	6	4	2	10	4	4	2	10	10	3	8	98
5	(Italy) Ferrari					2	12	15			15		15	8		67
6	(United States) Ford	16	8		8				6						6	44

=== GTU Championship ===
Pos	Manufacturer	Rd 1	Rd 2	Rd 3	Rd 5	Rd 7	Rd 9	Rd 10	Rd 12	Rd 14	Rd 15	Rd 16	Rd 17	Rd 18	Rd 20	Total
1	(Japan) Mazda	28	10	20	20	20	12	15	12	20	20	10	20	12	15	234
2	(United States) Dodge	12	15	13	3	12	20	20	15	15	12	15	12	20	20	204
3	(Japan) Nissan	14	20	25	10	15	15	8	20	10	15	20	2	15	12	201
4	(West Germany) Porsche	23						10		2	1	1	8	6		51
5	(United States) Pontiac	16	4	8												28
