= San Antonio Street Circuit =

Motorsports Park in Texas

- The San Antonio Street Circuit used by IMSA from 1987 to 1990
- Location: San Antonio, Texas
- Coordinates: 29°25′20.74″N 98°29′7.37″W
- Opened: 1987
- Closed: 1990
- Major events: IMSA GT Championship (1987–1990); Barber Pro Series (1987–1988)

Street Circuit (1987–1990)
- Length: 2.690 km (1.671 mi)
- Turns: 10
- Race lap record: 1:00.754 ( (South Africa) Wayne Taylor, Spice SE89P, 1990, IMSA GTP)

The San Antonio Street Circuit was a temporary street circuit located in San Antonio, Texas, which hosted IMSA GT Championship races between 1987 and 1990.

== Lap records ==
The fastest official race lap records at the San Antonio Street Circuit are listed as:

Category	Time	Driver	Vehicle	Event
Street Circuit (1987–1990): 1.671 mi (2.690 km)
IMSA GTP	1:00.754	Wayne Taylor	Spice SE89P	1990 Nissan Camel Grand Prix of San Antonio
IMSA GTP Lights	1:05.578	Ruggero Melgrati	Spice SE90P	1990 Nissan Camel Grand Prix of San Antonio
IMSA GTO	1:08.160	Dorsey Schroeder	Mercury Cougar XR-7	1990 Nissan Camel Grand Prix of San Antonio
IMSA GTU	1:12.667	David Loring	Nissan 240SX	1990 Nissan Camel Grand Prix of San Antonio
IMSA AAC	1:15.615	Del Russo Taylor	Chevrolet Camaro	1990 Nissan Camel Grand Prix of San Antonio
