= Spice SE88P =

Sports prototype race car

- Category: IMSA GTP/GTP Lights
- Designer(s): Graham Humphrys
- Successor: Spice SE89P

Technical specifications
- Chassis: Aluminum honeycomb monocoque covered in carbon fiber composite and kevlar body
- Suspension (front): double wishbones, coil springs over shock absorbers, anti-roll bar
- Suspension (rear): double wishbones, rocker-actuated coil springs over shock absorbers, anti-roll bar
- Engine: Pontiac/Buick/Pontiac/Ferrari 2.7–5.4 L (164.8–329.5 cu in) L4/V6/V8, naturally-aspirated/twin-turbocharged, mid-engined
- Transmission: Hewland DGB 5-speed manual
- Power: 370–550 hp (280–410 kW)
- Tires: Goodyear

Competition history
Entries	Podiums
143	1

The Spice SE88P is an IMSA GTP sports prototype race car, designed, developed and built by British manufacturer Spice Engineering, for sports car racing in the IMSA GT Championship, in 1988.
