= GAINSCO =

Holding company

GAINSCO, Inc.
- Industry: Financial services
- Founded: 1978; 48 years ago Fort Worth, Texas, U.S.
- Headquarters: Dallas, Texas, U.S.
- Area served: Alabama; Arizona; Arkansas; Florida; Georgia; Illinois; Indiana; Maryland; Missouri; Mississippi; New Mexico; Ohio; Oklahoma; Oregon; Pennsylvania; South Carolina; Tennessee; Texas; Utah; Virginia; Wisconsin
- Key people: Michael S. Johnston (President and Chief Executive Officer)
- Products: Auto Insurance
- Number of employees: 600 (2021)
- Website: www.gainsco.com

GAINSCO (General Agents Insurance Company of America) is a Dallas, Texas-based holding company established in 1978 in Fort Worth, Texas by Joseph Macchia, who resigned from the enterprise in 1998 to pursue other interests.

== History ==
GAINSCO's insurance operation was originally chartered as an underwriter of Commercial risks, operations that were discontinued in 2002. It marketed its commercial insurance through managing general agents, using "GAINSCO" and the block super-scribed letters "GA" as its primary logo identifiers. These letters were derived from the abbreviated version of the name of the company's primary insurance subsidiary at that time, General Agents Insurance Company of America, Inc. This commercial insurance company was sold in 2007.

Beginning in 2005, a newly created GAINSCO logo mark incorporated a rising arrow in its name to inspire a progressively upward company. Registered marks include GAINSCO Auto Insurance and Are You Driven.

The A.M. Best rating of the insurance subsidiary has increased multiple times moving from a "Vulnerable" financial strength rating of "B−" to the current "Excellent" financial strength rating of "A−".

On December 31 2020, State Farm Insurance announced its acquisition of GAINSCO as an owned subsidiary for $400 million.
