= Tampa Street Circuit =

Motorsports Park in Florida

- Location: Tampa, FL, USA
- Coordinates: 27°59′25.88″N 82°21′36.23″W
- Opened: 1988
- Closed: 1990
- Major events: IMSA GT Championship (1989–1990); Barber Pro Series (1989–1990)

Street Circuit (1988–1990)
- Length: 3.060 km (1.901 mi)
- Turns: 12
- Race lap record: 1:05.690 ( (Australia) Geoff Brabham, Nissan NPT-90, 1990, IMSA GTP)

The Tampa Street Circuit was a temporary street circuit located at the Florida State Fairgrounds in Tampa, Florida, which hosted IMSA GT Championship races between 1989 and 1990.

== Lap records ==
The fastest official race lap records at the Tampa Street Circuit are listed as:

Category	Time	Driver	Vehicle	Event
Street Circuit (1988–1990): 1.901 mi (3.060 km)
IMSA GTP	1:05.690	Geoff Brabham	Nissan NPT-90	1990 Nissan World Challenge of Tampa
Group C	1:09.146	Oscar Larrauri	Porsche 962 C	1988 GTE World Challenge of Tampa
IMSA GTP Lights	1:11.784	Fermín Vélez	Spice SE90P	1990 Nissan World Challenge of Tampa
