= Chip Robinson =

American racecar driver

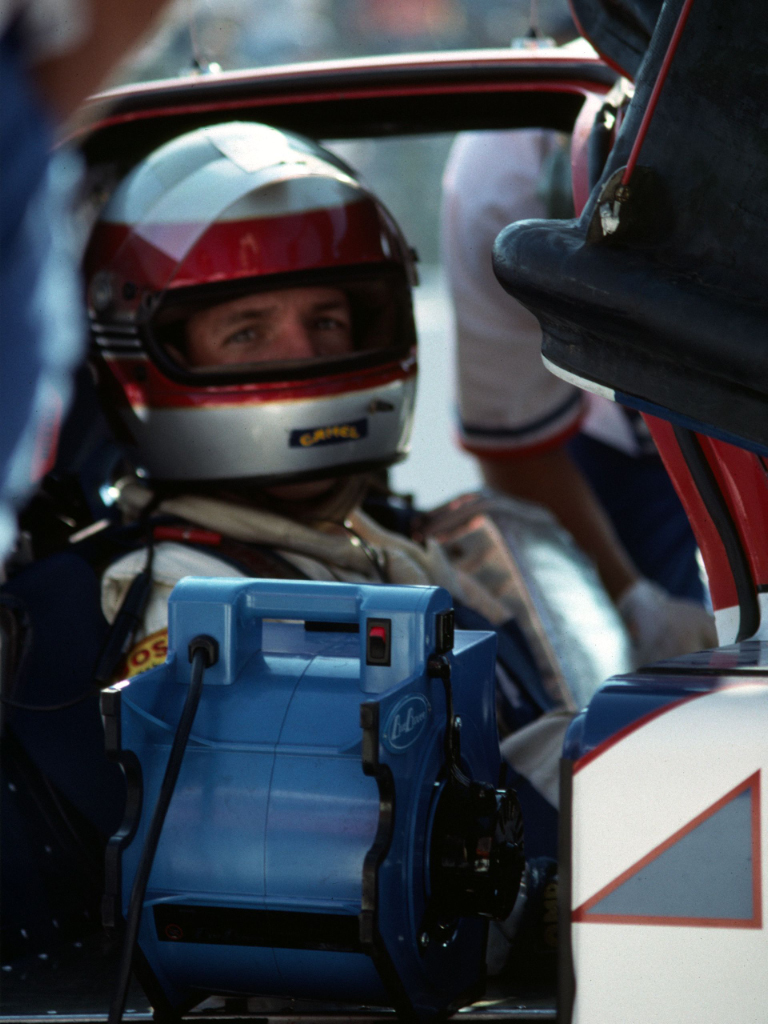
Robinson in the Nissan NPT-90 car at the IMSA Del Mar Grand Prix – October 1990

Chip Robinson (born March 29, 1954, in Philadelphia, Pennsylvania) is an American retired race car driver. He won the 1987 IMSA Camel GT series championship and the 1987 24 Hours of Daytona (with Al Holbert, Derek Bell, and Al Unser Jr. in a Porsche and the 1989 12 Hours of Sebring (with Arie Luyendyk and Geoff Brabham) in a Nissan. He made five CART starts in 1986 and 1987 with a best finish of sixth at the 1987 Long Beach Grand Prix. He is currently a contractor residing in Augusta, Georgia with his wife and one son who aspires to drive as well.

Robinson served as race director of the US Formula 4 championship, a race series to develop young drivers. He previously was race director for the Formula Atlantic, F2000, and F1600 race series.

== IROC Involvement ==
Robinson was invited to the International Race of Champions in 1988. During this time, his best finish was second place, at Riverside International Raceway and was involved in an accident in 1986 at the same track with Doc Bundy and Lyn St. James.

== CART PPG Indy Car World Series ==
Year	Team	Chassis	Engine	1	2	3	4	5	6	7	8	9	10	11	12	13	14	15	16	17	Rank	Pts.	Ref
1986	Dick Simon Racing	Lola	Cosworth	PHX	LBH	INDY	MIL	POR	MEA; 14	CLE	TOR	MIC	POC	MDO	SAN	MIC	ROA	LAG	PHX	MIA; 7	26th	6	
1987	Machinists Union Racing	March	Cosworth	LBH; 6	PHX	INDY	MIL	POR	MEA; 25	CLE	TOR	MIC	POC	ROA	MDA	NAZ; 15	LAG	MIA			26th	8	

Sporting positions
Preceded by Arie Luyendyk	CART Rookie of the Year; 1986	Succeeded by Fabrizio Barbazza
