= Bob Earl =

American racing driver

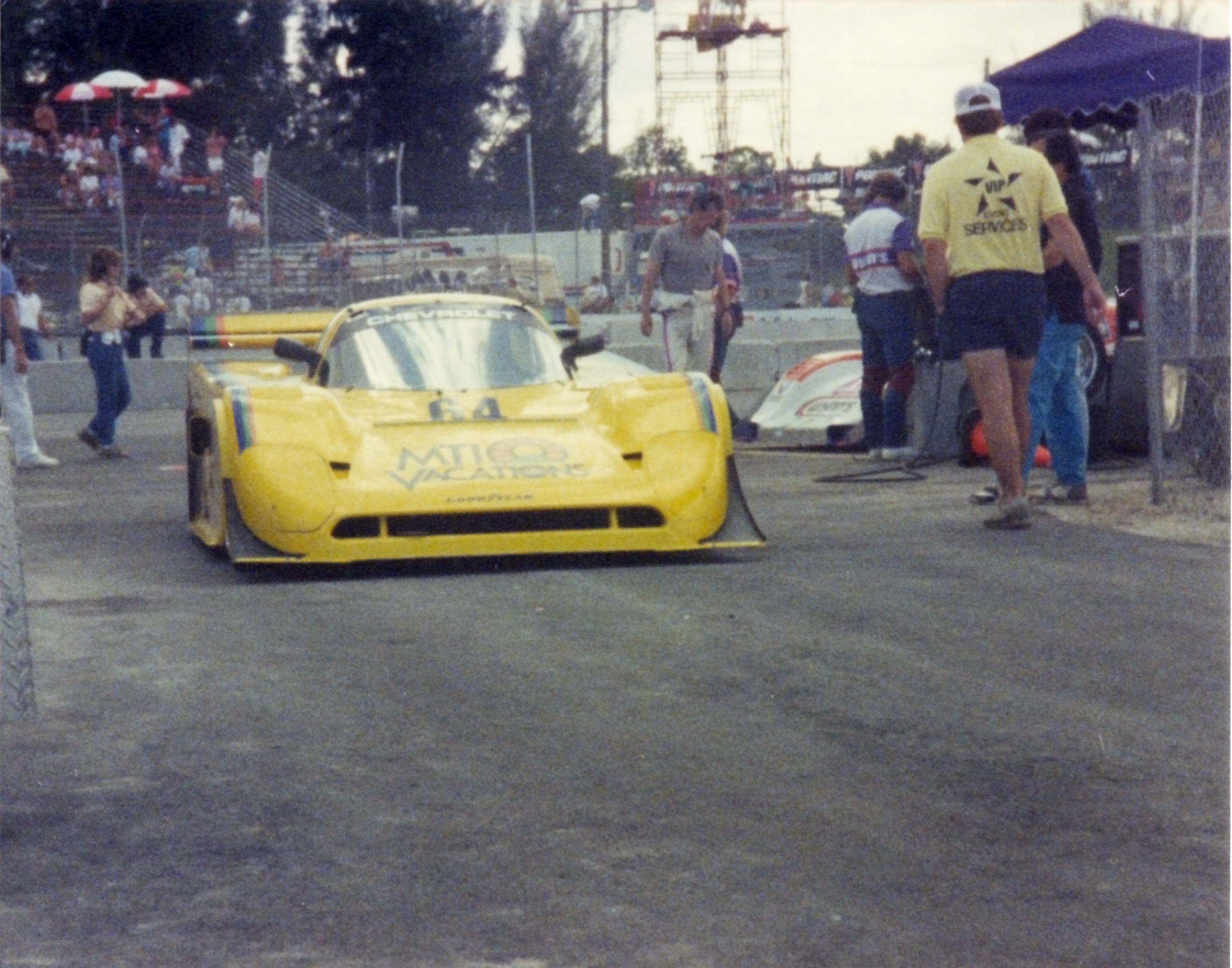
Jim Miller Racing's Spice SE89P-Chevrolet IMSA GTP car, driven by Bob Earl and Jim Miller at the 1989 West Palm Beach Grand Prix. They finished 4th in the race.

Bob Earl (born January 13, 1950) is an American former racing driver from Claremont, California. He began racing in Formula Ford in 1972 and was the 1973 national champion. In 1979, he made his professional debut in Formula Atlantic. In 1981, he became the first American to win the Macau Grand Prix, driving a modified Hayashi 320. At the time, the race was contested with Formula Atlantic cars.

Earl moved to sports cars in 1985 and drove a Pontiac Fiero for Huffaker Racing in the IMSA GTU series for two years. He moved up to the GTP cars in 1986 driving for a prototype for Spice Engineering. Earl and the Spice team earned a class victory at the 24 Hours of Daytona in 1987. He continued with Spice in GTP class in 1988, but in 1989, moved to Roush Racing's Lincoln-Mercury effort in the GTO class, capturing class honors at Daytona. He moved to the Nissan GTP factory team in 1990 and captured victories at the 12 Hours of Sebring, Miami and Watkins Glen. He stayed with Nissan until they left the series in 1993. For the 1993 season, he competed in the Camel Lights prototype class in an Acura powered Spice with two wins.

Earl retired as a competitor after the 1993 season to become a driver coach. In 1996, he was hired to start the Derek Daly Academy at Las Vegas Motor Speedway. In 2000, he returned home to the Marin County to resume freelance driver coaching. From 2002 to 2009 , Earl was the Technical Director and overlooked the Mechanics Training Program at the Jim Russell Racing School at Infineon Raceway in Sonoma California.

Earl has also developed and sells the "Virtual Racing Chassis", an advanced racing sim for use with Racing video games.

Earl continues as a freelance driver coach, lecturer on racing organization and mental training, and promotes the advantages of Alkaline Water Ionizers for improving ones health. Earl has recently moved to Humboldt County and is involved in many Environmental activities doing Restorations of Beach Dunes, Redwood Forest trails and many others. He has become an environmentalist of sorts working to address climate change.

== Racing record ==
=== SCCA National Championship Runoffs ===
Year	Track	Car	Engine	Class	Finish	Start	Status
1973	Road Atlanta	ADF	Ford	Formula Ford	1	1	Running
1974	Road Atlanta	Royale	Ford	Formula Ford	23	4	Retired

=== 24 Hours of Le Mans results ===
Year	Team	Co-drivers	Car	Class	Laps	Pos.	Class pos.
1990	(United States) Nissan Performance Technology Inc.	(New Zealand) Steve Millen (Republic of Ireland) Michael Roe	Nissan R90CK	C1	311	17th	17th

Sporting positions
Preceded by Geoff Lees	Macau Grand Prix Winner; 1981	Succeeded by Roberto Moreno
