= Spice SE89P =

Sports prototype race car

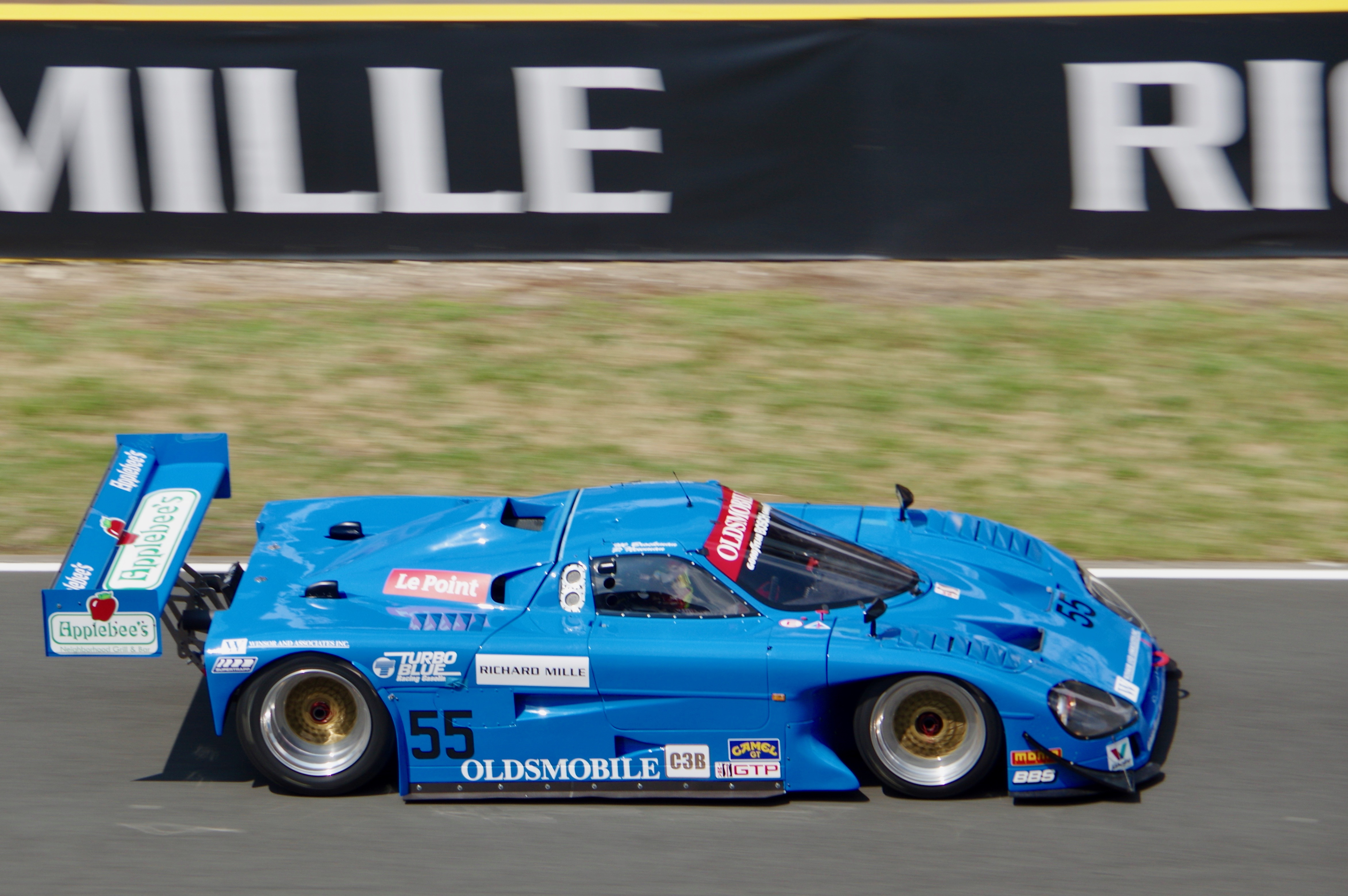
- Category: IMSA GTP
- Designer(s): Graham Humphrys
- Predecessor: Spice SE88P
- Successor: Spice SE90P

Technical specifications
- Chassis: Aluminum honeycomb monocoque covered in carbon fiber composite and kevlar body
- Suspension (front): double wishbones, coil springs over shock absorbers, anti-roll bar
- Suspension (rear): double wishbones, rocker-actuated coil springs over shock absorbers, anti-roll bar
- Engine: Pontiac/Oldsmobile/Chevrolet/Buick/Ferrari 3.0–6.5 L (183.1–396.7 cu in) V6/V8, naturally-aspirated, mid-engined
- Transmission: Hewland DCB 5-speed manual
- Power: 450–700 hp (340–520 kW)
- Tires: Goodyear

Competition history
Entries	Podiums	Poles
138	10	2

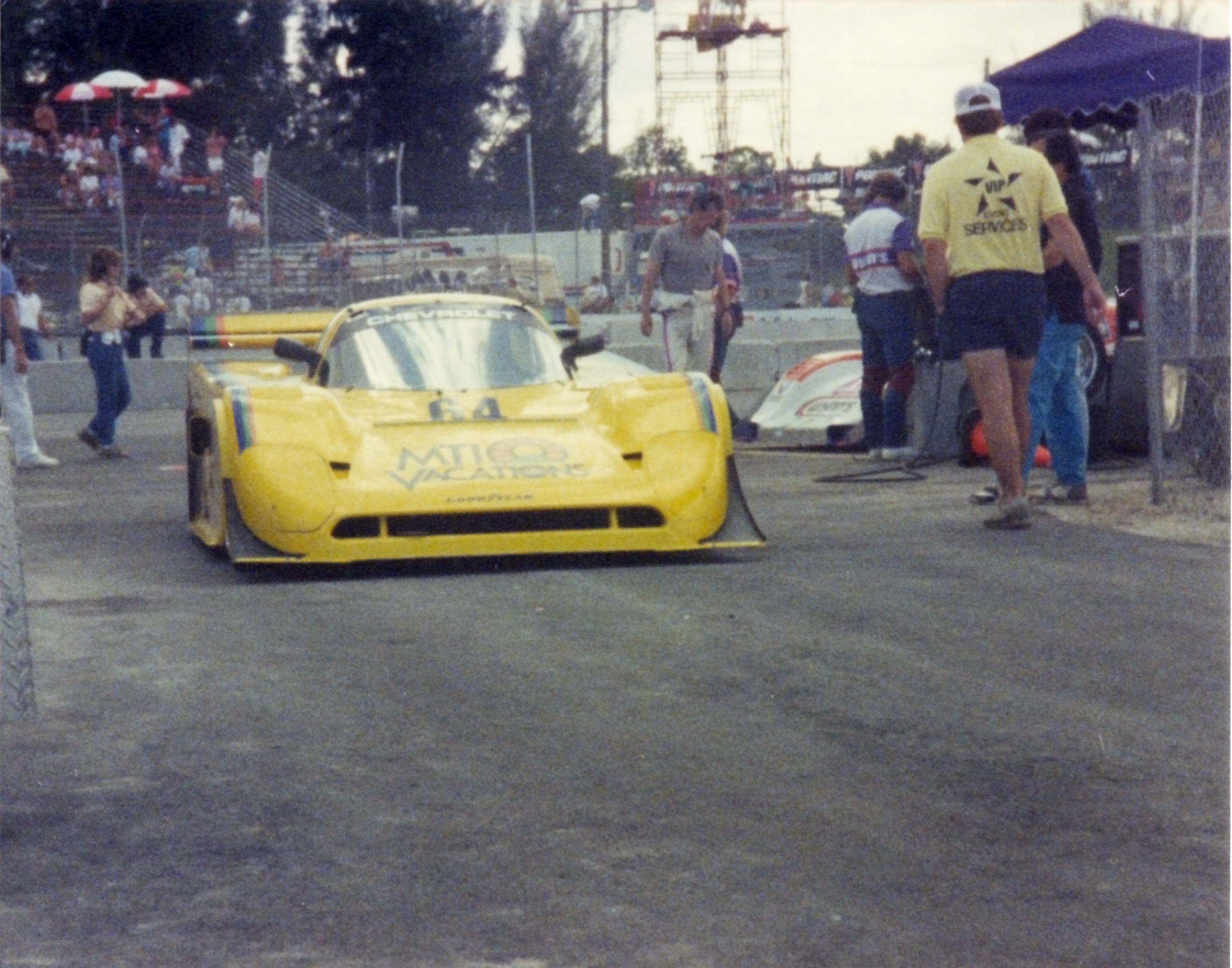
Spice SE89P Chevrolet

The Spice SE89P is an IMSA GTP sports prototype race car, designed, developed and built by British manufacturer Spice Engineering, for sports car racing in the IMSA GT Championship, in 1989.
