= 12 Hours of Sebring =

Sports car endurance race held in Sebring, Florida

IMSA WeatherTech SportsCar Championship
- Venue: Sebring International Raceway
- Corporate sponsor: Mobil 1
- First race: 1950
- Duration: 12 hours
- Most wins (driver): (Denmark) Tom Kristensen (6)
- Most wins (team): (Italy) Scuderia Ferrari/SpA Ferrari (8)
- Most wins (manufacturer): (Germany) Porsche (20)

The 12 Hours of Sebring is an annual motorsport endurance race for sports cars held at Sebring International Raceway, on the site of the former Hendricks Army Airfield World War II air base in Sebring, Florida, United States. This race was a round of the now-defunct World Sportscar Championship, IMSA GT Championship, and American Le Mans Series. In 2012, the race was the opening event of the FIA World Endurance Championship in a one-off race before being returned to the American Le Mans Series for 2013. In 2014, the event became the second round of the WeatherTech SportsCar Championship.

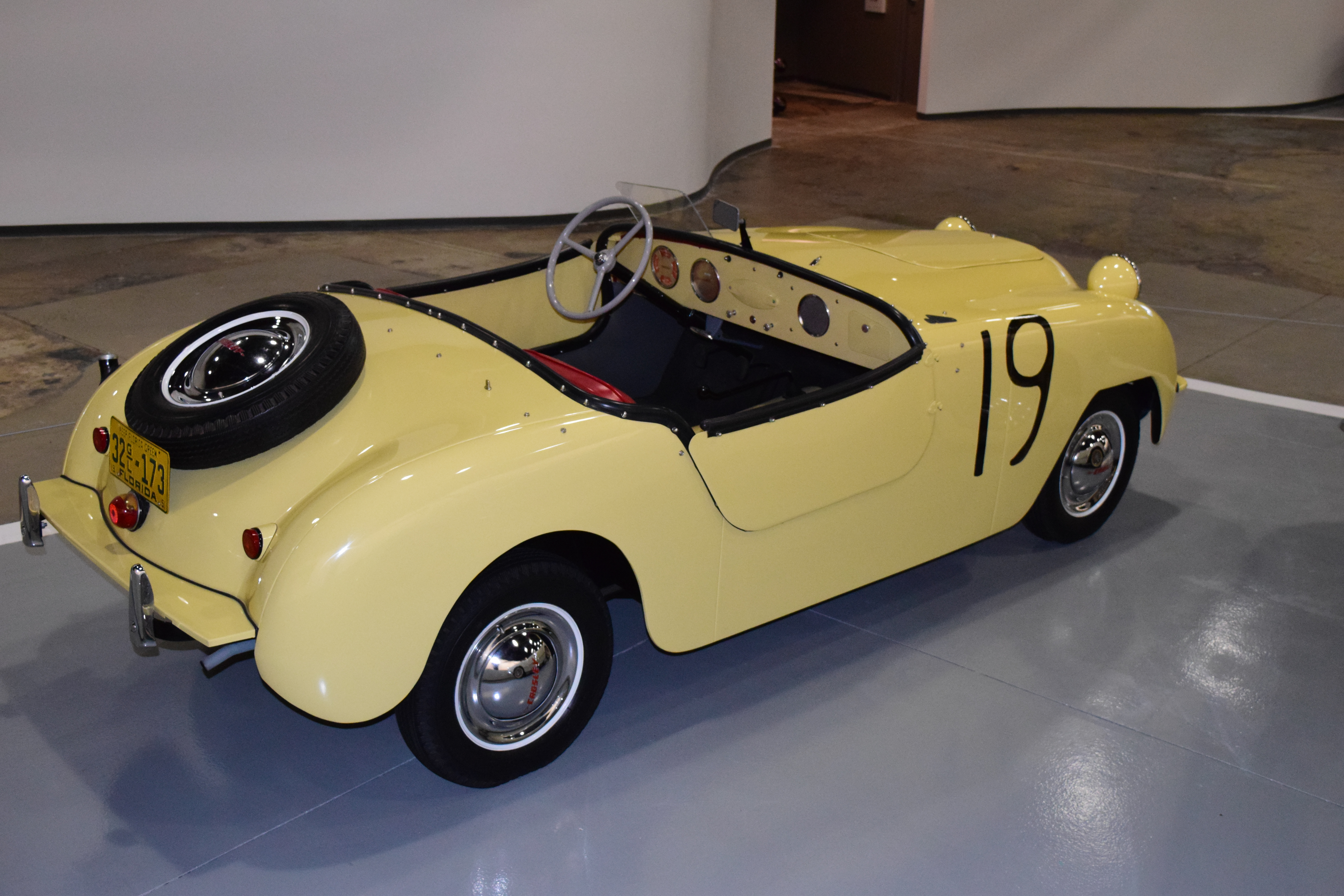
1949 Crosley Hotshot that won the 1950 Sebring Race. On display at the Edge Motor Museum in Memphis, Tennessee.

The race is a leg of the informal Triple Crown of endurance racing, along with the 24 Hours of Le Mans and 24 Hours of Daytona.

== History ==
The track opened in 1950 on an airfield and is a road racing course styled after those used in European Grand Prix motor racing. The first race was a six-hour race on New Year's Eve 1950. The winning car is currently on display at the Edge Motor Museum in Memphis, Tennessee. The next race was held 14 months later as the first 12 Hours of Sebring. The race is famous for its "once around the clock" action, starting during the day and finishing at night. From 1953 to 1972 the 12 Hour was a round of the FIA's premier sports car series which was contested under various names including the World Sportscar Championship and the International Championship for Makes. In the 1950s, in addition to Le Mans, Sebring was on the calendar at the same time now-legendary races such as the Mille Miglia, Targa Florio, Carrera Panamericana and the RAC Tourist Trophy were on the World Sportscar Championship calendar, such was the prestige of the Sebring race. It was also the most important American race for the European teams and drivers and was the center of European racing activity in the United States; it was the only time during the 1950s that the big European manufacturer teams and drivers came to the United States in force, bringing with them considerable international media attention—the United States Formula One Grand Prix was not run until 1959. Top drivers who competed on the European circuit in the 1950s such as Juan Manuel Fangio, Alberto Ascari, Nino Farina, Stirling Moss and Mike Hawthorn all raced at Sebring, and the 1957 Sebring 12 Hours was the only American race the 5-time world champion Fangio ever won.

In its early years, the Sebring circuit combined former airport runways with narrow two-lane service roads. The 1966 event was a turning point in Sebring history, as the facilities and the safety of the circuit were heavily criticized. Five people were killed during the race, more than in the race's previous 15-year history. Bob McLean crashed while approaching the hairpin; his car rolled several times, struck a utility pole and then exploded, landing in a ditch and killing him. In another incident, Mario Andretti in his Ferrari 365 P2 tangled with Don Wester's Porsche 906 on the Warehouse Straight near the Webster Turns, killing four spectators and then crashing into a warehouse next to the track. After these events, the facilities were upgraded and the circuit layout was changed to eliminate the Webster Turns and creating the Green Park Chicane further down the track to move the straight away from the airport warehouses. There have been four deaths at the track since then.

The track's technical layout and bumpy surface, combined with south-central Florida's hot weather, make it a test of a car's reliability. Many teams use Sebring as preparation for the 24 Hours of Le Mans.

In recent years, six overall victories have been achieved by the Audi R8, one fewer than the record seven wins of the Porsche 935. Tom Kristensen has won the race more times than anyone else, with six victories—in 1999–2000, 2005–2006, 2009 and in 2012.

2020 saw the race rescheduled to mid-November due to delays caused by the pandemic. It was the only season where Sebring was run twice in a season. In July, as part of restarting the season, a three-hour race was held in July with spectators. IMSA allowed spectators for this race.

Races up until 1969 began with the traditional Le Mans start procedure, which was abolished at the end of the 1969 season following Jacky Ickx protesting at Le Mans 1969; 1970 was the first 12 Hours of Sebring started with a rolling start.

== Race results ==
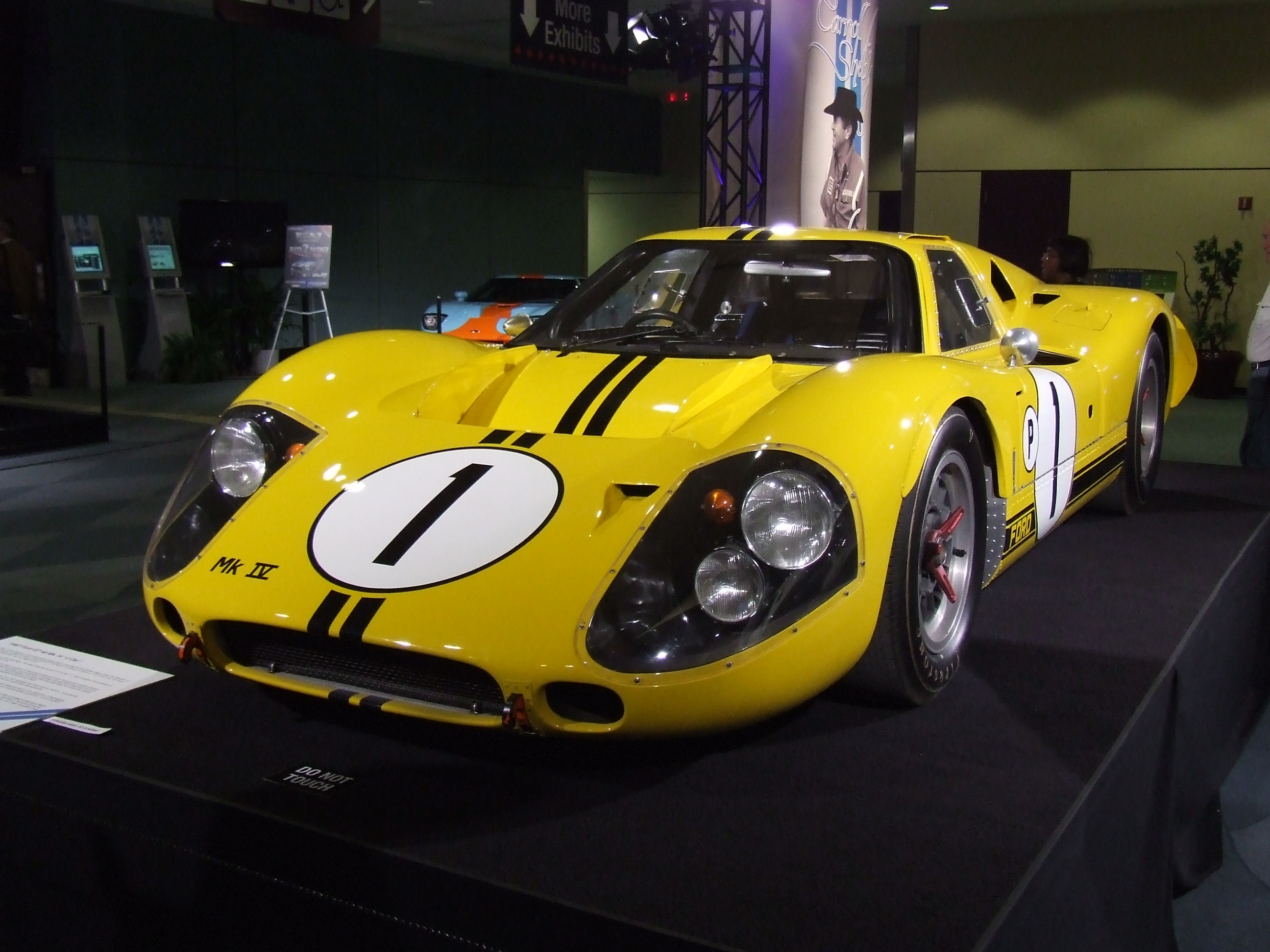
The Ford Mk IV which won the 1967 Sebring 12 Hour

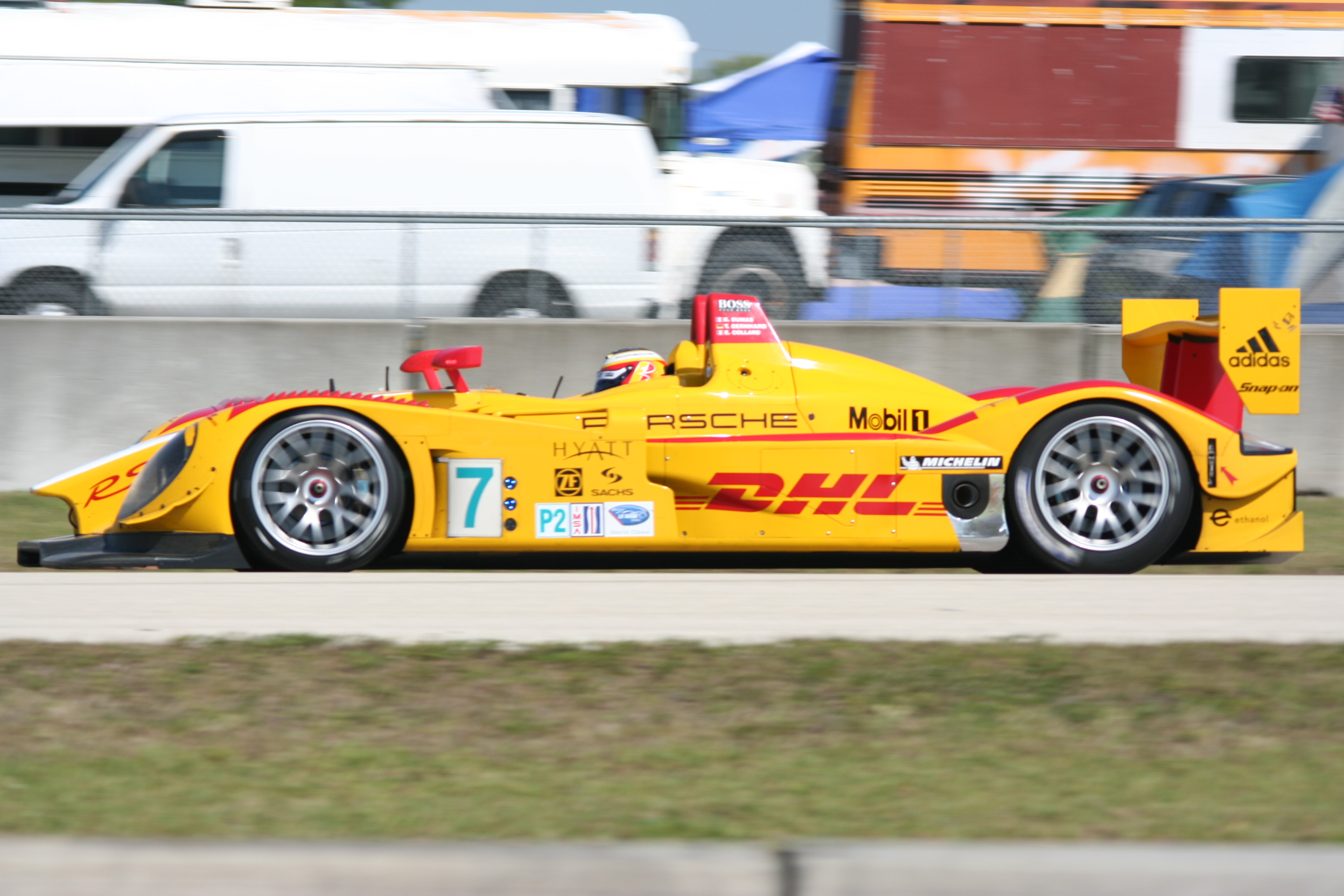
2008 overall winner Porsche RS Spyder

The 1966 race had Dan Gurney leading at the last lap, when the engine of his Shelby American Ford GT40 Mk II seized near the end. Gurney pushed his car over the finish line, beaten only by Ken Miles and Lloyd Ruby. However, his actions were ultimately determined to be against the rules and he did not receive credit for his finish.

In 2005, the Chevrolet Corvette C6.R and Aston Martin DBR9 made their race debut in the hotly contested GT1 class, with Aston Martin winning its class for the first time in 49 years at Sebring ahead of the two Corvettes. Corvette had dominated the class the past three years with its previous generation C5R.

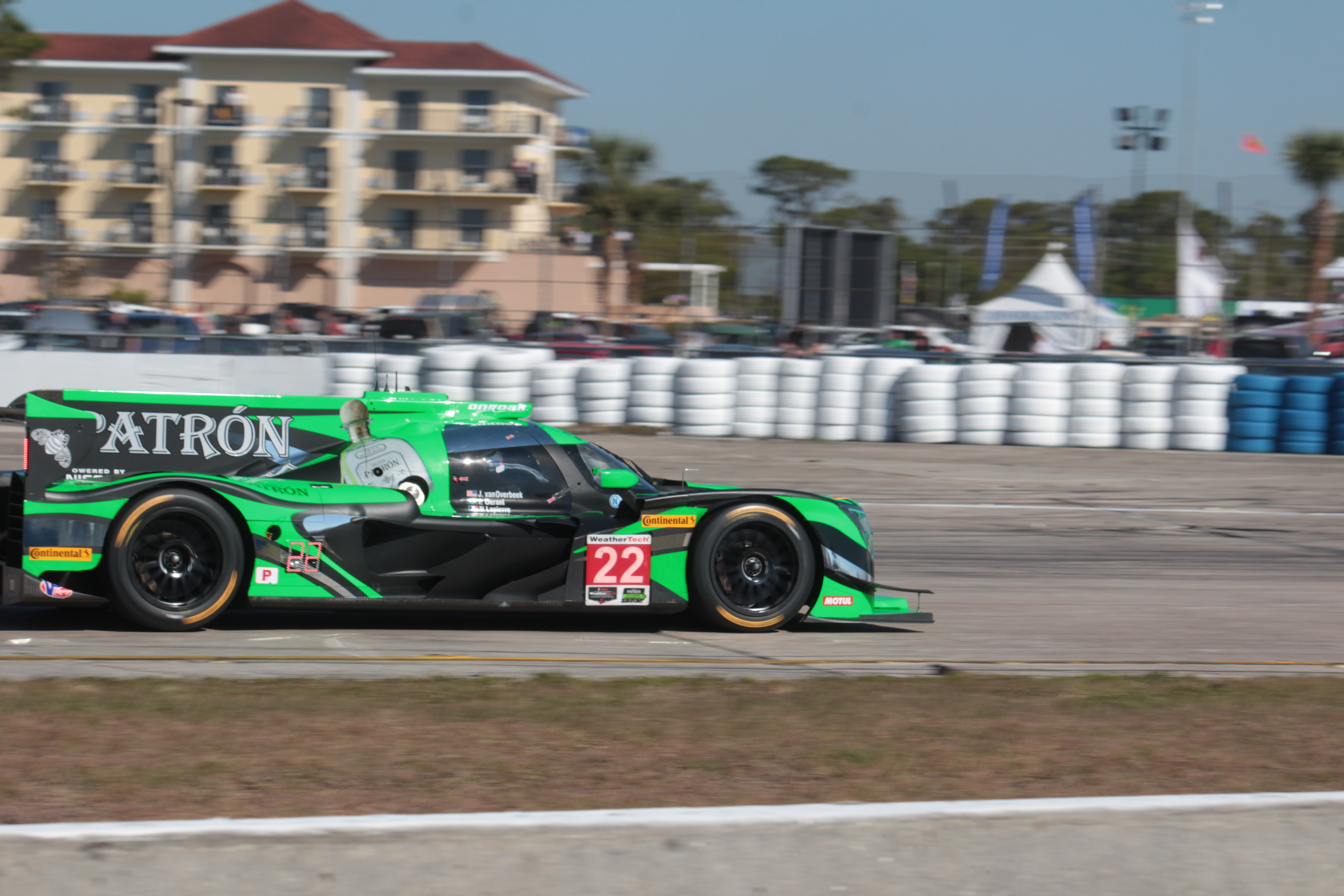
Nissan Onroak DPi No. 22, 2018 overall winner

The all-new Audi R10 TDI won the 2006 edition of the race, the car's first ever run in competition. The much-hyped Porsche RS Spyder campaigned by Penske Racing dropped to take 2nd place in its LMP2 class, behind the Intersport Lola car. The GT1 Corvette C6R team got their revenge against the Aston Martin, although the second Corvette came within 1/3 of a second of the podium in the closing laps of the race.

2007 saw Audi again winning in the R10 TDI despite requiring more frequent refueling due to changes in American Le Mans series rules intended to even the field between gasoline and diesel-powered engines.

== Statistics ==
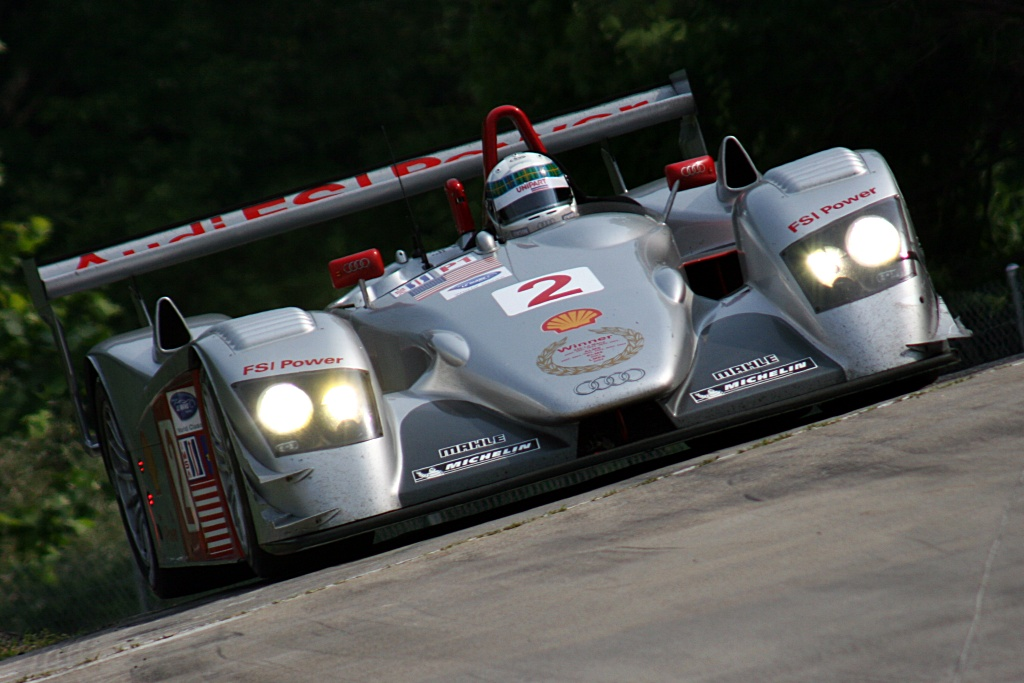
Audi R8 winner 2000–2005

=== Wins by manufacturer ===
Rank	Manufacturer	Wins	Years
1	(Germany) Porsche	20	1960, 1968, 1971, 1973, 1976–1988, 2008, 2025–2026
2	(Italy) Ferrari	12	1956, 1958–1959, 1961–1964, 1970, 1972, 1995, 1997–1998
3	(Germany) Audi	11	2000–2007, 2009, 2012–2013
4	(Japan) Nissan	5	1989–1991, 1994, 2018
4	(United States) Cadillac	5	2017, 2019, 2021–2023
6	(United States) Ford	4	1966–1967, 1969, 2014
7	(Japan) Toyota	2	1992–1993
7	(Germany) BMW	2	1975, 1999
7	(France) Peugeot	2	2010–2011
10	(United States) Crosly	1	1950
10	(United Kingdom) Frazer Nash	1	1952
10	(United States) Cunningham	1	1953
10	(Italy) O.S.C.A.	1	1954
10	(United Kingdom) Jaguar	1	1955
10	(Italy) Maserati	1	1957
10	(United States) Chaparral	1	1965
10	(United States) Oldsmobile	1	1996
10	(United States) Corvette	1	2015
10	(Japan) Honda	1	2016
10	(Japan) Mazda	1	2020
10	(Japan) Acura	1	2024

=== Wins by driver ===
Rank	Driver	Wins	Years
1	(Denmark) Tom Kristensen	6	1999, 2000, 2005, 2006, 2009, 2012
2	(Italy) Rinaldo Capello	5	2001, 2002, 2006, 2009, 2012
3	(Germany) Frank Biela	4	2000, 2003, 2004, 2007
3	(United Kingdom) Allan McNish	4	2004, 2006, 2009, 2012
3	(Brazil) Pipo Derani	4	2016, 2018, 2019, 2023
6	(United States) Phil Hill	3	1958, 1959, 1961
6	(Belgium) Olivier Gendebien	3	1959, 1960, 1961
6	(United States) Mario Andretti	3	1967, 1970, 1972
6	(West Germany) Hans-Joachim Stuck	3	1975, 1986, 1988
6	(Germany) Marco Werner	3	2003, 2005, 2007
6	(Brazil) Felipe Nasr	3	2019, 2025, 2026

=== Wins by car ===
Rank	Car	Wins	Years
1	(Germany) Porsche 935	6	1978–1982, 1984
1	(Germany) Audi R8	6	2000–2005
3	(Italy) Ferrari 250 TR	4	1958–1959, 1961–1962
3	(Germany) Porsche 962	4	1985–1988
3	(United States) Cadillac DPi-V.R	4	2017, 2019, 2021–2022
6	(United States) Ford GT40	3	1966, 1967, 1969
6	(Germany) Porsche Carrera RSR	3	1973, 1976–1977
6	(Italy) Ferrari 333 SP	3	1995, 1997–1998
9	(Japan) Nissan GTP ZX-Turbo	2	1989–1990
9	(Japan) Toyota Eagle MkIII	2	1992–1993
9	(Germany) Audi R10 TDI	2	2006–2007
9	(France) Peugeot 908 HDi FAP	2	2010–2011
9	(Germany) Audi R18	2	2012–2013
9	(Germany) Porsche 963	2	2025–2026

== Overall winners ==
Year	Drivers	Team	Car	Tires	Distance	Championship
3.3 mile/5.31 km circuit
1950 ^{D}	(United States) Fritz Koster (United States) Ralph Deshon	(United States) Victor Sharpe/Tommy Cole	Crosley HotShot		613.84 km (381.42 mi) (Sam Collier Memorial Sebring Grand Prix of Endurance Six Hours)	Non-championship
1951	Not held					
5.382 mile/8.6 km circuit
1952	(United States) Harry Gray (United States) Larry Kulok	(United States) Stuart Donaldson	Frazer Nash Le Mans Replica	D	1,213.445 km (754.000 mi)	Non-championship
1953	(United States) Phil Walters (United States) John Fitch	(United States) Briggs Cunningham	Cunningham C-4R	F	1,447.766 km (899.600 mi)	World Sportscar Championship
1954	(United States) Bill Lloyd (United Kingdom) Stirling Moss	(United States) Briggs Cunningham	O.S.C.A. MT4	P	1,405.923 km (873.600 mi)	World Sportscar Championship
1955	(United Kingdom) Mike Hawthorn (United States) Phil Walters	(United States) Briggs Cunningham	Jaguar D-Type	D	1,523.083 km (946.400 mi)	World Sportscar Championship
1956	(Italy) Eugenio Castellotti (Argentina) Juan Manuel Fangio	(Italy) Scuderia Ferrari	Ferrari 860 Monza	E	1,623.506 km (1,008.800 mi)	World Sportscar Championship
1957	(Argentina) Juan Manuel Fangio (France) Jean Behra	(Italy) Maserati	Maserati 450S	P	1,648.612 km (1,024.400 mi)	World Sportscar Championship
1958	(United Kingdom) Peter Collins (United States) Phil Hill	(Italy) Scuderia Ferrari	Ferrari 250 TR 58	E	1,673.718 km (1,040.000 mi)	World Sportscar Championship
1959	(United States) Phil Hill (United States) Dan Gurney (United States) Chuck Daigh (Belgium) Olivier Gendebien	(Italy) Scuderia Ferrari	Ferrari 250 TR 59	E	1,573.295 km (977.600 mi)	World Sportscar Championship
1960	(Belgium) Olivier Gendebien (West Germany) Hans Herrmann	(Sweden) Joakim Bonnier	Porsche RS-60	D	1,640.243 km (1,019.200 mi)	World Sportscar Championship
1961	(United States) Phil Hill (Belgium) Olivier Gendebien	(Italy) SpA Ferrari SEFAC	Ferrari 250 TRI/61	D	1,740.666 km (1,081.600 mi)	World Sportscar Championship
1962	(Belgium) Lucien Bianchi (Sweden) Joakim Bonnier	(Italy) Scuderia SSS Republica di Venezia	Ferrari 250 TRI/61	D	1,723.929 km (1,071.200 mi)	International Championship for GT Manufacturers
1963	(United Kingdom) John Surtees (Italy) Ludovico Scarfiotti	(Italy) SpA Ferrari SEFAC	Ferrari 250 P	D	1,749.035 km (1,086.800 mi)	International Championship for GT Manufacturers
1964	(United Kingdom) Mike Parkes (Italy) Umberto Maglioli	(Italy) SpA Ferrari SEFAC	Ferrari 275 P	D	1,790.878 km (1,112.800 mi)	International Championship for GT Manufacturers
1965	(United States) Jim Hall (United States) Hap Sharp	(United States) Chaparral Cars Inc.	Chaparral 2-Chevrolet	F	1,640.243 km (1,019.200 mi)	International Championship for GT Manufacturers
1966	(United States) Lloyd Ruby (United Kingdom) Ken Miles	(United States) Shelby American Inc.	Ford X-1 Roadster	G	1,908.038 km (1,185.600 mi)	International Championship for Sports-Prototypes; International Championship for Sports Cars
5.4 mile/8.66 km circuit
1967	(New Zealand) Bruce McLaren (United States) Mario Andretti	(United States) Ford Motor Company	Ford Mk IV	F	1,991.724 km (1,237.600 mi)	International Championship for Sports-Prototypes; International Championship for Sports Cars
1968	(Switzerland) Jo Siffert (West Germany) Hans Herrmann	(West Germany) Porsche Automobile Company	Porsche 907	D	1,983.356 km (1,232.400 mi)	International Championship for Makes
1969	(Belgium) Jacky Ickx (United Kingdom) Jackie Oliver	(United Kingdom) J.W. Automotive Engineering	Ford GT40 MkI	F	2,000.093 km (1,242.800 mi)	International Championship for Makes
1970	(Italy) Ignazio Giunti (Italy) Nino Vaccarella (United States) Mario Andretti	(Italy) SpA Ferrari SEFAC	Ferrari 512 S	F	2,075.410 km (1,289.600 mi)	International Championship for Makes
1971	(United Kingdom) Vic Elford (France) Gérard Larrousse	(Germany) Martini Racing	Porsche 917K	F	2,175.833 km (1,352.000 mi)	International Championship for Makes
1972	(Belgium) Jacky Ickx (United States) Mario Andretti	(Italy) SpA Ferrari SEFAC	Ferrari 312 PB	F	2,167.465 km (1,346.800 mi)	World Championship for Makes
1973	(United States) Hurley Haywood (United States) Peter Gregg (United States) Dave Helmick	(United States) Dave Helmick	Porsche Carrera RSR	G	1,891.301 km (1,175.200 mi)	IMSA GT Championship
1974	No race due to energy crisis					
1975	(West Germany) Hans-Joachim Stuck (United Kingdom) Brian Redman (Australia) Allan Moffat (United States) Sam Posey	(Germany) BMW Motorsport	BMW 3.0 CSL	D	1,991.724 km (1,237.600 mi)	IMSA GT Championship
1976	(United States) Al Holbert (United States) Mike Keyser	(United States) Holbert Porsche-Audi	Porsche Carrera RSR	G	1,924.775 km (1,196.000 mi)	IMSA GT Championship
1977	(United States) George Dyer (United States) Brad Frisselle	(United States) George Dyer	Porsche Carrera RSR	G	1,958.450 km (1,216.924 mi)	IMSA GT Championship
1978	(United Kingdom) Brian Redman (United States) Charles Mendez (United States) Bob Garretson	(United States) Dick Barbour Racing	Porsche 935	G	2,008.461 km (1,248.000 mi)	IMSA GT Championship
1979	(United States) Bob Akin (United States) Rob McFarlin (United States) Roy Woods	(United States) Dick Barbour Racing	Porsche 935	G	2,000.093 km (1,242.800 mi)	IMSA GT Championship
1980	(United Kingdom) John Fitzpatrick (United States) Dick Barbour	(United States) Dick Barbour Racing	Porsche 935 K3	G	2,117.253 km (1,315.600 mi)	IMSA GT Championship
1981	(United States) Bruce Leven (United States) Hurley Haywood (United States) Al Holbert	(United States) Bayside Disposal Racing	Porsche 935/80	G	2,050.304 km (1,274.000 mi)	IMSA GT Championship; World Endurance Championship
1982	(United States) John Paul Sr. (United States) John Paul Jr.	(United States) JLP Racing	Porsche 935 JLP-3	G	2,041.936 km (1,268.800 mi)	IMSA GT Championship
4.7 mile/7.52 km circuit
1983	(United States) Wayne Baker (United States) Jim Mullen (Canada) Kees Nierop	(United States) Personalized Autohaus	Porsche 934^{A}	F	1,765.853 km (1,097.250 mi)	IMSA GT Championship
1984	(Colombia) Mauricio de Narvaez (West Germany) Hans Heyer (Sweden) Stefan Johansson	(Colombia) De Narvaez Enterprises	Porsche 935J	G	2,057.031 km (1,278.180 mi)	IMSA GT Championship
1985	(France) Bob Wollek (United States) A. J. Foyt	(United States) Preston Henn	Porsche 962	G	2,197.817 km (1,365.660 mi)	IMSA GT Championship
1986	(United States) Bob Akin (West Germany) Hans-Joachim Stuck (Austria) Jo Gartner	(United States) Bob Akin Motor Racing	Porsche 962	Y	2,244.745 km (1,394.820 mi)	IMSA GT Championship
4.2 mile/6.85 km circuit
1987	(United States) Bobby Rahal (West Germany) Jochen Mass	(United States) Bayside Disposal Racing	Porsche 962	G	1,971.092 km (1,224.780 mi)	IMSA GT Championship
1988	(West Germany) Klaus Ludwig (West Germany) Hans-Joachim Stuck	(United States) Bayside Disposal Racing	Porsche 962	G	2,103.380 km (1,306.980 mi)	IMSA GT Championship
1989	(Australia) Geoff Brabham (Netherlands) Arie Luyendyk (United States) Chip Robinson	(United States) Electramotive Engineering	Nissan GTP ZX-Turbo	G	2,182.753 km (1,356.300 mi)	IMSA GT Championship
1990	(United States) Bob Earl (Republic of Ireland) Derek Daly	(United States) Nissan Performance Technology	Nissan GTP ZX-Turbo	G	1,990.936 km (1,237.110 mi)	IMSA GT Championship
3.72 mile/5.99 km circuit
1991	(Republic of Ireland) Derek Daly (Australia) Geoff Brabham (Australia) Gary Brabham	(United States) Nissan Performance Technology	Nissan NPT-90	G	1,774.463 km (1,102.600 mi)	IMSA GT Championship
1992	(Argentina) Juan Manuel Fangio II (United Kingdom) Andy Wallace	(United States) All American Racers	Eagle MkIII-Toyota	G	2,143.646 km (1,332.000 mi)	IMSA GT Championship
1993	(Argentina) Juan Manuel Fangio II (United Kingdom) Andy Wallace	(United States) All American Racers	Eagle MkIII-Toyota	G	1,369.552 km (851.000 mi)^{B}	IMSA GT Championship
1994	(New Zealand) Steve Millen (United States) Johnny O'Connell (United States) John Morton	(United States) Clayton Cunningham Racing	Nissan 300ZX	Y	1,947.145 km (1,209.900 mi)	IMSA Exxon World Sportscar Championship
1995	(United States) Andy Evans (Spain) Fermín Vélez (Belgium) Eric van de Poele	(United States) Scandia Motorsports	Ferrari 333 SP	P	1,548.189 km (962.000 mi)^{B}	IMSA Exxon World Sportscar Championship
1996	(South Africa) Wayne Taylor (United States) Jim Pace (Belgium) Eric van de Poele	(United States) Doyle Racing	Riley & Scott Mk III-Oldsmobile	P	1,935.075 km (1,202.400 mi)	IMSA Exxon World Sportscar Championship
1997	(United States) Andy Evans (Spain) Fermín Vélez (France) Yannick Dalmas (Sweden) Stefan Johansson	(United States) Team Scandia	Ferrari 333 SP	G	1,628.012 km (1,011.600 mi)^{B}	Professional Sports Car Exxon World Sportscar Championship
1998	(Belgium) Didier Theys (Italy) Gianpiero Moretti (Italy) Mauro Baldi	(United States) MOMO Doran Racing	Ferrari 333 SP	Y	1,925.178 km (1,196.250 mi)	Professional Sportscar Exxon World Sportscar Championship
3.74 mile/6.02 km circuit
1999	(Denmark) Tom Kristensen (Finland) JJ Lehto (Germany) Jörg Müller	(Germany) BMW Motorsport	BMW V12 LMR	M	1,863.781 km (1,158.100 mi)	American Le Mans Series
2000	(Germany) Frank Biela (Denmark) Tom Kristensen (Italy) Emanuele Pirro	(Germany) Audi Sport North America	Audi R8	M	2,143.646 km (1,332.000 mi)	American Le Mans Series
2001	(Italy) Rinaldo Capello (Italy) Michele Alboreto (France) Laurent Aïello	(Germany) Audi Sport North America	Audi R8	M	2,203.192 km (1,369.000 mi)	American Le Mans Series; European Le Mans Series
2002	(Italy) Rinaldo Capello (Italy) Christian Pescatori (United Kingdom) Johnny Herbert	(Germany) Audi Sport North America	Audi R8	M	2,060.282 km (1,280.200 mi)	American Le Mans Series
2003	(Austria) Philipp Peter (Germany) Frank Biela (Germany) Marco Werner	(Germany) Infineon Team Joest	Audi R8	M	2,185.328 km (1,357.900 mi)	American Le Mans Series
2004	(United Kingdom) Allan McNish (Germany) Frank Biela (Germany) Pierre Kaffer	(United Kingdom) Audi Sport UK Team Veloqx	Audi R8	M	2,084.101 km (1,295.000 mi)	American Le Mans Series
2005	(Germany) Marco Werner (Finland) JJ Lehto (Denmark) Tom Kristensen	(United States) ADT Champion Racing	Audi R8	M	2,149.601 km (1,335.700 mi)	American Le Mans Series
2006	(Denmark) Tom Kristensen (United Kingdom) Allan McNish (Italy) Rinaldo Capello	(United States) Audi Sport North America	Audi R10 TDI (Diesel)	M	2,078.145 km (1,291.299 mi)	American Le Mans Series
2007	(Italy) Emanuele Pirro (Germany) Frank Biela (Germany) Marco Werner	(United States) Audi Sport North America	Audi R10 TDI (Diesel)	M	2,165.8 km (1,345.8 mi)	American Le Mans Series
2008	(Germany) Timo Bernhard (France) Romain Dumas (France) Emmanuel Collard	(United States) Penske Racing	Porsche RS Spyder Evo	M	2,088.45 km (1,297.70 mi)	American Le Mans Series
2009	(Denmark) Tom Kristensen (Italy) Rinaldo Capello (United Kingdom) Allan McNish	(Germany) Audi Sport Team Joest	Audi R15 TDI (Diesel)	M	2,278.85 km (1,416.01 mi)^{C}	American Le Mans Series
2010	(United Kingdom) Anthony Davidson (Spain) Marc Gené (Austria) Alexander Wurz	(France) Team Peugeot Total	Peugeot 908 HDi FAP (Diesel)	M	2,185.328 km (1,357.900 mi)	American Le Mans Series
2011	(France) Loïc Duval (France) Nicolas Lapierre (France) Olivier Panis	(France) Team Oreca Matmut	Peugeot 908 HDi FAP (Diesel)	M	1,975.4 km (1,227.5 mi)	American Le Mans Series; Intercontinental Le Mans Cup
2012	(Denmark) Tom Kristensen (Italy) Rinaldo Capello (United Kingdom) Allan McNish	(Germany) Audi Sport Team Joest	Audi R18 TDI (Diesel)	M	1,933.8 km (1,201.6 mi)	FIA World Endurance Championship; American Le Mans Series
2013	(Switzerland) Marcel Fässler (France) Benoît Tréluyer (United Kingdom) Oliver Jarvis	(Germany) Audi Sport Team Joest	Audi R18 e-tron quattro (hybrid diesel)	M	2,191.3 km (1,361.6 mi)	American Le Mans Series
2014	(United Kingdom) Marino Franchitti (United States) Scott Pruett (Mexico) Memo Rojas	(United States) Chip Ganassi Racing	Riley Mk XXVI-Ford Ecoboost	C	1,751.1 km (1,088.1 mi)	United SportsCar Championship
2015	(France) Sébastien Bourdais (Portugal) João Barbosa (Brazil) Christian Fittipaldi	(United States) Action Express Racing	Coyote-Corvette DP	C	2,046.4 km (1,271.6 mi)	United SportsCar Championship
2016	(Brazil) Pipo Derani (United States) Scott Sharp (United States) Ed Brown (United States) Johannes van Overbeek	(United States) Tequila Patrón ESM	Ligier JS P2-Honda	C	1,432.51 km (890.12 mi)^{B}	IMSA SportsCar Championship
2017	(United Kingdom) Alex Lynn (United States) Ricky Taylor (United States) Jordan Taylor	(United States) Wayne Taylor Racing	Cadillac DPi-V.R	C	2,094.59 km (1,301.52 mi)	IMSA SportsCar Championship
2018	(United States) Johannes van Overbeek (France) Nicolas Lapierre (Brazil) Pipo Derani	(United States) Tequila Patrón ESM	Nissan Onroak DPi	C	2,070.88 km (1,286.79 mi)	IMSA SportsCar Championship
2019	(Brazil) Felipe Nasr (Brazil) Pipo Derani (United States) Eric Curran	(United States) Whelen Engineering Racing	Cadillac DPi-V.R	M	2,094.96 km (1,301.75 mi)	IMSA SportsCar Championship
2020	(United States) Jonathan Bomarito (United States) Ryan Hunter-Reay (United Kingdom) Harry Tincknell	(Canada) Mazda Motorsports	Mazda RT24-P	M	2,094.96 km (1,301.75 mi)	IMSA SportsCar Championship
2021	(France) Sébastien Bourdais (France) Loïc Duval (France) Tristan Vautier	(United States) JDC-Mustang Sampling Racing	Cadillac DPi-V.R	M	2,100.98 km (1,305.49 mi)	IMSA SportsCar Championship
2022	(New Zealand) Earl Bamber (Switzerland) Neel Jani (United Kingdom) Alex Lynn	(United States) Cadillac Racing	Cadillac DPi-V.R	M	2,113.02 km (1,312.97 mi)	IMSA SportsCar Championship
2023	(United Kingdom) Jack Aitken (Brazil) Pipo Derani (United Kingdom) Alexander Sims	(United States) Whelen Engineering Racing	Cadillac V-Series.R	M	1,938.62 km (1,204.60 mi)	IMSA SportsCar Championship
2024	(Switzerland) Louis Delétraz (United States) Colton Herta (United States) Jordan Taylor	(United States) Wayne Taylor Racing with Andretti	Acura ARX-06	M	2,004.33 km (1,245.43 mi)	IMSA SportsCar Championship
2025	(Brazil) Felipe Nasr (United Kingdom) Nick Tandy (Belgium) Laurens Vanthoor	(Germany) Porsche Penske Motorsport	Porsche 963	M	2,124.70 km (1,320.23 mi)	IMSA SportsCar Championship
2026	(France) Julien Andlauer (Germany) Laurin Heinrich (Brazil) Felipe Nasr	(Germany) Porsche Penske Motorsport	Porsche 963	M	2,064.52 km (1,282.83 mi)	IMSA SportsCar Championship

^A The car was in fact, a Porsche 935 K3 that has been modified with a single plug cylinder head and a front nose to resemble a Porsche 934 to comply to IMSA GTO specification.
^B These races were stopped for a period of time due to heavy rain and/or accidents. The race clock was not stopped for these periods and counted towards the 12 Hours.
^C Race record for most distance covered.
^D Technically the race "winner" in 1950 was the Crosley Hot Shot of Fritz Koster / Ralph Deshon, entered by Victor Sharpe Jr. of Tampa. While the Wacker / Burrell Allard did cover more distance, the race was run under the "Index of Performance" handicapping rules and the Crosley, with a much smaller engine than the Cadillac-powered Allard, is listed in the Official Sebring Record Book as the winner.

== See also ==
- Petit Le Mans
