= John Graves (racing driver) =

American racing driver

John Graves is an American former racing driver from Miami, Florida.

Graves won the 1977 24 Hours of Daytona teaming with owner-driver Dave Helmick and Porsche factory driver Hurley Haywood in a two-year-old Porsche Carrera RSR entered as "Ecurie Escargot". Graves drove in a number of other high-profile sports car races of the era including the 12 Hours of Sebring, usually teaming with Helmick.
