= Edge Motor Museum =

Automobile museum in Tennessee, US

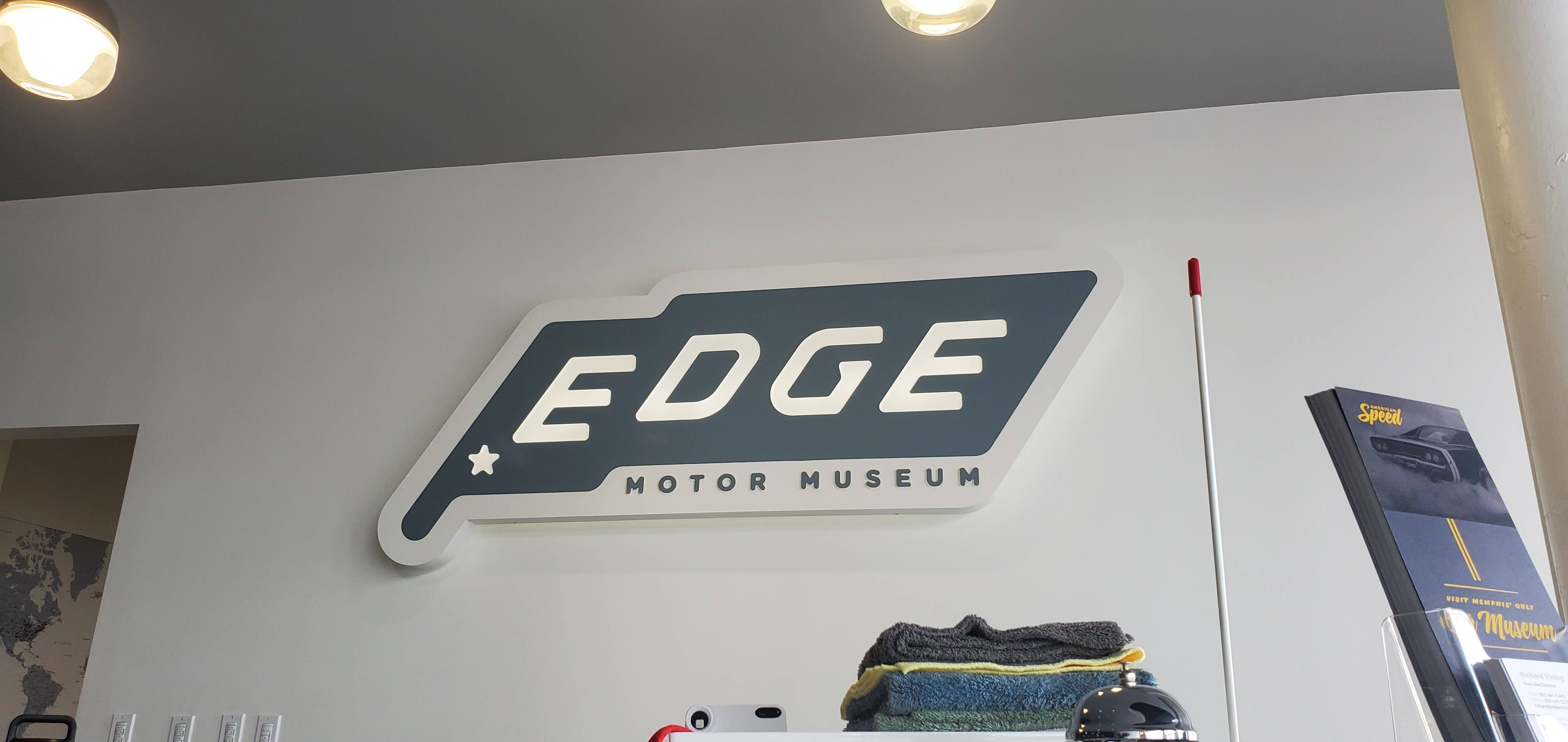

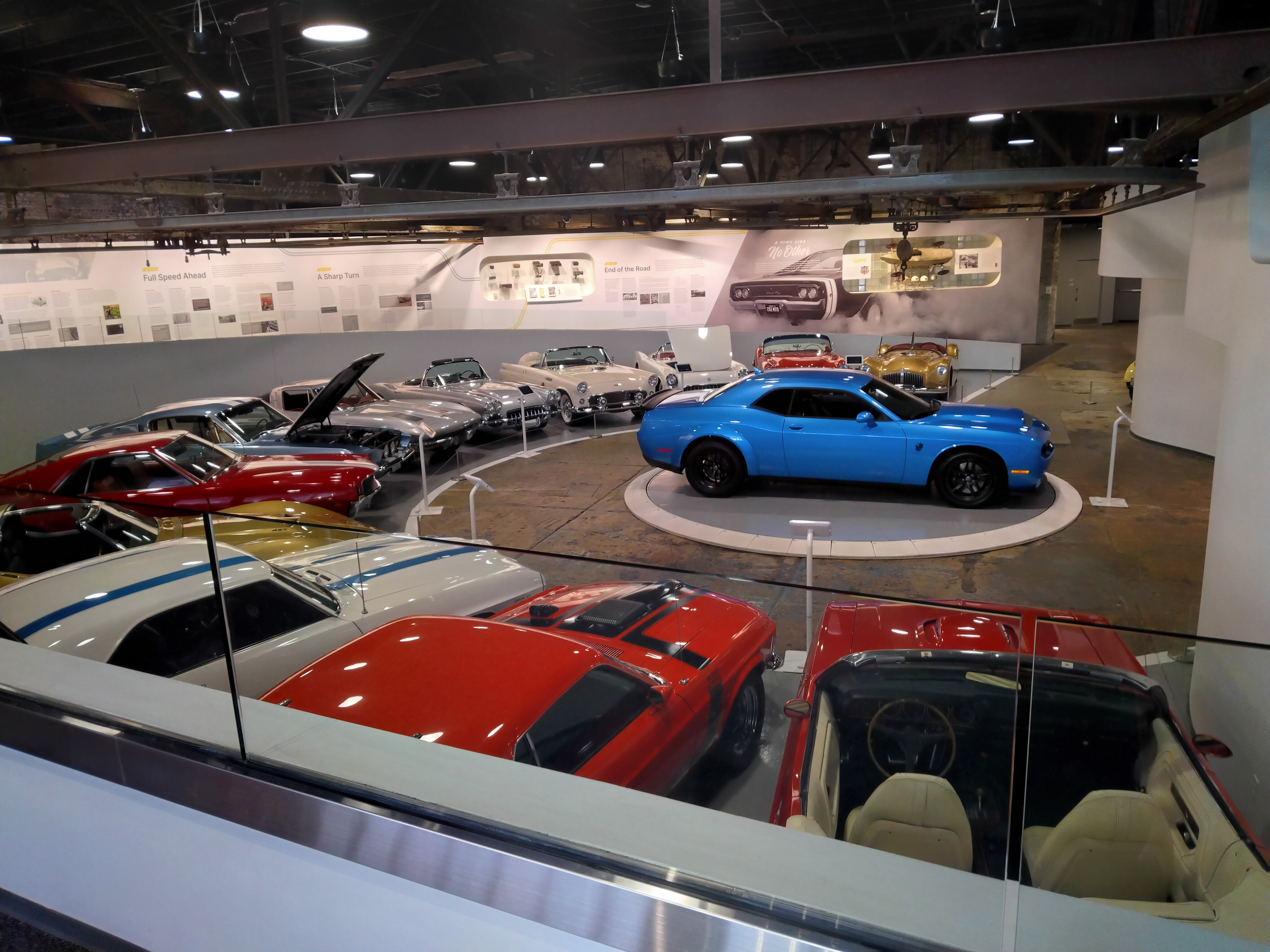
- The Edge Motor Museum in July 2024

- Location within Tennessee
- Established: November 2, 2019
- Location: 645 Marshall Avenue, Memphis Tennessee, US
- Coordinates: 35.140182°N 90.039566°W
- Type: Automobile museum
- Collection size: 20–25
- Visitors: 15,000 (2024)
- Curator: Bob Watkins
- Owner: Richard Vining
- Parking: On site (no charge)
- Website: www.edgemotormuseum.com

The Edge Motor Museum is an automobile museum located in Memphis, Tennessee. It holds a rotating display of around 20–25 vehicles.

== Museum ==
The museum was established as a non-profit 501(c)(3) organization in 2018 by Richard Vining, beginning with a small collection of vehicles in the building once owned by Cherokee Motors. The building was most recently occupied by St. Blues Guitar Workshop. The museum mainly features American sports cars from the 1950s to the 1970s. More specifically, this refers to the period of economic growth following the second world war. When the United States experienced a drastic increase in manufacturing. Its ultimate end would come during the 1973 oil crisis. Its namesake is derived from the Edge district in which it is located, which also encompasses Sun Studio.

The museum has featured a number of unique vehicles including, Doris Day's Muntz Jet, a 1949 Crosley Hotshot (the first car to win 12 hours of Sebring), a Glasspar G2, and a 1962 Shark Roadster. However, the museum typically focuses on the evolution of American sports cars.

The museum does not own any of the vehicles on display, they are on loan from collections like Greenbrier Classic Cars and Cofer's Classics. Many vehicles are on loan from private collectors closely associated with the museum. The museum has a rotating display of vehicles which change every few months.

== Layout ==
The museum layout features a small number of vehicles located in the lobby area, around 5. This area is open to the public and admission is free. Down the ramp and into the main exhibit there is a semicircle of vehicles arranged in chronological order. "Post war to '74" is the motto adopted by the museum. The wall along the ramp features a graphic which describes the 'rise and fall of the American sports car'. At the outlet of the semicircle is a small exhibit that features a comparison of the Chevrolet Corvette and the Ford Thunderbird. At the back of the museum is a garage area which features two vehicles, as well as a photo area with license plates.

== Events ==
The museum hosts 'Cars & Coffee' on the second Saturday of each months as well as hosting two large annual car shows throughout the year. One occurring in the spring, and one in the fall. In addition these two annual events are aimed at bringing in car enthusiasts from around the city. Participants are allowed to enter their vehicles, from any time period, to win different awards.
