= 1976 12 Hours of Sebring =

Sports car endurance race

The Sebring 76 Twelve Hours of Endurance, was the second round of the 1976 IMSA GT Championship. The race was held at the Sebring International Raceway, on March 20, 1976. Victory overall went to the No. 14 G. W. Dickinson/Holbert Porsche-Audi Porsche 911 Carrera RSR driven by Al Holbert and Michael Keyser.

== Race results ==
Class winners in bold.

Pos	Class	No	Team	Drivers	Car	Laps
1	**GTO**	**14**	**(United States) G. W. Dickinson/Holbert Porsche-Audi**	**(United States) Al Holbert (United States) Michael Keyser**	**Porsche 911 Carrera RSR**	**230**
2	GTO	11	(United States) Dallas Heyser/SL-1	(United States) John Oliver Gunn Jr. (United States) Carson Baird	Porsche 911 Carrera RSR	228
3	GTO	30	(United States) John McClelland	(Mexico) Roberto Quintanilla (Mexico) Roberto Gonzalez	Porsche 911 Carrera RSR	227
4	GTO	56	(United States) Spirit of Colorado/Hagestad Porsche	(United States) Bob Hagestad (United States) Jerry Jolly	Porsche 911 Carrera RSR	224
5	GTO	58	(Puerto Rico) Diego Febles Racing	(Puerto Rico) Diego Febles (United States) Hiram Cruz	Porsche 911 Carrera RSR	222
6	GTO	44	(Colombia) Mauricio de Narváez	(Colombia) Mauricio de Narváez (United States) Albert Naon (United States) John Freyre	Porsche 911 Carrera RSR	221
7	GTO	59	(United States) BMW Motorsport North America	(United States) Peter Gregg (United States) Hurley Haywood	BMW 3.0 CSL	217
8	GTO	61	(United States) Brumos Porsche-Audi	(United States) Jim Busby (United States) Carl Shafer	Porsche 911 Carrera RSR	210
9	**GTU**	**67**	**(United States) Havatampa Cigar**	**(United States) Dave White (United States) David McClain**	**Porsche 911 Carrera S**	**209**
10	GTO	92	(United States) Oest-Tillson Racing	(United States) Dieter Oest (United States) Mike Tillson	Porsche 911 Carrera RSR	208
11	GTO	91	(Mexico) Adams Apple	(Mexico) Juan Carlos Bolaños (United States) Billy Sprowls (Mexico) Eduardo Lopez Negrete	Porsche 911 Carrera RSR	206
12	GTU	07	(United States) Charles Mendez Jr.	(United States) Charles Mendez (United States) Dave Cowart	Porsche 911T	206
13	GTU	50	(Canada) Motex Auto	(Canada) Fritz Hochreuter (Canada) Willy Goebbels (Canada) Hans Berner	Porsche 911S	200
14	GTU	51	(United States) Max Dial Porsche-Audi	(United States) Robert Kirby (United States) John Hotchkis (United States) Len Jones	Porsche 914-6 GT	198
15 DNF	GTU	77	(United States) Bruce Jennings	(United States) Bruce Jennings (United States) Bob Beasley	Porsche 911S	195
16	GTO	06	(United States) Chitwood Racing	(United States) Tim Chitwood (United States) Vince Gimondo	Chevrolet Camaro	191
17	GTU	45	(El Salvador) Carlos Moran	(El Salvador) Carlos Moran (United States) Bob Fine (El Salvador) "Jamsal"	Porsche 911S	185
18	GTO	7	(United States) Team Sebring Racing	(United States) Bob Gray (United States) Terry Keller	Chevrolet Corvette	185
19 DNF	GTO	72	(United States) Bill Arnold	(United States) Bill Arnold (United States) Carl Thompson	Chevrolet Corvette	182
20	GTO	78	(Puerto Rico) Ignacio Gonzalez	(United States) Luis Sereix (Puerto Rico) Ignacio Gonzalez (United States) Gus Robayna	Chevrolet Camaro	178
21	GTO	86	(United States) Hugh Kleinpeter	(United States) Hugh Kleinpeter (United States) Ron Goldleaf	De Tomaso Pantera	176
22	GTU	87	(United States) R. Mandella	(United States) John Thomas (United States) Jim Cook	Porsche 914-6 GT	174
23	GTO	52	(United States) Starbrite	(United States) John Tunstall (United States) Chuck Wade	Porsche 911 Carrera RSR	173
24	GTU	27	(United States) Jack Refenning	(United States) Ray Mummery (United States) Jack Refenning (United States) George Van Arsdale	Porsche 911S	170
25	GTU	90	(United States) Ray Walle Mazda	(United States) Tom Reddy (United States) Tom Davey	Mazda Cosmo	168
26	GTU	8	(United States) Automobiles International	(United States) Anatoly Arutnoff (United States) Jose Marina (United States) Jack May	Lotus Europa	162
27	GTU	3	(United States) Bart Hartmann	(United States) Bart Hartmann (United States) Mark Domiteaux (United States) Donald Flores (United States) Tom Turner	Austin Marina	159
28	GTU	38	(United States) Paul Spruell	(United States) Paul Spruell (United States) Walter Johnston (United States) Jan Petersen	Alfa Romeo Alfetta GT	158
29	GTO	15	(United States) Garcia Brothers Racing	(United States) Javier Garcia (United States) George Garcia	Chevrolet Corvette	157
30	GTU	5	(United States) Richard Weiss	(United States) Raymond Gage (United States) John Emig (United States) Pedro Velasquez Jr.	Porsche 911S	150
31 DNF	GTO	19	(United States) Richard Boystan	(United States) Jerry Thompson (United States) Richard Bostyan (United States) Don Yenko	Chevrolet Corvette	144
32	GTU	54	(United States) Spirit Racing	(United States) Hal Sahlman (United States) Steve Southard (United States) Alex Job	Porsche 914-6 GT	141
33	GTO	81	(United States) Dave Smith	(United States) Dave Smith (United States) Don Herman	Chevrolet Corvette	139
34	GTO	82	(United States) Tom Ross	(United States) Tom Ross (United States) Jim Weber	Ford Mustang	138
35 DNF	GTU	99	(United States) George Shafer	(United States) George Shafer (United States) Al Crookston (United States) Dick Scott	Datsun 240Z	129
36 DNF	GTU	03	(Germany) Bavarian Motors	(United States) Alf Gebhardt (United States) Sepp Grinbold (Germany) Bruno Beilcke	BMW 2002	126
37	GTO	41	(United States) Jones Industries Racing	(United States) Herb Jones Jr. (United States) Steve Faul	Chevrolet Camaro	113
38 DNF	GTO	49	(United States) Neil Potter	(United States) Neil Potter (United States) William Boyer	Ford Mustang	112
39 DNF	GTU	55	(United States) Charles Kleinschmidt	(United States) Charles Kleinschmidt (United States) Jack Andrus	MGB GT	110
40 DNF	GTU	34	(United States) George Drolsom	(United States) George Drolsom (United States) Bob Nagel	Porsche 911S	106
41 DNF	GTO	43	(United States) Ecurie Escargot	(United States) John O'Steen (United States) Dave Helmick	Porsche 911 Carrera RSR	102
42 DNF	GTU	64	(United States) Miller & Norburn	(United States) Nick Craw (United States) John Morton (United States) Joe Peacock	BMW 2002 TI	102
43	GTU	31	(Colombia) Juan Montalvo	(Colombia) Juan Montalvo (United States) Jim Grob	Ford Escort	102
44 DNF	GTU	22	(United States) Tony Lilly	(United States) Tony Lilly (United States) Frank Marrs	Lotus Europa	97
45 DNF	GTO	47	(United States) Clay Young	(United States) Eddie Johnson (United States) Clay Young (United States) Gene Felton	Chevrolet Camaro	96
46 DNF	GTU	08	(United States) Stiles Construction	(United States) Ron Oyler (United States) Ken Braun (United States) Guy Church	Renault 12	91
47 DNF	GTO	24	(United States) BMW Motorsport North America	(United Kingdom) David Hobbs (United States) Benny Parsons	BMW 3.0 CSL	90
48 DNF	GTO	68	(United States) Mike Meldeau	(United States) Mike Meldeau (United States) Bill McDill	Chevrolet Camaro	79
49 DNF	GTO	21	(United States) Richard Stone	(United States) Richard Stone (United States) Greg Gillingham (United States) Frank Fine	Shelby GT350	78
50 DNF	GTU	42	(United States) Bob Hindson Racing	(United States) Bob Hindson (United States) Frank Carney (United States) Dick Davenport	Porsche 911S	77
51 DNF	GTO	96	(United States) Mike Williamson	(United States) Mike Williamson (United States) Lawrence P. Pleasants (United States) Charles Gano	Chevrolet Camaro	74
52 DNF	GTO	97	(United States) Jim Alspaugh	(United States) James Alspaugh (United States) Bill McVey	Chevrolet Corvette C3	64
53 DNF	GTO	05	(United States) Red Roof Inns/Jim Trueman	(United States) Jim Trueman (United States) Bobby Rahal	Chevrolet Monza	63
54 DNF	GTO	12	(United States) Paul Bowden Racing	(United States) Ford Smith (United States) Bennett Aitken	Chevrolet Camaro	62
55 DNF	GTU	60	(United States) Rusty Bond	(United States) Rusty Bond (United States) Ren Tilton	Porsche 911S	58
56 DNF	GTU	02	(United States) Bill Scott	(United States) Bill Scott (United States) Milt Minter	Volkswagen Scirocco	54
57 DNF	GTO	29	(United States) Hoyt Overbagh	(United States) Bud Wamsley (United States) Guy Thomas	Chevrolet Corvette	51
58 DNF	GTO	46	(United States) Ahmed Valhuerdi	(United States) Manuel Quintana (Dominican Republic) Luis Mendez (United States) Ahmed Valhuerdi	Shelby GT350	50
59 DNF	GTO	73	(United States) Howey Farms	(United States) David Crabtree (United States) Clark Howey	Chevrolet Corvette	47
60 DNF	GTO	39	(United States) Wiley Doran	(United States) Wiley Doran (United States) Gary Belcher	Chevrolet Corvette	46
61 DNF	GTO	04	(United States) Bill Nelson	(United States) Dale Kreider (United States) Stephen Bond	Pontiac Astre	46
62 DNF	GTO	18	(United States) Terry Wolters	(United States) Terry Wolters (United States) Wayne Miller (Italy) Joe Castellano	Chevrolet Camaro	39
63 DNF	GTO	66	(United States) Big Apple Racing/Champale	(United States) Stephen Behr (United States) Janet Guthrie	Chevrolet Monza	38
64 DNF	GTO	76	(United States) Levitt Racing/Spirit of Sebring	(United States) John Greenwood (United States) Mike Brockman	Chevrolet Corvette C3	36
65 DNF	GTU	26	(Puerto Rico) Bonky Fernandez	(Puerto Rico) Mandy Gonzalez (Puerto Rico) Bonky Fernandez (Puerto Rico) Mike Ramirez	Lotus Elan	28
66 DNF	GTU	17	(United States) Aubrey Bowles	(United States) Aubrey Bowles (United States) Fred Rose	Porsche 911S	21
67 DNF	GTO	40	(United States) R. V. Shulnburg	(United States) Bud Sherk (United States) R. V. Shulnburg (United States) Emory Donaldson	Chevrolet Corvette	11
68 DNF	GTU	63	(Dominican Republic) Luis Mendez	(Dominican Republic) Luis Mendez (Dominican Republic) Tony Canahuate (United States) Rene Rodriguez	BMW 2002	11
69 DNF	GTO	36	(United States) Motorcito Racing	(United States) Tico Almeida (United States) Pepe Romero	Chevrolet Camaro	10
70 DNF	GTU	01	(United States) William Frates	(United States) William Frates (United States) Craig Ross (United States) Spencer Buzbee	Datsun 240Z	6
71 DNF	GTO	9	(United States) Tony Ansley	(United States) Tony Ansley (United States) Ron Connelly	Chevrolet Corvette	6
72 DNF	GTO	79	(United States) Don Nooe	(United States) Don Nooe (United States) Richard Gahn	Shelby GT350	2
73 DNF	GTO	71	(United States) Ralph Noseda	(United States) Ralph Noseda (United States) Richard Small	Chevrolet Camaro	1
74 DNF	GTO	33	(United States) John Carusso	(United States) Dennis Stefl (United States) John Carusso	Chevrolet Corvette	1
75 DNF	GTU	75	(United States) Skip Grenier	(United States) Skip Grenier (United States) Kevin Quigley (United States) Roger Ragland	Mazda RX-2	0
DNS	GTO	2	(United States) Harry Theodoracopulos	(United States) Harry Theodoracopulos (Mexico) Michel Jourdain Sr.	Chevrolet Monza	0
DNS	GTU	4	(United States) C.A.C.I.	(United States) Bob Bergstrom (United States) Bill Shaw (United States) Martin Palmer	Honda Civic	0
DNS	GTO	37	(United States) Rick Mancuso	(United States) Irwin Jann	Chevrolet Camaro	0
DNS	GTO	83	(United States) Jim Logan	(United States) Jim Logan (United States) Bobbie Johnson	BMW 3.0 CSL	0
DNS	GTO	93	(United States) J. E. Logan	(United States) Larry Flynn (United States) Larry Bock	Chevrolet Camaro	0
DNS	GTO	95		(United States) John Freyre (United States) Don Yenko	Chevrolet Camaro	0

=== Class Winners ===
Class	Winners	
GTO	Holbert / Keyser	Porsche 911 Carrera RSR
GTU	White / McClain	Porsche 911S
