= 1994 12 Hours of Sebring =

Sports car endurance race

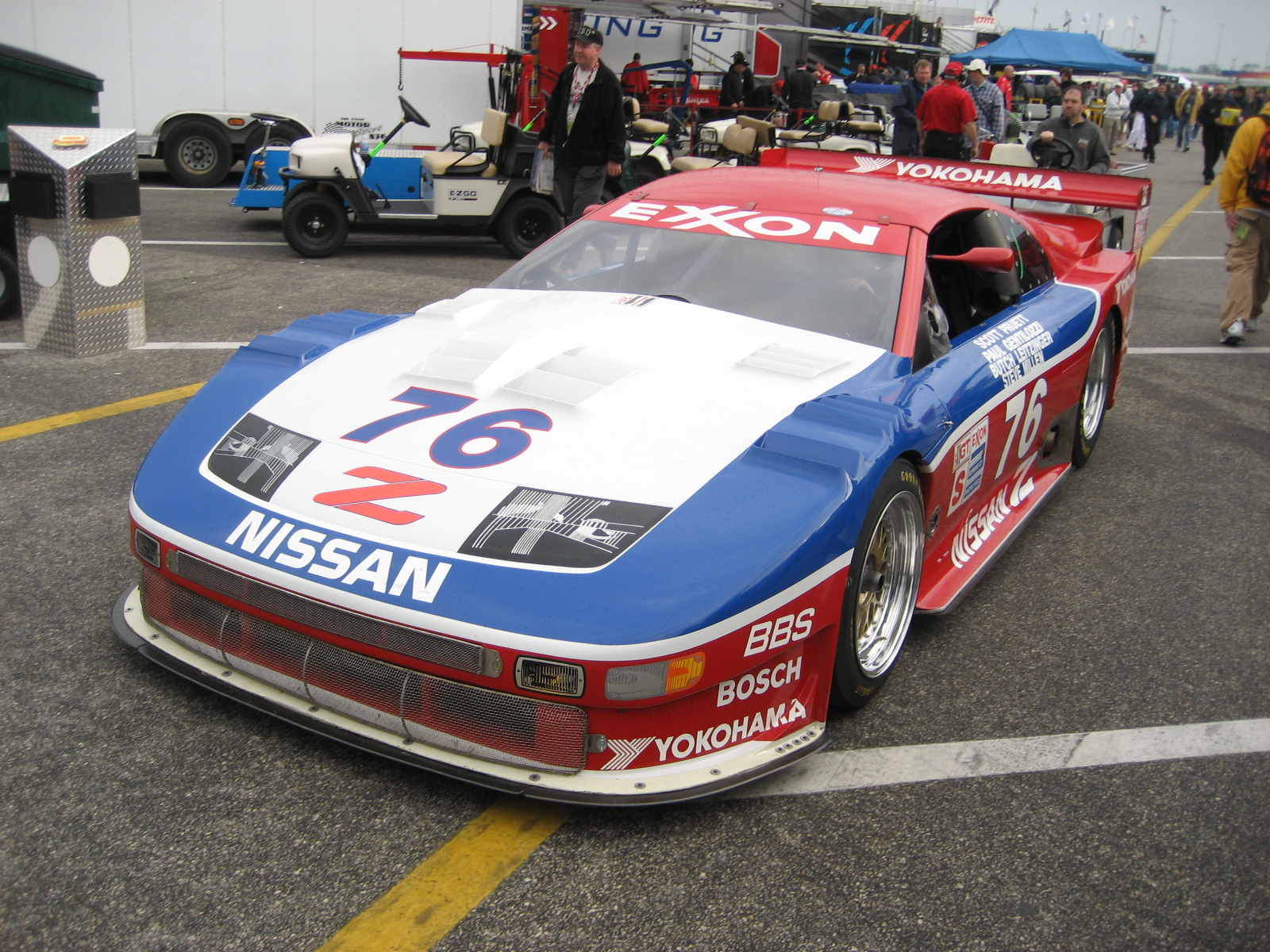
The sister car of the overall race winner

The 42nd Annual Contac 12 Hours of Sebring International Grand Prix of Endurance, was the second round of the 1994 IMSA GT Championship season and was held at the Sebring International Raceway, on 19 March. Victory overall went to the No. 75 Cunningham Racing Nissan 300ZX Turbo driven by John Morton, Johnny O'Connell, and Steve Millen.

== Race results ==
Class Winners are in Bold text.

Pos	Class	No	Team	Drivers	Chassis	Tyre	Laps
Pos	Class	No	Team	Drivers	Engine	Tyre	Laps
1	**GTS**	**75**	**(United States) Cunningham Racing**	**(United States) John Morton (United States) Johnny O'Connell (New Zealand) Steve Millen**	**Nissan 300ZX Turbo**	**Y**	**327**
1	**GTS**	**75**	**(United States) Cunningham Racing**	**(United States) John Morton (United States) Johnny O'Connell (New Zealand) Steve Millen**	**Nissan 3.0L V6 Turbo**	**Y**	**327**
2	**WSC**	**9**	**(United States) Auto Toy Store**	**(United Kingdom) James Weaver (United Kingdom) Derek Bell (United Kingdom) Andy Wallace**	**Spice SE89P**	**G**	**322**
2	**WSC**	**9**	**(United States) Auto Toy Store**	**(United Kingdom) James Weaver (United Kingdom) Derek Bell (United Kingdom) Andy Wallace**	**Chevrolet V8 N/A**	**G**	**322**
3	WSC	63	(United States) Downing/Atlanta	(South Africa) Wayne Taylor (United States) Tim McAdam (United States) Jim Downing	Kudzu DG-3 WSC	**G**	314
3	WSC	63	(United States) Downing/Atlanta	(South Africa) Wayne Taylor (United States) Tim McAdam (United States) Jim Downing	Mazda Rotary	**G**	314
4	WSC	44	(United States) Scandia Motorsports	(Canada) Ross Bentley (United States) Andy Evans (United States) Butch Leitzinger	Spice WSC94	?	309
4	WSC	44	(United States) Scandia Motorsports	(Canada) Ross Bentley (United States) Andy Evans (United States) Butch Leitzinger	Chevrolet N/A	?	309
5	**GTU**	**49**	**(United States) Mark Sandridge**	**(United States) Nick Ham (United States) Joe Varde (United States) Mark Sandridge**	**Porsche 911 Carrera RSR**	**Y**	**305**
5	**GTU**	**49**	**(United States) Mark Sandridge**	**(United States) Nick Ham (United States) Joe Varde (United States) Mark Sandridge**	**Porsche Flat 6**	**Y**	**305**
6	GTU	95	(United States) Leitzinger Racing	(United States) Jim Pace (United States) Butch Hamlet (United States) Barry Waddell	Nissan 240SX	**T**	305
6	GTU	95	(United States) Leitzinger Racing	(United States) Jim Pace (United States) Butch Hamlet (United States) Barry Waddell	Nissan V6 N/A	**T**	305
7	GTS	99	(Germany) Konrad Motorsport	(Sweden) Örnulf Wirdheim (Austria) Franz Konrad (France) Ferdinand de Lesseps (United States) Charles Mendez	Porsche 911 Turbo	**P**	299
7	GTS	99	(Germany) Konrad Motorsport	(Sweden) Örnulf Wirdheim (Austria) Franz Konrad (France) Ferdinand de Lesseps (United States) Charles Mendez	Porsche Flat 6 Turbo	**P**	299
8	GTU	01	(United States) Rohr Corporation	(United States) Jochen Rohr (United States) Jeff Purner (United States) John O'Steen	Porsche 964 Carrera RSR	?	298
8	GTU	01	(United States) Rohr Corporation	(United States) Jochen Rohr (United States) Jeff Purner (United States) John O'Steen	Porsche 3.8L Flat 6 N/A	?	298
9	GTU	37	(Switzerland) Ecurie Biennoise	(Switzerland) Enzo Calderari (Switzerland) Lilian Bryner (Italy) Renato Mastropietro	Porsche 911 Carrera RSR	**P**	293
9	GTU	37	(Switzerland) Ecurie Biennoise	(Switzerland) Enzo Calderari (Switzerland) Lilian Bryner (Italy) Renato Mastropietro	Porsche Flat 6 N/A	**P**	293
10	WSC	20	(United States) Consulier Racing	(United States) Scott Lagasse (United States) Ken Schrader	Consulier Intruder	**G**	289
10	WSC	20	(United States) Consulier Racing	(United States) Scott Lagasse (United States) Ken Schrader	?	**G**	289
11	GTS	59	(United States) Brumos Porsche	(Germany) Hans-Joachim Stuck (Germany) Walter Röhrl (United States) Hurley Haywood	Porsche 964 Turbo GT America	**G**	287
11	GTS	59	(United States) Brumos Porsche	(Germany) Hans-Joachim Stuck (Germany) Walter Röhrl (United States) Hurley Haywood	Porsche Flat 6 Twin-Turbo	**G**	287
12	GTS	69	(Germany) Gustl Spreng Racing	(Germany) Gustl Sprengl (United States) Ray Mummery	Porsche 964 Carrera RSR	?	283
12	GTS	69	(Germany) Gustl Spreng Racing	(Germany) Gustl Sprengl (United States) Ray Mummery	Porsche 3.6L Flat 6 N/A	?	283
13	GTU	26	(United States) Alex Job Racing	(United States) Charles Slater (United States) Peter Uria (United States) Joe Cogbill	Porsche 911	**G**	280
13	GTU	26	(United States) Alex Job Racing	(United States) Charles Slater (United States) Peter Uria (United States) Joe Cogbill	Porsche Flat 6 N/A	**G**	280
14	GTS	71	(Canada) Churchill Transport	(Canada) Jerry Churchill (Canada) Randy Churchill	Oldsmobile Cutlass	**G**	277
14	GTS	71	(Canada) Churchill Transport	(Canada) Jerry Churchill (Canada) Randy Churchill	?	**G**	277
15	GTU	00	(Germany) Konrad Motorsport	(Brazil) Antônio Hermann (Netherlands) Eric van Vliet (Brazil) Maurizio Sandro Sala	Porsche 964 Carrera RSR	**P**	267
15	GTU	00	(Germany) Konrad Motorsport	(Brazil) Antônio Hermann (Netherlands) Eric van Vliet (Brazil) Maurizio Sandro Sala	Porsche Flat 6 N/A	**P**	267
16 DNF	GTS	6	(United States) Brix Racing	(United States) R. K. Smith (United States) Tommy Riggins (United States) Irv Hoerr (United States) Darin Brassfield	Oldsmobile Cutlass Supreme	?	265
16 DNF	GTS	6	(United States) Brix Racing	(United States) R. K. Smith (United States) Tommy Riggins (United States) Irv Hoerr (United States) Darin Brassfield	?	?	265
17	WSC	36	(United States) Pegasus Racing	(United States) Pete Halsmer (Austria) Dieter Quester (Germany) Oliver Kuttner (Germany) Wolf Zweifler	Pegasus	**G**	259
17	WSC	36	(United States) Pegasus Racing	(United States) Pete Halsmer (Austria) Dieter Quester (Germany) Oliver Kuttner (Germany) Wolf Zweifler	BMW N/A	**G**	259
18	GTU	4	Dibos Racing/Team Peru	(Peru) Eduardo Dibós Chappuis (United States) Les Lindley (United States) Bill Auberlen	Mazda RX-7	**Y**	255
18	GTU	4	Dibos Racing/Team Peru	(Peru) Eduardo Dibós Chappuis (United States) Les Lindley (United States) Bill Auberlen	Mazda Rotary	**Y**	255
19	GTU	58	(United States) Pro Technik Racing	(United States) Sam Shalala (United States) Mycroft Karos (United States) Ron Kerr (United States) Bill Ferran	Porsche 911	?	254
19	GTU	58	(United States) Pro Technik Racing	(United States) Sam Shalala (United States) Mycroft Karos (United States) Ron Kerr (United States) Bill Ferran	Porsche Flat 6	?	254
20	GTS	51	(United States) Bruce Trenery	(United States) Bruce Trenery (United Kingdom) Jeffrey Pattinson (United States) Andrew Osman	Oldsmobile Cutlass	?	253
20	GTS	51	(United States) Bruce Trenery	(United States) Bruce Trenery (United Kingdom) Jeffrey Pattinson (United States) Andrew Osman	?	?	253
21 DNF	WSC	11	(United States) Tony Kester	(United States) Tony Kester (United States) Stan Cleva (United States) Joseph Hamilton	Tiga GT286 Spyder	**G**	252
21 DNF	WSC	11	(United States) Tony Kester	(United States) Tony Kester (United States) Stan Cleva (United States) Joseph Hamilton	Mazda Rotary	**G**	252
22	GTU	57	(United States) Kryderacing	(United States) Reed Kryder (United States) Frank del Vecchio (United States) Joe Danaher	Nissan 240SX	**G**	241
22	GTU	57	(United States) Kryderacing	(United States) Reed Kryder (United States) Frank del Vecchio (United States) Joe Danaher	Nissan V6 N/A	**G**	241
23	GTU	81	(Canada) Vito Scavone	(Canada) Vito Scavone (Canada) Derek Orland (Canada) John McAulay	Porsche 944 Turbo	**P**	237
23	GTU	81	(Canada) Vito Scavone	(Canada) Vito Scavone (Canada) Derek Orland (Canada) John McAulay	?	**P**	237
24	GTU	09	(United States) Charles Wagner	(United States) Charles Wagner (United States) Dave Russell (United States) Kenneth Brady (United States) Steve Mott	Mazda RX-7	**Y**	237
24	GTU	09	(United States) Charles Wagner	(United States) Charles Wagner (United States) Dave Russell (United States) Kenneth Brady (United States) Steve Mott	Mazda Rotary	**Y**	237
25	GTU	12	(United States) Lotus USA	(United States) Doc Bundy (United States) David Murry	Lotus Esprit X180R	**G**	231
25	GTU	12	(United States) Lotus USA	(United States) Doc Bundy (United States) David Murry	Lotus I4 Turbo	**G**	231
26	GTS	23	(United States) Curren Motorsports	(United States) Tom Curren (United States) Robert Borders (United States) Bill Julian (United States) Gene Harry	Oldsmobile Cutlass	**G**	224
26	GTS	23	(United States) Curren Motorsports	(United States) Tom Curren (United States) Robert Borders (United States) Bill Julian (United States) Gene Harry	?	**G**	224
27	GTS	04	(United States) Art Cross	(United States) Art Cross (United States) Steve Roberts (United States) Bobby Dumont	Chevrolet Camaro	**G**	218
27	GTS	04	(United States) Art Cross	(United States) Art Cross (United States) Steve Roberts (United States) Bobby Dumont	Chevrolet V8	**G**	218
28	GTU	91	(United States) Mel A. Butt	(United States) Lorin Hicks (United States) Mel Butt (United States) Ron Zitza	Porsche 911	**G**	207
28	GTU	91	(United States) Mel A. Butt	(United States) Lorin Hicks (United States) Mel Butt (United States) Ron Zitza	Porsche Flat 6	**G**	207
29	GTS	21	(United States) Bob Hundredmark	(United States) Bob Hundredmark (Canada) Peter Hanson (United States) Ken Fengler (United States) Dan King	Oldsmobile Cutlass	?	198
29	GTS	21	(United States) Bob Hundredmark	(United States) Bob Hundredmark (Canada) Peter Hanson (United States) Ken Fengler (United States) Dan King	?	?	198
30 DNF	GTU	73	(United States) Jack Lewis Enterprises Ltd.	(United States) Jack Refenning (United States) John Bourassa (United States) Jack Lewis	Porsche 911 Carrera RSR	?	194
30 DNF	GTU	73	(United States) Jack Lewis Enterprises Ltd.	(United States) Jack Refenning (United States) John Bourassa (United States) Jack Lewis	Porsche Flat 6 N/A	?	194
31	GTU	68	(United States) Charles Coker Jr.	(United States) Ken McKinnon (United States) Flip Groggins (United States) Charles Coker (United States) Hugh Johnson	Porsche 944 Turbo	**G**	194
31	GTU	68	(United States) Charles Coker Jr.	(United States) Ken McKinnon (United States) Flip Groggins (United States) Charles Coker (United States) Hugh Johnson	?	**G**	194
32 DNF	GTS	5	(United States) Brix Racing	(United States) Scott Pruett (United States) Price Cobb (United States) Tommy Riggins	Oldsmobile Cutlass Supreme	**G**	190
32 DNF	GTS	5	(United States) Brix Racing	(United States) Scott Pruett (United States) Price Cobb (United States) Tommy Riggins	?	**G**	190
33	GTS	50	(United States) Overbagh Racing	(United States) Mark Montgomery (United States) Tom Ministri (United States) Oma Kimbrough (United States) Hoyt Overbagh	Chevrolet Camaro	**G**	186
33	GTS	50	(United States) Overbagh Racing	(United States) Mark Montgomery (United States) Tom Ministri (United States) Oma Kimbrough (United States) Hoyt Overbagh	Chevrolet V8 N/A	**G**	186
34	GTS	94	(United States) Morrison Motorsports	(United States) John Heinricy (United States) Stu Hayner (United States) Andy Pilgrim	Chevrolet Corvette ZR-1	**G**	185
34	GTS	94	(United States) Morrison Motorsports	(United States) John Heinricy (United States) Stu Hayner (United States) Andy Pilgrim	Chevrolet V8	**G**	185
35 DNF	GTU	96	(United States) Leitzinger Racing	(United States) Geoff Boss (United States) Glenn Straub (United States) Andy Boss	Nissan 240SX	**T**	178
35 DNF	GTU	96	(United States) Leitzinger Racing	(United States) Geoff Boss (United States) Glenn Straub (United States) Andy Boss	Nissan V6 N/A	**T**	178
36 DNF	GTS	93	(United States) Morrison Motorsports	(United States) Del Percilla (United States) Andy Pilgrim (United States) Jim Minneker (United States) Jeff Nowicki	Chevrolet Corvette ZR-1	**G**	165
36 DNF	GTS	93	(United States) Morrison Motorsports	(United States) Del Percilla (United States) Andy Pilgrim (United States) Jim Minneker (United States) Jeff Nowicki	Chevrolet V8	**G**	165
37 DNF	GTS	03	(United States) Carolina Racing Engines	(United States) Gary Smith (United States) Timothy Spurr (United States) Steve Goldin	Chevrolet Camaro	**G**	129
37 DNF	GTS	03	(United States) Carolina Racing Engines	(United States) Gary Smith (United States) Timothy Spurr (United States) Steve Goldin	Chevrolet V8	**G**	129
38 DNF	GTS	76	(United States) Cunningham Racing	(United States) Paul Gentilozzi (United States) Butch Leitzinger	Nissan 300ZX Turbo	**Y**	121
38 DNF	GTS	76	(United States) Cunningham Racing	(United States) Paul Gentilozzi (United States) Butch Leitzinger	?	**Y**	121
39 DNF	WSC	45	(United States) Scandia Motorsports	(United States) John Macaluso (United States) Paul Debban (United States) Hugh Fuller	Kudzu DG-2 WSC	**G**	114
39 DNF	WSC	45	(United States) Scandia Motorsports	(United States) John Macaluso (United States) Paul Debban (United States) Hugh Fuller	?	**G**	114
40 DNF	WSC	2	(United States) Brix Racing	(Canada) Jeremy Dale (United States) Bob Schader (Italy) Ruggero Melgrati	Spice AK93	**G**	91
40 DNF	WSC	2	(United States) Brix Racing	(Canada) Jeremy Dale (United States) Bob Schader (Italy) Ruggero Melgrati	Oldsmobile V8 N/A	**G**	91
41 DNF	GTS	72	(United States) Champion Porsche	(Canada) Bill Adam (United States) John Paul Jr. (United States) Victor Gonzalez	Porsche 964 Turbo	**G**	91
41 DNF	GTS	72	(United States) Champion Porsche	(Canada) Bill Adam (United States) John Paul Jr. (United States) Victor Gonzalez	Porsche Flat 6 Turbo	**G**	91
42	GTS	19	(United States) O'Brien Motorsports	(United States) Linda Pobst (United States) Leigh O'Brien (Canada) Kat Teasdale	Chevrolet Camaro	**G**	81
42	GTS	19	(United States) O'Brien Motorsports	(United States) Linda Pobst (United States) Leigh O'Brien (Canada) Kat Teasdale	Chevrolet V8	**G**	81
43 DNF	WSC	10	(Canada) Premdor	(Canada) John Jones (Canada) Jeff Lapcevich (Canada) Neil Jamieson	Tiga FJ94	**G**	68
43 DNF	WSC	10	(Canada) Premdor	(Canada) John Jones (Canada) Jeff Lapcevich (Canada) Neil Jamieson	?	**G**	68
44 DNF	GTS	87	(United States) John Annis	(United States) John Annis (United States) Louis Beall (United States) Dana DeShong (United States) Duane Meyer	Chevrolet Camaro	**G**	13
44 DNF	GTS	87	(United States) John Annis	(United States) John Annis (United States) Louis Beall (United States) Dana DeShong (United States) Duane Meyer	Chevrolet V8	**G**	13
45 DNF	GTS	35	(United States) Bill McDill	(United States) Richard McDill (United States) Tom Juckette (United States) Bill McDill	Chevrolet Camaro	?	8
45 DNF	GTS	35	(United States) Bill McDill	(United States) Richard McDill (United States) Tom Juckette (United States) Bill McDill	Chevrolet V8	?	8
46 DNF	GTU	08	(Ecuador) Saeta Racing	(Ecuador) Henry Taleb (Ecuador) Terry Andrews (Ecuador) Jean-Pierre Michelet (Ecuador) Ignacio Escobar	Nissan 300ZX	**Y**	6
46 DNF	GTU	08	(Ecuador) Saeta Racing	(Ecuador) Henry Taleb (Ecuador) Terry Andrews (Ecuador) Jean-Pierre Michelet (Ecuador) Ignacio Escobar	?	**Y**	6
47 DNF	WSC	22	(United States) Screaming Eagles Racing	(United Kingdom) Andy Wallace (United States) Craig T. Nelson (United States) Dan Clark (United States) Dorsey Schroeder	Spice SE90	?	5
47 DNF	WSC	22	(United States) Screaming Eagles Racing	(United Kingdom) Andy Wallace (United States) Craig T. Nelson (United States) Dan Clark (United States) Dorsey Schroeder	?	?	5
48 DNF	GTU	0	(United States) Leigh Miller Racing	(United States) Leigh Miller (United States) Tom Rathbun (United States) Lance Stewart (United States) Mike Holt	Porsche 944 Turbo	**Y**	4
48 DNF	GTU	0	(United States) Leigh Miller Racing	(United States) Leigh Miller (United States) Tom Rathbun (United States) Lance Stewart (United States) Mike Holt	?	**Y**	4

- Fastest lap: Butch Leitzinger/Paul Gentilozzi, 2:01.047secs.

=== Class Winners ===
Class	Winners	
WSC	Weaver / Bell / Wallace	Spice SE89
GTS	Morton / O'Connell / Millen	Nissan 300ZX
GTU	Ham / Varde / Sandridge	Porsche 911 Carrera RSR
