= 1989 12 Hours of Sebring =

Sports car endurance race held at Sebring International Raceway, Sebring, Florida, USA

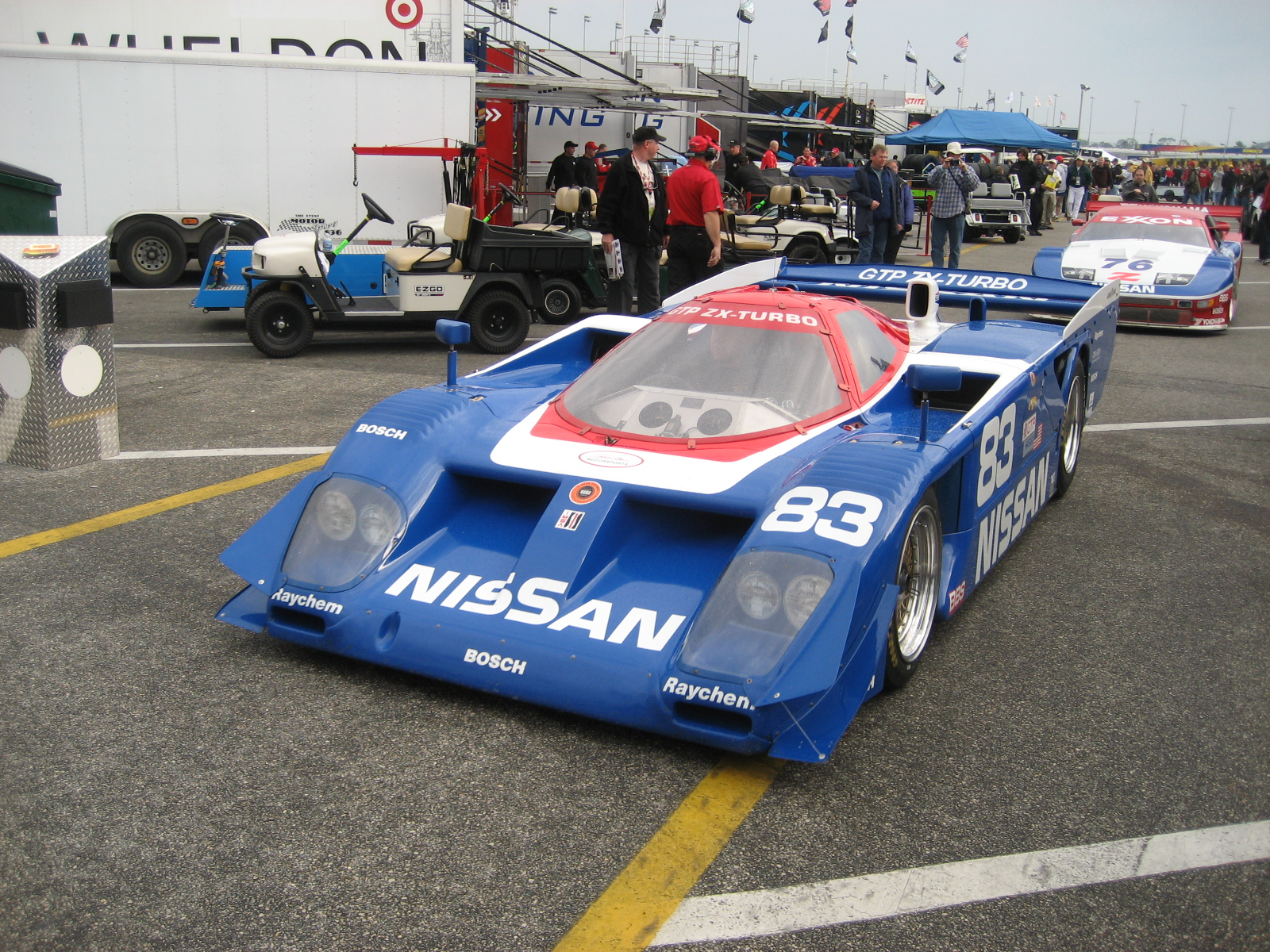
The overall winning No. 83 Nissan GTP ZX-Turbo

The 12 Hours of Sebring Grand Prix of Endurance, was the third round of the 1989 IMSA GT Championship and was held at the Sebring International Raceway, on March 18, 1989. Victory overall went to the No. 83 Electramotive Engineering Nissan GTP ZX-Turbo driven by Chip Robinson, Geoff Brabham, and Arie Luyendyk.

== Race results ==
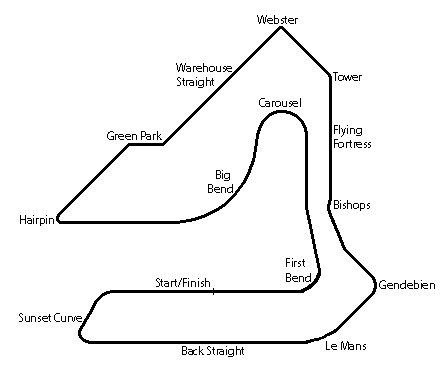
Sebring in 1989

Class winners in bold.

Pos	Class	No	Team	Drivers	Chassis	Tyre	Laps
Pos	Class	No	Team	Drivers	Engine	Tyre	Laps
1	**GTP**	**83**	(United States) **Electramotive Engineering**	(United States) **Chip Robinson** (Australia) **Geoff Brabham** (Netherlands) **Arie Luyendyk**	**Nissan GTP ZX-Turbo**	**G**	**330**
1	**GTP**	**83**	(United States) **Electramotive Engineering**	(United States) **Chip Robinson** (Australia) **Geoff Brabham** (Netherlands) **Arie Luyendyk**	**Nissan 3.0L V6 Turbo**	**G**	**330**
2	GTP	61	(United Kingdom) Castrol Jaguar Racing	(Denmark) John Nielsen (United States) Price Cobb	Jaguar XJR-9	**D**	328
2	GTP	61	(United Kingdom) Castrol Jaguar Racing	(Denmark) John Nielsen (United States) Price Cobb	Jaguar 6.0L V12 N/A	**D**	328
3	GTP	86	(United States) Bayside Racing/Bruce Leven	(United Kingdom) James Weaver (United States) Dominic Dobson	Porsche 962	**G**	320
3	GTP	86	(United States) Bayside Racing/Bruce Leven	(United Kingdom) James Weaver (United States) Dominic Dobson	Porsche 3.0L Flat 6 Turbo	**G**	320
4	GTP	30	(Germany) Momo/Gebhardt Racing	(Italy) Giampiero Moretti (Italy) Massimo Sigala (Republic of Ireland) Michael Roe (United Kingdom) Derek Bell	Porsche 962	**G**	317
4	GTP	30	(Germany) Momo/Gebhardt Racing	(Italy) Giampiero Moretti (Italy) Massimo Sigala (Republic of Ireland) Michael Roe (United Kingdom) Derek Bell	Porsche 3.0L Flat 6 Turbo	**G**	317
5	GTP	0	(Germany) Joest Racing	(Germany) Frank Jelinski (France) Jean-Louis Ricci (France) Bob Wollek	Porsche 962	**G**	315
5	GTP	0	(Germany) Joest Racing	(Germany) Frank Jelinski (France) Jean-Louis Ricci (France) Bob Wollek	Porsche 3.0L Flat 6 Turbo	**G**	315
6	GTP	10	(United States) Hotchkis Racing	(United States) Jim Adams (United States) John Hotchkis (United States) John Hotchkis Jr.	Porsche 962	**G**	300
6	GTP	10	(United States) Hotchkis Racing	(United States) Jim Adams (United States) John Hotchkis (United States) John Hotchkis Jr.	Porsche 3.0L Flat 6 Turbo	**G**	300
7	**Lights**	**55**	(United States) **Huffaker Racing**	(United States) **Bob Lesnett** (United States) **Dan Marvin**	**Spice SE86CL**	**F**	**292**
7	**Lights**	**55**	(United States) **Huffaker Racing**	(United States) **Bob Lesnett** (United States) **Dan Marvin**	**Pontiac 3.0L I4 N/A**	**F**	**292**
8	**GTO**	**11**	(United States) **Roush Racing**	(United States) **Wally Dallenbach Jr.** (United States) **Dorsey Schroeder**	**Mercury Cougar XR-7**	**G**	**292**
8	**GTO**	**11**	(United States) **Roush Racing**	(United States) **Wally Dallenbach Jr.** (United States) **Dorsey Schroeder**	**Ford 6.0L V8 N/A**	**G**	**292**
9	Lights	9	(United States) Essex Racing	(United States) Charles Morgan (United States) Tom Hessert	Spice SE88P	**G**	290
9	Lights	9	(United States) Essex Racing	(United States) Charles Morgan (United States) Tom Hessert	Buick 3.0L V6 N/A	**G**	290
10	GTO	16	(United States) Roush Racing	(United States) Pete Halsmer (United States) Bob Earl	Mercury Cougar XR-7	**G**	288
10	GTO	16	(United States) Roush Racing	(United States) Pete Halsmer (United States) Bob Earl	Ford 6.0L V8 N/A	**G**	288
11	GTP	33	(United States) Spice Engineering USA	(Greece) Costas Los (United States) Jeff Kline	Spice SE89P	**G**	285
11	GTP	33	(United States) Spice Engineering USA	(Greece) Costas Los (United States) Jeff Kline	Pontiac 5.0L V8 N/A	**G**	285
12	GTO	38	(United States) Mandeville Auto Tech	(United States) Roger Mandeville (United States) Kelly Marsh	Mazda RX-7	**Y**	284
12	GTO	38	(United States) Mandeville Auto Tech	(United States) Roger Mandeville (United States) Kelly Marsh	Mazda 1.9L 3 Rotor	**Y**	284
13	GTO	90	(United States) Road Circuit Technology	(United States) Les Delano (United States) Andy Petery (United States) Craig Carter	Mercury Capri	**G**	282
13	GTO	90	(United States) Road Circuit Technology	(United States) Les Delano (United States) Andy Petery (United States) Craig Carter	Ford 6.0L V8 N/A	**G**	282
14	GTP	60	(United Kingdom) Castrol Jaguar Racing	(United States) Davy Jones (Netherlands) Jan Lammers	Jaguar XJR-9	**D**	281
14	GTP	60	(United Kingdom) Castrol Jaguar Racing	(United States) Davy Jones (Netherlands) Jan Lammers	Jaguar 6.0L V12 N/A	**D**	281
15	**GTU**	**74**	(United States) **Huffaker Racing**	(United States) **George Robinson** (United States) **Bart Kendall** (United States) **Johnny Unser**	**Pontiac Fiero**	**F**	**278**
15	**GTU**	**74**	(United States) **Huffaker Racing**	(United States) **George Robinson** (United States) **Bart Kendall** (United States) **Johnny Unser**	**Pontiac 3.0L I4 N/A**	**F**	**278**
16	GTU	82	(United States) Dick Greer Racing	(United States) Dick Greer (United States) Mike Mees (United States) John Finger	Mazda RX-7	**Y**	273
16	GTU	82	(United States) Dick Greer Racing	(United States) Dick Greer (United States) Mike Mees (United States) John Finger	Mazda 1.3L Rotary	**Y**	273
17	GTU	71	(United States) Team Highball	(United States) Amos Johnson (United States) Dennis Shaw (United States) Paul Lewis	Mazda RX-7	**Y**	272
17	GTU	71	(United States) Team Highball	(United States) Amos Johnson (United States) Dennis Shaw (United States) Paul Lewis	Mazda 1.3L Rotary	**Y**	272
18	Lights	19	(United States) Essex Racing	(United States) Reggie Smith (United States) Michael Dow (United States) Monte Shalett	Tiga GT288	**G**	270
18	Lights	19	(United States) Essex Racing	(United States) Reggie Smith (United States) Michael Dow (United States) Monte Shalett	Buick 3.0L V6 N/A	**G**	270
19	GTU	89	(United States) 901 Racing	(United States) Peter Uria (United States) Jack Refenning (United States) Freddy Baker	Porsche 911 Carrera RSR	**F**	268
19	GTU	89	(United States) 901 Racing	(United States) Peter Uria (United States) Jack Refenning (United States) Freddy Baker	Porsche 3.2L Flat 6 N/A	**F**	268
20 DNF	GTP	09	(United States) Ball Bros. Racing	(United States) Steve Durst (United States) Mike Brockman (United States) Jay Cochran	Spice SE88P	**G**	263
20 DNF	GTP	09	(United States) Ball Bros. Racing	(United States) Steve Durst (United States) Mike Brockman (United States) Jay Cochran	Buick 4.5L V6 N/A	**G**	263
21	Lights	43	(United States) John Higgins	(Canada) Charles Monk (United States) Lorenzo Lamas (United States) John Higgins (United States) Chip Mead	Fabcar CL	**G**	254
21	Lights	43	(United States) John Higgins	(Canada) Charles Monk (United States) Lorenzo Lamas (United States) John Higgins (United States) Chip Mead	Porsche 3.0L Flat 6 N/A	**G**	254
22	GTU	72	(United States) Jay Kjoller	(United States) Jay Kjoller (United States) Patrick Mooney (United States) Steve Volk	Porsche 911	**F**	248
22	GTU	72	(United States) Jay Kjoller	(United States) Jay Kjoller (United States) Patrick Mooney (United States) Steve Volk	Porsche 3.2L Flat 6 N/A	**F**	248
23	GTO	03	(United States) Skoal Bandit Racing	(United States) Max Jones (United States) Buz McCall	Chevrolet Camaro	**G**	246
23	GTO	03	(United States) Skoal Bandit Racing	(United States) Max Jones (United States) Buz McCall	Chevrolet 5.5L V8 N/A	**G**	246
24	Lights	63	(United States) Downing/Atlanta	(United States) Jim Downing (United States) John O'Steen (United States) Howard Katz	Argo JM19	**G**	246
24	Lights	63	(United States) Downing/Atlanta	(United States) Jim Downing (United States) John O'Steen (United States) Howard Katz	Mazda 1.3L 2 Rotor	**G**	246
25	Lights	4	(United States) S&L Racing	(United States) Scott Schubot (United States) Tom Blackaller (United States) Linda Ludemann	Spice SE88P	**G**	245
25	Lights	4	(United States) S&L Racing	(United States) Scott Schubot (United States) Tom Blackaller (United States) Linda Ludemann	Buick 3.0L V6 N/A	**G**	245
26	GTU	57	(United States) Kryderacing	(United States) Reed Kryder (United States) John Gimble (United States) Frank del Vecchio	Nissan 300ZX	**G**	245
26	GTU	57	(United States) Kryderacing	(United States) Reed Kryder (United States) John Gimble (United States) Frank del Vecchio	Nissan 2.8L V6 N/A	**G**	245
27	GTO	18	(United States) Ken Bupp	(United States) Ken Bupp (Canada) Robert Peters	Chevrolet Camaro	**G**	244
27	GTO	18	(United States) Ken Bupp	(United States) Ken Bupp (Canada) Robert Peters	Chevrolet 5.0L V8 N/A	**G**	244
28	GTU	87	(United States) Overton Autosport	(United States) Lance Stewart (United States) Ron Cortez	Mazda RX-7	**F**	243
28	GTU	87	(United States) Overton Autosport	(United States) Lance Stewart (United States) Ron Cortez	Mazda 1.3L Rotary	**F**	243
29	GTU	95	(United States) Leitzinger Racing	(United States) Bob Leitzinger (United States) Butch Leitzinger (United States) Chuck Kurtz	Nissan 240SX	**T**	228
29	GTU	95	(United States) Leitzinger Racing	(United States) Bob Leitzinger (United States) Butch Leitzinger (United States) Chuck Kurtz	Nissan 3.0L V6 N/A	**T**	228
30	GTU	62	(United States) Alex Job Racing	(United States) Alex Job (United States) Chris Kraft (United States) Rusty Bond	Porsche 911	**G**	225
30	GTU	62	(United States) Alex Job Racing	(United States) Alex Job (United States) Chris Kraft (United States) Rusty Bond	Porsche 3.2L Flat 6 N/A	**G**	225
31	Lights	12	(United States) Carlos Bobeda Racing	(Mexico) Tomas Lopez (United States) Albert Rocca (United States) Carlos Bobeda	Tiga GT286	**G**	225
31	Lights	12	(United States) Carlos Bobeda Racing	(Mexico) Tomas Lopez (United States) Albert Rocca (United States) Carlos Bobeda	Mazda 1.3L Rotary	**G**	225
32	GTU	17	(United States) Al Bacon Perf	(United States) Al Bacon (United States) Bob Reed	Mazda RX-7	**F**	216
32	GTU	17	(United States) Al Bacon Perf	(United States) Al Bacon (United States) Bob Reed	Mazda 1.3L Rotary	**F**	216
33 DNF	GTO	75	(United States) Cunningham Racing	(United States) John Morton (New Zealand) Steve Millen	Nissan 300ZX Turbo	**G**	215
33 DNF	GTO	75	(United States) Cunningham Racing	(United States) John Morton (New Zealand) Steve Millen	Nissan 3.0L I6 N/A	**G**	215
34 DNF	Lights	40	(Canada) Bieri Racing	(Italy) Martino Finotto (Italy) Paolo Guatamacchia (Canada) Uli Bieri	Tiga GT286	**G**	193
34 DNF	Lights	40	(Canada) Bieri Racing	(Italy) Martino Finotto (Italy) Paolo Guatamacchia (Canada) Uli Bieri	Ferrari 3.0L V8 N/A	**G**	193
35	GTO	47	(United States) Lion Rampant Racing	(France) Ferdinand de Lesseps (United States) Luis Sereix (United States) Chaunce Wallace (Belgium) Hervé Regout	Chevrolet Camaro	**G**	189
35	GTO	47	(United States) Lion Rampant Racing	(France) Ferdinand de Lesseps (United States) Luis Sereix (United States) Chaunce Wallace (Belgium) Hervé Regout	Chevrolet 5.0L V8 N/A	**G**	189
36 DNF	GTU	48	(United States) Red Line Racing	(United States) Mike Graham (United States) Dave Russell (United States) Alan Crouch	BMW 325i	**F**	187
36 DNF	GTU	48	(United States) Red Line Racing	(United States) Mike Graham (United States) Dave Russell (United States) Alan Crouch	BMW 3.4L I6 N/A	**F**	187
37 DNF	GTP	67	(United States) Busby Racing	(France) Bob Wollek (United Kingdom) Derek Bell (United States) John Andretti	Porsche 962	**BF**	184
37 DNF	GTP	67	(United States) Busby Racing	(France) Bob Wollek (United Kingdom) Derek Bell (United States) John Andretti	Porsche 3.0L Flat 6 Turbo	**BF**	184
38 DNF	GTO	44	(United States) Thomas Sapp	(United States) Tim Morgan (United States) Marcus Opie (United States) Peter Morgan (United States) Charles Bair	Chevrolet Corvette C4	**G**	171
38 DNF	GTO	44	(United States) Thomas Sapp	(United States) Tim Morgan (United States) Marcus Opie (United States) Peter Morgan (United States) Charles Bair	Chevrolet 5.0L V8 N/A	**G**	171
39 DNF	GTP	98	(United States) All American Racers	(United States) Chris Cord (United States) Steve Bren (United States) Drake Olson	Toyota 88C	**G**	149
39 DNF	GTP	98	(United States) All American Racers	(United States) Chris Cord (United States) Steve Bren (United States) Drake Olson	Toyota 2.1L I4 Turbo	**G**	149
40 DNF	GTO	53	(United States) Bill McDill	(United States) Richard McDill (United States) Bill McDill	Chevrolet Camaro	**G**	146
40 DNF	GTO	53	(United States) Bill McDill	(United States) Richard McDill (United States) Bill McDill	Chevrolet 6.0L V8 N/A	**G**	146
41 DNF	GTU	22	(United States) Guy Church	(United States) Guy Church (United States) E. J. Generotti (United States) Louis D'Agostino	Mazda RX-7	**HO**	141
41 DNF	GTU	22	(United States) Guy Church	(United States) Guy Church (United States) E. J. Generotti (United States) Louis D'Agostino	Mazda 1.3L Rotary	**HO**	141
42 DNF	Lights	25	(United States) Brent O'Neill	(United States) Brent O'Neill (United States) Steve Shelton (United States) Don Courtney	Argo JM19	**G**	137
42 DNF	Lights	25	(United States) Brent O'Neill	(United States) Brent O'Neill (United States) Steve Shelton (United States) Don Courtney	Buick 3.0L V6 N/A	**G**	137
43 DNF	GTO	2	(Canada) Powell Equipment	(Canada) John Jones (Canada) Hunter Jones (Canada) Richard Andison	Chevrolet Corvette	**G**	116
43 DNF	GTO	2	(Canada) Powell Equipment	(Canada) John Jones (Canada) Hunter Jones (Canada) Richard Andison	Chevrolet 5.5L V8 N/A	**G**	116
44 DNF	GTU	50	(Canada) Fritz Hochreuter	(Canada) Rudy Bartling (Canada) Rainer Brezinka (Canada) Fritz Hochreuter	Porsche 911	**G**	115
44 DNF	GTU	50	(Canada) Fritz Hochreuter	(Canada) Rudy Bartling (Canada) Rainer Brezinka (Canada) Fritz Hochreuter	Porsche 3.0L Flat 6 N/A	**G**	115
45 DNF	GTU	68	(Dominican Republic) Luis Mendez	(Dominican Republic) Luis Mendez (Puerto Rico) Mandy Gonzalez (Puerto Rico) Tato Ferrer	Porsche 911 Carrera RSR	**G**	101
45 DNF	GTU	68	(Dominican Republic) Luis Mendez	(Dominican Republic) Luis Mendez (Puerto Rico) Mandy Gonzalez (Puerto Rico) Tato Ferrer	Porsche 3.5L Flat 6 N/A	**G**	101
46 DNF	GTU	45	(United States) Charles Slater	(United States) Charles Slater (United States) Kenneth Brady (United States) Norm Dupont	Porsche 911	**G**	93
46 DNF	GTU	45	(United States) Charles Slater	(United States) Charles Slater (United States) Kenneth Brady (United States) Norm Dupont	Porsche 3.2L Flat 6 N/A	**G**	93
47 DNF	GTO	05	(United States) Ken Hendrick Racing	(United States) Ken Hendrick (United States) Dan Gallant	Oldsmobile Toronado	**G**	90
47 DNF	GTO	05	(United States) Ken Hendrick Racing	(United States) Ken Hendrick (United States) Dan Gallant	Buick 4.5L V6 N/A	**G**	90
48 DNF	GTU	7	(Puerto Rico) Juan Carlos Negron	(Puerto Rico) Juan Negron (Puerto Rico) Chiqui Soldevilla (Puerto Rico) Luis Gordillo	Mazda RX-7	**B**	72
48 DNF	GTU	7	(Puerto Rico) Juan Carlos Negron	(Puerto Rico) Juan Negron (Puerto Rico) Chiqui Soldevilla (Puerto Rico) Luis Gordillo	Mazda 1.3L Rotary	**B**	72
49 DNF	GTO	42	(United States) Bob Speed Products	(United States) Del Russo Taylor (United States) Mark Montgomery	Pontiac Firebird	**G**	58
49 DNF	GTO	42	(United States) Bob Speed Products	(United States) Del Russo Taylor (United States) Mark Montgomery	Pontiac 6.0L V8 N/A	**G**	58
50 DNF	GTO	46	(United States) Team Gulfwind	(United States) Daniel Urrutia (United States) Gene Whipp (United States) Gary Smith	Chevrolet Camaro	**G**	20
50 DNF	GTO	46	(United States) Team Gulfwind	(United States) Daniel Urrutia (United States) Gene Whipp (United States) Gary Smith	Chevrolet 5.7L V8 N/A	**G**	20
51 DNF	Lights	58	(United States) Gary Wonzer Racing	(United States) Bill Bean (United States) Nort Northam (United States) Gary Wonzer (United States) Bruce Westcott	Lola T616	**HO**	19
51 DNF	Lights	58	(United States) Gary Wonzer Racing	(United States) Bill Bean (United States) Nort Northam (United States) Gary Wonzer (United States) Bruce Westcott	Mazda 1.3L 2 Rotor	**HO**	19
52 DNF	GTP	84	(United States) Electramotive Engineering	(Netherlands) Arie Luyendyk (United States) Chip Robinson (Australia) Geoff Brabham	Nissan GTP ZX-Turbo	**G**	14
52 DNF	GTP	84	(United States) Electramotive Engineering	(Netherlands) Arie Luyendyk (United States) Chip Robinson (Australia) Geoff Brabham	Nissan 3.0L V6 Turbo	**G**	14
53	GTP	39	(United States) Phoenix Race Cars	(United States) John Gunn (United States) Chip Mead (United States) Gary Belcher	Phoenix JG2	**G**	10
53	GTP	39	(United States) Phoenix Race Cars	(United States) John Gunn (United States) Chip Mead (United States) Gary Belcher	Chevrolet 5.0L V8 N/A	**G**	10
DNS	GTP	99	(United States) All American Racers	(United States) Willy T. Ribbs (Argentina) Juan Manuel Fangio II	Eagle HF89	**G**	0
DNS	GTP	99	(United States) All American Racers	(United States) Willy T. Ribbs (Argentina) Juan Manuel Fangio II	Toyota 2.1L I4 Turbo	**G**	0
DNS	GTU	00	(United States) Full Time Racing	(United States) Kal Showket (United States) Neil Hanneman	Dodge Daytona	**Y**	0
DNS	GTU	00	(United States) Full Time Racing	(United States) Kal Showket (United States) Neil Hanneman	Dodge I4 N/A	**Y**	0
DNS	GTO	23	(United States) Raul Garcia	(United States) Raul Garcia	Pontiac Firebird	?	0
DNS	GTO	23	(United States) Raul Garcia	(United States) Raul Garcia	?	?	0
