= 1950 in motorsport =

The following is an overview of the events of 1950 in motorsport including the major racing events, motorsport venues that were opened and closed during a year, championships and non-championship events that were established and disestablished in a year, and births and deaths of racing drivers and other motorsport people.

== Annual events ==
The calendar includes only annual major non-championship events or annual events that had significance separate from the championship. For the dates of the championship events see related season articles.

Date	Event	Ref
21 May	11th Monaco Grand Prix	
30 May	34th Indianapolis 500	
5–9 June	32nd Isle of Man TT	
24–25 June	18th 24 Hours of Le Mans	

== Births ==
Date	Month	Name	Nationality	Occupation	Note	Ref
29	January	Jody Scheckter	South African	Racing driver	Formula One World Champion (1979).	
9	March	Danny Sullivan	American	Racing driver	Indianapolis 500 winner (1985).	
7	April	Franz Wittmann Sr.	Austrian	Rally driver	Rally New Zealand winner (1987)	
11	September	Barry Sheene	British	Motorcycle racer	500cc Grand Prix motorcycle racing World champion (1976-1977).	

== Deaths ==
Date	Month	Name	Age	Nationality	Occupation	Note	Ref
29	July	Joe Fry	34	British	Racing driver	One of the first British Formula One drivers.	
10	September	Raymond Sommer	44	French	Racing driver	24 Hours of Le Mans winner (1932, 1933).	

== See also ==
- List of 1950 motorsport champions
