= Dave Helmick =

American sports car racer and owner (died 2019)

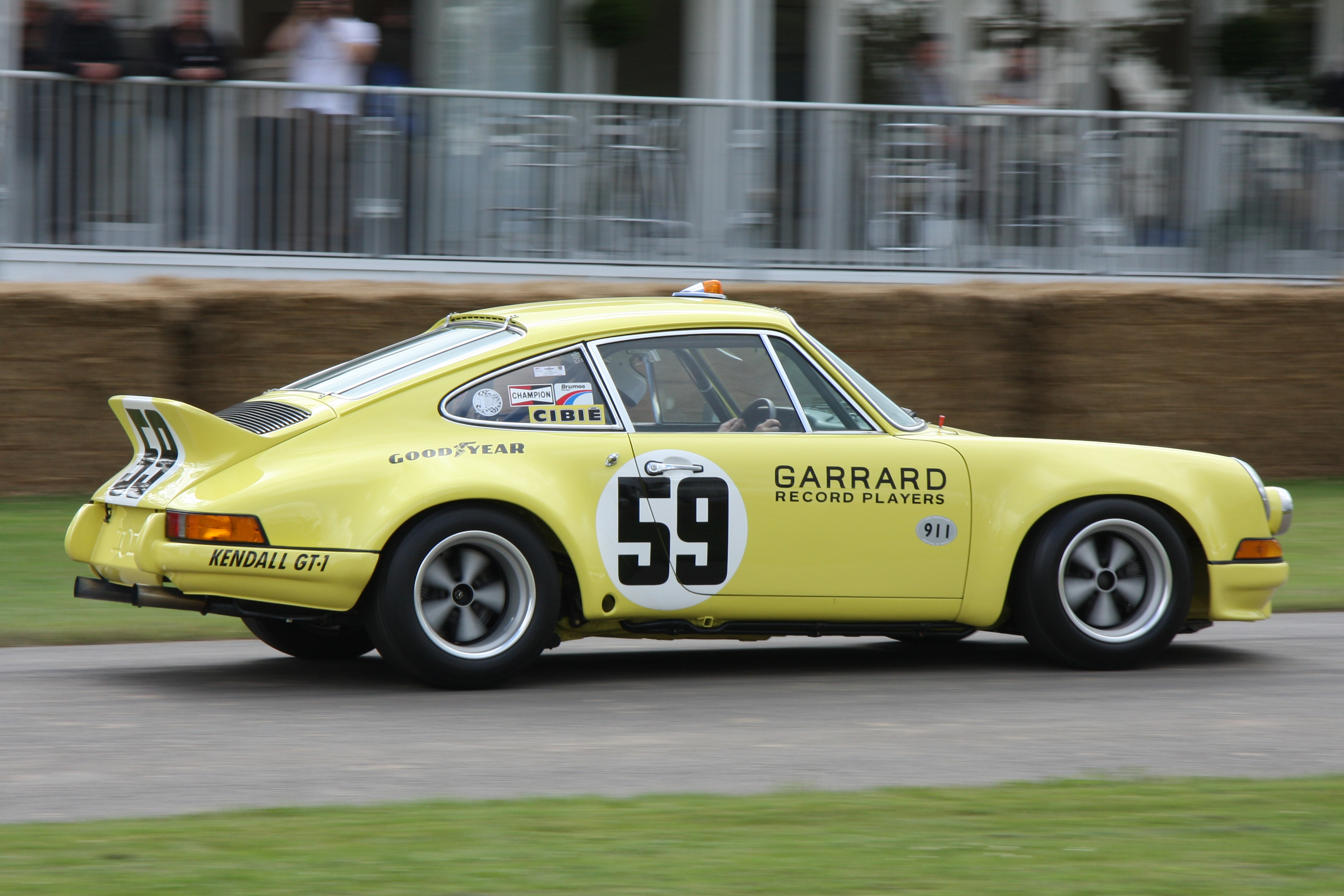
Dave Helmick's Porsche Carrera RSR, with which he won the 1973 12 Hours of Sebring alongside Peter Gregg and Hurley Haywood.

Dave Helmick was an American sports car racer and owner.

Helmick trained as a military doctor but later worked as a race doctor. He served as the race doctor for Ford's sportscar team in Europe, including for the 1966 24 Hours of Le Mans.

Helmick won the 1973 12 Hours of Sebring in a privateer Porsche 911 alongside Peter Gregg and Hurley Haywood.

Helmick, John Graves, and Haywood won the 1977 24 Hours of Daytona in a two-year-old Porsche Carrera RSR entered as "Ecurie Escargot." Haywood would have normally driven for a factory-supported team but was wary of the reliability the new turbocharged Porsche 934 and Porsche 935 entries they were fielding. He elected to drive with the underfunded Escargot team with their naturally aspirated Carrera. Helmick drove in other notable sports car races of the day such as the 12 Hours of Sebring in the World Championship of Makes.

Helmick was a radiologist by trade. After he retired from both his practice and from racing, he lived in Phoenix, Arizona. He died in May 2019.
