= 1988 12 Hours of Sebring =

Endurance auto race

The 12 Hours of Sebring Grand Prix of Endurance, was the third round of the 1988 IMSA GT Championship and was held at the Sebring International Raceway, on March 19, 1988. Victory overall went to the No. 86 Bayside Disposal Racing Porsche 962 driven by Klaus Ludwig and Hans-Joachim Stuck.

== Race results ==
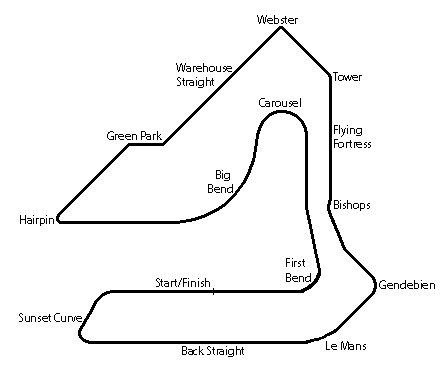
Sebring in 1988

Class winners in bold.

Pos	Class	No	Team	Drivers	Chassis	Tyre	Laps
Pos	Class	No	Team	Drivers	Engine	Tyre	Laps
1	**GTP**	**86**	(United States) **Bayside Disposal Racing**	(Germany) **Klaus Ludwig** (Germany) **Hans-Joachim Stuck**	**Porsche 962**	**G**	**318**
1	**GTP**	**86**	(United States) **Bayside Disposal Racing**	(Germany) **Klaus Ludwig** (Germany) **Hans-Joachim Stuck**	**Porsche 3.0L Flat 6 Turbo**	**G**	**318**
2	GTP	0	(Germany) Joest Racing	(Germany) "John Winter" (Germany) Frank Jelinski (Italy) Paolo Barilla	Porsche 962	**G**	309
2	GTP	0	(Germany) Joest Racing	(Germany) "John Winter" (Germany) Frank Jelinski (Italy) Paolo Barilla	Porsche 3.0L Flat 6 Turbo	**G**	309
3	GTP	16	(United States) Dyson Racing	(United States) Price Cobb (United Kingdom) James Weaver	Porsche 962	**G**	307
3	GTP	16	(United States) Dyson Racing	(United States) Price Cobb (United Kingdom) James Weaver	Porsche 3.0L Flat 6 Turbo	**G**	307
4	GTP	1	(United States) A. J. Foyt Enterprises	(United States) A. J. Foyt (United States) Hurley Haywood	Porsche 962	**G**	304
4	GTP	1	(United States) A. J. Foyt Enterprises	(United States) A. J. Foyt (United States) Hurley Haywood	Porsche 3.0L Flat 6 Turbo	**G**	304
5	GTP	10	(United States) Hotchkis Racing	(United States) Jim Adams (United States) John Hotchkis (United States) John Hotchkis Jr.	Porsche 962	**G**	303
5	GTP	10	(United States) Hotchkis Racing	(United States) Jim Adams (United States) John Hotchkis (United States) John Hotchkis Jr.	Porsche 3.0L Flat 6 Turbo	**G**	303
6	**GTO**	**5**	(United States) **Protofab Racing**	(United States) **Wally Dallenbach Jr.** (Canada) **John Jones**	**Chevrolet Corvette**	**G**	**289**
6	**GTO**	**5**	(United States) **Protofab Racing**	(United States) **Wally Dallenbach Jr.** (Canada) **John Jones**	**Chevrolet 5.8L V8 N/A**	**G**	**289**
7	GTP	61	(United Kingdom) Castrol Jaguar Racing	(Netherlands) Jan Lammers (United States) Davy Jones (United States) Danny Sullivan (Denmark) John Nielsen	Jaguar XJR-9	**D**	283
7	GTP	61	(United Kingdom) Castrol Jaguar Racing	(Netherlands) Jan Lammers (United States) Davy Jones (United States) Danny Sullivan (Denmark) John Nielsen	Jaguar 6.0L V12 N/A	**D**	283
8	GTO	6	(United States) Roush Racing	(United States) Lyn St. James (United States) Deborah Gregg	Merkur XR4Ti	**G**	282
8	GTO	6	(United States) Roush Racing	(United States) Lyn St. James (United States) Deborah Gregg	Ford 2.5L I4 Turbo	**G**	282
9	**Lights**	**9**	(United States) **Essex Racing**	(United States) **David Loring** (United States) **Tom Hessert**	**Tiga GT286**	**G**	**282**
9	**Lights**	**9**	(United States) **Essex Racing**	(United States) **David Loring** (United States) **Tom Hessert**	**Buick 3.0L V6 N/A**	**G**	**282**
10	GTO	33	(United States) Roush Racing	(United States) Les Delano (United States) Andy Petery (United States) Craig Carter	Mercury Capri	?	278
10	GTO	33	(United States) Roush Racing	(United States) Les Delano (United States) Andy Petery (United States) Craig Carter	Ford 6.0L N/A	?	278
11	GTO	11	(United States) Roush Racing	(United States) Scott Pruett (United States) Pete Halsmer	Merkur XR4Ti	**G**	275
11	GTO	11	(United States) Roush Racing	(United States) Scott Pruett (United States) Pete Halsmer	Ford V8 N/A	**G**	275
12	GTO	76	(United States) Clayton Cunningham Racing	(United States) John Morton (United States) P. J. Jones	Mazda RX-7	**F**	273
12	GTO	76	(United States) Clayton Cunningham Racing	(United States) John Morton (United States) P. J. Jones	Mazda 3 Rotor	**F**	273
13	Lights	40	(United States) Gaston Audrey Racing	(Canada) Uli Bieri (Switzerland) Angelo Pallavicini (Italy) Paolo Guatamacchia (Italy) Martino Finotto	Tiga GT286	**G**	269
13	Lights	40	(United States) Gaston Audrey Racing	(Canada) Uli Bieri (Switzerland) Angelo Pallavicini (Italy) Paolo Guatamacchia (Italy) Martino Finotto	Ferrari 3.0L V8 N/A	**G**	269
14 DNF	Lights	63	(United States) Jim Downing	(United States) Jim Downing (United States) Howard Katz (Japan) Hiro Matsushita	Argo JM19	**G**	268
14 DNF	Lights	63	(United States) Jim Downing	(United States) Jim Downing (United States) Howard Katz (Japan) Hiro Matsushita	Mazda 1.3L 2 Rotor	**G**	268
15	**GTU**	**71**	(United States) **Team Highball**	(United States) **Dennis Shaw** (United States) **Amos Johnson**	**Mazda RX-7**	**Y**	**267**
15	**GTU**	**71**	(United States) **Team Highball**	(United States) **Dennis Shaw** (United States) **Amos Johnson**	**Mazda 1.3L 2 Rotor**	**Y**	**267**
16	GTO	38	(United States) Mandeville Auto Tech	(United States) Roger Mandeville (United States) Kelly Marsh (United States) Don Marsh	Mazda RX-7	**Y**	266
16	GTO	38	(United States) Mandeville Auto Tech	(United States) Roger Mandeville (United States) Kelly Marsh (United States) Don Marsh	Mazda 1.9L 3 Rotor	**Y**	266
17	GTU	75	(United States) Clayton Cunningham Racing	(United States) Bart Kendall (United States) Tom Frank	Mazda RX-7	**F**	265
17	GTU	75	(United States) Clayton Cunningham Racing	(United States) Bart Kendall (United States) Tom Frank	Mazda 2 Rotor	**F**	265
18	Lights	80	(United States) Gaston Andrey Racing	(Italy) Martino Finotto (Italy) Ruggero Melgrati (Italy) Guido Daccò	Alba AR6	**G**	264
18	Lights	80	(United States) Gaston Andrey Racing	(Italy) Martino Finotto (Italy) Ruggero Melgrati (Italy) Guido Daccò	Ferrari 3.0L V8 N/A	**G**	264
19	GTP	09	(United States) Ball Bros. Racing	(United States) Steve Durst (United States) Mike Brockman (United States) Jeff Kline	Spice SE88P	?	262
19	GTP	09	(United States) Ball Bros. Racing	(United States) Steve Durst (United States) Mike Brockman (United States) Jeff Kline	Pontiac 4.5L V6 N/A	?	262
20	GTU	82	(United States) Dick Greer Racing	(United States) Dick Greer (United States) Matt Mnich (United States) John Finger (United States) Mike Mees	Mazda RX-7	**Y**	261
20	GTU	82	(United States) Dick Greer Racing	(United States) Dick Greer (United States) Matt Mnich (United States) John Finger (United States) Mike Mees	Mazda 2 Rotor	**Y**	261
21	Lights	23	(United States) Di-Tech Buick	(United States) Rex McDaniel (United States) George Petrilak (United States) Scott Livingston	Argo JM16	?	259
21	Lights	23	(United States) Di-Tech Buick	(United States) Rex McDaniel (United States) George Petrilak (United States) Scott Livingston	Buick 3.0L V6 N/A	?	259
22	Lights	55	(United States) Huffaker Racing	(United States) Paul Lewis (United States) Terry Visger (United States) Jon Woodner	Spice SE86CL	**F**	251
22	Lights	55	(United States) Huffaker Racing	(United States) Paul Lewis (United States) Terry Visger (United States) Jon Woodner	Pontiac 3.0L I4 N/A	**F**	251
23	GTU	53	(United States) Team Shelby	(United States) Jack Broomall (United States) Tim Evans (United States) Garth Ullom	Dodge Daytona	?	250
23	GTU	53	(United States) Team Shelby	(United States) Jack Broomall (United States) Tim Evans (United States) Garth Ullom	?	?	250
24	GTO	94	(United States) Ash Tisdelle	(United States) Ash Tisdelle (United States) Lance van Every (United States) Nort Northam	Chevrolet Camaro	?	232
24	GTO	94	(United States) Ash Tisdelle	(United States) Ash Tisdelle (United States) Lance van Every (United States) Nort Northam	?	?	232
25	GTU	20	(United States) Martinelli-Scott	(United States) Jack Refenning (United States) Rusty Bond (United States) Freddy Baker	Porsche 911 Carrera	**G**	232
25	GTU	20	(United States) Martinelli-Scott	(United States) Jack Refenning (United States) Rusty Bond (United States) Freddy Baker	Porsche Flat 6 N/A	**G**	232
26 DNF	Lights	19	(United States) Essex Racing Services	(United States) Bill Jacobson (United States) John Schneider (United States) Jim Brown	Tiga GT286	**G**	229
26 DNF	Lights	19	(United States) Essex Racing Services	(United States) Bill Jacobson (United States) John Schneider (United States) Jim Brown	Mazda 1.3L 2 Rotor	**G**	229
27	Lights	01	(United States) Spice Engineering USA	(United States) Charles Morgan (United States) Don Bell (Netherlands) Hendrik ten Cate	Spice SE87L	**G**	229
27	Lights	01	(United States) Spice Engineering USA	(United States) Charles Morgan (United States) Don Bell (Netherlands) Hendrik ten Cate	Pontiac 3.0L I4 N/A	**G**	229
28	GTO	84	(United States) Car Enterprises	(United States) Craig Rubright (United States) Kermit Upton	Chevrolet Camaro	?	229
28	GTO	84	(United States) Car Enterprises	(United States) Craig Rubright (United States) Kermit Upton	Chevrolet V8 N/A	?	229
29	GTU	89	(United States) 901 Racing	(United States) Peter Uria (United States) Larry Figaro (United States) Skip Winfree	Porsche 911 Carrera RSR	**G**	226
29	GTU	89	(United States) 901 Racing	(United States) Peter Uria (United States) Larry Figaro (United States) Skip Winfree	Porsche Flat 6 N/A	**G**	226
30 DNF	GTO	03	(United States) Skoal Bandit Racing	(United States) Buz McCall (United States) Paul Dallenbach (United States) Jack Baldwin	Chevrolet Camaro	**G**	225
30 DNF	GTO	03	(United States) Skoal Bandit Racing	(United States) Buz McCall (United States) Paul Dallenbach (United States) Jack Baldwin	Chevrolet 5.7L V8 N/A	**G**	225
31	GTU	54	(United States) SP Racing	(United States) Bill Auberlen (United States) Adrian Gang (United States) Gary Auberlen	Porsche 911 Carrera	**G**	224
31	GTU	54	(United States) SP Racing	(United States) Bill Auberlen (United States) Adrian Gang (United States) Gary Auberlen	Porsche Flat 6 N/A	**G**	224
32	GTU	17	(United States) Al Bacon Performance	(United States) Bob Reed (United States) Al Bacon (United States) Amos Johnson	Mazda RX-7	**F**	217
32	GTU	17	(United States) Al Bacon Performance	(United States) Bob Reed (United States) Al Bacon (United States) Amos Johnson	Mazda 2 Rotor	**F**	217
33	GTU	90	(Canada) Rudy Bartling	(Canada) Rudy Bartling (Canada) Rainer Brezinka (Canada) Fritz Hochreuter	Porsche 911	**G**	217
33	GTU	90	(Canada) Rudy Bartling	(Canada) Rudy Bartling (Canada) Rainer Brezinka (Canada) Fritz Hochreuter	Porsche Flat 6 N/A	**G**	217
34	Lights	42	(United States) Lamas Motor Racing	(United States) Howard Cherry (Canada) Charles Monk (United States) Lorenzo Lamas (United States) Jack Newsum (United States) Tim McAdam	Fabcar CL	**G**	212
34	Lights	42	(United States) Lamas Motor Racing	(United States) Howard Cherry (Canada) Charles Monk (United States) Lorenzo Lamas (United States) Jack Newsum (United States) Tim McAdam	Porsche 3.0L Flat 6 N/A	**G**	212
35	GTO	92	(United States) Bob's Speed Product	(United States) Del Russo Taylor (United States) Bob Lee (United States) Gary Myers (United States) Mark Montgomery	Pontiac Firebird	?	205
35	GTO	92	(United States) Bob's Speed Product	(United States) Del Russo Taylor (United States) Bob Lee (United States) Gary Myers (United States) Mark Montgomery	?	?	205
36	GTO	7	(United States) Highlands Race Team	(United States) Steve Roberts (United States) J. Kurt Roehrig	Pontiac Firebird	?	197
36	GTO	7	(United States) Highlands Race Team	(United States) Steve Roberts (United States) J. Kurt Roehrig	?	?	197
37	GTU	00	(United States) Full Time Racing	(United States) Kal Showket (United States) Neil Hanneman	Dodge Daytona	?	183
37	GTU	00	(United States) Full Time Racing	(United States) Kal Showket (United States) Neil Hanneman	Dodge I4 N/A	?	183
38	GTO	69	(United States) Greg Walker Racing	(United States) Greg Walker (United States) Scott Lagasse (United States) King Smith	Chevrolet Corvette	**G**	174
38	GTO	69	(United States) Greg Walker Racing	(United States) Greg Walker (United States) Scott Lagasse (United States) King Smith	Chevrolet V8 N/A	**G**	174
39 DNF	GTP	49	(United States) HP Racing	(United States) Doc Bundy (United States) Whitney Ganz (United States) Bill Cooper	March 86G	?	173
39 DNF	GTP	49	(United States) HP Racing	(United States) Doc Bundy (United States) Whitney Ganz (United States) Bill Cooper	?	?	173
40	GTO	81	(United States) Sentry Bank Equipment	(United States) Ken Bupp (United States) Guy Church (Canada) Robert Peters	Chevrolet Camaro	**G**	168
40	GTO	81	(United States) Sentry Bank Equipment	(United States) Ken Bupp (United States) Guy Church (Canada) Robert Peters	Chevrolet V8 N/A	**G**	168
41 DNF	GTO	12	(United States) Spirit of Brandon	(United States) Henry Brosnaham (United States) Kent Keller	Chevrolet Camaro	?	161
41 DNF	GTO	12	(United States) Spirit of Brandon	(United States) Henry Brosnaham (United States) Kent Keller	Chevrolet V8 N/A	?	161
42	GTU	18	(United States) Simms-Romano Enterprises	(United States) Paul Romano (United States) Bill McVey (United States) Robert Seaman (United States) William Hornack	Mazda RX-7	**F**	161
42	GTU	18	(United States) Simms-Romano Enterprises	(United States) Paul Romano (United States) Bill McVey (United States) Robert Seaman (United States) William Hornack	Mazda 2 Rotor	**F**	161
43 DNF	GTP	22	(United States) Hendrick Motorsports	(South Africa) Sarel van der Merwe (United States) Elliot Forbes-Robinson	Chevrolet Corvette GTP	**G**	151
43 DNF	GTP	22	(United States) Hendrick Motorsports	(South Africa) Sarel van der Merwe (United States) Elliot Forbes-Robinson	Chevrolet 3.0L V6 Turbo	**G**	151
44 DNF	GTU	50	(United States) Marco Polo Motorsports	(United States) Dan Ripley (United States) Alan Freed (United States) Keith Rinzler	Pontiac Fiero	?	145
44 DNF	GTU	50	(United States) Marco Polo Motorsports	(United States) Dan Ripley (United States) Alan Freed (United States) Keith Rinzler	?	?	145
45 DNF	GTU	02	(United States) C&C Inc.	(United States) Tommy Kendall (United States) Max Jones	Chevrolet Beretta	**G**	145
45 DNF	GTU	02	(United States) C&C Inc.	(United States) Tommy Kendall (United States) Max Jones	?	**G**	145
46 DNF	GTP	14	(United States) Holbert Racing	(United States) Chip Robinson (United States) Al Holbert	Porsche 962	**G**	142
46 DNF	GTP	14	(United States) Holbert Racing	(United States) Chip Robinson (United States) Al Holbert	Porsche 3.0L Flat 6 Turbo	**G**	142
47 DNF	GTP	26	(United States) Hi-Tech Racing	(United States) Richard McDill (United States) Tom Juckette (United States) Bill McDill	March 84G	?	142
47 DNF	GTP	26	(United States) Hi-Tech Racing	(United States) Richard McDill (United States) Tom Juckette (United States) Bill McDill	?	?	142
48 DNF	Lights	97	(United States) Whitehall Motorsports	(France) Claude Ballot-Léna (France) Jean-Louis Ricci (United States) Skeeter McKitterick	Spice SE88P	?	141
48 DNF	Lights	97	(United States) Whitehall Motorsports	(France) Claude Ballot-Léna (France) Jean-Louis Ricci (United States) Skeeter McKitterick	Pontiac 3.0L I4 N/A	?	141
49 DNF	GTP	30	(Italy) Momo Racing	(Republic of Ireland) Michael Roe (Italy) Giampiero Moretti	March 86G	**G**	135
49 DNF	GTP	30	(Italy) Momo Racing	(Republic of Ireland) Michael Roe (Italy) Giampiero Moretti	Buick 3.0L V6 Turbo	**G**	135
50 DNF	GTO	2	(United States) Protofab Racing	(United States) Greg Pickett (United States) Tommy Riggins	Chevrolet Corvette	**G**	126
50 DNF	GTO	2	(United States) Protofab Racing	(United States) Greg Pickett (United States) Tommy Riggins	?	**G**	126
51 DNF	Lights	4	(United States) S&L Racing	(United States) Jim Miller (United States) Linda Ludemann (United States) Scott Schubot	Spice SE88P	?	117
51 DNF	Lights	4	(United States) S&L Racing	(United States) Jim Miller (United States) Linda Ludemann (United States) Scott Schubot	Buick 3.0L V6 N/A	?	117
52 DNF	Lights	06	(United States) Bobby Brown Racing	(United States) Bobby Brown (United States) Billy Hagan (United States) Ron Nelson	Tiga GT286	**G**	102
52 DNF	Lights	06	(United States) Bobby Brown Racing	(United States) Bobby Brown (United States) Billy Hagan (United States) Ron Nelson	?	**G**	102
53 DNF	GTU	68	(Dominican Republic) Latino Racing	(Dominican Republic) Luis Mendez (Costa Rica) Kikos Fonseca	Porsche 911 Carrera RSR	**F**	100
53 DNF	GTU	68	(Dominican Republic) Latino Racing	(Dominican Republic) Luis Mendez (Costa Rica) Kikos Fonseca	Porsche Flat 6 N/A	**F**	100
54 DNF	GTO	98	(United States) All American Racers	(United States) Dennis Aase (United States) Chris Cord	Toyota Celica	**G**	99
54 DNF	GTO	98	(United States) All American Racers	(United States) Dennis Aase (United States) Chris Cord	Toyota 2.1L I4 Turbo	**G**	99
55 DNF	Lights	57	(United States) Wonzer Racing	(United States) Bill Bean (United States) Gary Wonzer (United States) Mike Cooper	Lola T616	?	93
55 DNF	Lights	57	(United States) Wonzer Racing	(United States) Bill Bean (United States) Gary Wonzer (United States) Mike Cooper	Mazda 1.3L 2 Rotor	?	93
56 DNF	GTO	41	(United States) Ferrea Racing	(United States) Luis Sereix (United States) Daniel Urrutia	Chevrolet Camaro	?	88
56 DNF	GTO	41	(United States) Ferrea Racing	(United States) Luis Sereix (United States) Daniel Urrutia	Chevrolet V8 N/A	?	88
57 DNF	GTP	72	(United Kingdom) Roy Baker Racing	(United States) Lon Bender (United States) Albert Naon Jr.	Tiga GC286	?	81
57 DNF	GTP	72	(United Kingdom) Roy Baker Racing	(United States) Lon Bender (United States) Albert Naon Jr.	Ford V8 N/A	?	81
58 DNF	GTP	39	(United States) Phoenix Race Cars	(United States) John Gunn (United States) Gary Belcher	Phoenix JG2	**G**	63
58 DNF	GTP	39	(United States) Phoenix Race Cars	(United States) John Gunn (United States) Gary Belcher	Chevrolet V8 N/A	**G**	63
59 DNF	GTU	47	(United States) Cumberland Valley Racing	(United States) Richard Oakley (Canada) Doug Mills	Mazda RX-7	**F**	37
59 DNF	GTU	47	(United States) Cumberland Valley Racing	(United States) Richard Oakley (Canada) Doug Mills	Mazda 2 Rotor	**F**	37
60 DNF	GTP	60	(United Kingdom) Castrol Jaguar Racing	(United Kingdom) Martin Brundle (Denmark) John Nielsen (Brazil) Raul Boesel	Jaguar XJR-9	**D**	31
60 DNF	GTP	60	(United Kingdom) Castrol Jaguar Racing	(United Kingdom) Martin Brundle (Denmark) John Nielsen (Brazil) Raul Boesel	Jaguar 6.0L V12 N/A	**D**	31
61 DNF	GTU	07	(United States) Full Time Racing	(United States) Dorsey Schroeder (United States) Bruce MacInnes	Dodge Daytona	?	25
61 DNF	GTU	07	(United States) Full Time Racing	(United States) Dorsey Schroeder (United States) Bruce MacInnes	Dodge 2.2L I4 N/A	?	25
62 DNF	GTP	15	(United States) John Kalagian Racing	(United States) Jim Rothbarth (Mexico) Bernard Jourdain	Porsche 962	**G**	21
62 DNF	GTP	15	(United States) John Kalagian Racing	(United States) Jim Rothbarth (Mexico) Bernard Jourdain	Porsche 3.0L Flat 6 Turbo	**G**	21
63 DNF	GTO	99	(United States) All American Racers	(United States) Willy T. Ribbs (Argentina) Juan Manuel Fangio II	Toyota Celica	**G**	16
63 DNF	GTO	99	(United States) All American Racers	(United States) Willy T. Ribbs (Argentina) Juan Manuel Fangio II	Toyota 2.1L I4 Turbo	**G**	16
64 DNF	GTP	31	(Italy) Momo Racing	(United States) Tom Gloy (Belgium) Didier Theys (United States) Steve Phillips	March 86G	**G**	2
64 DNF	GTP	31	(Italy) Momo Racing	(United States) Tom Gloy (Belgium) Didier Theys (United States) Steve Phillips	Buick 4.5L V6 N/A	**G**	2
65 DNF	Lights	48	(United States) Lamas Motor Racing	(United States) Chip Mead (United States) Lorenzo Lamas (United States) Tim McAdam	Fabcar CL	**G**	2
65 DNF	Lights	48	(United States) Lamas Motor Racing	(United States) Chip Mead (United States) Lorenzo Lamas (United States) Tim McAdam	Porsche 3.0L Flat 6 N/A	**G**	2
DNS	GTU	56	(United States) Karl Durkheimer	(United States) Karl Durkheimer (United States) Jim Torres	Porsche 911 Carrera	**G**	0
DNS	GTU	56	(United States) Karl Durkheimer	(United States) Karl Durkheimer (United States) Jim Torres	Porsche Flat 6 N/A	**G**	0
DNS	Lights	58	(United States) Wonzer Racing	(United States) Paul Goral (United States) Brian Cameron (United States) Gary Wonzer (United States) Peter Argetsinger	Lola T616	?	0
DNS	Lights	58	(United States) Wonzer Racing	(United States) Paul Goral (United States) Brian Cameron (United States) Gary Wonzer (United States) Peter Argetsinger	Mazda 1.3L 2 Rotor	?	0
DNS	GTP	96	(United States) Mahre Brothers	(United States) Phil Mahre (United States) Steve Mahre	URD C82	?	0
DNS	GTP	96	(United States) Mahre Brothers	(United States) Phil Mahre (United States) Steve Mahre	?	?	0
DNS	GTO	45	(United States) Karl Keck	(United States) Mark Kennedy (United States) Karl Keck	Chevrolet Corvette	?	0
DNS	GTO	45	(United States) Karl Keck	(United States) Mark Kennedy (United States) Karl Keck	Chevrolet V8 N/A	?	0
DNS	GTU	28	(United States) Guy W. Church	(United States) Russ Church (United States) E. J. Generotti (United States) Guy Church	Mazda RX-7	?	0
DNS	GTU	28	(United States) Guy W. Church	(United States) Russ Church (United States) E. J. Generotti (United States) Guy Church	Mazda 2 Rotor	?	0
DNS	GTU	51	(United States) HP Racing	(United States) Bob Copeman (United States) Joe Philips	Porsche 911 Carrera RSR	?	0
DNS	GTU	51	(United States) HP Racing	(United States) Bob Copeman (United States) Joe Philips	Porsche Flat 6 N/A	?	0
DNQ	GTO	66	(United States) Chaunce Wallace	(United States) Chaunce Wallace (United States) Warren Newell	Chevrolet Camaro	?	0
DNQ	GTO	66	(United States) Chaunce Wallace	(United States) Chaunce Wallace (United States) Warren Newell	Chevrolet V8 N/A	?	0
DNQ	GTU	46	(United States) Red Line Racing	(United States) Mike Guido (United States) Mike Graham (United States) Alan Crouch	BMW 325i	?	0
DNQ	GTU	46	(United States) Red Line Racing	(United States) Mike Guido (United States) Mike Graham (United States) Alan Crouch	BMW 2.5L I6 N/A	?	0
