= Andy Evans (racing driver) =

American racing driver

- Born: Andrew Lovelace Evans; June 27, 1951 (age 75) Pomona, California, US
- Retired: 1997

24 Hours of Le Mans IMSA World Sports Car Championship
- Years active: 1993–1997
- Teams: Scandia Racing, Kremer Porsche, Courage Compétition

Previous series
- 1990–93: IMSA Lights

Andrew Lovelace Evans (born June 27, 1951) is an American auto racing driver and team owner. As a driver, he won the 1995 and 1997 12 Hours of Sebring. He owned Scandia, an IndyCar and IMSA team.

In 1996, Evans and Roberto Muller bought the International Motor Sports Association, and changed its name to Professional Sports Car Racing (PSCR). He also bought controlling interests in the Sebring International Raceway and Mosport Park. Evans sold those assets to Don Panoz in 2001.

Before his racing career, Evans worked in the securities industry during the 1980s, but SEC rule violations and a conviction for bank fraud resulted in a ban from the industry. After serving his fraud sentence, he became personal investment advisor for Bill Gates, whom he had known previously. Gates replaced Evans as his advisor after a press report brought his past and their relationship to light.
