= 1992 Winston 500 =

Ninth race of the 1992 NASCAR Winston Cup Series

Race details
- Race 9 of 29 in the 1992 NASCAR Winston Cup Series
- The 1992 Winston 500 program cover, featuring Harry Gant.
- Date: May 3, 1992
- Official name: 23rd Annual Winston 500
- Location: Lincoln, Alabama, Talladega Superspeedway
- Course: Permanent racing facility
- Course length: 2.66 miles (4.28 km)
- Distance: 188 laps, 500.08 mi (804.8 km)
- Scheduled distance: 188 laps, 500.08 mi (804.8 km)
- Average speed: 167.609 miles per hour (269.741 km/h)
- Attendance: 142,500

Pole position
Driver	Ernie Irvan	Morgan-McClure Motorsports
- Time: 49.660

Most laps led
Driver	Davey Allison	Robert Yates Racing
- Laps: 110

Winner
No. 28	Davey Allison	Robert Yates Racing

Television in the United States
- Network: ESPN
- Announcers: Bob Jenkins, Ned Jarrett, Benny Parsons

Radio in the United States
- Radio: Motor Racing Network

The 1992 Winston 500 was the ninth stock car race of the 1992 NASCAR Winston Cup Series season and the 23rd iteration of the event. The race was held on Sunday, May 2, 1992, before an audience of 142,500 in Lincoln, Alabama at Talladega Superspeedway, a 2.66 miles (4.28 km) permanent triangle-shaped superspeedway. The race took the scheduled 188 laps to complete. At race's end, Robert Yates Racing driver Davey Allison would manage to dominate the late stages of the race to take his 16th career NASCAR Winston Cup Series victory and his third victory of the season. To fill out the top three, Junior Johnson & Associates driver Bill Elliott and Richard Childress Racing driver Dale Earnhardt would finish second and third, respectively.

== Background ==
The layout of Talladega Superspeedway, the venue where the race was held.

Talladega Superspeedway, originally known as Alabama International Motor Superspeedway (AIMS), is a motorsports complex located north of Talladega, Alabama. It is located on the former Anniston Air Force Base in the small city of Lincoln. The track is a tri-oval and was constructed in the 1960s by the International Speedway Corporation, a business controlled by the France family. Talladega is most known for its steep banking and the unique location of the start/finish line that's located just past the exit to pit road. The track currently hosts the NASCAR series such as the NASCAR Cup Series, O'Reilly Auto Parts Series and the Truck Series. Talladega is the longest NASCAR oval, a 2.66-mile-long (4.28 km) tri-oval like the Daytona International Speedway, which also is a 2.5-mile-long (4.0 km) tri-oval.

=== Entry list ===
- (R) denotes rookie driver.

#	Driver	Team	Make
1	Rick Mast	Precision Products Racing	Oldsmobile
2	Rusty Wallace	Penske Racing South	Pontiac
3	Dale Earnhardt	Richard Childress Racing	Chevrolet
4	Ernie Irvan	Morgan–McClure Motorsports	Chevrolet
5	Ricky Rudd	Hendrick Motorsports	Chevrolet
6	Mark Martin	Roush Racing	Ford
7	Alan Kulwicki	AK Racing	Ford
8	Dick Trickle	Stavola Brothers Racing	Ford
9	Dave Mader III	Melling Racing	Ford
10	Derrike Cope	Whitcomb Racing	Chevrolet
11	Bill Elliott	Junior Johnson & Associates	Ford
12	Hut Stricklin	Bobby Allison Motorsports	Chevrolet
15	Geoff Bodine	Bud Moore Engineering	Ford
16	Wally Dallenbach Jr.	Roush Racing	Ford
17	Darrell Waltrip	Darrell Waltrip Motorsports	Chevrolet
18	Dale Jarrett	Joe Gibbs Racing	Chevrolet
21	Morgan Shepherd	Wood Brothers Racing	Ford
22	Sterling Marlin	Junior Johnson & Associates	Ford
25	Ken Schrader	Hendrick Motorsports	Chevrolet
26	Brett Bodine	King Racing	Ford
28	Davey Allison	Robert Yates Racing	Ford
30	Michael Waltrip	Bahari Racing	Pontiac
31	Bobby Hillin Jr.	Team Ireland	Chevrolet
33	Harry Gant	Leo Jackson Motorsports	Oldsmobile
41	Greg Sacks	Larry Hedrick Motorsports	Chevrolet
42	Kyle Petty	SABCO Racing	Pontiac
43	Richard Petty	Petty Enterprises	Pontiac
47	Buddy Baker	Close Racing	Chevrolet
49	Stanley Smith	BS&S Motorsports	Chevrolet
50	Clay Young	Clay Young Racing	Pontiac
52	Jimmy Means	Jimmy Means Racing	Pontiac
53	John McFadden	Jimmy Means Racing	Pontiac
55	Ted Musgrave	RaDiUs Motorsports	Oldsmobile
66	Jimmy Hensley (R)	Cale Yarborough Motorsports	Ford
68	Bobby Hamilton	TriStar Motorsports	Oldsmobile
71	Dave Marcis	Marcis Auto Racing	Chevrolet
90	Charlie Glotzbach	Donlavey Racing	Ford
94	Terry Labonte	Hagan Racing	Ford
95	Bob Schacht (R)	Sadler Brothers Racing	Oldsmobile
98	Jimmy Spencer	Travis Carter Enterprises	Chevrolet

== Qualifying ==
Qualifying was split into two rounds. The first round was held on Thursday, April 30, at 4:00 PM EST. Each driver would have one lap to set a time. During the first round, the top 20 drivers in the round would be guaranteed a starting spot in the race. If a driver was not able to guarantee a spot in the first round, they had the option to scrub their time from the first round and try and run a faster lap time in a second round qualifying run, held on Saturday, May 1, at 4:30 PM EST. As with the first round, each driver would have one lap to set a time. For this specific race, positions 21-40 would be decided on time, and depending on who needed it, a select amount of positions were given to cars who had not otherwise qualified but were high enough in owner's points; up to two were given. If needed, a past champion who did not qualify on either time or provisionals could use a champion's provisional, adding one more spot to the field.

Ernie Irvan, driving for Morgan–McClure Motorsports, won the pole, setting a time of 49.660 and an average speed of 192.831 mph (310.331 km/h) in the first round.

No drivers would fail to qualify.

=== Full qualifying results ===
Pos.	#	Driver	Team	Make	Time	Speed
1	4	Ernie Irvan	Morgan–McClure Motorsports	Chevrolet	49.660	192.831
2	28	Davey Allison	Robert Yates Racing	Ford	49.705	192.657
3	22	Sterling Marlin	Junior Johnson & Associates	Ford	49.868	192.027
4	5	Ricky Rudd	Hendrick Motorsports	Chevrolet	49.983	191.585
5	11	Bill Elliott	Junior Johnson & Associates	Ford	50.155	190.928
6	21	Morgan Shepherd	Wood Brothers Racing	Ford	50.308	190.347
7	94	Terry Labonte	Hagan Racing	Ford	50.349	190.192
8	26	Brett Bodine	King Racing	Ford	50.357	190.162
9	42	Kyle Petty	SABCO Racing	Pontiac	50.385	190.057
10	3	Dale Earnhardt	Richard Childress Racing	Chevrolet	50.451	189.808
11	16	Wally Dallenbach Jr.	Roush Racing	Ford	50.455	189.793
12	12	Hut Stricklin	Bobby Allison Motorsports	Chevrolet	50.498	189.631
13	55	Ted Musgrave	RaDiUs Motorsports	Chevrolet	50.523	189.537
14	1	Rick Mast	Precision Products Racing	Oldsmobile	50.563	189.387
15	18	Dale Jarrett	Joe Gibbs Racing	Chevrolet	50.565	189.380
16	66	Jimmy Hensley (R)	Cale Yarborough Motorsports	Ford	50.579	189.328
17	43	Richard Petty	Petty Enterprises	Pontiac	50.582	189.316
18	2	Rusty Wallace	Penske Racing South	Pontiac	50.666	189.002
19	90	Charlie Glotzbach	Donlavey Racing	Ford	50.738	188.734
20	7	Alan Kulwicki	AK Racing	Ford	50.759	188.656
Failed to lock in Round 1
21	6	Mark Martin	Roush Racing	Ford	50.003	191.509
22	49	Stanley Smith	BS&S Motorsports	Chevrolet	50.341	190.223
23	9	Dave Mader III	Melling Racing	Ford	50.384	190.060
24	33	Harry Gant	Leo Jackson Motorsports	Oldsmobile	50.764	188.638
25	30	Michael Waltrip	Bahari Racing	Pontiac	50.810	188.467
26	98	Jimmy Spencer	Travis Carter Enterprises	Chevrolet	50.811	188.463
27	31	Bobby Hillin Jr.	Team Ireland	Chevrolet	50.832	188.385
28	8	Dick Trickle	Stavola Brothers Racing	Ford	50.866	188.259
29	10	Derrike Cope	Whitcomb Racing	Chevrolet	50.870	188.245
30	41	Greg Sacks	Larry Hedrick Motorsports	Chevrolet	50.874	188.230
31	95	Bob Schacht (R)	Sadler Brothers Racing	Oldsmobile	50.927	188.034
32	15	Geoff Bodine	Bud Moore Engineering	Ford	50.928	188.030
33	17	Darrell Waltrip	Darrell Waltrip Motorsports	Chevrolet	51.024	187.676
34	68	Bobby Hamilton	TriStar Motorsports	Oldsmobile	51.240	186.885
35	25	Ken Schrader	Hendrick Motorsports	Chevrolet	51.401	186.300
36	47	Buddy Baker	Close Racing	Chevrolet	51.613	185.535
37	71	Dave Marcis	Marcis Auto Racing	Chevrolet	51.640	185.438
38	52	Jimmy Means	Jimmy Means Racing	Pontiac	51.831	184.754
39	50	Clay Young	Clay Young Racing	Pontiac	53.902	177.656
40	53	John McFadden	Jimmy Means Racing	Pontiac	-	-
Official first round qualifying results
Official starting lineup

== Race results ==
Fin	St	#	Driver	Team	Make	Laps	Led	Status	Pts	Winnings
1	2	28	Davey Allison	Robert Yates Racing	Ford	188	110	running	185	$189,325
2	5	11	Bill Elliott	Junior Johnson & Associates	Ford	188	4	running	175	$56,225
3	10	3	Dale Earnhardt	Richard Childress Racing	Chevrolet	188	10	running	170	$46,970
4	3	22	Sterling Marlin	Junior Johnson & Associates	Ford	188	57	running	165	$45,470
5	1	4	Ernie Irvan	Morgan–McClure Motorsports	Chevrolet	188	5	running	160	$35,840
6	20	7	Alan Kulwicki	AK Racing	Ford	188	0	running	150	$25,315
7	15	18	Dale Jarrett	Joe Gibbs Racing	Chevrolet	188	0	running	146	$19,215
8	21	6	Mark Martin	Roush Racing	Ford	188	2	running	147	$22,765
9	6	21	Morgan Shepherd	Wood Brothers Racing	Ford	188	0	running	138	$19,065
10	9	42	Kyle Petty	SABCO Racing	Pontiac	188	0	running	134	$17,665
11	18	2	Rusty Wallace	Penske Racing South	Pontiac	188	0	running	130	$18,530
12	29	10	Derrike Cope	Whitcomb Racing	Chevrolet	188	0	running	127	$15,050
13	32	15	Geoff Bodine	Bud Moore Engineering	Ford	188	0	running	124	$15,420
14	11	16	Wally Dallenbach Jr.	Roush Racing	Ford	188	0	running	121	$9,240
15	17	43	Richard Petty	Petty Enterprises	Pontiac	188	0	running	118	$14,660
16	8	26	Brett Bodine	King Racing	Ford	188	0	running	115	$14,070
17	14	1	Rick Mast	Precision Products Racing	Oldsmobile	188	0	running	112	$13,055
18	23	9	Dave Mader III	Melling Racing	Ford	188	0	running	109	$13,365
19	28	8	Dick Trickle	Stavola Brothers Racing	Ford	188	0	running	106	$12,325
20	34	68	Bobby Hamilton	TriStar Motorsports	Oldsmobile	187	0	running	103	$13,765
21	13	55	Ted Musgrave	RaDiUs Motorsports	Chevrolet	187	0	running	100	$11,650
22	12	12	Hut Stricklin	Bobby Allison Motorsports	Chevrolet	187	0	running	97	$11,430
23	35	25	Ken Schrader	Hendrick Motorsports	Chevrolet	187	0	running	94	$15,670
24	24	33	Harry Gant	Leo Jackson Motorsports	Oldsmobile	186	0	running	91	$16,565
25	16	66	Jimmy Hensley (R)	Cale Yarborough Motorsports	Ford	186	0	running	88	$8,340
26	4	5	Ricky Rudd	Hendrick Motorsports	Chevrolet	186	0	running	85	$16,005
27	37	71	Dave Marcis	Marcis Auto Racing	Chevrolet	184	0	running	82	$7,925
28	27	31	Bobby Hillin Jr.	Team Ireland	Chevrolet	182	0	running	79	$6,295
29	33	17	Darrell Waltrip	Darrell Waltrip Motorsports	Chevrolet	180	0	running	76	$15,640
30	31	95	Bob Schacht (R)	Sadler Brothers Racing	Oldsmobile	180	0	running	73	$6,185
31	36	47	Buddy Baker	Close Racing	Chevrolet	176	0	wheel bearing	70	$6,055
32	26	98	Jimmy Spencer	Travis Carter Enterprises	Chevrolet	175	0	suspension	67	$10,550
33	22	49	Stanley Smith	BS&S Motorsports	Chevrolet	116	0	crash	64	$5,970
34	38	52	Jimmy Means	Jimmy Means Racing	Pontiac	101	0	engine	61	$7,465
35	30	41	Greg Sacks	Larry Hedrick Motorsports	Chevrolet	92	0	engine	58	$5,910
36	7	94	Terry Labonte	Hagan Racing	Ford	77	0	engine	55	$10,380
37	19	90	Charlie Glotzbach	Donlavey Racing	Ford	75	0	crash	52	$5,800
38	25	30	Michael Waltrip	Bahari Racing	Pontiac	63	0	cylinder	49	$8,745
39	39	50	Clay Young	Clay Young Racing	Pontiac	40	0	engine	46	$5,690
40	40	53	John McFadden	Jimmy Means Racing	Pontiac	5	0	handling	43	$5,660
Official race results

== Standings after the race ==
Drivers' Championship standings

	Pos	Driver	Points
	1	Davey Allison	1,399
2	2	Bill Elliott	1,332 (-67)
1	3	Harry Gant	1,289 (-110)
1	4	Alan Kulwicki	1,281 (–118)
1	5	Morgan Shepherd	1,257 (–142)
1	6	Dale Earnhardt	1,240 (–159)
4	7	Terry Labonte	1,228 (–171)
	8	Geoff Bodine	1,176 (–223)
1	9	Mark Martin	1,148 (–251)
1	10	Dick Trickle	1,111 (–288)
Official driver's standings

- Note: Only the first 10 positions are included for the driver standings.

Previous race: 1992 Hanes 500	NASCAR Winston Cup Series; 1992 season	Next race: 1992 Coca-Cola 600
