= 1991 Miller Genuine Draft 500 =

16th race of the 1991 NASCAR Winston Cup Series

Race details
- Race 16 of 29 in the 1991 NASCAR Winston Cup Series
- The 1991 Miller Genuine Draft 500 program cover, featuring Rusty Wallace. Artwork by NASCAR artist Sam Bass.
- Date: July 21, 1991
- Official name: 19th Annual Miller Genuine Draft 500
- Location: Long Pond, Pennsylvania, Pocono Raceway
- Course: Permanent racing facility
- Course length: 2.5 miles (4.0 km)
- Distance: 179 laps, 447.5 mi (720.181 km)
- Scheduled distance: 200 laps, 500 mi (804.672 km)
- Average speed: 115.459 miles per hour (185.813 km/h)

Pole position
Driver	Alan Kulwicki	AK Racing
- Time: 55.737

Most laps led
Driver	Ernie Irvan	Morgan-McClure Motorsports
- Laps: 65

Winner
No. 2	Rusty Wallace	Penske Racing South

Television in the United States
- Network: ESPN
- Announcers: Bob Jenkins, Benny Parsons, Ned Jarrett

Radio in the United States
- Radio: Motor Racing Network

The 1991 Miller Genuine Draft 500 was the 16th stock car race of the 1991 NASCAR Winston Cup Series season and the 19th iteration of the event. The race was held on Sunday, July 21, 1991, in Long Pond, Pennsylvania, at Pocono Raceway, a 2.5 miles (4.0 km) triangular permanent course. The race was shortened from its scheduled 200 laps to 179 laps due to rain. In the final laps of the race, Penske Racing South driver Rusty Wallace would manage to conserve enough fuel to run until the last caution flag was given on lap 174. After the red flag was given out on lap 176, a two-hour rain delay would delay the restart. After the rain delay, NASCAR mandated that all drivers start their cars and run behind the pace car until lap 179, where NASCAR would declare the race official, handing Wallace the victory. The victory was Wallace's 20th career NASCAR Winston Cup Series victory and his second and final victory of the season. To fill out the top three, Roush Racing driver Mark Martin and Junior Johnson & Associates driver Geoff Bodine would finish second and third, respectively.

== Background ==
The layout of Pocono International Raceway, the venue where the race was held.

The race was held at Pocono International Raceway, which is a three-turn superspeedway located in Long Pond, Pennsylvania. The track hosts two annual NASCAR Sprint Cup Series races, as well as one Xfinity Series and Camping World Truck Series event. Until 2019, the track also hosted an IndyCar Series race.

Pocono International Raceway is one of a very few NASCAR tracks not owned by either Speedway Motorsports, Inc. or International Speedway Corporation. It is operated by the Igdalsky siblings Brandon, Nicholas, and sister Ashley, and cousins Joseph IV and Chase Mattioli, all of whom are third-generation members of the family-owned Mattco Inc, started by Joseph II and Rose Mattioli.

Outside of the NASCAR races, the track is used throughout the year by the Sports Car Club of America (SCCA) and motorcycle clubs as well as racing schools and an IndyCar race. The triangular oval also has three separate infield sections of racetrack – North Course, East Course and South Course. Each of these infield sections use a separate portion of the tri-oval to complete the track. During regular non-race weekends, multiple clubs can use the track by running on different infield sections. Also some of the infield sections can be run in either direction, or multiple infield sections can be put together – such as running the North Course and the South Course and using the tri-oval to connect the two.

=== Entry list ===
- (R) denotes rookie driver.

#	Driver	Team	Make
1	Rick Mast	Precision Products Racing	Oldsmobile
2	Rusty Wallace	Penske Racing South	Pontiac
3	Dale Earnhardt	Richard Childress Racing	Chevrolet
4	Ernie Irvan	Morgan–McClure Motorsports	Chevrolet
5	Ricky Rudd	Hendrick Motorsports	Chevrolet
6	Mark Martin	Roush Racing	Ford
7	Alan Kulwicki	AK Racing	Ford
8	Rick Wilson	Stavola Brothers Racing	Buick
9	Bill Elliott	Melling Racing	Ford
10	Derrike Cope	Whitcomb Racing	Chevrolet
11	Geoff Bodine	Junior Johnson & Associates	Ford
12	Hut Stricklin	Bobby Allison Motorsports	Buick
13	Gary Balough	Linro Motorsports	Buick
15	Morgan Shepherd	Bud Moore Engineering	Ford
17	Darrell Waltrip	Darrell Waltrip Motorsports	Chevrolet
19	Chad Little	Little Racing	Ford
21	Dale Jarrett	Wood Brothers Racing	Ford
22	Sterling Marlin	Junior Johnson & Associates	Ford
24	Dick Trickle	Team III Racing	Pontiac
25	Ken Schrader	Hendrick Motorsports	Chevrolet
26	Brett Bodine	King Racing	Buick
28	Davey Allison	Robert Yates Racing	Ford
30	Michael Waltrip	Bahari Racing	Pontiac
33	Harry Gant	Leo Jackson Motorsports	Oldsmobile
35	Bill Venturini	Venturini Motorsports	Chevrolet
42	Bobby Hillin Jr.	SABCO Racing	Pontiac
43	Richard Petty	Petty Enterprises	Pontiac
44	Irv Hoerr	Labonte Motorsports	Oldsmobile
47	Greg Sacks	Close Racing	Oldsmobile
48	James Hylton	Hylton Motorsports	Buick
52	Jimmy Means	Jimmy Means Racing	Pontiac
53	John Paul Jr.	Team Ireland	Chevrolet
55	Ted Musgrave (R)	U.S. Racing	Pontiac
64	Gary Wright	White Racing	Chevrolet
66	Lake Speed	Cale Yarborough Motorsports	Pontiac
68	Bobby Hamilton (R)	TriStar Motorsports	Oldsmobile
70	J. D. McDuffie	McDuffie Racing	Pontiac
71	Dave Marcis	Marcis Auto Racing	Chevrolet
75	Joe Ruttman	RahMoc Enterprises	Oldsmobile
85	Bobby Gerhart	Bobby Gerhart Racing	Chevrolet
86	Walter Surma	Surma Racing	Oldsmobile
94	Terry Labonte	Hagan Racing	Oldsmobile
98	Jimmy Spencer	Travis Carter Enterprises	Chevrolet

== Qualifying ==
Qualifying was split into two rounds. The first round was held on Friday, July 19, at 3:00 PM EST. Each driver would have one lap to set a time. During the first round, the top 15 drivers in the round would be guaranteed a starting spot in the race. If a driver was not able to guarantee a spot in the first round, they had the option to scrub their time from the first round and try and run a faster lap time in a second round qualifying run, held on Saturday, July 20, at 10:30 AM EST. As with the first round, each driver would have one lap to set a time. For this specific race, positions 16-40 would be decided on time, and depending on who needed it, a select amount of positions were given to cars who had not otherwise qualified but were high enough in owner's points; up to two provisionals were given. If needed, a past champion who did not qualify on either time or provisionals could use a champion's provisional, adding one more spot to the field.

Alan Kulwicki, driving for his own AK Racing team, would win the pole, setting a time of 55.737 and an average speed of 161.473 miles per hour (259.866 km/h) in the first round.

Three drivers would fail to qualify.

=== Full qualifying results ===
Pos.	#	Driver	Team	Make	Time	Speed
1	7	Alan Kulwicki	AK Racing	Ford	55.737	161.473
2	25	Ken Schrader	Hendrick Motorsports	Chevrolet	55.801	161.287
3	6	Mark Martin	Roush Racing	Ford	56.085	160.471
4	9	Bill Elliott	Melling Racing	Ford	56.165	160.242
5	28	Davey Allison	Robert Yates Racing	Ford	56.276	159.926
6	12	Hut Stricklin	Bobby Allison Motorsports	Buick	56.303	159.849
7	5	Ricky Rudd	Hendrick Motorsports	Chevrolet	56.454	159.422
8	11	Geoff Bodine	Junior Johnson & Associates	Ford	56.501	159.289
9	17	Darrell Waltrip	Darrell Waltrip Motorsports	Chevrolet	56.534	159.196
10	2	Rusty Wallace	Penske Racing South	Pontiac	56.556	159.134
11	22	Sterling Marlin	Junior Johnson & Associates	Ford	56.591	159.036
12	21	Dale Jarrett	Wood Brothers Racing	Ford	56.693	158.750
13	4	Ernie Irvan	Morgan–McClure Motorsports	Chevrolet	56.722	158.669
14	42	Bobby Hillin Jr.	SABCO Racing	Pontiac	56.758	158.568
15	33	Harry Gant	Leo Jackson Motorsports	Oldsmobile	56.808	158.428
Failed to lock in Round 1
16	3	Dale Earnhardt	Richard Childress Racing	Chevrolet	56.828	158.373
17	43	Richard Petty	Petty Enterprises	Pontiac	56.830	158.367
18	1	Rick Mast	Precision Products Racing	Oldsmobile	56.840	158.339
19	75	Joe Ruttman	RahMoc Enterprises	Oldsmobile	56.869	158.258
20	30	Michael Waltrip	Bahari Racing	Pontiac	56.987	157.931
21	10	Derrike Cope	Whitcomb Racing	Chevrolet	57.054	157.745
22	68	Bobby Hamilton (R)	TriStar Motorsports	Oldsmobile	57.098	157.624
23	94	Terry Labonte	Hagan Racing	Oldsmobile	57.129	157.538
24	26	Brett Bodine	King Racing	Buick	57.189	157.373
25	8	Rick Wilson	Stavola Brothers Racing	Buick	57.204	157.332
26	15	Morgan Shepherd	Bud Moore Engineering	Ford	57.212	157.310
27	71	Dave Marcis	Marcis Auto Racing	Chevrolet	57.246	157.216
28	98	Jimmy Spencer	Travis Carter Enterprises	Chevrolet	57.259	157.181
29	24	Dick Trickle	Team III Racing	Pontiac	57.296	157.079
30	66	Lake Speed	Cale Yarborough Motorsports	Pontiac	57.315	157.027
31	55	Ted Musgrave (R)	U.S. Racing	Pontiac	57.629	156.171
32	44	Irv Hoerr	Labonte Motorsports	Oldsmobile	57.894	155.457
33	19	Chad Little	Little Racing	Ford	57.998	155.178
34	47	Greg Sacks	Close Racing	Oldsmobile	58.250	154.506
35	13	Gary Balough	Linro Motorsports	Buick	58.611	153.555
36	53	John Paul Jr.	Team Ireland	Chevrolet	58.711	153.293
37	64	Gary Wright	White Racing	Chevrolet	58.747	153.199
38	52	Jimmy Means	Jimmy Means Racing	Pontiac	59.347	151.650
39	35	Bill Venturini	Venturini Motorsports	Chevrolet	59.540	151.159
40	70	J. D. McDuffie	McDuffie Racing	Pontiac	1:00.424	148.947
Failed to qualify
41	48	James Hylton	Hylton Motorsports	Buick	1:01.234	146.977
42	86	Walter Surma	Surma Racing	Oldsmobile	1:03.785	141.099
43	85	Bobby Gerhart	Bobby Gerhart Racing	Chevrolet	-	-
Official first round qualifying results
Official starting lineup

== Race results ==
Fin	St	#	Driver	Team	Make	Laps	Led	Status	Pts	Winnings
1	10	2	Rusty Wallace	Penske Racing South	Pontiac	179	29	running	180	$34,100
2	3	6	Mark Martin	Roush Racing	Ford	179	23	running	175	$41,475
3	8	11	Geoff Bodine	Junior Johnson & Associates	Ford	179	1	running	170	$32,350
4	6	12	Hut Stricklin	Bobby Allison Motorsports	Buick	179	7	running	165	$21,750
5	11	22	Sterling Marlin	Junior Johnson & Associates	Ford	179	0	running	155	$14,100
6	12	21	Dale Jarrett	Wood Brothers Racing	Ford	179	3	running	155	$13,700
7	13	4	Ernie Irvan	Morgan–McClure Motorsports	Chevrolet	179	65	running	156	$16,700
8	24	26	Brett Bodine	King Racing	Buick	179	0	running	142	$11,500
9	4	9	Bill Elliott	Melling Racing	Ford	178	0	running	138	$15,000
10	19	75	Joe Ruttman	RahMoc Enterprises	Oldsmobile	178	0	running	134	$12,650
11	22	68	Bobby Hamilton (R)	TriStar Motorsports	Oldsmobile	178	0	running	130	$6,900
12	33	19	Chad Little	Little Racing	Ford	178	0	running	127	$5,900
13	31	55	Ted Musgrave (R)	U.S. Racing	Pontiac	178	0	running	124	$7,750
14	5	28	Davey Allison	Robert Yates Racing	Ford	178	1	running	126	$14,100
15	23	94	Terry Labonte	Hagan Racing	Oldsmobile	178	0	running	118	$9,550
16	1	7	Alan Kulwicki	AK Racing	Ford	177	1	running	120	$17,425
17	34	47	Greg Sacks	Close Racing	Oldsmobile	177	0	running	112	$5,100
18	27	71	Dave Marcis	Marcis Auto Racing	Chevrolet	177	1	running	114	$8,300
19	32	44	Irv Hoerr	Labonte Motorsports	Oldsmobile	177	0	running	106	$4,850
20	7	5	Ricky Rudd	Hendrick Motorsports	Chevrolet	177	0	running	103	$12,725
21	38	52	Jimmy Means	Jimmy Means Racing	Pontiac	176	1	running	105	$4,500
22	16	3	Dale Earnhardt	Richard Childress Racing	Chevrolet	175	0	running	97	$15,350
23	2	25	Ken Schrader	Hendrick Motorsports	Chevrolet	171	47	running	99	$9,650
24	25	8	Rick Wilson	Stavola Brothers Racing	Buick	165	0	running	91	$7,250
25	40	70	J. D. McDuffie	McDuffie Racing	Pontiac	152	0	running	88	$4,300
26	15	33	Harry Gant	Leo Jackson Motorsports	Oldsmobile	150	0	running	85	$7,100
27	18	1	Rick Mast	Precision Products Racing	Oldsmobile	145	0	brakes	82	$7,450
28	14	42	Bobby Hillin Jr.	SABCO Racing	Pontiac	132	0	running	79	$11,050
29	9	17	Darrell Waltrip	Darrell Waltrip Motorsports	Chevrolet	115	0	crash	76	$4,750
30	30	66	Lake Speed	Cale Yarborough Motorsports	Pontiac	99	0	valve	73	$6,650
31	17	43	Richard Petty	Petty Enterprises	Pontiac	97	0	crash	70	$6,575
32	36	53	John Paul Jr.	Team Ireland	Chevrolet	77	0	engine	67	$3,850
33	37	64	Gary Wright	White Racing	Chevrolet	63	0	transmission	64	$3,750
34	26	15	Morgan Shepherd	Bud Moore Engineering	Ford	38	0	engine	61	$10,675
35	29	24	Dick Trickle	Team III Racing	Pontiac	29	0	crash	58	$4,250
36	21	10	Derrike Cope	Whitcomb Racing	Chevrolet	20	0	crash	55	$12,925
37	28	98	Jimmy Spencer	Travis Carter Enterprises	Chevrolet	20	0	crash	52	$6,075
38	20	30	Michael Waltrip	Bahari Racing	Pontiac	14	0	crash	49	$6,010
39	39	35	Bill Venturini	Venturini Motorsports	Chevrolet	7	0	drivetrain	46	$3,375
40	35	13	Gary Balough	Linro Motorsports	Buick	2	0	crash	43	$3,300
Official race results

== Standings after the race ==
Drivers' Championship standings

	Pos	Driver	Points
	1	Dale Earnhardt	2,450
	2	Ricky Rudd	2,310 (-140)
	3	Ernie Irvan	2,295 (-155)
1	4	Davey Allison	2,250 (–200)
1	5	Ken Schrader	2,236 (–214)
2	6	Mark Martin	2,160 (–290)
1	7	Darrell Waltrip	2,136 (–314)
1	8	Harry Gant	2,085 (–365)
1	9	Sterling Marlin	1,996 (–454)
2	10	Rusty Wallace	1,971 (–479)
Official driver's standings

- Note: Only the first 10 positions are included for the driver standings.

Previous race: 1991 Pepsi 400	NASCAR Winston Cup Series; 1991 season	Next race: 1991 DieHard 500
