= 1997 24 Hours of Daytona =

Previous: 1996	Next: 1998
Index: Races | Winners

Track map of Daytona International Speedway

The 1997 Rolex 24 at Daytona was a 24-hour endurance sports car race held on February 1–2, 1997 at the Daytona International Speedway road course. The race served as the opening round of the 1997 IMSA GT Championship.

Victory overall and in the WSC class went to the No. 20 Dyson Racing Riley & Scott Mk III driven by Elliott Forbes-Robinson, John Schneider, and Rob Dyson, John Paul Jr., Butch Leitzinger, Andy Wallace, and James Weaver. Victory in the GTS-1 class went to the No. 01 Rohr Corp. Porsche 911 GT2 driven by Jochen Rohr, Andy Pilgrim, Harald Grohs, and Arnd Meier. The GTS-2 class was won by the No. 99 Roock Racing Porsche 911 GT2 driven by Ralf Kelleners, Claudia Hürtgen, Patrice Goueslard, and André Ahrlé. Victory in the GTS-3 class went to the No. 10 Prototype Technology Group, Inc. BMW M3 E36 driven by Javier Quiros, Derek Hill, Boris Said, Bill Auberlen, and Tom Hessert Jr.

== Race results ==
Class winners in bold.

Pos	Class	No	Team	Drivers	Car	Tire	Laps
1	**WSC**	**20**	(United States) **Dyson Racing**	(United States) **Elliott Forbes-Robinson** (United States) **John Schneider** (United States) **Rob Dyson** (United States) **John Paul Jr.** (United States) **Butch Leitzinger** (United Kingdom) **Andy Wallace** (United Kingdom) **James Weaver**	**Riley & Scott Mk III**	**G**	**690**
2	WSC	3	(United States) Team Scandia	(Spain) Fermín Vélez (United States) Andy Evans (United States) Charles Morgan (United States) Rob Morgan	Ferrari 333 SP	**G**	689
3	WSC	4	(Peru) Dibos Racing	(Peru) Eduardo Dibós Chappuis (United States) Jim Pace (United States) Barry Waddell	Riley & Scott Mk III	**P**	672
4	**GTS-2**	**99**	(Germany) **Roock Racing**	(Germany) **Ralf Kelleners** (Germany) **Claudia Hürtgen** (France) **Patrice Goueslard** (Germany) **André Ahrlé**	**Porsche 911 GT2**	**M**	**665**
5	**GTS-1**	**01**	(United States) **Rohr Corp.**	(United States) **Jochen Rohr** (United States) **Andy Pilgrim** (Germany) **Harald Grohs** (Germany) **Arnd Meier**	**Porsche 911 GT2**	**P**	**663**
6	GTS-1	74	(United States) Champion Porsche	(Germany) Hans-Joachim Stuck (Canada) Bill Adam (Belgium) Thierry Boutsen	Porsche 911 GT2	**P**	661
7	WSC	30	(Italy) Moretti Racing	(Italy) Giampiero Moretti (Brazil) Antônio Hermann (United Kingdom) Derek Bell (Belgium) Didier Theys	Ferrari 333 SP	**Y**	660
8	GTS-2	03	(Germany) Roock Racing	(Belgium) Philippe de Craene (United States) Zak Brown (United States) Dirk Layer (France) Michel Ligonnet	Porsche 911 GT2	**P**	651
9	**GTS-3**	**10**	(United States) **Prototype Technology Group, Inc.**	(Costa Rica) **Javier Quiros** (United States) **Derek Hill** (United States) **Boris Said** (United States) **Bill Auberlen** (United States) **Tom Hessert Jr.**	**BMW M3 E36**	**Y**	**640**
10	GTS-3	39	(United States) Jim Mathews Racing	(United States) Jim Mathews (United States) Hurley Haywood (United States) David Murry (United States) Doc Bundy	Porsche 993	**P**	638
11	GTS-3	76	(United States) Team A.R.E.	(United States) Kelly Collins (United States) Mike Doolin (United States) Scott Peeler (United States) Cort Wagner	Porsche 993 Carrera RSR	**Y**	638
12	GTS-2	31	(Germany) Konrad Motorsport	(France) Bob Wollek (France) Yannick Dalmas (Germany) Wido Rössler (Austria) Franz Konrad	Porsche 911 GT2	**M**	637
13	GTS-3	69	(Costa Rica) Jorge Trejos	(United States) Tim Ralston (United States) Jeff Gamroth (Costa Rica) Jorge Trejos (United States) Monte Shelton	Porsche 993	?	632
14	GTS-3	26	(United States) Team Seattle/Alex Job Racing	(United States) Anthony Lazzaro (United States) Eric Bretzel (United States) Mike Conte (Italy) Angelo Cilli	Porsche 993	**Y**	631
15	GTS-1	94	(France) Viper Team Oreca	(Monaco) Olivier Beretta (United States) Tommy Archer (France) Dominique Dupuy	Chrysler Viper GTS-R	**M**	628
16	GTS-2	98	(United States) Schumacher Racing	(United States) Larry Schumacher (United States) John O'Steen (United States) Will Pace (United Kingdom) Robert Nearn	Porsche 911 Carrera RSR	**P**	627
17	GTS-3	25	(United States) Team Seattle/Alex Job Racing	(United States) Jeff Purner (United States) Terry Lingner (United States) Robbie Groff (United States) Charles Slater	Porsche 964 Carrera RSR	**P**	624
18	GTS-3	6	(United States) Prototype Technology Group, Inc.	(United States) John Fergus (United States) Ron Finger (United States) Dan Marvin (United States) Boris Said (United States) Derek Hill	BMW M3 E36	**Y**	622
19	GTS-1	46	(United Kingdom) Lister Storm Racing	(United Kingdom) Geoff Lees (United Kingdom) Tiff Needell (United Kingdom) Anthony Reid	Lister Storm GTL	**M**	615
20	GTS-3	53	(Switzerland) Rohr Corp.	(Germany) Axel Rohr (Switzerland) Bruno Michelotti (Switzerland) Denis Lay (Switzerland) Uwe Sick	Porsche 964 Carrera RSR	**P**	615
21	GTS-3	04	(United States) Max Schmidt	(United States) Mike Johnson (United States) Duke Johnson (United States) Max Schmidt (United States) Rusty Schmidt	Porsche 911 Carrera RSR	**P**	609
22	GTS-3	55	(Switzerland) Stadler Motorsport	(Switzerland) Lilian Bryner (Switzerland) Enzo Calderari (Germany) Ellen Lohr (Germany) Ulli Richter	Porsche 964	**P**	607
23	GTS-3	40	(Belgium) Paul Kumpen	(Belgium) Kurt Thiers (Belgium) Dirk Schoysman (Belgium) Jean-François Hemroulle (Belgium) Stéphane Cohen	Porsche 911	?	602
24	GTS-3	54	(Canada) Doug Trott	(Canada) Richard Spenard (United States) John Ruther (United States) Spencer Lane (Canada) Doug Trott (United States) Tom Baldwin (United States) Grady Willingham	Porsche 993	?	600
25	GTS-2	56	(United States) Martin Snow	(United States) Martin Snow (United States) Peter Kitchak (United States) Ray Lintott (United States) Terry Olilla	Porsche 911 GT2	**P**	591
26	WSC	63	(United States) Downing/Atlanta Racing	(United States) Tim McAdam (Japan) Yojiro Terada (Italy) Joe Castellano (United States) Jim Downing	Kudzu DLM	**G**	569
27	GTS-3	96	(Germany) Proton Competition	(Germany) Helmut Reis (Austria) Karl Augustin (Austria) Manfred Jurasz (Germany) Gerold Ried (Hungary) Kalman Bodis	Porsche 911 GT2	?	565
28	GTS-1	97	(Germany) Klaus Scheer	(Germany) Edgar Dören (Belgium) Léo Van Sande (Germany) Klaus Scheer (Germany) Berndt Neutag	Porsche 911 GT2	**G**	560
29	GTS-3	78	(United States) Team A.R.E.	(United States) Steve Velasquez (United States) Gary Blackman (United States) Steve Dente (United States) Richard Gray	Porsche 964 Carrera RSR	**Y**	554
30	GTS-1	35	(United States) Bill McDill	(United States) Richard McDill (United States) Tom Juckette (Italy) Gianni Biava (United States) Bill McDill	Chevrolet Camaro	**Y**	540
31	GTS-1	09	(United States) Rice Racing	(United States) Ray Kong (United States) Tommy Miller (United States) Vic Rice (United States) Chris Neville	Pontiac Grand Prix	?	534
32	GTS-1	37	(United States) Hoyt Overbagh	(Italy) Mauro Casadei (Italy) Stefano Bucci (Italy) Francesco Ciani (Italy) Andrea Garbagnati	Chevrolet Camaro	**G**	507
33	WSC	81	(United Kingdom) Graham Williams	(United Kingdom) Kevin Sherwood (United Kingdom) Mike Millard (United Kingdom) Peter Hardman (United Kingdom) Nigel Greensall	ProSport 3000 Spyder	**D**	498
34 DNF	WSC	8	(United States) Support Net Racing	(United States) Henry Camferdam (United States) Johnny O'Connell (United States) Scott Schubot (United States) Roger Mandeville	Hawk C-8	**Y**	494
35	GTS-1	90	(United States) Road Circuit Technology	(United States) Andy Petery (United States) Les Delano (Republic of Ireland) Tim O'Kennedy (United States) Craig Carter	Oldsmobile Cutlass Supreme	?	490
36 DNF	GTS-1	91	(United States) Rock Valley Oil & Chemical Co.	(United States) Roger Schramm (United States) Stu Hayner (United States) John Heinricy (United States) Marty Miller	Chevrolet Camaro	**G**	468
37 DNF	GTS-3	77	(United States) Mattco Racing	(United States) Matthew Cohen (United States) Pete Halsmer (United States) John Morton (Canada) Sylvain Tremblay	BMW M3 E36	**Y**	440
38 DNF	WSC	1	(United States) Doyle Racing/Riley & Scott	(South Africa) Wayne Taylor (United States) Scott Sharp (Belgium) Eric van de Poele	Riley & Scott Mk III	**P**	427
39 DNF	GTS-3	42	(United States) Jarett Freeman	(United States) Jarett Freeman (United States) Simon Gregg (United States) Michael Duffy	Porsche 993	**Y**	422
40	GTS-1	87	(United States) John Annis	(United States) John Annis (United States) Kelly Toombs (United States) Neil Tilbor (United States) Chris Funk (United States) Keith Scharf (United States) David Donovan	Chevrolet Camaro	?	404
41 DNF	GTS-2	85	(United Kingdom) Chamberlain Engineering	(United States) Chris Gleason (United Kingdom) Grant Thomas (United Kingdom) Jack Gratton (United Kingdom) Gerard MacQuillan	Porsche 911 GT2	**G**	400
42	GTS-3	24	(United States) Team Seattle/Alex Job Racing	(United States) Don Kitch Jr. (United States) Chris Bingham (United States) Chip Hanauer (United States) Chuck Lyford (United States) Byron Sanborn	Porsche 911	**G**	400
43	GTS-3	68	(United States) The Racer's Group	(United States) Kevin Buckler (United States) Charlie Nearburg (United States) Steve Rees (United States) Fred Seipp	Porsche 993	?	393
44 DNF	WSC	29	(Italy) Target 24	(Italy) Alex Caffi (Italy) Ivan Capelli (Italy) Fabio Montani (Italy) Gabrio Rosa	Riley & Scott Mk III	**P**	390
45 DNF	GTS-3	83	(Italy) GT Racing Team	(Italy) Gianfranco Brancatelli (Italy) Luca Drudi (Italy) Luigino Pagotto (Italy) Renato Mastropietro (Switzerland) Charles Margueron	Porsche 911	**P**	387
46	GTS-2	47	(United States) TF Racing	(United States) Nick Longhi (United States) John Kohler (United States) Matt Turner (United States) Joseph Safina (United States) Gary R. Smith (Canada) Jeff Lapcevich	Saleen Mustang	?	377
47 DNF	GTS-3	05	(United States) Auto Sport South	(United States) Jeff Hays (United States) Cary Eisenlohr (United States) Steve Rebeil (United States) William Stitt (United States) Kevin Wheeler	Porsche 993	**Y**	374
48 DNF	GTS-3	7	(United States) Prototype Technology Group, Inc.	(Austria) Dieter Quester (Belgium) Marc Duez (Germany) Markus Oestreich (United States) Boris Said	BMW M3 E36	**Y**	373
49 DNF	GTS-1	75	(United States) Robinson Racing	(United States) George Robinson (United States) Irv Hoerr (United States) Jack Baldwin (Canada) Victor Sifton	Oldsmobile Aurora	**G**	368
50	GTS-1	27	(United States) Hoyt Overbagh	(Italy) Marco Polani (Italy) Silvino Giarotti (Italy) Fabio Rosa (United States) C. J. Johnson (Italy) Marco de Iturbe	Chevrolet Camaro	**G**	353
51	GTS-3	58	(United States) Protechnik Racing	(United States) Philip Collin (United States) Lew Brouchier (Italy) Mauro Barella (Italy) Luca Cattaneo (United States) Sam Shalala (United States) Alex Tradd	Porsche 993	?	353
52	WSC	60	(United States) Kopf Precision Race Products Team	(United States) Owen Trinkler (Mexico) Roberto Quintanilla (United States) Jeff Ward	Keiler KII	**G**	348
53 DNF	GTS-1	64	(United States) Mel A. Butt	(United States) Mel Butt (United States) Jim Higgs (United States) Dave McTureous (United States) Dennis King	Chevrolet Camaro	**G**	339
54 DNF	GTS-1	71	(United States) Johnny Unser	(United States) Boris Said (United States) Johnny Unser (Italy) Enrico Bertaggia (Canada) Ron Fellows	Callaway C7-R	**G**	331
55	GTS-3	44	(United States Virgin Islands) Brad Creber	(United States) Lance Stewart (United States Virgin Islands) Brad Creber (United States) John Bourassa (United States) John Finger	Mazda RX-7	**Y**	310
56 DNF	GTS-2	70	(Belgium) AD Sport	(Belgium) Kurt Dujardyn (Belgium) Kris Wauters (Belgium) Koen Wauters (Belgium) Jean-Paul Herreman	Porsche 911 GT2	**P**	304
57	WSC	19	(United States) Davin Racing	(United States) Mark Montgomery (United States) Edd Davin (United States) Butch Brickell	Argo P	**G**	279
58	GTS-2	67	(United States) Saleen Allen Speedlab	(United States) Price Cobb (United Kingdom) Phil Andrews (United States) Rob Rizzo (United Kingdom) David Warnock (United Kingdom) Robert Schirle (United States) Tim Allen	Saleen Mustang	?	274
59 DNF	GTS-3	92	(United States) RAE Motorsports	(United States) Raymond Boissoneau (United States) Peter Gobel (United States) J. W. Pettigrew (United States) David Loring (United States) Peter Argetsinger	Mazda RX-7	?	271
60 DNF	WSC	16	(United States) Dyson Racing	(United Kingdom) Andy Wallace (United States) John Paul Jr. (United States) Butch Leitzinger (United Kingdom) James Weaver	Riley & Scott Mk III	**G**	227
61 DNF	GTS-1	80	(United States) David Perelle	(United States) Richard Maugeri (United States) Sim Penton (United States) Rob Debartelobeu (United States) Dave Perelle	Oldsmobile Cutlass Supreme	**G**	219
62 DNF	GTS-3	73	(United States) Jack Lewis Enterprises Ltd.	(Ecuador) Henry Taleb (Puerto Rico) Edison Lluch (United States) Kurt Mathewson (United States) Scott Knollenberg	Porsche 993 Carrera RSR	?	209
63	WSC	28	(United States) FAB Factory Motorsport	(United States) Jon Field (United States) A. J. Smith (United States) Ralph Thomas (United States) John Mirro (United States) Rick Ferguson	Spice SE95	**G**	182
64	GTS-1	62	(United States) Diablo Racing	(United States) Tom Scheuren (United States) Kerry Hitt (United States) Bobby Jones (United States) Gerry Green	Chevrolet Camaro	?	181
65 DNF	WSC	2	(United States) Screaming Eagles Racing	(United States) Craig T. Nelson (United States) Case Montgomery (United States) Dan Clark (United States) Darin Brassfield	Riley & Scott Mk III	**Y**	158
66 DNF	GTS-3	41	(United States) Team Technodyne	(United States) Chris Cervelli (United States) Bruce Busby (United States) Mark Anderson	Porsche 993 Carrera RSR	**P**	138
67 DNF	WSC	95	(United States) TRV Motorsports	(United States) Tom Volk (United States) Don Bell (United States) Bill Cooper (France) Franck Fréon	Kudzu DL-4	?	121
68	GTS-2	65	(United States) Saleen Allen Speedlab	(United Kingdom) Robert Schirle (United States) Steve Saleen (United Kingdom) David Warnock (United States) Tim Allen	Saleen Mustang	?	109
69 DNF	GTS-1	51	(United States) Fantasy Junction	(United States) Bruce Trenery (United Kingdom) Grahame Bryant (United Kingdom) Jeffrey Pattinson (Belgium) Patrick van Schoote	Chevrolet Monte Carlo	?	101
70 DNF	GTS-1	45	(United States) Davies Motorsports	(Canada) Scott Goodyear (United States) Ed Davies (Netherlands) Arie Luyendyk	Porsche 964 Turbo	**G**	95
71 DNF	GTS-3	38	(United States) Mark Hein	(United States) Dorsey Schroeder (United States) Peter Cunningham (United States) John Green (United States) Mark Hein (United States) Greg Loebel	Acura NSX	**Y**	90
72 DNF	WSC	88	(United States) MSI Racing	(Canada) Ross Bentley (United States) Danny Sullivan (United States) Jeff Jones (United States) Robbie Buhl	Riley & Scott Mk III	**G**	72
73 DNF	GTS-3	22	(United States) Paul Reisman	(United States) Paul Reisman (United States) John Reisman (United States) Shane Lewis (United States) Buddy Norton	Chevrolet Camaro	?	57
74 DNF	GTS-1	15	(United States) Anthony Puleo	(Germany) Ernst Gschwender (United States) Anthony Puleo (United States) Mark Kennedy (United States) Daniel Urrutia	Chevrolet Camaro	?	46
75 DNF	GTS-3	50	(Belgium) Paul Kumpen	(Belgium) Alfons Taels (Belgium) Georges Cremer (Belgium) Paul Kumpen (Belgium) Albert Vanierschot	Porsche 911	?	39
76 DNF	GTS-2	61	(Germany) Konrad Motorsport	(Netherlands) Cor Euser (Germany) Bernd Netzeband (Netherlands) Bert Ploeg (Germany) Wolfgang Kaufmann	Porsche 911 GT2	**M**	23
77 DNF	GTS-2	00	(United Kingdom) Agusta Racing	(Italy) Almo Coppelli (Italy) Rocky Agusta (Sweden) Carl Rosenblad	Chevrolet Corvette	**D**	23
78 DNF	GTS-1	34	(United States) Todd Vallancourt	(United States) Todd Vallancourt (United States) Hal Corbin (United States) Bill Evans (El Salvador) Toto Lasally	Oldsmobile Cutlass Supreme	**H**	22
79 DNF	GTS-1	49	(United States) Dan Shaver	(United States) Dan Shaver (United States) Jack Willes (United States) Joe Varde	Chevrolet Camaro	?	16
80 DNF	WSC	9	(France) Courage Compétition	(Sweden) Fredrik Ekblom (France) Didier Cottaz (France) Jérôme Policand	Courage C41	**M**	12
DNS	WSC	02	(United States) Screaming Eagles Racing	(United States) Dan Clark	Spice SE90	?	-
DNS	GTS-3	84	(Italy) Luigino Pagotto	(Italy) Walter Meloni (Belgium) Léo Van Sande	Porsche 911	?	-
DNQ	GTS-1	17	(United States) Art Pilla	(United States) Arthur Pilla (United States) Oma Kimbrough (United States) David Kicak	Porsche 911 GT2	**G**	-
DNQ	GTS-3	86	(United States) G&W Motorsports	(United States) Danny Marshall (United States) Arthur Urciuoli (United Kingdom) Peter Chambers (United Kingdom) Martyn Konig	Porsche 993 Cup	**D**	-
DNQ	GTS-3	5	(Canada) Doug Trott	(United States) Tom Dean (United States) Tom Baldwin (Canada) Tony Burgess (United States) Grady Willingham	Porsche 911	**T**	-
DNQ	GTS-3	07	(United States) Pettit Racing	(United States) Cameron Worth (Venezuela) Enzo Potolicchio (United States) John Brown (United States) Rodger Bogusz	Mazda RX-7 Turbo	**H**	-
DNQ	GTS-3	32	(United States) Steve Goldin	(United States) Steve Goldin (United States) Keith Goldin (United States) Mark Montgomery (United States) Martin Shuster	Mazda RX-7	**H**	-
DNQ	GTS-3	12	(United States) Rick Fairbanks	(United States) Rick Fairbanks (United States) Nick Ham (United States) Chuck Cottrell (United States) Mark Neuhaus (United States) Chris Gleason	Porsche 911	?	-
DNQ	GTS-3	82		(United States) Rob Collins (United States) Trevor Hilliar (United States) Dan Moon (United States) John Drew (Germany) Neil Crilly	Porsche 911	**D**	-
DNQ	GTS-3	52	(United States) Kryderacing	(United States) Reed Kryder (United States) Frank Del Vecchio (France) Christian Heinkélé (United States) David Green	Nissan 240SX	?	-
DNQ	GTS-3	36	(United States) Phoenix American Motorsports	(United States) Stu Hayner (United States) John Heinricy (United States) Marty Miller (United States) Jim Michaelian	Pontiac Firebird	?	-
DNQ	GTS-3	57	(United States) Kryderacing	(United States) Reed Kryder (Germany) Willie Beck (Germany) Helmut Reuscher (Germany) Gred Holtkamp (United Kingdom) Alistair Morrison	Nissan 240SX	?	-
DNQ	GTS-1	79	(United States) Tim Banks	(United States) Tim Banks	Oldsmobile Cutlass Supreme	?	-
DNQ	GTS-3	66	(United States) G&W Motorsports	(United States) Danny Marshall (United States) Steve Marshall	Porsche 964	**G**	-
DNQ	GTS-1	72	(United States) Tim Banks	(United States) Tim Banks	Chevrolet Corvette	**D**	-
DNQ	WSC	33	(United States) FAB Factory Motorsport	(United States) John Mirro (Germany) Oliver Kuttner (United States) Ralph Thomas (United States) A. J. Smith (United States) Rick Ferguson	Kudzu DG-2 WSC	?	-
