= 1996 12 Hours of Sebring =

Sports car endurance race

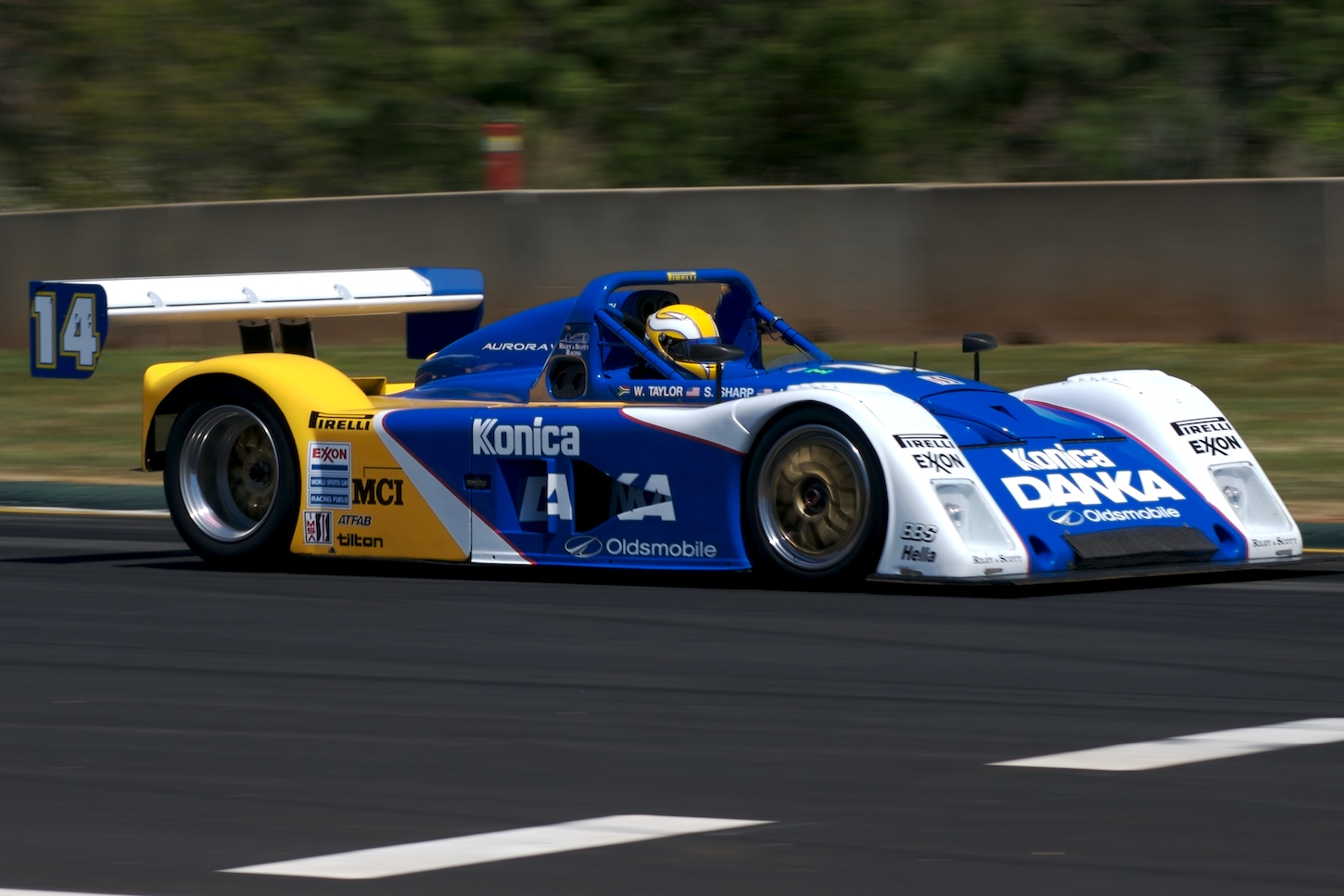
Riley & Scott Mk III

The 44th Superflo 12 Hours of Sebring presented by Aurora was an endurance racing sports car event held at Sebring International Raceway from March 13–16, 1996. The race served as the second round of the 1996 IMSA GT Championship.

== Race results ==
Class winners in bold.

Pos	Class	No	Team	Drivers	Car	Tyre	Laps
1	**WSC**	**4**	**(United States) Doyle Racing**	**(South Africa) Wayne Taylor (Belgium) Eric van de Poele (United States) Jim Pace**	**Riley & Scott Mk III**	**P**	**334**
2	WSC	3	(United States) Scandia Engineering	(United States) Andy Evans (Italy) Mauro Baldi (Italy) Michele Alboreto	Ferrari 333 SP	**P**	330
3	WSC	30	(Italy) Momo Corse	(Italy) Gianpiero Moretti (Italy) Max Papis (Belgium) Didier Theys	Ferrari 333 SP	**Y**	325
4	WSC	63	(United States) Downing/Atlanta	(United States) Butch Hamlet (United States) Barry Waddell (United States) Jim Downing	Kudzu DLM	**G**	318
5	WSC	20	(United States) Dyson Racing	(United Kingdom) Andy Wallace (United States) Butch Leitzinger	Riley & Scott Mk III	**G**	314
6	**GTS-1**	**74**	**(United States) Champion Porsche**	**(Germany) Hans-Joachim Stuck (Canada) Bill Adam**	**Porsche 911 GT2**	**G**	**309**
7	GTS-1	1	(United States) Brix Racing	(United States) Darin Brassfield (United States) Brian Cunningham (United States) Irv Hoerr	Oldsmobile Aurora	**G**	305
8	GTS-1	56	(United States) Martin Snow	(United States) Martin Snow (United States) Dennis Aase (Costa Rica) Jorge Trejos	Porsche 911 GT2	**P**	302
9	GTS-1	72	(United States) Champion Porsche	(United States) John Fergus (United Kingdom) Derek Bell	Porsche 911 Turbo	**G**	302
10	GTS-1	48	(United States) Chapman Root	(United States) David Murry (United States) Chapman Root (United States) Charles Nearburg	Porsche 911 Turbo	?	301
11	**GTS-2**	**99**	**(United States) Schumacher Racing**	**(United States) Will Pace (United Kingdom) Andy Pilgrim (United States) Larry Schumacher**	**Porsche 911 Carrera RSR**	**P**	**294**
12	GTS-1	97	(United States) Canaska Southwind Motorsports	(United States) Joe Varde (United States) George Robinson (United States) Price Cobb (Canada) Victor Sifton	Dodge Viper GTS-R	**MI**	294
13	WSC	0	(United States) Auto Toy Store	(United Kingdom) Justin Bell (Germany) Gustl Spreng (United States) Morris Shirazi	Spice SE90	?	292
14	GTS-2	93	Ecuador Mobil 1 Racing	(Ecuador) Henry Taleb (Ecuador) Jean-Pierre Michelet (New Zealand) Rob Wilson	Nissan 240SX	?	291
15	GTS-2	07	(United States) Prototype Technology Group	(United States) Pete Halsmer (Austria) Dieter Quester (Germany) Manfred Wollgarten (United States) David Donohue (Costa Rica) Javier Quiros	BMW M3	**Y**	288
16	GTS-2	78	(United States) Team A.R.E.	(United States) Cort Wagner (United States) Mike Doolin (United States) Kelly Collins (United States) Brent Martini	Porsche 964 Carrera RSR	**Y**	288
17	GTS-1	5	(United States) Brix Racing	(United States) Joe Pezza (United States) Charles Morgan (United States) Rob Morgan	Oldsmobile Aurora	**G**	287
18	GTS-1	69	(Germany) Spreng Racing	(United States) Ray Mummery (Austria) Fritz Wegener (Germany) Kersten Jodexnis	Porsche 993 Carrera Turbo	?	278
19	GTS-1	17	(United States) Art Pilla	(United States) Art Pilla (United States) Oma Kimbrough (United States) Mike Bavaro	Porsche 911 GT2 Evo	**G**	273
20	GTS-2	57	(United States) Kryderacing	(United States) Reed Kryder (United States) Frank Del Vecchio	Nissan 240SX	?	271
21	GTS-2	73	(United States) Jack Lewis Enterprises	(United States) Jack Lewis (United States) Peter Uria (Puerto Rico) Edison Lluch	Porsche 993 Carrera RSR	**G**	271
22	GTS-2	86	(United States) G&W Motorsports, Inc.	(United States) Steve Marshall (United States) Danny Marshall (United States) John Biggs (United States) Weldon Scrogham	Porsche 964 Carrera Cup	?	265
23	GTS-2	46	(United States) Rob Collings	(United States) John Drew (United States) James Nelson (United States) Rob Collings (United States) Bruce Harrison	Porsche 911 Carrera RS Cup	?	262
24	WSC	16	(United States) Dyson Racing	(United States) John Paul Jr. (United States) Rob Dyson (United Kingdom) James Weaver	Riley & Scott Mk III	**G**	262
25	WSC	7	(United States) Bobby Brown Motorsports	(United States) Elliot Forbes-Robinson (United States) John Schneider (United States) Don Bell	Spice HC94	**P**	261
26 DNF	GTS-2	27	(United States) Jack Refenning	(United States) Jack Refenning (United States) Tim Vargo (United States) Brady Refenning	Porsche 993 Carrera Cup	**P**	247
27 DNF	GTS-1	91	(United States) Rock Valley Oil & Chemical Co.	(United States) Stu Hayner (United States) John Heinricy (United States) Roger Schramm	Chevrolet Camaro	**G**	246
28 DNF	GTS-2	25	(United States) Angleo Cilli	(United States) Anthony Lazzaro (Italy) Angelo Cilli (United States) Mike Fitzgerald	Porsche 911	**G**	246
29	GTS-2	24	(United States) Alex Job Racing	(United States) Charles Slater (United States) Ron Finger (United States) John Rutherford (United States) Bill Auberlen (United States) Bruce McQuiston	Porsche 911	**G**	240
30 DNF	WSC	9	(United States) Scott Schubot	(United States) Scott Schubot (France) Jérôme Policand	Courage C41	**MI**	239
31	GTS-2	52	(United States) Andy Strasser	(United States) Andy Strasser (United States) Kevin Wheeler (United States) Alan Ludwig (United States) John Bourassa	Porsche 911 Carrera RSR	?	237
32	GTS-1	6	(Peru) Juan Dibos	(Peru) Eduardo Dibos (Dominican Republic) Luis Mendez (United States) Bill Auberlen	Ford Mustang	**Y**	236
33 DNF	WSC	51	(United States) Fantasy Junction	(United States) Bruce Trenery (United Kingdom) Nigel Smith (United States) Kent Painter	Cannibal-Chevrolet	?	233
34	GTS-1	92	(United States) Hoyt Overbagh	(Italy) Mauro Casadei (Italy) Gianni Biava (United States) Mark Montgomery (United States) Hoyt Overbagh (United States) Robert McElheny	Chevrolet Camaro	?	230
35	GTS-1	98	(United States) Canaska Southwind Motorsports	(Canada) Trevor Seibert (United States) Mark Dismore (United States) Price Cobb	Dodge Viper GTS-R	**MI**	205
36	GTS-2	42	(United States) Simon Gregg	(United States) Simon Gregg (United States) Max Schmidt (United States) Jarett Freeman	Porsche 993 Carrera Cup	**P**	201
37 DNF	GTS-1	09	(Germany) Konrad Motorsport	(United States) Charles Mendez (Austria) Franz Konrad (Brazil) Antônio Hermann (Czech Republic) Karel Dolejší (Germany) André Ahrlé	Porsche 911 GT2 Evo	**MI**	192
38	GTS-2	58	(United States) Pro Technik Racing	(United States) Sam Shalala (United States) Jim Matthews (United States) Mark Hillestad (United States) Matt Turner (United States) Walt Bohren	Porsche 993	**G**	189
39	GTS-1	53	(United States) Team Rehabworks	(United States) David Rubins (United States) Leonard McQue (United States) Ted Kempgens (United States) Gary Davis	Chevrolet Camaro	?	188
40 DNF	GTS-2	89	(United States) Philip Collin	(United States) Philip Collin (United States) Kevin Buckler (United States) Joe Cogbill	Porsche 911	**G**	186
41 DNF	GTS-1	35	(United States) Bill McDill	(United States) Richard McDill (United States) Bill McDill (United States) Tom Juckette	Chevrolet Camaro	**Y**	173
42 DNF	GTS-2	54	(Canada) Doug Trott	(Canada) Doug Trott (Canada) Rick Bye (United States) John Ruther (United States) Philip Kubik	Porsche 993 Cup RSR	**Y**	171
43	GTS-1	87	(United States) Simon Gregg	(United States) John Annis (United States) Bob Boudinot (United States) David Donovan	Chevrolet Camaro	**G**	171
44 DNF	WSC	2	(United States) Screaming Eagles Racing	(United States) Craig T. Nelson (United States) Johnny O'Connell (United States) Dan Clark	Riley & Scott Mk III	**Y**	147
45 DNF	GTS-2	06	(United States) Prototype Technology Group	(United States) David Donohue (Costa Rica) Javier Quiros	BMW M3	**Y**	114
46 DNF	GTS-2	88	(United States) Douglas Campbell	(United States) Ralph Thomas (United States) Douglas Campbell (United States) John Bourassa	Mazda RX-7	?	109
47 DNF	GTS-2	55	(Switzerland) Stadler Motorsport	(Switzerland) Enzo Calderari (Switzerland) Lilian Bryner (Germany) Ulli Richter	Porsche 911 Carrera RSR	**P**	99
48 DNF	WSC	43	(United States) Lee Payne Racing	(Canada) Ross Bentley (United States) Lee Payne (France) Franck Fréon	Riley & Scott Mk III	**G**	97
49 DNF	GTS-1	34	(United States) Gary Smith	(United States) Gary Smith (United States) David Rankin (United States) Luis Sereix	Chevrolet Camaro	?	81
50 DNF	GTS-2	22	(United States) Eurosport Racing	(United States) Bohdan Kroczek (United States) Gerry Petroskey	Porsche 911 GT2	?	78
51 DNF	GTS-2	26	(United States) Alex Job Racing	(United States) Tom Hessert (United States) Hurley Haywood (United States) Charles Slater	Porsche 911 ME	**G**	73
52 DNF	WSC	8	(United States) Support Net Racing	(United States) Bill Auberlen (United States) Henry Camferdam (United States) Roger Mandeville	Hawk C-8	**G**	64
53 DNF	WSC	36	(United States) Wheel Works Racing	(Belgium) Jean-Paul Libert (United States) Steve Fossett (United States) Rick Sutherland (United States) Dean Hall	Courage C41	**G**	56
54 DNF	GTS-2	67	(United States) Hendricks Porsche	(United States) Jeff Purner (United States) Dave White (United States) Charles Coker (United States) Karl Singer	Porsche 964 Carrera RSR	**P**	54
55 DNF	GTS-2	81	(Canada) Rudi Bartling	(Canada) Vito Scavone (Canada) Derek Oland (Canada) Rudi Bartling (Canada) Jeffery Pabst	Porsche 968	?	50
56 DNF	GTS-2	18	(United States Virgin Islands) Brad Cregar	(United States) Lance Stewart (United States Virgin Islands) Brad Cregar (Germany) Hatmut Haussecker	Mazda RX-7	?	35
57 DNF	WSC	19	(Italy) Team SCI	(Italy) Ranieri Randaccio (United States) Sam Brown (United Kingdom) Robin Smith	Spice SE90C	**P**	31
58 DNF	GTS-1	44	(United States) Jacobs Motorsport	(United States) Michael Jacobs (United States) Bill Weller	Pontiac Firebird	?	31
