= John Paul Jr. (racing driver) =

American racing driver (1960–2020)

- Born: John Lee Paul Jr. February 19, 1960 Muncie, Indiana, U.S.
- Died: December 29, 2020 (aged 60) Los Angeles, California, U.S.

Championship titles
- Major victories 24 Hours of Daytona (1982, 1997); 12 Hours of Sebring (1982); Michigan 500 (1983)

Champ Car career
- 29 races run over 11 years
- Best finish: 8th (1983)
- First race: 1982 Road America 200 (Elkhart Lake)
- Last race: 1994 Indianapolis 500 (Indianapolis)
- First win: 1983 Michigan 500 (Michigan)
Wins	Podiums	Poles
1	5	1

IndyCar Series career
- 24 races run over 3 years
- Best finish: 11th (1998)
- First race: 1996 Indy 200 at Walt Disney World (Orlando)
- Last race: 1999 Mall.com 500 (Texas)
- First win: 1998 Lone Star 500 (Texas)
Wins	Podiums	Poles
1	1	0

NASCAR Cup Series career
- 2 races run over 1 year
- Best finish: 56th (1991)
- First race: 1991 Miller Genuine Draft 500 (Pocono)
- Last race: 1991 Budweiser at The Glen (Watkins Glen)
Wins	Top tens	Poles
0	0	0

John Lee Paul Jr. (February 19, 1960 – December 29, 2020) was an American racing driver. He competed in CART and the Indy Racing League competitions, but primarily in IMSA GT Championship, winning the title in 1982.

During his career, Paul was a twice winner of the 24 Hours of Daytona, the first of these was while co-driving with his father, John Paul Sr. A few weeks later, the pair won the 1982 12 Hours of Sebring. Paul also triumphed in another major U.S. race, the 1983 Michigan 500.

Beside racing with his father, Paul also joined his father in criminal activities, in particular a drug smuggling operation. In May 1986, Paul Jr. received a five-year sentence for racketeering, with the drug charges dropped. Paul Sr. was found guilty, served time for a number of crimes, and disappeared in 2001.

== Career ==
=== Beginnings ===
After graduating from high school, Paul Jr. started working for his father's team, JLP Racing, learning the ins and outs of what a racing organization was. He became some kind of jack-of-all-trades within the team. As Paul Jr. started to learn about engines, his father decided his son needed to go to a racing school. He was enrolled at the Skip Barber Racing School, but Paul Jr. was deemed to be hopeless. Despite this setback, Paul Sr. bought his son a new Van Diemen Formula Ford. In 1979, he took part in SCCA National Formula Ford races, and made the SCCA National Championship Runoffs.

=== 1980s ===
Pauls career really launched in 1980, when he became part of JLP Racing's driver line-up. His first race was at Coca-Cola 400 at Lime Rock. Co-driving alongside his father in a Porsche 935, they won the second heat, and subsequently the race overall. Junior had won the first IMSA race he entered. He repeated this feat by winning the Road America Pabst 500 three months later. With three second places, he would finish fourth in the final IMSA GTP standings.

During the 1981 season, the Porsche team faced a new challenge from the Lola T600. The Chevrolet-powered prototype with its better handling, driven by Englishman Brian Redman, quickly dominated the IMSA Championship. During the season, it became clear that only Junior could challenge for race victories, so Senior became JLP Racing's team manager, while Junior did the driving. Senior then only co-drove in the endurance races. Despite having the Lola, the Pauls won a rain-shortened race at Pocono in their Porsche 935 JLP-3. Using the same 935, Junior would go on to win the Daytona finale.

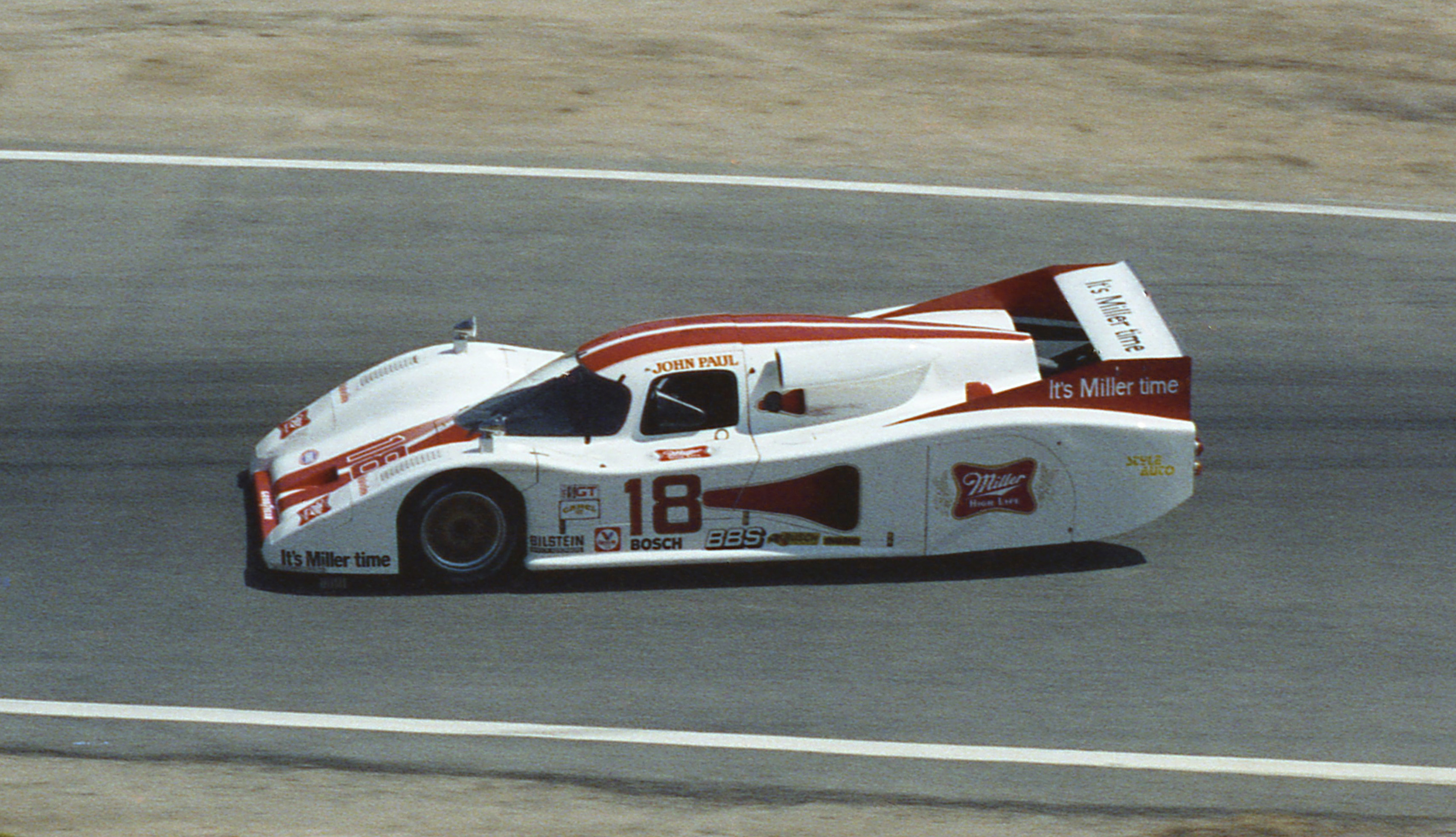
John Paul Jr. became the youngest-ever IMSA champion in 1982.

The Pauls started the 1982 season with back-to-back wins in the US classic endurance races, the 24 Hours of Daytona and the 12 Hours of Sebring. For the Daytona race, they were partnered by the 1977 Deutsche Rennsport Meisterschaft Champion, Rolf Stommelen. At Sebring, they overcame a gearbox failure in their 935 to win over the March 82G, led by the hard charging Bobby Rahal. The Pauls' second team car was also on the podium. More importantly, Paul's win at Road Atlanta attracted Miller Brewing Company sponsorship for the remainder of the season. He then switched to the Lola to win at Laguna Seca. He teamed up again with his father in the 935 JLP-3 to win the Charlotte 500 km.

Outpowered by championship rival, John Fitzpatrick in Porsche 935K4, Paul drove a new Porsche 935 JLP-4 to a debut victory at Brainerd. He scored another win at Portland, before swapping back to the older Porsche for the endurance races. He drove the JLP-3 with his father to win the Mosport 6 Hours. For the next endurance race, Paul was partnered with Mauricio de Narváez, and the pair finished second in Road America, behind the English pairing of Fitzpatrick and David Hobbs. He was re-united with his father at Road Atlanta for the 500 km event. Their last race together resulted in a second place in Pocono. Paul Jr. had clinched the IMSA GT Championship at the age of 22, becoming IMSA's youngest ever GTP champion.

At the beginning of 1983 Paul Sr. shot federal witness Stephen Caron, who would testify about Paul's illegal activities. After finishing second in the Grand Prix of Miami in a JLP Racing Lola, the team would be dismantled following his father's disappearance. Paul Jr. was hired by Henn's Swap Shop Racing for both the 12 Hours of Sebring and the Road America Pabst 500 but these resulted in two DNFs.

Away from IMSA, Paul tried his hand at CART racing, winning the 1983 Michigan 500 in only his fourth Indycar start. After leading 66 of the 250 laps aboard the VDS Associates's Penske PC10, he passed Rick Mears on the last lap and took the checkered flag seconds later as Mears spun and crashed behind him. With a second place in the Caesars Palace Grand Prix (Las Vegas) and a further two third places, he would go on to finish eighth in points in 1983. Meanwhile, another new series, another victory first time out. This time in the Trans-Am series, he won for DeAtley Motorsports at Trois-Rivières.

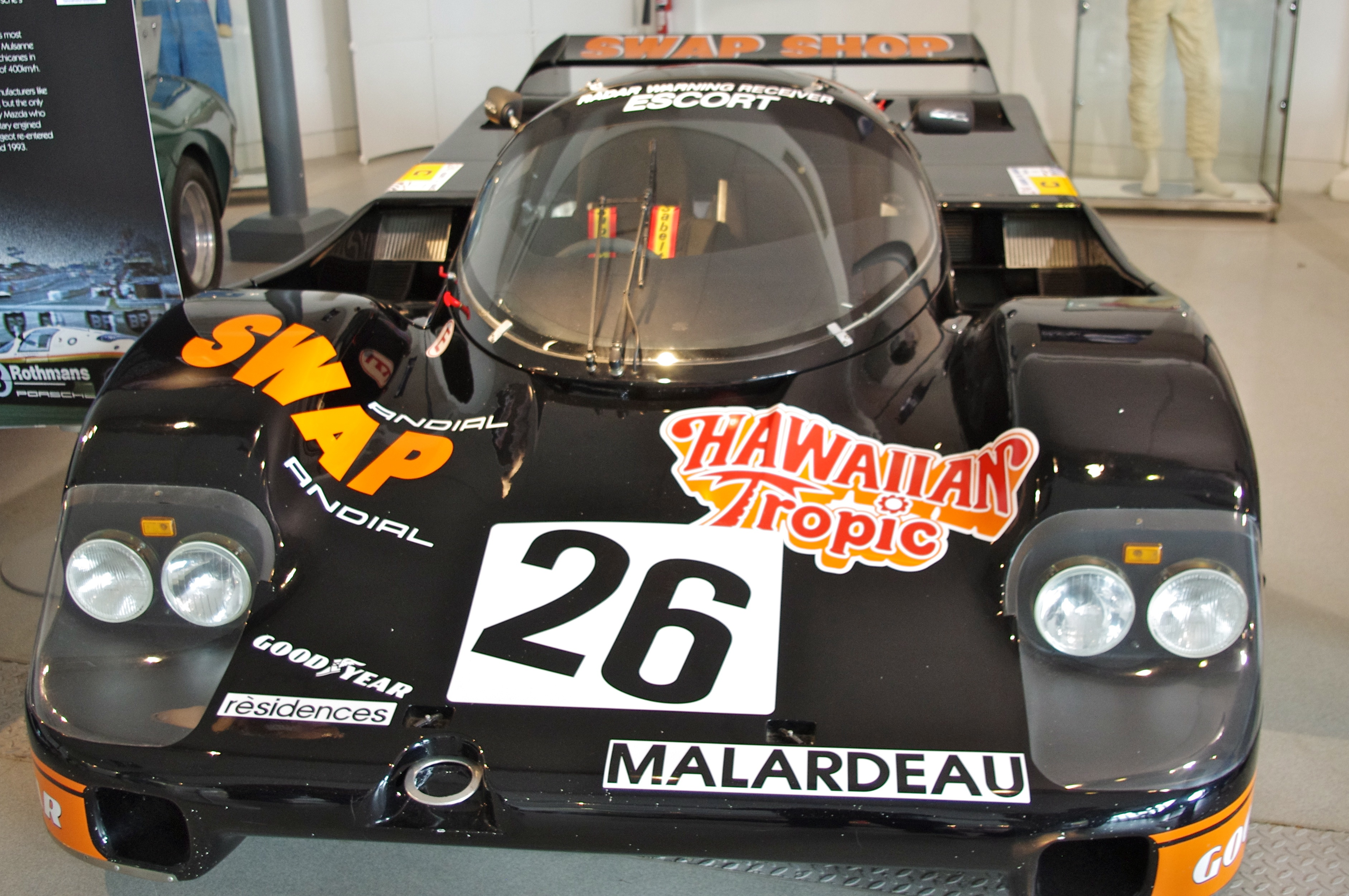
Car that Paul co-drove to second place in 1984 24 Hours of Le Mans

In 1984, Paul finished second in the 1984 24 Hours of Le Mans with Jean Rondeau in a Preston Henn's T-Bird Swap Shop Porsche 956. He also finished second in the Six Hours of Watkins Glen, this time driving with Bruce Leven in his Bayside Disposal Racing Porsche 962. After this race, he was offered a seat alongside John Morton, by Conte Racing. Apart from an eighth place in Road America, Paul and Morton did not finish any races aboard the March-Chevrolet 84G. The CART scene did not fare much better. Although he entered nine of the sixteen races, this was for four different teams. The best result was a third-place in the Caesars Palace Grand Prix, for Provimi Veal Racing, in their March-Cosworth 84C.

Paul Sr. was finally indicted, tried, and convicted, in 1985. Paul Jr. started the season with Conte Racing, who had switched to Buick engines, but these proved to be unreliable. In total, he had 11 DNFs in 11 IMSA starts. After wrecking his AMI Racing March-Cosworth 85C in Indianapolis 500, he would finish only one race, the Budweiser Cleveland Grand Prix in 17th.

Early in 1986, Paul broke his string of seventeen IMSA DNFs by finishing second at Road Atlanta alongside Whitney Ganz for RC Buick Hawk, in their March-Buick 85G.

=== 1990s ===
Following his release from prison in October 1988, Paul returned to racing in 1989. In CART, he only drove in the Indianapolis 500 from 1990 to 1994, but he made his comeback in IMSA. His first season back he drove in six races for five teams. The best result was a fourth place in the Grand Prix of San Antonio for Momo/Gebhardt Racing.

A full-time return to sportscar racing was possible in 1990, when he was offered a ride by Jim Busby, who had entered a Nissan GTP ZX-Turbo. In only his second race for the team, Paul and Kevin Cogan were on the podium after taking second place in the Grand Prix of Miami. Following a fifth place in Sebring, the Nissan was maintained by Seabrooke Racing. He ended the season with two second places in the World Challenge of Tampa and Grand Prix of Greater San Diego (Del Mar). His reward was eighth in the overall standings, but as he found, a lot of things had changed in these four seasons he missed. Full factory supported teams like Tom Walkinshaw Racing (Jaguar), Electramotive (Nissan) and All American Racers (Toyota) were now the ones to beat.

In 1991, Paul ran a short IMSA schedule, taking in just seven races. Although the bulk of these were with Gunnar Racing in their Gunnar 966, it was in Hotchkiss Racing's underpowered Spice-Pontiac SE90P that he earned a second place in the Grand Prix of Greater San Diego. Paul Jr. also drove two NASCAR Winston Cup Series races, in a Chevrolet for Team Ireland both in 1991, recording a best result of 16th in the Budweiser at The Glen.

During the 1992 season, Paul experienced his first ever GTU class win in Leitzinger Racing's Nissan 240SX, which he shared with Butch Leitzinger and David Loring, the 12 Hours of Sebring. He accepted an offer from Giampiero Moretti to race at Watkins Glen, where the pair finished sixth in a Joest Racing Porsche 962. Another outing for Hotchkiss Racing resulted in 8th in Laguna Seca in their Spice-Pontiac. This was followed by three more races with Moretti, but Paul ended the season by trying yet another car, the Intrepid RM-1, but this resulted in another DNF.

The 1993 season started with Paul co-driving with Moretti along with Derek Bell at the Daytona and Sebring endurance races in a Nissan NPT-90. The trio were joined by Massimo Sigala for Daytona, and were leading when the car began to experience engine problems, but it still finished sixth. Sebring proved kinder to them, as they finished second. Paul then switched to Gunnar Racing for a few races. He was able to take one last podium finish, a second-place at Road American, driving a Porsche 962 for Joest Racing.

1994 saw IMSA become the World Sports Cars Championship [WSC] and Paul only raced twice in the new series. He joined Dyson Racing for the inaugural race, the Rolex 24 at Daytona. An oil pump problem with their Spice DR-3 saw another DNF for Paul and company. He was asked back to partner James Weaver at the Indy Grand Prix, a two-hour race around the Indianapolis Raceway Park. They finished second.

For 1995, Paul would race for Dyson Racing in the WSC and for the Prototype Technology Group (BMW M3) in the IMSA GTS, as many races were at the same event. He recorded two top three finishes for Dyson aboard their Riley & Scott Mk III: second place with Butch Leitzinger in the Moosehead Grand Prix, and a third place with Andy Wallace in the Texas World Grand Prix.

Paul continued with Dyson Racing into 1996. Paul recorded four top three finishes in the last four races, including wins at the Mosport 500 and the Daytona IMSA finale, while co-driving with Leitzinger. He finished the season sixth in the overall standings. 1996 also saw the formation of the Indy Racing League, and this gave Paul a second shot at a competitive Indycar career. Despite driving a two-year-old car for a new team, PDM Racing, he led 22 laps in that year's Las Vegas 500 before finishing fifteenth.

In 1997, Paul competed with a contemporary IndyCar for the first time since 1985, and promptly finished 15th in the points. He also competed in the WSC with Dyson Racing. He continued where he left off in 1996 by winning at Daytona. His victory in the Rolex 24 at Daytona came as part of seven driver crew. This was followed by two victories, partnering Leitzinger in the Sportscar Grand Prix and VISA Sports Car Championship.

Paul started the 1998 season with PDM Racing and Team Pelfrey before landing a competitive ride with Byrd-Cunningham Racing. He broke through to win the 1998 Lone Star 500 at Texas Motor Speedway and finished an IRL career best eelventh in points.

In his seven Indy 500 starts, Paul had a best finish of seventh in 1998. He made his last IRL start the following season.

In 1999, Paul again competed at Daytona in the 24 Hour race, this time with Corvette Racing in the debut race for the Corvette C5-R. He shared the #2 C5-R with Ron Fellows and Chris Kneifel to a third-place finish in the GT2 Class. He also competed at Sebring in 1999 with Corvette Racing in the #3 Corvette C5-R, again with Fellows and Kneifel.

=== 2000s ===
The new millennium saw Paul return to his roots, sports car racing. He teamed up with Dyson Racing once again, and recorded four top three finishes, the best being a second in the U.S. Road Racing Classic, a 250-mile race at Mid-Ohio.

== Drug trafficking ==
Paul was lured into the drug trade at the age of 15, just to be with his father. His first legal troubles were on January 10, 1979, when he and another accomplice were caught by customs agents loading equipment onto a pickup truck on the bank of a canal in the Louisiana bayous after dark. Following questioning, when one of them smelled cannabis on their clothing, his father was apprehended on his 42-foot boat named Lady Royale, where customs discovered residue of marijuana and $10,000 on board. A rented truck was discovered nearby, which contained 1,565 pounds (710 kg) of marijuana. In court, all three pleaded guilty to marijuana possession charges, where each was placed on three years' probation and fined $32,500.

Paul's racing career was interrupted in May 1986, when he was sentenced to five years in prison for his involvement in a drug trafficking ring with his father and subsequent refusal to testify against him. He was sent to a minimum-security prison in Alabama. He served a total of 30 months, being released in October 1988.

== Retirement and death ==
Paul retired from professional racing in 2001 after noticing that the telemetry of the Corvette GT-1 he was testing did not match what he thought his feet were doing in the car. A subsequent medical evaluation confirmed he had Huntington's disease, a progressive neurological disorder.

In 2018, author and racing journalist Sylvia Wilkinson published a book about Paul, titled 50/50, The Story of Champion Race Car Driver John Paul Jr. and his Battle with Huntington's Disease.

Paul died on December 29, 2020, in Woodland Hills, California.

== Racing record ==
=== Career highlights ===
Season	Series	Position	Team	Car
1979	CASC/SCCA Formula Atlantic Championship	13th		Ralt-Ford RT1/79
1980	IMSA GT Series	4th	Preston Henn; JLP Racing	Porsche 935 K3; Porsche 935 JLP-2
	FIA World Challenge for Endurance Drivers	19th	Preston Henn; JLP Racing	Porsche 935 K3; Porsche 935 JLP-2
1981	Camel GT Championship	2nd	JLP Racing	Porsche 935 JLP-3; Lola- Chevrolet T600
	Formula Super Vee USA Robert Bosch/Valvoline Championship	14th	JLP Racing	Ralt-Volkswagen RT5
	FIA World Endurance Championship of Drivers	112th	JLP Racing	Porsche 935 JLP-2
1982	Camel GT Championship	**1st**	JLP Racing	Porsche 935 JLP-3; Lola-Chevrolet T600; Porsche 935 JLP-4
	Deutsche Rennsport Meisterschaft	22nd	Siegfried Brunn	Porsche 908/3 Turbo
	FIA World Endurance Championship of Drivers	70th	Kremer Racing	Kremer-Porsche CK5
1983	PPG Indy Car World Series	8th	VDS Associates	Penske-Cosworth PC-10
	Camel GT Championship	27th	JLP Racing; Henn's Swap Shop Racing	Porsche 935 JLP-3; Lola-Chevrolet T600; Porsche 935L
1984	PPG Indy Car World Series	17th	Team VDS; Primus Racing; Patrick Racing; Provimi Veal	Penske-Cosworth PC-10/82; Primus-Cosworth 84; March-Cosworth 84C
	FIA World Endurance Championship	35th	Henn's T-Bird Swap Shop Racing	Porsche 956
	Camel GT Championship	38th	Bayside Disposal Racing; Conte Racing; Pegasus Racing	Porsche 962; March-Chevrolet 84G; March-Buick 85G
1985	Camel GT Championship	60th	Conte Racing; Pegasus Racing	March-Buick 85G; March-Buick 84G
1986	Camel GT Championship	34th	Conte Racing	March-Buick 85G
1989	Camel GT Championship	22nd	Bayside Disposal Racing; Phoenix Racing Cars; Momo-Gebhradt Racing	Porsche 962; Phoenix-Chevrolet JG2; Porsche 962C
	Camel Lights Championship	47th	Whitehall Motorsports	Spice-Pontiac SE87L
1990	Camel GT Championship	8th	Busby Racing	Nissan GTP ZX-Turbo
1991	Camel GT Championship	21st	Dyson Racing; Gunnar Porsche; John Shapiro; Hotchkis Racing	Porsche 962C; Gunnar-Porsche 966; Porsche 962GTi; Spice-Pontiac SE89P
	NASCAR Winston Cup Series	56th	Team Ireland	Chevrolet Lumina
1992	IMSA GTU Championship	12th	Leitzinger Racing	Nissan 240SX
	Camel GT Championship	13th	Brumos Racing; Joest Racing; Hotchkiss Racing; Tom Milner Racing	Gunnar-Porsche 966; Porsche 962C; Spice-Pontiac SE89P; Intrepid RM-1
	PPG Indy Car World Series	27th	D.B. Mann Development	Lola-Buick T90/00
1993	Camel GT Championship	5th	Momo; Brumos Racing; Joest Racing	Nissan NPT-90; Gunnar-Porsche 966; Porsche 962C
1994	Exxon World Sports Cars Championship	35th	Dyson Racing	Spice-Ferrari DR-3
1995	Exxon World Sports Cars Championship	29th	Dyson Racing	Riley & Scott-Ford Mk III
1996	Exxon World Sports Cars Championship	6th	Dyson Racing	Riley & Scott-Ford Mk III
	Indy Racing League	15th	PDM Racing	Lola-Cosworth T93/00; Lola-Menard T93/00
1996–97	Indy Racing League	15th	PDM Racing	Lola-Menard T93/00; Lola-Menard T95/00; Dallara-Oldsmobile IR7; G-Force-Oldsmobile GF01
1997	Exxon World Sports Cars Championship	11th	Dyson Racing	Riley & Scott-Ford Mk III
1998	Pep Boys Indy Racing League	11th	PDM Racing; Team Pelfrey; Byrd-Cunningham Racing	G-Force-Oldsmobile GF01B
1999	United States Road Racing Championship – SportsRacing Prototypes	20th	Dyson Racing	Riley & Scott-Ford Mk III
	Pep Boys Indy Racing League	28th	Nienhouse Motorsports; Byrd-Cunningham Racing	G-Force-Oldsmobile GF01C
	American Le Mans Series – GTS	36th	Corvette Racing	Chevrolet Corvette C5-R
2000	Rolex Sports Car Series	15th	Dyson Racing	Riley & Scott-Lincoln Mk III
	American Le Mans Series – GTS	29th	Konrad Motorsport; Patriot Motorsport	Porsche 911 GT2; Dodge Viper GTS-R
2001	Rolex Sports Car Series	45th	Konrad Motorsport	Lola-Ford B2K/10

=== American Open Wheel racing results ===
(key) (Races in bold indicate pole position)

==== CART ====
Year	Team	1	2	3	4	5	6	7	8	9	10	11	12	13	14	15	16	17	Rank	Points	Ref
1982	Miller Beer	PHX	ATL	MIL	CLE	MCH	MIL	POC	RIV	ROA; 21	MCH	PHX							**49th**	**0**	
1983	Racing Team VDS	ATL; 3	INDY; DNQ	MIL	CLE; 21	MCH; 1	ROA; 5	POC; 29	RIV; 3	MOH; 20	MCH; 7	**CPL**; 2	LAG; 26	PHX; 11					**8th**	**84**	
1984	Racing Team VDS	LBH; 20	PHX; DNS	INDY; DNQ	MIL	POR	MEA	CLE											**17th**	**28**	
1984	Primus Racing								MCH; DNS		POC; 17								**17th**	**28**	
1984	Patrick Racing									ROA; 6									**17th**	**28**	
1984	Provimi Veal											MOH; 9	SAN	MCH; 22	PHX	LAG; 11	CPL; 3		**17th**	**28**	
1985	AMI Racing	LBH	INDY; 15	MIL	POR	MEA	CLE; 17	MCH	ROA	POC	MOH	SAN	MCH	LAG	PHX	MIA			**43rd**	**0**	
1986	Team ASC	PHX	LBH	INDY; Wth	MIL	POR	MEA	CLE	TOR	MCH	POC	MOH	SAN	MCH	ROA	LAG	PHX	MIA	NC	–	
1989	Mann Motorsports	PHX	LBH	INDY; DNQ	MIL	DET; 19	POR									LAG; DNQ			**44th**	**0**	
1989	Bettenhausen Motorsports							CLE; 16	MEA; 21	TOR									**44th**	**0**	
1989	Dale Coyne Racing										MCH; DNQ	POC	MOH	ROA	NAZ				**44th**	**0**	
1990	Mann Motorsports	PHX	LBH	INDY; 16	MIL	DET	POR	CLE	MEA	TOR	MCH	DEN	VAN	MOH	ROA	NAZ	LAG		**37th**	**0**	
1991	Mann Racing	SRF	LBH	PHX	INDY; 25	MIL	DET	POR	CLE	MEA	TOR	MCH	DEN	VAN	MOH	ROA	NAZ	LAG	**49th**	**0**	
1992	Mann Development	SRF	PHX	LBH	INDY; 10	DET	POR	MIL	NHA	TOR	MCH	CLE	ROA	VAN	MOH	NAZ	LAG		**29th**	**3**	
1993	D.B. Mann	SRF	PHX	LBH	INDY; DNQ	MIL	DET	POR	CLE	TOR	MCH	NHM	ROA	VAN	MOH	NZR	LAG		NC	–	
1994	ProFormance Motorsports	SRF	PHX; 18	LBH	INDY; 25	MIL	DET	POR	CLE	TOR	MCH	MOH	NHM	VAN	ROA	NZR	LAG		**45th**	**0**	

==== IndyCar ====
Indy Racing League results
Year	Team	1	2	3	4	5	6	7	8	9	10	11	12	13	Rank	Points	Ref
1996	PDM Racing	WDW; 9	PHX; 14	INDY; 31											**15th**	**153**	
1996–97	PDM Racing	NHM; 10	LVS; 15	WDW; 18	PHX; 9	INDY; Wth	TXS	PPIR	CLT; 11	NH2; 7	LVS; 12				**15th**	**163**	
1998	PDM Racing	WDW; 10	PHX; 19												**11th**	**216**	
1998	Team Pelfrey			INDY; 7											**11th**	**216**	
1998	Byrd-Cunningham Racing				TXS; 16	NHM; 26	DOV; 21	CLT; 6	PPIR; 15	ATL; 23	TXS; 1	LVS; 4			**11th**	**216**	
1999	Byrd-Cunningham Racing	WDW; 11	PHX; 22	CLT; C	INDY; Wth	TXS	PPIR	ATL	DOV	PPI2	LVS				**28th**	**39**	
1999	McCormack Motorsports											TXS; 18			**28th**	**39**	
2001	Zali Racing	PHX	HMS	ATL	INDY; DNQ	TXS	PPIR	RIR	KAN	NSH	KTY	STL	CHI	TX2	NC	–	

=== Indianapolis 500 results ===
Year	Chassis	Engine	Start	Finish	Ref
1983	Penske	Cosworth	Practice Crash		
1984	Penske	Cosworth	Practice Crash		
1985	March	Cosworth	24th	15th	
1986	March	Buick	Failed to Qualify		
1989	March	Cosworth	Failed to Qualify		
1990	Lola	Buick	32nd	16th	
1991	Lola	Buick	25th	25th	
1992	Lola	Buick	19th	10th	
1993	Lola	Buick	Qualifying Crash		
1994	Lola	Ilmor	30th	25th	
1996	Lola	Menard-Buick	17th	31st	
1997	Dallara	Oldsmobile	Practice Crash		
1998	Dallara	Oldsmobile	16th	7th	
1999	G-Force	Oldsmobile	Practice Crash		
2001	G-Force	Oldsmobile	Failed to Qualify		

=== NASCAR ===
(key) (Bold – Pole position awarded by qualifying time. Italics – Pole position earned by points standings or practice time. * – Most laps led.)

==== Winston Cup Series ====
NASCAR Winston Cup Series results
Year	Team	No.	Make	1	2	3	4	5	6	7	8	9	10	11	12	13	14	15	16	17	18	19	20	21	22	23	24	25	26	27	28	29	NWCC	Pts	Ref
1991	Team Ireland	53	Chevy	DAY	RCH	CAR	ATL	DAR	BRI	NWS	MAR	TAL	CLT	DOV	SON	POC	MCH	DAY	POC; 32	TAL	GLN; 16	MCH; DNQ	BRI	DAR	RCH	DOV	MAR	NWS	CLT	CAR	PHO	ATL	56th	182	

=== Complete 24 Hours of Le Mans results ===
Year	Class	No	Tyres	Car	Team	Co-Drivers	Laps	Pos.	Class Pos.	Ref
1980	IMSA	73	**G**	Porsche 935 JLP-2	(United States) J.L.P. Racing	(United States) John Paul Sr. (United Kingdom) Guy Edwards	312	9th	2nd	
1982	IMSA; GTX	72	**D**	Ferrari 512BB/LM	(United States) North American Racing Team	(France) Alain Cudini (United States) John Morton	306	9th	4th	
1984	C1	26	**G**	Porsche 956	(United States) Henn's T-Bird Swap Shop	(France) Jean Rondeau	358	2nd		
1995	GT1	30	**G**	Chevrolet Corvette ZR-1	(United States) ZR1 Corvette Team	(Canada) Chris McDougall (United States) James Mero	57	DNF		

=== Complete 24 Hours of Daytona results ===
Year	Class	No	Tyres	Car	Team	Co-Drivers	Laps	Pos.	Class Pos.	Ref
1981	GTX	18		Porsche 935 JLP-2	(United States) JLP Racing	(United States) John Paul Sr. (United States) Gordon Smiley	53	DNF; Piston		
1982	GTP	8		Porsche 935 JLP-2	(United States) JLP Racing	(United States) John Paul Sr. (Germany) Rolf Stommelen		DNS		
1982	GTP	18	G	Porsche 935 JLP-3	(United States) JLP Racing	(United States) John Paul Sr. (Germany) Rolf Stommelen	719	**1st**		
1983	GTP	1	G	Porsche 935/JLP-3	(United States) JLP Racing	(United States) Rene Rodriguez (United States) Joe Castellano	412	DNF; Turbocharger		
1985	GTP	45	G	March-Buick 85G	(United States) Conte Racing	(Canada) Bill Adam (United States) Whitney Ganz	358	DNF; Suspension		
1986	GTP	45	G	March-Buick 85G	(United States) RC Buick Hawk/Conte	(United States) Chip Ganassi (Italy) Ivan Capelli (United States) Whitney Ganz	310	DNF; Engine		
1989	GTP	85	G	Porsche 962	(United States) Texaco Havoline Star Bayside Motorsports	(United States) Bruce Leven (United States) Rob Dyson (United States) Dominic Dobson	347	DNF; Piston		
1990	GTP	67	BF	Nissan GTP ZX-Turbo	(United States) BFG/Miller High Life	(United States) Kevin Cogan (Italy) Mauro Baldi	397	DNF; Engine		
1991	GTP	16	G	Porsche 962C	(United States) Dyson Racing	(United Kingdom) James Weaver (United Kingdom) Tiff Needell	450	DNF; Oil Pump		
1993	GTP	30	G	Nissan NPT-90	(Italy) Momo	(Italy) Giampiero Moretti (United Kingdom) Derek Bell (Italy) Massimo Sigala	645	DNF (6th); Engine		
1994	WSC	16	G	Spice-Ferrari DR-3	(United States) Dyson Racing	(United Kingdom) James Weaver (United States) Rob Dyson (United States) Scott Sharp	339	DNF; Oil Pump		
1995	GTS-2	12	Y	BMW M3	(United States) Prototype Technology Group	(Austria) Dieter Quester (United States) Pete Halsmer (United States) David Donohue	221	DNF; Engine		
1996	GTS-2	06	Y	BMW M3	(United States) Prototype Technology Group	(Costa Rica) Javier Quiros (United States) Pete Halsmer (United States) David Donohue	638	6th	3rd	
1997	WSC	16	G	Riley & Scott-Ford Mk III	(United States) Dyson Racing	(United Kingdom) Andy Wallace (United States) Butch Leitzinger (United Kingdom) James Weaver	227	DNF		
1997	WSC	20	G	Riley & Scott-Ford Mk III	(United States) Dyson Racing	(United States) Elliott Forbes-Robinson (United States) John Schneider (United States) Rob Dyson (United States) Butch Leitzinger (United Kingdom) Andy Wallace (United Kingdom) James Weaver	690	**1st**		
1998	CA	20	G	Riley & Scott-Ford Mk III	(United States) Dyson Racing	(United States) Butch Leitzinger (United Kingdom) Perry McCarthy (United States) Rob Dyson	615	DNF; Engine		
1999	GT2	2	G	Chevrolet Corvette C5-R	(United States) Corvette Racing	(Canada) Ron Fellows (United States) Chris Kneifel	600	18th	3rd	

=== Complete 12 Hours of Sebring results ===
Year	Class	No	Tyres	Car	Team	Co-Drivers	Laps	Pos.	Class Pos.	Ref
1981	GTX	8	G	Porsche 935 JLP-3	(United States) JLP Racing	(United States) John Paul Sr.	40	DNF; Suspension		
1982	GTP	18	G	Porsche 935 JLP-3	(United States) JLP Racing	(United States) John Paul Sr.	244	**1st**		
1983	GTP	09	G	Porsche 935 L	(United States) Henn's Swap Shop Racing	(United Kingdom) Derek Bell (United States) Michael Andretti	125	DNF; Engine		
1985	GTP	3		March-Buick 84G	(United States) Pegasus Racing	(United States) Ken Madren (United States) Wayne Pickering	38	DNF; Clutch		
1986	GTP	46	G	March-Buick 85G	(United States) R C Buick Hawk	(United States) Whitney Ganz (United States) Ken Madren	151	DNF; Engine		
1990	GTP	67	BF	Nissan GTP ZX-Turbo	(United States) Busby Racing	(United States) Kevin Cogan	286	5th	4th	
1991	GTP	24	G	Porsche 962 GTi	(United States) John Shapiro	(United Kingdom) James Weaver	218	DNF; Suspension		
1992	GTU	96	T	Nissan 240SX	(United States) Leitzinger Racing	(United States) David Loring	301	8th	**1st**	
1993	GTP	30	G	Nissan NPT-90	(Italy) Momo	(Italy) Giampiero Moretti (United Kingdom) Derek Bell	228	2nd		
1994	GTS	72	G	Porsche 911 Turbo	(United States) Champion Porsche	(Canada) Bill Adam (United States) Victor Gonzalez	91	DNF; Mechanical		
1995	GTS-2	12	Y	BMW M3	(United States) Prototype Technology Group	(Austria) Dieter Quester	228	20th	8th	
1996	WSC	16	G	Riley & Scott-Ford Mk III	(United States) Dyson Racing	(United States) Rob Dyson (United Kingdom) James Weaver	262	24th	7th	
1997	WSC	20	G	Riley & Scott-Ford Mk III	(United States) Dyson Racing	(United States) Elliott Forbes-Robinson (United States) John Schneider	263	5th		
1999	GTS	3	G	Chevrolet Corvette C5-R	(United States) Corvette Racing	(Canada) Ron Fellows (United States) Chris Kneifel	262	23rd	4th	
2000	GTS	33	D	Porsche 911 GT2	(Germany) Konrad Motorsport	(Austria) Franz Konrad (United States) Charles Slater	307	12th	4th	

Awards
Preceded by None	Scott Brayton Trophy; 1997	Succeeded by Roberto Guerrero
