= 1992 Coca-Cola 600 =

Tenth race of the 1992 NASCAR Winston Cup Series

Race details
- Race 10 of 29 in the 1992 NASCAR Winston Cup Series
- The 1992 Coca-Cola 600 program cover, with artwork by NASCAR artist Sam Bass.
- Date: May 24, 1992
- Official name: 33rd Annual Coca-Cola 600
- Location: Concord, North Carolina, Charlotte Motor Speedway
- Course: Permanent racing facility
- Course length: 1.5 miles (2.41 km)
- Distance: 400 laps, 600 mi (965.606 km)
- Average speed: 132.98 miles per hour (214.01 km/h)

Pole position
| Driver | Bill Elliott | Junior Johnson & Associates |
- Time: 30.773

Most laps led
| Driver | Kyle Petty | SABCO Racing |
- Laps: 141

Winner
| No. 3 | Dale Earnhardt | Richard Childress Racing |

Television in the United States
- Network: TBS
- Announcers: Ken Squier, Neil Bonnett

Radio in the United States
- Radio: Performance Racing Network

The 1992 Coca-Cola 600 was the 10th stock car race of the 1992 NASCAR Winston Cup Series season and the 33rd iteration of the event. The race was held on Sunday, May 24, 1992, in Concord, North Carolina, at Charlotte Motor Speedway, a 1.5 miles (2.4 km) permanent quad-oval. The race took the scheduled 400 laps to complete. At race's end, Richard Childress Racing driver Dale Earnhardt would manage to make a late-race pass with 54 to go for the lead to take his 53rd career NASCAR Winston Cup Series victory and his only victory of the season. To fill out the top three, Morgan–McClure Motorsports driver Ernie Irvan and SABCO Racing driver Kyle Petty would finish second and third, respectively.

== Background ==
The layout of Charlotte Motor Speedway, the venue where the race was held.

Charlotte Motor Speedway is a motorsports complex located in Concord, North Carolina, United States 13 miles from Charlotte, North Carolina. The complex features a 1.5 miles (2.4 km) quad oval track that hosts NASCAR racing including the prestigious Coca-Cola 600 on Memorial Day weekend and the NEXTEL All-Star Challenge, as well as the UAW-GM Quality 500. The speedway was built in 1959 by Bruton Smith and is considered the home track for NASCAR with many race teams located in the Charlotte area. The track is owned and operated by Speedway Motorsports Inc. (SMI) with Marcus Smith (son of Bruton Smith) as track president.

=== Entry list ===
- (R) denotes rookie driver.

| # | Driver | Team | Make |
|---|---|---|---|
| 0 | Delma Cowart | H. L. Waters Racing | Ford |
| 1 | Rick Mast | Precision Products Racing | Oldsmobile |
| 2 | Rusty Wallace | Penske Racing South | Pontiac |
| 3 | Dale Earnhardt | Richard Childress Racing | Chevrolet |
| 4 | Ernie Irvan | Morgan–McClure Motorsports | Chevrolet |
| 5 | Ricky Rudd | Hendrick Motorsports | Chevrolet |
| 6 | Mark Martin | Roush Racing | Ford |
| 7 | Alan Kulwicki | AK Racing | Ford |
| 8 | Dick Trickle | Stavola Brothers Racing | Ford |
| 9 | Dave Mader III | Melling Racing | Ford |
| 10 | Derrike Cope | Whitcomb Racing | Chevrolet |
| 11 | Bill Elliott | Junior Johnson & Associates | Ford |
| 12 | Hut Stricklin | Bobby Allison Motorsports | Chevrolet |
| 15 | Geoff Bodine | Bud Moore Engineering | Ford |
| 16 | Wally Dallenbach Jr. | Roush Racing | Ford |
| 17 | Darrell Waltrip | Darrell Waltrip Motorsports | Chevrolet |
| 18 | Dale Jarrett | Joe Gibbs Racing | Chevrolet |
| 20 | Joe Ruttman | Moroso Racing | Oldsmobile |
| 21 | Morgan Shepherd | Wood Brothers Racing | Ford |
| 22 | Sterling Marlin | Junior Johnson & Associates | Ford |
| 23 | Eddie Bierschwale | B&B Racing | Oldsmobile |
| 25 | Ken Schrader | Hendrick Motorsports | Chevrolet |
| 26 | Brett Bodine | King Racing | Ford |
| 27 | Gary Balough | Linro Motorsports | Chevrolet |
| 28 | Davey Allison | Robert Yates Racing | Ford |
| 30 | Michael Waltrip | Bahari Racing | Pontiac |
| 31 | Bobby Hillin Jr. | Team Ireland | Chevrolet |
| 32 | Randy Porter | Porter Racing | Pontiac |
| 33 | Harry Gant | Leo Jackson Motorsports | Oldsmobile |
| 41 | Greg Sacks | Larry Hedrick Motorsports | Chevrolet |
| 42 | Kyle Petty | SABCO Racing | Pontiac |
| 43 | Richard Petty | Petty Enterprises | Pontiac |
| 48 | James Hylton | Hylton Motorsports | Pontiac |
| 49 | Stanley Smith | BS&S Motorsports | Chevrolet |
| 52 | Jimmy Means | Jimmy Means Racing | Pontiac |
| 55 | Ted Musgrave | RaDiUs Motorsports | Oldsmobile |
| 66 | Jimmy Hensley (R) | Cale Yarborough Motorsports | Ford |
| 68 | Bobby Hamilton | TriStar Motorsports | Oldsmobile |
| 71 | Dave Marcis | Marcis Auto Racing | Chevrolet |
| 73 | Phil Barkdoll | Barkdoll Racing | Oldsmobile |
| 77 | Mike Potter | Balough Racing | Chevrolet |
| 83 | Lake Speed | Speed Racing | Ford |
| 85 | Mike Skinner | Mansion Motorsports | Chevrolet |
| 89 | Jim Sauter | Mueller Brothers Racing | Pontiac |
| 90 | Charlie Glotzbach | Donlavey Racing | Ford |
| 94 | Terry Labonte | Hagan Racing | Ford |
| 95 | Bob Schacht (R) | Sadler Brothers Racing | Chevrolet |
| 98 | Jimmy Spencer | Travis Carter Enterprises | Chevrolet |

== Qualifying ==
Qualifying was split into two rounds. The first round was held on Wednesday, May 20, at 3:00 PM EST. Each driver would have one lap to set a time. During the first round, the top 20 drivers in the round would be guaranteed a starting spot in the race. If a driver was not able to guarantee a spot in the first round, they had the option to scrub their time from the first round and try and run a faster lap time in a second round qualifying run, held on Thursday, May 21, at 2:00 PM EST. As with the first round, each driver would have one lap to set a time. For this specific race, positions 21-40 would be decided on time, and depending on who needed it, a select amount of positions were given to cars who had not otherwise qualified but were high enough in owner's points; up to two were given. If needed, a past champion who did not qualify on either time or provisionals could use a champion's provisional, adding one more spot to the field.

Bill Elliott, driving for Junior Johnson & Associates, would win the pole, setting a time of 30.773 and an average speed of 175.479 miles per hour (282.406 km/h) in the first round.

Six drivers would fail to qualify.

=== Full qualifying results ===
| Pos. | # | Driver | Team | Make | Time | Speed |
|---|---|---|---|---|---|---|
| 1 | 11 | Bill Elliott | Junior Johnson & Associates | Ford | 30.773 | 175.479 |
| 2 | 42 | Kyle Petty | SABCO Racing | Pontiac | 30.795 | 175.353 |
| 3 | 5 | Ricky Rudd | Hendrick Motorsports | Chevrolet | 30.814 | 175.245 |
| 4 | 26 | Brett Bodine | King Racing | Ford | 30.838 | 175.109 |
| 5 | 6 | Mark Martin | Roush Racing | Ford | 30.907 | 174.718 |
| 6 | 25 | Ken Schrader | Hendrick Motorsports | Chevrolet | 30.952 | 174.464 |
| 7 | 2 | Rusty Wallace | Penske Racing South | Pontiac | 30.996 | 174.216 |
| 8 | 7 | Alan Kulwicki | AK Racing | Ford | 31.011 | 174.132 |
| 9 | 22 | Sterling Marlin | Junior Johnson & Associates | Ford | 31.075 | 173.773 |
| 10 | 8 | Dick Trickle | Stavola Brothers Racing | Ford | 31.132 | 173.455 |
| 11 | 4 | Ernie Irvan | Morgan–McClure Motorsports | Chevrolet | 31.182 | 173.177 |
| 12 | 43 | Richard Petty | Petty Enterprises | Pontiac | 31.236 | 172.877 |
| 13 | 3 | Dale Earnhardt | Richard Childress Racing | Chevrolet | 31.243 | 172.839 |
| 14 | 94 | Terry Labonte | Hagan Racing | Oldsmobile | 31.261 | 172.739 |
| 15 | 30 | Michael Waltrip | Bahari Racing | Pontiac | 31.270 | 172.689 |
| 16 | 55 | Ted Musgrave | RaDiUs Motorsports | Ford | 31.274 | 172.667 |
| 17 | 28 | Davey Allison | Robert Yates Racing | Ford | 31.275 | 172.662 |
| 18 | 17 | Darrell Waltrip | Darrell Waltrip Motorsports | Chevrolet | 31.294 | 172.557 |
| 19 | 15 | Geoff Bodine | Bud Moore Engineering | Ford | 31.303 | 172.507 |
| 20 | 66 | Jimmy Hensley (R) | Cale Yarborough Motorsports | Ford | 31.339 | 172.309 |
Failed to lock in Round 1
| 21 | 9 | Dave Mader III | Melling Racing | Ford | 31.221 | 172.961 |
| 22 | 68 | Bobby Hamilton | TriStar Motorsports | Oldsmobile | 31.386 | 172.051 |
| 23 | 18 | Dale Jarrett | Joe Gibbs Racing | Chevrolet | 31.391 | 172.024 |
| 24 | 31 | Bobby Hillin Jr. | Team Ireland | Chevrolet | 31.411 | 171.914 |
| 25 | 21 | Morgan Shepherd | Wood Brothers Racing | Ford | 31.453 | 171.685 |
| 26 | 33 | Harry Gant | Leo Jackson Motorsports | Oldsmobile | 31.472 | 171.581 |
| 27 | 41 | Greg Sacks | Larry Hedrick Motorsports | Chevrolet | 31.527 | 171.282 |
| 28 | 12 | Hut Stricklin | Bobby Allison Motorsports | Chevrolet | 31.551 | 171.151 |
| 29 | 49 | Stanley Smith | BS&S Motorsports | Chevrolet | 31.551 | 171.151 |
| 30 | 10 | Derrike Cope | Whitcomb Racing | Chevrolet | 31.565 | 171.076 |
| 31 | 1 | Rick Mast | Precision Products Racing | Oldsmobile | 31.565 | 171.076 |
| 32 | 20 | Joe Ruttman | Moroso Racing | Oldsmobile | 31.602 | 170.875 |
| 33 | 89 | Jim Sauter | Mueller Brothers Racing | Pontiac | 31.616 | 170.800 |
| 34 | 27 | Gary Balough | Linro Motorsports | Chevrolet | 31.667 | 170.525 |
| 35 | 71 | Dave Marcis | Marcis Auto Racing | Chevrolet | 31.683 | 170.438 |
| 36 | 83 | Lake Speed | Speed Racing | Ford | 31.684 | 170.433 |
| 37 | 98 | Jimmy Spencer | Travis Carter Enterprises | Chevrolet | 31.709 | 170.299 |
| 38 | 16 | Wally Dallenbach Jr. | Roush Racing | Ford | 31.717 | 170.256 |
| 39 | 32 | Randy Porter | Porter Racing | Pontiac | 31.744 | 170.111 |
| 40 | 95 | Bob Schacht (R) | Sadler Brothers Racing | Chevrolet | 31.753 | 170.063 |
Provisionals
| 41 | 52 | Jimmy Means | Jimmy Means Racing | Pontiac | 31.941 | 169.062 |
| 42 | 90 | Charlie Glotzbach | Donlavey Racing | Ford | 33.056 | 163.359 |
Failed to qualify
| 43 | 85 | Mike Skinner | Mansion Motorsports | Chevrolet | 31.818 | 169.715 |
| 44 | 23 | Eddie Bierschwale | B&B Racing | Oldsmobile | -* | -* |
| 45 | 48 | James Hylton | Hylton Motorsports | Pontiac | -* | -* |
| 46 | 0 | Delma Cowart | H. L. Waters Racing | Ford | -* | -* |
| 47 | 77 | Mike Potter | Balough Racing | Chevrolet | -* | -* |
| 48 | 73 | Phil Barkdoll | Barkdoll Racing | Oldsmobile | -* | -* |
Official first round qualifying results
Official starting lineup

== Race results ==
| Fin | St | # | Driver | Team | Make | Laps | Led | Status | Pts | Winnings |
|---|---|---|---|---|---|---|---|---|---|---|
| 1 | 13 | 3 | Dale Earnhardt | Richard Childress Racing | Chevrolet | 400 | 54 | running | 180 | $125,100 |
| 2 | 11 | 4 | Ernie Irvan | Morgan–McClure Motorsports | Chevrolet | 400 | 2 | running | 175 | $67,275 |
| 3 | 2 | 42 | Kyle Petty | SABCO Racing | Pontiac | 400 | 141 | running | 175 | $60,900 |
| 4 | 17 | 28 | Davey Allison | Robert Yates Racing | Ford | 400 | 33 | running | 165 | $45,750 |
| 5 | 26 | 33 | Harry Gant | Leo Jackson Motorsports | Oldsmobile | 400 | 0 | running | 155 | $35,800 |
| 6 | 14 | 94 | Terry Labonte | Hagan Racing | Oldsmobile | 400 | 0 | running | 150 | $27,100 |
| 7 | 8 | 7 | Alan Kulwicki | AK Racing | Ford | 400 | 43 | running | 151 | $39,850 |
| 8 | 16 | 55 | Ted Musgrave | RaDiUs Motorsports | Ford | 399 | 0 | running | 142 | $23,150 |
| 9 | 3 | 5 | Ricky Rudd | Hendrick Motorsports | Chevrolet | 398 | 33 | running | 143 | $30,100 |
| 10 | 10 | 8 | Dick Trickle | Stavola Brothers Racing | Ford | 398 | 0 | running | 134 | $22,800 |
| 11 | 20 | 66 | Jimmy Hensley (R) | Cale Yarborough Motorsports | Ford | 398 | 11 | running | 135 | $17,250 |
| 12 | 23 | 18 | Dale Jarrett | Joe Gibbs Racing | Chevrolet | 397 | 1 | running | 132 | $15,400 |
| 13 | 24 | 31 | Bobby Hillin Jr. | Team Ireland | Chevrolet | 397 | 0 | running | 124 | $11,800 |
| 14 | 1 | 11 | Bill Elliott | Junior Johnson & Associates | Ford | 396 | 0 | running | 121 | $57,600 |
| 15 | 35 | 71 | Dave Marcis | Marcis Auto Racing | Chevrolet | 394 | 0 | running | 118 | $12,975 |
| 16 | 27 | 41 | Greg Sacks | Larry Hedrick Motorsports | Chevrolet | 390 | 6 | running | 120 | $9,750 |
| 17 | 30 | 10 | Derrike Cope | Whitcomb Racing | Chevrolet | 388 | 0 | running | 112 | $11,150 |
| 18 | 7 | 2 | Rusty Wallace | Penske Racing South | Pontiac | 386 | 38 | engine | 114 | $18,050 |
| 19 | 36 | 83 | Lake Speed | Speed Racing | Ford | 385 | 0 | running | 106 | $7,650 |
| 20 | 4 | 26 | Brett Bodine | King Racing | Ford | 378 | 0 | running | 103 | $15,780 |
| 21 | 22 | 68 | Bobby Hamilton | TriStar Motorsports | Oldsmobile | 377 | 0 | engine | 100 | $13,120 |
| 22 | 9 | 22 | Sterling Marlin | Junior Johnson & Associates | Ford | 364 | 0 | running | 97 | $12,160 |
| 23 | 31 | 1 | Rick Mast | Precision Products Racing | Oldsmobile | 348 | 0 | running | 94 | $11,450 |
| 24 | 39 | 32 | Randy Porter | Porter Racing | Pontiac | 322 | 0 | engine | 91 | $6,340 |
| 25 | 15 | 30 | Michael Waltrip | Bahari Racing | Pontiac | 321 | 0 | running | 88 | $10,880 |
| 26 | 6 | 25 | Ken Schrader | Hendrick Motorsports | Chevrolet | 309 | 29 | accident | 90 | $16,845 |
| 27 | 37 | 98 | Jimmy Spencer | Travis Carter Enterprises | Chevrolet | 288 | 1 | engine | 87 | $10,465 |
| 28 | 38 | 16 | Wally Dallenbach Jr. | Roush Racing | Ford | 279 | 0 | engine | 79 | $5,710 |
| 29 | 25 | 21 | Morgan Shepherd | Wood Brothers Racing | Ford | 252 | 0 | accident | 76 | $10,230 |
| 30 | 29 | 49 | Stanley Smith | BS&S Motorsports | Chevrolet | 248 | 0 | no tires | 73 | $5,555 |
| 31 | 40 | 95 | Bob Schacht (R) | Sadler Brothers Racing | Chevrolet | 245 | 0 | engine | 70 | $5,725 |
| 32 | 19 | 15 | Geoff Bodine | Bud Moore Engineering | Ford | 244 | 4 | engine | 72 | $9,975 |
| 33 | 5 | 6 | Mark Martin | Roush Racing | Ford | 234 | 4 | engine | 69 | $14,850 |
| 34 | 28 | 12 | Hut Stricklin | Bobby Allison Motorsports | Chevrolet | 220 | 0 | crank | 61 | $9,850 |
| 35 | 32 | 20 | Joe Ruttman | Moroso Racing | Oldsmobile | 213 | 0 | accident | 58 | $5,250 |
| 36 | 42 | 90 | Charlie Glotzbach | Donlavey Racing | Ford | 194 | 0 | piston | 55 | $5,200 |
| 37 | 33 | 89 | Jim Sauter | Mueller Brothers Racing | Pontiac | 194 | 0 | ignition | 52 | $5,165 |
| 38 | 18 | 17 | Darrell Waltrip | Darrell Waltrip Motorsports | Chevrolet | 185 | 0 | piston | 49 | $14,540 |
| 39 | 21 | 9 | Dave Mader III | Melling Racing | Ford | 184 | 0 | accident | 46 | $10,145 |
| 40 | 34 | 27 | Gary Balough | Linro Motorsports | Chevrolet | 131 | 0 | accident | 43 | $5,100 |
| 41 | 12 | 43 | Richard Petty | Petty Enterprises | Pontiac | 115 | 0 | accident | 40 | $10,600 |
| 42 | 41 | 52 | Jimmy Means | Jimmy Means Racing | Pontiac | 8 | 0 | engine | 37 | $5,100 |
Failed to qualify
| 43 | | 85 | Mike Skinner | Mansion Motorsports | Chevrolet | | | | | |
| 44 | | 23 | Eddie Bierschwale | B&B Racing | Oldsmobile | | | | | |
| 45 | | 48 | James Hylton | Hylton Motorsports | Pontiac | | | | | |
| 46 | | 0 | Delma Cowart | H. L. Waters Racing | Ford | | | | | |
| 47 | | 77 | Mike Potter | Balough Racing | Chevrolet | | | | | |
| 48 | | 73 | Phil Barkdoll | Barkdoll Racing | Oldsmobile | | | | | |
Official race results

== Standings after the race ==
Drivers' Championship standings

| | Pos | Driver | Points |
|---|---|---|---|
| | 1 | Davey Allison | 1,564 |
| | 2 | Bill Elliott | 1,453 (-111) |
| | 3 | Harry Gant | 1,444 (-120) |
| | 4 | Alan Kulwicki | 1,432 (–132) |
| 1 | 5 | Dale Earnhardt | 1,420 (–144) |
| 1 | 6 | Terry Labonte | 1,378 (–186) |
| 2 | 7 | Morgan Shepherd | 1,333 (–231) |
| | 8 | Geoff Bodine | 1,248 (–316) |
| 1 | 9 | Dick Trickle | 1,245 (–319) |
| 1 | 10 | Mark Martin | 1,217 (–347) |
Official driver's standings

- Note: Only the first 10 positions are included for the driver standings.

| Previous race: 1992 Winston 500 | NASCAR Winston Cup Series; 1992 season | Next race: 1992 Budweiser 500 |
