= John Schneider (racing driver) =

American racing driver (born 1938)

John Schneider (born July 14, 1938 in Dallas, Texas) is a former American sports car racing driver.

== Racing career ==
=== 1983 to 1988 ===
Schneider came on the national scene in 1983 driving a Porsche 924 in the IMSA GT Championship GTU class for Performance Motorsports. He stayed in that car through 1985. In 1985, he also began racing a Pontiac Firebird in the Trans-Am Series. In 1986, he moved to Performance Motorsports' new Buick Somerset Trans-Am car and drove a Mazda rotary engine powered Argo in the 24 Hours of Daytona for Outlaw Racing. In 1987, he drove at Daytona in a Cosworth powered Tiga for Cosmik-Roy Baker Racing while continuing to drive the Somerset in Trans-Am. In 1988's 24 Hours of Daytona race, Schneider drove a Porsche powered Royale for Diman Racing and drove a number of other IMSA races in a Tiga for Essex Racing Services. He also raced part-time in Performance Motorsports' Chevrolet Corvette Trans-Am car.

=== 1995 to 2002 ===
Schneider was away from racing from the end of 1988 to 1995. When he returned, he drove a Stillen Nissan 300ZX to a number of strong finishes in the IMSA Supercar Championship. In 1996 he drove an Oldsmobile-powered Spice for Bobby Brown Motorsports in the World Sportscar Championship but had few good results. In 1997, Schneider signed onto an "all star" team to drive the Dyson Racing Riley & Scott Mk III-Cosworth in the 24 Hours of Daytona with co-drivers Rob Dyson, James Weaver, Butch Leitzinger, Andy Wallace, John Paul Jr., and Elliott Forbes-Robinson. The team won the race as many expected. After the win, Schneider again took a lengthy sabbatical from racing, but returned to the 24 at Daytona in 2002 to drive a Chevrolet powered Riley & Scott for TRV Motorsport but the car failed to finish. That was his last professional race.
