= Team Ireland =

Former NASCAR team

- Owner: Martin Birrane
- Series: Winston Cup Series
- Race drivers: John Paul, Jr. Bobby Hillin Jr.
- Manufacturer: Chevrolet

Career
- Debut: 1991 Miller Genuine Draft 500 (Pocono)
- Latest race: 1992 Mello Yello 500 (Charlotte)
- Races competed: 14
- Drivers' Championships: 0
- Race victories: 0
- Pole positions: 0

Team Ireland was a stock car racing team that competed in the NASCAR Winston Cup Series between 1991 and 1992. Owned by Irishman Martin Birrane, the team posted a best finish of thirteenth with driver Bobby Hillin Jr.

== Winston Cup Series ==
=== Car No. 31 history ===
Team Ireland made its debut in the 1991 NASCAR Winston Cup Series season, competing in four races with the No. 53 Chevrolet; the team intended to field IndyCar driver John Paul Jr. in its cars, but after Paul proved to have a hard time adjusting to the heavy NASCAR cars, he was replaced after two races by Bobby Hillin Jr., who joined the team for a planned 15-race schedule in 1992. Changing to the No. 31 and using cars and engines supplied by Richard Childress Racing, the team competed in ten races during the 1992 NASCAR Winston Cup Series season, posting a best finish of 13th in the Coca-Cola 600 at Charlotte Motor Speedway, before being forced to close due to a lack of sponsorship; the team was unable to pay a fine levied by NASCAR for the use of illegal cylinder heads in the Mello Yello 500 in October, and team owner Birrane chose to leave the sport.

==== Car No. 31 results ====
Year	Driver	No.	Make	1	2	3	4	5	6	7	8	9	10	11	12	13	14	15	16	17	18	19	20	21	22	23	24	25	26	27	28	29	NWCC	Pts
1991	John Paul Jr.	53	Chevy	DAY	RCH	CAR	ATL	DAR	BRI	NWS	MAR	TAL	CLT	DOV	SON	POC	MCH	DAY	POC; 32	TAL	GLN; 16	MCH; DNQ	BRI	DAR	RCH	DOV	MAR	NWS						
1991	Bobby Hillin Jr.	53	Chevy																										CLT; 18	CAR; DNQ	PHO	ATL; 32		
1992	Bobby Hillin Jr.	31	Chevy	DAY; 38	CAR	RCH	ATL; 21	DAR; DNQ	BRI	NWS	MAR	TAL; 28	CLT; 13	DOV	SON	POC	MCH; 17	DAY; 25	POC; 25	TAL	GLN; 23	MCH; 26	BRI	DAR; 17	RCH	DOV	MAR	NWS	CLT; 40	CAR	PHO	ATL		
