= Martino Finotto =

Italian racing driver (born 1933)

- Nationality: (Italy) Italian
- Born: 11 November 1933 Camporosso, Italy
- Died: 13 August 2014 (aged 80) Panama City, Panama

Martino Finotto (born 11 November 1933 in Camporosso, Liguria, died Panama City, 13 August 2014) was an Italian racing driver, mainly known for his success in touring car and sports car racing.

In 1979, he was the European Touring Car Champion. He also finished 3rd in 1975, 5th in 1977 and 4th in 1978, abroad a self-run BMW 3.0 CSL, entered under the Jolly Club banner. As team owner, he won the inaugural World Group C Junior Championship in 1983, as well as the 1984 World C2 title, driving with long-time business partner and racing driver Carlo Facetti. Later, he would finish second in the 1990 IMSA Camel Lights championship in the United States.

== Racing career ==
=== The early years ===
Martino Finotto, who made his fortune in the pharmaceutical industry, only started racing internationally in 1971, in the Campionato Italiano di Turismo, taking two successive class titles in 1972 and 1973. During this period, he also started competing in the European Touring Car Championship.

During the 1974 ETCC season, Finotto raced for Jolly Club in both their BMW 3.0 CSL and Ford Escort RS 1600. It was with the ex-works BMW that Finotto first visited the podium, with a second place in the Austria-Trophäe, at the Salzburgring alongside Manfred Mohr. This pair also finished second in the next race, the 500 km Vallelunga. He would not finish in the points again in that season, but still took seventh overall. Having switched to the German Castrol Team Zakspeed outfit for 1975 to race their Escort RS 1600, he immediately returned to the podium, finishing second in the 4 Ore di Monza, with his new partner, Hans Heyer, and again in the Grand Prix Brno. Although he was placed seventh overall, he scored points for being third in class in the Zandvoort Trophy. His last podium finish occurred in the 4 Horas de Jarama, when paired with Umberto Grano and Walter Dona in the Jolly Club-entered Escort. He would end the season in third place in the overall standings. The 1976 season was spoiled by numerous DNFs.

=== Scuderia Finotto & Formula One ===
Finotto briefly flirted with the idea of Formula One. He bought a pair of Brabham BT42s, but after a single test session at Monza, he decided against racing them. Instead, they were leased to Jürg Dubler under the Scuderia Finotto banner for a number of drivers throughout the 1974 season.

=== Return to the ETCC ===
For the following season, Finotto successfully returned to the ETCC with a new partner, Carlo Facetti, and a new car, BMW 3.0 CSL, while participating in the selection of World Championship Group 5 races, in a Porsche 935. The new partnership started with a podium finish in the 1977 24 Hours of Daytona. Despite having to drive their Jolly Club entered Porsche 935 very carefully and with low boost from the start, they did finish second, as well as winning their class.

The return to the ETCC was a winning one. In Finotto's ex-Luigi BMW from the previous season, and joined by Grano for the season opener at Monza, the all-Italian were the only contender for victory once the work-supported Jaguars and Alpina BMWs had retired. This trio followed this with second place at Mugello, albeit three laps behind another Luigi BMW. This result promoted Finotto into second place in the driver's championship. The Enna round was Grano dropped, but Facetti and Finotto lead the 500 km race from start to finish, leading home the clear sweep of the podium by the BMW CSLs of Luigi Racing.

A trip to Czechoslovakia saw Facetti/Finotto triumph once again, beating the more fancied teams for the third time in five rounds. This was after their BMW had survived an engine rebuild following qualifying, helping Facetti move clear in the championship, with Finotto being his nearest rival! After a number of non-finishes, the pairing took third place at Jarama in Spain, and Facetti lost the lead in the title race to Dieter Quester. The final round of 1977 was held at Estoril, dominated by the changeable weather. As an early leader, Grano (now racing for Alpina BMW) faltered, Facetti took his CSL past in the final few minutes of the four-hour race, and scored another win for himself and his partner, Finotto. Grano's second place with his partner, Quester, secured the Austrian the championship by just six points ahead of Facetti, with Finotto taking fifth place overall.

In 1978, Finotto had brought the Alpina BMW CSL, and continued to share with Facetti. The first round of the 1978 European Touring Car Championship saw the car arrive at Brands Hatch, although two of the four BMWs entered had used the supply of engines in qualifying and therefore did not start. The other remaining BMW was quicker in the hands of Grano and Tom Walkinshaw, but due to a poor pit stop by the BMW Italia crew, Facetti/Finotto were able leading until three laps from the end, when Walkinshaw took over the lead. Fresh from their second place in England, Facetti/Finotto were only challenged by their tyres in the four-hour event at Monza, eventually winning by seven laps.

In the Mugello race, Facetti and John Fitzpatrick diced the lead in the early stages of the race, only for the Englishman to drop away when his gearlever came loose. Facetti continued in the lead until Fitzpatrick retook it during a tyre stop. Soon afterwards, the car began to overheat with Finotto at the controls and would eventually record a DNF. Facetti/Finotto soon returned to their winning ways when they took victory in the Austria-Trophäe.

After coming fifth at Jarama, Finotto suffered more bad luck in Estoril with a slipping clutch. As a result, saw Facetti/Finotto lose the championship lead. They retire with fuel feed problems on the Österreichring. But, returned to winning way when the series visited Czechoslovakia, when they trashed the opposition, finishing over an 11 km lap ahead of series leader, Grano. When the pair suffered an engine failure on the Nürburgring, they left the series only to return again in 1979.

After taking pole position for the 1979 6 Ore di Mugello in the 935, Facetti led the race until a collision, and he wound up in third at the end. After this WCM outing, Finotto returned to ETCC at Vallelunga. After 300 of the 500 km, Facetti/Finotto were amongst the leading BMWs, when Finotto pitted with a boiling radiator; only moments later, Eddy Joosen pitted with exactly the same problem. Repairs were made, and both BMWs were back at full pace. At the end of 500 km, Facetti/Finotto were only 9 seconds behind the winners Bruno Giacomelli/Grano/Joosen. The next ETCC race at Mugello was once again a battle between the BMWs. Although the result was the same as before, the margin of victory was down in just 2.6 seconds.

Facetti/Finotto had a dramatic time at Brands Hatch, when they lost the lead of the 500 km race. They were comfortably ahead of the field for 100 of the 120 laps, when the gear level broke in their old BMW CSL. After quick repairs, Facetti set off desperately to regain ground lost to the rival Luigi BMW. Just a few laps, he had a patch of oil and shot into the catch fencing surrounding the track. Another retirement at the next race, Jarama, this time due fuel feed problems. Their third DNF in a row was down the issues with the cooling system at Österreichring.

Main rival for the 1979 title was Grano (Luigi BMW), and while he and Facetti/Finotto both suffered from blown head gaskets at Brno, the green Jolly Club BMW could salvage the car to second place at the end of the race. The trip to the Nürburgring saw the pair win a race for the first time that season, after they taken pole position. Next on the ETCC agenda was Zandvoort, which saw the Jolly Club pairing head another BMW 1-2 finish. The BMW dominated the race at Salzburgring, taking all the steps of the podium, with Facetti/Finotto on the number one step, completing a hat-trick of victories.

When the ETCC visited Enna, once again it was a BMW festival, with a podium clean sweep, and after a spin by Finotto, the order was decided with the Jolly Club car in second. They went one better at Silverstone, by winning the RAC Tourist Trophy, with it the European Touring Car title. Their winning ways continued at Zolder, the pair's fifth victory in the last six races.

=== World of Sportscars ===
By 1980, Facetti was in charge at Achille Motors in Milan. This was a business venture with long-time racing partner Finotto. And that year, Lancia sold Finotto one of their brand new Lancia Beta Montecarlo Turbo, the factory had been running in the World Championship Group 5, together with Facetti and Finotto were able to add points to the marque's total. In 1981, they came up with the idea of trying the challenge Porsche with a Ferrari.

With Maranello only interested in Formula One, Facetti and Finotto decided to take on the all-conquering Porsche 935s, even though their facilities at Archille Motors were hardly equal to Porsche's. They chose the 3.0-litre Ferrari 308 GTB as their base model. As Group 5 was a Silhouette formula, Facetti knew he could change a lot of things, provided the car looked like the standard road version. This car they called Carma FF (CARlo and MArtino, the FF for Facetti and Finotto).

The standard 308 GTB was not in the same league as a 935, so Facetti designed his own cylinder heads and added two turbochargers, and ended up with 700 bhp. He also threw away the front and rear subframes and went to Giorgio Stirano, who ran Alba Engineering, to build lighter subframes that were merged with the Ferrari centre tub. When the car arrived at 24 Hours of Daytona, the car looked like a real Italian special. In conversation, Facetti believed he would be able to turn up the boost in qualifying and get 840 bhp. This he did, always the brave and gritty driver, putting the Ferrari sixth on the grid.

However, Finotto also decided to ship the well-used Lancia Beta Turbo, as they intended to race both cars over the 24 hours, and gave a young Emanuele Pirro his first-ever major sports outing. It was not necessary, for Facetti drove the Carma flat out, setting the fastest lap in the race, before pitting after only five laps to retire with a cracked manifold and failed electrics. When the car next appeared at Mugello, they were in sixth place when the electric failed again. While at Monza, Facetti put the Carma FF on pole, only for the fuel pump pack up on the warm-up lap and they were out. A gearbox failure accounted for their DNF at Silverstone.

Only Facetti could wring a performance out of the car that Finotto could not, yet both drivers would fear a trip to the Nürburgring. To no surprise, when Facetti completely lost it and crashed on the Nordschleife. The car appeared twice more. It was on pole at Enna, only to retire after three laps. Finally, to the Kyalami Nine Hour race, it once again expired after being second fastest in practice.

For 1982, Facetti and Finotto decided against returning with the Carma and its twin-turbo 308 experiment, instead opting for more conventional Osella-BMW PA9, but equally unsuccessful as they failed to finish a race in the car that season.

1983 saw the introduction of a new category into World Sportscars, Group C Junior. As Facetti and Finotto knew they could not compete on level terms with the might of Porsche, Finotto commissioned Stirano to build a car to these new regulations, while Facetti designed and built a 1.8 litre, four-cylinder turbocharged engine. Since power units had to be ascribed to a recognised manufacturer, the team became known as Giannini-Alba, then Carma FF from 1985. The first car, Alba AR2, was a regular class winner with Facetti and Finotto at the helm in 1983, helping Alba to win the Group C Junior Cup. By 1984, this pairing was winless but still assisted Alba to win the Group C2 Prototype FIA Cup.

The Alba AR6 continued to use Facetti's engine for the 1985 season, but the team lost reliability with it, trying to keep up with pace-setter Gordon Spice, Finotto turned his attention to the IMSA Camel Lights category in America for 1986. Finotto and Facetti, who prepared the overhead camshaft Ferrari engines, joined forces with Gaston Andrey Racing and enrolled fellow Italian, Ruggero Melgrati, who proved to be a pace-setter in the Lights division.

=== The IMSA Camel Lights years ===
Finotto had a competitive season in 1986, taking a class fifth place in the Coca-Cola 600 at Charlotte and a class win in The Löwenbräu Classic, at Road America. He had a short season in 1987, earning 22 points for a class fourth place at Watkins Glen and third on the Ohio Street Circuit, Columbus, but started the 1988 season very well, in the Alba AR6 adapted for the Ferrari engine. Finotto partnered by Guido Daccò and Pieter Silva were seventh in class at the Daytona 24, then Finotto/Melgrati won on the Miami Grand Prix Street Circuit and again at Road Atlanta. He would finish the season sixth overall.

For 1989, he switched to Bieri Racing to race their Ferrari-powered Spice and continued with them in 1990. It was here that he would score three class wins with Melgrati at Lime Rock, Watkins Glen and Road America, to help him secure second place in the IMSA Camel Lights series. After a short season in 1991 and one visit to the class podium, he would return to the cockpit of Ferrari 308 GTB for one last outing, at the 1995 12 Hours of Sebring.

=== Death ===
Finotto, who died at the age of 80 after a long battle with cancer, made his mark in Motor Sport as a driver, a team owner and engine constructor.

Almo Coppelli, who drove for Finotto during the Carma Alba in Group C2, and then subsequently partnered with him in IMSA Camel Lights, was described as a man who was at once passionate for motorsport and a hard taskmaster. "Finotto as driven by his passion, but he always have me a hard time. He and Facetti were old-school guys and really tough with me, but I learned a lot – racing with them was part of my schooling. Facetti did everything in the team: he was the driver, the manager and the engineer. Finotto paid the bills, but he was decent driver who was never far off the pace"

== Racing record ==
=== Career highlights ===
Season	Series	Position	Team	Car
1972	Campionato Italiano di Turismo	8th	Jolly Club	Ford Escort RS 1600
	Coppa CASI di classe 2000cc	1st	Jolly Club	Ford Escort RS 1600
1973	Campionato Italiano di Turismo	7th	Jolly Club	Ford Escort RS 1600
	Coppa CASI di classe 2000cc	1st	Jolly Club	Ford Escort RS 1600
1974	European Touring Car Championship	7th	Jolly Club	BMW 3.0 CSL
1975	European Touring Car Championship	3rd	Castrol Team Zakspeed; Jolly Club	Ford Escort RS 1600
1976	European Touring Car Championship	17th	Luigi Racing	BMW 3.0 CSL
1977	Coppa Intereuropa	1st		Porsche 935
1977	European Touring Car Championship	5th	Luigi Racing	BMW 3.0 CSL
1978	European Touring Car Championship	4th	Jolly Club	BMW 3.0 CSL
1979	European Touring Car Championship	1st	Jolly Club	BMW 3.0 CSL
1980	World Challenge for Endurance Drivers	33rd	Jolly Club	Lancia Beta Montecarlo Turbo
1981	World Endurance Championship of Drivers	87th	Jolly Club; Carma FF	Lancia Beta Montecarlo Turbo; Ferrari 308 GTB
1983	European Endurance Championship	44th	Jolly Club	Alba-Giannini AR2
	World Endurance Championship of Drivers	63rd	Jolly Club	Osella-Giannini PA9; Alba-Giannini AR2
1984	World Endurance Championship of Drivers	53rd	Jolly Club	Alba-Giannini AR2
1985	FIA World Endurance Championship	42nd	Carma FF	Alba-Carma AR2; Alba-Carma AR6
1986	IMSA Camel GTP Lights Championship	39th	Carma FF; Gaston Andrey Racing	Alba-Ferrari AR6
1987	IMSA Camel GTP Lights Championship	24th	Gaston Andrey Racing	Alba-Ferrari AR6
1988	IMSA Camel GTP Lights Championship	6th	Gaston Andrey Racing	Alba-Ferrari AR6; Tiga-Ferrari GT286
1989	IMSA Camel GTP Lights Championship	11th	Bieri Racing	Tiga-Ferrari GT286; Spice-Ferrari SE89P
1990	IMSA Camel GTP Lights Championship	2nd	Bieri Racing	Spice-Ferrari SE88P; Spice-Ferrari SE90P; Alba-Ferrari AR6
1991	IMSA Camel GTP Lights Championship	12th	Bieri Racing	Spice-Ferrari SE89P; Spice-Ferrari SE90P

=== Complete 24 Hours of Le Mans results ===
Year	Team	Co-Drivers	Car	Class	Laps	Pos.	Class Pos.
1974	(Italy) BMW Jolly Club	(West Germany) Manfred Mohr (Italy) Carlo Facetti	BMW 3.0 CSL	T	155	DNF	DNF
1980	(Italy) Jolly Club – Lancia Corse	(Italy) Carlo Facetti	Lancia Beta Montecarlo Turbo	Gr.5	273	19th	2nd
1981	(Italy) Jolly Club	(Italy) Giorgio Schön (Italy) Giorgio Pianta	Lancia Beta Montecarlo Turbo	Gr.5	293	14th	4th
1983	(Italy) Scuderia Jolly Club	(Italy) Carlo Facetti (Switzerland) Marco Vanoli	Alba-Giannini AR2	C Junior	158	DNF	DNF
1984	(Italy) Jolly Club	(Italy) Carlo Facetti (Switzerland) Marco Vanoli	Alba-Giannini AR2	C2	258	21st	7th
1985	(Italy) Carma F.F.	(Italy) Guido Daccò (Italy) Aldo Bertuzzi	Alba-Giannini AR2	C2	228	DNF	DNF

=== Complete 24 Hours of Daytona results ===
Year	Team	Co-Drivers	Car	Class	Laps	Pos.	Class Pos.
1977	(Italy) Jolly Club	(Italy) Carlo Facetti (Switzerland) Romeo Camathias	Porsche 935	Gr.5	679	2nd	1st
1978	(Italy) Jolly Club	(Italy) Carlo Facetti	Porsche 935	GTX	6	DNF	DNF
1979	(Italy) Jolly Club – Sportswagen Racing Team	(Italy) Carlo Facetti (Italy) Giampiero Moretti	Porsche 935	GTX	164	DNF	DNF
1980	(Italy) Jolly Club	(Italy) Carlo Facetti	Lancia Beta Montecarlo Turbo	GTX	597	10th	6th
1981	(Italy) Jolly Club	(Italy) Carlo Facetti	Ferrari 308 GTB Turbo	GTX	4	DNF	DNF
1981	(Italy) Jolly Club Italia	(Italy) Carlo Facetti (Italy) Emanuele Pirro	Lancia Beta Montecarlo Turbo	GTX	609	5th	3rd
1986	(Italy) Carma Racing	(Italy) Ruggero Melgrati (Italy) Almo Coppelli	Alba-Ferrari AR6	Lights	291	DNF	DNF
1988	(United States) Gaston Andrey Racing	(Italy) Pietro Silva (Italy) Guido Daccò	Alba-Ferrari AR6	Lights	506	27th	7th
1989	(Canada) Bieri Racing	(Italy) Paolo Guatamacchi (Canada) Uli Bieri	Tiga-Ferrari GT286	Lights	475	22nd	2nd
1990	(Canada) Bieri Racing	(Italy) Paolo Guatamacchi (Switzerland) Loris Kessel	Spice-Ferrari SE89P	Lights	306	DNF	DNF

=== Complete 12 Hours of Sebring results ===
Year	Team	Co-Drivers	Car	Class	Laps	Pos.	Class Pos.
1986	(United States) Gaston Andrey Racing	(Italy) Carlo Facetti (Italy) Ruggero Melgarti	Alba-Ferrari AR6	Lights	41	DNF	DNF
1987	(United States) Gaston Andrey Racing	(Italy) Ruggero Melgarti (Italy) Pietro Silva	Alba-Ferrari AR6	Lights	177	DNF	DNF
1988	(United States) Gaston Andrey Racing	(Canada) Uli Bieri (Switzerland) Angelo Pallavicini (Italy) Paolo Guatamcchi	Alba-Ferrari AR6	Lights	269	13th	2nd
1988	(United States) Gaston Andrey Racing	(Italy) Ruggero Melgarti (Italy) Guido Daccò	Tiga-Ferrari GT286	Lights	264	18th	4th
1989	(Canada) Bieri Racing	(Italy) Paolo Guatamacchi (Canada) Uli Bieri	Tiga-Ferrari GT286	Lights	193	DNF	DNF
1990	(Canada) Bieri Racing	(Italy) Ruggero Melgrati (Italy) Paolo Guatamacchi	Spice-Ferrari SE89P	Lights	261	12th	3rd
1991	(Canada) Bieri Racing	(Italy) Ruggero Melgrati (Spain) Fermín Vélez	Spice-Ferrari SE89P	Lights	147	DNF	DNF
1995	(Italy) Martion Finotto	(Italy) Ruggero Melgrati (United States) John Finger	Ferrari 308 GTB	GTS-2	74	DNF	DNF

=== Complete 24 Hours of Spa results ===
Year	Team	Co-Drivers	Car	Class	Laps	Pos.	Class Pos.
1976	(Italy) Luigi Racing	(Belgium) Jean Xhenceval (Belgium) Pierre Dieudonné	BMW 3.0 CSL	Div.4		DNF	DNF
1978	(Italy) Luigi Racing Lotto	(Belgium) Jean Xhenceval (Belgium) André Gavage	BMW 530i	Grp.1+2.5		DNF	DNF
1981	(Belgium) Van Hove Mobil Smit Jet	(Belgium) Raijmond van Hove (Belgium) Georges Cremer	Chevrolet Camaro Z28	serT+2.5	393	22nd	14th

Sporting positions
Preceded by Umberto Grano	European Touring Car Championship champion 1979, with Carlo Facetti	Succeeded by Helmut Kelleners and Siegfried Müller Jr.
