= Triple Crown of endurance racing =

Motorsport achievement

In automobile endurance racing, three events have come to form a Triple Crown. They are considered three of the most challenging endurance races over the decades: the 24 Hours of Daytona, 12 Hours of Sebring, and 24 Hours of Le Mans. As of 2025, only 10 drivers have completed this Triple Crown by winning all three races. Hans Herrmann was the first to do so with Porsche from 1960 to 1970, and Nick Tandy is the most recent to do so in 2025. No driver has won all three events in the same year.

== History ==
Automobile endurance racing with sportscars started with the Targa Florio (1906-1977) lapping the island of Sicily, and in 1923, the 24 Hours of Le Mans introduced the classic time limit on a closed circuit. The Mille Miglia lapped northern Italy, and the Carrera Panamericana crossed Mexico, but these large scale events were discontinued in the 1950s.

Some circuits like Nürburgring, Spa-Francorchamps and Monza held Grands Prix, 1000km races, and also 24 Hours races, but not continuously over decades. In the 1960s, when Ford challenged and beat Ferrari at Le Mans, two events in Florida established themselves as part of the World Championship: the 12 Hours of Sebring on a bumpy airfield, and the 24 Hours of Daytona partially run on the infield and on the banking of the oval track. Both events take place early in the year, with a larger share of darkness than in other events, and both are indicators of the performance of new cars. Even though the rules were often different between the races, sportcars and GTs of the same teams could enter the most challenging endurance races on different continents. The media began to talk about an informal Triple Crown of endurance racing, in regard to the drivers, even though two or three share a drive: Daytona and Sebring that start the endurance season, and Le Mans as the undisputed sportscar highlight.

Ken Miles lost the chance to win all three events in the same year when Ford team orders for a photo finish made him lose the 1966 24 Hours of Le Mans. This incident was dramatized in the 2019 film Ford v Ferrari. Miles died two months later testing the Ford J-car. In 2025, Laurens Vanthoor had similar results; he won at Daytona and Sebring in a Porsche 963 LMDh that won both kind of championships twice, IMSA and WEC, but finished second in the 2025 24 Hours of Le Mans to the Ferrari 499P that was made as WEC-only LMH to win Le Mans, which it did three times in a row, with only one WEC championship on top.

Hurley Haywood and Al Holbert have won all three races at least twice.

Numerous drivers have won, or entered, only two out of the three events that makes up this informal triple crown of endurance racing. Tom Kristensen won Le Mans 9 times and Sebring six times, making him the most successful driver at both events, but he was active in an era when American sportscar racing was split between two different sanctioning bodies. Daytona at the time was sanctioned by Grand-Am Road Racing, whose prototype cars were markedly different than the ACO LMP1 cars Kristensen drove; the American Le Mans Series sanctioned Sebring and used the ACO's regulations. Thus "Mr. Le Mans" would only visit Daytona as a spectator and brand ambassador for race sponsor Rolex; while the two series would eventually merge as the modern IMSA series in 2014, the new series would not have an LMP1 class and Kristensen retired following that season.

== List of Triple Crown winners ==
Bold on year indicate at which race the driver achieved his Triple Crown.

Driver	Year completed	24 Hours of Daytona	12 Hours of Sebring	24 Hours of Le Mans	Total wins
(United States) Phil Hill	1964	1964*	1958, 1959, 1961	1958, 1961, 1962	7
(United States) Dan Gurney	1967	1962**	1959	1967	3
(West Germany) Hans Herrmann	1970	1968	1960, 1968	1970	4
(United Kingdom) Jackie Oliver	1971	1971	1969	1969	3
(Belgium) Jacky Ickx	1972	1972***	1969, 1972	1969, 1975, 1976, 1977, 1981, 1982	9
(United States) Hurley Haywood	1977	1973, 1975, 1977, 1979, 1991	1973, 1981	1977, 1983, 1994	10
(United States) A. J. Foyt	1985	1983, 1985	1985	1967	4
(United States) Al Holbert	1986	1986, 1987	1976, 1981	1983, 1986, 1987	7
(United Kingdom) Andy Wallace	1992	1990, 1997, 1999	1992, 1993	1988	6
(Italy) Mauro Baldi	1998	1998, 2002	1998	1994	4
(Germany) Marco Werner	2005	1995	2003, 2005, 2007	2005, 2006, 2007	7
(Germany) Timo Bernhard	2010	2003	2008	2010, 2017	4
(United Kingdom) Nick Tandy	2025	2025	2025	2015	3

(*) Held as the 2000 km of Daytona. (**) Held as the Daytona 3 Hours. (***) Held as the 6 Hours of Daytona.

== Big Six ==
The "Big Six" is an expansion of the endurance racing Triple Crown that adds Petit Le Mans, the Nürburgring 24 Hours and the Spa 24 Hours. The Big Six races are considered to be the six most prestigious endurance races in the world. The 10-hour Petit Le Mans is the only other major endurance race besides Le Mans, Daytona and Sebring to feature elite endurance teams including prototype classes, while Nürburgring and Spa are the only other major 24-hour races besides Le Mans and Daytona.

In 2025, Nick Tandy became the first driver to win the Big Six endurance races overall after winning the 2025 12 Hours of Sebring.

== See also ==
- Petit Le Mans
- Nürburgring 24 Hours
- Spa 24 Hours
- Bathurst 12 Hour
