= 1985 IMSA GT Championship =

15th season of the racing series organized by IMSA

Seasons
- ← 1984 1986 →

The 1985 Camel GT Championship season was the 15th season of the IMSA GT Championship auto racing series. It was for prototypes in the existing GTP class and new, smaller Lights class, as well as Grand Tourer-style racing cars which ran in the GTO and GTU classes. It began on February 2, 1985, and ended on December 1, 1985, after seventeen rounds.

== Schedule ==
The GT and Prototype classes did not participate in all events, nor did they race together at shorter events. Races marked as GT featured both GTO and GTU classes combined. Races marked with All had all classes on track at the same time.

Rnd	Race	Length	Class	Circuit	Date
1	SunBank 24 at Daytona	24 Hours	All	Daytona International Speedway	February 2 February 3
2	Löwenbräu Grand Prix of Miami	3 Hours	Proto	Streets of Miami	February 24
2	Löwenbräu Grand Prix of Miami	45 Minutes	GTO	Streets of Miami	February 24
2	Löwenbräu Grand Prix of Miami	45 Minutes	GTU	Streets of Miami	February 24
3	Coca-Cola Classic 12 Hours of Sebring	12 Hours	All	Sebring International Raceway	March 23
4	Atlanta Journal-Constitution Grand Prix	500 km	All	Road Atlanta	April 14
5	Los Angeles Times/Nissan Grand Prix	600 km	All	Riverside International Raceway	April 28
6	Nissan Monterey Triple Crown	300 km	Proto	Laguna Seca Raceway	May 5
6	Nissan Monterey Triple Crown	100 km	GT	Laguna Seca Raceway	May 5
7	Grand Prix of Charlotte	300 km	GT	Charlotte Motor Speedway	May 18
7	Grand Prix of Charlotte	500 km	Proto	Charlotte Motor Speedway	May 19
8	Coca-Cola 500	2 Hours	GT	Lime Rock Park	May 27
8	Coca-Cola 500	2 Hours	Proto	Lime Rock Park	May 27
9	Lumbermen's 500k	300 km	GT	Mid-Ohio Sports Car Course	June 8
9	Lumbermen's 500k	500 km	Proto	Mid-Ohio Sports Car Course	June 9
10	Camel Continental	3 Hours	GT	Watkins Glen International	July 6
10	Camel Continental	3 Hours	Proto	Watkins Glen International	July 6
11	G.I. Joe's Grand Prix	200 km	GT	Portland International Raceway	July 28
11	G.I. Joe's Grand Prix	300 km	Proto	Portland International Raceway	July 28
12	Ford California Grand Prix	300 km	Proto	Sears Point Raceway	August 4
12	Ford California Grand Prix	100 km	GT	Sears Point Raceway	August 4
13	Löwenbräu Classic	500 Miles	All	Road America	August 25
14	Grand Prix at Pocono	500 km	All	Pocono Raceway	September 8
15	Serengeti Drivers New York 500	500 km	All	Watkins Glen International	September 29
16	Columbus Ford Dealers 500	1 Hour	GT	Columbus Street Circuit	October 5
16	Columbus Ford Dealers 500	500 km	Proto	Columbus Street Circuit	October 6
17	Eastern 3 Hours of Daytona	3 Hours	All	Daytona International Speedway	December 1

== Season results ==
Rnd	Circuit	GTP Winning Team	Lights Winning Team	GTO Winning Team	GTU Winning Team	Results
Rnd	Circuit	GTP Winning Drivers	Lights Winning Drivers	GTO Winning Drivers	GTU Winning Drivers	Results
1	Daytona	(United States) #8 Henn's Swap Shop	(United States) #93 Mid-O Racing	(United States) #65 Roush Protofab	(United States) #71 Team Highball	Results
1	Daytona	(United States) A. J. Foyt (United States) Al Unser (France) Bob Wollek (Belgium) Thierry Boutsen	(United States) Don Marsh (United States) Kelly Marsh (United States) Ron Pawley	(United States) Wally Dallenbach Jr. (United States) Doc Bundy (Canada) John Jones	(United States) Jack Dunham (United States) Amos Johnson (Japan) Yojiro Terada	Results
2	Miami	(United States) #14 Holbert Racing	(United States) #63 RGP 500 Racing	(United States) #06 Roush Protofab	(United States) #76 Malibu Grand Prix	Results
2	Miami	(United States) Al Holbert (United Kingdom) Derek Bell	(United States) Jim Downing (United States) John Maffuci	(United States) Willy T. Ribbs	(United States) Jack Baldwin	Results
3	Sebring	(United States) #8 Preston Henn	(United States) #63 Jim Downing	(United States) #65 Roush Protofab	(United States) #56 SP Racing	Results
3	Sebring	(United States) A. J. Foyt (France) Bob Wollek	(United States) Jim Downing (United States) John Maffuci	(United States) Wally Dallenbach Jr. (Canada) John Jones	(United States) Gary Auberlen (United States) Peter Jauker (United States) Adrian Gang (United States) Cary Eisenlohr	Results
4	Road Atlanta	(United States) #04 Group 44	(United States) #72 Fabcar	(United States) #65 Roush Protofab	(United States) #76 Malibu Grand Prix	Results
4	Road Atlanta	(United States) Hurley Haywood (United Kingdom) Brian Redman	(United States) Elliot Forbes-Robinson (United States) Tom Winters	(United States) Wally Dallenbach Jr. (Canada) John Jones	(United States) Jack Baldwin	Results
5	Riverside	(United States) #68 BF Goodrich	(United States) #63 RGP 500 Racing	(United States) #65 Roush Protofab	(United States) #76 Malibu Grand Prix	Results
5	Riverside	(United States) Pete Halsmer (United States) John Morton	(United States) Jim Downing (United States) John Maffucci	(United States) Wally Dallenbach Jr. (Canada) John Jones	(United States) Jack Baldwin (United States) Jeff Kline	Results
6	Laguna Seca	(United States) #14 Holbert Racing	(United States) #6 Charles Morgan	(United States) #98 All American Racers	(United States) #55 Huffaker Racing	Results
6	Laguna Seca	(United States) Al Holbert	(United States) Bill Alsup	(United States) Dennis Aase	(United States) Bob Earl	Results
7	Charlotte	(United States) #14 Holbert Racing	(United States) #63 RGP 500 Racing	(United States) #53 Danny Smith	(United States) #55 Huffaker Racing	Results
7	Charlotte	(United States) Al Holbert (United Kingdom) Derek Bell	(United States) Jim Downing (United States) John Maffuci	(United States) Danny Smith	(United States) Bob Earl	Results
8	Lime Rock	(United States) #16 Dyson Racing	(United States) #9 Essex Racing	(United States) #7 Brooks Racing	(United States) #99 All American Racers	Results
8	Lime Rock	(United States) Drake Olson	(United States) Peter Greenfield (United States) Michael Greenfield	(United States) Darin Brassfield	(United States) Chris Cord	Results
9	Mid-Ohio	(United States) #14 Holbert Racing	(United States) #75 Malibu Grand Prix	(United States) #65 Roush Protofab	(United States) #84 Entech Racing	Results
9	Mid-Ohio	(United States) Al Holbert (United Kingdom) Derek Bell	(United States) Jack Baldwin (United States) Jeff Kline	(United States) Wally Dallenbach Jr. (Canada) John Jones	(United States) Clay Young	Results
10	Watkins Glen	(United States) #14 Holbert Racing	(United States) #6 Charles Morgan	(United States) #7 Brooks Racing	(United States) #55 Huffaker Racing	Results
10	Watkins Glen	(United States) Al Holbert (United Kingdom) Derek Bell	(United States) Charles Morgan (United States) Bill Alsup	(United States) Darin Brassfield (Germany) Klaus Ludwig	(United States) Bob Earl	Results
11	Portland	(United States) #14 Holbert Racing	(United States) #63 RGP 500 Racing	(United States) #7 Brooks Racing	(United States) #55 Huffaker Racing	Results
11	Portland	(United States) Al Holbert	(United States) Jim Downing	(United States) Darin Brassfield	(United States) Bob Earl	Results
12	Sears Point	(United States) #86 Bayside Disposal	(United States) #75 Malibu Grand Prix	(United States) #7 Brooks Racing	(United States) #55 Huffaker Racing	Results
12	Sears Point	(France) Bob Wollek	(United States) Jeff Kline	(United States) Darin Brassfield	(United States) Bob Earl	Results
13	Road America	(United States) #16 Dyson Racing	(United States) #93 Mid-O Racing	(United States) #65 Roush Protofab	(United States) #76 Malibu Grand Prix	Results
13	Road America	(United States) Bobby Rahal (United States) Drake Olson	(United States) Don Marsh (United States) Kelly Marsh (United States) Ron Pawley	(United States) Lyn St. James (Canada) John Jones	(United States) Jack Baldwin (United States) Jeff Kline	Results
14	Pocono	(United States) #14 Holbert Racing	(United States) #9 Essex Racing	(United States) #77 Brooks Racing	(United States) #99 All American Racers	Results
14	Pocono	(United States) Al Holbert (United Kingdom) Derek Bell	(United States) Scott Schubot (United States) Dennis Vitolo	(United States) Darin Brassfield (United States) Scott Pruett	(United States) Chris Cord (United States) Dennis Aase	Results
15	Watkins Glen	(United States) #14 Holbert Racing	(United States) #63 RGP 500 Racing	(United States) #07 Roush Racing	(United States) #76 Malibu Grand Prix	Results
15	Watkins Glen	(United States) Al Holbert (United Kingdom) Derek Bell	(United States) Jim Downing (United States) John Maffuci	(United States) Lyn St. James	(United States) Jack Baldwin	Results
16	Columbus	(United States) #16 Dyson Racing	(United States) #63 RGP 500 Racing	(United States) #5 Dingman Bros.	(United States) #55 Huffaker Racing	Results
16	Columbus	(United States) Price Cobb (United States) Drake Olson	(United States) Jim Downing (United States) John Maffuci	(New Zealand) Steve Millen	(United States) Bob Earl	Results
17	Daytona	(United States) #14 Holbert Racing	(United States) #63 Jim Downing	(United States) #65 Roush Protofab	(United States) #99 All American Racers	Results
17	Daytona	(United States) Al Holbert (United States) Al Unser Jr.	(United States) Jim Downing (United States) John Maffuci	(United States) Lyn St. James (Canada) John Jones	(United States) Chris Cord	Results
