= 1986 24 Hours of Daytona =

Previous: 1985	Next: 1987
Index: Races | Winners

Track map of Daytona International Speedway

The 24th SunBank 24 at Daytona was a 24-hour endurance sports car race held on February 1–2, 1986 at the Daytona International Speedway road course. The race served as the opening round of the 1986 IMSA GT Championship.

Victory overall and in the GTP class went to the No. 14 Holbert Racing Porsche 962 driven by Al Holbert, Derek Bell, and Al Unser Jr. Victory in the GTO Class went to the No. 64 Raintree Corporation Ford Mustang driven by Lee Mueller, Maurice Hassey, and Lanny Hester. Victory in the Lights class went to the No. 13 Outlaw Racing Argo JM19 driven by Frank Rubino, Ray Mummery, and John Schneider. Victory in the GTU class went to the No. 71 Team Highball Mazda RX-7 driven by Amos Johnson, Dennis Shaw, and Jack Dunham.

== Race results ==
Class winners in bold.

Pos	Class	No	Team	Drivers	Car	Laps
1	**GTP**	**14**	(United States) **Holbert Racing**	(United States) **Al Holbert** (United Kingdom) **Derek Bell** (United States) **Al Unser Jr.**	**Porsche 962**	**712**
2	GTP	8	(United States) Henn's Swap Shop Racing	(United States) A. J. Foyt (Netherlands) Arie Luyendyk (United States) Danny Sullivan (United States) Preston Henn	Porsche 962	712
3	GTP	67	(United States) BFGoodrich	(United Kingdom) Derek Warwick (United States) Darin Brassfield (United States) Jim Busby (Germany) Jochen Mass	Porsche 962	711
4	**GTO**	**64**	(United States) **Raintree Corporation**	(United States) **Lee Mueller** (United States) **Maurice Hassey** (United States) **Lanny Hester**	**Ford Mustang**	**622**
5	GTO	07	(United States) 7-Eleven/Roush Racing	(United States) Scott Pruett (Germany) Klaus Ludwig (United States) Bruce Jenner	Ford Mustang	614
6	GTP	44	(United States) Group 44	(United States) Bob Tullius (France) Claude Ballot-Léna (United States) Chip Robinson	Jaguar XJR-7	607
7	**Lights**	**13**	(United States) **Outlaw Racing**	(United States) **Frank Rubino** (United States) **Ray Mummery** (United States) **John Schneider**	**Argo JM19**	**600**
8	**GTU**	**71**	(United States) **Team Highball**	(United States) **Amos Johnson** (United States) **Dennis Shaw** (United States) **Jack Dunham**	**Mazda RX-7**	**597**
9	Lights	35	(United States) Xtra Super Food CNT	(Puerto Rico) Mandy Gonzalez (Venezuela) Ernesto Soto (Puerto Rico) Basilio Davila (Colombia) Diego Montoya	Royale RP40	579
10 DNF	GTU	75	(United States) CCR	(United States) Bob Reed (United States) Tommy Kendall (United States) John Hogdal	Mazda RX-7	563
11	GTU	32	(United States) Alderman Nissan	(United States) Bob Leitzinger (United States) Mike Carder (United States) Louis Baldwin (United States) Steve Alexander	Nissan 280ZX	537
12 DNF	GTP	68	(United States) BFGoodrich	(Netherlands) Jan Lammers (United States) John Morton (United Kingdom) Derek Warwick	Porsche 962	512
13	GTO	34	(Dominican Republic) Latino Racing	(Costa Rica) Kikos Fonseca (Dominican Republic) Luis Mendez (El Salvador) "Jamsal"	Porsche 934	512
14	Lights	27	(United States) MSB Racing	(United States) Dave Cowart (United States) Kenper Miller (United States) Jim Fowells	Argo JM19	511
15 DNF	GTO	76	(United States) Walker Racing	(United States) Nort Northam (United States) Greg Walker (United States) Craig Rubright	Chevrolet Corvette	506
16	GTO	98	(United States) All American Racers	(United States) Dennis Aase (United States) Chris Cord	Toyota Celica Turbo	489
17 DNF	Lights	93	(United States) Mid O/Rusty Jones	(United States) Ron Pawley (United States) Don Marsh (United States) Kelly Marsh	Argo JM16	482
18	GTU	17	(United States) Al Bacon Racing	(United States) Al Bacon (United States) Bill Scott (United States) Dennis Krueger	Mazda RX-7	482
19 DNF	Lights	66	(United States) STS-Mike Meyer Racing	(United States) Jim Rothbarth (United States) Jeff Kline (United States) Mike Meyer	Mazda RX-7	477
20	GTO	55	(United States) Dave Heinz Imports	(United States) Dave Heinz (United States) Steve Zwiren (United States) Don Yenko (United States) Jerry Thompson	Chevrolet Corvette	472
21 DNF	GTU	02	(United States) Roy Newsome Racing	(Canada) Richard Stevens (United States) Luis Sereix (United States) Roy Newsome (United States) Dale Kreider	Mazda RX-7	453
22	GTO	47	(United States) Dingman Bros. Racing	(New Zealand) Steve Millen (United States) Elliott Forbes-Robinson (United States) Tommy Riggins	Pontiac Firebird	438
23 DNF	GTO	72	(United States) Whitehall Rocketsports	(United States) Bob Bergstrom (United States) Gene Felton (United States) Paul Gentilozzi	Oldsmobile Toronado	434
24 DNF	GTP	04	(United States) Group 44	(Australia) Vern Schuppan (United Kingdom) Brian Redman (United States) Hurley Haywood	Jaguar XJR-7	430
25 DNF	Lights	01	(United States) AT&T Spice Engineering	(United States) Don Bell (United States) Terry Wolters (United States) Craig Carter	Royale RP40	406
26 DNF	GTP	00	(United States) Hotchkis Racing, Inc.	(United States) Jim Adams (Greece) Costas Los (United States) John Hotchkis	March 83G	402
27 DNF	GTO	62	(United States) Roush Racing	(United States) Tim Coconis (Dominican Republic) Fernando Robles (Dominican Republic) Chris Marte	Ford Mustang	368
28 DNF	GTO	88	(United States) Morrison Cook Motorsport	(United States) Jack Baldwin (United States) Bob McConnell (United States) Tommy Morrison (United States) Don Knowles	Chevrolet Corvette	365
29	GTP	82	(United States) K&P Racing	(United States) William Wessel (United States) Mark Kennedy (United States) David Fuller (United States) Karl Keck	Chevrolet Corvette	340
30 DNF	GTO	87	(United States) Morrison Cook Motorsport	(United States) Ron Grable (United States) Don Knowles (United States) John Heinricy (United States) Bobby Carradine	Chevrolet Corvette	331
31 DNF	GTO	29	(United States) OMR Engines	(United States) Oma Kimbrough (United States) Chris Gennone (United States) Hoyt Overbagh (Canada) Pieter Baljet	Chevrolet Camaro	328
32 DNF	GTP	16	(United States) Dyson Racing	(United States) Drake Olson (United States) Price Cobb (United States) Rob Dyson	Porsche 962	320
33 DNF	GTP	45	(United States) RC Buick Hawk/Conte	(United States) John Paul Jr. (United States) Chip Ganassi (Italy) Ivan Capelli (United States) Whitney Ganz	March 85G	310
34 DNF	GTO	83	(United States) Import Restorations	(United States) Paul Reisman (United States) Bob Hebert (United States) Tom Gaffney (United States) Richard Stone	Pontiac Firebird	296
35 DNF	Lights	80	(Italy) Carma Racing	(Italy) Martino Finotto (Italy) Ruggero Megrati (Italy) Almo Coppelli	Alba AR6	291
36 DNF	GTO	30	(United States) Skoal Bandit	(United States) Buz McCall (United States) Pancho Carter (United States) Jim Mueller (United States) Tom Sheehy	Chevrolet Camaro	285
37 DNF	Lights	6	(United States) Morgan Performance	(United States) Charles Morgan (United States) Logan Blackburn (United States) David Simpson	Tiga GT286	279
38 DNF	GTP	33	(United States) Bo-And Racing	(United States) Bard Boand (United States) Richard Anderson (United States) Mike Allen	Lola T600	266
39 DNF	GTP	99	(United Kingdom) R. B. Promotions	(United Kingdom) David Andrews (United States) Steve Phillips (United Kingdom) Duncan Bain	Tiga GC285	244
40 DNF	GTO	50	(United States) Folgers/Motorcraft	(United States) Bill Elliott (United States) Ricky Rudd (United States) Kyle Petty (United States) Ken Schrader	Ford Mustang	240
41 DNF	GTO	56	(Colombia) Ricardo Londoño	(Colombia) Diego Montoya (United States) Albert Naon Jr. (United States) Carlos Migoya	Pontiac Firebird	238
42 DNF	GTU	38	(United States) Mandeville Auto/Tech	(United States) Roger Mandeville (United States) Danny Smith (Puerto Rico) Diego Febles	Mazda RX-7	229
43 DNF	GTU	78	(United States) 901 Racing	(United States) Peter Uria (United States) Larry Figaro (United States) Jack Refenning	Porsche 911 Carrera RSR	203
44 DNF	GTO	26	(United States) Walter Johnston	(United States) Ken Bupp (United Kingdom) John Hayes-Harlow (United States) Del Russo Taylor	Pontiac Firebird	195
45 DNF	Lights	63	(United States) Certified Brakes	(United States) Jim Downing (United States) John O'Steen (United States) John Maffucci	Argo JM19	184
46 DNF	GTP	3	(Switzerland) Brun Motorsports	(Belgium) Thierry Boutsen (Argentina) Oscar Larrauri	Porsche 962	176
47 DNF	Lights	9	(United States) Rinzler Motoracing	(United States) Mike Brockman (United States) Steve Durst (United States) Deborah Gregg (United States) Jim Trueman	Tiga GT285	156
48 DNF	GTO	77	(United States) Brooks Racing	(United States) Leo Franchi (United States) Steve Gentile (United States) Rick Knoop	Ford Thunderbird	150
49 DNF	GTP	10	(United States) Leeward Racing	(United States) Jim Leeward (Canada) Bill Adam (United States) Chip Mead	March 82G	123
50 DNF	GTP	2	(United States) Leon Bros. Racing	(United States) Al Leon (United States) Jim Fitzgerald (Germany) Harald Grohs (United States) Art Leon	March 85G	117
51 DNF	GTU	54	(United States) SP Racing/Escort	(United States) Karl Durkheimer (United States) Gary Auberlen (United States) Cary Eisenlohr (United States) Peter Jauker	Porsche 911 Carrera	117
52 DNF	GTP	86	(United States) Bayside Disposal Racing	(France) Bob Wollek (Republic of Ireland) Derek Daly (United States) Bruce Leven	Porsche 962	116
53 DNF	GTP	4	(United States) Lee Racing	(United States) Lew Price (United States) Jim Mullen (United States) Matt Whetstine	Chevrolet Corvette GTP	104
54 DNF	GTU	89	(United States) Tom Hunt	(United States) Tom Hunt (United States) James Shelton (United States) Paul Romano (United States) Russ Boy	Mazda RX-7	85
55 DNF	GTP	06	(United States) Hi-Tech Racing	(Colombia) Miguel Morejon (United States) Joe Varde (United States) Tico Almeida	Porsche 935 M16	83
56 DNF	GTO	43	(United States) Global American	(United States) Steve Cohen (United States) David Christian (United States) Tom Congleton	BMW M1	68
57 DNF	GTO	90	(United States) Road Circuit Technology	(United States) Les Delano (United States) Andy Petery	Pontiac Firebird	67
58 DNF	Lights	37	(United States) Burdsall-Newsome Racing	(United States) Peter Welter (United States) Roy Newsome (United States) Tom Burdsall	Tiga GT285	66
59 DNF	GTU	36	(United States) Case Racing	(United States) Dave Panaccione (United States) Ron Case	Porsche 924 Carrera GTR	65
60 DNF	Lights	11	(United States) Kendall Racing	(United States) Paul Lewis (United States) Chuck Kendall (United States) Tommy Kendall (United States) Max Jones	Lola T616	48
61 DNF	GTO	25	(United States) Lucas Truck Service	(Canada) Robert Peters (United States) Kent Painter (United States) Tom Nehl (United States) Scott Gaylord	Chevrolet Camaro	37
62 DNF	GTP	5	(United States) Bob Akin Motor Racing	(Germany) Hans-Joachim Stuck (United States) Bob Akin (Austria) Jo Gartner	Porsche 962	29
63 DNF	GTP	46	(United States) RC Buick Hawk/Conte	(United States) Whitney Ganz (United States) Ken Madren (United States) Bob Lobenberg	March 85G	27
64 DNF	GTP	0	(Germany) Joest Racing	(Italy) Paolo Barilla (United States) Randy Lanier (Italy) Giampiero Moretti	Porsche 962	6
65 DNF	GTO	92	(United States) Van Every Racing	(United States) Ash Tisdelle (United States) Lance van Every (United States) Rusty Bond	Chevrolet Camaro	6
66 DNF	GTO	28	(United States) Texas Enterprises/US Tobacco	(United States) Terry Labonte (United States) Harry Gant (United States) Phil Parsons	Oldsmobile Calais	3
DNS	GTP	52	(United States) Hendrick Motorsports	(South Africa) Sarel van der Merwe (United States) Doc Bundy (United States) Wally Dallenbach Jr.	Chevrolet Corvette GTP	-
DNS	GTP	48	(United States) Global American	(United States) Don Walker (United States) Brian Goellnicht (Canada) Charles Monk	March 83G	-
DNS	GTO	74	(United States) Bill McDill	(United States) Bill McDill (United States) Richard McDill (United States) Tom Juckette	Chevrolet Camaro	-
DNS	GTU	57	(United States) Kryderacing	(United States) Reed Kryder (United States) Tom Palmer (United States) Fred Staffilino (United States) Rod Whelan	Nissan 280ZX	-
