= 1985 24 Hours of Daytona =

1985 24-hour endurance sports car race

Previous: 1984	Next: 1986
Index: Races | Winners

Track map of Daytona International Speedway

The 23rd Annual SunBank 24 at Daytona was a 24-hour endurance sports car race held on February 2–3, 1985 at the Daytona International Speedway road course. The race served as the opening round of the 1985 IMSA GT Championship.

Victory overall and in the GTP class went to the No. 8 Henn's Swap Shop Racing Porsche 962 driven by A. J. Foyt, Bob Wollek, Al Unser, and Thierry Boutsen. Victory in the GTO class went to the No. 65 Roush Racing Ford Mustang driven by Wally Dallenbach Jr., John Jones and Doc Bundy. Victory in the Lights class went to the No. 93 Mid-O/Rusty Jones Argo JM16 driven by Kelly Marsh, Ron Pawley, and Don Marsh. Victory in the GTU class went to the No. 71 Team Highball Mazda RX-7 driven by Amos Johnson, Jack Dunham, and Yojiro Terada.

== Race results ==
Class winners in bold.

Pos	Class	No	Team	Drivers	Car	Laps
1	**GTP**	**8**	(United States) **Henn's Swap Shop Racing**	(United States) **A. J. Foyt** (France) **Bob Wollek** (United States) **Al Unser** (Belgium) **Thierry Boutsen**	**Porsche 962**	**703**
2	GTP	14	(United States) Holbert Racing	(United States) Al Holbert (United States) Al Unser Jr. (United Kingdom) Derek Bell	Porsche 962	686
3	GTP	67	(United States) BFGoodrich	(United States) Jim Busby (United States) Rick Knoop (Germany) Jochen Mass	Porsche 962	674
4	GTP	5	(United States) Bob Akin Motor Racing	(Germany) Hans-Joachim Stuck (United States) Bob Akin (United States) Paul Miller	Porsche 962	670
5	GTP	7	(United States) Bob Akin Motor Racing	(United States) Jim Mullen (Canada) Kees Nierop (United States) Ray McIntyre	Porsche 935	668
6	GTP	2	(United States) Leon Bros. Racing	(United States) Skeeter McKitterick (United States) Terry Wolters (United States) Art Leon	March 84G	654
7	GTP	1	(United States) Leon Bros. Racing	(United States) Bill Whittington (United States) Randy Lanier (United States) Al Leon	March 85G	652
8	**GTO**	**65**	(United States) **Roush Racing**	(United States) **Wally Dallenbach Jr.** (Canada) **John Jones** (United States) **Doc Bundy**	**Ford Mustang**	**637**
9	GTP	9	(United States) Personalized Autohaus	(United States) Jack Newsum (United States) Wayne Baker (United States) Chip Mead (United States) Ren Tilton	Porsche 935	624
10	**Lights**	**93**	(United States) **Mid-O/Rusty Jones**	(United States) **Kelly Marsh** (United States) **Ron Pawley** (United States) **Don Marsh**	**Argo JM16**	**602**
11	GTO	53	(United States) Mandeville Auto/Tech	(United States) Danny Smith (United States) Tom Waugh (Puerto Rico) Diego Febles	Mazda RX-7	599
12	**GTU**	**71**	(United States) **Team Highball**	(United States) **Amos Johnson** (United States) **Jack Dunham** (Japan) **Yojiro Terada**	**Mazda RX-7**	**599**
13	Lights	63	(United States) RGP 500 Racing	(United States) Jim Downing (United States) John Maffucci (Japan) Yoshimi Katayama	Argo JM16	599
14	GTO	09	(United States) 901 Shop	(United States) Mike Schaefer (United States) Peter Uria (United States) Jack Refenning (United States) Larry Figaro	Porsche 911 Carrera RSR	586
15	GTO	90	(United States) Road Circuit Tech	(United States) Les Delano (United States) Andy Petery (United States) Tommy Riggins	Pontiac Firebird	578
16	GTO	21	(United States) Gopher Motion	(United States) Steve Cohen (United States) Don Walker (United States) William Gelles	Ferrari 512	567
17	GTP	6	(United States) Morgan Performance	(United States) Charles Morgan (United States) Bill Alsup (United States) Jim Miller	Royale RP40	564
18	GTU	42	(United States) Mike Meyer/Daffy SWR	(United States) Scott Pruett (United States) Paul Lewis (United States) Joe Varde	Mazda RX-7	558
19	GTU	99	(United States) All American Racers	(United States) Chris Cord (United States) Dennis Aase	Toyota Celica	533
20	GTO	92	(United States) OMR Engines	(United States) Chris Gennone (United States) Fern Prego (United States) Hoyt Overbagh (United States) Lewis Fuller	Chevrolet Camaro	516
21 DNF	GTP	11	(United States) Kendall Racing	(United States) Chuck Kendall (Australia) Peter Fitzgerald (United States) John Hotchkis	Porsche 935	512
22	GTP	30	(Italy) Momo Corse	(Italy) Giampiero Moretti (United States) Jim Trueman (Italy) Massimo Sigala	Alba AR5	505
23	Lights	37	(United States) Aerex Manufacturing	(United States) Peter Welter (United States) Nick Nicholson (United States) Tom Burdsall	Tiga GT284	501
24	GTO	96	(Australia) Allan Moffat Racing	(Canada) Allan Moffat (Australia) Gregg Hansford (Australia) Kevin Bartlett (Australia) Peter McLeod	Mazda RX-7	482
25	GTU	94	(United States) 49th Star Racing	(United States) William Pfalf (United States) Skip Winfree (United States) Wally Hopkins	Porsche 911	477
26	GTO	73	(United States) Wolf Engines	(United States) Clark Howey (United States) Dale Koch (United States) Tracy Wolf	Chevrolet Camaro	467
27	GTO	78	(United States) Raul Garcia	(United States) Raul Garcia (United States) Eugenio Matienzo	Pontiac Firebird	454
28	GTP	3	(United States) Pegasus Racing	(United States) Bobby Allison (United States) Wayne Pickering (United States) Ken Madren	March 84G	437
29	GTO	83	(United States) K&P Racing	(United States) William Wessel (United States) Robert Whitaker (United States) Mark Kennedy (United States) Karl Keck	Chevrolet Corvette	436
30	GTO	43	(United States) Starved Rock Lodge	(United States) Rusty Schmidt (United States) Scott Schmidt (United States) Max Schmidt	Chevrolet Corvette	413
31 DNF	GTO	35	(United States) Team Dallas	(United States) M. L. Speer (United States) Bobby Hefner (United States) Jack Griffin	Porsche 911 Carrera RSR	395
32 DNF	GTP	15	(United States) Kalagian Racing	(United States) John Kalagian (United States) John Lloyd (United States) Tom Grunnah	March 84G	394
33 DNF	GTP	33	(United States) Bo-And Racing	(United States) Richard Anderson (United States) Bard Boand (United States) Mike Brummer	Lola T600	373
34	GTO	22	(United States) Walter Johnston	(United States) Del Russo Taylor (United Kingdom) John Hayes-Harlow (United States) Bob Lee	Pontiac Firebird	351
35	GTU	49	(United States) Conrad Racing	(United States) Albert Naon Jr. (United States) Dennis Vitolo (United States) Fernando Garcia	Porsche 911	336
36 DNF	GTP	45	(United States) Conte Racing	(United States) John Paul Jr. (Canada) Bill Adam (United States) Whitney Ganz	March 85G	330
37 DNF	GTO	80	(United States) Lindley Motor Ltd.	(United States) Neil Bonnett (United States) Jim Derhaag (United States) Les Lindley	Chevrolet Camaro	295
38 DNF	GTO	72	(United States) Centurion Auto Trans	(United States) Harold Shafer (United States) Tom Nehl (United States) Kent Painter	Chevrolet Camaro	283
39 DNF	GTO	29	(United States) Southern Racing Promins	(United States) Gary Baker (United States) Robin McCall (United States) Joe Ruttman	Chevrolet Corvette	281
40 DNF	GTP	0	(South Africa) Kreepy Krauly Racing	(South Africa) Sarel van der Merwe (South Africa) Tony Martin (South Africa) Ian Scheckter	March 84G	260
41 DNF	GTO	38	(United States) Mandeville Auto/Tech	(Japan) Takashi Yorino (United States) Logan Blackburn (United States) Roger Mandeville	Mazda RX-7	220
42 DNF	GTU	81	(United States) Mosler Racing	(United States) Steve Alexander (United States) Joe Hill (United States) George Alderman	Ferrari 308 GTB/GTS	219
43 DNF	GTO	89	(El Salvador) Scorpio Racing	(El Salvador) "Jamsal" (El Salvador) Eduardo Galdamez (Guatemala) "Anbagua"	Porsche 934	217
44 DNF	GTU	55	(Canada) Preston & Son Enterprises	(Canada) Robert Peters (Canada) George Schwarz (Canada) Andre Schwarz	Mazda RX-7	214
45 DNF	GTU	76	(United States) Malibu Grand Prix	(United States) Jack Baldwin (United States) Ira Young (United States) Jeff Kline	Mazda RX-7	205
46 DNF	GTP	44	(United States) Group 44	(United Kingdom) Brian Redman (United States) Bob Tullius (United States) Hurley Haywood	Jaguar XJR-5	203
47 DNF	GTU	57	(United States) Zwiren Racing	(United States) Steve Zwiren (United States) Tony Pio Costa (United States) Mike Allison (United States) Wes Donnington	Mazda RX-7	188
48 DNF	GTP	31	(United States) Goral Racing	(United States) Hugo Gralia (United States) Emory Donaldson (United States) Paul Goral	Porsche 935	183
49 DNF	GTO	51	(United States) Mosler Racing	(United States) John McComb (United States) Rick Mancuso (United States) Fred Fiala	Ferrari 512 BB	171
50 DNF	GTU	17	(United States) Al Bacon Racing	(United States) Al Bacon (United States) Charles Guest (New Zealand) Steve Millen	Mazda RX-7	170
51 DNF	GTP	4	(United States) Lee Racing	(United States) Lew Price (United States) Carson Baird (United States) Billy Hagan (United States) Terry Labonte	Lola T711	160
52 DNF	GTP	29	(United States) DeAtley Motorsports	(Republic of Ireland) Michael Roe (Republic of Ireland) Tommy Byrne (United States) Darin Brassfield	March 84G	159
53 DNF	GTP	95	(United States) Van Every Racing	(United States) Lance van Every (United States) Ash Tisdelle (United States) Jack Refenning	Porsche 935	157
54 DNF	GTO	06	(United States) Roush Racing	(United States) John Bauer (United States) Jim Miller (United States) Willy T. Ribbs	Ford Mustang	157
55 DNF	GTP	04	(United States) Group 44	(France) Claude Ballot-Léna (United States) Jim Adams (United States) Chip Robinson	Jaguar XJR-5	154
56 DNF	GTU	60	(United States) Hobbit Racing	(United States) Tony Swan (United States) Bob Ruth (United States) Steve Dietrich	Mazda RX-7	150
57 DNF	GTO	54	(United States) Dave Heinz Imports	(United States) Dave Heinz (United States) Dave Barnett (United States) Jerry Thompson	Chevrolet Corvette	138
58 DNF	GTO	66	(United States) Bob Beasley	(United States) Bob Beasley (United States) Jack Lewis (United States) Chuck Grantham	Porsche 911 Carrera RSR	118
59 DNF	GTP	68	(United States) BFGoodrich	(United States) Pete Halsmer (Austria) Dieter Quester (United States) John Morton	Porsche 962	107
60 DNF	GTP	86	(United States) Bayside Disposal Racing	(United States) Bruce Leven (France) Henri Pescarolo (Belgium) Thierry Boutsen	Porsche 962	101
61 DNF	GTO	97	(United States) Scyphers-Ankor Racing	(United States) Billy Scyphers (United States) Allen Glick (United States) Bill Cooper	Chevrolet Corvette	99
62 DNF	GTP	25	(United States) Red Lobster Racing	(United States) Kenper Miller (United States) Dave Cowart (Colombia) Mauricio de Narváez	March 83G	92
63 DNF	GTU	87	(United States) Performance Motorsports	(United States) Elliott Forbes-Robinson (United States) John Schneider (United States) Don Istook	Porsche 924 Carrera GTR	89
64 DNF	GTO	58	(United States) Coin Operated Racing	(United States) Jim Torres (United States) Don Kravig (United States) Michael Hammond	Porsche 934	86
65 DNF	GTU	13	(United States) Rubino Racing	(United States) Frank Rubino (United States) Dennis Wagoner (United States) Ken Knott	Mazda RX-7	67
66 DNF	GTP	20	(United States) Spirit of Cleveland	(United States) Freddy Baker (United States) Don Herman (United States) Rich Maher (United States) Richard Silver	Porsche 935	62
67 DNF	GTO	70	(United States) Ormond Racing	(United States) Don Cummings (United States) Craig Rubright (United States) Greg Walker	Chevrolet Corvette	58
68 DNF	GTP	07	(United States) LSJ Racing	(United States) Lyn St. James (United States) Tim Coconis (United States) Eric Lang	Argo JM16	54
69 DNF	GTU	08	(United States) Paul Romano	(United States) Drake Olson (United States) Steve Potter (United States) Willard Howe	Mazda RX-7	45
70 DNF	GTU	77	(United States) Championship Motorsports	(United States) Don Wallace (United States) John Petrick (United States) Don Sikes	Mazda RX-7	36
71 DNF	GTO	47	(United States) Dingman Bros. Racing	(United States) Walt Bohren (United States) Ron Bouchard (United States) Billy Dingman	Pontiac Firebird	35
72 DNF	GTO	41	(United States) Unlimited Telephones	(United States) Luis Sereix (United States) Ralph Noseda	Pontiac Firebird	28
73 DNF	GTU	84	(United States) Clay Young	(United States) Clay Young	Pontiac Fiero	21
74 DNF	GTP	16	(United States) Henn's Swap Shop Racing	(Germany) Harald Grohs (France) Jean-Louis Schlesser (United States) Preston Henn (Switzerland) Walter Brun	Porsche 935	15
75 DNF	GTP	61	(United States) Team USA/Deco Sales	(United States) Steve Shelton (United States) Don Courtney (United States) Brent O'Neill	Royale RP40	14
76 DNF	GTU	74	(United States) Whitehall Motorsports	(United States) Paul Gentilozzi (United States) Kent Hill (United States) Austin Godsey (United States) Bobby Akin	Porsche 924 Carrera GTR	12
DNS	GTP	88	(United States) Bayside Disposal Racing	(United States) Bruce Leven (France) Henri Pescarolo (Belgium) Thierry Boutsen	Porsche 962	-
DNS	GTP	19	(United States) Performance Motorcar	(United States) Jack Miller (United States) Carlos Ramirez (United States) Bruce Redding	Nimrod NRA/C2	-
DNS	GTO	64	(United States) Rene Rodriguez	(Venezuela) Ernesto Soto (United States) Rene Rodriguez	Chevrolet Corvette	-
DNS	GTP	05	(United States) Hi-Tech Racing	(United States) Tico Almeida (Cuba) Miguel Morejon	Porsche 935	-
DNS	GTU	00	(United States) Jim Logan	(United States) Jim Logan (New Zealand) Graham McRae (United States) Leonard Yanke	Dodge Daytona	-
DNS	GTU	27	(United States) Paul Fortner	(United States) Russell Gossett (United States) Gary Stephens (United States) Paul Wolfe	Datsun 280Z	-
DNS	GTP	85	(United States) Ralph Sanchez Racing	(Brazil) Emerson Fittipaldi (United States) Tony Garcia (Colombia) Mauricio de Narvaez	March 85G	-
DNQ	GTO	24	(United States) Kreider Racing	(United States) Dale Kreider (United States) Roy Newsome	Chevrolet Camaro	-
DNQ	GTU	34	El Salvador Racing	(United States) Alfredo Mena (United States) George Drolsom	Porsche 924 Carrera GTR	-
DNQ	GTU	02	(United States) RNGC Racing	(United States) Dale Kreider (United States) Roy Newsome	Mazda RX-7	-
DNQ	GTO	23	(United States) Import Restoration	(United States) Alan Howes (United States) Paul Reisman (United States) Bob Hebert	Porsche 911 Carrera RSR	-
DNQ	GTO	69	(United States) John Hofstra	(United States) John Hofstra (United States) Charles Slater	Porsche 911 Carrera RSR	-
DNQ	GTU	79	(United States) Whitehall Motorsports	(United States) Tom Winters (United States) Bob Bergstrom (United States) John Casey	Porsche 924 Carrera GTR	-
