= 1986 IMSA GT Championship =

16th season of the racing series organized by IMSA

Seasons
- ← 1985 1987 →

The 1986 Camel GT Championship season was the 16th season of the IMSA GT Championship auto racing series. It was for GTP and Lights classes of prototypes, as well as Grand Tourer-style racing cars which ran in the GTO and GTU classes. It began February 1, 1986, and ended October 26, 1986, after eighteen rounds.

== Schedule ==
The GT and Prototype classes did not participate in all events, nor did they race together at shorter events. Races marked as GT featured both GTO and GTU classes combined, while Proto signifies GTP and Lights running together. Races marked with All had all classes on track at the same time.

Rnd	Race	Length	Class	Circuit	Date
1	SunBank 24 at Daytona	24 Hours	All	Daytona International Speedway	February 1 February 2
2	Löwenbräu Grand Prix of Miami	45 Minutes	GTO	Streets of Miami	March 2
2	Löwenbräu Grand Prix of Miami	30 Minutes	Lights	Streets of Miami	March 2
2	Löwenbräu Grand Prix of Miami	45 Minutes	GTU	Streets of Miami	March 2
2	Löwenbräu Grand Prix of Miami	3 Hours	GTP	Streets of Miami	March 2
3	Coca-Cola Classic 12 Hours of Sebring	12 Hours	All	Sebring International Raceway	March 22
4	Atlanta Journal-Constitution Grand Prix	45 Minutes	GT	Road Atlanta	April 5
4	Atlanta Journal-Constitution Grand Prix	500 km	Proto	Road Atlanta	
5	Los Angeles Times/Ford Grand Prix	6 Hours	All	Riverside International Raceway	April 27
6	Monterey Triple Crown	300 km	Proto	Laguna Seca Raceway	May 4
6	Monterey Triple Crown	100 km	GT	Laguna Seca Raceway	May 4
7	Charlotte Grand Prix	300 km	GT	Charlotte Motor Speedway	May 17
7	Charlotte Grand Prix	500 km	Proto	Charlotte Motor Speedway	May 18
8	Lime Rock Grand Prix	150 Laps	Proto	Lime Rock Park	May 26
9	Mid-Ohio Grand Prix	250 km	GT	Mid-Ohio Sports Car Course	June 8
9	Mid-Ohio Grand Prix	500 km	Proto	Mid-Ohio Sports Car Course	June 8
10	Grand Prix of Palm Beach	45 Minutes	GTU	West Palm Beach Street Circuit	June 22
10	Grand Prix of Palm Beach	45 Minutes	GTO	West Palm Beach Street Circuit	June 22
10	Grand Prix of Palm Beach	3 Hours	Proto	West Palm Beach Street Circuit	June 22
11	Camel Continental	500 Miles	All	Watkins Glen International	July 6
12	G.I. Joe's Grand Prix	300 km	GT	Portland International Raceway	July 27
12	G.I. Joe's Grand Prix	300 km	Proto	Portland International Raceway	July 27
13	Ford California Grand Prix	300 km	Proto	Sears Point Raceway	August 3
13	Ford California Grand Prix	100 km	GT	Sears Point Raceway	August 3
14	Löwenbräu Classic	500 Miles	All	Road America	August 24
15	Camel Grand Prix	2 Hours	GT	Lime Rock Park	September 1
16	Kodak Copier 500	300 km	GT	Watkins Glen International	September 20
16	Kodak Copier 500	500 km	Proto	Watkins Glen International	September 21
17	Columbus Ford Dealers 500	500 km	Proto	Columbus Street Circuit	October 5
17	Columbus Ford Dealers 500	1 Hour	GT	Columbus Street Circuit	October 5
18	Eastern 3 Hours of Daytona	100 km	GTU	Daytona International Speedway	October 26
18	Eastern 3 Hours of Daytona	3 Hours	Proto/GTO	Daytona International Speedway	October 26

== Season results ==
Rnd	Circuit	GTP Winning Team	Lights Winning Team	GTO Winning Team	GTU Winning Team	Results
Rnd	Circuit	GTP Winning Drivers	Lights Winning Drivers	GTO Winning Drivers	GTU Winning Drivers	Results
1	Daytona	(United States) #14 Holbert Racing	(United States) #13 Outlaw Racing	(United States) #64 Raintree Corp.	(United States) #71 Team Highball	Results
1	Daytona	(United States) Al Holbert (United States) Al Unser Jr. (United Kingdom) Derek Bell	(United States) Frank Rubino (United States) Ray Mummery (United States) John Schneider	(United States) Lee Mueller (United States) Maurice Hassey (United States) Lanny Hester	(United States) Jack Dunham (United States) Amos Johnson (United States) Dennis Shaw	Results
2	Miami	(United States) #86 Bayside Disposal	(United States) #01 AT&T	(United States) #76 Peerless Racing	(United States) #55 Huffaker Eng.	Results
2	Miami	(France) Bob Wollek (Italy) Paolo Barilla	(United States) Don Bell	(United States) Jack Baldwin	(United States) Bob Earl	Results
3	Sebring	(United States) #5 Bob Akin Racing	(United States) #66 Mike Meyer Racing	(United States) #7 7-Eleven Roush	(United States) #38 Mandeville Auto	Results
3	Sebring	(United States) Bob Akin (West Germany) Hans-Joachim Stuck (Austria) Jo Gartner	(United States) Mike Meyer (United States) Jeff Kline (United States) Jim Rothbarth	(United States) Scott Pruett (United States) Caitlyn Jenner (Note: Jenner changed her name due to gender transition in 2015.)	(United States) Roger Mandeville (United States) Danny Smith	Results
4	Road Atlanta	(United States) #52 Hendrick	(United States) #63 Certified Brakes	(United States) #11 Roush Racing	(United States) #55 Huffaker Eng.	Results
4	Road Atlanta	(United States) Doc Bundy (South Africa) Sarel van der Merwe	(United States) Jim Downing (United States) John Maffucci	(United States) Scott Pruett	(United States) Bob Earl	Results
5	Riverside	(United States) #16 Dyson Racing	(United States) #63 Certified Brakes	(United States) #76 Peerless Racing	(United States) #38 Mandeville Auto	Results
5	Riverside	(United States) Price Cobb (United States) Rob Dyson	(United States) Jim Downing (United States) John Maffucci	(United States) Jack Baldwin (United States) Jim Miller	(United States) Roger Mandeville (United States) Danny Smith	Results
6	Laguna Seca	(United States) #7 Zakspeed USA	(United Kingdom) #24 Spice Engineering	(United States) #07 Roush Racing	(United States) #75 Clayton Cunningham	Results
6	Laguna Seca	(West Germany) Klaus Ludwig	(United States) Bob Earl	(United States) Scott Pruett	(United States) Tommy Kendall	Results
7	Charlotte	(United States) #16 Dyson Racing	(United Kingdom) #24 Spice Engineering	(United States) #76 City Peerless	(United States) #75 Clayton Cunningham	Results
7	Charlotte	(United States) Price Cobb (United States) Drake Olson	(United States) Bob Earl (United Kingdom) Ray Bellm	(United States) Jack Baldwin	(United States) Tommy Kendall	Results
8	Lime Rock	(United States) #14 Holbert Racing	(United States) #70 Z&W Motorsports	Did Not Participate	Did Not Participate	Results
8	Lime Rock	(United States) Al Holbert	(United States) David Loring			Results
9	Mid-Ohio	(United States) #14 Holbert Racing	(United States) #09 Ball Bros. Racing	(United States) #11 Roush Racing	(United States) #55 Huffaker Eng.	Results
9	Mid-Ohio	(United States) Al Holbert (United Kingdom) Derek Bell	(United States) Steve Durst (United States) Mike Brockman	(United States) Scott Pruett	(United States) Bob Earl	Results
10	Palm Beach	(United States) #52 Hendrick	(United States) #80 Gaston Andrey	(United States) #11 Roush Racing	(United States) #38 Mandeville	Results
10	Palm Beach	(United States) Doc Bundy (South Africa) Sarel van der Merwe	(Italy) Carlo Facetti (Italy) Ruggero Melgrati	(United States) Scott Pruett	(United States) Roger Mandeville	Results
11	Watkins Glen	(United States) #14 Holbert Racing	(United States) #6 Morgan Perf.	(United States) #76 Peerless Racing	(United States) #38 Mandeville Auto	Results
11	Watkins Glen	(United States) Al Holbert (United Kingdom) Derek Bell	(United States) Charles Morgan (United States) Logan Blackburn	(United States) Jack Baldwin (United States) Geoff Bodine	(United States) Roger Mandeville (United States) Danny Smith	Results
12	Portland	(United States) #14 Holbert Racing	(United States) #63 Certified Brakes	(United States) #7 Roush Racing	(United States) #55 Huffaker Racing	Results
12	Portland	(United States) Al Holbert	(United States) Jim Downing	(United States) Scott Pruett (United States) Caitlyn Jenner	(United States) Bob Earl	Results
13	Sears Point	(United States) #16 Dyson Racing	(United States) #63 Certified Brakes	(United States) #77 Brooks Racing	(United States) #75 Clayton Cunningham	Results
13	Sears Point	(United States) Price Cobb (United States) Rob Dyson	(United States) Jim Downing	(United States) Willy T. Ribbs	(United States) Tommy Kendall	Results
14	Road America	(United States) #14 Holbert Racing	(United States) #80 Gaston Andrey	(United States) #98 All American Racers	(United States) #38 Mandeville Auto	Results
14	Road America	(United States) Al Holbert (United States) Al Unser Jr.	(Italy) Martino Finotto (Italy) Ruggero Melgrati	(United States) Rocky Moran (United States) Dennis Aase	(United States) Roger Mandeville (United States) Danny Smith	Results
15	Lime Rock	Did Not Participate	Did Not Participate	(United States) #76 Peerless-Hendrick	(United States) #75 Clayton Cunningham	Results
15	Lime Rock			(United States) Jack Baldwin	(United States) Tommy Kendall	Results
16	Watkins Glen	(United States) #18 BMW North America	(United Kingdom) #24 Spice Engineering	(United States) #98 All American Racers	(United States) #38 Mandeville Auto	Results
16	Watkins Glen	(United States) John Andretti (United States) Davy Jones	(United States) Bob Earl (United States) Chip Ganassi	(United States) Dennis Aase	(United States) Roger Mandeville	Results
17	Columbus	(United States) #85 Bayside Disposal	(United States) #09 Ball Bros. Racing	(United States) #77 Brooks Racing	(United States) #38 Mandeville Auto	Results
17	Columbus	(United States) Scott Pruett (France) Bob Wollek	(United States) Steve Durst (United States) Mike Brockman	(United States) Willy T. Ribbs	(United States) Roger Mandeville	Results
18	Daytona	(United States) #44 Group 44	(United States) #73 Howard Katz	(United States) #11 Roush Racing	(United States) #38 Mandeville Auto	Results
18	Daytona	(United States) Bob Tullius (United States) Chip Robinson	(United States) Howard Katz (United States) Steve Phillips	(United States) Scott Pruett	(United States) Roger Mandeville	Results
