= 1987 12 Hours of Sebring =

Endurance auto race

The 12 Hours of Sebring Grand Prix of Endurance, was the third round of the 1987 IMSA GT Championship and was held at the Sebring International Raceway, on March 21, 1987. Victory overall went to the No. 86 Bayside Disposal Racing Porsche 962 driven by Jochen Mass and Bobby Rahal.

The Sebring circuit had been changed considerably, eliminating much of the concrete apron and moving the track away from the 2 runways. The circuit had been shortened from 4.86 to 4.11 mi.

== Race results ==
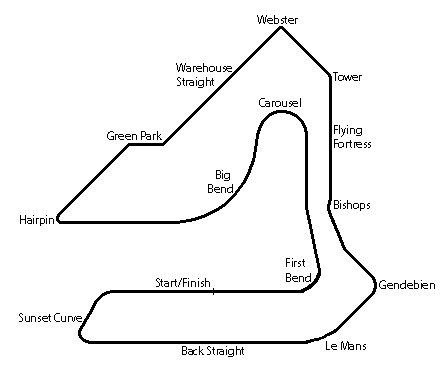
Sebring in 1987

Class winners in bold.

Pos	Class	No	Team	Drivers	Chassis	Tyre	Laps
Pos	Class	No	Team	Drivers	Engine	Tyre	Laps
1	**GTP**	**86**	(United States) **Bayside Disposal Racing**	(Germany) **Jochen Mass** (United States) **Bobby Rahal**	**Porsche 962**	**G**	**298**
1	**GTP**	**86**	(United States) **Bayside Disposal Racing**	(Germany) **Jochen Mass** (United States) **Bobby Rahal**	**Porsche 3.0L Flat 6 Turbo**	**G**	**298**
2	GTP	14	(United States) Holbert Racing	(United States) Chip Robinson (United States) Al Holbert	Porsche 962	**G**	296
2	GTP	14	(United States) Holbert Racing	(United States) Chip Robinson (United States) Al Holbert	Porsche 3.0L Flat 6 Turbo	**G**	296
3	GTP	8	(United States) Primus Motorsport	(United Kingdom) Brian Redman (United States) Chris Kneifel (United States) Elliot Forbes-Robinson	Porsche 962	**G**	293
3	GTP	8	(United States) Primus Motorsport	(United Kingdom) Brian Redman (United States) Chris Kneifel (United States) Elliot Forbes-Robinson	Porsche 3.0L Flat 6 Turbo	**G**	293
4	GTP	0	(Germany) Joest Racing	(South Africa) Sarel van der Merwe (Germany) "John Winter" (United States) Danny Ongais	Porsche 962	**G**	281
4	GTP	0	(Germany) Joest Racing	(South Africa) Sarel van der Merwe (Germany) "John Winter" (United States) Danny Ongais	Porsche 3.0L Flat 6 Turbo	**G**	281
5	**GTO**	**28**	(United States) **Protofab Racing**	(United States) **Greg Pickett** (United States) **Tommy Riggins**	**Chevrolet Camaro**	**G**	**281**
5	**GTO**	**28**	(United States) **Protofab Racing**	(United States) **Greg Pickett** (United States) **Tommy Riggins**	**Chevrolet 6.0L V8 N/A**	**G**	**281**
6	GTP	5	(United States) Bob Akin Motor Racing	(United Kingdom) James Weaver (United States) Bob Akin (United States) Steve Shelton	Porsche 962	**Y**	280
6	GTP	5	(United States) Bob Akin Motor Racing	(United Kingdom) James Weaver (United States) Bob Akin (United States) Steve Shelton	Porsche 3.0L Flat 6 Turbo	**Y**	280
7	GTP	67	(United States) Busby Racing	(France) Bob Wollek (United States) Darin Brassfield (United States) Wally Dallenbach Jr.	Porsche 962	**BF**	275
7	GTP	67	(United States) Busby Racing	(France) Bob Wollek (United States) Darin Brassfield (United States) Wally Dallenbach Jr.	Porsche 3.0L Flat 6 Turbo	**BF**	275
8	GTO	22	(United States) Roush Racing	(United States) Bruce Jenner (United States) Bobby Akin	Ford Mustang	?	274
8	GTO	22	(United States) Roush Racing	(United States) Bruce Jenner (United States) Bobby Akin	Ford 6.0L N/A	?	274
9	GTO	98	(United States) All American Racers	(United States) Chris Cord (Argentina) Juan Manuel Fangio II	Toyota Celica	**G**	267
9	GTO	98	(United States) All American Racers	(United States) Chris Cord (Argentina) Juan Manuel Fangio II	Toyota 2.0L I4 Turbo	**G**	267
10	**Lights**	**42**	(United States) **MMG/White Allen**	(United States) **John Higgins** (Canada) **Charles Monk** (United States) **Howard Cherry**	**Fabcar CL**	?	**265**
10	**Lights**	**42**	(United States) **MMG/White Allen**	(United States) **John Higgins** (Canada) **Charles Monk** (United States) **Howard Cherry**	**Porsche 3.0L Flat 6 N/A**	?	**265**
11	Lights	05	(United States) RM Racing	(United States) Charles Morgan (United States) Jim Rothbarth	Royale RP40	?	261
11	Lights	05	(United States) RM Racing	(United States) Charles Morgan (United States) Jim Rothbarth	Mazda 1.3L 2 Rotor	?	261
12	Lights	09	(United States) Ball Bros. Racing	(United States) Steve Durst (United States) Mike Brockman (United States) Tony Belcher	Spice SE86CL	?	261
12	Lights	09	(United States) Ball Bros. Racing	(United States) Steve Durst (United States) Mike Brockman (United States) Tony Belcher	Pontiac 3.0L I4 N/A	?	261
13	GTO	65	(United States) Grey Eagle Racing	(United States) Jerry Clinton (United States) Morris Clement (United States) Stanton Barrett	Ford Mustang	**F**	256
13	GTO	65	(United States) Grey Eagle Racing	(United States) Jerry Clinton (United States) Morris Clement (United States) Stanton Barrett	?	**F**	256
14	Lights	63	(United States) Jim Downing	(United States) Jim Downing (United States) John Maffucci (United States) John O'Steen	Argo JM19	**G**	253
14	Lights	63	(United States) Jim Downing	(United States) Jim Downing (United States) John Maffucci (United States) John O'Steen	Mazda 1.3L 2 Rotor	**G**	253
15 DNF	Lights	19	(United States) S&L Racing	(United States) Scott Schubot (United States) Linda Ludemann (United States) Lance Jones	Tiga GT285	?	252
15 DNF	Lights	19	(United States) S&L Racing	(United States) Scott Schubot (United States) Linda Ludemann (United States) Lance Jones	Mazda 1.3L 2 Rotor	?	252
16	GTO	74	(United States) Whitehall Rocketsports	(United States) Paul Gentilozzi (United States) Irv Hoerr (United States) Tom Winters	Oldsmobile Toronado	?	251
16	GTO	74	(United States) Whitehall Rocketsports	(United States) Paul Gentilozzi (United States) Irv Hoerr (United States) Tom Winters	?	?	251
17	**GTU**	**17**	(United States) **Al Bacon Racing**	(United States) **Al Bacon** (United States) **Bob Reed**	**Mazda RX-7**	**B**	**245**
17	**GTU**	**17**	(United States) **Al Bacon Racing**	(United States) **Al Bacon** (United States) **Bob Reed**	**Mazda Rotary**	**B**	**245**
18	GTU	54	(United States) SP Racing	(United States) Gary Auberlen (United States) Bill Auberlen (United States) Karl Durkheimer	Porsche 911 Carrera	**B**	244
18	GTU	54	(United States) SP Racing	(United States) Gary Auberlen (United States) Bill Auberlen (United States) Karl Durkheimer	Porsche Flat 6 N/A	**B**	244
19 DNF	GTO	76	(United States) Peerless/Hendrick	(United States) Jack Baldwin (Canada) Eppie Wietzes	Chevrolet Camaro	**G**	243
19 DNF	GTO	76	(United States) Peerless/Hendrick	(United States) Jack Baldwin (Canada) Eppie Wietzes	Chevrolet 5.5L V8 N/A	**G**	243
20	GTU	89	(United States) 901 Racing	(United States) Peter Uria (United States) Larry Figaro (United States) Kyle Rathbun (United States) Jack Refenning	Porsche 911 Carrera RSR	?	243
20	GTU	89	(United States) 901 Racing	(United States) Peter Uria (United States) Larry Figaro (United States) Kyle Rathbun (United States) Jack Refenning	Porsche Flat 6 N/A	?	243
21	GTO	87	(United States) Morrison-Cook Motorsport	(United States) Tommy Morrison (United States) Stu Hayner (United States) Don Knowles (United States) Bob McConnell	Chevrolet Corvette	**G**	241
21	GTO	87	(United States) Morrison-Cook Motorsport	(United States) Tommy Morrison (United States) Stu Hayner (United States) Don Knowles (United States) Bob McConnell	Chevrolet V8 N/A	**G**	241
22	GTO	30	(United States) Skoal Bandit Racing	(United States) Buz McCall (United States) Walt Bohren (United States) Paul Dallenbach	Chevrolet Camaro	**G**	241
22	GTO	30	(United States) Skoal Bandit Racing	(United States) Buz McCall (United States) Walt Bohren (United States) Paul Dallenbach	Chevrolet V8 N/A	**G**	241
23	Lights	43	(United States) MMG/White Allen	(United States) Tim McAdam (United States) Scott Overbey (United States) Chip Mead	Fabcar CL	**G**	238
23	Lights	43	(United States) MMG/White Allen	(United States) Tim McAdam (United States) Scott Overbey (United States) Chip Mead	Porsche 3.0L Flat 6 N/A	**G**	238
24	GTU	75	(United States) Clayton Cunningham Racing	(United States) Tommy Kendall (United States) Bart Kendall (United States) Max Jones	Mazda RX-7	**F**	236
24	GTU	75	(United States) Clayton Cunningham Racing	(United States) Tommy Kendall (United States) Bart Kendall (United States) Max Jones	Mazda Rotary	**F**	236
25	Lights	35	(United States) Diman Racing	(Puerto Rico) Mandy Gonzalez (Puerto Rico) Manuel Villa (Puerto Rico) Luis Gordillo	Royale RP40	**B**	235
25	Lights	35	(United States) Diman Racing	(Puerto Rico) Mandy Gonzalez (Puerto Rico) Manuel Villa (Puerto Rico) Luis Gordillo	Porsche 3.0L Flat 6 N/A	**B**	235
26	Lights	61	(United States) Performance Technology	(United States) Brent O'Neill (United States) John Lloyd	Argo JM19	**G**	230
26	Lights	61	(United States) Performance Technology	(United States) Brent O'Neill (United States) John Lloyd	Buick 3.0L V6 N/A	**G**	230
27	GTU	84	(United States) Guy Church	(United States) Guy Church (United States) Tom Hunt (United States) E. J. Generotti	Mazda RX-7	**HO**	226
27	GTU	84	(United States) Guy Church	(United States) Guy Church (United States) Tom Hunt (United States) E. J. Generotti	Mazda Rotary	**HO**	226
28	GTU	82	(United States) Dick Greer Racing	(United States) Dick Greer (United States) Mike Mees (United States) John Finger	Mazda RX-7	**Y**	225
28	GTU	82	(United States) Dick Greer Racing	(United States) Dick Greer (United States) Mike Mees (United States) John Finger	Mazda Rotary	**Y**	225
29	GTU	46	(United States) Turbo Concepts	(Cuba) Miguel Morejon (United States) Herman Galeano	Porsche 911	?	224
29	GTU	46	(United States) Turbo Concepts	(Cuba) Miguel Morejon (United States) Herman Galeano	Porsche Flat 6 N/A	?	224
30	GTU	71	(United States) Team Highball	(United States) Amos Johnson (United States) Dennis Shaw	Mazda RX-7	**Y**	217
30	GTU	71	(United States) Team Highball	(United States) Amos Johnson (United States) Dennis Shaw	Mazda 1.2L Rotary	**Y**	217
31	GTO	11	(United States) Roush Racing	(United States) Lyn St. James (United States) Tom Gloy	Ford Mustang	?	213
31	GTO	11	(United States) Roush Racing	(United States) Lyn St. James (United States) Tom Gloy	?	?	213
32	GTO	85	(United States) Highlands Racing	(United States) William Boyer (United States) Steve Roberts	Pontiac Firebird	**HO**	211
32	GTO	85	(United States) Highlands Racing	(United States) William Boyer (United States) Steve Roberts	?	**HO**	211
33	GTU	00	(United States) S Squared Engineering	(United States) Charles Slater (United States) Dave Duttinger (Canada) Rudy Bartling	Porsche 911 Carrera RSR	?	209
33	GTU	00	(United States) S Squared Engineering	(United States) Charles Slater (United States) Dave Duttinger (Canada) Rudy Bartling	Porsche Flat 6 N/A	?	209
34 DNF	GTO	81	(United States) Sentry Band Equipment	(United States) Ken Bupp (United States) Guy Church (United States) Del Russo Taylor	Chevrolet Camaro	**HO**	205
34 DNF	GTO	81	(United States) Sentry Band Equipment	(United States) Ken Bupp (United States) Guy Church (United States) Del Russo Taylor	Chevrolet V8 N/A	**HO**	205
35	Lights	23	(United States) Motion Promotions	(United States) George Petrilak (United States) Dave Rosenberg (United States) Bruce MacInnes	Argo JM16	?	201
35	Lights	23	(United States) Motion Promotions	(United States) George Petrilak (United States) Dave Rosenberg (United States) Bruce MacInnes	Buick 3.0L V6 N/A	?	201
36	GTU	68	(United States) Chambers Racing	(United States) Dennis Chambers (United States) Chaunce Wallace	Mazda RX-7	**HO**	201
36	GTU	68	(United States) Chambers Racing	(United States) Dennis Chambers (United States) Chaunce Wallace	Mazda Rotary	**HO**	201
37	GTU	08	(United States) Simms Romano Enterprises	(United States) Paul Romano (Canada) Vance Swifts (United States) John Drew	Mazda RX-7	?	188
37	GTU	08	(United States) Simms Romano Enterprises	(United States) Paul Romano (Canada) Vance Swifts (United States) John Drew	Mazda Rotary	?	188
38	Lights	52	(United States) Wonzer Racing	(United States) Ron Case (United States) Bruce Dewey (United States) Buzz Cason (United States) Nort Northam	Lola T616	?	186
38	Lights	52	(United States) Wonzer Racing	(United States) Ron Case (United States) Bruce Dewey (United States) Buzz Cason (United States) Nort Northam	Mazda 1.3L 2 Rotor	?	186
39	GTP	4	(United States) Roush Racing	(United States) Scott Pruett (United States) Pete Halsmer	Ford Mustang	?	179
39	GTP	4	(United States) Roush Racing	(United States) Scott Pruett (United States) Pete Halsmer	?	?	179
40 DNF	Lights	80	(United States) Gaston Andrey Racing	(Italy) Martino Finotto (Italy) Ruggero Melgrati (Italy) Pietro Silva	Alba AR6	?	177
40 DNF	Lights	80	(United States) Gaston Andrey Racing	(Italy) Martino Finotto (Italy) Ruggero Melgrati (Italy) Pietro Silva	Ferrari 3.0L V8 N/A	?	177
41	GTO	24	(United States) C. A. R. Enterprises	(United States) Craig Rubright (United States) Garrett Jenkins (United States) Roy Newsome	Chevrolet Corvette	?	165
41	GTO	24	(United States) C. A. R. Enterprises	(United States) Craig Rubright (United States) Garrett Jenkins (United States) Roy Newsome	Chevrolet V8 N/A	?	165
42 DNF	GTO	90	(United States) Bob's Speed Products	(United States) Bob Lee (United States) Gary Myers (United States) Timothy S. Lee	Buick Skyhawk	?	161
42 DNF	GTO	90	(United States) Bob's Speed Products	(United States) Bob Lee (United States) Gary Myers (United States) Timothy S. Lee	?	?	161
43	GTO	50	(United States) Henry A. Brosnaham	(United States) Henry Brosnaham (United States) Glen Cross (United States) Jim Johnson	Chevrolet Camaro	**G**	158
43	GTO	50	(United States) Henry A. Brosnaham	(United States) Henry Brosnaham (United States) Glen Cross (United States) Jim Johnson	Chevrolet V8 N/A	**G**	158
44 DNF	Lights	25	(United States) Gaston Andrey Racing	(United States) David Loring (United States) Roger Andrey (United States) Willy Lewis	Tiga GT286	?	145
44 DNF	Lights	25	(United States) Gaston Andrey Racing	(United States) David Loring (United States) Roger Andrey (United States) Willy Lewis	Ferrari 3.0L V8 N/A	?	145
45 DNF	GTU	44	(United States) Goral Racing	(United States) Paul Goral (United States) Rusty Bond (United States) Larry Figaro	Porsche 911	**G**	140
45 DNF	GTU	44	(United States) Goral Racing	(United States) Paul Goral (United States) Rusty Bond (United States) Larry Figaro	?	**G**	140
46 DNF	GTO	49	(United States) Catters Racing Team	(United States) Carlos Munoz (United States) Carlos Catter (United States) Joe Gonzalez	Pontiac Firebird	?	136
46 DNF	GTO	49	(United States) Catters Racing Team	(United States) Carlos Munoz (United States) Carlos Catter (United States) Joe Gonzalez	?	?	136
47 DNF	GTP	16	(United States) Dyson Racing	(United States) Price Cobb (Australia) Vern Schuppan	Porsche 962	?	123
47 DNF	GTP	16	(United States) Dyson Racing	(United States) Price Cobb (Australia) Vern Schuppan	Porsche 3.0L Flat 6 Turbo	?	123
48 DNF	GTU	60	(United States) Schaderacing	(United States) Steve DePoyster (United States) Bob Schader (United States) Jim Kurz (United States) Mike Jocelyn	Mazda RX-7	?	114
48 DNF	GTU	60	(United States) Schaderacing	(United States) Steve DePoyster (United States) Bob Schader (United States) Jim Kurz (United States) Mike Jocelyn	Mazda Rotary	?	114
49 DNF	Lights	31	(United States) Gebhardt Racing USA	(United Kingdom) Greg Hobbs (United States) Gary Robinson (United Kingdom) David Hobbs (United States) Alf Gebhardt	Gebhardt JG853	**G**	110
49 DNF	Lights	31	(United States) Gebhardt Racing USA	(United Kingdom) Greg Hobbs (United States) Gary Robinson (United Kingdom) David Hobbs (United States) Alf Gebhardt	BMW 2.0L I4 N/A	**G**	110
50 DNF	Lights	96	(United States) Hessert Racing	(Peru) Eduardo Dibós Chappuis (United States) Keith Rinzler (United States) Tom Hessert	Tiga GT286	?	93
50 DNF	Lights	96	(United States) Hessert Racing	(Peru) Eduardo Dibós Chappuis (United States) Keith Rinzler (United States) Tom Hessert	Mazda 1.3L 2 Rotor	?	93
51 DNF	GTU	47	(United States) Cumberland Valley Racing	(Canada) Doug Mills (United States) Richard Oakley	Mazda RX-7	?	90
51 DNF	GTU	47	(United States) Cumberland Valley Racing	(Canada) Doug Mills (United States) Richard Oakley	Mazda Rotary	?	90
52 DNF	GTO	56	(United States) Bill Wink Racing	(United States) Bill Wink (United States) Bill Martin (United States) Don Erickson (United States) Tim Evans	Chevrolet Camaro	?	87
52 DNF	GTO	56	(United States) Bill Wink Racing	(United States) Bill Wink (United States) Bill Martin (United States) Don Erickson (United States) Tim Evans	Chevrolet V8 N/A	?	87
53 DNF	Lights	79	(United States) Whitehall Rocketsports	(United States) Skeeter McKitterick (United States) Ted Boady (United States) Paul Lewis	Alba AR5	?	86
53 DNF	Lights	79	(United States) Whitehall Rocketsports	(United States) Skeeter McKitterick (United States) Ted Boady (United States) Paul Lewis	Oldsmobile 3.0L N/A	?	86
54 DNF	GTO	99	(United States) All American Racers	(United States) Willy T. Ribbs (United States) Jerrill Rice	Toyota Celica	?	84
54 DNF	GTO	99	(United States) All American Racers	(United States) Willy T. Ribbs (United States) Jerrill Rice	Toyota 2.0L I4 Turbo	?	84
55 DNF	Lights	40	(Canada) Bieri Racing	(Canada) Uli Bieri (Switzerland) Angelo Pallavicini (United States) David Murry	Alba AR5	?	76
55 DNF	Lights	40	(Canada) Bieri Racing	(Canada) Uli Bieri (Switzerland) Angelo Pallavicini (United States) David Murry	Ferrari 3.0L V8 N/A	?	76
56 DNF	GTO	83	(United States) Shafer Racing	(United States) Craig Shafer (United States) Joe Maloy (United States) George Shafer	Chevrolet Camaro	?	76
56 DNF	GTO	83	(United States) Shafer Racing	(United States) Craig Shafer (United States) Joe Maloy (United States) George Shafer	Chevrolet V8 N/A	?	76
57 DNF	GTO	51	(United States) Quality Motorsports	(United States) Dave Heinz (United States) Bob Young	Chevrolet Corvette	?	75
57 DNF	GTO	51	(United States) Quality Motorsports	(United States) Dave Heinz (United States) Bob Young	Chevrolet V8 N/A	?	75
58 DNF	GTP	1	(United States) A. J. Foyt Enterprises	(United States) A. J. Foyt (United States) Danny Sullivan (United States) Hurley Haywood	Porsche 962	**G**	73
58 DNF	GTP	1	(United States) A. J. Foyt Enterprises	(United States) A. J. Foyt (United States) Danny Sullivan (United States) Hurley Haywood	Porsche 3.0L Flat 6 Turbo	**G**	73
59 DNF	GTU	13	(United States) Altman Bros Motor Racing	(United States) Mark Altman (United States) Gary Altman (United States) Tim Selby	Porsche 914-6 GT	?	68
59 DNF	GTU	13	(United States) Altman Bros Motor Racing	(United States) Mark Altman (United States) Gary Altman (United States) Tim Selby	Porsche Flat 6 N/A	?	68
60 DNF	Lights	9	(United States) Finco Racing	(United States) Fin Tomlinson (United States) Terry Loebel (United States) Richard Morgan	Tiga GT285	?	57
60 DNF	Lights	9	(United States) Finco Racing	(United States) Fin Tomlinson (United States) Terry Loebel (United States) Richard Morgan	Mazda 1.3L Rotary	?	57
61 DNF	GTO	38	(United States) Mandeville Auto Tech	(United States) Roger Mandeville (United States) Kelly Marsh (United States) Don Marsh	Mazda RX-7	?	56
61 DNF	GTO	38	(United States) Mandeville Auto Tech	(United States) Roger Mandeville (United States) Kelly Marsh (United States) Don Marsh	Mazda Rotary	?	56
62 DNF	Lights	36	(United States) Erie Scientific Racing	(United States) Frank Jellinek (United States) John Grooms (United States) Tom Bagley	Royale RP40	?	54
62 DNF	Lights	36	(United States) Erie Scientific Racing	(United States) Frank Jellinek (United States) John Grooms (United States) Tom Bagley	Mazda 1.3L 2 Rotor	?	54
63 DNF	GTO	26	(United States) Bob's Speed Products	(United States) Del Russo Taylor (United States) Mark Montgomery (United States) David Fuller	Pontiac Firebird	**G**	45
63 DNF	GTO	26	(United States) Bob's Speed Products	(United States) Del Russo Taylor (United States) Mark Montgomery (United States) David Fuller	?	**G**	45
64 DNF	GTO	91	(United States) Lucas Truck Service	(United States) Scott Gaylord (United States) Luis Albiza (United States) Kent Stover	Oldsmobile Calais	**G**	38
64 DNF	GTO	91	(United States) Lucas Truck Service	(United States) Scott Gaylord (United States) Luis Albiza (United States) Kent Stover	?	**G**	38
65 DNF	GTO	12	(United States) Centurion AutoTransport	(United States) Harold Shafer (United States) Tom Nehl (Canada) Robert Peters	Buick Somerset	**G**	36
65 DNF	GTO	12	(United States) Centurion AutoTransport	(United States) Harold Shafer (United States) Tom Nehl (Canada) Robert Peters	?	**G**	36
66 DNF	Lights	01	(United States) Spice Engineering	(United States) Jeff Kline (United States) Don Bell	Spice SE86L	?	31
66 DNF	Lights	01	(United States) Spice Engineering	(United States) Jeff Kline (United States) Don Bell	Pontiac 3.0L I4 N/A	?	31
67 DNF	GTO	77	(United States) Brooks Racing	(Finland) Robert Lappalainen (United States) Kenper Miller	Chevrolet Camaro	?	25
67 DNF	GTO	77	(United States) Brooks Racing	(Finland) Robert Lappalainen (United States) Kenper Miller	Chevrolet V8 N/A	?	25
68 DNF	GTO	72	(United States) Sunrise Racing	(United States) Jeff Loving (United States) Richard Small (United States) Jan Goodman	Chevrolet Camaro	?	23
68 DNF	GTO	72	(United States) Sunrise Racing	(United States) Jeff Loving (United States) Richard Small (United States) Jan Goodman	Chevrolet V8 N/A	?	23
69 DNF	GTU	15	(United States) Murray Racing	(United States) Dick Murray (United States) Terry Visger	Pontiac Fiero	?	20
69 DNF	GTU	15	(United States) Murray Racing	(United States) Dick Murray (United States) Terry Visger	Pontiac 3.0L I4 N/A	?	20
70 DNF	GTO	70	(United States) Hi-Tech Coating	(United States) Tom Juckette (United States) Richard McDill (United States) Bill McDill	Chevrolet Camaro	?	19
70 DNF	GTO	70	(United States) Hi-Tech Coating	(United States) Tom Juckette (United States) Richard McDill (United States) Bill McDill	Chevrolet V8 N/A	?	19
71 DNF	GTO	21	(United States) OMR Engines	(United States) Gene Felton (United States) Lee Perkinson (United States) Matt Mnich	Chevrolet Camaro	?	10
71 DNF	GTO	21	(United States) OMR Engines	(United States) Gene Felton (United States) Lee Perkinson (United States) Matt Mnich	Chevrolet V8 N/A	?	10
72 DNF	GTO	88	(United States) Morrison-Cook Motorsport	(United States) John Heinricy (United States) Bob McConnell (United States) Bobby Carradine	Chevrolet Corvette	?	9
72 DNF	GTO	88	(United States) Morrison-Cook Motorsport	(United States) John Heinricy (United States) Bob McConnell (United States) Bobby Carradine	Chevrolet V8 N/A	?	9
73 DNF	Lights	29	(United States) Ares Sports	(United States) Steve Phillips (United States) Ron Canizares (United States) Howard Katz	Tiga GT286	?	8
73 DNF	Lights	29	(United States) Ares Sports	(United States) Steve Phillips (United States) Ron Canizares (United States) Howard Katz	Buick 3.0L N/A	?	8
74 DNF	GTO	04	(United States) Dave White Racing	(United States) Arthur Pilla (United States) Dave White (United States) George Drolsom	Porsche 944 Turbo	?	7
74 DNF	GTO	04	(United States) Dave White Racing	(United States) Arthur Pilla (United States) Dave White (United States) George Drolsom	?	?	7
DNS	GTO	92	(United States) Lance van Every	(United States) Ash Tisdelle (United States) Lance van Every	Chevrolet Camaro	?	0
DNS	GTO	92	(United States) Lance van Every	(United States) Ash Tisdelle (United States) Lance van Every	Chevrolet V8 N/A	?	0
