= West Palm Beach Street Circuit =

Motorsports Park in Florida

- Location: West Palm Beach, Florida
- Coordinates: 26°43′30.55″N 80°4′51.06″W
- Opened: 1986
- Closed: 1991
- Major events: IMSA GT Championship (1986–1991)

South Florida Fairgrounds Street Circuit (1988–1991)
- Length: 1.620 mi (2.607 km)
- Turns: 11
- Race lap record: 0:58.120 ( (United States) Drake Olson, Eagle HF89, 1990, IMSA GTP)

Downtown Auditorium Street Circuit (1986–1987)
- Length: 1.600 mi (2.575 km)
- Turns: 10
- Race lap record: 1:05.960 ( (South Africa) Sarel van der Merwe, Chevrolet Corvette GTP, 1987, IMSA GTP)

The West Palm Beach Street Circuit was a temporary street circuit located in West Palm Beach, Florida, which hosted IMSA GT Championship races between 1986 and 1991.

== Lap records ==
The fastest official race lap records at the West Palm Beach Street Circuit are listed as:

Category	Time	Driver	Vehicle	Event
South Florida Fairgrounds Street Circuit (1988–1991): 1.620 mi (2.607 km)
IMSA GTP	0:58.120	Drake Olson	Eagle HF89	1990 Toyota Grand Prix of Palm Beach
IMSA GTP Lights	1:01.961	Fermín Vélez	Spice SE90P	1990 Toyota Grand Prix of Palm Beach
IMSA GTO	1:04.924	Pete Halsmer	Mazda RX-7	1991 Toyota Camel Grand Prix of Palm Beach
IMSA GTU	1:08.461	John Fergus	Dodge Daytona	1991 Toyota Camel Grand Prix of Palm Beach
IMSA AAC	1:12.212	Kendall Cranston	Chevrolet Camaro	1990 Toyota Camel Grand Prix of Palm Beach
Downtown Auditorium Street Circuit (1986–1987): 1.600 mi (2.575 km)
IMSA GTP	1:05.601	Doc Bundy	Chevrolet Corvette GTP	1986 Grand Prix of Palm Beach
IMSA GTO	1:09.750	Willy T. Ribbs	Toyota Celica Turbo IMSA GTO	1987 Grand Prix of Palm Beach
IMSA GTP Lights	1:10.760	Steve Phillips	Tiga GT286	1987 Grand Prix of Palm Beach
IMSA GTU	1:12.060	Terry Visger	Pontiac Fiero	1987 Grand Prix of Palm Beach
