= Columbus Street Circuit =

Motorsports Park in Ohio

- Location: Columbus, Ohio
- Coordinates: 39°57′50.81″N 83°0′10.13″W,
- Opened: 4 October 1985; 40 years ago
- Closed: 2 October 1988; 37 years ago
- Major events: IMSA GT Championship (1985–1988)

Street Circuit (1985–1988)
- Length: 2.300 mi (3.701 km)
- Turns: 10
- Race lap record: 1:32.520 ( (United States) Drake Olson/ (Australia) Geoff Brabham, Porsche 962/Nissan GTP ZX-T, 1985/1988, IMSA GTP)

The Columbus Street Circuit was a temporary street circuit located in Columbus, Ohio, which hosted IMSA GT Championship races between 1985 and 1988.

== Lap records ==
The fastest official race lap records at the Columbus Street Circuit are listed as:

Category	Time	Driver	Vehicle	Event
Street Circuit (1985–1988): 2.300 mi (3.701 km)
IMSA GTP	1:32.520	Drake Olson (Note: Both drivers took the same lap time exactly on different races.); Geoff Brabham	Porsche 962; Nissan GTP ZX-T	1985 Columbus Ford Dealers 500; 1988 Columbus Ford Dealers 500
IMSA GTO	1:37.640	Scott Pruett	Ford Mustang	1987 Columbus Ford Dealers 500
IMSA GTP Lights	1:41.370	Mike Brockman	Spice SE86CL	1987 Columbus Ford Dealers 500
IMSA GTU	1:45.500	Bob Leitzinger	Nissan 300ZX	1987 Columbus Ford Dealers 500
