= 1987 24 Hours of Daytona =

Previous: 1986	Next: 1988
Index: Races | Winners

Track map of Daytona International Speedway

The 25th Annual SunBank 24 at Daytona was a 24-hour endurance sports car race held on January 31-February 1, 1987 at the Daytona International Speedway road course. The race served as the opening round of the 1987 IMSA GT Championship.

Victory overall and in the GTP class went to the No. 14 Holbert Racing Porsche 962 driven by Chip Robinson, Derek Bell, Al Unser Jr., and Al Holbert. Victory in the GTO Class went to the No. 11 Roush Racing Ford Mustang driven by Tom Gloy, Bill Elliott, Lyn St. James, and Scott Pruett. Victory in the Lights class went to the No. 01 Spice Engineering/AT&T Spice SE86CL driven by Bob Earl, Don Bell, and Jeff Kline. Victory in the GTU class went to the No. 71 Team Highball Mazda RX-7 driven by Amos Johnson, Dennis Shaw, and Bob Lazier.

== Race results ==
Class winners in bold.

Pos	Class	No	Team	Drivers	Car	Laps
1	**GTP**	**14**	(United States) **Holbert Racing**	(United States) **Chip Robinson** (United Kingdom) **Derek Bell** (United States) **Al Unser Jr.** (United States) **Al Holbert**	**Porsche 962**	**753**
2	GTP	3	(Switzerland) Brun Motorsport	(Italy) Gianfranco Brancatelli (Argentina) Oscar Larrauri (Italy) Massimo Sigala	Porsche 962	745
3	GTP	16	(United States) Dyson Racing	(United States) Price Cobb (United States) Rob Dyson (Australia) Vern Schuppan	Porsche 962	742
4 DNF	GTP	1	(United States) A. J. Foyt Enterprises	(United States) A. J. Foyt (United States) Al Unser (United States) Danny Sullivan	Porsche 962	723
5	GTP	10	(United States) Hotchkis Racing, Inc.	(United States) Jim Adams (United States) John Hotchkis (United States) John Hotchkis Jr.	Porsche 962	719
6	GTP	5	(United States) Bob Akin Racing	(Germany) Hans-Joachim Stuck (United Kingdom) James Weaver (United States) Bob Akin	Porsche 962	700
7	**GTO**	**11**	(United States) **Roush Racing**	(United States) **Tom Gloy** (United States) **Bill Elliott** (United States) **Lyn St. James** (United States) **Scott Pruett**	**Ford Mustang**	**685**
8	GTO	98	(United States) All American Racers	(United States) Chris Cord (New Zealand) Steve Millen	Toyota Celica Turbo	681
9	GTO	22	(United States) Roush Racing	(United States) Deborah Gregg (United States) Bobby Akin (United States) Scott Pruett (Canada) Scott Goodyear	Ford Mustang	649
10	**GTU**	**71**	(United States) **Team Highball**	(United States) **Amos Johnson** (United States) **Dennis Shaw** (United States) **Bob Lazier**	**Mazda RX-7**	**642**
11	**Lights**	**01**	(United States) **Spice Engineering/AT&T**	(United States) **Bob Earl** (United States) **Don Bell** (United States) **Jeff Kline**	**Spice SE86CL**	**630**
12	Lights	42	(United States) White Allen Porsche	(United States) Howard Cherry (United States) John Higgins (United States) James King (United States) Chip Mead	Fabcar CL	626
13	GTU	82	(United States) Aspen Inn	(United States) Mike Mees (United States) Dick Greer (United States) John Finger	Mazda RX-7	622
14	Lights	36	(United States) Erie Scientific Racing	(United States) John Grooms (United States) Tom Bagley (United States) Frank Jellinek (United States) Augie Pabst	Badger BB	621
15	GTO	30	(United States) Skoal Bandit	(United States) Buz McCall (United States) Walt Bohren (United States) Paul Dallenbach	Chevrolet Camaro	616
16	Lights	19	(United States) Scott Schubot	(United States) Jim Brown (United States) Scott Schubot (United States) Linda Ludemann	Tiga GT285	597
17 DNF	GTO	99	(United States) All American Racers	(United States) Ricky Rudd (United States) Jerrill Rice (Argentina) Juan Manuel Fangio II	Toyota Celica Turbo	591
18	GTU	09	(United States) 901 Racing	(United States) Peter Uria (United States) Larry Figaro (United Kingdom) John Hayes-Harlow (United States) Kyle Rathbun	Porsche 911 Carrera RSR	580
19	GTO	38	(United States) Mandeville Auto/Tech	(United States) Roger Mandeville (United States) Kelly Marsh (United States) Danny Smith	Mazda RX-7	572
20	GTO	33	(United States) Roush Racing	(United States) Bruce Jenner (United States) Todd Morici (United States) Gary Baker	Ford Mustang	571
21	Lights	27	(United States) MSB Racing	(United States) Dave Cowart (United States) Kenper Miller (United States) Jim Fowells	Argo JM19	566
22	Lights	66	(United States) RM Racing	(United States) Charles Morgan (United States) Chris Gennone (United States) Jim Rothbarth	Royale RP40	554
23 DNF	GTU	75	(United States) CCR	(United States) Max Jones (United States) Bart Kendall (United States) Tommy Kendall	Mazda RX-7	522
24 DNF	GTO	21	(United States) Western Chemical	(Canada) Robert Peters (United States) Tom Nehl (United States) Kent Painter	Chevrolet Camaro	520
25	GTO	20	(United States) Hi-Tech Coating	(United States) Tom Juckette (United States) Bill McDill (United States) Mike Laws	Chevrolet Camaro	520
26	GTO	26	(United States) Bob's Speed Products	(United States) Ken Bupp (United States) Guy Church (United States) Del Russo Taylor	Pontiac Firebird	510
27	GTU	68	(United States) Schaderacing	(United States) Steve DePoyster (United States) Mike Jocelyn (United States) Jim Kurz (United States) Bob Schader	Mazda RX-7	503
28	GTU	78	(United States) Chambers Racing	(United States) Dennis Chambers (United States) Mike Meyer (United States) Tom Burdsall	Mazda RX-7	498
29	GTO	29	(United States) OMR Engines	(United States) Gene Felton (United States) Oma Kimbrough (United States) Hoyt Overbagh (United States) Lee Perkinson	Chevrolet Camaro	470
30	GTU	00	(United States) S Squared Engineering	(United States) Charles Slater (United States) Ernie Senator (United States) Dave Duttinger	Porsche 911 Carrera RSR	414
31 DNF	GTO	28	(United States) Protofab Racing	(United States) Greg Pickett (United States) Darrell Waltrip (United States) Terry Labonte	Chevrolet Camaro	410
32 DNF	Lights	96	(United States) Hessert Racing	(United States) Tom Hessert Jr. (United States) Keith Rinzler (Peru) Eduardo Dibós Chappuis	Tiga GT286	409
33	GTO	24	(United States) Car Enterprises	(United States) Craig Rubright (United States) Garrett Jenkins (United States) Roy Newsome	Chevrolet Corvette	404
34 DNF	GTO	6	(United States) Protofab Racing	(United States) Wally Dallenbach Jr. (Canada) John Jones (United States) Tommy Riggins	Chevrolet Camaro	402
35 DNF	GTU	47	(United States) Chaunce Wallace Racing	(United States) Richard Oakley (United States) Chaunce Wallace (Canada) Doug Mills	Mazda RX-7	386
36 DNF	GTP	51	(United Kingdom) Cosmik-Roy Baker Racing	(Greece) Costas Los (United States) John Schneider (United Kingdom) David Andrews	Tiga GC286	354
37 DNF	Lights	63	(United States) Certified Brakes Racing	(United States) Jim Downing (United States) John O'Steen (United States) John Maffucci	Argo JM19	352
38	GTO	32	(United States) K&P Racing	(United States) Mark Kennedy (United States) Karl Keck (United States) Mark Montgomery (United States) David Fuller	Chevrolet Corvette	346
39 DNF	GTO	87	(United States) Morrison-Cook Motorsport	(United States) Tommy Morrison (United States) Richard Ceppos (United States) Don Knowles (United States) Stu Hayner	Chevrolet Corvette	337
40 DNF	GTP	7	(Germany) Zakspeed	(United States) Whitney Ganz (United Kingdom) David Hobbs (Italy) Giampiero Moretti	Ford Mustang Probe	328
41	GTO	83	(United States) Sasco Motorsports	(United States) Tom Gaffney (United States) Paul Reisman (United States) Richard Stone (United States) Bob Hebert	Pontiac Firebird	316
42	GTU	08	(United States) Simms Romano	(Canada) Vance Swifts (United States) John Drew (United States) Dean Hall (United States) Paul Romano	Mazda RX-7	298
43 DNF	GTP	8	(United States) Primus Motorsport	(United Kingdom) Brian Redman (United States) Chris Kneifel (United States) Elliott Forbes-Robinson	Porsche 962	283
44 DNF	GTO	90	(United States) Road Circuit Tech	(United States) Andy Petery (United States) Les Delano (United States) Craig Carter	Buick Somerset	281
45 DNF	GTU	17	(United States) Al Bacon Racing	(United States) Al Bacon (United States) Rod Millen (United States) Bob Reed	Mazda RX-7	277
46 DNF	Lights	89	(United States) Ball Brothers Racing	(United States) Steve Durst (United States) Mike Brockman (United States) Tony Belcher (United States) Mark Abel	Spice SE86CL	273
47 DNF	GTO	76	(United States) Peerless/Hendrick	(United States) Jack Baldwin (Canada) Eppie Wietzes	Chevrolet Camaro	261
48 DNF	GTP	52	(United States) Hendrick Motorsports	(South Africa) Sarel van der Merwe (United States) Doc Bundy	Chevrolet Corvette GTP	255
49 DNF	Lights	80	(United States) Gaston Andrey Racing	(United States) Roger Andrey (Switzerland) Angelo Pallavicini (Canada) Uli Bieri	Alba AR2	246
50 DNF	GTP	25	(United States) DeAtley Motorsports	(United States) Jerry Brassfield (Republic of Ireland) Michael Roe (United States) John Bauer (United States) Norton Gaston	March 85G	245
51 DNF	Lights	31	(United States) Gebhardt Racing USA	(Sweden) Stanley Dickens (Germany) Frank Jelinski (United States) Gary Robinson (United Kingdom) Greg Hobbs	Gebhardt JC853	236
52 DNF	GTO	64	(United States) Raintree Corporation	(United States) Ken Johnson (United States) Maurice Hassey (United States) Lanny Hester	Ford Mustang	225
53 DNF	GTO	55	(United States) Greg Walker Racing	(United States) Nort Northam (United States) Scott Lagasse (United States) Dennis Krueger	Chevrolet Corvette	223
54 DNF	GTP	44	(United States) Group 44	(United States) Bob Tullius (United States) Hurley Haywood (United States) John Morton	Jaguar XJR-7	216
55 DNF	GTO	92	(United States) Van Every Racing	(United States) Lance van Every (United States) Rusty Bond (United States) Ash Tisdelle	Chevrolet Camaro	202
56 DNF	GTP	86	(United States) Bayside Disposal Racing	(Germany) Klaus Ludwig (Germany) Jochen Mass	Porsche 962	144
57 DNF	GTO	77	(United States) Brooks Racing	(United States) Bobby Archer (United States) Tommy Archer (Finland) Robert Lappalainen (United States) Leo Franchi	Chevrolet Camaro	121
58 DNF	GTP	4	(United States) Roush Racing	(United States) Scott Pruett (United States) Pete Halsmer (United States) Tom Gloy	Ford Mustang Maxum GTP	120
59 DNF	Lights	23	(United States) Motion Promotions	(United States) George Petrilak (South Africa) Graham Duxbury (United States) Bill Jacobson (United States) Helmut Silberberger	Argo JM16	119
60 DNF	Lights	9	(United States) Essex Racing	(United States) Steve Phillips (United States) Howard Katz (United States) Ron Nelson	Tiga GT285	111
61 DNF	GTO	13	(United States) Go Racing	(United States) Keith Lawhorn (United States) Vince Gimondo (United States) Ken Grostic	Oldsmobile Calais	104
62 DNF	GTP	67	(United States) Uniroyal Goodrich	(France) Bob Wollek (United States) Jim Busby (United States) Darin Brassfield	Porsche 962	89
63 DNF	GTO	50	(United States) Paul Canary Racing	(United States) Paul Canary (United States) Jerry Winston (United States) Phil Currin	Chevrolet Corvette	88
64 DNF	GTU	54	(United States) SP Racing	(United States) Bill Auberlen (United States) Karl Durkheimer (United States) Dieter Oest (United States) Gary Auberlen	Porsche 911 Carrera	87
65 DNF	GTO	88	(United States) Morrison-Cook Motorsport	(United States) John Heinricy (United States) Bob McConnell (Canada) Bill Adam (United States) Bobby Carradine	Chevrolet Corvette	77
66 DNF	GTO	74	(United States) Whitehall Rocketsports	(United States) Paul Gentilozzi (United States) Irv Hoerr (United States) Ted Boody	Oldsmobile Toronado	52
67 DNF	Lights	43	(United States) White Allen Porsche	(United States) Tom Pumpelly (United States) Scott Overbey (United States) Tim McAdam (United States) Thomas Schwietz	Fabcar CL	42
68 DNF	GTU	41	(United States) Hugo Gralia	(United States) Hugo Gralia (United States) Dennis Dobkin (United States) Carlos Padrera (United States) Secondo Tagliero	Mazda RX-7	30
69 DNF	Lights	79	(United States) Whitehall Rocketsports	(United States) Paul Lewis (United States) Skeeter McKitterick (United States) Tom Winters	Alba AR5	28
