= Chris Cord =

American racing driver (1940–2022)

- Born: July 15, 1940 Beverly Hills, California, US
- Died: July 28, 2022 (aged 82) Sun Valley, Idaho, US

IMSA GT Championship
- Years active: 1975–1993

Championship titles
- 1987: IMSA GT Championship – GTO Class

24 Hours of Le Mans career
- Years: 1978
- Teams: Porsche Kremer Racing
- Best finish: 6th (1978)
- Class wins: 1 (1978)

Chris Cord (July 15, 1940 – July 28, 2022) was an American racing driver and investment banker. He won the Group 5 SP class at the 1978 24 Hours of Le Mans and the 1987 IMSA GT Championship in the GTO class.

== Racing career ==
At the age of 15, Cord was a crew member for his father's team racing club races in California. After family friend Ernie McAfee died in a racing accident at Pebble Beach in 1956, Cord switched to motocross racing. Cord made his racing debut in the 1975 IMSA GT Championship at Riverside International Raceway.

At the 1978 24 Hours of Le Mans, Cord won the Group 5 SP class and finished sixth overall for Porsche Kremer Racing.

Cord entered a 1980 Chevrolet Monza for the 1980 24 Hours of Daytona.

Cord was recruited by Dan Gurney to drive a Toyota Celica for All American Racers for the 1984 IMSA GT Championship.

Cord won the 1987 IMSA GT Championship in the GTO class, winning four races. Cord was leading the GTO class of the 1987 24 Hours of Daytona with 30 minutes to go until the rear suspension of his Celica broke and was forced to pit for repair, resulting in a second-place finish in class. Cord's win in the final race of the season at Del Mar Fairgrounds clinched the manufacturers' championship for Toyota.

In 1988, Cord won two more races in the GTO class, including a comeback win at Mid-Ohio. Midway through the 1988 season, Cord had surgery to correct an intestinal disorder. Cord retired from full-time racing in 1989 due to health problems from surgery. Cord would later appear in IMSA Firehawk Series races in 1990.

== Personal life ==
Cord graduated from the University of Southern California with a business degree. He was the grandson of Errett Lobban Cord, the founder of the Cord Corporation, which also ran Cord Automobile.

Cord died on July 28, 2022 at the age of 82 in Sun Valley, Idaho.

== Racing record ==
=== Complete 24 Hours of Le Mans results ===
Year	Team	Co-Drivers	Car	Class	Laps	Pos.	Class Pos.
1978	(Germany) Porsche Kremer Racing	(United States) Jim Busby (United States) Rick Knoop	Porsche 935/77A	5 SP	337	6th	**1st**

=== Complete 24 Hours of Daytona results ===
Year	Team	Co-Drivers	Car	Class	Laps	Pos.	Class Pos.
1976	(United States) Ken Starbird	(United States) Jim Adams (United States) Milt Minter	Ferrari 365 GTB/4	GTO	500	6th	6th
1978	(United States) Chris Cord Racing	(United States) Jim Adams	Chevrolet Monza	GTX	261	DNF	DNF
1980	(United States) Chris Cord Racing	(United States) Jim Adams	Chevrolet Monza	GTX	188	DNF	DNF
1981	(United States) Chris Cord Racing	(United States) Jim Adams	Chevrolet Monza	GTX	191	DNF	DNF
1984	(United States) All American Racers	(United States) Jim Adams	Toyota Celica	GTU	292	DNF	DNF
1985	(United States) All American Racers	(United States) Dennis Aase	Toyota Celica	GTU	533	19th	**3rd**
1986	(United States) All American Racers	(United States) Dennis Aase	Toyota Celica	GTO	489	16th	5th
1987	(United States) All American Racers	(New Zealand) Steve Millen	Toyota Celica Turbo	GTO	681	8th	**2nd**
1988	(United States) All American Racers	(United States) Dennis Aase (New Zealand) Steve Millen	Toyota Celica Turbo	GTO	416	DNF	DNF
1989	(United States) All American Racers	(United States) Steve Bren (United States) Drake Olson	Toyota 88C	GTP	180	DNF	DNF
1991	(United States) Hotchkis Racing	(United States) Jim Adams (United States) Rob Dyson (United States) John Hotchkis	Porsche 962	GTP	692	**3rd**	**2nd**
1993	(United States) Hotchkis Racing	(United States) Jim Adams (United States) Robert Kirby	Porsche 962	GTP	162	DNF	DNF

=== International Race of Champions ===
(key) (Bold – Pole position. * – Most laps led.)

International Race of Champions results
Year	Make	1	2	3	4	Pos.	Pts	Ref
1988	Chevrolet	DAY; 9	RSD; 7	MCH	GLN; 6	10th	26	
