= 1988 IMSA GT Championship =

18th season of the racing series organized by IMSA

Seasons
- ← 1987 1989 →

The 1988 Camel GT Championship season was the 18th season of the IMSA GT Championship auto racing series. It was for GTP and Lights classes of prototypes, as well as Grand Tourer-style racing cars which ran in the GTO and GTU classes. It began January 30, 1988, and ended October 23, 1988, after seventeen rounds.

== Schedule ==
The GT and Prototype classes did not participate in all events, nor did they race together at shorter events. Races marked as GT featured both GTO and GTU classes combined. Races marked with All had all classes on track at the same time.

Rnd	Race	Length	Class	Circuit	Date
1	SunBank 24 at Daytona	24 Hours	All	Daytona International Speedway	January 30; January 31
2	Grand Prix of Miami	3 Hours	Proto	Streets of Miami	February 28
2	Grand Prix of Miami	40 Minutes	GTU	Streets of Miami	February 28
3	Coca-Cola 12 Hours of Sebring	12 Hours	All	Sebring International Raceway	March 19
4	Atlanta Journal-Constitution Grand Prix	500 km	Proto	Road Atlanta	April 10
5	Grand Prix of Palm Beach	3 Hours	Proto	West Palm Beach Street Circuit	April 24
5	Grand Prix of Palm Beach	1 Hour	GTO	West Palm Beach Street Circuit	April 24
6	Mid-Atlantic Toyota Grand Prix	3 Hours	GT	Summit Point Raceway	May 22
7	Lime Rock Grand Prix	150 Laps	Proto	Lime Rock Park	May 30
8	Nissan Grand Prix of Ohio	500 km	Proto	Mid-Ohio Sports Car Course	June 5
8	Nissan Grand Prix of Ohio	200 km	GT	Mid-Ohio Sports Car Course	June 5
9	Camel Continental	500 km	Proto	Watkins Glen International	July 3
10	Miller High Life 500	500 km	All	Road America	July 17
11	G.I. Joe's Grand Prix	1 Hour 30 Minutes	GT	Portland International Raceway	July 31
11	G.I. Joe's Grand Prix	300 km	Proto	Portland International Raceway	July 31
12	Lincoln-Mercury California Grand Prix	200 km	GT	Sears Point Raceway	August 14
12	Lincoln-Mercury California Grand Prix	300 km	Proto	Sears Point Raceway	August 14
13	Nissan Camel Grand Prix of San Antonio	3 Hours	Proto	San Antonio Street Circuit	September 4
14	Lime Rock 2 Hours	90 Laps	GTO	Lime Rock Park	September 5
14	Lime Rock 2 Hours	50 Laps	GTU	Lime Rock Park	September 5
15	Kodak Copier 500	500 km	GT	Watkins Glen International	September 25
16	Columbus Ford Dealers 500	300 km	Proto	Columbus Street Circuit	October 2
16	Columbus Ford Dealers 500	45 Minutes	GT	Columbus Street Circuit	October 2
17	Camel Grand Prix of Southern California	45 Minutes	GTU	Del Mar Fairgrounds	October 22
17	Camel Grand Prix of Southern California	1 Hour	GTO	Del Mar Fairgrounds	October 22
17	Camel Grand Prix of Southern California	2 Hours	Proto	Del Mar Fairgrounds	October 22

== Season results ==
Rnd	Circuit	GTP Winning Team	Lights Winning Team	GTO Winning Team	GTU Winning Team	Results
Rnd	Circuit	GTP Winning Drivers	Lights Winning Drivers	GTO Winning Drivers	GTU Winning Drivers	Results
1	Daytona	(United Kingdom) #60 Castrol Jaguar	(United States) #9 Essex Racing	(United States) #11 Roush Racing	(United States) #71 Team Highball	Results
1	Daytona	(United Kingdom) Martin Brundle (Brazil) Raul Boesel (Denmark) John Nielsen	(United States) David Simpson (United States) David Loring (United States) Tom Hessert	(United States) Pete Halsmer (United States) Scott Pruett (United States) Bob Akin (United States) Paul Miller	(United States) Bob Lazier (United States) Amos Johnson (United States) Dennis Shaw	Results
2	Miami	(United States) #16 Dyson Racing	(United States) #80 Gaston Andrey Racing	Did Not Participate	(United States) #1 C&C Inc.	Results
2	Miami	(United States) Price Cobb (United Kingdom) James Weaver	(Italy) Martino Finotto (Italy) Ruggero Melgrati		(United States) Tommy Kendall	Results
3	Sebring	(United States) #86 Bayside Disposal	(United States) #9 Essex Racing	(United States) #5 Protofab Racing	(United States) #71 Team Highball	Results
3	Sebring	(West Germany) Hans-Joachim Stuck (West Germany) Klaus Ludwig	(United States) David Loring (United States) Tom Hessert	(United States) Wally Dallenbach Jr. (Canada) John Jones	(United States) Amos Johnson (United States) Dennis Shaw	Results
4	Road Atlanta	(United States) #3 Electramotive Eng.	(United States) #80 Gaston Andrey Racing	Did Not Participate	Did Not Participate	Results
4	Road Atlanta	(United States) John Morton (Australia) Geoff Brabham	(Italy) Martino Finotto (Italy) Ruggero Melgrati			Results
5	Palm Beach	(United States) #83 Electramotive Eng.	(United States) #9 Essex Racing	(United States) #6 Roush Racing	Did Not Participate	Results
5	Palm Beach	(United States) John Morton (Australia) Geoff Brabham	(United States) David Loring (United States) Tom Hessert	(United States) Pete Halsmer		Results
6	Summit Point	Did Not Participate	Did Not Participate	(United States) #11 Roush Racing	(United States) #1 C&C Inc.	Results
6	Summit Point			(United States) Scott Pruett	(United States) Tommy Kendall	Results
7	Lime Rock	(United States) #83 Electramotive Eng.	(United States) #79 Whitehall Motorsports	Did Not Participate	Did Not Participate	Results
7	Lime Rock	(Australia) Geoff Brabham	(United States) Skeeter McKitterick			Results
8	Mid-Ohio	(United States) #83 Electramotive Eng.	(United Kingdom) #01 Spice Engineering	(United States) #98 All American Racers	(United States) #1 C&C Inc.	Results
8	Mid-Ohio	(United States) Tom Gloy (Australia) Geoff Brabham	(United States) Charles Morgan (United States) Dominic Dobson	(United States) Chris Cord	(United States) Tommy Kendall	Results
9	Watkins Glen	(United States) #83 Electramotive Eng.	(United States) #79 Winters	Did Not Participate	Did Not Participate	Results
9	Watkins Glen	(United States) John Morton (Australia) Geoff Brabham	(United States) Skeeter McKitterick (Greece) Costas Los			Results
10	Road America	(United States) #83 Electromotive Eng.	(United States) #55 Huffaker Racing	(United States) #98 All American Racers	(United States) #07 Full Time Racing	Results
10	Road America	(United States) John Morton (Australia) Geoff Brabham	(United States) Terry Visger (United States) Dan Marvin	(United States) Dennis Aase	(United States) Dorsey Schroeder	Results
11	Portland	(United States) #83 Electramotive Eng.	(United Kingdom) #01 Spice Engineering	(United States) #6 Roush Racing	(United States) #02 C&C Inc.	Results
11	Portland	(Australia) Geoff Brabham	(United States) Charles Morgan	(United States) Pete Halsmer	(United States) Max Jones	Results
12	Sears Point	(United States) #83 Electramotive Eng.	(United States) #55 AC Delco Pontiac	(United States) #99 All American Racers	(United States) #07 Full Time Racing	Results
12	Sears Point	(Australia) Geoff Brabham	(United States) Dan Marvin	(United States) Willy T. Ribbs	(United States) Dorsey Schroeder	Results
13	San Antonio	(United States) #16 Dyson Racing	(United States) #55 Huffaker Racing	Did Not Participate	Did Not Participate	Results
13	San Antonio	(United States) Price Cobb (United Kingdom) James Weaver	(United States) Dan Marvin (United States) Bob Lobenberg			Results
14	Lime Rock	Did Not Participate	Did Not Participate	(United States) #5 Protofab Racing	(United States) #07 Full Time Racing	Results
14	Lime Rock			(United States) Wally Dallenbach Jr.	(United States) Dorsey Schroeder	Results
15	Watkins Glen	Did Not Participate	Did Not Participate	(United States) #98 All American Racers	(United States) #1 C&C Inc.	Results
15	Watkins Glen			(United States) Chris Cord (United States) Dennis Aase	(United States) Tommy Kendall	Results
16	Columbus	(United States) #83 Electramotive Eng.	(United States) #9 Essex Racing	(United States) #16 Hoerr Racing	(United States) #1 C&C Inc.	Results
16	Columbus	(Australia) Geoff Brabham	(United States) David Loring (United States) Tom Hessert	(United States) Irv Hoerr	(United States) Tommy Kendall	Results
17	Del Mar	(United Kingdom) #61 Castrol Jaguar	(United States) #55 Huffaker Racing	(United States) #99 All American Racers	(United States) #1 C&C Inc.	Results
17	Del Mar	(United Kingdom) Martin Brundle (Netherlands) Jan Lammers	(United States) Dan Marvin	(United States) Willy T. Ribbs	(United States) Tommy Kendall	Results

== Championship results ==
The GTP Drivers Championship was won by Australian Geoff Brabham, driving a Nissan GTP ZX-T.
