= 1987 IMSA GT Championship =

17th season of the racing series organized by IMSA

Seasons
- ← 1986 1988 →

The 1987 Camel GT Championship season was the 17th season of the IMSA GT Championship auto racing series. It was for GTP and Lights classes of prototypes, as well as Grand Tourer-style racing cars which ran in the GTO and GTU classes. It began January 31, 1987, and ended October 25, 1987, after 21 rounds.

== Schedule ==
The GT and Prototype classes did not participate in all events, nor did they race together at shorter events. Races marked as GT featured both GTO and GTU classes combined. Races marked with All had all classes on track at the same time.

Rnd	Race	Length	Class	Circuit	Date
1	SunBank 24 at Daytona	24 Hours	All	Daytona International Speedway	January 31; February 1
2	Grand Prix of Miami	3 Hours	Proto	Streets of Miami	March 1
2	Grand Prix of Miami	45 Minutes	GT	Streets of Miami	March 1
3	12 Hours of Sebring	12 Hours	All	Sebring International Raceway	March 21
4	Atlanta Journal-Constitution Grand Prix	500 km	Proto	Road Atlanta	April 12
5	Los Angeles Times Grand Prix	300 km	GT	Riverside International Raceway	April 26
5	Los Angeles Times Grand Prix	500 km	Proto	Riverside International Raceway	April 26
6	Nissan Monterey Triple Crown	300 km	GT	Laguna Seca Raceway	May 2
6	Nissan Monterey Triple Crown	300 km	Proto	Laguna Seca Raceway	May 3
7	Arizona 300	300 km	GT	Firebird International Raceway	May 17
8	Lime Rock Grand Prix	150 Laps	Proto	Lime Rock Park	May 24
9	Champion Spark Plug Grand Prix	250 km	GT	Mid-Ohio Sports Car Course	June 7
9	Champion Spark Plug Grand Prix	500 km	Proto	Mid-Ohio Sports Car Course	June 7
10	Grand Prix of Palm Beach	2 Hours	GTO	West Palm Beach Street Circuit	June 20
10	Grand Prix of Palm Beach	45 Minutes	GTU	West Palm Beach Street Circuit	June 21
10	Grand Prix of Palm Beach	3 Hours	Proto	West Palm Beach Street Circuit	June 21
11	Kuppenheimer GT Challenge	300 km	GT	Road Atlanta	June 28
12	Camel Continental	500 km	Proto	Watkins Glen International	July 5
13	Mid-Atlantic Toyota Grand Prix	300 km	GT	Summit Point Raceway	July 12
14	G.I. Joe's Grand Prix	300 km	Proto	Portland International Raceway	July 26
14	G.I. Joe's Grand Prix	300 km	GT	Portland International Raceway	July 27
15	Ford California Grand Prix	300 km	GT	Sears Point Raceway	August 1
15	Ford California Grand Prix	300 km	Proto	Sears Point Raceway	August 2
16	Löwenbräu Classic	500 miles	All	Road America	August 16
17	Nissan Grand Prix of San Antonio	3 Hours	Proto	San Antonio Street Circuit	September 6
18	150 Lap Lime Rock	150 Laps	GT	Lime Rock Park	September 7
19	Kodak Copier 500	500 km	GT	Watkins Glen International	September 27
20	Columbus Ford Dealers 500	300 km	Proto	Columbus Street Circuit	October 4
20	Columbus Ford Dealers 500	45 Minutes	GT	Columbus Street Circuit	October 4
21	Camel Grand Prix of Southern California	1 Hour	GTO	Del Mar Fairgrounds	October 24
21	Camel Grand Prix of Southern California	2 Hours	Proto	Del Mar Fairgrounds	October 25
21	Camel Grand Prix of Southern California	45 Minutes	GTU	Del Mar Fairgrounds	October 25

== Season results ==
Rnd	Circuit	GTP Winning Team	Lights Winning Team	GTO Winning Team	GTU Winning Team	Results
Rnd	Circuit	GTP Winning Drivers	Lights Winning Drivers	GTO Winning Drivers	GTU Winning Drivers	Results
1	Daytona	(United States) #14 Holbert Racing	(United Kingdom) #01 AT&T Spice	(United States) #11 Roush Racing	(United States) #71 Team Highball	Results
1	Daytona	(United States) Al Holbert (United States) Chip Robinson (United States) Al Unser Jr. (United Kingdom) Derek Bell	(United States) Bob Earl (United States) Jeff Kline (United States) Don Bell	(United States) Bill Elliott (United States) Scott Pruett (United States) Lyn St. James (United States) Tom Gloy	(United States) Bob Lazier (United States) Amos Johnson (United States) Dennis Shaw	Results
2	Miami	(United States) #83 Electramotive Eng.	(United States) #42 White-Allen	(United States) #4 Dingman Bros.	(United States) #12 Aspen Inn	Results
2	Miami	(United States) Elliot Forbes-Robinson (Australia) Geoff Brabham	(United States) Chip Mead (Canada) Charles Monk	(United States) Bob Earl	(United States) John Finger	Results
3	Sebring	(United States) #86 Bayside Disposal	(United States) #42 White-Allen	(United States) #28 Protofab Racing	(United States) #17 Al Bacon Racing	Results
3	Sebring	(West Germany) Jochen Mass (United States) Bobby Rahal	(United States) John Higgins (United States) Howard Cherry (Canada) Charles Monk	(United States) Greg Pickett (United States) Tommy Riggins	(United States) Al Bacon (United States) Bob Reed	Results
4	Road Atlanta	(United States) #16 Dyson Racing	(United Kingdom) #01 Collins & Aikman	Did Not Participate	Did Not Participate	Results
4	Road Atlanta	(United States) Price Cobb (United Kingdom) James Weaver	(United States) Don Bell (United States) Jeff Kline			Results
5	Riverside	(United States) #44 Group 44	(United Kingdom) #01 Collins & Aikman	(United States) #98 All American Racers Dennis Aase	(United States) #71 Team Highball	Results
5	Riverside	(United States) Hurley Haywood (United States) John Morton	(United States) Don Bell (United States) Jeff Kline	(United States) Chris Cord	(United States) Amos Johnson	Results
6	Laguna Seca	(United States) #85 Bayside Disposal	(United Kingdom) #01 Collins & Aikman	(United States) #98 All American Racers Dennis Aase	(United States) #75 Clayton Cunningham	Results
6	Laguna Seca	(West Germany) Klaus Ludwig	(United States) Don Bell	(United States) Chris Cord	(United States) Tommy Kendall	Results
7	Firebird	Did Not Participate	Did Not Participate	(United States) #76 Peerless-Hendrick	(United States) #75 Clayton Cunningham	Results
7	Firebird			(United States) Jack Baldwin	(United States) Tommy Kendall	Results
8	Lime Rock	(United States) #1 Holbert Racing	(United States) #70 Z&W Motorsports	Did Not Participate	Did Not Participate	Results
8	Lime Rock	(United States) Al Holbert	(United States) David Loring			Results
9	Mid-Ohio	(United States) #86 Bayside Disposal	(United Kingdom) #01 Collins & Aikman	(United States) #99 All American Racers	(United States) #55 Huffaker Racing	Results
9	Mid-Ohio	(West Germany) Jochen Mass (United States) Bobby Rahal	(United States) Don Bell (United States) Jeff Kline	(United States) Willy T. Ribbs	(United States) Terry Visger	Results
10	Palm Beach	(United States) #44 Group 44	(United States) #42 White-Allen	(United States) #22 Roush Racing	(United States) #55 Huffaker Racing	Results
10	Palm Beach	(United States) Hurley Haywood (United States) John Morton	(United States) Chip Mead (United States) Howard Cherry	(United States) Tom Gloy	(United States) Terry Visger	Results
11	Road Atlanta	Did Not Participate	Did Not Participate	(United States) #99 All American Racers	(United States) #55 Huffaker Racing	Results
11	Road Atlanta			(United States) Willy T. Ribbs	(United States) Terry Visger	Results
12	Watkins Glen	(United States) #16 Dyson Racing	(United States) #09 Ball Bros.	Did Not Participate	Did Not Participate	Results
12	Watkins Glen	(United States) Price Cobb (Australia) Vern Schuppan	(United States) Steve Durst (United States) Mike Brockman			Results
13	Summit Point	Did Not Participate	Did Not Participate	(United States) #99 All American Racers	(United States) #71 Team Highball	Results
13	Summit Point			(United States) Willy T. Ribbs	(United States) Amos Johnson	Results
14	Portland	(United States) #14 Holbert Racing	(United States) #63 Certified Brakes	(United States) #98 All American Racers Dennis Aase	(United States) #55 Huffaker Racing	Results
14	Portland	(United States) Chip Robinson	(United States) Jim Downing	(United States) Chris Cord	(United States) Terry Visger	Results
15	Sears Point	(United States) #86 Bayside Disposal	(United States) #43 White-Allen	(United States) #76 Peerless-Hendrick	(United States) #55 Huffaker Racing	Results
15	Sears Point	(West Germany) Jochen Mass	(United States) Chip Mead	(United States) Jack Baldwin	(United States) Terry Visger	Results
16	Road America	(United States) #16 Dyson Racing	(United Kingdom) #6 Spice Engineering	(United States) #28 Mobil 1 Mid-America	(United States) #75 Clayton Cunningham	Results
16	Road America	(United States) Price Cobb (United Kingdom) Johnny Dumfries	(United States) Jim Rothbarth (United States) Charles Morgan	(United States) Paul Dallenbach (United States) Chris Kneifel	(United States) Tommy Kendall	Results
17	San Antonio	(United States) #14 Holbert Racing	(United Kingdom) #01 Spice Engineering	Did Not Participate	Did Not Participate	Results
17	San Antonio	(United States) Al Holbert (United States) Chip Robinson (United Kingdom) Derek Bell	(United States) Don Bell (United States) Jeff Kline			Results
18	Lime Rock	Did Not Participate	Did Not Participate	(United States) #4 Dingman Bros.	(United States) #75 Clayton Cunningham	Results
18	Lime Rock			(United States) Bob Earl	(United States) Tommy Kendall	Results
19	Watkins Glen	Did Not Participate	Did Not Participate	(United States) #99 All American Racers	(United States) #71 Team Highball	Results
19	Watkins Glen			(United States) Willy T. Ribbs	(United States) Amos Johnson	Results
20	Columbus	(United States) #86 Bayside Disposal	(United Kingdom) #6 Spice Engineering	(United States) #76 Peerless-Hendrick	(United States) #75 Clayton Cunningham	Results
20	Columbus	(United States) Bobby Rahal	(United States) Charles Morgan	(United States) Jack Baldwin	(United States) Tommy Kendall	Results
21	Del Mar	(United States) #85 Bayside Disposal	(United Kingdom) #6 Spice Engineering	(United States) #98 All American Racers Dennis Aase	(United States) #55 Huffaker Racing	Results
21	Del Mar	(West Germany) Jochen Mass	(United States) Jim Rothbarth (United States) Charles Morgan	(United States) Chris Cord	(United States) Terry Visger	Results
