= Dennis Aase =

American racing driver (1942–2023)

- Nationality: American
- Born: Dennis Aase; February 23, 1942 Orange, California, U.S.
- Died: February 28, 2023 (aged 81)

Grand American Road Racing Championship
- Years active: 1
- Car number: 21
- Former teams: Aasco Performance
- Starts: 1
- Championships: 0
- Wins: 0
- Podiums: 0
- Poles: 0

Dennis Aase (February 23, 1942 – February 28, 2023) was an American race car driver, a member of the All American Racers team. Between 1978 and 1988, he regularly placed in the top-ten of the IMSA circuit.

== Racing career ==
=== 1970s ===
Aase started his racing career in 1973, participating in two different class races in the American Road Race of Champions for Don Burns Racing, finishing fifth and 11th respectively. The following year, in 1974, Aase entered the 1974 Watkins Glen 6 Hours with Scooter Patrick, driving for himself. He also entered the Mexico 1000 kilometers in a Porsche 911 S, alongside Adrian Gang, finishing 9th overall. Aase also joined the 1974 American-Canadian Challenge Cup, driving a Porsche in the four races. He finished 8th in the overall standings.

In 1977, Aase raced in the 1977 24 Hours of Le Mans, driving the No. 77 Wynn's International Porsche along with drivers Bob Kirby and John Hotchkis. After qualifying 50th, the group would complete 247 laps, finishing 7th in their class and 20th overall. This would be the only time that Aase would participate in the 24 Hours of Le Mans.

Aase, Kirby, Hotchkis, and Wynn's International would team up again in 1978, racing three races in the World Challenge for Endurance Drivers Series, but did not run for points. The following year, Aase would again race in the World Challenge for Endurance Drivers Series, this time racing for Koll Motor Sports alongside driver Alan Johnson. This time, Aase's team would run for points and ended up finishing 61st overall.

=== 1980s ===
Aase would again race in the World Challenge for Endurance Drivers Series in 1980, driving for Alan Johnson. Aase would race in three races and would finish 123rd in the overall standings, tied in the points with nine different drivers. In 1980, Aase also entered six races in the IMSA GTU Championship Series, where he would get three podium finishes, finishing tenth in the overall standings. In 1981, Aase would enter the World Challenge for Endurance Drivers Series for the final time, driving a Porsche Carrera in three races for Kendall Racing, finishing 74th in the standings at the end of the year.

Aase would move over to IMSA in 1982 with Kendall Racing where he would finish the season tenth in points with three poles, three podiums, and a win. The year after, Aase would change teams again, this time driving a Toyota Celica for the All American Racers. Despite having five poles and a win throughout the season, he would finish 36th in the standings. Over the next seven years, Aase would race for the All American Racers, eventually ending his IMSA career in 1989 with seven wins, sixteen podiums, and four poles.

=== Post-IMSA ===
After leaving IMSA, Aase would not race until entering two races in the SCCA World Challenge for AASCO Performance in 1996. He would finish 34 in the overall standings at the end of the year.

Four years later, Aase would enter the 2000 Bosch Sports Car Summerfest at the Glen in the Grand American Sports Car Series, driving a Porsche 911 for AASCO Performance with drivers Bobby Oneglia and Andy Hajducky. The team would finish 39th overall, 17th in their class after not finishing the race after spinning on lap 104.

In 2006, Aase would drive the Toyota Celica he raced in 1987 during the 2006 Goodwood Festival of Speed.

Aase died on February 28, 2023, aged 81.

== Motorsports career results ==
=== 24 Hours of Le Mans results ===
Year	Team	Co-Drivers	Car	Class	Laps	Pos.	Class Pos.
1977	(Belgium) Wynn's International	(United States) Bob Kirby (United States) John Hotchkis	Porsche 911 Carrera RSR	IMSA	247	20th	6th
