= Doc Bundy =

American race car driver (born 1946)

- Nationality: American
- Born: Harry E. Bundy; January 25, 1946 (age 80) Scio, Ohio, U.S.

Championship titles
- IMSA Bridgestone Supercar Championship (1992/Lotus Esprit X180R)

24 Hours of Le Mans career
- Years: 1982, 1984, 1987, 1997-1998
- Class wins: 1 (1984/IMSA GTO)

Harry E. "Doc" Bundy (born January 25, 1946) from Scio, Ohio, is an American former race car driver who competed in IMSA (International Motor Sports Association), 24 Hours of Le Mans, NASCAR Rolex Grand-Am Sports Car Series, American Le Mans Series, USRRC, and SCCA World Challenge.

== Race History ==
Bundy's motorsports career began as a wheel polisher and technician for Porsche driver Peter Gregg in 1973. The following year, he moved to Al Holbert Racing, where he spent the next five years preparing cars. In 1980, Bundy began driving for Holbert Racing in a Porsche 924, capturing a National Championship as a rookie. He followed that by driving a Porsche 924 Turbo and took a class win in the GTO Category at the 24 Hours of Le Mans. Over the next few years, he would drive for Lotus, Jaguar, Ford, and Chevrolet (Corvette), topped with a season racing a Porsche 962. Bundy shared driving duties in the Hendrick Motorsports IMSA Chevrolet Corvette GTP with Sarel van der Merwe from 1986 through the 1988 season when Hendrick abandoned the Corvette project. He was involved in a serious crash with Lyn St. James and Chip Robinson at the 1986 Riverside Grand Prix.

In 1982, Bundy raced and won SCCA TransAm competition, in GTP driving the well-known group 44 Jaguar, in GTO with a Mustang, GTP Corvette, Showroom Stock, and has won Road Atlanta and Miami in a Lotus X180R. In 1992, Bundy was crowned Bridgestone Supercar Champion.

In the early 1990s, Bundy drove the Esprit X180R for Lotus as the team's number one driver in IMSA's Bridgestone Supercar Championship, winning the Driver's Title and Manufacturer's Championship for Lotus in 1992. Lotus teammates Andy Pilgrim and David Murry featured prominently in the standings, with additional varied drivers that included Paul Newman.

Bundy drove in the 1997 24 Hours of Le Mans in a David Price Racing Panoz Esperante GTR-1. He currently drives Lotus Elite, Lotus 23B, and 1978–79 John Player Special (Car #1) for Regogo Racing Team.

== Retirement ==
After the collapse of the Bridgestone Supercar Championship, Bundy became a TV announcer. He continued to drive, instruct, consult, and act as a spokesperson for Lotus, Panoz, and Porsche. In 2011, he signed with Paul Rego at a vintage Lotus racing team named Regogo Racing as their driver in Regogo's first professional season. Bundy has become an award-winning driver for Regogo. An avid historic racer, Bundy drives a Lotus 23b, and Mario Andretti's 1979 John Player Speciall which Paul Rego purchased and restored in 2011. It made its debut at Barber Motorsports Park in 2012. Bundy has been driving for Regogo Racing since 2011 and continues to enjoy first-place finishes.

In January 2020, Bundy was hospitalized with COVID-19 and subsequently underwent heart surgery to repair damage caused by the virus.

== Racing record ==
=== IMSA Bridgestone Supercar Championship ===
Season	Team	Car	Poles	Wins	Podiums	Driver's Title Finishing	Championship Points
1991	LotuSport	Lotus Esprit X180R					
1992	LotuSport	Lotus Esprit X180R				1	
1993	LotuSport	Lotus Esprit X180R				2	162
1994	LotuSport	Lotus Esprit X180R					

=== 24 Hours of Le Mans ===
- 1982
- 1984
- 1987
- 1997
- 1998

=== SCCA National Championship Runoffs ===
Year	Track	Car	Engine	Class	Finish	Start	Status
1980	Road Atlanta	Porsche 924	Porsche	D Production	1	1	Running
1981	Road Atlanta	Porsche 924	Porsche	D Production	2	1	Running
