= Drake Olson =

American racing driver

Herbert Drake Olson (born April 5, 1955) is an American former racing driver from Bridgewater, Connecticut.

Olson made one CART World Series start in 1983 at Road America. In 1984, he drove in three Can-Am races, an IMSA GT Championship race and two World Endurance Championship races, including the 1984 24 Hours of Le Mans where he was caught up in the debris field of his Aston Martin teammate John Sheldon's crash that killed a track worker. In 1985, he won three races with Dyson Racing in IMSA Camel GTP, the team's first, in a Porsche 962. 1986 saw Olson continue in IMSA GTP with Dyson and Preston Henn fielding his entries. That year, he also competed in the 1986 24 Hours of Le Mans, co-driving a Rothmans Porsche factory 962 with Vern Schuppan. Olson was away from racing after that until 1989 when he returned with the All American Racers Toyota 88C factory team in IMSA GTP. He won two poles and finished ninth in points. 1990 would be his final year of professional racing, as he finished tenth in GTP points with three poles for All American Racers in their Eagle HF89.

After retiring from racing, Olson became a glacier pilot in Alaska, and appeared as such in 2012 in National Geographic Channel documentary show Alaska Wing Men.
