= 1977 IMSA GT Championship =

7th season of the racing series organized by IMSA

Seasons
- ← 1976 1978 →

The 1977 Camel GT Challenge season was the 7th season of the IMSA GT Championship auto racing series. The series was for GTO and GTU class Grand tourer racing cars. It began February 5, 1977, and ended October 26, 1977, after sixteen rounds.

== Schedule ==
Both classes did not participate together in some events. Races marked with Both had both classes on track at the same time.

Rnd	Race	Length	Class	Circuit	Date
1	24 Hours of Daytona	24 Hours	Both	Daytona International Speedway	February 5 February 6
2	12 Hours of Sebring	12 Hours	Both	Sebring International Raceway	March 19
3	WQXI Road Atlanta 100	100 mi (160 km)	Both	Road Atlanta	April 17
4	Monterey Triple Crown	100 mi (160 km)	Both	Laguna Seca Raceway	May 1
5	Mid-America 100	100 mi (160 km)	Both	Mid-America Raceway	May 15
6	Coca-Cola 350	100 mi (160 km)	Both	Lime Rock Park	May 30
7	Mid-Ohio Twin 200	100 mi (160 km)	Both	Mid-Ohio Sports Car Course	June 5
8	Pepsi Grand Prix	100 mi (160 km)	Both	Brainerd International Raceway	June 19
9	Paul Revere 250	250 mi (400 km)	Both	Daytona International Speedway	July 4
10	Hallett Grand Prix	1 Hour	GTU	Hallett Motor Racing Circuit	July 24
11	Sears Point Grand Prix	100 mi (160 km)	GTO	Sears Point International Raceway	July 31
11	Sears Point Grand Prix	75 mi (121 km)	GTU	Sears Point International Raceway	July 31
12	Pocono Carquest Twin Grand Prix	100 mi (160 km)	Both	Pocono International Raceway	August 14
13	Mid-Ohio Twin 3 Hours	3 Hours	Both	Mid-Ohio Sports Car Course	August 28
14	Labor Day Race	100 mi (160 km)	GTU	Road Atlanta	September 5
14	Labor Day Race	100 mi (160 km)	GTO	Road Atlanta	September 5
15	Shasta Monterey Grand Prix	100 mi (160 km)	Both	Laguna Seca Raceway	October 9
16	Daytona Finale 250	250 mi (400 km)	Both	Daytona International Speedway	October 26

== Season results ==
Rnd	Circuit	GTO Winning Team	GTU Winning Team	Results
Rnd	Circuit	GTO Winning Drivers	GTU Winning Drivers	Results
1	Daytona	#43 Ecurie Escargot	#42 Bob Hindson	Results
1	Daytona	(United States) Hurley Haywood (United States) John Graves (United States) Dave Helmick	(United States) Bob Hindson (United States) Frank Carney (United States) Dick Davenport	Results
2	Sebring	#30 George Dyer Racing	#50 Moltex Auto	Results
2	Sebring	(United States) George Dyer (United States) Brad Frisselle	(Canada) Gerhard Hirsch (Canada) Fritz Hochreuter (Canada) Rainer Brezinka	Results
3	Road Atlanta	#14 Dickinson/Holbert Racing	#33 Bob Sharp Racing	Results
3	Road Atlanta	(United States) Al Holbert	(United States) Sam Posey	Results
4	Laguna Seca	#0 Interscope Racing	#45 Porsche	Results
4	Laguna Seca	(United States) Danny Ongais	(United States) Walt Maas	Results
5	Mid-America	#14 Holbert Racing	#45 Porsche	Results
5	Mid-America	(United States) Al Holbert	(United States) Walt Maas	Results
6	Lime Rock	#14 Holbert Racing	#45 Porsche	Results
6	Lime Rock	(United States) Al Holbert	(United States) Walt Maas	Results
7	Mid-Ohio	#2 McLaren North America	#33 Bob Sharp Racing	Results
7	Mid-Ohio	(United Kingdom) David Hobbs	(United States) Sam Posey	Results
8	Brainerd	#00 Interscope Racing	#45 Porsche	Results
8	Brainerd	(United States) Danny Ongais	(United States) Walt Maas	Results
9	Daytona	#30 George Dyer	#33 Bob Sharp Racing	Results
9	Daytona	(United States) George Dyer	(United States) Sam Posey	Results
10	Hallett	Did Not Participate	#45 Porsche	Results
10	Hallett	Did Not Participate	(United States) Walt Maas	Results
11	Sears Point	#2 McLaren North America	#64 Porsche	Results
11	Sears Point	(United Kingdom) David Hobbs	(United States) Dennis Aase	Results
12	Pocono	#14 Holbert Racing	#45 Porsche	Results
12	Pocono	(United States) Al Holbert	(United States) Walt Maas	Results
13	Mid-Ohio^{A}	#95 Bob Hagestad	#45 Porsche	Results
13	Mid-Ohio^{A}	(United States) Hurley Haywood (United States) Bob Hagestad	(United States) Walt Maas	Results
14	Road Atlanta	#2 McLaren North America	#64 Porsche	Results
14	Road Atlanta	(United Kingdom) David Hobbs	(United States) Dennis Aase	Results
15	Laguna Seca	#2 McLaren North America	#45 Porsche	Results
15	Laguna Seca	(United Kingdom) David Hobbs	(United States) Walt Maas	Results
16	Daytona	#95 Bob Hagestad	#60 Porsche	Results
16	Daytona	(United States) Hurley Haywood	(United States) Rusty Bond (United States) Ren Tilton	Results

== Notes ==
- ^A The race was won overall by Peter Gregg in a Group 5 Porsche 935. Haywood and Hagestad finished 4th overall.
