= Randy Lanier =

American racing driver (born 1954)

- Born: 1954 (age 71–72); Lynchburg, Virginia, U.S.
- Criminal information
- Occupation: race car driver
- Children: 2
- Status: Released October 2014
- Motive: criminal enterprise
- Convictions: engaging in a Continuing Criminal Enterprise and conspiring to distribute more than 1,000 pounds of marijuana
- Penalty: life without parole
- Retired: 1988

CART
- Years active: 1985–1986
- Teams: Arciero Racing
- Starts: 18
- Best finish: 20th in 1986

Previous series
- 1981–1986: IMSA GT Championship

Championship titles
- 1984: 1

Awards
- 1986: Indianapolis 500 Rookie of the Year

24 Hours of Le Mans career
- Years: 1982
- Teams: NART/T-Bird Racing
- Best finish: 49th
- Class wins: 0

Randy Thomas Lanier (born 1954) is a convicted drug trafficker from the United States. He is also known for his car racing efforts in the mid-1980s, including winning the 1984 IMSA Camel GT title for the wholly independent Blue Thunder Racing team, and for being arrested for marijuana smuggling in 1988 to support his racing efforts.

== Personal life ==
Lanier was born in 1954 in Lynchburg, Virginia to a family of tobacco farmers. At age 13, he moved to Miami, Florida. When he was caught with an ounce of cannabis, he dropped out of high school to avoid suspension, later earning a GED. Lanier worked in construction to make a living.

In 1976, Lanier married his wife Pam. They had a daughter, Brandie in 1980 and a son Glen in 1987, who was named after Lanier's younger brother who was killed in a motorcycle accident at the age of 16. He has other siblings as well. The couple divorced in the mid-1980s in an attempt to protect their house and other property when they became fearful of the authorities catching up with Lanier's illegal activities.

In 1986, Lanier became romantically involved with Maria De La Luz Maggi, and she accompanied him during his time as a fugitive. In 1993, Maggi was convicted of money laundering, and by the time she was released from prison in 1999, the two were divorced.

Some time after his 2014 release from prison, Lanier moved in with his ex-wife, Pam, and the two are planning to marry. According to a 2021 Netflix documentary about Lanier, "Need For Weed", he is a brand ambassador for a medical marijuana company and plans to continue racing with them as a sponsor. In the documentary Pam claims that "Randy's release from prison is a true miracle. He got a presidential pardon.", when in fact Lanier did not receive a pardon; Lanier's release was based on a cooperation agreement with the prosecution.

== Motorsports career ==
Lanier began his motorsport career in 1978, following a meeting with the Sports Car Club of America at an auto show taking place in Miami Beach Convention Center on how to make a start in racing, he bought himself a 1957 Porsche 356 Speedster, where he used it to compete in E Production at the SCCA Southeast Regional Championship, eventually winning the class in 1980.

Lanier made his IMSA Camel GT series debut at the 1981 Daytona Finale, partnering with Dale Whittington, finishing 30th. The following season at the 24 Hours of Daytona, he was approached by a crew member for the North American Racing Team to fill in for Janet Guthrie, who was unable to race due to illness. Partnering with Bob Wollek and Edgar Dören, the trio ran in 3rd place for 18 hours until their run ended when Lanier took over at dawn on his first lap, considered by fellow driver Desiré Wilson to be unsuited to drive as he had been seen previously acting nervously in the pits, he drove the car off course destroying the suspension.

Lanier was invited by the same team to partner with Preston Henn and Denis Morin at the 24 Hours of Le Mans, retiring after they ran out of fuel. At Lanier's fifth race at the 6 Hours of Mosport, he brought an ex-works March 82G Chevrolet, scoring his first podium finish with a third, and then another at the Mid-Ohio 6 Hours.

In 1984, after driving for a variety of teams in the previous seasons, including a second place at the 24 Hours of Daytona, Lanier formed his own team, Blue Thunder Racing, with Bill Whittington and crew chief Keith Leyton consisting of two March GTPs.

Earlier in the season, Whittington led the season, allowing Lanier to take over after the Charlotte 500. With the help of Whittington, who taught Lanier how to set up the car, he took six wins, enough to score a driver's championship with one race to remain along with the Most Improved Driver award, despite having a lack of sponsorship and being a wholly independent team, unsupported by March Engineering. Another reason for his success was that the team employed the services of talented engine builder Ryan Falconer.

Lanier began to focus on his Indycar career, with the hope of winning the Indianapolis 500. He drove for Arciero Racing, intending to commit full-time for the 1986 season. For the following season, Lanier would also drive for Joest Racing for both the Daytona 24 Hours and Miami. After poor form in the previous year, Lanier would improve his form by finishing six of the nine races he entered including his 10th-place finish at the Indy 500, winning the Rookie of The Year honor and taking the fastest qualifying time for a rookie that year, an average of 209.964 MPH, beating the previous record set by Michael Andretti in 1984. His final race was at the Michigan 500 where he collided into a wall at 214 MPH following a tire blow out, breaking his right femur and shortly after this, he was arrested. Prior to that, he drove in 18 CART races in 1985 and 1986.

A year after his release from federal custody, Lanier returned to the track, coaching and racing with Rally Baby Racing, and the Road & Track teams in BMW E30s at the Mid-Ohio Sports Car Course in the American Endurance Racing series.

== Drug conviction and imprisonment ==
Lanier's presence in Florida during his youth has been suggested as a potential precursor to his later involvement in the drug trade.

Shortly after moving to Broward County, Lanier discovered cannabis at 14 when he began enjoying it recreationally. At 15, he began to sell drugs on the side. At the age of 20, he bought an $18,000 (equivalent to $91,000 in 2025) 27-foot-long (8.2 m) Magnum go-fast boat, for recreational use, with money he made as a marijuana dealer. Later as suggested by a friend, he took the opportunity to use this to smuggle a ton of marijuana out of the Bahamas and took this as an opportunity to make a small sideline to his personal water craft rental business.

Lanier later took on Ben Kramer, who raced in offshore powerboat racing, as a business partner. Together, their haul grew from a 65-foot (20 m) wooden trawler that was used to carry 18,000 pounds (8,200 kg) of drugs to a fleet of tugboats that was used to haul barges.

As Lanier defeated the heavily sponsored and factory supported oppositions of the Group 44 Racing Jaguar XJR-5 and Löwenbräu-sponsored Holbert Racing Porsche 962, the sudden racing successes began to raise questions about the team's source of finance and thus Lanier was under investigation from the FBI. (Note: Lanier claimed his source of financial aid came from his Blue Thunder fabrication shop in Davie and a former watersports rental company in Hollywood.) Lanier along with Eugene Fischer and Ben Kramer, owner of Apache boats; and twelve others ran a multi-million dollar drug empire between 1982 and 1986 when the arrest took place. Kramer was the great-nephew and one of the putative heirs of a top boss of the U.S. crime syndicate, Meyer Lansky.

A week prior to the Indy time trials, his former driving partner Bill Whittington was arrested and Lanier's name began to surface. Shortly after his Indy 500 drive, he made his largest haul of 165,000 lbs and had considered retiring from the drugs trade. Months after an Illinois dealer was arrested when a local state trooper discovered a small haul of cannabis in a broken down truck. Lanier's business partner and brother-in-law, Ronald Harris Ball, was arrested and denied bail.

Since many of these drugs were distributed in Illinois, Lanier's trial was conducted by Judge James L. Foreman in the Southern District of Illinois in January 1987. He was convicted of importing and distributing over 300 tons of Colombian marijuana, believed to be worth $68 million by prosecutors and was due to be sentenced when he disappeared.

Lanier was believed to have fled to Puerto Rico, but fled first to France, where he went into hiding in Monte Carlo, and later went into hiding in Antigua, where he kept properties, and was later arrested on October 26 whilst fishing. Lanier had also cut a deal after his arrest for conspiracy to distribute marijuana, but at the last minute refused to testify against Jack Kramer, father of Ben.

Lanier and his partner Ben Kramer received life without parole sentences on October 4, 1988 under the newly enacted Continuing Criminal Enterprise statute (also known as the "Super Drug Kingpin" law), owing to their refusal to cooperate with the prosecution. The Whittington brothers who were also involved received a lighter sentence. Lanier filed an appeal based on the fact that later RICO convictions were not nearly as lengthy, but lost the appeal. He was initially placed in Leavenworth Federal Penitentiary and was later transferred to the higher security United States Penitentiary I in Coleman. He spent his time in prison exercising, playing chess and answering letters sent by race fans.

Maggi, who married Lanier on August 31, 1990, at Oxford Federal Correctional Institution in Wisconsin., was sentenced on April 30, 1993, to nine years in prison for money laundering. She pleaded guilty in September the previous year to conspiracy and obstruction and later successfully appealed to have it reduced from 108 months to 97.

She was released in 1999: by that time she was no longer married to Lanier.

== Release from prison ==
Otherwise serving a life sentence, for reasons undisclosed under sealed motions, Lanier was scheduled to be released from prison, with a discharge date of October 15, 2014, which was reportedly confirmed to Autoweek magazine insiders by Jim Porter, first assistant U.S. Attorney for the Southern District of Illinois. The Federal Bureau of Prisons website also confirmed Lanier's date of discharge conditional to the requirement that he spend six months in a halfway house before entering a three-year period of supervised release where he would be disallowed alcohol and firearms. Lanier stated that he had a job awaiting him at a classic car museum in Florida, said to be for Preston Henn, owner of Fort Lauderdale Swap Shop. In 2019, Lanier's co-offender Ben Kramer sought to unseal the reasons for Lanier's release. The Court granted that application in part. It was acknowledged by the Court that Lanier was released due to Federal Rules of Criminal Procedure Rule 35 sentence reduction.

In 2015, Lanier took part in a race in Mid Ohio, driving for Rally Baby Racing, which was covered in-depth by Road & Track magazine.

== Motorsports career results ==
=== American open–wheel racing results ===
(key)

==== CART ====
Year	Team	Chassis	Engine	1	2	3	4	5	6	7	8	9	10	11	12	13	14	15	16	17	Rank	Points	Ref
1985	Arciero Racing	Lola T900	Cosworth DFX V8 t	LBH; 24	INDY; DNQ	MIL	POR; 22	MEA; 22	CLE; 20	MCH	ROA; 14	POC	MOH; 20	SAN	MCH	LAG; 13	PHX; 17	MIA; 15			41st	0	
1986	Arciero Racing	March 86C	Cosworth DFX V8 t	PHX; 11	LBH; 13	INDY; 10	MIL; 20	POR; 9	MEA; 6	CLE; 9	TOR; 21	MCH; 19	POC	MOH	SAN	MCH	ROA	LAG	PHX	MIA	20th	21	

==== Indianapolis 500 results ====
Year	Chassis	Engine	Car	Start	Qual	Rank	Finish	Laps	Led	Retired	Team
1985	Lola T900	Cosworth DFX	57	DNQ							Arciero Racing
1986	March 86C	Cosworth DFX	12	13	209.964	10	9	195	0	Flagged	Arciero Racing

Starts	1
Poles	0
Front Row	0
Best Start	13th
Wins	0
Top 5	0
Top 10	1
Retired	0
Laps Led	0
Races Led	0
Total Laps	195
Winnings	$103,438

=== Complete 24 Hours of Le Mans results ===
Year	Class	No	Tyres	Car	Team	Co-Drivers	Laps	Pos.	Class Pos.
1982	GTX	73	D	Ferrari 512BB/LM; Ferrari 4.9L Flat-12	(United States) NART/T-Bird Racing	(United States) Preston Henn (France) Denis Morin	43	49th	10th

=== Complete IMSA GT results ===
Year	Entrant	Class	Chassis	Engine	1	2	3	4	5	6	7	8	9	10	11	12	13	14	15	16	17	18	Rank	Points
1981	Whittington Bros.	GTX	Porsche 935 K3	Porsche 3.0L Turbo F6	DAY	SEB	ATL	LA	MON	LRO	MOH	BRN	DAY2	SEP	POR	MOS	RAM	ATL2	POC	DAY3; 30			76th	0
1982	North American Racing Team	GTP	Ferrari 512BB/LM	Ferrari 4.9L F12	DAY; Ret	SEB	ATL	LA	MON	CHR	MOH	LRO	DAY2	BRN	SEP	POR	MOS	RAM	MOH	ATL2	POC	DAY3	16th	42
1982	T-Bird Swap Shop	GTP	Porsche 935 K3	Porsche 3.0L Turbo F6	DAY	SEB; Ret	ATL	LA	MON	CHR; Ret	MOH	LRO	DAY2	BRN	SEP	POR	MOS	RAM	MOH	ATL2	POC	DAY3	16th	42
1982	March Racing	GTP	March 83G	Chevrolet 5.7L V8	DAY	SEB	ATL	LA	MON	CHR	MOH	LRO	DAY2	BRN	SEP	POR	MOS; 3	RAM; 6	MOH; 3	ATL2; Ret	POC; Ret	DAY3	16th	42
1983	Motorsports Marketing	GTP	March 83G	Chevrolet 5.7L V8	DAY; 2	MGP	SEB	ATL	LA	MON	CHR; Ret	LRO	MOH	DAY2	BRN	SEP	POR	MOS; Ret	RAM	POC	DAY3		28th	23
1983	Marty Hinze	GTP	March 82G	Chevrolet 5.7L V8	DAY	MGP	SEB; Ret	ATL	LA	MON	CHR	LRO	MOH	DAY2	BRN	SEP	POR	MOS	RAM; Ret	POC	DAY3		28th	23
1983	Marty Hinze	GTP	Porsche 935 K3	Porsche 3.0L Turbo F6	DAY	MGP	SEB	ATL	LA	MON	CHR	LRO	MOH	DAY2	BRN	SEP	POR	MOS	RAM	POC	DAY3; Ret		28th	23
1984	Blue Thunder Racing Team	GTP	March 83G	Chevrolet 5.7L V8	DAY; Ret	MGP; DNS	SEB; 2	ATL; 2	LA	MON	CHR	LRO	MOH	WAT	POR	SEP	RAM	POC	MIH	WAT2	DAY2		1st	189
1984	Blue Thunder Racing Team	GTP	March 84G	Chevrolet 5.7L V8	DAY	MGP	SEB	ATL	LA; 1	MON; 1	CHR; 1	LRO; 2	MOH; 2	WAT; Ret	POR; 1	SEP; 7	RAM; 3	POC; 5	MIH; 1	WAT2; 1	DAY2; Ret		1st	189
1985	Leon Brothers Racing	GTP	March 85G	Porsche 3.0L Turbo F6	DAY; Ret	MGP	SEB	ATL	LA	MON	CHR	LRO	MOH	WAT	POR	SEP	RAM; 6	POC	WAT2	COL	DAY2		27th	18
1985	Blue Thunder Racing Team	GTP	March 84G	Chevrolet 5.7L V8	DAY	MGP	SEB; 7	ATL	LA	MON	CHR	LRO	MOH	WAT	POR	SEP	RAM	POC	WAT2	COL	DAY2; 5		27th	18
1986	Joest Racing	GTP	Porsche 962	Porsche 3.0 L Turbo Flat-6	DAY; Ret	MGP	SEB; Ret	ATL	LA	MON	CHR	LRO	MOH	PBE	WAT	POR	SEP	RAM	WAT2	COL	DAY2		63rd	0

== Bibliography ==
In 2021, a book written by Lanier with A. J. Baime about his past in drug smuggling and racing entitiled Survival of the Fastest: Weed, Speed and the 1980s Drug Scandal that Shocked the Sports World was released.

== Sources ==
Sporting positions
Preceded by Arie Luyendyk	Indianapolis 500; Rookie of the Year; 1986	Succeeded by Fabrizio Barbazza
Preceded by Al Holbert	IMSA GT champion 1984	Succeeded by Al Holbert
