= Portland Grand Prix =

- Venue: Portland International Raceway
- First race: 1978
- Last race: 2006
- Previous names: Rose City Grand Prix
- Most wins (driver): Al Holbert (3)
- Most wins (team): Holbert Racing (4)
- Most wins (manufacturer): Porsche (8)

The Portland Grand Prix was a sports car race held at the Portland International Raceway in Portland, Oregon from 1978 until 2006. It began as a round of the IMSA GT Championship, and became an American Le Mans Series race in 1999.

== Winners ==
Date	Overall winner(s)	Entrant	Car	Distance/Duration	Race title	Report
IMSA GT Championship
1978	(United States) Peter Gregg	(United States) Brumos Porsche	Porsche 935/77A	100 miles (160 km)	G.I. Joe's Grand Prix	report
1979	(United States) Peter Gregg	(United States) Peter Gregg Racing	Porsche 935/79	100 miles (160 km)	G.I. Joe's Grand Prix	report
1980	(United Kingdom) John Fitzpatrick	(United States) Dick Barbour Racing	Porsche 935 K3/80	100 miles (160 km)	G.I. Joe's Grand Prix	report
1981	(United Kingdom) Brian Redman	(United States) Kent Cooke/Wood Racing	Lola T600-Chevrolet	100 miles (160 km)	G.I. Joe's Grand Prix	report
1982	(United States) John Paul Jr.	(United States) JLP Racing	Porsche 935 JLP-4	100 miles (160 km)	G.I. Joe's Toyota Grand Prix	report
1983	(United States) Al Holbert	(United States) Holbert Racing	March 83G-Porsche	3 hours	G.I. Joe's Grand Prix	report
1984	(United States) Randy Lanier (United States) Bill Whittington	(United States) Blue Thunder Racing Team	March 84G-Chevrolet	3 hours	G.I. Joe's Grand Prix	report
1985	(United States) Al Holbert	(United States) Holbert Racing	Porsche 962	300 km (190 mi)	G.I. Joe's Grand Prix	report
1986	(United States) Al Holbert	(United States) Holbert Racing	Porsche 962	300 km (190 mi)	G.I. Joe's Grand Prix	report
1987	(United States) Chip Robinson	(United States) Holbert Racing	Porsche 962	300 km (190 mi)	G.I. Joe's Grand Prix	report
1988	(Australia) Geoff Brabham	(United States) Electramotive Engineering	Nissan GTP ZX-T	300 km (190 mi)	G.I. Joe's Camel Grand Prix	report
1989	(Netherlands) Jan Lammers (United States) Price Cobb	(United Kingdom) Castrol Jaguar Racing	Jaguar XJR-10	300 km (190 mi)	G.I. Joe's Camel Grand Prix	report
1990	(United States) Davy Jones	(United Kingdom) Castrol Jaguar Racing	Jaguar XJR-10	300 km (190 mi)	G.I. Joe's Camel Grand Prix	report
1991	(Argentina) Juan Manuel Fangio II	(United States) All American Racers	Eagle Mk III-Toyota	300 km (190 mi)	G.I. Joe's Camel Grand Prix presented by Nissan	report
1992	(United States) P. J. Jones	(United States) All American Racers	Eagle Mk III-Toyota	2 hours	G.I. Joe's Camel Grand Prix presented by Nissan	report
1993	(Argentina) Juan Manuel Fangio II	(United States) All American Racers	Eagle Mk III-Toyota	1 hour, 45 minutes	G.I. Joe's/Camel Grand Prix	report
1994	(Canada) Jeremy Dale	(United States) Brix Racing	Spice HC94-Oldsmobile	2 hours	Grand Prix of Portland	report
1995 — 1998	Not held					
American Le Mans Series
1999	(France) Éric Bernard (Australia) David Brabham	(United States) Panoz Motor Sports	Panoz LMP-1 Roadster-S	2 hours, 45 minutes	Rose City Grand Prix	report
2000	(Italy) Rinaldo Capello (United Kingdom) Allan McNish	(Germany) Audi Sport North America	Audi R8	2 hours, 45 minutes	Decision Point Applications Rose City Grand Prix	report
2001	(Australia) David Brabham (Denmark) Jan Magnussen	(United States) Panoz Motor Sports	Panoz LMP-1 Roadster-S	2 hours, 45 minutes	Grand Prix of Portland	report
2002 — 2003	Not held					
2004	(Finland) JJ Lehto (Germany) Marco Werner	(United States) ADT Champion Racing	Audi R8	2 hours, 45 minutes	Portland Grand Prix	report
2005	(Germany) Frank Biela (Italy) Emanuele Pirro	(United States) ADT Champion Racing	Audi R8	2 hours, 45 minutes	Portland Grand Prix	report
2006	(Italy) Rinaldo Capello (United Kingdom) Allan McNish	(United States) Audi Sport North America	Audi R10 TDI	2 hours, 45 minutes	Tires Les Schwab presents Portland Grand Prix	report
