= Daytona Finale =

The Daytona Finale was a sports car race held at the infield road course of the Daytona International Speedway in Daytona Beach, Florida. The race was held from 1972 until 1986, and again in 1996, by the IMSA GT Championship. The race was revived in 2001 by the Grand American Road Racing Association.

== Results ==
Year	Drivers	Team	Car	Duration/Distance	Race title	Report
IMSA GT Championship
1972	(United States) Gene Felton	(United States) Gene Felton	Chevrolet Camaro	250 mi (400 km)	Presidential 250	report
1973	(United States) Peter Gregg (United States) Hurley Haywood	(United States) Peter Gregg	Porsche Carrera	250 mi (400 km)	Camel 250	report
1974	(United States) John Greenwood	(United States) John Greenwood Racing	Chevrolet Corvette	250 mi (400 km)	Daytona Finale	report
1975	(United States) John Greenwood	(United States) John Greenwood Racing	Chevrolet Corvette	250 mi (400 km)	Championship Finals	report
1976	(United States) Michael Keyser		Chevrolet Monza	250 mi (400 km)	Championship Finals	report
1977	(United States) Hurley Haywood	(United States) Bob Hagestad	Porsche 934	250 mi (400 km)	Daytona Finale 250	report
1978	(United States) Peter Gregg	(United States) Brumos Porsche	Porsche 935/77A	250 mi (400 km)	Camel GT 250	report
1979	(United States) Bill Whittington	(United States) Whittington Brothers Racing	Porsche 935 K3	220 mi (350 km)	Winston GT 250	report
1980	(Italy) Giampiero Moretti (West Germany) Reinhold Joest	(Italy) MOMO/Electrodyne	Porsche 935J	250 mi (400 km)	Championship Finals	report
1981	(United States) John Paul Jr.	(United States) JLP Racing	Porsche 935 JLP-3	250 mi (400 km)	IMSA National Championship Finale	report
1982	(United States) Ted Field (United States) Danny Ongais	(United States) Interscope Racing	Lola T600-Chevrolet	3 hours	Camel GT 3 Hours	report
1983	(United States) Al Holbert (United States) Jim Trueman	(United States) Holbert Racing	March 83G-Porsche	3 hours	Eastern Airlines 3 Hours of Daytona	report
1984	(United States) Al Holbert (United Kingdom) Derek Bell	(United States) Holbert Racing	Porsche 962	3 hours	Eastern Airlines 3 Hours of Daytona	report
1985	(United States) Al Holbert (United States) Al Unser Jr.	(United States) Holbert Racing	Porsche 962	3 hours	Eastern 3 Hours of Daytona	report
1986	(United States) Bob Tullius (United States) Chip Robinson	(United States) Group 44	Jaguar XJR-7	3 hours	Eastern 3 Hours of Daytona	report
1987 — 1995	Not held					
1996	(United States) John Paul Jr. (United States) Butch Leitzinger	(United States) Dyson Racing	Riley & Scott Mk III-Ford	3 hours	Daytona IMSA Finale	report
1997 — 2000	Not held					
Grand-Am
2001	(United Kingdom) James Weaver (United States) Butch Leitzinger	(United States) Dyson Racing	Riley & Scott Mk III-Ford	3 hours	Grand-Am Finale	report
2002	(United Kingdom) James Weaver (United States) Chris Dyson	(United States) Dyson Racing	Riley & Scott Mk III-Ford	3 hours	Dark Dog Grand American Finale	report
2003	(United States) Forest Barber (United States) Terry Borcheller	(United States) Bell Motorsports	Doran JE4-Chevrolet	3 hours	Grand American Champions Weekend	report
