= Grand Prix of Atlanta =

- Venue: Road Atlanta
- First race: 1970
- Last race: 2020
- Duration: 6 hours
- Previous names: Grand Prix of Road Atlanta
- Most wins (driver): Peter Gregg (6)
- Most wins (team): Brumos Racing (4)
- Most wins (manufacturer): Porsche (15)

The Grand Prix of Atlanta is a sports car race held at Road Atlanta in Braselton, Georgia. The first running was held in 1973, as part of the IMSA GT Championship. The race was held annually from 1973 until 1999, with separate spring and fall races held from 1976–1982. With the rise of the Petit Le Mans as Road Atlanta's marquee sports car event, the Grand Prix was held only sporadically in the American Le Mans Series era.

Atlanta Motor Speedway Roval, used in 1993

In 1993 only, the event was held on the combined road course at Atlanta Motor Speedway as Road Atlanta was going through a bankruptcy and sale.

In 2020 due to New York state restrictions for crowds because of COVID-19, the 6 Hours of Watkins Glen was moved to Road Atlanta.

== Winners ==
Date	Overall winner(s)	Team	Car	Distance/Duration	Race title	Report
IMSA GT Championship
Road Atlanta
1973	(United States) Peter Gregg	(United States) Peter Gregg	Porsche 911 Carrera	200 miles (320 km)	Camel 200	report
1974	(United States) Al Holbert (United States) Elliott Forbes-Robinson	(United States) Paris Properties	Porsche Carrera RSR	6 hours	6 Hours of Atlanta	report
1975	(United States) Peter Gregg	(United States) Brumos Porsche	Porsche Carrera RSR	100 miles (160 km)		report
1975	(United States) Al Holbert	(United States) Holbert's Porsche-Audi	Porsche Carrera RSR	100 miles (160 km)		report
1976 (spring)	(United States) Al Holbert	(United States) Dickinson/Holbert Racing	Chevy Monza	100 miles (160 km)		report
1976 (fall)	(United States) Al Holbert (United States) Jim Busby	(United States) Busby Racing	Chevy Monza	500 km (310 mi)	WZGC 93 FM Camel GT	report
1977 (spring)	(United States) Al Holbert	(United States) Holbert Racing	Chevy Monza	100 miles (160 km)	WQXI Camel GT Road Atlanta 100 Miles	report
1977 (fall)	(United Kingdom) David Hobbs	(United Kingdom) McLaren North America	BMW 320i Turbo	100 miles (160 km)	Labor Day Race	report
1978 (spring)	(United States) Peter Gregg	(United States) Brumos Porsche-Audi	Porsche 935	100 miles (160 km)	Camel GT Challenge	report
1978 (fall)	(United States) Peter Gregg	(United States) Brumos Porsche-Audi	Porsche 935	100 miles (160 km)	Arthur Montgomery 100 Camel GT Challenge	report
1979 (spring)	(United States) Peter Gregg	(United States) Brumos Porsche-Audi	Porsche 935/79	100 miles (160 km)		report
1979 (fall)	(United States) Peter Gregg	(United States) Peter Gregg Racing	Porsche 935/79	100 miles (160 km)		report
1980 (spring)	(United States) Bill Whittington	(United States) Whittington Brothers Racing	Porsche 935 K3	100 miles (160 km)		report
1980 (fall)	(United Kingdom) John Fitzpatrick	(United States) Dick Barbour Racing	Porsche 935 K3/80	50 miles (80 km)		report
1980 (fall)	(Italy) Giampiero Moretti	(Italy) Momo/Electrodyne	Porsche 935J	50 miles (80 km)		report
1981 (spring)	(United Kingdom) John Fitzpatrick	(United Kingdom) John Fitzpatrick Racing	Porsche 935 K3/80	100 miles (160 km)		report
1981 (fall)	(United Kingdom) Brian Redman	(United States) Cooke Woods Racing	Lola T600-Chevrolet	150 miles (80 km)		report
1982 (spring)	(United States) John Paul Jr.	(United States) JLP Racing	Porsche 935 JLP-3	150 miles (80 km)		report
1982 (fall)	(United States) John Paul Jr. (United States) John Paul, Sr.	(United States) JLP Racing	Porsche 935 JLP-3	500 km (310 mi)	Sprite 500 Camel GT Endurance	report
1983	(United States) Bob Tullius (Canada) Bill Adam	(United States) Group 44	Jaguar XJR-5	500 km (310 mi)	Nissan/Datsun Camel GT 500 Kilometers	report
1984	(United States) Don Whittington	(United States) Marty Hinze Racing	March 83G-Chevrolet	500 km (310 mi)	Road Atlanta 500 Kilometers Camel GT	report
1985	(United Kingdom) Brian Redman (United States) Hurley Haywood	(United States) Group 44	Jaguar XJR-5	500 km (310 mi)	Atlanta Journal-Constitution Grand Prix Camel GT	report
1986	(South Africa) Sarel van der Merwe (United States) Doc Bundy	(United States) Hendrick Motorsports	Chevrolet Corvette GTP	500 km (310 mi)	Atlanta Journal-Constitution Camel Grand Prix	report
1987	(United Kingdom) James Weaver (United States) Price Cobb	(United States) Dyson Racing	Porsche 962	500 km (310 mi)	Atlanta Journal-Constitution Grand Prix	report
1988	(Australia) Geoff Brabham (United States) John Morton	(United States) Electramotive Engineering	Nissan GTP ZX-T	500 km (310 mi)	Atlanta Journal-Constitution Camel GP	report
1989	(Australia) Geoff Brabham (United States) Chip Robinson	(United States) Electramotive Engineering	Nissan GTP ZX-T	500 km (310 mi)	Nissan Camel Grand Prix of Road Atlanta	report
1990	(Australia) Geoff Brabham (Republic of Ireland) Derek Daly	(United States) Nissan Performance	Nissan GTP ZX-T	500 km (310 mi)	Nissan Grand Prix of Atlanta	report
1991	(United States) Davy Jones	(United Kingdom) Bud Light/Jaguar Racing	Jaguar XJR-16	300 km (190 mi)	Nissan Grand Prix of Road Atlanta	report
1992	(United States) Davy Jones	(United Kingdom) Jaguar Racing	Jaguar XJR-14	1 hour, 45 minutes	Nissan Grand Prix of Road Atlanta	report
Atlanta Motor Speedway ROVAL
1993	(Argentina) Juan Manuel Fangio II	(United States) All American Racers	Eagle Mk III-Toyota	1 hour, 45 minutes	Toyota Grand Prix of Atlanta	report
Road Atlanta
1994	(United States) Jay Cochran	(United States) Euromotorsport	Ferrari 333SP	2 hours	IMSA Grand Prix of Atlanta	report
1995	(United Kingdom) James Weaver	(United States) Dyson Racing	Riley & Scott Mk III-Ford	3 hours	Rain-X/Motorola Grand Prix of Atlanta	report
1996	(Italy) Gianpiero Moretti (Italy) Max Papis	(Italy) Momo Corse	Ferrari 333SP	3 hours	Advance Auto Parts presents The Grand Prix of Atlanta	report
1997	(United States) Butch Leitzinger (United Kingdom) James Weaver	(United States) Dyson Racing	Riley & Scott Mk III-Ford	2 hours	NAPA Auto Parts Grand Prix of Atlanta; Presented By Royal Purple Motor Oil	report
1998	(United States) Butch Leitzinger (United Kingdom) James Weaver	(United States) Dyson Racing	Riley & Scott Mk III-Ford	3 hours, 45 minutes	Sports Car Grand Prix at Road Atlanta	report
American Le Mans Series
1999	(Belgium) Eric van de Poele (Italy) Mimmo Schiattarella	(Italy) Team Rafanelli SRL	Riley & Scott Mk III-Judd	2 hours, 45 minutes	The Grand Prix at Road Atlanta presented by Lease Plan USA	report
2000 – 2002	not held					
2003	(United Kingdom) Johnny Herbert (Finland) JJ Lehto	(United States) ADT Champion Racing	Audi R8	2 hours, 45 minutes	Chevy Grand Prix of Atlanta	report
2004	not held					
2005	(Germany) Marco Werner (Finland) JJ Lehto	(United States) ADT Champion Racing	Audi R8	2 hours, 45 minutes	Sportsbook.com Grand Prix of Atlanta	report
2006 – 2012	not held					
Rolex Sports Car Series
2013	(United States) Scott Pruett (Mexico) Memo Rojas	(United States) Chip Ganassi Racing	Riley MkXXVI-BMW	2 hours, 45 minutes	Visual Studio Ultimate Grand Prix of Atlanta	report
2014 – 2019	not held					
WeatherTech SportsCar Championship
2020	(Brazil) Hélio Castroneves (United States) Ricky Taylor	(United States) Team Penske	Acura ARX-05	6 hours	TireRack.com Grand Prix at Road Atlanta	report

== See also ==
- Road Atlanta Can-Am
- Petit Le Mans
