= Brumos =

Brumos may refer to:

- Brumos Racing, an automobile racing team
- Brumos Porsche 250, sports car race, later renamed WeatherTech 240
