= Grand Prix of Sonoma =

Sports car race

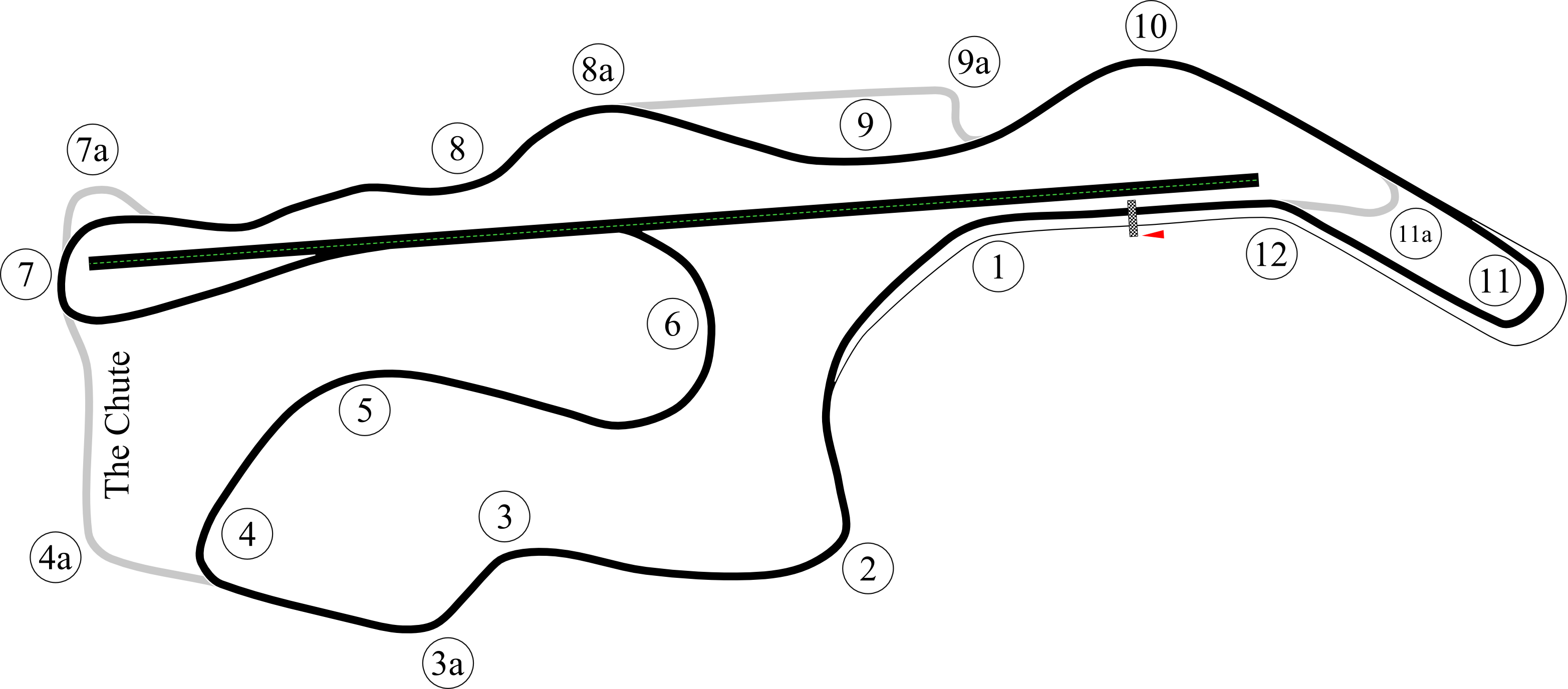
- Venue: Sonoma Raceway
- First race: 1976
- Last race: 2008
- Most wins (driver): James Weaver (3)
- Most wins (team): Dyson Racing (4)
- Most wins (manufacturer): Porsche (7)

The Grand Prix of Sonoma was a sports car race held at Sonoma Raceway (formerly Sears Point Raceway and Infineon Raceway) in Sonoma, California. It began in 1976 as an IMSA GT Championship race, before joining the American Le Mans Series from 1999 to 2005. It was a Grand-Am Rolex Sports Car Series race from 2006 to 2008.

== Winners ==
Date	Overall winner(s)	Entrant	Car	Distance/Duration	Race title	Report
IMSA GT Championship
1976	(United States) Jim Busby	(United States) Busby Racing	Porsche Carrera	100 miles (160 km)	Coca-Cola Bottler's Weekend	report
1977	(United Kingdom) David Hobbs	(United States) McLaren North America	BMW 320i Turbo	100 miles (160 km)		report
1978	(United Kingdom) David Hobbs	(United States) McLaren North America	BMW 320i	100 miles (160 km)	3rd Annual Camel GT Challenge	report
1979	(United States) Peter Gregg	(United States) Peter Gregg	Porsche 935/78	100 miles (160 km)	Sprite Grand Prix	report
1980	(United Kingdom) John Fitzpatrick	(United States) Dick Barbour Racing	Porsche 935 K3/80	100 miles (160 km)	Datsun's Golden State Challenge Grand Prix	report
1981	(West Germany) Klaus Ludwig	(United States) Team Zakspeed-Roush	Ford Mustang Turbo	100 miles (160 km)	Datsun Camel GT	report
1982	(West Germany) Klaus Ludwig	(United States) Team Zakspeed-Roush	Ford Mustang Turbo	100 miles (160 km)	Sears Point Camel GT	report
1983	(United States) Al Holbert (United States) Jim Trueman	(United States) Holbert Racing	March 83G-Porsche	3 hours	Ford California Camel GT	report
1984	(United States) Bill Whittington	(United States) Blue Thunder Racing Team	March 83G-Chevrolet	100 miles (160 km)	Ford California Camel GT	report
1985	(France) Bob Wollek	(United States) Bayside Disposal Racing	Porsche 962	300 km (190 mi)	Ford California Grand Prix	report
1986	(United States) Rob Dyson (United States) Price Cobb	(United States) Dyson Racing	Porsche 962	300 km (190 mi)	Ford California Grand Prix	report
1987	(West Germany) Jochen Mass	(United States) Bayside Motorsports	Porsche 962	300 km (190 mi)	Ford California Grand Prix	report
1988	(Australia) Geoff Brabham	(United States) Electramotive Engineering	Nissan GTP ZX-T	300 km (190 mi)	Lincoln-Mercury California Grand Prix	report
1989	(Australia) Geoff Brabham	(United States) Electramotive Engineering	Nissan GTP ZX-T	300 km (190 mi)	Lincoln-Mercury California Grand Prix	report
1990	(Argentina) Juan Manuel Fangio II	(United States) All American Racers	Eagle HF89-Toyota	300 km (190 mi)	California Camel Grand Prix	report
1991–1994: Not held
1995	(United Kingdom) James Weaver	(United States) Dyson Racing	Riley & Scott Mk III-Ford	1 hour, 45 minutes	Apple Computer, Inc. presents the California Grand Prix	report
1996	(South Africa) Wayne Taylor (United States) Scott Sharp	(United States) Doyle Racing	Riley & Scott Mk III-Oldsmobile	3 hours	Toshiba California Grand Prix	report
1997	(United Kingdom) Andy Wallace (United Kingdom) James Weaver	(United States) Dyson Racing	Riley & Scott Mk III-Ford	2 hours	California Grand Prix	report
1998: Not held
American Le Mans Series
1999	(Finland) JJ Lehto (United Kingdom) Steve Soper	(Germany) BMW Motorsport	BMW V12 LMR	2 hours, 45 minutes	Grand Prix of Sonoma presented by Toshiba	report
2000	(United Kingdom) Allan McNish (Italy) Rinaldo Capello	(Germany) Audi Sport North America	Audi R8	2 hours, 45 minutes	Grand Prix of Sonoma	report
2001	(Italy) Rinaldo Capello (Denmark) Tom Kristensen	(Germany) Audi Sport North America	Audi R8	2 hours, 45 minutes	X-Factor Grand Prix of Sonoma	report
2002	(Australia) David Brabham (Denmark) Jan Magnussen	(United States) Panoz Motor Sports	Panoz LMP 01	2 hours, 45 minutes	Grand Prix of Sonoma presented by Foster's Lager	report
2003	(United States) Butch Leitzinger (United Kingdom) James Weaver	(United States) Dyson Racing	Lola EX257-AER	2 hours, 45 minutes	Infineon Grand Prix of Sonoma	report
2004	(Finland) JJ Lehto (Germany) Marco Werner	(United States) ADT Champion Racing	Audi R8	2 hours, 45 minutes	Infineon Grand Prix of Sonoma	report
2005	(Germany) Frank Biela (Italy) Emanuele Pirro	(United States) ADT Champion Racing	Audi R8	2 hours, 45 minutes	Infineon Grand Prix of Sonoma	report
Rolex Sports Car Series
2006	(United States) Scott Pruett (Mexico) Luis Díaz	(United States) Chip Ganassi Racing with Felix Sabates	Riley Mk XI-Lexus	400 km (250 mi)		report
2007*	(United States) Jon Fogarty (United States) Alex Gurney	(United States) GAINSCO/Bob Stallings Racing	Riley Mk XI-Pontiac	400 km (250 mi)	Armed Forces Grand-Am 250	report
2008*	(Italy) Max Angelelli (Canada) Michael Valiante	(United States) SunTrust Racing	Dallara DP01-Pontiac	250 miles (400 km)	Armed Forces 250	report

*Daytona Prototypes only.
