= WeatherTech 240 =

Grand-Am Rolex Sports Car Series
- Venue: Daytona International Speedway
- Corporate sponsor: WeatherTech
- First race: 1967
- First Grand-Am race: 2000
- Last race: 2020
- Distance: 249.2 Miles
- Laps: 70
- Previous names: Brumos Porsche 250 (2005-2010); Paul Revere 250 (1967-2004)

The WeatherTech 240, also previously known as the Paul Revere 250, was a sports car race held on the road course at Daytona International Speedway on or around Independence Day, the same weekend of the NASCAR Cup Series' Firecracker 400. It has been held off-and-on over the history of that event, either the same night, or a couple days before. Traditionally, the race was held late at night, and finished in the early morning hours of the next day. The theme of the race was based on the famous "Midnight Ride" of Revolutionary War patriot Paul Revere.

From 1967 to 1968, the race was sanctioned by the SCCA. From 1969 to 1972, it was held as part of the NASCAR Grand American tour. Starting in 1973, it became part of the IMSA circuit, and continued through 1983. In some years, NASCAR drivers that raced in the Firecracker 400 in the morning, also took part in Paul Revere 250 that same night. In 1984, it switched to an SCCA Trans-Am event for one season. For 1985–1986, it was a motorcycle race, then it was discontinued.

In 2000, the event was revived by the Grand Am series. The tradition of starting late at night, however, was muted somewhat. The event was scheduled as a Thursday or Friday night event, held immediately following NASCAR pole qualifying and/or final practice. The start time would be roughly 10 p.m. eastern. Attendance for the weeknight races was very sparse. NASCAR's typical weeknight qualifying crowd is normally small, and most of those that were in attendance left as soon as qualifying was over. In 2009, the race was moved to Saturday afternoon as part of a Grand Am/NASCAR day-night doubleheader.

The race was removed from the schedule after 2010, and went on hiatus for a decade. In 2020, due to the COVID-19 pandemic, IMSA reorganized their schedule. They announced they would be resuming their season at Daytona with an evening race on July 4, marking the return of summer sportscar racing at Daytona. The race was named the WeatherTech 240, with a duration of 2 hours and 40 minutes, and was to be held in front of a limited number of spectators.

== Past winners ==
Date	Overall winner(s)	Entrant	Car	Distance/Duration	Report
SCCA Trans-Am
July 4, 1967	(United States) Parnelli Jones	Bud Moore	Mercury Cougar	250 mi (400 km)	report
NASCAR Grand Touring/Grand American
July 4, 1968	(United States) Lloyd Ruby	Bud Moore	Mercury Cougar	250 mi (400 km)	report
July 4, 1969	(United States) Pete Hamilton		Chevrolet Camaro	250 mi (400 km)	report
July 4, 1970	(United States) Jim Paschal		AMC Javelin	250 mi (400 km)	report
July 4, 1971	(United States) Buck Baker		Pontiac Firebird	250 mi (400 km)	report
July 4, 1972	(United States) Vince Gimondo		Chevrolet Camaro	250 mi (400 km)	report
IMSA GT Championship
July 4, 1973	(United States) Gene Felton	Gene Felton	Chevrolet Camaro	250 mi (400 km)	report
July 4, 1974	(United States) Hurley Haywood	Applejack Racing	Porsche Carrera RSR	250 mi (400 km)	report
July 4, 1975	(Germany) Hans-Joachim Stuck	BMW Motorsport	BMW 3.0 CSL	250 mi (400 km)	report
July 4, 1976	(United States) Al Holbert	Holbert Racing	Chevrolet Monza	250 mi (400 km)	report
July 4, 1977	(United States) George Dyer	George Dyer	Porsche 934	250 mi (400 km)	report
July 4, 1978	(United States) Peter Gregg	Brumos Porsche	Porsche 935	250 mi (400 km)	report
July 4, 1979	(United States) Charles Mendez (United States) Hurley Haywood		Porsche 935	250 mi (400 km)	report
July 4, 1980	(United Kingdom) John Fitzpatrick	Dick Barbour Racing	Porsche 935 K3	250 mi (400 km)	report
July 5, 1981	(Colombia) Mauricio de Narvaez (United States) Hurley Haywood	Dick Barbour Racing	Porsche 935J	250 mi (400 km)	report
July 3, 1982	(United States) Ted Field (United States) Danny Ongais	Interscope Racing	Lola T600-Chevrolet	250 mi (400 km)	report
July 4, 1983	(United States) A. J. Foyt (United States) Hurley Haywood	Preston Henn	Porsche 935	250 mi (400 km)	report
SCCA Trans-Am
July 3, 1984	(United States) Willy T. Ribbs	Jack Roush	Mercury Capri	157 mi (253 km)^{A}	report
AMA Championship Cup Series
July 3, 1985	(United States) Larry Shorts (United States) Gregg Smrz	Dr. John's Team Moto Guzzi	Moto Guzzi Le Mans	250 mi (400 km)	report
October 19, 1986^{B}	(United States) Merrill Moen (United States) Otis Lance	Team Lockhart	Suzuki GSX-R1100	250 mi (400 km)	report
Grand-Am Rolex Sports Car Series
June 29, 2000	(United Kingdom) James Weaver (United Kingdom) Andy Wallace	Dyson Racing	Riley & Scott Mk III-Ford	250 mi (400 km)	report
July 4, 2002	(United Kingdom) James Weaver (United States) Chris Dyson	Dyson Racing	Riley & Scott Mk III-Ford	250 mi (400 km)	report
July 3, 2003	(United States) Forest Barber (United States) Terry Borcheller	Bell Motorsports	Doran JE4-Chevrolet	250 mi (400 km)	report
July 1, 2004	(South Africa) Wayne Taylor (Italy) Max Angelelli	SunTrust Racing	Riley Mk XI-Pontiac	250 mi (400 km)	report
June 30, 2005	(United States) Butch Leitzinger (United States) Elliott Forbes-Robinson	Howard Boss Motorsports	Crawford DP03-Pontiac	250 mi (400 km)	report
June 29, 2006	(United States) Colin Braun (Germany) Jörg Bergmeister	Krohn Racing	Riley Mk XI-Ford	250 mi (400 km)	report
July 5, 2007	(United States) Alex Gurney (United States) Jon Fogarty	GAINSCO/Bob Stallings Racing	Riley Mk XI-Pontiac	250 mi (400 km)	report
July 3, 2008	(Mexico) Memo Rojas (United States) Scott Pruett	Chip Ganassi Racing	Riley Mk XX-Lexus	250 mi (400 km)	report
July 4, 2009	(Italy) Max Angelelli (United States) Brian Frisselle	SunTrust Racing	Dallara DP01-Ford	250 mi (400 km)	report
July 3, 2010	(Mexico) Memo Rojas (United States) Scott Pruett	Chip Ganassi Racing	Riley Mk XX-BMW	250 mi (400 km)	report
IMSA WeatherTech SportsCar Championship
July 4, 2020	(United States) Jonathan Bomarito (United Kingdom) Harry Tincknell	Mazda Motorsports	Mazda MZ-2.0T 2.0 L Turbo I4	2 hours, 40 minutes	report

- ^A Run in twin 22-lap heats.
- ^B 1986 motorcycle event was scheduled for July 3, but was rained out and rescheduled for October.

== Double Duty ==
In the earlier years of the event, a number of NASCAR drivers who participated in the Firecracker 400 also drove in the Paul Revere 250 in the same day or same weekend. In recent years, some drivers have also dabbled in the "double duty." In 2009, Scott Speed and Kyle Busch raced in both events in the same day, teaming up at Chip Ganassi Racing for the '250.'
