= Daytona 250 =

Daytona 250 may refer to:

- Fresh From Florida 250, a NASCAR Craftsman Truck Series race at Daytona International Speedway
- Brumos Porsche 250, a Grand American Road Racing Association Rolex Sports Car Series race at Daytona International Speedway
