= Fort Lauderdale Swap Shop =

Market and drive-in theater in Fort Lauderdale, Florida

Coordinates: 26.13727°N 80.19158°W

The Fort Lauderdale Swap Shop is an 80 acre indoor and outdoor flea market, featuring a 14-screen drive-in theater in Fort Lauderdale, Florida. From 1989–2006 the Hanneford Family Circus performed daily (except Tuesdays) in the Swap Shop food court, entertaining the roughly 12 million people who visit each year.

== History ==
On November 22, 1963, Betty and Preston Henn opened the Thunderbird Drive-in Theater. In the beginning, there was one screen (was in use as Screen 9) — and a reputation for showing adult movies, which concerned passing motorists. Initially the parking lot was divided by a fence to divide the white customers from the African American customers.

After a 1966 trip to the American West Coast, Henn decided to add a flea market, allowing the region to have a collective rummage sale and encouraging the start of many small businesses in southeastern Florida. The addition ushered in a period of expansion (to 11 screens by 1980) and increased popularity.

An outdoor food court was added in 1979; a decade later, a stage was added and the food court was enclosed and air conditioned. Initially, the circus shared the stage with 1960s and 1970s pop and country acts, most notably K.C. and the Sunshine Band, Willie Nelson, Loretta Lynn and Three Dog Night.

Expansion continued into the 1990s, when Screens 12 and 13 were put into use, and into 2005, when the former Thunderbird Drive-in started projecting onto its fourteenth screen. On October 24, 2005, Hurricane Wilma damaged several of the screens, currently only 13 of the 14 are in use.

In addition to the Fort Lauderdale Swap Shop, the Henns own and operated three others, the Margate Swap Shop (which closed in 2007), the Lake Worth Swap Shop and Drive-in and Tampa Fun-Lan Swap Shop and Drive-in which closed in 2021. The drive in at the Fort Lauderdale location closed in 2023 after a suspicious fire burned screen 5, but the flea market is still in operation.

The Lake Worth Swap Shop is open as of September 2025, but is scheduled to be closed by the City of Palm Springs by the end of the month.
