= Preston Henn =

American racing driver and entrepreneur (1931–2017)

- Born: Preston Byron Henn; January 20, 1931; Murphy, North Carolina, U.S.
- Died: April 30, 2017 (aged 86); Hillsboro Beach, Florida, U.S.
- Occupation: Entrepreneur

Preston Byron Henn (January 20, 1931 – April 30, 2017) was an American entrepreneur who founded the Fort Lauderdale Swap Shop in 1963.

== Business career ==
Henn opened what became the Swap Shop as a drive-in movie theater in 1963. He shortly thereafter decided to add a flea market. Through shrewd business practices and somewhat extravagant promotion, Henn was able to grow the Fort Lauderdale Swap Shop into one of the region's most popular tourist attractions. Throughout its drive-in theater ownership, he owned three drive-in theaters in the state of Florida. In 2005, Henn began making unusual decisions such as firing the facility's trademark circus act, and it was rumored he was selling the facility. Later that year, he was involved in a violent altercation with a vendor he was trying to evict. Police used a taser to subdue him. Henn was subsequently sent to a mental hospital for again attempting to assault the vendor.

== Racing career ==
In 1983, Henn, along with co-drivers A. J. Foyt, Bob Wollek, and Claude Ballot-Lena drove his Porsche 935 to victory in the 24 Hours of Daytona. The following year Henn's Porsche 956 driven by John Paul Jr. and Jean Rondeau placed second in the 24 Hours of Le Mans, two laps behind the winning 956 of Henri Pescarolo and Klaus Ludwig. Henn, driving with Michel Ferté and Edgar Dören, failed to finish in their Porsche 962 after ignition failure while on lap 247 (Pescarolo/Ludwig covered 360 laps). Driving in the IMSA GTP class, Henn's brand new 962 was the first time the new model was raced at Le Mans. There was another Porsche 962 in the Group C class run for British team John Fitzpatrick Racing, though it was a converted 956, making the white Swap Shop Porsche the first true 962 to race at Le Mans.

Henn himself made five starts at Le Mans with a best finish of tenth in 1983. His Porsche 962 driven by Foyt and Wollek won the 1985 12 Hours of Sebring.

Henn also participated in offshore powerboat racing. He inexplicably ceased all racing activities a few years later and subsequently refused to discuss his racing career. Despite this, Henn still maintained an extensive exotic car collection both in his private estate and on display at the Swap Shop and was a participant of the Ferrari FXX program. His 1964 Ferrari 275 GTB/C Speciale could become the first car to sell for more than $100 million.

== Personal life and death ==
In 2013, Henn was the first person to buy a Gulfstream G650.

In 2016, Henn filed suit against Ferrari for damages in the United States District Court, Southern District of Florida, Fort Lauderdale Division. His complaint alleges his reputation as a Ferrari collector has been damaged as he was not selected by Ferrari to purchase a LaFerrari Aperta.

Henn died April 30, 2017, at his home, survived by his wife of over 60 years, Betty. He was 86.

== Racing record ==
=== 24 Hours of Daytona results ===
Year	Team	Co-Drivers	Car	Class	Laps	Pos.	Class Pos.
1979	(United States) North American Racing Team	(France) Jean-Pierre Delaunay (France) Cyril Grandet	Ferrari 512BB-LM	IMSA GTX	54	DNF	DNF
1980	(United States) North American Racing Team	(France) Jean-Pierre Delaunay	Ferrari 512BB-LM	IMSA	0	DNS	DNS
1981	(United States) Thunderbird Swap Shop	(United States) Mike Chandler (France) Marcel Mignot	Porsche 935-K3/80	IMSA GTX	45	DNF	DNF
1982	(United States) North American Racing Team (United States) T-Bird Swap Shop	(United States) Randy Lanier (France) Denis Morin	Ferrari 512BB-LM	IMSA GTX	43	DNF	DNF
1983	(United Kingdom) John Fitzpatrick Racing (United States) T-Bird Swap Shop	(France) Claude Ballot-Léna (France) Jean-Louis Schlesser	Porsche 956	Gr. C	328	10th	10th
1984	(United States) Henn's T-Bird Swap Shop	(Germany) Edgar Dören (France) Michel Ferté	Porsche 962	IMSA GTP	247	DNF	DNF
