= March 83G =

Racing automobile

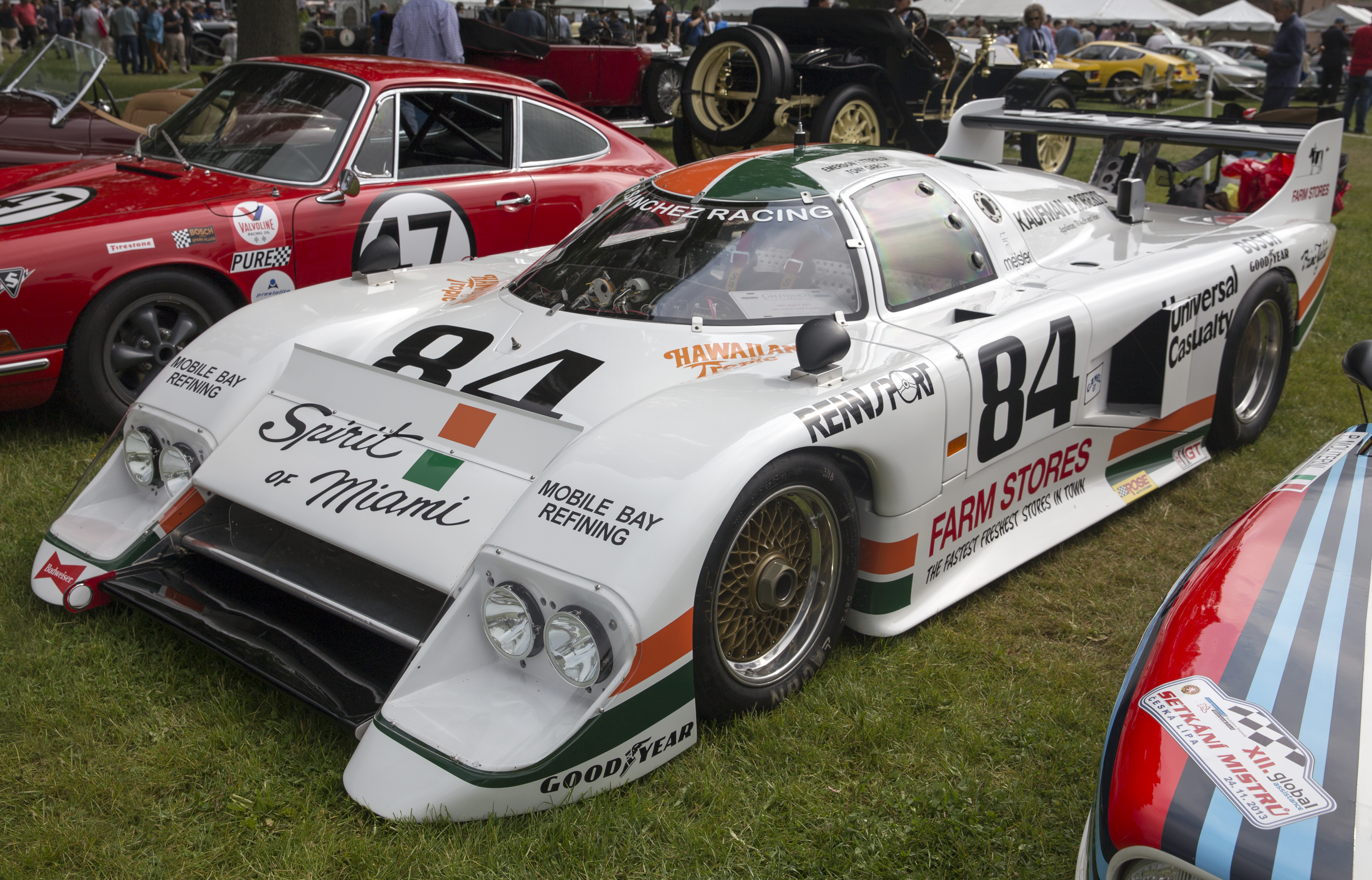
- Category: IMSA GTP/Group C

Technical specifications
- Chassis: Carbon fiber/kevlar body and aluminum honeycomb monocoque chassis
- Suspension: Double wishbones, coil springs over shock absorbers, anti-roll bars
- Axle track: 1,565 mm (61.6 in) (front); 1,539 mm (60.6 in) (rear)
- Wheelbase: 2,685 mm (105.7 in)
- Engine: Chevrolet 5.7 L (347.8 cu in) 90° OHV V8 naturally-aspirated mid-engined Porsche 2.65 L (161.7 cu in) 180° DOHC B6 twin-turbocharged mid-engined Nissan 2.1 L (128.1 cu in) DOHC I4 twin-turbocharged mid-engined
- Transmission: 5-speed manual
- Power: 570–650 hp (430–480 kW)
- Weight: 900 kg (2,000 lb)

Competition history
- Debut: 1982 3 Hours of Daytona

The March 83G is a IMSA GTP/Group C sports prototype race car, designed, developed and built by British manufacturer March Engineering.

The 83G debuted at the final round of the 1982 IMSA GT Championship at Daytona, driven by Jim Trueman and Bobby Rahal. Al Holbert and Randy Lanier won the titles in 1983 and 1984 respectively. In 1984 the Porsche 962 began to dominate the IMSA GTP class.

== Gallery ==
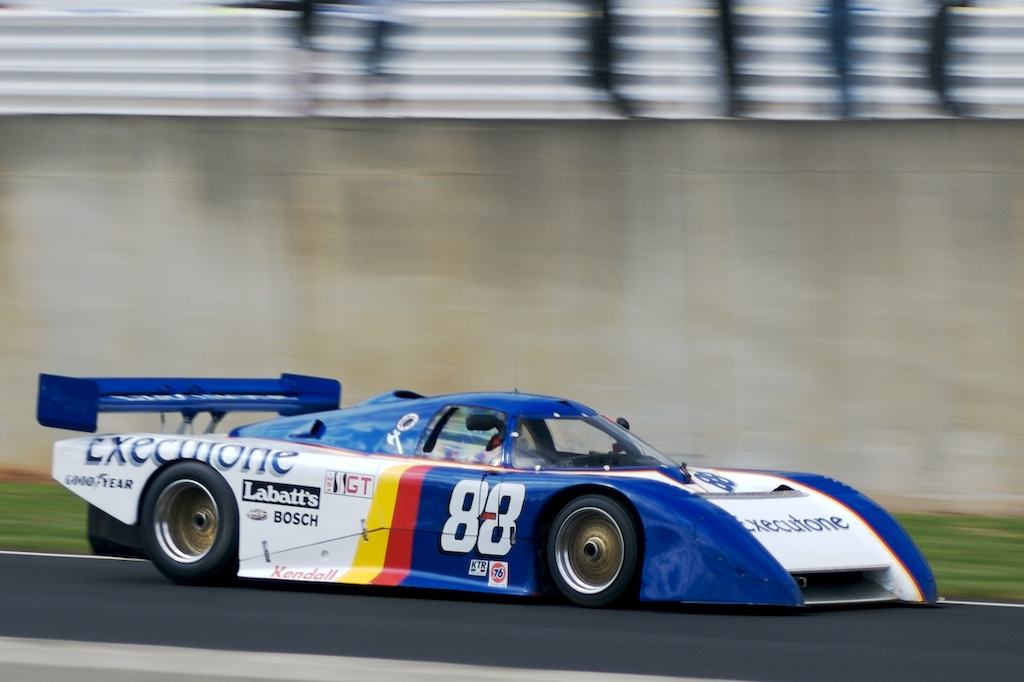
March 83G at Road Atlanta in 2007

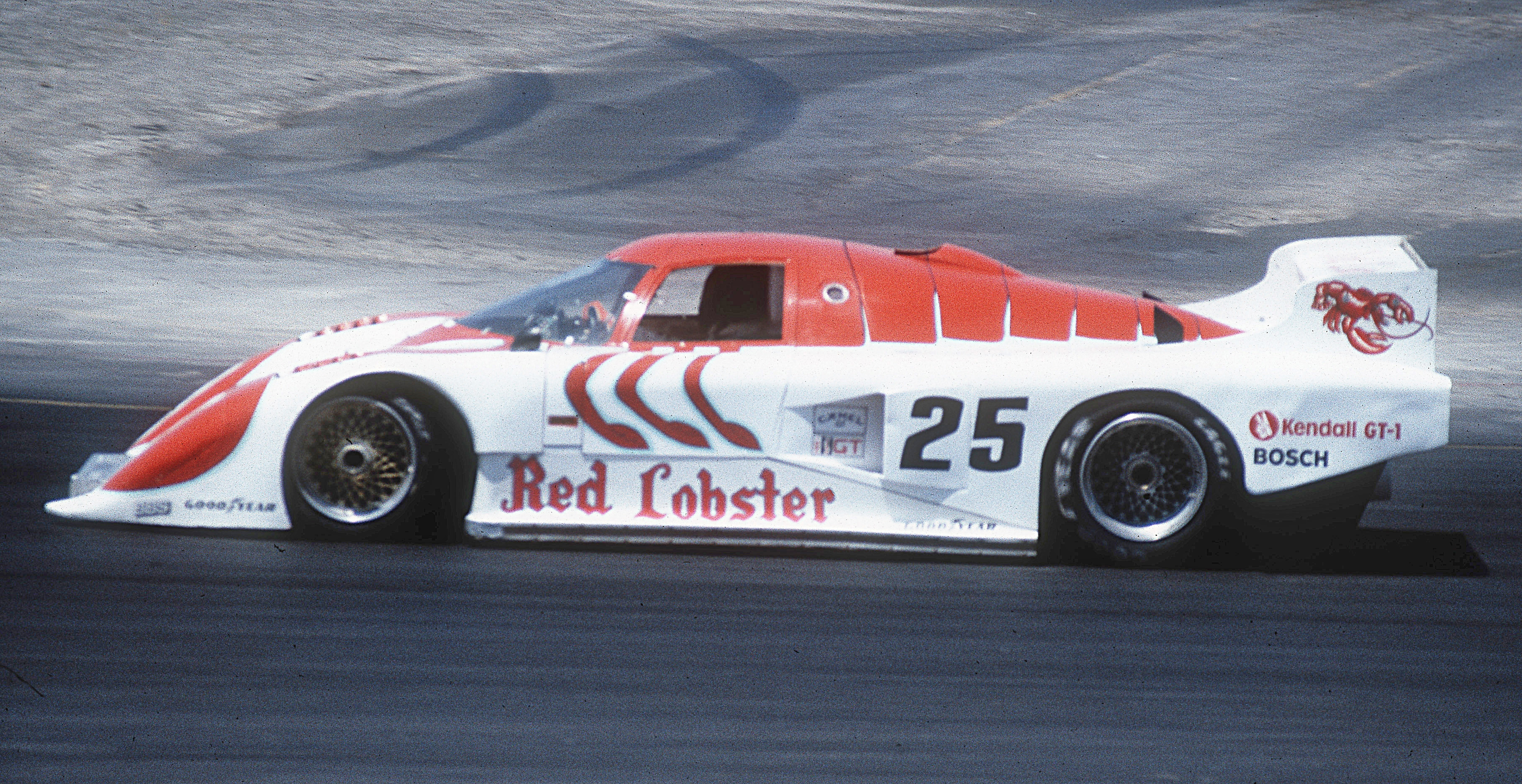
Dave Cowart and Kenper Miller driving the Red Lobster March 83G-Chevy at Sears Point (now Sonoma) Raceway in an IMSA Camel GT race in 1983.

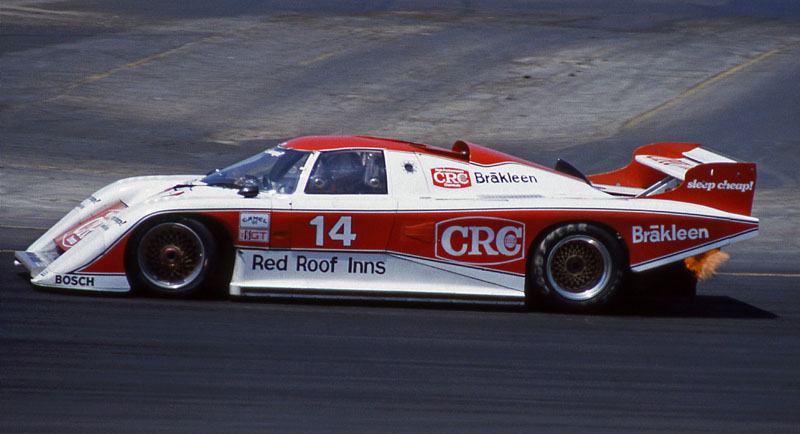
Al Holbert and Jim Trueman co-drove this March 83G-Porsche (chassis #04) to victory in the 1983 IMSA Camel GT event at Sears Point Raceway in Sonoma, California.
