= Riley & Scott Mk III =

Sports auto racing car

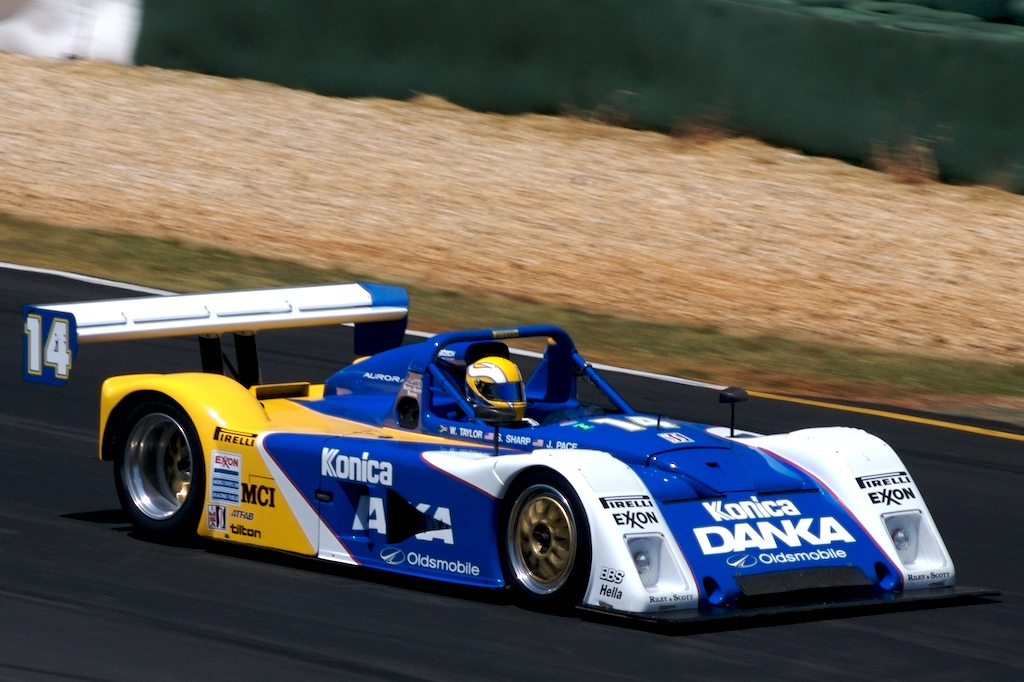
- Category: World Sports Car (WSC); Sports Racer 1 (SR1); Le Mans Prototype (LMP)
- Constructor: Riley & Scott
- Designers: Bob and Bill Riley, John Roncz, Rob Passarelli

Technical specifications
- Chassis: Steel tube frame and carbon composite
- Suspension (front): Double wishbone suspension, pushrod activated coil springs
- Suspension (rear): Double wishbone suspension, pushrod activated coil springs
- Engine: Ford V8; Ford-Mader V8; Oldsmobile Aurora V8; Chevrolet V8; BMW M62 V8; Judd GV4 V10
- Transmission: 5-speed manual
- Tyres: Pirelli; Goodyear; Yokohama

Competition history
- Notable entrants: (United States) Dyson Racing (United States) Doyle Racing (United States) Robinson Racing (Italy) Target 24/R & M (Italy) Team Rafanelli (France) Solution F
- Debut: 1995 24 Hours of Daytona
- Last season: 2002
Races	Wins	Poles	F/Laps
135	48	38	31
- Teams' Championships: 6 (IMSA 1997, USRRC 1998, USRRC 1999, Rolex 2000, Rolex 2001, Rolex 2002)
- Constructors' Championships: 3 (USRRC 1999, Rolex 2000, Rolex 2001)
- Drivers' Championships: 8 (IMSA 1996, IMSA 1997, IMSA 1998, USRRC 1998, USRRC 1999, ALMS 1999, Rolex 2000, Rolex 2001)

The Riley & Scott Mark III (Mk III) was a sports prototype auto racing car developed by Bob Riley, Bill Riley and Mark Scott of Riley & Scott Cars Inc. Initially designed in 1993, the car was created for the World Sports Car (WSC) category which was to debut in the North American IMSA GT Championship during their 1994 season. It was not until 1995 that the first Mk III was completed, but the construction of further cars allowed a variety of teams to campaign in several North American and European racing series, including competing at the 24 Hours of Le Mans.

In 1999, Riley & Scott evolved the Mk III's designs in order to adapt to the newer Le Mans Prototype (LMP) regulations which were now used in several series. An all-new third design officially known as the Mark III Series C debuted in 2001 as the final variant developed by the company before they moved on to other programs. Several private teams also made their own modifications to their Mk IIIs in attempts to improve the car's performance to suit their own needs.

The original Mk IIIs were used in competition until the end of 2002, in the process accumulating 47 overall race victories in both North American and Europe, as well as championship titles in the IMSA GT Championship, United States Road Racing Championship, Rolex Sports Car Series and American Le Mans Series. Mk III Cs continued to compete until 2005, although they were never able to achieve victories like their earlier predecessor.

== Development history ==
In 1993, Bill Riley began initial work on a design for a sports prototype to meet the International Motor Sports Association's (IMSA) World Sports Car regulations. The new regulations, announced during the 1993 season and were intended to be debut in the 1994 season, sought low-cost open-cockpit prototypes to replace the expensive closed-cockpit GTP models used in the IMSA GT Championship. Riley & Scott, already experienced constructors in the Trans-Am Series, were looking to enter the sports prototype category of motorsports.

The new car, known as the Mk III, featured a radical design with tapered rear sidepods that flowed into the rear wing mounts. This opened a large amount of empty space around the rear wheels and exposed much of the floor of the chassis. Radiators for cooling were all placed at the front of the car, under a simple sloping nose. Interest in this design was, however, low and Riley & Scott did not construct a car for the 1994 season. During that same year, Dyson Racing contracted Riley & Scott to aid in improving the team's current WSC car, a Spice DR3 chassis with a Ferrari engine. After completing the improvements for Dyson, Bob and Bill Riley returned to their Mk III design with new knowledge from their Dyson experience. After the Mk III was redesigned, Riley & Scott were able to convince Dyson Racing to replace their Spice-Ferrari with two new Mk IIIs for the 1995 season.

Bill Riley's redesigned Mk III was simpler in its design, allowing more variety for customers, as well as a low cost. Although the extreme aerodynamics of the original design were gone, the car was conceived to be fast enough to compete for overall wins. The redesign and eventual construction of the first car took only four months. The chassis featured a steel tube frame with panels made of carbon fiber. Behind the cockpit the engine bay was designed to be large enough to allow for a variety of naturally aspirated engines, mostly the V8s of Ford, Chevrolet and Oldsmobile that were common amongst IMSA GT privateers. All cars used a 5-speed transmission. The suspension consisted of double wishbones with coil springs attached by a pushrod. A power steering system was also part of the standard Mk III.

The redesigned carbon fiber and kevlar bodywork of the Mk III was developed by aircraft designer John Roncz, who assisted Bob Riley in using early computational fluid dynamics programs to refine the aerodynamics of the new car. Final aerodynamic testing was performed at a Lockheed windtunnel. The nose of the final Mk III was very similar to the original design model from 1993, featuring a nose which sloped downward towards a splitter extended from the front of the car. In the center, a wide intake allowed air into the radiator mounted flat under the nose. The air exited the radiator from two openings on top of the nose and in front of the cockpit. Between these exit vents, teams had the option of installing extra headlights for night races. A circular duct was placed on either side of the radiator intake to allow air to the front brakes for cooling. Behind the front wheels the bodywork was relatively square and flat, with full sidepods running the full width of the car. A rules-mandated full width roll hoop was positioned behind the cockpit. Positioned under the roll hoop was an arched intake for the engine airbox.

On the sidepods several square holes were created in order to allow teams to adjust their cooling and aerodynamics dependent upon engines used, circuits and conditions. The squares could be filled with bodywork of various shapes and sizes, effectively closing or opening the holes as much as the team wished. At the back of the car, the bodywork ended immediately behind the rear wheels, with only the rear wing placed beyond the end of the bodywork. Overall, the aerodynamics of the Mk III were designed to be low in drag but still offer large amounts of downforce.

In total, 17 Mk IIIs were built by Riley & Scott from 1995 until 1998, with a price of approximately $285,000 for a chassis without an engine. In 1999, Riley & Scott continued their development of the Mk III by creating a second series of Mk IIIs. These cars had minor alterations and a further four chassis were built to this specification. Several teams, hoping to remain competitive with the Mk III, also upgraded their cars to match the Series 2 specifications.

=== Mk III C ===
Riley & Scott Mk III C
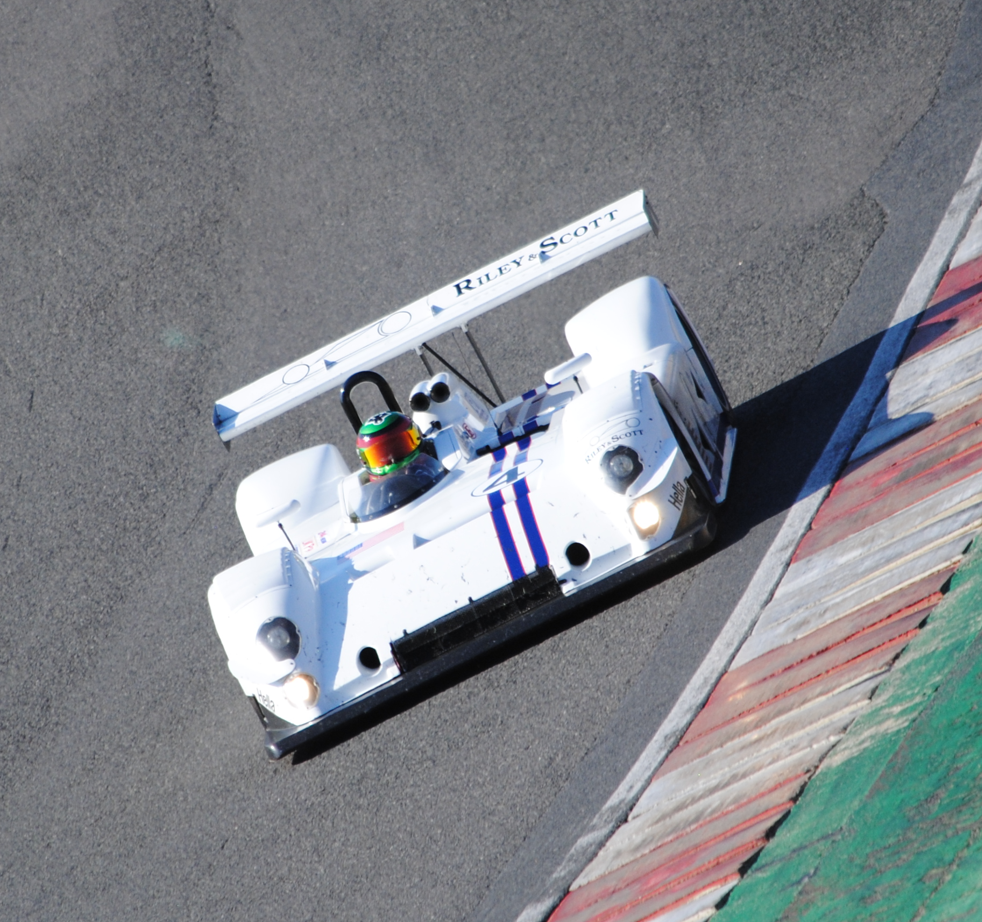
- Category: Le Mans Prototype 900 (LMP900); Sports Racer Prototype I (SRPI)
- Constructor: Riley & Scott
- Designers: Bob and Bill Riley

Technical specifications
- Chassis: Steel tube frame and carbon composite
- Suspension (front): Double wishbone suspension, pushrod activated coil springs
- Suspension (rear): Double wishbone suspension, pushrod activated coil springs
- Engine: Lincoln (Élan) 6L8 V8; Ford (Yates) V8; Judd GV4 V10
- Transmission: X-Trac 6-speed manual (optional sequential)

Competition history
- Notable entrants: (United States) Dyson Racing (United States) Jim Matthews Racing (United States) Robinson Racing (United States) Intersport Racing (United States) American Spirit Racing (United States) Autocon Motorsports
- Debut: 2001 12 Hours of Sebring
- Last season: 2005
Races	Wins	Poles	F/Laps
32	0	0	0

Riley & Scott had ended their progressing development of the Mk III during the 1999 season, in part due to the company being contracted by General Motors (GM) to construct a Le Mans Prototype for their Cadillac brand. The resulting Northstar LMP borrowed elements of the Mk III's design and layout. Modern features were included on the Cadillac, including a carbon fiber monocoque replacing the composite monocoque of the Mk III, a roll hoop over only the driver's seat instead of the full width of the cockpit and a relocation of the radiators to lower the nose. An evolved Riley & Scott-built Northstar LMP design appeared in 2001 but the company was not contracted to build the 2002 version of the car.

Once the Northstar LMPs for the 2001 season were completed, Riley & Scott turned their attention back to their Mk III which were still earning victories even without major upgrades in nearly two seasons. Rather than evolving a design which was now six years old, Riley & Scott chose to start from scratch and develop an all-new car which continued the Mk III's simple design, but received some of the advancements that Riley & Scott had used on the Northstar LMP.

At its most basic, the Mk III Series C is nearly identical to the Mk III in terms of its layout. At the front, a slanted nose housed a radiator fed air from a vent above the front splitter and exiting over the top of the bodywork just in front of the cockpit. The sidepods were straight and flat and featured a variety of exchangeable panels for cooling and aerodynamics. An engine intake was mounted behind and above the cockpit, and shrouded an engine bay which could accept multiple naturally aspirated engine designs. Also shared with the Mk III was the use of a steel tube frame and carbon fiber chassis, rather than the all-carbon monocoque used by the Northstar LMP.

Some notable changes to the design of the Mk III for the Mk III C were concentrated on the cockpit and nose areas. While the Mk III had a roll hoop which ran the full width of the cockpit, the Mk III C was designed to share the roll hoop design of the Northstar LMP. This standard hoop was positioned immediately behind the driver's seat and integrated the intakes for the engine, although an optional roll hoop extension was offered, as it was required for the Rolex Sports Car Series. The front of the cockpit was also redesigned, as an aerodynamic windshield was added immediately in front of the driver.

The nose of the Mk III C was notably more rounded than the Mk III. The front fenders were no longer square and tapered as they extended to the front splitter. The headlights were also redesigned, including four lights instead of the previous two. The exits for the radiator were also designed to run the full width of the nose, although the openings were now slimmer than they had been on the Mk III. A new addition was further ducting located on either side of the cockpit designed to allow air from the front diffuser to exit upwards and over the top of the bodywork. The bodywork in general was also lower on the Mk III C, with the exception of the vehicle's fenders.

Mechanically, the Mk III C's transmission was a major improvement from the older car. A new 6-speed gearbox built by X-Trac was part of the package, replacing the previous 5-speed. This gearbox was further enhanced by the option of a pneumatically actuated gear change system developed by Megaline, which was activated by paddles behind the steering wheel, rather than by a traditional gear stick.

In total, five Mk III Cs were constructed by Riley & Scott, although only four were used for competition purposes. Autocon Motorsports' Mk III C, chassis #01-002, was the last car still in use by time it was retired at the end of 2005.

== Racing history ==
=== 1995 – 1997 ===
In early January 1995, Dyson Racing's first Mk III took its first laps of the Daytona International Speedway in testing for the 24 Hours of Daytona later that month. The team's drivers set the fourth fastest time, behind a trio of Ferrari 333 SPs but ahead of the brand two new Porsche WSC-95 prototypes. For the race itself Rob Dyson, James Weaver, Scott Sharp and Butch Leitzinger were assigned to the car and successfully qualified sixth. Their race would be short-lived as the Ford engine failed after only eleven laps. n March, the team entered the 12 Hours of Sebring and improved their qualifying record with a fifth place starting position. The Mk III was able to survive this endurance race and finish for the first time, earning 37th position.

Dyson's second Mk III-Ford was completed by the Grand Prix of Atlanta in April, but it was in the first chassis that James Weaver achieved victory, giving Riley & Scott their first victory as a constructor in only their third IMSA GT event. The season further improved as the team's second chassis won three consecutive races at Watkins Glen, Sears Point and Mosport, as well as earning the Mk III's first pole position at the Mosport event. Dyson Racing ended the debut season with the Mk III by finishing first and second at New Orleans. James Weaver finished second in the Drivers Championship, two points behind Ferrari driver Fermín Vélez.

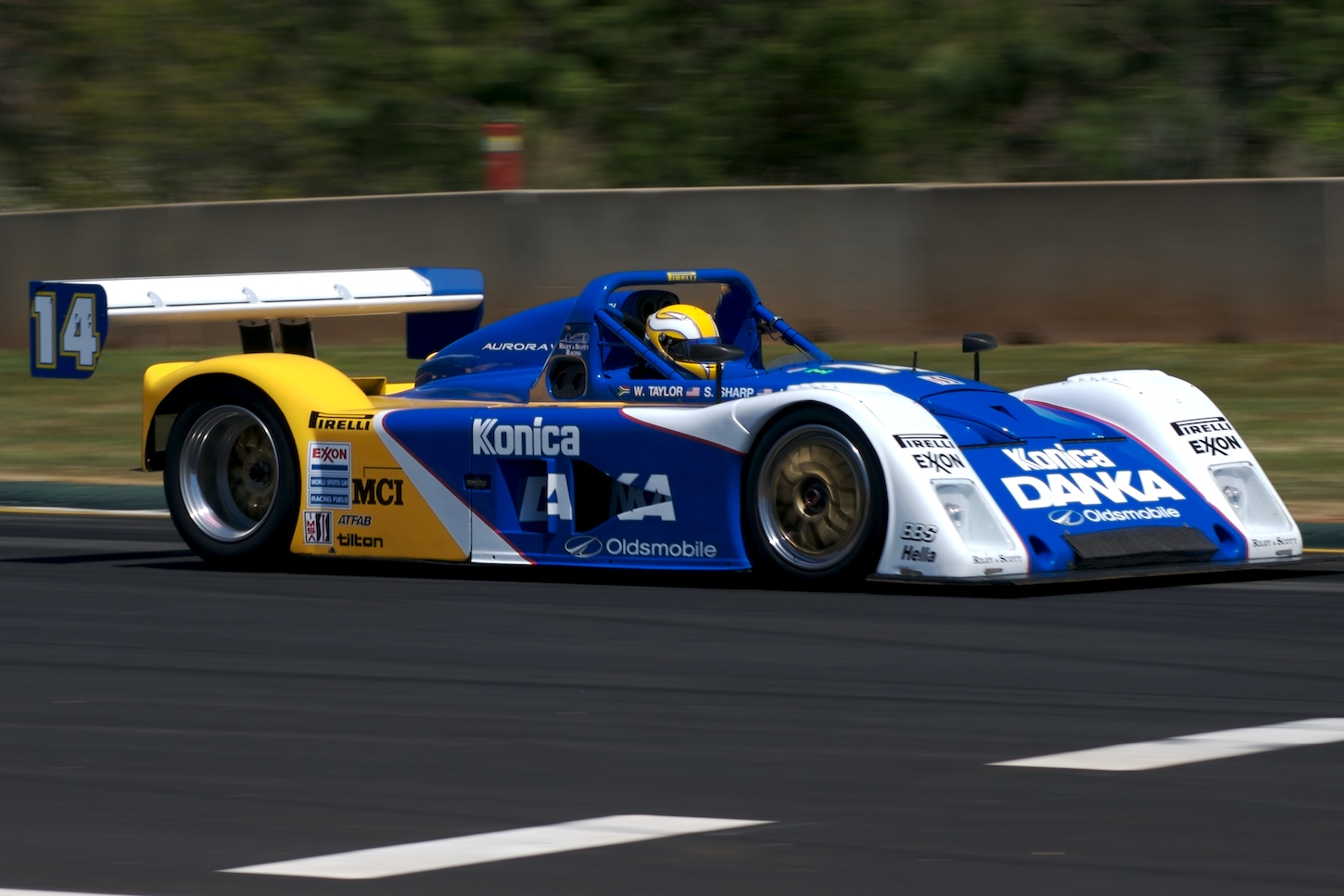
One of two Mk III-Oldsmobiles used by Doyle Racing in 1996

After a successful debut season, several teams purchased Mk IIIs for 1996. General Motors instigated the use of Oldsmobile Aurora V8s by the Riley & Scott-backed Doyle Racing and Dyson returned with their two entries. Doyle Racing immediately showed the potential of the Mk III-Oldsmobile combination by winning both the 24 Hours of Daytona and the 12 Hours of Sebring. Fighting throughout the season with the various Ferrari and Riley & Scott teams, Doyle won two further events, before Dyson Racing ended the season with three consecutive victories. Doyle Racing's Wayne Taylor won the WSC Drivers Championship, while Oldsmobile was able to win the Manufacturers Championship. Doyle's Mk III-Oldsmobile was also flown to Europe that season to participate in the 24 Hours of Le Mans. The team qualified ninth but a transmission problem forced the car to retire after fourteen hours.

The 1997 season began for Riley & Scott in the same way the 1996 season had, with a second consecutive victory at the 24 Hours of Daytona, this time earned by Dyson Racing. Ferrari was able to prevent a similar repeat win at the 12 Hours of Sebring, but Dyson rebounded with five wins in the nine remaining races in the 1997 season, to win the WSC Teams Championship. Dyson's Butch Leitzinger won the Drivers Championship and Ford secured the Manufacturers Championship, giving Riley & Scotts a clean sweep of the series.

=== 1998 – 2000 ===
1998 was a year in which the racing campaign of the Mk III blossomed. Dyson Racing was joined by Matthews-Colucci Racing, Intersport Racing, and Transatlantic Racing in running not only the IMSA GT Championship, but also the new United States Road Racing Championship (USRRC). Riley & Scott was not able to win a third successive 24 Hours of Daytona in USRRC, but Dyson Racing won the next three races and ended the five race season with a Teams Championship, a Manufacturers Championship for Ford, and a Drivers Championship for James Weaver. In IMSA GT, Dyson also won three events and secured second consecutive Drivers Championships for Butch Leitzinger and Constructors Championships for Ford, but failed to win the Teams Championship against the Doyle-Risi Racing Ferrari. A fourth Riley & Scott IMSA GT victory was also achieved by the BMW-supported Team Rafanelli of Italy, who were also among a trio of teams using Mk IIIs in the European International Sports Racing Series (ISRS) and supported by Riley & Scott's European arm. The French Solution F team of Philippe Gache earned the marque's first success outside North American by winning the final 1998 round at Kyalami, South Africa and finishing the season third in the Teams Championship.

Riley & Scott launched their revised Series 2 Mk III in 1999 and the company immediately returned to victory, winning the 24 Hours of Daytona for the third time in four years. Dyson's victory was followed by another in the third race of the USRRC season, but that was enough for Dyson's drivers Butch Leitzinger and Elliot Forbes-Robinson to be crowned champions due to the rest of the season being canceled. The IMSA GT Championship had also recently ceased to exist but had since been replaced by the American Le Mans Series (ALMS) for 1999. Dyson opened the ALMS season by finishing only nine seconds behind the winning BMW Motorsport entry at the 12 Hours of Sebring. Team Rafanelli followed this by winning the next ALMS round at Road Atlanta. The rest of the ALMS season was dominated by the BMW and Panoz entries, but consistent finishes for Dyson Racing allowed Elliot Forbes-Robinson to win his second Drivers Championship of 1999.

Outside North America, the Mk III did not have as successful of a season. Target 24, Solution F, and RWS Motorsport all contested the ISRS, now renamed the Sports Racing World Cup, but none of the three were able to win races. Solution F also entered two Mk IIIs in the 24 Hours of Le Mans alongside the Japanese Autoexe's team's car (relabeled as an Autoexe LMP99). However, all three cars were retired from the race after only 74 laps. The Autoexe's LMP99 later participated in the Le Mans Fuji 1000 km, but ran out of gasoline during the race.

In 2000, Riley & Scott's attention moved from the Mk III to their new Cadillac Northstar LMP program in partnership with General Motors. Although this meant that upgrades to the Mk III were scarce, the cars were still strong competitors. After the USRRC dissolved, the Rolex Sports Car Series was formed to take its place. Dyson Racing entered the Rolex Series, but newcomer Robinson Racing, using a new Mk III with a Judd V10 engine, was able to win in the second race of the season. A further victory was added to Robinson's total, but Dyson's four victories later that season allowed them to once again win the Teams Championship, and James Weaver earned yet another Drivers Championship from piloting the Mk III. Robinson's efforts earned them third in the Rolex Teams Championship. In the ALMS, Dyson chose not to return, leaving the German Pole Team as the sole Riley & Scott entrant over the year. The team's best result was an eighth-place finish, but following European rounds the team decided not to return to North America for the rest of the year. In the Sports Racing World Cup, two Italian teams campaigned for Riley & Scott. The R & M Mk III, also using a Judd V10, won the team's home race at Monza, but reliability problems over the rest of the season left them fifth in the Teams Championship.

=== 2001 – 2005 ===
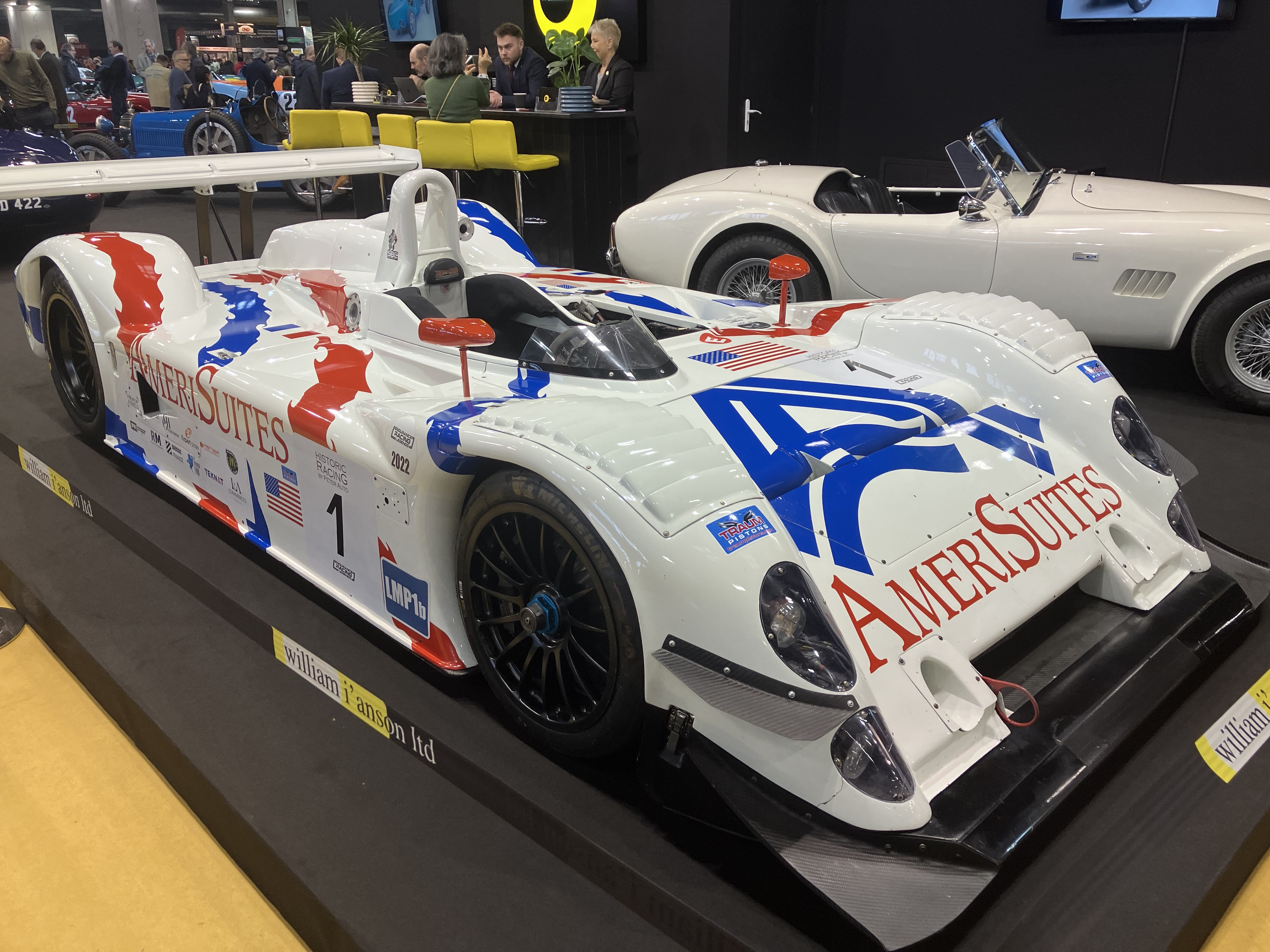

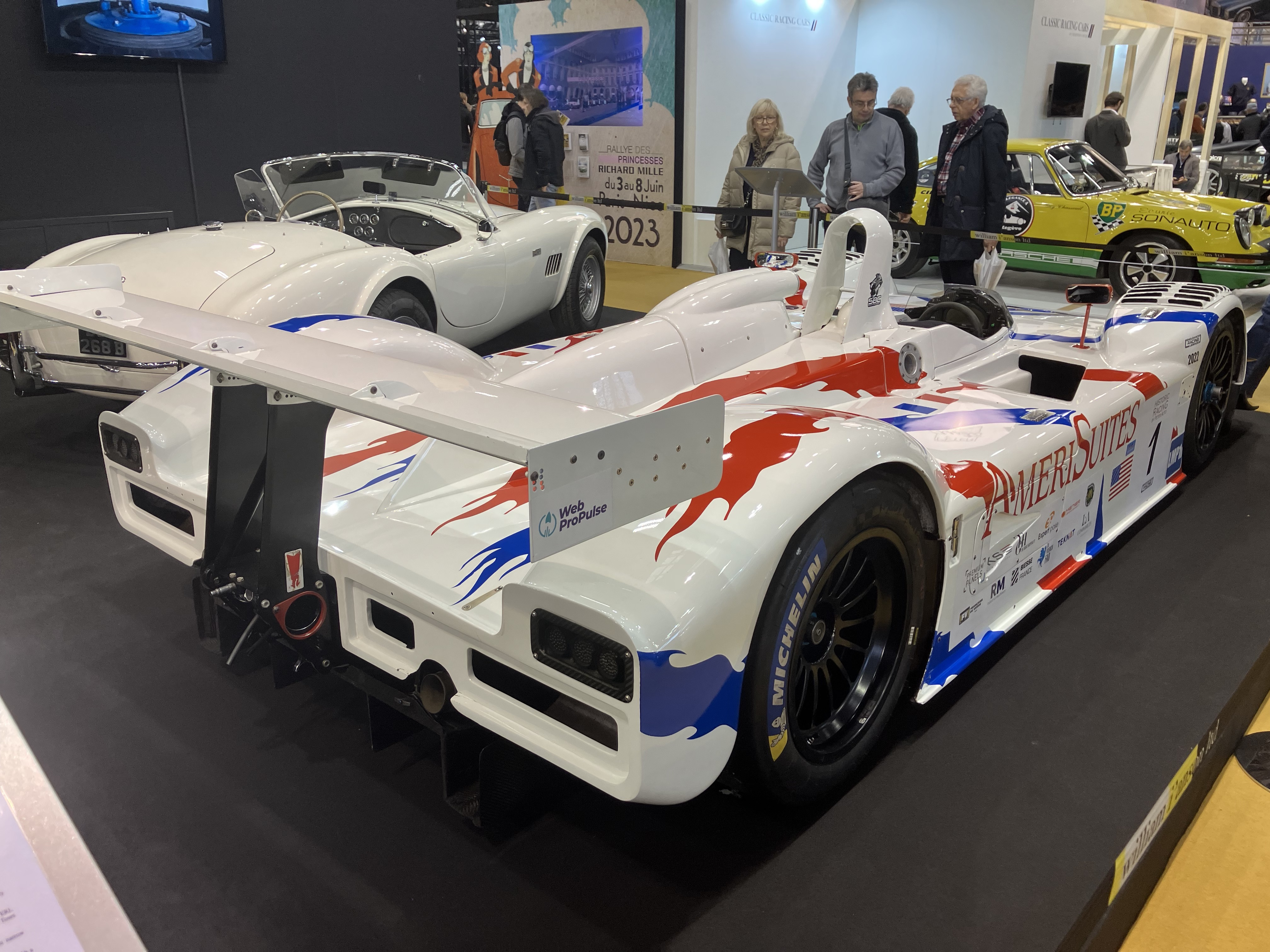
Dyson Racing's Mk III C driven by James Weaver and Butch Leitzinger

In 2001, the lifetime of the original Mk III was nearing its end. By April, Dyson had earned a sole Rolex Series victory at Homestead-Miami Speedway, but in April the Riley & Scott program was rejuvenated. Having completed their year of running the Cadillac squad, Riley & Scott had returned to development of the Mk III and were completing their latest evolution. Dyson received the first Mk III C, but rather than remain in the Rolex Series, the new car made its debut at the 12 Hours of Sebring in the American Le Mans Series. The new car finished in fifth place in its first race, but quickly improved that performance with a podium finish at the Grand Prix of Mid-Ohio. For the Rolex Series, Dyson and Robinson Racing initially campaigned their older Mk IIIs, but Robinson Racing received the second new Mk III Cs in time for the 6 Hours of Watkins Glen. The car's debut was however short lived as a heavy accident in practice required a lengthy reconstruction. Dyson still proved the old car was able to succeed, winning four more Rolex races. Robinson's damaged Mk III C was able to be repaired in order to make its race debut at the last event of the season, finishing in third place. Even with the Mk III in the process of being replaced, Dyson still won the Teams Championship and James Weaver earned his second straight Rolex Series Drivers Championship.

By the start of the 2002 season Riley & Scott had been dissolved by the bankruptcy of owners Reynard Motorsport and Riley Technologies had taken over care of the Mk III Cs. Two more chassis were now completed and Intersport Racing and Riley-backed Jim Matthews Racing joined the ranks of Dyson and Robinson. Dyson however chose not to continue using their Mk III C in 2002, opting instead to actually use the older Mk III once again. Dyson's choice to return to the older car did not however hinder their performance, as the team was winning races once again in the Rolex Series, earning four straight in the middle of the season. Dyson also campaigned their Mk III in the ALMS with a best finish of fourth, including at the 12 Hours of Sebring, but later chose to replace their ALMS Mk III with an MG-Lola EX257. Still running the Mk III in Rolex a final victory was earned before the close of the season. Chris Dyson fell two short of the Drivers Championship behind Didier Theys, but the Dyson Racing team beat out Theys' Doran Racing by two points to earn another Teams Championship. New regulations for the Rolex Sports Car Series were announced during 2002 which made the Mk III ineligible to compete from 2003 onwards, so Dyson Racing's victory at the Daytona finale marked the last win earned by the original Mk III design.

The Mk III C, although not victorious, did manage several podium finishes in both the Rolex Series and the ALMS during 2002. Robinson Racing twice finished in third place in Rolex, while Riley Racing succeeded in finishing in third place at the 12 Hours of Sebring. Riley & Scott also returned to Europe to enter their latest Mk III in the 24 Hours of Le Mans, but the car was once again unable to endure after its engine failed 13 hours into the race.

Although development of the Mk III C ended in 2003 as Riley Technologies concentrated on their new Daytona Prototype, Mk III Cs continued to be used by a few teams attempting the American Le Mans Series. American Spirit Racing, using a Lincoln-badged V8, entered the full season and had their best finish of fifth at Laguna Seca. Intersport Racing and Jim Matthews Racing also entered select ALMS rounds, but they also competed in two different events in Le Mans. The Matthews car entered the 24 Hours of Le Mans but as in the previous year suffered engine failure, this time after 15 hours. Intersport however entered the 1000 km of Le Mans later that year, but retired with clutch failure after only an hour.

During the 2004 American Le Mans Series season, Mk III Cs ran only two races. Intersport Racing ran alongside newcomer Autocon Motorsports, with the latter finishing the 12 Hours of Sebring in seventh place. Autocon returned on their own at the end of the year, failing to finish the Petit Le Mans. Autocon's 2005 season actually featured more events for the Mk III C, but the team never finished better than seventh. The last race of the 2005 season, the Monterey Sports Car Championships at Laguna Seca, became the final race of the entire Mk III line.

== Variants ==
=== Rafanelli Mk III ===
The Italian Team Rafanelli initially campaigned Mk IIIs in 1998 using BMW V8 powerplants in an attempt to prepare for BMW's launch of the V12 LM in 1999. After Rafanelli was replaced by Schnitzer Motorsport as BMW's supported team, Rafanelli purchased a Judd GV4 V10 for the second of their chassis, #014. Although Riley & Scott was developing their Series 2 upgrades for the Mk III at the time, Rafanelli's design team attempted to modify their own car to better suit the demands of the American Le Mans Series in which the team now planned to compete in 1999.

Nearly all modifications to the Mk III were aerodynamic in nature, concentrating on the nose and rear tail of the bodywork. The nose of the Rafanelli Mk III featured a subtle curve, blending into the horizontal splitter, rather than the static angle used on the standard car. The central air intake at the bottom of the nose was extended outwards, now positioned vertically rather than flush with the nose of the car. At the rear, the tail of the car was extended further than the standard bodywork, and a new design for the rear wing was implemented. The rear fender flares were also extended forward to create a longer transition in the shape of the bodywork.

Rafanelli's Mk III competed throughout the entire 1999 American Le Mans Series season, earning a victory at the Grand Prix of Atlanta. This became the only win scored by a Mk III in the American Le Mans Series. Team Rafanelli ended the season sixth in the Teams Championship before they decided to move on from their Mk III and purchase a Lola B2K/10 prototype the following year.

=== R & M SR01 ===
Italians Paolo Radici and Fabio Montani initially founded the Target 24 squad in 1996, campaigning one of the original Mk III chassis that same year. A Series 2 Mk III chassis was purchased by Montani in 1999 before the team was reorganized in 2000 and became R & M. The team campaigned the Mk III with a Judd GV4 V10 in the FIA Sportscar Championship and even won one race, but increasing competition from other teams as well as a lack of upgrades for the Mk III from Riley & Scott during the 2000 and 2001 seasons led team organizers to begin a project to build their own improved car based on the Mk III.

Started in the middle of the 2001 season, the SR01 project involved the creation of an all-new carbon fiber monocoque to replace the Mk III's mixed steel tube frame and carbon chassis. Elements of the Mk III's construction were however retained so that parts could easily be moved from the Mk III to the SR01. The rear structure of the SR01 was also redesigned around the Judd GV4, while an R & M-designed differential replaced the standard unit. Some aerodynamic improvements were also made to the front bodywork.

R & M's SR01 competed during the entire 2002 FIA Sportscar Championship season, earning several third-place finishes en route to a third-place result in the Teams Championship. The SR01 did not compete again after the 2002 season.

=== Robinson Mk III C ===
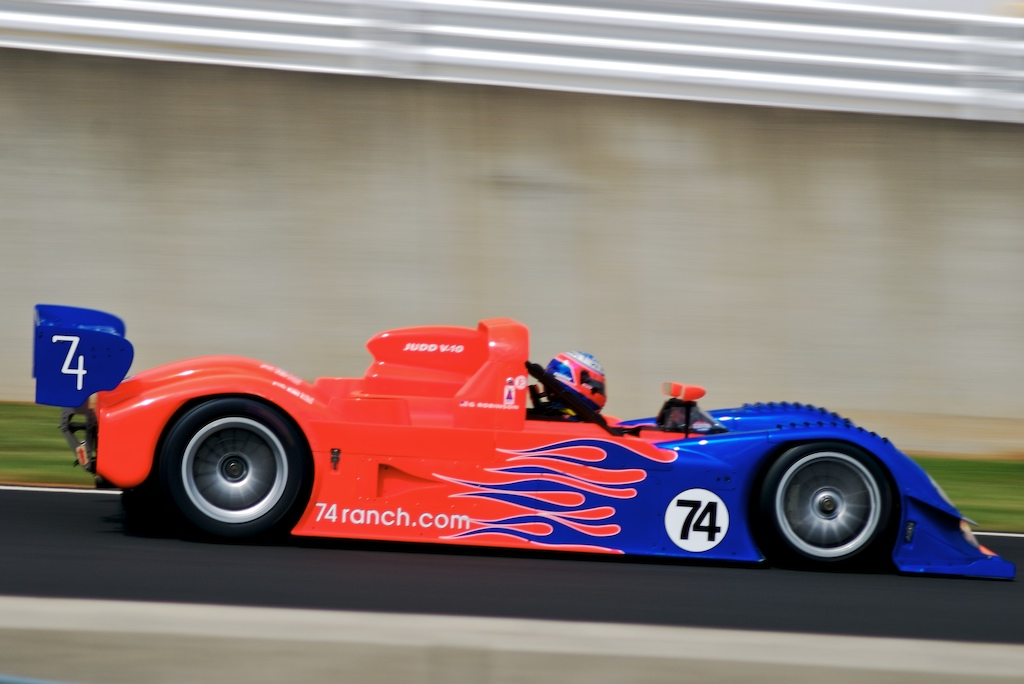
Robinson Racing's Mk III C-Judd

When the Mk III C debuted in 2001, Robinson Racing was amongst the first customers, purchasing chassis #001 and entering it in the Rolex Sports Car Series with a Judd powerplant. The car did not compete until the season finale after an earlier testing accident. The team was not satisfied with the Mk III C's performance and during the off-season began modifications to the Mk III C's design. Automotive designer John Mills was hired by Robinson Racing to improve the aerodynamics of the team's car.

As part of Mills' design, the front end of the car was replaced with entirely new bodywork attempting to resolve two problems. The front radiator was removed and the bodywork opened to allow two wide channels on either side of a shallow nose. These channels fed cooling air into the sides of the car, where new radiators were now located. This not only gave the car better speed in a straight line, but also improved the cooling capabilities of the radiators. The rear end of the car also received design changes, most notably the relocation of the exhaust system. Instead of exiting out of the back of the car, the exhaust was now ejected vertically from towers attached to the front of the rear wheel arches. Robinson Racing's Mk III C debuted at the 2002 24 Hours of Daytona, but did not finish due to gearbox problems. The car competed in three other events that season, twice earning a best finish of third. After 2002 the SRP class no longer competed in the Rolex Sports Car Series and Robinson's Mk III C was retired from competition. Robinson Racing's modified Mk III C is still driven, now entered in several historic racing events. The car now runs a larger 5.0 litre Judd GV5 in place of the older GV4.
