= Peter Gregg =

American racecar driver (1940–1980)

Peter Holden Gregg (May 4, 1940 – December 15, 1980) was an American race car driver during the golden age of the Trans-Am Series and a five-time winner of the 24 Hours of Daytona. He was also the owner of Brumos, a Jacksonville, Florida, car dealership and racing team.

== Background ==
Gregg was born in New York City, the son of a mechanical engineer and manufacturer of marine incinerators.

Gregg graduated from the Deerfield Academy, a private prep school, in 1957 and moved on to Harvard University, where he earned a degree in English in 1961. He had a brief career in filmmaking while also competing as a squash player and then eventually settling on auto racing. After graduating from Harvard, he moved to Europe and attended the Centro-Sud Driving School.

Gregg joined the U.S. Navy and became an air intelligence officer. He was assigned to the Naval Air Station in Jacksonville, Florida, and served at sea aboard the USS Forrestal (CA-59). Discharged in 1965 from the Navy. He was married to Jennifer Johnson and had two sons, Jason and Simon.

Gregg's legacy lives on in the Peter Gregg Foundation.

== Racing career ==
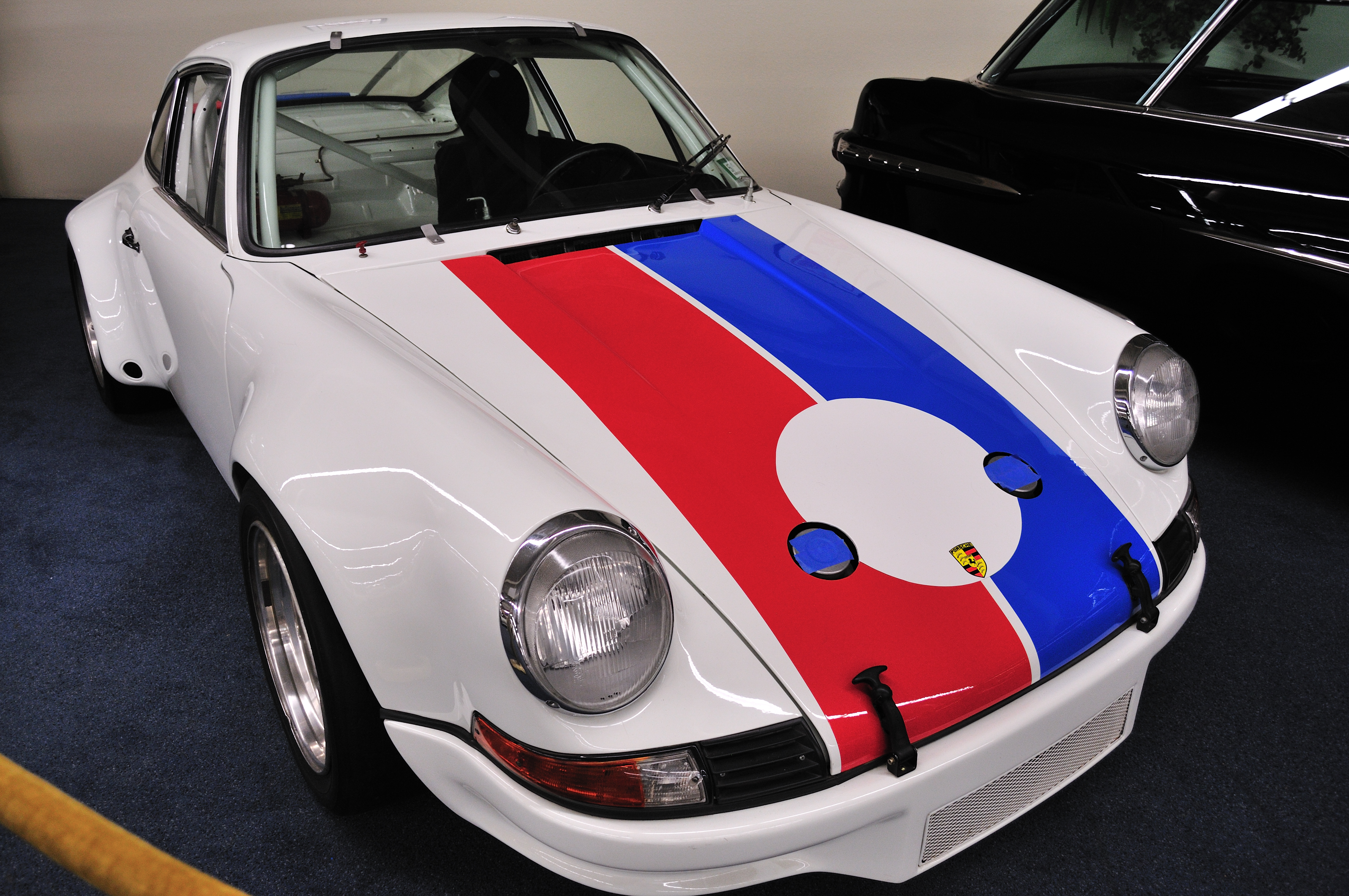
1973 Porsche 911 Carrera RSR of Peter Gregg

While at school, Gregg began his motorsport career in gymkhanas and ice races after an initial appearance in a hill climb in 1958 in Laconia, New Hampshire.

In 1963, Gregg drove an unmodified production Corvette in Osceola County, Florida, and won the SCCA sanctioned race. He became a serious Porsche racer in 1964 with a Porsche 904 and then moved into competition with a Porsche 906. In 1965, he purchased Brumos Porsche, a local dealership, after the death of the owner, Hubert Brundage. He was the SCCA's Southeastern Division champion in 1967 in two classes and scored victories in Daytona and Sebring. In 1968 he acquired a Mercedes-Benz dealership and entered competition in the SCCA's Under-2-Litre section of the Trans-Am Series. He won six Trans-Am races in 1969 and also took the SCCA's B Sedan National Championship. In 1970, he opened a third dealership, SportAuto, selling Fiats and MGs.

In 1971, Gregg was part of the major Trans-Am Series, driving Bud Moore Ford Mustangs, alongside teammate George Follmer. He won the Trans-Am Series in 1973 and 1974 in a Brumos Porsche. By this time, he was involved with IMSA and won the IMSA GTO overall championship in 1971 and 1973, earning him the nickname "Peter Perfect", possibly a reference to a character in a Hanna-Barbera cartoon called the "Wacky Races" and his clean-cut naval officer image. In 1973, he won the 24 Hours of Daytona in a Porsche Carrera co-driven by Hurley Haywood. He then announced his retirement to lead a life as a director of the Jacksonville National Bank, a club tennis player and a speedboat racer out of the Ponte Vedra Yacht Club.

Gregg retracted his retirement and won the 24 Hours of Daytona three more times, in 1975, 1976, and 1978. His 1976 Daytona victory in the #59 BMW E9 Coupe Sport Leicht (CSL) "Batmobile" (the first product of what would become the BMW M Motorsport subsidiary) with co-driver Brian Redman is cited as BMW's first major victory on American soil.

Gregg numbered his cars 59 whenever possible in homage to his Naval career, having served aboard the USS Forrestal whose original ship designation was CA 59.

Gregg won IMSA GTO overall championships in 1974, 1975, 1978, and 1979, giving him six career titles in the class. In June 1980, he was due to compete at the 24 Hours of Le Mans in a 924 Carrera GTS for the Porsche factory team along with fellow American Al Holbert, but was injured near Paris; en route to a practice session for the race, he attempted to overtake an ox cart, but a car pulled out in front of him and, in attempting to avoiding a collision, his car careered into a ditch. Artist Frank Stella was his passenger. When doctors refused to allow Gregg to race, his place was taken by Derek Bell.

Gregg was given clearance to compete at the Paul Revere 250 at Daytona the following month. His partner, Haywood, who was scheduled to drive for most of the race, soon fell ill while leading, leaving Gregg to fill in, but their Porsche fell back, eventually finishing third. Suffering from double vision, he was soon barred from racing by IMSA.

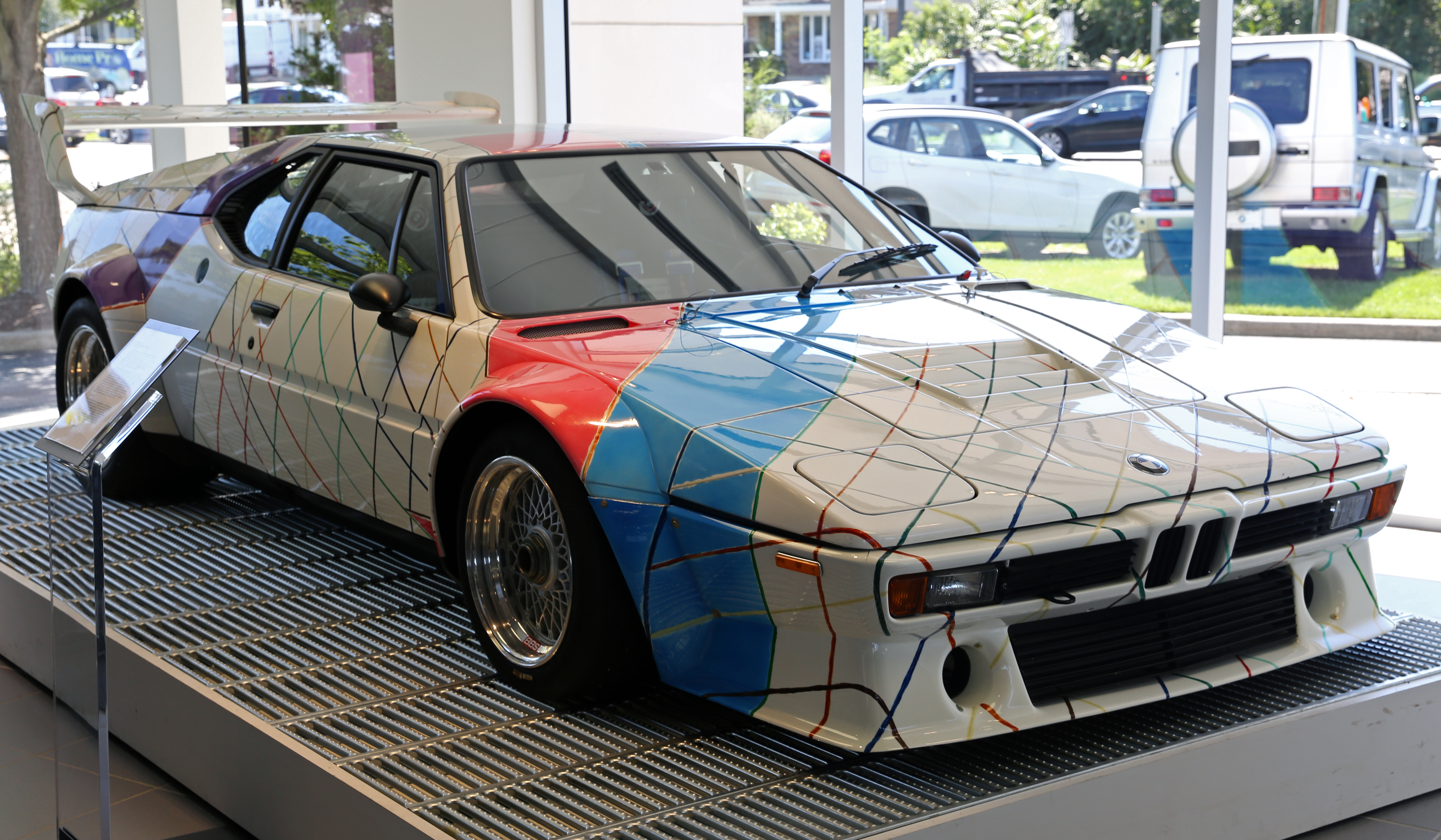
BMW M1 Pro car-painting, 1979 by Frank Stella, commissioned by Gregg

Gregg's success with BMW was rewarded with an invitation to order a BMW M1 Procar Championship supercar from the factory. The Gregg car Frank Stella painted is cited as the only BMW Art Car not owned by the factory (although "unofficial", Stella was an official art car artist). Gregg's widow sold the car in 1990; it was donated to the Guggenheim Museum in 1999 and then sold at the Bonhams 2011 Pebble Beach Concours d'Elegance auction for $854,000 to art collector, car collector, and BMW dealer Jonathan Sobel. the car was later sold to renowned BMW car collector Peter Gleeson

== Death ==
Following his road accident in France on June 10, 1980, Gregg suffered from lingering concussion symptoms that included headaches and double vision for several months.

"Peter had been concerned with a lot of things philosophically," business partner Bob Snodgrass said. "And after the accident that happened in Le Mans, Peter went through a rough period of having to face the reality that he was physically not able to race because of his medical problem."

Gregg qualified 11th for the November 30 250-mile race at Daytona but withdrew before the race, claiming the car suffered handling issues.

After a five-month courtship, Gregg married Deborah Jane Marrs, a 25-year-old commercial artist from Miami, on December 6.

Peter Gregg committed suicide by firearm on December 15, 1980, near the beach south of Jacksonville. In his briefcase, he had left a suicide note that said, in part: “I just don't enjoy life anymore. I must have the right to end it.” Police said that he had recently undergone psychiatric care.

Hurley Haywood, Gregg's close friend, suspects that Gregg's decision was due to multiple factors, "not the least of which was the realization that the man other racers called “Peter Perfect” was no longer the best." New drivers were driving the same kind of car, a Porsche 935, and they were faster. “Peter could not accept the fact that he was not the top dog anymore.”

== Brumos racing after Gregg ==
Gregg's endurance racing partner, Hurley Haywood, assisted Deborah Gregg as she took the position of Owner/CEO at Brumos Motorcars. She became a successful driver in the Trans Am and endurance series driving for Brumos in the '80s. She remarried and sold the dealerships in the mid-'90s.

In 1991, Brumos Porsche entered a two-car Porsche team in the newly created IMSA SuperCar series and won three straight manufacturer's championships for Porsche with a pair of traditional white, red, and blue 911 Turbos. Peter's son Simon later competed as a driver in Trans-Am, the American Le Mans Series and the Grand-Am Series. Simon Gregg campaigns a Chevrolet Corvette under the Derhaag Motorsports banner in the SCCA's GT-1-class. He won the SCCA Southeast Conference Major's Tour GT-1 race at Homestead-Miami Speedway in January 2015, and set a new track record for the GT-1 class.

== Awards ==
- Gregg was inducted into the International Motorsports Hall of Fame in 1992.
- Gregg was inducted in the Motorsports Hall of Fame of America in 2000.

== Motorsports results ==
=== SCCA National Championship Runoffs ===
| Year | Track | Car | Engine | Class | Finish | Start | Status |
|---|---|---|---|---|---|---|---|
| 1967 | Daytona | Porsche 911 | | E Sports Racer | 2 | 3 | Running |
| 1967 | Daytona | Porsche 911 | | B Sedan | 12 | 3 | Retired |
| 1969 | Daytona | Porsche 911 | | B Sedan | 1 | 1 | Running |
| 1970 | Road Atlanta | Porsche 914/6 | | C Production | 8 | 15 | Running |

=== 24 Hours of Le Mans results ===
| Year | Team | Co-drivers | Car | Class | Laps | Pos. | Class pos. |
|---|---|---|---|---|---|---|---|
| 1966 | (Germany) Porsche System Engineering | (Sweden) Sten Axelsson | Porsche 906 Carrera 6 | S 2.0 | 321 | DNF | DNF |
| 1973 | (France) Sonauto BP Racing | (France) Guy Chasseuil | Porsche 911 Carrera RSR | GTS 3.0 | 298 | 14th | 3rd |
| 1976 | (Germany) BMW Motorsport GmbH | (United Kingdom) Brian Redman | BMW 3.0 CSL Turbo | Gr. 5 SP | 23 | DNF | DNF |
| 1977 | (France) JMS Racing (France) ASA Cachia | (France) Claude Ballot-Léna | Porsche 935 | Gr. 5 SP | 315 | 3rd | 1st |
| 1978 | (Germany) Martini Racing Porsche System | (United States) Hurley Haywood (Germany) Reinhold Joest | Porsche 936/77 | Gr. 6 S 3.0 | 362 | 3rd | 3rd |
| 1979 | (France) Charles Pozzi / JMS Racing | (France) Claude Ballot-Léna (France) Michel Leclère | Ferrari 512 BB-LM | IMSA; GTX | 219 | DNF | DNF |
