= Brumos Racing =

American automobile racing team

(United States) Brumos Racing
- Founded: 1971
- Folded: 2014
- Former series: Rolex Sports Car Series, IMSA GT Championship

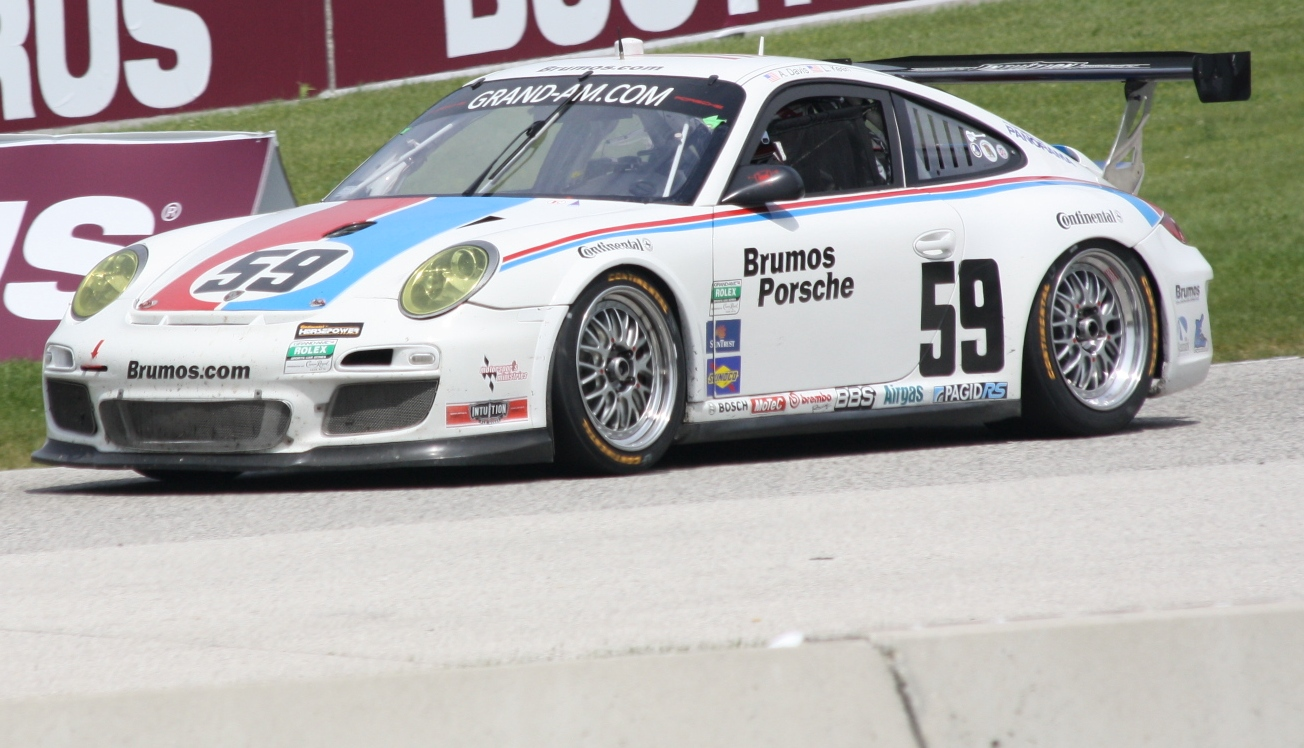
The Brumos Porsche 911 GT3 of Andrew Davis and Leh Keen racing at an event at Road America.

Brumos Racing was an automobile racing team based in Jacksonville, Florida.

== 24 Hours of Daytona wins ==
Brumos has won the 24 Hours of Daytona four times. In 1973, Peter Gregg and Hurley Haywood won with a Porsche Carrera RSR, they repeated in 1975. In 1978 Peter Gregg won a third time with a Porsche 935/77, together with Rolf Stommelen and Toine Hezemans. Thirty-one years later David Donohue, Antonio García, Darren Law and Buddy Rice won the race in a Riley Mk XI with a Porsche engine in the 2009 24 Hours of Daytona.
