= Al Holbert =

American racing driver (1946–1988)

- Holbert in 1987
- Nationality: (United States) American
- Born: Alvah Robert Holbert; 11 November 1946 Abington Township, Pennsylvania, U.S.
- Died: 30 September 1988 (aged 41) Columbus, Ohio, U.S.

Alvah Robert Holbert (November 11, 1946 – September 30, 1988) was an American automobile racing driver who was a five-time champion of the IMSA Camel GT series and the fifth driver to complete the informal triple Crown of endurance racing. He once held the record with the most IMSA race wins at 50.

== Life and career ==
Holbert was born in Abington, Pennsylvania. He was the son of racecar driver Bob Holbert, who also ran a Volkswagen-Porsche dealership in Warrington, PA, near Philadelphia (one of the first Porsche dealerships in the USA). Holbert worked for Roger Penske while studying at Lehigh University, where he graduated with a B.S. in Mechanical Engineering in 1968. Holbert began racing Porsches in the northeast division of the SCCA, racing a C-production Porsche 914/6 against, among others, Bob Tullius (Triumph TR6) and Bob Sharp (Datsun 240Z). In 1971, Holbert scored his first race win in a Porsche and would turn professional in 1974. He would score his first of his two IMSA titles in 1976 and 1977 in a Dekon Monza. Being a Porsche supporter, Holbert allowed Porsche technicians to inspect his Monza, which would eventually lead to Porsche entering the series with turbocharged cars such as the 934 that led to a Porsche dominance for the following years. During that time, Holbert jumped ship to the Stuttgart marque.

From 1976 to 1979, Holbert raced 19 career races in NASCAR. In those 19 races, in which he drove primarily for James Hylton, Holbert scored four top-ten finishes.

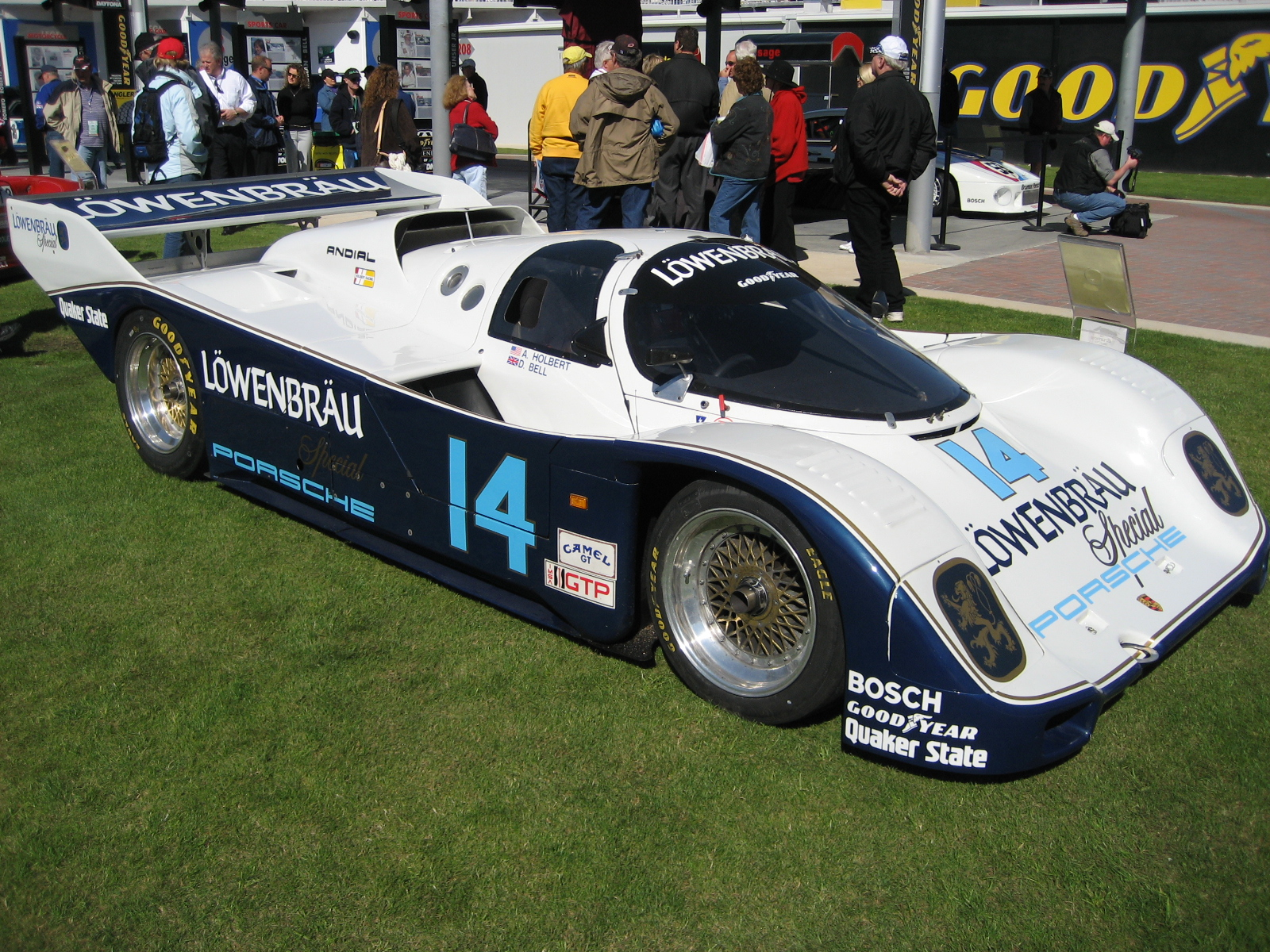
Al Holbert's championship-winning Löwenbräu Special Porsche 962.

Holbert also added an IMSA GTP title during 1983 in a Chevrolet and Porsche powered March 83G when Porsche were unable to make their 956 eligible for competition that year. February 27, 1983, he won the Grand Prix of Miami. Holbert finished fourth in the 1984 Indianapolis 500, and led the Porsche IndyCar effort in 1987–1988. He won the 24 Hours of Le Mans in 1983, 1986, and 1987, the 24 Hours of Daytona in 1986 and 1987 and the 12 Hours of Sebring in 1976 and 1981. Holbert was the head of the Porsche North America's Motorsports Division and ran his own racing team, Holbert Racing. He clinched two more IMSA GTP championships back to back in both 1985 and 1986 driving a Lowenbrau sponsored Porsche 962. In 1988, Holbert realised that the Porsche 962 that had brought him success in his earlier years was becoming outmoded by the newer generation of racers from the likes of the Jaguar XJR-9 and the Electramotive's Nissan GTP ZX-Turbo. His plan was to build an open top Porsche-engined racer for customer teams. Porsche eventually built such a car nearly a decade later, although the WSC-95 would never be built for customer teams as Holbert and Porsche intended.

== Death and afterwards ==
On September 30, 1988, Holbert was at the IMSA Columbus Ford Dealers 500. That evening, Holbert was fatally injured when his privately owned propeller driven Piper PA-60 aircraft crashed shortly after takeoff near Columbus, Ohio, when a clamshell door was not closed. At the end of the season, the team was disbanded and IMSA would retire his race number 14.

Former Holbert Racing chief mechanic Kevin Doran later became a noted team owner. Son, Todd Holbert was also a mechanic, and is currently with Toyota developing their NASCAR Tundra and Camry vehicles.

== Awards ==
Holbert was inducted into the International Motorsports Hall of Fame in 1993.
He was inducted into the Motorsports Hall of Fame of America in 1993.

== Gallery ==
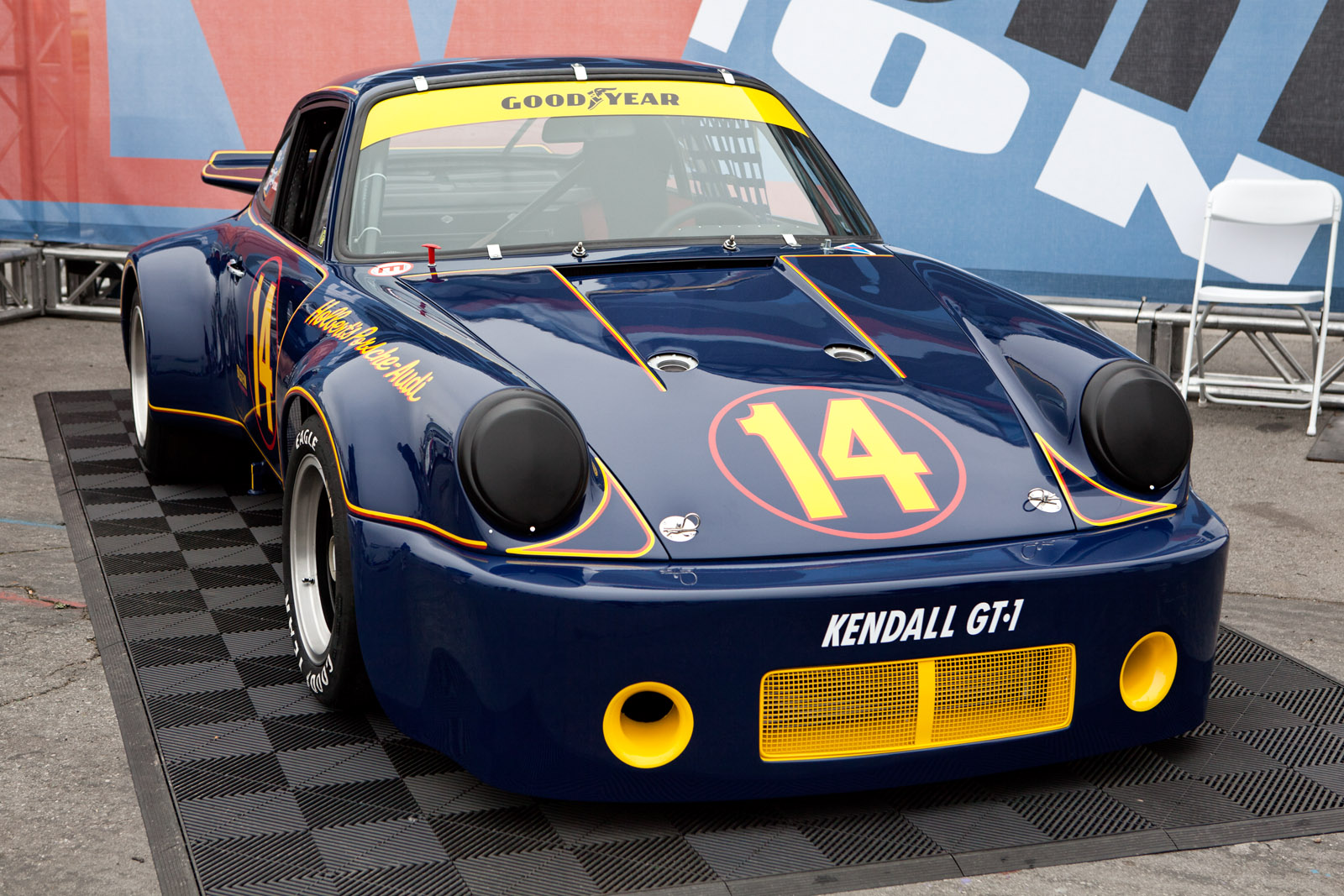
Holbert's 1974 Porsche 911 Carrera RSR 3.0 on static display at the Porsche Rennsport Reunion IV

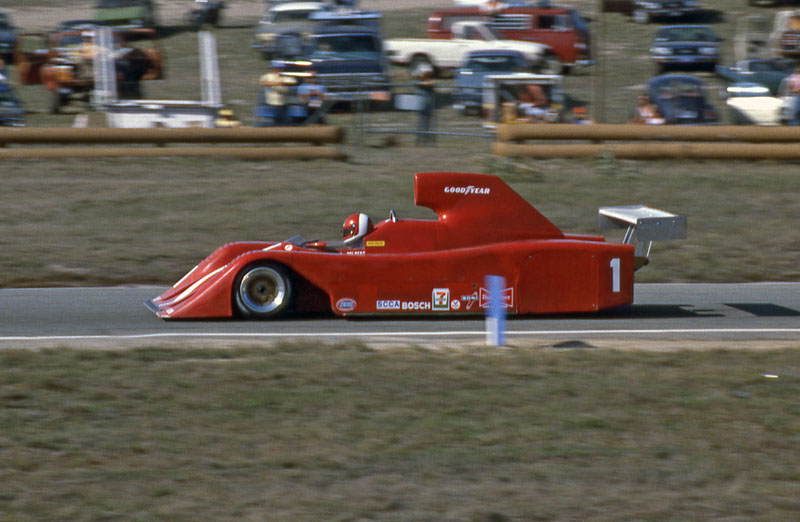
Holbert driving a VDS in the 1982 Can-Am.

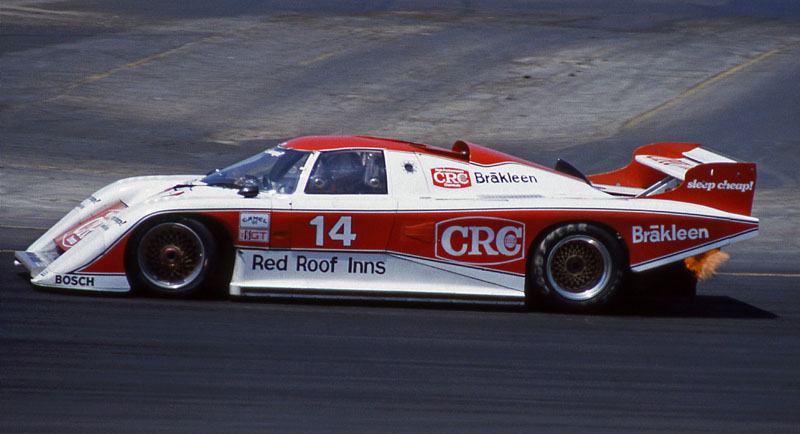
Holbert in a March 83G-Porsche in 1983.

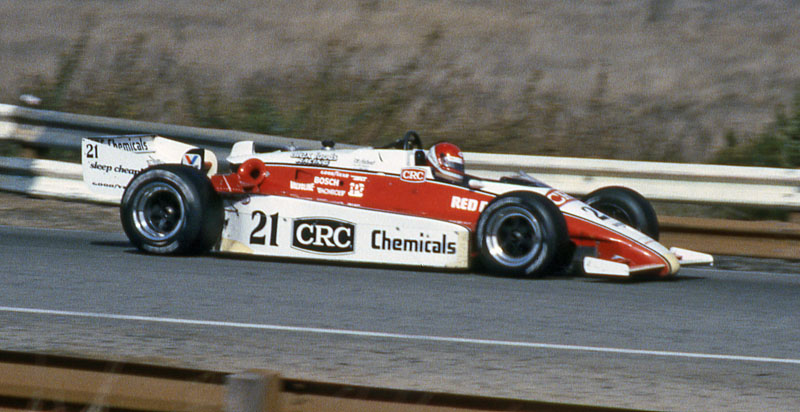
Holbert drove a March 84C in the 1984 CART series.

== Racing record ==
=== SCCA National Championship Runoffs ===
Year	Track	Car	Engine	Class	Finish	Start	Status
1971	Road Atlanta	Porsche 914/6	Porsche	C Production	16	6	Retired
1972	Road Atlanta	Porsche 914/6	Porsche	C Production	4	4	Running

=== Complete 24 Hours of Le Mans results ===
Year	Class	Tyres	Car	Team	Co-Drivers	Laps	Pos.	Class Pos.
1977	S +2.0	G	Inaltera LM77; Ford Cosworth DFV 3.0L V8	(France) Inaltera	(France) Jean-Pierre Beltoise	275	13th	5th
1980	GTP	D	Porsche 924 Carrera GT; Porsche 2.0L Turbo I4	(Germany) Porsche System	(United Kingdom) Derek Bell	305	13th	6th
1982	C	D	Porsche 956; Porsche Type-935 2.6L Turbo Flat-6	(Germany) Rothmans Porsche System	(United States) Hurley Haywood (Germany) Jürgen Barth	340	3rd	3rd
1983	C	D	Porsche 956; Porsche Type-935 2.6L Turbo Flat-6	(Germany) Rothmans Porsche	(Australia) Vern Schuppan (United States) Hurley Haywood	370	1st	1st
1985	C1	D	Porsche 962C; Porsche Type-935 2.6L Turbo Flat-6	(Germany) Rothmans Porsche	(Australia) Vern Schuppan (United Kingdom) John Watson	299	DNF	DNF
1986	C1	D	Porsche 962C; Porsche Type-935 2.6L Turbo Flat-6	(Germany) Rothmans Porsche	(United Kingdom) Derek Bell (Germany) Hans-Joachim Stuck	368	1st	1st
1987	C1	D	Porsche 962C; Porsche Type-935 3.0L Turbo Flat-6	(Germany) Rothmans Porsche	(Germany) Hans-Joachim Stuck (United Kingdom) Derek Bell	355	1st	1st

=== American open–wheel racing results ===
(key)

==== CART ====
Year	Team	1	2	3	4	5	6	7	8	9	10	11	12	13	14	15	16	Rank	Points	Ref
1984	Alex Morales Motorsports	LBH; 15	PHX1; 23	INDY; 4	MIL; 20	POR; 24	MEA; 5	CLE; 7	MIS1; 19	ROA; 22	POC; 29	MDO; 17	SAN	MIS2; 13	PHX2; 22	LS; 22	LVG; DNS	18th	28	
1987	Porsche Motorsports	LBH	PHX	INDY	MIL	POR	MEA	CLE	TOR	MIS	POC	ROA	MDO	NAZ	LS	MIA; DNQ		NC	-	

Preceded by Jacky Ickx; Derek Bell	Winner of the 24 Hours of Le Mans; 1983 with: Vern Schuppan; Hurley Haywood	Succeeded by Klaus Ludwig; Henri Pescarolo
Preceded by Klaus Ludwig; Paolo Barilla; Louis Krages	Winner of the 24 Hours of Le Mans; 1986 with: Derek Bell; Hans-Joachim Stuck	Succeeded by Derek Bell; Hans-Joachim Stuck; Al Holbert
Preceded by Derek Bell; Hans-Joachim Stuck; Al Holbert	Winner of the 24 Hours of Le Mans; 1987 with: Derek Bell; Hans-Joachim Stuck	Succeeded by Jan Lammers; Johnny Dumfries; Andy Wallace
