= List of IMSA SportsCar Championship circuits =

List of autoracing series circuits

The following is a list of circuits that have hosted International Motor Sports Association (IMSA) SportsCar Championship races from the inaugural season in 1971 up to and including the 2024 season. The list includes the combined IMSA history of races held as part of the IMSA GT Championship, the Grand-Am Rolex Sports Car Series, the American Le Mans Series and the current WeatherTech SportsCar Championship.

Several nations have hosted a race, including the United States, Canada, Mexico, Australia, Spain, Germany and the United Kingdom. Daytona International Speedway has hosted the series in 53 of its 55 seasons, the most of any track. The 11 tracks which will host a race in the 2025 season, are listed in bold.

Road course
Street circuit
Combined oval road course

Track	Map	IMSA GT	Grand-Am	American Le Mans Series	WeatherTech	Races	Seasons
(United States) **Daytona International Speedway**^{†}		1971–1997	2000–2013		2014–present	93 (Note: Held two races in 1972, 1974, 1984–1986, 1996, 2000–2001, 2004–2010, 2020; held three races in 1973, 1975–1983, and 2002–2003. The 1998 and 1999 races were held as part of the SCCA USRRC.)	53
(United States) **Sebring International Raceway**^{†}		1973; 1975–1998		1999–2013	2014–present	55 (Note: Held two races in 1997, 1998 and 2020. The 1971 and 1972 races were held as part of the FIA WSC.)	52
(United States) **Road Atlanta**^{†}		1973–1992; 1994–1998	2013	1999–2013	2014–present	65 (Note: Held two races in 1976–1982, 1987, 1991, 1998–1999, 2003, 2005, 2013 and 2020.)	51
(United States) **WeatherTech Raceway Laguna Seca**^{†}		1974–1987; 1989; 1991–1994; 1997–1998	2005–2009; 2011–2013	1999–2013	2014–present	58 (Note: Held two races in 1976, 1977, 2005–2009 and 2011–2013.)	48
(United States) Lime Rock Park		1972–1998	2000–2001; 2006–2008; 2010–2013	2004–2013	2015–2019, 2021–2023	61 (Note: Held two races in 1986–1992, 2006–2008 and 2010–2013. A 1999 race was held as part of the SCCA USRRC.)	47
(United States) Mid-Ohio Sports Car Course		1972–1979; 1981–1993	2000–2001; 2003–2013	2001–2002; 2004–2012	2018–2022	55 (Note: Held two races in 1975–1977, 1982, 2001 and 2004–2012. The 1998 and 1999 races were held as part of the SCCA USRRC.)	40
(United States) **Road America**^{†}		1979–1993	2000–2001; 2011–2013	2002–2013	2014–present	43 (Note: Held two races in 2011–2013.)	40
(United States) **Watkins Glen International**^{†}		1972; 1984–1997	2000–2013		2014–2019, 2021–present	62 (Note: Held two races in 1984–1991, 2001–2004, 2006–2012 and 2021; held three races in 2005. The 1998 race was held as part of the SCCA USRRC.)	39
(Canada) **Canadian Tire Motorsport Park**^{†}		1975; 1980–1983; 1989–1992; 1995–1998		1999–2013	2014–2019, 2022—present	37 (Note: 1976–1977 and 1984–1985 races were held as part of the FIA WSC.)	37
(United States) Sonoma Raceway		1976–1990; 1995–1997	2006–2008	1999–2005		28	28
(United States) **Virginia International Raceway**^{†}		1971–1972	2002–2011	2012–2013	2014–present	25	25
(United States) Portland International Raceway		1978–1994		1999–2001; 2004–2006		23	23
(United States) **Long Beach Street Circuit**^{†}		1990–1991	2006	2007–2013	2014–2019, 2021–present	20	20
(United States) Homestead–Miami Speedway			2000–2012			14 (Note: Held two races in 2004. The 1998 race was held as part of the SCCA USRRC.)	13
(United States) Streets of Miami		1983–1993		2002–2003		13	13
(United States) Detroit Belle Isle Street Circuit			2012–2013	2007–2008	2014–2019, 2021–2022	12	12
(United States) Barber Motorsports Park			2003–2013			11	11
(United States) Phoenix Raceway		1992–1995	2000–2006			11	11
(United States) Riverside International Raceway		1975; 1979–1987				10	10
(United States) Charlotte Motor Speedway		1971, 1974; 1982–1986		2000	2020	10	10
(United States) Brainerd International Raceway		1972; 1977–1983				8	8
(United States) Pocono Raceway		1973; 1976–1977; 1981–1985				8	8
(Canada) Circuit Gilles Villeneuve	Montreal		2007–2012			6	6
(United States) Del Mar Fairgrounds		1987–1992				6	6
(United States) Talladega Superspeedway		1971–1972; 1974–1976; 1978				6	6
(United States) West Palm Beach Street Circuit		1986–1991				6	6
(United States) Miller Motorsports Park			2006–2010	2006–2010		10 (Note: Held two races in 2006–2010.)	5
(United States) Circuit of the Americas	Austin		2013	2013	2014–2017	6 (Note: Held two races in 2013.)	5
(Mexico) Autódromo Hermanos Rodríguez		1974	2005–2008			5	5
(United States) New Jersey Motorsports Park			2008–2012			5	5
(United States) Summit Point Raceway		1971, 1982; 1987–1989				5	5
(United States) **Indianapolis Motor Speedway**^{†}			2012–2013		2014, 2023–present	5	5
(United States) Auto Club Speedway	California		2002–2005			4	4
(United States) Columbus Street Circuit		1985–1988				4	4
(United States) Las Vegas Motor Speedway		1997–1998		1999–2000		4	4
(Canada) Circuit Mont-Tremblant			2002–2005			4	4
(United States) San Antonio Street Circuit		1987–1990				4	4
(Canada) Trois-Rivières Street Circuit			2000-2001	2002–2003		4	4
(United States) Baltimore Street Circuit				2011–2013		3	3
(United States) Hallett Motor Racing Circuit		1977–1979				3	3
(United States) Heartland Park Topeka		1989–1991				3	3
(United States) New Orleans Street Circuit		1991–1992; 1995				3	3
(United States) Texas World Speedway		1972; 1995–1996				3	3
(United States) St. Petersburg Street Circuit				2007–2009		3	3
(United States) **Detroit Street Circuit**^{†}					2024-present	2	2
(United States) Houston Street Circuit				2006–2007		2	2
(United States) Indianapolis Raceway Park		1973, 1994				2	2
(United States) Kansas Speedway			2013		2014	2	2
(United States) Mid-America Raceway		1975, 1977				2	2
(United States) Ontario Motor Speedway		1974, 1976				2	2
(United States) Tampa Street Circuit		1989–1990				2	2
(United States) Texas Motor Speedway				2000–2001		2	2
(Australia) Adelaide Street Circuit				2000		1	1
(United States) Atlanta Motor Speedway		1993				1	1
(United States) Bridgehampton Circuit		1971				1	1
(United States) Iowa Speedway			2007			1	1
(United States) Bryar Motorsports Park		1972				1	1
(United States) Dallas Street Circuit		1996				1	1
(United Kingdom) Donington Park				2001		1	1
(United States) Firebird International Raceway		1987				1	1
(Canada) Halifax Street Circuit		1995				1	1
(Spain) Circuito del Jarama				2001		1	1
(United States) Meadowlands Street Circuit		1990				1	1
(United States) Michigan International Speedway		1984				1	1
(Germany) Nürburgring				2000		1	1
(United States) Pikes Peak International Raceway		1997				1	1
(United Kingdom) Silverstone Circuit				2000		1	1
(United States) Washington Street Circuit				2002		1	1

== See also ==
- List of IMSA GT Championship circuits
- List of American Le Mans Series circuits
- List of World Sportscar Championship circuits
- List of Can-Am Challenge Cup circuits
