= List of IMSA GT Championship circuits =

The IMSA GT Championship raced on 44 different circuits in its 28-year history.

| Circuit | Type | Location | Seasons | Races | Map |
|---|---|---|---|---|---|
| Atlanta Motor Speedway | Roval | Hampton, Georgia | 1993 | 1 | |
| Autódromo Magdalena Mixhuca | Race circuit | Mexico City, Mexico | 1974 | 1 | |
| Brainerd International Raceway; Donnybrooke Speedway | Race circuit | Brainerd, Minnesota | 1972, 1977–1983 | 8 | |
| Bridgehampton Circuit | Race circuit | Bridgehampton, New York | 1971 | 1 | |
| Bryar Motorsports Park | Race circuit | Loudon, New Hampshire | 1972 | 1 | |
| Charlotte Motor Speedway | Roval | Concord, North Carolina | 1971, 1974, 1982–1986 | 8 | |
| Columbus Street Circuit | Street circuit | Columbus, Ohio | 1985–1988 | 4 | |
| Dallas Street Circuit | Street circuit | Dallas, Texas | 1996 | 1 | |
| Daytona International Speedway | Roval | Daytona Beach, Florida | 1971–1997 | 53 (Note: Held two races in 1972, 1974, 1984–86, and 1996; held three races in 1973 and 1975–83.) | |
| Del Mar Fairgrounds | Street circuit | Del Mar, California | 1987–1992 | 6 | |
| Firebird International Raceway | Race circuit | Chandler, Arizona | 1987 | 1 | |
| Halifax Street Circuit | Street circuit | Halifax, Nova Scotia | 1995 | 1 | |
| Hallett Motor Racing Circuit | Race circuit | Hallett, Oklahoma | 1977–1979 | 3 | |
| Heartland Park Topeka | Race circuit | Topeka, Kansas | 1989–1991 | 3 | |
| Indianapolis Raceway Park | Race circuit | Clermont, Indiana | 1973, 1994 | 2 | |
| Laguna Seca Raceway | Race circuit | Monterey, California | 1974–1987, 1989, 1991–1994, 1997–1998 | 24 (Note: Held two races in 1976 and 1977.) | |
| Las Vegas Motor Speedway | Roval | Clark County, Nevada | 1997–1998 | 2 | |
| Lime Rock Park | Race circuit | Lakeville, Connecticut | 1972–1998 | 34 (Note: Held two races in 1986–92.) | |
| Long Beach Street Circuit | Street circuit | Long Beach, California | 1990–1991 | 2 | |
| Meadowlands Street Circuit | Street circuit | East Rutherford, New Jersey | 1990 | 1 | |
| Miami Street Circuit | Street circuit | Miami, Florida | 1983–1993 | 11 | |
| Michigan International Speedway | Roval | Brooklyn, Michigan | 1984 | 1 | |
| Mid-America Raceway | Race circuit | Wentzville, Missouri | 1975, 1977 | 2 | |
| Mid-Ohio Sports Car Course | Race circuit | Troy Township, Morrow County, Ohio | 1972–1979, 1981–1993 | 26 (Note: Held two races in 1975–77 and 1982.) | |
| Mosport International Raceway | Race circuit | Bowmanville, Ontario | 1975, 1980–1983, 1989–1992, 1995–1998 | 13 | |
| New Orleans Street Circuit | Street circuit | New Orleans, Louisiana | 1991–1992, 1995 | 3 | |
| Ontario Motor Speedway | Roval | Ontario, California | 1974, 1976 | 2 | |
| Phoenix International Raceway | Roval | Phoenix, Arizona | 1992–1995 | 4 | |
| Pikes Peak International Raceway | Roval | Fountain, Colorado | 1997 | 1 | |
| Pocono Raceway | Roval | Long Pond, Pennsylvania | 1973, 1976–1977, 1981–1985 | 8 | |
| Portland International Raceway | Race circuit | Portland, Oregon | 1978–1994 | 17 | |
| Road America | Race circuit | Elkhart Lake, Wisconsin | 1979–1993 | 15 | |
| Road Atlanta | Race circuit | Braselton, Georgia | 1973–1992, 1994–1998 | 35 (Note: Held two races in 1976–82, 1987, 1991, and 1998.) | |
| Riverside International Raceway | Race circuit | Riverside, California | 1975, 1979–1987 | 10 | |
| San Antonio Street Circuit | Street circuit | San Antonio, Texas | 1987–1990 | 4 | |
| Sears Point Raceway | Race circuit | Sonoma, California | 1976–1990, 1995–1997 | 18 | |
| Sebring International Raceway | Race circuit | Sebring, Florida | 1973, 1975–1998 | 27 (Note: Held two races in 1997 and 1998.) | |
| Summit Point Raceway | Race circuit | Summit Point, West Virginia | 1971, 1982, 1987–1989 | 5 | |
| Talladega Superspeedway | Roval | Talladega, Alabama | 1971–1972, 1974–1976, 1978 | 6 | |
| Tampa Street Circuit | Street circuit | Tampa, Florida | 1989–1990 | 2 | |
| Texas World Speedway | Roval | College Station, Texas | 1972, 1995–1996 | 3 | |
| Virginia International Raceway | Race circuit | Danville, Virginia | 1971–1972 | 2 | |
| Watkins Glen International Raceway | Race circuit | Watkins Glen, New York | 1972, 1984–1997 | 24 (Note: Held two races in 1984–91.) | |
| West Palm Beach Street Circuit | Street circuit | West Palm Beach, Florida | 1986–1991 | 6 | |
