= IMSA =

North American auto racing sanctioning body

International Motor Sports Association
- Sport: Motorsport
- Jurisdiction: North America; United States and Canada
- Abbreviation: IMSA
- Founded: 1969; 57 years ago
- Affiliation: ACCUS-FIA
- Owner: NASCAR
- Headquarters: Daytona Beach, Florida
- President: John Doonan
- Chairman: Jim France
- CEO: Ed Bennett
- Vice presidents: Simon Hodgson (Competition); Brandon Huddleston (Marketing)

Official website
- www.imsa.com
- (United States)
- (Canada)

The International Motor Sports Association (IMSA) is a North American sports car racing sanctioning body based in Daytona Beach, Florida, under the jurisdiction of the ACCUS arm of the FIA. It was started by John Bishop, a former executive director of SCCA (Sports Car Club of America), and his wife Peggy in 1969 with help from Bill France Sr. of NASCAR. Beginning in 2014, IMSA is the sanctioning body of the IMSA SportsCar Championship, the premier series resulting from the merger of Grand-Am Road Racing and the American Le Mans Series. IMSA is owned by NASCAR Holdings, as a subsidiary company with a designated board of directors.

== History ==
=== John Bishop and SCCA ===
John Bishop, a Sikorsky employee, first became involved in motorsport in the 1950s when he met Dave Allen, a Sports Car Club of America (SCCA) staff member. Allen offered Bishop a management position on the SCCA Contest Board, which Bishop quickly accepted. Bishop moved to Westport, Connecticut shortly thereafter. Bishop's duties consisted of defining technical rules and general administration of SCCA competition, as well as providing artwork for many of the club's magazines and event programmes. He became well known in the motorsport scene and enjoyed a good relationship with the organization's president and Kimberly-Clark heir, James H. Kimberly.

In 1958, things changed for Bishop as the SCCA experienced internal changes. A new executive director position was created, to which each regional executive reported. This position was taken by Hugo Rush, who later became instrumental in Allen's departure. Although Bishop's relationship with Rush was not good, Bishop gained a vast amount of experience and began to show his qualities as a manager.

Rush would later depart due to his disagreement with the club as it moved to promote professional motor sports. Bishop took his place as executive director and was now responsible for both amateur and professional programs. To ensure a more serious level of competition, he was tasked with rewriting the technical rules for the newly formed Pro Racing program.

The SCCA had now taken the big step up to professional racing. By 1962, the SCCA was tasked with managing major World Championship for Makes rounds, particularly at Daytona, Sebring, Bridgehampton and Watkins Glen. The club was also involved in the United States Grand Prix. Bishop helped to create the USRRC (United States Road Racing Championship) series for Group 7 sports cars to recover races that had been taken by rival United States Auto Club (USAC). Bishop was also instrumental in founding the SCCA Trans-Am series and the SCCA/CASC Can–Am series.

In 1969, the tension and in-fighting caused Bishop to resign.

=== Beginnings ===
Original logo, used from 1969 to 2013

Bill France Sr. was instrumental in the creation of the International Motor Sports Association. France founded NASCAR as a professional oval track series and wanted to do the same for road racing. After discussions with Bishop, IMSA was born and Bishop was given the sole control of the organization (like NASCAR, there was no board of directors). France financed the majority of the organization and owned 75% of the stock; Bishop owned the remaining 25%. The articles of incorporation were filed in Connecticut on June 23, 1969.

The first race to be organized by IMSA was a Formula Vee and Formula Ford event at Pocono Raceway in October 1969. The SCCA threatened the circuit management and asked them to block IMSA from racing there. The event was held, although IMSA had to pay an additional $10,000 in rental fees. The race had an attendance of 328 spectators.

The organization soldiered on despite the small crowds, and another ten races were planned. Bill France, suffering from financial setbacks, brought on new investors to take over part of his stake in the series.

=== GT era ===
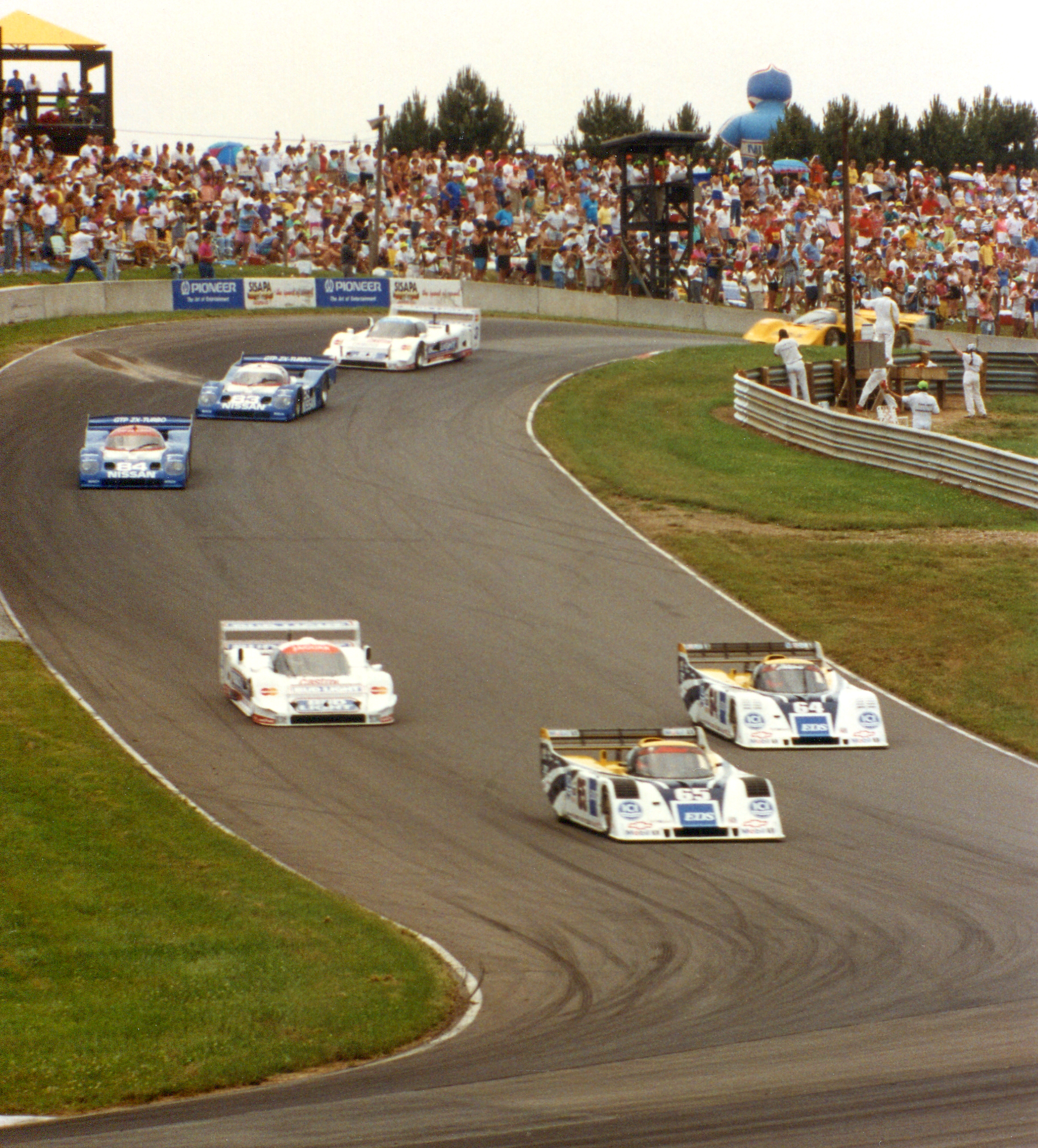
(front to rear) Tommy Kendall and Wayne Taylor (both driving an Intrepid RM-1) leads eventual winner Davy Jones (Jaguar XJR-16) and Chip Robinson, followed by Geoff Brabham (both in Nissan NPT-90), Raul Boesel (XJR-16) and James Weaver (Porsche 962) in the Nissan Grand Prix of Ohio, at Mid-Ohio Sports Car Course, 1991

At the end of the 1970 season, Bishop helped to establish the foundations of the FIA (Fédération Internationale de l'Automobile) "J appendix" for World Championship for Makes sports cars. For the end of the 1970 season, he advertised a new championship for Group 2 and Group 4 cars with equity between competitors.

The 1971 Grand Touring (GT) season introduced international endurance racing to North America. In 1972, Camel Cigarettes became the new sponsor of the GT series and the sedan series became known as the BFGoodrich Radial Challenge. In 1973, the 12 Hours of Sebring joined the IMSA GT Championship's schedule. Later that year, the organization gained recognition from the ACCUS and the FIA. IMSA was scheduled to sanction the 1974 24 Hours of Daytona, but the race was cancelled because of the oil crisis.

Bishop did not believe that factory teams would stick with the new series, so he tried to ensure that the rules were not biased in their favor. He was in favor of looking after privateer teams and helping them to become competitive. As European cars began to dominate, a new series was formed in 1975 called All American Grand Touring (AAGT) to give equal latitude to foreign cars. Turbocharged cars were permitted in 1977.

In the same year, Bishop invited a pair of Jean Rondeau-built Inaltera's to compete as "special prototypes". They became the foundation of the newly formed Grand Touring Prototype (GTP) category in 1981, with rules similar to but separate from the FIA's new Group C (Bishop was unhappy with the strict fuel consumption formula of the latter).

In 1984, Fédération Internationale de l'Automobile (FISA), the organizers of the World Endurance Championship (WEC), attempted to unite the two organizations by scrapping the existing formula and adopting IMSA rules. This did not please Porsche, which was spending vast sums of money on engine development at the time. Porsche responded by boycotting the 24 Hours of Le Mans of that year. FISA responded by abandoning the rule change for the time being.

In 1987, FISA president Jean-Marie Balestre almost made a successful attempt to settle the dispute by announcing that turbochargers and fuel restrictions would be phased out by 1989 (excepting naturally aspirated engines below 3.5 liters). This attempt failed, as did another in 1991, in which with chassis ballast penalties for turbocharged cars rendered them uncompetitive, except at Le Mans.

IMSA continued to have success with its own Camel GT series.

==== New ownership ====
In 1987, John Bishop had to undergo a Coronary artery bypass surgery, forcing him to rethink his priorities. He began to realise that the Camel GT series was in danger of becoming oriented toward the factory-backed teams and less to the privateers as Bishop originally intended. Rules were modified to accommodate the factory teams, which wanted to get into the series, despite Bishop's belief that such changes would be unfavorable to the series in the long run, especially if they failed to meet their objectives.

In January 1989, the Bishops sold the company to Mike Cone and Jeff Parker, owners of the IMSA Grand Prix of St. Petersburg. Bishop shortly stepped down as the organisation's president in favor of Mark Raffauf, his deputy president and the organisation's representative on the ACCUS (Automobile Competition Committee for the United States), an FIA recognised sporting body. Cone and Parker in turn sold the organization to businessman Charles Slater by the early 1990s.

In 1996 Slater sold the organization with previously accumulated debt to Roberto Muller (ex-CEO of Reebok) and Wall Street based portfolio manager for Bill Gates, Andy Evans, who also was an IndyCar owner and owner/driver of the Scandia World Sports Car team. These changes would lead to the departure of many of the executive board members. Evans was responsible for the name change to Professional Sports Car Racing (PSCR).

In 1998 the United States Road Racing Championship was revived as an alternative to Professional Sports Car Racing, involving the Sports Car Club of America and headed by a group of competitors and ex-IMSA personnel, including John Bishop, Bill France Jr., Rob Dyson, Roger Penske, Skip Barber, and Ralph Sanchez. They wanted to keep rules within the United States. When this initially failed, as a result Don Panoz and Barber departed to affiliate themselves with PSCR.

=== American Le Mans Series era ===
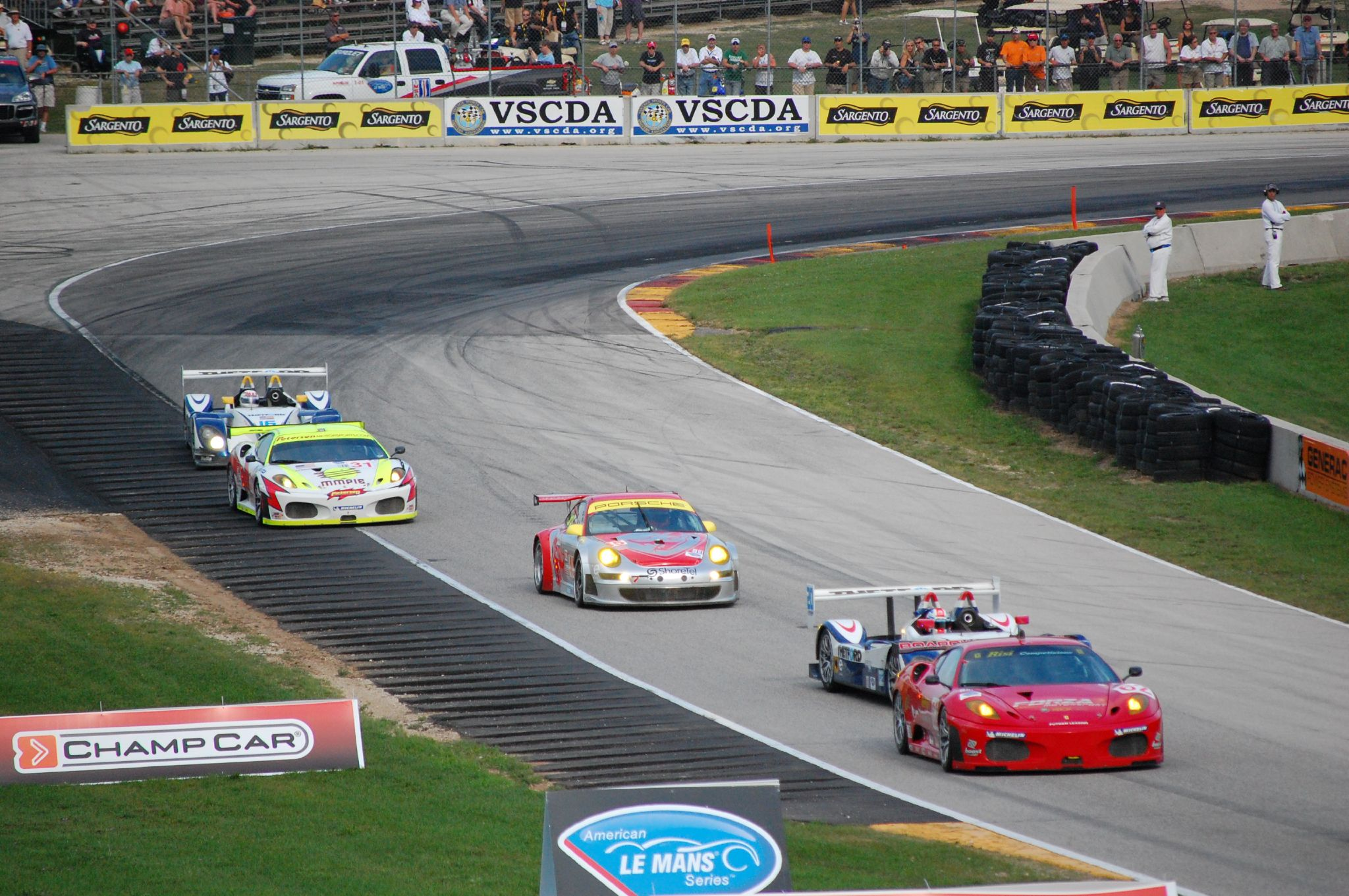
American Le Mans Series at Road America, 2007

In the spring of 1998, Don Panoz created a partnership with the Automobile Club de l'Ouest (ACO), the organizers of the 24 Hours of Le Mans, to begin a 10-hour race in the spirit of Le Mans, dubbed the Petit Le Mans to be held at Panoz's Road Atlanta facility. After the success of the inaugural Petit Le Mans as a part of the 1998 IMSA GT Championship, Panoz announced a new full season championship for 1999, to be known as the American Le Mans Series (ALMS) which adopted the ACO's rulebook under PSCR sanction. The new series replaced the Professional Sports Car Racing championship as PSCR's headline series.

Under tremendous pressure from team owners and management, Evans sold Professional Sports Car Racing to Don Panoz in 2001, to solidify the American Le Mans Series. Don Panoz renamed the sanctioning organization back to the International Motor Sports Association and was the official sanctioning body of the ALMS, as well as its support series, the Prototype Lites, the Star Mazda series, GT3 Cup Challenge and the Panoz GT Pro series. IMSA became part of Panoz Motorsports Group, which included the ALMS, Elan Motorsports Technology and Mosport, Sebring and Road Atlanta race tracks. Scott Atherton was appointed President of Panoz Motorsports Group and he appointed Tim Mayer to manage IMSA. IMSA's main series, the ALMS focused on manufacturer entries along with top privateers with the worldwide prestige of championship greatly increasing.

After the 1999 USRRC season was cancelled halfway through its schedule due to a lack of competitors, a second attempt at a new sports car sanction body known as the Grand-Am Road Racing was created with full support of NASCAR's France family and other motorsports notables and had its inaugural season in 2000. Grand-Am struggled early on, but proved to be a formidable competitor to the ALMS in later years with a different philosophy based on lower-tech cars, most notably its prototype category Daytona Prototype, giving larger fields and closer competition. Much like the split between Champ Car and the IRL, this split was seen by many as being detrimental to the sport as a whole.

=== Purchase by NASCAR and reunification ===
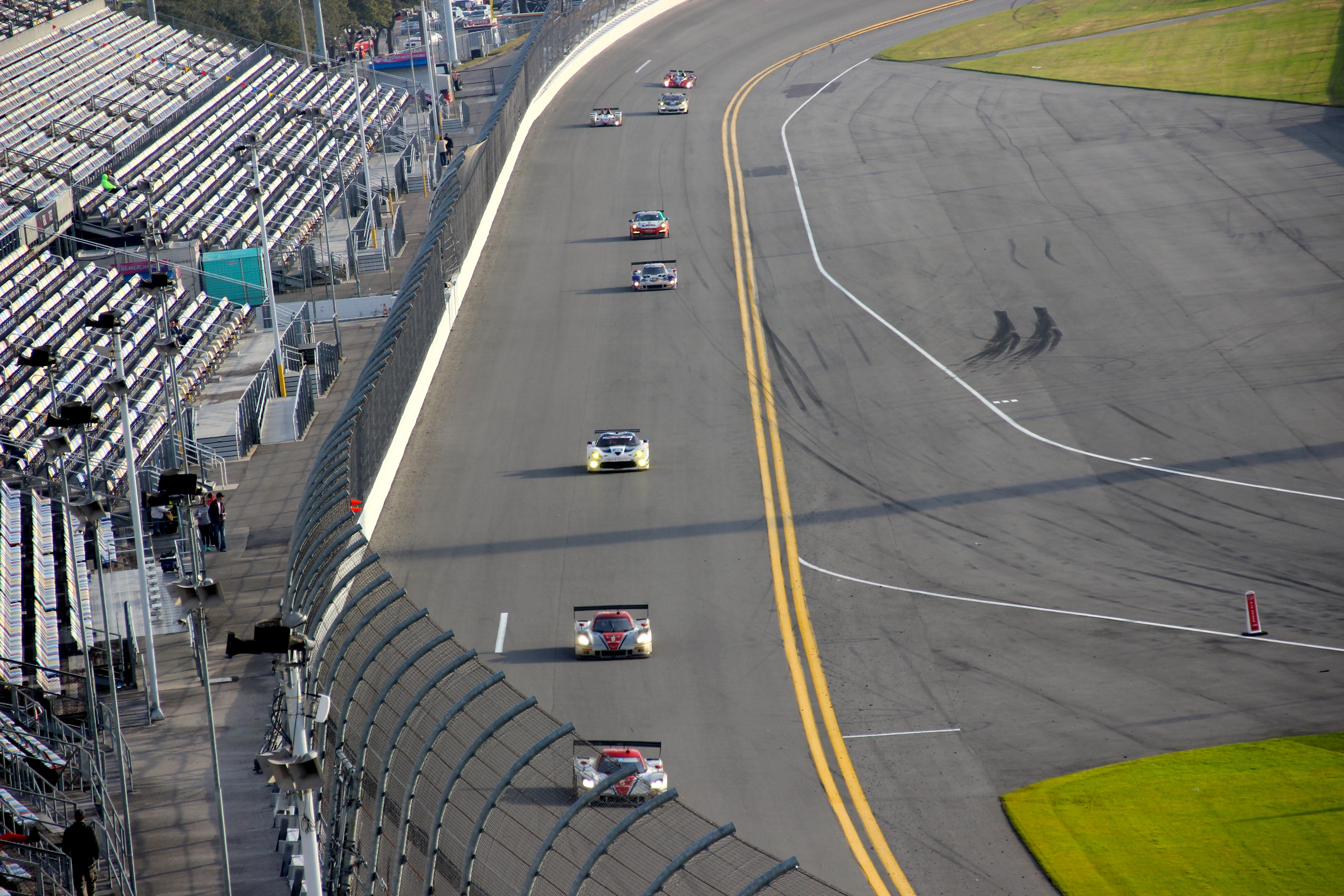
2014 24 Hours of Daytona, first race of reunified IMSA SportsCar Championship

In 2012, Don Panoz sold the Braselton, Georgia-based ALMS to Grand-Am Road Racing, in turn owned directly by NASCAR and helped organize a merger between the ALMS and the Rolex Sports Car Series. In 2013 the unified series was announced as the Tudor United SportsCar Championship (now IMSA SportsCar Championship). The announcement also confirmed that IMSA will manage and sanction the new series, operating as a wholly owned subsidiary of NASCAR.

On September 19, 2019, Scott Atherton announced retirement from his position as the President of the International Motor Sports Association at the end of 2019. He had held that role since the merger of IMSA's American Le Mans Series with the Grand-Am Rolex Sports Car Series in 2014. One month following that announcement, then-director of Mazda's motorsports program in North America, John Doonan, was confirmed to be Atherton's replacement. Ed Bennett, longtime NASCAR executive, was also President and CEO of Grand-Am Road Racing from August 2011 to December 2013 during the merger period and has continued as CEO of the modern era IMSA since January 2014.

At the 2021 Daytona 24 Hours, IMSA and the ACO announced the historic alignment of the technical regulations for sportscar racing, which was further detailed in June of that year, which brought about the convergence of all sportscar regulations between the FIA, IMSA and the ACO. This was highlighted by a universal standard for prototypes, something not seen in decades; the ACO's Le Mans Hypercar class and IMSA's newly-developed LMDh regulations (named Grand Touring Prototypes as an homage to the name IMSA used for its top class in the 1970s and 80s) were functionally identical and could race in both IMSA and WEC with no modifications apart from slightly different balance of performance requirements.

In January 2022, IMSA bought Historic Sportscar Racing, whose events include the Classic 24 Hours of Daytona, the Classic 12 Hours of Sebring and the Monterey Motorsports Reunion.

== Current sanctioned series ==
These are the series that are currently sanctioned and managed by the IMSA organization.

=== IMSA WeatherTech SportsCar Championship ===
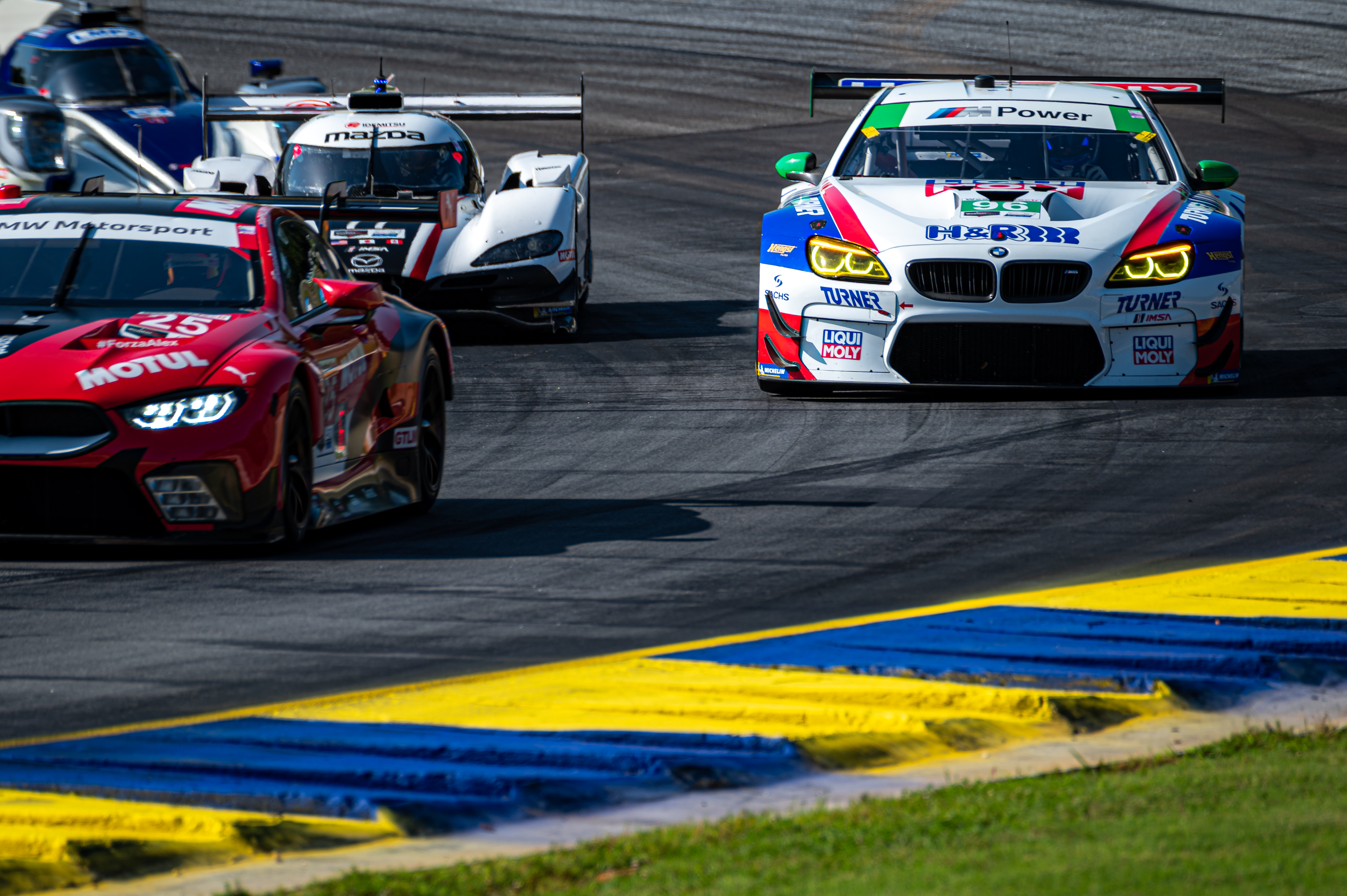
Cars during the 2020 TireRack.com Grand Prix at Road Atlanta

The IMSA SportsCar Championship was created in 2014 through the merger of Grand-Am Road Racing and the American Le Mans Series. It debuted under the name Tudor United SportsCar Championship on January 25–26, 2014 at Daytona International Speedway. For the 2016 season title sponsorship changed from Tudor to WeatherTech. This series currently features LMDh, LMP2, and GT3 cars.

=== IMSA Michelin Pilot Challenge ===
The IMSA Michelin Pilot Challenge is a grand touring and touring car racing series run by the International Motor Sports Association. The Continental Tire Sports Car Challenge was the support series for GRAND-AM's premier offering, the Rolex Sports Car Series. In 2014 it became the support series for the United SportsCar Championship series upon the merger of the Rolex Series and the American Le Mans Series. The series branded as the IMSA Continental Tire SportsCar Challenge, with Continental Tire having been title sponsor since the 2010 season until 2018. In 2019 Michelin replaced Continental Tire as supplier and title sponsor. This series uses TCR Touring Cars and GT4 cars.

=== IMSA VP Racing SportsCar Challenge ===
The IMSA VP Racing SportsCar Challenge is a development series featuring LMP3 and GT4 cars. The series was introduced in 2023 as a replacement for the IMSA Prototype Challenge series. Races in this series are usually run in support of events for the IMSA WeatherTech SportsCar Championship. Most events consist of two 45-minute sprint races with no pit stops or driver changes. The Airbnb Endurance Challenge was added to the series in 2026, where LMP3s and a one-make BMW M2 class compete in a two-hour race with two drivers per team and a required driver change pit stop. Similar to the main IMSA series' Michelin Endurance Cup, the Endurance Challenge pays points both to the main championship standings as well as a second points table strictly for endurance races, with its own trophy and prizes. Unlike its predecessor series, the VP Racing SportsCar Challenge features multi-class racing with prototypes and GTs on track at the same time. As the series is a development series for higher tier series among IMSA's championships, drivers are required to hold either a Silver or Bronze categorization from the FIA for sprint race weekends. Endurance Challenge weekends require one driver per team to be a Silver or Bronze driver; the other driver may be a Gold-level driver.

Beginning in 2027 the VP Racing SportsCar Challenge will move to an all-endurance format, abandoning the sprint races at certain weekends. Races will range from 90 minutes to three hours and feature three classes (LMP3, GT4, and the BMW M2 Racing spec class previously featured only in Endurance Challenge rounds). Each team must field two drivers (one of which must be a Silver or Bronze driver, with Gold drivers only permitted to race with a Bronze teammate) and make at least one timed driver-change pit stop per race, where three crew members may work on the car. The Airbnb sponsorship will shift to a season-long points competition for Bronze-rated drivers, with the LMP3 Bronze Cup winner also earning a seat in the next year's Rolex 24 at Daytona.

=== Porsche Carrera Cup North America ===
The Porsche Carrera Cup North America is a one-make series dedicated to the Porsche 911 GT3 Cup, part of the international Porsche Carrera Cup series, held since 2005. Drivers are allowed to race in three different classes; an open Pro class, the Pro-Am class for drivers age 45 and up, and the Masters class for drivers age 57 and older. The entries were allowed in the American Le Mans Series starting in 2009, in the GTC Class. The series was previously known as the IMSA GT3 Cup Challenge until 2021, where it featured older variants of the 911 GT3 Cup.

=== Ferrari Challenge North America ===
The Ferrari Challenge North America is a one-make series dedicated currently to the Ferrari 296 Challenge, which was previously sanctioned by Grand-Am prior to the merger. It is part of the global Ferrari Challenge program and top drivers in the North America series standings earn the right to race against pilots from other continental or national Ferrari Challenge series at the annual Finali Mondiali in Europe.

=== Lamborghini Super Trofeo ===
The Lamborghini Super Trofeo is a one-make series dedicated to the Lamorghini Huracán LP 620-2 Super Trofeo EVO2. The series debuted in North America under IMSA sanction in 2013. Like the Ferrari Challenge, top drivers from the Super Trofeo North America receive invitations to the Super Trofeo World Final, where they square off against class winners from the European and Asian editions of the series.

=== Mazda MX-5 Cup ===
The Mazda MX-5 Cup presented by BFGoodrich Tires is the signature spec series for the Mazda Road to 24.

The MX-5 Cup race cars start as complete MX-5 road cars from the Mazda Hiroshima, Japan factory before being transported to engineering development partner Flis Performance in Daytona Beach, Florida, where they are transformed into a race car.

The series entered a sanctioning agreement with IMSA beginning with the 2021 season.

=== Ford Mustang Challenge ===
On July 27, 2023, Ford and IMSA announced that the 7th Generation Mustang would have its own spec-racing series called Mustang Challenge, IMSA will sanction the championship with the organization of Ford themselves via the Ford Performance Racing School.

=== McLaren Trophy America ===
In July 2026, IMSA and McLaren Automotive revealed that the McLaren Trophy America, previously sanctioned by USAC and run as a support series for the GT World Challenge America, will switch to IMSA sanctioning beginning in 2027. The McLaren Trophy is a one-make series for the McLaren Artura, with two 50-minute races per weekend and multiple driver classes.

=== IMSA HSR Prototype Challenge ===
On October 24, 2023, it was announced that HSR (owned by IMSA since January 2022) and IMSA were forming a new prototype-only series for LMP3 Gen 1 and Gen 2 cars called the IMSA HSR Prototype Challenge. A minimum 20-car grid was announced as the requirement for standalone races to be held, if not incorporated into races with other prototypes. The six-event calendar will follow HSR's usual events, including the Classic 24 Hour at Daytona and the Classic 12 Hour at Sebring.

== Defunct series ==
These are the series that were formerly run by the IMSA organization.

=== IMSA IS ===
The International Sedan Series was short-lived and the genesis of the Radial Sedan Series. It is unclear if the 1969 inaugural IMSA Sedan race held at the Talladega Superspeedway Road Course was designated International Sedan Series or not. That being the only race held in 1969 details are sketchy, but over the winter of 1969–70 rules were officially promulgated for this Series. It was initially to be known as the International 100 Series as it was intended for sedans up to 100 c.i or 1600 cc., however was revised prior to the start of the 1970 season to include larger engines and presumably the name change to International Sedan Series.

The next year, 1971, the Series was revamped and became the Radial Sedan Series with the revolutionary innovation of requiring DOT radial tires. New rules allowed for cars over 1.6 L divided between two classes. Class A was for Sedans under 2 L., except for overhead cam engines which were limited to 1.6 L. Class B was for larger engines up to whatever IMSA decided appropriate for the Class which was the AMC Gremlin's 232 c.i. for the duration of the 'original' RS Series.

As an aside, the "Baby Grand" moniker frequently applied to these IMSA Series was just that, a nickname. Around this same time a series that was officially designated Baby Grand (better and later known as the Goody's Dash Series) was sanctioned by NASCAR and consisted of 4-cylinder cars purpose-built to run NASCAR ovals. A few RS regulars are known to have run both Series with the same car making minimal changes to accommodate the difference in rules. Carson Baird, driving a Dodge Colt, was one of these 'crossover' competitors.

=== IMSA RS ===
The IMSA RS Series (for radial sedan) began as the Baby Grand Series, in 1971. Originally sponsored by B.F. Goodrich (therefore known as Goodrich Radial Challenge) until they dropped sponsorship midway through 1975 (or 1976) and then by Goodyear (becoming the Goodyear Radial Challenge), and later as Champion Spark Plug Challenge.

The initial race held was in 1969 at Talladega Superspeedway Road Course. Gaston Andrey was first overall in an Alfa Romeo Giulia Super sedan. The Series' first year was actually 1970 with only two races, the inaugural race was at the newly constructed Summit Point Motorsports Park on Memorial Day weekend; Rasey Feezell was first overall in an Alfa Romeo Giulia TI Super sedan; the second race was held at the Montgomery Speedway, Alabama, Red Farmer won in a specially prepared Datsun 510. Feezell didn't fare too well having to drive against the local four-cylinder "beater class" cars brought in to fill out the field, with their protruding wheels rubbing Racey's "immaculate" Alfa Romeo. Infuriated, Feezell quit and never ran another IMSA RS race after that.

The idea was to attract racers who did not have the budgets that were required in the GT category as well as an emphasis on compact sedans such as the AMC Gremlin and the Opel Manta. There were two classes from 1970 through 1973: Class A for under two liters and under 1.6 liters with overhead cam and Class B for over 1.6 L with overhead cam and over two liters up to the largest permitted engine being the 232 cubic inches (3.80 L) AMC Gremlin. In 1974 all cars were placed in one class, with the only parity for the smaller engines being free carburetion for under 1.6 liters. Limited preparation was permitted, and since the entrants were meant to be street-driven race cars, the original rules required the retention of headlights, seats, upholstery, window cranks, stock brakes and original springs and radial tires. Only the exhaust systems and shock absorbers were free. Later rules regarding headlights, seats, upholstery, window cranks, original springs, and other stock elements were loosened up somewhat. From the beginning, engine modifications similar to Sports Car Club of America B Sedan were permitted, with the main difference being that over-boring cylinders was not allowed, and stock carburetors being required, but modifications allowed. The series was loosely based on rival SCCA Trans-Am's Two-Five Challenge rules.

The series became dominated mostly by Mazda's rotary-powered RX-2 and RX-3 prompting IMSA to specify heavier weights than piston-engined cars and prohibited any modifications to the rotors and more importantly to intake and exhaust ports. Datsun also had a fair share of success within the series with cars such as the 510 and 200SX. Many drivers would cut their teeth in this series such as Don Devendorf, of Electramotive fame, Jim Downing, of Kudzu, and Bobby Rahal. The final season was run in 1984 before it was replaced by the IMSA Showroom Stock class the following year, while retaining its sponsor until 1988. As with most now-defunct racing classes, there are revival races run for this category and the SCCA sanctions events for mostly-stock and all-stock cars.

=== American Challenge ===
The American Challenge (in full, Kelly American Challenge), otherwise abbreviated as AAC was a category for US-built cars and throughout the series, it was always run as a support race to the premier GT series. Starting in 1977, the series ran until 1989. In 1992, the premier GTO category was renamed to GTS due to sponsor reasons, and rather than leaving the GTO category redundant, the title was reallocated to the former American Challenge cars. As a result, they would be run alongside GTS cars. This series started the careers of Irv Hoerr, Kenny Irwin Jr., Patty Moise, Clay Young, Lyn St. James and Paul Gentilozzi.

=== IMSA Renault Cup ===
The Renault Cup was a one-make racing series that ran between 1982 and 1985. There was an East Coast (1982–1985) and West Coast series (1983–1985) as well as an overall championship. The series began with the Renault Le Car for two seasons on the East Coast until its discontinuation in the US. The last two seasons, the East Coast Series ran the Renault Encore. The West Coast Series started after the first successful year on the East Coast, but ran the Renault Alliance which had just been introduced.

The genesis of the series was an association of drivers, Associated Road Racers (ARR), founded by Steve Coleman of Raleigh, North Carolina. The association's objective was to start an inexpensive but competitive series with large car counts. The main prerequisite requirement was a series that would allow drivers who had regular jobs and a life to compete with at least a chance to win the championship without having to travel coast to coast, as was the case with other similar series such as the VW Bilstein Cup. The preference was to have a roughly ten-race schedule, with each driver's best six finishes counting toward the Championship.

ARR's members were mostly Showroom Stock racers from the Southeast and Northeast Sports Car Club of America (SCCA) regions. All members put up a bond to ensure they would participate if it came to fruition so that a sanctioning body and a sponsor would be assured success from the start. In the beginning an outline of series rules was drawn up to attract like-minded drivers to join in the effort. Once the association was formed, a final version was to be drafted with all the members' input. The rules along with the association's proposed plan to organize and launch the series, were sent to several manufacturers soliciting sponsorship, including Mazda, Toyota, Nissan, and Renault. All except Renault either rejected the proposal or did not respond.

Renault not only responded, it jumped at the chance, since it was quite familiar with the concept of a one-make series. ARR and Renault negotiated to finalize a format competing with the Le Car R5. Due to classic concerns of track owners and sanctioning bodies, Renault was reluctant to agree to the drivers' points system. Their counterproposal was to run an East Coast series in lieu of nationwide. Since most of the interested drivers were from the East Coast, and the amount of travel required was somewhat limited, this was accepted by the drivers.

Once Renault was on board, John Bishop, President of IMSA, was approached to sanction the series. He was very skeptical at first. A meeting was held on April 4, 1981 at Road Atlanta between Bishop, B Clar, the US Competition Director of Renault, and Coleman representing the drivers. Renault offered a major support program and ARR would guarantee a minimum of twenty-five entrants for the first race. Bishop, still skeptical, agreed to sanction the series. Coleman even suggested there might be as many as fifty, if Renault and IMSA didn't revise the proposed series rules to a point the majority of drivers would pull out before then. Still skeptical he agreed, convinced by Renault's commitment and the driver's assurances of a full field for the inaugural race. Exactly one year to the date on April 4, 1982, the inaugural race was held at Road Atlanta. 51 Le Cars started the race.

One notable driver to come from the series was Parker Johnstone; he took runner-up spot on his debut season in 1984 and would virtually dominate the series following that.

=== IMSA Showroom Stock ===
In 1985, IMSA would undergo a major rules reformat while still retaining its sponsor, therefore it was still known by its sponsor's moniker. This time, the series was more restricted to current models, that is to say models then currently available for retail sale in dealerships throughout the US. Other than that, the series had rules and race formats that were similar to the RS series, being an endurance series.

At the end of the 1987 season, Champion stepped down as sponsor and was replaced by Firestone Tire and Rubber Company; therefore, the series was renamed IMSA Firestone Firehawk Endurance Championship, commonly known as the Firehawk Series, after the Firehawk performance tire brand. Total prize purses, year-end point funds and manufacturer contingency awards in 1991 amounted up to $1 million. As required by the sponsor, all cars were required to use its own Firehawk SZ or Firehawk SV tires which could be shaved to racing depth, or the all-season Firehawk GTX. Bosch and Kendall Oil were also associate sponsors.

Most of the drivers that competed in the series were amateurs or semi-professional, whilst a few made their living out of competing in the series. Dorsey Schroeder and John Andretti are among the few full-time professional drivers who cut their teeth in the series. Meetings usually attracted over ninety entries and were often televised, the duration of the races varying from one two hour and a half event to one 24 hour race. The series would soldier on until 1998, by then known as Speedvision Cup, named for the former motosports-oriented television network.

During the sportscar racing "split" from 1998 until 2013, a rival series from Canada, the Motorola Cup, was sanctioned by the SCCA, with Grand-Am taking over in 2001. This is the other series that led to the modern Continental Tire Sports Car Challenge.

There are three classes, sorted in order from the highest

- Grand Sport Class
  - Chevrolet Camaro, Pontiac Trans Am, Nissan 300ZX (twin-turbo), BMW M3, Ford Thunderbird, Ford Mustang, Porsche 944, Mazda RX-7 (FC3S)
- Sport Class
  - Pontiac Sunbird Turbo, Dodge Daytona Turbo II, Honda Civic CRX Si, Volkswagen Corrado
- Touring Class,
  - Honda Civic Si, Audi 100 Quattro, Pontiac Grand Am

=== IMSA Bridgestone Supercar Championship ===
IMSA also hosted the Bridgestone Supercar Championship, sponsored by the sister brand of Firestone, Bridgestone, which was for higher-end sports cars such as the Porsche 911 Turbo, Lotus Esprit X180R, Chevrolet Corvette, Mazda RX-7 and Nissan 300ZX and was run between 1991 up until 1995. Usually a televised support race to the GT races, running at 30 minutes, the series attracted some well-known professional drivers such as Hans-Joachim Stuck, Hurley Haywood, Doc Bundy, Elliot Forbes-Robinson, Andy Pilgrim and Paul Newman. with a total prize fund of $555,555 for the 1992 season. All cars had to run on road-going Bridgestone Potenza RE71 tires which were trimmed to semi-racing depth and during a wet race, cars raced on full depth.

The series was not without controversy, mainly for the all-composite Consulier GTP, as it was bordering on a departure from the showroom stock ethos, as well as being criticised for having little common with cars that the general public ever saw on a public road. The GTP debuted with just four silver Consulier Series II GTP at Lime Rock in 1991, despite having a 2.2 liter turbo with about 195 hp (145 kW) connected to a five-speed gearbox, weighing at 2,100 lb (950 kg). The car took a pole-to-chequered flag finish, easily outpacing the other more powerful but heavier cars, even if they were piloted by talented and more experienced drivers such as Hurley Haywood in a factory Porsche, Boris Said's Callaway Twin Turbo Corvette, and Jim Minnaker in a factory ZR1 Corvette. It was subsequently announced by IMSA that they felt that it was not in the best interests of the series to allow the Consulier to continue with such a massive weight advantage, so as a result they added a 300 lb (140 kg) weight penalty to the GTP, before its being barred from the series altogether at the end of the season, despite taking a runner up spot.

Despite that, the spirit of that series continues today with the modern GT3-based sportscars.

=== Formula BMW USA ===
The Formula BMW USA series is the North American version of the open-wheel series supported by BMW. All running identical chassis powered by BMW motorcycle engines, the series serves as stepping stone for formula car drivers moving into higher international series. A world championship of all Formula BMW series is run at the end of the year, taking the top drivers from Formula BMW USA and the other similar series elsewhere in the world.

=== Atlantic Championship ===
In June 2008, IMSA began sanction of the Atlantic Championship for two seasons. The series later came under SCCA Pro Racing sanction in 2012.

=== Panoz Racing Series ===
Originally began as Women's Global GT Series, formed by Lyn St. James in 1999, the series began as a support race to ALMS for women racers, using the race modified version of the Panoz Esperante series of cars. The series was an invitational affair with forty one drivers are selected out of four hundred applicants to participate in the Women's Global GT Series. The grid would usually consists of experienced racers such as former Formula One drivers, Giovanna Amati and Divina Galica, NASCAR's Shawna Robinson, and Italian Audi factory team touring car driver Tamara Vidali against talented amateur drivers from varying degrees of professions, such as radio personality, police officer, law student, and racing simulations art designer for Microsoft.

=== Ultra 94 Porsche Cup Challenge Canada by Yokohama ===
In 2011, IMSA created the Ultra 94 Porsche Cup Challenge Canada by Yokohama, which races in support of major Canadian motorsports events including, the Formula One Canadian Grand Prix, the Honda Indy Toronto, the Grand Prix of Mosport and the Grand Prix de Trois-Rivières. The series was replaced by the Porsche Carrera Cup North America in 2021.

=== IMSA Prototype Challenge ===
The Mazda Prototype Lites presented by Cooper Tires Championship was a series featuring two classes of single-seat prototype cars racing simultaneously. Most races were held in support of the United SportsCar Championship; prior to 2014 it was the support series for the American Le Mans Series. The L1 class featured Élan Motorsport Technologies DP02 cars powered by a Mazda MP2 engine, and L2 consists of West Racing WX10 and WR1000 chassis with either a Kawasaki ZX-10R or Suzuki GSX-R1000 engine. Each class had an overall championship, a master's championship for drivers at least 40 years of age, and a team championship. In 2017 the series became the IMSA Prototype Challenge presented by Mazda, featuring LMP3 cars and L1 cars re-branded as MPC (Mazda Prototype Challenge). In 2023, the series was replaced by the IMSA VP Racing SportsCar Challenge, which featured LMP3 and GT4 in their respective classes with shorter race distances.
