= Grand Prix of Charlotte =

Sports car race in North Carolina, USA

MOTUL 100% Synthetic Grand Prix
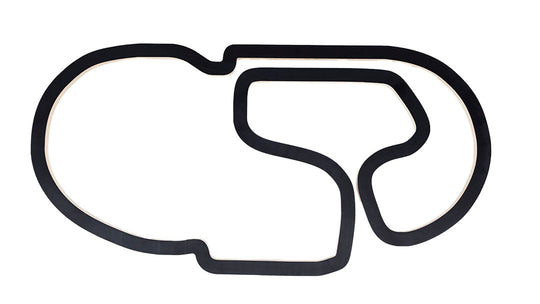

IMSA WeatherTech SportsCar Championship
- Venue: Charlotte Motor Speedway
- Corporate sponsor: Motul
- First race: 1971
- First IMSA race: 2020
- Duration: 1 Hours 40 Minutes
- Previous names: Grand Prix of Charlotte
- Most wins (driver): Al Holbert (2)
- Most wins (team): Holbert Racing (2)
- Most wins (manufacturer): Porsche (4)

The Grand Prix of Charlotte is a sports car race held at the infield road course of the Charlotte Motor Speedway in Concord, North Carolina. The race was held sporadically in the 1970s by the IMSA GT Championship and also the revamped Can-Am series. IMSA held five straight races beginning in 1982. The race was revived in 2000 by the American Le Mans Series for one year.

In 2020, because of the COVID-19 pandemic making it impossible to have events at Lime Rock Park, IMSA announced on August 1, 2020 that the race will be revived as a two-hour (1:40 in racing length) on October 13 as a support race to the NASCAR Bank of America Roval 400 on the road course.

== Results ==
Charlotte Motor Speedway Roval (1971–2014)

Year	Drivers	Team	Car	Duration/Distance	Race title	Report	Ref
IMSA GT Championship
1971	(United States) Dave Heinz (United States) Or Costanzo		Chevrolet Corvette	3 hours	Piedmont 3 Hours	report	
1972 — 1973	Not held						
1974	(United States) Peter Gregg	(United States) Brumos Porsche Audi	Porsche Carrera RSR	300 miles (480 km)	Autopair 300	report	
1975 — 1977	Not held						
Can-Am
1978	(United States) Elliott Forbes-Robinson	(United States) Newman-Freeman Racing	Spyder NF-10-Chevrolet	1 hour		report	
1979	(Belgium) Jacky Ickx	(United States) Carl A. Haas Racing Team, Ltd.	Lola T333CS-Chevrolet	1 hour, 30 minutes		report	
1980 — 1981	Not held						
IMSA GT Championship
1982	(United States) John Paul Sr. (United States) John Paul Jr.	(United States) JLP Racing	Porsche 935 JLP-3	500 kilometres (310 mi)	Camel GT 500	report	
1983	(United States) Al Holbert (United States) Jim Trueman	(United States) Holbert Racing	March 83G-Porsche	500 kilometres (310 mi)	Charlotte Camel GT	report	
1984	(United States) Randy Lanier (United States) Bill Whittington	(United States) Blue Thunder Racing Team	March 84G-Chevrolet	500 kilometres (310 mi)	Charlotte Camel GT 500	report	
1985	(United States) Al Holbert (United Kingdom) Derek Bell	(United States) Holbert Racing	Porsche 962	500 kilometres (310 mi)	Camel GT Grand Prix of Charlotte	report	
1986	(United States) Drake Olson (United States) Price Cobb	(United States) Dyson Racing	Porsche 962	500 kilometres (310 mi)	Camel GT Grand Prix of Charlotte	report	
1987 — 1999	Not held						
American Le Mans Series
2000	(Finland) JJ Lehto (Germany) Jörg Müller	(Germany) BMW Motorsport	BMW V12 LMR	2 Hours, 45 Minutes	Grand Prix of Charlotte	report	
2001 — 2019	Not held						
WeatherTech SportsCar Championship
2020	(Spain) Antonio García (United States) Jordan Taylor	(United States) Corvette Racing	Chevrolet Corvette C8.R	1 Hour, 40 Minutes	MOTUL 100% Synthetic Grand Prix	Report	
