= Heimrath =

Heimrath is a German surname. Notable people with the surname include:

- Ludwig Heimrath (born 1956), Canadian former race car driver
- Ludwig Heimrath Sr. (1934–2021), German-born Canadian racing driver
