= Prototypes: The History of the IMSA GTP Series =

- Author: J.A. Martin and Ken Wells
- Original title: Prototypes: Men and Machines on the Edge
- Language: English
- Subject: Motorsport
- Publisher: David Bull Publishing
- Publication date: December 2000
- Publication place: United States
- Media type: Hardcover
- Pages: 512
- ISBN: 1-893618-01-3
- OCLC: 44436442
- Dewey Decimal: 629.228 21
- LC Class: TL236 .M3518 2000

Prototypes: The History of the IMSA GTP Series (original working title: Prototypes: Men and Machines on the Edge) is a non-fiction book, published in 2000 and written by motorsport journalists J.A. Martin and Ken Wells. The book documents the history of the flagship IMSA GTP category for the United States equivalent of the European Group C sports prototype racing cars.

Ken Wells, who unexpectedly died in 1992, was posthumously credited as the author as he was credited for preparation works on the books, following his death, J.A. "Jim" Martin was credited for completion work of the project in which he additionally interviewed over 130 drivers, designers, mechanics, managers and officials involved in the series. Derek Bell and Hans-Joachim Stuck makes an introduction on the foreword on the books, telling their experiences in the series.

The book is split into two sections, the first section is devoted to racing teams and constructors who contributed heavily to the series and the final 186 pages are devoted to race results. Between the two sections, an epilogue explained frankly the cause of the category's sudden demise in 1993. Unlike all other book documenting a racing series, it does not give a race-by race account or car profiles.

The book was followed by Inside IMSA's Legendary GTP Race Cars: The Prototype Experience, which emphasise the cars involved in details, also written by Martin.

== Awards and nominations ==
- Winner, 2001 Independent Publisher Book Award, Sports/Recreation category winner
- Winner, American Auto Racing Writers and Broadcasters Association, Book of the Year 2001
