= IMSA GT Championship =

Auto racing championship in the United States

- Category: Sportscar racing
- Country: North America
- Inaugural season: 1971
- Folded: 1998

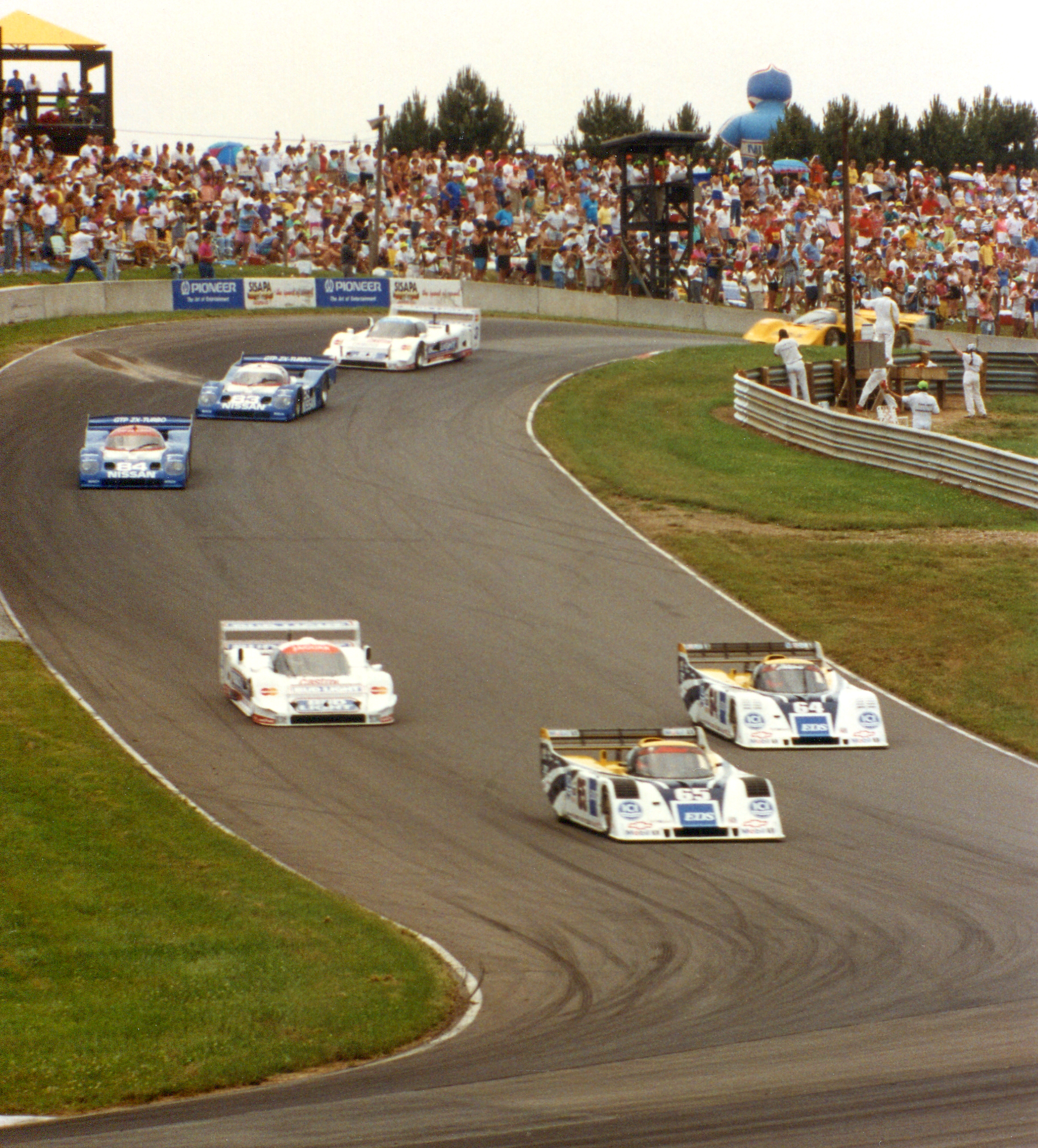
(front to rear) Tommy Kendall and Wayne Taylor (both driving an Intrepid RM-1) leads eventual winner Davy Jones (Jaguar XJR-16) and Chip Robinson, followed by Geoff Brabham (both in Nissan NPT-90), Raul Boesel (XJR-16) and James Weaver (Porsche 962) in the Nissan Grand Prix of Ohio, at Mid-Ohio Sports Car Course, 1991

IMSA GT was a sports car racing series organized by IMSA. Races took place primarily in the United States and occasionally in Canada.

== History ==
The series was founded in 1969 by John and Peggy Bishop, and Bill France Sr. Racing began in 1971, and was originally aimed at two of FIA's stock car categories, running two classes each; the GT (Groups 3 and 4) and touring (Group 1 and 2) classes. The first race was held at Virginia International Raceway; it was an unexpected success, with both the drivers and the handful of spectators who attended.

For the following year, John Bishop brought in sponsor R. J. Reynolds, and in 1975 introduced a new category: All American Grand Touring (AAGT). In 1977, the series went through a series of major changes. IMSA permitted turbocharged cars to compete for the first time, as well as introducing a new category: GTX, based on Group 5 rules. In 1981, after Bishop decided to not follow FIA's newly introduced Group C rules, he introduced the GTP class for sports prototypes. In 1989, Bishop sold off his organization. After a period of decline in the early 1990s, the Sports Racer Prototype category was introduced in 1993 to replace the top IMSA GTP category in 1994. In deference to the series deviating from the FIA's naming of the class to Sports Racers and Le Mans Prototypes by the French Automobile Club de l'Ouest (ACO) in Europe for their then separate series, the new class was designated IMSA World Sports Car.

After a period of multiple ownerships, the organization, by then owned by Don Panoz, was eventually renamed Professional Sports Car Racing (PSCR). In 1999, PSCR decided to affiliate with the Automobile Club de l'Ouest and adopt the sanctioning body's rule book, renaming the series the American Le Mans Series. Despite having various official names, the GT series was known commonly as the "IMSA series", as it was the sanctioning body. For legal reasons, both the 1999-2013 ALMS and the current IMSA SportsCar Championship are regarded as a continuation of the original IMSA GT Championship.

== Initial divisions ==
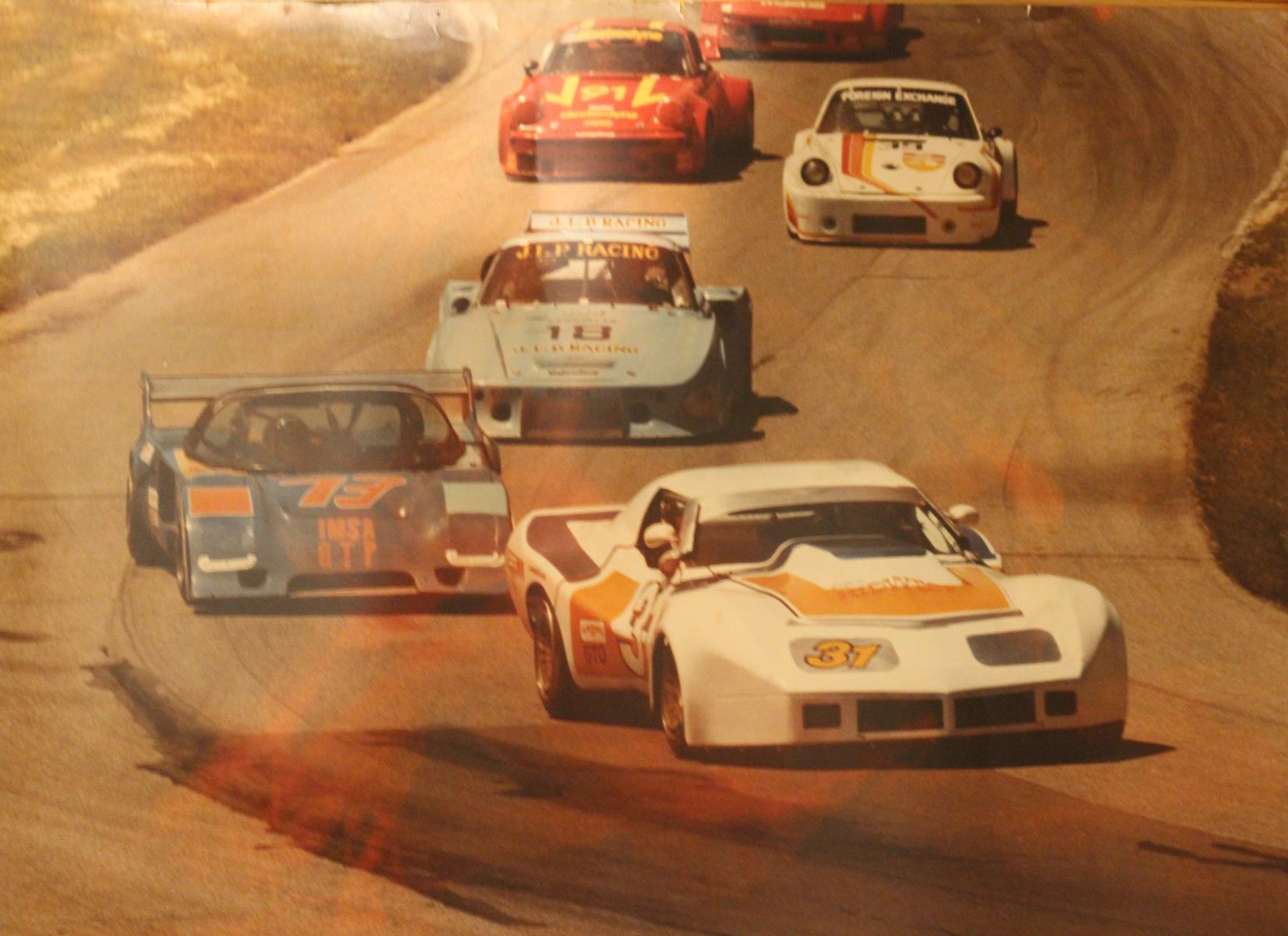
1981 IMSA race at Road Atlanta featuring GTO, GTU, and GTP cars

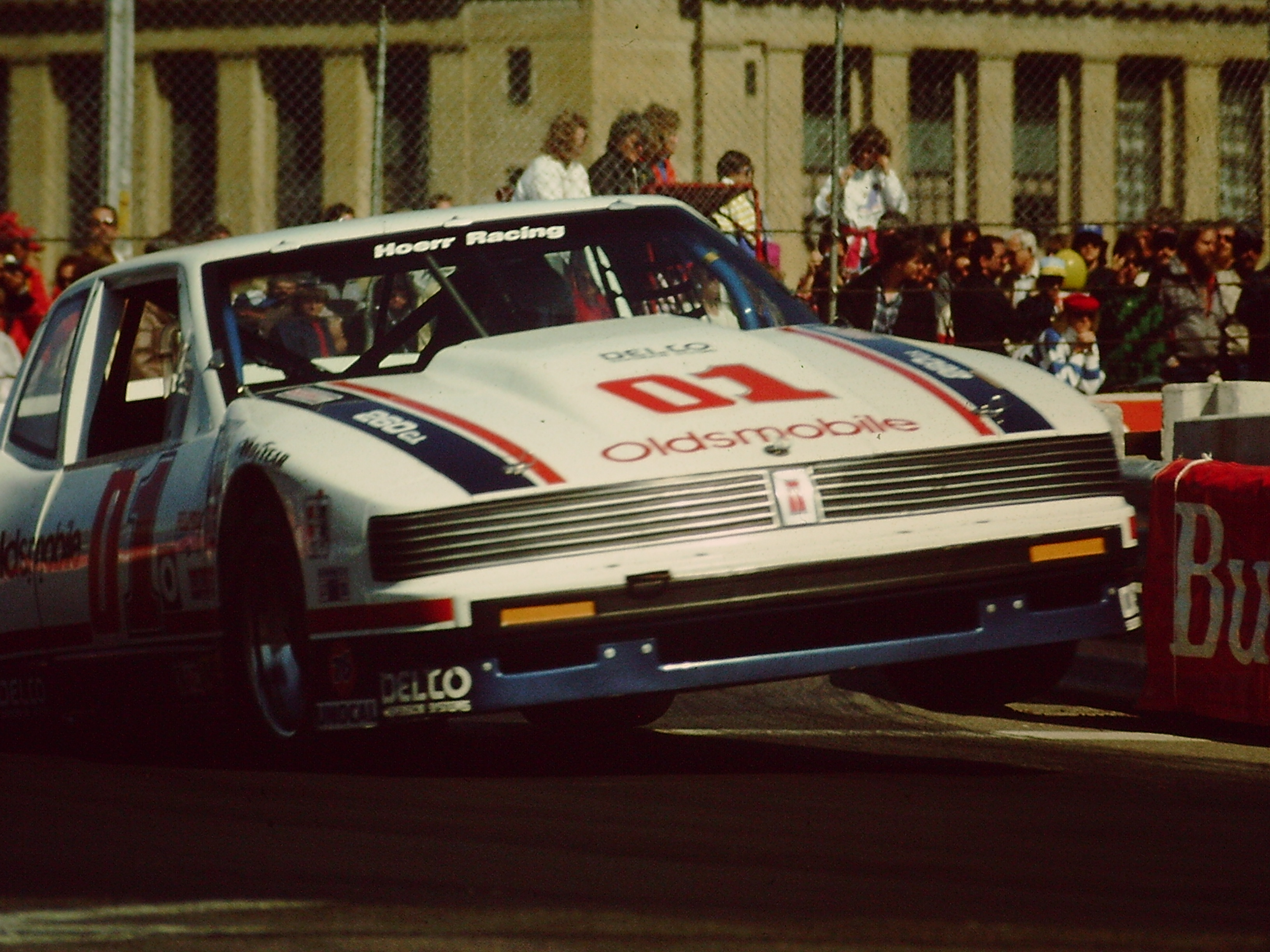
Robin McCall in the Hoerr Racing GTO Oldsmobile (1987)

The 1971 season was the first racing season, and lasted six races. The early years of the series featured GT cars, similar to the European Group 2 and Group 4 classes, divided into four groups:

- GTO - Grand touring-type cars with engines of 2.5L displacement or more, the letter O meaning "over 2.5L". The GTO class was dominated by Corvettes, then by Shelby Mustangs, and then various factory teams consisting of Cougars, 280ZXs, Celicas and finally, 300ZXs.
- GTU - Grand touring-type cars with engines of 2.5L displacement or less, the letter U meaning "under 2.5L". The GTU group was dominated by Porsche 914-6 GTs, and SA22 Mazda RX-7s (1978–1985) through the end of the 1980s.
- TO - Touring-type cars, such as the Chevrolet Camaro with engines of 2.5L or more displacement
- TU - Touring-type cars with engines of 2.5L or less displacement

In essence, these groups had been absorbed from the Trans-Am Series. Trans Am would quickly become a support series for IMSA GT.

== History of the top series in the GT Championship ==
=== Camel GT era ===
The first champions were Peter Gregg and Hurley Haywood, in a Porsche 914-6 GTU. Common winners in these early years of IMSA were the Porsche 911 Carrera RSR, and the Chevrolet Corvette. Camel became the title sponsor during the second season, with the series becoming known as the Camel GT Challenge Series. The sponsor's corporate decal had to be displayed and clearly visible on the left and right sides of all racecars, and Camel's corporate logo patch was also required to be on the Nomex driver suit's breast area, featuring Joe Camel smiling and smoking a cigarette while driving a race car.

Initially, all cars were identified with a category tag, stating which category they competed in, but from the middle of the 1975 season on, all cars within the series had to have a rectangular IMSA GT decal, which incorporated its logo on the left, followed by a large GT tag, as well as a Joe Camel decal.

Starting fields of 30 or more competitors were not unusual during this era. One of the premiere race events was the Paul Revere 250, which started at midnight of the Fourth of July. The race was conducted entirely at night.

In 1975 a new category, All American Grand Touring (AAGT), was introduced to counteract the Porsche dominance in GTO.

In 1981, the Bob Sharp Racing team used a loophole in the rules to build a Datsun 280ZX inside the U.S. with a V8 engine from a Nissan President. The car was not a success, however, and it became obsolete when the new GTP category was created. TU would be phased out in 1976, TO the following year.

Turbochargers were not permitted until the middle of the 1977 season. They were allowed following protests by Porsche's motorsport department, after inspecting Al Holbert's AAGT winning Chevrolet Monza, which had won two titles. Prior to 1977, Porsche privateers struggled with obsolete 911 Carrera RSRs against the AAGT cars.

Engine sizes were determined by IMSA officials, who had devised a set of rules to determine fair competition, using a displacement versus minimum weight formula. Turbochargers were taken into account as well as rotary power, fuel injection, and many other engine features.

As a result, the new premier class known as GTX (Grand Touring Experimental, which was based on FIA's Group 5), brought on the absolute dominance of the Porsche 935. The 935 became the most successful car in the series. The most successful driver of the 1970s was Peter Gregg, who won championships in 1971, 1973, 1974, 1975, 1978, and 1979. Twin turbos were outlawed at the end of the 1982 season after John Paul Sr. and John Paul Jr. dominated in a modified 935.

=== GT spaceframe era ===
In 1984, all GT cars were required to display a large square decal to identify which category the car competed in. A GTU car, for instance, would have a black U on white, and a GTO car, a white O on black. All others had standard IMSA GT decals.

One significant change to the rules during the 1980s was the 2.5 liter limit being increased to 3.0 liters, with the maximum 6.0 liter limit still in place. 3.0L cars were required to weigh 1,900 lb (860 kg), whereas 6.0L cars had to weigh no less than 2,700 lb (1,200 kg). In an effort to equalize the competition, two-valve turbocharged cars were required to weigh 15% more, and four-valve turbocharged cars 20% more. Electronic fuel injection became common, while ground effects were still prohibited.

Steering, braking, transmission, and suspension were left up to the constructor. Bigger, more powerful engines were permitted under homologation rules. The number of valves, ports, and spark plugs were not allowed to be modified from the original configuration.

The AAR Toyota team suddenly encountered a daunting problem with the rules when, with Toyota's introduction of the new, fourth generation, Celica for the US market, and the team's first entry into the top-flight GTO category (despite not having won a single GTU title), the team faced the distinct possibility that they would be required to race a front-wheel-drive car, until they managed to persuade IMSA to change the rules, thereby permitting cars to race with something other than their original drivetrain, and therefore with a redesigned chassis. To AAR's delight, IMSA did change the rules, and the car was converted to rear wheel drive. One outstanding feature of the car was the 4T-GTE engine, from its Safari Rally-winning, Group B predecessor, producing around 475 hp (354 kW). Piloted by the likes of Chris Cord, Willy T. Ribbs, and Dennis Aase, the car was dominant in its class right up until the team's move to GTP. Utilizing the same engine, it became dominant once again. Other teams would follow this example, with notable cars such as the Chevrolet Beretta (in the Trans-Am series) and the Mazda MX-6 (in IMSA GTU).

The Celica was one of just a few cars that had broken away from its production GT derivatives of the earlier years. With a full spaceframe chassis, they became serious race cars. By 1987, the category became dominated by factory teams, with testing sessions becoming common, and rules tailored to welcome them in rather than turn them away. Otherwise, the cars were required to closely resemble their showroom counterparts, though fenders could be widened, increasing the track up to 79 inches (2,000 mm).

There were no restrictions on body materials, as most teams favored removable, easy to repair fiberglass (meaning one of the only remaining panels from a car's production counterpart was the steel roof structure).

Another car that exploited the rules was the Audi 80. With its advanced Quattro four-wheel-drive system, the car had the potential to dominate during the 1989 season. The car performed well, but faced heavy competitions from two factory teams; the Roush Racing Mercury Cougar XR7, and Clayton Cunningham Racing's Nissan 300ZX, which took seven wins out of fifteen. Audi stayed away from the early season endurance classics (Daytona and Sebring), and had two cars drop out of the race in two different rounds, thereby costing them both the manufacturer's and driver's titles, Hans-Joachim Stuck driving.

Another manufacturer to experience a run of wins was Mazda. After some success by the Mazda RX-2 and Mazda RX-3, the Mazda RX-7 won its class in the IMSA 24 Hours of Daytona race an amazing ten years in a row, starting in 1982. It also won eight IMSA GTU championships in a row from 1980 through 1987. The car went on to win more IMSA races in its class than any other model of automobile, with its one hundredth victory on September 2, 1990.

=== GTP era ===
Class decal of GTP category

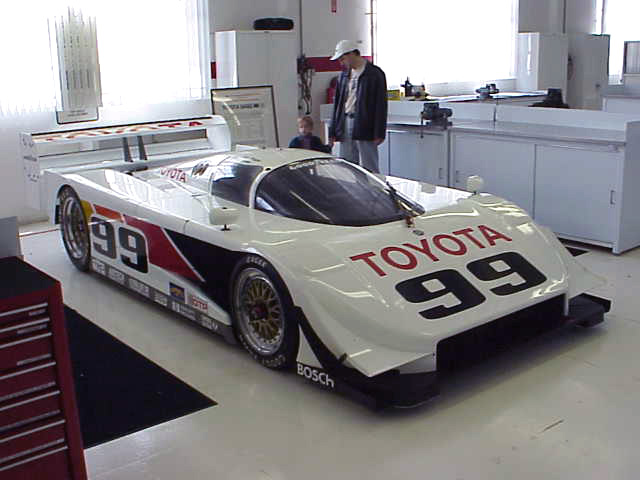
Toyota Eagle Mk.III GTP class car

In 1981, purpose-built GTP cars (Grand Touring Prototypes) appeared in the championship, and were similar to the new FIA Group C cars which would be introduced to the World Endurance Championship from 1982. The main difference between the two categories was that the former had no emphasis on fuel consumption which was highlighted by Derek Bell saying "Race fans do not come to races to watch an economy run." Brian Redman was the first GTP champion, driving a Lola T600 with a Chevrolet engine. March also fielded prototypes, with Al Holbert winning the 1983 championship with a Chevrolet powered car, changing to Porsche power later in the season; and Randy Lanier a year later with Chevrolet power. 1984 also saw the introduction of the Porsche 962, which dominated the series from '85 to '87. Nissan then took control of the series in 1988, but faced challenges from Jaguar, Porsche, and Toyota throughout the next three years. Toyota was quickest in 1992 and 1993, at the end of the GTP era, as Dan Gurney's All American Racers team campaigned the Eagle MkIII, a car so dominant that it has been blamed for the demise of the class. Along with the GTP cars, the Camel Lights cars, a smaller capacity, non-turbocharged, lower powered prototype category was introduced in 1985. Argo Racing Cars was the first 'Lights' Champions, followed by Spice Engineering. Other well known participants were the Tiga, Royale, Alba, Fabcar, and Kudzu.

Starting with the 1986 season, the GTP category had their own decal, which was similar to the IMSA GT side decal, with a P being added to denote their category. Camel Lights cars also used the same decal

There were many other manufacturers in the GTP class, such as URD Rennsport, Spice, Intrepid or Gebhardt, and in the early 1990s, Mazda.

=== Fall of GTP ===
Following a successful heart surgery in 1987, Bishop began to rethink his priorities. He was approached by Mike Cone and Jeff Parker, owners of Tampa Race Circuit. In January 1989, Bishop and France sold the series to Cone and Parker. The new owners relocated the IMSA headquarters from Connecticut to Tampa Bay. Bishop would stand down as president in favor of Mark Raffauf, who was his deputy, and its representative on the ACCUS board. Cone and Parker sold it to businessman Charles Slater. Both lost millions attempting to revive the sagging TV ratings.

By 1992, there were a number of factors that led to the decline of the GTP category. Porsche concentrated on its IndyCar (Porsche 2708) program when critics stated that the Zuffenhausen marque should have built a followup to its 962. Back in 1988, Al Holbert realized that the 962 was beginning to feel dated. He proposed a follow-up open-top Porsche powered racer which would also be sold to customer teams. That project never got off the ground due to Holbert's death in an aircraft accident later in the year. For some, much of the blame was on the organization for allowing the Japanese "works" teams to dominate the series. Under Bishop's original vision, privateers and "works teams" were able to race equally. Privateer teams walked away, while the Japanese economy started to go downhill. These factors led Nissan and Mazda to leave the series. Critics predicted that the decreased variety of cars would disappoint race fans, and in fact, it did finally kill the series in 1993. GTP cars ran their last race on October 2, 1993, at Phoenix.

The GTP category was credited for many innovations in the U.S., including antilock brakes, traction control, and active suspension. Dave Cowart and Kemper Miller's Red Lobster sponsored team of the early 1980s would innovate race team hospitality, practices which were subsequently adopted by virtually every other team. For those that competed, GTP was recognized for its camaraderie among drivers, especially rivals. But Hans Stuck, commenting in the foreword of the book "Prototypes: The History of the IMSA GTP Series", sarcastically compared the series' camaraderie to Formula One's lack of such.

=== World Sports Cars ===
With rising costs and factory teams walking away from the series, which meant diminishing entries and diminishing profit, IMSA introduced a new prototype category for in 1993: World Sport Car (WSC). WSC replaced GTP and Camel Lights' closed-top cars for the following year. The WSC cars were open-top, flat-bottomed sports-prototypes with production engines, as opposed to racing versions of production engines from GTP cars.

The WSC cars made their debut at the Miami Grand Prix with the sole entry of Brent O'Neill. The car finished last among the cars that were still running. After skipping the 12 Hours of Sebring, the category would compete for the remainder of the season in non-Championship rounds, with no more than four cars entering each race. In 1994 Camel was replaced by Exxon as the title sponsor. However, as the WSC cars took over as the leading category, their reliability would be tested at the opening round at the 24 Hours of Daytona. Two cars started on the front row, with eight WSC cars competing. Two cars finished the race, with the leading WSC car finishing ninth behind GT cars. A WSC car would score its first podium finish at Sebring with a second, and third place behind a Daytona winning GTS class Nissan 300ZX. That led to a rule change for the latter category, as they would be barred from using engines that were originally for GTP cars. At the inaugural round for WSC cars at Road Atlanta, the new Ferrari 333 SP would make its debut amongst mass media fanfare, and win its debut race. The car brand regularly achieving podium finishes every round after that, Oldsmobile, won the manufacturer's title over Ferrari by four points.

In 1995, a new rival for Ferrari appeared in the Riley & Scott Mk III. The car would make its debut at Daytona, but would retire after the eleventh lap due to engine failure. Ferrari would help the category score an overall win at the 12 Hours of Sebring, and would take the manufacturer's title. The Ferrari 333 SP and the R&S cars (Oldsmobile / Ford) were the dominant entries in the series from 1995 until the demise of IMSA at the end of 1998.

In 1996, Slater sold the organization to Roberto Müller (ex-CEO of Reebok) and Wall Street financier Andy Evans, who was also an IndyCar owner, and owner-driver of the Scandia WSC team. Evans and VP of marketing Kurtis Eide were responsible for the name change to Professional Sports Car Racing.

In 1992, the long running category American Challenge stepped into the GT series. It became known as the GTO category when the former GTO category was renamed GTS (Grand Touring Supreme). The move was prompted by sponsor Exxon, who wanted the series named after its sub-brand of fuel. In 1995, in a bid to move closer to the European BPR Global GT Series, the GT category would undergo another major reformatting. GTS became known as GTS-1, and GTU became known as GTS-2. In 1997, there was another category addition: GTS-2 became GTS-3. The new GTS-2 category was introduced to allow for the existing GT2 cars.

=== End of an era ===
Under tremendous pressure from team owners and management, Evans sold the series to PST Holdings, Inc., a group led by Raymond Smith, formerly the chief financial officer of Sports Car. Other owners included Dough Robinson and Tom Milner. In 2001 Don Panoz purchased PSCR to solidify the sanction for Panoz's American Le Mans Series (ALMS) which had been sanctioned by PSCR since 1999. Panoz renamed the sanctioning organization IMSA, and it was the official sanctioning body of the American Le Mans Series, the Star Mazda series, and the Panoz GT Pro series. The ALMS uses regulations based on those of the 24 Hours of Le Mans, but in 2005 the relationship between Panoz and the Le Mans organizers, ACO, became problematic.

A breakaway series formed in 1998 involving the Sports Car Club of America, and was running under the name of the United States Road Racing Championship. It was headed by a group of competitors that wanted to keep the rules within the United States. After failing by 1999, a new U.S.-based series was started with the full support of NASCAR's France family named the Grand-Am Road Racing, operating the headlining Rolex Sports Car Series. The series struggled early on, but after the introduction of the Daytona Prototype class, proved to be a popular competitor to the more international ALMS, attracting some pro drivers and teams, featuring large fields, and producing close competition. Much like the split from 1996 to 2008 between Champ Car and the IRL, critics say this split was detrimental to the sport as a whole. Grand AM and ALMS merged in 2014 under IMSA sanction and France family ownership to create the IMSA SportsCar Championship. The WeatherTech Championship is considered the official continuation.

After the series' demise, a U.S.-based historical racing organization, Historic Sportscar Racing, created a new series to put GTP and Group C cars that had been stored away back onto the track. The series was called HSR ThunderSport. Its creation sparked a similar revival series in Europe, as well as another series in the UK called Group C/GTP Racing.

== Champions ==
Year	GTO			GTU		
1971	(United States) Dave Heinz			(United States) Peter Gregg (United States) Hurley Haywood		
1972	(United States) Phil Currin			(United States) Hurley Haywood		
1973	(United States) Peter Gregg			(United States) Bob Bergstrom		
1974	(United States) Peter Gregg			(United States) Walt Maas		
1975	(United States) Peter Gregg			(United States) Bob Sharp		
1976	(United States) Al Holbert			(United States) Brad Frisselle		
1977	(United States) Al Holbert			(United States) Walt Maas		
1978	GTX			GTO		GTU
1978	(United States) Peter Gregg			(United States) Dave Cowart		(United States) Dave White
1979	(United States) Peter Gregg			(United States) Howard Meister		(United States) Don Devendorf
1980	(United Kingdom) John Fitzpatrick			(Dominican Republic) Luis Mendez		(United States) Walt Bohren
1981	(United Kingdom) Brian Redman			(United States) Dave Cowart		(United States) Len Mueller
1982	GTP			GTO		GTU
1982	(United States) John Paul Jr.	Porsche 935/Lola T600		(United States) Don Devendorf		(United States) Jim Downing
1983	(United States) Al Holbert	March 83G		(United States) Wayne Baker		(United States) Roger Mandeville
1984	(United States) Randy Lanier	March 83G		(United States) Roger Mandeville		(United States) Jack Baldwin
1985	GTP		Lights	GTO		GTU
1985	(United States) Al Holbert	Porsche 962	(United States) Jim Downing	(Canada) John Jones		(United States) Jack Baldwin
1986	(United States) Al Holbert	Porsche 962	(United States) Jim Downing	(United States) Scott Pruett		(United States) Tommy Kendall
1987	(United States) Chip Robinson	Porsche 962	(United States) Jim Downing	(United States) Chris Cord		(United States) Tommy Kendall
1988	(Australia) Geoff Brabham	Nissan GTP ZX-Turbo	(United States) Tom Hessert	(United States) Scott Pruett		(United States) Tommy Kendall
1989	(Australia) Geoff Brabham	Nissan GTP ZX-Turbo	(United States) Scott Schubot	(United States) Pete Halsmer		(United States) Bob Leitzinger
1990	(Australia) Geoff Brabham	Nissan GTP ZX-Turbo	(Mexico) Tomás López Rocha	(United States) Dorsey Schroeder		(United States) Lance Stewart
1991	(Australia) Geoff Brabham	Nissan NPT-91	(United States) Parker Johnstone	(United States) Pete Halsmer		(United States) John Fergus
1992	GTP		Lights	GTS	GTO	GTU
1992	(Argentina) Juan Manuel Fangio II	Toyota Eagle MKIII	(United States) Parker Johnstone	(New Zealand) Steve Millen	(United States) Irv Hoerr	(United States) David Loring
1993	(Argentina) Juan Manuel Fangio II	Toyota Eagle MKIII	(United States) Parker Johnstone	(United States) Tommy Kendall	(United States) Charles Morgan	(United States) Butch Leitzinger
1994	WSC			GTS	GTO	GTU
1994	(South Africa) Wayne Taylor	Kudzu-Mazda		(New Zealand) Steve Millen	(United States) Joe Pezza	(United States) Jim Pace
1995	WSC			GTS-1	GTS-2	
1995	(Spain) Fermín Vélez	Ferrari 333 SP		(United States) Irv Hoerr	(Costa Rica) Jorge Trejos	
1996	(South Africa) Wayne Taylor	Riley & Scott-Oldsmobile		(United States) Irv Hoerr	(United States) Larry Schumacher	
1997	WSC			GTS-1	GTS-2	GTS-3
1997	(United States) Butch Leitzinger	Riley & Scott-Ford		(United States) Andy Pilgrim	(United States) Larry Schumacher	(United States) Bill Auberlen
1998	WSC			GT1	GT2	GT3
1998	(United States) Butch Leitzinger	Riley & Scott-Ford		(United Kingdom) Andy Wallace (Australia) David Brabham	(United States) Larry Schumacher	(United States) Mark Simo

== See also ==
- IMSA GT classes
- Prototypes: The History of the IMSA GTP Series

== Bibliography ==
- Bishop, Mitch (29 January 2019). IMSA 1969-1989: The Inside Story of How John Bishop Built the World's Greatest Sports Car Racing Series. Octane Press. ISBN 9781937747893.
- Raffauf, Mark (1 February 2025). IMSA 1990-1999: The Turbulent Years of American Sports Car Racing. Octane Press. ISBN 9781642340501.
