= 1973 IMSA GT Championship =

3rd season of the racing series organized by IMSA

Seasons
- ← 1972 1974 →

The 1973 Camel GT season was the 3rd season of the IMSA GT Championship auto racing series. It was for Grand Tourer-style racing cars which ran in the GTO and GTU classes, as well as former Trans Am Series cars in the TO and TU classes. It began March 24, 1973, and ended November 25, 1973, after ten rounds. This year marked the decline of Trans Am and the beginning of it and IMSA GT becoming nigh indistinguishable.

== Schedule ==
Some events were run twice, with each running counting as one round.

Rnd	Race	Length	Circuit	Date
1	12 Hours of Sebring	12 Hours	Sebring International Raceway	March 24
2	Daytona 3 Hours	3 Hours	Daytona International Raceway	April 21
3	Pocono 500	500 mi (800 km)	Pocono International Raceway	June 10
4	Paul Revere 250	250 mi (400 km)	Daytona International Speedway	July 4
5	Mid-Ohio 6 Hour	6 Hours	Mid-Ohio Sports Car Course	July 15
6	Lime Rock 100	100 mi (160 km)	Lime Rock Park	September 15
7	Lime Rock 100	100 mi (160 km)	Lime Rock Park	September 15
8	Atlanta 200	200 mi (320 km)	Road Atlanta	September 30
9	3 Hours of Indianapolis	3 Hours	Indianapolis Raceway Park	October 14
10	Camel GT 250 at Daytona	250 mi (400 km)	Daytona International Speedway	November 25

== Season results ==
Overall winner in bold.

Rnd	Circuit	GTO Winning Team	GTU Winning Team	TO Winning Team	TU Winning Team	Results
Rnd	Circuit	GTO Winning Drivers	GTU Winning Drivers	TO Winning Drivers	TU Winning Drivers	Results
1	Sebring	**#59 Dave Helmick**	#27 Don Lindley	#17 Vince Gimondo	#112 Jim Grob Racing	results
1	Sebring	**(United States) Peter Gregg** **(United States) Hurley Haywood** **(United States) Dave Helmick**	(United States) Don Lindley (United States) Stephen Behr (United States) Brian Goellnicht	(United States) Vince Gimondo (United States) Billy Dingman	(United States) Jim Grob (Chile) Juan Montalvo	results
2	Daytona	**#59 Brumos Porsche-Audi Corp.**	#32 Bob Bergstrom	#88 Carter Racing Services	#112 Jim Grob Racing	results
2	Daytona	**(United States) Peter Gregg** **(United States) Hurley Haywood**	(United States) Bob Bergstrom (United States) Jim Cook	(Canada) Maurice Carter	(United States) Jim Grob (Chile) Juan Montalvo	results
3	Pocono	#1 Toad Hall Motor Racing	#62 Bob Bergstrom	**#88 Carter Racing Services**	#90 Z & W Mazda	results
3	Pocono	(United States) Mike Keyser (United States) Stephen Behr	(United States) Bob Bergstrom (United States) Jim Cook	**(Canada) Maurice Carter** **(United States) Tony DeLorenzo**	(United States) Ray Walle (United States) Bob Speakman (United States) Richard Schuck	results
4	Daytona	**#96 Gene Felton**	#62 Bob Bergstrom	#88 Carter Racing Services	#32 BMW	results
4	Daytona	**(United States) Gene Felton**	(United States) Bob Bergstrom	(Canada) Maurice Carter	(United States) Phil Dermer	results
5	Mid-Ohio	**#1 Toad Hall Motor Racing**	#62 Bob Bergstrom	#3 Ausca, Inc.	#60 Auto Sport by Jiri	results
5	Mid-Ohio	**(United States) Mike Keyser** **(United States) Bob Beasley**	(United States) Bob Bergstrom (United States) Jim Cook	(United States) Harry Theodoracopulos (United States) Horst Kwech	(United States) Dave Nicholas (United States) John Magee	results
6	Lime Rock	**#1 Toad Hall Motor Racing**	#62 Bob Bergstrom	#18 Warren Agor	#60 Auto Sport by Jiri	results
6	Lime Rock	**(United States) Mike Keyser**	(United States) Bob Bergstrom	(United States) Warren Agor	(United States) Dave Nicholas	results
7	Lime Rock	**#59 Peter Gregg**	#74 Ludwig Heimrath	#18 Warren Agor	#60 John Magee	results
7	Lime Rock	**(United States) Peter Gregg**	(Canada) Ludwig Heimrath Sr.	(United States) Warren Agor	(United States) John Magee	results
8	Road Atlanta	**#59 Peter Gregg**	#74 Ludwig Heimrath Sr.	#3 Ausca	no finishers	results
8	Road Atlanta	**(United States) Peter Gregg**	(Canada) Ludwig Heimrath Sr.	(United States) Horst Kwech	no finishers	results
9	IRP	**#59 Peter Gregg**	#74 Ludwig Heimrath Sr.	#3 Ausca	#90 Z & W Mazda	results
9	IRP	**(United States) Peter Gregg**	(Canada) Ludwig Heimrath Sr.	(United States) Harry Theodoracopulos (United States) Horst Kwech	(United States) Ray Walle (United States) Ray Kraftson	results
10	Daytona	**#59 Peter Gregg**	#74 Ludwig Heimrath Sr.	#18 Warren Agor Racing	#35 BMW	results
10	Daytona	**(United States) Peter Gregg** **(United States) Hurley Haywood**	(Canada) Ludwig Heimrath Sr.	(United States) Warren Agor	(United States) Phil Dermer	results
