= Ludwig Heimrath Sr. =

Canadian racing driver (1934–2021)

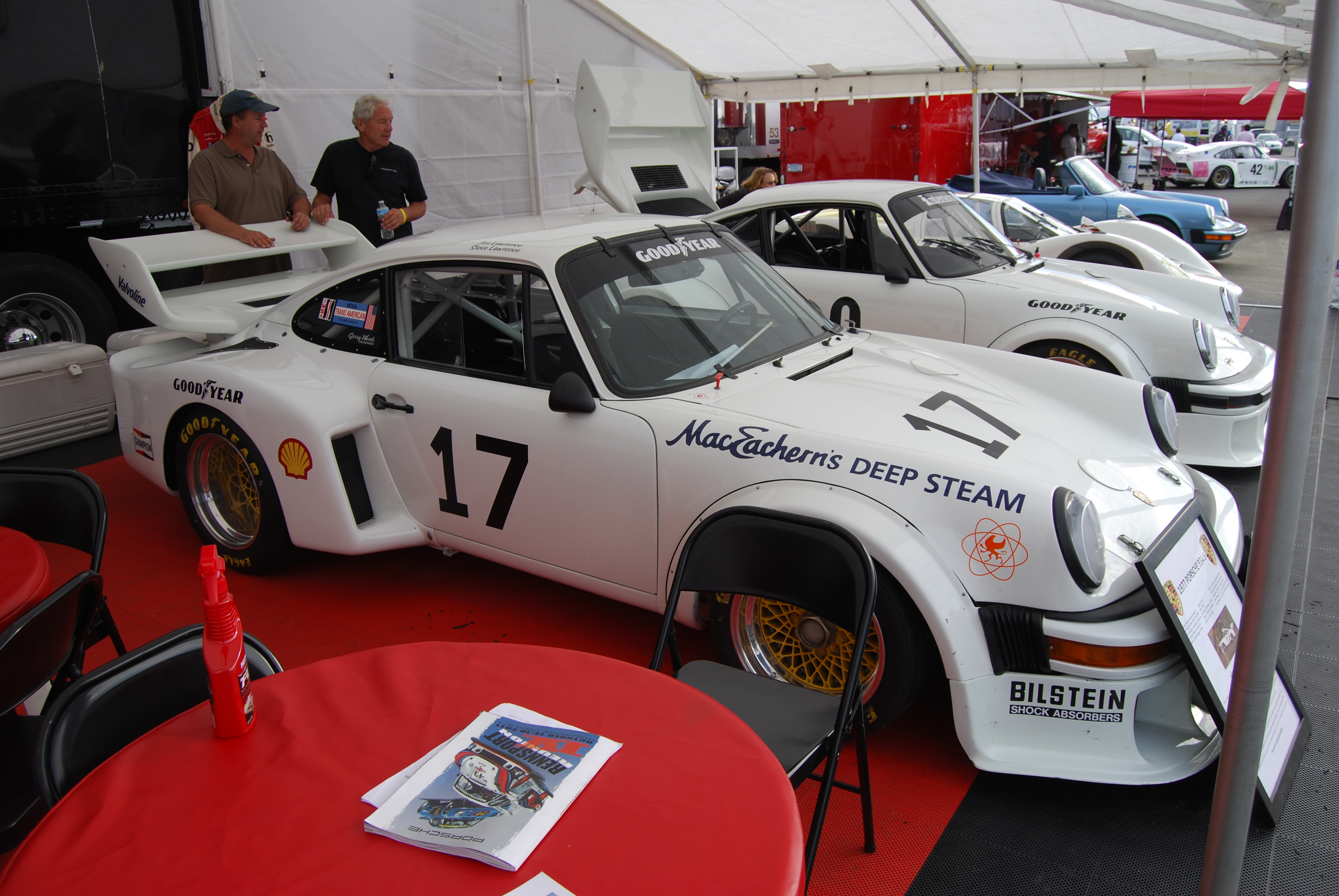
- Porsche 934/5, Paul Miller and Ludwig Heimrath Sr.'s winning car in the 1977 6 Hours of Mosport.
- Nationality: Canadian
- Born: August 11, 1934 Germany
- Died: March 19, 2021 (aged 86) Peterborough County, Ontario, Canada
- Relatives: Ludwig Heimrath (son)

Championship titles
- 1977: Trans-Am Series

Ludwig Heimrath, also called Ludwig Heimrath Sr. (August 11, 1934 – March 19, 2021) was a German-born Canadian racing driver. He won the Trans-Am Series championship in 1977, becoming the first person born outside the United States to win the championship since Horst Kwech in 1966.

== Career ==
Ludwig Heimrath emigrated from Germany to Canada in 1956. There, he settled in Toronto, where there was already a large community of Germans, and worked for VW Canada. Encouraged by VW Canada, Heimrath began his racing career in 1958 with a Volkswagen, racing at abandoned airport circuits around Ontario in the newly formed Deutscher Automobil Club. A year later, he switched to a Porsche 356 Super 1500 with which he reached third place in some non-championship races. In 1960, he entered a Porsche 356 Super 90 Speedster and won several races, such as the LASC Green Acres, MMGCC St. Eugene and the Harewood Acres. He drove his first long-distance race with a podium finish together with Francis Bradley at the 6-hour race at Harewood Acres in a Porsche 718 RS 60. Both achieved second place in the overall standings.

In 1961, the Canadian Sports Car Championship (CASC) was founded, in which Heimrath was able to secure the title with a Porsche 718 RS 60. He competed regularly in CASC championship races in the following years until 1967 and was able to repeat this success in 1964 with a Cooper T61M Monaco. In the intervening years 1962 and 1963, as well as in 1965, he became runner up.

At the same time, Heimrath drove McLaren Elva racing cars between 1965 and 1968 in races that counted towards the United States Road Racing Championship (USRRC) and Can-Am Championship.

From 1973, Heimrath started with a Porsche 911 S in the Trans-Am Series of the SCCA in the GTU class. In the following year he switched to a Porsche 911 Carrera RSR and drove there successfully in the GTO class until 1976. In 1977, he drove a Porsche 934/5 in the TA2 class of the SCCA. That year, he celebrated one of his greatest successes. At the 6-hour race in Mosport in 1977, which was part of the Trans-Am and the World Sportscar Championship, he achieved overall victory together with Paul Miller.

From 1978 to 1980, Heimrath drove a Porsche 935 in races for the Trans-Am and IMSA championships and was able to achieve several victories in addition to good placements. In 1981 and 1982, he drove a Porsche 924 Carrera GTR, with which he mostly had to give up the race prematurely. From 1981, he contested the long-distance races together with his son Ludwig Heimrath Jr. In 1983 and 1984, he mostly used Porsche 930 and Porsche 934 racing cars in the races.

Heimrath contested his last long-distance race with his son and Kees Kroesemeijer for Kremer Racing at the 1000 km race in Mosport in 1985 in a Porsche 956 and finished in fourth place.

In the following year, Heimrath drove in the Canadian Porsche 944 Cup championship and achieved eighth place in the season result. In 1988 and 1989, he competed in the Canadian Porsche 944 Turbo Cup championship and finished in 15th and 8th place respectively. In 1997, he started with a Porsche 968 in the Canadian GT Challenge Cup in the GT2 class and won the championship straight away. In the following years until 2000, he drove in this championship.

Heimrath competed several times in his racing career in the 24 Hours of Daytona and the 12 Hours of Sebring. He achieved his best result in 1962 with Jerry Palivka in a Porsche 718 RSK with 26th place overall and second place in the S1.6 sports car classification. He drove his last 24-hour race together with his son in Daytona in 1984, which both had to finish prematurely.

In addition to the sports car races, Heimrath also contested a few formula races. In 1968 and 1969 he took part in a few runs for the USAC championship without success. In 1970, he started for one season in the Canadian Formula A championship.

In 2000, Heimrath was inducted into the Canadian Motorsport Hall of Fame. That same year he officially retired from professional motorsport. He continued to compete at local motorsport events.

== Death ==
Heimrath died on March 19, 2021, of pancreatic cancer.
