= 1974 IMSA GT Championship =

4th season of the racing series organized by IMSA

Seasons
- ← 1973 1975 →

The 1974 Camel GT Challenge season was the 4th season of the IMSA GT Championship auto racing series. The series was for GTO and GTU class Grand tourer racing cars. It began April 21, 1974, and ended December 1, 1974, after twelve rounds. 1974 would be the first time that the series would leave the United States, with races in Canada and Mexico. It would also be the only time IMSA GT would leave northern North America (i.e. the United States and Canada). The TO and TU classes, which had been composed of former Trans Am Series cars from before the championship's debut, were dropped due to Trans Am having been "absorbed" by IMSA GT and thus becoming nigh indistinguishable from IMSA.

== Schedule ==
Some events were run twice, with each running counting as one round.

| Rnd | Race | Length | Circuit | Date |
|---|---|---|---|---|
| 1 | (United States) Atlanta 6 Hour | 6 Hours | Road Atlanta | April 21 |
| 2 | (United States) Monterey Triple Crown | 100 mi (160 km) | Laguna Seca Raceway | May 12 |
| 3 | (United States) Monterey Triple Crown | 100 mi (160 km) | Laguna Seca Raceway | May 12 |
| 4 | (United States) Ontario 4 Hour | 4 Hours | Ontario Motor Speedway | May 19 |
| 5 | (United States) Mid-Ohio Twin 6s | 5 Hours | Mid-Ohio Sports Car Course | June 30 |
| 6 | (United States) Paul Revere 250 | 250 mi (400 km) | Daytona International Speedway | July 4 |
| 7 | (United States) Bama 200 | 200 mi (320 km) | Talladega Superspeedway | August 10 |
| 8 | (United States) Charlotte 300 | 300 mi (480 km) | Charlotte Motor Speedway | August 18 |
| 9 | (United States) Lime Rock 100 | 100 mi (160 km) | Lime Rock Park | September 2 |
| 10 | (United States) Lime Rock 100 | 100 mi (160 km) | Lime Rock Park | September 2 |
| 11 | 1000 km of Mexico City | 1,000 km (620 mi) | Magdalena Mixhuca | October 20 |
| 12 | (United States) Daytona Finale | 250 mi (400 km) | Daytona International Speedway | December 1 |

== Season results ==
| Rnd | Circuit | GTO Winning Team | GTU Winning Team | Results |
| Rnd | Circuit | GTO Winning Drivers | GTU Winning Drivers | Results |
|---|---|---|---|---|
| 1 | Road Atlanta | #14 Paris Properties | #51 Johnson-Bozzani Porsche-Audi | Results |
| 1 | Road Atlanta | (United States) Al Holbert (United States) Elliot Forbes-Robinson | (United States) Michael Sherwin (United States) Freddy Baker | Results |
| 2 | Laguna Seca | #81 F.A.R. West Racing | #45 F.A.R. Performance | Results |
| 2 | Laguna Seca | (United States) Elliot Forbes-Robinson | (United States) Walt Maas | Results |
| 3 | Laguna Seca | #0 Toad Hall Motor Racing | #45 F.A.R. Performance | Results |
| 3 | Laguna Seca | (United States) Milt Minter | (United States) Walt Maas | Results |
| 4 | Ontario | #59 Brumos Porsche-Audi | #45 F.A.R. Performance | Results |
| 4 | Ontario | (United States) Peter Gregg | (United States) Walt Maas (United States) Frank Leary | Results |
| 5 | Mid-Ohio | #14 Holbert's Porsche/Audi | #77 Bruce Jennings | Results |
| 5 | Mid-Ohio | (United States) Al Holbert (United States) Peter Gregg | (United States) Bruce Jennings (United States) Bob Beasley | Results |
| 6 | Daytona | #4 Applejack Racing | #79 Juan Montalvo | Results |
| 6 | Daytona | (United States) Hurley Haywood | (Colombia) Juan Montalvo | Results |
| 7 | Talladega | #48 John Greenwood Racing | #89 Barrick Motor Racing | Results |
| 7 | Talladega | (United States) Milt Minter | (United States) Don Parish | Results |
| 8 | Charlotte | #59 Brumos Porsche-Audi | #46 Spencer Buzbee | Results |
| 8 | Charlotte | (United States) Peter Gregg | (United States) Spencer Buzbee (United States) Craig Ross | Results |
| 9 | Lime Rock | #59 Brumos Porsche-Audi | #58 Adrian Gang | Results |
| 9 | Lime Rock | (United States) Peter Gregg | (United States) Adrian Gang | Results |
| 10 | Lime Rock | #1 Toad Hall Motor Racing | #2 Tom Ciccone | Results |
| 10 | Lime Rock | (United States) Michael Keyser | (United States) Tom Ciccone | Results |
| 11 | Mexico City | #15 Héctor Rebaque Sr. | #58 Adrian Gang | Results |
| 11 | Mexico City | (Mexico) Guillermo Rojas (Mexico) Héctor Rebaque (Mexico) Fred van Beuren, Jr. | (United States) Adrian Gang (United States) Dennis Aase | Results |
| 12 | Daytona | #75 John Greenwood | #79 Juan Montalvo | Results |
| 12 | Daytona | (United States) John Greenwood | (Colombia) Juan Montalvo | Results |
