= 1976 IMSA GT Championship =

6th season of the racing series

Seasons
- ← 1975 1977 →

The 1976 Camel GT Challenge season was the 6th season of the IMSA GT Championship auto racing series. The series was for GTO and GTU class Grand tourer racing cars. It began on January 31, 1976, and ended on November 28, 1976, after fifteen rounds.

== Schedule ==
Rnd	Race	Length	Circuit	Date
1	24 Hours of Daytona	24 Hours	Daytona International Speedway	January 31; February 1
2	12 Hours of Sebring	12 Hours	Sebring International Raceway	March 20
3	Road Atlanta 100	100 mi (160 km)	Road Atlanta	April 11
4	Monterey Triple Crown	100 mi (160 km)	Laguna Seca Raceway	May 2
5	International Motorsports Spectacular	100 mi (160 km)	Ontario Motor Speedway	May 9
6	Coca-Cola Lime Rock	100 mi (160 km)	Lime Rock Park	May 31
7	Twin 200s	100 mi (160 km)	Mid-Ohio Sports Car Course	June 6
8	Paul Revere 250	250 mi (400 km)	Daytona International Speedway	July 4
9	Coca-Cola Sears Point	100 mi (160 km)	Sears Point International Raceway	July 25
10	'Bama 200	120 mi (190 km)	Talladega Superspeedway	August 7
11	Pocono 100	100 mi (160 km)	Pocono International Raceway	August 15
12	Mid-Ohio 6 Hours	6 Hours	Mid-Ohio Sports Car Course	August 29
13	WZGC 93 FM Camel GT	500 km (310 mi)	Road Atlanta	September 19
14	Shasta Monterey Grand Prix	100 mi (160 km)	Laguna Seca Raceway	October 3
15	Daytona Finale	250 mi (400 km)	Daytona International Speedway	November 28

== Season results ==
Rnd	Circuit	GTO Winning Team	GTU Winning Team	Results
Rnd	Circuit	GTO Winning Drivers	GTU Winning Drivers	Results
1	Daytona	#59 BMW of North America	#42 BHR Porsche	Results
1	Daytona	(United States) Peter Gregg (United Kingdom) Brian Redman	(United States) Bob Hindson (United States) Dick Davenport (United States) Frank Carney	Results
2	Sebring	#14 G. W. Dickinson/Holbert Porsche-Audi	#67 Havatampa Cigar	Results
2	Sebring	(United States) Al Holbert (United States) Michael Keyser	(United States) Dave White (United States) David McClain	Results
3	Road Atlanta	#14 Holbert/Dickinson Racing	#47 Transcendental Racing	Results
3	Road Atlanta	(United States) Al Holbert	(United States) Brad Frisselle	Results
4	Laguna Seca	#14 Holbert/Dickinson Racing	#45 Carlsen Porsche/Audi	Results
4	Laguna Seca	(United States) Al Holbert	(United States) Walt Maas	Results
5	Ontario	Jim Busby	Porsche	Results
5	Ontario	(United States) Jim Bubsy	(United States) Walt Maas	Results
6	Lime Rock	George Dyer	Transcendental Racing	Results
6	Lime Rock	(United States) George Dyer	(United States) Brad Frisselle	Results
7	Mid-Ohio	#1 Chevrolet	#47 Transcendental Racing	Results
7	Mid-Ohio	(United States) Michael Keyser	(United States) Brad Frisselle	Results
8	Daytona	#14 Chevrolet	Transcendental Racing	Results
8	Daytona	(United States) Al Holbert	(United States) Brad Frisselle	Results
9	Sears Point	#61 Jim Busby	#45 Walt Maas	Results
9	Sears Point	(United States) Jim Bubsy	(United States) Walt Maas	Results
10	Talladega	BMW	#47 Transcendental Racing	Results
10	Talladega	(United States) Peter Gregg	(United States) Brad Frisselle	Results
11	Pocono	#14 Chevrolet	Bob Sharp Racing	Results
11	Pocono	(United States) Al Holbert	(United States) Elliot Forbes-Robinson	Results
12	Mid-Ohio	Busby Racing	Transcendental Racing	Results
12	Mid-Ohio	(United States) Jim Bubsy	(United States) Brad Frisselle (United States) John Morton	Results
13	Road Atlanta	#14 Dickinson/Holbert Racing	#47 Transcendental Racing	Results
13	Road Atlanta	(United States) Al Holbert	(United States) Brad Frisselle (United States) John Morton	Results
14	Laguna Seca	#61 Busby Racing	#45 Garretson Enterprises	Results
14	Laguna Seca	(United States) Jim Bubsy	(United States) Walt Maas	Results
15	Daytona	#1 Chevrolet	#47 Transcendental Racing	Results
15	Daytona	(United States) Michael Keyser	(United States) Brad Frisselle	Results
