= 1983 IMSA GT Championship =

13th season of the racing series organized by IMSA

Seasons
- ← 1982 1984 →

The 1983 Camel GT Championship season was the 13th season of the IMSA GT Championship auto racing series. It was for GTP class prototypes and GTO and GTU class Grand Tourer-style racing cars. It began February 5, 1983, and ended November 27, 1983, after seventeen rounds.

== Schedule ==
The GT and Prototype classes did not participate in all events, nor did they race together at shorter events. Races marked with All had all classes on track at the same time.

Rnd	Race	Length	Class	Circuit	Date
1	24 Hour Pepsi Challenge	24 Hours	All	Daytona International Speedway	February 5 February 6
2	Budweiser Grand Prix of Miami	100 km	GTU	Streets of Miami	February 27
2	Budweiser Grand Prix of Miami	3 Hours	GTP	Streets of Miami	February 27
2	Budweiser Grand Prix of Miami	100 km	GTO	Streets of Miami	February 27
3	Coca-Cola Classic 12 Hours of Sebring	12 Hours	All	Sebring International Raceway	March 19
4	Road Atlanta Nissan/Datsun 500	500 km	All	Road Atlanta	April 10
5	Los Angeles Times/Datsun Grand Prix	6 Hours	All	Riverside International Raceway	April 24
6	Monterey Triple Crown	45 Minutes	GTU	Laguna Seca Raceway	May 1
6	Monterey Triple Crown	100 Miles	GTP/GTO	Laguna Seca Raceway	May 1
7	Charlotte Camel GT 500	500 km	All	Charlotte Motor Speedway	May 15
8	Coca-Cola 500	3 Hours	All	Lime Rock Park	May 30
9	Lumbermen's 6 Hours	6 Hours	All	Mid-Ohio Sports Car Course	June 19
10	Paul Revere 250	250 Miles	All	Daytona International Speedway	July 4
11	Pepsi Grand Prix	500 km	All	Brainerd International Raceway	July 10
12	Ford California Grand Prix	3 Hours	All	Sears Point Raceway	July 24
13	G.I. Joe's Grand Prix	3 Hours	All	Portland International Raceway	July 31
14	Labatt's GT	6 Hours	All	Mosport Park	August 14
15	Road America Pabst 500	500 Miles	All	Road America	August 21
16	Grand Prix of Pocono	500 Miles	All	Pocono Raceway	September 11
17	Eastern Airlines 3 Hours of Daytona	3 Hours	All	Daytona International Speedway	November 27

== Season results ==
Rnd	Circuit	GTP Winning Team	GTO Winning Team	GTU Winning Team	Results
Rnd	Circuit	GTP Winning Drivers	GTO Winning Drivers	GTU Winning Drivers	Results
1	Daytona	(United States) #6 Henn's Swap Shop	(United States) #7 Racing Beat	(United States) #92 Kent Racing	Results
1	Daytona	(United States) Preston Henn (United States) A. J. Foyt (France) Bob Wollek (France) Claude Ballot-Léna	(United States) Pete Halsmer (United States) Bob Reed (United States) Rick Knoop	(United States) Lee Mueller (United States) Hugh McDonough (United States) Terry Visger	Results
2	Miami	(United States) #41 Holbert Racing	(United States) #4 Stratagraph	(United States) #38 Mandeville Auto Tech	Results
2	Miami	(United States) Al Holbert	(United States) Gene Felton	(United States) Roger Mandeville	Results
3	Sebring	(United States) #5 Bob Akin Motor Racing	(United States) #9 Personalized Autohaus^{†}	(United States) #66 Mike Meyer Racing	Results
3	Sebring	(United States) Bob Akin (United States) Dale Whittington (United States) John O'Steen	(United States) Wayne Baker (United States) Jim Mullen (United States) Kees Nierop	(United States) Jack Dunham (United States) Jeff Kline (United States) Jon Compton	Results
4	Road Atlanta	(United States) #44 Group 44	(United States) #9 Personalized Autohaus	(United States) #32 Alderman Datsun	Results
4	Road Atlanta	(United States) Bob Tullius (Canada) Bill Adam	(United States) Wayne Baker (United States) Jim Mullen	(United States) George Alderman	Results
5	Riverside	(United Kingdom) #2 John Fitzpatrick Racing	(United States) #9 Personalized Autohaus	(United States) #98 All American Racers	Results
5	Riverside	(United Kingdom) John Fitzpatrick (United Kingdom) David Hobbs (United Kingdom) Derek Bell	(United States) Wayne Baker (United States) Jim Mullen (United States) Kes Nierop	(United States) Wally Dallenbach Jr. (United States) Whitney Ganz (United States) Dennis Aase	Results
6	Laguna Seca	(United States) #14 Holbert Racing	(Colombia) #55 B de T Racing	(Netherlands) #16 Boy Hayje	Results
6	Laguna Seca	(United States) Al Holbert	(Colombia) Diego Montoya	(Netherlands) Boy Hayje	Results
7	Charlotte	(United States) #14 Holbert Racing	(United States) #9 Personalized Autohaus	(United States) #98 All American Racers	Results
7	Charlotte	(United States) Al Holbert (United States) Jim Trueman	(United States) Wayne Baker (United States) Jim Mullen	(United States) Wally Dallenbach Jr. (Netherlands) Boy Hayje	Results
8	Lime Rock	(United States) #44 Group 44	(Colombia) #55 B de T Racing	(United States) #95 Leitzinger Racing	Results
8	Lime Rock	(United States) Bob Tullius (Canada) Bill Adam	(Colombia) Diego Montoya	(United States) Bob Leitzinger (United States) Logan Blackburn	Results
9	Mid-Ohio	(United States) #14 Holbert Racing	(United States) #4 Stratagraph	(United States) #82 Western Airlines	Results
9	Mid-Ohio	(United States) Al Holbert (United States) Doc Bundy (United States) Bobby Rahal	(United States) Billy Hagan (United States) Gene Felton	(United States) Jack Baldwin (United States) Joe Varde	Results
10	Daytona	(United States) #6 Henn's Swap Shop	(United States) #4 Stratagraph	(United States) #63 RPG 500 Racing	Results
10	Daytona	(United States) Hurley Haywood (United States) A. J. Foyt	(United States) Billy Hagan (United States) Gene Felton	(United States) Jim Downing	Results
11	Brainerd	(United States) #14 Holbert Racing	(United States) #81 Electramotive	(United States) #38 Mandeville Auto Tech	Results
11	Brainerd	(United States) Al Holbert (United States) Jim Trueman	(United States) Tony Adamowicz (United States) Don Devendorf	(United States) Roger Mandeville (United States) Amos Johnson	Results
12	Sears Point	(United States) #14 Holbert Racing	(United States) #83 Electramotive	(United States) #82 Trinity Racing	Results
12	Sears Point	(United States) Al Holbert (United States) Jim Trueman	(United States) Tony Adamowicz (United States) Don Devendorf	(United States) Jack Baldwin (United States) Joe Varde	Results
13	Portland	(United States) #14 Holbert Racing	(United States) #83 Electramotive	(United States) #38 Mandeville Auto Tech	Results
13	Portland	(United States) Al Holbert	(United States) Tony Adamowicz (United States) Don Devendorf	(United States) Roger Mandeville (United States) Amos Johnson	Results
14	Mosport	(United States) #44 Group 44	(United States) #7 Mazda	(United States) #38 Mandeville Auto Tech	Results
14	Mosport	(United States) Bob Tullius (Canada) Bill Adam	(United States) Rick Knoop (United States) John Morton	(United States) Roger Mandeville (United States) Amos Johnson	Results
15	Road America	(United States) #06 Team Zakspeed USA	(United States) #83 Electramotive	(United States) #38 Mandeville Auto Tech	Results
15	Road America	(United States) Tim Coconis (Germany) Klaus Ludwig	(United States) Tony Adamowicz (United States) Don Devendorf	(United States) Roger Mandeville (United States) Amos Johnson	Results
16	Pocono	(United States) #44 Group 44	(United States) #4 Stratagraph	(United States) #63 RGP 500 Racing	Results
16	Pocono	(United States) Bob Tullius (United States) Doc Bundy	(United States) Billy Hagan (United States) Gene Felton	(United States) Jim Downing (United States) John Maffucci	Results
17	Daytona	(United States) #14 Holbert Racing	(El Salvador) #18 Fomfor Racing	(United States) #87 Porsche	Results
17	Daytona	(United States) Al Holbert (United States) Jim Trueman	(El Salvador) Francisco "Fomfor" Zablah	(United States) Bruce Leven (United States) John Schneider	Results

† - #9 Personalized Autohaus won the 12 Hours of Sebring overall.
