= 1975 IMSA GT Championship =

5th season of the racing series organized by IMSA

Seasons
- ← 1974 1976 →

The 1975 Camel GT Challenge season was the 5th season of the IMSA GT Championship auto racing series. The series was for GTO and GTU class Grand tourer racing cars. It began February 1, 1975, and ended November 30, 1975, after seventeen rounds.

== Schedule ==
Some events were run twice, with each running counting as one round.

Rnd	Race	Length	Circuit	Date
1	24 Hours of Daytona	24 Hours	Daytona International Speedway	February 1 February 2
2	12 Hours of Sebring	12 Hours	Sebring International Raceway	March 21
3	Road Atlanta 100	100 mi (160 km)	Road Atlanta	April 20
4	Road Atlanta 100	100 mi (160 km)	Road Atlanta	April 20
5	Monterey Triple Crown	100 mi (160 km)	Laguna Seca Raceway	May 4
6	Monterey Triple Crown	100 mi (160 km)	Laguna Seca Raceway	May 4
7	Six Hours of Riverside	6 Hours	Riverside International Raceway	May 10
8	Schaefer 350	100 mi (160 km)	Lime Rock Park	May 26
9	Schaefer 350	100 mi (160 km)	Lime Rock Park	May 26
10	Mid-Ohio 100	100 mi (160 km)	Mid-Ohio Sports Car Course	June 1
11	Mosport 100	100 mi (160 km)	Mosport Park	June 14
12	Paul Revere 250	250 mi (400 km)	Daytona International Speedway	July 4
13	Mid-America 100	100 mi (160 km)	Mid-America Raceway	July 20
14	Mid-America 100	100 mi (160 km)	Mid-America Raceway	July 20
15	Talladega 1 Hour	1 Hour	Talladega Superspeedway	August 9
16	Mid-Ohio 6 Hours	6 Hours	Mid-Ohio Sports Car Course	August 24
17	Championship Finals	250 mi (400 km)	Daytona International Speedway	November 30

== Season results ==
Rnd	Circuit	GTO Winning Team	GTU Winning Team	Results
Rnd	Circuit	GTO Winning Drivers	GTU Winning Drivers	Results
1	Daytona	#59 Brumos Porsche	#60 Rusty Bond	Results
1	Daytona	(United States) Peter Gregg (United States) Hurley Haywood	(United States) Rusty Bond (United States) George Rollin (United States) John Belperche	Results
2	Sebring	#25 BMW Motorsport	#44 Montura Ranch Estates	Results
2	Sebring	(Germany) Hans-Joachim Stuck (United Kingdom) Brian Redman (Canada) Allan Moffat	(United States) Tony Garcia (United States) Albert Naon (United States) John Freyre	Results
3	Road Atlanta	#59 Porsche	#33 Bob Sharp Racing	Results
3	Road Atlanta	(United States) Peter Gregg	(United States) Bob Sharp	Results
4	Road Atlanta	#14 Porsche	#33 Bob Sharp Racing	Results
4	Road Atlanta	(United States) Al Holbert	(United States) Bob Sharp	Results
5	Laguna Seca	#59 Porsche	Datsun	Results
5	Laguna Seca	(United States) Peter Gregg	(United States) Walt Maas	Results
6	Laguna Seca	#25 BMW Motorsport	#33 Bob Sharp Racing	Results
6	Laguna Seca	(Germany) Hans-Joachim Stuck	(United States) Bob Sharp	Results
7	Riverside	#25 BMW Motorsport	#33 Bob Sharp Racing	Results
7	Riverside	(Germany) Hans-Joachim Stuck (Austria) Dieter Quester	(United States) Bob Sharp (United States) Walt Maas	Results
8	Lime Rock	Porsche	Bob Sharp Racing	Results
8	Lime Rock	(United States) Peter Gregg	(United States) Bob Sharp	Results
9	Lime Rock	Porsche	Bob Sharp Racing	Results
9	Lime Rock	(United States) Al Holbert	(United States) Bob Sharp	Results
10	Mid-Ohio	Porsche	Bob Sharp Racing	Results
10	Mid-Ohio	(United States) Al Holbert	(United States) Bob Sharp	Results
11	Mosport	#6 G. W. Dickinson	#47 Transcendental Racing	Results
11	Mosport	(United States) Hurley Haywood	(United States) Brad Frisselle	Results
12	Daytona	BMW Motorsport	Juan Montalvo	Results
12	Daytona	(Germany) Hans-Joachim Stuck	(Colombia) Juan Montalvo	Results
13	Mid-America	Porsche	Transcendental Racing	Results
13	Mid-America	(United States) Al Holbert	(United States) Brad Frisselle	Results
14	Mid-America	Porsche	Bob Sharp Racing	Results
14	Mid-America	(United States) Al Holbert	(United States) Bob Sharp	Results
15	Talladega	BMW Motorsport	Transcendental Racing	Results
15	Talladega	(Germany) Hans-Joachim Stuck	(United States) Brad Frisselle	Results
16	Mid-Ohio	#14 Porsche	Bob Sharp Racing	Results
16	Mid-Ohio	(United States) Al Holbert (United States) Elliot Forbes-Robinson	(United States) Bob Sharp (United States) Jim Fitzgerald	Results
17	Daytona	#76 John Greenwood	#33 Bob Sharp Racing	Results
17	Daytona	(United States) John Greenwood	(United States) Bob Sharp	Results
