= 1972 IMSA GT Championship =

2nd season of the racing series organized by IMSA

Seasons
- ← 1971 1973 →

The 1972 Camel GT Challenge season was the 2nd season of the IMSA GT Championship auto racing series. It was for Grand Tourer-style racing cars which ran in the GTO and GTU classes, as well as former Trans Am Series cars in the TO and TU classes. It began December 4, 1971, and ended November 19, 1972, after ten rounds.

== Schedule ==
Rnd	Race	Length	Circuit	Date
1	Alamo 200	200 mi (320 km)	Texas World Speedway	December 4
2	Starlight 3 Hour	3 Hours	Daytona International Raceway	April 1
3	Danville 250	250 mi (400 km)	Virginia International Raceway	April 16
4	Camel 200	200 mi (320 km)	Lime Rock Park	May 29
5	Camel 3 Hour	3 Hours	Donnybrooke International Raceway	June 11
6	Camel 6 Hour	6 Hours	Mid-Ohio Sports Car Course	July 9
7	Inver House 'Bama 200	200 mi (320 km)	Alabama International Speedway	August 5
8	Watkins Glen 500	500 km (310 mi)	Watkins Glen International	September 10
9	Bryar 3 Hour	3 Hours	Bryar Motorsport Park	September 24
10	Presidential 250	250 mi (400 km)	Daytona International Speedway	November 19

== Season results ==
Overall winner in bold.

Rnd	Circuit	GTO Winning Team	GTU Winning Team	TO Winning Team	TU Winning Team	Results
Rnd	Circuit	GTO Winning Drivers	GTU Winning Drivers	TO Winning Drivers	TU Winning Drivers	Results
1	Texas	#42 Corvette	#59 Peter Gregg	**#48 Mustang**	#16 2002	Results
1	Texas	(United States) Garrett Waddall	(United States) Peter Gregg (United States) Hurley Haywood	**(Mexico) Juan Izquierdo** **(Mexico) Daniel Muniz**	(United States) Ross Norburn (United States) Phil Dermer	Results
2	Daytona	**#23 Corvette**	#1 Toad Hall Racing	#41 Mustang	#11 2002	Results
2	Daytona	**(United States) Charlie Kemp** **(United States) Wilbur Pickett**	(United States) Michael Keyser (United States) Bob Beasley	(United States) Jerry Crew (United States) Dan Moore	(United States) Byron Morris	Results
3	Virginia	#99 Phil Currin Corvette	**#59 Peter Gregg**	#27 Lou Statzer	#8 Carson Baird	Results
3	Virginia	(United States) Phil Currin	**(United States) Peter Gregg** **(United States) Hurley Haywood**	(United States) Lou Statzer (United States) Tom Dutton	(United States) Carson Baird (United States) Joe Amato	Results
4	Lime Rock	#99 Phil Currin Corvette	**#31 Porsche**	#15 Camaro	#86 Alfa Romeo	Results
4	Lime Rock	(United States) Phil Currin	**(United States) Jim Locke** **(United States) Bob Bailey**	(United States) Jocko Maggiacomo Jr.	(United States) Joe Diamante (United States) Walt Simendinger	Results
5	Donnybrooke	**#22 Corvette**	#1 Toad Hall Racing	#21 Thiokol	#8 Carson Amato	Results
5	Donnybrooke	**(United States) Denny Long**	(United States) Bob Beasley (United States) Levon Pentecost	(United States) Russ Norburn (United States) Robert Hennig	(United States) Joe Amato (United States) Carson Baird	Results
6	Mid-Ohio	#48 Greenwood Racing	**#1 Toad Hall Racing**	#17 Camaro	#24 Libra Intl. Racing	Results
6	Mid-Ohio	(United States) John Greenwood (United States) Marshall Robbins	**(United States) Bob Beasley** **(United States) Michael Keyser**	(United States) Vince Gimondo (United States) Billy Dingham	(United States) John Buffum (United States) Bert Everett	Results
7	Alabama	**#2 Holiday Inn Corvette**	#59 Peter Gregg	#47 Camaro	#88 Opel	Results
7	Alabama	**(United States) Wilbur Pickett**	(United States) Hurley Haywood	(United States) Tom Nehl	(United States) Dennis Shaw (United States) Steve Coleman	Results
8	Watkins Glen	#48 Corvette	**#59 Peter Gregg**	#88 Camaro	#16 Gemini Racing	Results
8	Watkins Glen	(United States) Charles West	**(United States) Peter Gregg** **(United States) Hurley Haywood**	(Canada) Maurice Carter (United States) Paul Nichter	(United States) Phil Dermer	Results
9	Bryar	#41 Corvette	#76 Silverstone Racing	**#88 Camaro**	#84 2002	Results
9	Bryar	(United States) Bud Deshler (United States) Rodney Harris	(United States) George Stone	**(Canada) Maurice Carter** **(United States) Paul Nichter**	(United States) Hans Ziereis (United States) Andy Petery	Results
10	Daytona	**#96 Camaro**	#2 Toad Hall Racing	#88 Camaro	#6 Gemini Racing	Results
10	Daytona	**(United States) Gene Felton**	(United States) Bob Beasley (United States) Michael Keyser	(Canada) Maurice Carter	(United States) Ross Norburn	Results

== Constructors' Championship ==
Points are awarded to the top six in each class in the order of 9-6-4-3-2-1.

=== GTO standings ===
Pos	Constructor	Rd 1	Rd 2	Rd 3	Rd 4	Rd 5	Rd 6	Rd 7	Rd 8	Rd 9	Rd 10	Total
1	(United States) Chevrolet	9	9	9	9	9	9	9	9	9	9	90
2	(United States) Shelby		4		6							10

=== GTU standings ===
Pos	Constructor	Rd 1	Rd 2	Rd 3	Rd 4	Rd 5	Rd 6	Rd 7	Rd 8	Rd 9	Rd 10	Total
1	(Germany) Porsche	9	9	9	9	9	9	9	9	9	9	90
2	(Sweden) Saab									3		3
3	(United Kingdom) Lotus	1									2	3

=== TO standings ===
Pos	Constructor	Rd 1	Rd 2	Rd 3	Rd 4	Rd 5	Rd 6	Rd 7	Rd 8	Rd 9	Rd 10	Total
1	(United States) Chevrolet	3	6	9	9		9	9	9	9	9	72
2	(United States) Ford	9	9	4	6						6	34
3	(United States) AMC			1	1	9	6					17

=== TU standings ===
Pos	Constructor	Rd 1	Rd 2	Rd 3	Rd 4	Rd 5	Rd 6	Rd 7	Rd 8	Rd 9	Rd 10	Total
1	(Germany) BMW	9	9	6	2		4		9	9	9	57
2	(United States) Ford	4	6	9	6	9	9	4	3	2	3	54
3	(Italy) Alfa Romeo				9	6	6	6	4	6		37
4	(Germany) Opel		4	4		2		9		3	1	23
5	(Italy) Fiat		3	3		4						10
6	(Japan) Datsun	6			3							9
7	(France) Renault					3						3
8=	(Sweden) Volvo		1									1
8=	(United Kingdom) Austin			1								1
