= 1971 IMSA GT Championship =

1st season of the racing series organized by IMSA

Seasons
- ← none 1972 →

The 1971 IMSA GT Series season was the inaugural season of the IMSA GT Championship auto racing series. It was for Grand Tourer-style racing cars which ran in the GTO and GTU classes, as well as former Trans Am Series cars in the TO and TU classes. It began April 18, 1971, and ended November 21, 1971, after six rounds.

== Schedule ==
Rnd	Race	Length	Circuit	Date
1	Danville 300	300 mi (480 km)	Virginia International Raceway	April 18
2	Carter Hall GT	200 mi (320 km)	Alabama International Motor Speedway	May 15
3	Piedmont 3 Hour	3 Hours	Charlotte Motor Speedway	May 23
4	Bridgehampton 3 Hours	3 Hours	Bridgehampton Race Circuit	June 27
5	Summit Point 250	250 mi (400 km)	Summit Point Raceway	September 19
6	200 Miles of Daytona Beach	200 mi (320 km)	Daytona International Speedway	November 21

== Season results ==
Overall winner in bold.

Rnd	Circuit	GTO Winning Team	GTU Winning Team	TO Winning Team	TU Winning Team	Results
Rnd	Circuit	GTO Winning Drivers	GTU Winning Drivers	TO Winning Drivers	TU Winning Drivers	Results
1	Virginia	#57 Corvette	**#59 Brumos Porsche-Audi**	#21 Javelin	#71 Opel	Results
1	Virginia	(United States) Dave Heinz	**(United States) Peter Gregg** **(United States) Hurley Haywood**	(United States) Robert Hennig (United States) Richard Staples	(United States) Amos Johnson (United States) Roger Mandeville (United States) Bunny Diggett	Results
2	Alabama	**#57 Corvette**	#59 Brumos Porsche-Audi	#21 Javelin	#21 Mini	Results
2	Alabama	**(United States) Dave Heinz**	(United States) Peter Gregg (United States) Hurley Haywood	(United States) Robert Hennig	(United States) Joe Richardson	Results
3	Charlotte	**#57 Corvette**	#59 Brumos Porsche-Audi	#21 Javelin	#64 Mini	Results
3	Charlotte	**(United States) Dave Heinz** **(United States) Or Costanzo**	(United States) Peter Gregg (United States) Hurley Haywood	(United States) Robert Hennig (United States) Bob Beasley	(United States) Anthony Milne (Canada) Richard Stevens	Results
4	Bridgehampton	#18 Es-Pa Racing	**#59 Brumos Porsche-Audi**	#84 Camaro	#85 Alfa Romeo	Results
4	Bridgehampton	(United States) Rodney Harris (United States) John Paul Sr.	**(United States) Peter Gregg** **(United States) Hurley Haywood**	(United States) George Lisberg (United States) Ray Cuomo	(United States) Walt Simendinger (United States) Bob Heiberg	Results
5	Summit Point	#49 Mustang	**#59 Brumos Porsche-Audi**	#42 Camaro	#93 Jerry Walsh	Results
5	Summit Point	(United States) Lee McDonald (United States) Albert Pentrillo	**(United States) Peter Gregg** **(United States) Hurley Haywood**	(United States) Steve Ross	(United States) Jerry Walsh (United States) Lee Wiese	Results
6	Daytona	**#57 Corvette**	#34 911	#3 Camaro	#11 2002	Results
6	Daytona	**(United States) Don Yenko** **(United States) Dave Heinz**	(United States) Bill Cuddy	(United States) Tom Nehl (United States) Jim Fitzgerald	(United States) Byron Morris (United States) Clint Abernethy	Results

== Constructors' Championship ==
Points are awarded to the top six in each class in the order of 9-6-4-3-2-1.

=== GTO standings ===
Pos	Constructor	Rd 1	Rd 2	Rd 3	Rd 4	Rd 5	Rd 6	Total
1	(United States) Chevrolet	9	9	9	9	6	9	51
2	(United States) Shelby		4			9		13

=== GTU standings ===
Pos	Constructor	Rd 1	Rd 2	Rd 3	Rd 4	Rd 5	Rd 6	Total
1	(Germany) Porsche	9	9	9	9	9	9	54
2	(United Kingdom) Austin-Healey	1	1		1			3
3=	(United Kingdom) MG		2					2
3=	(Italy) Alfa Romeo				2			2
5	(United Kingdom) Lotus			1				1

=== TO standings ===
Pos	Constructor	Rd 1	Rd 2	Rd 3	Rd 4	Rd 5	Rd 6	Total
1	(United States) Chevrolet		6	6	9	9	9	39
2	(United States) AMC	9	9	9		1		28
3	(United States) Ford					2		2

=== TU standings ===
Pos	Constructor	Rd 1	Rd 2	Rd 3	Rd 4	Rd 5	Rd 6	Total
1	(United Kingdom) Austin	4	9	9	6	6		34
2	(Germany) BMW			6		4	9	19
3	(United States) Ford		3		3	9	4	19
4	(Italy) Alfa Romeo				9	3	6	18
5	(Germany) Opel	9	1	3				13
6	(Japan) Datsun		4	4	2			10
7	(Italy) Fiat	6		2				8
8	(Sweden) Saab						3	3
9	(Germany) Audi				1			1
