= 1990 DieHard 500 =

17th race of the 1990 NASCAR Winston Cup Series

Race details
- Race 17 of 29 in the 1990 NASCAR Winston Cup Series
- The 1990 DieHard 500 program cover, featuring Terry Labonte.
- Date: July 29, 1990
- Official name: 22nd Annual DieHard 500
- Location: Lincoln, Alabama, Talladega Superspeedway
- Course: Permanent racing facility
- Course length: 2.66 miles (4.28 km)
- Distance: 188 laps, 500.08 mi (804.8 km)
- Scheduled distance: 188 laps, 500.08 mi (804.8 km)
- Average speed: 174.43 miles per hour (280.72 km/h)
- Attendance: 70,000

Pole position
| Driver | Dale Earnhardt | Richard Childress Racing |
- Time: 49.742

Most laps led
| Driver | Dale Earnhardt | Richard Childress Racing |
- Laps: 134

Winner
| No. 3 | Dale Earnhardt | Richard Childress Racing |

Television in the United States
- Network: CBS
- Announcers: Ken Squier, Ned Jarrett, David Hobbs

Radio in the United States
- Radio: Motor Racing Network

The 1990 DieHard 500 was the 17th stock car race of the 1990 NASCAR Winston Cup Series season and the 22nd iteration of the event. The race was held on Sunday, July 29, 1990, before an audience of 70,000 in Lincoln, Alabama at Talladega Superspeedway, a 2.66 miles (4.28 km) permanent triangle-shaped superspeedway. The race took the scheduled 188 laps to complete. At race's end, Richard Childress Racing driver Dale Earnhardt dominated a majority of the race, leading 134 laps in the race to take his 45th career NASCAR Winston Cup Series victory and his sixth victory of the season. To fill out the top three, Melling Racing driver Bill Elliott and Hagan Racing driver Sterling Marlin would finish second and third, respectively.

== Background ==
The layout of Talladega Superspeedway, the venue where the race was held.

Talladega Superspeedway, originally known as Alabama International Motor Superspeedway (AIMS), is a motorsports complex located north of Talladega, Alabama. It is located on the former Anniston Air Force Base in the small city of Lincoln. The track is a tri-oval and was constructed in the 1960s by the International Speedway Corporation, a business controlled by the France family. Talladega is most known for its steep banking and the unique location of the start/finish line that's located just past the exit to pit road. The track currently hosts the NASCAR series such as the NASCAR Cup Series, Xfinity Series and the Camping World Truck Series. Talladega is the longest NASCAR oval, a 2.66-mile-long (4.28 km) tri-oval like the Daytona International Speedway, which also is a 2.5-mile-long (4.0 km) tri-oval.

=== Entry list ===
- (R) denotes rookie driver.

| # | Driver | Team | Make |
|---|---|---|---|
| 1 | Terry Labonte | Precision Products Racing | Oldsmobile |
| 01 | Mickey Gibbs | Gibbs Racing | Ford |
| 3 | Dale Earnhardt | Richard Childress Racing | Chevrolet |
| 4 | Ernie Irvan | Morgan–McClure Motorsports | Oldsmobile |
| 5 | Ricky Rudd | Hendrick Motorsports | Chevrolet |
| 6 | Mark Martin | Roush Racing | Ford |
| 7 | Alan Kulwicki | AK Racing | Ford |
| 8 | Bobby Hillin Jr. | Stavola Brothers Racing | Buick |
| 9 | Bill Elliott | Melling Racing | Ford |
| 10 | Derrike Cope | Whitcomb Racing | Chevrolet |
| 11 | Geoff Bodine | Junior Johnson & Associates | Ford |
| 12 | Hut Stricklin | Bobby Allison Motorsports | Buick |
| 14 | A. J. Foyt | A. J. Foyt Racing | Oldsmobile |
| 15 | Morgan Shepherd | Bud Moore Engineering | Ford |
| 17 | Jimmy Horton | Hendrick Motorsports | Chevrolet |
| 18 | Greg Sacks | Hendrick Motorsports | Chevrolet |
| 19 | Chad Little | Little Racing | Ford |
| 20 | Rob Moroso (R) | Moroso Racing | Oldsmobile |
| 21 | Dale Jarrett | Wood Brothers Racing | Ford |
| 25 | Ken Schrader | Hendrick Motorsports | Chevrolet |
| 26 | Brett Bodine | King Racing | Buick |
| 27 | Rusty Wallace | Blue Max Racing | Pontiac |
| 28 | Davey Allison | Robert Yates Racing | Ford |
| 29 | Phil Parsons | Diamond Ridge Motorsports | Pontiac |
| 30 | Michael Waltrip | Bahari Racing | Pontiac |
| 33 | Harry Gant | Leo Jackson Motorsports | Oldsmobile |
| 35 | Bill Venturini | Venturini Motorsports | Chevrolet |
| 42 | Kyle Petty | SABCO Racing | Pontiac |
| 43 | Richard Petty | Petty Enterprises | Pontiac |
| 47 | Jack Pennington (R) | Close Racing | Oldsmobile |
| 52 | Jimmy Means | Jimmy Means Racing | Pontiac |
| 57 | Jimmy Spencer | Osterlund Racing | Pontiac |
| 66 | Dick Trickle | Cale Yarborough Motorsports | Pontiac |
| 68 | Stanley Smith | TriStar Motorsports | Pontiac |
| 70 | J. D. McDuffie | McDuffie Racing | Pontiac |
| 71 | Dave Marcis | Marcis Auto Racing | Chevrolet |
| 72 | Tracy Leslie | Parker Racing | Oldsmobile |
| 73 | Rodney Combs | Barkdoll Racing | Oldsmobile |
| 75 | Rick Wilson | RahMoc Enterprises | Pontiac |
| 82 | Mark Stahl | Stahl Racing | Ford |
| 83 | Lake Speed | Speed Racing | Oldsmobile |
| 90 | Buddy Baker | Donlavey Racing | Ford |
| 94 | Sterling Marlin | Hagan Racing | Oldsmobile |
| 98 | Butch Miller | Travis Carter Enterprises | Chevrolet |

== Qualifying ==
Qualifying was split into two rounds. The first round was held on Thursday, July 26, at 3:00 PM EST. Each driver would have one lap to set a time. During the first round, the top 20 drivers in the round would be guaranteed a starting spot in the race. If a driver was not able to guarantee a spot in the first round, they had the option to scrub their time from the first round and try and run a faster lap time in a second round qualifying run, held on Friday, July 27, at 4:30 PM EST. As with the first round, each driver would have one lap to set a time. For this specific race, positions 21-40 would be decided on time, and depending on who needed it, a select amount of positions were given to cars who had not otherwise qualified but were high enough in owner's points; up to two were given.

Dale Earnhardt, driving for Richard Childress Racing, would win the pole, setting a time of 49.742 and an average speed of 192.513 miles per hour (309.820 km/h) in the first round.

Two drivers would fail to qualify.

=== Full qualifying results ===
| Pos. | # | Driver | Team | Make | Time | Speed |
|---|---|---|---|---|---|---|
| 1 | 3 | Dale Earnhardt | Richard Childress Racing | Chevrolet | 49.742 | 192.513 |
| 2 | 28 | Davey Allison | Robert Yates Racing | Ford | 49.961 | 191.670 |
| 3 | 42 | Kyle Petty | SABCO Racing | Pontiac | 49.972 | 191.627 |
| 4 | 6 | Mark Martin | Roush Racing | Ford | 50.022 | 191.436 |
| 5 | 7 | Alan Kulwicki | AK Racing | Ford | 50.149 | 190.951 |
| 6 | 20 | Rob Moroso (R) | Moroso Racing | Oldsmobile | 50.152 | 190.940 |
| 7 | 33 | Harry Gant | Leo Jackson Motorsports | Oldsmobile | 50.175 | 190.852 |
| 8 | 29 | Phil Parsons | Diamond Ridge Motorsports | Pontiac | 50.176 | 190.848 |
| 9 | 9 | Bill Elliott | Melling Racing | Ford | 50.204 | 190.742 |
| 10 | 15 | Morgan Shepherd | Bud Moore Engineering | Ford | 50.368 | 190.121 |
| 11 | 1 | Terry Labonte | Precision Products Racing | Oldsmobile | 50.478 | 189.706 |
| 12 | 68 | Stanley Smith | TriStar Motorsports | Pontiac | 50.480 | 189.699 |
| 13 | 11 | Geoff Bodine | Junior Johnson & Associates | Ford | 50.531 | 189.507 |
| 14 | 94 | Sterling Marlin | Hagan Racing | Oldsmobile | 50.567 | 189.373 |
| 15 | 17 | Jimmy Horton | Hendrick Motorsports | Chevrolet | 50.589 | 189.290 |
| 16 | 4 | Ernie Irvan | Morgan–McClure Motorsports | Chevrolet | 50.638 | 189.107 |
| 17 | 8 | Bobby Hillin Jr. | Stavola Brothers Racing | Buick | 50.700 | 188.876 |
| 18 | 26 | Brett Bodine | King Racing | Buick | 50.701 | 188.865 |
| 19 | 98 | Butch Miller | Travis Carter Enterprises | Chevrolet | 50.766 | 188.630 |
| 20 | 66 | Dick Trickle | Cale Yarborough Motorsports | Pontiac | 50.804 | 188.489 |
Failed to lock in Round 1
| 21 | 10 | Derrike Cope | Whitcomb Racing | Chevrolet | 50.361 | 190.147 |
| 22 | 21 | Dale Jarrett | Wood Brothers Racing | Ford | 50.807 | 188.478 |
| 23 | 52 | Jimmy Means | Jimmy Means Racing | Pontiac | 50.807 | 188.478 |
| 24 | 25 | Ken Schrader | Hendrick Motorsports | Chevrolet | 50.842 | 188.348 |
| 25 | 5 | Ricky Rudd | Hendrick Motorsports | Chevrolet | 50.926 | 188.038 |
| 26 | 27 | Rusty Wallace | Blue Max Racing | Pontiac | 50.944 | 187.971 |
| 27 | 47 | Jack Pennington (R) | Close Racing | Oldsmobile | 50.998 | 187.772 |
| 28 | 35 | Bill Venturini | Venturini Motorsports | Chevrolet | 51.001 | 187.761 |
| 29 | 14 | A. J. Foyt | A. J. Foyt Racing | Oldsmobile | 51.023 | 187.680 |
| 30 | 01 | Mickey Gibbs | Gibbs Racing | Ford | 51.031 | 187.651 |
| 31 | 57 | Jimmy Spencer | Osterlund Racing | Pontiac | 51.083 | 187.460 |
| 32 | 30 | Michael Waltrip | Bahari Racing | Pontiac | 51.084 | 187.456 |
| 33 | 19 | Chad Little | Little Racing | Ford | 51.099 | 187.401 |
| 34 | 72 | Tracy Leslie | Parker Racing | Oldsmobile | 51.123 | 187.313 |
| 35 | 71 | Dave Marcis | Marcis Auto Racing | Chevrolet | 51.154 | 187.199 |
| 36 | 90 | Buddy Baker | Donlavey Racing | Ford | 51.229 | 186.925 |
| 37 | 75 | Rick Wilson | RahMoc Enterprises | Oldsmobile | 51.320 | 186.594 |
| 38 | 18 | Greg Sacks | Hendrick Motorsports | Chevrolet | 51.322 | 186.587 |
| 39 | 83 | Lake Speed | Speed Racing | Oldsmobile | 51.331 | 186.554 |
| 40 | 82 | Mark Stahl | Stahl Racing | Ford | 51.333 | 186.547 |
Provisionals
| 41 | 12 | Hut Stricklin | Bobby Allison Motorsports | Buick | 54.044 | 177.189 |
| 42 | 43 | Richard Petty | Petty Enterprises | Pontiac | 53.684 | 178.377 |
Failed to qualify
| 43 | 73 | Rodney Combs | Barkdoll Racing | Oldsmobile | -* | -* |
| 44 | 70 | J. D. McDuffie | McDuffie Racing | Pontiac | -* | -* |
Official first round qualifying results
Official starting lineup

== Race results ==
| Fin | St | # | Driver | Team | Make | Laps | Led | Status | Pts | Winnings |
|---|---|---|---|---|---|---|---|---|---|---|
| 1 | 1 | 3 | Dale Earnhardt | Richard Childress Racing | Chevrolet | 188 | 134 | running | 185 | $152,975 |
| 2 | 9 | 9 | Bill Elliott | Melling Racing | Ford | 188 | 21 | running | 175 | $48,390 |
| 3 | 14 | 94 | Sterling Marlin | Hagan Racing | Oldsmobile | 188 | 10 | running | 170 | $34,050 |
| 4 | 5 | 7 | Alan Kulwicki | AK Racing | Ford | 188 | 0 | running | 160 | $24,750 |
| 5 | 25 | 5 | Ricky Rudd | Hendrick Motorsports | Chevrolet | 188 | 0 | running | 155 | $22,050 |
| 6 | 16 | 4 | Ernie Irvan | Morgan–McClure Motorsports | Chevrolet | 188 | 0 | running | 150 | $16,325 |
| 7 | 21 | 10 | Derrike Cope | Whitcomb Racing | Chevrolet | 188 | 0 | running | 146 | $16,350 |
| 8 | 3 | 42 | Kyle Petty | SABCO Racing | Pontiac | 188 | 3 | running | 147 | $16,350 |
| 9 | 4 | 6 | Mark Martin | Roush Racing | Ford | 188 | 0 | running | 138 | $18,570 |
| 10 | 17 | 8 | Bobby Hillin Jr. | Stavola Brothers Racing | Buick | 187 | 4 | running | 139 | $14,075 |
| 11 | 39 | 83 | Lake Speed | Speed Racing | Oldsmobile | 187 | 0 | running | 130 | $8,537 |
| 12 | 6 | 20 | Rob Moroso (R) | Moroso Racing | Oldsmobile | 187 | 1 | running | 132 | $7,950 |
| 13 | 15 | 17 | Jimmy Horton | Hendrick Motorsports | Chevrolet | 187 | 0 | running | 124 | $15,980 |
| 14 | 41 | 12 | Hut Stricklin | Bobby Allison Motorsports | Buick | 187 | 0 | running | 121 | $8,710 |
| 15 | 7 | 33 | Harry Gant | Leo Jackson Motorsports | Oldsmobile | 187 | 1 | running | 123 | $14,185 |
| 16 | 24 | 25 | Ken Schrader | Hendrick Motorsports | Chevrolet | 186 | 0 | accident | 115 | $13,500 |
| 17 | 13 | 11 | Geoff Bodine | Junior Johnson & Associates | Ford | 186 | 3 | running | 117 | $14,735 |
| 18 | 38 | 18 | Greg Sacks | Hendrick Motorsports | Chevrolet | 186 | 0 | running | 109 | $6,230 |
| 19 | 33 | 19 | Chad Little | Little Racing | Ford | 186 | 0 | running | 106 | $6,050 |
| 20 | 2 | 28 | Davey Allison | Robert Yates Racing | Ford | 186 | 4 | running | 108 | $15,075 |
| 21 | 32 | 30 | Michael Waltrip | Bahari Racing | Pontiac | 186 | 1 | running | 105 | $9,480 |
| 22 | 30 | 01 | Mickey Gibbs | Gibbs Racing | Ford | 186 | 0 | running | 97 | $5,550 |
| 23 | 27 | 47 | Jack Pennington (R) | Close Racing | Oldsmobile | 186 | 0 | running | 94 | $5,695 |
| 24 | 31 | 57 | Jimmy Spencer | Osterlund Racing | Pontiac | 186 | 0 | running | 91 | $8,790 |
| 25 | 28 | 35 | Bill Venturini | Venturini Motorsports | Chevrolet | 185 | 0 | running | 88 | $5,135 |
| 26 | 10 | 15 | Morgan Shepherd | Bud Moore Engineering | Ford | 185 | 0 | running | 85 | $8,235 |
| 27 | 29 | 14 | A. J. Foyt | A. J. Foyt Racing | Oldsmobile | 185 | 4 | running | 87 | $4,865 |
| 28 | 35 | 71 | Dave Marcis | Marcis Auto Racing | Chevrolet | 183 | 0 | running | 79 | $7,895 |
| 29 | 42 | 43 | Richard Petty | Petty Enterprises | Pontiac | 183 | 0 | running | 76 | $5,725 |
| 30 | 23 | 52 | Jimmy Means | Jimmy Means Racing | Pontiac | 180 | 0 | out of gas | 73 | $5,605 |
| 31 | 40 | 82 | Mark Stahl | Stahl Racing | Ford | 178 | 0 | running | 70 | $4,585 |
| 32 | 26 | 27 | Rusty Wallace | Blue Max Racing | Pontiac | 149 | 1 | engine | 72 | $15,465 |
| 33 | 18 | 26 | Brett Bodine | King Racing | Buick | 148 | 0 | engine | 64 | $7,295 |
| 34 | 19 | 98 | Butch Miller | Travis Carter Enterprises | Chevrolet | 144 | 1 | engine | 66 | $5,150 |
| 35 | 37 | 75 | Rick Wilson | RahMoc Enterprises | Oldsmobile | 133 | 0 | engine | 58 | $7,055 |
| 36 | 20 | 66 | Dick Trickle | Cale Yarborough Motorsports | Pontiac | 132 | 0 | running | 55 | $7,985 |
| 37 | 12 | 68 | Stanley Smith | TriStar Motorsports | Pontiac | 54 | 0 | pit accident | 52 | $4,285 |
| 38 | 34 | 72 | Tracy Leslie | Parker Racing | Oldsmobile | 54 | 0 | pit accident | 49 | $4,990 |
| 39 | 22 | 21 | Dale Jarrett | Wood Brothers Racing | Ford | 51 | 0 | engine | 46 | $7,005 |
| 40 | 36 | 90 | Buddy Baker | Donlavey Racing | Ford | 47 | 0 | ignition | 43 | $4,150 |
| 41 | 8 | 29 | Phil Parsons | Diamond Ridge Motorsports | Pontiac | 25 | 0 | accident | 40 | $4,150 |
| 42 | 11 | 1 | Terry Labonte | Precision Products Racing | Oldsmobile | 6 | 0 | engine | 37 | $6,775 |
Official race results

== Standings after the race ==
Drivers' Championship standings

| | Pos | Driver | Points |
|---|---|---|---|
| | 1 | Mark Martin | 2,509 |
| | 2 | Dale Earnhardt | 2,508 (-1) |
| 1 | 3 | Geoff Bodine | 2,374 (-135) |
| 1 | 4 | Rusty Wallace | 2,338 (–171) |
| 1 | 5 | Kyle Petty | 2,219 (–290) |
| 1 | 6 | Morgan Shepherd | 2,198 (–311) |
| 1 | 7 | Bill Elliott | 2,180 (–329) |
| 1 | 8 | Ken Schrader | 2,180 (–329) |
| | 9 | Ernie Irvan | 2,095 (–414) |
| | 10 | Ricky Rudd | 2,075 (–434) |
Official driver's standings

- Note: Only the first 10 positions are included for the driver standings.

| Previous race: 1990 AC Spark Plug 500 | NASCAR Winston Cup Series; 1990 season | Next race: 1990 Budweiser at The Glen |
