= William Freeman =

William Freeman may refer to:

- William Freeman (martyr) (1558–1595), English Roman Catholic priest and martyr
- William Freeman (politician) (died c. 1801), land surveyor and politician in Nova Scotia
- William Henry Freeman (1844–1911), American Civil War soldier
- William T. Freeman (born 1957), American computer scientist
- Bill Freeman (author) (born 1938), Canadian author
- Bill Freeman (racing driver)

== See also ==
- William Peere Williams-Freeman (1742–1832), Royal Navy officer
