= 1978 12 Hours of Sebring =

Sports car endurance race

The Twelve Hours of Sebring International Grand Prix of Endurance for the Camel GT Challenge was the second round of the 1978 IMSA GT Championship. The race was held at the Sebring International Raceway on March 18, 1978. The overall victory went to No. 9, Dick Barbour Racing (Porsche 935). The drivers were Brian Redman, Charles Mendez and Bob Garretson.

== Race results ==
Class winners in bold.

Pos	Class	No	Team	Drivers	Car	Laps
1	**GTX**	**9**	**(United States) Dick Barbour Racing**	**(United Kingdom) Brian Redman (United States) Charles Mendez (United States) Bob Garretson**	**Porsche 935**	**240**
2	GTX	95	(United States) Bob Hagestad	(United States) Bob Hagestad (United States) Hurley Haywood	Porsche 935	240
3	GTX	13	(United States) Ore House - Vail	(United States) Hal Shaw Jr. (United States) Tom Spalding	Porsche 935	239
4	**GTO**	**33**	**(United States) JLP Racing**	**(United States) John Paul (Puerto Rico) Bonky Fernandez**	**Porsche 911 Carrera RSR**	**233**
5	GTX	32	(United States) Earle & Akin Racing	(United States) Steve Earle (United States) Bob Akin (United States) Rick Knoop	Porsche 911 Carrera RSR	225
6	**GTU**	**77**	**(United States) Bill Scott Racing**	**(Venezuela) Francisco Romero (Venezuela) Ernesto Soto**	**Porsche 911S**	**219**
7	GTU	42	(Puerto Rico) El Sol Racing	(Puerto Rico) Chiqui Soldevilla (Puerto Rico) Luis Gordillo	Porsche 911S	213
8 DNF	GTO	25	(United States) KWM Racing	(United States) Kenper Miller (United States) Walt Bohren	BMW 3.5 CSL	211
9	**AC**	**96**	**(United States) Unicure**	**(United States) Gene Felton (United States) Vince Gimondo**	**Buick Skylark**	**209**
10	GTU	62	(United States) William J. Koll	(United States) Bill Koll (United States) David Hamren (United States) Dennis Sherman	Porsche 914-6 GT	209
11	GTO	03	(United States) Cliff Gottlob	(United States) Cliff Gottlob (United States) Danny Terrill	Chevrolet Corvette	199
12	GTU	99	(United States) Bob Bondurant	(United States) Steve Cook (United States) Bill Cooper (United States) Ron Southern	Datsun 260Z	198
13 DNF	GTO	58	(Puerto Rico) Diego Febles Racing	(Puerto Rico) Diego Febles (Republic of Ireland) Alec Poole	Porsche 911 Carrera RSR	197
14	GTO	57	(United States) Sebring Racing	(United States) Terry Keller (United States) Bob Gray (United States) Nort Northam	Chevrolet Corvette	197
15	GTU	36	(United States) Case Racing	(United States) Ron Case (United States) Dave Panaccione (United States) Jack Rynerson	Porsche 911	196
16	GTU	50	(Canada) Fritz Hochreuter	(Canada) Fritz Hochreuter (Canada) Rudy Bartling (Canada) Rainer Brezinka	Porsche 911S	189
17	GTO	48	(United States) Autodyne	(United States) Luis Sereix (United States) Lyn St. James (United States) Phil Currin	Chevrolet Corvette	186
18	GTU	01	(United States) Roehrig Racing	(United States) Dave White (United States) J. Dana Roehrig (United States) Gary Mesnick	Porsche 911S	185
19	AC	92	(United States) Road Atlanta	(United States) Dave Sloyer (United States) Jim Fitzgerald	Plymouth Volare	184
20	GTO	79	(United States) Rennsport Porsche Works	(United States) Michael Callas (United States) Peter Papke (United States) Jim Cook	Porsche 911 Carrera RSR	182
21	GTU	89	(United States) Barrick Motor Racing	(United States) Rusty Bond (United States) Ren Tilton	Porsche 911	181
22	GTX	05	(United States) Saltwater Band	(United States) Stephen Bond (United States) Philip Dann	Chevrolet Monza	181
23	GTU	85	(United States) John Hulen	(United States) John Hulen (United States) Ron Coupland (United States) Nick Engels	Porsche 914-6 GT	174
24	GTX	93	(United States) Whittington Bros.	(United States) Don Whittington (United States) Russ Boy	Porsche 934/5	172
25	GTU	70	(United States) Race Car Ent.	(United States) M. L. Speer (United States) Windle Turley	Porsche 911S	168
26	GTU	71	(United States) Foreign Exchange Racing	(United States) John Higgins (United States) Tim Cooper (United States) James King	Porsche 911	168
27	GTU	88	(United States) Hamilton House Racing	(United States) Joseph Hamilton (United States) Chuck Wade (United States) Ron Collins	Porsche 911S	167
28 DNF	GTO	07	(United States) Morrison's Inc.	(United States) Dave Cowart (United States) Nick Craw (Italy) Joe Castellano	Porsche 911 Carrera RSR	165
29 DNF	GTU	00	(United States) Red Roof Inns	(United States) Steve Southard (United States) Jim Trueman	Porsche 914-6 GT	164
30	GTU	52	(United States) Native Tan	(United States) Charles Kleinschmidt (United States) Lee Culpepper (United States) William Koch	MGB GT	160
31	GTU	21	(United States) DiLella Racing	(United States) Vince DiLella (United States) Manuel Cueto	Porsche 914	152
32 DNF	GTU	51	(United States) Wynn's International	(United States) John Hotchkis (United States) Robert Kirby (United States) Dennis Aase	Porsche 911S	142
33 DNF	GTO	14	(United States) Robert LaMay	(United States) Robert LaMay (United States) Richard Valentine (United States) Larry Parker	Ford Mustang	140
34	GTO	91	(United States) Framm Promotions / W. Frank	(United States) Werner Frank (United States) Roger Schramm	Porsche 911 Carrera RSR	140
35 DNF	GTU	08	(United States) Terry Wolters	(United States) Terry Wolters (United States) Wayne Miller	Porsche 911 Carrera RSR	129
36	GTU	35	(Germany) Team Beilcke	(Germany) Bruno Beilcke (United States) Sepp Grinbold (United States) Alf Gebhardt	BMW 2002	123
37	GTO	12	(United States) George Garcia	(United States) George Garcia (United States) Daniel Vilarchao	Chevrolet Corvette	122
38 DNF	GTX	2	(United States) McLaren North America	(United Kingdom) David Hobbs (United States) Milt Minter (United States) Tom Klausler	BMW 320i Turbo	119
39	GTU	61	(United States) Faza Squadra	(United States) Al Cosentino (United States) Jim Downing	Mazda RX-3	116
40 DNF	GTX	09	(United States) Belcher Racing	(United States) Gary Belcher (United States) Doc Bundy	Porsche 934/5	115
41	GTX	38	(United States) Meldeau Tire Co.	(United States) Mike Meldeau (United States) Bill McDill	Chevrolet Camaro	113
42	GTX	17	(United States) Kenneth LaGrow	(United States) Kenneth LaGrow (United States) Jimmy Tumbleston	Chevrolet Camaro	112
43	GTU	02	(United States) H. David Redszus	(United States) H. David Redszus (United States) Merv Rosen	BMW 2002	111
44 DNF	GTU	34	(United States) Drolsom Racing Inc.	(United States) George Drolsom (United States) Hugh Davenport	Porsche 911S	98
45 DNF	GTU	84	(United States) Worldparts	(United States) Bob Speakman (United States) John Maffucci	Datsun 260Z	98
46 DNF	AC	47	(United States) Tim Chitwood	(United States) Tim Chitwood (United States) Sam Fillingham (United States) K. P. Jones	Chevrolet Nova	90
47 DNF	GTO	87	(United States) Pedro Vazquez	(United States) Pedro Vazqez (United States) Ron Oyler	Porsche 911S	83
48 DNF	GTX	06	(United States) R. V. Shulnburg Scrap Metal	(United States) R. V. Shulnburg (United States) Dave Heinz (United States) Michael Keyser	Chevrolet Corvette	83
49	GTX	28	(United States) Desperado Racing	(United States) Clif Kearns (United States) Marty Hinze (United States) Stephen Behr	Porsche 935	79
50 DNF	GTX	24	(United States) Executive Industries	(United States) Tom Frank (United States) Bob Bergstrom	Porsche 911 Carrera RSR	77
51 DNF	GTO	46	(Colombia) Mauricio de Narváez	(Colombia) Mauricio de Narváez (United States) Albert Naon	Porsche 911 Carrera RSR	76
52 DNF	GTU	27	(United States) Miami Auto Racing	(United States) Ray Mummery (United States) Jack Refenning (United States) Tom Sheehy	Porsche 911S	70
53 DNF	AC	0	(United States) Chesrown Olds	(United States) Gene Rutherford (United States) Tom Wallace (United States) Kathy Wallace	Oldsmobile Cutlass	66
54 DNF	GTX	3	(United States) Bill Freeman Racing	(United States) Bill Freeman (United States) Bob Harmon (United States) Byron Leydecker	Porsche 911 Carrera RSR	62
55 DNF	GTX	73	(United States) Howey Farms	(United States) Clark Howey (United States) Dale Koch	Chevrolet Camaro	50
56 DNF	GTO	4	(United States) B. R. Racing Team	(United States) Mark Leuzinger (United States) Mike Van der Werff	De Tomaso Pantera	48
57 DNF	GTX	6	(United States) Dick Barbour Performance	(United States) Dick Barbour (Germany) Rolf Stommelen (Liechtenstein) Manfred Schurti	Porsche 935-77A	47
58 DNF	GTX	11	(United States) Javier Garcia	(United States) Javier Garcia	Chevrolet Corvette	46
59 DNF	GTX	41	(United States) Jones Ind. Racing	(United States) Herb Jones Jr. (United States) Steve Faul	Chevrolet Camaro	45
60 DNF	GTU	76	(United States) Quality Inn	(United States) Frank Thomas (United States) Lee Mueller (United States) Paul May	Porsche 911	43
61 DNF	GTU	19	(United States) Hallet Motor Racing Circuit	(United States) Anatoly Arutnoff (United States) Brian Goellnicht (United States) Jose Marina	Lancia Stratos HF	34
62 DNF	GTX	8	(United States) Robert Beasley	(United States) Bob Beasley (United States) Bruce Jennings	Porsche 911 Carrera RSR	30
63 DNF	GTU	45	(United States) Vann's Auto Body	(United States) Gary Steele (United States) Jim Gaeta (United States) Bob Zulkowski	Porsche 911	28
64 DNF	GTO	20	(United States) Bostyan Racing	(United States) Richard Bostyan (United States) Jerry Thompson (United States) Don Yenko	Chevrolet Corvette	26
65 DNF	GTO	30	(Puerto Rico) Aro-Mandy Racing	(Puerto Rico) Mandy Gonzalez (United States) Hiram Cruz (Puerto Rico) Manuel Villa	BMW 3.0 CSL	25
66 DNF	AC	80	(United States) Herb Adams	(United States) Herb Adams (United States) Pat Bedard (United States) Marv Thomson	Oldsmobile Cutlass	21
67 DNF	GTX	86	(United States) Team Pantera	(United States) Hugh Kleinpeter (United States) Jef Stevens	De Tomaso Pantera	17
68 DNF	GTO	04	(United States) Rick Thompkins	(United States) Rick Thompkins (United States) Randy Blessing	Chevrolet Corvette	15
69 DNF	GTX	59	(United States) Brumos Porsche	(United States) Peter Gregg (United States) Brad Frisselle	Porsche 935	11
70 DNF	GTO	23	(United States) Overbagh Motor Racing	(United States) Hoyt Overbagh (United States) Billy Hagan (United States) Bud Wamsley	Chevrolet Monza	8
71 DNF	GTU	78	(United States) Abingdon/Ashley Motors	(Canada) Rod Bremner (Canada) Don McKnight	Triumph TR7	7
72 DNF	GTU	49	(United States) Ted Schumacher Racing	(United States) Ted Schumacher (United States) Robert Hubbard (United States) John Kelly	Triumph GT6	7
73 DNF	GTX	7	(Canada) Heimrath Racing	(Canada) Ludwig Heimrath Sr. (Canada) Norm Ridgley	Porsche 935	6
74 DNF	GTX	40	(United States) Quintana Racing	(United States) Manuel Quintana (United States) Richard Stone	Ford Mustang	5
75 DNF	GTX	1	(United States) Dale Kreider Racing	(United States) Dale Kreider (United States) Jack Baldwin	Chevrolet Corvette	4
76 DNF	GTX	54	(United States) Raul Garcia	(Dominican Republic) Joaquin Lopez (United States) Raul Garcia	Chevrolet Camaro	2

=== Class Winners ===
Class	Winners	
GTX	Redman / Mendez / Garretson	Porsche 935
GTO	Paul / Fernandez	Porsche 911 Carrera RSR
GTU	Romero / Soto	Porsche 911
AC	Felton / Gimondo	Buick Skylark
