= KASN (disambiguation) =

KASN may refer to:

- Talladega Municipal Airport, Alabama (ICAO code KASN)
- KASN (TV), a television station serving the Pine Bluff–Little Rock, Arkansas, area
