= 1990 AC Spark Plug 500 =

16th race of the 1990 NASCAR Winston Cup Series

Race details
- Race 16 of 29 in the 1990 NASCAR Winston Cup Series
- The 1990 AC Spark Plug 500 program cover, featuring Rusty Wallace.
- Date: July 22, 1990
- Official name: 18th Annual AC Spark Plug 500
- Location: Long Pond, Pennsylvania, Pocono Raceway
- Course: Permanent racing facility
- Course length: 2.5 miles (4.0 km)
- Distance: 200 laps, 500 mi (804.672 km)
- Scheduled distance: 200 laps, 500 mi (804.672 km)
- Average speed: 124.07 miles per hour (199.67 km/h)
- Attendance: 90,000

Pole position
Driver	Mark Martin	Roush Racing
- Time: 56.867

Most laps led
Driver	Geoff Bodine	Junior Johnson & Associates
- Laps: 119

Winner
No. 11	Geoff Bodine	Junior Johnson & Associates

Television in the United States
- Network: ESPN
- Announcers: Bob Jenkins, Benny Parsons, Ned Jarrett

Radio in the United States
- Radio: Motor Racing Network

The 1990 AC Spark Plug 500 was the 16th stock car race of the 1990 NASCAR Winston Cup Series season and the 18th iteration of the event. The race was held on Sunday, July 22, 1990, before an audience of 90,000 in Long Pond, Pennsylvania, at Pocono Raceway, a 2.5 miles (4.0 km) triangular permanent course. The race took the scheduled 200 laps to complete. Depending on fuel mileage, Junior Johnson & Associates driver Geoff Bodine would manage to coast his car for the final 43 laps of the race to take his ninth career NASCAR Winston Cup Series victory and his second victory of the season. To fill out the top three, Melling Racing driver Bill Elliott and Blue Max Racing driver Rusty Wallace would finish second and third, respectively.

== Background ==
The layout of Pocono International Raceway, the venue where the race was held.

The race was held at Pocono International Raceway, which is a three-turn superspeedway located in Long Pond, Pennsylvania. The track hosts two annual NASCAR Sprint Cup Series races, as well as one Xfinity Series and Camping World Truck Series event. Until 2019, the track also hosted an IndyCar Series race.

Pocono International Raceway is one of a very few NASCAR tracks not owned by either Speedway Motorsports, Inc. or International Speedway Corporation. It is operated by the Igdalsky siblings Brandon, Nicholas, and sister Ashley, and cousins Joseph IV and Chase Mattioli, all of whom are third-generation members of the family-owned Mattco Inc, started by Joseph II and Rose Mattioli.

Outside of the NASCAR races, the track is used throughout the year by the Sports Car Club of America (SCCA) and motorcycle clubs as well as racing schools and an IndyCar race. The triangular oval also has three separate infield sections of racetrack – North Course, East Course and South Course. Each of these infield sections use a separate portion of the tri-oval to complete the track. During regular non-race weekends, multiple clubs can use the track by running on different infield sections. Also some of the infield sections can be run in either direction, or multiple infield sections can be put together – such as running the North Course and the South Course and using the tri-oval to connect the two.

=== Entry list ===
- (R) denotes rookie driver.

#	Driver	Team	Make
1	Terry Labonte	Precision Products Racing	Oldsmobile
2	Troy Beebe	U.S. Racing	Pontiac
3	Dale Earnhardt	Richard Childress Racing	Chevrolet
4	Ernie Irvan	Morgan–McClure Motorsports	Oldsmobile
5	Ricky Rudd	Hendrick Motorsports	Chevrolet
6	Mark Martin	Roush Racing	Ford
7	Alan Kulwicki	AK Racing	Ford
8	Bobby Hillin Jr.	Stavola Brothers Racing	Buick
9	Bill Elliott	Melling Racing	Ford
10	Derrike Cope	Whitcomb Racing	Chevrolet
11	Geoff Bodine	Junior Johnson & Associates	Ford
12	Hut Stricklin	Bobby Allison Motorsports	Buick
13	Randy LaJoie	Linro Motorsports	Buick
15	Morgan Shepherd	Bud Moore Engineering	Ford
17	Darrell Waltrip	Hendrick Motorsports	Chevrolet
18	Greg Sacks	Hendrick Motorsports	Chevrolet
20	Rob Moroso (R)	Moroso Racing	Oldsmobile
21	Dale Jarrett	Wood Brothers Racing	Ford
22	Rick Mast	U.S. Racing	Pontiac
25	Ken Schrader	Hendrick Motorsports	Chevrolet
26	Brett Bodine	King Racing	Buick
27	Rusty Wallace	Blue Max Racing	Pontiac
28	Davey Allison	Robert Yates Racing	Ford
30	Michael Waltrip	Bahari Racing	Pontiac
33	Harry Gant	Leo Jackson Motorsports	Oldsmobile
38	Dick Johnson	Dick Johnson Racing	Ford
42	Kyle Petty	SABCO Racing	Pontiac
43	Richard Petty	Petty Enterprises	Pontiac
50	Rich Vogler*	RaDiUs Motorsports	Chevrolet
52	Jimmy Means	Jimmy Means Racing	Pontiac
53	Jerry O'Neil (R)	Aroneck Racing	Oldsmobile
54	Tommy Riggins	Hakes–Welliver Racing	Oldsmobile
57	Jimmy Spencer	Osterlund Racing	Pontiac
58	Brian Ross	Ken Schrader Racing	Pontiac
66	Dick Trickle	Cale Yarborough Motorsports	Pontiac
70	J. D. McDuffie	McDuffie Racing	Pontiac
71	Dave Marcis	Marcis Auto Racing	Chevrolet
74	Mike Potter	Wawak Racing	Pontiac
75	Rick Wilson	RahMoc Enterprises	Pontiac
77	Ken Ragan	Ragan Racing	Ford
85	Bobby Gerhart	Bobby Gerhart Racing	Chevrolet
94	Sterling Marlin	Hagan Racing	Oldsmobile
98	Butch Miller	Travis Carter Enterprises	Chevrolet

*Withdrew due to Vogler dying the day before the race in a USAC event.

== Qualifying ==
Qualifying was split into two rounds. The first round was held on Friday, July 20, at 3:00 PM EST. Each driver would have one lap to set a time. During the first round, the top 15 drivers in the round would be guaranteed a starting spot in the race. If a driver was not able to guarantee a spot in the first round, they had the option to scrub their time from the first round and try and run a faster lap time in a second round qualifying run, held on Saturday, July 21, at 10:30 AM EST. As with the first round, each driver would have one lap to set a time. For this specific race, positions 16-40 would be decided on time, and depending on who needed it, a select amount of positions were given to cars who had not otherwise qualified but were high enough in owner's points; up to two provisionals were given.

Mark Martin, driving for Roush Racing, would win the pole, setting a time of 56.867 and an average speed of 158.264 miles per hour (254.701 km/h) in the first round.

Three drivers would fail to qualify.

=== Full qualifying results ===
Pos.	#	Driver	Team	Make	Time	Speed
1	6	Mark Martin	Roush Racing	Ford	56.867	158.264
2	25	Ken Schrader	Hendrick Motorsports	Chevrolet	57.245	157.219
3	18	Greg Sacks	Hendrick Motorsports	Chevrolet	57.282	157.117
4	11	Geoff Bodine	Junior Johnson & Associates	Ford	57.490	156.549
5	33	Harry Gant	Leo Jackson Motorsports	Oldsmobile	57.531	156.437
6	9	Bill Elliott	Melling Racing	Ford	57.545	156.399
7	20	Rob Moroso (R)	Moroso Racing	Oldsmobile	57.566	156.342
8	27	Rusty Wallace	Blue Max Racing	Pontiac	57.614	156.212
9	7	Alan Kulwicki	AK Racing	Ford	57.629	156.171
10	4	Ernie Irvan	Morgan–McClure Motorsports	Oldsmobile	57.645	156.128
11	3	Dale Earnhardt	Richard Childress Racing	Chevrolet	57.650	156.114
12	10	Derrike Cope	Whitcomb Racing	Chevrolet	57.729	155.901
13	5	Ricky Rudd	Hendrick Motorsports	Chevrolet	57.751	155.841
14	42	Kyle Petty	SABCO Racing	Pontiac	57.757	155.825
15	28	Davey Allison	Robert Yates Racing	Ford	57.759	155.820
Failed to lock in Round 1
16	94	Sterling Marlin	Hagan Racing	Oldsmobile	57.785	155.750
17	8	Bobby Hillin Jr.	Stavola Brothers Racing	Buick	57.817	155.664
18	21	Dale Jarrett	Wood Brothers Racing	Ford	57.837	155.610
19	75	Rick Wilson	RahMoc Enterprises	Oldsmobile	57.848	155.580
20	12	Hut Stricklin	Bobby Allison Motorsports	Buick	57.883	155.486
21	26	Brett Bodine	King Racing	Buick	57.896	155.451
22	1	Terry Labonte	Precision Products Racing	Oldsmobile	57.926	155.371
23	66	Dick Trickle	Cale Yarborough Motorsports	Pontiac	57.936	155.344
24	43	Richard Petty	Petty Enterprises	Pontiac	57.954	155.296
25	17	Darrell Waltrip	Hendrick Motorsports	Chevrolet	57.968	155.259
26	98	Butch Miller	Travis Carter Enterprises	Chevrolet	58.030	155.092
27	15	Morgan Shepherd	Bud Moore Engineering	Ford	58.078	154.964
28	30	Michael Waltrip	Bahari Racing	Pontiac	58.184	154.682
29	57	Jimmy Spencer	Osterlund Racing	Pontiac	58.197	154.647
30	22	Rick Mast	U.S. Racing	Pontiac	58.371	154.186
31	53	Jerry O'Neil (R)	Aroneck Racing	Oldsmobile	58.426	154.041
32	50	Rich Vogler	RaDiUs Motorsports	Chevrolet	58.528	153.773
33	38	Dick Johnson	Dick Johnson Racing	Ford	58.587	153.618
34	54	Tommy Riggins	Hakes–Welliver Racing	Oldsmobile	58.658	153.432
35	71	Dave Marcis	Marcis Auto Racing	Chevrolet	58.754	153.181
36	58	Brian Ross	Ken Schrader Racing	Pontiac	58.893	152.820
37	77	Ken Ragan	Ragan Racing	Ford	58.948	152.677
38	52	Jimmy Means	Jimmy Means Racing	Pontiac	59.041	152.436
39	13	Randy LaJoie	Linro Motorsports	Buick	59.392	151.536
40	74	Mike Potter	Wawak Racing	Pontiac	1:00.025	149.938
Failed to qualify
41	70	J. D. McDuffie	McDuffie Racing	Pontiac	-*	-*
42	85	Bobby Gerhart	Bobby Gerhart Racing	Chevrolet	-*	-*
43	2	Troy Beebe	U.S. Racing	Pontiac	-*	-*
Official first round qualifying results
Official starting lineup

== Race results ==
Fin	St	#	Driver	Team	Make	Laps	Led	Status	Pts	Winnings
1	4	11	Geoff Bodine	Junior Johnson & Associates	Ford	200	119	running	185	$58,500
2	6	9	Bill Elliott	Melling Racing	Ford	200	0	running	170	$33,650
3	8	27	Rusty Wallace	Blue Max Racing	Pontiac	200	7	running	170	$30,000
4	11	3	Dale Earnhardt	Richard Childress Racing	Chevrolet	200	6	running	165	$22,800
5	15	28	Davey Allison	Robert Yates Racing	Ford	200	24	running	160	$25,950
6	1	6	Mark Martin	Roush Racing	Ford	200	0	running	150	$21,050
7	13	5	Ricky Rudd	Hendrick Motorsports	Chevrolet	200	0	running	146	$12,650
8	26	98	Butch Miller	Travis Carter Enterprises	Chevrolet	200	0	running	142	$10,582
9	24	43	Richard Petty	Petty Enterprises	Pontiac	200	0	running	138	$8,675
10	22	1	Terry Labonte	Precision Products Racing	Oldsmobile	200	0	running	134	$12,450
11	2	25	Ken Schrader	Hendrick Motorsports	Chevrolet	200	3	running	135	$12,750
12	17	8	Bobby Hillin Jr.	Stavola Brothers Racing	Buick	200	0	running	127	$9,550
13	12	10	Derrike Cope	Whitcomb Racing	Chevrolet	200	4	running	129	$11,350
14	5	33	Harry Gant	Leo Jackson Motorsports	Oldsmobile	200	0	running	121	$12,150
15	23	66	Dick Trickle	Cale Yarborough Motorsports	Pontiac	199	0	running	118	$10,325
16	21	26	Brett Bodine	King Racing	Buick	199	0	running	115	$8,650
17	9	7	Alan Kulwicki	AK Racing	Ford	199	0	running	112	$8,350
18	18	21	Dale Jarrett	Wood Brothers Racing	Ford	198	0	running	109	$7,950
19	29	57	Jimmy Spencer	Osterlund Racing	Pontiac	197	1	running	111	$7,625
20	25	17	Darrell Waltrip	Hendrick Motorsports	Chevrolet	197	0	running	103	$14,175
21	38	52	Jimmy Means	Jimmy Means Racing	Pontiac	197	0	running	100	$4,175
22	30	22	Rick Mast	U.S. Racing	Pontiac	196	0	running	97	$4,075
23	28	30	Michael Waltrip	Bahari Racing	Pontiac	193	0	running	94	$6,975
24	37	77	Ken Ragan	Ragan Racing	Ford	190	0	accident	91	$3,925
25	40	74	Mike Potter	Wawak Racing	Pontiac	189	0	running	88	$3,975
26	10	4	Ernie Irvan	Morgan–McClure Motorsports	Oldsmobile	181	0	running	85	$6,775
27	36	58	Brian Ross	Ken Schrader Racing	Pontiac	175	0	engine	82	$3,775
28	35	71	Dave Marcis	Marcis Auto Racing	Chevrolet	172	0	running	79	$6,575
29	20	12	Hut Stricklin	Bobby Allison Motorsports	Buick	167	0	engine	76	$4,425
30	16	94	Sterling Marlin	Hagan Racing	Oldsmobile	155	0	accident	73	$6,825
31	19	75	Rick Wilson	RahMoc Enterprises	Oldsmobile	154	0	accident	70	$6,250
32	7	20	Rob Moroso (R)	Moroso Racing	Oldsmobile	138	0	accident	67	$4,825
33	3	18	Greg Sacks	Hendrick Motorsports	Chevrolet	137	33	accident	69	$14,950
34	31	53	Jerry O'Neil (R)	Aroneck Racing	Oldsmobile	134	0	accident	61	$3,650
35	14	42	Kyle Petty	SABCO Racing	Pontiac	131	3	oil pan	63	$10,350
36	27	15	Morgan Shepherd	Bud Moore Engineering	Ford	121	0	accident	55	$5,925
37	34	54	Tommy Riggins	Hakes–Welliver Racing	Oldsmobile	120	0	accident	52	$3,250
38	39	13	Randy LaJoie	Linro Motorsports	Buick	10	0	engine	49	$3,225
39	33	38	Dick Johnson	Dick Johnson Racing	Ford	4	0	accident	46	$3,200
40	32	50	Rich Vogler	RaDiUs Motorsports	Chevrolet	0	0	did not start	0	$0
Official race results

== Standings after the race ==
Drivers' Championship standings

	Pos	Driver	Points
	1	Mark Martin	2,371
	2	Dale Earnhardt	2,323 (-48)
	3	Rusty Wallace	2,266 (-105)
	4	Geoff Bodine	2,257 (–114)
	5	Morgan Shepherd	2,113 (–258)
	6	Kyle Petty	2,072 (–299)
	7	Ken Schrader	2,065 (–306)
1	8	Bill Elliott	2,005 (–366)
1	9	Ernie Irvan	1,945 (–426)
1	10	Ricky Rudd	1,920 (–451)
Official driver's standings

- Note: Only the first 10 positions are included for the driver standings.

Previous race: 1990 Pepsi 400	NASCAR Winston Cup Series; 1990 season	Next race: 1990 DieHard 500
