= 1978 IMSA GT Championship =

8th season of the racing series organized by IMSA

Seasons
- ← 1977 1979 →

The 1978 Camel GT Challenge season was the 8th season of the IMSA GT Championship auto racing series. It was the first year of the new GTX class, which allowed for Group 5 cars to compete. The GTO and GTU class Grand tourer cars remained from before. It began February 4, 1978, and ended November 26, 1978, after fourteen rounds.

== Schedule ==
Not all classes participated in some events. Races marked with All had all classes on track at the same time.

| Rnd | Race | Length | Class | Circuit | Date |
|---|---|---|---|---|---|
| 1 | 24 Hours of Daytona | 24 Hours | All | Daytona International Speedway | February 4 February 5 |
| 2 | 12 Hours of Sebring | 12 Hours | All | Sebring International Raceway | March 18 |
| 3 | 6 Hours of Talladega | 6 Hours | All | Talladega Superspeedway | April 2 |
| 4 | Camel GT Challenge | 75 mi (121 km) | GTU | Road Atlanta | April 16 |
| 4 | Camel GT Challenge | 100 mi (160 km) | GTX/GTO | Road Atlanta | April 16 |
| 5 | Monterey Triple Crown | 100 mi (160 km) | GTX/GTO | Laguna Seca Raceway | April 30 |
| 5 | Monterey Triple Crown | 45 Minutes | GTU | Laguna Seca Raceway | April 30 |
| 6 | Hallett Grand Prix | 1 Hour | GTU | Hallett Motor Racing Circuit | May 7 |
| 6 | Hallett Grand Prix | 100 mi (160 km) | GTX/GTO | Hallett Motor Racing Circuit | May 7 |
| 7 | Coca-Cola 300 | 100 mi (160 km) | GTX/GTO | Lime Rock Park | May 29 |
| 7 | Coca-Cola 300 | 100 mi (160 km) | GTU | Lime Rock Park | May 29 |
| 8 | Pepsi Grand Prix | 100 mi (160 km) | All | Brainerd International Raceway | June 18 |
| 9 | Paul Revere 250 | 250 mi (400 km) | All | Daytona International Speedway | July 4 |
| 10 | Sears Point Grand Prix | 100 mi (160 km) | GTX/GTO | Sears Point International Raceway | July 30 |
| 10 | Sears Point Grand Prix | 75 mi (121 km) | GTU | Sears Point International Raceway | July 30 |
| 11 | G.I. Joe's Grand Prix | 100 mi (160 km) | GTX/GTO | Portland International Raceway | August 6 |
| 11 | G.I. Joe's Grand Prix | 45 Minutes | GTU | Portland International Raceway | August 6 |
| 12 | Camel GT Mid-Ohio 250 | 250 mi (400 km) | All | Mid-Ohio Sports Car Course | August 27 |
| 13 | Arthur Montgomery 100 | 75 mi (121 km) | GTU | Road Atlanta | September 4 |
| 13 | Arthur Montgomery 100 | 100 mi (160 km) | GTX/GTO | Road Atlanta | September 4 |
| 14 | Camel GT Daytona 250 | 250 mi (400 km) | All | Daytona International Speedway | November 26 |

== Season results ==
| Rnd | Circuit | GTX Winning Team | GTO Winning Team | GTU Winning Team | Results |
| Rnd | Circuit | GTX Winning Driver(s) | GTO Winning Driver(s) | GTU Winning Driver(s) | Results |
|---|---|---|---|---|---|
| 1 | Daytona | #99 Brumos Porsche | #58 Diego Febles Racing | #01 J. Dana Roehrig | Results |
| 1 | Daytona | (Germany) Rolf Stommelen (Netherlands) Toine Hezemans (United States) Peter Gregg | (Puerto Rico) Diego Febles (Republic of Ireland) Alec Poole | (United States) Dave White (United States) Gary Mesnick (United States) J. Dana Roehrig | Results |
| 2 | Sebring | #9 Dick Barbour Performance | #33 JLP Racing | #77 Bill Scott Racing | Results |
| 2 | Sebring | (United Kingdom) Brian Redman (United States) Charles Mendez (United States) Bob Garretson | (United States) John Paul, Sr. (Puerto Rico) Bonky Fernández | (Venezuela) Francisco Romero (Venezuela) Ernesto Soto | Results |
| 3 | Talladega | #59 Brumos Porsche | #33 Boricua Racing | #76 Quality Inn | Results |
| 3 | Talladega | (United States) Peter Gregg (United States) Brad Frisselle | (Puerto Rico) Bonky Fernández (United States) Dave Cowart | (United States) Lee Mueller (United States) Frank Thomas | Results |
| 4 | Road Atlanta | #59 Brumos Porsche Audi | #25 Deren Automotive | #01 Roehrig Racing | Results |
| 4 | Road Atlanta | (United States) Peter Gregg | (United States) Kenper Miller | (United States) Dave White | Results |
| 5 | Laguna Seca | #16 Vasek Polak | #01 BMW | #48 Datsun | Results |
| 5 | Laguna Seca | (United States) George Follmer | (United States) John Morton | (United States) Frank Leary | Results |
| 6 | Hallett | #2 McLaren North America | #25 BMW | #51 Porsche | Results |
| 6 | Hallett | (United Kingdom) David Hobbs | (United States) Kenper Miller | (United States) Dennis Aase | Results |
| 7 | Lime Rock | #59 Brumos Porsche | #58 Diego Febles Racing | #33 Bob Sharp Racing | Results |
| 7 | Lime Rock | (United States) Peter Gregg | (Puerto Rico) Diego Febles | (United States) Sam Posey | Results |
| 8 | Brainerd | #59 Brumos Porsche | #07 Morrison's Inc. | #01 Porsche | Results |
| 8 | Brainerd | (United States) Peter Gregg | (United States) Dave Cowart | (United States) Dave White | Results |
| 9 | Daytona | #59 Brumos Porsche | #25 BMW | #01 Porsche | Results |
| 9 | Daytona | (United States) Peter Gregg | (United States) Kenper Miller | (United States) Dave White | Results |
| 10 | Sears Point | #2 McLaren North America | #55 Porsche | #48 Datsun | Results |
| 10 | Sears Point | (United Kingdom) David Hobbs | (United States) Howard Meister | (United States) Frank Leary | Results |
| 11 | Portland | #59 Brumos Porsche | #07 Morrison's Inc. | #64 Porsche | Results |
| 11 | Portland | (United States) Peter Gregg | (United States) Dave Cowart | (United States) Dennis Aase | Results |
| 12 | Mid-Ohio | #94 Whittington Brothers Racing | #07 Morrison's Inc. | #42 Porsche | Results |
| 12 | Mid-Ohio | (United States) Bill Whittington (United States) Jim Busby | (United States) Dave Cowart (Colombia) Mauricio de Narvaez | (United States) Bill Bean | Results |
| 13 | Road Atlanta | #59 Brumos Porsche | #55 Andial Porsche-Meister Homes | #83 Sun/Moon Electramotive | Results |
| 13 | Road Atlanta | (United States) Peter Gregg | (United States) Howard Meister | (United States) Don Devendorf | Results |
| 14 | Daytona | #59 Brumos Porsche | #04 Chevrolet | #79 Datsun | Results |
| 14 | Daytona | (United States) Peter Gregg | (United States) Rick Thompkins | (United States) Richard Kendrick (United States) Scott Hoerr | Results |
