= Anniston Air Force Base =

Anniston Air Force Base Anniston Army Air Field
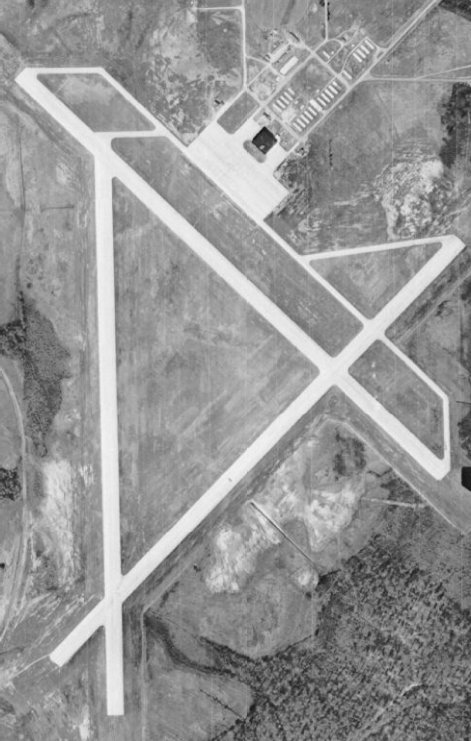
- Archive photo of the former Anniston AFB, 12 February 1949
- IATA: none; ICAO: none

Summary
- Airport type: Military
- Operator: United States Air Force
- Location: Lincoln, Alabama
- Elevation AMSL: 522 ft (159 m)
- Coordinates: 33°34′5″N 86°3′43″W

Map
- Location of Anniston Air Force Base

Runways
Direction	Length		Surface
Direction	ft	m	Surface
18/36	5,300	1,615	Concrete
4/22	5,300	1,615	Concrete
13/31	5,300	1,615	Concrete

Anniston Air Force Base is a former United States Air Force airfield located approximately 10 miles north-northeast of Talladega, Alabama. It was active from 1942 to 1945 and 1949 to 1952. It is currently the site of the Talladega Superspeedway and Talladega Municipal Airport.

== History ==
Anniston was opened on 19 October 1942 as a flying school as part of Army Air Forces Training Command (AAFTC). The field was built with three hard-surfaced concrete runways. The main runway was 5,300 feet long. The base also featured a parking ramp and one hangar, constructed of wood and metal. The ground station consisted of many uniform buildings constructed of wood, tar paper, and non-masonry siding. The use of concrete and steel was limited because of the critical need elsewhere. Most buildings were hot and dusty in the summer and very cold in the winter. Besides offices, barracks and training classrooms, there was a library, a social club for officers, and enlisted men, and a store to buy living necessities.

The airfield was initially assigned as an auxiliary to Courtland Army Airfield, Alabama and was assigned to the Southeast Training Center of the Army Air Force Training Command. It was used as a Basic Flying school, and was equipped with Vultee BT-13 Valiants for the cadets assigned to the base. AAFTC also located a transition school at Anniston in early 1945 for pilot upgrade training from B-17/B-24 heavy bombers to B-29 Superfortress very heavy bombers. The airfield was also used by the Army Airways Communication System with a detachment of the 108th AACS Squadron being assigned to the airfield.

The control tower closed and the field became inactive on 16 August 1945 and placed on standby status It was reassigned to Craig Field, Alabama in September 1945, then to Maxwell Field, Alabama as Auxiliary Field #3.

It was reopened by the United States Air Force Air Training Command on 1 July 1949 as Anniston Air Force Base and conducted contract flying training until 1 August 1950 when it was transferred to Air Materiel Command as a support airfield to support the Anniston Army Depot. On 30 June 1952, Anniston AFB was closed for the final time, with the land being sold to the city of Talladega.

The facility was vacant for little over a decade, when the city of Talladega began leasing the Hangar and adjacent land to a government contracting company named Quality Overhaul to overhaul Fire Fighting Vehicles for the US Air Force.

Anniston Insurance executive Bill Ward assisted NASCAR and International Speedway Corporation founder William H.G. (Bill) France to acquire the land to the west of the hangar, which contained much of the old runways; this was used to develop what would become Alabama International Motor Speedway, now known as Talladega Superspeedway, which opened in 1969.

Today the hangar on the former AFB still exists and is in use by another government contractor, ATAP, Inc, along with the aircraft parking ramp. The foundations of some of the station buildings northeast of the hangar can still be seen. The area has numerous taxiways and parts of former runways in various states of deterioration that are being used as access roads, one of which connects to the adjacent Talladega Municipal Airport.

While Talladega Municipal Airport sits next to the former base, it does not utilize any of the runways or taxiways of the former military airfield, the only shared history between the two facilities is the airport code "ASN" used by the FAA and IATA, and "KASN" in ICAO, all referencing the former Anniston Air Base, similar to airports on former air bases whose codes were retained in civilian use ("MCO" in Orlando).

== See also ==
- Alabama World War II Army Airfields
