= Talladega Superspeedway =

Motorsport track in the United States

- Tri-oval (1969–present)
- Location: 3366 Speedway Boulevard; Lincoln, Alabama, United States; 35096
- Coordinates: 33°33′58″N 86°4′12″W
- Capacity: 80,000
- Owner: NASCAR (2019–present); International Speedway Corporation (1969–2019)
- Broke ground: May 23, 1968; 58 years ago
- Opened: September 9, 1969; 57 years ago
- Construction cost: $5 million USD
- Former names: Alabama International Motor Speedway (1969–1989)
- Major events: Current: NASCAR Cup Series; Jack Link's 500 (1970–present); YellaWood 500 (1969–present); NASCAR O'Reilly Auto Parts Series; Ag-Pro 300 (1992–present); TPG 250 (2020–2022, 2024-present); NASCAR Truck Series; Love's RV Stop 225 (2006–present); Former: International Race of Champions (1984, 1986, 1990–1996, 1999–2001, 2003); AMA Superbike Championship (1980–1983); IMSA GT Championship (1971–1972, 1974–1976, 1978)
- Website: talladegasuperspeedway.com

Tri-Oval (1969–present)
- Surface: Asphalt
- Length: 2.660 mi (4.281 km)
- Turns: 4
- Banking: Turns: 33° Tri-oval: 16.5° Straights: 2°
- Race lap record: 0:46.530 ( (United States) Parker Kligerman, Toyota Camry, 2019, NASCAR Cup)

Road Course (1969–1989)
- Surface: Asphalt
- Length: 4.000 mi (6.437 km)
- Turns: 11
- Race lap record: 1:53.400 ( (United States) Peter Gregg, Porsche 935, 1978, IMSA GTX)

Talladega Superspeedway (formerly known as Alabama International Motor Speedway from 1969 to 1989) is a 2.660 mi (4.281 km) tri-oval superspeedway in Lincoln, Alabama, United States. Built in 1969, the track has hosted a variety of racing events, primarily races sanctioned by NASCAR. The track is owned by NASCAR and led by track president Josh Harris. The grandstand can seat 80,000 as of 2022. Along with the main track, the track complex also has a 4.000 mi (6.437 km) roval-style road course.

In the early 1960s, NASCAR founder Bill France Sr. built the track near Talladega, Alabama, after a failed proposal to build one in Spartanburg, South Carolina. Over its first couple decades, the track gained a reputation as a fast and wild facility with speeds of over 200 mph (320 km/h), major accidents, and unusual occurrences. NASCAR's introduction of the restrictor plate and the appearance of pack racing in the late 1980s exacerbated its chaotic reputation, with several "Big One" accidents involving 10 or more cars.

== Description ==
=== Configuration ===
Talladega Superspeedway in its current form is measured at 2.660 mi (4.281 km), with 33 degrees of banking in the turns, 16.5 degrees of banking in the tri-oval section, and two degrees of banking in the straights. The track, similar in shape to the NASCAR-owned Daytona International Speedway, differs from Daytona due to its start-finish line; Talladega's start finish line is around a 1/4 mile (0.40 km) away from the track's center point. Within NASCAR's schedule, Talladega Superspeedway is the longest oval NASCAR races on during the season. The track also has a 4 miles (6.4 km) roval-style road course.

=== Amenities ===
Talladega Superspeedway is located near Interstate 20. As of 2022, Talladega Superspeedway has a capacity of 80,000, down from 143,000 in 2003. The track's infield covers about 270 acres, and hosts around 2,700 RV parking spots. In total, the track complex covers around 3,000 acres, the largest on the NASCAR schedule.

==== Race weekend party scene ====
Talladega Superspeedway is known for its infield party scene during race weekends, gaining a reputation for a chaotic, Woodstock/Mardi Gras-type atmosphere. The party scene has been described by ESPN's Ryan McGee as "full of redneck engineering and school buses and questionable decisions". Games, parades, and nudity has been reported by numerous journalists as being commonplace; with reporter Mike Hembree stating that the focus of the party scene was "toward beer, liquor, racing, boobs and, somewhat down the list, college football." Elizabeth Blackstock, writer for Jalopnik, stated that at Talladega, "People turn into animals. If you’ve ever wanted to know what it looks like when humans just cease giving a fuck, I highly recommend finding your nearest infield campground." Considered to be "notoriously rowdy" in the 1980s, by the 2000s, Talladega Superspeedway officials started to crack down on "hard-core lawlessness", adding in a makeshift jail and making the scene "more civilized".

== Track history ==
=== Planning and construction ===
==== Failed Spartanburg proposal ====
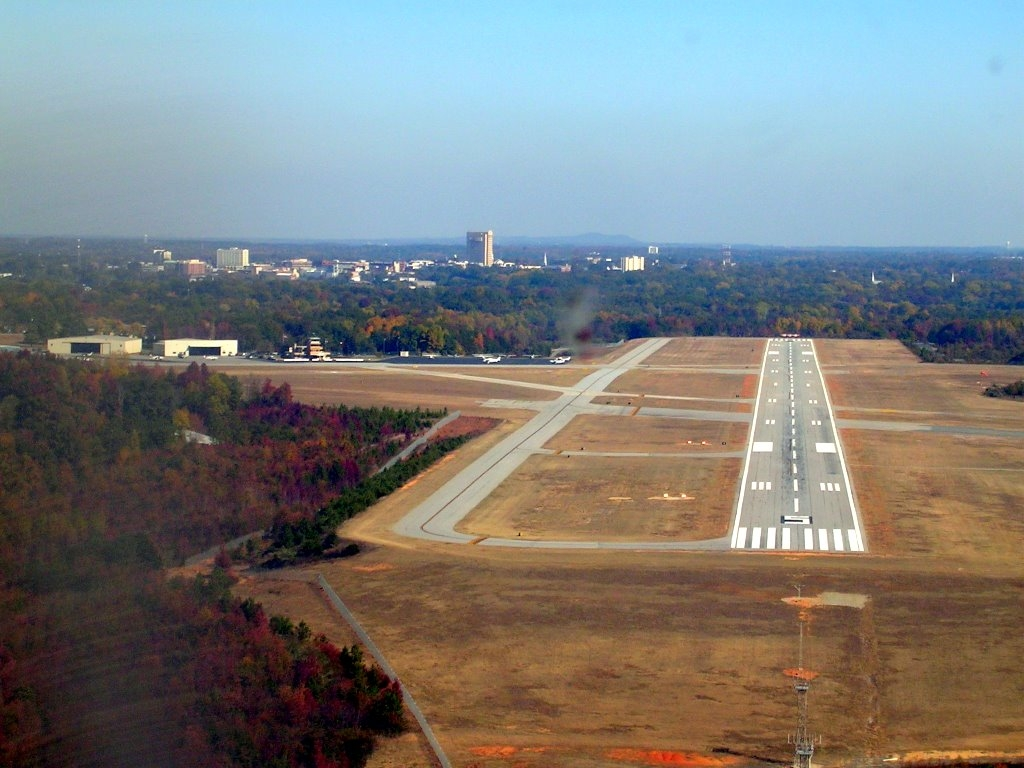
The Spartanburg Memorial Airport (pictured in 2008). Bill France Sr. originally drafted plans to build a track similar to AIMS near the airport. However, plans to build the track in Spartanburg fell through.

Sometime in the early 1960s, NASCAR founder Bill France Sr. made initial plans to construct a 1.500 mi (2.414 km) superspeedway in Spartanburg, South Carolina, with the help of Spartanburg native Joe Littlejohn. In October 1963, designs for the Spartanburg track were drawn up by C. H. Moneypenny, with it planned to be built near the Spartanburg Downtown Memorial Airport. An official announcement was made on February 18, 1964, with stated hopes of building 50,000 seats and a budget of "near a million dollars"; it was also touted as a "little Daytona". However, while France Sr. later stated that plans were "far away from building" in March, local residents near the airport immediately raised opposition towards the proposal in the Spartanburg City Council; particularly due to concerns of increased noise. Despite further rumored plans to build a new airport terminal for the airport, further opposition was raised due to local blue laws. Despite this, in May, France Sr. continued to scout for potential sites. The proposal was eventually rejected by the local city council; the rejection, which heavily contributed to the declining racing scene of Spartanburg that started in the start of the 1960s, was seen by locals as the point of no return of the city's decline. In an interview, longtime NASCAR driver James Hylton stated that the city council "stuck a knife in their hearts, their own hearts. Because if the city fathers in Spartanburg and Spartanburg County had approved that, this would be Talladega... All the people who had a vote on that really didn't understand racing. They really didn't have a clue as to what the future held."

==== Anniston Air Force Base proposal ====
According to multiple people associated with Talladega Superspeedway's beginnings, sometime in 1965, former driver and businessman Fonty Flock convinced France Sr. to scout the Anniston, Alabama, area. At the beginning of 1966, The Anniston Star reported that France Sr. was negotiating to build a $1.5 million (adjusted for inflation, $14,884,615) facility in Eastaboga near the Talladega Municipal Airport. However, according to France Sr., local Alabama tax laws and the cost of surrounding land were deterrents to the track's construction. In February, France Sr. had reportedly began negotiations in Gadsden. However, in the next several months, France Sr. and city of Talladega officials resumed negotiations for the Eastaboga proposal. In August, the Alabama Senate passed a measure to allow Talladega and its nearby cities to finance the track with their own credit. The measure was signed by governor George Wallace soon after; by this point, Talladega Industrial Development Board chairman O. V. Hill stated that the budget for the project had risen to $6 million (adjusted for inflation, $59,538,462), and planned to host a capacity from 40 to 50 thousand seats. Leaders of the now-proposed 2.5 miles (4.0 km) track also hoped to raise $3 million and acquire approximately 1,500 acres of land to kickstart the project. Nearing the end of the year, leaders awaited a verdict from the Union Oil Company on whether they would invest $3.5 million for the project.

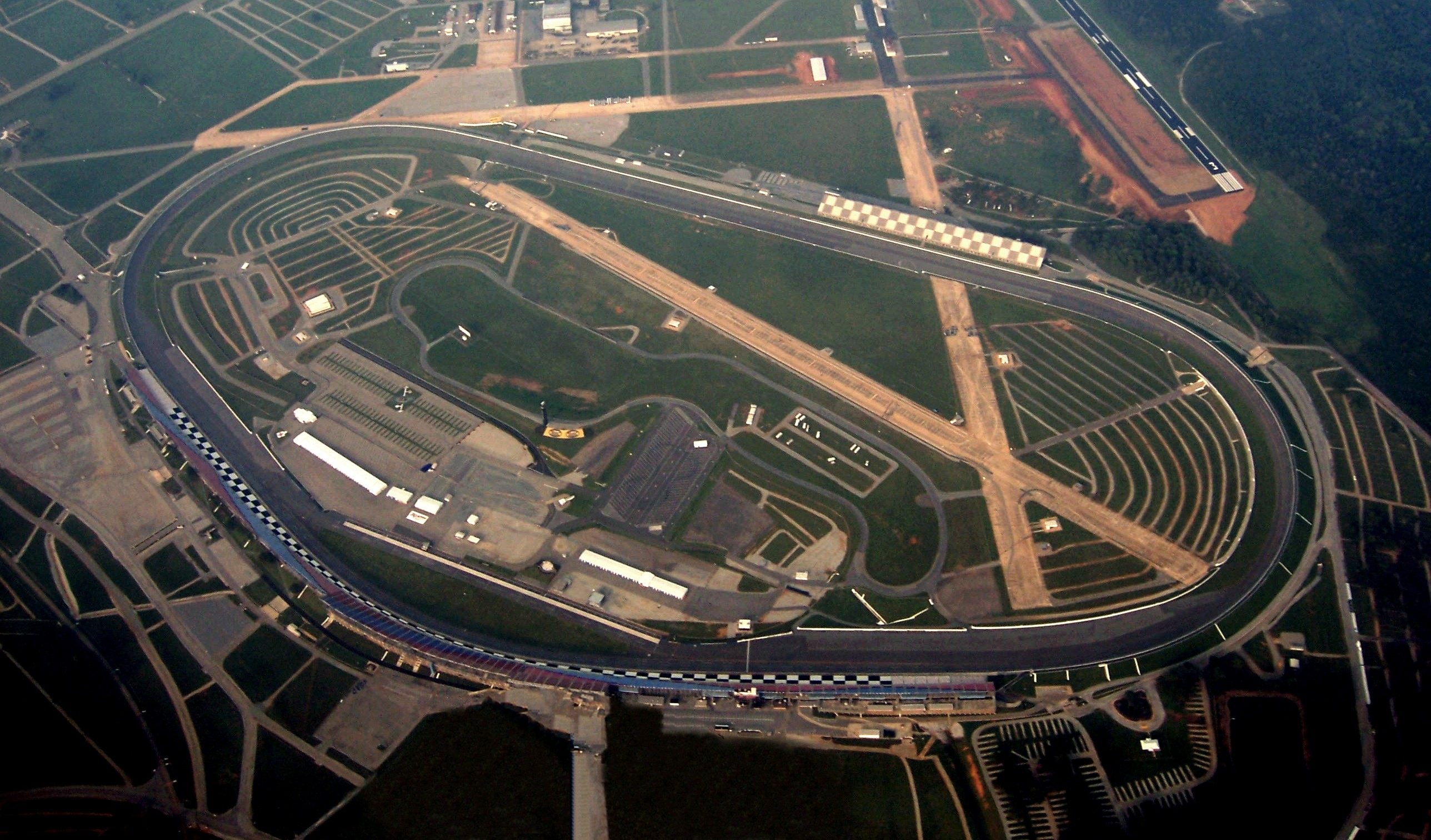
An overhead picture of Talladega Superspeedway. The track was built using the remains of the defunct Anniston Air Force Base.

France Sr. later stated hopes of starting construction in the summer of 1967 and to open the track sometime in 1969. A finalized plan of the project was reported in April 1967, which according to France Sr. was "economically justified". In June, France Sr. stated in The Anniston Star that the "bond market just isn't what it should be at the present"; however, speculated rumors of Pure Oil, a subsidiary of Union Oil, investing the entire amount needed to finance the project were also being made, with a feasibility report stating that the project was "highly favorable". In the next month, a party associated with France and Pure Oil were reported to have invested two-thirds of the financing needed for its construction, along with the city of Talladega offering 650 acres. At the beginning of 1968, France Sr. announced that the track would be longer than the France Sr.-owned Daytona International Speedway by "400 [to] 600 feet". In the same announcement, he also stated that he aimed to start construction in a couple of months and that the project was "90 percent assured". On March 14, Talladega County officials announced that they hoped for a final verdict on access road financing in order to finally approve the project; however, a sale of $2 million to First Alabama Securities relating to industrial bonds failed to go through. Despite this, France Sr. and Hill did not consider the lack of funds to be a major problem, and instead were so confident that they thought that the purchase would nevertheless be secured within the next month. In April, the city of Talladega gave France Sr. 2,000 acres at the site of the former Anniston Air Force Base.

On May 16, 1968, France Sr. officially announced the construction of the project along with a new airport runway near the track, which came at a final projected cost of $5 million and an opening date in September 1969. Groundbreaking occurred seven days later, with the facility officially being named the Alabama International Motor Speedway (AIMS). At the groundbreaking ceremony, France Sr. stated plans to host NASCAR, sports car, and motorcycle events at the facility. France Sr.'s son, Bill France Jr., was placed in charge of AIMS. During construction, the track was advertised to have bankings steeper than Daytona International Speedway and potential average speeds over 200 miles per hour (320 km/h). In October, work began on constructing grandstands, which involved bulldozing part of the Talladega Mountains. In April 1969, a 4 miles (6.4 km) "roval" road course was announced by France Sr. That same month, reports by the Associated Press stated that AIMS was selling 70 tickets daily on average. In July, the amount of tickets sold daily was "100 or more", with the goal of 100,000 people coming to the inaugural race being "assured". The next month, the only construction fatality occurred when W. L. Harry died when a crane hit his head, crushing his skull.

=== Chaotic first years ===
==== 1969 Talladega 500 ====
A date to christen AIMS was scheduled for September 14, 1969, for the 1969 Talladega 500. The first tire tests for the facility were run by LeeRoy Yarbrough and Donnie Allison in early August, with both claiming unofficial world closed circuit speed records. Both drivers complained of "rough places" on the surface of the track during testing. Later in the month, Bobby Allison in a newly-unveiled Dodge Charger Daytona ran another test session; Bobby later claimed that the track had "great big holes" in its surface. France Sr. admitted the appearance of three holes due to Hurricane Camille, but also claimed that the holes were filled before Bobby made testing runs. On race weekend, although the track surface was completed, numerous amenities, including VIP suites, were either unfinished or "barebones" according to longtime motorsports journalist Dave Despain.

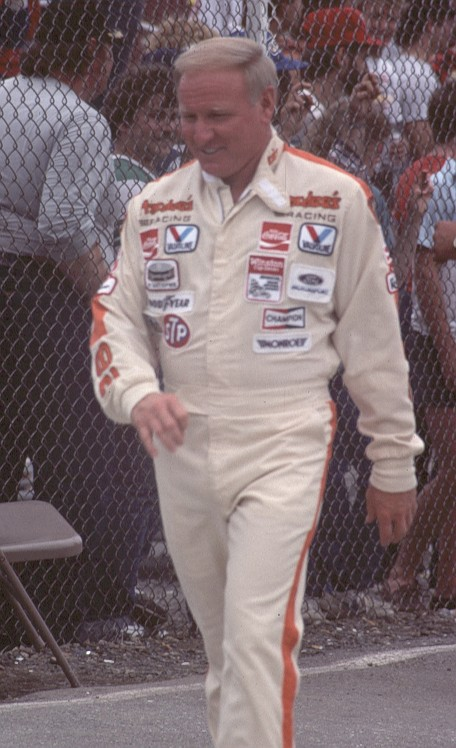
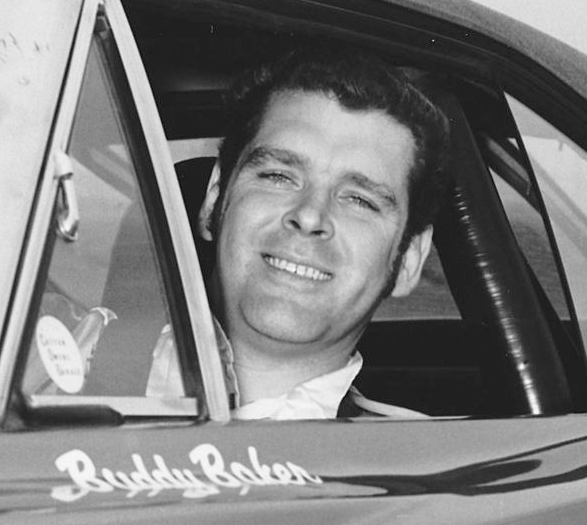
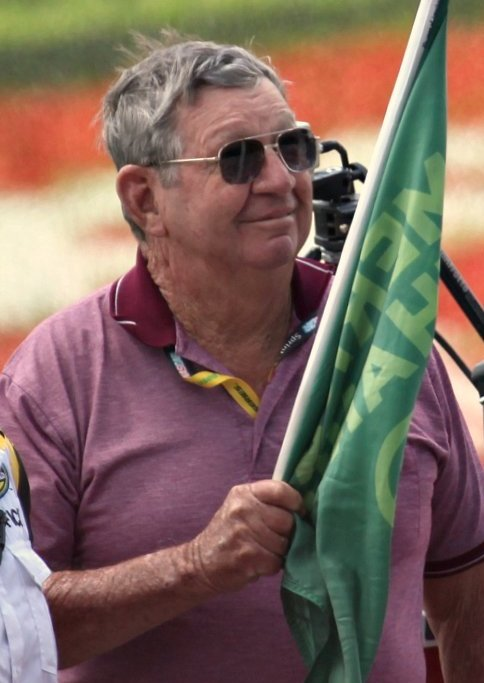
Numerous drivers, including Cale Yarborough (left), Buddy Baker (middle), and Donnie Allison (right) complained about a rough track surface during the track's inaugural race weekend.

The track officially opened to the public on September 9 for practice sessions for the Talladega 500. The track surface drew complaints from drivers, particularly drivers from the newly-formed Professional Drivers Association (PDA), a drivers' union. PDA drivers Cale Yarborough, Buddy Baker, and Charlie Glotzbach all reported that the surface was "rough" and caused increased tire wear amongst both Goodyear and Firestone tires; the two tire suppliers for the race. Baker later added, "they haven’t built a tire out of anything that will stand up if you hit a chuckhole at 200 miles per hour". Tires were also reported to have only lasted 4 laps until they became "shredded", with Firestone pulling out of the event. Anniston Star writer George Smith remarked that due to the never-before-seen speeds in NASCAR, "no one really knew what to expect of speeds in the 195-200 m.p.h. range." As a result of the complaints, drivers asked France Sr. if the race to be postponed; he refused, mainly due to the high cost of building the track, which France Sr. feared would bankrupt the track if the race was postponed. He proceeded to tell the drivers to race at slower speeds; this was refused by the drivers. After an incident that involved Yarbrough punching France Sr. after France Sr. called Yarbrough too scared to race, a meeting involving 36 PDA drivers almost unanimously agreed to withdraw from the event.

Despite almost every major driver withdrawing from the race, with the exceptions of Tiny Lund and Bobby Isaac, France Sr. announced his intents to still run the race, stating in The Anniston Star, "I can't guarantee you how many cars will run right now, but there will be a race Sunday afternoon." After the first race ever ran at the track, a 400 miles (640 km) preliminary NASCAR Grand American Series race won by Ken Rush, France Sr. decided to seek out non-PDA, Grand American, and PDA scab drivers to race in the main event; he also let in the smaller Grand American "pony cars", which had less power, run in the event. Chrysler, who was set to debut the winged Dodge Charger Daytona at the event, replaced Bobby Allison with PDA scab Richard Brickhouse. To appease fans, France Sr. also announced that any fan with a Talladega 500 ticket stub could attend any Daytona or Talladega race for free in 1970. The race ran without any major issues, with Brickhouse winning the event in front of a crowd of 64,000, which was lower than expected. However, second-place finisher Jim Vandiver, who was driving an older Dodge model, accused NASCAR of rigging the race; the protests were unsuccessful.

==== Don Naman era, slow expansion ====
The track's second season oversaw decreasing attendance and increased disdain over the quality of racing at the track. The 1970 Alabama 500 saw a decrease of over 10,000 people from the 1969 Talladega 500, with NASCAR officials stating the attendance was "disappointing". In June, reporters stated that AIMS had covered up several parts of grandstands with tarp due to a lack of spectators during races. A series of races held at AIMS in July were described by Anniston Star writer Tommy Hornsby as "a complete flop". In October 1970, AIMS appointed Don Naman, promoter of the Tennessee-based Smoky Mountain Speedway, as the track's first general manager. Within the first month, Naman announced an improvement project that aimed to remove track surface bumps along with renovating press boxes and the track's control tower. As part of the project, the track surface was resurfaced by using a mixture that acted as a sealant. The first race under Naman's tenure saw increased attendance, with 63,500 attending despite heavy doubt placed onto the track, leading to hopes of later races having more attending per race. Within 1972, attendance had risen with Naman stated hopes of building new grandstands; the track also had a better reputation in local Alabama media. The next year, attendance had risen to such a point to where one Anniston Star reporter had described AIMS' future as "all sunshine".

Expansions and renovations remained at a slow pace throughout Naman's tenure. In 1975, AIMS officials announced renovations worth over $200,000; among said renovations was the addition of a new press box on the track's frontstretch that costed around $150,000, additional loudspeakers, and additional spectator gates. Further renovations to paddock areas were announced in 1977, along with the addition of a new 2,200-seat grandstand. A second repave was also announced in 1979 due to heavy rain. That same year, Naman stated that officials hoped to expand to accommodate at least 150,000 fans by 1990. The next year, a new, $80,000 scoring stand was added that accommodated around 100 people. In 1985, $200,000 worth of renovations were made to the track's garage area and parts of the grandstands. A new, 2,500-seat tower, the Anniston Tower, was constructed in 1986 and completed the following year, increasing the grandstand capacity of AIMS to 72,000. In November 1986, talks of annexing AIMS into the city of Talladega was proposed by Talladega mayor Larry Barton in order to pay off a $1 million deficit; however, annexation talks died down by early next year.

==== Rising speeds, breaking records ====
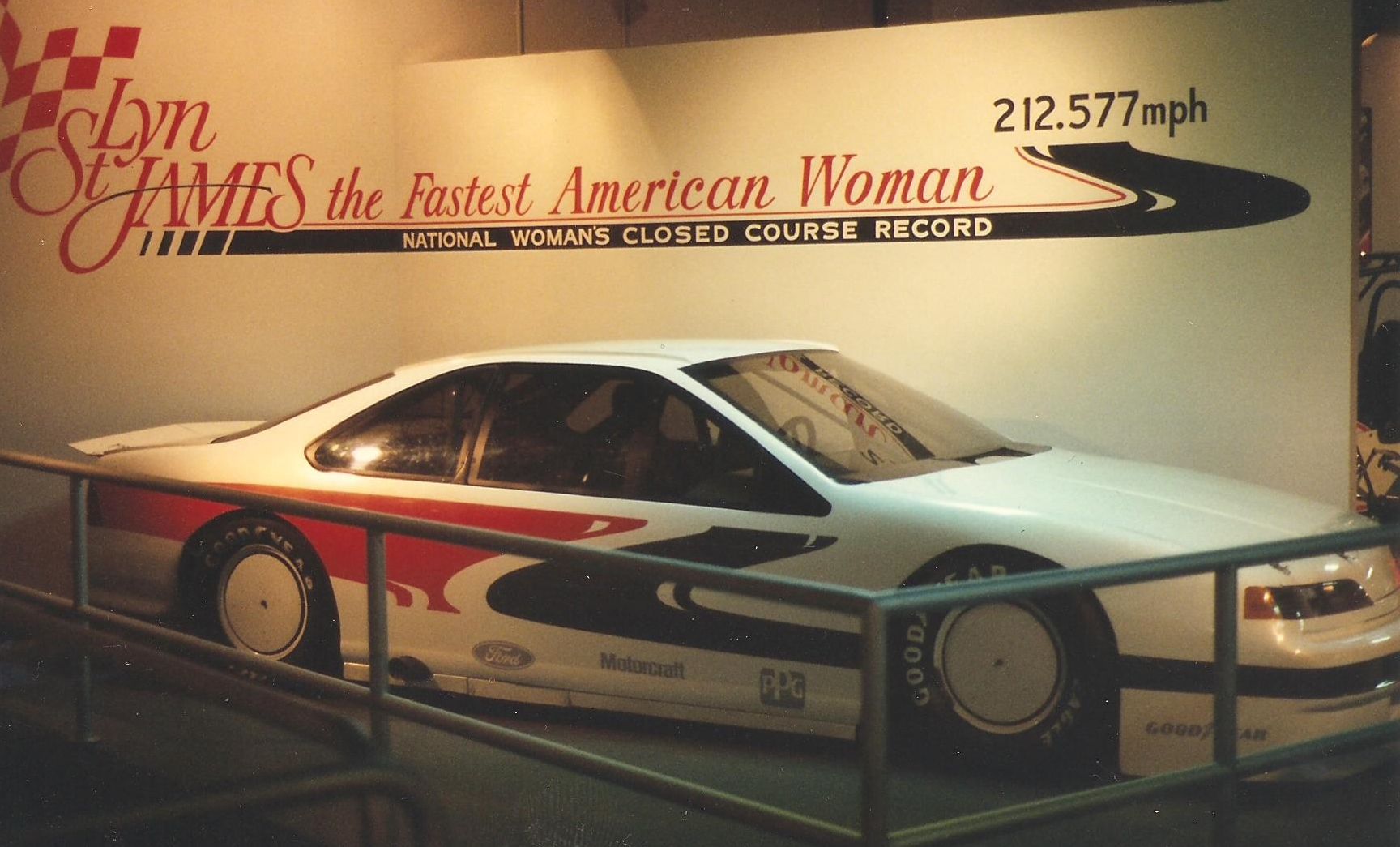
Lyn St. James' car driven in 1988 at Talladega to break the women's closed circuit speed record.

Within the track's early years, the track oversaw increasing speeds, with multiple world records being broken; some records were more than once were broken at the track. In March 1970, Buddy Baker became the first person to break 200 mph (320 km/h) on a closed course, setting an average speed of 200.449 mph (322.591 km/h). Seven months later, Bobby Isaac broke Baker's record, setting a lap of 201.104 miles per hour (323.646 km/h). In 1971, Paula Murphy broke the women's world record for the closed-circuit speed record, setting a lap of 171.499 miles per hour (276.001 km/h). In August 1974, A. J. Foyt took the overall closed-circuit speed record from Mario Andretti, setting a speed of an average speed of 217.315 mph (349.735 km/h). Foyt's record was broken a year later by Mark Donohue, with Donohue setting an average speed of 221.160 mph (355.923 km/h).

In the 1980s, the women's world record for the closed-circuit speed record was broken numerous times. Over the course of two days, Lyn St. James broke the women's record and became the first women to break over 200 mph, setting a lap of 204.233 mph (328.681 km/h) on the second day of testing. The women's world record was broken three times within the next five years; St. James broke her own record in October 1988, and Patty Moise broke the record soon after St. James' attempt the following year in December. Moise proceeded to break her own record a month later, setting a lap of 217.498 mph (350.029 km/h).

==== Injury and chaos-riddled period, alleged Talladega Curse ====
"Jim Hunter started all that... in the old, old days he was the PR director here. He was trying to come up with some way to build the mystique of Talladega. So he put together kind of a little public relations deal of talking about how Talladega was built on an old Indian burial ground... You heard the Bobby Isaac story, right? Jim was just building on that."

— Former Talladega Superspeedway general manager Grant Lynch's comments on the beginnings of the Talladega Curse

In the track's early years, numerous deadly, injurious, or unusual occurred on and off the track. Jim Hunter, a publicity director for the track, encouraged a belief in a "Talladega Curse" stemming from an urban legend that the speedway's construction on indigenous American land taken as part of the Trail of Tears; according to Superspeedway general manager Grant Lynch, the idea was a marketing tactic to "build the mystique of Talladega".

In the 1973 Winston 500, a 19-car crash hospitalized four drivers; Wendell Scott's injuries effectively ended his racing career. That same year at the Talladega 500, driver Larry Smith became the first to die at the track when he blew a tire and hit the wall, suffering major head injuries. In the same race, longtime driver Bobby Isaac retired abruptly from the race and full-time racing; he said he heard voices in his head telling him to quit. At the 1974 Winston 500, ten of the top 11 qualified cars reported that their cars had been "sabotaged", with various mechanical failures; the culprit was never found. In 1975, pit crew member Randy Owens and driver Tiny Lund were killed in separate races.

Unusual incidents continued into the 1980s. At the 1982 Winston 500, L. W. Wright, a confidence trickster, was able to launder thousands of dollars' worth of equipment from multiple organizations, including Sterling Marlin, Goodyear, and NASCAR themselves. After attempting to race and subsequently being parked during the race for being too slow, he vanished without a trace despite a manhunt, and was only found in 2022 when he agreed to reveal himself for a podcast. At the 1986 Winston 500, spectator Darren Crowder broke into the race's safety car and took it for a joyride in what longtime NASCAR journalist Steve Waid called as "Talladega’s most bizarre incident". At the 1987 Winston 500, Bobby Allison blew a tire in the track's frontstretch at high speeds, causing his car to go airborne and crash into a protective catchfence, injuring four spectators. Considered one of the most influential moments in NASCAR's history, Allison's crash led NASCAR to introduce the restrictor plate to reduce speeds; a requirement that lasted until 2019.

=== Mike Helton and Grant Lynch eras ===
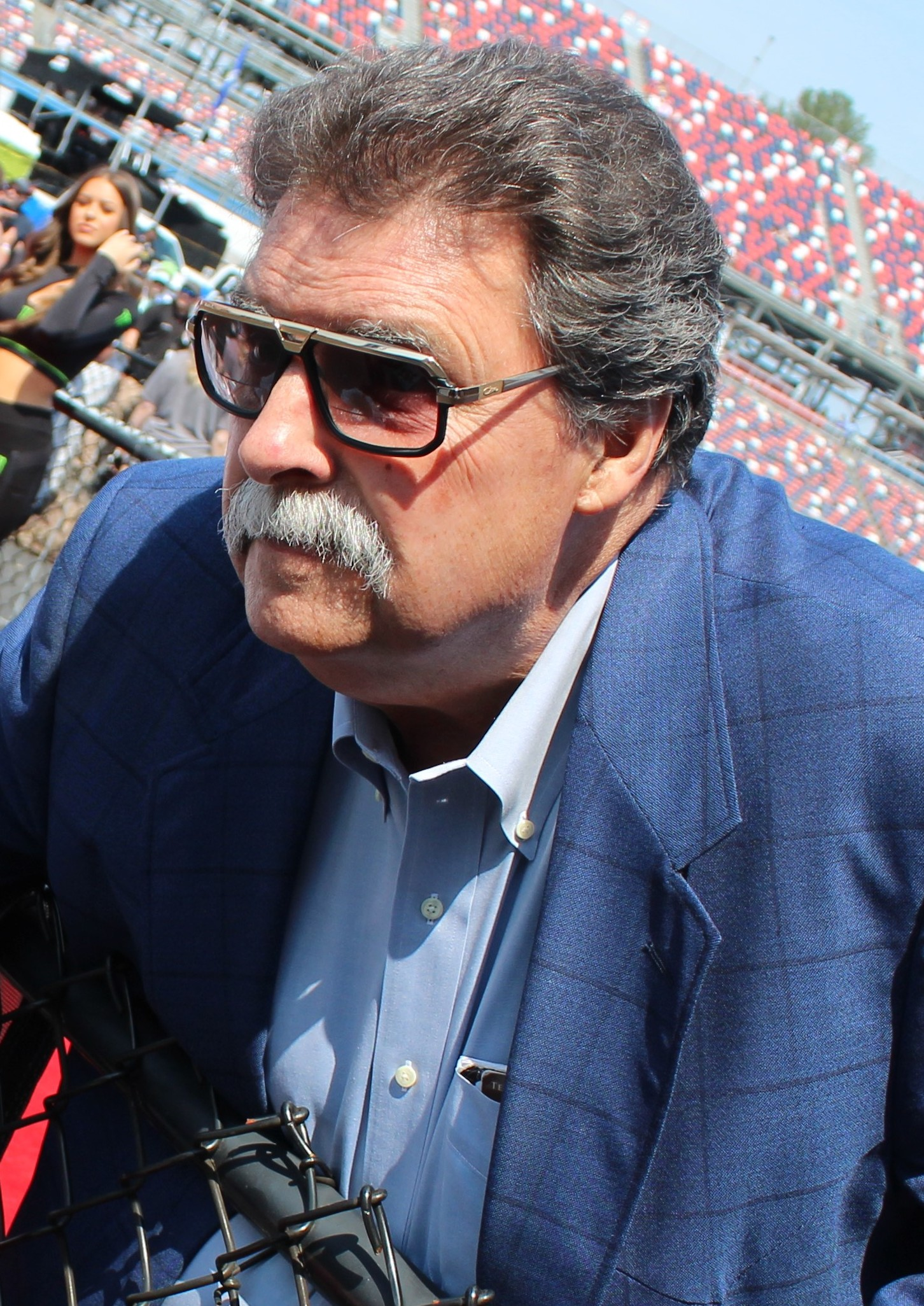
Eventual NASCAR president Mike Helton (pictured in 2019) was the general manager of Talladega Superspeedway from 1989 to 1993.

In October 1987, Naman announced his intent to retire to become a member of the board of directors at the International Motorsports Hall of Fame, with former Atlanta International Raceway general director Mike Helton taking his position. One year after Allison's 1987 crash at AIMS, a renovated and heavier catchfence replaced the original. On January 30, 1989, Helton became the president of the track; on the same day, the track was renamed Talladega Superspeedway, with publicity director Jim Freeman stating in a press release that "it's shorter, and everybody called it 'Talladega' anyway". Helton made numerous renovations to the Superspeedway. In 1990, upgrades to all of the frontstretch grandstands were made so they could withstand a double-tiered system; 2,000 seats were also added to the Birmingham Tower, along with a new media center. A new infield campground was added in May 1992; it was met with praise. Further additions to the Birmingham Tower were announced later that year, with around 3,000 seats being constructed. At the end of 1993, Helton left to become the vice president of competition for NASCAR, with general manager Grant Lynch taking Helton's position.

Lynch expanded Talladega Superspeedway due to fears that the track was falling behind the amenities of rival tracks, particularly ones built by Bruton Smith's Speedway Motorsports. Seats were added in 1994 and 1995, with 3,100 and 5,000 seats being added in each year, respectively. A new grandstand, the 7,800-seat Gadsden Tower, was added in 1997; by this point, temporary stands were also added to accommodate more fans for its NASCAR races. Another 11,000-seat tower was announced the following year, increasing the total capacity of the track's grandstands to 120,000; the project was the track's ninth expansion in the last decade. Within the same year, the track also received a makeover; landscaping was done to make the track visible from Interstate 20 and the seats were colored red and blue to replace the "historically grey and dull" aesthetic of the track. A second phase of expansion following the 1998 renovation was also announced that same year, with hopes of the track eventually hosting "well above 200,000" within its grandstands. A 22,000-seat backstretch grandstand, the Allison Grandstand, was announced in April 1999 and completed in October of that year. Another expansion to the O. V. Hill Grandstands was made in 2001, with 5,200 seats being added. By 2003, according to the Montgomery Advertiser, the track hosted a grandstand seating capacity of 143,000.

In December 2005, track officials announced a complete repave of Talladega; the first since 1979. Construction on the repave started on May 2, 2006, a day later than expected due to rain. The repave was met with positive reactions from drivers, including Tony Stewart and Dennis Setzer. It was eventually completed by September 25 of that year, in time for ARCA Re/Max Series testing. The next year, Lynch was replaced by general manager Rick Humphrey, with Lynch being transferred to work at the corporate ISC offices. A $13 million, two-phase renovation project was announced in 2009, which aimed to renovate outdated seating and improve accessibility. Lynch came back to his old position the following year when Humphrey was transferred to ISC. The early 2010s saw steep attendance declines due to the effects of the Great Recession; a peak of approximately 190,000 in the 2003 Aaron's 499 had fallen to 108,500 by the 2012 iteration of the same event. In 2013, track officials announced that grandstand capacity would be decreased to 80,000, demolishing the backstretch Allison Grandstands. In lieu of the Allison Grandstands, officials decided to honor the Alabama Gang by renaming the backstretch.

==== Continued reputation of wild, crash-riddled track ====
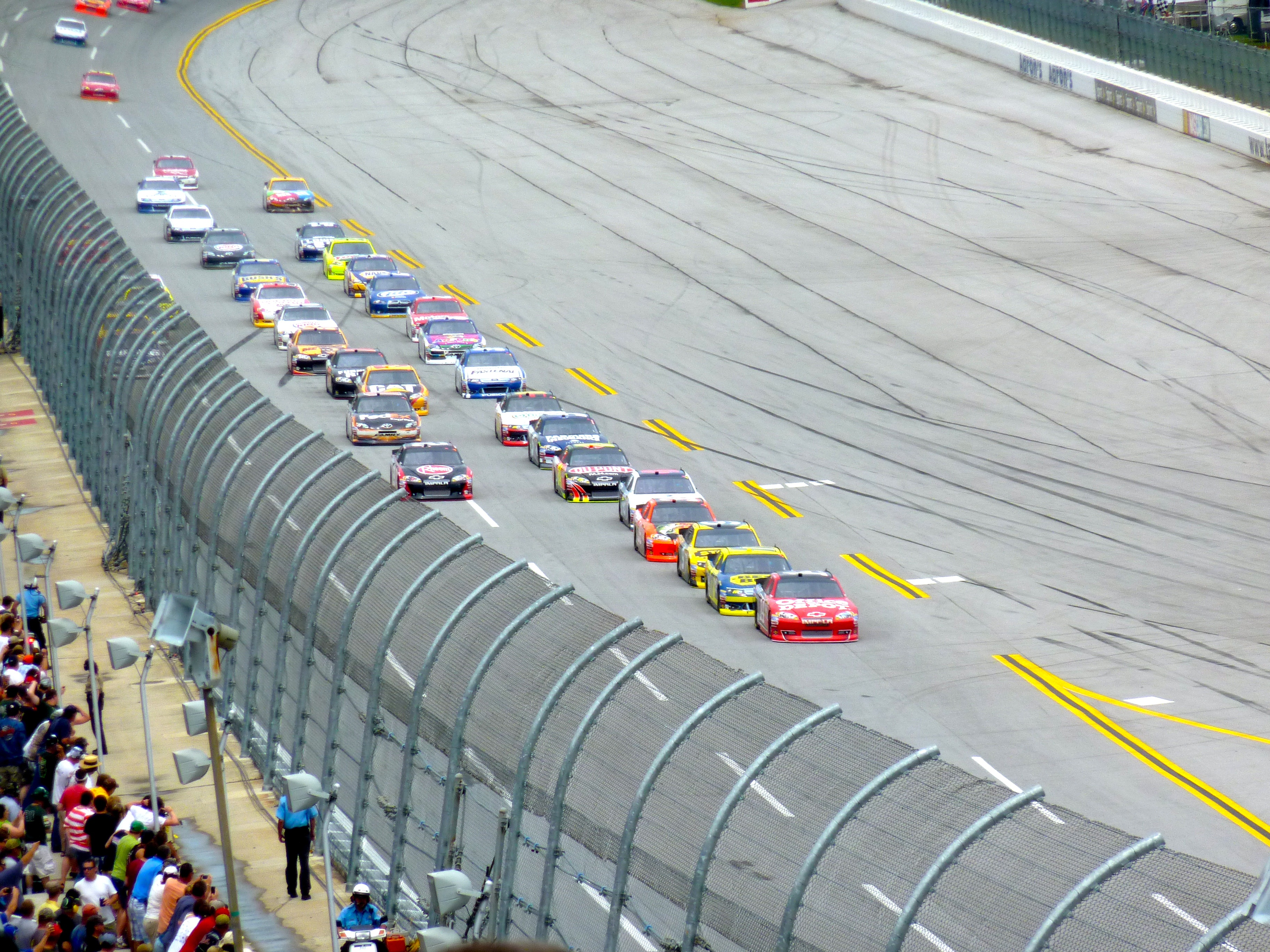
Tony Stewart leads the field during the 2012 Aaron's 499. Due to the introduction of the restrictor plate, cars raced in big packs, with the frequency of multi-car crashes increasing.

The track oversaw continued major crashes as part of the introduction of the restrictor plate mandated in the wake of Bobby Allison's crash in the 1987 Winston 500, cars were made drastically slower; an unintended consequence due to slower speeds was the introduction of pack racing. As part of restrictor plate racing, major accidents involving numerous cars, often called the "Big One", occurred often. At the 1993 DieHard 500, two separate major accidents occurred. Early in the race, multiple drivers were involved in a seven-car crash; one of them, Stanley Smith, suffered a basilar skull fracture that affected Smith for the rest of his life. In the same accident, Jimmy Horton's car went over the protective wall; the first of its kind since 1969 in the NASCAR Cup Series. Later in the race, Neil Bonnett's car went airborne and hit the catchfence on the track's frontstretch, tearing a 20-foot gap. The next year at the 1994 Winston Select 500, a multi-car accident involving Mark Martin sent Martin through the infield of the track, with Martin breaking through an infield guardrail. At the 1996 Winston Select 500, Ricky Craven was involved in a 14-car accident that sent Craven's car airborne at nearly the same spot during Horton's crash in 1993; however, due to a newly-added catchfence that was added in the turn in the wake of Horton's crash, Craven's car was able to stay within the track confines.

Heading into the new millennium, major accidents continued, with incidents involving at least 20 cars occurring frequently. At the 2002 Aaron's 312, a 27-car pileup occurred, breaking an all-time record for the most cars involved in an incident in any of NASCAR's top three series in the modern era. At the Aaron's 499 that same year, an incident late in the race involved two dozen cars. The record was tied at the 2003 Aaron's 499, where the accident set a new all-time NASCAR Cup Series record for most cars involved in a single incident. Another catchfence incident occurred at the 2009 Aaron's 499, when Carl Edwards' car went airborne on the final lap, crashing into the catchfence and injuring seven spectators. Three years later at the 2012 Good Sam Roadside Assistance 500, a 25-car accident occurred on the final lap of the race.

=== Brian Crichton era ===
In 2018, ISC announced a $50 million renovation to the track's infield which aimed to completely revamp the garage and media center along with the additions of several amenities, including additional suites and a new infield tunnel. Work on the project started in October of that year, and was completed in September 2019. Also in 2018, Lynch announced his retirement from the track, ending a 25-year reign. It took effect after the 2019 1000Bulbs.com 500, with vice president of marketing and sales Brian Crichton replacing Lynch. The next year, the track came under controversy when a member of Bubba Wallace's crew reported a potential noose in the midst of the George Floyd protests and the Black Lives Matter movement. A Federal Bureau of Investigation (FBI) investigation later determined that Wallace had not been a victim of a hate crime; the noose was a garage door pull rope that had existed since October 2019, although it was the only one shaped like a noose across NASCAR-owned tracks. To further modernize the track, a scoring pylon was removed in 2024 to get spectators to look at modern video screens for live scoring. In February 2026, Crichton announced to the Talladega County Commission his departure as president on February 16, with Darlington Raceway president Josh Harris replacing Crichton as a temporary replacement.

== Events ==
=== Racing ===
==== NASCAR ====
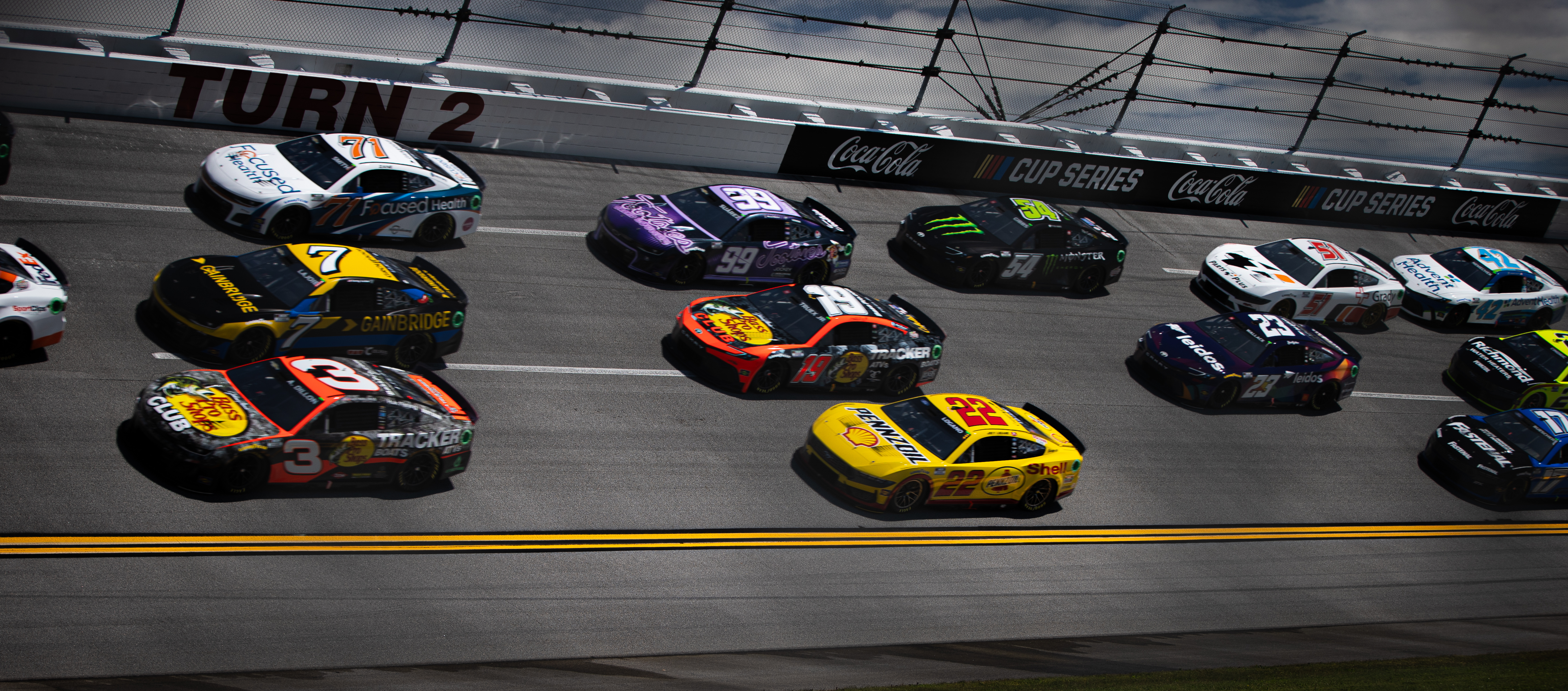
Cars racing at the spring 2024 GEICO 500. Since 1969, NASCAR has raced at the facility annually.

The facility has held two annual NASCAR weekends for most of its history, highlighted by the NASCAR Cup Series with the spring Jack Link's 500 and the fall YellaWood 500. The facility also hosts NASCAR O'Reilly Auto Parts Series and NASCAR Truck Series races as support events, including the Ag-Pro 300, TPG 250, and Love's RV Stop 225.

==== IMSA GT Championship ====
In the 1970s, the IMSA GT Championship raced at the track's road course numerous times. The series first raced at Talladega Superspeedway in 1971, and proceeded to race at the track five more times within the decade, including a six-hour endurance event in 1978. Although IMSA was scheduled to race at the circuit in 1979 in another six-hour event at the track, they opted to withdraw from the event.

==== Other racing events ====
The International Race of Champions (IROC) made occasional appearances at Talladega Superspeedway throughout its existence. The series first appeared in 1984 for a one-off appearance, opting to come back two years later before leaving again. IROC came back on a year-by-year basis starting in 1990, staying for a seven-year stint until leaving at the end of their 1996 season. IROC made its last year-by-year stint starting in 1999, racing there until 2003 (with the exception of 2002).

The AMA Superbike Championship raced at the circuit in the early 1980s, first making their appearance in 1980. The series made their last appearance at the circuit in 1983.

=== Other events ===
In 1974, initial plans were made for the track to host a music festival that was organized by the organizers of Woodstock; the organizers had chosen the track partly because "people could take drugs in there and not be bothered by law enforcement." Then-general manager Don Naman, who was a devout Catholic, refused because he thought the festival "wasn’t nice for the community". In 2024, the track hosted the Foodie’s Food Culture Festival, a food truck event.

== Lap records ==
As of April 2026, the fastest official lap records at Talladega Superspeedway (formerly Alabama International Motor Speedway) are listed as:

Category	Time	Driver	Vehicle	Event
D-shaped Tri-Oval (1969–present): 2.660 mi (4.281 km)
NASCAR Cup	0:46.530	Parker Kligerman	Toyota Camry	2019 1000Bulbs.com 500
NASCAR Xfinity	0:48.695	Joe Nemechek	Chevrolet Camaro SS	2018 Sparks Energy 300
NASCAR Truck	0:48.875	Trevor Bayne	Chevrolet Silverado	2020 Chevrolet Silverado 250
ARCA Menards	0:51.207	Taylor Reimer	Chevrolet SS	2026 Alabama Manufactured Housing 200
Road Course (1969–1989): 4.000 mi (6.437 km)
IMSA GTX	1:53.400	Peter Gregg	Porsche 935	1978 6 Hours of Talladega
IMSA GT	1:56.600	Michael Keyser	Chevrolet Monza	1976 'Bama 200
IMSA GTO	2:04.327	Tony DeLorenzo	Chevrolet Corvette	1972 Inver House 'Bama 200
IMSA AAC	2:07.130	Gene Felton	Buick Skylark	1978 6 Hours of Talladega
IMSA GTU	2:08.200	Elliot Forbes-Robinson (Note: All three drivers took the same lap time independently on the same race.); Brad Frisselle; Dave White	Datsun 240Z; Datsun 240Z; Porsche 911 S	1976 'Bama 200

== In popular culture ==
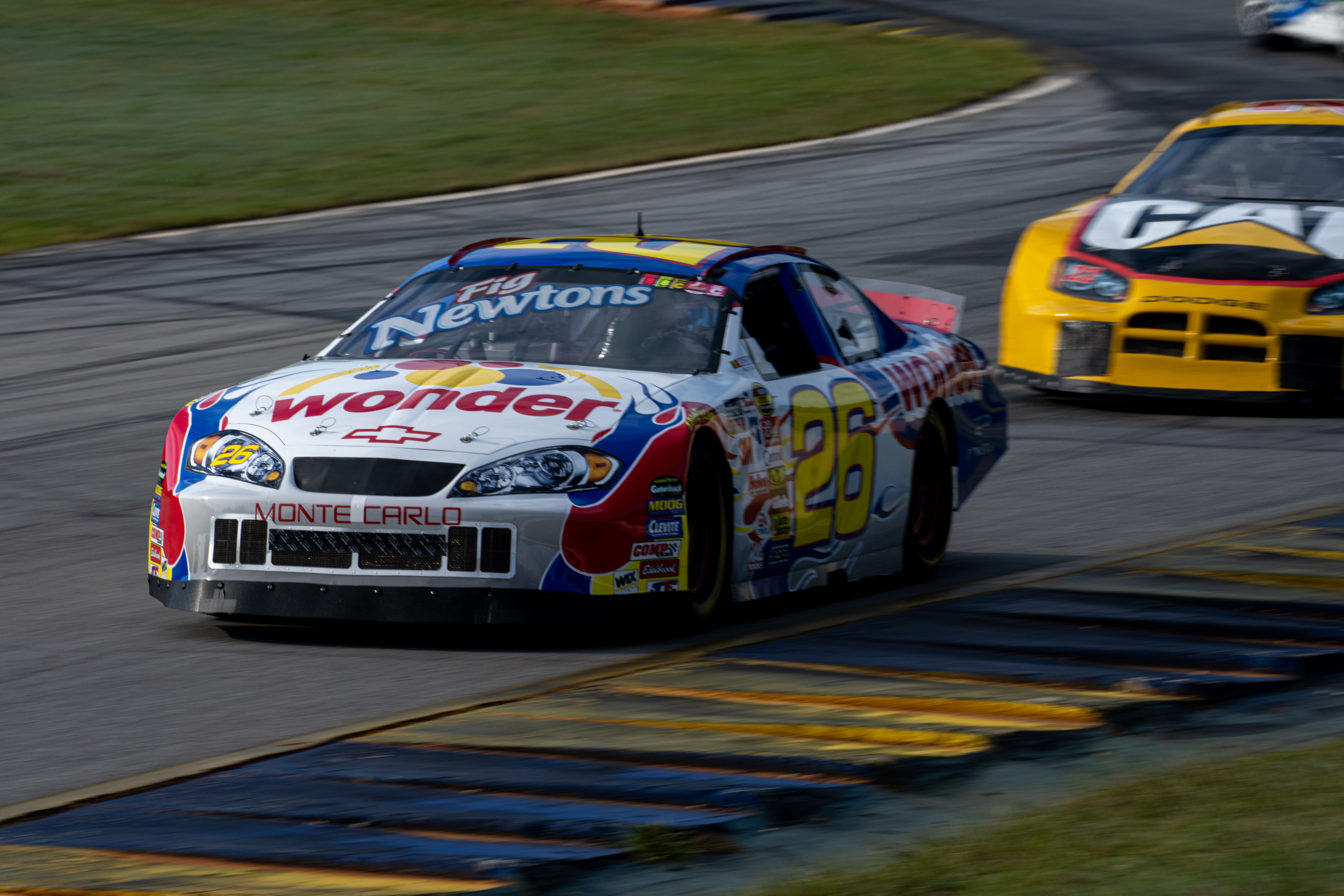
A car used in the filming of Talladega Nights: The Ballad of Ricky Bobby, a 2006 movie considered one of the most beloved auto racing-related films.

Talladega Nights: The Ballad of Ricky Bobby, a collaborative movie project of NASCAR and Sony Pictures starring Will Ferrell, was released on August 4, 2006. The movie was mostly produced in North Carolina, with some scenes for the movie's ending shot at Talladega during the 2005 UAW-Ford 500. It is considered one of the most beloved racing-related movies.

Parts of the 1983 movie Stroker Ace were filmed at the track. In 2005, parts of an episode for the eighth season of The Amazing Race were filmed there. In 2010, The Legend of Hallowdega, a mockumentary film produced by RadicalMedia as part of an Amp Energy advertising campaign that poked fun at the alleged Talladega Curse was released on Halloween. Four years later, Eric Church's "Talladega" mentioned attending auto racing events at the track.
