= Bill Freeman (racing driver) =

American professional motorsport racing driver

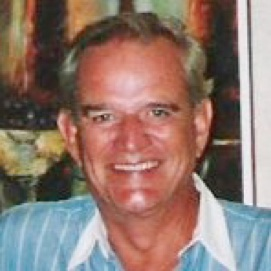
Bill Freeman

Bill Freeman was a professional racing driver, race team owner, motorsport racing enthusiast, race car manufacturer, and business entrepreneur.

== Racing career ==
- 1961 - 1967 Go Kart racing in the Midwest. Dual & Triple engine
- 1967 - 1972 S.C.C.A. Racing, Triumph TR4, MGB, 427 Cobra
- 1972 - 1978 S.C.C.A. Trans-Am, I.M.S.A. GT Racing, Can-Am (Corvette, Camaro, Porsche, Lola, McLaren)
- 1977 S.C.C.A. B-Production National Champion (SP Division - Porsche 911RSR) Freeman was S.C.C.A. National Champion in his 911 Porsche.
- 1979 - 1980 Freeman was the originator and supervisor for all aspects of a new Ferrari IMSA team.
- 1976 - 1983 Newman Freeman Racing (Can-Am, Indy, I.M.S.A.)

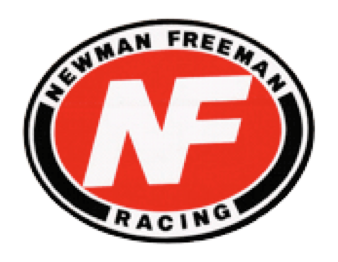
Newman Freeman Racing logo

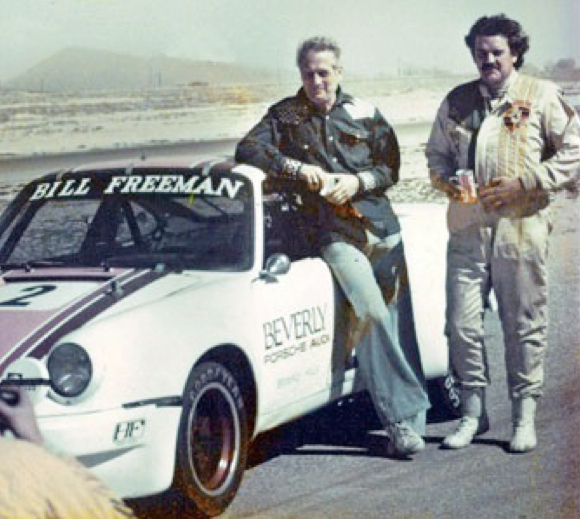
Paul Newman and Bill Freeman at Willow Springs Raceway in 1976 alongside Bill Freeman's Porsche 911.

In 1978 Paul Newman and Bill Freeman formed a racing partnership to compete in various forms of auto racing. The Racing Team was based in Santa Barbara, California. As the team's Managing Partner, Freeman managed all aspects and operations for this professional automobile racing company. In 1979, Bill Freeman negotiated a new home at Laguna Seca Raceway for the Newman Freeman Racing Can-Am team. Construction was completed in the early ‘80s and the new shop and offices in the pit area became a permanent home for the Budweiser sponsored team”.

The building has been used for two permanent driving schools since the ‘90s, and it’s still used today as a garage, media center and classrooms.

The company specialized in Indy Cars, Can-Am, and other high-performance motorsport racing. The team raced in Chevrolet-powered Spyder NF's, sponsored by Budweiser.

The "Newman Freeman Racing" team dominated North America's Can Am series in its Budweiser sponsored Lola team. The partnership attracted several drivers who would go on to become legends in the future, included Keke Rosberg, Elliott Forbes-Robinson, Bobby Rahal, Danny Sullivan, Teo Fabi, and others. Driving for Newman Freeman Racing, these drivers won many competitions including the Can-Am Team Championship of 1979.

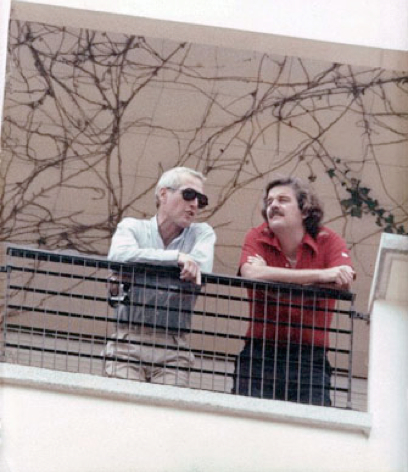
Paul Newman and Bill Freeman on Princess Grace's balcony overlooking the Monaco Grand Prix, 1979.

Bill Freeman is credited as the man who introduced Paul Newman to professional auto racing. In addition to the team management, Bill Freeman and Paul Newman drove many S.C.C.A. and I.M.S.A. events together, including the Sebring 12 hour endurance sports car race.

- 1983-1984 Gurney Freeman Racing

Freeman was General Manager and Team Manager for Gurney Freeman Racing Indianapolis 500 CART championship racing team and partners with Dan Gurney at All American Racers in Santa Ana, California.

- 1984–Present: Managing Partner - Newman Freeman Racing and CEO - Fine Sports Cars

== Other business ==
In 1984 Freeman also formed Fine Sports Cars with partner Ashton Marshall, to remanufacture, restore, and offer for sale legendary sports racing cars. The company was based in San Diego, California, with a showroom, The Fine Car Store, located in La Jolla, California.

In 2009 the company was expanded to include both sanctioned and certified cars and established a global network of workshops and suppliers.

== Awards ==
- Freeman was S.C.C.A. National Champion in his 911 Porsche in 1977
- Newman Freeman Racing won the Can-Am Team championship in 1979
- Freeman co-managed the race team which Paul Newman drove for in the 24 hours of Le Mans class winning victory in 1979
- AAR Gurney Freeman Racing set the fastest stock block qualifying lap in history for the 1982 Indianapolis 500
