= Talladega Municipal Airport =

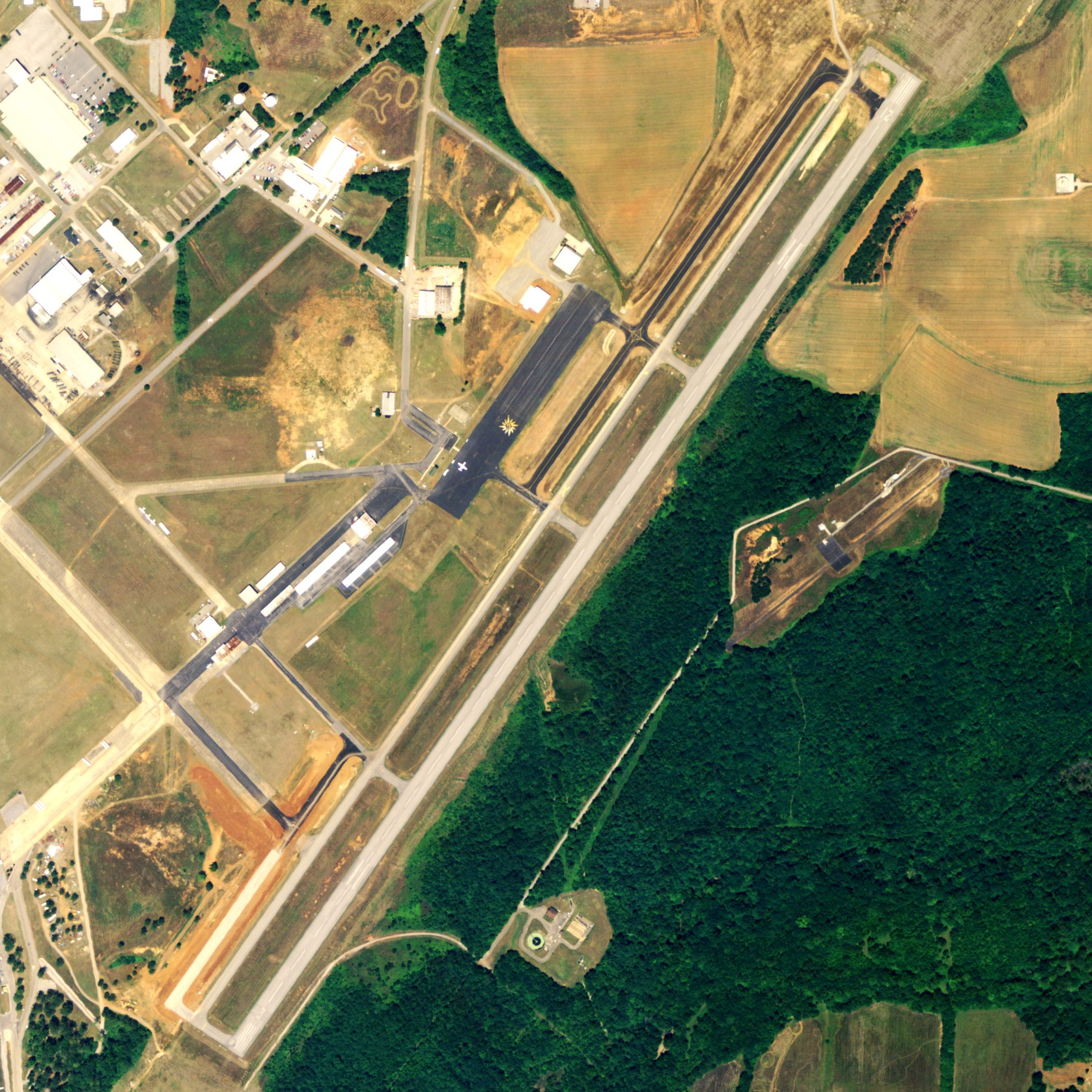
- NAIP aerial image, 2006
- IATA: ASN; ICAO: KASN; FAA LID: ASN

Summary
- Airport type: Public
- Owner: City of Talladega
- Serves: Talladega, Alabama
- Location: Lincoln, Alabama
- Elevation AMSL: 529 ft / 160 m
- Coordinates: 33°34′10″N 086°03′04″W
- Interactive map of Talladega Municipal Airport

Runways
Direction	Length		Surface
Direction	ft	m	Surface
4/22	6,032	1,839	Asphalt

Statistics (2017)
- Aircraft operations: 40,880
- Based aircraft: 51
- Source: Federal Aviation Administration

Talladega Municipal Airport (IATA: ASN, ICAO: KASN, FAA LID: ASN) is a city-owned public-use airport located eight nautical miles (9.2 mi; 15 km) northeast of the central business district of Talladega, a city in Talladega County, Alabama, adjacent to Talladega Superspeedway in the city of Lincoln. It is included in the FAA's National Plan of Integrated Airport Systems for 2011–2015, which categorized it as a general aviation facility.

== Facilities and aircraft ==
Talladega Municipal Airport covers an area of 1,029 acres (416 ha) at an elevation of 529 feet (161 m) above mean sea level. It has one runway designated 4/22 with an asphalt surface measuring 6,032 by 100 feet (1,839 by 30 m).

For the 12-month period ending February 13, 2017, the airport had 40,880 aircraft operations, an average of 112 per day: 89% general aviation (plus 3% local), 7% military, and 2% air taxi. At that time there were 51 aircraft based at this airport: 42 single- & 5 multi-engine, 1 jet, 2 helicopter and 1 ultralight.

== See also ==
- List of airports in Alabama
