= 1982 World Sportscar Championship =

Racing tournament

Seasons
- ← 1981 1983 →

The 1982 World Sportscar Championship was the 30th season of FIA World Sportscar Championship racing. It featured the 1982 World Endurance Championship for Drivers, which was contested over an eight-round series, and the 1982 World Endurance Championship for Manufacturers, which was contested over five rounds held concurrently with the first five rounds of the Drivers Championship. The Drivers’ title was open to Group C Sports Cars, Group B GT Cars, Group 6 Two-Seater Racing Cars, Group 5 Special Production Cars, Group 4 GT Cars, Group 3 GT Cars, Group 2 Touring Cars and IMSA GTX, GTO and GTU cars. The Manufacturers title was limited to Group C Sports Cars and Group B GT Cars only. The series ran from 18 April 1982 to 17 October 1982.

The World Endurance Championship for Drivers was won by Jacky Ickx driving a Porsche 956 and the World Endurance Championship for Manufacturers was awarded to Porsche.

== Schedule ==
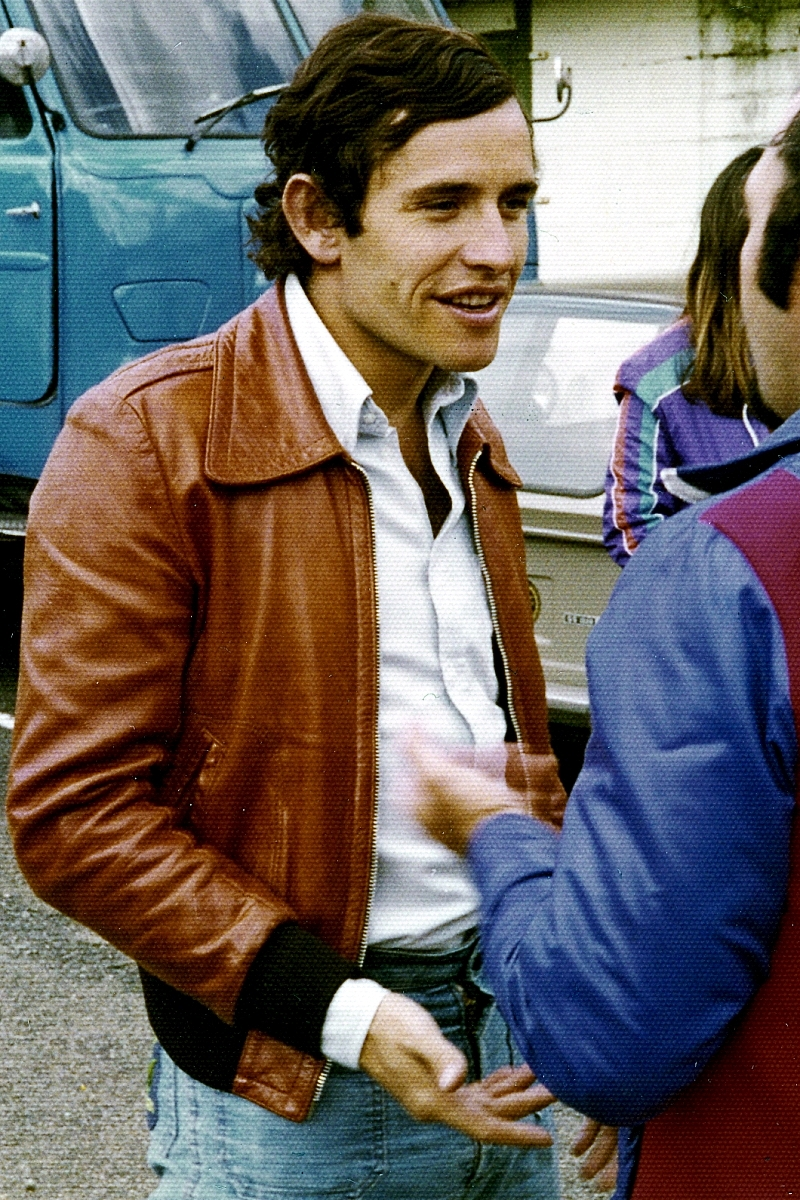
Drivers Championship winner Jacky Ickx, pictured in 1975

Rnd	Race	Circuit	Date
1	(Italy) Trofeo Filippo Caracciolo (1000 km)	Autodromo Nazionale Monza	18 April
2	(United Kingdom) The Pace Petroleum 6 Hours	Silverstone Circuit	16 May
3	(Germany) Rudolf Caracciola Wanderpreis 1000 Kilometres	Nürburgring	30 May
4	(France) 24 Hours of Le Mans	Circuit de la Sarthe	19 June; 20 June
5	(Belgium) Trophee Diners Club 1000 Kilometres	Circuit de Spa-Francorchamps	5 September
6	(Italy) Trofeo Banca Toscana 1000 Kilometres^{†}	Mugello Circuit	19 September
7	WEC in Japan (6 Hours)^{†}	Fuji Speedway	3 October
8	(United Kingdom) Shell Oils 1000 Kilometres^{†}	Brands Hatch	17 October

† - Points were awarded for the World Endurance Championship for Drivers only.

== Season results ==
=== Races ===
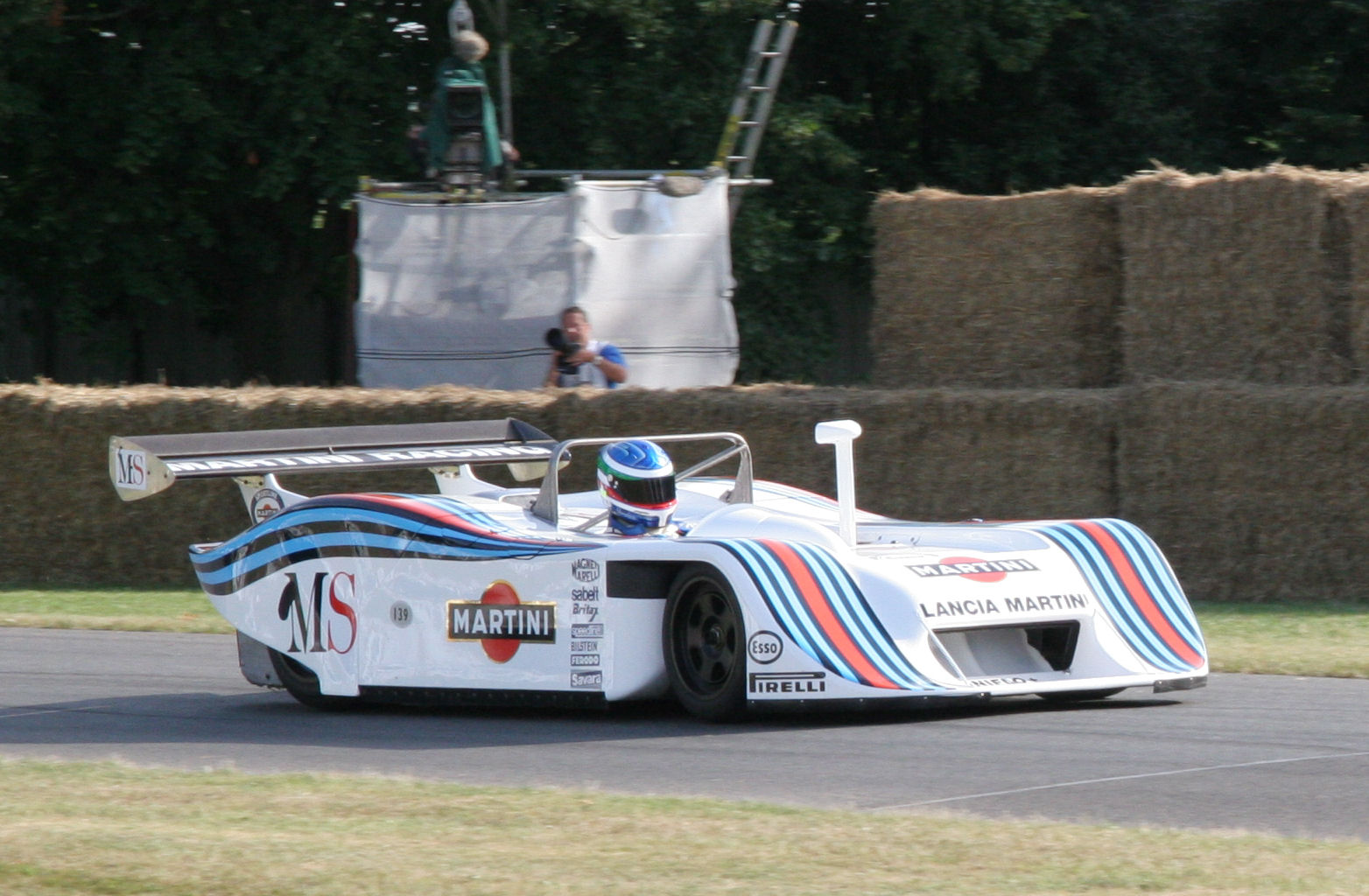
The Martini Racing Lancia LC1s were victorious in three of the eight championship races

Rnd	Circuit	Winning team Winning Car	Results
Rnd	Circuit	Winning drivers	Results
1	Monza	(France) Automobiles Jean Rondeau (France) Rondeau M382 Ford	Results
1	Monza	(France) Henri Pescarolo (Italy) Giorgio Francia	Results
2	Silverstone	(Italy) Martini Racing (Italy) Lancia LC1	Results
2	Silverstone	(Italy) Michele Alboreto (Italy) Riccardo Patrese	Results
3	Nürburgring	(Italy) Martini Racing (Italy) Lancia LC1	Results
3	Nürburgring	(Italy) Michele Alboreto (Italy) Riccardo Patrese (Italy) Teo Fabi	Results
4	La Sarthe	(Germany) Rothmans Porsche (Germany) Porsche 956	Results
4	La Sarthe	(Belgium) Jacky Ickx (United Kingdom) Derek Bell	Results
5	Spa-Francorchamps	(Germany) Rothmans Porsche (Germany) Porsche 956	Results
5	Spa-Francorchamps	(Belgium) Jacky Ickx (Germany) Jochen Mass	Results
6	Mugello	(Italy) Martini Racing (Italy) Lancia LC1	Results
6	Mugello	(Italy) Piercarlo Ghinzani (Italy) Michele Alboreto	Results
7	Fuji	(Germany) Rothmans Porsche (Germany) Porsche 956	Results
7	Fuji	(Belgium) Jacky Ickx (Germany) Jochen Mass	Results
8	Brands Hatch	(Germany) Rothmans Porsche (Germany) Porsche 956	Results
8	Brands Hatch	(Belgium) Jacky Ickx (United Kingdom) Derek Bell	Results

== Drivers Championship ==
Points towards the 1982 World Endurance Championship for Drivers were awarded on a 20-15-12-10-8-6-4-3-2-1 basis to drivers of the ten top placed cars at each round, regardless of class. Bonus points were also awarded to the drivers of those cars on the following basis:

- 0 points to Category I (Group C, Group 5 over 2000cc, IMSA GTX over 2000cc)
- 1 point to Category II (Group B over 2000cc, Group 6 under 2000cc, Group 5 under 2000cc, Group 4 over 2000cc, IMSA GTO)
- 2 points to Category III (IMSA GTU, Group 2 over 2000cc, Group 3 over 2000cc)
- 3 points to Category IV (Group B under 2000cc, Group 4 under 2000cc, Group 2 under 2000cc, Group 3 under 2000cc).

Only the best six round results could be retained by each driver. Any driver transferring between cars during a race was ineligible to score points and a driver was required to complete at least 30 percent of the car's distance to be awarded points.

Belgian driver Jacky Ickx won the title at the wheel of a Porsche 956 entered by Rothmans Porsche.

Position	Driver	Car	Mon	Sil	Nur	Le M	Spa	Mug	Fuj	Br H	Total
1	Jacky Ickx	Porsche 956	-	15	-	20	20	-	20	20	95
2	Riccardo Patrese	Lancia LC1	-	21	21	-	13	-	16	16	87
3	Derek Bell	Porsche 956	-	15	-	20	15	-	-	20	70
4	Teo Fabi	Lancia LC1	-	-	21	-	13	-	16	16	66
5	Michele Alboreto	Lancia LC1	-	21	21	-	-	21	-	-	63
6	Henri Pescarolo	Rondeau M382 Ford & Porsche 936C	20	8	15	-	3	12	-	3	61
7	Jochen Mass	Porsche 956	-	-	-	15	20	-	20	-	55
8	Giorgio Francia	Rondeau M382 Ford & Osella PA9 BMW	20	11	-	-	7	11	-	-	49
9	Rolf Stommelen	Porsche 935 K3 & Rondeau M382 Ford	15	-	15	-	-	-	-	-	30
=	Vern Schuppan	Porsche 956	-	-	-	15	15	-	-	-	30
11	Jean-Michel Martin	Porsche 936C	-	12	-	-	10	-	-	-	22
=	Philippe Martin	Porsche 936C	-	12	-	-	10	-	-	-	22
=	John Fitzpatrick	Porsche 935 K4	-	-	-	10	-	-	-	12	22
=	David Hobbs	Porsche 935 K4	-	-	-	10	-	-	-	12	22
15	Piercarlo Ghinzani	Lancia LC1	-	-	-	-	-	21	-	-	21
16	Luigi Moreschi	Osella PA9 BMW	-	-	-	-	7	11	-	-	18
17	Hans Heyer	Porsche 936C & Sauber SHS C6 Ford	-	-	-	-	2	12	-	3	17
18	Corrado Fabi	Lancia LC1	-	-	-	-	-	16	-	-	16
=	Alessandro Nannini	Lancia LC1	-	-	-	-	-	16	-	-	16
=	Gordon Spice	Rondeau M382 Ford	-	8	-	-	8	-	-	-	16

A total of 125 drivers scored points in the Drivers Championship.

== Manufacturers Championship ==
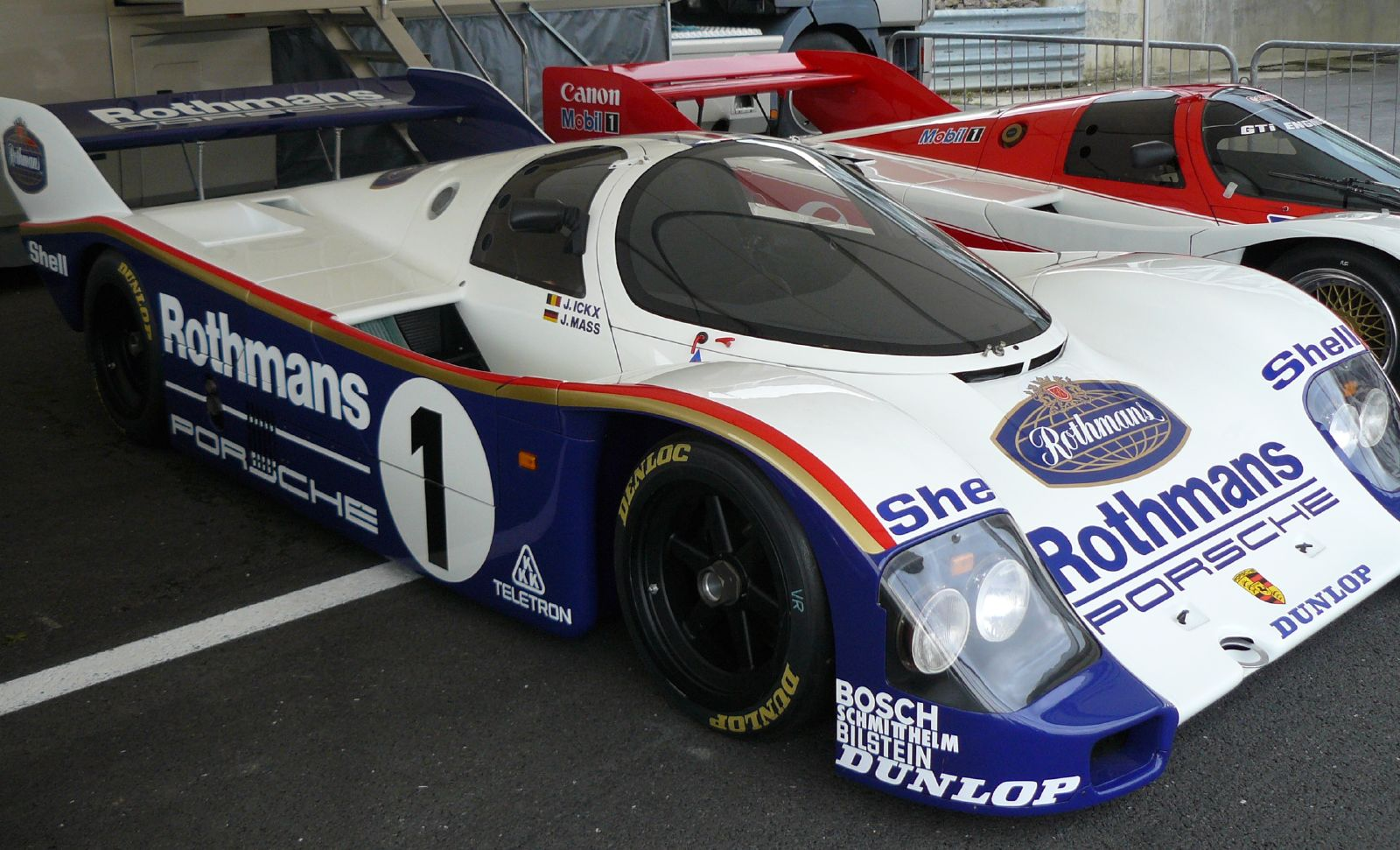
Porsche 956 - the principle model used by Porsche in its successful challenge for the 1982 World Endurance Championship for Manufacturers

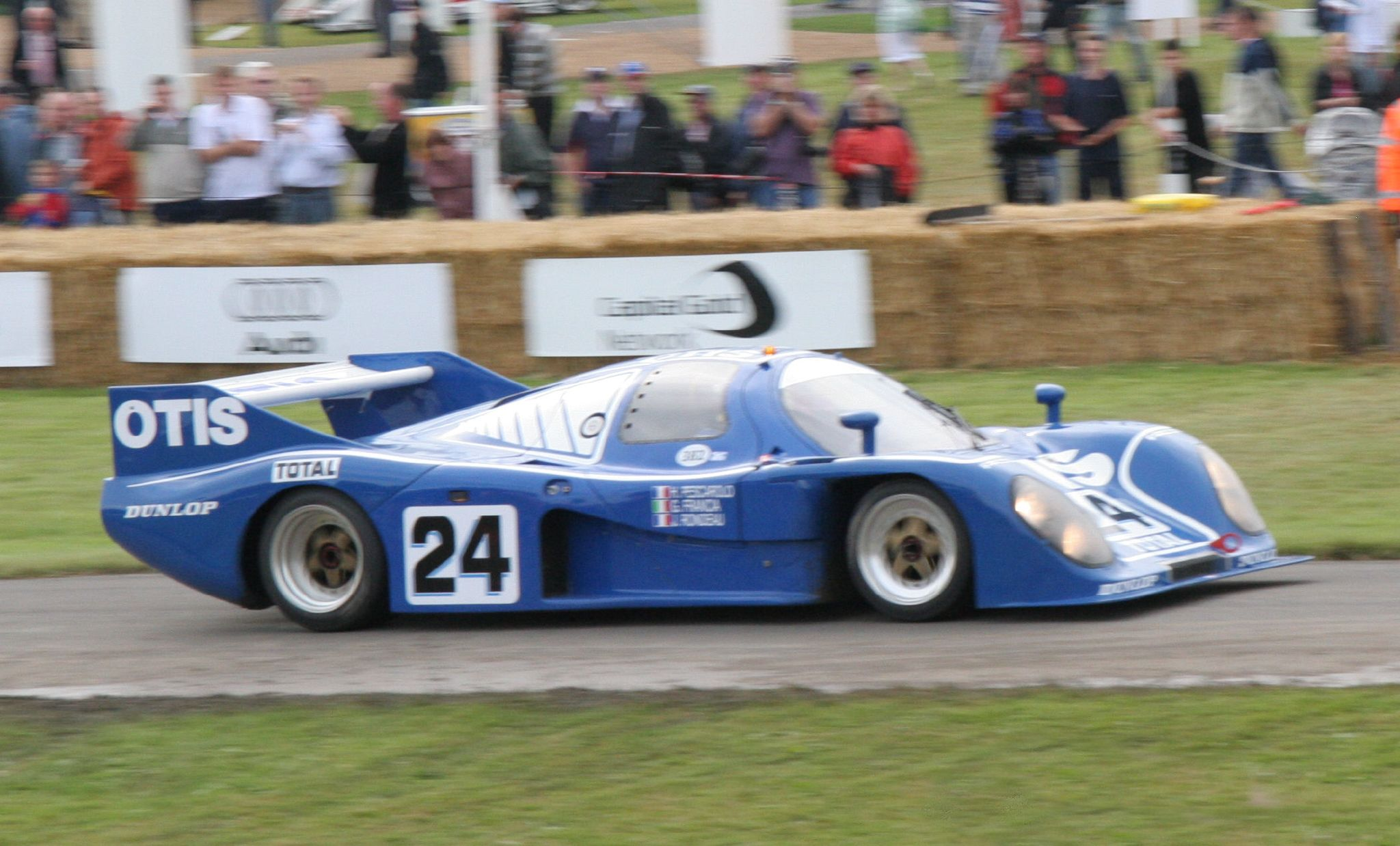
Ford - Rondeau placed second in the Manufacturers title with the Ford powered Rondeau M382

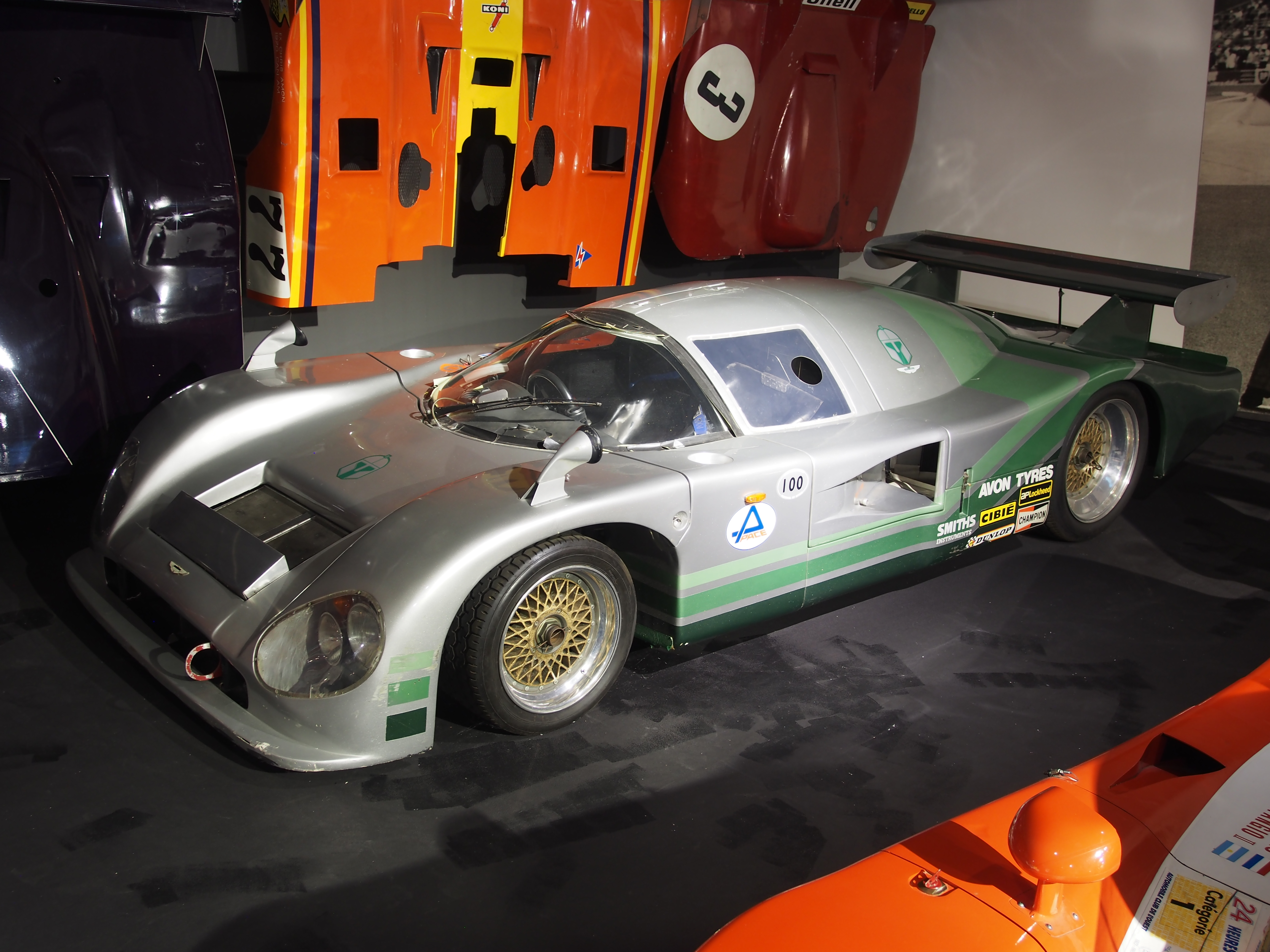
Aston Martin - Nimrod placed third with the Nimrod NRA/C2

Points towards the 1982 World Endurance Championship for Manufacturers were scored only by Group C and Group B cars on a 20-15-12-10-8-6-4-3-2-1 basis for the first ten finishers in these two classes combined. Only the best placed car from each manufacturer was eligible to score points and only the best four round results could be retained by each manufacturer.

Pos	Manufacturer	Mon	Sil	Nur	Le M	Spa	Total
1	Porsche		20	15	20	20	75
2	Ford - Rondeau	20	12	20	(8)	10	62
3	Aston Martin-Nimrod		10		10	4	24
4	Peugeot - WM	15	6				21
5	Ford		8			2	10
6	Ford - Sauber		4			6	10
7	Ford - Lola		3				3
8	Ford - Cougar					1	1

Note: The FIA awarded manufacturers placings to the combined engine/chassis unit. For cars competing with a different make of engine to that of the chassis, the FIA gave prominence to the engine over the chassis when naming a “Manufacturer”.

=== The cars ===
The following models contributed towards the net point scores of their respective manufacturers.

- Porsche 956 & Porsche 930
- Rondeau M382
- Nimrod NRA/C2
- WM P82
- Ford C100
- Sauber SHS C6
- Lola T610
- Cougar C01
