= Rondeau M382 =

French racing car

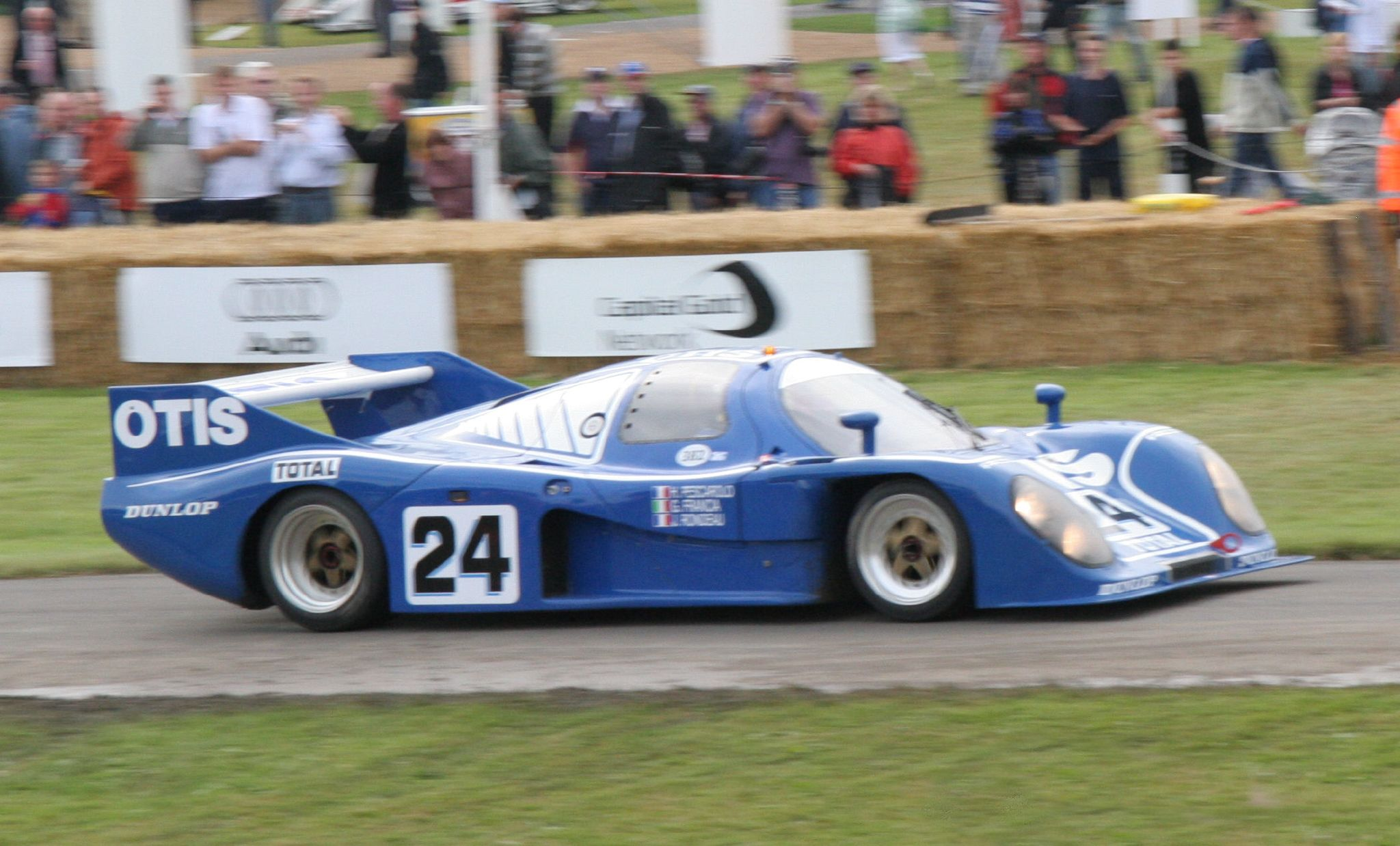
- Category: Group C
- Constructor: Rondeau
- Designer: Jean Rondeau
- Predecessor: Rondeau M379
- Successor: Rondeau M482

Technical specifications
- Engine: Ford-Cosworth DFV 3.0 L (183.1 cu in) V8, mid-engined

Competition history

The Rondeau M382 was a Group C prototype sports car, designed, developed and built by Automobiles Jean Rondeau in 1981, and used in sports car racing between 1982 and 1986.

== Development history and technology ==
Developed under the leadership of the French racing driver and racing car designer, the M382 was the first Rondeau to comply with the Group C technical regulations that came into force in 1982. Nevertheless, the M382 was largely based on the most successful Rondeau to date, the M379 model, with which Jean Rondeau was able to win the 1980 24 Hours of Le Mans together with Jean-Pierre Jaussaud. This was mainly for financial reasons, since the small racing team from France always had to budget with the financial means. The situation was made easier in autumn 1981 by the conclusion of purchase contracts for three chassis, which were delivered to three customer teams at the beginning of 1982.

Unlike the M379, the M382 had a longer wheelbase, new rear suspension, larger front, and rear brakes, and an aerodynamically improved rear end. Rondeau installed the 3.3-liter DFL V8 engine from Cosworth in the customer cars, which was also used in some works applications. At Le Mans, the works cars were upgraded to the more powerful 3.9-liter version of the DFL engine. It was also powered by a 5.4 L (330 cu in) Chevrolet small-block V8 engine.

== Racing history ==
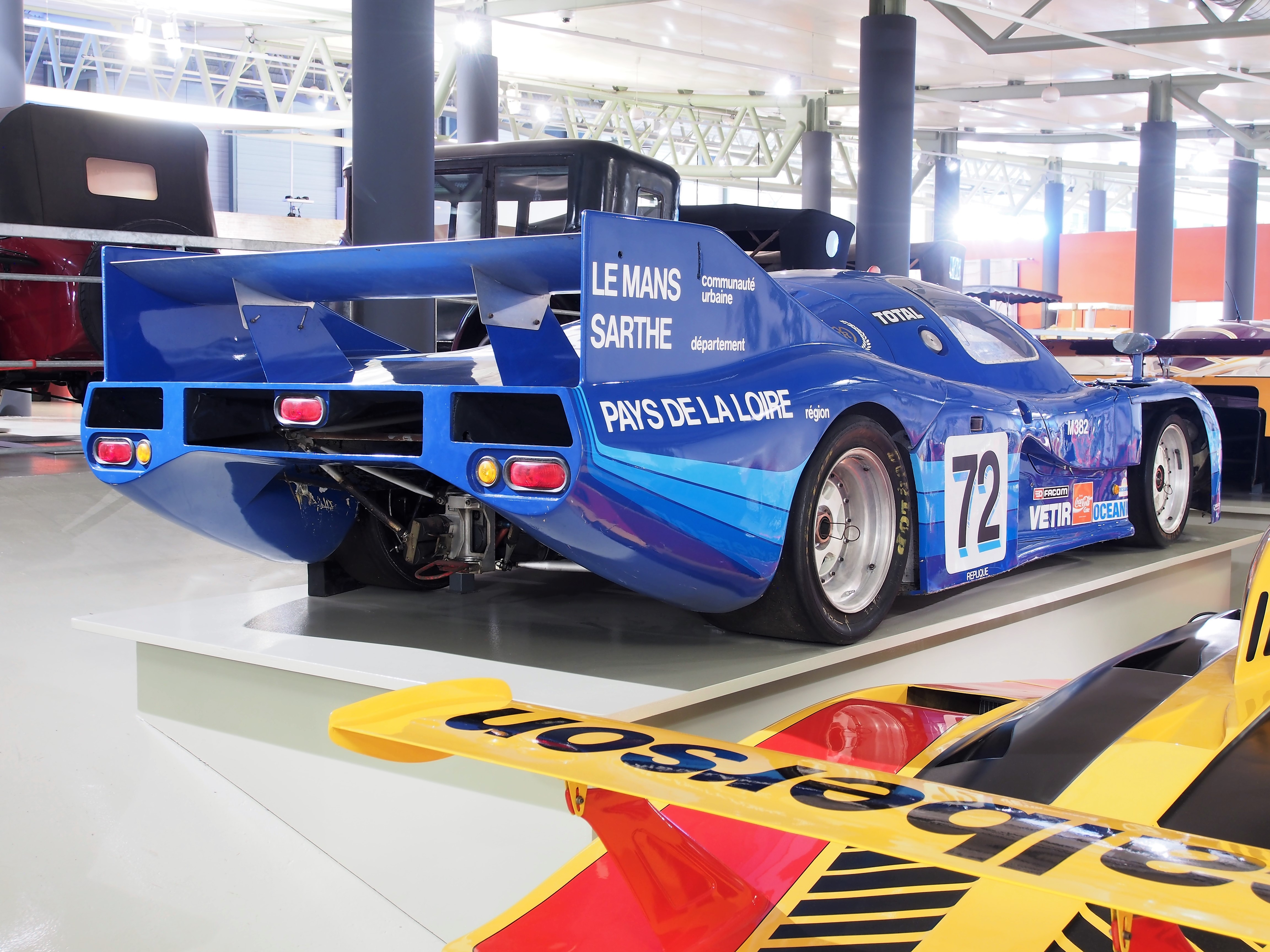
Rear view of a M382

By the beginning of 1982, four chassis had been completed. Two vehicles - chassis numbers 001 and 002 - were delivered to North America. Belcher Racing and Golden Eagle Racing used the cars in the IMSA GTP series. Chassis 003 was acquired by the French racing driver and racing team owner Christian Bussi. Chassis 004 remained with Rondeau.

The M382 made its racing debut in late January 1982 at the 24 Hours of Daytona. The two vehicles only arrived in the USA just before the race event, leaving the two teams little time for preparing for the race and for the race set-up. Both cars fell far short of expectations. Entered by Golden Eagle Racing and driven by Bill Knoll, Irv Hoerr, and Skeeter McKitterick, the car only managed the 13th practice time; the Belcher Racing M382, driven by Danny Sullivan, Gary Belcher, and Hubert Phippsplaced one rank behind. With a pole position time of 1.43.891, both cars were more than nine seconds short of the fastest practice time set by Bobby Rahal on a March 82G. During the race, both cars were repeatedly forced to make unscheduled stops in the pits due to a number of technical shortcomings. Both vehicles were rated, but were no longer in the race at the end of the race.

The racing debut of the M382 in Europe and the 1982 World Endurance Championship ran completely contrary to the race in Daytona. At the 1000 km race in Monza, Henri Pescarolo qualified the works car in pole position and also won the race with teammate Giorgio Francia.

While there were almost no racing successes in the IMSA GTP series - it was only in July 1982 that Skeeter McKitterick was able to place an M382 in the top three with third place overall in the 100-mile race at Sears Point - the works car counted in the sports car World Championship for the fastest and most successful vehicles in the field. After finishing second overall in the 1000 km race at the Nürburgring (driving Henri Pescarolo and Rolf Stommelen ), fifth in the 6 Hours of Silverstone (Pescarolo and Gordon Spice ) and fifth overall in the 1000 km race of Spa Francorchamps ( François Migaultand Spice) Rondeau seemed certain of the overall victory in the one-make cup of the sports car world championship. The ninth overall place of the Porsche 930 reported as a Group B vehicle by Fritz Müller and Georg Memminger in the 1000 km race at the Nürburgring gave Porsche an additional 15 points after a protest and thus overall victory in the manufacturers' world championship. A counter-protest by Jean Rondeau was unsuccessful, after which the enraged Frenchman announced his factory withdrawal from the World Endurance Championship, both as team boss and driver.

Only at the 24 Hours of Le Mans, where the works cars failed in 1982 and 1983, did Rondeau continue to drive.

In 1983, in addition to the completely redesigned M482, three more chassis were built and delivered. The best placement of an M382 in the following years was the seventh place (chassis 005) by Pierre Yver and Bernard de Dryver at the 1000 km race of Monza in 1984.
