= Rondeau M378 =

French racing car

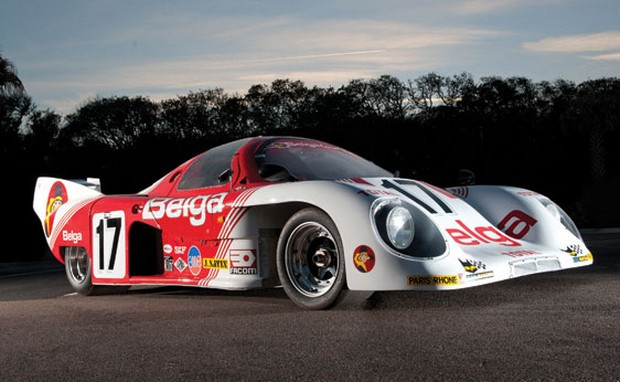
- Category: Group 6
- Constructor: Rondeau
- Designer: Jean Rondeau
- Predecessor: Inaltéra GTP
- Successor: Rondeau M379

Technical specifications
- Engine: Ford-Cosworth DFV 3.0 L (183.1 cu in) V8, mid-engined
- Power: 460 hp (340 kW)
- Weight: 760 kg (1,675.5 lb)

Competition history

The Rondeau M378 is a Group 6 sports prototype race car, designed, developed and built by Automobiles Jean Rondeau, in 1978, and was their second car. It competed in one World Sportscar Championship sports car racing event; the 1978 24 Hours of Le Mans. It was driven by Bernard Darniche, Jacky Haran, Jean Rondeau (racing driver), and its best result was a 9th-place finish at that year's event. It was powered by a 3.0 L (180 cu in), 460 hp (340 kW), Ford-Cosworth DFV V8 Formula One engine.The chassis is an aluminum-reinforced steel spaceframe, covered in a fiberglass panel body. This drove the rear wheels through a Hewland 5-speed manual transmission. This meant it was very light, with the total weight coming to 760 kg (1,680 lb).

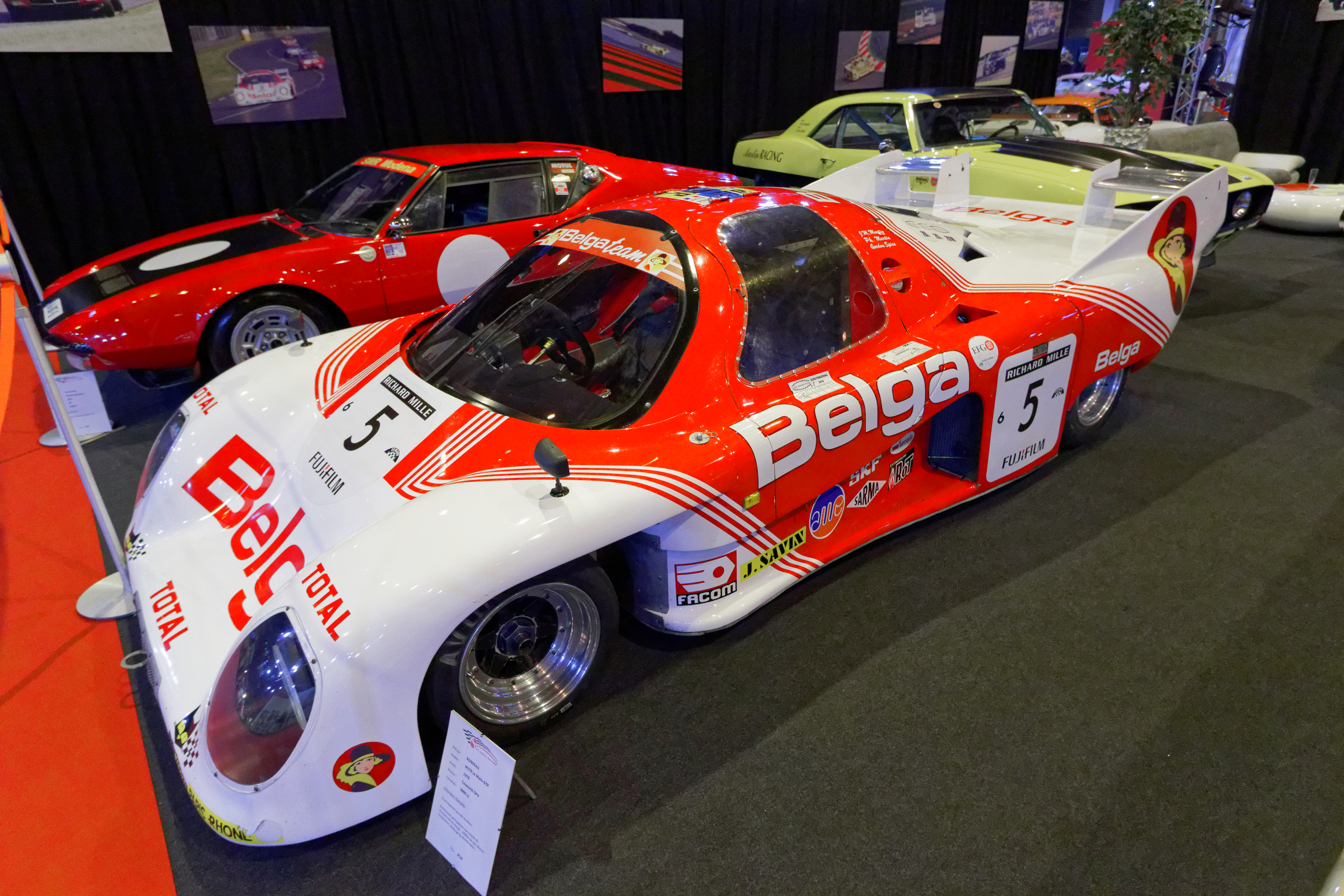

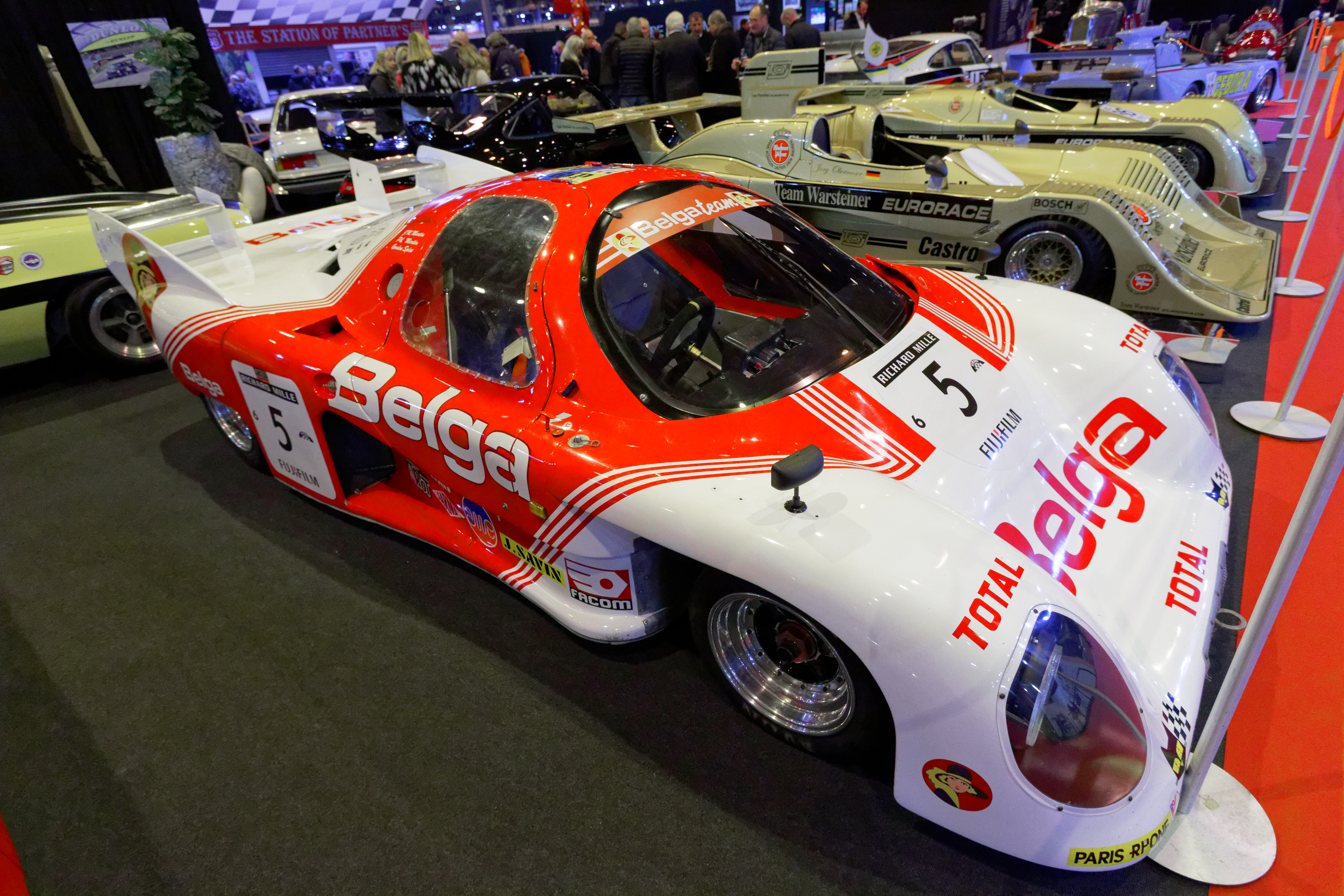

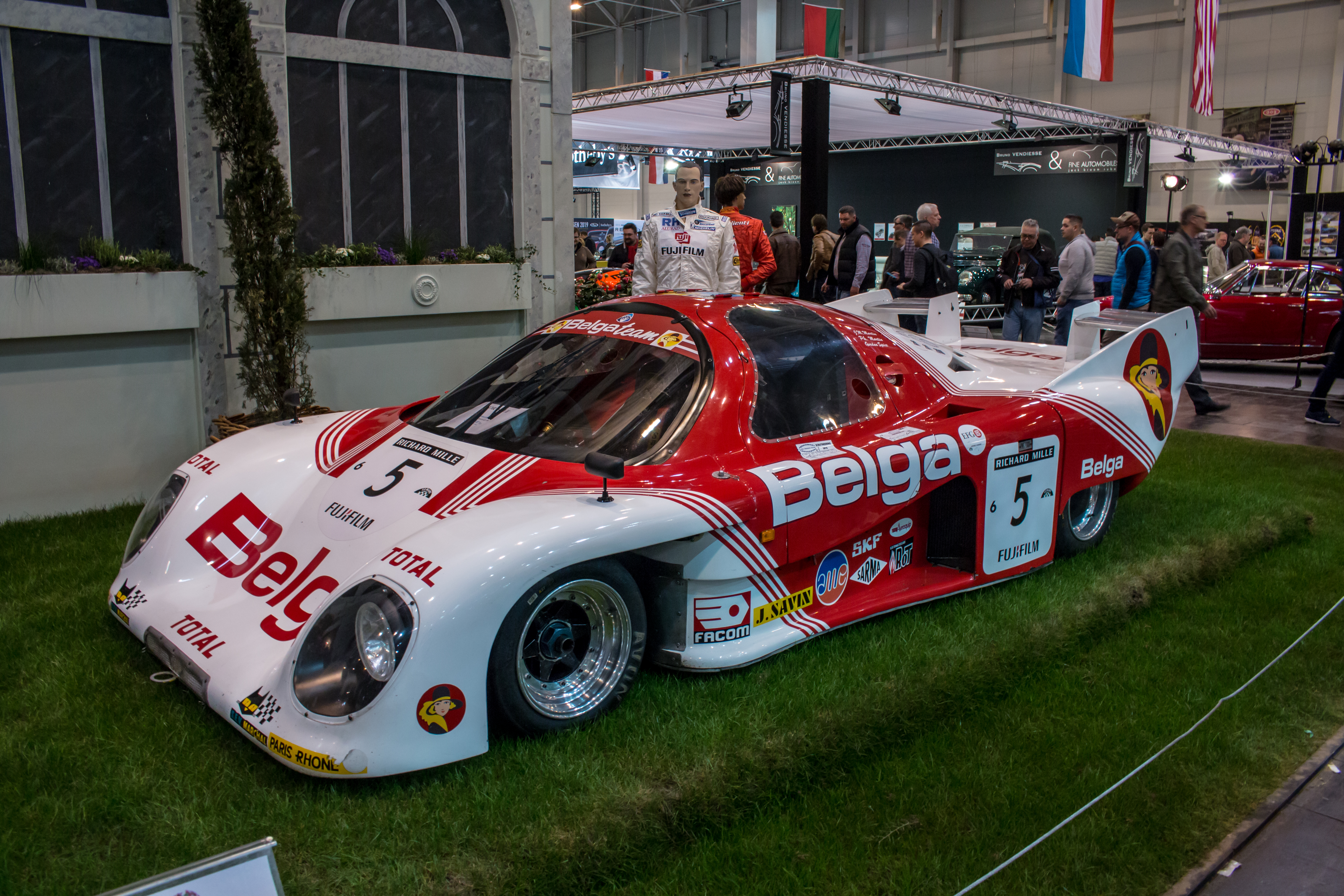

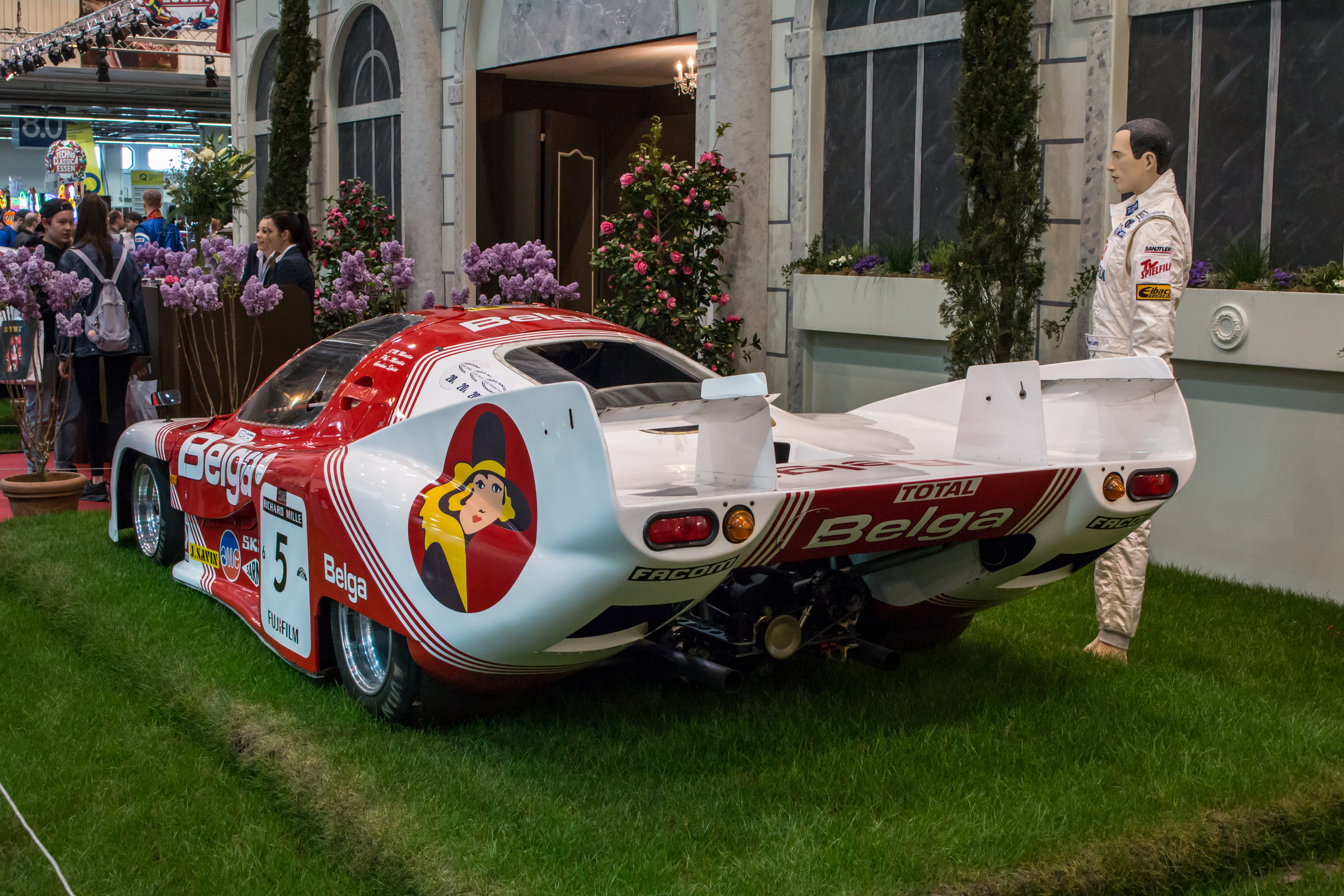
