= Rondeau M482 =

French racing car

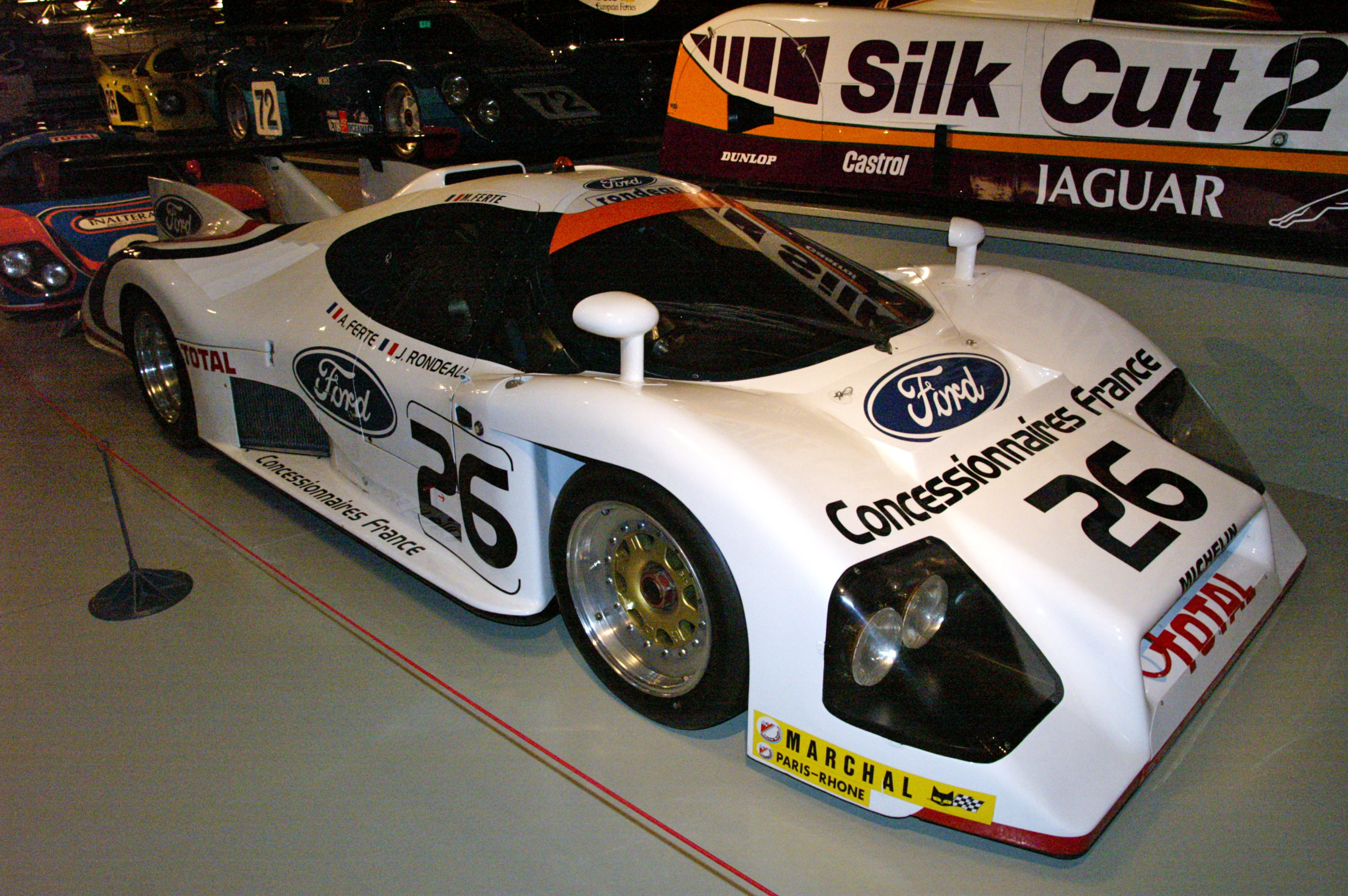
- Category: Group C
- Constructor: Rondeau
- Designers: Don Foster, Max Sardou
- Predecessor: Rondeau M382

Technical specifications
- Engine: Ford-Cosworth DFV 3.9 L (238.0 cu in) V8, mid-engined

Competition history

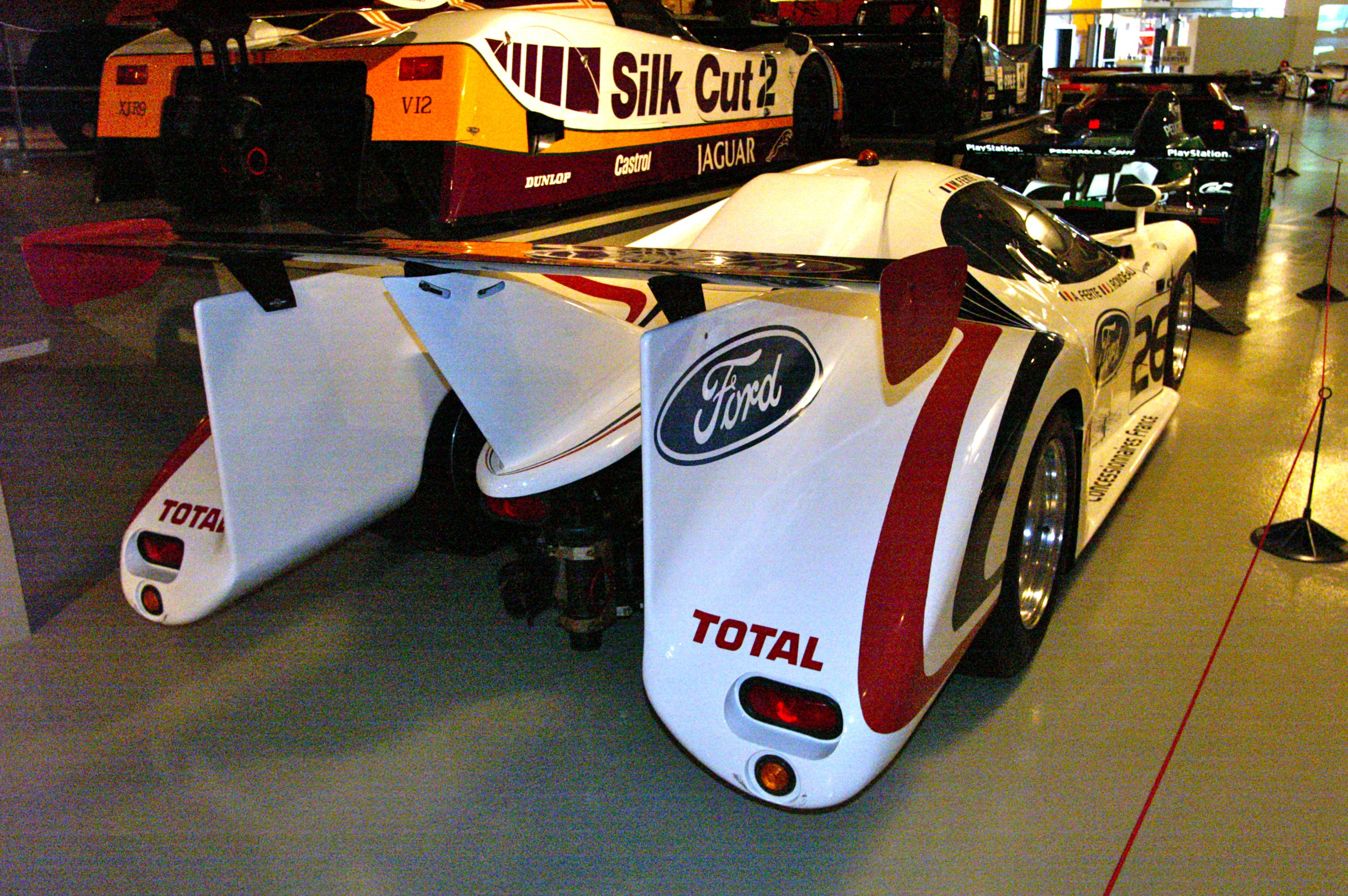
Rear view of a M482

The Rondeau M482 was a Group C sports car prototype designed, developed and built by Automobiles Jean Rondeau in 1982, and used in sports car racing until 1987.

== Development history and technology ==
In 1982, a team of engineers led by Jean Rondeau developed the first true Group C Rondeau, the M482. The previous model, the M382, was largely based on the most successful Rondeau type, the M379. While Don Foster designed a new chassis, the French racing car designer and aerodynamicist Max Sardou designed a very round, almost voluminous body. A special feature of the racing car was the rear. In a so-called Venturi channel, the Venturi effect should be used to provide more downforce on the rear axle. As innovative as the car seemed at first glance, it was badly designed. In order to make the large tunnel possible, the exhaust pipe was routed past the radiators on the left and right of the car. Due to this design, the function of the cooler was largely restricted, which led to constant overheating of the engines. A heat shield placed between the exhaust pipes and the radiator could alleviate the problems, but never eliminated them.

The 3.9 L (240 cu in) Cosworth DFL V8 engine was used as the engine. Even during the test drives, the wear, and tear on the robust aggregates was high; a circumstance that did not become less in racing.

== Racing history ==
The M482 had its first racing use in 1982. Jean Rondeau and François Migault drove chassis 001 at the 6 Hours of Silverstone. The duo already experienced a fiasco in training. The fastest in qualifying, Jacky Ickx, in the works Porsche 956, who achieved a pole position time of 1.16.910, was 16 seconds ahead. The works M382 with Henri Pescarolo at the wheel was faster by 12 seconds and even Christian Bussi's private M382 was more than a second quicker per lap. In the race, an early end came after 60 laps due to suspension damage. This was to be the M482's only result during 1982.

At the end of the 1982 sports car season, Jean Rondeau had withdrawn from sports car racing at the factory. In addition to disputes with the FIA, a lack of financial resources was a second reason for ending motorsport in this form.

Ford France acquired the three existing chassis in early 1983 to run the cars in that year's 24 Hours of Le Mans. The engagement turned into a disaster. Even in training, the M482s were far too slow on the long straights due to the high ground effect on the rear axle. All three cars retired early in the race. Jean-Pierre Jaussaud and Philippe Streiff's car had an irreparable oil leak after just twelve laps. The vehicle of Jean Rondeau and the Ferté brothers Alain and Michel stopped after ninety laps with engine failure, and Henri Pescarolo and Thierry Boutsen ended their race after 174 laps; also due to an engine failure.

Ford sold the three chassis to private teams at the end of the year. At least one M482 was at Le Mans every year until 1987. The last appearance also ensures the best placement in the overall classification. In 1987 Jean-Philippe Grand, Gaston Rahier, and Jacques Terrien finished twelfth in the Graff Racing and entered 001 chassis, albeit 95 laps down on the winning Porsche 962C of Hans-Joachim Stuck, Derek Bell, and Al Holbert.
