= Jean Ragnotti =

French rally driver (born 1945)

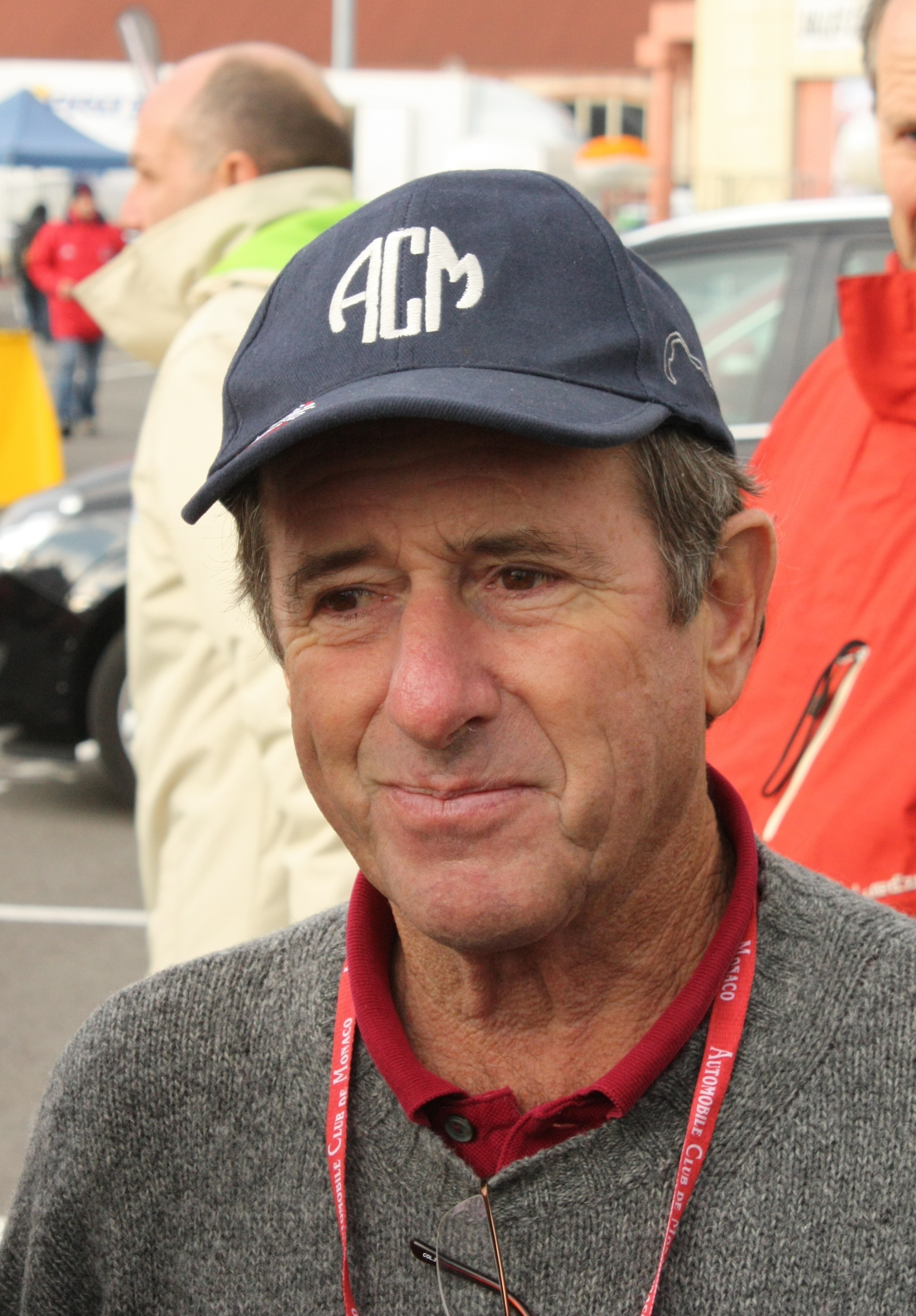
- Ragnotti at the 2011 Monte Carlo Rally

Personal information
- Nationality: (France) French
- Born: 29 August 1945 (age 81); Pernes-les-Fontaines

World Rally Championship record
- Years active: 1973 – 1987, 1990 – 1995
- Co-driver: (France) Jacques Jaubert (France) Pierre Thimonier (France) Jean-Marc Andrié (United Kingdom) Martin Holmes (France) Gilles Thimonier
- Teams: Renault
- Rallies: 41
- Championships: 0
- Rally wins: 3
- Podiums: 9
- Stage wins: 90
- Total points: 190
- First rally: 1973 Monte Carlo Rally
- First win: 1981 Monte Carlo Rally
- Last win: 1985 Tour de Corse
- Last rally: 1995 Tour de Corse

Jean "Jeannot" Ragnotti (born 29 August 1945 in Pernes-les-Fontaines, Vaucluse), is a French former rally driver for Renault in the World Rally Championship.

Ranking among his achievements are his conquering of the Monte Carlo Rally in 1981, what was the first turbo victory in the history of the WRC, alongside compatriot Jean-Marc Andrié against the might of the ultimate four-wheel-drive upstart, the Audi Quattro. In the following season, he took his Renault 5 Turbo to victory at the Tour de Corse. Jean Marc Andrie later committed suicide in 1999. The Maxi version of the same Renault 5 was to reign again on the asphalt stages of European rallying, when in 1985, Ragnotti claimed the Tour de Corse again with Group B rallying at its zenith; a win that came on debut of Renault 5 Maxi Turbo. His co-driver by that time was Pierre Thimonier (whose son Gilles would also be a co-driver for Jean Ragnotti). Pierre Thimonier died of cancer in 2008. The 1985 Rothmans Tour de Corse would also prove to be a tragic affair after the fatal crash of Attilio Bettega on SS4 (Zerubia) of the event.

In the 1990s, Ragnotti continued to drive for Renault, this time in their front-wheel drive Clio Maxi.

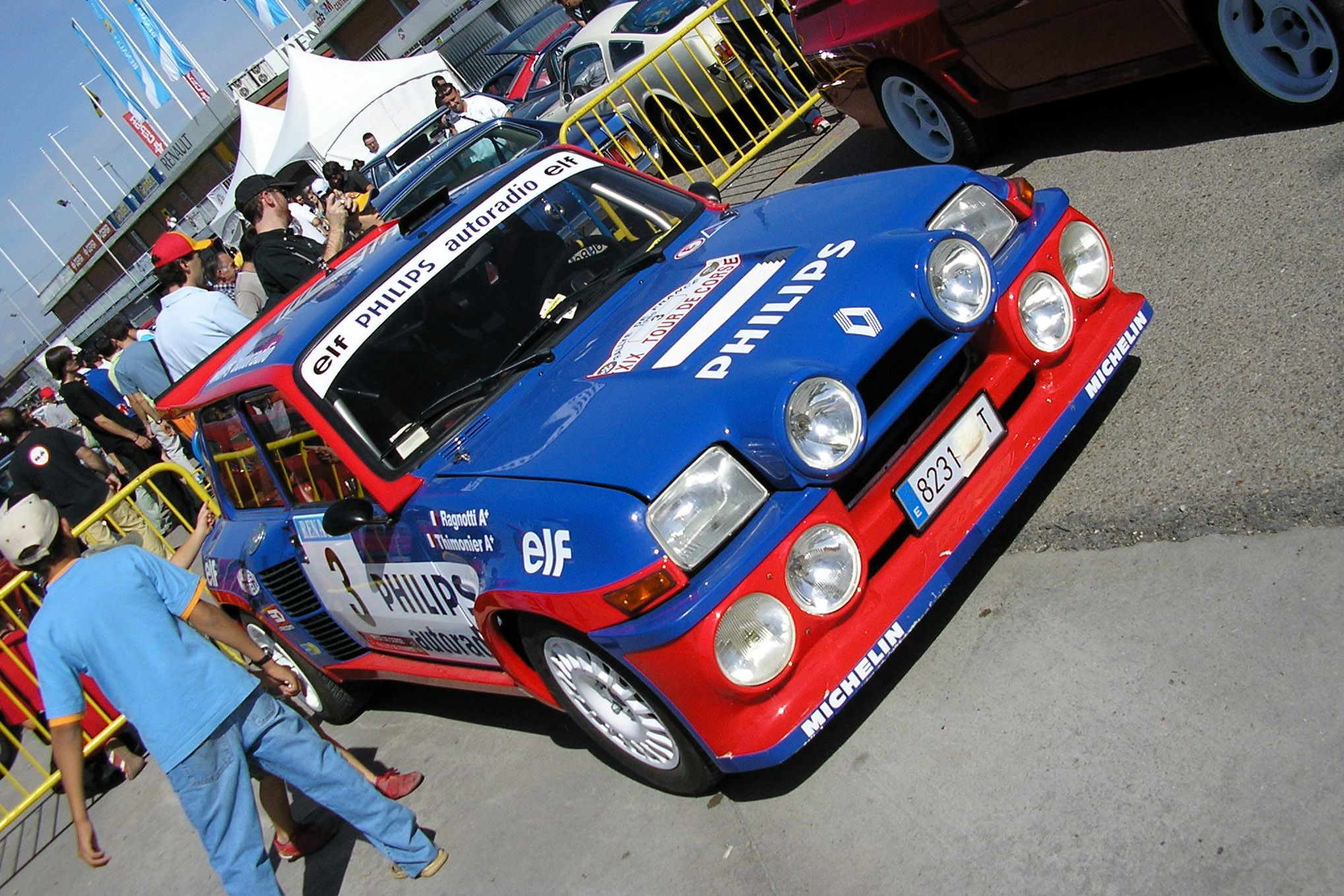
Ragnotti's Renault 5 Maxi Turbo.

== WRC victories ==
#	Event	Season	Co-driver	Car
1	(Monaco) 49ème Rallye Automobile de Monte-Carlo	1981	Jean-Marc Andrié	Renault 5 Turbo
2	26ème Tour de Corse - Rallye de France	1982	Jean-Marc Andrié	Renault 5 Turbo
3	29ème Tour de Corse - Rallye de France	1985	Pierre Thimonier	Renault 5 Maxi Turbo

== Complete 24 Hours of Le Mans results ==
Year	Team	Co-drivers	Car	Class	Laps	Pos.	Class pos.
1975	(France) P. Mettetal	(France) Michel Lateste	Tecma 755-Ford-Hart	S 2.0	11	DNF	DNF
1977	(France) Inaltéra	(France) Jean Rondeau	Inaltéra LM77-Cosworth	GTP	315	4th	1st
1978	(France) Renault Sport (France) Écurie Calberson	(France) José Dolhem (France) Guy Fréquelin (France) Jean-Pierre Jabouille	Renault Alpine A442A	Gr. 6 S 3.0	358	4th	4th
1979	(France) Jean Rondeau	(France) Bernard Darniche	Rondeau M379-Cosworth	Gr. 6 S 3.0	292	5th	1st
1980	(France) Jean Rondeau	(France) Henri Pescarolo	Rondeau M379B-Cosworth	Gr. 6 S 3.0	124	DNF	DNF
1981	(France) Jean Rondeau	(France) Jean-Louis Lafosse	Rondeau M379C-Cosworth	Gr. 6 S +2.0	28	DNF	DNF
1982	(France) Automobiles Jean Rondeau	(France) Henri Pescarolo (France) Jean Rondeau	Rondeau M382-Cosworth	Gr. C	146	DNF	DNF

Sporting positions
Preceded by Érik Comas	French Touring Car Champion; 1988	Succeeded by Jean-Pierre Malcher
