= Jean-Pierre Jaussaud =

French racing driver (1937–2021)

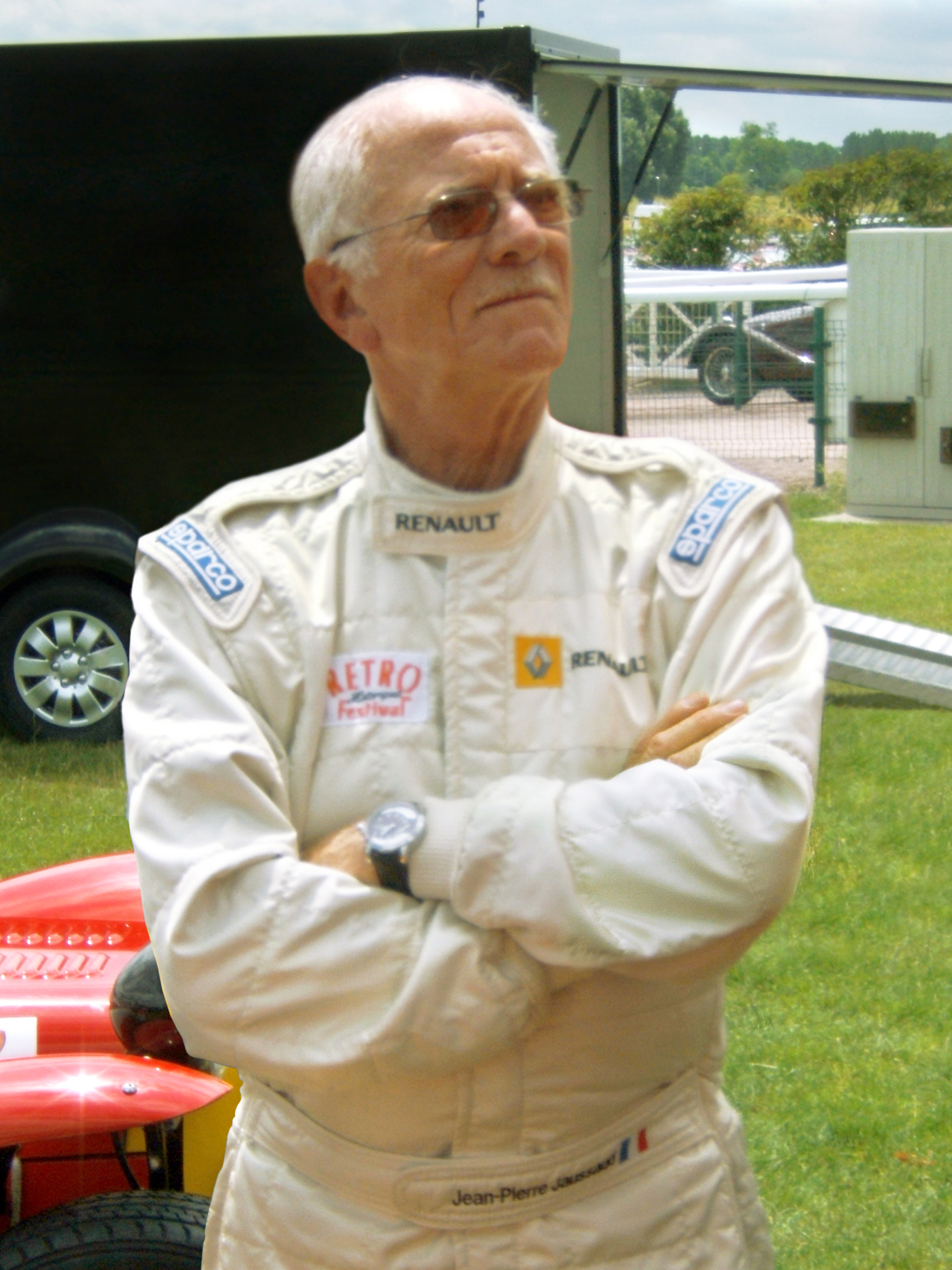
- Jaussaud in 2009
- Nationality: (France) French
- Born: Jean-Pierre Gérard Jaussaud; 3 June 1937 Caen, France
- Died: 22 July 2021 (aged 84) Caen, France

Championship titles
- 1970: French Formula Three

24 Hours of Le Mans career
- Years: 1966–1967, 1973–1983
- Teams: Matra, Renault, Mirage, Rondeau,
- Best finish: First 1978 and 1980
- Class wins: 1978 and 1980

Jean-Pierre Gérard Jaussaud (3 June 1937 – 22 July 2021) was a French racing driver, noted for winning the 24 Hours of Le Mans in 1978 and 1980.

Jaussaud was born in Caen, Calvados, and started racing in automobiles in 1962, taking courses in the Jim Russell Drivers School and the Winfield Racing School. In 1964, he graduated to Formula Three racing, with backing from Shell, and joined the works Matra team in 1966, where he stayed for two years, and won the French title in 1970, in a private Tecno.

In 1971, Jaussaud moved full-time to Formula Two in a works March, and the following year drove a privateer Brabham and fought for the European Formula 2 title with Mike Hailwood. In 1975, Jaussaud quit single-seaters and entered endurance racing, where he was invited to drive for Renault Sport starting in 1976. Two years later, Jaussaud and partner Didier Pironi won the 24 Hours of Le Mans race overall.

Although he tested the Renault F1 car, Jaussaud instead stayed in touring cars and endurance, winning the 1979 Production title in a Triumph Dolomite. Teaming up with Jean Rondeau, he won at Le Mans once more, and also took part in the Paris-Dakar Rally for Rondeau's team. Jaussaud continued racing until 1992, when he retired to become a racing instructor. Jaussaud died in Caen on 22 July 2021 at the age of 84.

== 24 Hours of Le Mans results ==
Year	Team	Co-Drivers	Car	Class	Laps	Pos.	Class Pos.
1966	(France) Matra Sports SARL	(France) Henri Pescarolo	Matra MS620 - BRM	P 2.0	38	DNF	DNF
1967	(France) Matra Sports SARL	(France) Henri Pescarolo	Matra MS630 - BRM	P 2.0	55	DNF	DNF
1973	(France) Equipe Matra-Simca Shell	(France) Jean-Pierre Jabouille	Matra-Simca MS670B	S 3.0	331	3rd	3rd
1974	(France) Equipe Matra-Simca Gitanes	(France) Bob Wollek (France) José Dolhem	Matra-Simca MS670B	S 3.0		DNF	DNF
1975	(United Kingdom) Gulf Research Racing Co.	(Australia) Vern Schuppan	Mirage-Ford GR8	S 3.0	330	3rd	3rd
1976	(France) Inaltéra	(Belgium) Christine Beckers (France) Jean Rondeau	Inaltéra-Ford LM76	GTP	264	21st	3rd
1977	(France) Équipe Renault Elf	(France) Patrick Tambay	Renault Alpine A442	S 3.0	158	DNF	DNF
1978	(France) Équipe Renault Elf	(France) Didier Pironi	Renault Alpine A442B	S 3.0	369	1st	1st
1979	(United States) Grand Touring Cars Ltd. Ford Concessionaires France	(Australia) Vern Schuppan (United Kingdom) David Hobbs	Mirage M10	S 3.0	121	NC	NC
1980	(France) LePoint Jean Rondeau	(France) Jean Rondeau	Rondeau M379	S 3.0	338	1st	1st
1981	(France) Otis Jean Rondeau	(France) Jean Rondeau	Rondeau M379	S 3.0	58	DNF	DNF
1982	(France) Otis Jean Rondeau	(France) Jean Rondeau	Rondeau M382	C	111	DNF	DNF
1983	(France) Otis Jean Rondeau	(France) Philippe Streiff	Rondeau M482	C	12	DNF	DNF

Sporting positions
Preceded by Henri Pescarolo	Monaco Formula Three; Race Winner; 1968	Succeeded by Ronnie Peterson
Preceded by François Mazet	French Formula Three; Champion; 1970	Succeeded by Patrick Depailler
Preceded by Jacky Ickx; Hurley Haywood; Jürgen Barth	Winner of the 24 Hours of Le Mans; 1978 with: Didier Pironi	Succeeded by Klaus Ludwig; Bill Whittington; Don Whittington
Preceded by Klaus Ludwig; Bill Whittington; Don Whittington	Winner of the 24 Hours of Le Mans; 1980 with: Jean Rondeau	Succeeded by Jacky Ickx; Derek Bell
