= Jacky Haran =

French racing driver (1943–2026)

- Born: 12 May 1943; Mansigné, German-occupied France
- Died: 16 June 2026 (aged 83); Coulaines, France
- Occupation: Racing driver

Jacky Haran (French: [ʒakˈi aʁˈɑ̃]; 12 May 1943 – 16 June 2026) was a French racing driver.

Haran began his career with Formula Renault and subsequently appeared in the 24 Hours of Le Mans on several occasions, achieving his best result of second place in 1981 in a Rondeau M379.

Haran died in Coulaines on 16 June 2026, at the age of 83.
