= Jean Rondeau (racing driver) =

French racing driver

- Nationality: (France) French
- Born: Jean Jacques Fernand Rondeau; 13 May 1946 Le Mans, France
- Died: 27 December 1985 (aged 39) Champagné, France

24 Hours of Le Mans career
- Years: 1972, 1974-1985
- Best finish: 1st (1980)
- Class wins: 3 (1977, 1978, 1980)

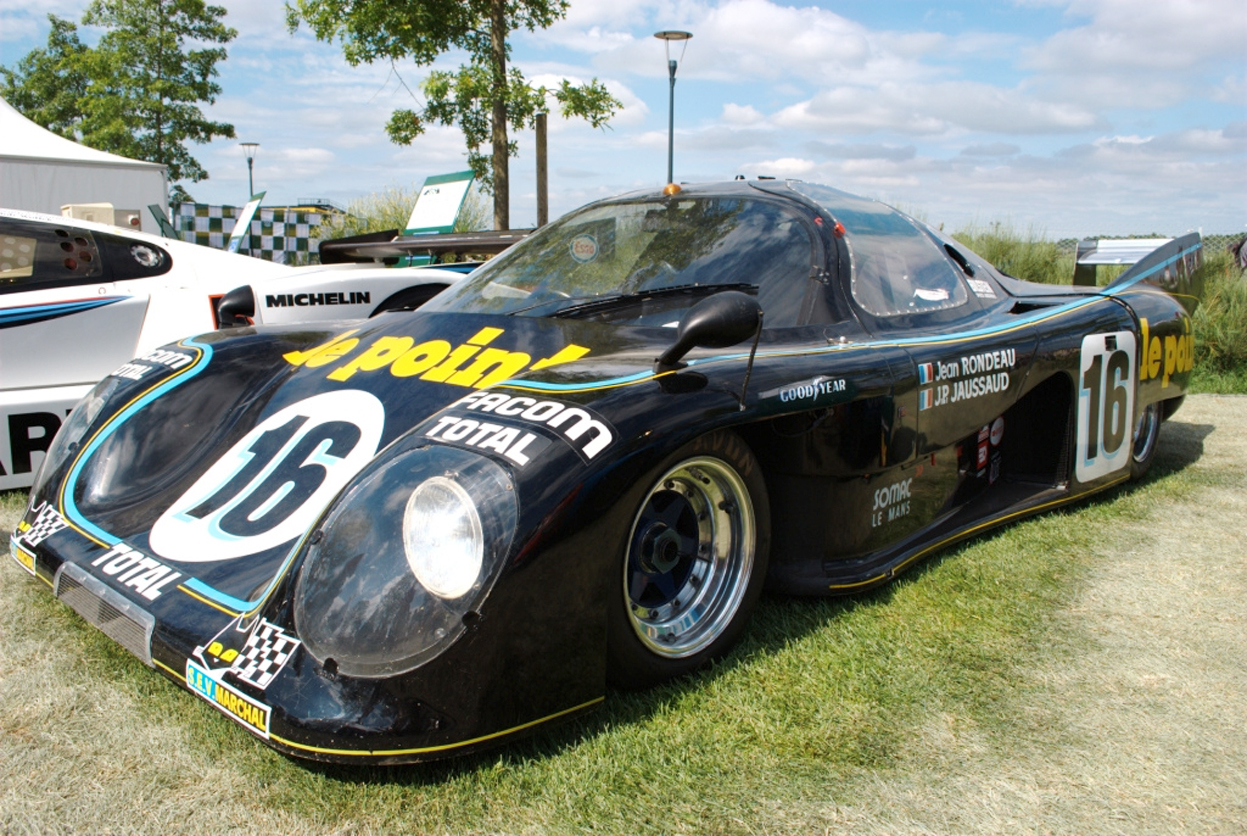
The Rondeau M379B that won the 1980 24 Hours of Le Mans

Jean Jacques Fernand Rondeau (13 May 1946 in Le Mans, France – 27 December 1985 in Champagné, France) was a French race car driver and constructor, who won the 24 Hours of Le Mans in 1980, in a car bearing his own name, an achievement which remains unique in the history of the race.

== Driving career ==
Rondeau drove briefly in Formula Renault before moving to saloon cars. He raced a handful of Le Mans events as a guest driver before leading the Inaltera team in 1976. After the wallpaper company withdrew its sponsorship, Rondeau continued with Ford-powered GTP cars bearing his own name in 1978, scoring a coup by hiring Henri Pescarolo for his team in 1979.

Rondeau and Jean-Pierre Jaussaud took victory in the 1980 24 Hours of Le Mans after fighting hard against the Porsche 908/80 of Jacky Ickx and Reinhold Joest. Rondeau remains the only man to win the race in a car bearing his own name and design. After teammates Pescarolo and Jean Ragnotti retired with engine problems during the night, Rondeau and Jaussaud took overall victory by a margin of two laps.

Rondeau finished second in the 1984 24 Hours of Le Mans as part of the American Preston Henn's race team, running with John Paul Jr. in a Porsche 956B. The pair finished two laps behind the Joest Racing Porsche 956B of Henri Pescarolo and Klaus Ludwig, and seven laps clear of the third placed Skoal Bandit 956B of David Hobbs, Philippe Streiff and Sarel van der Merwe.

== Constructor ==
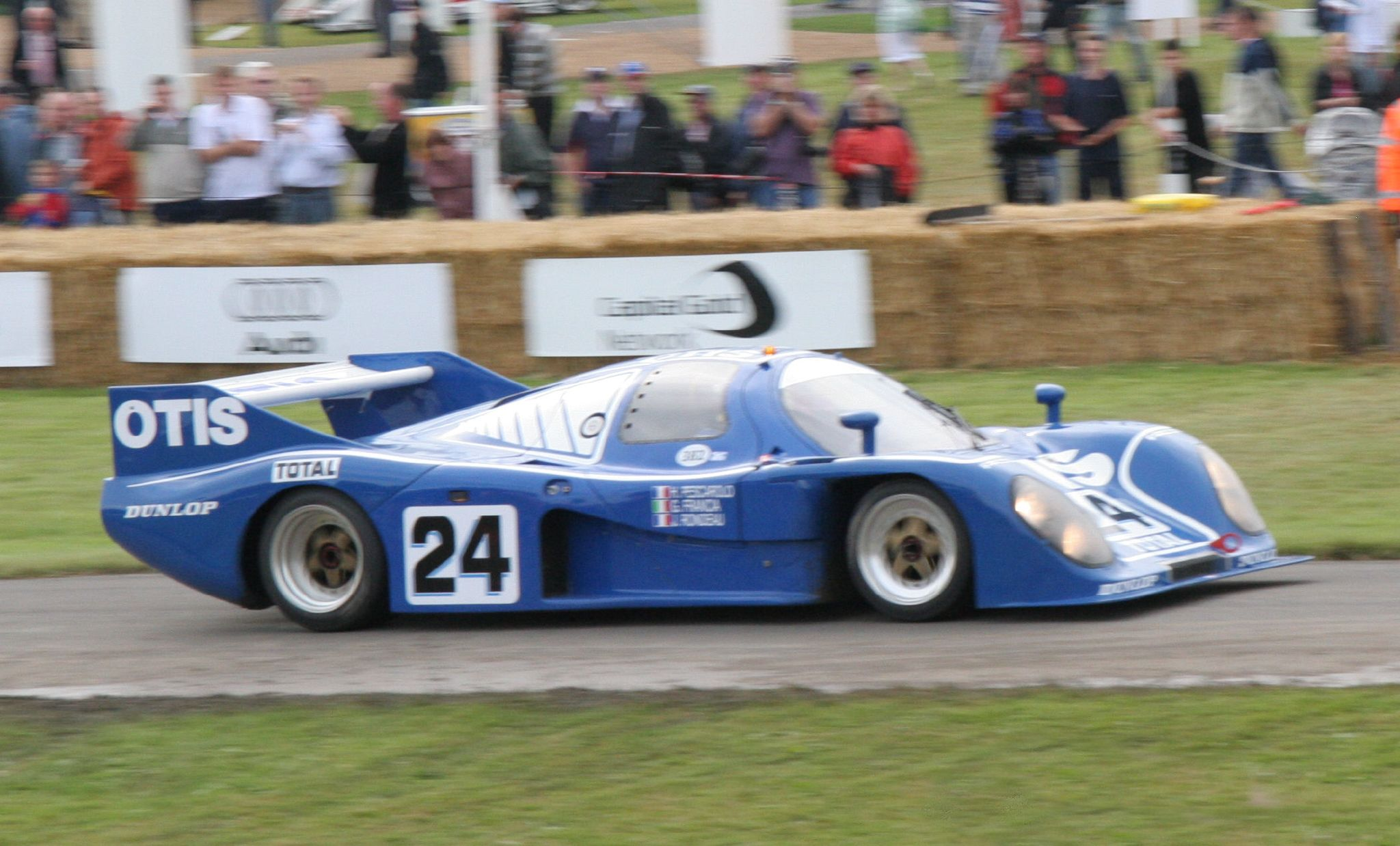
An early 1980s Rondeau M382 chassis.

Rondeau joined an effort to develop a Group Six race car to replace those of the French factory teams that withdrew from the class in 1975. The original project was centered on the use of a 2.7 L Peugeot V8 engine, but Rondeau was convinced that the more powerful Ford-Cosworth DFV V8, which had powered the winning car in the 1975 24 Hours of Le Mans, had greater prospects for success. After picking up sponsorship from the French wallpaper company Inaltera, Rondeau built a Group Six car eligible to compete in the GT prototype class. Rondeau's factory, similarly to those of Courage and Pescarolo Sport, was based near Le Mans. The first Rondeau-built car to compete at Le Mans was the Inaltera GTP in 1976. It achieved GTP class wins against Peugeot, Aston-Martin, and Ferrari powered cars for two consecutive years, in 1977 placing fourth overall and 27 laps behind the race winner.

After Inaltera withdrew its support, Rondeau picked up sponsorship from the elevator company Otis and built a slightly modified version of the Inaltera cars bearing his own name. The Rondeau M378 was introduced in 1978 and the M379 was unveiled the following year. Lackluster finishes in 1978 and 1979 fed the common regard of the DFV motor as uncompetitive in Group Six for want of an adequate combination of power and reliability. The Rondeau team then scored surprise first and third-place finishes in 1980 with the M379B. With that win Rondeau became one of two independent builders, not associated with a major manufacturer, to win at the 24 Hours of Le Mans since the event resumed in 1949. In 1981 Rondeau entered five cars, finishing second and third. However, this was overshadowed by the death of Rondeau team driver Jean-Louis Lafosse in the early hours of the race after crashing out on the Hunaudieres straight. Rondeau cars would never again approach those heights at Le Mans.

In 1982, the Rondeau team made a strong bid for the manufacturers' title in the World Endurance Championship with a win at the Monza 1000 km event and two other podium finishes that yielded a close second-place ranking behind Porsche in season points. The new 3.3 L and 3.9 L Cosworth DFL motors showed inadequate reliability for Le Mans, however, with all three works M382s retiring with mechanical failures. A controversial FIA ruling allowed Porsche to claim points from a privately entered 911 at the Nurburgring race, which gave the title to the German company. Rondeau's main sponsor, Otis, were so incensed that they withdrew sponsorship of the French concern. The 1983 season saw Otis replaced with Ford as Rondeau's main supporter and the entry of the new M482 at Le Mans. The inadequate reliability of the DFL motors and Rondeau's problems developing ground effects aerodynamics suggested that Rondeau would never again be competitive without major car and motor development that were beyond their means. Rondeau's team was disbanded at the end of 1983.

The Rondeau car was last seen at Le Mans in 1988 in privately run hands; Pescarolo has since occasionally run one of the M379Bs in historic competition. A total of 19 Rondeau chassis were constructed, of which 17 remain in existence.

== Death ==
Rondeau was killed when his car was hit by a train outside Champagné. He had been following a police car across the train tracks – while the boom gates were down – and his car was hit by the train that the gates had closed for.

== Racing record ==
=== Complete 24 Hours of Le Mans results ===
Year	Team	Co-drivers	Car	Class	Laps	Pos.	Class pos.
1972	(United Kingdom) Guy Edwards	(United Kingdom) Brian Robinson	Chevron B21-Cosworth	S 2.0	76	DNF	DNF
1974	(France) Christian Poirot	(France) Christian Poirot	Porsche 908/02	S 3.0	252	19th	7th
1975	(France) Auto Mazda Claude Buchet	(France) Claude Buchet	Mazda RX-3 Coupé	TS	78	DNF	DNF
1976	(France) Inaltéra	(Belgium) Christine Beckers (France) Jean-Pierre Jaussaud	Inaltéra GTP LM-Cosworth	GTP	264	21st	3rd
1977	(France) Inaltéra	(France) Jean Ragnotti	Inaltéra GTP LM77-Cosworth	GTP	315	4th	1st
1978	(France) Jean Rondeau	(France) Bernard Darniche (France) Jacky Haran	Rondeau M378-Cosworth	GTP	294	9th	1st
1979	(France) Jean Rondeau	(France) Jacky Haran	Rondeau M379-Cosworth	GTP	207	DNF	DNF
1980	(France) Jean Rondeau	(France) Jean-Pierre Jaussaud	Rondeau M379B-Cosworth	Gr.6; S 3.0	339	1st	1st
1981	(France) Jean Rondeau	(France) Jean-Pierre Jaussaud	Rondeau M379C-Cosworth	Gr.6; S +2.0	58	DNF	DNF
1982	(France) Automobiles Jean Rondeau	(France) Henri Pescarolo (France) Jean Ragnotti	Rondeau M382-Cosworth	Gr.C	146	DNF	DNF
1983	Jean Rondeau; Ford France	(France) Alain Ferté (France) Michel Ferté	Rondeau M482-Ford Cosworth	C	90	DNF	DNF
1984	(United States) Henn's T-Bird Swap Shop	(United States) John Paul Jr.	Porsche 956	C1	358	2nd	2nd
1985	(France) WM Peugeot	(France) Michel Pignard (France) Jean-Daniel Raulet	WM P83B-Peugeot	C1	299	17th	14th

Sporting positions
Preceded by Klaus Ludwig; Bill Whittington; Don Whittington	Winner of the 24 Hours of Le Mans; 1980 with: Jean-Pierre Jaussaud	Succeeded by Jacky Ickx; Derek Bell
