= Lancia LC1 =

Lancia sports car from 1982 to 1983

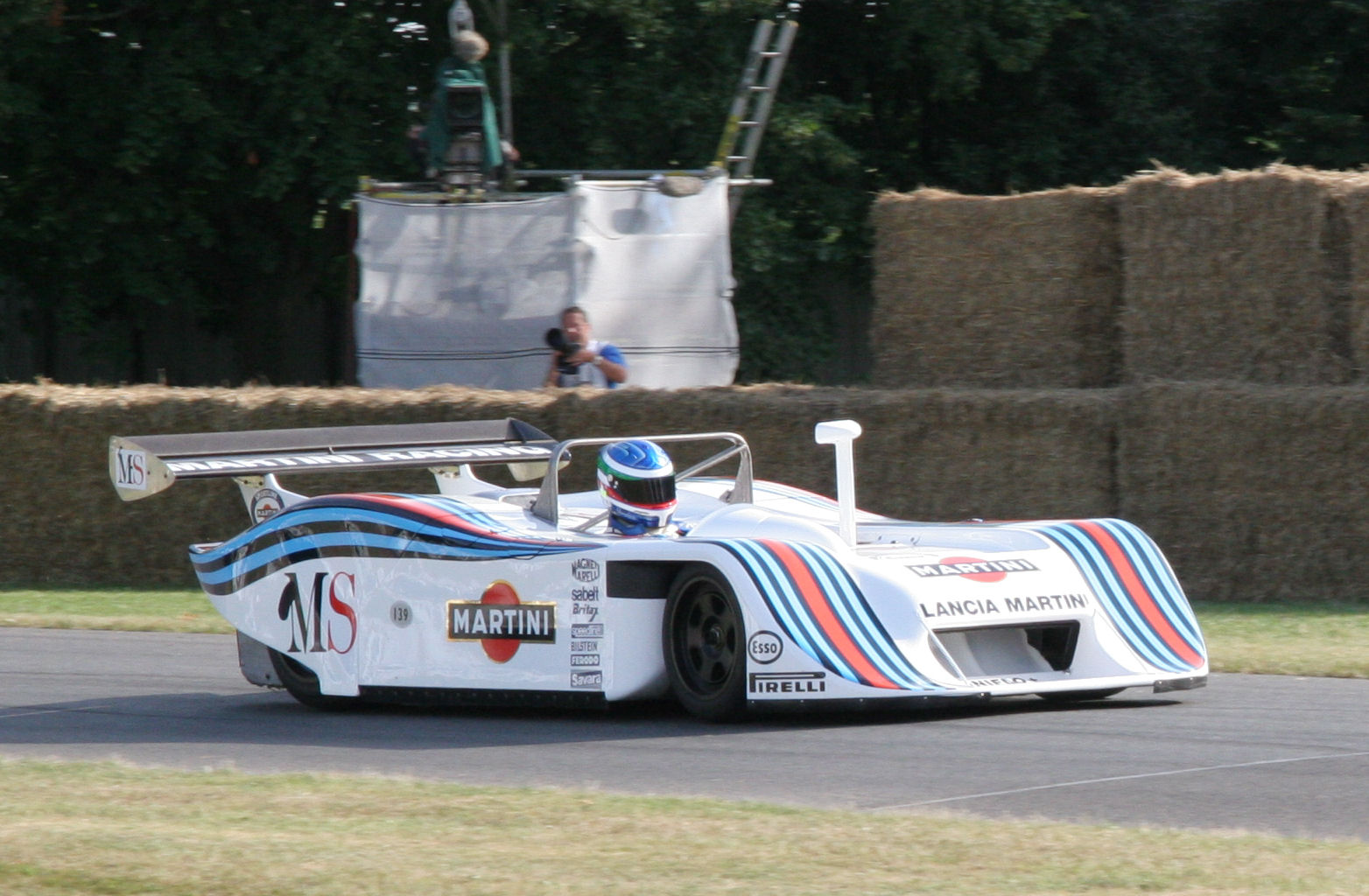
A Lancia LC1 doing a demonstration run.

The Lancia LC1 is a sports car run by Lancia under the Group 6 regulations in the World Endurance Championship and 24 Hours of Le Mans from 1982 to 1983. The car was built as an attempt by Lancia to move up from production-based competition with the Lancia Beta Montecarlo Turbo in Group 5.

The LC1 featured a chassis built by Dallara with an open cockpit, while the engine would be a 1425 cc straight-4 Lancia unit with a single turbocharger, as had been used in the previous Montecarlos. Martini Racing would run the program, with all cars running the Martini & Rossi colors.

However, the car's life was short due to rule changes enacted prior to the LC1's competition debut in 1982. Organisers had decided that Group 6 was to be phased out in place of the new Group C. In order to push manufacturers towards Group C, cars competing in other classes would not be allowed to earn points in the Manufacturers Championship, but would still be eligible in the Drivers Championship. To Lancia's advantage, Group 6 cars were not required to meet the fuel economy standards that Group C cars used, allowing the team to run flat-out throughout a race and compete for overall victories. The LC1s were therefore able to fight for overall race wins, earning three in the 1982 season. The quick pace of the car also earned it three pole positions. Lancia driver Riccardo Patrese was in contention for the Drivers Championship into the final round, but ended the year eight points behind Porsche's Jacky Ickx.

With the LC1 already restricted the project was quickly abandoned in 1983, with Lancia building an all-new car to Group C regulations known as the LC2. The LC1s still saw some competition in 1983, as Italian squad Sivama Motor modified a pair of LC1s to include a closed cockpit and meet Group C regulations. These cars saw mixed results before they too were abandoned at the end of the 1983 season.
