= Rondeau M379 =

French racing car

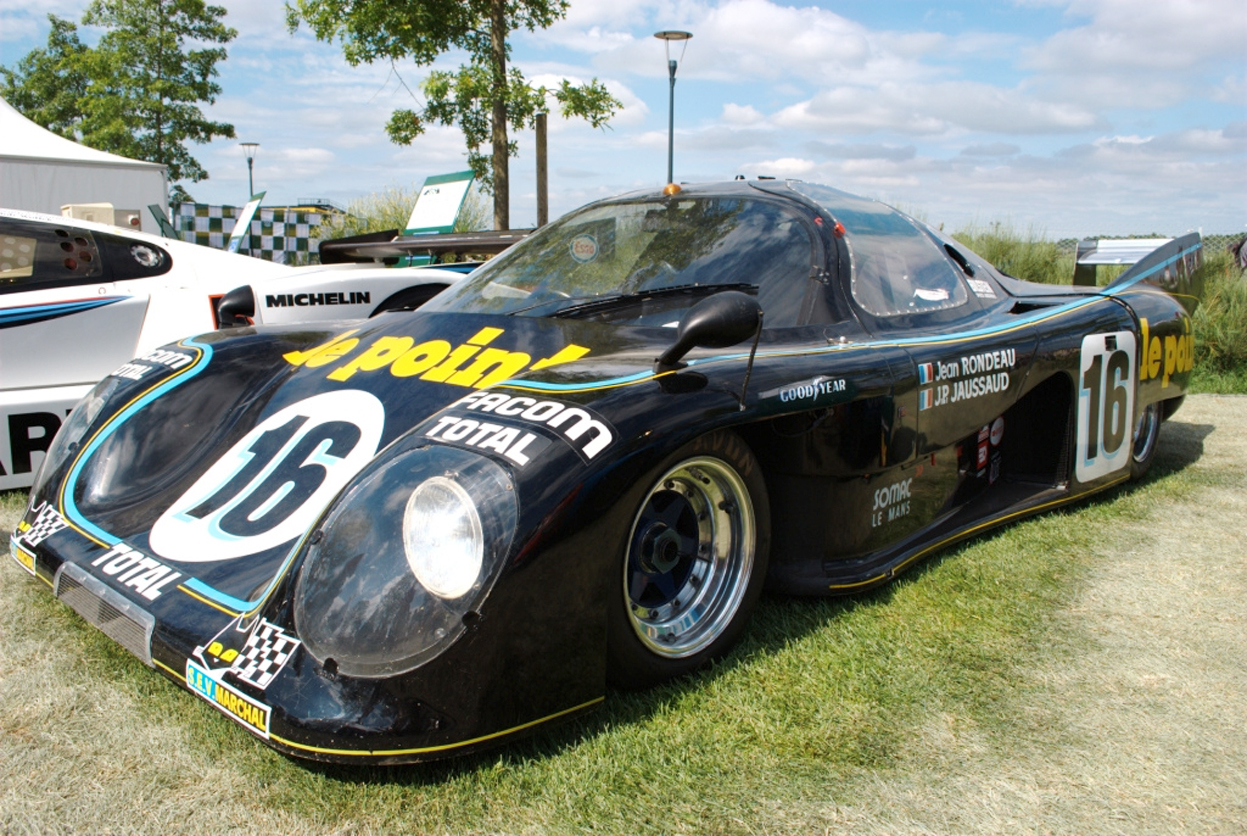
- The 1980 24 Hours of Le Mans winning car
- Category: Group 6
- Constructor: Rondeau
- Designer: Jean Rondeau
- Predecessor: Rondeau M378
- Successor: Rondeau M382

Technical specifications
- Engine: Ford-Cosworth DFV 3.0 L (183.1 cu in) V8, mid-engined
- Power: 460 hp (340 kW)
- Weight: 760 kg (1,675.5 lb)

Competition history
Entries	Races	Wins	Podiums	Poles
27	18	2	3	1

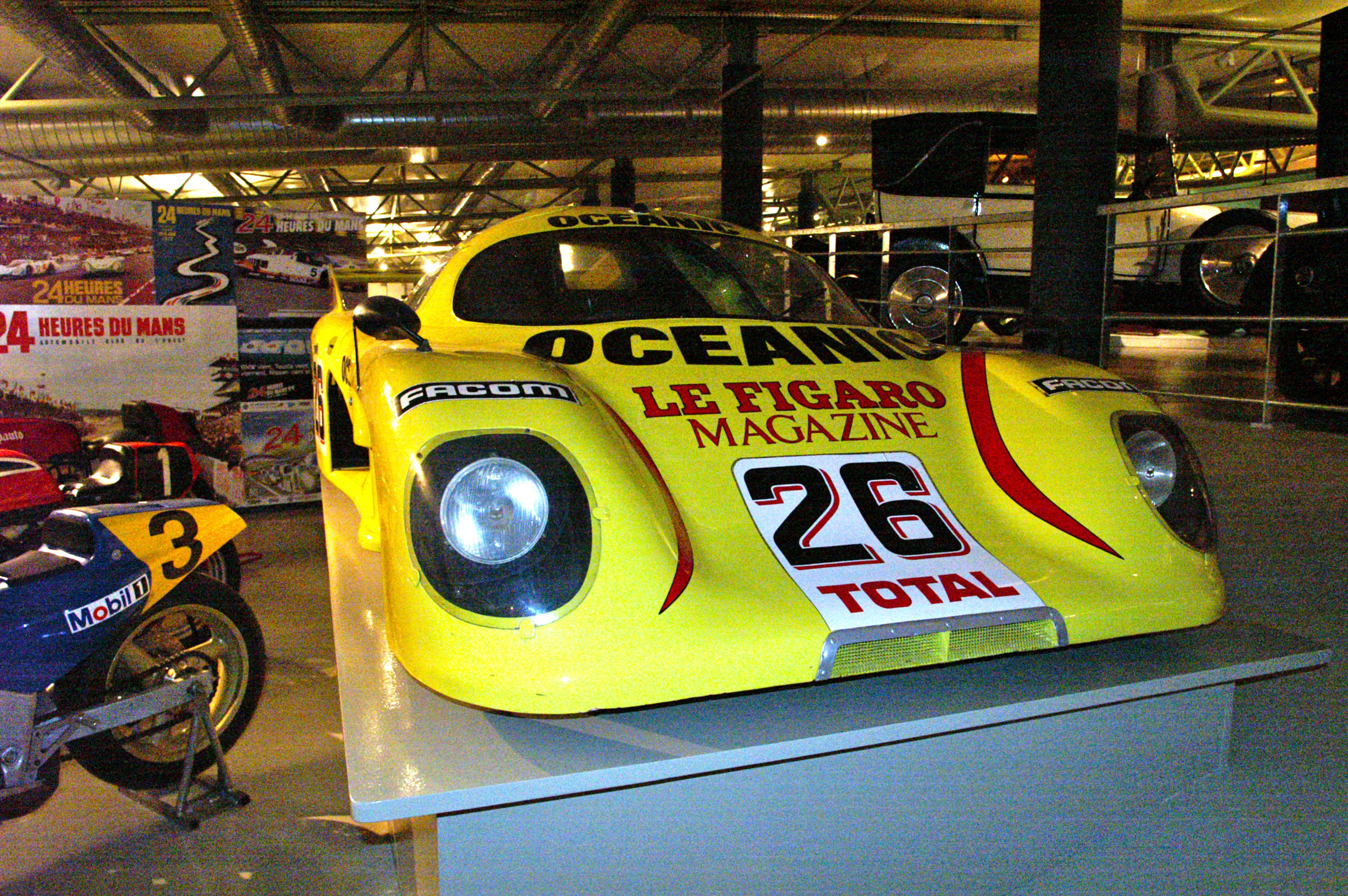
The M379 of Henri Pescarolo and Patrick Tambay in 1981

The Rondeau M379 is a Group 6 sports prototype race car, designed, developed and built by Automobiles Jean Rondeau, and competed in sports car racing between 1979 and 1988. It also notably successfully won the 24 Hours of Le Mans in 1980. During the 1981 24 Hours of Le Mans, two cars finished on the podium, but the race was marred by the death of Jean-Louis Lafosse, driving one of the five M379s entered in the event. It achieved one further win, at Monza in 1982. It scored a total of five podium finishes, and three class wins. It was powered by a 3.0 L (180 cu in), 460 hp (340 kW), Ford-Cosworth DFV V8 Formula One engine.The chassis is an aluminum-reinforced steel spaceframe, covered in a fiberglass panel body. This drove the rear wheels through a Hewland 5-speed manual transmission. This meant it was very light, with the total weight coming to 760 kg (1,680 lb).

== Wins/Victories ==
The car only shone at the 24 Hours of Le Mans and participated very little in other races. It was only with the next car, the Rondeau M382, that Jean Rondeau entered the World Sportscar Championship.

24 Hours of Le Mans :

- 5th and Winner of Group 6 in 1979 with Jean Ragnotti and Bernard Darniche
- Victory in 1980 with Jean Rondeau (racing driver) and Jean-Pierre Jaussaud and 3rd place with Gordon Spice, Philippe Martin, and Jean-Michel Martin
- 2nd and Winner of the GTP Group in 1981 with Jacky Haran, Jean-Louis Schlesser and Philippe Streiff and 3rd place with Gordon Spice and François Migault
