= Henri Pescarolo =

French racing driver (born 1942)

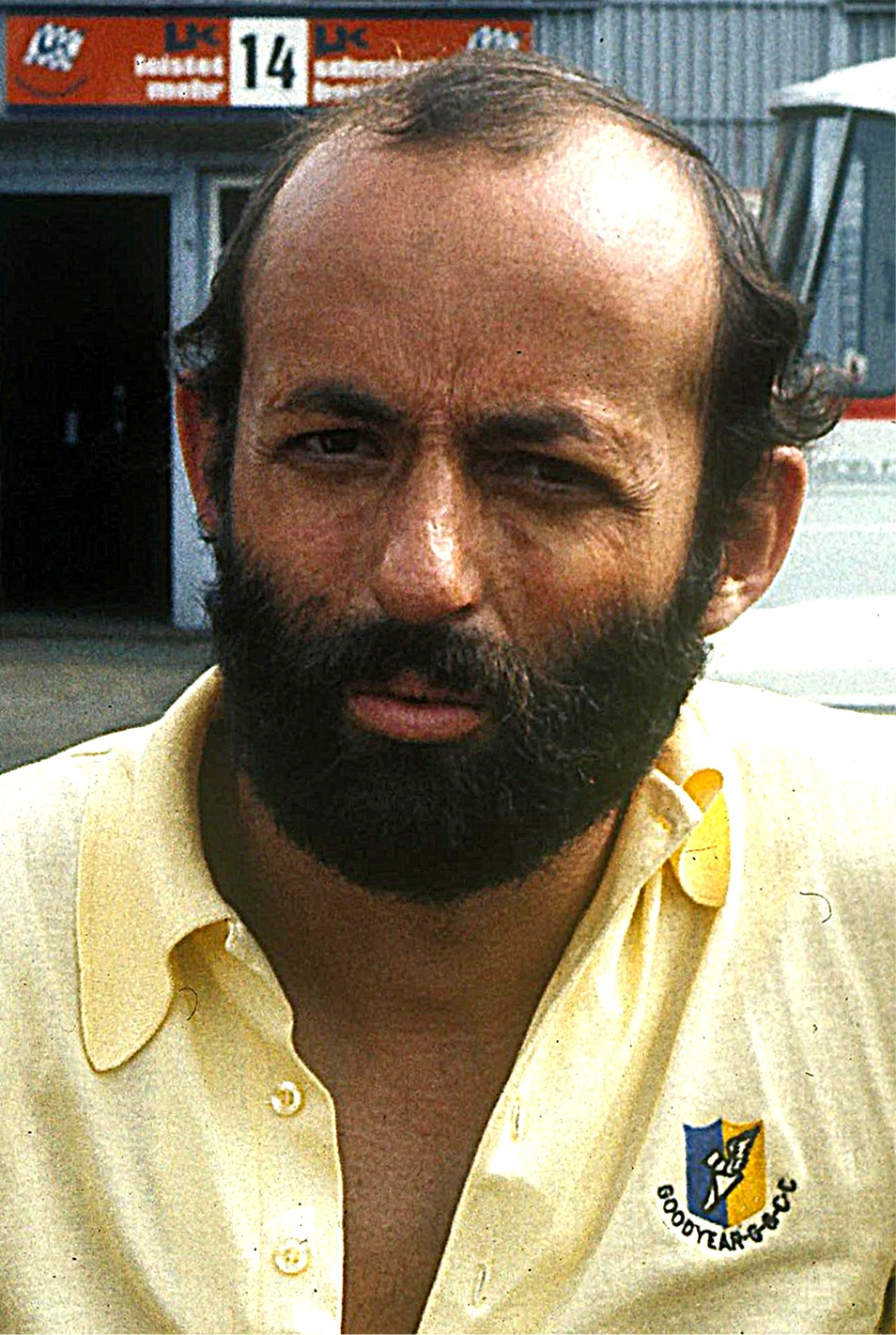
- Pescarolo in 1973
- Born: Henri Jacques William Pescarolo; 25 September 1942 (age 84); Montfermeil, Seine-Saint-Denis, France

Formula One World Championship career
- Nationality: (France) French
- Active years: 1968–1974, 1976
- Team(s): Matra, Frank Williams, March, BRM, privateer Surtees
- Entries: 64 (57 starts)
- Championships: 0
- Wins: 0
- Podiums: 1
- Career points: 12
- Pole positions: 0
- Fastest laps: 1
- First entry: 1968 Canadian Grand Prix
- Last entry: 1976 United States Grand Prix

24 Hours of Le Mans career
- Years: 1966–1968, 1970–1999
- Teams: Matra, Filipinetti, Ligier, Inaltéra, Martini, Rondeau, Ford, Joest, Lancia, Sauber, Jaguar, Porsche, Courage, Pescarolo
- Best finish: 1st (1972, 1973, 1974, 1984)
- Class wins: 6 (1972, 1973, 1974, 1976, 1984, 1992)

Henri Jacques William Pescarolo (French pronunciation: [ɑ̃ʁi pɛskaʁɔlo]; born 25 September 1942) is a French former racing driver and motorsport executive, who competed in Formula One from 1968 to 1976. In endurance racing, Pescarolo is a four-time winner of the 24 Hours of Le Mans, and won the 24 Hours of Daytona in 1991 with Joest.

Born and raised in Paris, Pescarolo began his career in a Lotus Seven aged 22. Pescarolo participated in 64 Formula One Grands Prix, achieving one fastest lap, one podium finish, and 12 championship points. He also entered the 24 Hours of Le Mans a record 33 times between 1966 and 1999, with four overall and six class wins; he won several other major sportscar racing events, including the: 24 Hours of Daytona, 1000 km of Monza, 1000 km of Spa-Francorchamps, 6 Hours of Nürburgring and 1000 km Buenos Aires. Pescarolo also drove in the Dakar Rally in the 1990s, before retiring from racing aged 57.

Upon his retirement from motor racing in 1999, Pescarolo founded the eponymous racing team, Pescarolo Sport, which competed at Le Mans until 2013. He was widely known for his distinctive green helmet, and full-face beard that partially covers burns suffered in a crash.

== Early career and Formula One ==
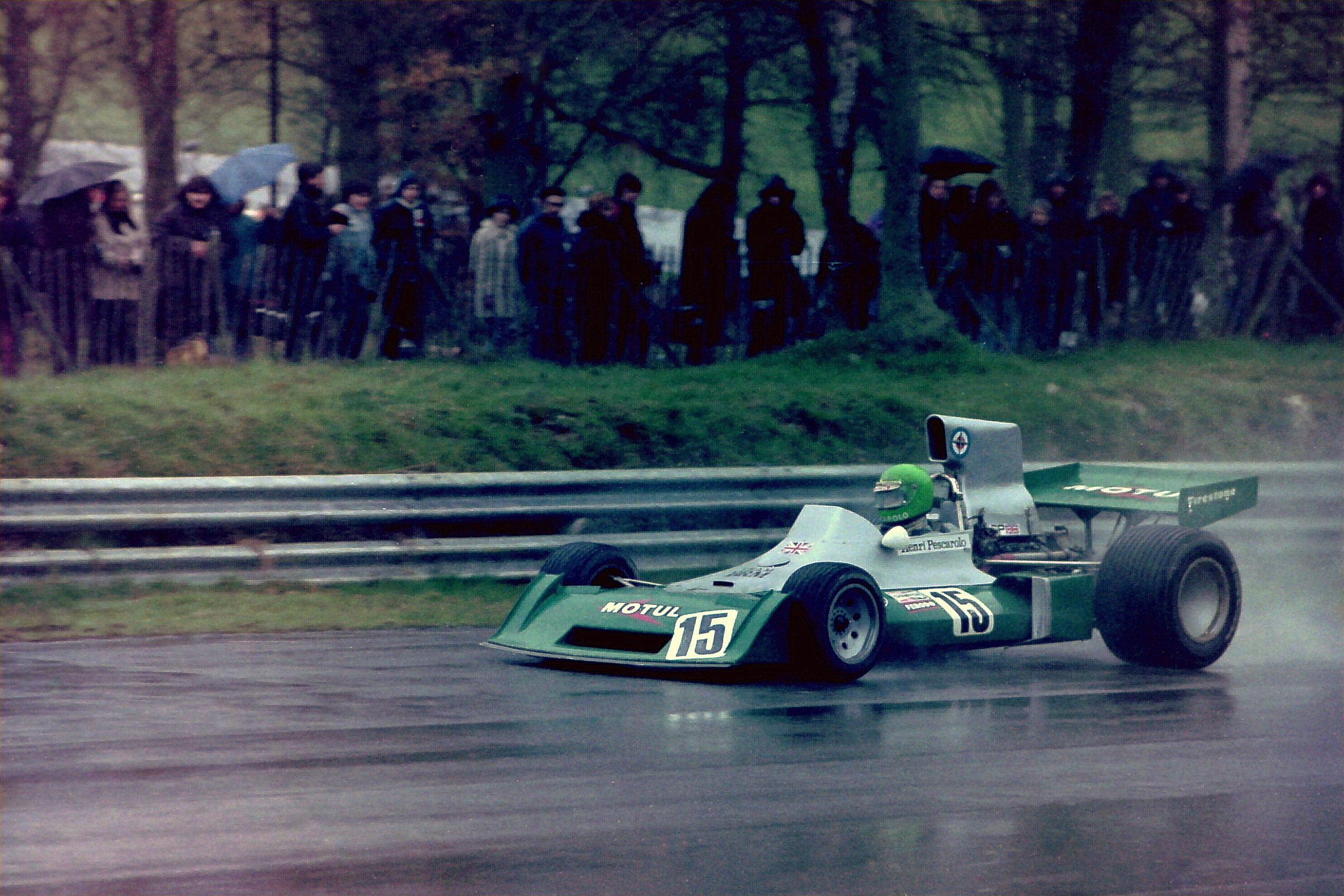
Pescarolo at the 1974 Race of Champions

Born in Montfermeil near Paris, Pescarolo began his career in 1965 with a Lotus Seven. He was successful enough to be offered a third car in the Matra Formula 3 team for 1966, but the car was not ready until mid-season. However, in 1967 he won the European Championship with Matra and was promoted to Formula 2 for 1968. That season he was team-mate to Jean-Pierre Beltoise and achieved several second places and a win at Albi, which led to him being given a drive in Matra's Formula One team for the last three races of 1968.

Pescarolo's career suffered a setback, in April 1969 at the Le Mans additional test session for the 1969 24 Hours of Le Mans, when his Matra sports car got airborne on the Mulsanne Straight. Pescarolo was badly burned and did not compete again until mid-season. He returned in August for the 1969 German Grand Prix where he drove a Formula 2 Matra into fifth place winning the small capacity class, in his only Grand Prix race that season.

For 1970, Pescarolo was signed full-time by Matra for their Formula One team and once again as team-mate to Beltoise, put in a solid season with a third place at the Monaco Grand Prix being the high point. He also won the Paris 1000 km and Buenos Aires 1000 km sports car races partnered with Beltoise. Pescarolo was not retained by Matra, and in 1971, 1972, and 1973 with Motul sponsorship, he drove for the fledgling Formula One team run by the young Frank Williams, but with little success. In 1974, Pescarolo drove for BRM, again with Motul backing, but the team's best days were gone and a ninth place in Argentina was his best result in a season with many retirements.

Pescarolo did not compete in Formula One in 1975 but returned to the championship in 1976 with a Surtees privately entered by BS Fabrications. Although neither car nor driver was considered to be competitive, failing to qualify for two of nine Grands Prix entered, Pescarolo did begin to show speed in the final five races, scoring a season's best finish of ninth at the 1976 Austrian Grand Prix.

== Career after Formula One – sportscars ==
After Pescarolo's retirement from Formula One, he went on to start his own team, which competed until 2012 in the Le Mans Endurance Series and the 24 Hours of Le Mans, which he won as a driver four times (1972, 1973, 1974 and 1984). Pescarolo won the Porsche Cup, an annual award presented by Porsche AG to recognize the world's most successful privateer racing driver competing with Porsche machinery in a customer racing team, in 1984.

His team, Pescarolo Sport, was notably sponsored by Sony's PlayStation 2 and by Gran Turismo 4. During the five years that Pescarolo has campaigned Courage C60 prototypes, so many modifications have been made to the model that Courage allowed the team to name the car after themselves, such was the differences between their model and the standard C60. In 2005, it was developed further still to meet the "hybrid" regulations, before the change to LMP1/2 format.

In 1977, 1978 and 1979, Pescarolo drove in Australia's most famous motor race, the Bathurst 1000 for touring cars held at the Mount Panorama Circuit, driving on all three occasions with 1974 race winner John Goss. Unfortunately all races resulted in a DNF for the Goss built Ford XC Falcon GS500 Hardtops, completing only 113 laps (of 163) in 1977, 68 in 1978 and 118 in 1979. The 1977 race saw Pescarolo's Le Mans rival Jacky Ickx win the race in a semi-works Falcon driving with Allan Moffat.

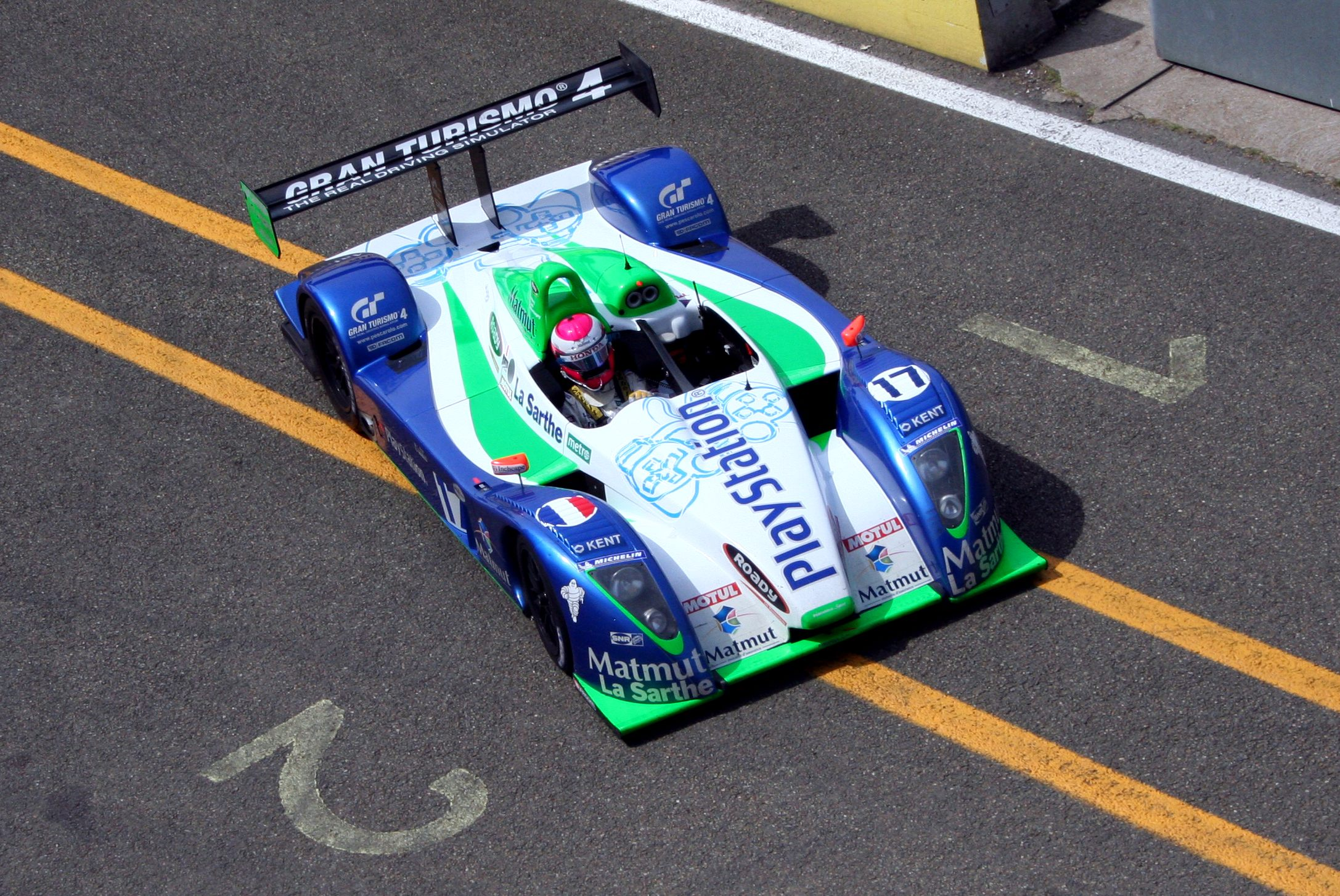
Franck Montagny driving the Pescarolo C60 during practice for the 2006 24 Hours of Le Mans.

Pescarolo holds the record for Le Mans starts with 33 and has won the race on four occasions as a driver. He has yet to win the race as a team owner, coming very close in 2005 with the Pescarolo C60H. His team did manage to win the LMES championship in the same year. His team was also second at Le Mans in 2006, followed by a third in 2007 behind a pair of diesel-powered prototypes.

Pescarolo drove the Dakar Rally in the 1990s, and is also a keen helicopter pilot.

== Racing record ==
=== 24 Hours of Le Mans results ===
Year	Team	Co-Drivers	Car	Class	Laps	Pos.	Class Pos.
1966	(France) Matra Sports	(France) Jean-Pierre Jaussaud	Matra M620-BRM	P 2.0	35	DNF	DNF
1967	(France) Equipe Matra Sports	(France) Jean-Pierre Jaussaud	Matra MS630-BRM	P 2.0	55	DNF	DNF
1968	(France) Equipe Matra Sports	(France) Johnny Servoz-Gavin	Matra MS630	P 3.0	283	DNF	DNF
1970	(France) Equipe Matra-Simca	(France) Jean-Pierre Beltoise	Matra-Simca MS660	P 3.0	79	DNF	DNF
1971	(Switzerland) Scuderia Filipinetti	(United Kingdom) Mike Parkes	Ferrari 512F	S 5.0	120	DNF	DNF
1972	(France) Equipe Matra-Simca Shell	(United Kingdom) Graham Hill	Matra-Simca MS670	S 3.0	344	**1st**	**1st**
1973	(France) Equipe Matra-Simca Shell	(France) Gérard Larrousse	Matra-Simca MS670B	S 3.0	355	**1st**	**1st**
1974	(France) Equipe Gitanes	(France) Gérard Larrousse	Matra-Simca MS670C	S 3.0	337	**1st**	**1st**
1975	(France) Gitanes Automobiles Ligier	(France) François Migault	Ligier JS2-Ford Cosworth	S 3.0	146	DNF	DNF
1976	(France) Inaltera	(France) Jean-Pierre Beltoise	Inaltera LM-Ford Cosworth	GTP	305	8th	**1st**
1977	(Germany) Martini Racing Porsche System	(Belgium) Jacky Ickx	Porsche 936/77	S +2.0	45	DNF	DNF
1978	(Germany) Martini Racing Porsche System	(Belgium) Jacky Ickx (Germany) Jochen Mass	Porsche 936/78	S +2.0	255	DNF	DNF
1979	(France) ITT Oceanic Jean Rondeau	(France) Jean-Pierre Beltoise	Rondeau M379-Ford Cosworth	S +2.0	279	10th	**2nd**
1980	(France) ITT Jean Rondeau	(France) Jean Ragnotti	Rondeau M379-Ford Cosworth	S +2.0	124	DNF	DNF
1981	(France) Oceanic Jean Rondeau	(France) Patrick Tambay	Rondeau M379-Ford Cosworth	2 +2.0	41	DNF	DNF
1982	(France) Otis Automobiles Jean Rondeau	(France) Jean Ragnotti (France) Jean Rondeau	Rondeau M382-Ford Cosworth	C	146	DNF	DNF
1983	Ford France	(Belgium) Thierry Boutsen	Rondeau M482-Ford Cosworth	C	174	DNF	DNF
1984	(Germany) New-Man Joest Racing	(Germany) Klaus Ludwig	Porsche 956B	C1	360	**1st**	**1st**
1985	(Italy) Martini Lancia	(Italy) Mauro Baldi	Lancia LC2-Ferrari	C1	358	7th	7th
1986	(Switzerland) Kouros Racing Team	(Germany) Christian Danner (Austria) Dieter Quester	Sauber C8-Mercedes	C1	86	DNF	DNF
1987	(Switzerland) Kouros Racing	(New Zealand) Mike Thackwell (Japan) Hideki Okada	Sauber C9-Mercedes	C1	123	DNF	DNF
1988	(United Kingdom) Silk Cut Jaguar (United Kingdom) Tom Walkinshaw Racing	(United Kingdom) John Watson (Brazil) Raul Boesel	Jaguar XJR-9LM	C1	129	DNF	DNF
1989	(Germany) Joest Racing	(France) Claude Ballot-Léna (France) Jean-Louis Ricci	Porsche 962C	C1	371	6th	6th
1990	(Germany) Joest Porsche Racing	(France) Jean-Louis Ricci (France) Jacques Laffite	Porsche 962C	C1	328	14th	14th
1991	(Austria) Konrad Motorsport (Germany) Joest Porsche Racing	(Germany) Louis Krages (Germany) Bernd Schneider	Porsche 962C	C2	197	DNF	DNF
1992	(France) Courage Compétition	(France) Bob Wollek (France) Jean-Louis Ricci	Cougar C28LM-Porsche	C3	335	6th	**1st**
1993	(Germany) Joest Porsche Racing	(France) Bob Wollek (Germany) Ronny Meixner	Porsche 962C	C2	351	9th	4th
1994	(France) Courage Compétition	(France) Alain Ferté (France) Franck Lagorce	Courage C32LM-Porsche	LMP1; C90	142	DNF	DNF
1995	(France) Courage Compétition	(France) Franck Lagorce (France) Éric Bernard	Courage C41-Chevrolet	WSC	26	DNF	DNF
1996	(France) La Filière Elf	(France) Franck Lagorce (France) Emmanuel Collard	Courage C36-Porsche	LMP1	327	7th	**2nd**
1997	(France) La Filière Elf	(France) Jean-Philippe Belloc (France) Emmanuel Clérico	Courage C36-Porsche	LMP	319	7th	4th
1998	(France) La Filière Elf (France) Courage Compétition	(France) Olivier Grouillard (France) Franck Montagny	Courage C36-Porsche	LMP1	304	15th	4th
1999	(France) La Filière Elf (France) Pescarolo Promotion Racing Team	(France) Michel Ferté (France) Patrice Gay	Courage C50-Porsche	LMP	327	9th	8th

=== Complete European Formula Two Championship results ===
(key) (Races in bold indicate pole position; races in italics indicate fastest lap)

Year	Entrant	Chassis	Engine	1	2	3	4	5	6	7	8	9	10	11	12	13	14	15	16	17	Pos.	Pts
1967	Matra Sports	Matra MS7	Ford	SNE	SIL	NÜR	HOC	TUL	JAR	ZAN	PER	BRH; 10	VAL								NC	0
1968	Matra Sports	Matra MS7	Ford	HOC; 2	THR; Ret	JAR; 4	PAL; DNQ	TUL; 3	ZAN; 2	**PER**; 8	HOC; 2	VAL; 5									2nd	30
1969	Matra Sports	Matra MS7	Ford	THR; 4	**HOC**; 5	NÜR	JAR	TUL; Ret	PER; NC	VAL											4th	13
1970	Bob Gerard Racing	Brabham BT30	Ford	THR	HOC	**BAR**; 2	ROU; Ret	PER	TUL	IMO	HOC										10th	6
1971	Frank Williams Racing Cars	March 712M	Ford	HOC	**THR**; Ret	NÜR; Ret	JAR	PAL; Ret	ROU	MAN	TUL; Ret	ALB; DNQ	VAL; Ret	VAL							NC	0
1972	Motul-Rondel Racing	Brabham BT38	Ford	MAL	THR; DNS	HOC; Ret	PAU; DNQ	PAL; DNQ	HOC	ROU; Ret	ÖST	IMO	MAN	PER; 1	SAL	ALB	HOC; 7				NC	0^{‡}
1973	Motul-Rondel Racing	Motul M1	Ford	MAL	HOC; 4	THR; 1	NÜR	PAU	KIN	NIV	HOC; 5	ROU	MNZ	MAN	KAR	PER; Ret	SAL	NOR; 3	ALB; Ret	VAL	NC	0^{‡}

^{‡} Graded drivers not eligible for European Formula Two Championship points

=== Complete Formula One World Championship results ===
(key) (Races in italics indicate fastest lap)

Year	Entrant	Chassis	Engine	1	2	3	4	5	6	7	8	9	10	11	12	13	14	15	16	WDC	Pts
1968	Matra Sports	Matra MS11	Matra MS9 3.0 V12	RSA	ESP	MON	BEL	NED	FRA	GBR	GER	ITA	CAN; Ret	USA; DNS	MEX; 9					NC	0
1969	Matra Sports	Matra MS7 (F2)	Ford Cosworth FVA 1.6 L4	RSA	ESP	MON	NED	FRA	GBR	GER; 5	ITA	CAN	USA	MEX						NC	0
1970	Équipe Matra Elf	Matra-Simca MS120	Matra MS12 3.0 V12	RSA; 7	ESP; Ret	MON; 3	BEL; 6	NED; 8	FRA; 5	GBR; Ret	GER; 6	AUT; 14	ITA; Ret	CAN; 7	USA; 8	MEX; 9				12th	8
1971	Frank Williams Racing Cars	March 701	Ford Cosworth DFV 3.0 V8	RSA; 11																17th	4
1971	Frank Williams Racing Cars	March 711	Ford Cosworth DFV 3.0 V8		ESP; Ret	MON; 8	NED; 13	FRA; Ret	GBR; 4	GER; Ret	AUT; 6	ITA; Ret	CAN; DNS	USA; Ret						17th	4
1972	Team Williams Motul	March 721	Ford Cosworth DFV 3.0 V8	ARG; 8	RSA; 11	ESP; 11	MON; Ret	BEL; NC	FRA; DNS		GER; Ret	AUT; DNS	ITA; DNQ	CAN; 13	USA; 14					NC	0
1972	Team Williams Motul	Politoys FX3	Ford Cosworth DFV 3.0 V8							GBR; Ret										NC	0
1973	STP March Racing Team	March 721G/731	Ford Cosworth DFV 3.0 V8	ARG	BRA	RSA	ESP; 8	BEL	MON	SWE										NC	0
1973	Frank Williams Racing Cars	Iso-Marlboro IR	Ford Cosworth DFV 3.0 V8								FRA; Ret	GBR	NED	GER; 10	AUT	ITA	CAN	USA		NC	0
1974	Team BRM	BRM P160E	BRM P142 3.0 V12	ARG; 9	BRA; 14	RSA; 18	ESP; 12	BEL; Ret	MON; Ret		NED; Ret									NC	0
1974	Team BRM	BRM P201	BRM P200 3.0 V12							SWE; Ret		FRA; Ret	GBR; Ret	GER; 10	AUT	ITA; Ret	CAN	USA		NC	0
1976	Team Norev Racing with BS Fabrications	Surtees TS19	Ford Cosworth DFV 3.0 V8	BRA	RSA	USW	ESP	BEL	MON; DNQ	SWE	FRA; Ret	GBR; Ret	GER; DNQ	AUT; 9	NED; 11	ITA; 17	CAN; 19	USA; NC	JPN	NC	0

=== Non-championship Formula One results ===
(key)

Year	Entrant	Chassis	Engine	1	2	3	4	5	6	7	8
1967	Matra Sports	Matra MS5 (F2)	Ford Cosworth FVA 1.6 L4	ROC	SPC	INT	SYR	OUL; 8			
1967	Matra Sports	Matra MS7 (F2)	Ford Cosworth FVA 1.6 L4						ESP; 7		
1971	Frank Williams Racing Cars	March 701	Ford Cosworth DFV 3.0 V8	ARG; 2	ROC						
1971	Frank Williams Racing Cars	March 711	Ford Cosworth DFV 3.0 V8			QUE; Ret	SPR	INT; 6	RIN	OUL; Ret	VIC; Ret
1972	Team Williams Motul	March 721	Ford Cosworth DFV 3.0 V8	ROC	BRA; Ret	INT; Ret	OUL		VIC; Ret		
1972	Team Williams Motul	March 711	Ford Cosworth DFV 3.0 V8					REP; Ret			
1974	Team BRM	BRM P160E	BRM P142 3.0 V12	PRE; 7	ROC; 7	INT; 4					

=== Major race results ===
- 24 hours of Daytona : 1st, 1991
- 1000 km Buenos Aires : 1st, 1970
- 6 Hours of Nürburgring : 1st, 1986
- Brands Hatch 1000 km : 1st, 1971
- 1000 km Zeltweg : 1st, 1972, 1974, 1975
- Dijon 1000 km : 1st, 1972, 1978, 1979
- 6 Hours of Imola : 1st, 1974
- Spa 1000 km : 1st, 1975
- Suzuka 10 Hours : 1st, 1981
- 1000 km Monza : 1st, 1982
- 6 Hours of Vallelunga : 1st, 1972, 1978
- 6 Hours of Kyalami : 1st, 1974
- 6 Hours of Watkins Glen : 1st, 1972, 1974, 1975
- Interserie Siegerland : 1st, 1984
- 1000 km of Paris : 1st, 1969, 1994

== See also ==
- Pescarolo Sport

Sporting positions
Preceded by Johnny Servoz-Gavin	French Formula Three; Champion; 1967	Succeeded by François Cevert
Preceded by Jean-Pierre Beltoise	Monaco Formula Three Support; Race Winner; 1967	Succeeded by Jean-Pierre Jaussaud
Preceded by Helmut Marko; Gijs van Lennep	Winner of the 24 Hours of Le Mans; 1972, 1973, 1974; With: Graham Hill (1972) & Gérard Larrousse (1973-74)	Succeeded by Jacky Ickx; Derek Bell
Preceded by Vern Schuppan; Al Holbert; Hurley Haywood	Winner of the 24 Hours of Le Mans; 1984; With: Klaus Ludwig	Succeeded by Klaus Ludwig; Paolo Barilla; Louis Krages
