= WM P82 =

The Welter-Meunier P82, and its successors and derivatives, including the P83, the P83B, and the P86, are a series of mid-engined Group C sports prototype race cars, designed, developed and built by French racing team Welter Racing, for sports car racing, between 1982 and 1986. The cars best result was a 6th-place finish at the 1982 1000km of Monza, being driven by Roger Dorchy, Guy Fréquelin, and Jean-Daniel Raulet. It was powered by a Garrett twin-turbocharged, 2.7 L (160 cu in), Peugeot PRV, V6 engine, producing between 600–890 hp (450–660 kW) at 8300 rpm, depending on boost pressure, which drove the rear wheels through a 5-speed manual transmission. The chassis design was constructed into an aluminum monocoque, and the car weighed approximately 900 kg (2,000 lb).

== WM P83/P83B ==
The P83 was a development of the P82, used by Welter Racing in the Le Mans 24 Hours between 1983 and 1986.

The WM P83 was developed by Welter in 1983 so that the prototype could take part in the 24 Hours of Le Mans that same year. The chassis was already based on the monocoque construction and the body was pulled down well over the rear wheels, a typical feature of Welter racing cars. Gérard Welter, who worked as an aerodynamicist and vehicle designer at Peugeot, was able to draw on wind tunnel tests. A powerful rear wing provided the necessary contact pressure on the rear axle. The P83 was powered by a 2.8-liter 6-cylinder Peugeot turbo engine that delivered almost 420 hp.

Two cars were used in Le Mans, which finished 17th and 18th in practice. The car with starting number 9 was occupied by the Belgian Didier Theys and in the car with number 10 alongside Pascal Fabre – who drove for AGS in Formula 1 in 1987 – was Welter regular driver Roger Dorchy. For the Theys car, the race came to an end after 102 laps had been driven. The Peugeot engine had run so hot that it would not start after a pit stop. The team also had to struggle with an overheated engine in the second car, but after a few unscheduled pit stops the team finished 16th overall.

In 1984 the vehicles were revised and used until 1986 as P83B in Le Mans. The rear end became wider while keeping the rear wheel covers. In the 1984 24-hour race, Roger Dorchy surprisingly took the lead from eighth place on the grid. It was the first time a welter racer had held the lead at Le Mans. However, it only took one lap before Dorchy was relegated from first place. In 1984 both vehicles failed. In 1985, the number 42 car - also driven by former Le Mans winner Jean Rondeau - finished 17th overall, while the second car was disqualified and the third car had an accident.

1986 was the last Le Mans year for the P83. At the same time, the P86 was already used and the P83 was therefore no longer developed, which was also reflected in the disappointing 34th starting position. The trio Roger Dorchy/Claude Haldi/Pascal Pessiot finished in twelfth place overall at the end of the race.

== WM P86 ==
The P86 was another development of the P82, constructed by Welter Racing in 1986 and used in sports car racing until 1987.

The WM P86 was one of the fast racing car prototypes that Gérard Welter developed in the 1980s with financial support from Peugeot and entered and used in the 24 Hours of Le Mans. The type designation at Welter was simple. The W stood for Gérard Welter himself, the M for founding member Michel Meunier. P86 stands for prototypes and the year abbreviation indicated the year of racing car development. The P86 was the successor to the P85and was only slightly changed compared to this racing car. For aerodynamic reasons, the rear wheel arches of this Welter prototype were also completely covered; when changing tires, the covers could be folded up so that there was hardly any loss of time during pit stops. As a Peugeot designer, Gérard Welter had access to the Peugeot wind tunnel, which he made good use of to give the car an optimized body.

But the connection to Peugeot was primarily defined by the engine. The PRV engine originally developed for the series was adapted for racing. The only DOHC engines of this series ran in the welter cars. In 1986, the 2.8-liter V6 turbo engine produced about 550 hp.

Only one chassis of the P86 was built.

The P86 was used only twice, in 1986 and 1987 at the 24 Hours of Le Mans. 1986 drove Jean-Daniel Raulet, Michel Pignard, and François Migault the car with the starting number 41, which was reported in the C1 class and failed after 132 laps driven to engine failure. A year later, Welter competed with the driver trio of Raulet, Migault, and Pascal Pessiot. The car failed again, again due to engine failure.
