= Inaltéra GTP =

French racing car

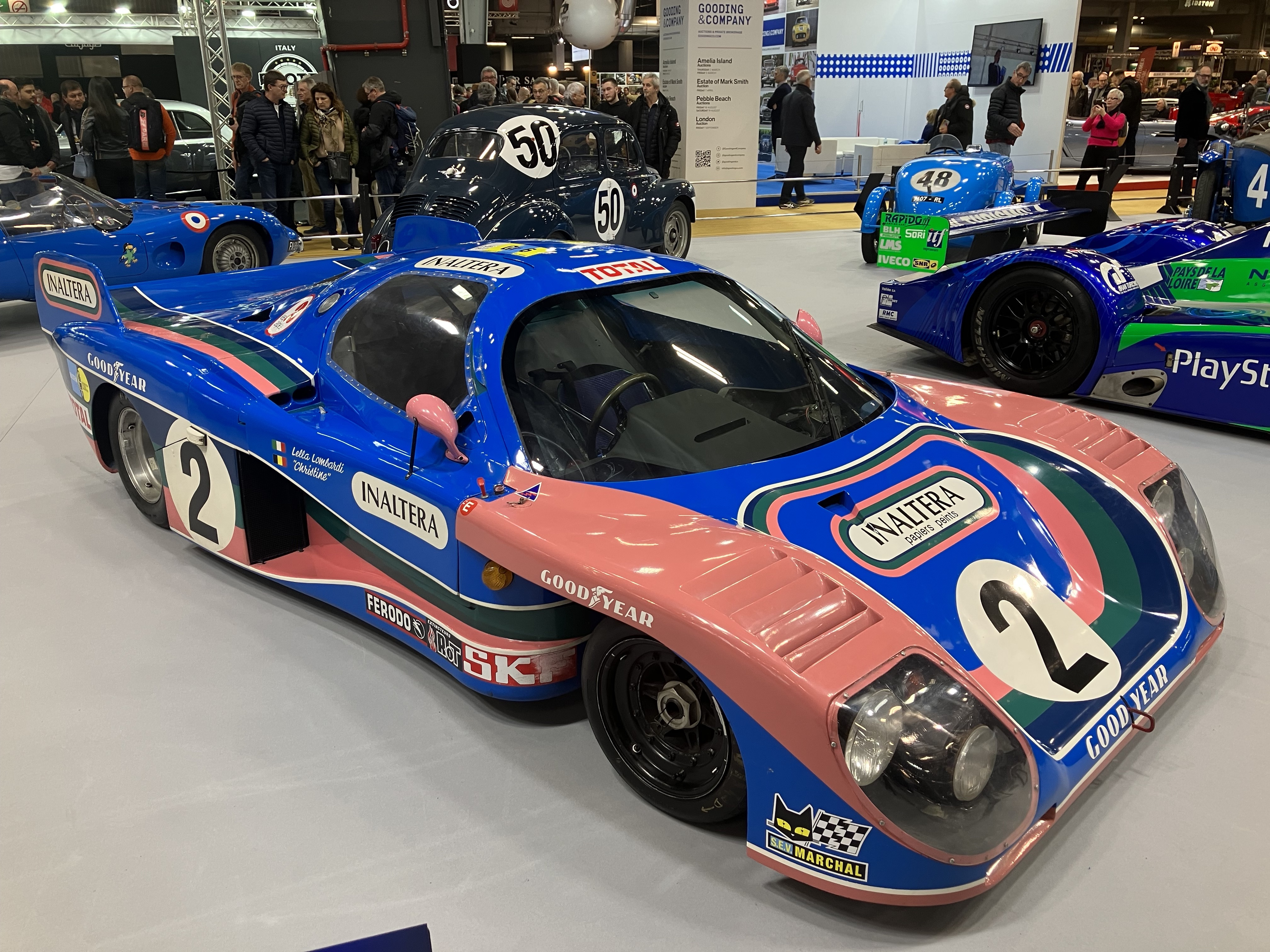
- Category: Group 6
- Constructor: Rondeau
- Designer: Jean Rondeau
- Successor: Rondeau M378

Technical specifications
- Chassis: Steel multi-tubular spaceframe, aluminum reinforcements, covered in fiberglass body
- Suspension: Double wishbones, coil springs over shock absorbers, anti-roll bar (front); Double wishbones, twin radius arms, coil springs over dampers (rear)
- Axle track: 1,445 mm (56.9 in) (front); 1,480 mm (58.3 in) (rear)
- Wheelbase: 2,490 mm (98.0 in)
- Engine: Ford-Cosworth DFV 3.0 L (183.1 cu in) V8, naturally-aspirated, mid-engined
- Transmission: Hewland LT 200 5-speed manual
- Power: 415 hp (309 kW)
- Weight: 815 kg (1,796.8 lb)

Competition history

The Inaltéra GTP is a Group 6 sports prototype race car, designed, developed and built by Automobiles Jean Rondeau in 1976.

== Development history and technology ==
It is the first car Jean Rondeau designed and developed and was completely built (except the engine) in Le Mans, where he himself was born. Its name, Inaltéra, comes from the name of a French wallpaper company that sponsored the team.

The chassis is an aluminum-reinforced steel multi-tubular spaceframe, covered in a fiberglass panel body. This meant it was very light, with the total weight coming to 815 kg (1,797 lb). It was powered by a 3.0 L (180 cu in), 415 hp (309 kW), Ford-Cosworth DFV V8 Formula One engine.This drove the rear wheels through a Hewland L.T. 200 five-speed manual transmission.

== Racing history ==
It competed in sports car racing between 1976 and 1978. Three cars were entered by Rondeau himself at the 1977 24 Hours of Le Mans where its best result was an overall 4th-place finish and 1st place of its GTP class. Only one car was entered at the 1978 24 Hours of Le Mans as the Inaltéra sponsorship was cut after the 1977 season and Rondeau had to sell his cars. The car finished 13th overall.
