= 1983 World Endurance Championship =

Racing tournament

1983 World Sportscar Championship

Seasons
- ← 1982 1984 →

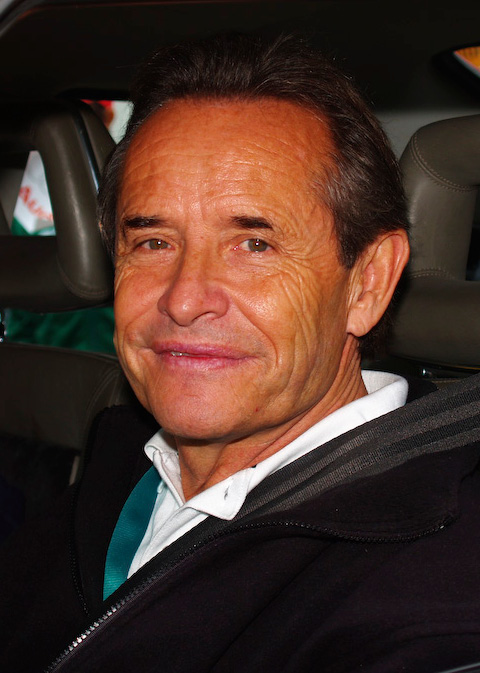
Jacky Ickx (pictured in 2007) won the World Endurance Championship for Drivers

The 1983 World Endurance Championship was the 31st season of FIA World Sportscar Championship auto racing series. It featured the two world championships and two cups for drivers and manufacturers which was contested by Group C Sports Cars, Group C Junior Sports Cars and Group B GT Cars in a seven race events which ran from 10 April to 10 December 1983. The World Endurance Championship for Drivers was won by Jacky Ickx while the World Endurance Championship for Manufacturers was won by Porsche. The Group C Junior Cup was won by Giannini Alba and the Grand Touring Cup by Porsche.

The world championship was held in conjunction with the 1983 European Endurance Championship, sharing five races events in Europe before the series departed internationally. As such, many drivers and teams competed in both championships.

== Schedule ==
All events covered a distance of 1,000 km (620 mi) with exception of the 24 Hours of Le Mans. The first five events were shared with the European Endurance Championship. The Monza round was shared with the Italian Championship Group 6, although their race lasted only 14 laps and the cars did not complete the full endurance race distance.

Round	Race	Circuit	Date
1	Trofeo Filippo Caracciolo	Autodromo Nazionale di Monza, Monza, Italy	10 April
2	Grand Prix International 1000 km	Silverstone Circuit, Silverstone, United Kingdom	8 May
3	Bitburger ADAC-1000-km-Rennen	Nürburgring, Nürburg, West Germany	29 May
4	24 Hours of Le Mans	Circuit de la Sarthe, Le Mans, France	18–19 June
5	Trophee Diners Club 1000 km Spa-Francorchamps	Circuit de Spa-Francorchamps, Stavelot, Belgium	4 September
6	World Endurance Championship in Japan	Fuji Speedway, Oyama, Japan	2 October
7	Castrol 1000	Kyalami Grand Prix Circuit, Midrand, South Africa	10 December

== Entries ==
=== Group C ===
Entrant	Car	Engine	Tyre	No.	Drivers	Rounds
(West Germany) Rothmans Porsche	Porsche 956	Porsche Type-935/76 2.6 L Turbo Flat-6	D	1	(Belgium) Jacky Ickx	All
(West Germany) Rothmans Porsche	Porsche 956	Porsche Type-935/76 2.6 L Turbo Flat-6	D	1	(West Germany) Jochen Mass	1–3, 5–7
(West Germany) Rothmans Porsche	Porsche 956	Porsche Type-935/76 2.6 L Turbo Flat-6	D	1	(United Kingdom) Derek Bell	4
(West Germany) Rothmans Porsche	Porsche 956	Porsche Type-935/76 2.6 L Turbo Flat-6	D	2	(United Kingdom) Derek Bell	1–3, 5–7
(West Germany) Rothmans Porsche	Porsche 956	Porsche Type-935/76 2.6 L Turbo Flat-6	D	2	(United States) Al Holbert	1
(West Germany) Rothmans Porsche	Porsche 956	Porsche Type-935/76 2.6 L Turbo Flat-6	D	2	(West Germany) Stefan Bellof	2–7
(West Germany) Rothmans Porsche	Porsche 956	Porsche Type-935/76 2.6 L Turbo Flat-6	D	2	(West Germany) Jochen Mass	4
(West Germany) Rothmans Porsche (Japan) Matsuda Collection	Porsche 956	Porsche Type-935/76 2.6 L Turbo Flat-6	D G	3	(Australia) Vern Schuppan	4, 7
(West Germany) Rothmans Porsche (Japan) Matsuda Collection	Porsche 956	Porsche Type-935/76 2.6 L Turbo Flat-6	D G	3	(United States) Al Holbert	4, 7
(West Germany) Rothmans Porsche (Japan) Matsuda Collection	Porsche 956	Porsche Type-935/76 2.6 L Turbo Flat-6	D G	3	(United States) Hurley Haywood	4
(West Germany) Rothmans Porsche (Japan) Matsuda Collection	Porsche 956	Porsche Type-935/76 2.6 L Turbo Flat-6	D G	3	(Belgium) Thierry Boutsen	6
(West Germany) Rothmans Porsche (Japan) Matsuda Collection	Porsche 956	Porsche Type-935/76 2.6 L Turbo Flat-6	D G	3	(France) Henri Pescarolo	6
(Italy) Martini Racing	Lancia LC2/83	Ferrari 268C 2.6 L Turbo V8	P D	4	(Italy) Michele Alboreto	1–4
(Italy) Martini Racing	Lancia LC2/83	Ferrari 268C 2.6 L Turbo V8	P D	4	(Italy) Riccardo Patrese	1–3, 5, 7
(Italy) Martini Racing	Lancia LC2/83	Ferrari 268C 2.6 L Turbo V8	P D	4	(Italy) Teo Fabi	4–5
(Italy) Martini Racing	Lancia LC2/83	Ferrari 268C 2.6 L Turbo V8	P D	4	(Italy) Alessandro Nannini	4, 7
(Italy) Martini Racing	Lancia LC2/83	Ferrari 268C 2.6 L Turbo V8	P D	5	(Italy) Piercarlo Ghinzani	1–2, 4–5, 7
(Italy) Martini Racing	Lancia LC2/83	Ferrari 268C 2.6 L Turbo V8	P D	5	(Italy) Teo Fabi	1–2, 4–5
(Italy) Martini Racing	Lancia LC2/83	Ferrari 268C 2.6 L Turbo V8	P D	5	(West Germany) Hans Heyer	4, 7
(Italy) Martini Racing	Lancia LC2/83	Ferrari 268C 2.6 L Turbo V8	P D	5	(Italy) Michele Alboreto	5
(Italy) Martini Racing	Lancia LC2/83	Ferrari 268C 2.6 L Turbo V8	P D	5	(Italy) Giorgio Pianta	7
(Italy) Martini Racing	Lancia LC2/83	Ferrari 268C 2.6 L Turbo V8	P D	6	(Italy) Alessandro Nannini	4
(Italy) Martini Racing	Lancia LC2/83	Ferrari 268C 2.6 L Turbo V8	P D	6	(Italy) Paolo Barilla	4
(Italy) Martini Racing	Lancia LC2/83	Ferrari 268C 2.6 L Turbo V8	P D	6	(France) Jean-Claude Andruet	4
(Italy) Euro TV-Mirabella Racing	Lancia LC2/83	Ferrari 268C 2.6 L Turbo V8	D	6	(Italy) Giorgio Francia	3, 5
(Italy) Euro TV-Mirabella Racing	Lancia LC2/83	Ferrari 268C 2.6 L Turbo V8	D	6	(Italy) Paolo Barilla	3, 5
(Italy) Euro TV-Mirabella Racing	Lancia LC2/83	Ferrari 268C 2.6 L Turbo V8	D	6	(Italy) Piercarlo Ghinzani	3
(Japan) Trust Racing Team	Porsche 956	Porsche Type-935/76 2.6 L Turbo Flat-6	D	6	(Australia) Vern Schuppan	6
(Japan) Trust Racing Team	Porsche 956	Porsche Type-935/76 2.6 L Turbo Flat-6	D	6	(Japan) Naohiro Fujita	6
(West Germany) Sorga S.A.	Porsche 956	Porsche Type-935/76 2.6 L Turbo Flat-6	D	8; 11	(France) Bob Wollek	1–5, 7
(West Germany) Sorga S.A.	Porsche 956	Porsche Type-935/76 2.6 L Turbo Flat-6	D	8; 11	(Belgium) Thierry Boutsen	1
(West Germany) Sorga S.A.	Porsche 956	Porsche Type-935/76 2.6 L Turbo Flat-6	D	8; 11	(Sweden) Stefan Johansson	2–5, 7
(West Germany) Sorga S.A.	Porsche 956	Porsche Type-935/76 2.6 L Turbo Flat-6	D	8; 11	(West Germany) Klaus Ludwig	4
(West Germany) Sorga S.A.	Porsche 956	Porsche Type-935/76 2.6 L Turbo Flat-6	D	8; 11	(Brazil) Chico Serra	7
(West Germany) Sorga S.A.	Porsche 956	Porsche Type-935/76 2.6 L Turbo Flat-6	D	12	(West Germany) Clemens Schickentanz	1–2, 4
(West Germany) Sorga S.A.	Porsche 956	Porsche Type-935/76 2.6 L Turbo Flat-6	D	12	(West Germany) Hans Heyer	1–2, 5–6
(West Germany) Sorga S.A.	Porsche 956	Porsche Type-935/76 2.6 L Turbo Flat-6	D	12	(West Germany) Rolf Stommelen	1
(West Germany) Sorga S.A.	Porsche 956	Porsche Type-935/76 2.6 L Turbo Flat-6	D	12	(West Germany) Volkert Merl	2, 4–6
(West Germany) Sorga S.A.	Porsche 956	Porsche Type-935/76 2.6 L Turbo Flat-6	D	12	(Colombia) Mauricio DeNarvaez	4
(West Germany) Sorga S.A.	Porsche 956	Porsche Type-935/76 2.6 L Turbo Flat-6	D	12	(France) Bob Wollek	5–7
(West Germany) Sorga S.A.	Porsche 956	Porsche Type-935/76 2.6 L Turbo Flat-6	D	12	(West Germany) Dieter Schornstein	7
(West Germany) Sorga S.A.	Porsche 956	Porsche Type-935/76 2.6 L Turbo Flat-6	D	12	(West Germany) "John Winter"	7
(West Germany) Joest Racing	Porsche 936C	Porsche Type-935 2.7 L Turbo Flat-6	D	15	(Belgium) Jean-Michel Martin	2, 4–5
(West Germany) Joest Racing	Porsche 936C	Porsche Type-935 2.7 L Turbo Flat-6	D	15	(Belgium) Marc Duez	2, 4
(West Germany) Joest Racing	Porsche 936C	Porsche Type-935 2.7 L Turbo Flat-6	D	15	(Belgium) Philippe Martin	2, 4
(West Germany) Joest Racing	Porsche 936C	Porsche Type-935 2.7 L Turbo Flat-6	D	15	(West Germany) "John Winter"	5
(West Germany) Joest Racing	Porsche 936C	Porsche Type-935 2.7 L Turbo Flat-6	D	15	(West Germany) Dieter Schornstein	5
(West Germany) Joest Racing	Porsche 936C	Porsche Type-935 2.7 L Turbo Flat-6	D	15	(West Germany) Leopold von Bayern	7
(West Germany) Joest Racing	Porsche 936C	Porsche Type-935 2.7 L Turbo Flat-6	D	15	(West Germany) Siegfried Brunn	7
(West Germany) Joest Racing	Porsche 936C	Porsche Type-935 2.7 L Turbo Flat-6	D	15	(South Africa) Klaus Grögor	7
(Japan) Hasemi Motorsport	Nissan Skyline Turbo C	Nissan LZ20B 2.0 L Turbo I4	D	10	(Japan) Masahiro Hasemi	6
(Japan) Hasemi Motorsport	Nissan Skyline Turbo C	Nissan LZ20B 2.0 L Turbo I4	D	10	(Japan) Kenji Tohira	6
(United Kingdom) John Fitzpatrick Racing	Porsche 956	Porsche Type-935/76 2.6 L Turbo Flat-6	G	11; 16	(United Kingdom) David Hobbs	All
(United Kingdom) John Fitzpatrick Racing	Porsche 956	Porsche Type-935/76 2.6 L Turbo Flat-6	G	11; 16	(United Kingdom) John Fitzpatrick	1–6
(United Kingdom) John Fitzpatrick Racing	Porsche 956	Porsche Type-935/76 2.6 L Turbo Flat-6	G	11; 16	(Austria) Dieter Quester	4
(United Kingdom) John Fitzpatrick Racing	Porsche 956	Porsche Type-935/76 2.6 L Turbo Flat-6	G	11; 16	(South Africa) Desiré Wilson	7
(United Kingdom) John Fitzpatrick Racing	Porsche 956	Porsche Type-935/76 2.6 L Turbo Flat-6	G	11; 16	(Belgium) Thierry Boutsen	7
(United Kingdom) John Fitzpatrick Racing	Porsche 956	Porsche Type-935/76 2.6 L Turbo Flat-6	G	16	(United Kingdom) Guy Edwards	4
(United Kingdom) John Fitzpatrick Racing	Porsche 956	Porsche Type-935/76 2.6 L Turbo Flat-6	G	16	(United Kingdom) Rupert Keegan	4
(United Kingdom) John Fitzpatrick Racing	Porsche 956	Porsche Type-935/76 2.6 L Turbo Flat-6	G	16	(United Kingdom) John Fitzpatrick	4
(United Kingdom) John Fitzpatrick Racing	Porsche 956	Porsche Type-935/76 2.6 L Turbo Flat-6	G	16	(South Africa) Sarel van der Merwe	7
(United Kingdom) John Fitzpatrick Racing	Porsche 956	Porsche Type-935/76 2.6 L Turbo Flat-6	G	16	(South Africa) Tony Martin	7
(United Kingdom) John Fitzpatrick Racing	Porsche 956	Porsche Type-935/76 2.6 L Turbo Flat-6	G	16	(South Africa) Graham Duxbury	7
(United States) Henn's T-Bird Swap Shop (United States) Alpha Racing	Porsche 956	Porsche Type-935/76 2.6 L Turbo Flat-6	G B	47; 48	(United States) Preston Henn	2, 4, 6
(United States) Henn's T-Bird Swap Shop (United States) Alpha Racing	Porsche 956	Porsche Type-935/76 2.6 L Turbo Flat-6	G B	47; 48	(United Kingdom) Rupert Keegan	2
(United States) Henn's T-Bird Swap Shop (United States) Alpha Racing	Porsche 956	Porsche Type-935/76 2.6 L Turbo Flat-6	G B	47; 48	(United Kingdom) Guy Edwards	2
(United States) Henn's T-Bird Swap Shop (United States) Alpha Racing	Porsche 956	Porsche Type-935/76 2.6 L Turbo Flat-6	G B	47; 48	(France) Jean-Louis Schlesser	4
(United States) Henn's T-Bird Swap Shop (United States) Alpha Racing	Porsche 956	Porsche Type-935/76 2.6 L Turbo Flat-6	G B	47; 48	(France) Claude Ballot-Léna	4
(United States) Henn's T-Bird Swap Shop (United States) Alpha Racing	Porsche 956	Porsche Type-935/76 2.6 L Turbo Flat-6	G B	47; 48	(United States) John Paul Jr.	6
(United States) Henn's T-Bird Swap Shop (United States) Alpha Racing	Porsche 956	Porsche Type-935/76 2.6 L Turbo Flat-6	G B	47; 48	(Japan) Kunimitsu Takahashi	6
(France) Yves Courage	Cougar C01B	Ford Cosworth DFL 3.3 L V8	M	13	(France) Yves Courage	4
(France) Yves Courage	Cougar C01B	Ford Cosworth DFL 3.3 L V8	M	13	(France) Michel Dubois	4
(France) Yves Courage	Cougar C01B	Ford Cosworth DFL 3.3 L V8	M	13	(United Kingdom) Alain de Cadenet	4
(United Kingdom) Canon Racing (South Africa) Team Gunston	Porsche 956	Porsche Type-935/76 2.6 L Turbo Flat-6	D	14	(Netherlands) Jan Lammers	1–5, 7
(United Kingdom) Canon Racing (South Africa) Team Gunston	Porsche 956	Porsche Type-935/76 2.6 L Turbo Flat-6	D	14	(United Kingdom) Richard Lloyd	1–2, 4
(United Kingdom) Canon Racing (South Africa) Team Gunston	Porsche 956	Porsche Type-935/76 2.6 L Turbo Flat-6	D	14	(United Kingdom) Tiff Needell	1
(United Kingdom) Canon Racing (South Africa) Team Gunston	Porsche 956	Porsche Type-935/76 2.6 L Turbo Flat-6	D	14	(Belgium) Thierry Boutsen	2, 5
(United Kingdom) Canon Racing (South Africa) Team Gunston	Porsche 956	Porsche Type-935/76 2.6 L Turbo Flat-6	D	14	(United Kingdom) Jonathan Palmer	3–4, 7
(United Kingdom) Canon Racing (South Africa) Team Gunston	Porsche 956	Porsche Type-935/76 2.6 L Turbo Flat-6	D	14	(Finland) Keke Rosberg	3
(Japan) Mazdaspeed	Mazda 717C	Mazda 13B 1.3 L 2-rotor	D	16	(Japan) Yojiro Terada	6
(Japan) Mazdaspeed	Mazda 717C	Mazda 13B 1.3 L 2-rotor	D	16	(Japan) Takashi Yorino	6
(Japan) Mazdaspeed	Mazda 717C	Mazda 13B 1.3 L 2-rotor	D	16	(Belgium) Pierre Dieudonné	6
(Japan) Tom's	TOM'S 83C	Toyota 4T-GTE 2.1 L Turbo I4	B	17	(Japan) Keiji Matsumoto	6
(Japan) Tom's	TOM'S 83C	Toyota 4T-GTE 2.1 L Turbo I4	B	17	(Japan) Kaoru Hoshino	6
(Japan) Tom's	TOM'S 83C	Toyota 4T-GTE 2.1 L Turbo I4	B	17	(Japan) Masanori Sekiya	6
(West Germany) Boss-Obermaier Racing	Porsche 956	Porsche Type-935/76 2.6 L Turbo Flat-6	D	18	(West Germany) Axel Plankenhorn	1–5
(West Germany) Boss-Obermaier Racing	Porsche 956	Porsche Type-935/76 2.6 L Turbo Flat-6	D	18	(West Germany) Jürgen Lässig	1–5
(West Germany) Boss-Obermaier Racing	Porsche 956	Porsche Type-935/76 2.6 L Turbo Flat-6	D	18	(West Germany) Jürgen Barth	1
(West Germany) Boss-Obermaier Racing	Porsche 956	Porsche Type-935/76 2.6 L Turbo Flat-6	D	18	(West Germany) Harold Grohs	2
(West Germany) Boss-Obermaier Racing	Porsche 956	Porsche Type-935/76 2.6 L Turbo Flat-6	D	18	(West Germany) Hans Heyer	3
(West Germany) Boss-Obermaier Racing	Porsche 956	Porsche Type-935/76 2.6 L Turbo Flat-6	D	18	(South Africa) Desiré Wilson	4
(West Germany) Boss-Obermaier Racing	Porsche 956	Porsche Type-935/76 2.6 L Turbo Flat-6	D	18	(Belgium) Hervé Regout	5
(United States) Cooke Racing	Lola T610	Ford Cosworth DFL 4.0 L V8	G	20	(United States) Ralph Kent-Cooke	4
(United States) Cooke Racing	Lola T610	Ford Cosworth DFL 4.0 L V8	G	20	(United States) Jim Adams	4
(United States) Cooke Racing	Lola T610	Ford Cosworth DFL 4.0 L V8	G	20	(France) François Servanin	4
(Japan) Central 20 Racing Team	Nissan LM03C	Nissan LZ20B 2.1 L Turbo I4	D	20	(Japan) Takao Wada	6
(Japan) Central 20 Racing Team	Nissan LM03C	Nissan LZ20B 2.1 L Turbo I4	D	20	(Japan) Haruhito Yanagida	6
(West Germany) Porsche Kremer Racing	Porsche 956	Porsche Type-935/76 2.6 L Turbo Flat-6	G B	21	(Australia) Vern Schuppan	2
(West Germany) Porsche Kremer Racing	Porsche 956	Porsche Type-935/76 2.6 L Turbo Flat-6	G B	21	(Australia) Alan Jones	2
(West Germany) Porsche Kremer Racing	Porsche 956	Porsche Type-935/76 2.6 L Turbo Flat-6	G B	21	(France) Philippe Alliot	4, 6
(West Germany) Porsche Kremer Racing	Porsche 956	Porsche Type-935/76 2.6 L Turbo Flat-6	G B	21	(United States) Mario Andretti	4
(West Germany) Porsche Kremer Racing	Porsche 956	Porsche Type-935/76 2.6 L Turbo Flat-6	G B	21	(United States) Michael Andretti	4
(West Germany) Porsche Kremer Racing	Porsche 956	Porsche Type-935/76 2.6 L Turbo Flat-6	G B	21	(United Kingdom) Derek Warwick	5
(West Germany) Porsche Kremer Racing	Porsche 956	Porsche Type-935/76 2.6 L Turbo Flat-6	G B	21	(Austria) Franz Konrad	5–6
(West Germany) Porsche Kremer Racing	Porsche 956	Porsche Type-935/76 2.6 L Turbo Flat-6	G B	21	(Sweden) Stefan Johansson	6
(West Germany) Porsche Kremer Racing	Kremer CK5	Porsche Type-935 3.0 L Turbo Flat-6	G	22	(United Kingdom) Derek Warwick	4
(West Germany) Porsche Kremer Racing	Kremer CK5	Porsche Type-935 3.0 L Turbo Flat-6	G	22	(West Germany) Frank Jelinski	4
(West Germany) Porsche Kremer Racing	Kremer CK5	Porsche Type-935 3.0 L Turbo Flat-6	G	22	(France) Patrick Gaillard	4
(West Germany) Porsche Kremer Racing	Kremer CK5	Porsche Type-935 3.0 L Turbo Flat-6	G	22	(Netherlands) Kees Kroesemeijer	5, 7
(West Germany) Porsche Kremer Racing	Kremer CK5	Porsche Type-935 3.0 L Turbo Flat-6	G	22	(Netherlands) Huub Rothengatter	5
(West Germany) Porsche Kremer Racing	Kremer CK5	Porsche Type-935 3.0 L Turbo Flat-6	G	22	(Austria) Franz Konrad	7
(West Germany) Porsche Kremer Racing	Kremer CK5	Porsche Type-935 3.0 L Turbo Flat-6	G	22	(South Africa) George Fouché	7
(Japan) Hoshino Racing	March 83G	Nissan LZ20B 2.1 L Turbo I4	B	23	(Japan) Kazuyoshi Hoshino	6
(Japan) Hoshino Racing	March 83G	Nissan LZ20B 2.1 L Turbo I4	B	23	(Japan) Akira Hagiwara	6
Ford France	Rondeau M482	Ford Cosworth DFL 4.0 L V8	M	24	(France) Henri Pescarolo	4
Ford France	Rondeau M482	Ford Cosworth DFL 4.0 L V8	M	24	(Belgium) Thierry Boutsen	4
Ford France	Rondeau M482	Ford Cosworth DFL 4.0 L V8	M	25	(France) Philippe Streiff	4
Ford France	Rondeau M482	Ford Cosworth DFL 4.0 L V8	M	25	(France) Jean-Pierre Jaussaud	4
Ford France	Rondeau M482	Ford Cosworth DFL 4.0 L V8	M	25	(France) Michel Ferté	4
Ford France	Rondeau M482	Ford Cosworth DFL 4.0 L V8	M	26	(France) Jean Rondeau	4
Ford France	Rondeau M482	Ford Cosworth DFL 4.0 L V8	M	26	(France) Alain Ferté	4
Ford France	Rondeau M482	Ford Cosworth DFL 4.0 L V8	M	26	(France) Michel Ferté	4
(France) Jean Rondeau	Rondeau M379C	Ford Cosworth DFV 3.0 L V8	M	28	(France) Anne-Charlotte Verney	4
(France) Jean Rondeau	Rondeau M379C	Ford Cosworth DFV 3.0 L V8	M	28	(France) Joël Gouhier	4
(France) Jean Rondeau	Rondeau M379C	Ford Cosworth DFV 3.0 L V8	M	28	(United Kingdom) Vic Elford	4
(France) Jean Rondeau	Rondeau M382	Ford Cosworth DFL 3.3 L V8	M	72	(France) Xavier Lapeyre	4
(France) Jean Rondeau	Rondeau M382	Ford Cosworth DFL 3.3 L V8	M	72	(France) Dany Snobeck	4
(France) Jean Rondeau	Rondeau M382	Ford Cosworth DFL 3.3 L V8	M	72	(France) Alain Cudini	4
(France) Christian Bussi	Rondeau M382	Ford Cosworth DFL 3.3 L V8	D	29	(Belgium) Pascal Witmeur	4
(France) Christian Bussi	Rondeau M382	Ford Cosworth DFL 3.3 L V8	D	29	(Belgium) Daniël Herregods	4
(France) Christian Bussi	Rondeau M382	Ford Cosworth DFL 3.3 L V8	D	29	(Belgium) Jean-Paul Libert	4
(France) Pierre Yver	Rondeau M382	Ford Cosworth DFL 3.3 L V8	D	30	(France) Pierre Yver	4
(France) Pierre Yver	Rondeau M382	Ford Cosworth DFL 3.3 L V8	D	30	(France) Lucien Guitteny	4
(France) Pierre Yver	Rondeau M382	Ford Cosworth DFL 3.3 L V8	D	30	(Belgium) Bernard de Dryver	4
(Switzerland) Brun Motorsport GmbH	Porsche 956	Porsche Type-935/76 2.6 L Turbo Flat-6	D Y	33; 8; 35	(West Germany) Hans-Joachim Stuck	5, 7
(Switzerland) Brun Motorsport GmbH	Porsche 956	Porsche Type-935/76 2.6 L Turbo Flat-6	D Y	33; 8; 35	(West Germany) Harald Grohs	5, 7
(Switzerland) Brun Motorsport GmbH	Porsche 956	Porsche Type-935/76 2.6 L Turbo Flat-6	D Y	33; 8; 35	(Switzerland) Walter Brun	5
(Switzerland) Brun Motorsport GmbH	Porsche 956	Porsche Type-935/76 2.6 L Turbo Flat-6	D Y	33; 8; 35	(West Germany) Clemens Schickentanz	6
(Switzerland) Brun Motorsport GmbH	Porsche 956	Porsche Type-935/76 2.6 L Turbo Flat-6	D Y	33; 8; 35	(Japan) Kenji Takahashi	6
(Switzerland) Brun Motorsport GmbH	Porsche 956	Porsche Type-935/76 2.6 L Turbo Flat-6	D Y	33; 8; 35	(Italy) Massimo Sigala	7
(Switzerland) Brun Motorsport GmbH	Porsche 956	Porsche Type-935/76 2.6 L Turbo Flat-6	D Y	33; 8; 35	(Italy) Umberto Grano	7
(Switzerland) Brun Motorsport GmbH	Sehcar SH C6	Ford Cosworth DFL 3.3 L V8	D	35; 36	(Switzerland) Walter Brun	2–3
(Switzerland) Brun Motorsport GmbH	Sehcar SH C6	Ford Cosworth DFL 3.3 L V8	D	35; 36	(West Germany) Hans-Joachim Stuck	2–3
(Switzerland) Brun Motorsport GmbH	Sehcar SH C6	Ford Cosworth DFL 3.3 L V8	D	35; 36	(Canada) Jacques Villeneuve, Sr.	4
(Switzerland) Brun Motorsport GmbH	Sehcar SH C6	Ford Cosworth DFL 3.3 L V8	D	35; 36	(Canada) Ludwig Heimrath Jr.	4
(Switzerland) Brun Motorsport GmbH	Sehcar SH C6	Ford Cosworth DFL 3.3 L V8	D	35; 36	(Canada) David Deacon	4
(Switzerland) Brun Motorsport GmbH	Sehcar C830	Porsche Type-935/76 2.6 L Turbo Flat-6	D	37	(Switzerland) Walter Brun	4
(Switzerland) Brun Motorsport GmbH	Sehcar C830	Porsche Type-935/76 2.6 L Turbo Flat-6	D	37	(West Germany) Hans-Joachim Stuck	4
(Switzerland) Brun Motorsport GmbH	Sehcar C830	Porsche Type-935/76 2.6 L Turbo Flat-6	D	37	(West Germany) Harald Grohs	4
(Switzerland) Cheetah Car	Cheetah G603	Ford Cosworth DFL 4.0 L V8		34	(Switzerland) Loris Kessel	5
(Switzerland) Cheetah Car	Cheetah G603	Ford Cosworth DFL 4.0 L V8		34	(France) Laurent Ferrier	5
(Switzerland) Cheetah Car	Cheetah G603	Ford Cosworth DFL 4.0 L V8		34	(France) Jean-Pierre Jaussaud	5
(Japan) Team Ikuzawa	TOM'S 83C	Toyota 4T-GTE 2.1 L Turbo I4	D	37	(United Kingdom) Geoff Lees	6
(Japan) Team Ikuzawa	TOM'S 83C	Toyota 4T-GTE 2.1 L Turbo I4	D	37	(Republic of Ireland) Derek Daly	6
(Japan) Team Ikuzawa	TOM'S 83C	Toyota 4T-GTE 2.1 L Turbo I4	D	37	(Japan) Toshio Suzuki	6
(Japan) Dome Racing (Japan) Autobacs Dome Motorsport	Dome RC82; Dome RC83	Ford Cosworth DFL 3.3 L V8	D	38; 7	(United Kingdom) Chris Craft	4
(Japan) Dome Racing (Japan) Autobacs Dome Motorsport	Dome RC82; Dome RC83	Ford Cosworth DFL 3.3 L V8	D	38; 7	(United Kingdom) Nick Mason	4
(Japan) Dome Racing (Japan) Autobacs Dome Motorsport	Dome RC82; Dome RC83	Ford Cosworth DFL 3.3 L V8	D	38; 7	(Chile) Eliseo Salazar	4
(Japan) Dome Racing (Japan) Autobacs Dome Motorsport	Dome RC82; Dome RC83	Ford Cosworth DFL 3.3 L V8	D	38; 7	(Sweden) Eje Elgh	6
(Japan) Dome Racing (Japan) Autobacs Dome Motorsport	Dome RC82; Dome RC83	Ford Cosworth DFL 3.3 L V8	D	38; 7	(United Kingdom) Tiff Needell	6
(United Kingdom) Viscount Downe with Pace Petroleum	Nimrod NRA/C2B	Aston Martin DP1229 5.3 L V8	A	39	(United Kingdom) Ray Mallock	2, 4–5
(United Kingdom) Viscount Downe with Pace Petroleum	Nimrod NRA/C2B	Aston Martin DP1229 5.3 L V8	A	39	(United Kingdom) Mike Salmon	2, 4–5
(United Kingdom) Viscount Downe with Pace Petroleum	Nimrod NRA/C2B	Aston Martin DP1229 5.3 L V8	A	39	(United States) Steve Earle	4
(United Kingdom) EMKA Productions Ltd.	EMKA C83/1	Aston Martin 5.3 L V8		41	(United Kingdom) Tiff Needell	2, 4
(United Kingdom) EMKA Productions Ltd.	EMKA C83/1	Aston Martin 5.3 L V8		41	(United Kingdom) Steve O'Rourke	2, 4
(United Kingdom) EMKA Productions Ltd.	EMKA C83/1	Aston Martin 5.3 L V8		41	(United Kingdom) Jeff Allam	2
(United Kingdom) EMKA Productions Ltd.	EMKA C83/1	Aston Martin 5.3 L V8		41	(United Kingdom) Nick Faure	4
(United Kingdom) Richard Cleare Racing	Kremer CK5	Porsche Type-935 3.0 L Turbo Flat-6		42; 19	(United Kingdom) Richard Cleare	1–2, 4
(United Kingdom) Richard Cleare Racing	Kremer CK5	Porsche Type-935 3.0 L Turbo Flat-6		42; 19	(United Kingdom) Tony Dron	1–2, 4
(United Kingdom) Richard Cleare Racing	Kremer CK5	Porsche Type-935 3.0 L Turbo Flat-6		42; 19	(United States) Margie Smith-Haas	1
(United Kingdom) Richard Cleare Racing	Kremer CK5	Porsche Type-935 3.0 L Turbo Flat-6		42; 19	(United Kingdom) Richard Jones	4
(United Kingdom) Peer Racing	Ford C100	Ford Cosworth DFL 3.3 L V8	G	43; 10	(Republic of Ireland) Martin Birrane	4
(United Kingdom) Peer Racing	Ford C100	Ford Cosworth DFL 3.3 L V8	G	43; 10	(Republic of Ireland) David Kennedy	4
(United Kingdom) Peer Racing	Ford C100	Ford Cosworth DFL 3.3 L V8	G	43; 10	(France) François Migault	4
(West Germany) Jägermeister Ford Zakspeed Team	Zakspeed C1/4	Zakspeed 1.9 L Turbo I4	G	43	(West Germany) Klaus Niedzwiedz	5
(West Germany) Jägermeister Ford Zakspeed Team	Zakspeed C1/4	Zakspeed 1.9 L Turbo I4	G	43	(West Germany) Klaus Ludwig	5
Sauber Racing Switzerland	Sauber C7	BMW M88 3.5 L I6	D	47; 46	(United States) Tony Garcia	4
Sauber Racing Switzerland	Sauber C7	BMW M88 3.5 L I6	D	47; 46	(United States) Albert Naon	4
Sauber Racing Switzerland	Sauber C7	BMW M88 3.5 L I6	D	47; 46	(Colombia) Diego Montoya	4
Sauber Racing Switzerland	Sauber C7	BMW M88 3.5 L I6	D	47; 46	(Italy) Fulvio Ballabio	6
Sauber Racing Switzerland	Sauber C7	BMW M88 3.5 L I6	D	47; 46	(Switzerland) Max Welti	6
(United Kingdom) Grid Motor Racing Ltd.	Grid S1	Ford Cosworth DFL 4.0 L V8	F	49; 48	(United Kingdom) Dudley Wood	4
(United Kingdom) Grid Motor Racing Ltd.	Grid S1	Ford Cosworth DFL 4.0 L V8	F	49; 48	(United States) Fred Stiff	4
(United Kingdom) Grid Motor Racing Ltd.	Grid S1	Ford Cosworth DFL 4.0 L V8	F	49; 48	(United States) Ray Ratcliff	4
(Italy) Sivama/Grifone	Lancia LC1	Lancia 1.4 L Turbo I4	D	51; 22; 57	(Italy) Joe Castellano	1
(Italy) Sivama/Grifone	Lancia LC1	Lancia 1.4 L Turbo I4	D	51; 22; 57	(Italy) Luigi Moreschi	1
(Italy) Sivama/Grifone	Lancia LC1	Lancia 1.4 L Turbo I4	D	51; 22; 57	(Argentina) Oscar Larrauri	2–4
(Italy) Sivama/Grifone	Lancia LC1	Lancia 1.4 L Turbo I4	D	51; 22; 57	(Italy) Massimo Sigala	2–4
(Italy) Sivama/Grifone	Lancia LC1	Lancia 1.4 L Turbo I4	D	51; 22; 57	(Morocco) Max Cohen-Olivar	4
(Italy) Sivama/Grifone	Lancia LC1	Lancia 1.4 L Turbo I4	D	51; 22; 57	(Italy) Pasquale Barberio	7
(Italy) Sivama/Grifone	Lancia LC1	Lancia 1.4 L Turbo I4	D	51; 22; 57	(Italy) Mario Radicella	7
(Italy) Sivama/Grifone	Lancia LC1	Lancia 1.4 L Turbo I4	D	51; 22; 57	(Italy) Maurizio Gellini	7
(Italy) Sivama/Grifone	Lancia LC1	Lancia 1.4 L Turbo I4	D	52; 23; 58	(Italy) Duilio Truffo	1–2
(Italy) Sivama/Grifone	Lancia LC1	Lancia 1.4 L Turbo I4	D	52; 23; 58	(Italy) Roberto Sigala	1
(Italy) Sivama/Grifone	Lancia LC1	Lancia 1.4 L Turbo I4	D	52; 23; 58	(Italy) Joe Castellano	2
(Italy) Sivama/Grifone	Lancia LC1	Lancia 1.4 L Turbo I4	D	52; 23; 58	(Italy) Fausto Carello	7
(Italy) Sivama/Grifone	Lancia LC1	Lancia 1.4 L Turbo I4	D	52; 23; 58	(South Africa) Nicolo Bianco	7
(Italy) A.S. École Superieure de Tourisme	Lancia LC1	Lancia 1.4 L Turbo I4	D	53	(France) François Hesnault	4
(Italy) A.S. École Superieure de Tourisme	Lancia LC1	Lancia 1.4 L Turbo I4	D	53	(France) Thierry Perrier	4
(Italy) A.S. École Superieure de Tourisme	Lancia LC1	Lancia 1.4 L Turbo I4	D	53	(France) Bernard Salam	4
(United Kingdom) François Duret	De Cadenet LM	Ford Cosworth DFV 3.0 L V8		55	(United Kingdom) François Duret	2
(United Kingdom) François Duret	De Cadenet LM	Ford Cosworth DFV 3.0 L V8		55	(United Kingdom) Mike Wilds	2
(United Kingdom) François Duret	De Cadenet LM	Ford Cosworth DFV 3.0 L V8		55	(United Kingdom) Ian Harrower	2
(West Germany) Kannacher GT-Racing	URD C81	BMW M88 3.5 L I6	D	56; 54	(West Germany) Anton Fischhaber	3
(West Germany) Kannacher GT-Racing	URD C81	BMW M88 3.5 L I6	D	56; 54	(West Germany) Rolf Gätz	3
(West Germany) Kannacher GT-Racing	URD C81	BMW M88 3.5 L I6	D	56; 54	(West Germany) Peter Kroeber	3
(West Germany) Kannacher GT-Racing	URD C81	BMW M88 3.5 L I6	D	56; 54	(France) Bruno Sotty	4–5
(West Germany) Kannacher GT-Racing	URD C81	BMW M88 3.5 L I6	D	56; 54	(France) Gérard Cuynet	4–5
(West Germany) Kannacher GT-Racing	URD C81	BMW M88 3.5 L I6	D	56; 54	(France) Christian Baldino	4
(West Germany) Kannacher GT-Racing	URD C81	BMW M88 3.5 L I6	D	56; 54	(France) Valentin Bertapelle	5
(West Germany) Kannacher GT-Racing	URD C83	Porsche Type-935 3.0 L Turbo Flat-6	D	57	(West Germany) Jürgen Kannacher	5
(West Germany) Kannacher GT-Racing	URD C83	Porsche Type-935 3.0 L Turbo Flat-6	D	57	(West Germany) Wolfgang Boller	5
(West Germany) Kannacher GT-Racing	URD C83	Porsche Type-935 3.0 L Turbo Flat-6	D	57	(Austria) Walter Lechner	5
(Italy) Maurizio Micangeli	De Tomaso Pantera C	Ford 5.7 L V8	D	21; 59	(Italy) Carlo Pietromarchi	1
(Italy) Maurizio Micangeli	De Tomaso Pantera C	Ford 5.7 L V8	D	21; 59	(Italy) Maurizio Micangeli	1

=== Group C Junior ===
Entrant	Car	Engine	Tyre	No.	Drivers	Rounds
(Japan) Mazdaspeed	Mazda 717C	Mazda 13B 1.3 L 2-Rotor	D	60	(Japan) Yojiro Terada	2, 4
(Japan) Mazdaspeed	Mazda 717C	Mazda 13B 1.3 L 2-Rotor	D	60	(United Kingdom) Pete Lovett	2
(Japan) Mazdaspeed	Mazda 717C	Mazda 13B 1.3 L 2-Rotor	D	60	(Japan) Yoshimi Katayama	4
(Japan) Mazdaspeed	Mazda 717C	Mazda 13B 1.3 L 2-Rotor	D	60	(Japan) Takashi Yorino	4
(Japan) Mazdaspeed	Mazda 717C	Mazda 13B 1.3 L 2-Rotor	D	61	(United Kingdom) Jeff Allam	4
(Japan) Mazdaspeed	Mazda 717C	Mazda 13B 1.3 L 2-Rotor	D	61	(United Kingdom) Steve Soper	4
(Japan) Mazdaspeed	Mazda 717C	Mazda 13B 1.3 L 2-Rotor	D	61	(United Kingdom) James Weaver	4
(United Kingdom) Manns Racing	Harrier RX83C	Mazda 13B 1.3 L 2-Rotor	A	62; 51	(United Kingdom) Roy Baker	1–2, 4–5
(United Kingdom) Manns Racing	Harrier RX83C	Mazda 13B 1.3 L 2-Rotor	A	62; 51	(United Kingdom) Les Blackburn	1
(United Kingdom) Manns Racing	Harrier RX83C	Mazda 13B 1.3 L 2-Rotor	A	62; 51	(United Kingdom) David Palmer	2, 4–5
(United Kingdom) Manns Racing	Harrier RX83C	Mazda 13B 1.3 L 2-Rotor	A	62; 51	(United States) Pierre Honegger	4
(Japan) Alpha Cubic Racing Team	MCS Guppy	Mazda 13B 1.3 L 2-Rotor	D	62	(Japan) Chiyomi Totani	6
(Japan) Alpha Cubic Racing Team	MCS Guppy	Mazda 13B 1.3 L 2-Rotor	D	62	(Japan) Taku Akaike	6
(Italy) Jolly Club (Italy) Vesuvio Racing SRL	Alba AR2	Giannini 1.8 L Turbo I4	P	63	(Italy) Carlo Facetti	2–6
(Italy) Jolly Club (Italy) Vesuvio Racing SRL	Alba AR2	Giannini 1.8 L Turbo I4	P	63	(Italy) Martino Finotto	2–6
(Italy) Jolly Club (Italy) Vesuvio Racing SRL	Alba AR2	Giannini 1.8 L Turbo I4	P	63	(Switzerland) Marco Vanoli	4, 7
(Italy) Jolly Club (Italy) Vesuvio Racing SRL	Alba AR2	Giannini 1.8 L Turbo I4	P	63	(Italy) Guido Daccò	7
(Italy) Jolly Club (Italy) Vesuvio Racing SRL	Alba AR2	Giannini 1.8 L Turbo I4	P	64	(Italy) Carlo Facetti	7
(Italy) Jolly Club (Italy) Vesuvio Racing SRL	Alba AR2	Giannini 1.8 L Turbo I4	P	64	(Italy) Martino Finotto	7
(Italy) Jolly Club (Italy) Vesuvio Racing SRL	Alba AR2	Giannini 1.8 L Turbo I4	P	64	(Italy) Massimo Faraci	7
(France) Hubert Striebig	Sthemo SM01	BMW M12 2.2 L I4		64	(France) Hubert Striebig	4
(France) Hubert Striebig	Sthemo SM01	BMW M12 2.2 L I4		64	(France) Jacques Heuclin	4
(France) Hubert Striebig	Sthemo SM01	BMW M12 2.2 L I4		64	(France) Noël del Bello	4
(United Kingdom) François Duret	De Cadenet LM	Ford Cosworth DFV 3.0 L V8		65	(United Kingdom) François Duret	4
(United Kingdom) François Duret	De Cadenet LM	Ford Cosworth DFV 3.0 L V8		65	(United Kingdom) John Sheldon	4
(United Kingdom) François Duret	De Cadenet LM	Ford Cosworth DFV 3.0 L V8		65	(United Kingdom) Ian Harrower	4
(Japan) Auto Beaurex Motorsport	Lotec M1C	BMW M88 3.5 L I6	D	65	(Japan) Keiichi Suzuki	6
(Japan) Auto Beaurex Motorsport	Lotec M1C	BMW M88 3.5 L I6	D	65	(Japan) Naoki Nagasaka	6
(Japan) Auto Beaurex Motorsport	Lotec M1C	BMW M88 3.5 L I6	D	65	(West Germany) Kurt Lotterschmid	6
(West Germany) Rolf Götz	Rieger CJ 84	Ford Cosworth DFV 3.0 L V8	G	66	(West Germany) Rolf Götz	7
(West Germany) Rolf Götz	Rieger CJ 84	Ford Cosworth DFV 3.0 L V8	G	66	(West Germany) Siegfried Rieger	7
(South Africa) Tiga	Tiga SC83	Mazda 12A 1.1 L 2-rotor		67	(South Africa) Trevor von Rooyen	7
(South Africa) Tiga	Tiga SC83	Mazda 12A 1.1 L 2-rotor		67	(South Africa) Peter Morrison	7
(South Africa) Tiga	Tiga SC83	Mazda 12A 1.1 L 2-rotor		68	(South Africa) Wayne Taylor	7
(South Africa) Tiga	Tiga SC83	Mazda 12A 1.1 L 2-rotor		68	(South Africa) Lew Baker	7
(Japan) Misaki Speed	MCS Guppy	Toyota 4T-GT 2.1 L Turbo I4	D	81	(Japan) Kiyoshi Misaki	6
(Japan) Misaki Speed	MCS Guppy	Toyota 4T-GT 2.1 L Turbo I4	D	81	(Japan) Masakozu Nakamura	6
Panasport Japan	MCS Guppy	BMW M12 2.0 L I4	B	88	(Japan) Aguri Suzuki	6
Panasport Japan	MCS Guppy	BMW M12 2.0 L I4	B	88	(Japan) Toshio Motohashi	6

=== Group B ===
The Nürburgring round allowed additional Group B entries meeting the under 2,000 cc (120 cu in) regulations to compete but they were not eligible for championship points and are therefore not listed here.

Entrant	Car	Engine	Tyre	No.	Drivers	Rounds
(Sweden) Strandell	Porsche 930	Porsche 3.3 L Turbo Flat-6		74	(Sweden) Tomas Wiren	7
(Sweden) Strandell	Porsche 930	Porsche 3.3 L Turbo Flat-6		74	(Sweden) Kenneth Leim	7
(Switzerland) Scuderia Chico d'Or	Porsche 930	Porsche 3.3 L Turbo Flat-6		75	(Switzerland) Olindo Del-Thé	7
(Switzerland) Scuderia Chico d'Or	Porsche 930	Porsche 3.3 L Turbo Flat-6		75	(Switzerland) Mario Regusci	7
(West Germany) Bernd Schiller	Porsche 930	Porsche 3.3 L Turbo Flat-6	M	81; 98; 94; 73	(West Germany) Bernd Schiller	1–2, 4
(West Germany) Bernd Schiller	Porsche 930	Porsche 3.3 L Turbo Flat-6	M	81; 98; 94; 73	(West Germany) Günter Steckkönig	1–2, 4
(West Germany) Bernd Schiller	Porsche 930	Porsche 3.3 L Turbo Flat-6	M	81; 98; 94; 73	(Switzerland) Claude Haldi	4
(West Germany) Bernd Schiller	Porsche 930	Porsche 3.3 L Turbo Flat-6	M	81; 98; 94; 73	(West Germany) Wolfgang Braun	7
(West Germany) Bernd Schiller	Porsche 930	Porsche 3.3 L Turbo Flat-6	M	81; 98; 94; 73	(South Africa) Charles Brittz	7
(Denmark) Jens Winther Team Castrol	BMW M1	BMW M88 3.5 L I6	D A	82; 89; 103; 72	(Denmark) Jens Winther	1–5, 7
(Denmark) Jens Winther Team Castrol	BMW M1	BMW M88 3.5 L I6	D A	82; 89; 103; 72	(West Germany) Wolfgang Braun	1–3, 5
(Denmark) Jens Winther Team Castrol	BMW M1	BMW M88 3.5 L I6	D A	82; 89; 103; 72	(United Kingdom) David Mercer	2, 5
(Denmark) Jens Winther Team Castrol	BMW M1	BMW M88 3.5 L I6	D A	82; 89; 103; 72	(West Germany) Frank Jelinski	3
(Denmark) Jens Winther Team Castrol	BMW M1	BMW M88 3.5 L I6	D A	82; 89; 103; 72	(Switzerland) Angelo Pallavinci	4
(Denmark) Jens Winther Team Castrol	BMW M1	BMW M88 3.5 L I6	D A	82; 89; 103; 72	(West Germany) Leopold von Bayern	4
(Denmark) Jens Winther Team Castrol	BMW M1	BMW M88 3.5 L I6	D A	82; 89; 103; 72	(Denmark) Lars-Viggo Jensen	7
(West Germany) Georg Memminger	Porsche 930	Porsche 3.3 L Turbo Flat-6	D	83; 92; 110	(West Germany) Georg Memminger	1–5
(West Germany) Georg Memminger	Porsche 930	Porsche 3.3 L Turbo Flat-6	D	83; 92; 110	(West Germany) Heinz Kunh-Weiss	1–5
(West Germany) Georg Memminger	Porsche 930	Porsche 3.3 L Turbo Flat-6	D	83; 92; 110	(West Germany) Günter Steckkönig	3
(West Germany) Georg Memminger	Porsche 930	Porsche 3.3 L Turbo Flat-6	D	83; 92; 110	(West Germany) Fritz Müller	4
(Italy) Giuseppe Arlotti	Porsche 930	Porsche 3.3 L Turbo Flat-6		84	(Italy) Luigi Colzani	1
(Italy) Giuseppe Arlotti	Porsche 930	Porsche 3.3 L Turbo Flat-6		84	(Italy) Bruno Rebai	1
(France) Equipe Alméras Frères	Porsche 930	Porsche 3.3 L Turbo Flat-6	M	85; 95	(France) Jean-Marie Alméras	1–2, 4
(France) Equipe Alméras Frères	Porsche 930	Porsche 3.3 L Turbo Flat-6	M	85; 95	(France) Jacques Guillot	1–2, 4
(France) Equipe Alméras Frères	Porsche 930	Porsche 3.3 L Turbo Flat-6	M	85; 95	(France) Roland Biancone	1–2
(France) Equipe Alméras Frères	Porsche 930	Porsche 3.3 L Turbo Flat-6	M	85; 95	(France) Jacques Alméras	4
(West Germany) Racing Team Jürgensen GmbH	BMW M1	BMW M88 3.5 L I6	D	88; 105; 90; 70	(West Germany) Hans Christian Jürgensen	1–3, 5, 7
(West Germany) Racing Team Jürgensen GmbH	BMW M1	BMW M88 3.5 L I6	D	88; 105; 90; 70	(West Germany) Edgar Dören	1–3, 5, 7
(West Germany) Racing Team Jürgensen GmbH	BMW M1	BMW M88 3.5 L I6	D	88; 105; 90; 70	(Italy) Antoniella Mandelli	2
(West Germany) Racing Team Jürgensen GmbH	BMW M1	BMW M88 3.5 L I6	D	88; 105; 90; 70	(United Kingdom) Vic Elford	3
(West Germany) Racing Team Jürgensen GmbH	BMW M1	BMW M88 3.5 L I6	D	88; 105; 90; 70	(West Germany) Helmut Gall	7
(West Germany) Racing Team Jürgensen GmbH	Porsche 930	Porsche 3.3 L Turbo Flat-6	D	91; 106; 71	(West Germany) Helmut Gall	2–3
(West Germany) Racing Team Jürgensen GmbH	Porsche 930	Porsche 3.3 L Turbo Flat-6	D	91; 106; 71	(United States) Margie Smith-Haas	2
(West Germany) Racing Team Jürgensen GmbH	Porsche 930	Porsche 3.3 L Turbo Flat-6	D	91; 106; 71	(West Germany) Jürgen Hamelmann	3, 5
(West Germany) Racing Team Jürgensen GmbH	Porsche 930	Porsche 3.3 L Turbo Flat-6	D	91; 106; 71	(West Germany) Edgar Dören	3
(West Germany) Racing Team Jürgensen GmbH	Porsche 930	Porsche 3.3 L Turbo Flat-6	D	91; 106; 71	(France) Alexandre Yvon	4–5
(West Germany) Racing Team Jürgensen GmbH	Porsche 930	Porsche 3.3 L Turbo Flat-6	D	91; 106; 71	(France) Jean-Marie Lemerle	4
(West Germany) Racing Team Jürgensen GmbH	Porsche 930	Porsche 3.3 L Turbo Flat-6	D	91; 106; 71	(West Germany) Michael Krankenberg	4
(West Germany) Racing Team Jürgensen GmbH	Porsche 930	Porsche 3.3 L Turbo Flat-6	D	91; 106; 71	(France) Michel Lateste	7
(West Germany) Racing Team Jürgensen GmbH	Porsche 930	Porsche 3.3 L Turbo Flat-6	D	91; 106; 71	(West Germany) Axel Felder	7
(West Germany) Racing Team Jürgensen GmbH	Porsche 930	Porsche 3.3 L Turbo Flat-6	D	91; 106; 71	(West Germany) Peter Hähnlein	7
(United Kingdom) Charles Ivey Racing	Porsche 930	Porsche 3.3 L Turbo Flat-6	D A	93	(United Kingdom) Paul Smith	2, 4–5, 7
(United Kingdom) Charles Ivey Racing	Porsche 930	Porsche 3.3 L Turbo Flat-6	D A	93	(United Kingdom) John Cooper	2, 4–5, 7
(United Kingdom) Charles Ivey Racing	Porsche 930	Porsche 3.3 L Turbo Flat-6	D A	93	(United Kingdom) David Ovey	2, 4–5
(United Kingdom) Charles Ivey Racing	Porsche 930	Porsche 3.3 L Turbo Flat-6	D A	93	(South Africa) Giorgio Cavalieri	7
(France) Michel Lateste	Porsche 930	Porsche 3.3 L Turbo Flat-6	M	96	(France) Michel Lateste	4–5
(France) Michel Lateste	Porsche 930	Porsche 3.3 L Turbo Flat-6	M	96	(France) Michel Bienvault	4–5
(France) Michel Lateste	Porsche 930	Porsche 3.3 L Turbo Flat-6	M	96	(France) Raymond Touroul	4
(France) Raymond Boutinnaud	Porsche 928S	Porsche 4.7 L V8	D	97	(France) Raymond Boutinnaud	4
(France) Raymond Boutinnaud	Porsche 928S	Porsche 4.7 L V8	D	97	(France) Patrick Gonin	4
(France) Raymond Boutinnaud	Porsche 928S	Porsche 4.7 L V8	D	97	(France) Alain Le Page	4
(Belgium) EBRT	Porsche 930	Porsche 3.3 L Turbo Flat-6		98	(West Germany) Peter Reuter	5
(Belgium) EBRT	Porsche 930	Porsche 3.3 L Turbo Flat-6		98	(West Germany) Bruno Beilcke	5
(Belgium) EBRT	Porsche 930	Porsche 3.3 L Turbo Flat-6		98	(Belgium) Anton Hüweller	5
(Belgium) Maurice Dantinne	Ferrari 308 GTB LM	Ferrari 3.0 L V8		99	(Belgium) Maurice Dantinne	5
(Belgium) Maurice Dantinne	Ferrari 308 GTB LM	Ferrari 3.0 L V8		99	(Belgium) Pierre Vaillant	5
(Switzerland) Brun Motorsport GmbH	BMW M1	BMW M88 3.5 L I6		101	(West Germany) Harald Grohs	3
(Switzerland) Brun Motorsport GmbH	BMW M1	BMW M88 3.5 L I6		101	(West Germany) Leopold von Bayern	3
(Japan) Tomei Jidousha	Nissan 240RS	Nissan FJ24 2.4 L I4	D	102	(Japan) Eiji Shibuya	6
(Japan) Tomei Jidousha	Nissan 240RS	Nissan FJ24 2.4 L I4	D	102	(Japan) Fumio Aiba	6
(West Germany) Peter Reuter	Porsche 930	Porsche 3.3 L Turbo Flat-6		108	(West Germany) Peter Reuter	3
(West Germany) Peter Reuter	Porsche 930	Porsche 3.3 L Turbo Flat-6		108	(West Germany) Franz-Richard Friebel	3
(West Germany) Peter Reuter	Porsche 930	Porsche 3.3 L Turbo Flat-6		108	(West Germany) Hermann-Peter Duge	3
(West Germany) Bergischer M.C. Wuppertal	Porsche 924 Carrera GTS	Porsche 2.0 L Turbo I4		109	(West Germany) Wolf-Georg van Staerh	3
(West Germany) Bergischer M.C. Wuppertal	Porsche 924 Carrera GTS	Porsche 2.0 L Turbo I4		109	(West Germany) Ulli Richter	3
(West Germany) Helge Probst	Porsche 928S	Porsche 4.7 L V8		111; 97	(West Germany) Helge Probst	3, 5
(West Germany) Helge Probst	Porsche 928S	Porsche 4.7 L V8		111; 97	(West Germany) Norbert Haug	3, 5
(West Germany) Helge Probst	Porsche 928S	Porsche 4.7 L V8		111; 97	(West Germany) Wolfgang Walter	3
(West Germany) Helge Probst	Porsche 928S	Porsche 4.7 L V8		111; 97	(West Germany) Knuth Mentel	5
(West Germany) Mich Opel Tuning	Opel Ascona 400	Opel 2.4 L I4		112	(West Germany) Karl-Heinz Schäfer	3
(West Germany) Mich Opel Tuning	Opel Ascona 400	Opel 2.4 L I4		112	(West Germany) Karl-Heinz Gürthler	3
(West Germany) Autax Motor+Sport	Porsche 924 Carrera GTS	Porsche 2.0 L Turbo I4		113	(West Germany) Klaus Utz	3
(West Germany) Autax Motor+Sport	Porsche 924 Carrera GTS	Porsche 2.0 L Turbo I4		113	(Switzerland) Claude Haldi	3

== Results and standings ==
=== Race results ===
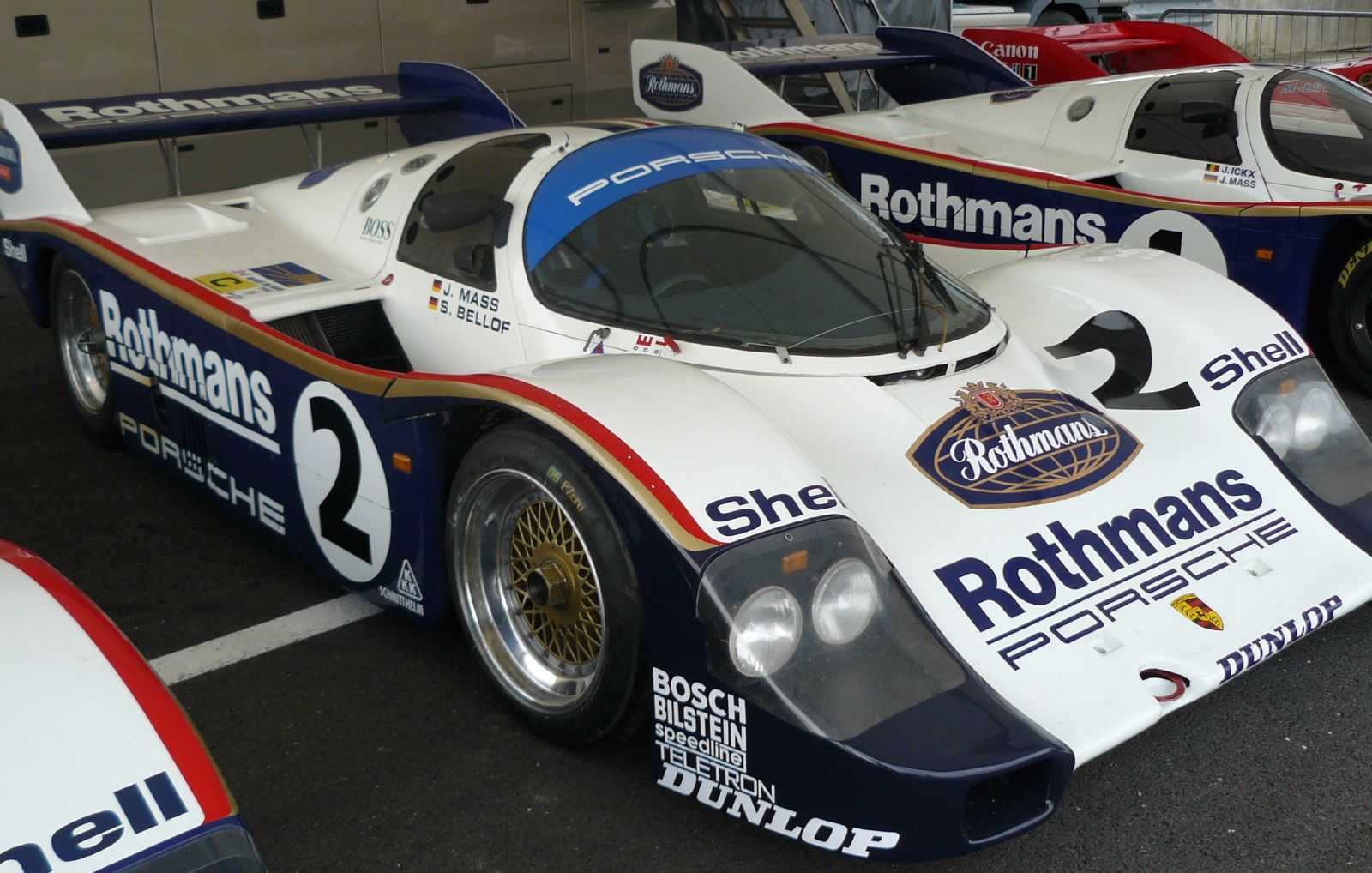
Rothmans Porsche won six of the seven races, including the 24 Hours of Le Mans, with the Porsche 956

Rnd	Circuit	Outright winning team	Group C Junior winning team	Group B winning team	Reports
Rnd	Circuit	Outright winning drivers	Group C Junior winning drivers	Group B winning drivers	Reports
1	Monza	(West Germany) No. 11 Sorga S.A	No finishers	(West Germany) No. 88 Racing Team Jürgensen GmbH	Report
1	Monza	(France) Bob Wollek (Belgium) Thierry Boutsen	No finishers	(West Germany) Hans Christian Jürgensen (West Germany) Edgar Dören	Report
2	Silverstone	(West Germany) No. 2 Rothmans Porsche	(Italy) No. 63 Jolly Club	(United Kingdom) No. 89 Jens Winther Team Castrol	Report
2	Silverstone	(United Kingdom) Derek Bell (West Germany) Stefan Bellof	(Italy) Carlo Facetti (Italy) Martino Finotto	(Denmark) Jens Winther (West Germany) Wolfgang Braun (United Kingdom) David Mercer	Report
3	Nürburgring	(West Germany) No. 1 Rothmans Porsche	(Italy) No. 63 Jolly Club	(West Germany) No. 106 Racing Team Jürgensen GmbH	Report
3	Nürburgring	(West Germany) Jochen Mass (Belgium) Jacky Ickx	(Italy) Carlo Facetti (Italy) Martino Finotto	(West Germany) Edgar Dören (West Germany) Helmut Gall (West Germany) Jürgen Hamelmann	Report
4	Le Mans	(West Germany) No. 3 Rothmans Porsche	(Japan) No. 60 Mazdaspeed	(United Kingdom) No. 93 Charles Ivey Racing	Report
4	Le Mans	(Australia) Vern Schuppan (United States) Al Holbert (United States) Hurley Haywood	(Japan) Yojiro Terada (Japan) Takashi Yorino (Japan) Yoshimi Katayama	(United Kingdom) John Cooper (United Kingdom) Paul Smith (United Kingdom) David Ovey	Report
5	Spa-Francorchamps	(West Germany) No. 1 Rothmans Porsche	(United Kingdom) No. 62 Manns Racing	(Denmark) No. 89 Jens Winther Team Castrol	Report
5	Spa-Francorchamps	(West Germany) Jochen Mass (Belgium) Jacky Ickx	(United Kingdom) Roy Baker (United Kingdom) David Palmer	(Denmark) Jens Winther (West Germany) Frank Jelinski (United Kingdom) David Mercer	Report
6	Fuji	(West Germany) No. 2 Rothmans Porsche	(Japan) No. 81 Misaki Speed	No finishers	Report
6	Fuji	(United Kingdom) Derek Bell (West Germany) Stefan Bellof	(Japan) Kyoshi Misaki (Japan) Masakazu Nakamura	No finishers	Report
7	Kyalami	(West Germany) No. 2 Rothmans Porsche	(Italy) No. 64 Vesuvio Racing SRL	(Denmark) No. 72 Jens Winther Team Castrol	Report
7	Kyalami	(United Kingdom) Derek Bell (West Germany) Stefan Bellof	(Italy) Martino Finotto (Italy) Carlo Facetti (Italy) Massimo Faraci	(Denmark) Jens Winther (Denmark) Lars-Viggo Jensen	Report

Points system
1st	2nd	3rd	4th	5th	6th	7th	8th	9th	10th	Group C Junior Bonus	Group B Bonus
20	15	12	10	8	6	4	3	2	1	2	3

In order to be classified for points, a team had to complete 90% of the winner's distance. Further, drivers were required to complete at least 30% of their car's total race distance to qualify for championship points. Group C Junior and Group B drivers earned extra championship points for any finish within the overall top ten positions.

=== World Endurance Championship for Drivers ===
Pos.	Driver	Team	MON (Italy)	SIL (United Kingdom)	NUR (West Germany)	LMS (France)	SPA (Belgium)	FUJ (Japan)	KYA (South Africa)	Total points
1	(Belgium) Jacky Ickx	(West Germany) Rothmans Porsche	2	Ret	1	2	1	2	3	97
2	(United Kingdom) Derek Bell	(West Germany) Rothmans Porsche	7	1	Ret	2	2	1	1	94
3	(West Germany) Jochen Mass	(West Germany) Rothmans Porsche	2	Ret	1	Ret	1	2	3	82
4	(West Germany) Stefan Bellof	(West Germany) Rothmans Porsche		1	Ret	Ret	2	1	1	75
5	(France) Bob Wollek	(West Germany) Sorga S.A.	1	2	2	6	Ret	5	4	64
6	(Belgium) Thierry Boutsen	(West Germany) Sorga S.A.	1							44
6	(Belgium) Thierry Boutsen	(United Kingdom) Canon Racing		3			9			44
6	(Belgium) Thierry Boutsen	Ford France				Ret				44
6	(Belgium) Thierry Boutsen	(Japan) Matsuda Collection						4		44
6	(Belgium) Thierry Boutsen	(United Kingdom) John Fitzpatrick Racing							Ret	44
7	(Netherlands) Jan Lammers	(United Kingdom) Canon Racing	6	3	3	8	9		5	43
8	(West Germany) Jürgen Lässig	(West Germany) Boss-Obermaier Racing	4	4	4	7	5			42
8	(West Germany) Axel Plankenhorn	(West Germany) Boss-Obermaier Racing	4	4	4	7	5			42
10	(Australia) Vern Schuppan	(West Germany) Porsche Kremer Racing		5						40
10	(Australia) Vern Schuppan	(West Germany) Rothmans Porsche				1			Ret	40
10	(Australia) Vern Schuppan	(Japan) Trust Racing Team						3		40
11	(Sweden) Stefan Johansson	(West Germany) Sorga S.A.		2	2	6	Ret		Ret	36
11	(Sweden) Stefan Johansson	(West Germany) Porsche Kremer Racing						Ret		36
12	(West Germany) Hans Heyer	(West Germany) Sorga S.A.	3	Ret			Ret	5		30
12	(West Germany) Hans Heyer	(West Germany) Boss-Obermaier Racing			4					30
12	(West Germany) Hans Heyer	(Italy) Martini Racing				Ret			Ret	30
13	(United Kingdom) John Fitzpatrick	(United Kingdom) John Fitzpatrick Racing	5	8	6	5	3	DNS		29
13	(United Kingdom) David Hobbs	(United Kingdom) John Fitzpatrick Racing	5	8	6	Ret	3	DNS	Ret	29
15	(West Germany) Clemens Schickentanz	(West Germany) Sorga S.A.	3	Ret		4				28
15	(West Germany) Clemens Schickentanz	(Switzerland) Brun Motorsport GmbH						6		28
16	(United States) Al Holbert	(West Germany) Rothmans Porsche	7			1			Ret	24
17	(United Kingdom) Jonathan Palmer	(United Kingdom) Canon Racing			3	8			5	23
18	(Italy) Riccardo Patrese	(Italy) Martini Racing	9	Ret	Ret		7		2	21
19	(United States) Hurley Haywood	(West Germany) Rothmans Porsche				1				20
19	(West Germany) Harold Grohs	(West Germany) Boss-Obermaier Racing		4						20
19	(West Germany) Harold Grohs	(Switzerland) Brun Motorsport GmbH			Ret	DNS	4		Ret	20
21	(West Germany) Volkert Merl	(West Germany) Sorga S.A.		Ret		4	Ret	5		18
22	(Italy) Alessandro Nannini	(Italy) Martini Racing				Ret			2	15
23	(West Germany) Dieter Schornstein	(West Germany) Sorga S.A.					8		4	13
23	(West Germany) "John Winter"	(West Germany) Joest Racing		Ret		Ret	8		4	13
25	(West Germany) Rolf Stommelen	(West Germany) Sorga S.A.	3							12
25	(Finland) Keke Rosberg	(United Kingdom) Canon Racing			3					12
25	(France) Philippe Alliot	(West Germany) Porsche Kremer Racing				3		Ret		12
25	(United States) Mario Andretti	(West Germany) Porsche Kremer Racing				3				12
25	(United States) Michael Andretti	(West Germany) Porsche Kremer Racing				3				12
25	(Japan) Naohiro Fujita	(Japan) Trust Racing Team						3		12
31	(West Germany) Edgar Dören	(West Germany) Racing Team Jürgensen GmbH	10	11	7		15			11
32	(West Germany) Jürgen Barth	(West Germany) Boss-Obermaier Racing	4							10
32	(Colombia) Mauricio DeNervaez	(West Germany) Sorga S.A.				4				10
32	(West Germany) Hans-Joachim Stuck	(Switzerland) Brun Motorsport GmbH		Ret	Ret	DNS	4		Ret	10
32	(Switzerland) Walter Brun	(Switzerland) Brun Motorsport GmbH		Ret	Ret	DNS	4			10
32	(France) Henri Pescarolo	Ford France				Ret				10
32	(France) Henri Pescarolo	(Japan) Matsuda Collection						4		10
32	(Denmark) Jens Winther	(Denmark) Jens Winther Team Castrol	11	10	Ret	Ret	12		8	10
38	(United Kingdom) Richard Lloyd	(United Kingdom) Canon Racing	6	DNS		8				9
39	(Australia) Alan Jones	(West Germany) Porsche Kremer Racing		5						8
39	(Italy) Massimo Sigala	(Italy) Sivama/Grifone		Ret	5	NC				8
39	(Italy) Massimo Sigala	(Switzerland) Brun Motorsport GmbH							Ret	8
39	(Argentina) Oscar Larrauri	(Italy) Sivama/Grifone		Ret	5	NC				8
39	(United Kingdom) Guy Edwards	(United Kingdom) John Fitzpatrick Racing		Ret		5				8
39	(United Kingdom) Rupert Keegan	(United Kingdom) John Fitzpatrick Racing		Ret		5				8
39	(Belgium) Hervé Regout	(West Germany) Boss-Obermaier Racing					5			8
45	(West Germany) Helmut Gall	(West Germany) Racing Team Jürgensen GmbH		DNS	7		Ret		DSQ	7
45	(West Germany) Jürgen Hamelmann	(West Germany) Racing Team Jürgensen GmbH			7		15			7
47	(United Kingdom) Tiff Needell	(United Kingdom) Canon Racing	6							6
47	(United Kingdom) Tiff Needell	(United Kingdom) EMKA Productions Ltd.		Ret		17				6
47	(United Kingdom) Tiff Needell	(Japan) Autobacs Dome Motorsport						NC		6
47	(United Kingdom) Richard Cleare	(United Kingdom) Richard Cleare Racing	Ret	6		Ret				6
47	(United Kingdom) Tony Dron	(United Kingdom) Richard Cleare Racing	Ret	6		Ret				6
47	(Switzerland) Claude Haldi	(West Germany) Autax Motor+Sport			8					6
47	(Switzerland) Claude Haldi	(West Germany) Bernd Schiller				Ret				6
47	(West Germany) Klaus Utz	(West Germany) Autax Motor+Sport			8					6
47	(Italy) Paolo Barilla	(Italy) Euro TV-Mirabella Racing			Ret		6			6
47	(Italy) Paolo Barilla	(Italy) Martini Racing				Ret				6
47	(Italy) Giorgio Francia	(Italy) Euro TV-Mirabella Racing			Ret		6			6
47	(Japan) Kenji Takahashi	(Switzerland) Brun Motorsport GmbH						6		6
47	(South Africa) Sarel van der Merwe	(United Kingdom) John Fitzpatrick Racing							6	6
47	(South Africa) Graham Duxbury	(United Kingdom) John Fitzpatrick Racing							6	6
47	(South Africa) Sarel van der Merwe	(United Kingdom) John Fitzpatrick Racing							6	6
47	(Denmark) Lars-Viggo Jensen	(Denmark) Jens Winther Team Castrol							8	6
59	(Japan) Kiyoshi Misaki	(Japan) Misaki Speed						8		5
59	(Japan) Masakozu Nakamura	(Japan) Misaki Speed						8		5
59	(Sweden) Kenneth Leim	(Sweden) Strandell							9	5
59	(Sweden) Tomas Wiren	(Sweden) Strandell							9	5
63	(West Germany) Hans Christian Jürgensen	(West Germany) Racing Team Jürgensen GmbH	10	11	DNS		Ret		DNS	4
63	(United Kingdom) Ray Mallock	(United Kingdom) Viscount Downe with Pace Petroleum		7		Ret				4
63	(United Kingdom) Mike Salmon	(United Kingdom) Viscount Downe with Pace Petroleum		7		Ret				4
63	(Italy) Carlo Facetti	(Italy) Jolly Club		9	11	Ret	Ret	11	12	4
63	(Italy) Martino Finotto	(Italy) Jolly Club		9	11	Ret	Ret	11	12	4
63	(West Germany) Wolfgang Braun	(Denmark) Jens Winther Team Castrol	11	10	Ret		12			4
63	(West Germany) Wolfgang Braun	(West Germany) Bernd Schiller							11	4
63	(United Kingdom) David Mercer	(Denmark) Jens Winther Team Castrol		10			12			4
63	(West Germany) Georg Memminger	(West Germany) Georg Memminger	12	14	10	13	Ret			4
63	(West Germany) Heinz Kunh-Weiss	(West Germany) Georg Memminger	12	14	10	13	Ret			4
63	(West Germany) Günter Steckkönig	(West Germany) Bernd Schiller	Ret	15		Ret				4
63	(West Germany) Günter Steckkönig	(West Germany) Georg Memminger			10					4
63	(South Africa) Desiré Wilson	(West Germany) Boss-Obermaier Racing				7				4
63	(South Africa) Desiré Wilson	(United Kingdom) John Fitzpatrick Racing							Ret	4
63	(Italy) Teo Fabi	(Italy) Martini Racing	Ret	Ret		Ret	7			4
63	(Japan) Kazuyoshi Hoshino	(Japan) Hoshino Racing						7		4
63	(Japan) Akira Hagiwara	(Japan) Hoshino Racing						7		4
63	(West Germany) Leopold von Bayern	(Denmark) Jens Winther Team Castrol				Ret				4
63	(West Germany) Leopold von Bayern	(West Germany) Joest Racing							7	4
63	(West Germany) Siegfried Brunn	(West Germany) Joest Racing							7	4
63	(South Africa) Klaus Grögor	(West Germany) Joest Racing							7	4
63	(United Kingdom) Paul Smith	(United Kingdom) Charles Ivey Racing		13		11	13		10	4
63	(United Kingdom) John Cooper	(United Kingdom) Charles Ivey Racing		13		11	13		10	4
63	(South Africa) Giorgio Cavalieri	(United Kingdom) Charles Ivey Racing							10	4
83	(Italy) Duilio Truffo	(Italy) Sivama/Grifone	8	Ret						3
83	(Italy) Roberto Sigala	(Italy) Sivama/Grifone	8							3
83	(Belgium) Jean-Michel Martin	(West Germany) Joest Racing		Ret		Ret	8			3
86	(Italy) Michele Alboreto	(Italy) Martini Racing	9	Ret	Ret	Ret	11			2
86	(United States) Tony Garcia	Sauber Racing Switzerland				9				2
86	(United States) Albert Naon	Sauber Racing Switzerland				9				2
86	(Colombia) Diego Montoya	Sauber Racing Switzerland				9				2
86	(Japan) Keiji Matsumoto	(Japan) Tom's						9		2
86	(Japan) Kaoru Hoshino	(Japan) Tom's						9		2
86	(Japan) Masanori Sekiya	(Japan) Tom's						9		2
93	(France) Jean-Louis Schlesser	(United States) Henn's T-Bird Swap Shop				10				1
93	(France) Claude Ballot-Léna	(United States) Henn's T-Bird Swap Shop				10				1
93	(France) Bruno Sotty	(West Germany) Kannacher GT-Racing				14	10			1
93	(France) Gérard Cuynet	(West Germany) Kannacher GT-Racing				14	10			1
93	(France) Valentin Bertapelle	(West Germany) Kannacher GT-Racing					10			1
93	(Italy) Fulvio Ballabio	Sauber Racing Switzerland						10		1
93	(Switzerland) Max Welti	Sauber Racing Switzerland						10		1
Pos.	Driver	Team	MON (Italy)	SIL (United Kingdom)	NUR (West Germany)	LMS (France)	SPA (Belgium)	FUJ (Japan)	KYA (South Africa)	Total points

Colour	Result
Gold	Winner
Silver	Second place
Bronze	Third place
Green	Points classification
Blue	Non-points classification
Blue	Non-classified finish (NC)
Purple	Retired, not classified (Ret)
Red	Did not qualify (DNQ)
Red	Did not pre-qualify (DNPQ)
Black	Disqualified (DSQ)
White	Did not start (DNS)
White	Withdrew (WD)
White	Race cancelled (C)
Blank	Did not practice (DNP)
Blank	Did not arrive (DNA)
Blank	Excluded (EX)

=== Makes' championships ===
To denote a make, it is identified as an engine manufacturer-chassis manufacturer. Only the best result from each make earned championship points while the five best results from each make's tally were counted. Points not counted are marked with parenthesis.

==== World Endurance Championship for Makes ====
The World Endurance Championship for Makes was open to Group C cars only. Group C Junior and Group B had their own championships.

Pos.	Make	MON (Italy)	SIL (United Kingdom)	NUR (West Germany)	LMS (France)	SPA (Belgium)	FUJ (Japan)	KYA (South Africa)	Total points
1	Porsche	1	1	1	1	1	(1)	(1)	100
2	Lancia	8	Ret	5	NC	6		2	32
3	Aston Martin-Nimrod		7		Ret	Ret			4
3	Nissan-March						7		4
5	BMW-Sauber				9		10		3
6	Toyota-Dome						9		2
7	BMW-URD					10			1

==== Group C Junior Cup ====
Pos.	Make	MON (Italy)	SIL (United Kingdom)	NUR (West Germany)	LMS (France)	SPA (Belgium)	FUJ (Japan)	KYA (South Africa)	Total points
1	Giannini-Alba		1	1	Ret	Ret	2	1	75
2	Mazda		Ret		1				20
2	Mazda-Harrier	Ret	DNS		DNQ	1			20
2	Toyota-March						1		20

==== Grand Touring Cup ====
Pos.	Make	MON (Italy)	SIL (United Kingdom)	NUR (West Germany)	LMS (France)	SPA (Belgium)	FUJ (Japan)	KYA (South Africa)	Total points
1	Porsche	3	(3)	1	1	2		2	82
2	BMW	1	1	Ret	Ret	1		1	80
