= 1983 1000 km of Nürburgring =

Sports car endurance race in Germany

The Nürburgring in 1983

The 1983 1000 km of Nürburgring was an endurance race held at the Nürburgring Nordschleife. It was Round 3 of the 1983 FIA World Endurance Championship. The race was the last international race to be held at the Nordschleife until the 2015 FIA WTCC Race of Germany, and the following year, the new GP-Strecke track was completed and all international racing was held on that section of the track. It was also the race where West German driver Stefan Bellof recorded a then-record 6:11.13 around the track in his factory backed Rothmans Porsche 956, which was unofficially beaten in 2018.

== Official results ==
Pos	Class	No	Team	Drivers	Chassis	Tyres	Laps
Pos	Class	No	Team	Drivers	Engine	Tyres	Laps
1	C	1	(West Germany) Rothmans Porsche	(West Germany) Jochen Mass (Belgium) Jacky Ickx	Porsche 956	D	44
1	C	1	(West Germany) Rothmans Porsche	(West Germany) Jochen Mass (Belgium) Jacky Ickx	Porsche Type-935 2.6L Turbo Flat-6	D	44
2	C	8	(West Germany) Sorga S.A. / Joest Racing	(France) Bob Wollek (Sweden) Stefan Johansson	Porsche 956	D	44
2	C	8	(West Germany) Sorga S.A. / Joest Racing	(France) Bob Wollek (Sweden) Stefan Johansson	Porsche Type-935 2.6L Turbo Flat-6	D	44
3	C	14	(United Kingdom) Canon Racing (United Kingdom) GTi Engineering	(Finland) Keke Rosberg (Netherlands) Jan Lammers (United Kingdom) Jonathan Palmer	Porsche 956	?	43
3	C	14	(United Kingdom) Canon Racing (United Kingdom) GTi Engineering	(Finland) Keke Rosberg (Netherlands) Jan Lammers (United Kingdom) Jonathan Palmer	Porsche Type-935 2.6L Turbo Flat-6	?	43
4	C	18	(West Germany) Obermaier Racing	(West Germany) Axel Plankenhorn (West Germany) Hans Heyer (West Germany) Jürgen Lässig	Porsche 956	D	42
4	C	18	(West Germany) Obermaier Racing	(West Germany) Axel Plankenhorn (West Germany) Hans Heyer (West Germany) Jürgen Lässig	Porsche Type-935 2.6L Turbo Flat-6	D	42
5	C	51	(Italy) Scuderia Sivava Motor	(Argentina) Oscar Larrauri (Italy) Massimo Sigala	Lancia LC1	D	40
5	C	51	(Italy) Scuderia Sivava Motor	(Argentina) Oscar Larrauri (Italy) Massimo Sigala	Lancia 1.8L Turbo I4	D	40
6	C	11	(United Kingdom) John Fitzpatrick Racing	(United Kingdom) John Fitzpatrick (United Kingdom) David Hobbs	Porsche 956	G	39
6	C	11	(United Kingdom) John Fitzpatrick Racing	(United Kingdom) John Fitzpatrick (United Kingdom) David Hobbs	Porsche Type-935 2.6L Turbo Flat-6	G	39
7	B	106	(West Germany) Edgar Dören	(West Germany) Edgar Dören (West Germany) Helmut Gall (West Germany) Jürgen Hamelmann	Porsche 930	?	37
7	B	106	(West Germany) Edgar Dören	(West Germany) Edgar Dören (West Germany) Helmut Gall (West Germany) Jürgen Hamelmann	Porsche 3.0L Turbo Flat-6	?	37
8	B	113	(West Germany) Autax Motor	(West Germany) Klaus Utz (Switzerland) Claude Haldi	Porsche 924 Carrera GTS	?	37
8	B	113	(West Germany) Autax Motor	(West Germany) Klaus Utz (Switzerland) Claude Haldi	Porsche 2.5L water-cooled I4	?	37
9	T	122	(West Germany) Herbst Tuning	(West Germany) Franz-Josef Bröhling (West Germany) Axel Felder (West Germany) Jochen Felder	Ford Escort RS 2000	?	36
9	T	122	(West Germany) Herbst Tuning	(West Germany) Franz-Josef Bröhling (West Germany) Axel Felder (West Germany) Jochen Felder	Ford 1.8L I4	?	36
10	B	110	(West Germany) Georg Memminger	(West Germany) Georg Memminger (West Germany) Heinz Kuhn-Weiss (West Germany) Günter Steckkönig	Porsche 930	D	36
10	B	110	(West Germany) Georg Memminger	(West Germany) Georg Memminger (West Germany) Heinz Kuhn-Weiss (West Germany) Günter Steckkönig	Porsche 3.3L Turbo Flat-6	D	36
11	C Jr	63	(Italy) Scuderia Jolly Club	(Italy) Carlo Facetti (Italy) Martino Finotto	Alba AR2 Giannini	P	36
11	C Jr	63	(Italy) Scuderia Jolly Club	(Italy) Carlo Facetti (Italy) Martino Finotto	Giannini Carma FF 1.9L Turbo I4	P	36
12	T	140	(West Germany) Hopf	(West Germany) Altfrid Heger (West Germany) Hartmut Bauer	Ford Escort RS	?	35
12	T	140	(West Germany) Hopf	(West Germany) Altfrid Heger (West Germany) Hartmut Bauer	Ford 1.6L I4	?	35
13	B	109	(West Germany) Wuppertal Motor Club	(West Germany) Wolf-Georg von Staerh (West Germany) Ulli Richter	Porsche 924 Carrera GTS	?	35
13	B	109	(West Germany) Wuppertal Motor Club	(West Germany) Wolf-Georg von Staerh (West Germany) Ulli Richter	Porsche 2.5L water-cooled I4	?	35
14	T	129	(West Germany) Andy Middendorf	(West Germany) Andy Middendorf (West Germany) Erhard Hassel (West Germany) Werner Lehnhoff	Ford Escort RS	?	35
14	T	129	(West Germany) Andy Middendorf	(West Germany) Andy Middendorf (West Germany) Erhard Hassel (West Germany) Werner Lehnhoff	Ford 1.6L I4	?	35
15	T	124	(West Germany) Langenfeld Motor Sport Club	(West Germany) Joachim Scheefeldt (West Germany) Olaf Manthey (West Germany) Uwe Reich	Ford Escort RS	?	35
15	T	124	(West Germany) Langenfeld Motor Sport Club	(West Germany) Joachim Scheefeldt (West Germany) Olaf Manthey (West Germany) Uwe Reich	Porsche 3.3L Turbo Flat-6	?	35
16	B	111	(West Germany) Probst & Mentel	(West Germany) Helge Probst (West Germany) Norbert Haug (West Germany) Wolfgang Walter	Porsche 928 S	?	31
16	B	111	(West Germany) Probst & Mentel	(West Germany) Helge Probst (West Germany) Norbert Haug (West Germany) Wolfgang Walter	Porsche 4.7L V8	?	31
17	B	108	(West Germany) Peter Reuter	(West Germany) Peter Reuter (West Germany) Franz-Richard Friebel (West Germany) Hermann-Peter Duge	Porsche 930	?	28
17	B	108	(West Germany) Peter Reuter	(West Germany) Peter Reuter (West Germany) Franz-Richard Friebel (West Germany) Hermann-Peter Duge	Porsche 3.3L Turbo Flat-6	?	28
18 DSQ	B	112	(West Germany) Mich Tuning	(West Germany) Karl-Heinz Schäfer (West Germany) Karl-Heinz Gürthler	Opel Ascona 400	D	36
18 DSQ	B	112	(West Germany) Mich Tuning	(West Germany) Karl-Heinz Schäfer (West Germany) Karl-Heinz Gürthler	Opel 2.4L S4	D	36
19 DNF	C	4	(Italy) Martini Lancia	(Italy) Riccardo Patrese (Italy) Michele Alboreto	Lancia LC2	D	35
19 DNF	C	4	(Italy) Martini Lancia	(Italy) Riccardo Patrese (Italy) Michele Alboreto	Ferrari 268C 2.6L Turbo V8	D	35
20 DNF	C	6	(Italy) Scuderia Mirabella	(Italy) Giorgio Francia (Italy) Piercarlo Ghinzani (Italy) Paolo Barilla	Lancia LC2	MI	29
20 DNF	C	6	(Italy) Scuderia Mirabella	(Italy) Giorgio Francia (Italy) Piercarlo Ghinzani (Italy) Paolo Barilla	Ferrari 268C 2.6L Turbo V8	MI	29
21 DNF	T	125	(West Germany) Langenfield Motorsport Club	(West Germany) Wilfred Eichen (West Germany) Walter Mertes (West Germany) Olaf Manthey	Ford Escort II	D	27
21 DNF	T	125	(West Germany) Langenfield Motorsport Club	(West Germany) Wilfred Eichen (West Germany) Walter Mertes (West Germany) Olaf Manthey	Ford 1.4L I4	D	27
22 DNF	C	2	(West Germany) Rothmans Porsche	(United Kingdom) Derek Bell (West Germany) Stefan Bellof	Porsche 956	D	19
22 DNF	C	2	(West Germany) Rothmans Porsche	(United Kingdom) Derek Bell (West Germany) Stefan Bellof	Porsche Type 935 3.0L Turbo Flat-6	D	19
23 DNF	C	35	(Switzerland) Brun Motorsport	(West Germany) Hans-Joachim Stuck (Switzerland) Walter Brun	Sehcar SH C6	D	19
23 DNF	C	35	(Switzerland) Brun Motorsport	(West Germany) Hans-Joachim Stuck (Switzerland) Walter Brun	BMW M88 3.5L Turbo I6	D	19
24 DNF	C	56	(West Germany) Jürgen Kannacher	(West Germany) Rolf Götz (West Germany) Peter Kröber	URD C81	?	19
24 DNF	C	56	(West Germany) Jürgen Kannacher	(West Germany) Rolf Götz (West Germany) Peter Kröber	BMW M88 3.5L Turbo I6	?	19
25 DNF	T	127	(West Germany) HWRT Auto Tuning	(West Germany) Günther Braumüller (West Germany) Dieter Selzer (West Germany) Andreas Schall	Ford Escort RS	D	16
25 DNF	T	127	(West Germany) HWRT Auto Tuning	(West Germany) Günther Braumüller (West Germany) Dieter Selzer (West Germany) Andreas Schall	Ford 1.6L I4	D	16
26 DNF	B	101	(Switzerland) Brun Motorsport	(West Germany) Harald Grohs (West Germany) Leopold Von Bayern	BMW M1	MI	14
26 DNF	B	101	(Switzerland) Brun Motorsport	(West Germany) Harald Grohs (West Germany) Leopold Von Bayern	BMW M88 3.5L I6	MI	14
27 DNF	B	103	(Denmark) Jens Winther	(West Germany) Frank Jelinski (Denmark) Jens Winther (West Germany) Wolfgang Braun	BMW M1	D	12
27 DNF	B	103	(Denmark) Jens Winther	(West Germany) Frank Jelinski (Denmark) Jens Winther (West Germany) Wolfgang Braun	BMW M88 3.5L I6	D	12
28 DNF	T	131	(West Germany) Krautol Faruben	(West Germany) Martin Wagenstetter (West Germany) Kurt Hild	BMW 320i	D	11
28 DNF	T	131	(West Germany) Krautol Faruben	(West Germany) Martin Wagenstetter (West Germany) Kurt Hild	BMW M10 2.4L S4	D	11
29 DNF	T	132	(West Germany) Essen-Werdener Automobil Club	(West Germany) Frederich Burgmann (West Germany) Harald ten Eicken	BMW 320i	MI	11
29 DNF	T	132	(West Germany) Essen-Werdener Automobil Club	(West Germany) Frederich Burgmann (West Germany) Harald ten Eicken	BMW M10 2.4L S4	MI	11
30 DNF	T	139	(West Germany) Mich Tuning	(West Germany) Volker Strycek (West Germany) Fred Michael Gubbin	BMW 320i	G	8
30 DNF	T	139	(West Germany) Mich Tuning	(West Germany) Volker Strycek (West Germany) Fred Michael Gubbin	BMW M10 2.4L S4	G	8
31 DNF	T	128	(West Germany) HWRT Auto Tuning	(West Germany) Wilhelm Kern (West Germany) Norbert Brenner (West Germany) Jörg van Ommen	Ford Escort	D	6
31 DNF	T	128	(West Germany) HWRT Auto Tuning	(West Germany) Wilhelm Kern (West Germany) Norbert Brenner (West Germany) Jörg van Ommen	Ford 1.2L I4	D	6
32 DNF	T	123	(West Germany) Herbst Tuning	(West Germany) Udo Schneider (West Germany) Franz-Josef Bröhling	Ford Escort	A	5
32 DNF	T	123	(West Germany) Herbst Tuning	(West Germany) Udo Schneider (West Germany) Franz-Josef Bröhling	Ford 1.2L I4	A	5
33 DNF	T	136	(West Germany) Peter Langenbach	(West Germany) Herbert Schmitz (West Germany) Peter Langenbach (West Germany) Bernd Denter	Audi 80 Coupe	?	4
33 DNF	T	136	(West Germany) Peter Langenbach	(West Germany) Herbert Schmitz (West Germany) Peter Langenbach (West Germany) Bernd Denter	Audi 1.8L I4	?	4
34 DNF	T	134	(West Germany) Mich Tuning	(West Germany) Wolfgang Holzem (West Germany) Rainer Müller	Opel Ascona B	D	3
34 DNF	T	134	(West Germany) Mich Tuning	(West Germany) Wolfgang Holzem (West Germany) Rainer Müller	Opel 2L S4	D	3
35 DNF	T	121	(West Germany) Herbst Tuning	(West Germany) Axel Felder (West Germany) Udo Schneider (West Germany) Jochen Felder	Ford Escort	A	2
35 DNF	T	121	(West Germany) Herbst Tuning	(West Germany) Axel Felder (West Germany) Udo Schneider (West Germany) Jochen Felder	Ford 1.2L I4	A	2
36 DNS	B	105	(West Germany) Racing Team Jürgensen GmbH	(West Germany) Hans Christian Jürgensen (West Germany) Edgar Dören (United Kingdom) Vic Elford	BMW M1	MI	
36 DNS	B	105	(West Germany) Racing Team Jürgensen GmbH	(West Germany) Hans Christian Jürgensen (West Germany) Edgar Dören (United Kingdom) Vic Elford	BMW M88 3.5 L I6	MI	
37 DNS	T	130	(West Germany) Langenfeld Motor Sport Club	(West Germany) Bernd Bonn (West Germany) Uwe Reich (West Germany) Erwin Derichs	Renault R5 Turbo	MI	
37 DNS	T	130	(West Germany) Langenfeld Motor Sport Club	(West Germany) Bernd Bonn (West Germany) Uwe Reich (West Germany) Erwin Derichs	Renault1.4 L C-Type I4 Turbo	MI	
38 DNS	T	135	(West Germany) Volker Imhof	(West Germany) Volker Imhof (West Germany) Wilfried Gollombeck (West Germany) Günter Filthaut	Opel Kadett	G	
38 DNS	T	135	(West Germany) Volker Imhof	(West Germany) Volker Imhof (West Germany) Wilfried Gollombeck (West Germany) Günter Filthaut	Opel 1.8L I4	G	

== Notes ==
- Pole position: #2 Rothmans Porsche (Stefan Bellof) - 6:11:13
- Fastest lap: #2 Rothmans Porsche (Stefan Bellof) - 6:25:91

World Sportscar Championship
Previous race: 1983 1000km of Silverstone	1983 season	Next race: 1983 24 Hours of Le Mans
