= 1983 1000km of Silverstone =

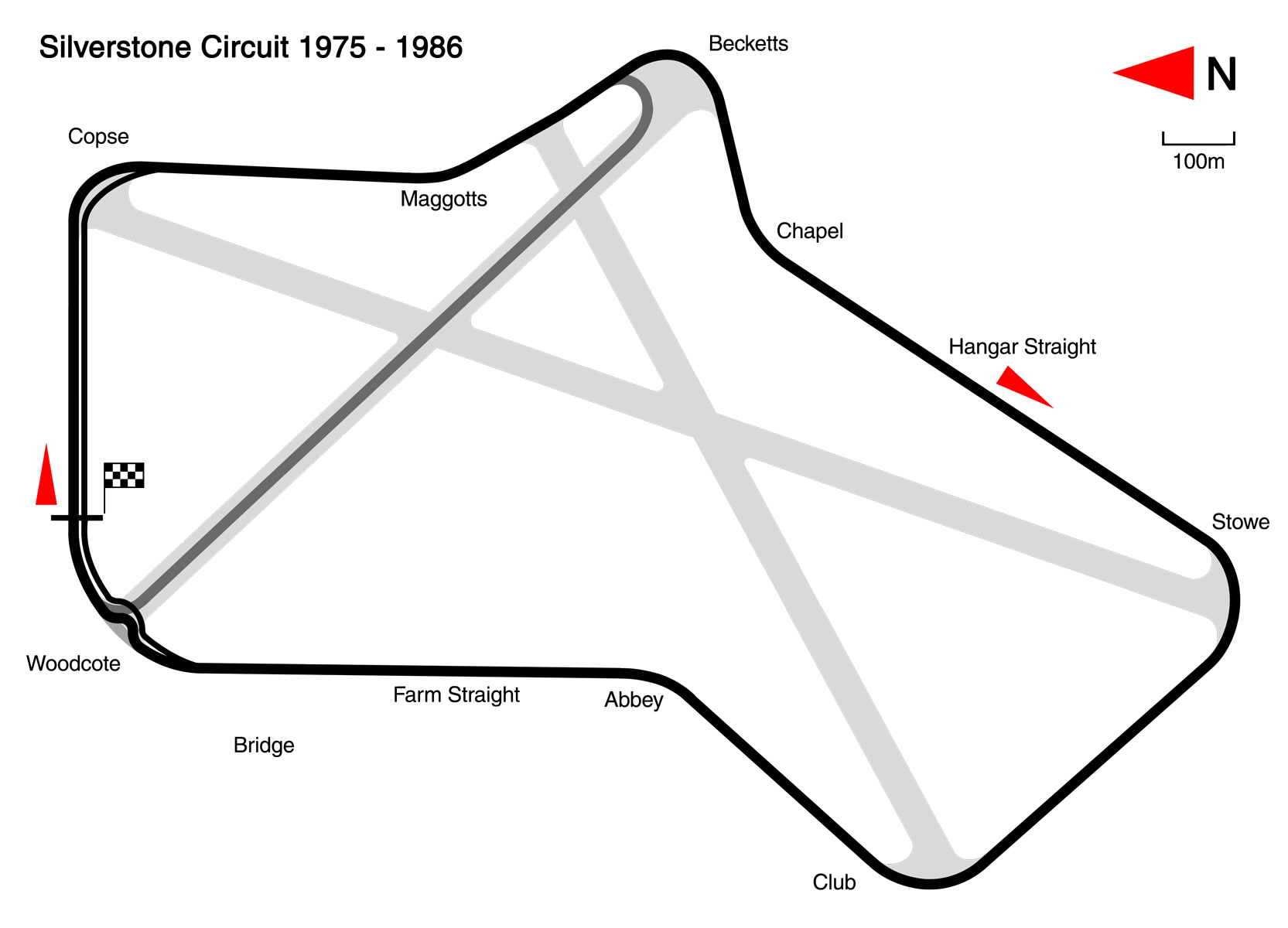
Map of the Silverstone Circuit (1975–1986)

The 1983 Grand Prix International 1000 km was the second round of the 1983 World Sportscar Championship and 1983 European Endurance Championship. It took place at the Silverstone Circuit, Great Britain on 8 May 1983. The event was won by the No. 2 Rothmans Porsche Porsche 956 driven by Derek Bell and Stefan Bellof.

== Race results ==
Class winners in bold.

Pos	Class	No	Team	Drivers	Car	Laps
1	**C**	**2**	**(Germany) Rothmans Porsche**	**(United Kingdom) Derek Bell (Germany) Stefan Bellof**	**Porsche 956**	**212**
2	C	8	(Germany) Sorga SA	(France) Bob Wollek (Sweden) Stefan Johansson	Porsche 956	212
3	C	14	(United Kingdom) Canon Racing	(Netherlands) Jan Lammers (Belgium) Thierry Boutsen	Porsche 956	205
4	C	18	(Germany) Boss-Obermaier Racing	(Germany) Axel Plankenhorn (Germany) Jürgen Lässig (Germany) Harald Grohs	Porsche 956	201
5	C	21	(Germany) Porsche Kremer Racing	(Australia) Alan Jones (Australia) Vern Schuppan	Porsche 956	201
6	C	42	(United Kingdom) Richard Cleare	(United Kingdom) Tony Dron (United Kingdom) Richard Cleare	Porsche CK5	197
7	C	39	(United Kingdom) Viscount Downe with Race Petroleum	(United Kingdom) Ray Mallock (United Kingdom) Mike Salmon	Nimrod NRA/C2	184
8	C	11	(United Kingdom) John Fitzpatrick Racing	(United Kingdom) John Fitzpatrick (United Kingdom) David Hobbs	Porsche 956	180
9	**C Junior**	**63**	**(Italy) Jolly Club**	**(Italy) Carlo Facetti (Italy) Martino Finotto**	**Alba AR2**	**172**
10	**B**	**89**	**(Denmark) Team Castrol**	**(Denmark) Jens Winther (United Kingdom) David Mercer (Germany) Wolfgang Braun**	**BMW M1**	**169**
11	B	88	(Germany) Racing Team Jürgensen GmbH	(Germany) Edgar Dören (Germany) Hans Christian Jürgensen (Italy) Antoniella Mandelli	BMW M1	169
12	C	55	(United Kingdom) François Duret	(United Kingdom) Mike Wilds (United Kingdom) François Duret (United Kingdom) Ian Harrower	De Cadenet Lola	167
13 DNF	C	41	(United Kingdom) Emka Productions Ltd.	(United Kingdom) Tiff Needell (United Kingdom) Jeff Allam (United Kingdom) Steve O'Rourke	EMKA C83/1	165
14	B	93	(United Kingdom) Charles Ivey Racing	(United Kingdom) John Cooper (United Kingdom) Paul Smith (United Kingdom) David Ovey	Porsche 930	159
15	B	92	(Germany) Georg Memminger	(Germany) Georg Memminger (Germany) Heinz Kuhn-Weiss	Porsche 930	149
16	B	92	(Germany) Bernd Schiller	(Germany) Günter Steckkönig (Germany) Bernd Schiller	Porsche 930	148
17 DNF	C	1	(Germany) Rothmans Porsche	(Belgium) Jacky Ickx (Germany) Jochen Mass	Porsche 956	114
18 DNF	C	52	(Italy) Grifone/Sivama	(Italy) Joe Castellano (Italy) Duilio Truffo	Lancia LC1	98
19 DNF	C	51	(Italy) Grifone/Sivama	(Italy) Massimo Sigala (Argentina) Oscar Larrauri	Lancia LC1	94
20 DNF	C	15	(Germany) Joest Racing	(Belgium) Marc Duez (Belgium) Philippe Martin (Belgium) Jean-Michel Martin	Porsche 936	77
21 DNF	C	4	(Italy) Martini Racing	(Italy) Michele Alboreto (Italy) Riccardo Patrese	Lancia LC2-83	74
22 DNF	C	12	(Germany) Joest Racing	(Germany) Volkert Merl (Germany) Clemens Schickentanz (Germany) Hans Heyer	Porsche 956	74
23 DNF	C	5	(Italy) Martini Racing	(Italy) Piercarlo Ghinzani (Italy) Teo Fabi	Lancia LC2	54
24 DNF	C	47	(United States) Henns' T-Bird Swap Shop	(United States) Preston Henn (United Kingdom) Guy Edwards (United Kingdom) Rupert Keegan	Porsche 956	54
25 DNF	C	35	(Switzerland) Brun Motorsport GmbH	(Germany) Hans-Joachim Stuck (Switzerland) Walter Brun	Sehcar SH C6	32
26 DNF	C Junior	60	(Japan) Mazdaspeed	(Japan) Yojiro Terada (United Kingdom) Pete Lovett	Mazda 717C	32
27 DNF	B	95	(France) Equipe Alméras Frères	(France) Jean-Marie Alméras (France) Roland Biancone (France) Jacques Guillot	Porsche 930	7
DNS	B	91	(Germany) Edgar Dören	(Germany) Helmut Gall (United States) Margie Smith-Haas	Porsche 930	0
DNS	C Junior	62	(United Kingdom) Manns Racing	(United Kingdom) David Palmer (United Kingdom) Roy Baker	Harrier RX83C	0
