= 6 Hours of Silverstone =

Sports car endurance race in the United Kingdom

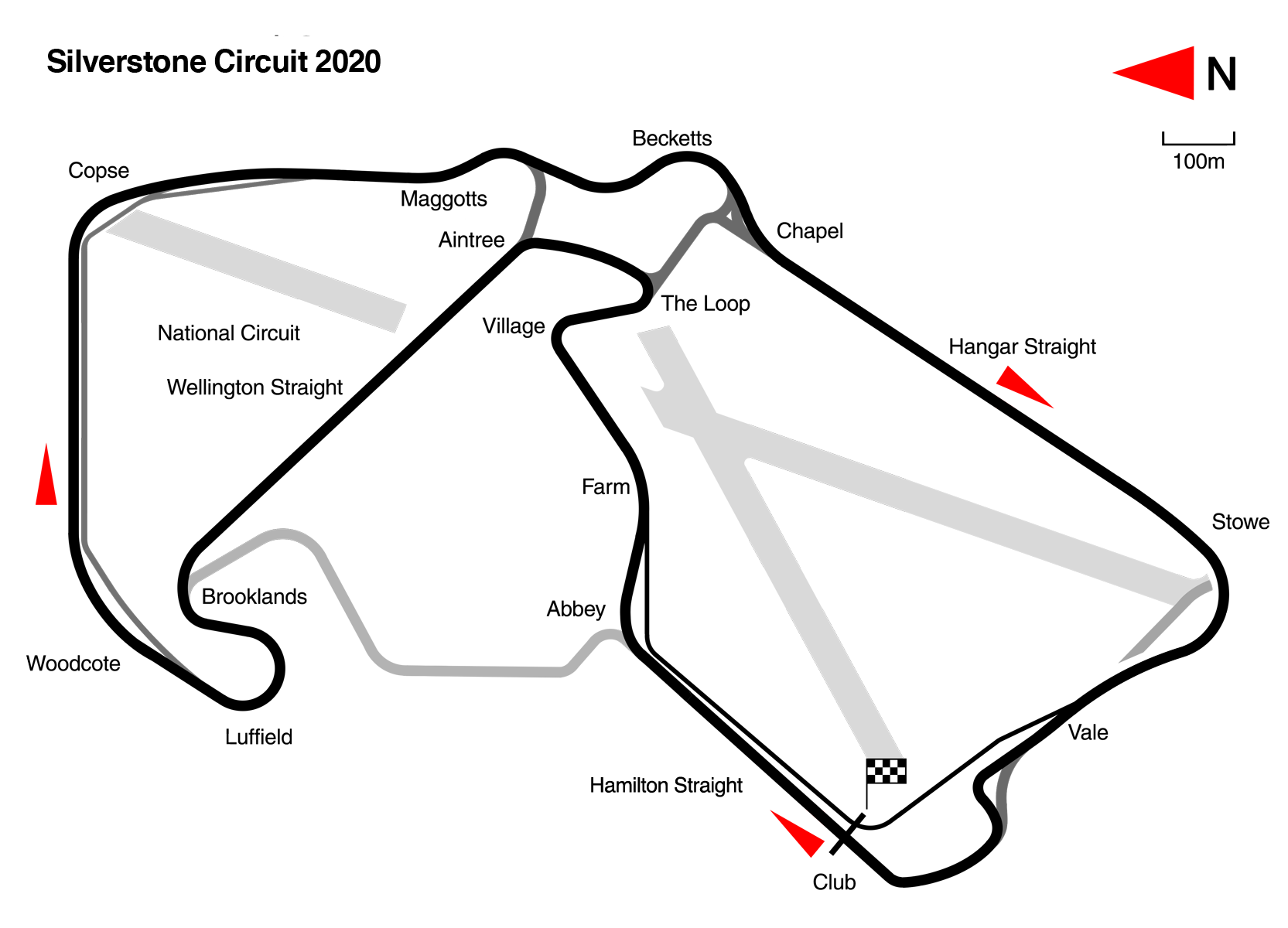

FIA World Endurance Championship
- Venue: Silverstone Circuit
- Corporate sponsor: Autosport
- First race: 1976
- First FIA WEC race: 2012
- Duration: 6 Hours
- Previous names: 1000 Kilometres of Silverstone; 4 Hours of Silverstone
- Most wins (driver): (Belgium) Jacky Ickx (4); (Germany) Jochen Mass (4); (United Kingdom) Allan McNish (4)
- Most wins (team): (United Kingdom) Silk Cut Jaguar (5)
- Most wins (manufacturer): Porsche (7)

The 6 Hours of Silverstone (formerly the 1000 km of Silverstone and 4 Hours of Silverstone) is an endurance sports car race held at Silverstone Circuit near the Northamptonshire villages of Silverstone and Whittlebury. First run in 1976 as part of the World Sportscar Championship, the race was a part of the FIA World Endurance Championship between 2012 and 2019, but the 2020 race was cancelled due to the COVID-19 pandemic and did not return for 2021. The RAC Tourist Trophy has been awarded to the winners of the event.

== History ==
In 1975, a round of the World Championship of Makes was not held in Britain for one of the first times since 1966. The 1000 km Brands Hatch which had been run almost consecutively during that period went under hiatus while track upgrades were carried out. Following upgrades of its own in 1975, plans were made for sportscars to return to Britain by using Silverstone instead of Brands Hatch. The event was a six-hour endurance, part of the Group 5 World Championship.

The first running consisted of a small field as some season competitors chose not to compete. British drivers John Fitzpatrick and Tom Walkinshaw managed to upset the factory teams by scoring the inaugural victory in a BMW. The following year, competition grew as the factory Porsche team, under the guise of Martini Racing, earned their first of two consecutive victories for drivers Jochen Mass and Jacky Ickx. The Porsche factory team was not able to continue their streak into 1979 when their lead car crashed, leaving the privateer Gelo Racing Porsche to a dominant win.

1980 saw the first victory by a sports-prototype. Alain de Cadenet managed to win the home event as a driver, team owner, as well as a constructor when he and Desiré Wilson won by 18 seconds in a car of his own design. A Group 5 car took its final victory in 1981 with the all-German Velga Racing Team before the class was phased out.

1982 was the first year of the Group C category in the World Championship, although the race that year was actually won by an older Group 6 Lancia. The first Group C victory came in 1983 as Porsche returned to their factory dominance of the event, going on to win the 1984 and 1985 events as well. Jacky Ickx and Jochen Mass still hold record of most wins, having won the race four times in 1977, 1978, 1984 and 1985. In 1986 British success returned as the Jaguar factory team was able to upset Porsche for the first time since the company had returned to racing. Jaguar then began to dominate in a fashion similar to Porsche, as they too won the next two years. American Eddie Cheever co-drove in each of the three victories.

No race was held in 1989 as Donington temporarily replaced Silverstone on the schedule, but sportscars returned in 1990 for a shorter 480 km event. Jaguar returned to their winning ways straight away before going on to earn a fifth straight victory in a 430 km event in 1991. Only after Jaguar officially retired from the World Championship was another manufacturer able to once again earn victory at Silverstone, this time being Peugeot. A lack of entrants however lead to the cancellation of the World Championship, temporarily ending endurance racing at the circuit. The race did make a one-year comeback in 2000 as part of the American Le Mans Series. The race served as a precursor to the European Le Mans Series that followed in 2001.

In 2004, the new Le Mans Endurance Series was created to resurrect several 1000 km endurance races in a modern era. Among these was Silverstone, running at its original distance. Once again, British success started off the return of the event as Allan McNish and the British Audi team won the event. Audi and McNish won again the following year, this time under the control of the French Oreca team, although the race was heavily hampered by rain. Silverstone took a brief hiatus in 2006 as Donington replaced the event once again, only to return once again in 2007. Peugeot earned their second victory, this time with a diesel-powered Le Mans prototype. The 2010 edition was the inaugural race of the Intercontinental Le Mans Cup, as well as the first time the race used the new 5.901 km (3.667 mi) "Arena" configuration. The race continued in 2012 as a part of the FIA World Endurance Championship.

On 12 June 2026, it was announced that FIA World Endurance Championship will return to Silverstone with a 6-hour race after 8 years.

== Winners ==
Year	Drivers	Team	Car
6 Hour distance
1976	(United Kingdom) John Fitzpatrick (United Kingdom) Tom Walkinshaw	(United Kingdom) Hermetite BMW	BMW 3.5 CSL
1977	(West Germany) Jochen Mass (Belgium) Jacky Ickx	(West Germany) Martini Racing	Porsche 935/77
1978	(West Germany) Jochen Mass (Belgium) Jacky Ickx	(West Germany) Martini Racing	Porsche 935/78
1979	(West Germany) Hans Heyer (France) Bob Wollek (United Kingdom) John Fitzpatrick	(West Germany) Gelo Sportswear Team	Porsche 935/77A
1980	(United Kingdom) Alain de Cadenet (South Africa) Desiré Wilson	(United Kingdom) Alain de Cadenet	De Cadenet Lola-Ford
1981	(West Germany) Harald Grohs (West Germany) Walter Röhrl (West Germany) Dieter Schornstein	(West Germany) Vegla Racing Team	Porsche 935J
1982	(Italy) Riccardo Patrese (Italy) Michele Alboreto	(Italy) Martini Racing	Lancia LC1
1000 km distance
1983	(United Kingdom) Derek Bell (West Germany) Stefan Bellof	(West Germany) Rothmans Porsche	Porsche 956
1984	(West Germany) Jochen Mass (Belgium) Jacky Ickx	(West Germany) Rothmans Porsche	Porsche 956
1985	(West Germany) Jochen Mass (Belgium) Jacky Ickx	(West Germany) Rothmans Porsche	Porsche 962C
1986	(United Kingdom) Derek Warwick (United States) Eddie Cheever	(United Kingdom) Silk Cut Jaguar	Jaguar XJR-6
1987	(United States) Eddie Cheever (Brazil) Raul Boesel	(United Kingdom) Silk Cut Jaguar	Jaguar XJR-8
1988	(United States) Eddie Cheever (United Kingdom) Martin Brundle	(United Kingdom) Silk Cut Jaguar	Jaguar XJR-9
1989	No race		
480 km distance
1990	(United Kingdom) Martin Brundle (France) Alain Ferté	(United Kingdom) Silk Cut Jaguar	Jaguar XJR-11
430 km distance
1991	(Italy) Teo Fabi (United Kingdom) Derek Warwick	(United Kingdom) Silk Cut Jaguar	Jaguar XJR-14
500 km distance
1992	(United Kingdom) Derek Warwick (France) Yannick Dalmas	(France) Peugeot Talbot Sport	Peugeot 905 Evo 1B
1993 to 1999	No races		
2000	(Finland) JJ Lehto (Germany) Jörg Müller	(Germany) BMW Motorsport	BMW V12 LMR
2001 to 2003	No races		
1000 km distance
2004	(Switzerland) Pierre Kaffer (United Kingdom) Allan McNish	(United Kingdom) Audi Sport UK Team Veloqx	Audi R8
2005†	(United Kingdom) Allan McNish (Monaco) Stéphane Ortelli	(France) Audi PlayStation Team Oreca	Audi R8
2006	No race		
2007	(Spain) Marc Gené (France) Nicolas Minassian	(France) Team Peugeot Total	Peugeot 908 HDi FAP
2008	(United Kingdom) Allan McNish (Italy) Rinaldo Capello	(Germany) Audi Sport Team Joest	Audi R10 TDI
2009	(France) Olivier Panis (France) Nicolas Lapierre	(France) Team Oreca Matmut AIM	Oreca 01-AIM
2010	(France) Nicolas Minassian (United Kingdom) Anthony Davidson	(France) Team Peugeot Total	Peugeot 908 HDi FAP
6 Hour distance
2011	(France) Sébastien Bourdais (France) Simon Pagenaud	(France) Peugeot Sport Total	Peugeot 908
2012	(France) Benoît Tréluyer (Germany) André Lotterer (Switzerland) Marcel Fässler	(Germany) Audi Sport Team Joest	Audi R18 e-tron quattro
2013	(Denmark) Tom Kristensen (United Kingdom) Allan McNish (France) Loïc Duval	(Germany) Audi Sport Team Joest	Audi R18 e-tron quattro
2014	(United Kingdom) Anthony Davidson (France) Nicolas Lapierre (Switzerland) Sébastien Buemi	(Japan) Toyota Racing	Toyota TS040 Hybrid
2015	(Germany) André Lotterer (France) Benoît Tréluyer (Switzerland) Marcel Fässler	(Germany) Audi Sport Team Joest	Audi R18 e-tron quattro
2016	(Germany) Marc Lieb (Switzerland) Neel Jani (France) Romain Dumas	(Germany) Porsche Team	Porsche 919 Hybrid
2017	(United Kingdom) Anthony Davidson (Japan) Kazuki Nakajima (Switzerland) Sébastien Buemi	(Japan) Toyota Gazoo Racing	Toyota TS050 Hybrid
2018	(Switzerland) Mathias Beche (France) Thomas Laurent (United States) Gustavo Menezes	(Switzerland) Rebellion Racing	Rebellion R13-Gibson
4 Hour distance
2019	(Argentina) José María López (Japan) Kamui Kobayashi (United Kingdom) Mike Conway	(Japan) Toyota Gazoo Racing	Toyota TS050 Hybrid
2020 to 2026	No race		
6 Hour distance

† - Race went under a 6-hour time limit. Only 776 km of the 1000 km scheduled were covered.
