= Ferrari 268/282C/308C engine =

Overview
- Manufacturer: Ferrari
- Production: 1983–1986

Layout
- Configuration: 90° V8
- Displacement: 2.6–3.0 L (159–183 cu in)
- Cylinder bore: 80 mm (3 in)
- Piston stroke: 64.5 mm (3 in)
- Valvetrain: 32-valve, DOHC, four-valves per cylinder
- Compression ratio: 7.0:1–8.0:1

Combustion
- Turbocharger: KKK twin-turbocharged
- Fuel system: Mechanical multi-point fuel injection
- Fuel type: Gasoline
- Oil system: Dry sump

Output
- Power output: 620–850 hp (462–634 kW)
- Torque output: 376–800 lb⋅ft (510–1,085 N⋅m)

The Ferrari 268/282C/308C engine is a twin-turbocharged, 2.6-litre, 2.8-litre, or 3.0-litre, V-8 racing engine, designed, developed and built by Ferrari for their sister company Lancia. It was used in the Lancia LC2 Group C sports prototype race car from 1983 to 1986. The engine itself is derived from Ferrari's Dino V8.

== Design ==
Besides the fact that the LC1 had an open-cockpit, the turbocharged straight-four Lancia engine it had used was not capable of achieving the fuel economy necessary in the new Group C regulations, requiring Lancia to also seek a new powerplant. Under the direction of Cesare Fiorio, Lancia began to work on the LC1's replacement. Lancia lacked a production engine large enough to base a racing engine on, leaving the company to turn to outside sources. Since Lancia were owned by the Fiat Group, they were able to seek the assistance of fellow Fiat company Ferrari. Ferrari allowed Lancia to adapt the new naturally aspirated 3.0 litres (183 cu in) four valve V8 which had been introduced in the Ferrari 308 GTBi QV in 1982. The development of the engine was assigned by Enzo Ferrari to Nicola Materazzi, then Chief Engineer in the Racing Department. The development was done in parallel with that of the F114B powering the 288 GTO and both engines were intended with high duty in mind, with one difference being that the 288 GTO engine would use IHI turbos for the road. The basic engine architecture was heavily redesigned for racing purposes and the engine was reduced in capacity to 2.6 litres (159 cu in) and two KKK turbochargers were added to help the engine provide the fuel economy and power necessary. The specific engine displacement was chosen because of the possibility of using the same engine in the North American CART series. The engine was initially connected to a Hewland five-speed manual gearbox, which was replaced by an Abarth-cased unit in 1984.

The Ferrari V8 was modified in 1984, bringing the displacement back up to 3.0-litres in an attempt to increase reliability and horsepower while improved engine electronics from Magneti Marelli allowed the larger engine to use the same amount of fuel as the previous version. The engine developed just under 840 hp (626 kW) at 9000 rpm with a massive 800 lb⋅ft (1,085 N⋅m) at 4800 rpm, the twin KKK turbos were running at 3.0 bar boost and would start pulling from 3000 rpm. In total, seven LC2s were built under the direction of Lancia, while a further two were built for Gianni Mussato without official backing after the program had ended.

After the program had ended, Abarth acquired an LC2 and fitted it with the 3.5-litre Alfa Romeo Tipo 1035 V10 engine from the Alfa Romeo 164 Procar, and developed it under the project name SE047. The SE047 was an early development of the Alfa Romeo SE 048SP project in 1988. The SE047's engine was ultimately not utilized in the later stages of the SE 048SP development.

== Applications ==
- Lancia LC2
