= Lancia LC2 =

Series of racing cars by Italian automobile manufacturer Lancia

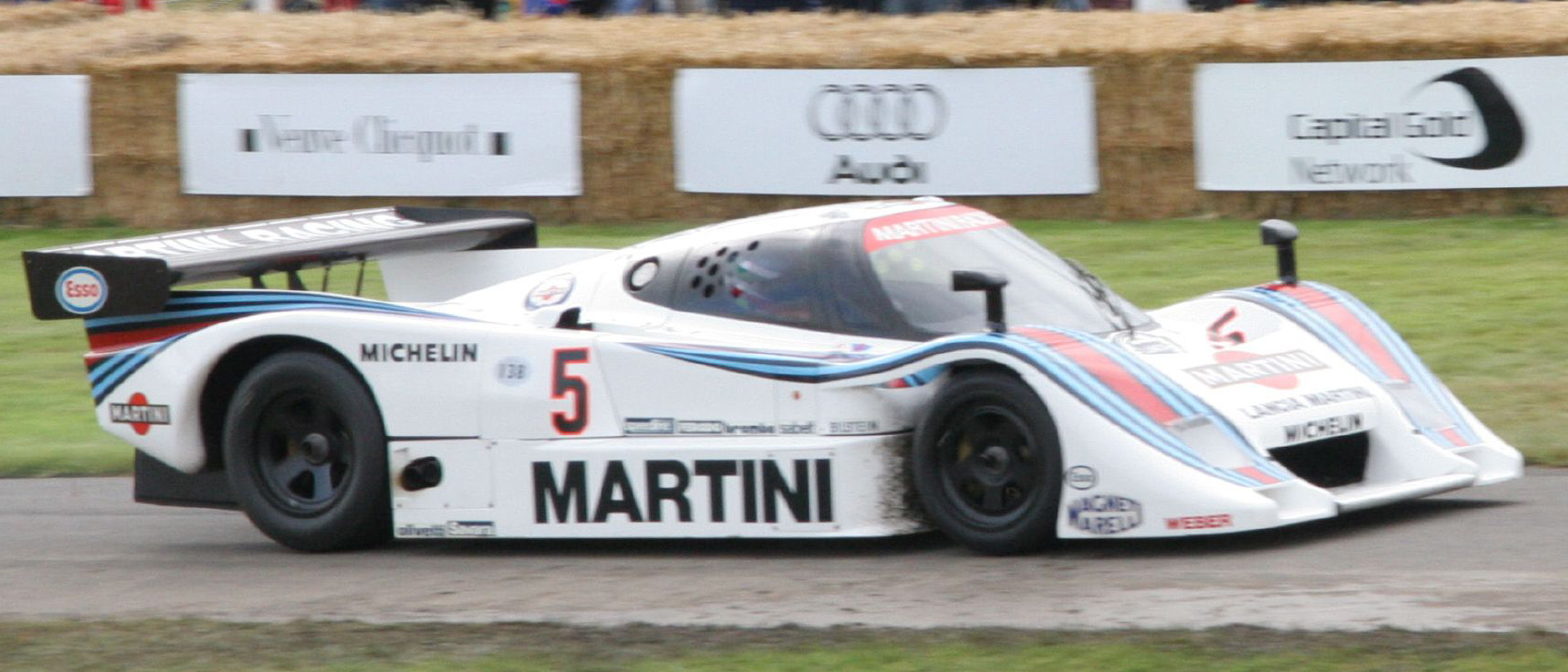
- Category: Group C
- Constructor: Lancia (with Abarth and Dallara)
- Designers: Giampaolo Dallara (chassis); Nicola Materazzi (engine)

Technical specifications
- Chassis: Aluminium monocoque
- Suspension (front): Double wishbone suspension, coil-spring over damper
- Suspension (rear): Double wishbone suspension, coil-spring over damper
- Engine: Ferrari 308C 2599 cc/3014 cc V8. Twin-turbocharged mid-mounted
- Transmission: Hewland (Abarth-cased from 1984) 5-speed manual transmission
- Tyres: Pirelli, Dunlop, Michelin

Competition history
- Notable entrants: (Italy) Martini Racing (Italy) Mussato Action Car (Italy) Dollop Racing
- Notable drivers: (Italy) Michele Alboreto (Italy) Riccardo Patrese (Italy) Teo Fabi (Italy) Alessandro Nannini (Italy) Paolo Barilla (Italy) Mauro Baldi (Italy) Pierluigi Martini (Italy) Andrea de Cesaris (Italy) Bruno Giacomelli (Germany) Hans Heyer (France) Bob Wollek
- Debut: 1983 1000 km of Monza
- Last season: 1991
| Races | Wins | Poles | F/Laps |
|---|---|---|---|
| 51 | 3 | 13 | 11 |
- Constructors' Championships: 0
- Drivers' Championships: 0

The Lancia LC2 (sometimes referred to as the Lancia-Ferrari) was a series of racing cars built by Italian automobile manufacturer Lancia and powered by engines built by their sister company Ferrari. They were part of Lancia's official factory-backed effort in the World Sportscar Championship from 1983 to 1986, although they continued to be used by privateer teams until 1991. They were also the company's first car meeting the FIA's new Group C regulations for sports prototypes.

More powerful than their primary competition, the Porsche 956s, the LC2s were able to secure multiple pole positions during their three and a half seasons with the factory Martini Racing squad. However, deficiencies in reliability and fuel consumption hampered the LC2s' efforts for race wins against the Porsches. LC2s earned three race victories over their lifetimes in the hands of Italian drivers Teo Fabi, Riccardo Patrese, Alessandro Nannini, and Mauro Baldi, as well as German Hans Heyer and Frenchman Bob Wollek.

== Development ==
In 1982, the new Group C regulations were introduced to the World Championship. This rule set required teams to use coupé-style cars that had to be able to meet a fuel economy standard mandated at 100 kilometres (62.1 mi) for every 60 litres (16 US gal) of fuel. The Lancia LC1, which had been built to the older Group 6 regulations, initially competed in 1982, but had to be replaced in order for Lancia to earn constructors' points in the World Championship, now open to Group C cars only in 1983. Besides the fact that the LC1 had an open-cockpit, the turbocharged straight-four Lancia engine it had used was not capable of achieving the fuel economy necessary in the new Group C regulations, requiring Lancia to also seek a new powerplant. Under the direction of Cesare Fiorio, Lancia began to work on the LC1's replacement.

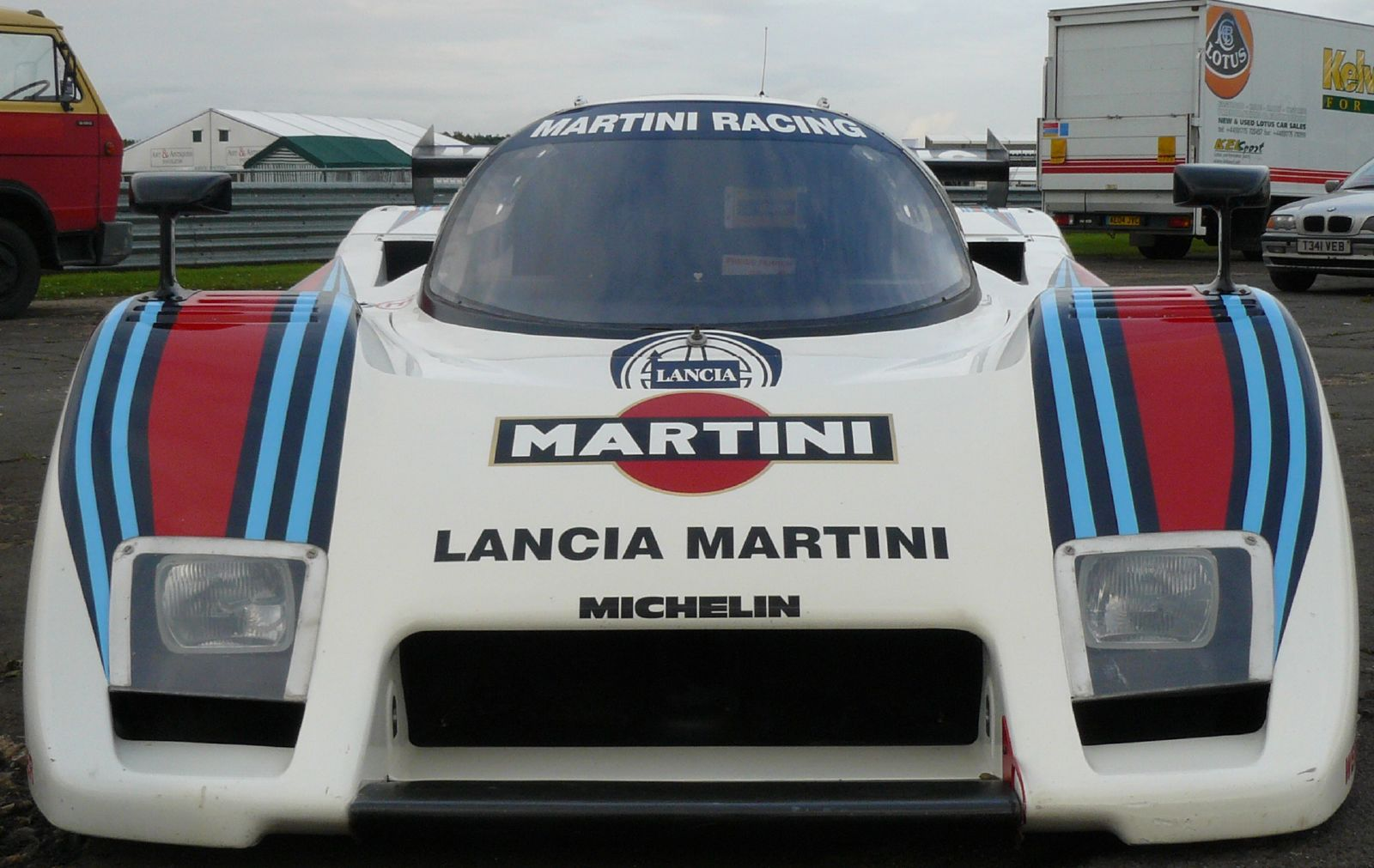
The large radiator opening in the front of an LC2. The additional brake cooling ducts are beneath the headlights.

Lancia lacked a production engine large enough to base a racing engine on, leaving the company to turn to outside sources. Since Lancia were owned by the Fiat Group, they were able to seek the assistance of fellow Fiat company Ferrari. Ferrari allowed Lancia to adapt the new naturally aspirated 3.0 litres (183 cu in) four valve V8 which had been introduced in the Ferrari 308 GTBi QV in 1982. The development of the engine was assigned by Enzo Ferrari to Nicola Materazzi, then Chief Engineer in the Racing Department. The development was done in parallel with that of the F114B powering the GTO and both engines were intended with high duty in mind, with one difference being that the GTO engine would use IHI turbos for the road. The basic engine architecture was heavily redesigned for racing purposes and the engine was reduced in capacity to 2.6 litres (159 cu in) and two KKK turbochargers were added to help the engine provide the fuel economy and power necessary. The specific engine displacement was chosen because of the possibility of using the same engine in the North American CART series. The engine was initially connected to a Hewland five-speed manual gearbox, which was replaced by an Abarth-cased unit in 1984.

Design work on the chassis was split between Italian specialist racing car manufacturers Abarth and Dallara, the latter of which built the aluminium monocoque and the kevlar and carbon fibre bodywork in their factory. The LC2 featured a large intake for the radiators in the center of the nose of the car just as the LC1 had, unlike the contemporary Porsche 956s which drew all their air from behind and to the sides of the cockpit. This air was also directed through the side bodywork to feed the intercoolers for the turbochargers. Inlets for the rear brake cooling ducts were also integrated onto the side bodywork of the car, immediately behind the doors. At the rear, a pontoon-style design was adapted to the fenders with the large wing bridging across the pontoons. The rear diffusers exited between the pontoons and underneath the wing.

The LC2s were modified over their lifetime, with a multitude of modifications being made each season to the cars' aerodynamics, including adapting brake duct inlets beneath the headlights. The Ferrari V8 was modified in 1984, bringing the displacement back up to 3.0-litres in an attempt to increase reliability and horsepower while improved engine electronics from Magneti Marelli allowed the larger engine to use the same amount of fuel as the previous version. The engine developed just under 840 HP at 9000 rpm with massive 800 lb.-ft. at 4800 rpm, the twin KKK turbos were running at 3.0 bar boost and would start pulling from 3000 rpm. In total, seven LC2s were built under the direction of Lancia, while a further two were built for Gianni Mussato without official backing after the program had ended.

After the program had ended, Abarth acquired an LC2 and fitted it with the 3.5-litre Alfa Romeo Tipo 1035 V10 engine from the Alfa Romeo 164 Procar, and developed it under the project name SE047. The SE047 was an early development of the Alfa Romeo SE 048SP project in 1988. The SE047's engine was ultimately not utilized in the later stages of the SE 048SP development.

== Racing history ==
=== 1983 ===
The LC2s made their debut at the beginning of the 1983 season, being run under the Martini Racing name and painted in the Martini & Rossi colours, as well as initially using Italian Pirelli radial tyres. The first race of the season was also Lancia's home event, the 1000 km of Monza. The LC2 proved more powerful than the 956s, taking the pole position by nearly a second over Joest Racing's 956. However tyre problems took the leading Lancia out of the lead of the race, and the second team car finished twelve laps behind the winning 956.

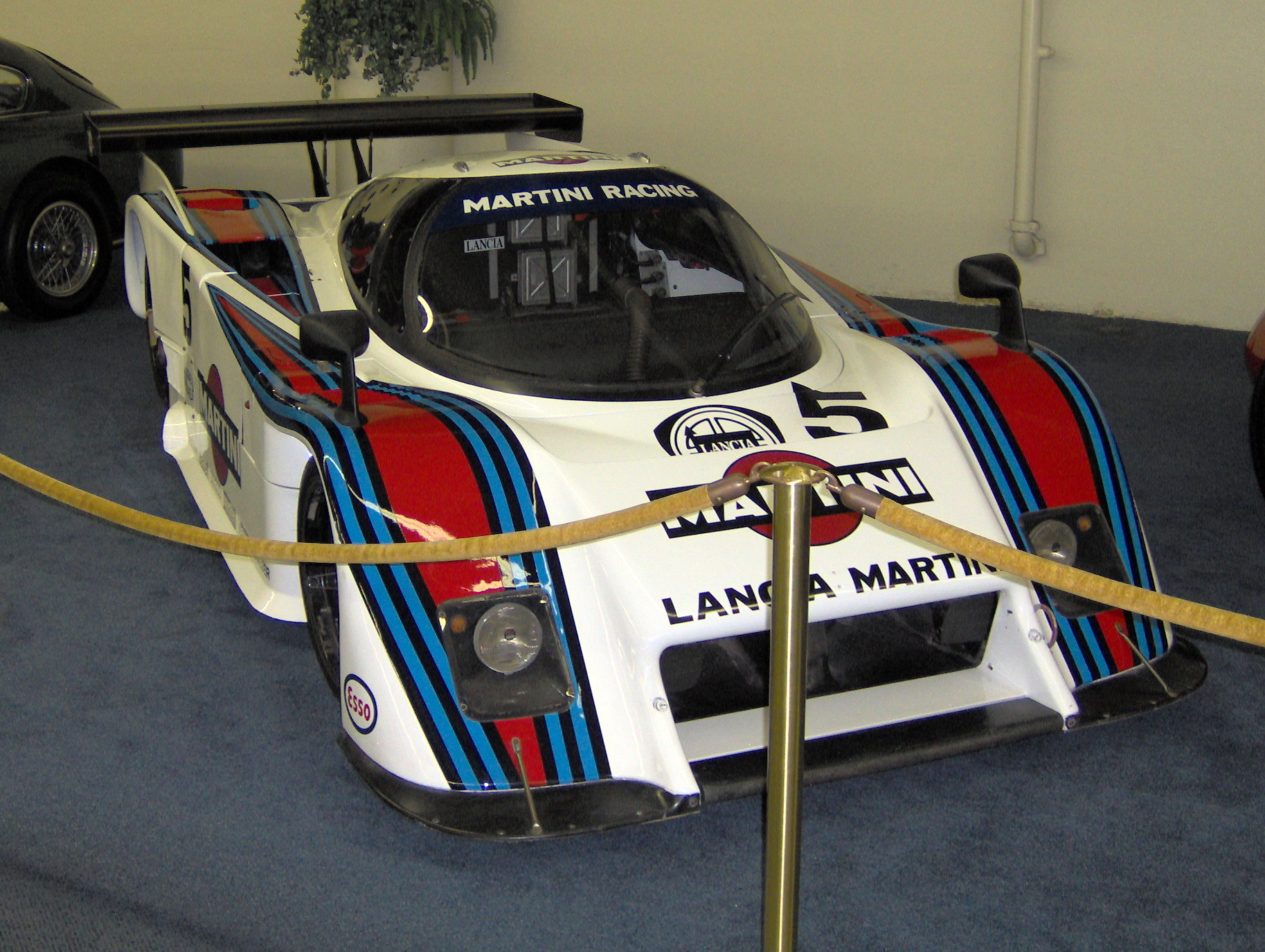
The LC2 in its 1983 form

Tyre problems and engine reliability hampered the LC2s all season; the Pirelli tyres were eventually replaced with British Dunlop crossply tyres, although the car's suspension had been optimised for the Italian product. Neither car managed to finish a race again until the fifth round, the 1000 km of Spa. There the two Martini Racing LC2s as well as the privateer Mirabella LC2 all finished, but only after suffering various difficulties that dropped them from contention earlier in the race. The LC2s finally ran reliably at the European Endurance Championship round at Brands Hatch, where Michele Alboreto and Riccardo Patrese finished fourth. Lancia chose not to participate in the World Sportscar event in Japan, instead running the European Endurance event at Imola. The choice paid off as Teo Fabi and Hans Heyer earned the LC2 its first victory, although the factory Porsche team had not participated in this event. Lancia finished off the season with back-to-back second-place finishes at Mugello and Kyalami. Even with their difficulties Lancia took second place in the World Constructors Championship, although they earned only 32 points to Porsche's 100.

=== 1984 ===
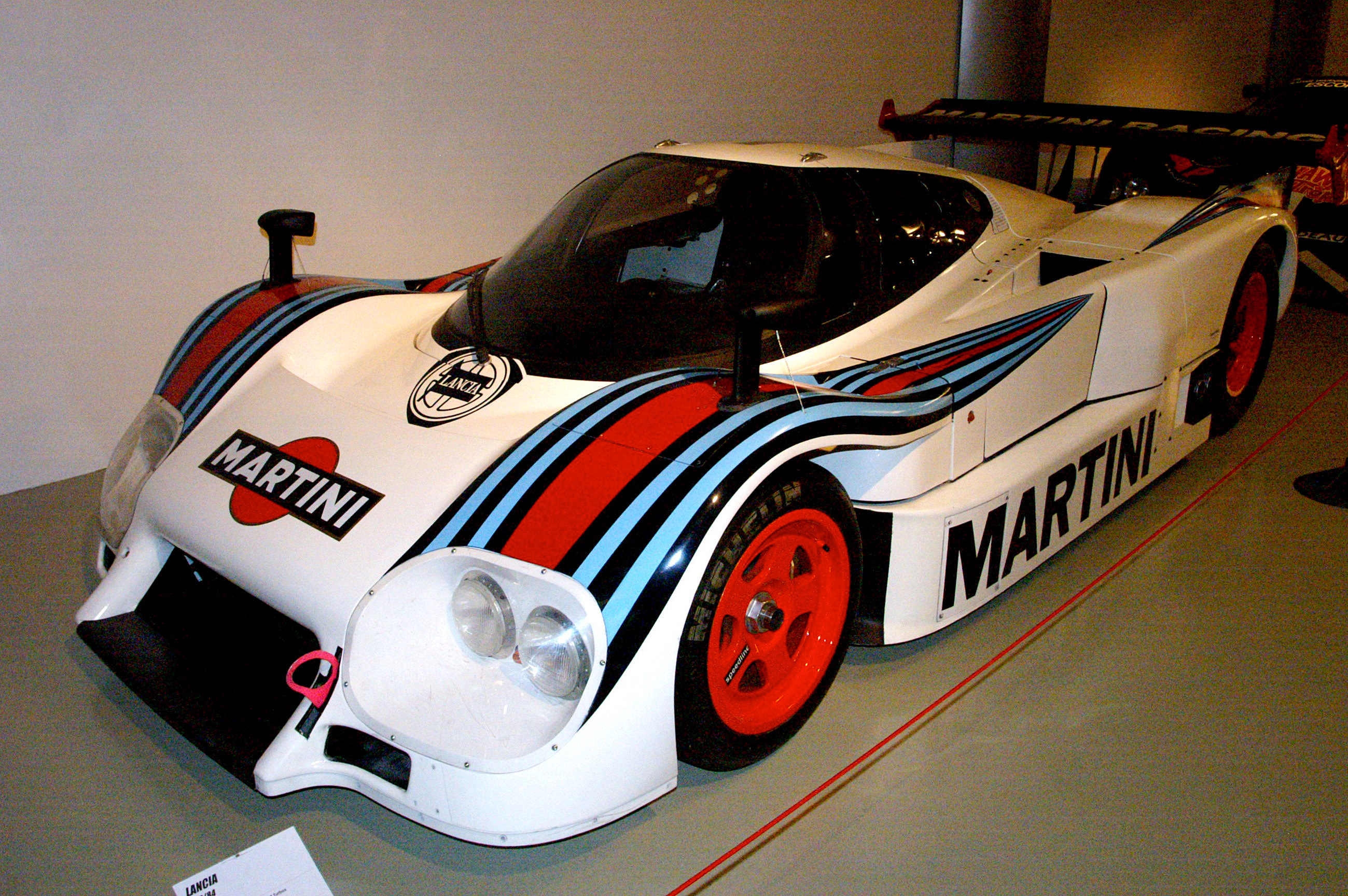
A 1984 LC2 with revised bodywork

The revised LC2s appeared once again at the 1000 km of Monza to start the 1984 season, with suspension redesigned to work with the Dunlop tyres. Lancia opened the season with a podium finish, followed by another pole position on the fast Silverstone Circuit for the 1000 km of Silverstone led to a fourth-place finish. For the 24 Hours of Le Mans, both cars qualified on the front row in the absence of the Rothmans Porsche team, with Bob Wollek's pole time of 3:17.11 being some 11 seconds faster than the fastest Porsche 956's from Joest Racing who occupied the second row. Wollek and Nannini led at mid-race after battles with the Kremer Porsche of Vern Schuppan (the defending race winner) and Alan Jones, only for problems with the gearboxes on both cars to lose the team their lead. Wollek and Nannini at least proved the potential reliability of the LC2 by completing the full race distance and finishing in eighth position, with Nannini setting the races fastest lap of 3:28.90. The team also ran a private entry LC2 in the race for drivers Pierluigi Martini, Xavier Lapeyre and Beppe Gabbiani. This car crashed heavily in qualifying, with most observers believing it would require a new chassis to be repaired. As changing a chassis was prohibited by the Automobile Club de l'Ouest, the car was repaired in time to qualify and race, though rumours persisted that Lancia had broken the rules and used a new chassis to replace the original.

The team took a brief hiatus after Brands Hatch, returning for Imola once again but they were unable to repeat their previous performance, both cars crashing out. Lancia once again skipped Fuji in Japan, returning for the South African round at Kyalami where Patrese and Nannini led home a 1-2 finish. Although the LC2 earned its second win, none of the leading Porsche teams attended the event in protest of the countries Apartheid laws. Unable to challenge further for the Constructors or Drivers Championships, the team did not attend the final round of the year at Sandown Park in Melbourne, Australia. Although the cars were fast, over the year Autocourse concluded that the team had had so many different problems that poor preparation must be the cause.

=== 1985 ===
1985 was a year in which Martini Racing needed to show the potential winning capabilities of the LC2 in order for Lancia to continue to fund a project that had seen limited success thus far. The cars were further revised and were running on Michelin radial tyres. The season opened with an LC2 taking pole position at Mugello by 1.7 seconds ahead of the factory Porsche. Although the pole position car's engine did not last, the other team car finished fourth. For the 1000 km of Monza, the LC2s were nearly four seconds ahead of the closest Porsche in qualifying, and led the race early on. However, while Patrese and Nannini were in third place and on the same lap as the leaders, a tree fell across the track and caused the race to be stopped early. On pole once again at Silverstone, one of the LC2s was in the lead of the race until a wheel bearing failure in the closing laps forced Nannini to pit, forfeiting the lead. Although the LC2s did not take pole at Le Mans, they led the race early. Reliability issues again forced the team to drop out of the lead. They eventually finished the race in sixth and seventh places. A fuel pump failure also dropped the team out of contention at the Hockenheimring.

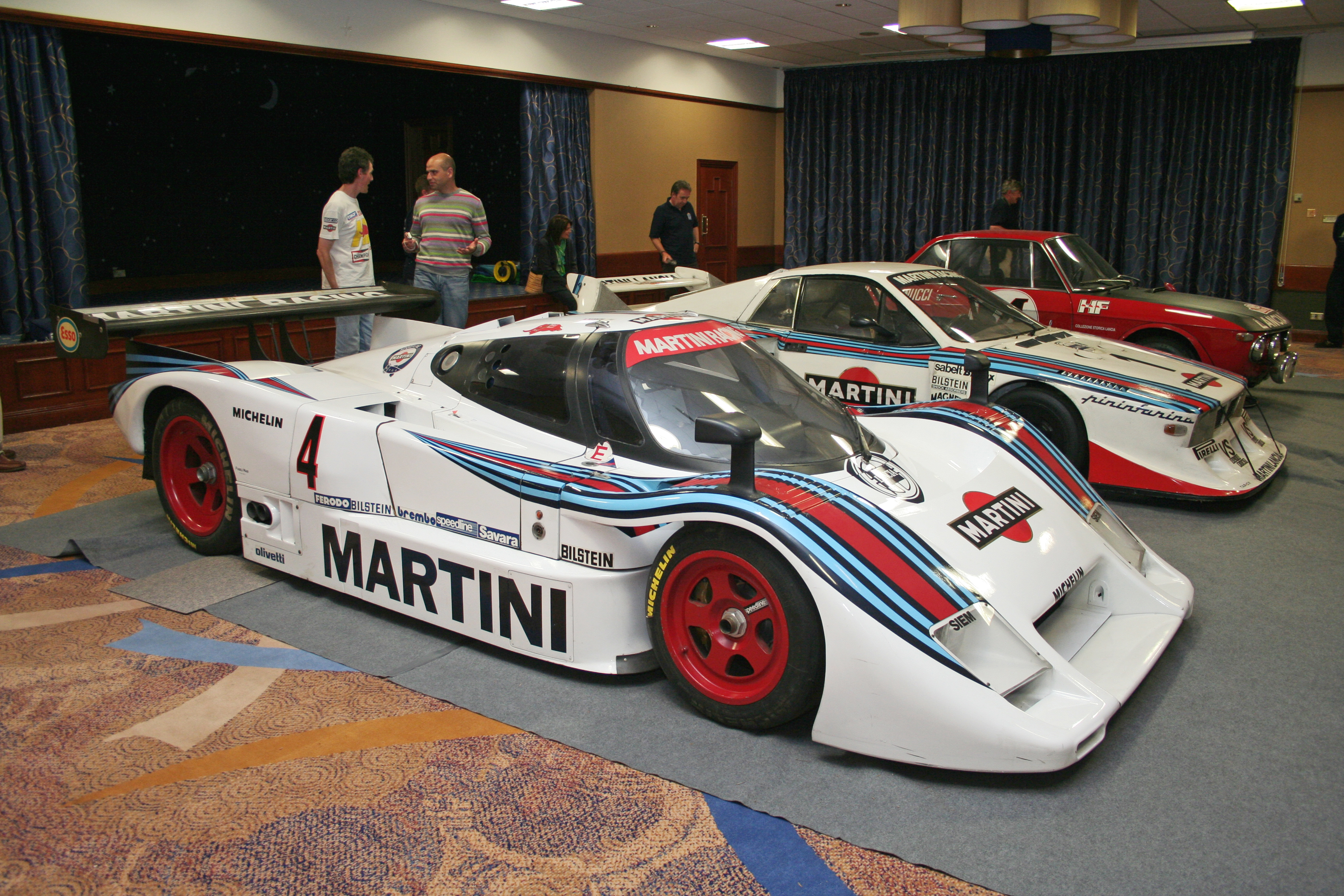
An LC2 in the final form used by the factory team in 1985 and 1986.

The team was competitive throughout the race at Spa, with the LC2 of Wollek, Patrese, and Mauro Baldi leading the factory Porsche towards the end of the event. The Lancia were leading when the race organisers chose to end the race out of respect for driver Stefan Bellof who had been killed in an accident earlier in the event. Even with the shortened race, Lancia were able to celebrate their first victory over the factory Rothmans Porsche team. The following event, the 1000 km of Brands Hatch, saw the LC2s leading en route to a potential win, only to hit one another and finish third and fourth. Once again unable to challenge Porsche in the championships, Lancia chose not to participate in the final two rounds. However they still earned second in the Teams Championship, just ahead of the privateer Joest Racing Porsche.

=== 1986 ===
Seeing some remaining potential in the LC2, Lancia allowed the project to continue into 1986, but only as a one-car effort. The year opened with a sprint event at Monza, with the speed of the LC2 allowing it to take second place, less than a minute behind the winning Rothmans Porsche. The first endurance event at Silverstone however saw a return of the LC2's reliability problems, as according to the team the fuel pump failed and the car was unable to finish. According to Autosport magazine, in fact, the car ran out of fuel after delays and the team putting the softest available tyres on the car and employing qualifying boost in order to take the lap record Feeling the cars were still not reliable enough nor fuel efficient enough to compete with the evolved Porsche 962C, Lancia determined that the project was no longer worth supporting, and Martini Racing pulled out of the championship. Lancia turned their full attention instead to their efforts in the World Rally Championship.

=== Privateers ===
Privateer teams initially attempted to carry on with older LC2 chassis. Gianni Mussato unsuccessfully entered two races in 1986 before leaving the championship, returning for one-off appearances in 1987 and 1988. The Mussato car moved to Dollop Racing later in 1988, where it was again unsuccessful and failed to finish any of the races that season. Mussato returned in 1989 with a newly built LC2, but once again the car struggled to finish any races during the season. His team made a final attempt in 1990, running just the 24 Hours of Le Mans, but the outcome was the same. Even into 1991, the Veneto Equipe team turned to the LC2 to contend the World Sportscar Championship. As with all previous privateer efforts the car was unable to compete, failing to even qualify for some of the races, let alone finish them.
