= David Mercer (racing driver) =

British former racing driver (born 1949)

David Mercer (born 21 August 1949) is a British former racing driver.

Mercer began his racing career in Sportscars in 1977 competing in Group 5/6 . He drove part-time in the FIA World Endurance Championship and Thundersports races from 1982 to 1989. He made one [Interserie] start in 1992 and made 11 British Formula 3000/Two starts from 1992 to 1994, finishing 13th in the championship those two years. He then went on to race a 1983 Ram in Historic F1 then moved on to racing a 1990 Spice Group C car in historic events with much success and which he still currently races to a high level.

== Le Mans History ==
=== 1984 ===
In the 1984 Le Mans race, Mercer started in 46th place and finished in 39th. In the race, he ran 96/360 laps. He was sponsored by Castrol and drove a BMW M1.
