= 1983 European Endurance Championship =

1983 European Sportscar Championship

Seasons
- ← 1978 none →

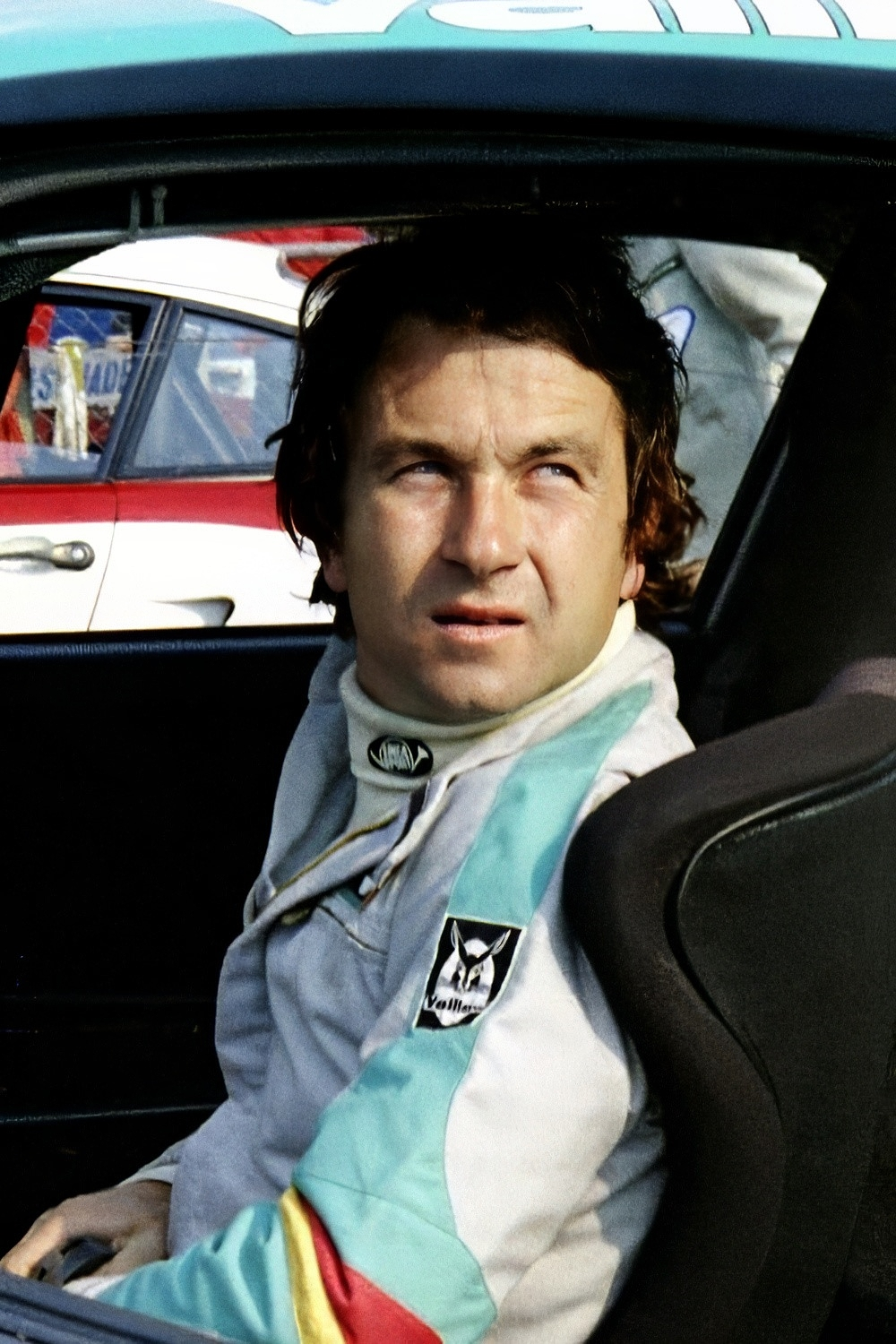
Bob Wollek (pictured in 1976) won the European Endurance Championship for Drivers

The 1983 FIA European Endurance Championship for Drivers was the seventh season and third iteration of the European Sportscar Championship auto racing series. It was contested by drivers competing in Group C sports cars, Group C Junior sports cars, and Group B GT cars in eight race events from 10 April to 23 October 1983. Frenchmen Bob Wollek won the championship driving for the Sorga S.A. Porsche team.

The European championship was held in conjunction with the 1983 World Endurance Championship, sharing the first five race events before departing for outside Europe. As such, many drivers and teams competed in both championships.

== Schedule ==
All events covered a distance of 1,000 km (620 mi) with exception of the 24 Hours of Le Mans. The first five events were shared with the World Endurance Championship. The Monza round was shared with the Italian Championship Group 6, although their race lasted only 14 laps and the cars did not complete the full endurance race distance.

Round	Race	Circuit	Date
1	Trofeo Filippo Caracciolo	Autodromo Nazionale di Monza, Monza, Italy	10 April
2	Grand Prix International 1000 km	Silverstone Circuit, Silverstone, United Kingdom	8 May
3	Bitburger ADAC-1000-km-Rennen	Nürburgring, Nürburg, West Germany	29 May
4	24 Hours of Le Mans	Circuit de la Sarthe, Le Mans, France	18–19 June
5	Trophee Diners Club 1000 km Spa-Francorchamps	Circuit de Spa-Francorchamps, Stavelot, Belgium	4 September
6	Grand Prix International Magazine 1000 km	Brands Hatch, West Kingsdown, United Kingdom	18 September
7	1000 Kilometres di Imola	Autodromo Enzo Ferrari, Imola, Italy	16 October
8	1000 Kilometres di Mugello	Mugello Circuit, Scarperia e San Piero, Italy	23 October

== Entries ==
=== Group C ===
Entrant	Car	Engine	Tyre	No.	Drivers	Rounds
(West Germany) Rothmans Porsche	Porsche 956	Porsche Type-935/76 2.6 L Turbo Flat-6	D	1	(Belgium) Jacky Ickx	1–6
(West Germany) Rothmans Porsche	Porsche 956	Porsche Type-935/76 2.6 L Turbo Flat-6	D	1	(West Germany) Jochen Mass	1–3, 5–6
(West Germany) Rothmans Porsche	Porsche 956	Porsche Type-935/76 2.6 L Turbo Flat-6	D	1	(United Kingdom) Derek Bell	4
(West Germany) Rothmans Porsche	Porsche 956	Porsche Type-935/76 2.6 L Turbo Flat-6	D	2	(United Kingdom) Derek Bell	1–3, 5–6
(West Germany) Rothmans Porsche	Porsche 956	Porsche Type-935/76 2.6 L Turbo Flat-6	D	2	(United States) Al Holbert	1
(West Germany) Rothmans Porsche	Porsche 956	Porsche Type-935/76 2.6 L Turbo Flat-6	D	2	(West Germany) Stefan Bellof	2–6
(West Germany) Rothmans Porsche	Porsche 956	Porsche Type-935/76 2.6 L Turbo Flat-6	D	2	(West Germany) Jochen Mass	4
(West Germany) Rothmans Porsche	Porsche 956	Porsche Type-935/76 2.6 L Turbo Flat-6	D	3	(United States) Al Holbert	4
(West Germany) Rothmans Porsche	Porsche 956	Porsche Type-935/76 2.6 L Turbo Flat-6	D	3	(United States) Hurley Haywood	4
(West Germany) Rothmans Porsche	Porsche 956	Porsche Type-935/76 2.6 L Turbo Flat-6	D	3	(Australia) Vern Schuppan	4
(Italy) Martini Racing	Lancia LC2/83	Ferrari 268C 2.6 L Turbo V8	P D	4	(Italy) Michele Alboreto	1–4, 6
(Italy) Martini Racing	Lancia LC2/83	Ferrari 268C 2.6 L Turbo V8	P D	4	(Italy) Riccardo Patrese	1–3, 5–6, 8
(Italy) Martini Racing	Lancia LC2/83	Ferrari 268C 2.6 L Turbo V8	P D	4	(Italy) Teo Fabi	4–5, 7
(Italy) Martini Racing	Lancia LC2/83	Ferrari 268C 2.6 L Turbo V8	P D	4	(Italy) Alessandro Nannini	4, 8
(Italy) Martini Racing	Lancia LC2/83	Ferrari 268C 2.6 L Turbo V8	P D	4	(West Germany) Hans Heyer	7
(Italy) Martini Racing	Lancia LC2/83	Ferrari 268C 2.6 L Turbo V8	P D	5	(Italy) Piercarlo Ghinzani	1–2, 4–5, 8
(Italy) Martini Racing	Lancia LC2/83	Ferrari 268C 2.6 L Turbo V8	P D	5	(Italy) Teo Fabi	1–2, 4–5
(Italy) Martini Racing	Lancia LC2/83	Ferrari 268C 2.6 L Turbo V8	P D	5	(West Germany) Hans Heyer	4, 8
(Italy) Martini Racing	Lancia LC2/83	Ferrari 268C 2.6 L Turbo V8	P D	5	(Italy) Michele Alboreto	5
(Italy) Martini Racing	Lancia LC2/83	Ferrari 268C 2.6 L Turbo V8	P D	5	(Italy) Alessandro Nannini	6–7
(Italy) Martini Racing	Lancia LC2/83	Ferrari 268C 2.6 L Turbo V8	P D	5	(Italy) Beppe Gabbiani	6–7
(Italy) Martini Racing	Lancia LC2/83	Ferrari 268C 2.6 L Turbo V8	P D	6	(Italy) Alessandro Nannini	4
(Italy) Martini Racing	Lancia LC2/83	Ferrari 268C 2.6 L Turbo V8	P D	6	(Italy) Paolo Barilla	4
(Italy) Martini Racing	Lancia LC2/83	Ferrari 268C 2.6 L Turbo V8	P D	6	(France) Jean-Claude Andruet	4
(Italy) Euro TV-Mirabella Racing	Lancia LC2/83	Ferrari 268C 2.6 L Turbo V8	D	6	(Italy) Giorgio Francia	3, 5–8
(Italy) Euro TV-Mirabella Racing	Lancia LC2/83	Ferrari 268C 2.6 L Turbo V8	D	6	(Italy) Paolo Barilla	3, 5–8
(Italy) Euro TV-Mirabella Racing	Lancia LC2/83	Ferrari 268C 2.6 L Turbo V8	D	6	(Italy) Piercarlo Ghinzani	3
(West Germany) Sorga S.A.	Porsche 956	Porsche Type-935/76 2.6 L Turbo Flat-6	D	8; 11	(France) Bob Wollek	All
(West Germany) Sorga S.A.	Porsche 956	Porsche Type-935/76 2.6 L Turbo Flat-6	D	8; 11	(Belgium) Thierry Boutsen	1
(West Germany) Sorga S.A.	Porsche 956	Porsche Type-935/76 2.6 L Turbo Flat-6	D	8; 11	(Sweden) Stefan Johansson	2–8
(West Germany) Sorga S.A.	Porsche 956	Porsche Type-935/76 2.6 L Turbo Flat-6	D	8; 11	(West Germany) Klaus Ludwig	4
(West Germany) Sorga S.A.	Porsche 956	Porsche Type-935/76 2.6 L Turbo Flat-6	D	12	(West Germany) Clemens Schickentanz	1–2, 4
(West Germany) Sorga S.A.	Porsche 956	Porsche Type-935/76 2.6 L Turbo Flat-6	D	12	(West Germany) Hans Heyer	1–2, 5
(West Germany) Sorga S.A.	Porsche 956	Porsche Type-935/76 2.6 L Turbo Flat-6	D	12	(West Germany) Rolf Stommelen	1
(West Germany) Sorga S.A.	Porsche 956	Porsche Type-935/76 2.6 L Turbo Flat-6	D	12	(West Germany) Volkert Merl	2, 4–5, 7–8
(West Germany) Sorga S.A.	Porsche 956	Porsche Type-935/76 2.6 L Turbo Flat-6	D	12	(Colombia) Mauricio DeNarvaez	4
(West Germany) Sorga S.A.	Porsche 956	Porsche Type-935/76 2.6 L Turbo Flat-6	D	12	(France) Bob Wollek	5
(West Germany) Sorga S.A.	Porsche 956	Porsche Type-935/76 2.6 L Turbo Flat-6	D	12	(West Germany) Dieter Schornstein	7–8
(West Germany) Sorga S.A.	Porsche 956	Porsche Type-935/76 2.6 L Turbo Flat-6	D	12	(Italy) Gianpiero Moretti	8
(West Germany) Joest Racing	Porsche 936C	Porsche Type-935 2.7 L Turbo Flat-6	D	15	(Belgium) Jean-Michel Martin	2, 4–5
(West Germany) Joest Racing	Porsche 936C	Porsche Type-935 2.7 L Turbo Flat-6	D	15	(Belgium) Marc Duez	2, 4
(West Germany) Joest Racing	Porsche 936C	Porsche Type-935 2.7 L Turbo Flat-6	D	15	(Belgium) Philippe Martin	2, 4
(West Germany) Joest Racing	Porsche 936C	Porsche Type-935 2.7 L Turbo Flat-6	D	15	(West Germany) "John Winter"	5
(West Germany) Joest Racing	Porsche 936C	Porsche Type-935 2.7 L Turbo Flat-6	D	15	(West Germany) Dieter Schornstein	5–6
(West Germany) Joest Racing	Porsche 936C	Porsche Type-935 2.7 L Turbo Flat-6	D	15	(West Germany) Volkert Merl	6
(West Germany) Joest Racing	Porsche 936C	Porsche Type-935 2.7 L Turbo Flat-6	D	15	(West Germany) Hans Heyer	6
(United Kingdom) John Fitzpatrick Racing	Porsche 956	Porsche Type-935/76 2.6 L Turbo Flat-6	G	11; 16	(United Kingdom) John Fitzpatrick	All
(United Kingdom) John Fitzpatrick Racing	Porsche 956	Porsche Type-935/76 2.6 L Turbo Flat-6	G	11; 16	(United Kingdom) David Hobbs	1–5, 7–8
(United Kingdom) John Fitzpatrick Racing	Porsche 956	Porsche Type-935/76 2.6 L Turbo Flat-6	G	11; 16	(Austria) Dieter Quester	4
(United Kingdom) John Fitzpatrick Racing	Porsche 956	Porsche Type-935/76 2.6 L Turbo Flat-6	G	11; 16	(United Kingdom) Derek Warwick	6
(United Kingdom) John Fitzpatrick Racing	Porsche 956	Porsche Type-935/76 2.6 L Turbo Flat-6	G	11; 16	(Belgium) Thierry Boutsen	8
(United Kingdom) John Fitzpatrick Racing	Porsche 956	Porsche Type-935/76 2.6 L Turbo Flat-6	G	16	(United Kingdom) Guy Edwards	4
(United Kingdom) John Fitzpatrick Racing	Porsche 956	Porsche Type-935/76 2.6 L Turbo Flat-6	G	16	(United Kingdom) Rupert Keegan	4
(United Kingdom) John Fitzpatrick Racing	Porsche 956	Porsche Type-935/76 2.6 L Turbo Flat-6	G	16	(United Kingdom) John Fitzpatrick	4
(United States) Henn's T-Bird Swap Shop	Porsche 956	Porsche Type-935/76 2.6 L Turbo Flat-6	G	47	(United States) Preston Henn	2, 4, 6
(United States) Henn's T-Bird Swap Shop	Porsche 956	Porsche Type-935/76 2.6 L Turbo Flat-6	G	47	(United Kingdom) Rupert Keegan	2
(United States) Henn's T-Bird Swap Shop	Porsche 956	Porsche Type-935/76 2.6 L Turbo Flat-6	G	47	(United Kingdom) Guy Edwards	2
(United States) Henn's T-Bird Swap Shop	Porsche 956	Porsche Type-935/76 2.6 L Turbo Flat-6	G	47	(France) Jean-Louis Schlesser	4
(United States) Henn's T-Bird Swap Shop	Porsche 956	Porsche Type-935/76 2.6 L Turbo Flat-6	G	47	(France) Claude Ballot-Léna	4
(United States) Henn's T-Bird Swap Shop	Porsche 956	Porsche Type-935/76 2.6 L Turbo Flat-6	G	47	(Italy) Divina Galica	6
(United States) Henn's T-Bird Swap Shop	Porsche 956	Porsche Type-935/76 2.6 L Turbo Flat-6	G	47	(United Kingdom) David Sutherland	6
(France) Yves Courage	Cougar C01B	Ford Cosworth DFL 3.3 L V8	M	13	(France) Yves Courage	4, 8
(France) Yves Courage	Cougar C01B	Ford Cosworth DFL 3.3 L V8	M	13	(France) Michel Dubois	4
(France) Yves Courage	Cougar C01B	Ford Cosworth DFL 3.3 L V8	M	13	(United Kingdom) Alain de Cadenet	4
(France) Yves Courage	Cougar C01B	Ford Cosworth DFL 3.3 L V8	M	13	(Italy) Aldo Bertuzzi	8
(France) Yves Courage	Cougar C01B	Ford Cosworth DFL 3.3 L V8	M	13	(Italy) Gianni Giudici	8
(United Kingdom) Canon Racing	Porsche 956	Porsche Type-935/76 2.6 L Turbo Flat-6	D	14	(Netherlands) Jan Lammers	1–6
(United Kingdom) Canon Racing	Porsche 956	Porsche Type-935/76 2.6 L Turbo Flat-6	D	14	(United Kingdom) Richard Lloyd	1–2, 4, 6
(United Kingdom) Canon Racing	Porsche 956	Porsche Type-935/76 2.6 L Turbo Flat-6	D	14	(United Kingdom) Tiff Needell	1
(United Kingdom) Canon Racing	Porsche 956	Porsche Type-935/76 2.6 L Turbo Flat-6	D	14	(Belgium) Thierry Boutsen	2, 5
(United Kingdom) Canon Racing	Porsche 956	Porsche Type-935/76 2.6 L Turbo Flat-6	D	14	(United Kingdom) Jonathan Palmer	3–4, 6–8
(United Kingdom) Canon Racing	Porsche 956	Porsche Type-935/76 2.6 L Turbo Flat-6	D	14	(Finland) Keke Rosberg	3
(United Kingdom) Canon Racing	Porsche 956	Porsche Type-935/76 2.6 L Turbo Flat-6	D	14	(United Kingdom) Derek Bell	7–8
(United Kingdom) Canon Racing	Porsche 956	Porsche Type-935/76 2.6 L Turbo Flat-6	D	14	(Finland) Henri Toivonen	7–8
(West Germany) Boss-Obermaier Racing	Porsche 956	Porsche Type-935/76 2.6 L Turbo Flat-6	D	18	(West Germany) Axel Plankenhorn	All
(West Germany) Boss-Obermaier Racing	Porsche 956	Porsche Type-935/76 2.6 L Turbo Flat-6	D	18	(West Germany) Jürgen Lässig	All
(West Germany) Boss-Obermaier Racing	Porsche 956	Porsche Type-935/76 2.6 L Turbo Flat-6	D	18	(West Germany) Jürgen Barth	1
(West Germany) Boss-Obermaier Racing	Porsche 956	Porsche Type-935/76 2.6 L Turbo Flat-6	D	18	(West Germany) Harold Grohs	2
(West Germany) Boss-Obermaier Racing	Porsche 956	Porsche Type-935/76 2.6 L Turbo Flat-6	D	18	(West Germany) Hans Heyer	3
(West Germany) Boss-Obermaier Racing	Porsche 956	Porsche Type-935/76 2.6 L Turbo Flat-6	D	18	(South Africa) Desiré Wilson	4
(West Germany) Boss-Obermaier Racing	Porsche 956	Porsche Type-935/76 2.6 L Turbo Flat-6	D	18	(Belgium) Hervé Regout	5–8
(United States) Cooke Racing	Lola T610	Ford Cosworth DFL 4.0 L V8	G	20	(United States) Ralph Kent-Cooke	4
(United States) Cooke Racing	Lola T610	Ford Cosworth DFL 4.0 L V8	G	20	(United States) Jim Adams	4
(United States) Cooke Racing	Lola T610	Ford Cosworth DFL 4.0 L V8	G	20	(France) François Servanin	4
(West Germany) Porsche Kremer Racing	Porsche 956	Porsche Type-935/76 2.6 L Turbo Flat-6	G	21	(Australia) Vern Schuppan	2
(West Germany) Porsche Kremer Racing	Porsche 956	Porsche Type-935/76 2.6 L Turbo Flat-6	G	21	(Australia) Alan Jones	2
(West Germany) Porsche Kremer Racing	Porsche 956	Porsche Type-935/76 2.6 L Turbo Flat-6	G	21	(United States) Mario Andretti	4
(West Germany) Porsche Kremer Racing	Porsche 956	Porsche Type-935/76 2.6 L Turbo Flat-6	G	21	(United States) Michael Andretti	4
(West Germany) Porsche Kremer Racing	Porsche 956	Porsche Type-935/76 2.6 L Turbo Flat-6	G	21	(France) Philippe Alliot	4
(West Germany) Porsche Kremer Racing	Porsche 956	Porsche Type-935/76 2.6 L Turbo Flat-6	G	21	(United Kingdom) Derek Warwick	5
(West Germany) Porsche Kremer Racing	Porsche 956	Porsche Type-935/76 2.6 L Turbo Flat-6	G	21	(Austria) Franz Konrad	5
(West Germany) Porsche Kremer Racing	Kremer CK5	Porsche Type-935 3.0 L Turbo Flat-6	G	22	(United Kingdom) Derek Warwick	4
(West Germany) Porsche Kremer Racing	Kremer CK5	Porsche Type-935 3.0 L Turbo Flat-6	G	22	(West Germany) Frank Jelinski	4
(West Germany) Porsche Kremer Racing	Kremer CK5	Porsche Type-935 3.0 L Turbo Flat-6	G	22	(France) Patrick Gaillard	4
(West Germany) Porsche Kremer Racing	Kremer CK5	Porsche Type-935 3.0 L Turbo Flat-6	G	22	(Netherlands) Kees Kroesemeijer	5–6
(West Germany) Porsche Kremer Racing	Kremer CK5	Porsche Type-935 3.0 L Turbo Flat-6	G	22	(Netherlands) Huub Rothengatter	5
(West Germany) Porsche Kremer Racing	Kremer CK5	Porsche Type-935 3.0 L Turbo Flat-6	G	22	(Austria) Franz Konrad	6
Ford France	Rondeau M482	Ford Cosworth DFL 4.0 L V8	M	24	(France) Henri Pescarolo	4
Ford France	Rondeau M482	Ford Cosworth DFL 4.0 L V8	M	24	(Belgium) Thierry Boutsen	4
Ford France	Rondeau M482	Ford Cosworth DFL 4.0 L V8	M	25	(France) Philippe Streiff	4
Ford France	Rondeau M482	Ford Cosworth DFL 4.0 L V8	M	25	(France) Jean-Pierre Jaussaud	4
Ford France	Rondeau M482	Ford Cosworth DFL 4.0 L V8	M	25	(France) Michel Ferté	4
Ford France	Rondeau M482	Ford Cosworth DFL 4.0 L V8	M	26	(France) Jean Rondeau	4
Ford France	Rondeau M482	Ford Cosworth DFL 4.0 L V8	M	26	(France) Alain Ferté	4
Ford France	Rondeau M482	Ford Cosworth DFL 4.0 L V8	M	26	(France) Michel Ferté	4
(France) Jean Rondeau	Rondeau M379C	Ford Cosworth DFV 3.0 L V8	M	28	(France) Anne-Charlotte Verney	4
(France) Jean Rondeau	Rondeau M379C	Ford Cosworth DFV 3.0 L V8	M	28	(France) Joël Gouhier	4
(France) Jean Rondeau	Rondeau M379C	Ford Cosworth DFV 3.0 L V8	M	28	(United Kingdom) Vic Elford	4
(France) Jean Rondeau	Rondeau M382	Ford Cosworth DFL 3.3 L V8	M	72	(France) Xavier Lapeyre	4
(France) Jean Rondeau	Rondeau M382	Ford Cosworth DFL 3.3 L V8	M	72	(France) Dany Snobeck	4
(France) Jean Rondeau	Rondeau M382	Ford Cosworth DFL 3.3 L V8	M	72	(France) Alain Cudini	4
(France) Christian Bussi	Rondeau M382	Ford Cosworth DFL 3.3 L V8	D	29	(Belgium) Pascal Witmeur	4
(France) Christian Bussi	Rondeau M382	Ford Cosworth DFL 3.3 L V8	D	29	(Belgium) Daniël Herregods	4
(France) Christian Bussi	Rondeau M382	Ford Cosworth DFL 3.3 L V8	D	29	(Belgium) Jean-Paul Libert	4
(France) Pierre Yver	Rondeau M382	Ford Cosworth DFL 3.3 L V8	D	30	(France) Pierre Yver	4
(France) Pierre Yver	Rondeau M382	Ford Cosworth DFL 3.3 L V8	D	30	(France) Lucien Guitteny	4
(France) Pierre Yver	Rondeau M382	Ford Cosworth DFL 3.3 L V8	D	30	(Belgium) Bernard de Dryver	4
(Switzerland) Brun Motorsport GmbH	Porsche 956	Porsche Type-935/76 2.6 L Turbo Flat-6	D	33	(Switzerland) Walter Brun	5
(Switzerland) Brun Motorsport GmbH	Porsche 956	Porsche Type-935/76 2.6 L Turbo Flat-6	D	33	(West Germany) Hans-Joachim Stuck	5
(Switzerland) Brun Motorsport GmbH	Porsche 956	Porsche Type-935/76 2.6 L Turbo Flat-6	D	33	(West Germany) Harald Grohs	5
(Switzerland) Brun Motorsport GmbH	Sehcar SH C6	Ford Cosworth DFL 3.3 L V8	D	35; 36	(Switzerland) Walter Brun	2–3
(Switzerland) Brun Motorsport GmbH	Sehcar SH C6	Ford Cosworth DFL 3.3 L V8	D	35; 36	(West Germany) Hans-Joachim Stuck	2–3
(Switzerland) Brun Motorsport GmbH	Sehcar SH C6	Ford Cosworth DFL 3.3 L V8	D	35; 36	(Canada) Jacques Villeneuve	4
(Switzerland) Brun Motorsport GmbH	Sehcar SH C6	Ford Cosworth DFL 3.3 L V8	D	35; 36	(Canada) Ludwig Heimrath Jr.	4
(Switzerland) Brun Motorsport GmbH	Sehcar SH C6	Ford Cosworth DFL 3.3 L V8	D	35; 36	(Canada) David Deacon	4
(Switzerland) Brun Motorsport GmbH	Sehcar C830	Porsche Type-935/76 2.6 L Turbo Flat-6	D	37	(Switzerland) Walter Brun	4
(Switzerland) Brun Motorsport GmbH	Sehcar C830	Porsche Type-935/76 2.6 L Turbo Flat-6	D	37	(West Germany) Hans-Joachim Stuck	4
(Switzerland) Brun Motorsport GmbH	Sehcar C830	Porsche Type-935/76 2.6 L Turbo Flat-6	D	37	(West Germany) Harald Grohs	4
(Switzerland) Cheetah Car	Cheetah G603	Ford Cosworth DFL 4.0 L V8		34	(Switzerland) Loris Kessel	5, 7–8
(Switzerland) Cheetah Car	Cheetah G603	Ford Cosworth DFL 4.0 L V8		34	(France) Laurent Ferrier	5, 7–8
(Switzerland) Cheetah Car	Cheetah G603	Ford Cosworth DFL 4.0 L V8		34	(France) Jean-Pierre Jaussaud	5
(Switzerland) Cheetah Car	Cheetah G603	Ford Cosworth DFL 4.0 L V8		34	(Switzerland) Rolf Biland	7
(Japan) Dome Racing	Dome RC82	Ford Cosworth DFL 3.3 L V8		38	(United Kingdom) Chris Craft	4
(Japan) Dome Racing	Dome RC82	Ford Cosworth DFL 3.3 L V8		38	(United Kingdom) Nick Mason	4
(Japan) Dome Racing	Dome RC82	Ford Cosworth DFL 3.3 L V8		38	(Chile) Eliseo Salazar	4
(United Kingdom) Viscount Downe with Pace Petroleum	Nimrod NRA/C2B	Aston Martin DP1229 5.3 L V8	A	39	(United Kingdom) Ray Mallock	2, 4–6
(United Kingdom) Viscount Downe with Pace Petroleum	Nimrod NRA/C2B	Aston Martin DP1229 5.3 L V8	A	39	(United Kingdom) Mike Salmon	2, 4–6
(United Kingdom) Viscount Downe with Pace Petroleum	Nimrod NRA/C2B	Aston Martin DP1229 5.3 L V8	A	39	(United States) Steve Earle	4
(United Kingdom) EMKA Productions Ltd.	EMKA C83/1	Aston Martin 5.3 L V8		41	(United Kingdom) Tiff Needell	2, 4
(United Kingdom) EMKA Productions Ltd.	EMKA C83/1	Aston Martin 5.3 L V8		41	(United Kingdom) Steve O'Rourke	2, 4
(United Kingdom) EMKA Productions Ltd.	EMKA C83/1	Aston Martin 5.3 L V8		41	(United Kingdom) Jeff Allam	2
(United Kingdom) EMKA Productions Ltd.	EMKA C83/1	Aston Martin 5.3 L V8		41	(United Kingdom) Nick Faure	4
(United Kingdom) Richard Cleare Racing	Kremer CK5	Porsche Type-935 3.0 L Turbo Flat-6		42; 19	(United Kingdom) Richard Cleare	1–2, 4, 6
(United Kingdom) Richard Cleare Racing	Kremer CK5	Porsche Type-935 3.0 L Turbo Flat-6		42; 19	(United Kingdom) Tony Dron	1–2, 4, 6
(United Kingdom) Richard Cleare Racing	Kremer CK5	Porsche Type-935 3.0 L Turbo Flat-6		42; 19	(United States) Margie Smith-Haas	1
(United Kingdom) Richard Cleare Racing	Kremer CK5	Porsche Type-935 3.0 L Turbo Flat-6		42; 19	(United Kingdom) Richard Jones	4, 6
(United Kingdom) Peer Racing	Ford C100	Ford Cosworth DFL 3.3 L V8	G	43; 10	(Republic of Ireland) Martin Birrane	4, 6
(United Kingdom) Peer Racing	Ford C100	Ford Cosworth DFL 3.3 L V8	G	43; 10	(Republic of Ireland) David Kennedy	4, 6
(United Kingdom) Peer Racing	Ford C100	Ford Cosworth DFL 3.3 L V8	G	43; 10	(France) François Migault	4
(West Germany) Jägermeister Ford Zakspeed Team	Zakspeed C1/4	Zakspeed 1.9 L Turbo I4	G	43	(West Germany) Klaus Niedzwiedz	5
(West Germany) Jägermeister Ford Zakspeed Team	Zakspeed C1/4	Zakspeed 1.9 L Turbo I4	G	43	(West Germany) Klaus Ludwig	5
Sauber Racing Switzerland	Sauber C7	BMW M88 3.5 L I6	D	47	(United States) Tony Garcia	4
Sauber Racing Switzerland	Sauber C7	BMW M88 3.5 L I6	D	47	(United States) Albert Naon	4
Sauber Racing Switzerland	Sauber C7	BMW M88 3.5 L I6	D	47	(Colombia) Diego Montoya	4
(United Kingdom) Grid Motor Racing Ltd.	Grid S1	Ford Cosworth DFL 4.0 L V8	F	49; 48	(United Kingdom) Dudley Wood	4, 6
(United Kingdom) Grid Motor Racing Ltd.	Grid S1	Ford Cosworth DFL 4.0 L V8	F	49; 48	(United States) Fred Stiff	4
(United Kingdom) Grid Motor Racing Ltd.	Grid S1	Ford Cosworth DFL 4.0 L V8	F	49; 48	(United States) Ray Ratcliff	4
(United Kingdom) Grid Motor Racing Ltd.	Grid S1	Ford Cosworth DFL 4.0 L V8	F	49; 48	(Spain) Emilio de Villota	6
(United Kingdom) Grid Motor Racing Ltd.	Grid S1	Ford Cosworth DFL 4.0 L V8	F	49; 48	(United States) Skeeter McKitterick	6
(Italy) Sivama/Grifone	Lancia LC1	Lancia 1.4 L Turbo I4	D	51; 22; 57	(Italy) Joe Castellano	1
(Italy) Sivama/Grifone	Lancia LC1	Lancia 1.4 L Turbo I4	D	51; 22; 57	(Italy) Luigi Moreschi	1
(Italy) Sivama/Grifone	Lancia LC1	Lancia 1.4 L Turbo I4	D	51; 22; 57	(Argentina) Oscar Larrauri	2–4, 7–8
(Italy) Sivama/Grifone	Lancia LC1	Lancia 1.4 L Turbo I4	D	51; 22; 57	(Italy) Massimo Sigala	2–4
(Italy) Sivama/Grifone	Lancia LC1	Lancia 1.4 L Turbo I4	D	51; 22; 57	(Morocco) Max Cohen-Olivar	4
(Italy) Sivama/Grifone	Lancia LC1	Lancia 1.4 L Turbo I4	D	51; 22; 57	(Italy) "Gimax"	7–8
(Italy) Sivama/Grifone	Lancia LC1	Lancia 1.4 L Turbo I4	D	52; 23; 58	(Italy) Duilio Truffo	1–2
(Italy) Sivama/Grifone	Lancia LC1	Lancia 1.4 L Turbo I4	D	52; 23; 58	(Italy) Roberto Sigala	1
(Italy) Sivama/Grifone	Lancia LC1	Lancia 1.4 L Turbo I4	D	52; 23; 58	(Italy) Joe Castellano	2
(Italy) Sivama/Grifone	Lancia LC1	Lancia 1.4 L Turbo I4	D	52; 23; 58	(Italy) Fabrizio Tabaton	7
(Italy) Sivama/Grifone	Lancia LC1	Lancia 1.4 L Turbo I4	D	52; 23; 58	(Italy) Franco Cunico	7
(Italy) Sivama/Grifone	Lancia LC1	Lancia 1.4 L Turbo I4	D	52; 23; 58	(Italy) Claudio Giovanardi	7
(Italy) Sivama/Grifone	Lancia LC1	Lancia 1.4 L Turbo I4	D	52; 23; 58	(Italy) Mario Caliceti	8
(Italy) Sivama/Grifone	Lancia LC1	Lancia 1.4 L Turbo I4	D	52; 23; 58	(Italy) Odoardo Covoni	8
(Italy) A.S. Ecole Superieure de Tourisme	Lancia LC1	Lancia 1.4 L Turbo I4	D	53	(France) François Hesnault	4
(Italy) A.S. Ecole Superieure de Tourisme	Lancia LC1	Lancia 1.4 L Turbo I4	D	53	(France) Thierry Perrier	4
(Italy) A.S. Ecole Superieure de Tourisme	Lancia LC1	Lancia 1.4 L Turbo I4	D	53	(France) Bernard Salam	4
(United Kingdom) François Duret	De Cadenet LM	Ford Cosworth DFV 3.0 L V8		55	(United Kingdom) François Duret	2
(United Kingdom) François Duret	De Cadenet LM	Ford Cosworth DFV 3.0 L V8		55	(United Kingdom) Mike Wilds	2
(United Kingdom) François Duret	De Cadenet LM	Ford Cosworth DFV 3.0 L V8		55	(United Kingdom) Ian Harrower	2
(West Germany) Kannacher GT-Racing	URD C81	BMW M88 3.5 L I6	D	56; 54	(West Germany) Anton Fischhaber	3, 7
(West Germany) Kannacher GT-Racing	URD C81	BMW M88 3.5 L I6	D	56; 54	(West Germany) Rolf Gätz	3
(West Germany) Kannacher GT-Racing	URD C81	BMW M88 3.5 L I6	D	56; 54	(West Germany) Peter Kroeber	3
(West Germany) Kannacher GT-Racing	URD C81	BMW M88 3.5 L I6	D	56; 54	(France) Bruno Sotty	4–6
(West Germany) Kannacher GT-Racing	URD C81	BMW M88 3.5 L I6	D	56; 54	(France) Gérard Cuynet	4–6
(West Germany) Kannacher GT-Racing	URD C81	BMW M88 3.5 L I6	D	56; 54	(France) Christian Baldino	4
(West Germany) Kannacher GT-Racing	URD C81	BMW M88 3.5 L I6	D	56; 54	(France) Valentin Bertapelle	5
(West Germany) Kannacher GT-Racing	URD C81	BMW M88 3.5 L I6	D	56; 54	(United Kingdom) Fraçois Duret	6
(West Germany) Kannacher GT-Racing	URD C81	BMW M88 3.5 L I6	D	56; 54	(West Germany) Harald Grohs	7–8
(West Germany) Kannacher GT-Racing	URD C81	BMW M88 3.5 L I6	D	56; 54	(United Kingdom) Gerry Amato	7
(West Germany) Kannacher GT-Racing	URD C81	BMW M88 3.5 L I6	D	56; 54	(Italy) Maurizio Micangeli	8
(West Germany) Kannacher GT-Racing	URD C83	Porsche Type-935 3.0 L Turbo Flat-6	D	57	(West Germany) Jürgen Kannacher	5
(West Germany) Kannacher GT-Racing	URD C83	Porsche Type-935 3.0 L Turbo Flat-6	D	57	(West Germany) Wolfgang Boller	5
(West Germany) Kannacher GT-Racing	URD C83	Porsche Type-935 3.0 L Turbo Flat-6	D	57	(Austria) Walter Lechner	5
(United Kingdom) Tiga Racing	Tiga GC83	Chevrolet 5.0 L V8	A	58; 17	(Australia) Neil Crang	6–8
(United Kingdom) Tiga Racing	Tiga GC83	Chevrolet 5.0 L V8	A	58; 17	(United Kingdom) Gordon Spice	6–8
(Italy) Maurizio Micangeli	De Tomaso Pantera C	Ford 5.7 L V8	D	21; 59	(Italy) Carlo Pietromarchi	1, 7–8
(Italy) Maurizio Micangeli	De Tomaso Pantera C	Ford 5.7 L V8	D	21; 59	(Italy) Maurizio Micangeli	1, 7
(Italy) Maurizio Micangeli	De Tomaso Pantera C	Ford 5.7 L V8	D	21; 59	(Italy) Marcello Gallo	7–8
(Italy) Maurizio Micangeli	De Tomaso Pantera C	Ford 5.7 L V8	D	21; 59	(Italy) "Spiffero"	8

=== Group C Junior ===
Entrant	Car	Engine	Tyre	No.	Drivers	Rounds
(Japan) Mazdaspeed	Mazda 717C	Mazda 13B 1.3 L 2-Rotor	D	60	(Japan) Yojiro Terada	2, 4
(Japan) Mazdaspeed	Mazda 717C	Mazda 13B 1.3 L 2-Rotor	D	60	(United Kingdom) Pete Lovett	2
(Japan) Mazdaspeed	Mazda 717C	Mazda 13B 1.3 L 2-Rotor	D	60	(Japan) Yoshimi Katayama	4
(Japan) Mazdaspeed	Mazda 717C	Mazda 13B 1.3 L 2-Rotor	D	60	(Japan) Takashi Yorino	4
(Japan) Mazdaspeed	Mazda 717C	Mazda 13B 1.3 L 2-Rotor	D	61	(United Kingdom) Jeff Allam	4
(Japan) Mazdaspeed	Mazda 717C	Mazda 13B 1.3 L 2-Rotor	D	61	(United Kingdom) Steve Soper	4
(Japan) Mazdaspeed	Mazda 717C	Mazda 13B 1.3 L 2-Rotor	D	61	(United Kingdom) James Weaver	4
(United Kingdom) Manns Racing	Harrier RX83C	Mazda 13B 1.3 L 2-Rotor	A	62; 51	(United Kingdom) Roy Baker	1–2, 4–6
(United Kingdom) Manns Racing	Harrier RX83C	Mazda 13B 1.3 L 2-Rotor	A	62; 51	(United Kingdom) Les Blackburn	1
(United Kingdom) Manns Racing	Harrier RX83C	Mazda 13B 1.3 L 2-Rotor	A	62; 51	(United Kingdom) David Palmer	2, 4–6
(United Kingdom) Manns Racing	Harrier RX83C	Mazda 13B 1.3 L 2-Rotor	A	62; 51	(United States) Pierre Honegger	4
(United Kingdom) Manns Racing	Harrier RX83C	Mazda 13B 1.3 L 2-Rotor	A	62; 51	(United Kingdom) Richard Down	6
(Italy) Jolly Club (Italy) Vesuvio Racing SRL	Alba AR2	Giannini 1.8 L Turbo I4	P	63	(Italy) Carlo Facetti	2–8
(Italy) Jolly Club (Italy) Vesuvio Racing SRL	Alba AR2	Giannini 1.8 L Turbo I4	P	63	(Italy) Martino Finotto	2–8
(Italy) Jolly Club (Italy) Vesuvio Racing SRL	Alba AR2	Giannini 1.8 L Turbo I4	P	63	(Switzerland) Marco Vanoli	4
(Italy) Jolly Club (Italy) Vesuvio Racing SRL	Alba AR2	Giannini 1.8 L Turbo I4	P	63	(Italy) Fulvio Ballabio	7
(Italy) Jolly Club (Italy) Vesuvio Racing SRL	Alba AR2	Giannini 1.8 L Turbo I4	P	63	(Italy) Guido Daccò	8
(Italy) Jolly Club (Italy) Vesuvio Racing SRL	Alba AR2	Giannini 1.8 L Turbo I4	P	65	(Italy) Fulvio Ballabio	7
(Italy) Jolly Club (Italy) Vesuvio Racing SRL	Alba AR2	Giannini 1.8 L Turbo I4	P	65	(Italy) Guido Daccò	7
(France) Hubert Striebig	Sthemo SM01	BMW M12 2.2 L I4		64	(France) Hubert Striebig	4, 7–8
(France) Hubert Striebig	Sthemo SM01	BMW M12 2.2 L I4		64	(France) Jacques Heuclin	4, 7–8
(France) Hubert Striebig	Sthemo SM01	BMW M12 2.2 L I4		64	(France) Noël del Bello	4
(United Kingdom) François Duret	De Cadenet LM	Ford Cosworth DFV 3.0 L V8		65	(United Kingdom) François Duret	4
(United Kingdom) François Duret	De Cadenet LM	Ford Cosworth DFV 3.0 L V8		65	(United Kingdom) John Sheldon	4
(United Kingdom) François Duret	De Cadenet LM	Ford Cosworth DFV 3.0 L V8		65	(United Kingdom) Ian Harrower	4

=== Group B ===
The Nürburgring round allowed additional Group B entries meeting the under 2,000 cc (120 cu in) regulations to compete but they were not eligible for championship points and are therefore not listed here.

Entrant	Car	Engine	Tyre	No.	Drivers	Rounds
(West Germany) Bernd Schiller	Porsche 930	Porsche 3.3 L Turbo Flat-6	M	81; 98; 94	(West Germany) Bernd Schiller	1–2, 4
(West Germany) Bernd Schiller	Porsche 930	Porsche 3.3 L Turbo Flat-6	M	81; 98; 94	(West Germany) Günter Steckkönig	1–2, 4
(West Germany) Bernd Schiller	Porsche 930	Porsche 3.3 L Turbo Flat-6	M	81; 98; 94	(Switzerland) Claude Haldi	4
(Denmark) Jens Winther Team Castrol	BMW M1	BMW M88 3.5 L I6	D A	82; 89; 103	(Denmark) Jens Winther	All
(Denmark) Jens Winther Team Castrol	BMW M1	BMW M88 3.5 L I6	D A	82; 89; 103	(West Germany) Wolfgang Braun	1–3, 5
(Denmark) Jens Winther Team Castrol	BMW M1	BMW M88 3.5 L I6	D A	82; 89; 103	(United Kingdom) David Mercer	2, 5–8
(Denmark) Jens Winther Team Castrol	BMW M1	BMW M88 3.5 L I6	D A	82; 89; 103	(West Germany) Frank Jelinski	3, 6
(Denmark) Jens Winther Team Castrol	BMW M1	BMW M88 3.5 L I6	D A	82; 89; 103	(Switzerland) Angelo Pallavinci	4
(Denmark) Jens Winther Team Castrol	BMW M1	BMW M88 3.5 L I6	D A	82; 89; 103	(West Germany) Leopold von Bayern	4
(Denmark) Jens Winther Team Castrol	BMW M1	BMW M88 3.5 L I6	D A	82; 89; 103	(Denmark) Lars-Viggo Jensen	8
(West Germany) Georg Memminger	Porsche 930	Porsche 3.3 L Turbo Flat-6	D	83; 92; 110	(West Germany) Georg Memminger	1–5, 7–8
(West Germany) Georg Memminger	Porsche 930	Porsche 3.3 L Turbo Flat-6	D	83; 92; 110	(West Germany) Heinz Kunh-Weiss	1–5, 7–8
(West Germany) Georg Memminger	Porsche 930	Porsche 3.3 L Turbo Flat-6	D	83; 92; 110	(West Germany) Günter Steckkönig	3
(West Germany) Georg Memminger	Porsche 930	Porsche 3.3 L Turbo Flat-6	D	83; 92; 110	(West Germany) Fritz Müller	4
(Italy) Giuseppe Arlotti	Porsche 930	Porsche 3.3 L Turbo Flat-6		84	(Italy) Luigi Colzani	1
(Italy) Giuseppe Arlotti	Porsche 930	Porsche 3.3 L Turbo Flat-6		84	(Italy) Bruno Rebai	1
(France) Equipe Alméras Frères	Porsche 930	Porsche 3.3 L Turbo Flat-6	M	85; 95	(France) Jean-Marie Alméras	1–2, 4
(France) Equipe Alméras Frères	Porsche 930	Porsche 3.3 L Turbo Flat-6	M	85; 95	(France) Jacques Guillot	1–2, 4
(France) Equipe Alméras Frères	Porsche 930	Porsche 3.3 L Turbo Flat-6	M	85; 95	(France) Roland Biancone	1–2
(France) Equipe Alméras Frères	Porsche 930	Porsche 3.3 L Turbo Flat-6	M	85; 95	(France) Jacques Alméras	4
(West Germany) Racing Team Jürgensen GmbH	BMW M1	BMW M88 3.5 L I4	D	88; 105; 90	(West Germany) Hans Christian Jürgensen	1–3, 5–8
(West Germany) Racing Team Jürgensen GmbH	BMW M1	BMW M88 3.5 L I4	D	88; 105; 90	(West Germany) Edgar Dören	1–3, 5–8
(West Germany) Racing Team Jürgensen GmbH	BMW M1	BMW M88 3.5 L I4	D	88; 105; 90	(Italy) Antoniella Mandelli	2
(West Germany) Racing Team Jürgensen GmbH	BMW M1	BMW M88 3.5 L I4	D	88; 105; 90	(United Kingdom) Vic Elford	3
(West Germany) Racing Team Jürgensen GmbH	BMW M1	BMW M88 3.5 L I4	D	88; 105; 90	(West Germany) Helmut Gall	5–8
(West Germany) Racing Team Jürgensen GmbH	Porsche 930	Porsche 3.3 L Turbo Flat-6	D	91; 106	(West Germany) Helmut Gall	2–3, 6–8
(West Germany) Racing Team Jürgensen GmbH	Porsche 930	Porsche 3.3 L Turbo Flat-6	D	91; 106	(United States) Margie Smith-Haas	2
(West Germany) Racing Team Jürgensen GmbH	Porsche 930	Porsche 3.3 L Turbo Flat-6	D	91; 106	(West Germany) Jürgen Hamelmann	3, 5
(West Germany) Racing Team Jürgensen GmbH	Porsche 930	Porsche 3.3 L Turbo Flat-6	D	91; 106	(West Germany) Edgar Dören	3, 7
(West Germany) Racing Team Jürgensen GmbH	Porsche 930	Porsche 3.3 L Turbo Flat-6	D	91; 106	(France) Alexandre Yvon	4–6
(West Germany) Racing Team Jürgensen GmbH	Porsche 930	Porsche 3.3 L Turbo Flat-6	D	91; 106	(France) Jean-Marie Lemerle	4
(West Germany) Racing Team Jürgensen GmbH	Porsche 930	Porsche 3.3 L Turbo Flat-6	D	91; 106	(West Germany) Michael Krankenberg	4
(West Germany) Racing Team Jürgensen GmbH	Porsche 930	Porsche 3.3 L Turbo Flat-6	D	91; 106	(United Kingdom) Gerry Amato	6
(West Germany) Racing Team Jürgensen GmbH	Porsche 930	Porsche 3.3 L Turbo Flat-6	D	91; 106	(West Germany) Walter Mertes	7–8
(West Germany) Racing Team Jürgensen GmbH	Porsche 930	Porsche 3.3 L Turbo Flat-6	D	91; 106	(United Kingdom) Dudley Wood	8
(United Kingdom) Charles Ivey Racing	Porsche 930	Porsche 3.3 L Turbo Flat-6	D A	93	(United Kingdom) Paul Smith	2, 4–8
(United Kingdom) Charles Ivey Racing	Porsche 930	Porsche 3.3 L Turbo Flat-6	D A	93	(United Kingdom) David Ovey	2, 4–6, 8
(United Kingdom) Charles Ivey Racing	Porsche 930	Porsche 3.3 L Turbo Flat-6	D A	93	(United Kingdom) John Cooper	2, 4–5
(United Kingdom) Charles Ivey Racing	Porsche 930	Porsche 3.3 L Turbo Flat-6	D A	93	(United States) Margie Smith-Haas	6, 8
(United Kingdom) Charles Ivey Racing	Porsche 930	Porsche 3.3 L Turbo Flat-6	D A	93	(Brazil) Roberto Moreno	7
(United Kingdom) Charles Ivey Racing	Porsche 930	Porsche 3.3 L Turbo Flat-6	D A	93	(South Africa) Giorgio Cavalieri	7
(France) Michel Lateste	Porsche 930	Porsche 3.3 L Turbo Flat-6	M	96	(France) Michel Lateste	4–5, 8
(France) Michel Lateste	Porsche 930	Porsche 3.3 L Turbo Flat-6	M	96	(France) Michel Bienvault	4–5, 8
(France) Michel Lateste	Porsche 930	Porsche 3.3 L Turbo Flat-6	M	96	(France) Raymond Touroul	4, 8
(France) Raymond Boutinnaud	Porsche 928S	Porsche 4.7 L V8	D	97	(France) Raymond Boutinnaud	4
(France) Raymond Boutinnaud	Porsche 928S	Porsche 4.7 L V8	D	97	(France) Patrick Gonin	4
(France) Raymond Boutinnaud	Porsche 928S	Porsche 4.7 L V8	D	97	(France) Alain Le Page	4
(Belgium) EBRT	Porsche 930	Porsche 3.3 L Turbo Flat-6		98	(West Germany) Peter Reuter	5
(Belgium) EBRT	Porsche 930	Porsche 3.3 L Turbo Flat-6		98	(West Germany) Bruno Beilcke	5
(Belgium) EBRT	Porsche 930	Porsche 3.3 L Turbo Flat-6		98	(Belgium) Anton Hüweller	5
(Switzerland) Hobby Rallye	Porsche 930	Porsche 3.3 L Turbo Flat-6		98	(Switzerland) Mario Regusci	7
(Switzerland) Hobby Rallye	Porsche 930	Porsche 3.3 L Turbo Flat-6		98	(Switzerland) Olindo Del-Thė	7
(Belgium) Maurice Dantinne	Ferrari 308 GTB LM	Ferrari 3.0 L V8		99	(Belgium) Maurice Dantinne	5
(Belgium) Maurice Dantinne	Ferrari 308 GTB LM	Ferrari 3.0 L V8		99	(Belgium) Pierre Vaillant	5
(Sweden) Strandell	Porsche 930	Porsche 3.3 L Turbo Flat-6	A	99	(Sweden) Kenneth Leim	8
(Sweden) Strandell	Porsche 930	Porsche 3.3 L Turbo Flat-6	A	99	(Sweden) Tomas Kaiser	8
(Switzerland) Brun Motorsport GmbH	BMW M1	BMW M88 3.5 L I6		101	(West Germany) Harald Grohs	3
(Switzerland) Brun Motorsport GmbH	BMW M1	BMW M88 3.5 L I6		101	(West Germany) Leopold von Bayern	3
(West Germany) Peter Reuter	Porsche 930	Porsche 3.3 L Turbo Flat-6		108	(West Germany) Peter Reuter	3
(West Germany) Peter Reuter	Porsche 930	Porsche 3.3 L Turbo Flat-6		108	(West Germany) Franz-Richard Friebel	3
(West Germany) Peter Reuter	Porsche 930	Porsche 3.3 L Turbo Flat-6		108	(West Germany) Hermann-Peter Duge	3
(West Germany) Bergischer M.C. Wuppertal	Porsche 924 Carrera GTS	Porsche 2.0 L Turbo I4		109	(West Germany) Wolf-Georg van Staerh	3
(West Germany) Bergischer M.C. Wuppertal	Porsche 924 Carrera GTS	Porsche 2.0 L Turbo I4		109	(West Germany) Ulli Richter	3
(West Germany) Helge Probst	Porsche 928S	Porsche 4.7 L V8		111; 97	(West Germany) Helge Probst	3, 5
(West Germany) Helge Probst	Porsche 928S	Porsche 4.7 L V8		111; 97	(West Germany) Norbert Haug	3, 5
(West Germany) Helge Probst	Porsche 928S	Porsche 4.7 L V8		111; 97	(West Germany) Wolfgang Walter	3
(West Germany) Helge Probst	Porsche 928S	Porsche 4.7 L V8		111; 97	(West Germany) Knuth Mentel	5
(West Germany) Mich Opel Tuning	Opel Ascona 400	Opel 2.4 L I4		112	(West Germany) Karl-Heinz Schäfer	3
(West Germany) Mich Opel Tuning	Opel Ascona 400	Opel 2.4 L I4		112	(West Germany) Karl-Heinz Gürthler	3
(West Germany) Autax Motor+Sport	Porsche 924 Carrera GTS	Porsche 2.0 L Turbo I4		113	(West Germany) Klaus Utz	3
(West Germany) Autax Motor+Sport	Porsche 924 Carrera GTS	Porsche 2.0 L Turbo I4		113	(Switzerland) Claude Haldi	3

== Results and standings ==
=== Race results ===
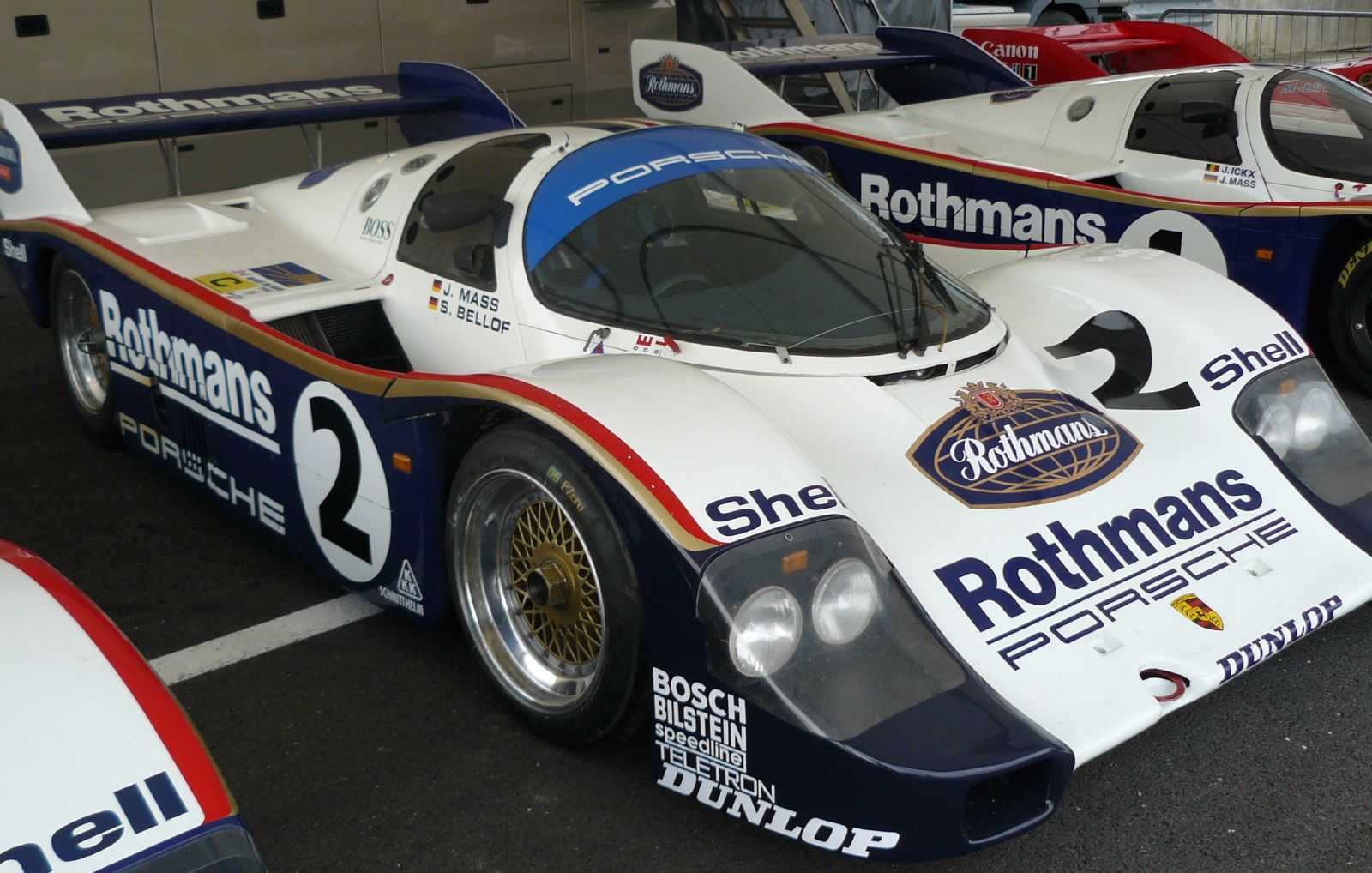
Rothmans Porsche won five of the eight races, including the 24 Hours of Le Mans, with the Porsche 956

Rnd	Circuit	Outright winning team	Group C Junior winning team	Group B winning team	Reports
Rnd	Circuit	Outright winning drivers	Group C Junior winning drivers	Group B winning drivers	Reports
1	Monza	(West Germany) No. 11 Sorga S.A	No finishers	(West Germany) No. 88 Racing Team Jürgensen GmbH	Report
1	Monza	(France) Bob Wollek (Belgium) Thierry Boutsen	No finishers	(West Germany) Hans Christian Jürgensen (West Germany) Edgar Dören	Report
2	Silverstone	(West Germany) No. 2 Rothmans Porsche	(Italy) No. 63 Jolly Club	(United Kingdom) No. 89 Jens Winther Team Castrol	Report
2	Silverstone	(United Kingdom) Derek Bell (West Germany) Stefan Bellof	(Italy) Carlo Facetti (Italy) Martino Finotto	(Denmark) Jens Winther (West Germany) Wolfgang Braun (United Kingdom) David Mercer	Report
3	Nürburgring	(West Germany) No. 1 Rothmans Porsche	(Italy) No. 63 Jolly Club	(West Germany) No. 106 Racing Team Jürgensen GmbH	Report
3	Nürburgring	(West Germany) Jochen Mass (Belgium) Jacky Ickx	(Italy) Carlo Facetti (Italy) Martino Finotto	(West Germany) Edgar Dören (West Germany) Helmut Gall (West Germany) Jürgen Hamelmann	Report
4	Le Mans	(West Germany) No. 3 Rothmans Porsche	(Japan) No. 60 Mazdaspeed	(United Kingdom) No. 93 Charles Ivey Racing	Report
4	Le Mans	(Australia) Vern Schuppan (United States) Al Holbert (United States) Hurley Haywood	(Japan) Yojiro Terada (Japan) Takashi Yorino (Japan) Yoshimi Katayama	(United Kingdom) John Cooper (United Kingdom) Paul Smith (United Kingdom) David Ovey	Report
5	Spa-Francorchamps	(West Germany) No. 1 Rothmans Porsche	(United Kingdom) No. 62 Manns Racing	(Denmark) No. 89 Jens Winther Team Castrol	Report
5	Spa-Francorchamps	(West Germany) Jochen Mass (Belgium) Jacky Ickx	(United Kingdom) Roy Baker (United Kingdom) David Palmer	(Denmark) Jens Winther (West Germany) Frank Jelinski (United Kingdom) David Mercer	Report
6	Brands Hatch	(United Kingdom) No. 11 John Fitzpatrick Racing	(Italy) No. 63 Vesuvio Racing SRL	(Denmark) No. 89 Jens Winther Team Castrol	Report
6	Brands Hatch	(United Kingdom) John Fitzpatrick (United Kingdom) Derek Warwick	(Italy) Carlo Facetti (Italy) Martino Finotto	(Denmark) Jens Winther (West Germany) Frank Jelinski (United Kingdom) David Mercer	Report
7	Imola	(Italy) No. 4 Martini Racing	No finishers	(West Germany) No. 90 Racing Team Jürgensen GmbH	Report
7	Imola	(Italy) Teo Fabi (West Germany) Hans Heyer	No finishers	(West Germany) Hans Christian Jürgensen (West Germany) Edgar Dören (West Germany) Helmut Gall	Report
8	Mugello	(West Germany) No. 8 Sorga S.A.	No finishers	(Denmark) No. 89 Jens Winther Team Castol	Report
8	Mugello	(France) Bob Wollek (Sweden) Stefan Johansson	No finishers	(Denmark) Jens Winther (Denmark) Lars-Viggo Jensen (United Kingdom) David Mercer	Report

=== Drivers' championship ===
Drivers were awarded points for finishes in the top ten positions in each overall race classification. All three classes competed for the same points in overall classification, but Group C Junior and Group B competitors were awarded additional points for any finish in the overall top ten.

Points system
1st	2nd	3rd	4th	5th	6th	7th	8th	9th	10th	Group C Junior Bonus	Group B Bonus
20	15	12	10	8	6	4	3	2	1	2	3

Pos.	Driver	Team	MON (Italy)	SIL (United Kingdom)	NUR (West Germany)	LMS (France)	SPA (Belgium)	BRH (United Kingdom)	IMO (Italy)	MUG (Italy)	Total points
1	(France) Bob Wollek	(West Germany) Sorga S.A.	1	2	2	6	Ret	6	3	1	94
2	(United Kingdom) Derek Bell	(West Germany) Rothmans Porsche	7	1	Ret	2	2	3			88
2	(United Kingdom) Derek Bell	(United Kingdom) Canon Racing							4	3	88
3	(Belgium) Jacky Ickx	(West Germany) Rothmans Porsche	2	Ret	1	2	1	2			85
4	(Sweden) Stefan Johansson	(West Germany) Sorga S.A.		2	2	6	Ret	6	3	1	74
4	(United Kingdom) John Fitzpatrick	(United Kingdom) John Fitzpatrick Racing	5	8	6	5	3	1	2	4	74
6	(West Germany) Jochen Mass	(West Germany) Rothmans Porsche	2	Ret	1	Ret	1	2			70
7	(West Germany) Jürgen Lässig	(West Germany) Boss-Obermaier Racing	4	4	4	7	5	5	5	5	66
7	(West Germany) Axel Plankenhorn	(West Germany) Boss-Obermaier Racing	4	4	4	7	5	5	5	5	66
9	(United Kingdom) David Hobbs	(United Kingdom) John Fitzpatrick Racing	5	8	6	Ret	3		2	4	54
10	(West Germany) Stefan Bellof	(West Germany) Rothmans Porsche		1	Ret	Ret	2	3			47
11	(West Germany) Hans Heyer	(West Germany) Sorga S.A.	3	Ret			Ret	7			46
11	(West Germany) Hans Heyer	(West Germany) Boss-Obermaier Racing			4						46
11	(West Germany) Hans Heyer	(Italy) Martini Racing				Ret			1	Ret	46
12	(Belgium) Thierry Boutsen	(West Germany) Sorga S.A.	1								44
12	(Belgium) Thierry Boutsen	(United Kingdom) Canon Racing		3			9				44
12	(Belgium) Thierry Boutsen	Ford France				Ret					44
12	(Belgium) Thierry Boutsen	(United Kingdom) John Fitzpatrick Racing								4	44
13	(United Kingdom) Jonathan Palmer	(United Kingdom) Canon Racing			3	8		9	4	3	39
14	(Netherlands) Jan Lammers	(United Kingdom) Canon Racing	6	3	3	8	9	9			37
15	(Belgium) Hervé Regout	(West Germany) Boss-Obermaier Racing					5	5	5	5	32
16	(Italy) Riccardo Patrese	(Italy) Martini Racing	9	Ret	Ret		7	4		2	31
17	(Australia) Vern Schuppan	(West Germany) Porsche Kremer Racing		5							28
17	(Australia) Vern Schuppan	(West Germany) Rothmans Porsche				1					28
18	(West Germany) Volkert Merl	(West Germany) Sorga S.A.		Ret		4	Ret	7	6	6	26
19	(United States) Al Holbert	(West Germany) Rothmans Porsche	7			1					24
19	(Italy) Teo Fabi	(Italy) Martini Racing	Ret	Ret		Ret	7		1		24
21	(West Germany) Clemens Schickentanz	(West Germany) Sorga S.A.	3	Ret		4					22
22	(United Kingdom) Derek Warwick	(West Germany) Porsche Kremer Racing				Ret	Ret				20
22	(United Kingdom) Derek Warwick	(United Kingdom) John Fitzpatrick Racing						1			20
22	(United States) Hurley Haywood	(West Germany) Rothmans Porsche				1					20
22	(West Germany) Harold Grohs	(West Germany) Boss-Obermaier Racing		4							20
22	(West Germany) Harold Grohs	(Switzerland) Brun Motorsport GmbH			Ret	DNS	4				20
22	(West Germany) Harold Grohs	(West Germany) Kannacher GT-Racing							DSQ	Ret	20
25	(West Germany) Deiter Schornstein	(West Germany) Sorga S.A.					8	7	6	6	19
26	(Italy) Alessandro Nannini	(Italy) Martini Racing				Ret		Ret	DSQ	2	15
26	(Argentina) Oscar Larrauri	(Italy) Sivama/Grifone		Ret	5	NC			8	7	15
28	(West Germany) Rolf Stommelen	(West Germany) Sorga S.A.	3								12
28	(Finland) Keke Rosberg	(United Kingdom) Canon Racing			3						12
28	(France) Philippe Alliot	(West Germany) Porsche Kremer Racing				3					12
28	(United States) Mario Andretti	(West Germany) Porsche Kremer Racing				3					12
28	(United States) Michael Andretti	(West Germany) Porsche Kremer Racing				3					12
28	(Italy) Michele Alboreto	(Italy) Martini Racing	9	Ret	Ret	Ret	11	4			12
34	(West Germany) Edgar Dören	(West Germany) Racing Team Jürgensen GmbH	10	11	7		15	Ret	10	12	11
35	(West Germany) Jürgen Barth	(West Germany) Boss-Obermaier Racing	4								10
35	(Colombia) Mauricio DeNervaez	(West Germany) Sorga S.A.				4					10
35	(Switzerland) Walter Brun	(Switzerland) Brun Motorsport GmbH		Ret	Ret	DNS	4				10
35	(West Germany) Hans-Joachim Stuck	(Switzerland) Brun Motorsport GmbH		Ret	Ret	DNS	4				10
39	(United Kingdom) Richard Lloyd	(United Kingdom) Canon Racing	6	DNS		8		DNS			9
40	(Australia) Alan Jones	(West Germany) Porsche Kremer Racing		5							8
40	(Italy) Massimo Sigala	(Italy) Sivama/Grifone		Ret	5	NC					8
40	(United Kingdom) Guy Edwards	(United Kingdom) John Fitzpatrick Racing		Ret		5					8
40	(United Kingdom) Rupert Keegan	(United Kingdom) John Fitzpatrick Racing		Ret		5					8
40	(West Germany) Hans Christian Jürgensen	(West Germany) Racing Team Jürgensen GmbH	10	11	DNS		Ret	Ret	10	12	8
45	(West Germany) Helmut Gall	(West Germany) Racing Team Jürgensen GmbH		DNS	7		Ret	Ret	10	12	7
45	(West Germany) Jürgen Hamelmann	(West Germany) Racing Team Jürgensen GmbH			7		15				7
45	(Italy) "Gimax"	(Italy) Sivama/Giafone							8	7	7
45	(Italy) Carlo Facetti	(Italy) Jolly Club		9	11	Ret	Ret	10	Ret	Ret	7
45	(Italy) Martino Finotto	(Italy) Jolly Club		9	11	Ret	Ret	10	Ret	Ret	7
50	(United Kingdom) Tiff Needell	(United Kingdom) Canon Racing	6								6
50	(United Kingdom) Tiff Needell	(United Kingdom) EMKA Productions Ltd.		Ret		17					6
50	(United Kingdom) Richard Cleare	(United Kingdom) Richard Cleare Racing	Ret	6		Ret		Ret			6
50	(United Kingdom) Tony Dron	(United Kingdom) Richard Cleare Racing	Ret	6		Ret		Ret			6
50	(Italy) Paolo Barilla	(Italy) Euro TV-Mirabella Racing			Ret		6	Ret	Ret	Ret	6
50	(Italy) Paolo Barilla	(Italy) Martini Racing				Ret					6
50	(Italy) Giorgio Francia	(Italy) Euro TV-Mirabella Racing			Ret		6	Ret	Ret	Ret	6
50	(Italy) Gianpiero Moretti	(West Germany) Sorga S.A.								6	6
50	(Switzerland) Claude Haldi	(West Germany) Autax Motor+Sport			8						6
50	(Switzerland) Claude Haldi	(West Germany) Bernd Schiller				Ret					6
50	(West Germany) Klaus Utz	(West Germany) Autax Motor+Sport			8						6
58	(Switzerland) Loris Kessel	(Switzerland) Cheetah Car					Ret		9	8	5
58	(France) Laurent Ferrier	(Switzerland) Cheetah Car					Ret		9	8	5
60	(United Kingdom) Ray Mallock	(United Kingdom) Viscount Downe with Pace Petroleum		7		Ret		Ret			4
60	(United Kingdom) Mike Salmon	(United Kingdom) Viscount Downe with Pace Petroleum		7		Ret		Ret			4
60	(South Africa) Desiré Wilson	(West Germany) Boss-Obermaier Racing				7					4
60	(Australia) Neil Crang	(United Kingdom) Tiga Racing						14	7	Ret	4
60	(United Kingdom) Gordon Spice	(United Kingdom) Tiga Racing						14	7	Ret	4
60	(Denmark) Jens Winther	(Denmark) Jens Winther Team Castrol	11	10	Ret	Ret	12	11	Ret	11	4
60	(West Germany) Wolfgang Braun	(Denmark) Jens Winther Team Castrol	11	10	Ret		12				4
60	(United Kingdom) David Mercer	(Denmark) Jens Winther Team Castrol		10			12	11	Ret	11	4
60	(West Germany) Georg Memminger	(West Germany) Georg Memminger	12	14	10	13	Ret		11	15	4
60	(West Germany) Heinz Kunh-Weiss	(West Germany) Georg Memminger	12	14	10	13	Ret		11	15	4
60	(West Germany) Günter Steckkönig	(West Germany) Bernd Schiller	Ret	15		Ret					4
60	(West Germany) Günter Steckkönig	(West Germany) Georg Memminger			10						4
71	(Italy) Duilio Truffo	(Italy) Sivama/Grifone	8	Ret							3
71	(Italy) Roberto Sigala	(Italy) Sivama/Grifone	8								3
71	(Belgium) Jean-Michel Martin	(West Germany) Joest Racing		Ret		Ret	8				3
71	(West Germany) "John Winter"	(West Germany) Joest Racing		Ret		Ret	8				3
71	(United Kingdom) Dudley Wood	(United Kingdom) Grid Motor Racing Ltd.				Ret		8			3
71	(United Kingdom) Dudley Wood	(West Germany) Racing Team Jürgensen GmbH								Ret	3
71	(United States) Skeeter McKitterick	(United Kingdom) Grid Motor Racing Ltd.						8			3
71	(Spain) Emilio de Villota	(United Kingdom) Grid Motor Racing Ltd.						8			3
78	(United States) Tony Garcia	Sauber Racing Switzerland				9					2
78	(United States) Albert Naon	Sauber Racing Switzerland				9					2
78	(Colombia) Diego Montoya	Sauber Racing Switzerland				9					2
78	(Switzerland) Rolf Biland	(Switzerland) Cheetah Car							9		2
78	(Italy) Mario Caliceti	(Italy) Sivama/Grifone								9	2
78	(Italy) Odoardo Covoni	(Italy) Sivama/Grifone								9	2
84	(France) Jean-Louis Schlesser	(United States) Henn's T-Bird Swap Shop				10					1
84	(France) Claude Ballot-Léna	(United States) Henn's T-Bird Swap Shop				10					1
84	(France) Bruno Sotty	(West Germany) Kannacher GT-Racing				14	10	Ret			1
84	(France) Gérard Cuynet	(West Germany) Kannacher GT-Racing				14	10	Ret			1
84	(France) Valentin Bertapelle	(West Germany) Kannacher GT-Racing					10				1
84	(France) Yves Courage	(France) Yves Courage				Ret				10	1
84	(Italy) Aldo Bertuzzi	(France) Yves Courage								10	1
84	(Italy) Gianni Giudici	(France) Yves Courage								10	1
Pos.	Driver	Team	MON (Italy)	SIL (United Kingdom)	NUR (West Germany)	LMS (France)	SPA (Belgium)	BRH (United Kingdom)	IMO (Italy)	MUG (Italy)	Total points

Colour	Result
Gold	Winner
Silver	Second place
Bronze	Third place
Green	Points classification
Blue	Non-points classification
Blue	Non-classified finish (NC)
Purple	Retired, not classified (Ret)
Red	Did not qualify (DNQ)
Red	Did not pre-qualify (DNPQ)
Black	Disqualified (DSQ)
White	Did not start (DNS)
White	Withdrew (WD)
White	Race cancelled (C)
Blank	Did not practice (DNP)
Blank	Did not arrive (DNA)
Blank	Excluded (EX)
