= EMKA Aston Martin =

Racing car

EMKA C83/1
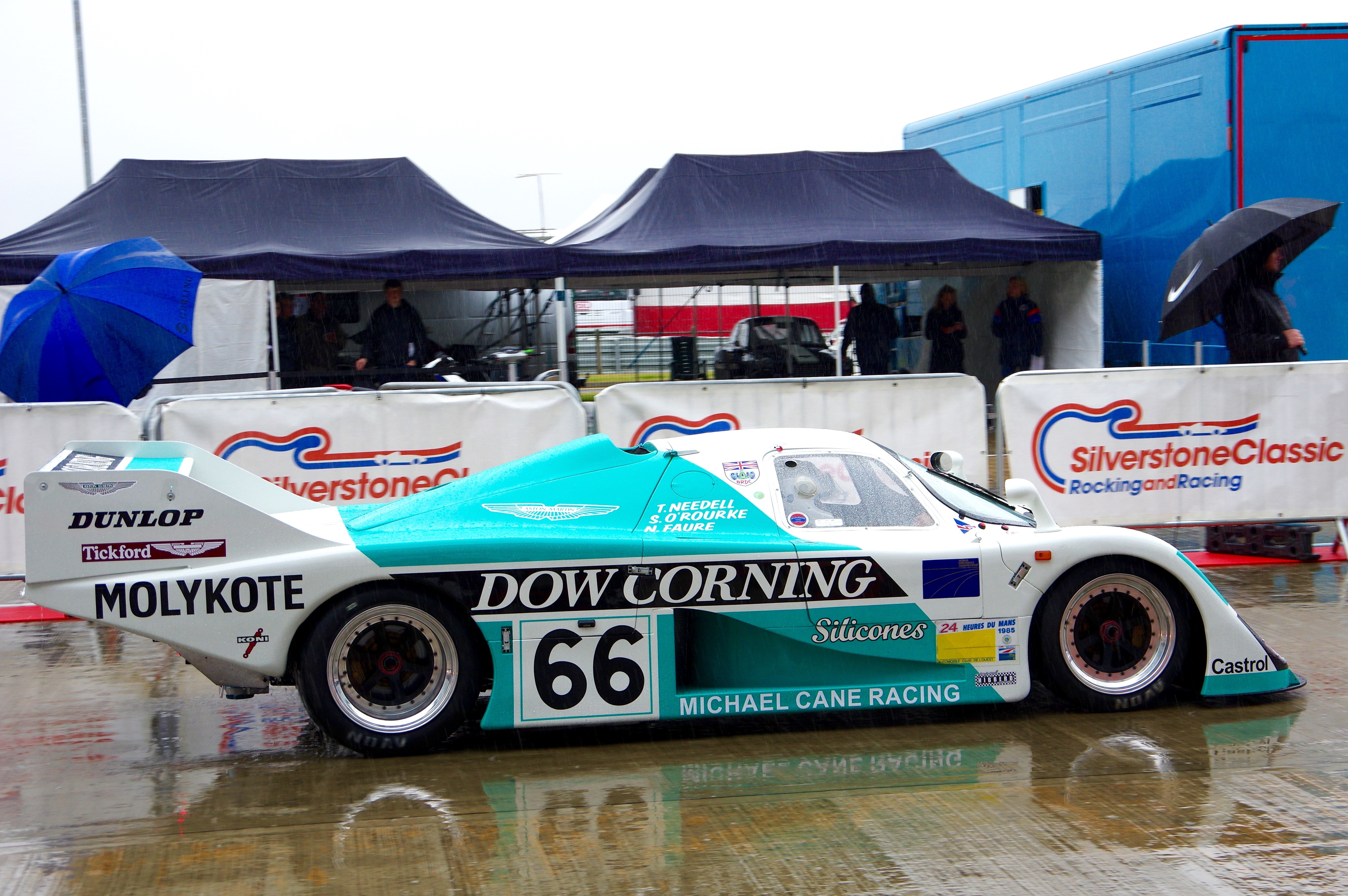
- 1983 EMKA 84C/1
- Category: Group C sports prototype
- Constructor: Michael Cane Racing; Maurice Gomm (chassis); Protoco (body)
- Designer: Len Bailey

Technical specifications
- Chassis: Aluminium monocoque with a Fibre glass body
- Suspension (front): Independent, Unequal wishboned and adjustable dampers
- Suspension (rear): Lower wishbones with an upper fully adjustable A-bracket
- Length: 15 ft 9 in (4,800 mm)
- Width: 6 ft 4 1/2 in (1,943 mm)
- Height: 3 ft 3 1/2 in (1,003 mm)
- Engine: Aston Martin Tickford DP1229 5,340cc alloy V8, DOHC per bank, 570 bhp @ 7000 rpm, 220 mph (350 km/h), RMR layout
- Transmission: Hewland VG 5-speed Manual
- Weight: 1,960 lb (890 kg)
- Tyres: Dunlop

Competition history
- Notable entrants: (United Kingdom) Michael Cane Racing (United Kingdom) EMKA Racing
- Notable drivers: (United Kingdom) Steve O'Rourke (United Kingdom) Tiff Needell (United Kingdom) Nick Faure
- Debut: 1983 1000 km of Silverstone

The EMKA Aston Martin was a Group C racing car built for EMKA Production's owner Steve O'Rourke by Michael Cane Racing and powered by an Aston Martin engine. The EMKA C83/1 was initially introduced in 1983 and competed in the 1983 24 Hours of Le Mans, finishing 17th overall. The car was modified for 1985 and raced at the 1985 24 Hours of Le Mans, finishing in 11th place after briefly leading the race in the opening hours.

The EMKA Aston Martin failed to finish any of the other races it appeared at in 1985, and Steve O'Rourke of EMKA Racing decided to take a break from international motorsport.

== Development ==
EMKA Aston Martin was designed by Len Bailey for the manager of the Pink Floyd, Steve O'Rourke. It was named after Steve O'Rourke's company EMKA Productions Ltd. The car was built by Michael Cane Racing. The monocoque was built by Maurice Gomm and the fibre glass body constructed by Protoco. The car was powered by an Aston Martin Tickford 5,340 cc V8 engine, which was redesigned by Bailey. It featured a relocated alternator, distributor and water pumps to allow for large ground effect tunnels to be used.

== Racing history ==
=== 1983 ===
EMKA C83/1 debuted at the 1983 Silverstone 1000 km race, with drivers Tiff Needell, Jeff Allam and Steve O'Rourke. The car failed to finish the race, retiring on the last lap due to a failed rear wheel bearing. The car next appeared at 1983 24 Hours of Le Mans with drivers Needell, O'Rourke and Nick Faure. Despite losing 2 hours due to a suspension problem, the car finished 17th overall and received the 'Motor' Trophy for being the first British car home.

=== 1984 ===
The car did not race in 1984.

=== 1985 ===
In 1985 Michael Cane Racing carried out extensive modifications to the car with design work being done by Richard Owen. The car now featured a revised rear suspension, a new bodywork and the removal of the ground effect. The car debuted at the 1985 1000 km of Silverstone race with drivers Tiff Needell, Steve O'Rourke and Bob Evans. The car qualified almost four seconds faster than it had done in 1983, but they did not finish the race.

The EMKA's most successful appearance was at the 1985 24 Hours of Le Mans. With drivers Needell, Nick Faure and O'Rourke the car lead the race for nine minutes during the opening hours and finished 11th overall. Again being the first British car across the line.

The EMKA Aston Martin failed to finish both the 1985 Spa and Brands Hatch 1000 km races. Steve O'Rourke decided to take a break from international motorsport, not returning until 1993 in the British GT Championship.

== Chassis ==
- EMKA C83/1 competed 1983
  - 1983 Silverstone 1000 km- ret
  - 1983 Le Mans 24 Hour- 17th
- EMKA C84/1 competed 1985
  - 1985 Silverstone 1000 km- ret
  - 1985 Le Mans 24 Hour- 11th
  - 1985 Spa 1000 km- ret
  - 1985 Brands Hatch 1000 km- ret

== Bibliography ==
- Paul Chudecki (1990). Aston Martin V8 Race Cars. Osprey Publishing. ISBN 0850459737.

== See also ==
- Nimrod NRA/C2
- Aston Martin AMR1
- Aston Martin RHAM/1
