= Nick Faure =

- Nationality: English
- Born: 28 May 1944 (age 82)
- Retired: 1989

Nick Faure (born 28 May 1944) is an English former sportscar racing driver, and purveyor of Porsche in the United Kingdom of his era. Known affectionately as Mr. Porsche, Faure achieved fame through racing and selling Porsche 911 and 356s, since the 1960s and his name has become synonymous with the marque. His fame allowed him the opportunity to race at Le Mans 24 Hours eleven times. He retired from international motor sport after the 1989 Spa 24 Hours.

== Career ==
In 1967 and 1968, Faure raced the ex-works 911, that Vic Elford had raced for Porsche GB. In 1969, Faure moved into British Saloon Car Championship, with the support of Porsche Cars GB, racing for the Demetriou Group. During the season, he achieved three fourth place finishes at Silverstone, Snetterton and Crystal Palace. This resulted in 16th place in the overall championship standings (fourth in class) For the next three seasons, Faure had step away from the International scene and raced nationally. In 1973, he was invited by Porsche to drive their brand new Carrera RS 2.7 lightweight in the British Production Sports Car Championship. He then moved on to the RS 3.0 version for the following season, still under Porsche Cars GB banner.

1974 also saw Faure receive an invitation to drive a Carrera 3.0 RSR for Ecurie Francorchamps, in the British Airways 1000km, at Brands Hatch. Although, due to gearbox problems, the car did not finish the race, this led to him to this first appearance in the Le Mans 24 hours. He helped steer the Carrera 3.0 RSR of ”Beurlys” to sixth overall, in his attempt in 1975. This would remain Faure’s best result, as he would never again finish inside the top-ten. The 1977 Rivet Supply 6 Hours race at Brands Hatch, would see Faure’s best result in a World Sportscar race, when partnered by Bob Wollek, he finished fourth overall in a Porsche Kremer Racing 935.

Faure would continue to race annually at Le Mans until 1985, taking in some other Word Sportscar race, mainly in England without much success. After finishing 36th in the 1989 24 Heures de Francorchamps - Lotto Trophy, he would retire from International Motor Sport.

=== Away from the track ===
Faure became associated with Porsche through his experience driving a wide range of the company's competition cars. Since the mid-1980s, he has operated a Porsche specialist business in Surrey, England, focusing on Porsche 911 and 356 models. He became known for his driving style in Porsche 911s, particularly his use of "hands off" opposite-lock cornering techniques that demonstrated the car's self-centering characteristics. Drawing on his experience with the marque, he later specialized in sourcing and supplying selected classic Porsche models.

== Racing record ==
=== Career highlights ===
Season	Series	Position	Team	Car
1969	British Saloon Car Championship	16th	Demetriou Group	Porsche 911
1981	World Endurance Championship for drivers	293rd	Dorset Racing Associates	Lola-Cosworth T298

=== Complete 24 Hours of Le Mans results ===
Year	Class	No	Tyres	Car	Team	Co-Drivers	Laps	Pos.	Class Pos.
1975	GT	69		Porsche 911 Carrera RSR; Porsche F6 2v SOHC 2992cc	(Belgium) ”Beurlys”	(Belgium) ”Jean Beurlys” (United Kingdom) John Cooper	311	6th	2nd
1976	GT	70		Porsche 934; Porsche 930/71 F6 2992cc Turbo	(Belgium) ”Beurlys”	(Belgium) ”Jean Beurlys” (Australia) John Goss	168	NC	
1977	Gr.5	42		Porsche 935; Porsche 930/72 F6 2807cc Turbo	(Germany) Porsche Kremer Racing	(United Kingdom) John Fitzpatrick (United Kingdom) Guy Edwards	15	DNF engine	
1978	S+2.0	12	G	De Cadenet Lola T380; Ford Cosworth DFV V8/90° DOHC 2993cc	(France) Simon Phillips Racing with Batco Racing	(United Kingdom) John Bealsey (United Kingdom) Simon Phillips	99	NC; Insufficient distance covered	
1979	IMSA+2.5	61	M	Ferrari 512 BB; Ferrari F12 4942cc	(Belgium) ”Beurlys”	(Belgium) Bernard de Dryver (United Kingdom) Steve O'Rourke	274	12th	5th
1980	S+2.0	11		De Cadenet Lola LM; Ford Cosworth DFV V8/90° 4v DOHC 2993cc	(United Kingdom) Nick Faure	(Belgium) Bernard de Dryver (United Kingdom) Richard Jones		DNQ	
1981	S+2.0	21	D	De Cadenet Lola LM; Ford Cosworth DFV V8/90° 4v DOHC 2993cc	(United Kingdom) Dorset Racing Associates	(Republic of Ireland) Vivian Candy (Republic of Ireland) Martin Birrane	171	DNF; Gearbox casing	
1982	C	16	A	Lola T610; Ford Cosworth DFL V8 3955cc	(United Kingdom) Ultramar Team Lola	(United Kingdom) Guy Edwards (United Kingdom) Rupert Keegan	72	DNF; Head gasket	
1983	C	41		EMKA C83/1; Aston Martin Tickford V8/90° 2v DOHC 5340cc	(United Kingdom) EMKA Productions Ltd.	(United Kingdom) Tiff Needell (United Kingdom) Steve O'Rourke	275	17th	13th
1984	C1	38	D	Dome RC82; Ford Cosworth DFL V8/90° 3296cc	(United Kingdom) Dorset Racing Associates	(United Kingdom) Richard Jones (Republic of Ireland) Mark Galvin	156	DNF; Oil pressure	
1985	C1	66	D	EMKA C84/1; Aston Martin Tickford V8/90° 2v DOHC 5340cc	(United Kingdom) EMKA Productions Ltd.	(United Kingdom) Tiff Needell (United Kingdom) Steve O'Rourke	338	11th	11th

=== Complete 24 Hours of Spa results ===
Year	Class	No	Tyres	Car	Team	Co-Drivers	Laps	Pos.	Class Pos.
1989	N/Div.3	59		Opel Kadett GSi 16V; Opel L4 1998cc	(Belgium) East Belgian Racing Team	(Switzerland) ”Nico” (Germany) Wolf-Dieter Feuerlein	377	36th	4th
