= Nick Freeman =

English solicitor (born 1956)

This article is written in British English, which has its own spelling conventions (colour, travelled, centre, defence, artefact, analyse) and some terms may be different or absent from other varieties of English. According to the relevant style guide, this should not be changed without broad consensus.

Nick Freeman (born December 1956) is an English lawyer best known for specialising in the defence of traffic and speeding cases as well as road safety campaigning. He is the owner of Manchester based legal practice Freeman & Co.

Freeman has been nicknamed "Mr Loophole" by the British tabloid press, a sobriquet which he has since trademarked. In 2012 Freeman was voted Britain's Highest Profile Solicitor by Sweet & Maxwell.

Along with his partner, TV presenter Melissa Porter, Freeman has branched out into life coaching, co-creating a YouTube channel called The Life Coach and the Lawyer. He has also adopted Porter's son, Pierce, stating that "Adoption was something I've always wanted to do and this is a very natural process".

Freeman makes multiple media appearances including BBC, ITV, Sky News, GB News, TalkTV, The Mike Graham Show, Jeremy Vine on 5, Storm Huntley, Matt Alright, Vanessa Feltz, the JVS Show and many regional radio shows; where he uses his legal and road safety knowledge to inform and advise the public about legislation changes, arguing that dangerous cyclists should have their driving licences confiscated and be subject to drink and drug testing. Freeman is also a regular columnist for national newspapers including the Sunday Times Car Clinic. Aside from his unique insight into road traffic matters, Freeman contributes to discussions on politics and criminal law, amongst other things.

== Early life ==
Freeman is Jewish. He was privately educated at Uppingham School in Rutland. His father worked in retail, but warned him there would not be a business for him to take over. Although harbouring ambitions to become a professional golfer, he was persuaded to study law. Freeman completed his A-levels a year early, and went on to study law at Trent Polytechnic, and at the College of Law in Chester.

== Career ==
On graduation, Freeman became an articled clerk in Nottingham. He won an advocacy competition and was hired as a prosecutor for Greater Manchester Police in 1981. In 1983, he moved to a firm of criminal lawyers in Manchester and was a partner within six months.

Aged 42, Freeman left and set up Freeman & Co in Manchester. He gained notoriety for securing acquittals for several celebrities.

=== Loopholes ===
- A motorcyclist was acquitted of a 132 mph speeding charge when Freeman quoted case law from 1922.
- Ashley Fitton was cleared of drunk-driving based on the defence of coercion from the Criminal Justice Act 1925, claiming she was terrified she would be hurt by her husband if she did not drive him.
- Freeman "defended a businessman who had crashed his car and was taken to hospital seriously injured", and who was over the drink-drive limit, and was acquitted as "the relevant legislation says that the blood must be taken by someone who is not associated with the driver's care. In this case, it was taken by a surgeon directly involved, and so the man was acquitted."

On the ethics of using loopholes, Freeman comments:

Morally, I can't [justify it], but ethically, I can. My job is to give my clients the best defence I can. That is the job of every defence lawyer. I can't pick and choose who I defend based on my opinion; that would mean I was judging them, and that would be a dereliction of my duty. If I repeatedly identify shortcomings in police procedures, then perhaps we will end up with better standards in policing and then we will all be safer on the roads because people will not take chances. Until then, it is my job to identify inadequate policing and procedures. I want to make one thing clear, however. I do not condone drunk-driving or irresponsible driving of any kind. And where I successfully defend clients I will often take them to one side and give them a polite ticking-off, tell them they have been very lucky and advise them to use that luck by not transgressing again.

=== Clients ===
His first high-profile case was that of Alex Ferguson in 1999. Freeman argued that Ferguson had to use the hard shoulder to get to the training ground to allow for his upset stomach and need for a toilet. Shortly after this Freeman successfully argued special reasons for David Beckham, overturning an eight month disqualification for speeding on the basis that he was being chased by the paparazzi. Clients since have included:

- Joe Cole – Cole was caught speeding at 105 mph but Freeman persuaded magistrates to delay the 50-day ban as Cole's wife was unable to drive. This was due to a traumatising incident where she was car-jacked by eight men and meant she was unwilling to get behind the wheel.
- Ranulph Fiennes – Fiennes escaped prosecution for an alleged driving offence after Freeman pointed out that the letters which were intended to summon Fiennes to court were addressed instead to a 'Mr Ran Flenns'.
- Van Morrison – The singer was clocked at 36 mph in his BMW in a 30 mph zone in Taunton, Somerset. He was due to be tried in court for his offence but Freeman discovered prosecution papers had been served late and argued the delay was unfair and the Crown Prosecution Service decided to drop the case.
- Frank Lampard – Lampard was fined £850 and handed six penalty points on his licence after he admitted speeding at 84 mph on a 50 mph road. He pleaded guilty after video footage showed his speeding. Freeman urged the court to consider points rather than a ban as the footballer needed to drive to see his children regularly, who live with his former partner.
- Ian Brown – After Freeman defended the Stone Roses lead singer for being caught driving at 105 mph on the M6. Freeman persuaded the court not to disqualify him, so that he could fulfil his domestic duties, such as picking his son up from school to take him out for dinner and going to the supermarket for his elderly parents.
- Caprice Bourret – Freeman claimed the model had a urinary tract infection, and that she was affected by the drugs she was taking. Banned for 12 months.
- Lee Bowyer – the Crown Prosecution Service initially alleged that Bowyer had been driving at an average 112 mph (180 km/h) on the A1, peaking at 132 mph (212 km/h). Freeman negotiated with the CPS at Northumberland court, following irregularities with the road markings, (which were too short, giving a *lower* speed than expected). The West Ham United midfielder pleaded guilty instead to driving at 99 mph (159 km/h) on the A1. He was banned (as it was his second speeding offence in three years) for 42 days and fined £650. It prompted a furious response from road safety charity Brake.
- Jimmy Carr – cleared of using a mobile phone while driving at Harrow Magistrates' Court after Freeman argued that Carr had used the dictation setting of his iPhone to record a joke as he drove and that using the phone for such a purpose was not illegal under current law.
- Jeremy Clarkson – after being loaned a car by Alfa Romeo, the vehicle was caught doing 82 mph (131 km/h) in a 50 mph (80 km/h) zone on the A40 in Hillingdon. Alfa Romeo sent the ticket to Clarkson, who was acquitted and awarded costs because the prosecution did not offer evidence as to who the actual driver was at the time of the offence.
- Andy Cole
- Andrew Flintoff – caught on camera doing 87 mph (140 km/h) in a temporary 50 mph (80 km/h) zone, Freeman pointed out that the prosecution notice was sent two days later than the law allows. Flintoff only had to turn up at Liverpool Magistrates Court to confirm his name, age and address to be acquitted.
- Claire Ince, the wife of then Wolverhampton Wanderers player Paul Ince. Caught travelling at 100 mph in her husband's Mercedes-Benz CL600 along the M56 at Thornton-Le-Moors by Cheshire Police, they sent a Section 172 notice to Paul, the registered keeper. Claire filled in the form, and was asked to attend court. Facing an immediate ban, Freeman said that Claire should have been sent her own Section 172, before being charged. She was acquitted.
- Steve McFadden – who "had a remarkable capacity for drink" and was examined by a police surgeon, had drunk the equivalent of nine double vodkas, and was found "for all intents and purposes to be quite sober". McFadden was banned for 18 months, which is a fairly lenient sentence for the amount of alcohol in his blood.
- Colin Montgomerie – acquitted when the policeman who was said to have caught him travelling at 96 mph (154 km/h) on the A3 near Esher, Surrey (a 70 mph (112 km/h) road) at 12:50 am failed to attend court, making it impossible to prove that he was driving. Got him off a second time from a 56-day ban in November 2008, after caught driving his Bentley Continental Flying Spur and failing to pay the fine. Freeman revealed that Montgomerie hated flying, and drove 55,000 miles (89,000 km) per annum in part to see his Surrey-based children from his Scottish base. In 2010, Freeman had Montgomerie's points-tot-up ban quashed after revealing the indiscriminate way in which the civilian speed gun operator at Corby Hill, Carlisle had 'zapped' 390 cars in 73 minutes, one every 11 seconds, including Montgomerie's BMW X5 as well as a jogger. The case resulted in over 100 drivers having their points also quashed, and the tax payer with a £30,000 legal bill.
- Tiff Needell – cleared of failing to supply details in relation to a speeding ticket, and the speeding offence by Pontypridd magistrates
- Ronnie O'Sullivan – Freeman accused the magistrate of winking at a journalist. The magistrate replied: "Why would I wink at anybody? Do you think I'm gay or something?" Freeman subsequently had the trial stopped. At the retrial, the court accepted the explanation that O'Sullivan was "too depressed" to provide a urine sample.
- Wayne Rooney – cleared of driving without insurance when Freeman said that a requested adjournment had not been granted and the hearing had been conducted in absentia.
- William Stobart – the driver of a car allegedly doing 116 mph (185 km/h) on the M6 claimed he was William Stobart: but was he the same William Stobart who exercised his right not to attend the hearing at Penrith Magistrates? The court decided the prosecution had not proved the driver was Freeman's client, Cumbrian haulage tycoon William Stobart.
- Matthew Vaughn
- Jonathan Woodgate – banned from driving and since convicted of affray. Freeman defended Woodgate successfully in August 2008, after the footballer was allegedly caught doing 85 mph (135 km/h) in a restricted zone in his Mercedes Benz S65 AMG on the A66 near Stockton-on-Tees. The judge dismissed the case as the police said the measurement was taken over a distance of 519 metres, while Freeman showed that the road section was only 405 metres long.
- Dwight Yorke – acquitted when a Home Office-approved speed gun could not be shown to have been used under the correct conditions of approval. Freeman defended Yorke again in January 2008, whereby Yorke refused to sign police documentation to confirm he accepted he was speeding at 95 mph (152 km/h). Freeman advised Yorke to plead guilty to a charge of 85 mph (135 km/h), which resulted in a fine of £315 and 3points – keeping Yorke below 12 points, and an automatic ban.
- The husband of Coronation Street actress Vicky Entwistle, Andrew Chapman, was represented by Freeman against an allegation that he punched a fan who approached his wife on a train and asked her for a photo. Chapman pleaded not guilty at Salford magistrates' court, but was convicted of common assault and fined.
- Paddy McGuinness – the comedian was acquitted of a driving ban in October 2017 despite having pleaded guilty. McGuinness was caught speeding in August 2016 but the case was later dismissed at Manchester Magistrates' Court after the lawyer argued the Crown Prosecution Service (CPS) had displayed a 'cavalier approach' to the case.
- Sir Harry Djanogly CBE – charged with driving his five-litre silver Jaguar XK dangerously on The Westway A40, Hammersmith in December 2014 and assaulting Police Sergeant Robert McDonald on the same occasion but was cleared under Freeman's counsel as Djanogly claimed he was speeding to get his sick wife to hospital.
- Kenneth Hugill, an 83 year old farmer, was charged with GBH when he shot an intruder on his farm in November 2015. Though the jury at Kingston upon Hull Crown Court took just 24 minutes to clear him of grievous bodily harm, Mr Hugill still had to pay the £30,000 legal costs incurred during the three-day trial. Mr Freeman was so outraged by this that he set up a crowdfunding page to help pay for these believing that the outcome 'was not justice'
- In 2015 Freeman represented Lynette Tweedale pro bono, after Tweedale was ordered by the Bedford Borough Council to pay a £50 fine after walking her dog without a lead in a Bedford cemetery. Freeman took Tweedale's case after hearing her speak about it on BBC Radio 3 Three Counties Radio - The JVS Show. The case against Tweedale was dropped in December 2015.

== Arrest ==
On 30 October 2006, Freeman and one other man were arrested by Greater Manchester Police at premises in the centre of Manchester and held at a police station. The arrest was for suspicion of conspiracy to pervert the course of justice by encouraging a client to lie under oath, and the arrest was on behalf of an investigation being undertaken by Gwent Police. Freeman denied the allegations, and after an extended release on bail, no charges were brought against him after it emerged that he had not spoken to the client.

== Campaigning ==
In 2021, Freeman created a petition calling for cyclists and e-scooter riders to be required to display visible identification, to use cycle lanes where available, and for the introduction of a licensing and penalty point system. The petition received 10,000 signatures, and the government responded that it had no plans to introduce such requirements for cyclists. Freeman has also been campaigning for a reduction of the drink driving limit in England & Wales for many years. Freeman continues to argue against the blanket imposition of 20 mph speed limits around the country, in favour of a dynamic speed limit. He has further made calls to increase the motorway speed limit to 80 mph.

In 2014, he established the "Save the Staffy" website as part of his campaign against negative stereotypes about the Staffordshire Bull Terrier dog breed. Freeman also launched a new website called "Other End of the Lead" in 2023, to highlight dog behaviour and it is normally the owner and not the dog which is the problem.

== Books ==
- The Art of the Loophole: David Beckham's lawyer teaches you how to make the law work for you (2013), Coronet Books ISBN 9781444734089
