= Tiff Needell =

British racing driver and television presenter (born 1951)

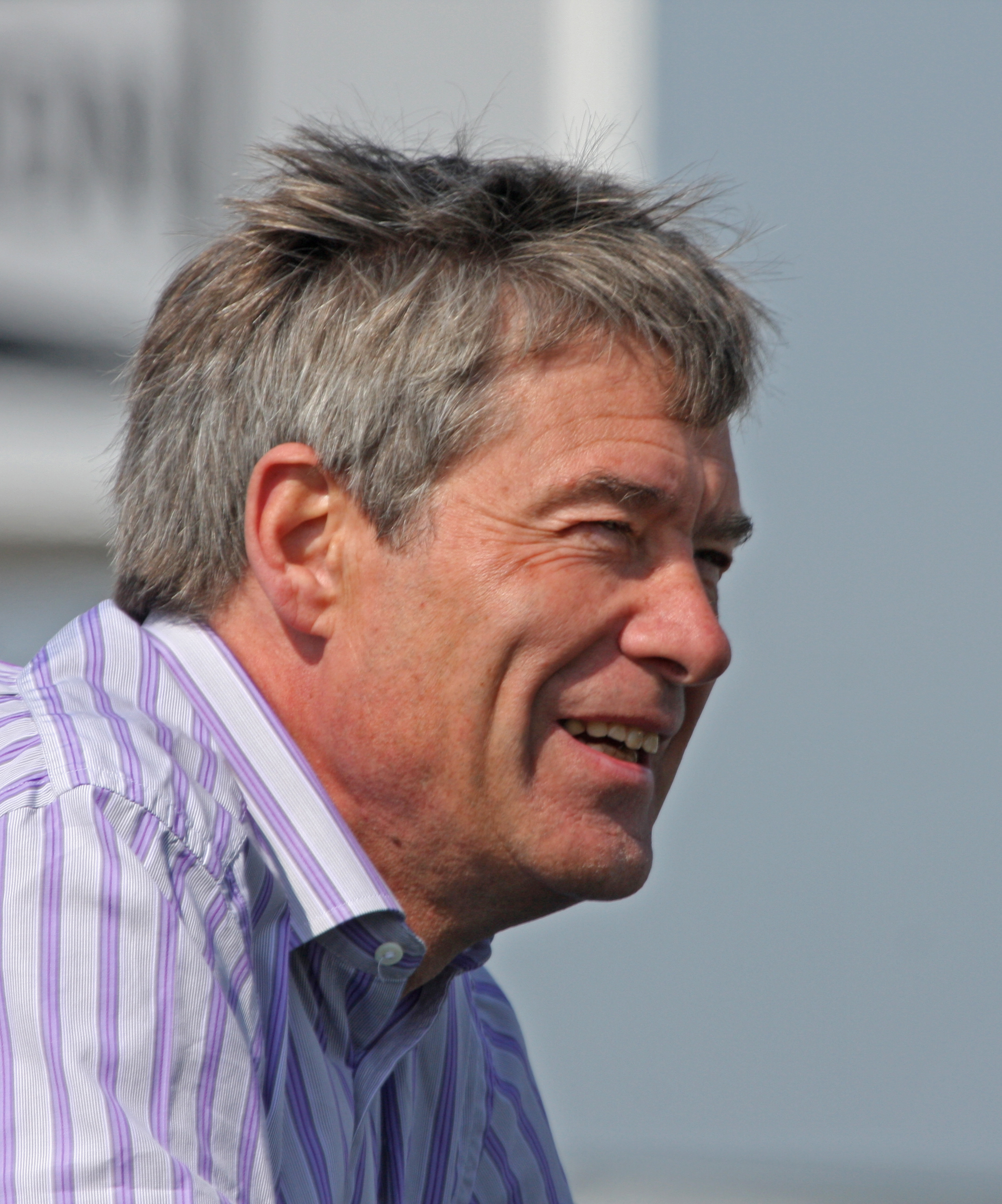
- Needell in 2009
- Born: Timothy Richard Needell; 29 October 1951 (age 75); Havant, Hampshire, England

Formula One World Championship career
- Nationality: (United Kingdom) British
- Active years: 1980
- Team: Ensign
- Entries: 2 (1 start)
- Championships: 0
- Wins: 0
- Podiums: 0
- Career points: 0
- Pole positions: 0
- Fastest laps: 0
- First entry: 1980 Belgian Grand Prix
- Last entry: 1980 Monaco Grand Prix

British Formula One Championship career
- Active years: 1979
- Entries: 8
- Championships: 0
- Wins: 0
- Podiums: 1
- Career points: 7
- Pole positions: 0
- Fastest laps: 0

Timothy Richard "Tiff" Needell (born 29 October 1951) is a British racing driver and television presenter. He is a presenter of Lovecars, and formerly served as co-presenter of Top Gear and Fifth Gear.

== Biography ==
Needell attended Ottershaw School followed by City University, London where he achieved an Honours Degree in Civil Engineering. Hired by George Wimpey & Co, his day job was as a Structural Design Engineer. As a teenager, Needell worked as an auxiliary postman during Christmas in 1967 with one of the houses he delivered to being Bruce McLaren's.

=== Racing career ===
Needell first raced at a driving school at Brands Hatch in 1970. He progressed to Formula Ford, his progress assisted by the use of a Lotus 69 FF he won in an Autosport magazine competition. He later sold his Lotus and used the money to buy and race an Elden Mk10. Needell's Formula Ford period culminated in his acquiring a Crosslé 25F with which he won the Kent Messenger FF Championship after competing for only half of the remaining season. This success landed him a partly paid drive in the Formula Ford 2000 Championship in a Hawke chassis provided by McKinstry Racing. Needell was completely dominant in that car and series which provided him with the springboard into Formula 3. The remainder of the 1970s saw Needell as a front-runner in the British Formula 3 series and then in the Aurora British Formula One championship. In 1979, he was unable to graduate to the Formula One World Championship due to the lack of the correct licence, but he was back in 1980, driving two Grands Prix for Ensign, qualifying for the Belgian Grand Prix at Zolder. However, he had an engine problem and did not finish the race. He subsequently failed to qualify for the Monaco Grand Prix.

In 1988 and 1989, Needell competed in the British Rallycross Grand Prix in a Metro 6R4 prepared by Will Gollop's motorsport team. He achieved a good result in 1988 finishing fourth in the B-Final in what was his first rallycross event, however, the 1989 event was cancelled due to heavy fog after the practice sessions.

Needell made his first appearance at the 24 Hours of Le Mans in 1981 driving an Ibec-Hesketh 308LM alongside Tony Trimmer. They failed to finish and again in 1982 this time paired with Bob Evans and Geoff Lees in an Aston Martin Nimrod NRA/C2. However the following year, Needell finished 17th driving a Porsche 956. In 1985, Needell briefly led the 24 hours driving the Aston Martin EMKA C84/1 and would eventually finish 11th.

Needell's best result at Le Mans was third overall in 1990, on the podium driving a Porsche 962C with David Sears and Anthony Reid.

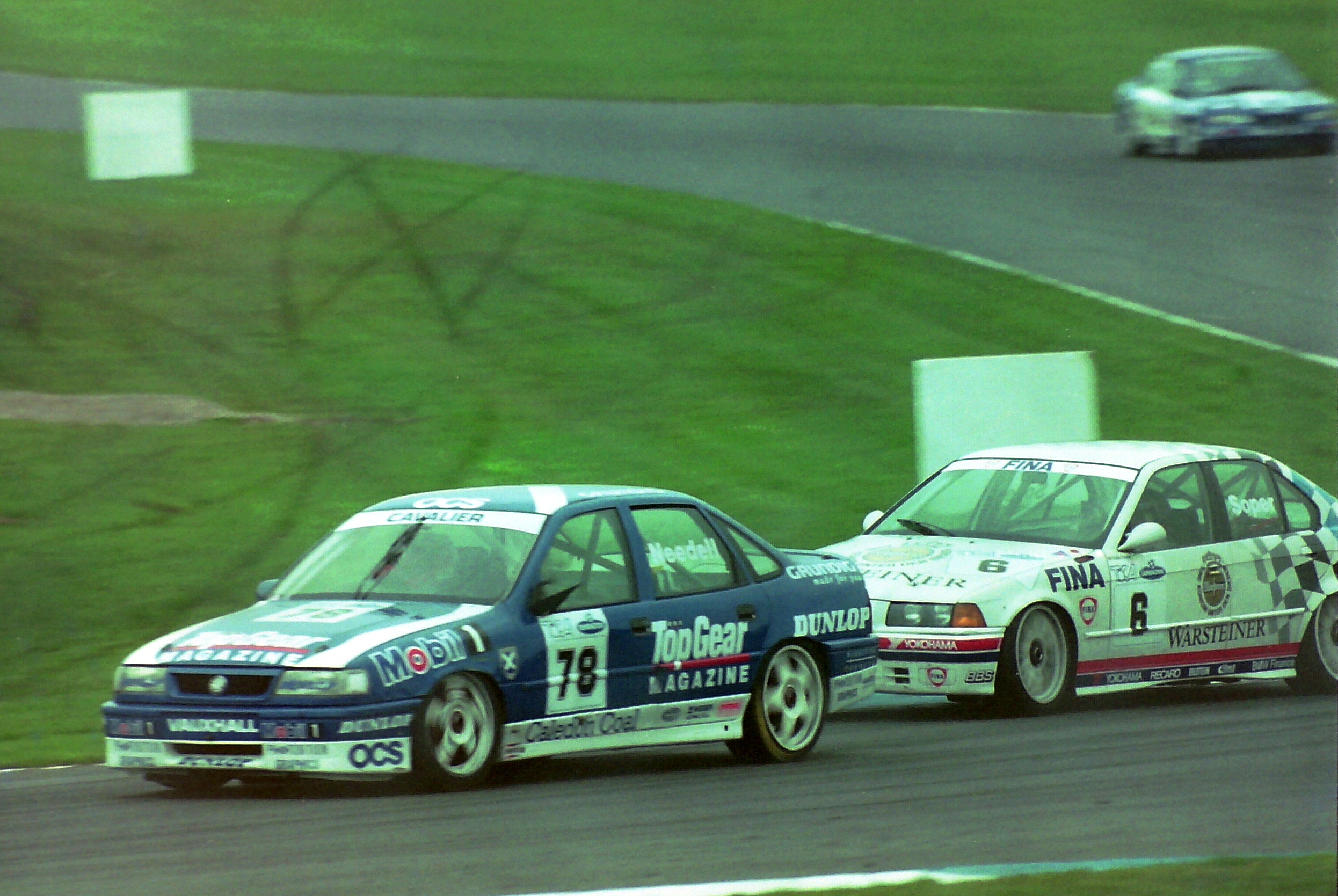
Needell driving the Ecurie Ecosse Vauxhall Cavalier at Donington Park during the 1993 TOCA Shootout.

Needell then had a couple of years in the British Touring Car Championship with Nissan, before returning to sports cars in 1995, driving a Porsche at Daytona and a Jaguar XJ220 at Le Mans.

Needell then drove the Lister Storm for five years, reaching third overall at Daytona in 1997 before gearbox problems dropped them to nineteenth. In 1998, he finished fifth in the British GT Championship and won the Silverstone Golden Jubilee Trophy race. That same year, he was to be part of Lister's assault on Le Mans, but the car failed scrutineering and thus didn't qualify. In 2000, he again drove for Lister, this time in three races of the British GT Championship, winning all of them. He won at Donington Park in the main Lister entry and then competed in two further rounds in the CSi privately entered Lister. Due to the late entry, this car wasn't registered for championship points, but Needell won both races at Circuit de Spa-Francorchamps and Silverstone Circuit. He also took part in the 2000 FIA GT Championship for one round at Zolder.

Since then, Needell's racing career has mainly consisted of racing closed-wheel cars, with varying levels of success in sports cars, historic racing and touring cars. He achieved particular notoriety after an accident with Nigel Mansell at the 1993 TOCA shoot out race at Donington Park.

=== Television career ===
Needell is a television presenter and motoring journalist and co-hosted the original run of the BBC TV series Top Gear starting in 1987. In 2001, when the BBC cancelled Top Gear (the show was revived in 2002 under a new format), Needell and the whole cast defected and signed with Channel 5 to produce and host a new motoring show named Fifth Gear. Needell has also co-presented 'MPH' at Earls Court in 2003, 2004 and 2005 with Jeremy Clarkson and Richard Hammond and in 2006 with Clarkson and James May (because Hammond was recovering from an on-location accident in a rocket car which rolled over at top speed, leaving him in a coma). He also appeared very briefly in the 2005 Top Gear Comic Relief special, "Stars in Fast Cars". In 2009, he appeared on James May's Toy Stories featuring the building of a Scalextric around Brooklands, and also visited James May's Lego house. In 2011, he appeared on Top Gear, driving the Ariel Atom V8 in a race against a BMW S1000RR around the Top Gear Test Track. The segment was done in humour, with May supposedly driving the Atom V8, only for it to actually be Needell.

Needell was one of several people suspected of portraying the elusive masked racing driver The Stig on the current format of Top Gear. The true identity of The Stig was eventually revealed as being Ben Collins late in production, necessitating Needell's return to Top Gear after a nine-year absence to train director Danny Boyle for his lap in the "Star In A Reasonably Priced Car" segment. In the same episode Clarkson referred to Needell as the "Emergency Stig".

On 22 September 2013, Needell co-starred in Tommy Kendall's Fox Sports 1 show, Driven - A Race Without Boundaries.

In 2016, Needell announced that Fifth Gear had ended. In 2018, Needell and others announced a new series of Fifth Gear was being filmed and will be shown on Quest in September of the same year; however, the 2019 series no longer features Needell in their presenter line-up.

In 2020, Needell featured on a new TV show Lovecars: On The Road, which originated from the Lovecars YouTube channel where Needell travels Europe with his co-presenter Paul Woodman to try out no fewer than 50 cars. In early 2024 it was announced that the second series of the show would be broadcast on Amazon Prime.

=== Other work ===
On 7 February 1999, Needell drove a McLaren F1 XP5 prototype to set the fastest lap record at the Millbrook Proving Ground in Bedfordshire, over a 2-mile (3.2 km) banked circuit, top speed test: An average speed of 195.3 mph (314.3 km/h) was attained, with a maximum speed of 200.8 mph (323.2 km/h).

In 2018, Needell started as a presenter with Lovecars. mainly for their car reviews on YouTube. together with co-host Paul Woodman. Notable reviews include the world's first Tesla race car, together with an ongoing series of Tiff Talks, where regular motoring news is discussed.

Needell writes for the magazine Modern Classic, together with a regular motor racing news feature on Drive Tribe.

Needell has lent his voice to the first and second games in the TOCA Touring Car series for British video game developer Codemasters. His voice is also featured in the Ferrari Challenge and Le Mans 24 Hours video game for racing game developer Eutechnyx. He also features in the video games Race Pro and GTR Evolution racing an Aston Martin DBR9. Additionally, he is the voice of the Road Angel road safety device and GPS speed camera alert system, as well as the face on their advertising campaigns. He was the launching announcer for the high speed Rita roller coaster at Alton Towers, as well as narrating several Discovery Channel documentaries.

Thruxton Circuit has an exclusive deal which enables customers to pay £175 for three laps of fast-paced driving and drifting with Needell. The laps are filmed from within the car and feature his commentary and conversation with the passenger.

Needell has also presented the world series of Powerboat racing throughout the United Kingdom. Working with Greenlight TV and Powerboat GP, Needell regularly commentates, casts voice-overs and interviews drivers.

Starting in 2025, Needell has appeared as an occasional presenter on Richard Hammond's DriveTribe YouTube channel, generally doing new car reviews. Needell had previously made several guest appearances on the channel.

== Personal life ==
As of 2009, Needell lived in Wiltshire with his wife Patsy and his three sons. As of 2016, his younger brother is a team manager for Barwell Motorsports team.

In November 2006, Needell was cleared of 'failing to supply details in relation to a speeding ticket', and the accompanying speeding offence by Pontypridd magistrates. He was defended by Nick Freeman, otherwise known as Mr. Loophole, who also defended former colleague Jeremy Clarkson on a similar case.

Needell is a football fan and supports Southampton. He is also an active user of X (formerly Twitter).

Needell also works as an after-dinner speaker.

== Racing record ==
=== Complete Formula One results ===
(key)

Year	Entrant	Chassis	Engine	1	2	3	4	5	6	7	8	9	10	11	12	13	14	WDC	Points
1980	Unipart Racing Team	Ensign N180	Cosworth V8	ARG	BRA	RSA	USW	BEL; Ret	MON; DNQ	FRA	GBR	GER	AUT	NED	ITA	CAN	USA	NC	0

=== 24 Hours of Le Mans results ===
Year	Team	Co-Drivers	Car	Class	Laps	Pos.	Class Pos.
1981	(United Kingdom) Ian Bracey	(United Kingdom) Tony Trimmer	Ibec-Hesketh 308LM-Ford Cosworth	S +2.0	95	DNF	DNF
1982	(United Kingdom) Nimrod Racing Automobiles Ltd.	(United Kingdom) Bob Evans (United Kingdom) Geoff Lees	Nimrod NRA/C2-Aston Martin	C	55	DNF	DNF
1983	(United Kingdom) EMKA Productions Ltd.	(United Kingdom) Steve O'Rourke (United Kingdom) Nick Faure	EMKA C83/1-Aston Martin	C	275	17th	13th
1984	(Germany) Porsche Kremer Racing	(United Kingdom) David Sutherland (Australia) Rusty French	Porsche 956	C1	321	9th	9th
1985	(United Kingdom) EMKA Productions Ltd.	(United Kingdom) Steve O'Rourke (United Kingdom) Nick Faure	EMKA C84/1-Aston Martin	C1	338	11th	11th
1987	(Japan) Toyota Team Tom's	(Japan) Masanori Sekiya (Japan) Kaoru Hoshino	Toyota 87C-L	C1	39	DNF	DNF
1988	(Japan) Toyota Team Tom's	(Italy) Paolo Barilla (Japan) Hitoshi Ogawa	Toyota 88C	C1	283	24th	15th
1989	(United Kingdom) Richard Lloyd Racing	(United Kingdom) Derek Bell (United Kingdom) James Weaver	Porsche 962C GTi	C1	339	DNF	DNF
1990	(Japan) Alpha Racing Team	(United Kingdom) David Sears (United Kingdom) Anthony Reid	Porsche 962C	C1	352	**3rd**	**3rd**
1991	(Germany) Porsche Kremer Racing	(Mexico) Tomás López (Switzerland) Gregor Foitek	Porsche 962CK6	C2	18	DNF	DNF
1992	(United Kingdom) ADA Engineering	(United Kingdom) Derek Bell (United Kingdom) Justin Bell	Porsche 962C GTi	C3	284	12th	5th
1995	(United Kingdom) PC Automotive Jaguar	(United Kingdom) Richard Piper (United Kingdom) James Weaver	Jaguar XJ220	GT1	135	DNF	DNF
1996	(United Kingdom) Newcastle United Lister	(United Kingdom) Geoff Lees (United Kingdom) Anthony Reid	Lister Storm GTS	GT1	295	19th	11th
1997	(United Kingdom) Newcastle United Lister	(United Kingdom) Geoff Lees (South Africa) George Fouché	Lister Storm GTL	GT1	21	DNF	DNF

=== Complete European Touring Car Championship results ===
(key) (Races in bold indicate pole position) (Races in italics indicate fastest lap)

Year	Team	Car	1	2	3	4	5	6	7	8	9	10	11	12	13	14	DC	Pts
1979	(United Kingdom) **Fabergé Racing Lee Jeans**	Ford Capri III 3.0s	MNZ	VLL	MUG	BRH	JAR	ZEL	BRN	NUR	ZAN	SAL	PER	SIL; 4†	ZOL		NC	0
1980	(United Kingdom) **David Price Racing**	Rover 3500 SD1	MNZ	VLL	BRH	SAL	BRN	PER	NUR	SIL; Ret	ZOL						NC	0
1986	(West Germany) **HWRT Ford Tuning**	Ford Sierra XR4Ti	MNZ	DON	HOC	MIS	AND	BRN	ZEL	NÜR	SPA	SIL; Ret	NOG	ZOL	JAR	EST	NC	0
1988	(United Kingdom) **TOM's GB**	Toyota Corolla FX GT	MNZ	DON	EST	JAR	DIJ	VLL	NÜR	SPA	ZOL	SIL; 26	NOG				NC	0

† Not eligible for points.

=== Complete World Touring Car Championship results ===
(key) (Races in bold indicate pole position; races in italics indicate fastest lap)

Year	Entrant	Car	1	2	3	4	5	6	7	8	9	10	11	Pos.	Pts
1987	(United Kingdom) **TOM's GB**	Toyota Corolla FX GT	MNZ	JAR	DIJ	NÜR	SPA; Ret	BRN	SIL; 17	BAT	CLD	WEL	FUJ	NC	0

=== Complete British Touring Car Championship results ===
(key) (Races in bold indicate pole position - 1 point awarded) (Races in italics indicate fastest lap)

Year	Team	Car	Class	1	2	3	4	5	6	7	8	9	10	11	12	13	14	15	16	17	18	19	20	21	22	23	24	25	26	DC	Pts	Class
1987	TOM's GB	Toyota Corolla FX GT	D	SIL	OUL	THR	THR	SIL	SIL ovr:16 cls:4	BRH	SNE	DON		DON ovr:10 cls:2	SIL; Ret															18th	15	4th
1987	Chris Hodgetts Motorsport	Toyota Corolla GT	D										OUL ovr:5/3‡ cls:2/1‡																	18th	15	4th
1988	TOM's GB	Toyota Corolla FX GT	D	SIL	OUL	THR	DON ovr:15‡ cls:2‡	THR	SIL	SIL	BRH	SNE	BRH	BIR	DON	SIL														36th	6	9th
1989	Labatt's Team	Ford Sierra RS500	A	OUL	SIL	THR	DON ovr:1‡ cls:1‡	THR	SIL	SIL	BRH	SNE	BRH	BIR	DON	SIL														28th	9	8th
1992	Nissan Janspeed Racing	Nissan Primera eGT		SIL	THR	OUL	SNE	BRH	DON; 1	DON; 2	SIL	KNO; 1	KNO; 2	PEM	BRH; 1	BRH; 2	DON	SIL; 10												26th	1	
1993	Ecurie Ecosse Vauxhall	Vauxhall Cavalier		SIL	DON; Ret	SNE	DON																							NC	0	
1993	Nissan Castrol Racing	Nissan Primera eGT						OUL; 12	BRH; 1 Ret	BRH; 2; 10	PEM; 19	SIL; Ret	KNO; 1; 13	KNO; 2; 12	OUL	BRH; Ret	THR	DON; 1	DON; 2	SIL										NC	0	
1994	Old Spice Nissan Racing	Nissan Primera eGT		THR	BRH; 1	BRH; 2	SNE	SIL; 1	SIL; 2	OUL; 17	DON; 1	DON; 2	BRH; 1 Ret	BRH; 2; 18	SIL; DNS	KNO; 1; 10	KNO; 2; 16	OUL; 13	BRH; 1; 17	BRH; 2; 9	SIL; 1; 15	SIL; 2; 14	DON; 1; 15	DON; 2; 15						21st	3	
1998	Vodafone Nissan Racing	Nissan Primera GT		THR; 1	THR; 2	SIL; 1	SIL; 2	DON; 1	DON; 2	BRH; 1	BRH; 2	OUL; 1	OUL; 2	DON; 1	DON; 2	CRO; 1	CRO; 2	SNE; 1	SNE; 2	THR; 1	THR; 2	KNO; 1	KNO; 2	BRH; 1; 12	BRH; 2; 15	OUL; 1	OUL; 2	SIL; 1	SIL; 2	NC	0	
2001	Team Kaliber Sport with Barwell	Honda Accord	P	BRH; 1	BRH; 2	THR; 1	THR; 2	OUL; 1	OUL; 2	SIL; 1	SIL; 2	MON; 1	MON; 2	DON; 1	DON; 2	KNO; 1	KNO; 2	SNE; 1	SNE; 2	CRO; 1	CRO; 2	OUL; 1 ovr:14† cls:7†	OUL; 2 DNS	SIL; 1	SIL; 2	DON; 1	DON; 2	BRH; 1	BRH; 2	N/A	0	NC

† Not eligible for points.

‡ Endurance driver.

=== Complete British GT Championship results ===
(key) (Races in bold indicate pole position) (Races in italics indicate fastest lap)

Year	Team	Car	Class	1	2	3	4	5	6	7	8	9	10	11	12	Pos	Points
2000	Cirtek Motorsport	Lister Storm	GT	THR; 1	CRO; 1	OUL; 1	DON; 1	SIL; 1	BRH; 1	DON; 1; 1	CRO; 1	SIL; 1	SNE; 1			25th	15
2000	CSi Brookspeed Racing	Lister Storm	GT											SPA; 1; 1†	SIL; 1; 1†	25th	15

† Not eligible for points.

=== Complete WRC results ===
Year	Entrant	Car	1	2	3	4	5	6	7	8	9	10	11	12	13	14	WDC	Points
1992	Ford Motor Co Ltd	Ford Sierra RS Cosworth 4x4	MON	SWE	POR	KEN	FRA	GRE	NZL	ARG	FIN	AUS	ITA	CIV	ESP	GBR; 30	NC	0
