= Len Bailey =

Automobile designer

Leonard Bailey
- Born: 25 July 1926
- Died: 23 June 1997 (aged 70)
- Occupation: Automobile Designer

Leonard Bailey (25 July 1926 – 23 June 1997) was a British automobile designer.

== Career ==
Leonard Bailey became an apprentice at Austin at Longbridge in 1942 which at that time were building Short Stirlings for the Royal Air Force of World War II. Building up his experience at Daimler and Rover in Coventry before moving back to Austin which became part of British Motor Corporation (BMC) in 1952 to work in the engine department. He moved to the US and by mid 1956 was working at American Motors working on that company's first in-house V8 after a deal to buy Packard V8 became too expensive. In 1958 he move to Ford head office at Dearborn, Michigan working in their engine department but was moved to the Experimental Department by Roy Lunn. He worked on prototypes under him including the development of Ford turbine cars and he was part of the design team that built a two-seat Ford Mustang I in 1962.

== Ford Racing ==
With Ford taking a more pro active motor spot stance in 1963 he was moved back to England to a position of chief draftsman as part of the design team for Fords new GT40 sport car with Ford Advanced Vehicles Ltd FAV department in Slough. Lola had completed a Ford-powered, mid-engined sports car in 1963 this would form the basis for the Ford assault on winning Le-Mans, the new project was to be based at FAV. They would have responsible for the engineering of the chassis, body and construction of the cars. Eric Broadley was initially responsible for the overall design, but Len Bailey later took care of the chassis reengineering it from Aluminum to Steel for more durability in the 24-hour Race. Ford felt it was also necessary to cope with the added weight of the more powerful all aluminum, dry-sump Ford Fairlane engine. By 1966 he was based at Alan Mann Racing in Byfleet, Surrey, although still employed by Ford of Europe. Early in 1966 several chassis were shipped to the United States to be fitted with the larger, more powerful engine in preparation for Fords third attempt at taking that elusive Le Mans win. These seven-litre cars are now referred to as Mark IIs. No fewer than eight GT40 Mark IIs were race prepared for the 1966 24 Hours of Le Mans. Although entered by three different privateer teams, all factory Ferraris had retired by 17 hours, as had nine of the Fords, but three held together long enough to score an historic photo staged 1–2-3 finish.

For 1967 Ford USA decided to concentrate its resources on a second Le Mans win and fielded the GT40 Mk IV, a newer car redesigned in the US with a different chassis and a different body. Bailey redesigned the two GT40s entered by John Wyer of JW Automotive for the manufacturer's championship. These were lightweight variations of the GT40 with a slimmer windscreen and altered roof line, cut off tail, and lighter aluminum body panels. Entered as the Mirage M1 with Gulf Oil sponsorship. Ford left the Mirages and privateer GT-40's to represent them in the intervening championship events at Monza, Spa, Targa Florio and Nürburgring.

In late 1966 he completed the design of The Honker II a 1967 Can Am car, built by Alan Mann Racing, and run by Holman Moody. (It was named after John Holman, who liked to use the air horns on the big-rig trucks he drove). Powered came from an injected 351 cubic inch engine for its first race at Bridgehampton, New York where it qualified 17th and finished 8th and a 377 cubic inch for Mosport Ontario where it qualified 17th but didn't start -painted metallic it never raced again.

For 1968 the FIA redrew the rules for the sports car racing championship. Engine capacity was limited to 3 litres for the prototype Group 6 class. Bailey was charged by Ford Europe to create a car for this championship resulting in the Ford P68 of 1968 redesigned to the P69 for 1969 built and run by Alan Mann Racing.

While at Alan Mann Racing, Bailey designed the bodies of a pair of gull-wing door cars constructed of aluminum, used in the 1969 Gerry Anderson science fiction film Doppelgänger. The cars were assembled over a six-month period on modified Ford Zodiac Mk4 platforms fitted with Ford Escort engines and gearboxes. Two cars were also used in the Gerry Anderson UFO (TV series).

During 1967–68 he did the suspension and brake work (developing rear disc brakes) on the new Ford Escort for rallying and racing, Alan Mann having a contact to run in the British Saloon Car Championship for Frank Gardner who won the championship in 1968 and 1969.

At the end of 1969 Bailey penned the Alan Mann Open Sports Ford just before Mann wound up his operation in late 1969, this was raced semi-successfully in two Can-Am races during 1969. It had a DNF at Riverside, but finished third at Texas. Bailey then began a freelance career although Ford work was a large part of it.

== Freelance ==
As a freelance designer, his first single seat racing car was the 2.5 liter Alfa Romeo powered Mildren Mono, built for Australian patron Alec Mildren. Frank Gardner drove the car to sixth place in the 1969 Tasman Series and Kevin Bartlett won the 1969 Australian Drivers' Championship with it. Gardner then commissioned a monocoque F5000 car intended for the 1970 UK season, but Gardner signed with Lola instead and the project was passed on to Palliser Racing Cars. where it was became the Palliser WDA1. He also worked with Gardner to develop the ex-Bud Moore 1969 Trans-Am Boss 302 Mustang for an assault on Group 2 in the 1970 British Saloon Car Championship.

In 1970 Bailey had set up his own design office at Gomm Metal Developments in Woking. During the summer and autumn of 1970 he worked on a secret Ford rally project that would result in the iconic but unused Ford GT70 rally car. He followed this with more design work for JW Automotive, including the Cosworth DFV powered Gulf Mirage M6 sports car for the 1972 and 1973 World Sportscar Championship seasons. Frank Williams came calling in 1971 and Bailey drew the underperforming Politoys Ford FX3 of 1972 and the Iso Rivolta Ford FX3B of 1973.

He continued to do consultancy work throughout the 1970s and 1980s. Some of his work included the:

- Ford Fiesta Group 5 Rally Car (1978)
- Magnum 813 F3 car (1981)
- Ford C100 Group C car (1982)
- EMKA Racing C83-Aston Martin Group C car (1983)
- EMKA 84-Aston Martin Group C car (1984)
- AC Ace Chassis (1994)
