= EMKA Racing =

British racing team

EMKA Racing was a British racing team founded in 1980 by Steve O'Rourke, manager of the band Pink Floyd. The team occasionally ran under the name of EMKA Productions, the name of O'Rourke's management company. The team's name comes from O'Rourke's two daughters, Emma and Katheryne. O'Rourke and EMKA concentrated on sports car racing with brief interludes into British Formula One until 1985 when the team was broken up before returning again in 1991. The team was finally dissolved in early 2004 following O'Rourke's death. The team had won the drivers championship for O'Rourke and Tim Sugden in the British GT Championship in 1997 and 1998.

== History ==
=== 1980–1985 ===
Following Steve O'Rourke's years of amateur auto racing, he had succeeded in entering the 1979 24 Hours of Le Mans where he took a respectable 12th-place finish in a Ferrari 512BB. With Pink Floyd's scheduling becoming less of a conflict, O'Rourke was able to fully concentrate on racing and formed EMKA Racing, a division of his EMKA Productions record label, for the 1980 season. Debuting at the Six Hours of Silverstone, he took a seventh-place finish before taking 23rd at Le Mans.

Now established, O'Rourke purchased a BMW M1 and signed driver Derek Bell as his co-driver. Collaborating with Michael Cane Racing the team took a second-place finish at Silverstone before suffering problems at Le Mans with drivers David Hobbs and Eddie Jordan, future owner of Jordan Grand Prix. For Brands Hatch, the team took a third-place finish although O'Rourke himself did not drive the car.

For 1982, Derek Bell was replaced on the team by Nick Mason, drummer for Pink Floyd, who had been participating the past few years with the Dorset Racing team. The team did not see much success. In the same year, O'Rourke and EMKA also entered the British Formula One series for two races with a Williams FW07, scoring a third place at Thruxton Circuit.

For 1983, EMKA's success was recognised by Aston Martin, with the two reaching an agreement to run sportscars built by Michael Cane Racing and powered by Aston Martin engines. The first chassis, known as an EMKA C83/1, was designed by Len Bailey and used a production-based Aston Martin V8 engine as its powerplant. O'Rourke was joined in the cockpit by Tiff Needell and took 17th place at Le Mans in their debut year.

For 1985 the EMKA ASTON-MARTIN was modified by Michael Cane Racing with design work being done by Richard Owen and continued support from Aston Martin. O'Rourke and Needell took an eleventh-place finish at Le Mans which saw the entry briefly leading the race in the opening hours. The EMKA Aston Martin failed to finish any of the other races it appeared at that season. Steve O'Rourke decided to take a break from international motorsport.

=== 1991–2003 ===
O'Rourke would briefly return to racing in 1993, entering an old Porsche 935 in the new British GT Championship. However come 1995 he would bring EMKA Racing back full-time. Initially using his 935, he later purchased a new Porsche 911 GT2, which saw an eleventh-place finish at Silverstone in the BPR Global GT Series event. Joined by Guy Holmes, he would participate in the bulk of the 1996 BPR Global GT Series season, with best finishes of 18th at both Monza and Paul Ricard. He also made his first return to Le Mans since 1985, although his car would last a mere 32 laps before retiring.

For 1997, EMKA Racing would return to the British GT Championship. O'Rourke and co-driver Tim Sugden would take a best finish of second at Donington Park en route to taking the GT2 class drivers championship by the end of the season. With this success, O'Rourke made the decision to move to the more powerful GT1 class for 1998, purchasing a used McLaren F1 GTR. The team managed two wins in British GT at Oulton Park and Spa-Francorchamps, again earning them the championship in their class. The duo would also be joined by Bill Auberlen for Le Mans, earning a fourth-place finish, O'Rourke's personal best.

The team continued to campaign the McLaren F1 GTR in British GT in 1999, winning the round at Silverstone. Unfortunately the team would not be able to manage to win the drivers championship, finishing fifth instead. The top GT class would be abandoned in 2000 making the team's McLaren illegal, so O'Rourke joined EMKA Racing with fellow British team GTC Competition and moved the duo to the international FIA GT Championship's lower N-GT class, running a new Porsche 911 GT3-R. The team would have a best finish of second in class at the A1-Ring and would finish fourth in the teams championship.

The co-operation with GTC Competition and EMKA continued to campaign their Porsche in the N-GT class in 2001, again scoring their best result at the A1-Ring with a fourth-place finish in class. Unfortunately in the teams championship they managed to tie for eighth place, down from the previous year. The team would return again to British GT for 2002, with two third-place finishes at Brands Hatch and Castle Combe Circuit.

Citing health concerns, O'Rourke would retire towards the end of the 2002 season, with Martin Short taking over O'Rourke driving position alongside Tim Sugden as the team went into 2003. The team once again switched back to the FIA GT Championship's N-GT class, but with greater success. At the third round at Pergusa, the team won the N-GT class. This led to Porsche taking interest in the team and offering factory driver Emmanuel Collard. This led to a second class win at Anderstorp, and eventually fourth place in the N-GT team championship.

=== Demise ===
Mere days after the end of the FIA GT season, Steven O'Rourke would pass away in the United States due to a stroke. The team, which had received strong support from Porsche for preparation for the 2004 season, was unable to survive without O'Rourke's leadership. The team would fold prior to the start of the 2004 season, with its assets being sold off, including O'Rourke's racing cars such as his McLaren F1 GTR and the EMKA-badged Group C cars. Tim Sugden would also move on to the GruppeM team.

== See also ==
- EMKA Aston Martin
