= Steve O'Rourke =

English band manager (1940–2003)

Steve O'Rourke (1 October 1940 – 30 October 2003) was an English music manager and racing driver. He was the manager of Pink Floyd, a position he held from 1968 until his death. Among his accomplishments was negotiating Pink Floyd's split with bass player and main songwriter Roger Waters.

== Life and Pink Floyd management career ==
O'Rourke's father, Tommy O'Rourke, travelled from the west coast of Ireland to London for the premiere of the Robert Flaherty documentary film, Man of Aran, in which he appeared as a shark hunter. He then settled in London, where Steve was born in the suburb of Willesden.

O'Rourke trained as an accountant and went to work with the Bryan Morrison Agency, which became a part of NEMS Enterprises, as a junior agent and book keeper. Initially, O'Rourke booked gigs for Pink Floyd, while the band was managed by Peter Jenner and Andrew King. When Pink Floyd parted company with Syd Barrett in 1968, King and Jenner remained with Barrett, and O'Rourke took over managing the band. In the early 1970s, O'Rourke left NEMS, and founded his own company, EMKA Productions, named after his first daughter Emma Kate. (O'Rourke subsequently fathered another daughter and three sons).

O'Rourke suffered a stroke and died in Miami, Florida, in 2003.

== Motor racing ==
O'Rourke competed at the Le Mans 24 Hours in 1979, finishing 12th in a Ferrari 512 BB. He returned to Le Mans in 1980, but after a tyre exploded at nearly 200 mph (320 km/h) on the Mulsanne Straight (which subsequently destroyed the rear tail hood), O'Rourke bought the spare tail of a retired sister Ferrari in the pit lane to finish the race with a 23rd place overall.

O'Rourke also competed in the 24 Hours of Daytona in 2000 with his own team, EMKA Racing. A new Porsche 911 GT3 R was driven by himself, five-time Le Mans winner Derek Bell, Stephen Day and Tim Sugden. In the third hour, they retired from the race with accident damage.

== Other artists ==
Other artists managed by O'Rourke include:

- Kokomo, band
