= Lumpy =

Lumpy may refer to:

== Film and television ==
- Lumpy Rutherford, a friend of Wally Cleaver in the television series Leave it to Beaver
- Lumpy the Heffalump, a character in Walt Disney Winnie-the-Pooh films and a television series
- Lumpy the cook, in the 2005 film King Kong
- Lumpy, a fictional moose in the American flash cartoon Happy Tree Friends

== People ==
- Lumpy Stevens (1735–1819), English cricketer

== Other ==
- Lumpy Ridge, Rocky Mountain National Park, Colorado, United States
- TOM's Toyota LMP, a LeMans Prototype car nicknamed "Lumpy"
- LUMPY, original title of the 2012 film Best Man Down
