= Andy Thorby =

British racecar designer

Andrew Mark Thorby is a British racecar designer. Thorby designed many formula racing and Le Mans Prototype cars.

== History ==
=== Lola Cars ===
After graduation lawschool Thorby joined Specialised Mouldings Ltd. in Huntingdon in 1974. Specialised Mouldings Ltd. fabricated plastic and fibreglass body panels. Thorby joined Lola Cars in 1977 to follow his passion, designing cars. The Lola T500, built for the 1979 SCCA/CART Indy Car Series was one of the first cars Thorby worked on. Al Unser won the final race of the season in the Lola T500. Thorby designed Lola's first endurance sports car racer since the Lola T70. The British designer worked directly with Eric Broadley. The T600 was first introduced in 1981 and was the first Lola with a full-length monocoque. The car was designed to accommodate several different engine types such as Chevrolet, Porsche and Cosworth. The T600 won the first three races of the 1981 IMSA GT Championship season. After the T600 Thorby worked on the Lola 640E Formula Ford single seater. Julian Bailey won various races driving the T640E in the British Formula Ford Championship. After Thorby left Lola he joined the short lived Nimrod Racing Automobiles to work on the Aston Martin powered Nimrod NRA/C2. After leaving Nimrod Throby formed his own company, Amzel Ltd.

=== Formula 3 ===
Through his own company Thorby was hired to work for a variety of racing car constructors, mainly in Formula 3. Working with Martin Brigden and Kris Dwornik Thorby designed the first TOM'S Formula 3 car, the 031F. The 031F was competitive at first in the British F3 at the hands of Rickard Rydell. An uncompetitive engine prevented strong results later in the season. Paulo Carcasci won the All-Japan Formula 3 Championship in 1991 driving the 031F. For 1992 Thorby joined Ralt to design their RT36. The car was Ralt's first fully composite chassis. Marcel Albers was very successful in the Ralt winning the opening round of the 1992 British Formula Three season. However the season had a turn for the worse when Albers had a deadly crash at Thruxton Circuit. Fellow Ralt RT36 driver Philippe Adams finished second in the championship. In 1992 Thorby also helped Van Diemen develop the RF92. The car did not live up to the Van Diemen expectations. The car was first raced by Jason Plato and later by Julian Westwood in the British F3 scoring a couple of podium finishes.

In 1995 Thorby was again contracted by TOM'S to design a new Formula 3 car, the 035F. Thorby was partnered by F1 designer Martin Ogilvie. The car was never run in any championship. The cars successor, the 036F, had more success. Tom Coronel finished third in the Japanese F3 championship driving the car. Thorby's last involvement in Formula 3 came in 2004. Holzer Motorsport would enter Thorby designed Mygale's in the 2005 Formula 3 Euro Series season the deal however came never into fruition.

== Le Mans ==
In 1991 Thorby joined March Engineering to design the March 92S Le Mans Prototype. In collaboration with Nick Wirth's Simtek company the Judd powered car was developed. However when competition from Porsche and Jaguar emerged the project was put on hold. Thorby again designed an LMP car in 1996, the TOM's Toyota LMP. Tom Kristensen tested the car, but the car was never raced. A car that was raced at the 24 Hours of Le Mans was the Panoz LMP07. Technical difficulties prevented the car achieving notable results. A car designed by Thorby appeared at Le Mans in 2003, the Lister Storm LMP.

Year	Car	Class
1979	Lola T500	IndyCar
1981	Lola T600	Group C
1982	Lola T640E	Formula Ford
1991	TOM'S 031F	Formula 3
1991	March 92S	Le Mans Prototype
1992	Ralt RT36	Formula 3
1993	Van Diemen RF92	Formula 3
1995	Van Diemen RF95	Formula Ford
1995	TOM'S 035F	Formula 3
1996	TOM'S 036F	Formula 3
1996	TOM'S Toyota LMP	Le Mans Prototype
1998	Reynard 98E	Barber Pro Series
2000	Panoz LMP07	Le Mans Prototype
2003	Lister Storm LMP	Le Mans Prototype
2006	Mygale M-06	Formula 3
2009	Riversimple Hydrogen Car	experimental car
2010	McLaren MP4-12C	FIA GT3
