= 1982 24 Hours of Le Mans =

50th 24 Hours of Le Mans endurance race

Previous: 1981	Next: 1983
Index: Races | Winners

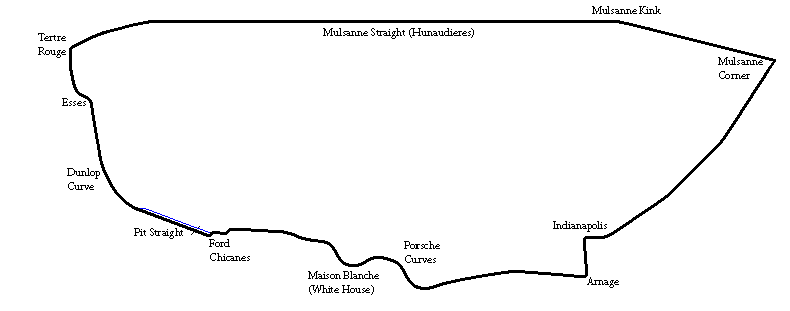
Le Mans in 1982

The 1982 24 Hours of Le Mans was the 50th Grand Prix of Endurance, which took place on 19 and 20 June 1982. It was also the fourth round of the 1982 World Endurance Championship. As well as a significant anniversary, this was a watershed year for Le Mans, with the highly anticipated advent of the FIA's Group C regulations, the essence of which was to allow an open engine formula but a minimum weight for safety and a proscribed fuel allocation.

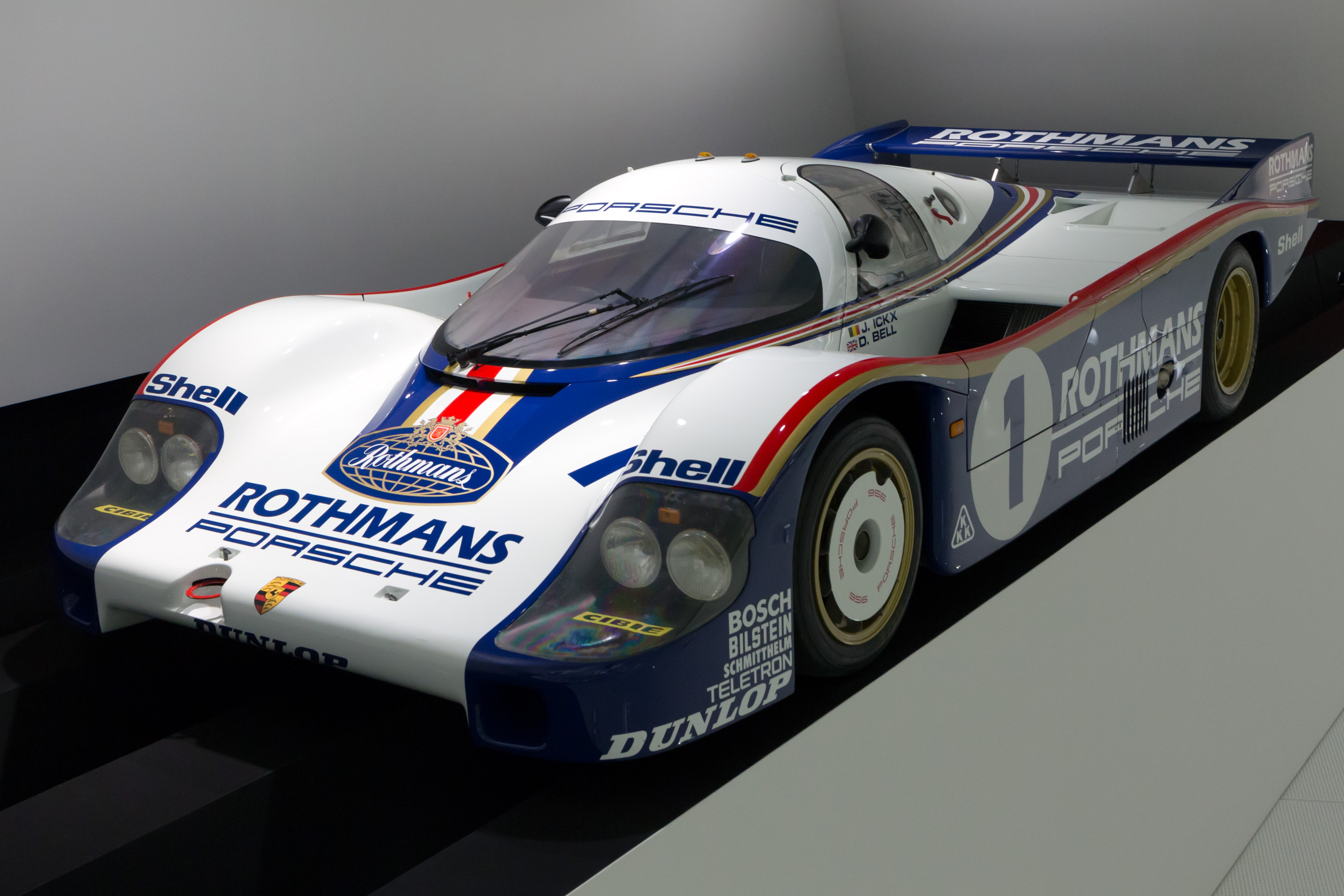
The winning Porsche 956 of Ickx and Bell

Despite Rondeau leading the championship, the Porsche works team arrived as clear favourites with their new 956. Their top driver pairing were the 1981 winners Jacky Ickx and Derek Bell. The better fuel economy of the Cosworth-engined Rondeau and Ford gave them the lead in the early hours, but then serious vibration issues in that engine started afflicting most of the teams and by early evening, the Porsches were running 1–2, that they maintained throughout the night as the competition fell away.

By dawn, the Porsche special of Joest Racing was established in third, which they held until ninety minutes from the end when the engine packed up, stranding Bob Wollek out on the track. Ickx and Bell had moved into the lead soon after midnight and kept it for the rest of the race, winning by three laps over their team-mates Jochen Mass and Vern Schuppan. In a race of unusual attrition, only eighteen cars were classified from the original 55 starters

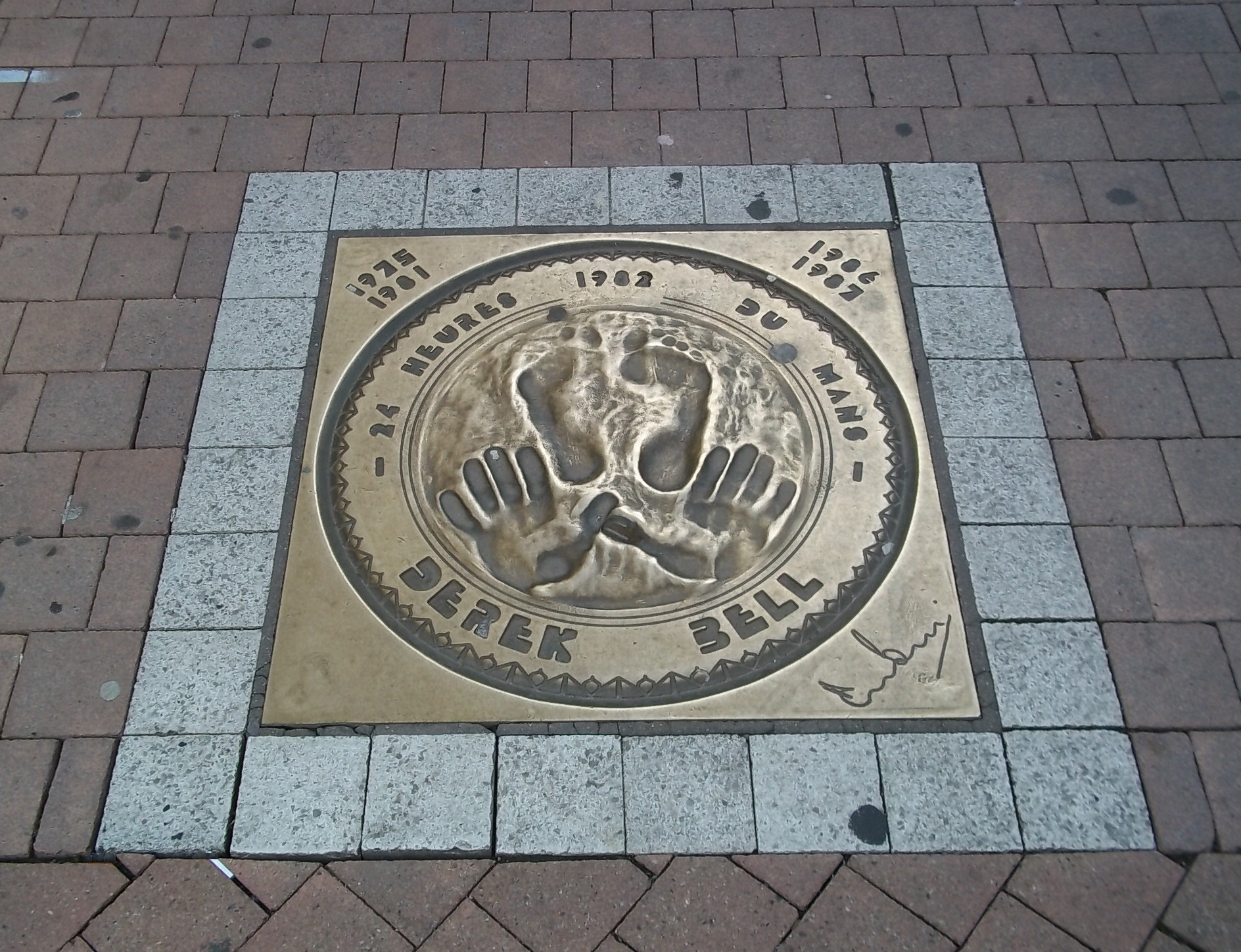
Le Mans walk of fame - Derek Bell

The win gave Ickx an unprecedented sixth outright victory, and Porsche had its most dominant race yet, sweeping the top five places, including a 1-2-3 for the works team.

== Regulations ==
This year saw the advent of the new Group C regulations – a formula essentially of open engine capacity but instead on weight and fuel consumption restrictions. The concept had been trialled by the Automobile Club de l'Ouest (ACO) in the 1975 race, based on ideas proposed by Belgian racing journalist, engineer and 1960 Le Mans winner Paul Frère. At the time it was derided by the press as the “fuel-economy race”. But it would go some way to negate the predominance of the turbo engines, despite the x1.4 modifier to capacity. The two-seater cars would have a maximum amount of fuel available in a race so there had to be a trade-off between more power from bigger engines, the heavy fuel consumption of high-boost turbo engines and the fuel-efficiency of smaller, lighter cars. A minimum weight of 800 kg was put in to maintain structural safety and there were defined dimensions of 100 cm minimum height, maximum 200 cm width and 480 cm length. These dimensions mirrored those of the ACO's GTP regulations. There was also a compulsory 100x80 cm flat floor area required between the axles to try to limit the undertray "ground-effects" performance enhancements. Fuel tanks were a maximum of 100 litres capacity and no more than 25 fuel stops were allowed in the race for each car – a maximum of 2600 litres from the start. The windscreen regulations were such that the drag effect would almost guarantee that any car would need to have a closed-bodyshell and not open-top.

Unlike other races in the championship run to a set distance, where teams could calculate their required fuel economy, the open-ended nature of Le Mans would require prudent fuel management. Going on the previous year's winning run by Jacky Ickx and Derek Bell of 4825 km (just under 3000 miles) using this year's maximum 2600 litres of fuel would require a fuel economy of 54 litres per 100 km. This was at odds with the IMSA regulations, that instead used a sliding weight-scale to balance engine capacity. This then precluded the Daytona and Sebring endurance rounds from the World Championship.

With Group C taking over, it made the Group 6 and Le Mans GTP classes redundant. Group B would supersede the Group 4 and Group 5 GT classes.

== Entries ==
Whereas other races in the World Championship needed their fields bolstered by Group 6 cars “grandfathered” into the entry list, the Le Mans list had very strong support for the new Group C with 33 entries, coming from a wide variety of manufacturers and racing specialists. There were factory teams from Porsche, Ford, Lancia and Mazda; with racecar builders Lola, March and Rondeau bringing works cars. Finally a raft of small privateer specialists brought their own Group C designs. These amounted to 30 "works" entries, the most seen at Le Mans for many years.

However, as an interim year, to complete the field the ACO accepted entries from IMSA in the GTX and GTO categories, and had limited spaces for the former FIA classes.

Class	Large-engines >2.0L classes	Medium-engines <2.0L classes	Turbo engines
Group C	33 / 28	-	7 / 7
Group B	1 / 0	-	1 / 0
Group 6 S Sports	-	6 / 3	3 / 2
Group 5 SP Special Production	5 / 4	2 / 2	6 / 5
Group 4 GTS Special GT	1 / 1	-	1 / 1
IMSA GTX	12 / 11	-	4 / 4
IMSA GTO	6 / 6	-	3 / 3
Total Entries	58 / 50	8 / 5	25 / 22

- Note: The first number is the number of arrivals, the second the number who started.

=== Group C ===
After the triumphant debut last year of its 2649cc turbo engine, Porsche immediately started on the development of its new Group C car: the Porsche 956 under its technical director Norbert Singer. The flat-six, four-valve engine had a combined air-cooled block, and water-cooled heads. For qualifying, at 1.2-bar boost, it would generate 615 bhp, wound down to 1.1-bar (580 bhp) for race-pace and fuel economy. The aluminium hull was Porsche's first monocoque chassis, and with assistance from Dornier, had its aerodynamics tested in a wind-tunnel. This led to the engine being tilted at an angle. Also the company's first ground-effect car, the langheck version generated over three times as much downforce as the Porsche 917 model from a decade earlier. A completely new 5-speed gearbox was installed, replacing the CanAm 4-speed 'box used the year before. The project took only 9 months and in March, test driver Jürgen Barth was doing track runs and its first outing was at the Silverstone round. The team was nervous on fuel consumption if the competition chose to push them to race to keep up. The team had a computer in the pits and digital flow meters in the cars to give them an edge in calculating the fuel consumption. Three cars were ready just in time, run by new team manager Peter Falk. Jacky Ickx was back out of retirement and a full-time works driver again with Derek Bell as his co-driver. The second car had Jochen Mass and Vern Schuppan while the one-off third car had Barth, Hurley Haywood and Al Holbert.

Ford was the other bulk manufacturer to take on Porsche. The new C100 model (named as it would be 100 cm high) was based on an aluminium monocoque design from Len Bailey. The first chassis was built by Hesketh Engineering while Alain de Cadenet got two more made, debuting at Brands Hatch in 1981. The project was then transferred to Ford Deutschland, working with the German Zakspeed racing team. Ford had engaged with Cosworth, to develop the famous DFV 3-litre Formula 1 engine for the car. Two versions of the new DFL V8 came out: a 3.3-litre and a 540 bhp 3.96-litre model. It was the latter that was put into the C100. Two cars were entered with Manfred Winkelhock and Klaus Niedzwiedz in one of the De Cadenet chassis, while a new Zakspeed chassis (with design updates by Tony Southgate dropping 40 kg) was assigned to Marc Surer and Klaus Ludwig.

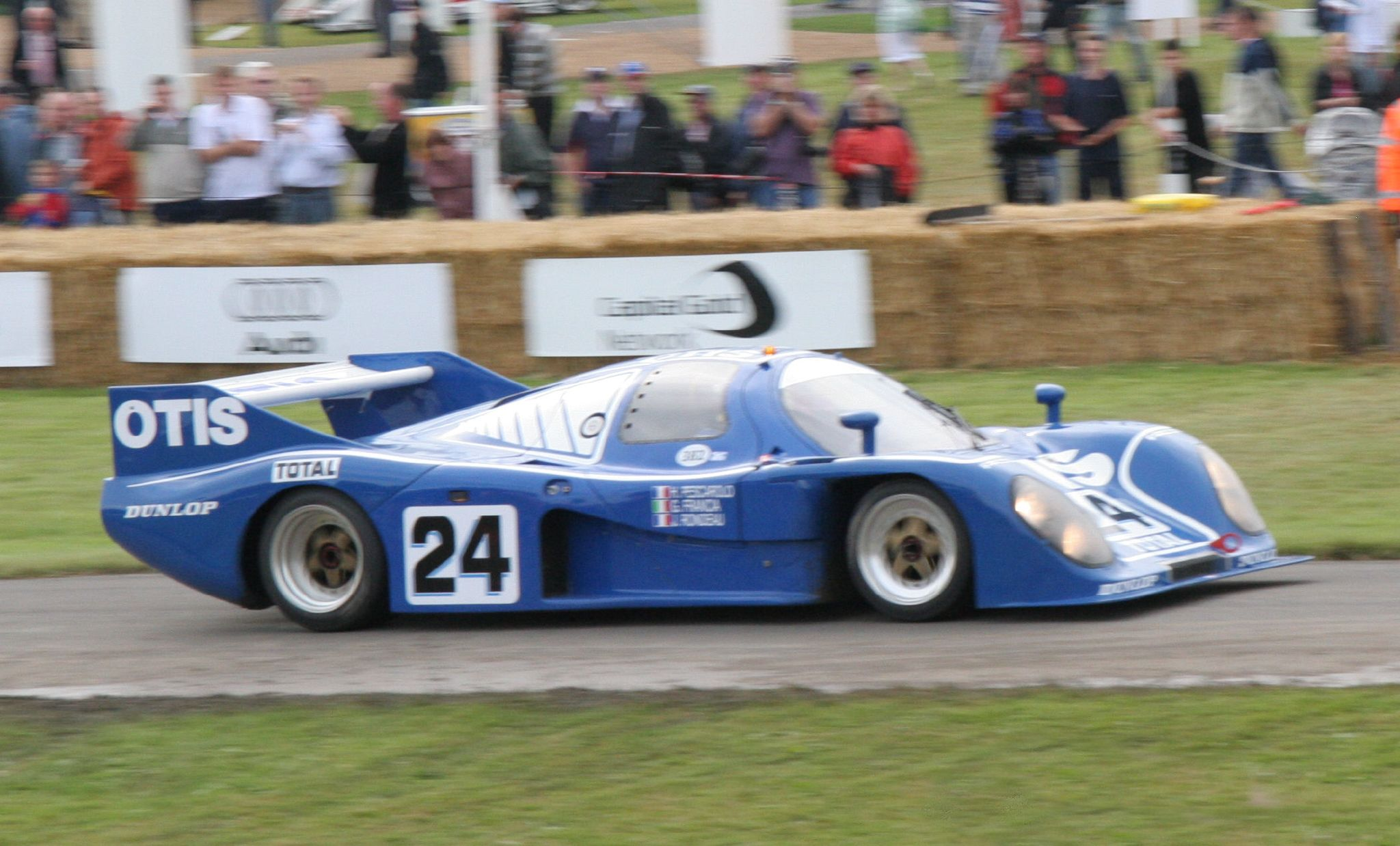
Rondeau M382

The fortunes of Le Mans local Jean Rondeau had taken a big upward turn, selling several vehicles to customers. This enabled development of a Group C ground-effect car, the M482, and embarking on a full WEC season. Until ready, the team adapted the existing design to Group C spec, as the M382. They had the best possible start, winning the opening round at Monza with an updated M379C car, and came into the race as the leader in the championship. For Le Mans, three of the M382s were prepared, fitted with the bigger Cosworth DFL: the race-winning chassis would be driven by François Migault, Gordon Spice and Xavier Lapeyre. The premier car had Henri Pescarolo and Jean-Pierre Jaussaud (with five wins between them) while the third car had Rondeau himself with rally-specialist Jean Ragnotti. There were also three customer Rondeaux; Christian Bussi had an M382 with a 3.3-litre DFL, while those of Pierre Yver and former team-driver Jacky Haran were older M379Cs with 3-litre DFV engines.

The small WM team also looked at running a WEC campaign, under the Secateva racing team set up by WM driver Roger Dorchy. Peugeot further developed the PRV engine, now up to 2850cc and putting out 540 bhp. But the fuel consumption of the twin-turbo engine had proven problematic in the early races. The new P82 had the drivetrain lowered to improve the centre of gravity and handling and could get up to 350 kp/h (220 mph) . Unlike all the other Group C cars the WMs were significantly smaller than the maximum dimensions and so had a far smaller frontal area that gave them their higher speed. Two cars were entered, with Dorchy and Guy Fréquelin in one and Jean-Daniel Raulet and Didier Theys in the other. Much like at WM, some of the R&D team at Mercedes-Benz got involved in Group C racing as a sideline. Swiss engineer Peter Sauber was working with composite-technology company Seger & Hoffmann, stepping up from their BMW M1 collaboration to Group C. They contacted the Mercedes technicians to develop their chassis design and aerodynamics. The resultant SHS C6 was fitted with a 3.96-litre Cosworth tuned by Heini Mader who got it to 540 bhp. Two were built, and sold to Gerhard Schneider (who had bought a Sauber-tuned M1) and Swiss slot-machine magnate Walter Brun. Both cars would be managed for the race by Schneider's GS Sport racing team. Brun drove his car with Siegfried Muller Jr, while the other had team-regular Hans-Joachim Stuck joined by Jean-Louis Schlesser and Dieter Quester.

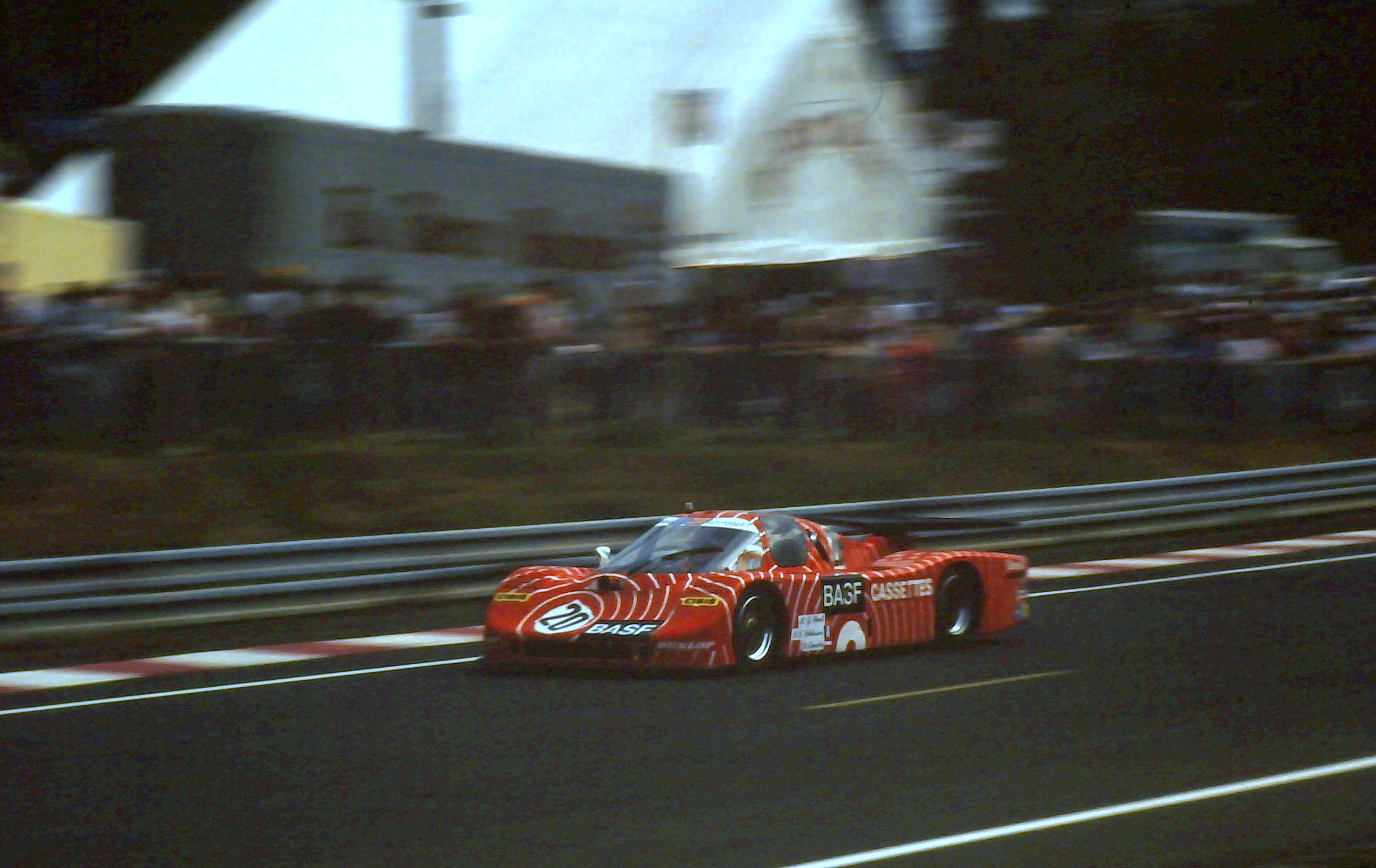
Sauber SHS C6 of Stuck/Schlesser/Quester

With the Porsche 956 not available for customer sale until the next year, both Joest and Kremer were given copies of the Porsche 936 factory plans to build their own replica versions. Reinhold Joest fitted the new 936CJ with a 2.5-litre turbo engine, and ran it alongside the older 936/77, to give Bob Wollek the DRM championship. Purchased by the Belgian Martin brothers, they ran it in the WEC with Wollek, with their red and white Belga tobacco sponsorship. After they got a third at Silverstone, Philippe Martin crashed the car heavily at Nürburgring. The rebuild gave the engineers the chance to fit a long tail and low-drag nose for the circuit. The Kremer brothers' Porsche replica, the C-K5, had a 936 frame fitted with their own Kevlar-blended sharkfin chassis and had the transaxle and rear suspension from their previous year's unsuccessful 917 project. It was fitted with their 2.3-litre twin-turbo flat-six engine and was capable of reaching 330 kp/h (205 mph). But finished at the last minute there had been no time for track-testing. They continued the productive relationship with Ted Field's Interscope Racing, and his regular driver Danny Ongais, along with the Kremer's 1979 Le Mans winner, Bill Whittington.

Lola Cars, after initial trials with the T600, set about building its successor for Group C, the T610. It had a purpose-built honeycomb monocoque for the Cosworth DFL engine and a chassis made of carbon-fibre and Kevlar. Aerodynamics were fine tuned in the Williams F1 wind tunnel at Didcot. This gave it a top speed around 345 kp/h (215 mph). The works car was driven by Guy Edwards, Rupert Keegan and Nick Faure, while the American Kent-Cooke car had Brian Redman and Jim Adams with him. The Grand Touring Cars team had last brought their Mirage cars to Le Mans in 1979. They brought a new model, the M12. Designed and built by John Horsman, who had worked with John Wyer on the original models, and Howden Ganley at Tiga Race Cars. Two chassis were built, tested at the Lockheed wind tunnel in Atlanta and road-tested at Riverside. Equipped with the 3.9-litre Cosworth, they could reach 340 kp/h (210 mph). Time ran out to get both cars ready, so only one was shipped to France to be run by Mario Andretti (who had last raced there in 1967) and his 19-year-old son Michael.

March Engineering was already making an impact in the American single-seater CART series. It entered Group C picking up the BMW M1C design targeted for the IMSA competition. That car was substantially reworked by Adrian Newey to be able to accommodate any engine into its monocoque chasses. The first choice was a Chevrolet 'small-block' 5.8-litre V8, which put out 550 bhp. The first chassis was bought by Bob Garretson as GTP-spec, and had performed well in America. Bobby Rahal and Jim Trueman had finished second at Sebring and were joined by Skeeter McKitterick. Two more chassis were sold to American teams while the fourth chassis was entered by the works team for Le Mans, to be driver by Eje Elgh, Patrick Nève and Jeff Wood. The new Group C model by Dome was the RL82. Built by March, it had the 3.3-litre DFL engine and new brakes, but no longer had the distinct wedge-shape of the previous models. This year, regular team driver Chris Craft had former March F1 driver Eliseo Salazar.

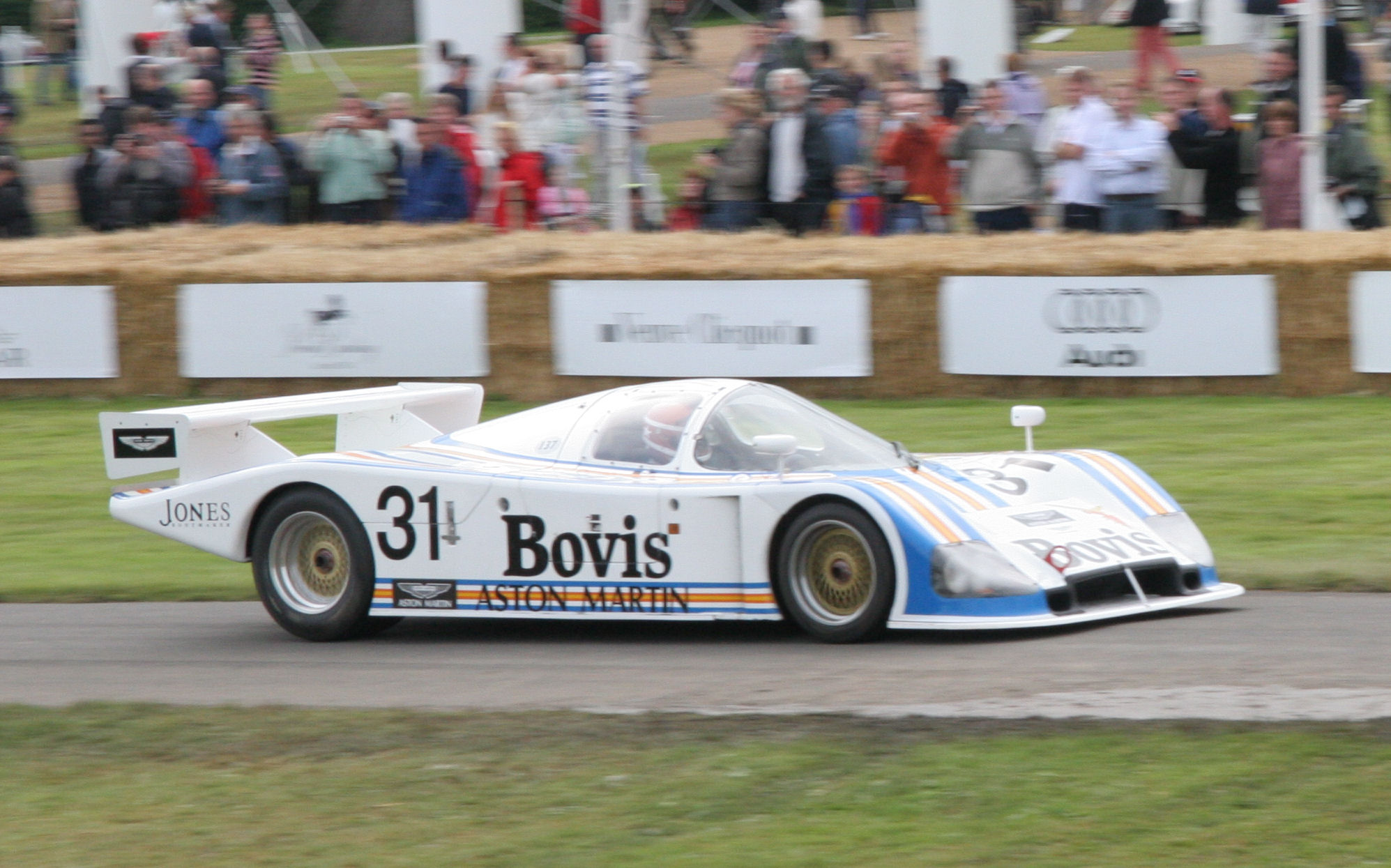
Nimrod NRAC2

Nimrod Racing Automobiles had been formed in 1981 by Englishman Robin Hamilton and Aston Martin chairman Victor Gauntlett to build a Group C competitor based on an Aston Martin engine. Hamilton had previously run his own modified Aston Martin V8 Vantage at Le Mans, with poor results. They took the T385 design from Eric Broadley at Lola, and built it on an aluminium hull. It was fitted with a fuel-injected Aston Martin 5.3-litre V8. Tuned by Aston's in-house team, Tickford Engineering, it put out 570 bhp and could get up to 320 kp/h (200 mph). But at 1050 kg, it was easily the heaviest of the Group C cars. Two chassis were built and one sold to Viscount Downe (an Aston Martin shareholder). The works car had Geoff Lees, Tiff Needell and Bob Evans, while the Viscount's car had Ray Mallock, Mike Salmon and Simon Phillips. The 'privateer' car was sponsored by Aston Martin saviour Victor Gauntlett's company Pace Petroleum.

Inspired by the achievements of Jean Rondeau, fellow Le Mans resident Yves Courage decided to build his own Group C car. The Cougar C01 had an aluminium monocoque from the same company supplying Rondeau. The chassis was designed by former Ligier and Renault engineer Jean-Yves Charles, and it was fitted with a 3.3-litre Cosworth DFL tuned by Swiss engine-specialist Heini Mader. The previous year he had raced with Jean-Philippe Grand, an agent for Primagaz and they teamed up again with Primagaz sponsorship along with Michel Dubois as the third driver. The GRID team (Giuseppe Risi and Ian Dawson) had latterly run the Lola works program. This year they developed their own Group C car with a design by Geoff Aldridge, who had worked on the revolutionary ground-effects Lotus 79 with Colin Chapman. The S1 had a Kevlar and carbonfibre with a 3.3-litre Cosworth DFL. Emilio de Villota ran WEC races with David Hobbs. To run with de Villota at Le Mans, Dawson brought on board Alain de Cadenet and Desiré Wilson. De Cadenet had given up on his own racing projects and had a 3.9-litre DFL for his prospective C100 that he offered. But even with that the car could only just reach 290 kp/h (185 mph). François Duret had bought an old De Cadenet-Lola, and, with Ian Harrower's ADA Engineering, fashioned a new Group C-compliant bodyshell. But kitted out with an underpowered 3-litre Cosworth DFV, it could only reach 320 kp/h (199 mph). German Ernst Ungar had been building sportscars since 1973, and this year Ungar Racing Development built two cars for Jürgen Kannacher to run in the Interserie and DRM. The C81 was built around the BMW M1's 3.5-litre engine. Prepared by the Schnitzer Motorsport team, it put out 480 bhp that could get the car up to 305 kp/h (190 mph). His experience with building hill-climb specials meant it was quite light.

=== Group 6 (2-litre) ===
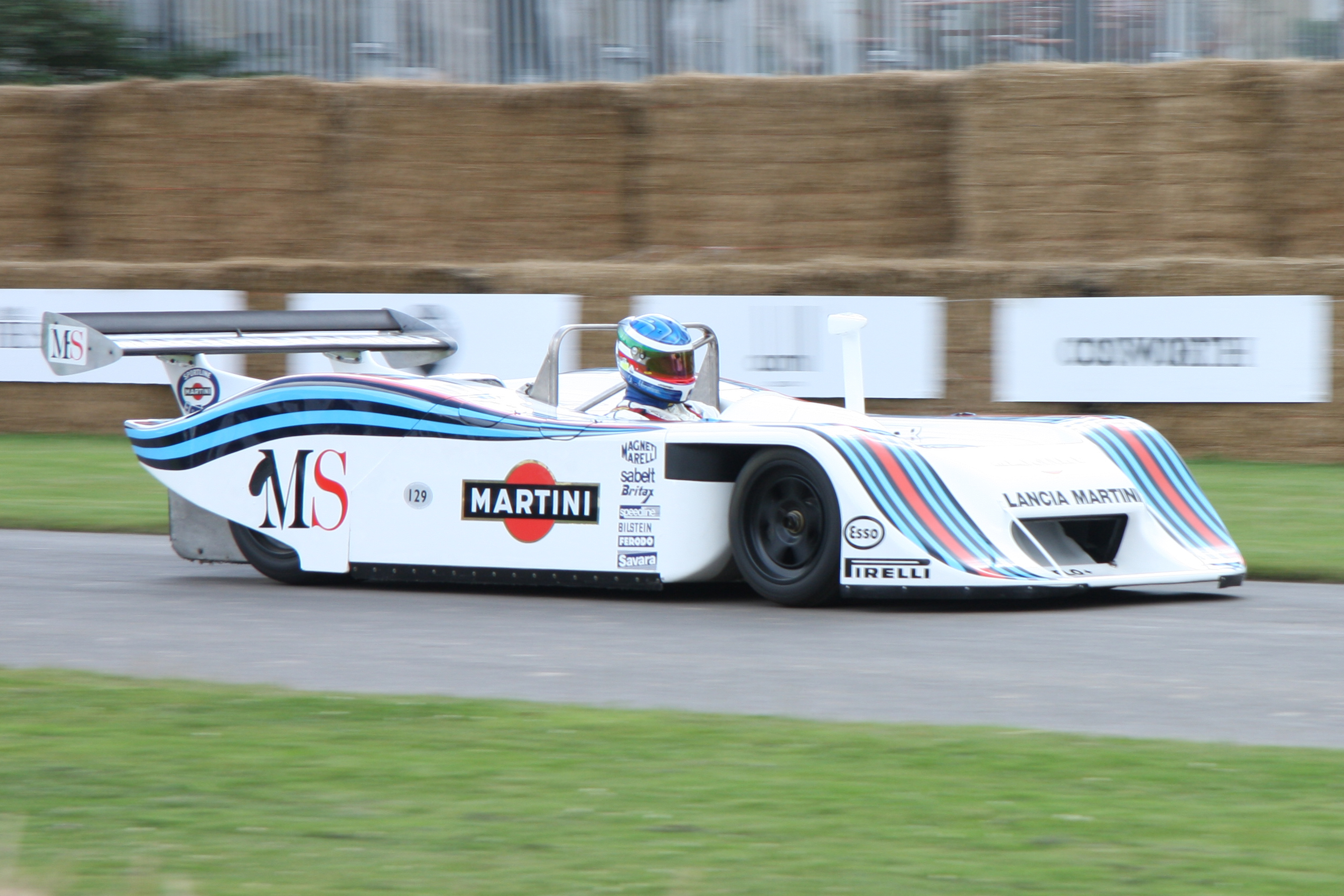
Lancia LC1

Although the large Group 6 cars had been superseded by Group C, the FIA allowed the 2-litre cars entry to help keep the fields up (and did not prevent new models from entering). They would not count points towards the Manufacturer's Championship, but could to the Driver's title. Ever the opportunists, Lancia produced a new, open-top car for the Group 6 class. The Lancia LC1 had a chassis built by Dallara, with skirts and ground effects (both banned in Group C). It was fitted with the same 1425cc turbo-engine that was in their Group 5 Beta Montecarlo, which was now tuned to put out 440 bhp. Without the weight limitations or fuel restrictions of Group C it could still reach 300 kp/h (185 mph) and was a genuine contender, having won two of the three rounds outright. However, many in autosport saw it as a cynical exploitation of the rules. The Martini team brought back their regular Formula One drivers for the race: Michele Alboreto and Teo Fabi with Rolf Stommelen and Riccardo Patrese and Piercarlo Ghinzani with Hans Heyer.

Through the late 1970s the 2-litre class had been predominantly made up of fields of Lolas and Chevrons. After the death of Chevron's founder, Derek Bennett in 1978, the company had struggled. A consortium of enthusiasts and drivers, including Martin Birrane, were trying to restore the brand. Birrane entered a B36, equipped with a Cosworth BDX engine, as a works entry. His co-drivers were John Sheldon and Neil Crang. The six-year-old design would always struggle against the brand-new Lancias.

=== Group 5 ===
With Group 5 being phased out, the over and under 2-litre divisions were merged into a reduced class this year. It was dominated by four Porsche 935s. Dieter Schornstein's Vegla team again worked with Reinhold Joest to run their 935J, while Kremer-kit cars were entered by German Edgar Dören and last year's class winner, Charles Ivey Engineering. The fourth car was Claude Haldi's four-year old 934/5.

Against the Porsches there was limited opposition. The only BMW this year came from Hugues de Chaunac's French ORECA team. The Scuderia Sivama di Galliate had bought a pair of Lancia Montecarlos from the factory, to by run in the WEC by the Scuderia Vesuvio team of Daniele Audetto. For Le Mans, they worked with the race-entries of two French privateer regulars, Thierry Perrier and Jean-Marie Lemerle who would share the driving with the Scuderia drivers.

=== IMSA GTX ===
There was a strong field in the GTX class, with Porsches, Ferraris, Mazdas and BMW all entered. This year the Joest workshop had produced two replicas of the Porsche 935/78 (colloquially known as "Moby Dick"), using plans supplied by the works factory. One of the distinctive long-tail models was sold to Gianpiero Moretti's Momo Racing, while the other went to John Fitzpatrick with its race-debut at Le Mans, with co-driver David Hobbs. Team manager Tim Schenken had a Joest 2.6-litre engine to fit for race. Two Kremer 935/K3s were entered by the American teams of Bob Garretson and Ralph Kent-Cooke. Both had 3.2-litre engines for qualifying, before being changed over to the fuel-efficient 2.8-litre version for the race.

Bob Akin's team had developed their own variation on the Porsche 935, which debuted at Le Mans. Unusually, it had a bonded and riveted alloy monocoque. The silhouette bodyshell took the shovel nose from a Lola T600. Unfortunately the build was finished late and it had to be shipped to France direct without any shake-down testing. A 3.2-litre engine would be used for qualifying, with an alternative 2.8-litre, trimmed down to 2670cc and 630 bhp. But it was also the heaviest car in the race, at a hefty 1150 kg

Four Ferraris were lined up against the Porsches. Two were run by the North American Racing Team, with Alain Cudini and Preston Henn as lead drivers, along with Ron Spangler's Prancing Horse Farm team with Pierre Dieudonné, while the fourth was French Ferrari-agent Charles Pozzi, who had his regular team drivers Claude Ballot-Léna and Jean-Claude Andruet.

Mazdaspeed was still preparing its Group C project, so in the interim worked with the Mooncraft company to develop the RX-7. The uprated RX-7 254i was more aerodynamic and its twin-rotaries could put out 320 bhp to reach 275 kp/h (170 mph) Cars were prepared for European racing by Tom Walkinshaw Racing. Walkinshaw led one car while works driver Yojiro Terada led the other. This year, Steve O'Rourke's EMKA team switched the BMW from Group 5 to the GTX class. O'Rourke was also manager of Pink Floyd and the band's drummer Nick Mason joined him as a co-driver.

=== IMSA GTO, Group 4 and Group B ===
The Brumos Racing team of Peter Gregg had been dominant in American sports-car racing through the 1970s. After the death of Gregg in 1980, his wife Deborah took over running the team. She arranged a deal with tyre-manufacturer BFGoodrich to enter a pair of the homologated Porsche 924s with the new 2008cc turbo engine. Although using Dunlops to qualify, the intention was to race the high-performance road tyre. One car had Americans Jim Busby and "Doc" Bundy, while the other had Manfred Schurti, Patrick Bedard and Paul Miller. A third Porsche, with the older 1984cc engine, was entered by Richard Lloyd and had achieved a very good 5th place overall at the Nürburgring round. For Le Mans his co-driver would be Andy Rouse.

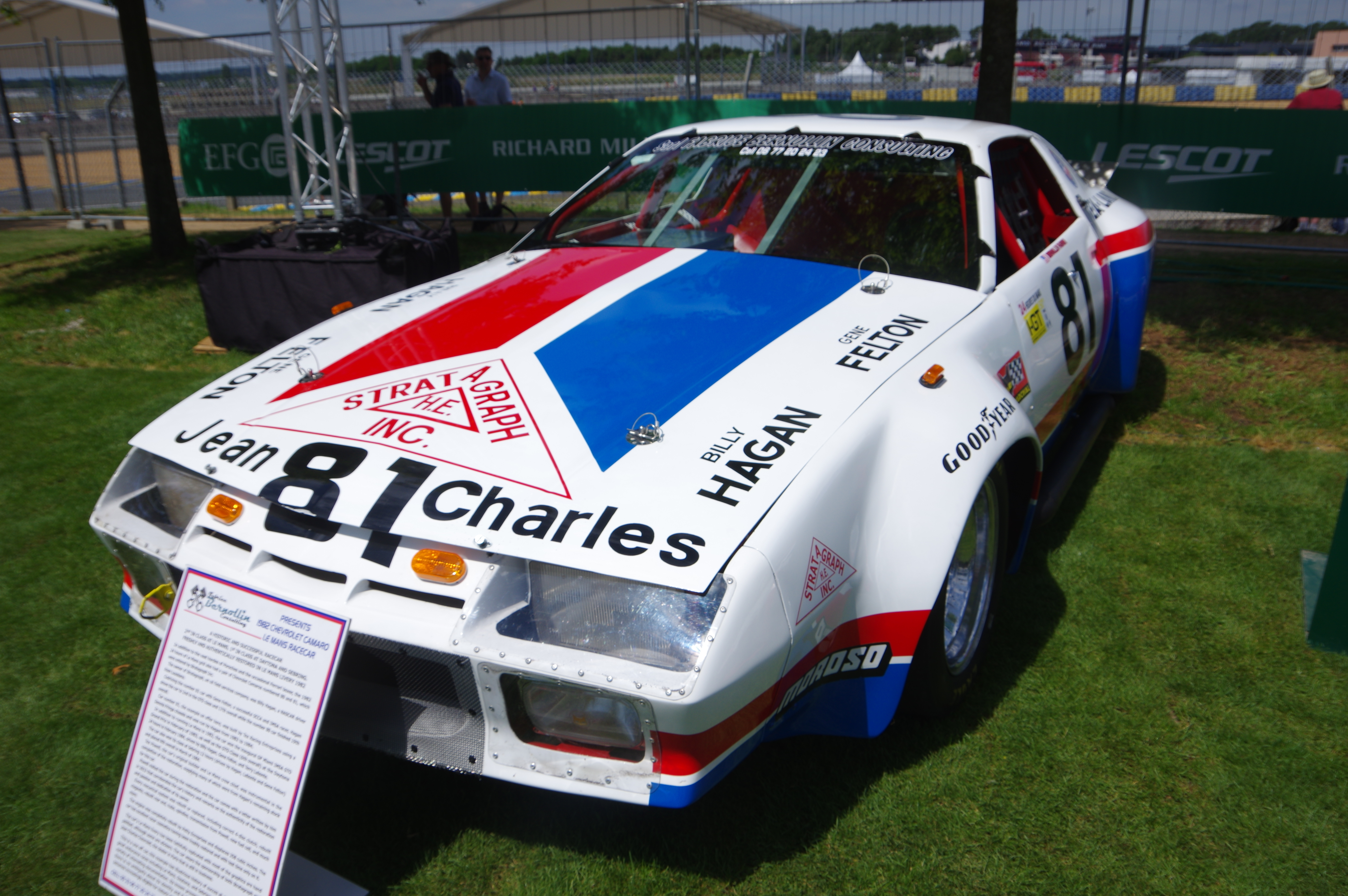
Stratagraph Camaro

Despite a disappointing run the previous year, Billy Hagan's Stratagraph team returned with two big Chevrolet Camaros. Both cars were given smaller engines and front and rear disc brakes. Last year's car (with a 5.7L V8) was an aerodynamic nose and high rear aerofoil. It was raced by NASCAR veterans Dick Brooks and Hershel McGriff. Hagan's car had the 5.4L V8 detuned to 570 bhp and had regular racing bodywork.

There was only a single entrant in both the Group B and Group 4 classes, and both were Porsche 911 variants. French privateer Alain Gadal had a 3.3-litre turbo Porsche 911 Turbo (930) while Richard Cleare had a 3-litre Porsche 934 turbo in the GT class.

The maximum speeds recorded on the Hunaudières speedtrap

Car	Driver	Engine	Power Output	Max. Speed (km/h)	Max. Speed (mph)	Weight (kg)
Porsche 956	#1 Jacky Ickx	Porsche 935/76 2649cc F6 twin-turbo	615 bhp	355	221	858
Lola T610	#16 Edwards / Keegan	Cosworth DFL 3955cc V8	540 bhp	353	220	885
WM P82	#9 Theys / Pignard	Peugeot PRV 2850cc V6 twin-turbo	540 bhp	349	217	824
Dome RC82	#36 Chris Craft	Cosworth DFL 3298cc V8		344	214	903
Mirage M12	#27 Mario Andretti	Cosworth DFL 3955cc V8	540 bhp	341	212	936
Porsche 935-L1	#76 Akin / Miller / Cowart	Porsche 2670cc F6 turbo		337	210	1154
Cougar C01	#35 Courage / Grand / Dubois	Cosworth DFL 3298cc V8		335	208	876
Porsche C-K5	#5 Danny Ongais	Porsche 2344cc F6 turbo		333	207	877
Rondeau M382	#24 Henri Pescarolo	Cosworth DFL 3955cc V8	540 bhp	331	206	807
Ford C100	#6 Klaus Ludwig	Cosworth DFL 3955cc V8	540 bhp	328	204	871
Sauber SHS C6	#20 Hans-Joachim Stuck	Cosworth DFL 3955cc V8	540 bhp	327	203	863
March 82G	#14 Nève / Elgh	Chevrolet 5835cc V8	570 bhp	322	200	895
Nimrod NRA/C2	#31 Geoff Lees	Aston Martin 5340cc V8	570 bhp	321	199	1047
Lancia LC1	#51 Michele Alboreto	Lancia 1425cc S4 turbo	440 bhp	301	187	703
Porsche 924 Carrera GTR	#86 Manfred Schurti	Porsche 2008cc S4 turbo		299	186	1077
Mazda RX-7 254i	#83 Walkinshaw / Lovett	Mazda 13B 1308cc twin-rotary	320 bhp	274	170	960

== Practice and Qualifying ==
Overall, the weather was good for the two four-hour qualifying sessions, aside from losing the last half-hour because of a short, sharp thunderstorm. A new feature this year, was an additional 45-minute warm-up on the Saturday morning, as a last chance to shake down any engine changes or adjustments after the practice sessions. Once again, Jacky Ickx stamped his authority over the rest of the field with the fastest qualifying lap early in the first of the two practice sessions, and posting the highest speed down the Hunaudières straight. The 355 km/h (221 mph) was a bit slower than his car the previous year, but the better handling gave a faster overall lap-time (3:28.4). Teammate Jochen Mass was almost a second behind, with Bob Wollek another second further back in third. The two Lancias were next – Patrese arrived with only an hour left in the second session after a delayed flight from Venice, but only needed two laps in the car to qualify within the 125% rule before the rain stopped the session. Klaus Ludwig was the fastest Ford driver putting his car sixth on the grid (3:32.5), followed by Stuck's Sauber, the Kremer-Porsche and the Andretti Mirage in ninth. Although very fast in a straight line, the Lola could only manage tenth place (3:38.0) and almost ten seconds behind Ickx. The Rondeau team had a dismal practice with fuel pick-up and electrical issues, with Migault getting their best time of 3:40.7 to qualify fifteenth. Although the works Nimrod was 25 kp/h faster than its stablemate, its poorer balance meant it handled badly and was actually two seconds slower overall (3:48.2 for 25th). The Dome was very quick, but the new brake system did not work well and had to be replaced. They had only qualified 19th, and then Salazar had a big moment on the Saturday morning when a rear tyre blew at full speed on the Mulsanne. A temporary repair got it onto the grid in time. A similar issue had struck the favoured Vegla 935 earlier with a more serious result. The tyre blew just after the Mulsanne kink as Harald Grohs was travelling at 300 kp/h. He skated off the road, hitting the barriers on both sides then going into a wild series of rolls. The wrecked car then caught fire, but amazingly, Grohs was shaken but uninjured, and aided in a quick escape as the door had been torn off in the mayhem. Another unlucky entrant was Richard Lloyd whose Porsche 924 failed to qualify for the second year in succession, this time foiled by broken pistons on two engines, the second supplied directly from the Porsche factory.

This year the IMSA cars were off the pace of the new Group C. The fastest Porsche 935 was Edgar Dören's Group 5 Kremer car in 18th (3:44.1). John Fitzpatrick's Joest special was a disappointing 26th (3:48.5) while the quickest Ferrari was the NART car with 3:54.1 (36th), outpaced by Bill Hagan's thundering Camaro in 32nd (3:52.6). After the end of qualification, a number of the top teams swapped out their engines for lower-tuned and smaller-capacity engines in the aim of improving their fuel economy for the race. On raceday morning, the Porsche team found another problem with the Ickx and Bell engine, and they took the precaution of changing the engine again – Bell considered they now had the team's 7th-string engine. The Pescarolo/Jaussaud team left it very late: after the Saturday morning warm-up, a fuel system problem forced them to do a five-hour full engine change in a fraction of that time, finishing just ten minutes before the deadline.

== Race ==
=== Start ===
Race-day was sunny and warm, drawing a huge crowd of 250,000. This year, the honorary starter was Luigi Chinetti, three-time Le Mans winner and founder of the North American Racing Team. The fiftieth anniversary celebrations included a grand parade of classic Le Mans cars, including the Chenard-Walcker, inaugural winner in 1923, a Bentley Speed Six, Jaguars and Ferraris. There was drama before the cars started with the Andretti Mirage being disqualified on a technicality. A random check by an official had found the gearbox oil cooler mounted 10 cm behind the gearbox (nominally an unsafe position), something that had been missed in the initial scrutineering. Mario was furious, after a start-line debacle that finished his Indianapolis 500 before it began in May. Although the mechanics could make the necessary modifications, the decision was final and Richard Lloyd, as first reserve, was given fifteen minutes' notice to get his car on the grid.

Ickx and Mass took to the front from the start with a hot pace, chased hard by the Rondeaux of Migault and Jaussaud, Stuck's Sauber and Ludwig in the Ford. Both works Lancias were immediately in trouble with faulty fuel pumps and in the first two laps both cars stopped on-track for running repairs, taking an hour each to get back to the pits. They rejoined the race at the tail of the field, many laps down. The Dome and Brun's Sauber also pitted early, while Revson's Lola could not get started and was left on the grid. Pescarolo came in on lap 7 to spend 40 minutes tracking down an electrical issue in his Rondeau. The first retirement, within the first half-hour, was the Grid-Plaza with piston failure. After running well within the top-20, the Cougar broke its suspension (as had happened at the Nürburgring) and lost an hour in the pits. It had yet another suspension failure early on Sunday morning that led to its retirement.

Mass led initially, pursued by the WM of Pignard. Ickx had dropped back to let the sprinters get away, until gradually picking them off and taking the lead on lap nine. The thirstier Nimrods and Porsches had to pit first, after only 47 minutes, so it was Migault credited with the lead at the first hour, ahead of Niedzwiedz, Rondeau and Stuck. Keegan, in the Ultramar Lola, was running a strong sixth, splitting the three Porsches, until he had to stop to have a loose door secured. Pignard had handed over to Raulet in the 9th-placed WM, but the sister car would lose over half an hour in the pits after Dorchy tangled with Bussi's spinning Rondeau while trying to lap him. Jean Rondeau put in the fastest lap of the race in the early evening as he kept up with the Porsches, trying to push their turbo-engine fuel consumption. The fuel limitations caused early issues as teams miscalculated their consumption. First victim was Bob Akin's high-powered Porsche 935. Then Ralph Kent-Cooke ran the Lola dry from over-consumption caused by a storming run through the field after their bad start.

At 7.35pm, British hopes took a dive when a slow puncture blew a tyre on Tiff Needell's works Nimrod while he was running ninth and travelling at top speed on the back straight. Fishtailing down the road, he eventually spun and crashed at 320 kp/h (200 mph) backwards into the barriers at Mulsanne corner. Fortunately Needell was not injured. A course car was sent out to the accident. Unfortunately, the pit officials thought it was a pace-car and held up cars, causing Muller (Sauber), Stommelen (Lancia), Hobbs (935) and the Cougar to lose two laps as they waited and waited to be released from the pits.

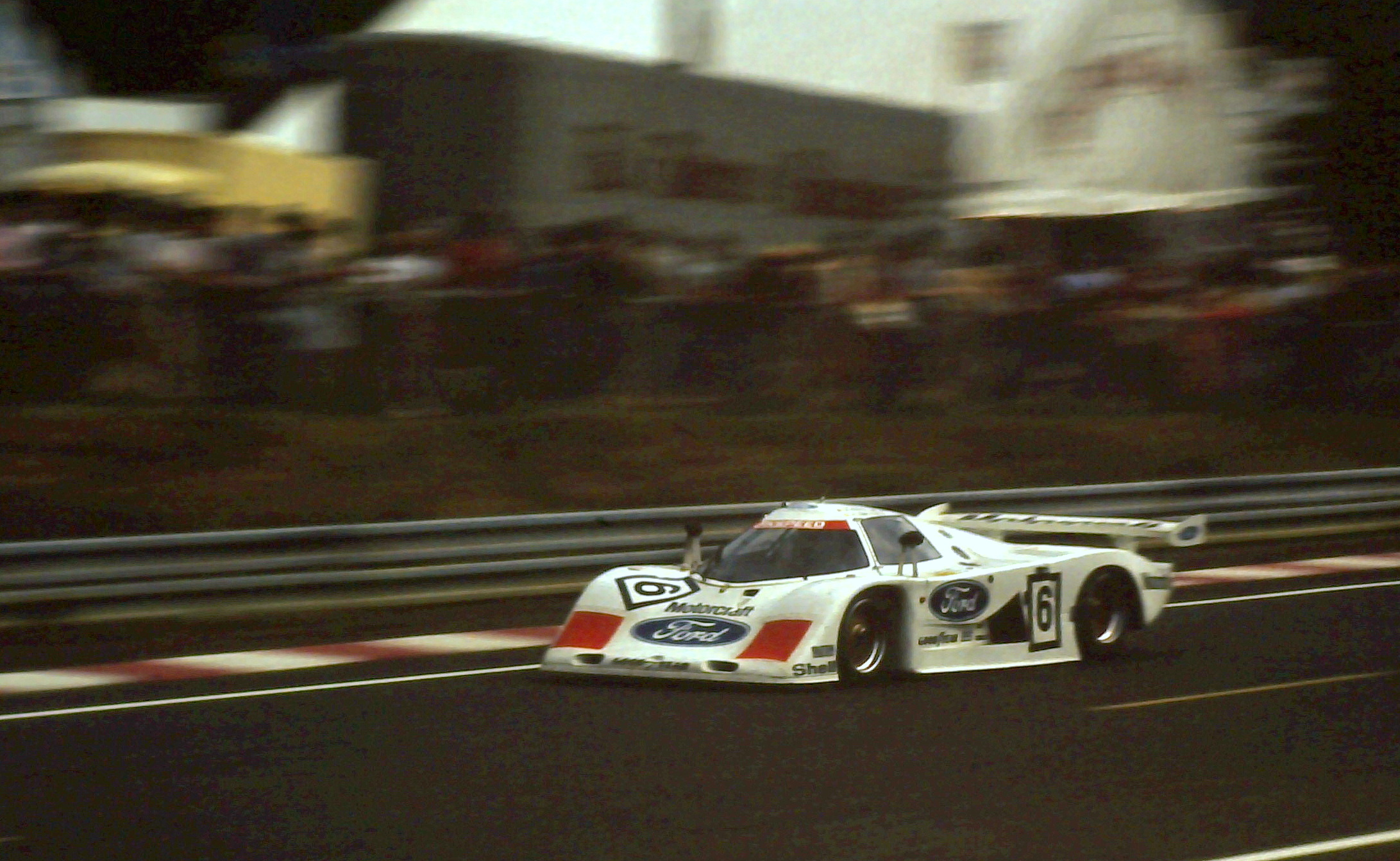
Early challenger for the lead: the Ludwig/Surer Ford C100

At the four-hour mark, Winkelhock led in the Ford with the Holbert/Haywood/Barth Porsche second (61). A lap back were Bell (Porsche), Spice (Rondeau), Surer in the other Ford, Raulet's WM, Schlesser (Sauber) and the Joest Porsche. The third works Porsche was a further lap behind after having to stop to fix a misfire. Soon after 8pm the Ford pitted for refuelling, handing the lead over to the Porsches with the Rondeau in hot pursuit, and so it stayed going into the night.

=== Night ===
The severe vibrations inherent in the long-stroke Cosworth DFL engine started causing a myriad of problems: Schlesser's clutch needed repair only for the Sauber to then refuse to restart. They would be joined by their teammate before midnight after breaking their third starter motor. The Ultramar Lola dropped back with its starter motor shaken up, and finally retired after 9pm with head gasket failure. The two Fords also broke: Winkelhock lost his clutch, then the engine, and within ten minutes Surer also stopped on the track with his electrics in pieces. Aside from the third-placed Rondeau of Migault/Spice/Lapeyre, the two other team cars had a miserable time with a number of stops to fix fuel and electrical problems and leaving them well back in the field. The best WM had been holding down sixth after its initial surge had to pit at 10.30pm to replace its alternator. The stop cost 20 minutes, dropping them to twelfth and they never recovered – with its gearbox breaking soon after 1am.

Soon after midnight, having led for four hours, the Holbert/Haywood/Barth Porsche suddenly came into the pits, after a loosely closed door had blown off. The repair took twenty minutes, dropping them to fifth. Then in the early morning a rear wheel-bearing broke and they finally got back in the race 20 laps down. By half distance at least 20 cars had retired and a number more were 'walking wounded'. All three works Rondeaux were out. Lapeyre had parked the third-placed car at Arnage with a distributor shaken apart by the DFL. The WMs were also gone, Pignard/Raulet/Theys had a broken gearbox after a faulty alternator, while Dorchy/Fréquelin/Couderc had another crash which resulted in a fire wrecking the car. At the halfway mark, Ickx/Bell (180) were a lap ahead of the Mass/Schuppan car with the Joest car three laps further back (176). The privateer Nimrod was running steadily in fourth (171) and the recovering works Porsche (169) just ahead of the Fitzpatrick 935 leading the GTX class. They were pursued by the NART Ferrari (168), the British 935 leading Group 5 (167) and the Cooke Racing 935K3 in ninth (164). The GTs were led by the Mazdas, with Walkinshaw in 12th (jumping five places in the 12th hour), and Terada in 16th, with Richard Cleare's 934 in 17th. Of the 55 starters only 31 were left running.

=== Morning ===
As dawn broke the two Porsches were well established at the front, cruising up to 30 seconds off their pace in practice. Wollek stayed in contact in third, while the Ferrari had moved up to fourth. The Nimrod had lost time when the cold dawn air had cracked a front brake under heavy deceleration for the Mulsanne corner. Fitzpatrick's 935 had just taken over fourth at 6.15am, when it spluttered into the pits with a blown head gasket. Instead of repairing the engine, the crew disconnected the offending cylinder and sent them back out on five, running at least 15 seconds a lap off pace.

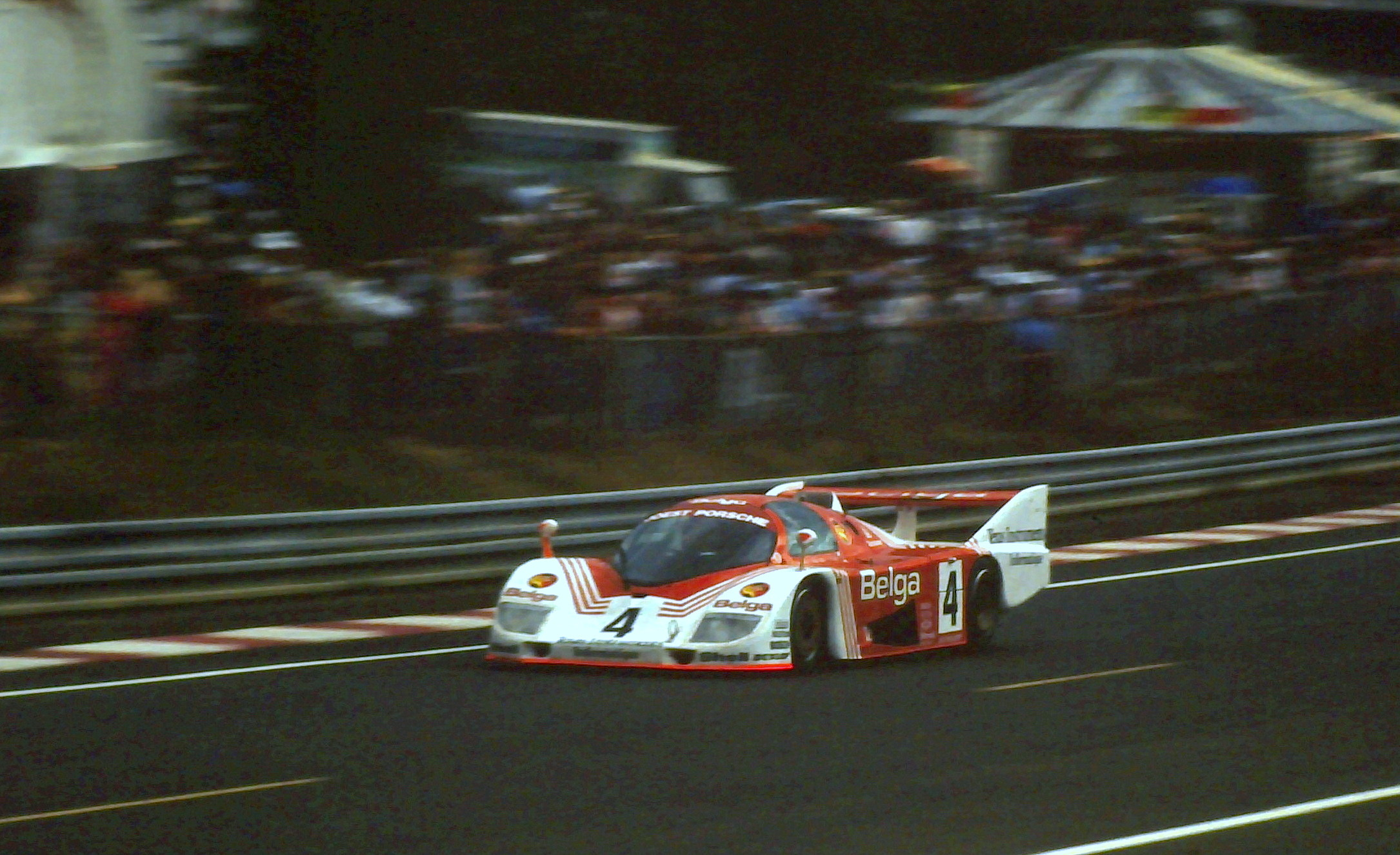
The Joest-Porsche of Wollek/Martin/Martin

Meanwhile, the other leading GTs were having problems. Steve O'Rourke's GTX BMW, (that had been running very well in 12th all through the night) was having more and more severe clutch issues; the 934 lost time when two driveshafts broke within two laps of each other; the leading Mazda's run ended when Peter Lovett stopped on the back straight with a blown engine. Then bigger drama at 10.40am when the leading Porsche suffered a puncture, and had to crawl 6 kilometres slowly back to the pits to save the suspension. A five-lap lead shrunk to three before they were back up to speed. The third Porsche had come back up the field, getting back up to fourth, still nine laps behind the ailing 935. A number of cars were starting to show signs of wear: the Nimrod was smoking, dropping to eighth; either side of midday, the Charles Ivey 935 that had been running 6th lost 18 laps in three pits-tops to repair the turbo. Thierry Perrier's BMW had got as high as 14th in the early morning but was disqualified for doing a full gearbox replacement, a fundamental component, not allowed to be changed in-race.

=== Finish and post-race ===
At midday, with four hours to go, Ickx/Bell (299) still had a 3-lap lead over Schuppan/Mass. Wollek and the Martin brothers were on their own in third (288) but with a worsening misfire. The third works Porsche was pushing, but well back (280). Unfortunately for the Joest team, the engine would not last, and the car stopped at Tertre Rouge with just 90 minutes to go. Another late retirement was the EMKA BMW. Having finally done the clutch replacement, that cost an hour, the car stopped at Mulsanne corner after an oil leak drained the motor with less than two hours to go.

This left the works Porsches running 1-2-3, coincidentally in that numerical order, and that is how they finished without further incident. The Porsche marque took the top-five places for its best-ever finish, with the Fitzpatrick 935 making it home, in fourth, on five cylinders, thirty laps behind the winner, but still four laps ahead of the Cooke Racing 935 (also on five cylinders). Sixth was the Ferrari of the Prancing Horse Farm team, which had kept out of trouble and picked up three places in the last two hours. Despite scaring the Nimrod team when it stopped at the Porsche Curves at 1.30pm, Ray Mallock got enough fuel pressure in the engine to get moving again, and made it back to the pits to be repaired. Running on seven cylinders, the Aston Martin got home in seventh. The Ivey 935 was next, winning the Group 5 class by over 20 laps from the privateer Lancia. The NART Ferrari that had been running fourth, had lost its gearbox around 2pm. Cudini had stopped at the Ford Chicane but managed to get back to the pit where they waited for the final laps, eventually coasting out to finish ninth.

There were only two of the sixteen Cosworth-engines running at the finish: the two privateer Rondeaux, with Pierre Yver's DFV coming home tenth and Christian Bussi's DFL finished fifteenth, having lost two hours during the night replacing its clutch. The Busby/Bundy 924 Carrera won the GTO class, having run on just a single set of BF Goodrich road tyres throughout the race, making it the first Le Mans class-win for a car on road-tyres since the advent of specialised racing tyres. Both Camaros finished, although the McGriff/Brooks car was not classified after losing four hours in the pits for a gearbox rebuild and completing just the one lap in the final hour (finishing with a race-average speed of barely 50 mph).

After earlier concerns about their fuel consumption, it was interesting that the winning Porsche also claimed the Energy Efficiency prize. They achieved 47.8 litres per 100 km, against a target of 35.1. Derek Bell estimated they only had about 20 minutes worth of fuel left at the end, which could have been problematic if they had been pushed all the way by the other teams. As a postscript, John Fitzpatrick's class win in IMSA-GTX would also prove to be the last European victory for the mighty 935. It was also the car in which Rolf Stommelen was killed the following April at Riverside.

The win gave Ickx an unprecedented sixth victory. Porsche achieved its most successful race yet, winning every class. The win had the works team finishing in first, second and third positions, being the only team to have all their cars finish.

== Official results ==
=== Finishers ===
Results taken from Quentin Spurring's book, officially licensed by the ACO
Class Winners are in Bold text.

Pos	Class	No.	Team	Drivers	Chassis	Engine	Tyre	Laps
1	**Gr.C**	**1**	**(West Germany) Porsche System**	**(Belgium) Jacky Ickx** **(United Kingdom) Derek Bell**	Porsche 956	Porsche 935/76 2.6L F6 twin turbo	D	359
2	Gr.C	2	(West Germany) Porsche System	(West Germany) Jochen Mass (Australia) Vern Schuppan	Porsche 956	Porsche 935/76 2.6L F6 twin turbo	D	356
3	Gr.C	3	(West Germany) Porsche System	(West Germany) Jürgen Barth (United States) Hurley Haywood (United States) Al Holbert	Porsche 956	Porsche 935/76 2.6L F6 twin turbo	D	340
4	**IMSA**; **GTX**	**79**	**(United Kingdom) John Fitzpatrick Racing**	**(United Kingdom) John Fitzpatrick** **(United Kingdom) David Hobbs**	Porsche 935/78J	Porsche 930/79 2.7L F6 turbo	G	329
5	IMSA; GTX	78	(United States) Cooke Racing-BP	(France) Dany Snobeck (France) François Sérvanin (France) René Metge	Porsche 935-K3	Porsche 930 2.8L F6 turbo	G	325
6	IMSA; GTX	70	(United States) Prancing Horse Farm Racing	(Belgium) Pierre Dieudonné (United States) Carson Baird (Belgium) Jean-Paul Libert	Ferrari 512 BB/LM	Ferrari 4.9L F12	M	322
7	Gr.C	32	(United Kingdom) Viscount Downe Racing (private entrant)	(United Kingdom) Ray Mallock (United Kingdom) Simon Phillips (United Kingdom) Mike Salmon	Nimrod NRA/C2	Aston Martin DP1229 5.3L V8	A	317
8	**Gr.5**; **SP**	**60**	**(United Kingdom) Charles Ivey Racing** (private entrant)	**(United Kingdom) John Cooper** **(United Kingdom) Paul Smith** **(Belgium) Claude Bourgoignie**	Porsche 935-K3/79	Porsche 930 3.1L F6 turbo	D	316
9	IMSA; GTX	72	(United States) North American Racing Team	(France) Alain Cudini (United States) John Morton (United States) John Paul Jr.	Ferrari 512BB/LM	Ferrari 5.0L F12	D	306
10	Gr.C	25	(France) Compagnie Primagaz (private entrant)	(France) Pierre Yver (France) Bruno Sotty (France) Lucien Guitteny	Rondeau M379C	Cosworth DFV 3.0 L V8	A	306
11	IMSA; GTX	77	(United States) Garretson Developments	(United States) Bob Garretson (France) Anne-Charlotte Verney (United States) Ray Ratcliff	Porsche 935-K3/80	Porsche 930 2.8L F6 twin-turbo	G	299
12	Gr.5; SP	66	(France) J.-M. Lemerle (private entrant) (Italy) Scuderia Sivama di Galliate	(France) Jean-Marie Lemerle (Morocco) Max Cohen-Olivar (United States) Joe Castellano	Lancia Montecarlo Turbo	Lancia 1425cc S4 turbo	G	295
13	**Gr.4**; **GT**	**90**	**(United Kingdom) Richard Cleare Racing** (private entrant)	**(United Kingdom) Richard Cleare** **(United Kingdom) Tony Dron** **(United Kingdom) Richard Jones**	Porsche 934	Porsche 3.0L F6 turbo	D	291
14	IMSA; GTX	82	(Japan) Mazdaspeed (United Kingdom) Tom Walkinshaw Racing	(Japan) Yojiro Terada (Japan) Takashi Yorino (Canada) Allan Moffat	Mazda RX-7 254i	Mazda 13B 1308cc twin-rotary	D	282
15	Gr.C	38	(France) C. Bussi (private entrant)	(France) Christian Bussi (Belgium) Pascal Witmeur (Belgium) Bernard de Dryver	Rondeau M382	Cosworth DFL 3.3L V8	D	279
16	**IMSA**; **GTO**	**87**	**(United States) BF Goodrich**	**(United States) Jim Busby** **(United States) Harry "Doc" Bundy**	Porsche 924 Carrera GTR	Porsche 2.0L S4 turbo	BF	272
17	IMSA; GTO	81	(United States) Stratagraph Inc.	(United States) Billy Hagan (United States) Gene Felton (United States) Tom Williams	Chevrolet Camaro	Chevrolet 5.4L V8	G	269
18	Gr.5; SP	61	(France) A. Gadal (private entrant); Total S.A.	(France) Roland Ennequin (France) Michel Gabriel (Italy) Franco Gasparetti	BMW M1	BMW M88 3.5L S6	D	259
N/C*	IMSA; GTO	80	(United States) Stratagraph Inc.	(United States) Dick Brooks (United States) Hershel McGriff	Chevrolet Camaro	Chevrolet 5.7L V8	G	141

- Note *: Not Classified because did not cover sufficient distance (70% of the winner) by the race's end.

=== Did Not Finish ===
Pos	Class	No	Team	Drivers	Chassis	Engine	Tyre	Laps	Reason
DNF	Gr.C	4	(West Germany) Belga Team Joest Racing	(France) Bob Wollek (Belgium) Jean-Michel Martin (Belgium) Philippe Martin	Porsche 936CJ	Porsche 935 2.5L F6 twin-turbo	D	320	Engine (24hr)
DNF	IMSA; GTX	62	(United Kingdom) EMKA Productions	(United Kingdom) Steve O'Rourke (United Kingdom) Richard Down (United Kingdom) Nick Mason	BMW M1	BMW M88 3.5L S6	D	266	Engine (23hr)
DSQ	Gr.5; SP	65	(France) T. Perrier (private entrant) (Italy) Scuderia Sivama di Galliate	(France) Thierry Perrier (France) Bernard Salam (Italy) Gianni Giudici	Lancia Montecarlo Turbo	Lancia 1425cc S4 turbo	D	219	Illegal repairs (20hr)
DNF	IMSA; GTX	83	(Japan) Mazdaspeed (United Kingdom) Tom Walkinshaw Racing	(United Kingdom) Tom Walkinshaw (United Kingdom) Chuck Nicholson (United Kingdom) Peter Lovett	Mazda RX-7 254i	Mazda 13B 1308cc twin-rotary	D	180	Engine (16hr)
DNF	Gr.6; S 2.0	50	(Italy) Martini Racing	(Italy) Riccardo Patrese (West Germany) Hans Heyer (Italy) Piercarlo Ghinzani	Lancia LC1	Lancia 1425cc S4 turbo	P	152	Electrics (18hr)
DNF	Gr.C	11	(France) Automobiles Jean Rondeau	(France) François Migault (United Kingdom) Gordon Spice (France) Xavier Lapeyre	Rondeau M382	Cosworth DFL 4.0L V8	D	150	Electrics (13hr)
DNF	Gr.C	26	(France) J. Haran (private entrant)	(France) Jacky Haran (France) Hervé Poulain (Republic of Ireland) Vivian Candy	Rondeau M379C	Cosworth DFV 3.0 L V8	A	149	Engine (12hr)
DNF	Gr.C	12	(France) Automobiles Jean Rondeau	(France) Jean Rondeau (France) Jean Ragnotti (France) Henri Pescarolo	Rondeau M382	Cosworth DFL 4.0L V8	D	146	Engine (13hr)
DNF	Gr.5; SP	75	(Switzerland) C. Haldi (private entrant)	(Switzerland) Claude Haldi (Panama) Rodrigo Terran (France) François Hesnault	Porsche 934/5	Porsche 930 3.0L F6 turbo	D	141	Gearbox (13hr)
DNF	IMSA; GTO	86	(United States) BF Goodrich	(Liechtenstein) Manfred Schurti (United States) Patrick Bedard (United States) Paul Miller	Porsche 924 Carrera GTR	Porsche 2.0L S4 turbo	BF	128	Gearbox (15hr)
DNF	Gr.C	9	(France) WM Esso	(Belgium) Didier Theys (France) Michel Pignard (France) Jean-Daniel Raulet	WM P82	Peugeot PRV ZNS4 2.9L; V6 twin-turbo	M	127	Gearbox (11hr)
DNF	Gr.C	10	(France) WM Esso	(France) Roger Dorchy (France) Guy Fréquelin (France) Alain Couderc	WM P82	Peugeot PRV ZNS4 2.9L; V6 twin-turbo	M	112	Accident (12hr)
DNF	Gr.C	24	(France) Automobiles Jean Rondeau	(France) Henri Pescarolo (France) Jean-Pierre Jaussaud	Rondeau M382	Cosworth DFL 4.0L V8	D	111	Engine (10hr)
DNF	IMSA; GTO	85	(United States) Tony Garcia Racing (private entrant)	(United States) Tony Garcia (United States) Fred Stiff (United States) Albert Naon	BMW M1	BMW M88 3.5L S6	G	104	Accident (11hr)
DNF	Gr.6; S 2.0	51	(Italy) Martini Racing	(Italy) Michele Alboreto (Italy) Teo Fabi (West Germany) Rolf Stommelen	Lancia LC1	Lancia 1425cc S4 turbo	P	92	Engine (10hr)
DNF	Gr.C	36	(Japan) Dome Co. Ltd	(United Kingdom) Chris Craft (Chile) Eliseo Salazar	Dome RC82	Cosworth DFL 3.3L V8	D	85	Chassis broken (10hr)
DNF	Gr.C	14	(United Kingdom) March Racing	(Sweden) Eje Elgh (United States) Jeff Wood (Belgium) Patrick Nève	March 82G	Chevrolet 5.8L V8	G	78	Electrics (10hr)
DNF	Gr.C	35	(France) Courage Compétition	(France) Yves Courage (France) Jean-Philippe Grand (France) Michel Dubois	Cougar C01	Cosworth DFL 3.3L V8	D	78	Transmission (14hr)
DNF	IMSA; GTO	84 reserve	(United Kingdom) Canon Cameras; GTi Engineering	(United Kingdom) Richard Lloyd (United Kingdom) Andy Rouse	Porsche 924 Carrera GTR	Porsche 2.0L S4 turbo	D	77	Transmission (11hr)
DNF	Gr.C	20	(West Germany) BASF Cassetten Team; GS Sport	(West Germany) Hans-Joachim Stuck (France) Jean-Louis Schlesser (Austria) Dieter Quester	Sauber SHS C6	Cosworth DFL 4.0L V8	D	76	Engine mounts (7hr)
DNF	Gr.C	16	(United Kingdom) Ultramar Team Lola	(United Kingdom) Guy Edwards (United Kingdom) Rupert Keegan (United Kingdom) Nick Faure	Lola T610	Cosworth DFL 4.0L V8	A	72	Engine (7hr)
DNF	Gr.C	7	(West Germany) Ford-Werke AG (West Germany) Zakspeed	(West Germany) Manfred Winkelhock (West Germany) Klaus Niedzwiedz	Ford C100	Cosworth DFL 4.0L V8	G	71	Electrics (7hr)
DNF	Gr.C	6	(West Germany) Ford-Werke AG (West Germany) Zakspeed	(West Germany) Klaus Ludwig (Switzerland) Marc Surer	Ford C100	Cosworth DFL 4.0L V8	G	67	Electrics ( 7hr)
DNF	Gr.6; S 2.0	55	(United Kingdom) Chevron Racing Cars	(Republic of Ireland) Martin Birrane (United Kingdom) John Sheldon (Australia) Neil Crang	Chevron B36	Cosworth BDX 1975cc S4	A	57	Gearbox (7hr)
DNF	IMSA; GTX	71	Charles Pozzi Ferrari France	(France) Claude Ballot-Léna (France) Jean-Claude Andruet (Belgium) Hervé Regout	Ferrari 512BB/LM	Ferrari 4.9L F12	M	57	Engine (6hr)
DNF	Gr.C	39	(United Kingdom) Dorset Racing Associates	(United Kingdom) Ian Harrower (United Kingdom) Mike Wilds (United Kingdom) François Duret	De Cadenet-Lola LMC	Cosworth DFV 3.0 L V8	M	56	Out of fuel (7hr)
DNF	Gr.C	19	(West Germany) BASF Cassetten Team; GS Sport	(Switzerland) Walter Brun (West Germany) Siegfried Müller Jr.	Sauber SHS C6	Cosworth DFL 4.0L V8	D	55	Electrics (8hr)
DNF	Gr.C	31	(United Kingdom) Nimrod Racing Automobiles	(United Kingdom) Tiff Needell (United Kingdom) Bob Evans (United Kingdom) Geoff Lees	Nimrod NRA/C2	Aston Martin DP1229 5.3L V8	A	55	Accident (5hr)
DNF	Gr.C	30	(France) M. Lateste (private entrant)	(France) Michel Lateste (France) Hubert Striebig (France) Jacques Heuclin	URD C81	BMW M88 3.5L S6	G	45	Engine (5hr)
DNF	IMSA; GTX	73	(United States) T-Bird Swap Shop (United States) North American Racing Team	(United States) Preston Henn (United States) Randy Lanier (France) Denis Morin	Ferrari 512BB/LM	Ferrari 5.0L F12	M	43	Out of fuel (6hr)
DNF	Gr.5; SP	64	(West Germany) E. Dören (private entrant)	(West Germany) Edgar Dören (Mexico) Antonio Contreras (Mexico) Billy Sprowls	Porsche 935-K3/79	Porsche 930 2.8L F6 turbo	D	39	Out of fuel (6hr)
DNF	Gr.C	17	(United States) Cooke Racing Malardeau	(United Kingdom) Brian Redman (United States) Ralph Kent-Cooke (United States) Jim Adams	Lola T610	Cosworth DFL 4.0L V8	G	28	Out of fuel (4hr)
DNF	Gr.C	29	(United States) Garretson Developments	(United States) Bobby Rahal (United States) Skeeter McKitterick (United States) Jim Trueman	March 82G	Chevrolet 5.8L V8	G	28	Fuel cell (7hr)
DNF	Gr.C	5	(West Germany) Kremer Racing (United States) Interscope Racing	(United States) Ted Field (United States) Danny Ongais (United States) Bill Whittington	Porsche C-K5	Porsche 930 2.3L F6 turbo	G	25	Engine (4hr)
DNF	IMSA; GTX	76	(United States) Bob Akin Motor Racing	(United States) Bob Akin (United States) David Cowart (United States) Kenper Miller	Porsche 935-L1	Porsche 930 2.8L F6 turbo	G	15	Out of fuel (4hr)
DNF	Gr.C	37	(United Kingdom) GRID Racing	(Spain) Emilio de Villota (South Africa) Desiré Wilson (United Kingdom) Alain de Cadenet	Grid-Plaza S1	Cosworth DFL 3.3L V8	D	7	Engine (2hr)

=== Did Not Start ===
Pos	Class	No	Team	Drivers	Chassis	Engine	Tyre	Reason
DNS DSQ	Gr.C	27	(United States) Grand Touring Cars Inc.	(United States) Mario Andretti (United States) Michael Andretti	Mirage M12	Cosworth DFL 4.0L V8	G	Failed Scrutineering
DNQ	Gr.5; SP	63	(West Germany) Vegla Racing Team	(West Germany) Dieter Schornstein (West Germany) Harald Grohs (Colombia) Mauricio de Narváez	Porsche 935J	Porsche 930 2.8L F6 twin-turbo	M	Practice accident
DNQ	Gr.B	95	(France) A. Gadal (private entrant); Total S.A.	(France) Alain Gadal (France) Jean-Yves Gadal (France) Raymond Touroul	Porsche 911 Turbo (930)	Porsche 930/60 3.3L F6 turbo	M	Did not qualify
DNA	Gr.C	8	(West Germany) Ford-Werke AG (West Germany) Zakspeed		Ford C100	Cosworth DFL 4.0L V8	G	Did not arrive
DNA	Gr.C	15	(United Kingdom) March Racing		March 82G	Chevrolet 5.7L V8	G	Entry not accepted
DNA	Gr.C	23	(France) Automobiles Jean Rondeau	(France) François Migault (United States) Danny Sullivan	Rondeau M482	Cosworth DFL 4.0L V8	D	Did not arrive
DNA	Gr.C	28	(United States) Grand Touring Cars Inc.	(United States) Rick Mears (United States) John Morton	Mirage M12	Cosworth DFL 4.0L V8	G	Did not arrive
DNA	Gr.6; S 2.0	52	(Italy) Martini Racing	(Italy) Riccardo Patrese (West Germany) Rolf Stommelen	Lancia LC1	Lancia 1425cc S4 turbo	P	Did not arrive
DNA	Gr.6; S 2.0	54	(France) Écurie Renard-Delmas	(France) Hervé Bayard (France) Michel Dubois	Renard-Delmas D1 82	BMW M12 1998cc S4		Failed scrutineering
DNA	Gr.6; S 2.0	56	(France) J.-M. Lemerle (private entrant)	(France) Jean-Marie Lemerle (Morocco) Max Cohen-Olivar	Osella PA8	BMW M12 1998cc S4		Did not arrive
DNA	IMSA; GTX	74	(France) T. Perrier (private entrant)	(France) Thierry Perrier (France) Bernard Salam (France) Roger Carmillet	Ferrari 512BB/LM	Ferrari 4.9L F12		Did not arrive

=== Class Winners ===
Class	Winning car	Winning drivers
Group C Sports Prototype	#1 Porsche 956	Ickx / Bell *
Group B Special GT	no starters	
IMSA GTX IMSA GT Experimental	#70 Porsche 935/78J	Fitzpatrick / Hobbs *
IMSA GTO IMSA GT over 2.5-litre	#87 Porsche 924 Carrera GTR	Busby / Bundy
Group 6 S Sports Prototype up to 2-litre	no finishers	
Group 5 SP Special Production	#60 Porsche 935-K3/79	Cooper / Bourgoignie / Smith
Group 4 GTS Special GT	#90 Porsche 934	Cleare / Dron / Jones

- Note: setting a new class distance record.

=== Index of Energy Efficiency ===
Pos	Class	No	Team	Drivers	Chassis	Score
1	Gr.C	1	(West Germany) Porsche System	(Belgium) Jacky Ickx (United Kingdom) Derek Bell	Porsche 956	0.735
2	Gr.C	2	(West Germany) Porsche System	(West Germany) Jochen Mass (Australia) Vern Schuppan	Porsche 956	0.688
3	IMSA; GTX	72	(United States) North American Racing Team	(France) Alain Cudini (United States) John Morton (United States) John Paul Jr.	Ferrari 512BB/LM	0.663
4	Gr.C	3	(West Germany) Porsche System	(West Germany) Jürgen Barth (United States) Hurley Haywood (United States) Al Holbert	Porsche 956	0.582
5	IMSA; GTX	79	(United Kingdom) John Fitzpatrick Racing	(United Kingdom) John Fitzpatrick (United Kingdom) David Hobbs	Porsche 935/78J	0.555
6	IMSA; GTX	70	(United States) Prancing Horse Farm Racing	(Belgium) Pierre Dieudonné (United States) Carson Baird (Belgium) Jean-Paul Libert	Ferrari 512 BB/LM	0.549
7	Gr.C	25	(France) Compagnie Primagaz (private entrant)	(France) Pierre Yver (France) Bruno Sotty (France) Lucien Guitteny	Rondeau M379C	0.493
8	Gr.C	32	(United Kingdom) Viscount Downe Racing (private entrant)	(United Kingdom) Ray Mallock (United Kingdom) Simon Phillips (United Kingdom) Mike Salmon	Nimrod NRA/C2	0.488
9	IMSA; GTX	78	(United States) Cooke Racing-BP	(France) Dany Snobeck (France) François Sérvanin (France) René Metge	Porsche 935-K3	0.464
10	IMSA; GTX	82	(Japan) Mazdaspeed (United Kingdom) Tom Walkinshaw Racing	(Japan) Yojiro Terada (Japan) Takashi Yorino (Canada) Allan Moffat	Mazda RX-7 254i	0.419

- Note: Only the top ten positions are included in this set of standings.

=== Statistics ===
Taken from Quentin Spurring's book, officially licensed by the ACO

- Pole Position –J. Ickx, #1 Porsche 936/81– 3:28.4secs; 235.38 km/h (146.26 mph)
- Fastest Lap –J. Ragnotti, #12 Rondeau M379C – 3:36.9secs; 226.16 km/h (140.53 mph)
- Winning Distance – 4,899.09 km (3,044.15 mi)
- Winner's Average Speed – 204.13 km/h (126.84 mph)
- Attendance – almost 250 000

Citations
