= Nimrod NRA/C2 =

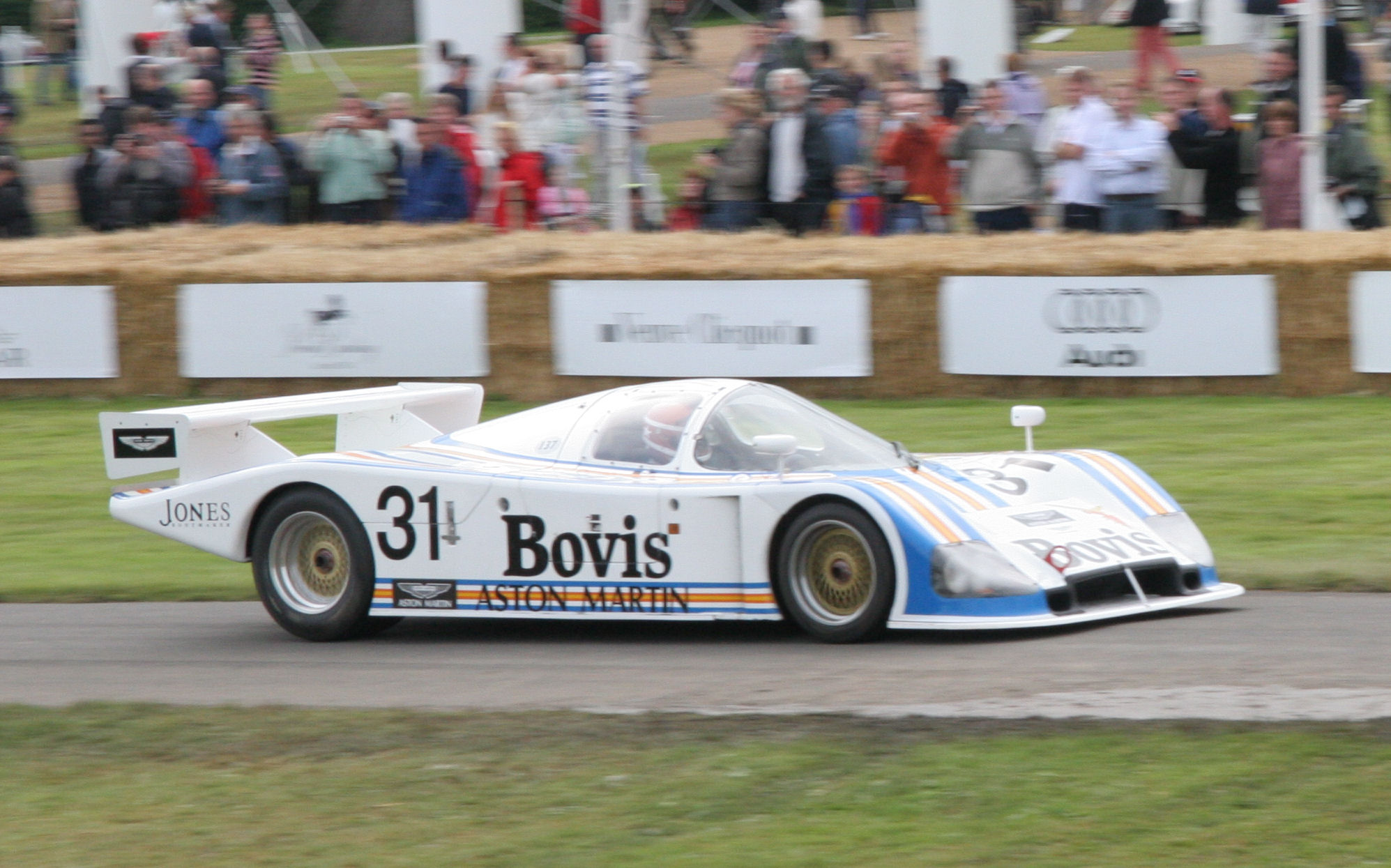
- Viscount Downe Racing's Nimrod NRA/C2 005 at Goodwood Festival of Speed 2007
- Category: Group C sports prototype
- Constructor: Nimrod Racing Automobiles; Aston Martin
- Designers: Eric Broadley, Andy Thorby

Technical specifications
- Chassis: Aluminium and Dural monocoque with a Fibre glass body
- Suspension (front): Independent, Unequal wishboned and adjustable Koni dampers
- Suspension (rear): Independent, Unequal wishboned, adjustable Koni dampers and anti-roll bar
- Length: 15 ft 8 in (4,780 mm)
- Width: 6 ft 3 in (1,900 mm)
- Height: 3 ft 3 in (990 mm)
- Wheelbase: 9 ft 0 in (2,740 mm)
- Engine: Aston Martin Tickford DP1229 5,340cc alloy V8, DOHC per bank, 570 bhp @ 7000 rpm, 213 mph (343 km/h), RR layout
- Transmission: Hewland DG300 5-speed Manual
- Weight: 2,204 lb (1,000 kg)
- Tyres: 18" Avon

Competition history
- Notable entrants: (United Kingdom) Nimrod Racing Automobiles
- Notable drivers: (United Kingdom) Ray Mallock (United Kingdom) Tiff Needell (United States) A. J. Foyt (United States) Darrell Waltrip (United Kingdom) Geoff Lees

The Nimrod NRA/C2 was the only Group C racing car ever built by Nimrod Racing Automobiles in partnership with Aston Martin. It ran initially in 1982 in the World Endurance Championship before also joining the IMSA GT Championship. The final NRA/C2 would be retired in 1984 after the planned NRA/C3 replacement had been cancelled, and the company went bankrupt.

== Development ==
Beginning in 1981, Robin Hamilton hastily constructed a chassis for use as a test vehicle in preparation for competition in the 1982 season. This lone car, known as NRA/C1, was used to test design and mechanical features for the upcoming race car, the NRA/C2.

For an engine, Aston Martin turned to their tuning arm Tickford for the development of a racing version of their production V8 engines seen in the V8 and V8 Vantage models. This engine, becoming known as "Development Prototype 1229" (DP1229), retained the same basic displacement of 5340 cc while being strengthened in order to handle the increased output.

Eric Broadley of Lola Cars International designed the chassis of this new car, since he had experience already with the Aston Martin V8 engine fitted into the 1967 Lola T70. Since Lola constructed the basic tub, this earned it the designation "T385", although "NRA/C2" was the car's official name. The chassis was a simple, low design that featured a large air opening in the nose similar to an Aston Martin grill shape. Large side vents built into the doors would also be used.

Ray Mallock would later evolve the NRA/C2's design into a B-spec model for the 1983 season. These modifications included squared off front fenders, a thinner tail, and the removal of the vents in the doors. Small vertical exhaust vents would be added behind the front wheel well.

== Racing history ==
=== 1982 ===
Debuting at the 1000 km of Silverstone, the two chassis were entered by Nimrod themselves, although only one actually raced. A third chassis that was also completed at the time had been sold to the owner of the Aston Martin Owners Club, John Dawnay, who ran the Viscount Downe Racing team as a privateer entry. Viscount Downe would be the more successful of the two, as they finished in sixth place at Silverstone, fourth in the Group C class. This was followed by the team taking seventh place at the 24 Hours of Le Mans, again fourth in class. The factory team would take an eleventh at Spa while Viscount Downe would take ninth at Brands Hatch. These successes for both Nimrod and Viscount Downe earned Nimrod and Aston Martin third place in the World Endurance Championship for Manufacturers.

=== 1983 ===
For 1983 Nimrod Racing would turn to the IMSA GT Championship in North America with two cars evolved into the B-spec bodywork, while EMKA Racing would take over Aston Martin's efforts in Europe with their own Group C car. Viscount Downe would remain in the World Endurance Championship with their lone entry as a privateer. Nimrod suffered throughout the season in North America, earning their only success as the 12 Hours of Sebring with a fifth-place finish, third in the GTP class. For the rest of the season the NRA/C2 would struggle to finish and Nimrod was forced to abandon the series towards the end of the year. One NRA/C2 was sold to Jack Miller's privateer team while Nimrod returned to Europe. Miller's Performance Motorsports finished off the season with an eighth-place finish at the Daytona Finale. Even with the troubles, Aston Martin took fifth in the GTP constructors' championship.

Upon returning to Europe, Nimrod Racing Automobiles was forced to close its doors due to financial troubles, ending the short life of the project.

Privateer Viscount Downe had a similarly bad season in the World Endurance Championship, with a seventh-place result early in the season at Silverstone being their only race finish. Even with just one finish, Aston Martin-Nimrod once again took third in the Makes title.

=== 1984 ===
Viscount Downe would attempt to continue in the World Endurance Championship for 1984, even adding the last NRA/C2 chassis built before Nimrod folded. First appearing at the IMSA GT 24 Hours of Daytona, the team would manage seventh- and sixteenth-place finishes. However, upon returning to Europe, neither car would finish at Silverstone. For the 24 Hours of Le Mans, both Nimrods were eliminated in a single incident on the Mulsanne Straight, with John Sheldon hitting the barriers in the first car and Mark Olson in the second car colliding with the wreckage. A track marshal was killed in the incident. Both cars were burned beyond repair, forcing Viscount Downe to pull out of the championship and end the program.

Jack Miller's Performance Motorsports would also attempt to continue in IMSA GT before it too would be abandoned without a finish to its credit.

== Chassis ==
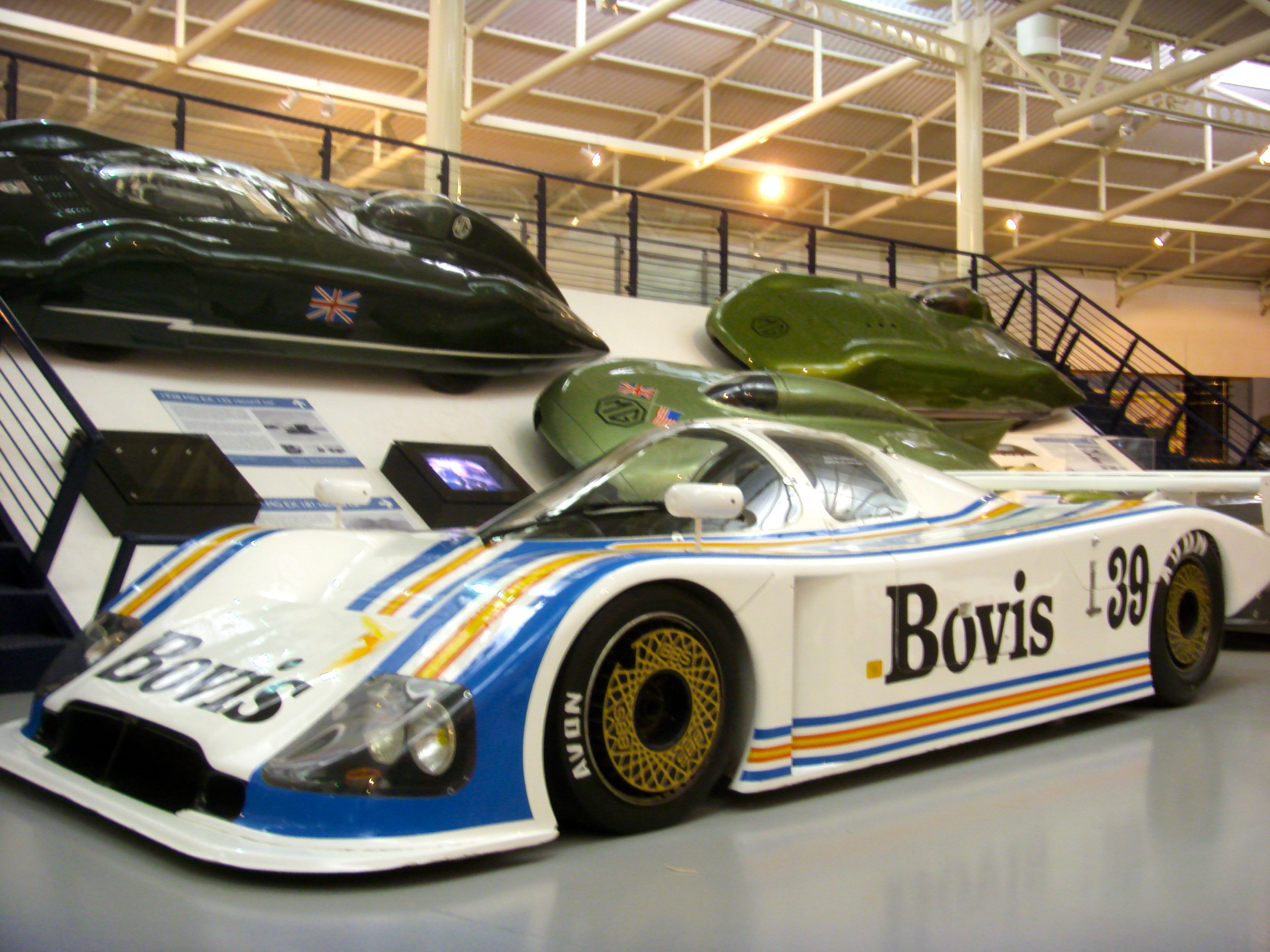
NRA/C2 004 at the Heritage Motor Centre, Gaydon, Warwickshire

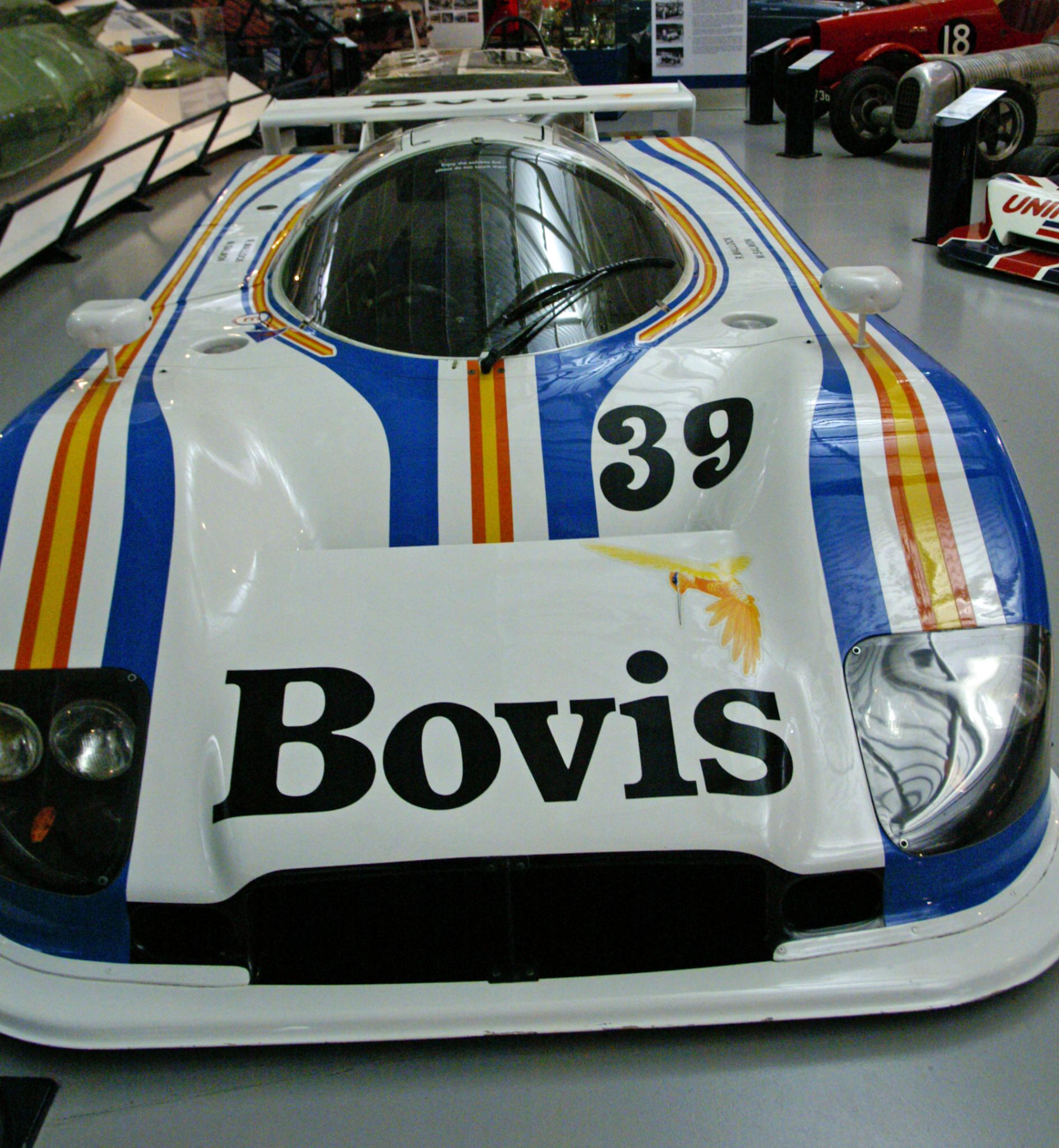
NRA/C2 004 in Bovis livery

In total five Nimrod chassis were built between 1981 and 1984.

Included are a list of finishes by each chassis.

- NRA/C1 001 - Completed 1981
  - Development car
- NRA/C2 002 - Completed 1982
  - 1983 Daytona 3 Hours- 8th
  - 1985 Lime Rock 2 Hours- 16th
  - 1985 Mid-Ohio 3 Hours- 15th
  - 1985 Columbus 4 Hours- 15th
- NRA/C2 003 - Completed 1982
  - 1983 Miami GP- 20th
  - 1983 Sebring 12 Hours- 5th
- NRA/C2 004 - Completed 1982
  - 1982 B.R.D.C Silverstone- 6th
  - 1982 Le Mans 24 Hour- 7th
  - 1982 B.R.S.C Brands Hatch- 9th
  - 1983 B.R.D.C Silverstone- 7th
  - 1983 R.A.C Brands Hatch- 3rd
  - 1984 Daytona 24 Hours- 16th
- NRA/C2 005 - Completed 1984
  - 1984 Daytona 24 Hours- 7th
- NRA/C3 006 - Not completed

== NRA/C3 ==
A new chassis had also been under development in 1983, known as NRA/C3. Only a chassis tub and basic windtunnel testing had been completed before Nimrod Racing Automobiles was forced to close. This chassis, NRA/C3 006 is still in existence but has never been fully built.

== See also ==
•Aston Martin RHAM/1

•Aston Martin AMR1

•EMKA Aston Martin
