= TOM's Toyota LMP =

TOM'S Toyota LMP
- Category: Le Mans Prototype
- Constructor: Toyota
- Designer: Andy Thorby (project director)
- Successor: Toyota GT-One

Technical specifications
- Engine: Toyota 3S-GT 2,140 cc (130.6 cu in) 16 valve, DOHC I4, turbocharged, mid-engined
- Transmission: Xtrac
- Weight: 790 kg (1,741.7 lb)

Competition history
Races	Wins	Poles	F/Laps
0	0	0	0

The TOM's Toyota LMP (nicknamed the "Lumpy") was a Le Mans Prototype built by Toyota. A very low budget effort, the car reused the 2.1-litre turbocharged straight-four engine from Toyota's Group C cars and was intended as an experimental car. It never raced, although it was tested on at least three occasions.

== Design and development ==
In 1996, Toyota Motor Sports funded the development of an experimental Le Mans Prototype, which was officially known as the TOM'S Toyota LMP. As Toyota were primarily focusing on their Championship Auto Racing Teams (CART) engine, which first ran that year, the LMP project was run on a tight budget of approximately $500,000. Due to this tight budget, the car, christened the "Lumpy", reused Toyota's 3S-GT engine in the 88C Group C specification, which was a 2.1-litre turbocharged straight-four engine, producing 560 hp (418 kW; 568 PS); this engine was coupled to an Xtrac gearbox from a Peugeot Group C car. The chassis tub was designed to be simple but strong, and the bodywork was also simple; the tight budget meant that the LMP never saw a wind tunnel. The bodywork was designed to minimize lift over the upper body of the car, and had much simpler brake cooling than on most Le Mans Prototypes; the radiator ducts were used, via a scoop, to cool the brakes. After the LMP was completed, Tom Kristensen tested it on at least one occasion, whilst project director Andy Thorby recalled it being tested a total of three times; he stated that the car was very reliable, had lower fuel consumption than the 88C Group C car had (with the same engine), and that it also appeared to be quick. Following the completion of the tests, the car was dispatched to Toyota Team Europe's Cologne workshop, stored under a tarpaulin and eventually destroyed. Toyota would return to sportscar racing in 1998, with the André de Cortanze-designed Toyota GT-One.
