= Nimrod Racing Automobiles =

Nimrod Racing Automobiles (sometimes referred to as Aston Martin Nimrod) was a partnership founded in 1981 between racing driver and car dealer Robin Hamilton and chairman of Aston Martin Lagonda, Victor Gauntlett. The project was intended to build sports prototypes for the World Endurance Championship and IMSA GT Championship using Aston Martin V8 engines. Although Aston Martin did not own the project, they offered their support for the chance to see success for their name in motorsports without the heavy cost of running their own team.

== NRA/C2 ==
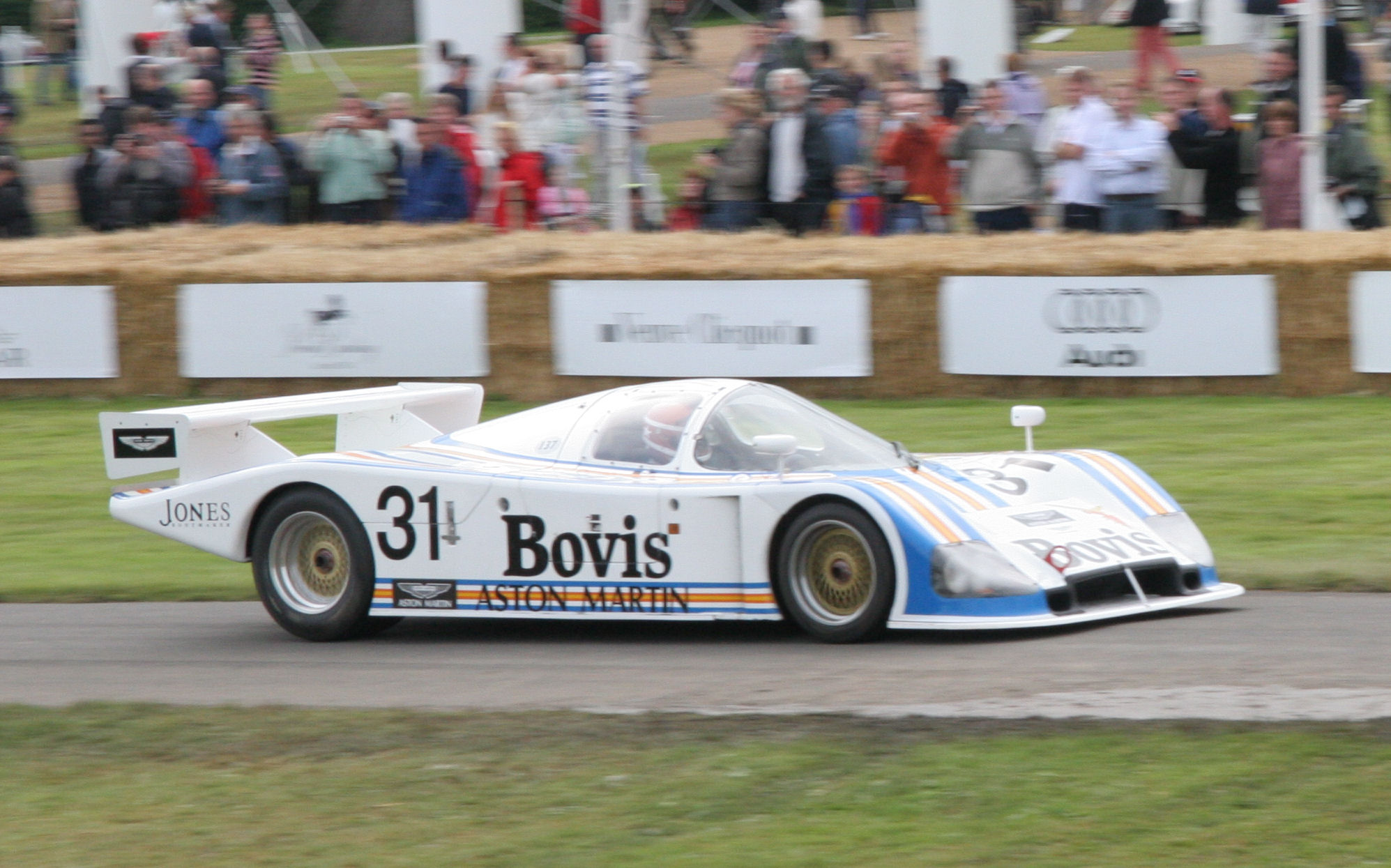
A privateer NRA/C2.

Nimrod built three NRA/C2s for competition in 1982, with two being run by the works team while the third was sold to Dawnay Racing, a team owned by the then AMOC president Viscount Downe. The cars were capable of running both in the World Endurance Championship's Group C specification and IMSA GT's GTP specification.

Combining a production-based V8 engine from the V8 and V8 Vantage models, the engine was refined by Aston Martin Tickford to handle the increased output. Eric Broadley designed the chassis and his company Lola Cars International built the tubs. Ray Mallock would later evolve the NRA/C2's design into a B-spec model for the 1983 season.

== Team history ==
Debuting at the 1000 km of Silverstone, Nimrod entered one of their own cars alongside the Dawnay Racing privateer entry. Nimrod faced mechanical troubles and did not finish, although Viscount Downe had a sixth-place finish. Problems continued for Nimrod Racing at the 24 Hours of Le Mans where their race was ended early with an accident. Nimrod's only success for the season came at the 1000km Spa, where one of their two cars finished, taking eleventh place. The combined results of Nimrod and Viscount Downe earned Aston Martin third in the constructors championship that year.

For 1982, with the evolved NRA/C2, Nimrod Racing would turn to the IMSA GT Championship in North America due to EMKA Racing taking over Aston Martin's factory-backed efforts in Europe with their own car. Nimrod suffered throughout the season, earning their only success as the 12 Hours of Sebring with a fifth-place finish, third in the GTP class. The team would struggle to finish races for the rest of the season before financial trouble eventually forced them to return to Europe.

Following their disappointing return to Europe, Nimrod Racing Automobiles closed due to continued financial troubles, ending the short life of the project. A new chassis had been under development at the time, known as NRA/C3, yet was never completed before the team was dissolved. Privateers continued to use Nimrod's NRA/C2 until the 1984 24 Hours of Le Mans, where two cars ran by Dawnay racing were destroyed in a fiery crash at the Mulsanne straight.

== Bibliography ==
- Anthony Pritchard (30 November 2006). Aston Martin: A Racing History. Haynes Publishing. ISBN 978-1844252411.
